= 2017 Canon Media Awards =

New Zealand media awards

- Awarded for: Excellence in New Zealand print and online media.
- Sponsored by: Canon New Zealand
- Date: 19 May 2017
- Location: The Langham, Auckland
- Country: New Zealand
- Hosted by: Newspaper Publishers' Association
- Website: www.canon.co.nz/explore/canon-media-awards

The 2017 Canon Media Awards were presented on 19 May 2017 at The Langham, Auckland, New Zealand. Awards were made in the categories of digital, feature writing, general, magazines, newspapers, opinion writing, photography, reporting and videography. The Wolfson scholarship, health journalism scholarships, and awards for editorial executive and outstanding achievements, were also presented.

== Winners ==
=== Digital ===
- Best Blog Site: Villainesse
- Best News Website or App: Newshub
- Website of the Year: NZ Herald

=== Feature Writing (long-form, +2500 words) ===
- Best Feature Writer - Junior: Don Rowe, 1972 magazine and New Zealand Geographic
- Feature Writer - arts and entertainment: David Larsen, Metro
- Feature Writer - business and politics: Simon Wilson, Metro
- Feature Writer - crime and justice: James Mahoney, Metro
- Feature Writer - general: Aaron Smale, RNZ
- Feature Writer - health and lifestyle: Kirsty Johnston, NZ Herald
- Feature Writer - sport: Dylan Cleaver, NZ Herald
- Feature Writer of the Year: Joanna Wane, North & South
- Feature Writer of the Year (runner-up): Aaron Smale, Mana magazine, North & South and RNZ

=== Feature Writing (short-form, up to 2500 words) ===
- Best Feature Writer - Junior: Christopher Reive, Taranaki Daily News
- Feature Writer - arts and entertainment: Charlie Gates, The Press
- Feature Writer - business and politics: Mava Enoka, The Wireless
- Feature Writer - crime and justice: Jared Savage, NZ Herald
- Feature Writer - general: Adam Dudding, Sunday Star-Times
- Feature Writer - general (runner-up): Madeleine Chapman, The Spinoff
- Feature Writer - health and lifestyle: Greg Bruce, NZ Herald
- Feature Writer - sport: Jonathan Carson, Sunday Star-Times
- Feature Writer of the Year: Nikki Macdonald, The Dominion Post and Sunday Star-Times

=== General ===
- Best artwork/graphics: Toby Morris, RNZ and The Wireless
- Best artwork/graphics (runner-up): Richard Dale, NZ Herald
- Best headline: Matthew Dallas, Manawatu Standard
- Best headline (runner-up): Ian Allen, Marlborough Express
- Best trade/specialist publication and/or website: Jackie Harrigan, NZ Dairy Exporter magazine
- Cartoonist of the Year: Sharon Murdoch, Sunday Star-Times, The Dominion Post and The Press
- Cartoonist of the Year (runner-up): Toby Morris, RNZ and The Wireless
- Reviewer of the Year: Duncan Greive, NZ Herald and The Spinoff

=== Magazines ===
- Best magazine design: HOME
- Best magazine design (runner-up): Mana magazine
- Best newspaper-inserted magazine: Your Weekend/The Dominion Post, The Press and Waikato Times
- Magazine of the Year: New Zealand Geographic

=== Newspapers ===
- Best newspaper front page: Weekend Herald
- Canon Community Newspaper of the Year: Feilding-Rangitikei Herald
- Canon Newspaper of the Year: Weekend Herald
- Newspaper of the Year (more than 30,000 circulation): NZ Herald
- Newspaper of the Year (up to 30,000 circulation): Nelson Mail
- Weekly Newspaper of the Year: Weekend Herald

=== Opinion Writing ===
- Opinion Writer - business and politics: Simon Wilson, Public Address, RNZ and The Spinoff
- Opinion Writer - general: Lizzie Marvelly, Weekend Herald
- Opinion Writer - humour/satire: Steve Braunias, NZ Herald
- Opinion Writer - sport: Dylan Cleaver, NZ Herald
- Opinion Writer of the Year: Duncan Garner, The Dominion Post

=== Photography ===
- Best feature photo: Richard Robinson, New Zealand Geographic
- Best general photo: Paul Taylor, Hawke's Bay Today
- Best news photo: Blair Pattinson, Otago Daily Times
- Best photo (junior): Christel Yardley, Waikato Times
- Best photo essay: Mike Scott, NZ Herald
- Best portrait photo: Meek Zuiderwyk, Metro
- Best sports photo: Chris Cameron, NZ Herald
- Photographer of the Year: Alan Gibson, NZ Herald

=== Reporting ===
- Best coverage of a major news event: "Kaikoura earthquake", Stuff, Kaikoura Star, The Dominion Post, The Marlborough Express and The Press
- Best editorial campaign or project: "#buythisbeachNZ", Stuff
- Best editorial campaign or project (runner-up): "Panama papers" RNZ, TVNZ and Nicky Hager
- Best investigation: Matt Nippert, NZ Herald
- Best Reporter (Junior): Donna-Lee Biddle, Stuff and Waikato Times
- Best (single) news story: Olivia Carville and Mike Scott, NZ Herald
- Business Journalist of the Year: Gareth Vaughan, Interest
- Business Journalist of the Year (runner-up): Matt Nippert and Caleb Tutty, NZ Herald
- Community Journalist of the Year: Paul Taylor, Mountain Scene
- Regional Journalist of the Year: Aaron Leaman, Stuff and Waikato Times
- Reporter - arts and entertainment: Vicki Anderson, Stuff and The Press
- Reporter - crime and justice: Eugene Bingham, Phil Johnson, Toby Longbottom and Paula Penfold (Stuff Circuit team)
- Reporter - general: Lane Nichols, Weekend Herald
- Reporter - health and lifestyle: Dylan Cleaver, NZ Herald
- Reporter - Maori and ethnic affairs: Renee Kahukura Iosefa, Maori Television
- Reporter of the Year: Matt Nippert, NZ Herald
- Science and Technology Award: Kate Evans, New Zealand Geographic
- Sports Journalist of the Year: Dylan Cleaver, NZ Herald
- Sports Journalist of the Year (runner-up): Liam Napier, Sunday Star-Times
- Student Journalist of the Year: Miri Schroeter, Manawatu Standard

=== Videography ===
- Best feature video: Mike Scott, NZ Herald
- Best news video: Ross Giblin, Stuff
- Best sports video: Brett Phibbs, Mike Scott and Peter Visagie, NZ Herald
- Videographer of the Year: Ross Giblin, Stuff
- Videographer of the Year (runner-up): Mike Scott, NZ Herald

=== nib Health Journalism Scholarships ===
- nib Health Journalism Scholarship - Junior: Rachel Thomas, Stuff
- nib Health Journalism Scholarship - Senior: Dylan Cleaver, NZ Herald AND Aaron Leaman, Stuff and Waikato Times

=== Editorial Executive of the Year ===
- Glen Scanlon, head of digital media, RNZ

=== Wolfson Fellowship ===
- Miriyana Alexander, Editor of the Weekend Herald and Herald on Sunday

=== NPA Outstanding Achievement Awards ===
- Donna Chisholm, feature writer and editor
- Ross Setford, photographer
- Matamata Chronicle, 50 years' publishing
- NZ Cartoon Archive, 25 years' archiving cartoons
