= 2020 Voyager Media Awards =

- Awarded for: Excellence in New Zealand journalism
- Sponsored by: Voyager New Zealand
- Date: 22 May 2020
- Country: New Zealand
- Hosted by: Newspaper Publishers' Association
- Website: www.voyagermediaawards.nz

The 2020 Voyager Media Awards were the 47th annual New Zealand Media Awards, honouring New Zealand journalism from 2019. The awards are run by the News Publishers' Association, with Voyager Internet as premier sponsor since 2018. Because of COVID-19 restrictions, there was no in-person ceremony and the winners were revealed in an online presentation on 22 May 2020.

== Winners ==
All winners are from the NPA's published results.

=== General ===
Award	Winner	Organisation	Runner-up
Best Headline, Caption or Hook	Barnaby Sharp	The Nelson Mail/Stuff	
Best Artwork/Graphics	1News Design Team	TVNZ	Toby Morris (The Spinoff)
Best Interview or Profile	Michelle Langstone	NZ Herald/NZME	
Cartoonist of the Year	Toby Morris	The Spinoff	
Opinion Writer of the Year	Emma Espiner	Newsroom	Simon Wilson (NZ Herald/NZME)
Reviewer of the Year	Paul Little	North & South/Bauer Media	
Travel Journalist of the Year	Mike White	North & South/Bauer Media	
Editorial Executive of the Year	Annabelle Lee-Mather	The Hui/GSTV for MediaWorks	

=== Scholarships ===
Award	Winner	Organisation
nib Health Journalism Scholarship – Junior	Emma Russell	NZ Herald/NZME
nib Health Journalism Scholarship – Senior	Nicholas Jones	NZ Herald/NZME
Regional Journalism Scholarship	Natalie Akoorie	NZ Herald/NZME
Regional Journalism Scholarship	Aaron Leaman	Waikato Times/Stuff
Peter M Acland Foundation Fellowship	Charles Anderson	Vanishing Point Studio
Peter M Acland Foundation Fellowship	Mava Enoka	TVNZ

=== Feature Writing ===
Award	Winner	Organisation	Runner-up
Feature Writing – Crime and Justice	Mike White	North & South/Bauer Media	
Feature Writing – Social Issues, Including Health and Education	Florence Kerr	Stuff	
Feature Writing – General	Steve Braunias	NZ Herald/NZME and Newsroom	
Feature Writing – General	Duncan Greive	The Spinoff	
Best First-Person Essay or Feature (no word limit)	Tayi Tibble	Newsroom	
Best Feature Writer – Junior (no word limit)	Joel MacManus	Stuff	
Feature Writer of the Year – Short Form (up to 3,500 words)	Nicholas Jones	NZ Herald/NZME	Michelle Duff (Stuff)
Feature Writer of the Year – Long Form (3,500+ words)	Aaron Smale	RNZ	Donna Chisholm (North & South and New Zealand Listener/Bauer Media); Mike White (North & South/Bauer Media)

=== Magazine ===
Award	Winner	Organisation	Runner-up
Best Magazine Cover	HOME New Zealand (Bauer Media)		
Best Magazine Design	HOME New Zealand (Bauer Media)		Metro (Bauer Media)
Best Newspaper-Inserted Magazine	Sunday Magazine (Sunday Star-Times/Stuff)		
Best Trade/Specialist Publication, Free Magazine and/or Website	Air Force News (Defence Public Affairs)		
Magazine of the Year	Metro (Bauer Media)		
Magazine of the Year	New Zealand Geographic (Kōwhai Media)		

=== Photography ===
Award	Winner	Organisation	Runner-up	Finalists
Photographer of the Year	Alan Gibson	NZ Herald/NZME	Mark Baker (Associated Press)	
Best Photo Story/Essay	Cameron McLaren	New Zealand Geographic/Kōwhai Publishing		
Best Photography – Features (Including Portraits, Fashion, Food and Architecture)	Braden Fastier	Nelson Mail/Stuff		
Best Photography – News	George Heard	The Press/Stuff		Mark Baker (The Press/Stuff); Chris Skelton (Stuff); Rosa Woods (Dominion Post/Stuff)
Judges' Prize for the Single Best News Photo	Stacy Squires	The Press, Dominion Post, Sunday Star-Times/Stuff		
Best Photography – Sport	Mark Baker	Associated Press	Iain McGregor (Stuff)	

=== Video Journalism and Broadcasting ===
Award	Winner	Organisation	Runner-up	Finalist
Video Journalist of the Year	Lawrence Smith	Stuff		
Best Video Journalist – Junior	Cass Marrett	Re:/TVNZ		
Best Feature or Current Affairs Video – Single Video Journalist	Luke McPake, "Death Bed: The Story of Kelly Savage"	RNZ		
Best TV/Video Documentary	Infinite Evil	Stuff Circuit/Stuff and Māori Television		
Best TV/Video News Item	Barbara Dreaver, "Measles lockdown"	1News/TVNZ		
Best TV/Video Current Affairs, Short (up to 10 mins)	Jehan Casinader, "Black Friday"	Sunday/TVNZ	"Harri Brown's story" (Seven Sharp/TVNZ)	Andy Jackson, "Fight of his life, Tony Pascoe" (Taranaki Daily News/Stuff)
Best TV/Video Current Affairs, Long (10 to 20 mins)	"Rediscovering Aotearoa: Aroha/Love"	Re:/TVNZ	"The Numbers Game" (Sunday/TVNZ)	"Oranga Tamariki uplift from Samoan family" (Checkpoint/RNZ)

=== Reporting ===
Award	Winner	Organisation	Runner-up	Finalists
Reporter of the Year	Guyon Espiner	RNZ	Phil Pennington (RNZ)	
Broadcast Reporter of the Year	Jehan Casinader	Sunday/TVNZ	Paula Penfold (Stuff Circuit and Māori Television)	
Political Journalist of the Year	Audrey Young	NZ Herald/NZME		
Business Journalist of the Year	Tim Hunter	NBR	Nikki Macdonald (Dominion Post and Stuff)	Katie Bradford (TVNZ); Bernard Hickey (Newsroom)
Sports Journalist of the Year	Dana Johannsen	Stuff		
Regional Journalist of the Year	Hamish McNeilly	The Press/Stuff		
Community Journalist of the Year	Virginia Fallon	Kāpiti Observer/Stuff		Sadie Beckman (Horowhenua Chronicle/NZME); Laurilee McMichael (Taupō & Tūrangi Weekender/NZME); Gus Patterson (Oamaru Mail/Allied Press)
Student Journalist of the Year	Ashley Stanley	Newsroom		
Best Reporter – Junior	Logan Church	RNZ		
Reporting – Crime and Justice	Blair Ensor	The Press/Stuff		
Reporting – Social Issues, Including Health and Education	Emma Russell	NZ Herald/NZME		
Reporting – General	Patrick Gower	Newshub/MediaWorks	Kurt Bayer (NZ Herald)	
Best Reporting – Māori Affairs	Te Aniwa Hurihanganui	RNZ	Hikurangi Jackson (Marae/TVNZ)	
Environmental/Sustainability Award	Kate Evans	New Zealand Geographic/Kōwhai Media		
Science Journalism Award	Eloise Gibson	Newsroom		
Best Individual Investigation	Patrick Gower, "Exposing white supremacy in New Zealand"	Newshub/MediaWorks	Matt Shand, "NZ First donations investigation" (Waikato Times, Dominion Post/Stuff)	
Best Team Investigation	"Product of Australia"	Stuff	"Eviction of Tamaki state housing tenants" (RNZ)	
Best (Single) News Story/Scoop	Melanie Reid	Newsroom		
Best Coverage of a Major News Event	Barbara Dreaver, "Samoan measles crisis"	1News/TVNZ	Thomas Mead, "Christchurch terror attacks" (Newshub/MediaWorks)	
Best Editorial Campaign or Project	"Oranga Tamariki uplifts"	Newsroom	Fighting the Demon (NZ Herald/NZME and Greenstone)	

=== Newspaper ===
Award	Winner	Organisation	Runner-up	Finalist
Voyager Newspaper of the Year	NZ Herald (NZME)			
Newspaper of the Year (more than 30,000 circulation)	NZ Herald (NZME)			The Press (Stuff)
Newspaper of the Year (up to 30,000 circulation)	Waikato Times (Stuff)			
Weekly Newspaper of the Year	Sunday Star-Times (Stuff)		Weekend Herald (NZME)	
Community Newspaper of the Year	The Beacon (Beacon Media Group)		Mountain Scene (Allied Press); The Courier, Timaru (Allied Press)	
Best Newspaper Front Page	The Press (Stuff)			

=== Digital ===
Award	Winner	Organisation	Runner-up
Website of the Year	nzherald.co.nz (NZME)		
Best News Website or App	nzherald.co.nz (NZME)		newsroom.co.nz
Best Innovation in Digital Storytelling	Fighting the Demon	nzherald.co.nz/NZME and Greenstone	newsroom.co.nz
Podcast – Best Narrative/Serial	White Silence	RNZ and Stuff	
Podcast – Best Episodic/Recurrent	He Kākano Ahau	RNZ and Ursula Grace Films	
Podcast – Best Episodic/Recurrent	Out of My Mind	Stuff	
