= 2016 Canon Media Awards =

2016 media awards ceremony

- Awarded for: Excellence in New Zealand print and online media.
- Sponsored by: Canon New Zealand
- Date: 20 May 2016
- Location: Museum of New Zealand Te Papa Tongarewa, Wellington
- Country: New Zealand
- Hosted by: Newspaper Publishers' Association
- Website: www.canon.co.nz/explore/canon-media-awards

The 2016 Canon Media Awards were hosted by the New Zealand Newspaper Publishers' Association on Friday 20 May 2016 at Museum of New Zealand Te Papa Tongarewa in Wellington, New Zealand. The Newspaper of the Year was The New Zealand Herald, and the Reporter of the Year was Matt Nippert of The New Zealand Herald.

== Photography ==
Photographer of the Year: Stephen Parker, Rotorua Daily Post

Junior Photographer of the Year: Grant Matthew, Fairfax Media

Videographer of the year: Iain McGregor, The Press

Best news photo: Peter Drury, Waikato Times/stuff.co.nz

Best news video: Andy Jackson, Fairfax Media

Best feature photo: Andy Jackson, Fairfax Media

Best feature video: Mike Scott, Fairfax Media

Best portrait photo: Stephen Parker, Rotorua Daily Post

Best sports photo: Stephen Parker, Rotorua Daily Post

Best sports video: Nick Reed, The New Zealand Herald

Best photo essay/slideshow: Richard Robinson, NZ Geographic

Best environmental photo: Richard Robinson, NZ Geographic

== Reporting ==
Reporter of the year: Matt Nippert, The New Zealand Herald

Junior reporter of the year: Chloe Winter, The Dominion Post

Regional journalist of the year: Aaron Leaman, Waikato Times

Community journalist of the year: Kris Dando, Kapi-Mana News

Business: Matt Nippert, The New Zealand Herald

Politics: Jared Savage and Bernard Orsman, The New Zealand Herald

Crime & justice: Jared Savage, The New Zealand Herald

Health: Ben Heather, The Dominion Post

Science & technology: Jamie Morton, The New Zealand Herald

Lifestyle: Kim Knight, Sunday Star-Times

Arts & entertainment: Kim Knight, Sunday Star-Times

Sport: Dana Johannsen, The New Zealand Herald

General: Lincoln Tan, The New Zealand Herald

== Feature writing ==
Feature writer of the year: Mike White, North & South

Junior feature writer of the year: Tess McClure, The Press/RNZ

Business: Anne Gibson, The New Zealand Herald

Politics: Rebecca Macfie, NZ Listener

Crime & justice: Mike White, North & South

Health: Rebecca Macfie, NZ Listener

Science & technology: Donna Chisholm, NZ Listener

Lifestyle: Naomi Arnold, Metro

Arts & entertainment: Hayden Donnell, 1972 Magazine/The Pantograph Punch

Sport: Peter Malcouronne, Metro

General: Michelle Duff, Your Weekend

== Opinion writing ==
Opinion writer of the year: Rachel Stewart, Taranaki Daily News/Manawatu Standard

Business: Chris Barton, The New Zealand Herald

Politics: Jane Clifton, NZ Listener

Humour/Satire: Alex Casey, The Spinoff

Sport: Paul Thomas, NZ Listener

General: Toby Manhire and Toby Morris, RNZ Online

== General ==
Reviewer of the Year: Simon Wilson, Metro

Cartoonist of the Year: Sharon Murdoch, Sunday Star-Times/The Press

Best headline: No Winner

Student journalist of the year: Tommy Livingston, The Dominion Post

Best investigation: Faces of Innocents Project Team, Fairfax Media

Scoop of the year: Luke Appleby, TVNZ

Best editorial campaign or project: Forgotten Millions, The New Zealand Herald

Best coverage of a major news even: Wellington Floods, The Dominion Post/stuff.co.nz

Best innovation in storytelling: Money in Politics, The New Zealand Herald

Website of the year: The Wireless

Best news site or app: TVNZ One News Now, www.tvnz.co.nz/one-news

Best sports site: nzherald.co.nz/sport

Best lifestyle / entertainment site: The Spinoff, www.thespinoff.co.nz

Best blog site: Public Address

Best digital artwork or graphics: Harkanwal Singh, insights.nzherald.co.nz

Best print artworks or graphics: Richard Dale, The New Zealand Herald

Best newspaper front page: The New Zealand Herald

Best Newspaper Inserted Magazine (NiM): Your Weekend, Fairfax Media

Newspaper of the year +30,000: The New Zealand Herald

Newspaper of the year -30,000: Taranaki Daily News, Fairfax Media

Weekly newspaper of the year: Waikato Times Weekend

Community newspaper of the year: Kapi-Mana News, Fairfax Media

Magazine of the year: HOME, Bauer

Best trade/specialist publication and/or site: Pro Photographer, Kowhai Media

Best magazine design: Micheal Hanly and Carolyn Lewis, Metro

Canon Newspaper of the Year: Waikato Times and Waikato Times Weekend

nib Health Journalism Scholarship – Junior: Jessica McAllen, The Spinoff/Sunday Star-Times

nib Health Journalism Scholarship – Senior: Donna Chisholm, North & South and NZ Listener

Editorial Leader of the Year: Rebecca Macfie, Barbara Fountain, New Zealand Doctor

Wolfson Fellowship: Rebecca Macfie, NZ Listener
