= 2015 Canon Media Awards =

- Awarded for: Excellence in New Zealand print and online media.
- Sponsored by: Competenz
- Date: 22 May 2015
- Location: SkyCity Convention Centre, Auckland
- Country: New Zealand
- Hosted by: Newspaper Publishers' Association
- Website: www.canon.co.nz/explore/canon-media-awards

The 2015 Canon Media Awards were hosted by Hilary Barry, for the New Zealand Newspaper Publishers' Association, on 22 May 2015 at the SkyCity Convention Centre in Auckland, New Zealand. The Newspaper of the Year was The New Zealand Herald, and the Reporter of the Year was Jared Savage of The New Zealand Herald.

== Winners ==
=== Photography ===
Photographer of the Year: Brett Phibbs, The New Zealand Herald

Junior Photographer of the Year: Charlotte Curd, Taranaki Daily News

Best News Picture: Peter Meecham, The New Zealand Herald

Best Sports Picture: Brett Phibbs, The New Zealand Herald

Best Portrait: Rob Suisted, Nature's Pic Images

Best Feature Photo: Chris Skelton, stuff.co.nz

Best Photo Essay/Slideshow: Hagen Hopkins, Getty Images

Best Environmental Photography: Kirk Hargreaves, The Press

=== Digital ===
Best Digital Cross-platform News Coverage: The New Zealand Herald

Best Cross-platform Campaign: The New Zealand Herald

Best Innovation in Multimedia Storytelling: The New Zealand Herald

Best Use of Interactive Graphics: The New Zealand Herald

Best Video: Asher Finlayson & Tony Wall - stuff.co.nz/Sunday Star-Times

Best Blog: Jarrod Gilbert

Best Website: nzherald.co.nz

=== Magazines ===
Magazine of the Year: NZ House & Garden

Best Trade/Professional Magazine: Pro Photographer

Best Magazine Design: Home

Best Magazine Cover: Architecture NZ

Magazine Feature Writer of the Year: Rebecca Macfie, NZ Listener

Magazine Feature Writer Business and Politics: Rebecca Macfie, NZ Listener

Magazine Feature Writer Health and Education: Jolisa Gracewood, North & South

Magazine Feature Writer Science and Technology: Donna Chisholm, North & South

Magazine Feature Writer Arts and Entertainment: Mike White, North & South

Magazine Feature Writer General: Rebecca Macfie, NZ Listener

=== Newspapers ===
Canon Newspaper of the Year: The New Zealand Herald

Newspaper of the Year (plus 30,000 circulation): The New Zealand Herald

Newspaper of the Year (up to 30,000 circulation): Taranaki Daily News

Weekly Newspaper of the Year: Sunday Star-Times

Community Newspaper of the Year: Mountain Scene

Best Newspaper Design: The New Zealand Herald

Best Newspaper Inserted Magazine: Viva - The New Zealand Herald

Reporter of the Year: Jared Savage, The New Zealand Herald

Junior Reporter of the Year: Talia Shadwell, The Dominion Post

Regional Reporter of the Year: Florence Kerr, Waikato Times

Community Reporter of the Year: Frank Marvin, Mountain Scene

Reporter Politics: David Fisher, The New Zealand Herald

Reporter Business: Matt Nippert, Sunday Star-Times

Reporter Crime and Justice: Jared Savage, The New Zealand Herald

Reporter Health and Education: David Fisher, The New Zealand Herald

Reporter Science and Technology: Vaughan Elder, Otago Daily Times

Reporter Arts and Entertainment: Shane Gilchrist, Otago Daily Times

Reporter Sport: Mark Geenty, The Dominion Post

Reporter General: Bevan Hurley, Herald on Sunday

Newspaper Feature Writer of the Year: Charles Anderson, The Press/Nelson Mail

Junior Newspaper Feature Writer of the Year: Jeremy Olds, Sunday magazine, Sunday Star-Times

Regional/Community Newspaper Feature Writer of the Year: Naomi Arnold, The Nelson Mail

Newspaper Feature Writer Business and Politics: Adam Dudding, Sunday Star-Times

Newspaper Feature Writer Crime and Justice: Amy Maas, Herald on Sunday

Newspaper Feature Writer Health and Education: Nikki Macdonald, The Dominion Post

Newspaper Feature Writer Science and Technology: Nikki Macdonald, The Dominion Post

Newspaper Feature Writer Arts and Entertainment: Greg Dixon, The New Zealand Herald

Newspaper Feature Writer Sport: Ben Stanley, Sunday Star-Times

Newspaper Feature Writer General: Charles Anderson, The Press/Nelson Mail

=== General ===
Best Investigation: Dylan Cleaver, The New Zealand Herald

Student Journalist of the Year: Don Rowe, Wintec/Sky Sport magazine/Waikato Times

Best Artwork: Richard Parker, Sunday Star-Times/The Dominion Post

Cartoonist of the Year: Chris Slane, NZ Listener

Best Columnist – humour/satire: Deborah Hill Cone, The New Zealand Herald

Best Columnist – general: Michele Hewitson, The New Zealand Herald

Columnist of the Year: Michele Hewitson, The New Zealand Herald

Editorial Writer of the Year: Peter Jackson, The Northland Age

Best Headline: Jo Knight, Sunday magazine, Sunday Star-Times

Reviewer of the Year: Anthony Byrt, Metro/NZ Listener

Fellow to Wolfson College, Cambridge: Shayne Currie

== See also ==
- Newspaper Publishers' Association awards
