= 2018 Voyager Media Awards =

- Awarded for: Excellence in New Zealand print and online media.
- Sponsored by: Voyager New Zealand
- Date: 11 May 2018
- Venue: Cordis, Auckland
- Country: New Zealand
- Hosted by: Newspaper Publishers' Association
- Website: www.voyagermediaawards.nz

The 2018 Voyager Media Awards (previously the Canon Media Awards) were presented on 11 May 2018 at the Cordis, Auckland hotel in New Zealand. Awards were made in the categories of digital, feature writing, general, magazines, newspapers, opinion writing, photography, reporting and videography.

== Judges ==
The judges for the 2018 awards were:

- Allan Baddock
- Andrew Holden
- Ant Phillips
- Bernard Lagan
- Bill Ralston
- Bruce Davidson
- Bill Moore
- Cate Brett
- Catherine Smith
- Cathy Strong
- Cheryl Norrie
- Clive Lind
- Daron Parton
- David King
- Deborah Coddington
- Deborah Hill Cone
- Debra Miller
- Donna Chisholm
- Fay McAlpine
- Felicity Anderson
- Foster Niumata
- Fran Tyler
- Gilbert Wong
- Grant Dyson
- Greg Dixon
- Irene Chapple
- James Hollings
- Jane Ussher
- Jenny Nicholls
- Jim Tully
- Jim Eagles
- John Hudson
- Joseph Barratt
- Kate Coughlan
- Kerryanne Evans
- Lauren Quaintance
- Lorelei Mason
- Louise Matthews
- Lynda van Kempen
- Matthew Straker
- Michael Field
- Michael Donaldson
- Michele Hewitson
- Miguel D'Souza
- Mike Fletcher
- Mike Valentine
- Mike Bowers
- Nathan Burdon
- Ngahuia Wade
- Nick Brown
- Nick Venter
- Nikki Mandow
- Noelle McCarthy
- Owen Poland
- Paul Cutler
- Paul Mansfield
- Paul Thompson
- Peter Fray
- Richard Harman
- Rick Neville
- Rob Taggart
- Ross Land
- Shane Taurima
- Susan Wood
- Te Anga Nathan
- Wayne Thompson

== Winners ==
=== Digital ===
- Best Innovation in Digital Storytelling: rnz.co.nz/Great Southern TV and Animation Research, NZ Wars: The Stories of Ruapekapeka
- "Best News Website or App". The New Zealand Herald.
- Website of the Year (joint): Newsroom.co.nz and Stuff

=== Feature writing ===
- Best first-person essay or feature: Peter Wells, The Spinoff
- Sport: Dana Johannsen NZ Herald
- Business and/or personal finance: Rebecca Macfie, New Zealand Listener
- Best feature writer – junior: Mirjam Guesgen, VetScript Magazine

=== Feature writing (long-form) ===
- Arts, entertainment and lifestyle: Simon Wilson, The Spinoff
- Health, education and/or general: Kirsty Johnston, NZ Herald
- Crime, justice and / or social issues: Mike White, North & South
- Feature Writer of the Year: Kate Evans, New Zealand Geographic and North & South

=== Feature writing (short-form) ===
- Arts, entertainment and lifestyle: Greg Bruce, NZ Herald
- Health, education and/or general: Greg Bruce, NZ Herald
- Crime, justice and / or social issues: Donna-Lee Biddle, Waikato Times
- Feature Writer of the Year: Tess McClure, VICE

=== General ===
- Best Headline or hook: Taylor Sincock, Newshub
- Best artwork/graphics (including interactive/motion graphics): Toby Morris, The Spinoff and The Wireless
- Cartoonist of the Year: Sharon Murdoch, The Press, Sunday Star-Times and The Dominion Post
- Reviewer of the Year: Charlotte Grimshaw New Zealand Listener and The Spinoff
- Best trade/specialist publication and/or website: NZ Retail and theRegister.co.nz
- nib Health Journalism Scholarship – junior: Sasha Borissenko, Newsroom.co.nz
- General nib Health Journalism Scholarship – senior: Barbara Fountain, New Zealand Doctor
- Science and Technology Award (joint): Donna Chisholm North & South, NZ Listener and Kate Evans, New Zealand Geographic and North & South
- Environmental / Sustainability Award: Isobel Ewing, Newshub
- Best editorial campaign or project: nzherald.co.nz - Break The Silence
- Editorial Executive of the Year: Murray Kirkness, Editor, NZ Herald
- Wolfson Fellowship: Matt Nippert, NZ Herald

=== Magazines ===
- Best magazine design: Metro magazine
- Magazine of the Year: New Zealand Geographic

=== Newspapers ===
- Best newspaper-inserted magazine: The Weekend Mix (Otago Daily Times)
- Best newspaper front page: Hawke's Bay Today
- Community Newspaper of the Year: Mountain Scene
- Newspaper of the Year (up to 30,000 circulation): Waikato Times
- Newspaper of the Year (more than 30,000 circulation): The Press
- Weekly Newspaper of the Year: Weekend Herald
- Voyager Newspaper of the Year: Weekend Herald

=== Opinion writing ===
- Opinion writing - general and/or sport: Leah McFall Sunday magazine, Sunday Star-Times
- Opinion writing - humour/satire: Dave Armstrong, The Dominion Post
- Opinion writing - business and/or personal finance: Duncan Greive, The Spinoff
- Opinion Writer of the Year: Steve Braunias, NZ Herald

=== Photography ===
- Best feature/photographic essay: Kent Blechynden, scoop.co.nz
- Best photography – general: John Borren, Bay of Plenty Times
- Best photography – portrait: Chris Skelton, The Press
- Best photography – sport: Andrew Cornaga, www.photosport.nz
- Best photography – news: Joseph Johnson, The Press
- Best photo – junior: Kavinda Herath, The Southland Times
- Photographer of the Year: Iain McGregor, Stuff

=== Reporting ===
- Reporter - arts, entertainment and lifestyle: Hikurangi Jackson, Marae
- Reporter - Health, education and/or general: Tony Wall, Stuff
- Reporter - crime, justice and/or social issues: Jared Savage, NZ Herald
- Reporter - Maori affairs: Oriini Kaipara, Maori Television
- Best (single) news story: Melanie Reid, Newsroom.co.nz - Politicians, police, and the payout
- Best investigation: Olivia Carville, NZ Herald - What becomes of the Broken Hearted
- Best team investigation: Stuff Circuit - The Valley, New Zealand's war in Afghanistan
- Best coverage of a major news event: rnz.co.nz - Election 2017
- Best reporter – junior: Nina Hindmarsh, Nelson Mail
- Student Journalist of the Year: Ruby Nyika, Waikato Times
- Community Journalist of the Year: Rob Drent, The Devonport Flagstaff
- Regional Journalist of the Year: Carmen Hall, Bay of Plenty Times
- Sports Journalist of the Year: Dana Johannsen, NZ Herald
- Business Journalist of the Year: Matt Nippert, NZ Herald
- Political Journalist of the Year: Audrey Young, NZ Herald
- Reporter of the Year: Melanie Reid, Newsroom.co.nz

=== Videography ===
- Best news video: George Heard, The Press
- Best feature video: Tasha Impey, Re:, TVNZ
- Best team video – news: 1 News Now - Edgecumbe's poor flood defenses
- Best team video – feature: The New Zealand Herald - Under The Bridge
- Best videographer – junior: Jaden McLeod, The New Zealand Herald Local Focus
- Videographer of the Year (joint): Alexander Robertson, NZME/Very Nice Productions and Mike Scott, The New Zealand Herald
