= Charlotte Grimshaw =

New Zealand writer (born 1966)

- Born: Charlotte Mary Stead; December 1966 (age 59); Auckland, New Zealand
- Education: University of Auckland
- Occupations: Novelist; short-story writer; columnist
- Spouse: Paul Grimshaw
- Children: 3
- Relatives: C. K. Stead (father); Kay Stead (mother)
- Writing career
- Years active: 1999–present
- Website: www.charlottegrimshawauthor.com

Charlotte Grimshaw (born December 1966) is a New Zealand novelist, short-story writer, columnist and former lawyer. She has written both fiction and non-fiction, often drawing on her legal experience. Her short stories and longer works often have interlinked themes and characters, and feature psychological and family dramas.

Since the publication of her debut novel Provocation (1999), she has received a number of significant literary awards including the Buddle Findlay Sargeson Fellowship in 2000, the Bank of New Zealand Katherine Mansfield Award for short fiction in 2006 and the Katherine Mansfield Menton Fellowship in 2023. Her short-story collection Opportunity (2007) won the Montana Award for Fiction and the Montana Medal for Fiction or Poetry at the 2008 Montana New Zealand Book Awards. She has also won awards for her book reviews and column writing.

== Family and early career ==
Grimshaw was born in Auckland in December 1966. She is the daughter of well-known New Zealand author and academic C. K. Stead and his wife Kay. She has an older brother and younger sister.

Grimshaw graduated from the University of Auckland with degrees in law and arts. She worked first for commercial law firm Simpson Grierson, and then for a criminal barrister, taking part in murder and manslaughter trials, before leaving the law to write fiction. While working at Simpson Grierson she met her husband, Paul Grimshaw, and chose to take his last name when they married, in part to separate herself from her father's work and to make her own way as a writer. They have three children.

== Literary career ==
=== Provocation ===
Grimshaw's first novel, Provocation (1999), drew on her experience as a criminal lawyer. The novel received positive reviews both in the United Kingdom (where it was first published) and in New Zealand. Catharina van Bohemen, reviewing for the New Zealand Review of Books, praised Grimshaw's "sense of humour, her delight in words, her ability to create atmosphere through evocative descriptions of the weather and the landscape, and the novel's strong conclusion", and said these strengths outweighed "occasional quibbles that there are too many characters or that nearly all the men's eyes are bloodshot". A review in The Times said Grimshaw "shows a level of accomplishment unusual in a first time writer, her shiny diamond-hard prose suiting her subject matter perfectly", and called the novel "a deliciously dark treat". It was shortlisted for the Creasey First Crime Fiction Award at the 1999 Crime Writers' Association Awards.

=== Guilt ===
Her second novel, Guilt (2000), followed the lives of four characters in Auckland in 1987.

=== Foreign City ===
Her third novel, Foreign City (2005), was split into three parts: the first about a young New Zealand painter living in London, the second about her daughter's life in Auckland and the third set in a fictional city. One reviewer commented that the book "could have degenerated into a mess", but Grimshaw's "deft hand with characterisation, irony and wit and an eye for deviant behaviour makes gripping reading".

=== Opportunity ===
Grimshaw's first collection of short stories, Opportunity, was published in 2007. The stories have interlinked themes and characters. Grimshaw described it as "a novel with a large cast of characters ... each story stands by itself, and at the same time adds to the larger one". Opportunity was shortlisted for the Frank O'Connor International Short Story Award, and won the Montana Award for Fiction and the Montana Medal for Fiction or Poetry at the Montana New Zealand Book Awards in 2008. The judges' comments said: "By turns touching, funny, dark, and redemptive, this is a book for reading through then re-reading in a different order, for following clues, for setting aside and thinking about, and for getting lost in."

=== Singularity ===
Her second interconnected short-story collection, Singularity, a companion volume to Opportunity, was published in 2009. Singularity was shortlisted for the Frank O'Connor International Short Story Award and for the South East Asia and Pacific section of the Commonwealth Writers Prize.

=== The Night Book, Soon and Starlight Peninsula ===
Her subsequent novels, The Night Book (2010), Soon (2012), and Starlight Peninsula (2015), further explored the cast of New Zealand characters and settings from her collections Opportunity and Singularity, including in particular David Hallwright, a National Party Prime Minister, and his friend Dr Simon Lampton, an obstetrician. The Night Book was shortlisted for the fiction prize at the New Zealand Post Book Awards, and Starlight Peninsula was longlisted for the Ngaio Marsh Award for Best Crime Novel in 2016. Reviewer Siobhan Harvey said: "This stunning novel not only brings an authentic conclusion to the knotted lives of its knotted characters, but also continues to provide the 'star-spangled Kiwi metropolis' slant Grimshaw brings to the epic contemporary serial." Grimshaw has said that in writing Opportunity and its successors she wanted "to explore our many and varied New Zealand voices, accurately, without sentimentality", and that she was inspired by La Comédie humaine, Balzac’s linked novels and stories.

In 2019 her novels The Night Book and Soon were adapted for television by TVNZ into the TV series, The Bad Seed. The novels were also republished by Penguin Random House as a compilation volume titled The Bad Seed.

=== Mazarine ===
Her seventh novel Mazarine was published in April 2018. The book is about a woman, the novel's unreliable narrator, whose young adult daughter seems to have gone missing in Europe. It was longlisted for the fiction prize at the 2019 Ockham New Zealand Book Awards. Grimshaw has described the novel as being "all about fake news. About not being allowed to be "selfie". About false narrative. Loss of the self. The fragmented self. Authoritarian rule." Charlotte Graham-McLay in The Spinoff described it as "at once domestic drama, psychological thriller — underscored with a buzzing note of menace about global terrorism and the surveillance state — and a sort of sensual coming-of-age tale".

=== The Mirror Book ===
In The Mirror Book (2021), a memoir, Grimshaw writes about her childhood and family relationships growing up in the Stead household. She has described the memoir as acting as a companion to her novel Mazarine, and had developed them together as part of a planned project called The Mirror Books: "They’re an examination of that material from two different angles. They’re concerned with two processes: on the one hand fictionalising, and on the other, the processing of fact that is real, and the creation of coherent narrative, a real story, and the use of that to map out a coherent sense of self." Catherine Woulfe, writing for The Spinoff, included The Mirror Book in her list of new books that are "genuinely great", and said that to read the memoir "is to watch a person finally stand up straight, stand in the light". She concluded by saying, "It’s March and I'm calling it: book of the year." Emma Espiner described Grimshaw as "a woman with the courage to test the edges of what she's been told is true, to see if it holds", and praised the book for its personal revelations and its connections to universal experiences and cultural narratives.

Rachael King, reviewing the book for the Academy of New Zealand Literature, noted the relationship of The Mirror Book to Mazarine and the short story "The Black Monk": "the three pieces of writing — novel, short story and now memoir — are a fascinating project, an examination of the very notion of autobiography: of fact, of fiction, and of truth". She described the writing as "astounding" and said it was "a book that needed to be written, for the writer to reinstate her place in the world, her family, her self". Steve Braunias, reviewing The Mirror Book for Newsroom, recounted his 2018 interview of Grimshaw and C. K. Stead at the Going West Ink & Blood session as being a "kind of like a preamble to The Mirror Book." He subsequently, in December 2021, called it not only "the very best book of non-fiction of 2021", but also "the very best book of any kind in 2021". In March 2022 it was shortlisted for the non-fiction prize at the Ockham New Zealand Book Awards.

=== Other work ===
In 2006, Grimshaw won the Bank of New Zealand Katherine Mansfield Award for her short story "Plane Sailing". She has contributed short stories to a number of anthologies, including Myth of the 21st Century (Reed 2006), The Best New Zealand Fiction Volumes Two, Three, Four and Five (Vintage), The New Zealand Book of the Beach Volumes One and Two (David Ling), Some Other Country (VUP) and Second Violins (Vintage, 2008).

Grimshaw wrote a monthly column for Metro for eight years, and received the Qantas Media Award for her column in 2009. She regularly contributes book reviews to the New Zealand Listener and The Spinoff. She has judged the Katherine Mansfield Award and the Sunday Star-Times Short Story Competition and is a literary advisor to the Grimshaw Sargeson Fellowship (formerly the Buddle Findlay Sargeson Fellowship).

== Prizes and awards ==
- Buddle Findlay Sargeson Fellowship (2000)
- Double finalist and prize winner in the Sunday Star-Times short story competition
- Bank of New Zealand Katherine Mansfield Award for short story "Plane Sailing" (2006)
- Book Council's Six Pack Prize for short story "The Yard Broom" (2007)
- Montana Award for Fiction and the Montana Medal for Fiction or Poetry at the 2008 Montana New Zealand Book Awards (2008)
- Montana Award for Reviewer of the Year (2008)
- Qantas Media Award (Columnist, General) (2009)
- Reviewer of the Year at the 2018 Voyager Media Awards
- Reviewer of the Year (joint) at the 2019 Voyager Media Awards
- Reviewer of the Year at the 2021 Voyager Media Awards
- Katherine Mansfield Menton Fellowship (2023)
- 2025 New Zealand Society of Authors President of Honour.

== Selected works ==
=== Novels ===
- Provocation (1999), London: Little, Brown
- Guilt (2000), London: Little, Brown
- Foreign City (2005), Auckland: Vintage
- The Night Book (2010), Auckland: Vintage
- Soon (2012), Auckland: Vintage; (2013): London: Jonathan Cape; (2013): Anansi, Canada
- Starlight Peninsula (2015), Auckland: Vintage
- Mazarine (2018), Auckland: Vintage
- The Bad Seed (2019), Auckland: Vintage

=== Memoir ===
- The Mirror Book: A Memoir (2021), Auckland: Vintage

=== Short story collections ===
- Opportunity (2007), Auckland: Vintage
- Singularity (2009), Auckland: Vintage; London: Jonathan Cape
