= Tayi Tibble =

New Zealand poet

- Born: 1995 (age 30–31) Wellington, New Zealand
- Occupation: Poet
- Education: MA (creative writing), Victoria University of Wellington (2017)
- Notable works: Poūkahangatus (2018); Rangikura (2021)

Tayi Tibble (born 1995) is a New Zealand poet. Her poetry reflects Māori culture and her own family history. Her first collection of poetry, Poūkahangatus (2018), received the Jessie Mackay Prize for Poetry at the 2019 Ockham New Zealand Book Awards. Both Poūkahangatus and her second collection, Rangikura (2021), have been published in the United States and the United Kingdom, and in 2023 she was the first Māori writer to have work published in The New Yorker.

== Life and career ==
Tibble was born in Wellington in 1995, and from age 7 grew up in Porirua where she attended Aotea College. She is the oldest of seven children and decided she wanted to become a writer at age 8. She descends from the iwi (tribes) of Ngāti Porou and Te Whānau-ā-Apanui. She has an undergraduate degree in history.

=== Poūkahangatus ===
Tibble completed a Masters in Creative Writing at the International Institute of Modern Letters (based at Victoria University of Wellington) in 2017, and received the Adam Foundation Prize in Creative Writing for her work In a Fish Tank Filled with Pink Light. That work subsequently became her first collection, Poūkahangatus, which was published in 2018 by Victoria University Press. It received the Jessie Mackay Prize for Poetry (the best first poetry book award) at the 2019 Ockham New Zealand Book Awards. Anahera Gildea, reviewing the collection for Landfall, described her poetry as a "'a new kind of beauty' that employs clever image piling techniques, layering of ideas, registers and codes, and enables her to emerge as a new voice requiring the reader to look at all things afresh", and the collection as "surely the breakthrough collection of the year, if not the decade".

In July 2022 Poūkahangatus was published in the United States by Knopf, and in the United Kingdom by Penguin Books. In November 2022 it was named by The New Yorker as one of the best books of 2022 so far. The New York Times commented:

This chatty, winsome debut by a young New Zealand poet mines family history, Maori myth and the residue of pop culture to fashion a striking sensibility in which superstition wards off ghosts and a David Bowie sticker on a laptop resembles "a tiny ... genderless angel lit up by green charger light."

=== Rangikura ===
Tibble's second collection, Rangikura, was published in 2021. The poems are based in part on her own experiences growing up as a young Māori woman, and many of the poems were written during the 2020 COVID-19 lockdown. She describes the book as being more personal than her first book, and as "pay[ing] tribute to modern Māori culture by using the humour, sexuality and friendship that encapsulates my generation". Reviewer Hamesh Wyatt, writing for the Otago Daily Times, described it as a "fiery new work" and an "immersive trip". Paula Green said in her review:

Tayi's collection is framed by an opening poem and a last poem, ancestor poems, like two palms holding the poetry tenderly, lovingly. Hold this book in your reading hands and check out the electricity when you stand in the river, the ocean. Reading Tayi spins you so sweetly, so sharply, along the line, off the line. I love this book so much.

In March 2022, Rangikura was shortlisted for the Mary and Peter Biggs Award for Poetry at the Ockham New Zealand Book Awards. In April 2024 it was published by Knopf in the United States, and by Penguin in the United Kingdom. The New York Times described it as a "coming-of-age narrative" with an "undercurrent of pride and defiance".

=== Other work ===
Tibble's work has been published in Pantograph Punch, The Spinoff, The Wireless, Sport and the anthology The Friday Poem: 100 New Zealand Poems (edited by Steve Braunias). In 2018 she read her poem "Hoki Mai" at an Anzac Day parade attended by 25,000 people in Wellington.

From 2019 to 2024 Tibble worked as a publicist at Te Herenga Waka University Press. In 2019 she joined Pantograph Punch as a staff writer. In 2022 she also worked as an astrologist for Metro magazine. She has previously worked at Toi Māori Aotearoa.

She has been described by The New York Times as an "it girl" and style icon. In 2021 she appeared in the music video for Lorde's single Solar Power. Her poems were included in the show UPU presented at the Silo Theatre as part of the Auckland Arts Festival in 2020, and at the Kia Mau Festival in 2021. She received the award for best personal essay at the 2020 Voyager Media Awards for her essay "Ihumātao: Everyone was there, e hoa".

In May 2022 Tibble headlined two events at the PEN World Voices festival on international and indigenous poetry. In July 2023 her poem "Creation Story" was published in The New Yorker; she is the fifth New Zealander and first Māori writer to have work published in the magazine.
