= Trace Hodgson =

New Zealand cartoonist

Trace Hodgson (born 1958) is a New Zealand cartoonist. He began cartooning for the Christchurch Press in 1979. His work has appeared in the New Zealand Listener, NZ Truth, Christchurch Press, New Zealand Times, Nelson Mail and the Dominion Post. He became the Listener's political cartoonist in 1984.
