= 2019 Voyager Media Awards =

- Awarded for: Excellence in New Zealand print and online media.
- Sponsored by: Voyager New Zealand
- Date: 17 May 2019
- Location: Cordis, Auckland
- Country: New Zealand
- Hosted by: Newspaper Publishers' Association
- Website: www.voyagermediaawards.nz

The 2019 Voyager Media Awards (previously the Canon Media Awards) were held at the Cordis, Auckland on 17 May 2019. Awards were made in the categories of digital, feature writing, general, magazines, health journalism, scholarships, newspapers, opinion writing, photography, reporting and videography.

== Judges ==
The judges for the 2019 awards were Drew Ambrose, Felicity Anderson, Monica Attard, Allan Baddock, John Baker, Joseph Barratt, Victoria Birkinshaw, Joanne Black, Mike Bowers, Nick Brown, Melanie Burford, Scott Campbell, Irene Chapple, Donna Chisholm, Deborah Coddington, Glenn Conway, Paul Cutler, Bruce Davidson, Mike Dickison, Greg Dixon, Michael Donaldson, Kerryanne Evans, Michael Field, Mike Fletcher, Melissa Gardi, Richard Harman, Isabella Harrex, Wayne Hay, Michele Hewitson, Deborah Hill Cone, Andrew Holden, James Hollings, Ali Ikram, Jim Kayes, Bruce Mahalski, Bruce Morris, Lisa Morton, Bernard Lagan, Lorelei Mason, Debra Millar, Bill Moore, Jenny Nicholls, Cheryl Norrie, Foster Niumata, Antony Phillips, Owen Poland, Lauren Quaintance, Terry Quinn, Maramena Roderick, Neil Sanderson, Kamahl Santamaria, Catherine Smith, Barry Stewart, Matt Straker, Catherine Strong, Alan Sunderland, Rob Taggart, Shane Taurima, Paul Thompson, Wayne Thompson, Greg Treadwell, Jim Tully, Fran Tyler, Lynda van Kempen, Nick Venter, Ngahuia Wade, Tina Wickliffe, Emily Wilson, Sonya Wilson, and Gilbert Wong.

== Winners ==
=== General ===
Outstanding Achievement Award University of Canterbury in recognition of 50 years of running a postgraduate journalism programme

Opinion Writer of the Year Simon Wilson (NZ Herald/NZME)

Magazine of the Year New Zealand Geographic

=== Digital ===
Best innovation in digital storytelling Caught (Stuff)

Best news website or app Stuff

Website of the Year The Spinoff

=== Features ===
General Jehan Casinader (Sunday / TVNZ)

Crime and/or social issues Teuila Fuatai (newsroom.co.nz)

Best arts, entertainment and/or lifestyle portfolio Kim Knight (Canvas, NZ Herald / NZME)

=== Feature writing ===
Best first-person essay or feature Michelle Langstone (North & South / Bauer Media Group)

Best feature writer – junior Ellen Rykers (New Zealand Geographic / Kōwhai Media)

Feature Writer of the Year (short form) James Borrowdale (VICE)

Feature Writer of the Year (long-form) Charlie Mitchell (Stuff)

=== General ===
Best headline, caption or hook Michael Donaldson (NZ Herald)

Best artwork / graphics Toby Morris (The Spinoff)

Cartoonist of the Year Rod Emmerson (NZ Herald)

Reviewer of the Year Joint winners Charlotte Grimshaw (New Zealand Listener/Bauer Media Group) and Diana Wichtel (New Zealand Listener/Bauer Media)

Editorial Executive of the Year Patrick Crewdson (Stuff)

Wolfson Fellowship Patrick Crewdson (Stuff)

=== Magazines ===
Best magazine cover North & South / Bauer Media Group

Best magazine design HOME New Zealand

Best newspaper-inserted magazine NZ Herald's Viva magazine

Best trade/specialist publication, free magazine or website Farmers Weekly

Magazine of the Year New Zealand Geographic / Kōwhai Media

=== nib Health Journalism Scholarships ===
nib Health Journalism Scholarships – junior Hannah Martin (Stuff)

nib Health Journalism Scholarships – senior Catherine Hutton (RNZ)

=== Newspapers ===
Best newspaper front page Sunday Star-Times / Stuff

Community Newspaper of the Year The Beacon / Beacon Publishing Group

Newspaper of the Year (up to 30,000 circulation) Waikato Times (Stuff)

Newspaper of the Year (more than 30,000 circulation) NZ Herald (NZME)

Weekly Newspaper of the Year Sunday Star-Times (Stuff)

Voyager Newspaper of the Year Sunday Star-Times (Stuff)

Best (single) news story Madeleine Chapman (The Spinoff) and Nicholas Jones (NZ Herald), joint winners

Best individual investigation Nicholas Jones (NZ Herald).

Best team investigation Stuff

=== Opinion writing ===
Opinion writing – general and/or sport Max Christoffersen (Waikato Times / Stuff)

Opinion writing – humour / satire Madeleine Chapman (The Spinoff)

Opinion Writer of the Year Simon Wilson (NZ Herald)

=== Photography ===
Best feature/photographic essay David White (Stuff)

Best photography – general Stephen Jaquiery (Otago Daily Times/Allied Press)

Best photography – portrait Alden Williams (Stuff)

Best photography – news and/or sport Braden Fastier (Nelson Mail / Stuff)

Best photography junior George Heard (The Press)

Photographer of the Year Braden Fastier (Nelson Mail / Stuff) and Chris Skelton (Stuff)

=== Reporting ===
Reporting – general Melanie Reid (newsroom.co.nz)

Crime and/or social issues Kirsty Johnston (NZ Herald / NZME)

Best reporting – Maori affairs Miriama Kamo (Sunday and Marae / TVNZ)

Environmental/Sustainability Award Charlie Mitchell (Stuff)

Science and Technology Award Eloise Gibson (newsroom.co.nz)

Best individual investigation Nicholas Jones (NZ Herald / NZME)

Best team investigation Stuff (Sex offender/motel investigations)

Best (single) news story / scoop Madeleine Chapman (The Spinoff) and Nicholas Jones (NZ Herald / NZME)

Best coverage of a major news event Newshub / MediaWorks (Royal Tour)

Best editorial campaign or project Stuff (New Zealand Made/ Nā Niu Tireni)

Best reporter – junior Mackenzie Smith (RNZ)

Student Journalist of the Year Luke Kirkness (NZ Herald)

Community Journalist of the Year Torika Tokalau (Stuff, Western Leader)

Regional Journalist of the Year Hamish McNeilly (Stuff, The Press)

Sports Journalist of the Year Dana Johannsen (Stuff)

Business Journalist of the Year Calida Stuart-Menteath (National Business Review)

Political Journalist of the Year Tova O'Brien (Newshub)

Broadcast Reporter of the Year Janet McIntyre (Sunday / TVNZ)

Reporter of the Year Phil Pennington (RNZ)

=== Videography ===
Best news video (single videographer) Dan Cook (RNZ)

Best feature video (single videographer) Anna Harcourt (Re: / TVNZ)

Best team video – news Newshub / MediaWorks (Road toll devastation through the eyes of first responders)

Opinion writing – general and/or sport Best team video – feature Sunday / TVNZ (P Babies)

Best videography – junior Rosa Woods (The Dominion Post)

Videographer of the Year Tim Flower (VICE)
