= Allan Hawkey =

New Zealand cartoonist

Allan Charles Hawkey (born 1941) is a cartoonist based in Hamilton, New Zealand. He was editorial cartoonist for the Timaru Herald between 1982 and 1990, signing himself as 'Hawkeye'. His cartoons have appeared in the Waikato Times since 1998 (daily from 2001).
