= Joanna Norris =

New Zealand journalist

Joanna Norris is a New Zealand-based journalist, who in 2012 became the first woman editor of The Press. After leaving that position in 2017, she led ChristchurchNZ, a promotion and economic development agency in Christchurch. In 2026, she was appointed to lead the newsroom at TVNZ.

== Career ==
Norris was appointed as editor of The Press in 2012, having previously worked as a journalist at the newspaper. She is the first woman to become its editor. Norris was chief reporter at The Press before moving to the Middle East in 2008, where she was involved in the launch of The National, an English language newspaper in Abu Dhabi. She has also worked at senior level for newspapers in the United Kingdom. She returned to New Zealand from Abu Dhabi in 2010, and before taking up her present position in October 2012, was digital editor of Dompost.co.nz, the online version of The Dominion Post. Norris has won several industry awards during her career.

Norris left The Press when a new agency was formed in the city called ChristchurchNZ responsible for promotion and economic development. She has been the head of this organisation since mid-October 2017. ChristchurchNZ represents the interests of the Canterbury Development Corporation (CDC), Christchurch and Canterbury tourism, international education providers, the convention bureau (responsible for attracting conventions to be held in the city), and the Christchurch City Council's major events team.

She then worked as managing director of Stuff, before being appointed as executive editor of news at TVNZ in 2026.

Business positions
Preceded by Andrew Holden	Editor of The Press; 2012–2017	Succeeded by Kamala Hayman
