= Kamala Hayman =

New Zealand newspaper journalist and editor

Kamala Hayman is a New Zealand newspaper journalist and editor. In 2018, she was appointed editor of The Press, a metropolitan daily newspaper in Christchurch, New Zealand.

== Biography ==
Hayman studied journalism at the University of Canterbury. She was a journalist in London, England, for ten years, where she wrote about politics and crime for a local newspaper, and worked for BBC's News Online service. She moved to Christchurch in 2001. After working as a reporter for The Press, she became chief reporter and then editor of thepress.co.nz website. In the 2004 Qantas Media Awards, Hayman won the Environment and Conservation category for her article "DOC to remove hundreds of baches".

In 2015, Hayman was appointed deputy editor, Canterbury and Otago region by her then-employer, Fairfax Media. In 2017, Hayman was executive producer of a true crime podcast, Black Hands, which explored the 1994 Bain family murders. The series topped the podcast charts in New Zealand, Australia, Britain and Ireland.

In 2017, Joanna Norris resigned her position as editor of The Press and Hayman was appointed acting editor. She was confirmed as editor in 2018.

Business positions
| Preceded by Joanna Norris | Editor of The Press; 2018–present | Incumbent |
