= Fay McAlpine =

New Zealand designer, typographer and academic

Fay McAlpine (born 1964) is a New Zealand designer, typographer and academic at Massey University.

She primarily teaches in the visual communication design programme, particularly in the areas of graphic design, with a strong interest in the typographical aspect of visual communication. Her speciality is teaching typographic fundamentals, type history, publication design, typographic practice in spatial environments and interpretive, navigational or informational typography. McAlpine's "passion for typography has influenced generations of young talent" through her teaching.

Before moving into academia, McAlpine spent 15 years in commercial practice including developing corporate identity systems and publications for DesignWorks, working in their Wellington, Auckland and Sydney offices, and designing stamps for New Zealand Post. Blocks of her stamp designs are held in the Museum of New Zealand Te Papa Tongarewa.

McAlpine was a judge for the 2018 Voyager Media Awards.
