= Emma Wehipeihana =

New Zealand journalist and doctor (born 1983/4)

- Born: 1983 or 1984 (age 42–43)
- Other name: Emma Espiner
- Education: University of Auckland (BM MS, 2020)
- Occupations: Broadcaster; writer; doctor
- Notable work: There's a Cure For This (memoir, 2023)
- Children: 1
- Awards: Opinion Writer of the Year 2020 and Best Narrative Podcast 2021 (Voyager Media Awards)

Emma Elizabeth Wehipeihana (previously Espiner from 2012 to 2023; born 1983 or 1984) is a New Zealand broadcaster, writer and doctor. She won Opinion Writer of the Year at the 2020 Voyager Media Awards and Best Narrative Podcast at the 2021 Voyager Media Awards. Her 2023 memoir There's a Cure For This won the best first book award in the general non-fiction category at the Ockham New Zealand Book Awards.

== Biography ==
Wehipeihana grew up in Wellington. Her mother, Colleen Smith, was a feminist activist and Wehipeihana was involved in feminist protests from a young age. Of Māori descent, Wehipeihana has whakapapa (heritage) to the Ngāti Tukorehe and Ngāti Porou iwi. She graduated with Bachelor of Medicine and Bachelor of Surgery degrees from the University of Auckland in 2020.

Wehipeihana has written as a columnist for Newsroom. In 2020, she won Opinion Writer of the Year at the 2020 Voyager Media Awards. In 2020 she hosted the podcast Getting Better for Radio New Zealand about her experiences as a Māori medical student. The podcast won the Best Narrative Podcast award at the 2021 Voyager Media Awards.

In 2023, Wehipeihana published a memoir titled There's a Cure For This. The book won the best first book award for general non-fiction at the 2024 Ockham New Zealand Book Awards, and was shortlisted for the overall general non-fiction award. At the ceremony, Wehipeihana said she wanted politicians in attendance to hear "that the front line of the health system can speak back".

=== Personal life ===
Wehipeihana married journalist Guyon Espiner in 2012, and had a daughter. The couple separated in 2023, after which she returned to using her maiden name.
