= Toby Manhire =

New Zealand journalist and columnist

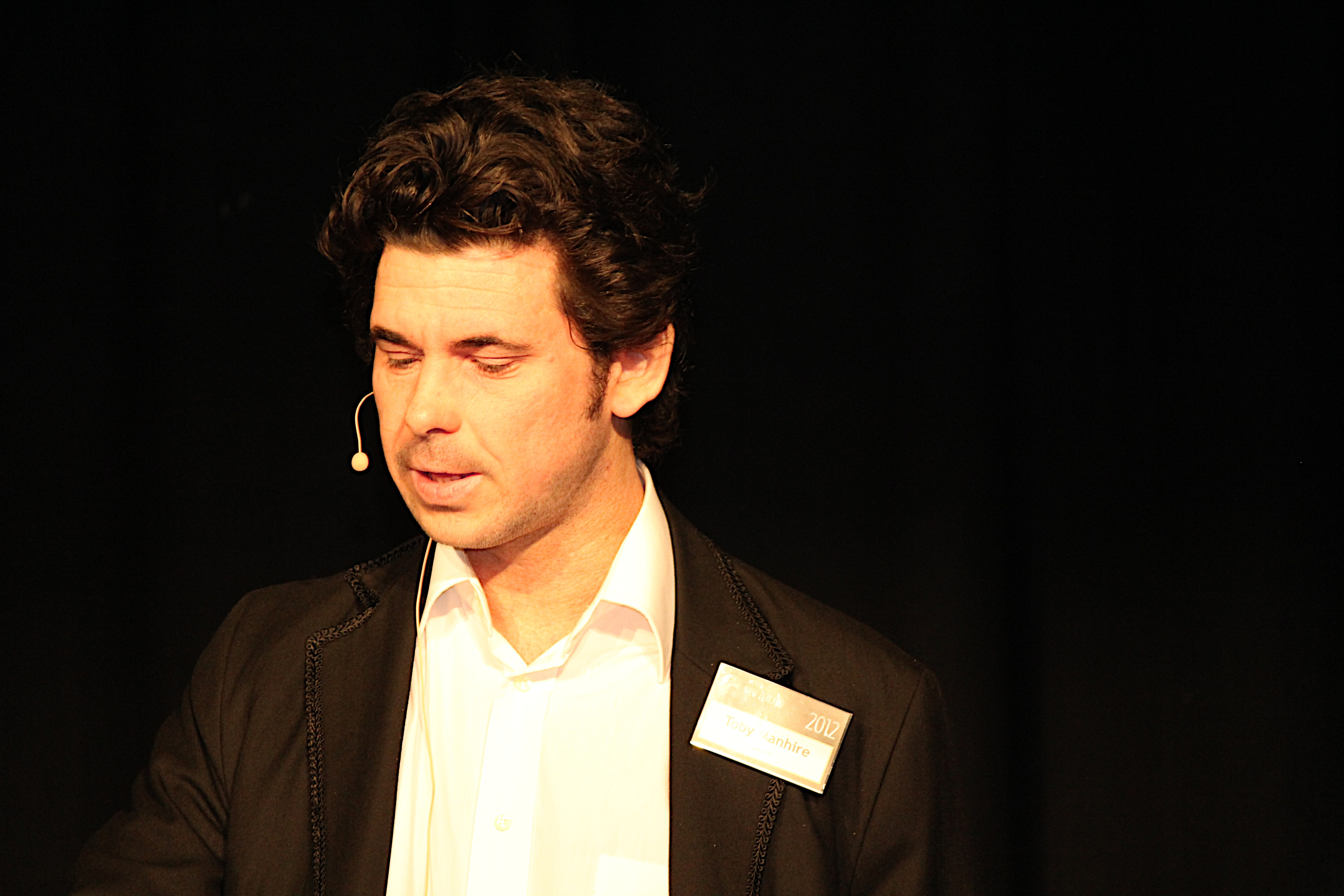
- Manhire in 2012 as host of the New Zealand Open Source Awards
- Occupation: Journalist
- Relatives: Bill Manhire

Toby Manhire (born 16 March; year unknown) is a New Zealand journalist and columnist, and the editor at-large of online magazine The Spinoff. He is the son of poet Bill Manhire.

== Career ==
Manhire was editor of student magazine Salient in 1997. From 2000 to 2010 he worked at The Guardian, and has edited The Guardian's comment pages. His work has also appeared in The New Zealand Herald and the New Zealand Listener, among other publications. In 2012, he edited a book The Arab Spring: Rebellion, Revolution, and a New World Order, published by Guardian Books.

Manhire is active on Twitter, and was included in Bryce Edwards and Geoffrey Miller's list of the top 100 tweeters to follow in the 2014 election. On reviewing the list, social media blogger Matthew Beveridge concluded that Manhire's place was deserved: "Toby always has a quick comment for whatever is happening. Engages in a lot of discussions, and doesn’t retweet too much. Overall deserving of his place on the list."

In 2016, he began hosting a political podcast titled Gone By Lunchtime alongside journalist Annabelle Lee-Mather and PR consultant Ben Thomas. The podcast's guests have included Jacinda Ardern and Mihingarangi Forbes. In May 2017, he became the politics editor at the New Zealand online magazine The Spinoff, becoming editor in January 2018. In 2019, Manhire profiled Ardern for The Guardian. Manhire connected microbiologist Siouxsie Wiles with Spinoff creative director Toby Morris, with the two partnering to produce globally-popular shareable content containing factual information about COVID-19.

Manhire was succeeded as Spinoff editor by Madeleine Chapman on 1 November 2021. He shares a birthday with Chapman; both were born on 16 March.
