= Guyon Espiner =

New Zealand journalist

- Born: 31 December 1970 (age 55)
- Education: University of Canterbury
- Occupation: Broadcaster
- Employer(s): Radio New Zealand National; New Zealand Listener
- Known for: Broadcasting
- Spouse: Emma Espiner (m. 2012–2023)

Guyon Espiner (born 31 December 1970) is an investigative journalist at Radio New Zealand. He has worked in print, radio and television for more than 20 years, as a reporter, political editor and anchor.

== Career ==
Espiner grew up in Christchurch. His mother, Mary Espiner, died in 2001. His father, Eric Espiner, is an endocrinologist in Christchurch. Espiner Jr. began his career at the University of Canterbury, where he completed a Bachelor of Arts in English literature and a diploma in journalism.

He spent ten years as a newspaper journalist, including a stint as political editor of the Sunday Star Times, before transitioning into television with TVNZ in 2003.

He was appointed TVNZ's political editor in 2006 and anchored several programmes, including Agenda, Q+A, and Breakfast, developing a reputation as a dogged political interviewer.

At the end of 2011, Espiner left TVNZ to join the reporting team of TV3's current affairs programme 60 Minutes. Later he hosted two new current affairs shows on TV3, 3rd Degree and The Vote.

In 2014, Espiner left television and took over co-hosting of the prominent daily news programme Morning Report on Radio New Zealand National with Susie Ferguson.

He left hosting duties in 2019 and now works as an investigative journalist for Radio New Zealand and continues to write for Listener Magazine.

== Personal life ==
Espiner married Emma Wehipeihana in a private ceremony on 5 February 2012. The couple separated in 2023.

He revealed he has type 1 diabetes in 2018 after a hospital scare.

== See also ==
- List of New Zealand television personalities
