= New Zealand Geographic =

New Zealand magazine

- January–February 2022 issue
- Editor: Catherine Woulfe
- Categories: Geography, culture, heritage, society, environment, exploration, conservation
- Frequency: Every two months
- Publisher: Kowhai Media Ltd
- First issue: January 1989
- Country: New Zealand
- Based in: Auckland
- Website: www.nzgeo.com
- ISSN: 0113-9967
- OCLC: 813218011

New Zealand Geographic is a bi-monthly magazine founded in 1989 and published by Kōwhai Media of Auckland, New Zealand. In the format popularised by National Geographic, it focuses on the biodiversity, geography, and culture of New Zealand, Antarctica, and nearby Pacific Islands. The magazine showcases documentary and editorial photography, and each year runs a national Photographer of the Year competition.

== History ==
New Zealand Geographic was founded in 1988 by Kennedy Warne and John Woods, and the first issue was Jan-Feb 1989. Warne, who served as editor for 15 years, had a Master's degree in marine biology, which informed the magazine's early focus on conservation and natural history. He was followed in 2004 by Warren Judd as editor.

In the July–August 2008 issue, the editor announced the formation of a New Zealand Geographic Society, renamed in the next issue to the New Zealand Geographic Trust, with all subscribers counted as members. It announced its first research award in the November–December 2008 issue.

Warren Judd was followed as editor by James Frankham, who co-founded Kōwhai Media Ltd in 2012.

In 2014, the magazine marked 25 years in print by digitising its entire back catalogue and making it available free to subscribers. It was also licensed by the Ministry of Education and supplied free to teachers, students, and many public libraries. Those institutional subscriptions were soon supplying 20% of the magazine's revenue. In 2016, a metered paywall was introduced for non-subscribers, with five items available free a month. As well as the magazine's story and photography archive, the website included 160 hours of natural history documentaries from NHNZ, the former Natural History Unit of TVNZ.

In 2016, the magazine has 10,500 paying subscribers, in addition to institutional subscriptions. It had a small staff, consisting of an editor/publisher, developer, and web archivist, with magazine content supplied by freelancers. In 2017, Frankham was succeeded as editor by Rebekah White. White joined Kōwhai in 2014 after two years as assistant editor of Good magazine, and was editor of Kōwhai publication Pro Photographer before taking over at New Zealand Geographic. In September 2022, White took a sabbatical to study at Columbia University on a Fulbright scholarship, and was replaced by Catherine Woulfe.

== Profile ==
New Zealand Geographic, like other "national" geographic magazines in English-speaking countries, follows the model of National Geographic's mixture of factual stories, documentary photography, and maps. The magazine's first issue, 1989, proclaimed "New Zealand Geographic will examine the important geographic themes of our times," and included a welcome by geographer Kenneth Cumberland, but the magazine is not connected to academic geography. Unlike some other geographical magazines like Australian Geographic and Canadian Geographic, it is not published by a national Geographical Society – the New Zealand Geographical Society has its own journal, New Zealand Geographer – but by Kōwhai Media, an independent Auckland publisher; it also has no connection with National Geographic.

New Zealand Geographic is issued every two months. A representative issue, in 2007, was 112 pages with little advertising, comprising 5–6 articles (70 per cent of the pages), an editorial, letters, several pages of news, a two-page "Weather" article, and on average four book reviews. Over half the pages were photographs. One significant theme in the magazine is wildlife conservation and environmental management, covered in its early years in association with the New Zealand Department of Conservation. The magazine's focus is New Zealand and the Pacific, and articles can be on technology, industry, history, biology, geology, astronomy, culture, and exploration; there are occasional biographies of significant individuals, usually explorers, scientists, or artists. Locations covered beyond the Pacific are those with local relevance, such as New Zealanders at war, New Zealand peacekeepers or volunteers abroad, or New Zealand explorers. Increasingly the coverage of the magazine has shifted from natural history to social issues such as methamphetamine usage and the Christchurch mosque shootings.

== Photographer of the Year Award ==
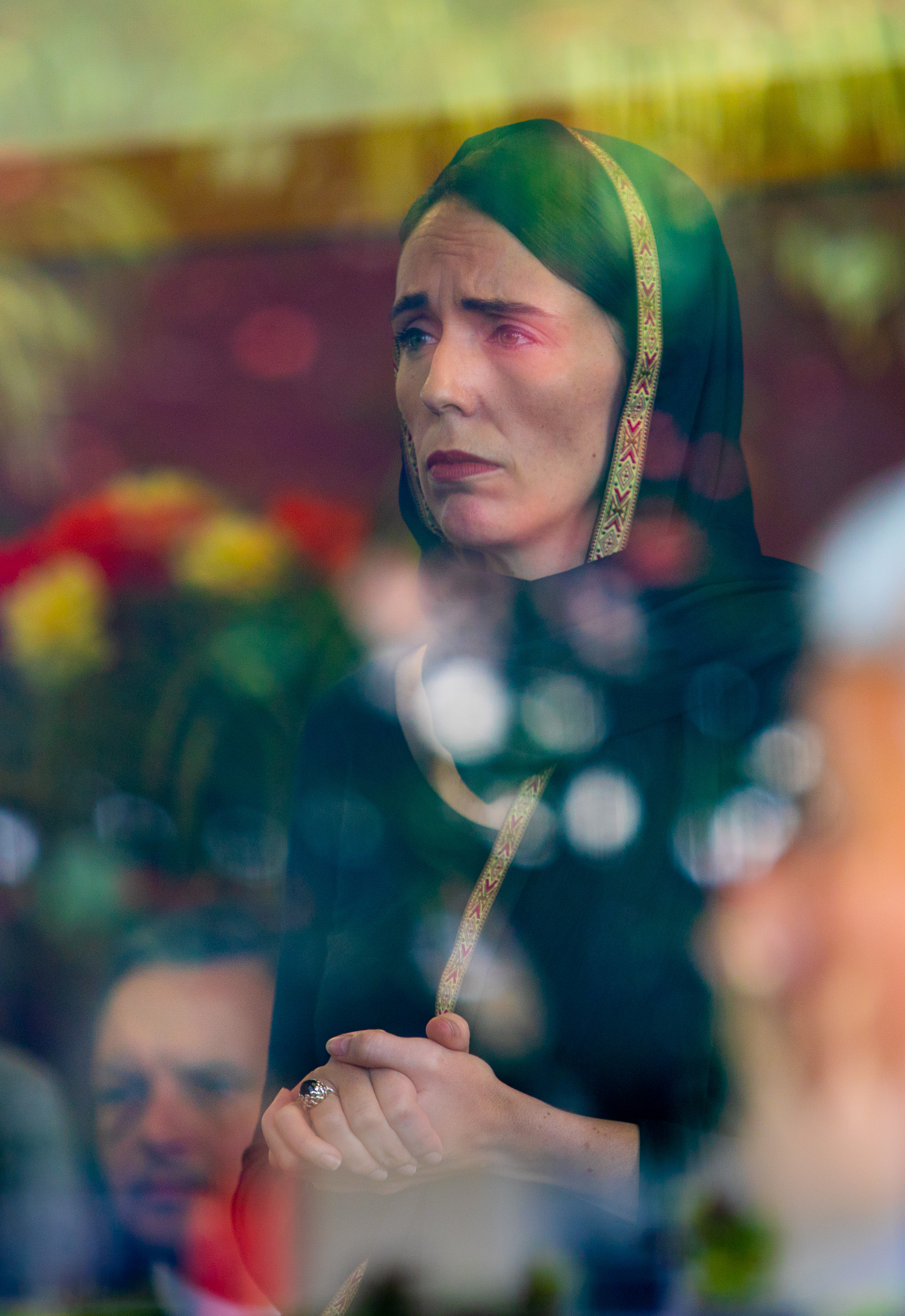
Kirk Hargreaves' photograph of Prime Minister Jacinda Ardern visiting the Muslim community at the Phillipstown Community Centre the day after the Christchurch mosque shootings; winner of the 2019 Photographer of the Year award

New Zealand Geographic features high-quality photography, and attracts wildlife, landscape, and social commentary photographers. Since 2006, the magazine has run a Photographer of the Year competition for news and editorial photography, open to amateurs and professionals, with categories that include wildlife, landscape, photo-story, built environment, and society. In 2016, there were over 3000 entries, including a new aerial photography category for drone, helicopter, and plane footage; the Photographer of the Year was Nelson freelance photographer Tim Cuff, for a helicopter shot of flooding in Tākaka. The 2019 Society category was won by Christchurch photographer Kirk Hargreaves, with a photograph of Jacinda Ardern a day after the Christchurch mosque shootings. In 2021, there were over 6000 entries – a record – and the winner was Nelson Mail photojournalist Braden Fastier.

== Awards ==
- 1994: inaugural Communications Media Award for 'excellence in journalism'.
- 2017 Canon Media Awards: Magazine of the Year
- 2018: Best Magazine – Current Affairs and Business, Supreme Webstar Magazine of the Year
- 2018 Voyager Media Awards: Magazine of the Year
- 2019 Voyager Media Awards: Magazine of the Year
- 2020 Voyager Media Awards: Magazine of the Year (shared with Metro)
- 2022 Webstar Magazine Media Awards: Supreme Magazine, Best Journalist (Consumer Special Interest, Current Affairs, Business and Trade), Best Photographer
