= Sharon Murdoch =

New Zealand cartoonist

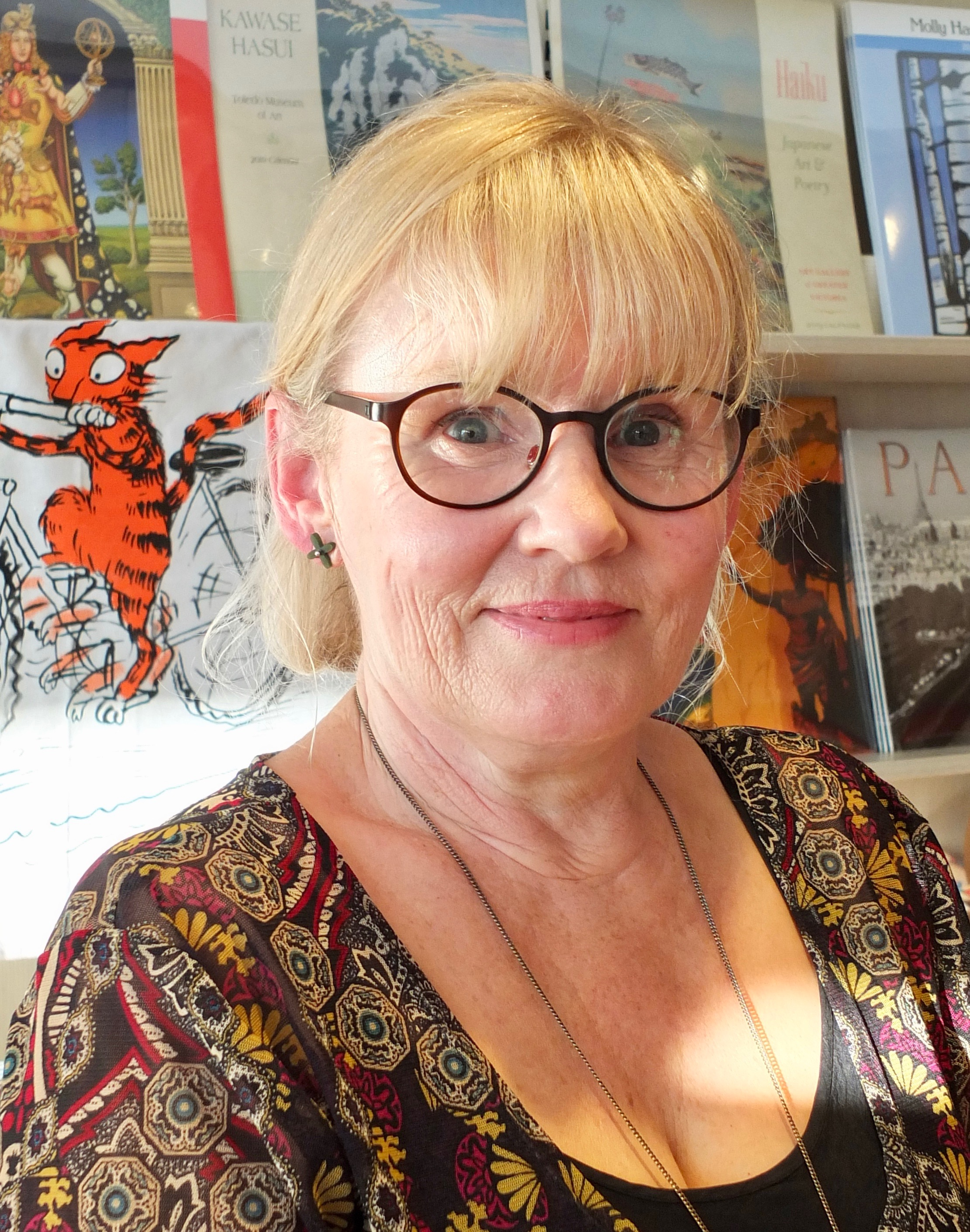
- Born: 1960 (age 65–66) Invercargill, New Zealand
- Areas: Cartoonist, Designer
- Notable works: Murdoch: the political cartoons of Sharon Murdoch
- Awards: "Cartoonist of the Year" Canon Media awards (2016, 2017) and Voyager Media awards (2018)

Sharon Murdoch is a cartoonist born in 1960 in Invercargill, New Zealand. She is the first woman to regularly produce political cartoons for New Zealand mainstream media, and draws the cartoon cat Munro who accompanies the daily crossword in Fairfax newspapers. Murdoch has won New Zealand Cartoonist of the Year three times: 2016, 2017 and 2018.

== Life ==
Of Ngāi Tahu and English descent, Sharon Murdoch was raised in a working-class family in Invercargill, which she described as "a bit like growing up in Iceland but without the epic poems". Her father persuaded her school to admit her to all-male Technical Drawing classes, for which she won the school prize.

Murdoch studied graphic design at Wellington Polytechnic School of Design, and worked as a graphic designer for Wellington City Art Gallery, for the Legal Resources Trust, and with activist design group the Wellington Media Collective as its only female graphic designer. In 1999/2000 she did Volunteer Service Abroad in the township of Indinsane, South Africa, working with a Xhosa women’s community development group co-drawing comics on HIV/AIDS prevention and early childhood education. She continues to work as a designer and illustrator.

Murdoch lives in Wellington and is married with a daughter, stepdaughter, two cats (la Luna and Munro), and a dog (Iris). Munro, named after a dog in a book by American author T.R. Pearson, is this inspiration for her daily newspaper cartoon of the same name.

== Career ==
Murdoch began cartooning full-time in her early 50s, after being encouraged by former partner Trace Hodgson, a political cartoonist for the New Zealand Listener. Her first cartoons were of Munro the cat, appearing daily alongside the crossword in the Dominion Post, which continues to run in Fairfax newspapers; each one incorporates a clue from that day's crossword. She then began doing "political illustration" for the columnist Tracy Watkins; her first proper political cartoon appeared in the Waikato Times in August 2013. Her political work is published in the Sunday Star Times, where she was appointed political cartoonist in December 2014, the Christchurch Press, and occasionally the Dominion Post or the Waikato Times: usually cartoons but sometimes illustrations in collaboration with others, such as the feature Growing Up Kiwi: Sophie's Story.

Murdoch is the first woman to produce regular cartoons for a New Zealand newspaper. She signs her work "Murdoch", initially concerned that her work would be read differently if people knew she was female. "As a woman cartooning, I will inevitably see things differently to a man." The issues of most importance to her personally are social justice, animal welfare, and the environment. Her favourite politician to draw is Judith Collins: "She's so fantastic – what would we do without her?"

In 2016, a 200 page book on Murdoch's work was published, which topped Unity Books' bestseller list

== Social justice ==
Murdoch has a strong theme of social justice throughout her work. Her final-year thesis at Wellington Polytechnic School of Design was graphical material such as logos and posters for Wellington Rape Crisis Centre.

Another example is the Take The TVZZ Kiwi-Meter Quiz! cartoon from Christchurch's The Press, in which a Māori woman is depicted abused and covered in bandages of the various 'special treatments' Māori experience in New Zealand, such as lower educational outcomes and substandard housing. Murdoch has said that she feels caring is part of her job as a cartoonist, and that 'underneath I'm really angry about a lot of the things I'm drawing about'.

== Awards and honours ==
Murdoch was nominated for "Cartoonist of the Year" in the 2014 and 2015 Canon Media Awards, and won in 2016 and 2017, the first woman to receive this award. The awards were renamed the Voyager Media Awards, and Murdoch won again in 2018. Judges applauded her "fresh style and satirical intelligence" and described her as "gleeful and ingenious, and very funny, but she can shock us too"; one commented, "Sharon Murdoch's political cartoons satisfy the two golden rules of the art form. They make you laugh and are wickedly caricatured." Her cartoon The Alphabet for Needy Children was described as a "powerful comment on homelessness".

In 2017 Murdoch was inducted into the Massey University's College of Creative Arts' Hall of Fame.

== Bibliography ==
- Murdoch: The Political Cartoons of Sharon Murdoch (2016). Commentary by Melinda Johnston.
- Three Words: An Anthology of Aotearoa/NZ Women's Comics (2016). Contributor.
- Digital Cartoons and Sharon Murdoch (2017) by Valerie Love.
- Munro: a cat, a mouse, a crossword clue (2018)
