= Duncan Greive =

New Zealand magazine editor

- Born: 1979 (age 46–47); Auckland, New Zealand
- Organization: The Spinoff
- Spouse: Nicola Greive
- Children: 3

Duncan Greive (born 1979) is the founder and managing editor of The Spinoff, a subscriber- and sponsor-funded online magazine based in Auckland, New Zealand.

== Life and career ==
Greive was born in Auckland in 1979, then spent the first 10 years of his life in South London. His English mother worked as a social worker, and his New Zealand-born father initially had trouble getting work, until he got a job at the Top Deck bus tour company. After a Top Deck owner founded the Flight Centre travel agency, Greive's family returned to New Zealand in 1990, where his father was managing director of Flight Centre in New Zealand. His parents later became major shareholders in the Barkers fashion label. Greive attended Auckland Grammar and the University of Auckland, where he studied history.

Greive left university at 21 before graduating to take up a job as a postie, as he was about to become a father. He went on to finish his history degree part-time. While delivering mail he found work as a reviewer for the Auckland music magazine Real Groove. When editor John Russell resigned in 2004, Greive was turned down as his replacement, as he did not have a journalism qualification. So he enrolled in the Auckland University of Technology postgraduate journalism course. Three months after graduating he became the Real Groove editor.

By 2009, Greive was working in marketing for Barkers, and working as a freelance journalist. Since 2012 he has written for New Zealand Geographic, Metro, North & South, The Guardian, Pantograph Punch, The Listener, Faster Louder and Sky Sport Magazine, the New Zealand Herald, Stuff, Newshub and Radio New Zealand. In 2015 he co-wrote Dan Carter: My Story with former All Black Dan Carter. The autobiography, published by Auckland publisher Upstart Press, was the biggest-selling book in New Zealand in 2015 and won Best Autobiography in the 2016 Sportel Awards.

== The Spinoff ==
In 2014 Greive launched The Spinoff, an online news site publishing breaking news, politics, pop culture, reviews and social issues across a range of platforms. The business is owned by Grieve and his wife Nicola, a lawyer at the Serious Fraud Office. It operates as a website and a copywriting agency; Spinoff staff writers are funded by donations and commercial sponsors. The site began as a blog about TV shows sponsored by streaming platform Lightbox. The Spinoff also publishes daily newsletters and podcasts.

"The Spinoff was a combination of an accident and an experiment," Greive told the University of Auckland in a 2017 series on alumni titled 40 under 40: Influencers. "The traditional funding model for journalism is fundamentally broken and I wanted to see if I could create a new model that allowed me to grow a business that’s a combination of a media company and a creative agency."

== Publications ==
- Carter, Dan (2015). Dan Carter: My Story. with Duncan Greive. Sydney: Upstart Press. ISBN 978-1-4607-5147-3. OCLC 931025745.
