= The Nelson Mail =

New Zealand newspaper

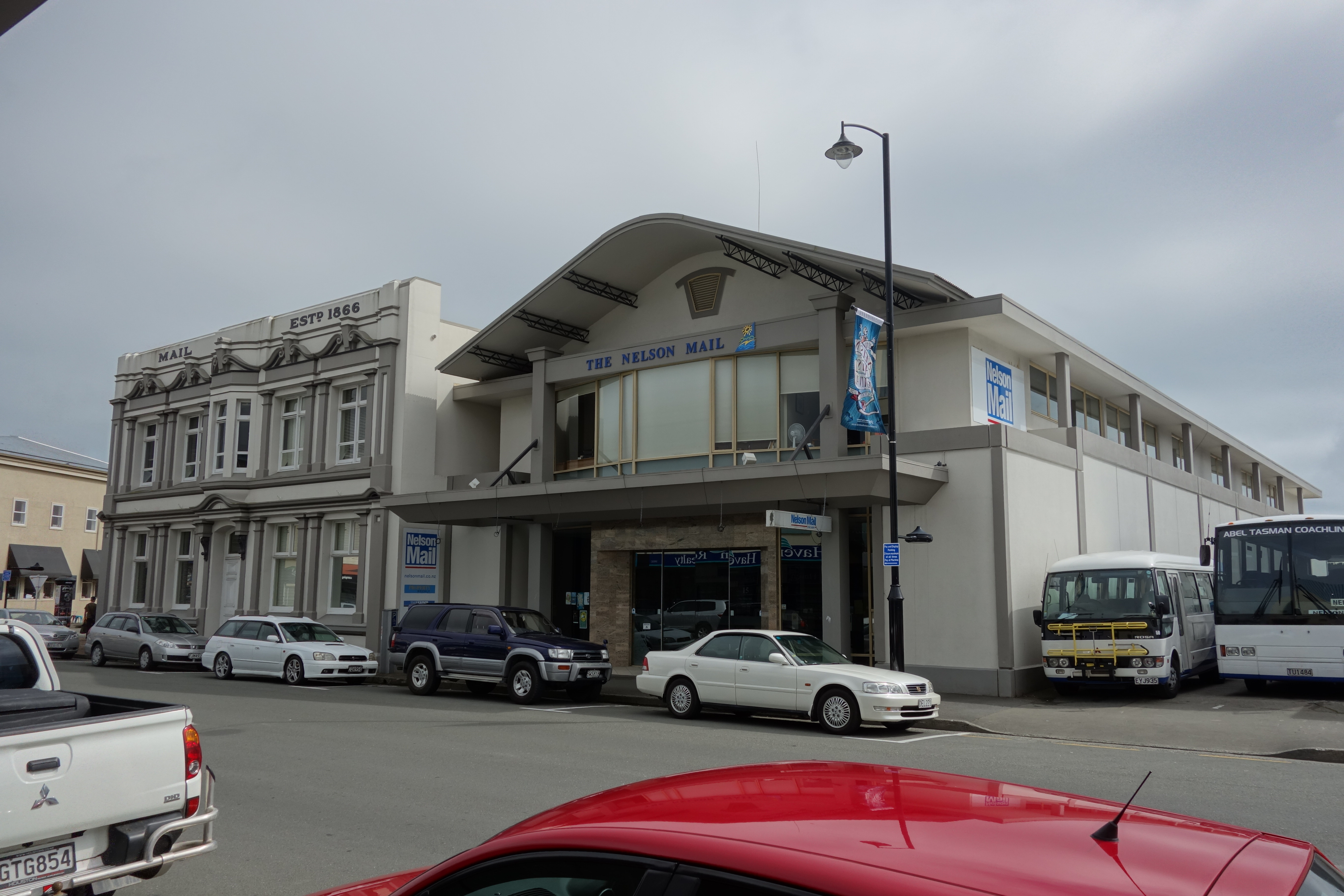
- The old and the new building of The Nelson Mail
- Type: 4 days a week (Monday Wednesday Friday and Saturday) newspaper
- Format: Tabloid (Monday, Wednesday and Friday) Broadsheet (Saturday)
- Owner: Stuff Ltd
- Editor: Victoria Guild
- Founded: 5 March 1866
- Headquarters: Nelson, New Zealand
- Website: The Nelson Mail

The Nelson Mail is a 4-day a week newspaper in Nelson, New Zealand, owned by media business Stuff Ltd. It was founded in 1866 as The Nelson Evening Mail.

== History ==
The first edition of The Nelson Evening Mail was published on 5 March 1866. The owner was the printer Robert Lucas. Two paper existed already in Nelson at that time: The Nelson Examiner (founded in 1842) and The Colonist (founded in 1857). With the new newspaper immediately making an impact, the older newspapers became dailies, but that could not stop their slow decline. The last edition of The Nelson Examiner was issued on 15 January 1874, and The Colonist was bought by The Nelson Evening Mail in 1920 and its last edition was published on 1 May of that year.

The Lucas family sold the newspaper to Independent Newspapers (INL) in 1993. The new owners changed the title of the newspaper to The Nelson Mail in 1995 when it became a morning newspaper. From 31 July 2017, the publishing schedule was cut back to Monday, Wednesday, Friday, and Saturday. As of 2025, the Saturday newspaper being published is Stuff's sister-publication The Press.

== Awards and nominations ==
In 2018, The Nelson Mail reporter Nina Hindmarsh won Best Junior Reporter at the 2018 Voyager Media Awards.

In 2019, The Nelson Mail photographer Braden Fastier was the joint winner of Photographer of the Year at the 2019 Voyager Media Awards. Fastier also won the Best Photography (News and/or Sport) Award at the same event.
Also in 2019, Fastier won the News Photography (Regional) Award and the News Photography (Sports) Award from News Media Works.
