= Newsroom (website) =

New Zealand media outlet

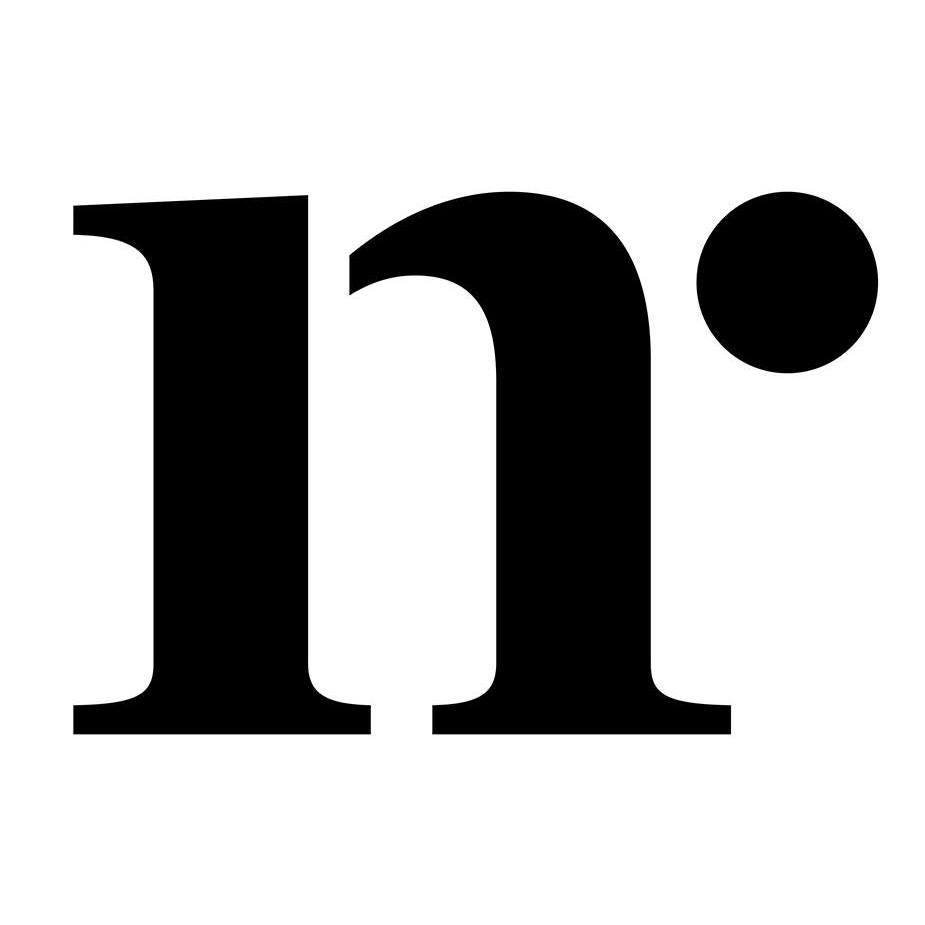
- Logo
- Website type: News website
- Available in: English
- Owner: Newsroom NZ Ltd
- Editors: Mark Jennings; Tim Murphy
- Website: www.newsroom.co.nz
- Commercial: Yes
- Launched: 13 March 2017; 9 years ago

Newsroom is a New Zealand online news publication that was founded by Tim Murphy and Mark Jennings in 2017 and is co-edited by them. It focuses on New Zealand politics, current affairs and social issues.

== History ==
=== Earlier namesake ===
The original website at newsroom.co.nz was launched by Peter Fowler on 21 November 1996 and was called NewsRoom. It aggregated breaking news and press releases. Fowler sold it to NZX in 2007, and they sold it to Craig Pellett's company Sublime (now called Streamline) in 2014. Pellett's company sold it to Newsroom NZ Ltd in 2017.

=== Current Newsroom ===
The current website launched on 13 March 2017, with a promise to cover "the things that matter" and the hope of being a "New Zealand version of The Guardian". Its initial funding came from four "foundation sponsors", including the University of Auckland and Victoria University of Wellington. The site launched with a group of 16 writers. The site was founded by Tim Murphy, the former editor in chief of the New Zealand Herald, and Mark Jennings, former head of news and current affairs at Newshub. As of 2021, Jennings Murphy Limited owned a 75% shareholding in Newsroom.

Newsroom launched with a scoop that accused an egg supplier of passing off caged eggs as free-range.

It broke two significant stories that influenced the 2017 New Zealand general election. On June 20, 2017, the site revealed the clandestine recording of a staff member working for the MP Todd Barclay, in an article titled "Politicians, police, and the payout". The article explored the extent of the police investigation and the involvement of then Prime Minister Bill English. Newsroom described the staff member involved as having been paid "hush money" from the Prime Minister's budget. Several days later, Barclay announced that he would not stand for re-election.

In collaboration with the Financial Times, Newsroom raised an issue with the background of Chinese National Party MP Jian Yang. The site reported that the Security Intelligence Service had scrutinized Yang and that in an interview with the Financial Times in 2011, Yang had confirmed that he attended two military institutions that Newsroom described as "elite Chinese spy schools". The Financial Times says one of the schools is part of China's military intelligence apparatus, training linguists to intercept foreign communications. Yang was a lecturer at the Foreign Language Institute and his immigration file shows he taught the English language and American studies. Yang claimed he taught his students to simply monitor communications, rather than carry out "the physical act of spying". He conceded he could be seen as having taught spies. The New Zealand Herald later reported that Yang did not disclose his links to the schools in his citizenship applications.

Newsroom partnered with the international survey firm SSI to conduct its first election poll, in 2017.

Newsroom won the Website of the Year award jointly with Stuff at the 2018 Voyager Media Awards.

=== Legal action ===
In September 2017, Sir Ray Avery brought claims against Newsroom under the Harmful Digital Communications Act regarding a series of articles that alleged Avery had tried to suppress clinical studies regarding his Acuset IV flow controller. Netsafe chose not to pursue the complaint after Newsroom refused to redact the articles.

In 2017, Winston Peters served legal documents against co-editor Tim Murphy and a Newshub journalist regarding the leaking of information regarding Peters' superannuation payments. Peters later dropped the legal action, with Murphy describing it as having been an attempt to intimidate the news media.

=== Reception and criticism ===
In April 2021, BusinessDesk reported on Newsroom’s shareholders and financial backers, among them Ecostore owner Peter Kraus, Xero founder Rod Drury and Trade Me founder Sam Morgan. It described the publisher as a "respected news publisher" known for its investigative reporting and editorial independence.

In March 2022, some other media outlets criticised a report by Newsroom journalist Melanie Reid for its uncritical and sympathetic coverage of anti-COVID vaccination group Voices for Freedom, one of the organisations behind the 2022 Wellington protest, contrasting it with reports on misinformation by other Newsroom journalists Marc Daalder and David Williams. Reid and Jennings then acknowledged that omitting challenges to Voices for Freedom over misinformation "may have been an error of judgment".

== Newsroom Pro ==
Newsroom Pro is an online subscription news service based in Wellington. It reports on parliament and the Beehive. Its editor is Jonathan Milne.

== See also ==
- Mass media in New Zealand
