= Jared Savage =

American basketball player (born 1997)

Personal information
- Born: March 2, 1997 (age 29)
- Listed height: 6 ft 5 in (1.96 m)
- Listed weight: 205 lb (93 kg)

Career information
- High school: Warren Central (Bowling Green, Kentucky)
- College: Austin Peay (2015–2017); Western Kentucky (2018–2020)
- NBA draft: 2020: undrafted
- Playing career: 2020–2022
- Position: Small forward / shooting guard

Career history
- 2020–2021: Lavrio
- 2021–2022: Crailsheim Merlins
- 2022: Lavrio
- 2022: Ontario Clippers

Career highlights
- Third-team All-Conference USA (2020); Conference USA All-Defensive Team (2020)

Jared Savage (born March 2, 1997) is an American former professional basketball player. He played college basketball for the Austin Peay Governors and the Western Kentucky Hilltoppers.

== Early life ==
Savage attended Warren Central High School, where he played six Region 4 Tournament games throughout his career. As a senior, he averaged 17.8 points and 8.9 rebounds per game, leading the Dragons to a 23–9 season before losing to Bowling Green High School 46–43 in the 4th region Championship. Savage, considered a two-star prospect by Verbal Commits and unranked by 247Sports, Rivals or ESPN, was not highly recruited. He ultimately signed with Austin Peay, his father's alma mater.

== College career ==
As a freshman, Savage averaged 6.4 points per game. He helped the Governors win the Ohio Valley Conference Tournament by making 19 3-pointers across four games. He posted 24 points, 9 rebounds, and 2 assists in the title game against UT Martin, earning All-Tournament Team recognition. Savage became a starter as a sophomore, averaging 10.3 points and 4.4 rebounds per game and made 57 three-pointers. He transferred to Western Kentucky after his sophomore season when Austin Peay coach Dave Loos retired, after considering Lipscomb. Savage averaged 12.2 points and 4.8 rebounds per game and had 14 blocked shots as a redshirt junior. During the beginning of his senior season, Savage served as a secondary scorer to Charles Bassey but emerged as a primary threat after Bassey's season-ending injury. He posted 24 points and 16 rebounds against UTSA on February 15, 2020. As a redshirt senior, Savage averaged 11.7 points and 7.1 rebounds per game. His college career came to an end when the COVID-19 pandemic caused the cancellation of the Conference USA Tournament. Savage was named to the Third Team All-Conference USA as well as the Defensive Team.

== Professional career ==
=== Lavrio (2020–2021) ===
On July 20, 2020, Savage signed his first professional contract with Lavrio of the Greek Basket League.

On July 15, 2021, he signed with the Crailsheim Merlins of the German Basketball Bundesliga (BBL). He averaged 5.3 points and 2.5 rebounds per game.

On March 6, 2022, Savage returned to Lavrio for the rest of the season. In 10 league games, he averaged 9.4 points and 5 rebounds, playing around 25 minutes per game.

=== Ontario Clippers (2022) ===
On October 24, 2022, Savage joined the Ontario Clippers training camp roster. On December 22, 2022, Savage was waived.

== Career statistics ==
Legend
GP	Games played	GS	Games started	MPG	Minutes per game
FG%	Field goal percentage	3P%	3-point field goal percentage	FT%	Free throw percentage
RPG	Rebounds per game	APG	Assists per game	SPG	Steals per game
BPG	Blocks per game	PPG	Points per game	**Bold**	Career high

=== College ===
Year	Team	GP	GS	MPG	FG%	3P%	FT%	RPG	APG	SPG	BPG	PPG
2015–16	Austin Peay	**36**	7	19.7	.421	**.397**	.806	3.0	.8	.7	.0	6.4
2016–17	Austin Peay	29	26	31.7	.413	.358	**.846**	4.4	1.2	**1.2**	.4	10.3
2017–18	Western Kentucky	Redshirt										
2018–19	Western Kentucky	34	**34**	**35.7**	.364	.360	.818	4.8	1.2	1.0	.4	**12.2**
2019–20	Western Kentucky	30	30	34.6	**.448**	.396	.836	**7.1**	**1.4**	**1.2**	**1.1**	11.7
Career		129	97	30.1	.406	.376	.826	4.7	1.1	1.0	.5	10.0

== Personal life ==
His father, Jermaine Savage, played basketball at Austin Peay in the 1990s and was a member of the 1996 NCAA tournament team.
