= Steve Braunias =

New Zealand journalist and writer

Steven Carl Braunias (born 20 June 1960) is a New Zealand author, columnist, journalist and editor. He is the author of 14 books.

== Early life and family ==
Braunias was born in New Zealand to an Austrian immigrant father and a New Zealand-born mother. He is the younger brother of artist Mark Braunias.

He grew up in Mount Maunganui reading Shoot magazine, Roy of the Rovers and Tiger and Scorcher comic books. These would come to influence his later columns through the comic characters' names. Braunias was educated at Mount Maunganui College, and then attended the Wellington Polytechnic (now Massey University) journalism course in 1980 but did not graduate.

== Career ==
Braunias has worked as editor of Capital Times, feature writer at Metro magazine, deputy editor of the New Zealand Listener and senior writer at The Sunday Star-Times. He was also staff writer at Metro magazine, and syndicated a weekly satirical diary to six Fairfax newspapers. For several years he collaborated with photographer Jane Ussher on a series of travel stories for North & South magazine.

Braunias was editor-in-residence at the Waikato Institute of Technology school of journalism in Hamilton for eight years, and is life president of the Hamilton Press Club.

He has written for satirical television series Eating Media Lunch and The Unauthorised History of New Zealand. The $35,000 Braunias received from the 2010 CLNZ Writers' Award enabled him to work on Civilisation: 20 Places at the Edge of the World, an affectionate travel book about 20 small towns published in November 2012 by Awa Press.

He currently works as a staff writer for the New Zealand Herald, and literary editor for the New Zealand current affairs website Newsroom. He is also the publisher of Luncheon Sausage Books. He has been books editor of the New Zealand Listener, and editor of The Spinoff review of books.

== Recognition ==
Braunias has won more than 40 national awards for writing, including the 2009 Buddle Findlay Sargeson Literary fellowship, the 2010 CLL Non-Fiction Award and the 2006 Qantas Fellowship – the supreme award – at the New Zealand Qantas Media Awards (Print). He is a three-time winner of the Cathay Pacific Travel Writer of the Year Award (2002, 2010, 2011). He has won writing fellowships to the University of Oxford (Reuters, 2001), and the University of Cambridge (Wolfson College, 2006); and won awards as a sports writer, crime writer, book reviewer, food writer, and humorist.

The New Zealand musician Shayne Carter described Braunias, his writing style and influences in his 2019 autobiography Dead People I Have Known: "He’s my favourite journalist in New Zealand. He’s into Brian Granville and Graham Greene, and when his columns first appeared he called people out in a way no other New Zealand journalist was doing at the time. He wrote about sitting around in the dole in old lady cafes, eating pastries and pink lamingtons and enjoying an honest pot of tea. Then he’d take out some bureaucrat for being such a loser."

== Non-fiction books ==
- Fool's Paradise (Random House, 2001) Winner of the 2002 New Zealand Society of Authors' E. H. McCormick Best First Book Award for Non-Fiction at the Montana New Zealand Book Awards
- How to Watch a Bird (Awa Press, 2007)
- Fish of the Week (Awa Press, 2008)
- Roosters I Have Known (Awa Press, 2009)
- Smoking in Antarctica (Awa Press, 2010)
- Civilisation: Twenty places on the Edge of the World (Awa Press, 2012) Winner of the best book of non-fiction at the 2013 New Zealand Post national book awards
- Madmen: Inside the weirdest election campaign ever (Luncheon Sausage Books, 2014)
- The Scene of the Crime (Harper Collins, 2015) Finalist in the 2017 Ngaio Marsh crime writing book awards
- The Shops (Luncheon Sausage Books, 2016) Finalist in the 2017 New Zealand photobook awards
- The man who ate Lincoln Road (Luncheon Sausage Books, 2017)
- (Editor) The Friday Poem (Luncheon Sausage Books, 2018)
- Missing Persons (HarperCollins, 2021)
- Cover Story: 100 beautiful, strange and frankly incredible NZ album covers (Oratia Media, 2021).
- The Survivors: Stories of Death and Desperation (HarperCollins, 2024)
- Polkinghorne: Inside the Trial of the Century (Allen & Unwin NZ, 2025)
