= Taranaki Daily News =

Newspaper in New Zealand

- Type: Daily newspaper
- Format: Tabloid
- Owner: Stuff Ltd
- Editor: Matt Rilkoff
- Founded: 1857
- Headquarters: New Plymouth
- Website: thepost.co.nz/taranaki

The Taranaki Daily News is a daily morning newspaper published in New Plymouth, New Zealand.

== History ==
The paper was founded as the Taranaki News on 14 May 1857, by friends of former Taranaki Province Superintendent Charles Brown. Brown was the first proprietor of the newspaper and he appointed his political supporter and former Taranaki Herald editor Richard Pheney as its editor. The paper, initially housed in a small wooden building on the east side of Brougham Street opposite the present library, became a strident critic of the Herald and the provincial government. The paper began publishing on Saturdays and in 1885 changed its name to the Taranaki Daily News when it began publishing daily.

The word "Taranaki" was dropped from the masthead about 1962 when the paper's ownership was merged with that of the Herald to become Taranaki Newspapers Ltd, and reinstated in 2004. As of December 2008, the circulation was 25,578. This has progressively increased, with the paper's physical circulation in the 12 months to June 2024 estimated at 44,000 people – part of an estimated total cross-platform audience of 118,000 people.

Taranaki Newspapers Ltd was bought by Independent Newspapers Ltd in 1989 and was then part of Fairfax Media. An electronic version of the paper is available on the Stuff website. The editions from 1900 to 1945 have been digitised by the National Library and are available via Papers Past.

TNL also published two free weekly newspapers in the Taranaki region: The North Taranaki Midweek (Wednesdays) and the South Taranaki Star (Thursdays). In June 2024, Stuff closed the North Taranaki Midweek, which had been Taranaki’s single biggest free community paper.

Now, the Taranaki Daily News is printed in Petone, Wellington and moved premises in New Plymouth, downsizing and selling its previous building. It is limited in what it publishes, with deadlines now earlier with the printing done out of the region.

Local sports reporters were made redundant from Stuff's provincial newspapers at the end of 2017 and now rely on contributors to carry local coverage.

=== Awards ===
In 2019, Taranaki Daily News journalist Andy Jackson won News Media Awards' Portrait, Feature or Lifestyle Photography (Regional Category) Award from News Media Works.

=== Reporters ===
Matt Rilkoff, editor

Glenn McLean, senior reporter (local government, politics, justice, sport)

Helen Harvey, senior reporter (health, features, human interest stories)

Catherine Groenestein, senior reporter (South Taranaki, energy, human interest stories)

Will Johnston, reporter (social issues, politics, sport, energy, emergency services)

Vanessa Laurie, photographer.
