= Donna Chisholm =

New Zealand investigative journalist

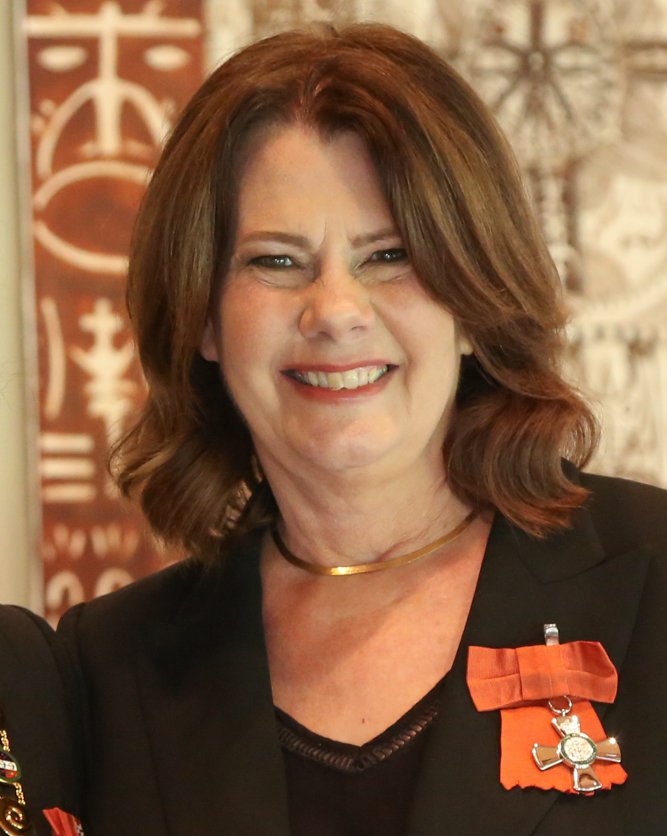
Chisholm in 2026

Donna Elise Chisholm MNZM (born 9 June 1957) is a New Zealand investigative journalist and author.

== Career ==
Chisholm was the first female chief reporter at the Auckland Star newspaper. Former New Zealand Listener editor Jenny Wheeler has called her the most "outstanding health reporter New Zealand's ever seen." She is best known for her campaign in the Sunday Star-Times to free David Dougherty from prison for a rape he did not commit. Dougherty was subsequently exonerated and awarded $868,728 in compensation. Chisholm's six-year investigation was dramatised in the 2009 Television New Zealand film Until Proven Innocent, and recounted in the 2017 book A Moral Truth: 150 years of investigative journalism in New Zealand by James Hollings.

Chisholm is the author of the book From the Heart, a biography of the New Zealand heart surgeon Brian Barratt-Boyes.

She lives in Auckland, and was formerly the editor-at-large for monthly current affairs magazine North & South, and senior writer for the weekly New Zealand Listener.

== Honours and awards ==
- 2000: New Zealand Qantas Media Awards Newspaper Feature Writer of the Year
- 2004: New Zealand Qantas Media Awards Newspaper Feature Writer of the Year
- 2011: Canon Media Awards Magazine Feature Writer of the Year: the Helen Paske Trophy
- 2016: Canon Media Awards Science and Technology Feature Writing award
- 2017: Outstanding achievement award at the 2017 Voyager Media Awards
- 2018: Voyager Media Awards Science and Technology Award, joint winner

In the 2026 New Year Honours, Chisholm was appointed a Member of the New Zealand Order of Merit, for services to journalism.
