= Toby Morris (cartoonist) =

New Zealand cartoonist

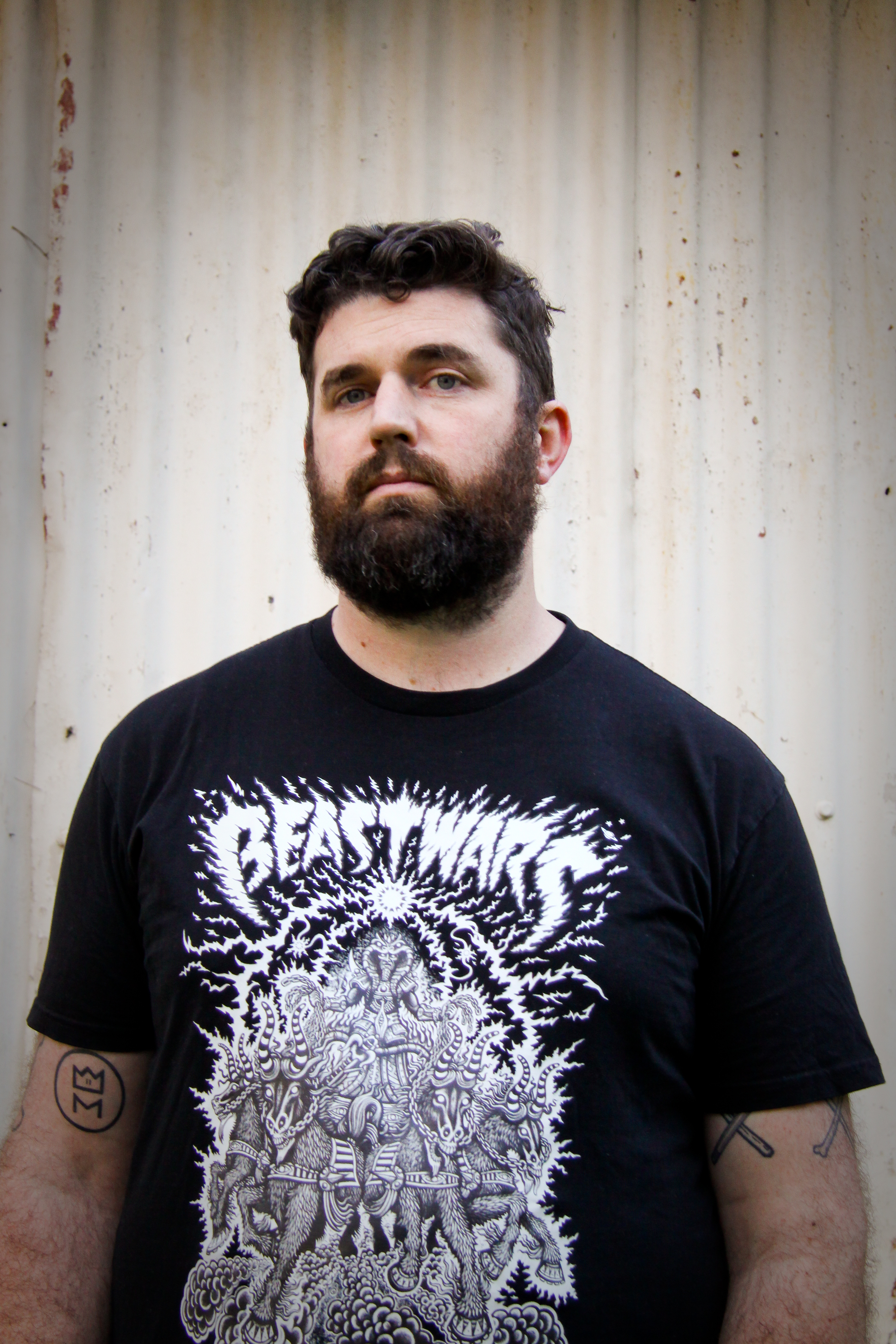
- Morris in 2015
- Born: 1980 (age 45–46) New Zealand
- Areas: Cartoonist, Illustrator
- Pseudonym: XTOTL
- Notable works: On A Plate, The Day The Costumes Stuck

Toby Morris (born 1980) is a New Zealand cartoonist, comics artist, illustrator and writer, best known for non-fiction online comics that often highlight social issues.

His work has reached worldwide audiences. On A Plate is an online comic Morris created to explain privilege by contrasting the lives from infancy to adulthood of two imaginary people: one wealthy, the other poor. It was shared globally and has been translated into several other languages. Animated graphics created in collaboration with Siouxsie Wiles for The Spinoff's coverage of the COVID-19 pandemic were similarly widely shared and translated. In 2022 Morris won the Prime Minister's Science Communication Prize.

== Life ==
Morris has attributed his love of comics to his family having moved frequently for his father's army career. He started making his own comics at the age of seven, during an extended break from school caused by a broken leg.

After unsuccessfully applying to study design at Massey University, Morris did a BA in English literature and political science at Victoria University of Wellington. During that time his comics were published in the magazine of Victoria University's students' association, Salient, and he worked for Salient in 2002.

During his early twenties, Morris played bass for Wellington band Batrider and moved to Melbourne with them. He later got hearing aids and was relieved to learn that his hearing loss was hereditary and not due to loud music. After leaving the band he relocated to Amsterdam with his wife, freelance photographer Sonya Nagels. They had their first child in Amsterdam and later returned to New Zealand.

Morris lives in Auckland with Nagels and their two sons.

== Work ==
Morris's comic On A Plate was part of his series of non-fiction comics The Pencilsword, published by Radio New Zealand (RNZ) on its website The Wireless.

Since moving on from RNZ, Morris has been creating non-fiction comics for online magazine The Spinoff, including a series titled The Side Eye. The Spinoff has also published a web series Two Sketches in which Morris interviews another illustrator while they each complete a drawing. Interviewees for Two Sketches included Sharon Murdoch and Metiria Turei.

He has published several books, including two collections of his cartoons depicting daily life: Alledaags: A Year in Amsterdam and Don't Puke On Your Dad: A Year In The Life of A New Father; and two children's books: Capsicum, Capsi Go and The Day The Costumes Stuck. The latter was nominated for the Russell Clark Award for Illustration in the 2017 NZ Book Awards.

Flatten the Curve: How simple public health measures save lives from Coronavirus disease 2019

Morris was the illustrator of a special edition of the School Journal focused on Te Tiriti O Waitangi, which was supplied to schools in 2018. A book version of the School Journal work was subsequently made available for purchase by the general public, and sold well. The latter was nominated for the Elsie Locke Award for Non-Fiction in the 2020 New Zealand Book Awards for Children and Young Adults, and also for the Scholastic New Zealand Award for Best Children’s Book in the Publishers Association of New Zealand Book Design Awards 2020.

Flatten the Curve, a slightly animated comic that Morris created in 2020 with Siouxsie Wiles for The Spinoff to describe how simple citizen actions could vastly reduce the death toll, went viral during the Coronavirus disease 2019 viral pandemic and was seen worldwide (including in Wikipedia). Called "the defining chart of the Coronavirus", it was based on earlier graphics by the Centers for Disease Control and Prevention, Rosamund Pearce of The Economist, and Thomas Jefferson University professor Drew Harris. The World Health Organization (WHO) hired The Spinoff to deliver content in support of the global effort to combat the pandemic, after WHO's communications director encountered some of the work Morris and Wiles had produced. Morris was creative director for the WHO contract, and went on to become the creative director of The Spinoff.

Siouxsie Wiles has credited Morris for his part in the work that contributed to her being named New Zealander of the Year for 2021.

== Awards ==
In May 2022 Morris was selected as the winner of the 2021 Prime Minister's Science Communication Prize. Morris's 2025 book Pūkeko Who-Keko? was nominated for the Bookhub Picture Book Award in the 2026 New Zealand Book Awards for Children and Young Adults.

=== Newspaper Publishers' Association awards ===
The New Zealand News Publishers' Association awards are given out annually under varying brand names and Morris has been a nominee or recipient since 2016.

==== Canon Media Awards ====
- 2016 – Opinion writer – general (with Toby Manhire), for RNZ Online
- 2017 – Best artwork/graphics, for RNZ and The Wireless

==== Voyager Media Awards ====
- 2018 (winner) – Best artwork/graphics (including interactive/motion graphics), for The Spinoff and The Wireless
- 2019 (winner) – Best artwork/graphics (including interactive/motion graphics), for The Spinoff
- 2020 (winner) – Cartoonist of the Year, for The Spinoff (also runner up for Best artwork/graphics)
- 2021 (winner) – Cartoonist of the Year and Best Artist/Graphic Design, both for The Spinoff
- 2022 (nominee) – Best artist/graphic design, for The Spinoff
- 2023 (nominee) – Best artist/graphic design, for The Spinoff
