= Matt Nippert =

New Zealand investigative journalist

- Born: Matthew Godfrey Nippert; 1979 (age 46–47)
- Education: Victoria University of Wellington; Columbia University Graduate School of Journalism
- Occupation: Journalist
- Employer: The New Zealand Herald
- Known for: Investigative journalism
- Notable work: 'Tax gap' series of articles (2016)

Matthew Godfrey Nippert (born 1979) is a New Zealand investigative journalist. His 2016 series of articles for the New Zealand Herald has been credited with helping to drive New Zealand tax reform.

== Education ==
Nippert grew up in the Hutt Valley. He has an honours degree in public policy from Victoria University of Wellington, where he was a contemporary of a future prime minister, Chris Hipkins – they served together on the executive of the Victoria University of Wellington Students' Association (VUWSA) in 1999.

After abandoning a journalism course at Auckland University of Technology, Nippert won a Fulbright Scholarship in 2005 and gained a Master of Science degree (graduating with honours) from Columbia School of Journalism.

In 2018, Nippert won a Press Fellowship to Wolfson College, Cambridge.

== Career ==
As a student, Nippert was deputy editor of Salient, the weekly student magazine published by VUWSA.

Nippert began his career writing general interest feature stories with a preference for the arts. From 2010, he began to focus on business and white-collar crime. He is a member of the International Consortium of Investigative Journalists.

Nippert joined The New Zealand Herald as an investigative reporter in 2014. He has also worked for the New Zealand Listener, the New Zealand Herald on Sunday, the National Business Review and the Sunday Star-Times.

== The 'tax gap' series ==
Nippert's series of New Zealand Herald articles in 2016 revealed that 20 high-profile firms earning revenue in New Zealand paid a surprisingly low level of tax. The series was credited in parliamentary speeches for igniting pressure for corporate tax reform and was excerpted in A Moral Truth: 150 Years of Investigative Journalism in New Zealand, edited by James Hollings. Hollings opined that "Nippert is helping cement the role of investigative journalism as a core part of New Zealand public life".

== Awards ==
- 2024: New Zealand Shareholders' Association Business Journalism Awards – Best Business News story.
- 2018: Voyager Media Awards – Wolfson Fellow and Business Journalist of the Year.
- 2017: Canon Media Awards – Reporter of the Year and Best Investigation.
- 2016: EY New Zealand Business Journalism Awards – Business News Writer of the Year.
- 2016: Canon Media Awards – Reporter of the Year; Business News Writer of the Year, Best Innovation in Storytelling.
- 2015: EY New Zealand Business Journalism Awards – Journalist of the Year; Canon Media Awards – Business Reporter of the Year.
- 2009: Qantas Media Awards – Magazine Feature Writer of the Year (Junior).
- 2003: Aotearoa Student Press Association Awards – News Writer of the Year; Feature Writer of the Year.
