= The Press =

New Zealand newspaper

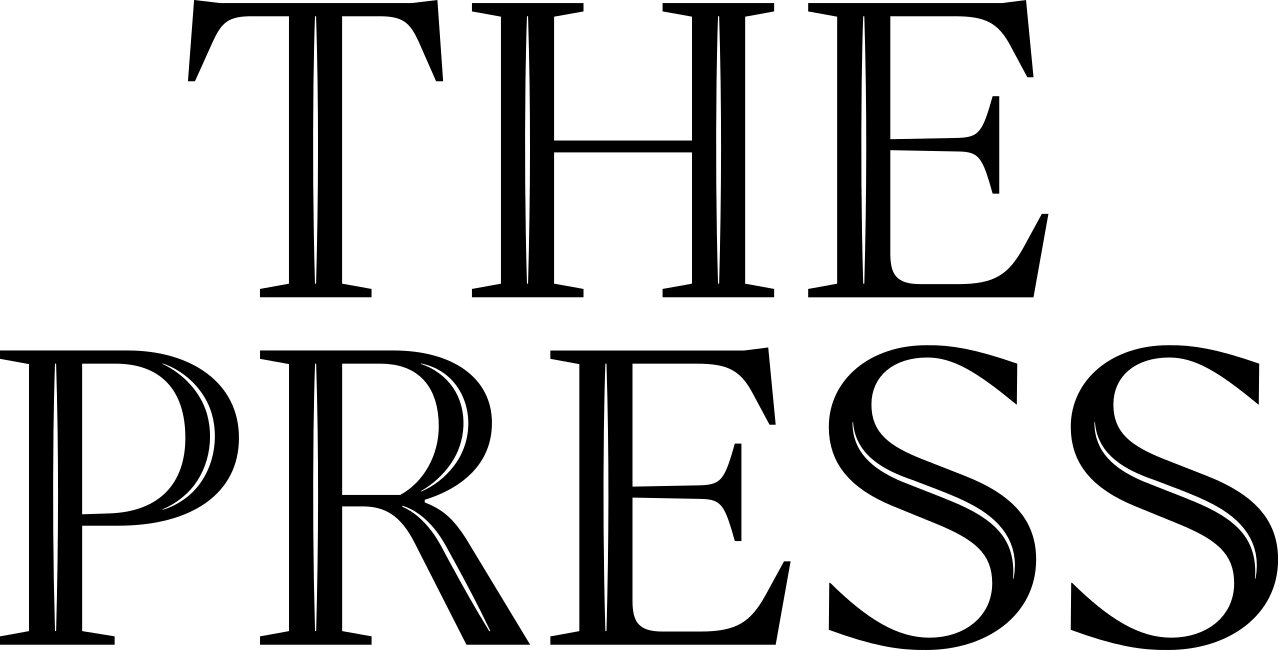

- The 14 July 2023 front page of; The Press
- Type: Daily newspaper
- Format: Compact (weekday); Broadsheet (Saturday)
- Owner: Stuff Ltd
- Editor: Kamala Hayman
- Founded: 25 May 1861
- Headquarters: Christchurch, New Zealand
- Circulation: 37,002 (as of 2019)
- ISSN: 0113-9762
- Website: thepress.co.nz

The Press (Māori: Te Matatiki, lit. 'The Source') is a daily newspaper published in Christchurch, New Zealand, owned by media business Stuff Ltd. First published in 1861, the newspaper is the largest circulating daily in the South Island and publishes Monday to Saturday. One community newspaper—Northern Outlook—is also published by The Press and is free.

The newspaper has won the title of New Zealand Newspaper of the Year (in its circulation category) three times: in 2006, 2007 and 2012. It has also won the overall Newspaper of the Year title twice: in 2006 and 2007.

== History ==
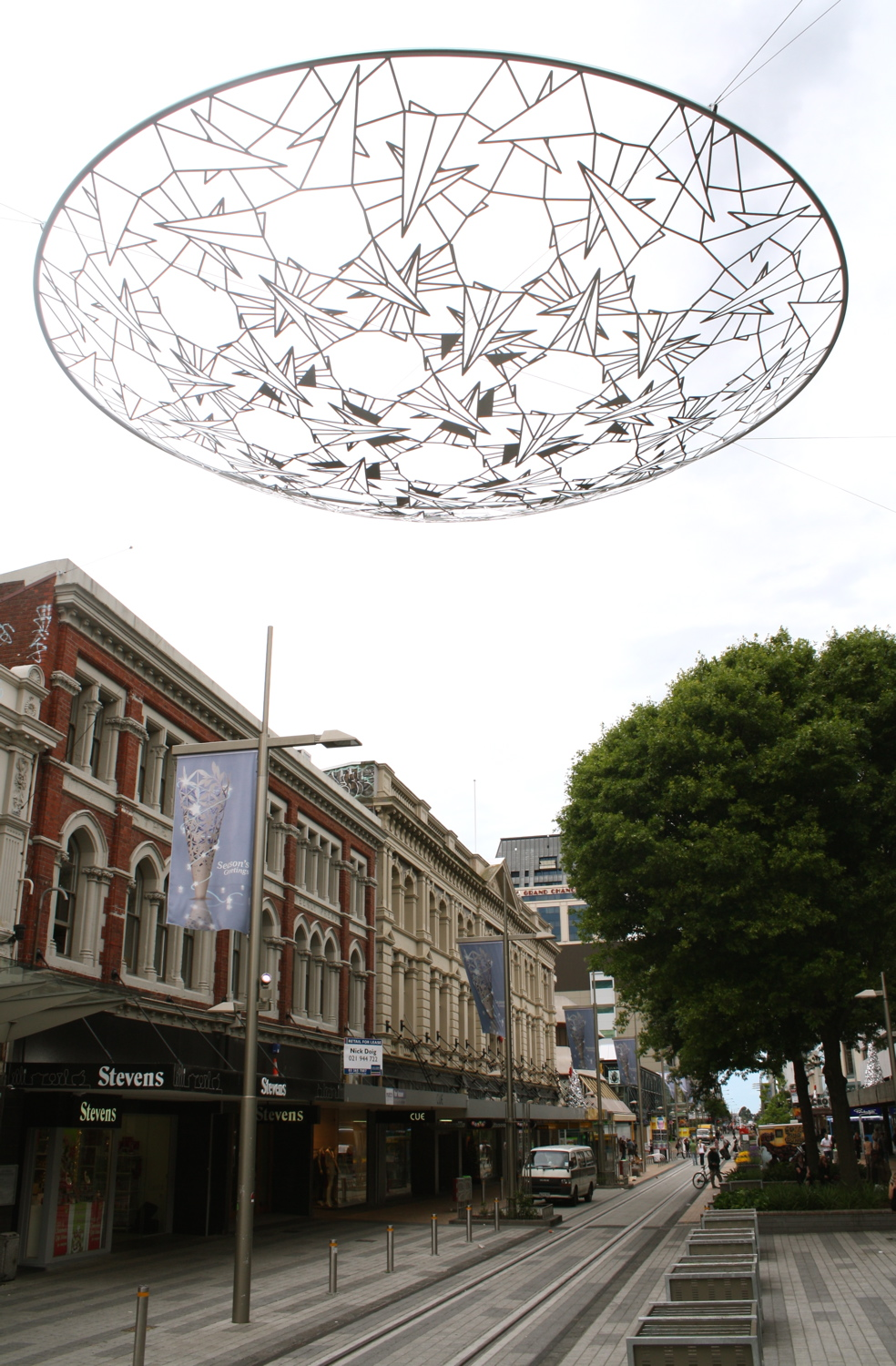
Former Press Building in Cashel Street, in use by the newspaper until 1908

=== Origins ===
James FitzGerald came to Lyttelton on the Charlotte Jane in December 1850, and was from January 1851 the first editor of the Lyttelton Times, Canterbury's first newspaper. From 1853, he focussed on politics and withdrew from the Lyttelton Times. After several years in England, he returned to Canterbury concerned about the proposed capital works programme of the provincial government, with his chief concern the proposed rail tunnel connecting Christchurch and Lyttelton, which he thought of as fiscally irresponsible, but supported by his old newspaper, the Lyttelton Times. The newspaper's editor, Crosbie Ward, made an imputation of unknown content, and this spurred FitzGerald to set up The Press as a rival newspaper.

FitzGerald had dinner with John Watts-Russell, who put up £500 on the condition that FitzGerald would be in charge of the new newspaper. Next, he enlisted the support of the Rev. John Raven, who organised many of the practical aspects, like organising a printer and a printing press. Other members of the early committee that organised The Press were Henry Porcher Lance (brother of James Dupré Lance), Henry Tancred, and Richard J. S. Harman; all of them were colonial gentry.

The Press was first published on 25 May 1861 from a small cottage, making it the oldest surviving newspaper in the South Island of New Zealand. The cottage belonged to Raven on land known as Raven's paddock on the west side of Montreal Street, between Worcester and Gloucester Streets, opposite the present-day Christchurch Art Gallery. The first edition was a six-page tabloid and was sold for sixpence. The paper continued as a weekly. The public saw FitzGerald as the proprietor of The Press, but the newspaper saw reason to publicly state that "it is not a fact that Mr FitzGerald has either pecuniary or official connexion" with it; he was however the driving force behind the paper.

=== Expansion ===
On 13 June 1863, the first part of Samuel Butler's Erewhon appeared in The Press in an article signed with the pseudonym Cellarius (q.v.) and headed "Darwin among the Machines."

In 1905, The Press purchased a block of the Cathedral Square site for £4,000. The Board then purchased the right of way (Press Lane) and what was going to be the original Theatre Royal site from the Theatre Royal Syndicate for £5000. The Gothic part of the Press building (occupied by the company until 22 February 2011) was built starting in 1907 and the Press staff shifted into it in February 1909 from their Cashel Street premises.

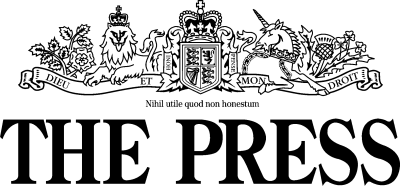
Old logo

In the 1930s, The Press began to seek solutions to the slow delivery times of the newspaper to the West Coast. Roads at the time were difficult, and the New Zealand Railways Department was unwilling to reschedule any of its ordinary passenger trains to operate at the early morning times desired by The Press as patronage would have been uneconomic, and freight trains did not provide a desirable measure of swiftness. Accordingly, The Press was willing to subsidise the construction and operation of two small Leyland diesel railbuses to carry the newspapers by rail at a desirable time. These little railbuses began service on 3 August 1936 and left Christchurch at 2:20 am, travelling down the Midland Line to reach Greymouth at 6:40 am and then continue along the Ross Branch as far as Hokitika, arriving just before 8:00 am. This provided substantially quicker delivery of the newspaper than was previously possible. However, these railbuses were intended to only be a temporary measure and they were replaced by the much larger Vulcan railcars as soon as they arrived in New Zealand in the early 1940s.

=== Into the 21st century ===
Cover on 16 March 2008

In 1995, The Press was the country's first news outlet that established a website for news. In 2000, Independent Newspapers Ltd (INL) launched its news website branded as Stuff and from then on, The Press and Stuff worked on online content collaboratively.

In February 2011, The Press main building in central Christchurch was badly damaged in the 2011 Christchurch earthquake. All production was operated from their printing plant near Christchurch Airport until June 2012, when the central Christchurch building was partially rebuilt and upgraded. It was one of the first buildings in the Christchurch CBD to be rebuilt and operational.

The paper format for the weekday editions changed from broadsheet to compact in 2018, with only the Saturday edition retaining the larger format.

On 27 April 2023, it was announced that the newspaper would launch a new website that would new be subscription based, this would also happen to other Stuff Inc. owned newspapers The Post and Waikato Times. On 29 April, the new website was launched which also featured a new logo for the newspaper and all content now paywalled.

=== Motto ===
The old motto on the masthead – "Nihil utile quod non-honestum" translates to "Nothing is useful that is not honest." Like The Age in Australia, the newspaper's masthead featured the Royal Arms.

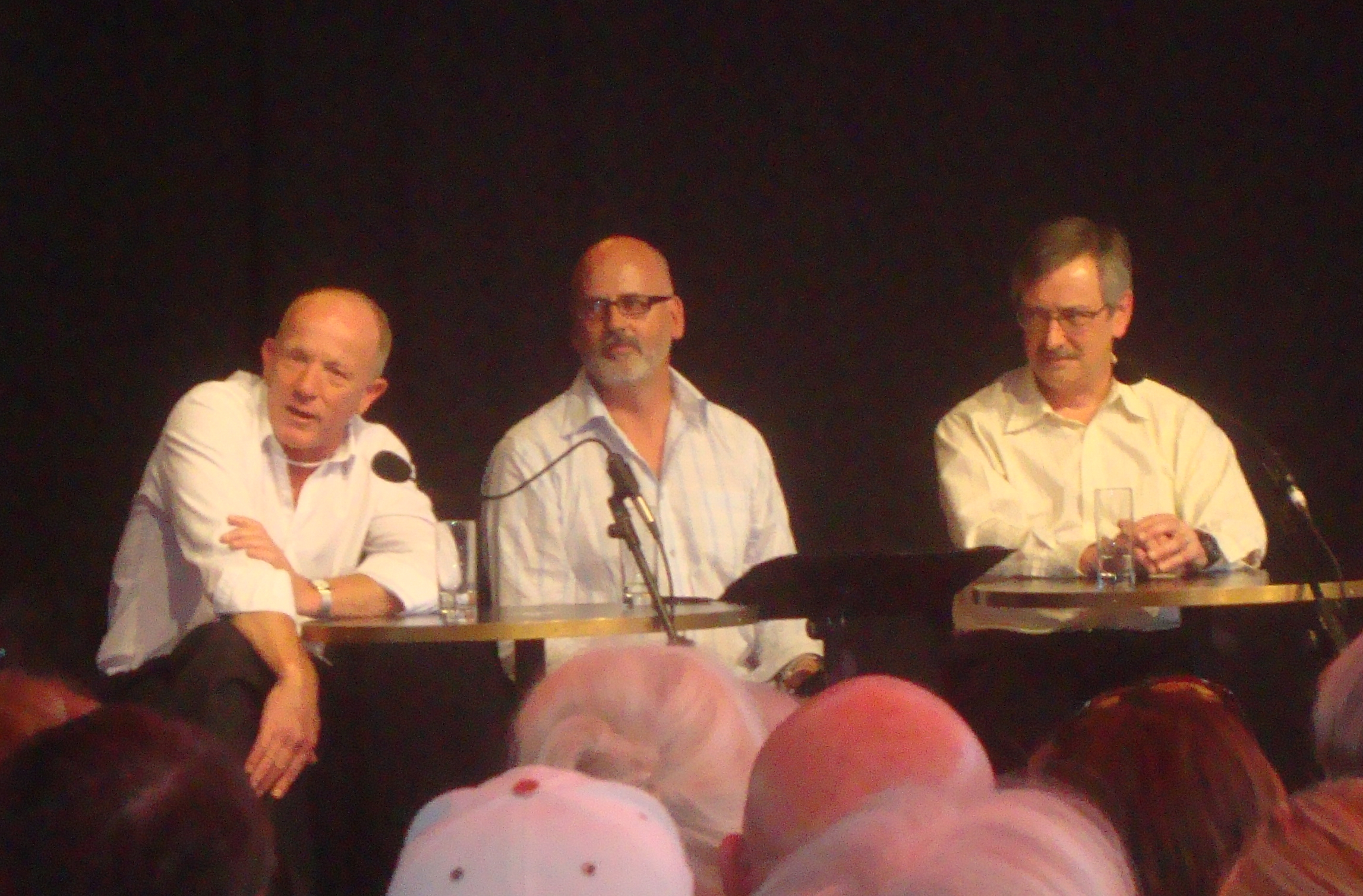
Joe Bennett (left), Andrew Holden (former editor of The Press), and Rod Oram

== Ownership ==
The early ownership, beyond the newspaper having been financed by Watts-Russell, is unclear. In February 1862, an attempt was made to form a company and formalise the ownership of the paper. A deed of association for "The Proprietors of The Press" was drafted, and it lists the five members of the previous committee (Watts-Russell, Raven, Lance, Tancred, and Harman), plus five new members: Alfred Richard Creyke, John Hall, Joseph Brittan, Isaac Cookson, and James Somerville Turnbull. The deed was not executed, but four-month later, FitzGerald, who had no funds, was the sole owner "through the liberality of the proprietors", as he called it later. FitzGerald lost control of the newspaper ownership in 1868 and the Press Company was incorporated as the owner. That company was dissolved in 1890 and George Stead bought the assets. Stead established the Christchurch Press Company and became its chairman.

The Christchurch Press Company was sold to Independent Newspapers Ltd in 1987, and INL in turn was bought by Fairfax New Zealand in 2003. The Australian parent company, Fairfax Media, merged with Nine Entertainment Co. in December 2018.

== Editors ==
The following have been editors of The Press:

Name	Portrait	Term of office	
George Sale		1861	
Joseph Colborne-Veel		1861	1868
Charles Purnell		1868	
Joseph Colborne-Veel		1868	1878
John Steele Guthrie		1878	1894
Michael Cormac Keane		1894	1919
William Triggs		1919	1929
Oliver Duff		1929	1932
Pierce Hugo Napier Freeth		1932	1957
Arthur Rolleston Cant		1957	1973
Norman Macbeth		1973	1978
Binney Lock		1978	1990
David Wilson		1990	1997
Bruce Baskett		1997	
Tim Pankhurst		1997	2001
Paul Thompson		2001	2007
Andrew Holden		2007	2012
Joanna Norris		2012	2017
Kamala Hayman		2017	present

Guy Scholefield was associate editor in 1903 and 1904.

== Awards and nominations ==
Year	Award	Category	Result
2023	Voyager Media Awards	Weekly newspaper of the year (The Weekend Press)	Winner
2023	Voyager Media Awards	Voyager newspaper of the year (The Weekend Press)	Finalist
2021	Voyager Media Awards	Metropolitan Newspaper of the Year	Winner
2021	Voyager Media Awards	Voyager newspaper of the year (The Weekend Press)	Winner
2021	Voyager Media Awards	Weekly newspaper of the year (The Weekend Press)	Winner
2021	Voyager Media Awards	Best newspaper front page	Winner
2020	Voyager Media Awards	Best newspaper front page	Winner
2020	Voyager Media Awards	Newspaper of the Year (more than 30,000 circulation)	Finalist
2019	Voyager Media Awards	Newspaper of the Year (more than 30,000 circulation)	Runner-up
2018	Voyager Media Awards	Best coverage of a major news event	Runner-up
2017	Voyager Media Awards	Best newspaper-inserted magazine	Joint winner
2017	Voyager Media Awards	Best coverage of a major news event	Joint winner
2013	Voyager Media Awards	Best Innovation in Multimedia Storytelling	Winner
2013	Voyager Media Awards	Best Digital Community Interaction	Winner
2012	Voyager Media Awards	Newspaper of the Year (over 30,000 circulation)	Winner
2012	Voyager Media Awards	Best Newspaper Design	Winner
2011	Canon Media Awards	Best Design	Winner
2011	Pacific Area Newspaper Publishers' Association:	Newspaper of the Year (circulation between 25,000 and 90,000)	Winner
2007	Qantas Media Print Awards	Newspaper of the Year	Winner
2007	Qantas Media Print Awards	Daily Newspaper over 25,000 circulation	Winner
2007	Qantas Media Print Awards	Newspaper Specialist Page or Section: Arts Section	Winner
2007	Qantas Media Print Awards	Newspaper Specialist Page or Section: Food & Nutrition Section	Winner
2006	Qantas Media Print Awards	Best New Zealand Newspaper	Winner
2006	Qantas Media Print Awards	Best Newspaper with a circulation over 25,000	Winner
2006	Qantas Media Print Awards	Best Newspaper Investigation	Winner
2006	Qantas Media Print Awards	Newspaper Specialist Page or Section: Food & Nutrition Section	Winner
2006	Qantas Media Print Awards	Newspaper Specialist Page or Section: Motoring Section	Winner
2006	Qantas Media Print Awards	Newspaper Specialist Page or Section: Other Section: How the Press Works	Winner

=== Awards and nominations for journalists employed by The Press ===
Year	Award	Category	Journalist	Result
2023	Voyager Media Awards	Best photography – news	Chris Skelton	Winner
2023	Voyager Media Awards	Best reporting – general	Nadine Porter	Finalist
2023	Voyager Media Awards	Best reporting – local government	Tina Law	Finalist
2021	Voyager Media Awards	Best reporting – crime and justice	Blair Ensor	Finalist
2021	Voyager Media Awards	Best reporting – social issues, including health and education	Vicki Anderson	Finalist
2021	Voyager Media Awards	Student Journalist of the Year	Steven Walton	Finalist
2020	Voyager Media Awards	Best photography – news	George Heard	Winner
2020	Voyager Media Awards	Best photography – news	Mark Baker	Finalist
2020	Voyager Media Awards	Judges' prize for the single best news photo	Stacy Squires	Winner
2020	Voyager Media Awards	Best reporting – crime and justice	Blair Ensor	Winner
2020	Voyager Media Awards	Regional Journalist of the Year	Hamish McNeilly	Winner
2019	Voyager Media Awards	Regional Journalist of the Year	Hamish McNeilly	Winner
2018	Voyager Media Awards	Cartoonist of the Year	Sharon Murdoch	Winner
2018	Voyager Media Awards	Best photography – news	Joseph Johnson	Winner
2018	Voyager Media Awards	Best photography – portrait	Chris Skelton	Winner
2018	Voyager Media Awards	Best news video	George Heard	Winner
2018	Voyager Media Awards	Best feature/photographic essay	Joseph Johnson	Runner-up
2018	Voyager Media Awards	Reporter – crime, justice and/or social issues	Martin van Beynen	Runner-up
2017	Voyager Media Awards	Cartoonist of the Year	Sharon Murdoch	Winner
2017	Voyager Media Awards	Arts and Entertainment Reporter of the Year	Vicki Anderson	Winner
2017	Voyager Media Awards	Best Short-form Feature Writer – Arts and Entertainment	Charlie Gates	Winner
2016	Voyager Media Awards	Videographer of the Year	Iain McGregor	Winner
2016	Voyager Media Awards	Junior Feature Writer of the Year	Tess McClure	Winner
2016	Voyager Media Awards	Cartoonist of the Year	Sharon Murdoch	Winner
2015	Voyager Media Awards	Best Environmental Photography	Kirk Hargreaves	Winner
2015	Voyager Media Awards	Newspaper Feature Writer of the Year	Charles Anderson	Winner
2015	Voyager Media Awards	Newspaper Feature Writer General	Charles Anderson	Winner
2013	Voyager Media Awards:	Best Sports Picture	Iain McGregor	Winner
2012	Voyager Media Awards	Editorial Writer of the Year	Bruce Rennie	Winner
2012	Voyager Media Awards	Senior Newspaper Feature Writer of the Year	Martin van Beynen	Winner
2012	Voyager Media Awards	Senior Reporter of the Year	Martin van Beynen	Winner
2012	Voyager Media Awards	Junior Reporter of the Year	Olivia Carville	Winner
2012	Voyager Media Awards	Arts and Entertainment Reporter of the Year	Vicki Anderson	Winner
2012	Voyager Media Awards	Best Video	Daniel Tobin	Winner
2004	Qantas Media Awards	Senior Reporter of the Year	Yvonne Martin	Winner
2004	Qantas Media Awards	Best single breaking news picture	David Hallett	Winner
2004	Qantas Media Awards	Best Editorial Graphic Artist	Graphics team	Winner
2004	Qantas Media Awards	Best Feature Writer (Environment and Conservation)	Kamala Hayman	Winner
2004	Qantas Media Awards	Best Feature Writer (Junior)	Anna Claridge	Winner
2004	Qantas Media Awards	Best Feature Writer (Crime and Justice)	Matt Conway	Winner
2004	Qantas Media Awards	Best Feature Writer (Food and Nutrition)	Kate Fraser	Winner
2004	Qantas Media Awards	Best Feature Writer (Human Relations)	Yvonne Martin	Winner
2004	Qantas Media Awards	Best Feature Writer (Social issues)	Dave Courtney	Winner
2004	Qantas Media Awards	Best Columnist (Sport and Racing)	Tony Smith	Winner
2000	Qantas Media Awards	Best Feature Writer (Human Relations)	Cate Brett	Winner
2000	Qantas Media Awards	Best Feature Writer (Environment and Conservation)	Tim Pankhurst	Winner
2000	Qantas Media Awards	Best Columnist (Overall)	Joe Bennett	Winner
2000	Qantas Media Awards	Best Columnist (Humour)	David McPhail	Winner
