= Waikato Times =

Daily newspaper in New Zealand

Coordinates: 37°45′21.02″S 175°14′4.62″E

- Type: Daily newspaper
- Owner: Stuff Ltd
- Editor: Jonathan MacKenzie
- Founded: 2 May 1872, Ngāruawāhia
- Language: New Zealand English
- Price: NZ$0.90–1.70 (depending on day)
- Sister newspapers: Hamilton Press
- ISSN: 1170-0688
- Website: Official website

The Waikato Times is a daily newspaper published in Hamilton, New Zealand, and owned by media business Stuff Ltd. It has a circulation to the greater Waikato region and became a tabloid paper in 2018.

The newspaper has won the title of New Zealand Newspaper of the Year (in the category of up to 30,000 circulation) for two consecutive years: 2018 and 2019.

== History ==
The Waikato Times started out as the tri-weekly Waikato Times and Thames Valley Gazette, first published by George Jones on 2 May 1872 in Ngāruawāhia but moved to Hamilton in 1875. It was then managed by Messrs Langbridge, Silver, E. M. Edgecumbe, George Edgecumbe and J. S. Bond, who ran a book and stationery shop and changed the Times from tri-weekly to a penny daily in 1896, using Press Association news.

For 20 years it competed with the Waikato Argus, until the papers merged in 1915. The paper changed from afternoon to morning production from 5 September 2011, though had changed its Saturday issue in 2003.

The Times had an audited net daily circulation of 11,633 copies at March 2021.

As of December 2012 Allan Hawkey produces opinion cartoons for the newspaper.

Papers Past has 2 May 1872 to 31 December 1892 issues in a searchable form on-line. Hamilton reference library has microfilm copies of the Waikato Argus (29 Aug 1896 – 27 December 1902, 23 January 1903 – 30 April 1909, 1 June 1909 – 4 December 1914) and Waikato Times from 1872.

On 27 April 2023, Stuff confirmed that it would launch separate subscription-based websites for The Waikato Times and two of its other major newspapers, The Post and The Press. Previously, the newspaper had been hosted on the free Stuff news website.

=== Community newspapers ===
The Hamilton Press was a weekly newspaper, delivered on Wednesdays, in the city of Hamilton. It was one of many free weekly, or bi-weekly Neighbourly newspapers, which, since 2014, were printed by Stuff. They also include Cambridge Edition, Franklin County News, Matamata Chronicle, Piako Post (Morrinsville-Te Aroha area), South Waikato News and Taupō Times. The Waikato Local (Te Pūtahi) absorbed the Hamilton Press, Matamata Chronicle, Piako Post and South Waikato News from the end of June 2024. On Stuff websites the last Taupō Times was on 28 June 2024 (though Taupō & Tūrangi News is now published independently, following a buyout by its editor), Cambridge Edition and Waikato Local issues were last on their websites on 12 March 2025 and Franklin County News on 13 March 2025,

== Awards and nominations ==
Year	Award	Result
2019	Voyager Media Awards: Best newspaper with circulation of up to 30,000	Winner
2018	Voyager Media Awards: Best newspaper with circulation of up to 30,000	Winner
2014	Voyager Media Awards: Best Video	Joint winner with Stuff
2009	Qantas Media Awards: Best Website Breaking News Story	Joint finalist with Stuff

In 2017, Waikato Times journalist Aaron Leaman was the joint winner of the Senior nib Health Journalism Scholarship at the Voyager Media Awards. Leaman also won Regional Journalist of the Year at the same event.

In 2018, Waikato Times journalist Ruby Nyika won Student Journalist of the Year at the Voyager Media Awards. The same year, Donna-Lee Biddle was runner-up for the Regional Journalist of the Year Award, and won the award for Feature writing - crime, justice and / or social issues.

In 2019, Waikato Times columnist Max Christoffersen won the Opinion Writing (General) Award at the Voyager Media Awards. Christoffersen had died two months prior to the awards ceremony.
