= 2012 Canon Media Awards =

- Awarded for: Excellence in New Zealand journalism
- Sponsored by: Canon
- Date: 18 May 2012
- Location: Auckland
- Country: New Zealand
- Presented by: Newspaper Publishers' Association

The 2012 Canon Media Awards were the annual New Zealand Media Awards, recognising New Zealand print and online journalism. Organised by the News Publishers' Association and sponsored by Canon, the awards were presented in Auckland on 18 May 2012 with winners announced in 55 categories.

The Weekend Herald was named Canon Newspaper of the Year and also won Weekly Newspaper of the Year. The Press won nine awards, including Newspaper of the Year. Its reporter Martin van Beynen was named Senior Reporter of the Year and Senior Newspaper Feature Writer of the Year, receiving the Canon Reporter Cup and the Wolfson Fellowship to Cambridge University.

== Winners ==
All winners are from the NPA's published results.

=== Newspapers ===
Award	Winner
Canon Newspaper of the Year	Weekend Herald
Newspaper of the Year (over 30,000 circulation)	The Press
Newspaper of the Year (up to 30,000 circulation)	Bay of Plenty Times
Weekly Newspaper of the Year	Weekend Herald
Community Newspaper of the Year	The Star
Best Newspaper Design	The Press
Best Newspaper Inserted Magazine	Canvas (The New Zealand Herald)

=== Magazines ===
Award	Winner
Best Newsstand Magazine	New Zealand Listener
Best Trade/Professional Magazine	Landscape Architecture NZ
Best Magazine Design	Good

=== Digital ===
Award	Winner
Best Online News Site	nzherald.co.nz
Best Website Community Interaction	nzherald.co.nz
Best Breaking News Coverage	stuff.co.nz / thepress.co.nz
Best Innovation in Multimedia Storytelling	NZH Election 2011 (The New Zealand Herald)
Best Innovation in New Technologies	Stuff app
Best Video	Daniel Tobin

=== Photography ===
Award	Winner
Press Photographer of the Year – Senior	Alan Gibson
Press Photographer of the Year – Junior	Benjamin Curran
Best Single News Picture	Geoff Sloan
Best Sports Picture	Simon Watts
Best Photo Essay	Geoff Sloan

=== Reporting ===
Award	Winner
Senior Reporter of the Year (Canon Reporter Cup)	Martin van Beynen (The Press)
Junior Reporter of the Year	Olivia Carville (The Press)
Best Investigation	Jon Stephenson
Reporter Politics	Vernon Small
Reporter Business	David Fisher
Reporter Crime and Justice	Clio Francis
Reporter Science and Environment	Marty Sharpe
Reporter Human Relations	Imogen Neale
Reporter Arts and Entertainment	Vicki Anderson
Reporter Sport	Simon Plumb

=== Feature writing ===
Award	Winner
Senior Newspaper Feature Writer of the Year	Martin van Beynen (The Press)
Junior Newspaper Feature Writer of the Year	Alex Fensome
Newspaper Feature Writer Politics	Claire Trevett
Newspaper Feature Writer Business	Karyn Scherer
Newspaper Feature Writer Crime and Justice	Steve Kilgallon
Newspaper Feature Writer Science and Environment	Chris Barton
Newspaper Feature Writer Human Relations	Tony Wall
Newspaper Feature Writer Arts and Entertainment	Adam Dudding
Newspaper Feature Writer Sport	Ben Stanley
Magazine Feature Writer of the Year	Kennedy Warne (New Zealand Geographic)
Magazine Feature Writer Politics	Jonathan Milne
Magazine Feature Writer Business	Donna Chisholm
Magazine Feature Writer Crime and Justice	Joanna Wane
Magazine Feature Writer Science and Environment	Kennedy Warne
Magazine Feature Writer Human Relations	Donna Chisholm
Magazine Feature Writer Arts and Entertainment	Diana Wichtel
Magazine Feature Writer Sport	Scotty Stevenson

=== Opinion, design and other awards ===
Award	Winner
Best Columnist	Simon Cunliffe
Editorial Writer of the Year	Bruce Rennie
Cartoonist of the Year	Guy Body
Reviewer of the Year	Russell Baillie
Best Artwork	Richard Dale
Best Headline	Nicholas Sorensen
Student Journalism Award	Jonathan Carson
Wolfson Fellowship	Martin van Beynen (The Press)

== Outstanding Achievement Award ==
An Outstanding Achievement Award was presented to Ian Grant, founder of the New Zealand Cartoon Archive.
