= 2013 Canon Media Awards =

- Awarded for: Excellence in New Zealand print and online media.
- Sponsored by: Canon New Zealand
- Date: 10 May 2013
- Location: Pullman Hotel, Auckland
- Country: New Zealand
- Hosted by: Newspaper Publishers' Association
- Website: canonmediaawards.co.nz

The 2013 Canon Media Awards were presented on Friday 10 May 2013 at the Pullman Hotel in Auckland, New Zealand. Awards were made in the categories of photography, online, magazines, newspapers, and general. Organisers received more than 1400 entries. The awards were judged by 26 industry experts from New Zealand, Australia and Asia. The New Zealand Herald was awarded Newspaper of the Year.

== Winners ==
=== Photography ===
- Press Photographer of the Year – Senior Stephen Parker (The Daily Post)
- Press Photographer of the Year - Junior Emma Allen (The Marlborough Express)
- Best News Picture Kent Blechynden (The Dominion Post)
- Best Sports Picture Iain McGregor (The Press)
- Best Photo Essay or Slideshow Richard Robinson (The New Zealand Herald)
- Best Feature Photo Natasha Martin - (The Timaru Herald)
- Best Portrait Robert Kitchin - (Manawatu Standard)

=== Online ===
- Best Digital Breaking News Coverage West Auckland tornado (The New Zealand Herald)
- Best Innovation in Multimedia Storytelling The Press Zone Life
- Best Innovation in New Technologies The New Zealand Herald Windows 8 app
- Best Digital Community Interaction The Press Zone Life
- Best News Site nzherald.co.nz
- Best Website stuff.co.nz
- Best Video Mike Scott (Waikato Times)

=== Magazines ===
- Best Newsstand Magazine New Zealand Geographic
- Best Trade or Professional Magazine Young Country
- Best Magazine Design Home
- Magazine Feature Writer of the Year Mike White (North & South)
- Magazine Feature Writer Business & Science Rebecca Macfie (New Zealand Listener)
- Magazine Feature Writer Politics Mike White (North & South)
- Magazine Feature Writer Arts and Entertainment Mike White (North & South)
- Magazine Feature Writer Social Issues Aaron Smale (Mana)
- Magazine Feature Writer Sport Duncan Greive (Metro)
- Magazine Feature Writer Lifestyle Donna Chisholm (North & South)

=== Newspapers ===
- Canon Newspaper of the Year (The New Zealand Herald)
- Newspaper of the Year (over 30,000 circulation) (The New Zealand Herald)
- Newspaper of the Year (up to 30,000 circulation) Bay of Plenty Times
- Weekly Newspaper of the Year The Dominion Post Weekend
- Community Newspaper of the Year Kapi-Mana News
- Best Newspaper Design (The New Zealand Herald)
- Best Newspaper Inserted Magazine The Business (The New Zealand Herald)
- Senior Reporter of the Year David Fisher (The New Zealand Herald)
- Junior Reporter of the Year Sam Boyer (The Dominion Post)
- Reporter Science and Environment Jamie Morton (The New Zealand Herald)
- Reporter Sport Simon Plumb (The Sunday Star-Times)
- Reporter Politics Phil Kitchin (The Dominion Post)
- Reporter Human Relations Jared Savage (The New Zealand Herald)
- Reporter Business Rob Stock (The Sunday Star-Times)
- Reporter Arts & Entertainment Seamus Boyer (The Dominion Post)
- Reporter Lifestyle Bronwyn Torrie (The Dominion Post)
- Senior Newspaper Feature Writer of the Year Adam Dudding (The Sunday Star-Times)
- Junior Newspaper Feature Writer of the Year Aimie Cronin (Waikato Times)
- Newspaper Feature Writer Science and Environment Russell Blackstock (Herald on Sunday)
- Newspaper Feature Writer Sport Ben Stanley (The Sunday Star-Times)
- Newspaper Feature Writer Politics Tracy Watkins (The Dominion Post)
- Newspaper Feature Writer Human Relations Tony Wall (The Sunday Star-Times)
- Newspaper Feature Writer Business Geoff Cumming (WeekendHerald)
- Newspaper Feature Writer Arts and Entertainment Catherine Woulfe (Sunday Magazine)
- Newspaper Feature Writer Lifestyle Aimie Cronin (Waikato Times)

=== General ===
- Best Investigation Phil Kitchin (The Dominion Post)
- Student Journalist of the Year Jenna Lynch (Waikato Times)
- Best Artwork Anna Crichton (The New Zealand Herald)
- Cartoonist of the Year Peter Bromhead (Herald on Sunday)
- Best Columnist John Armstrong (The New Zealand Herald)
- Editorial Writer of the Year Virginia Larson (North & South)
- Best Headline Jonathan Milne (Herald on Sunday)
- Reviewer of the Year Diana Wichtel (New Zealand Listener)
- Wolfson Fellowship to Cambridge Mike White (North & South)
