= 2026 New Zealand Media Awards =

- Awarded for: Excellence in New Zealand journalism
- Sponsored by: No naming sponsorship (withdrawn May 2026), supporting sponsors included ANZ Bank New Zealand, NZ On Air, Spark NZ, Sport NZ and the Media Copyright Agency (MCA)
- Date: 22 May 2026
- Location: Grand Millennium, Auckland
- Country: New Zealand
- Presented by: News Publishers' Association
- Hosted by: Jeremy Corbett
- Website: npa.co.nz/nz-media-awards/

The 2026 New Zealand Media Awards were the 53rd annual New Zealand Media Awards, recognising New Zealand journalism published in 2025. Managed by the News Publishers' Association (NPA), the awards were presented on 22 May 2026 at the Grand Millennium in Auckland, hosted by Jeremy Corbett. Winners were announced across 39 awards in four categories: Written; Audio, Digital and Video; Photography; and All Media.

The awards were originally promoted as the 2026 Voyager Media Awards. On 6 May 2026, two weeks before the ceremony, the NPA terminated Voyager Internet's naming rights sponsorship after becoming aware of social media content reposted by Voyager founder and chief executive Seeby Woodhouse, which the association said was irreconcilable with its values and standards. Woodhouse apologised, and Voyager said it had already decided not to continue as naming sponsor beyond 2026. The ceremony went ahead without a naming sponsor. Supporting sponsors included ANZ Bank New Zealand, NZ On Air, Spark NZ, Sport NZ and the Media Copyright Agency (MCA).

The Rotorua Daily Post was named Newspaper of the Year, and Stuff won Digital News Provider of the Year. RNZ national crime correspondent Sam Sherwood won three awards: Reporter of the Year, News Journalist of the Year and Best Specialist Reporting. Richard Robinson of New Zealand Geographic won Photographer of the Year and two additional photography awards.

== Winners ==
All winners are from the NPA's published results. Several awards are presented with legacy trophies, shown in brackets below (see New Zealand Media Awards: Legacy trophies).

=== Written ===
Award	Winner	Organisation
Newspaper of the Year	Rotorua Daily Post (NZME)	
Metropolitan Newspaper of the Year	NZ Herald (NZME)	
Regional Newspaper of the Year	Rotorua Daily Post (NZME)	
Weekly Newspaper of the Year	Sunday Star-Times (Stuff Group)	
Community Newspaper of the Year	Ashburton Guardian	
Best Newspaper Magazine	Sunday – Rātapu (Stuff Group)	
Best News, Current Affairs or Specialist Publication	The Spinoff	
Reporter of the Year (NZ Media Awards Cup)	Sam Sherwood	RNZ
Feature Writer of the Year	Catherine Woulfe	New Zealand Geographic/Kōwhai Media
Best Up and Coming Feature Writer	Eva de Jong	NZME

=== Audio, Digital and Video ===
Award	Winner	Organisation
Digital News Provider of the Year	stuff.co.nz (Stuff Group)	
Video Journalist of the Year (McKendry Award)	Zoe Madden-Smith	Re: News/TVNZ
Best Current Affairs (Long) or Documentary	Jack Tame and team	Q+A with Jack Tame/TVNZ
Best Current Affairs (Short)	Paddy Gower	stuff.co.nz / Stuff Group
Best Original Podcast or Series	Melanie Reid, Bonnie Sumner, Dave Filoialii and Judith Curran	newsroom.co.nz
Best Innovation in Digital Storytelling	Kate Newton and Hingyi Khong	RNZ
Best Shortform Video	Tory Evans	TVNZ

=== Photography ===
Award	Winner	Organisation
Photographer of the Year (Photographer of the Year Trophy)	Richard Robinson	New Zealand Geographic/Kōwhai Media
Best Photo Story	Richard Robinson	New Zealand Geographic / Kōwhai Media
Best Photography – Features	Richard Robinson	New Zealand Geographic / Kōwhai Media
Best Photography – News	Braden Fastier	Nelson Mail/Stuff Group
Best Photography – Sport	Hannah Peters	Getty Images

=== All Media ===
Award	Winner	Organisation
Editorial Leader of the Year (Editorial Leader of the Year Cup)	Sarah Bristow	NZME
News Journalist of the Year	Sam Sherwood	RNZ
Political Journalist of the Year	Maiki Sherman	1News / TVNZ
Business Journalist of the Year	Matt Nippert	NZ Herald / NZME
Sports Journalist of the Year	Benjamin Plummer	NZ Herald / NZME
Local Journalist of the Year	Jessica Roden	1News / TVNZ
Cartoonist/Animator of the Year	Sharon Murdoch	Stuff Group
Best Investigation	Jared Savage	NZ Herald / NZME
Best Scoop	Tony Wall	stuff.co.nz / Stuff Group
Best Specialist Reporting	Sam Sherwood	RNZ
Best Coverage of a Major News Event	stuff.co.nz (Stuff Group)	
Best Editorial Campaign or Project	Waikato Times (Stuff Group)	
Best Columnist, Opinion or Critique	Virginia Fallon	The Post/Stuff Group
Best Up and Coming Journalist	Emma Andrews	RNZ
Le Mana Pacific Award	Indira Stewart	TVNZ
Te Tohu Kairangi Award	Aaron Smale	Whakaata Māori, RNZ, NZ Listener
Gordon McLauchlan Journalism Award	Michael Wright	The Press/Stuff Group
