= 24SevenOffice =

Norwegian software company

- Formerly: IKT Interactive AS
- Company type: Public
- Industry: Software industry
- Founded: 3 December 1997 in Porsgrunn, Norway
- Founder: Stian Rustad
- Headquarters: Inkognitogaten 33, Oslo, Norway
- Services: SaaS ERP/CRM systems
- Owner: 24Seven Technology Group
- Number of employees: 181
- Website: 24sevenoffice.com

24SevenOffice is a Norwegian software company headquartered in Oslo, Norway, with offices in Stockholm, Sweden and London, United Kingdom. Founded in 1997, the company specializes in web-based (SaaS) ERP and CRM systems.

== Company history ==
24SevenOffice was founded in 1997 in Porsgrunn, Norway, as IKT Interactive AS and marketed as kontorplassen.no. The name "24SevenOffice" was introduced for the company's London branch when the company entered the British market in 2003. The company changed its name to 24SevenOffice in February 2005. Originally based in Skien, the company later moved to Oslo Innovation Center, then to Tjuvholmen in the waterfront Fjord City of Oslo, and now the headquarters are located in Inkognitogaten 33, Solli plass, Oslo.

The idea for the company's product was developed in 1996, and 24SevenOffice was an early innovator in the Scandinavian market in web-based enterprise resource planning solutions (ERP). A British office was established at Surrey Business Park in May 2003, with the company launching its web-based (SaaS) utility computing system to the UK SME market in 2004.

An office in Chennai, India, was established in 2005, and 24SevenOffice entered the Swedish market when they acquired the leading competitor and ERP-provider Start & Run in a cash deal. In August 2005, the company had an initial public offering that raised NOK 15 million, and the company entered The Norwegian Over the Counter Market list as of 5 October 2005 (the ticker was 24SO), reaching a market value of NOK 175 million, with 5000 customers in Norway.

In 2006, the company signed a deal to sponsor rally driver Petter Solberg, at the time the largest private sponsorship in Norwegian sport. Instead of receiving NOK 5 million in cash, Solberg received a 2.9 per cent ownership in the company. The company entered the German-speaking market in April 2006 when an office in Frankfurt am Main was opened. In late August/early September, they established an office with ten sales agents plus a general manager in Stockholm for the Swedish market.

24SevenOffice initiated strategic cooperation with Active 24 in early 2006 to develop a common platform. During the summer, Active 24 was bought by 24SevenOffice's ERP/CRM competitor Mamut (company), and 24SevenOffice terminated the contract with Active 24 in October demanding NOK 200 million in compensation for lost revenue. After a breakdown of settlement negotiations in the Forliksråd in January 2007, 24SevenOffice filed a case against Active 24 for breach of agreement in the Oslo District Court in March. 24SevenOffice lost on all counts in the District Court in December 2007. In January 2008, 24SevenOffice appealed the case to the Borgarting Court of Appeal, reducing the cause of action from NOK 250 to 30 million. 24SevenOffice lost on all counts in the Court of Appeal in December 2008, and was ordered to cover the costs incurred by Active 24 in connection with the dispute totaling NOK 6.91 million. 24SevenOffice appealed the case to the Supreme Court of Norway, but the Supreme Court Appeals Committee in March 2008 unanimously rejected the appeal from 24SevenOffice over the Borgarting Appeal Court's unanimous judgment of December 2008. On a counterclaim from Active 24 and Mamut against 24SevenOffice, the Oslo District Court in May 2010 found, that 24SevenOffice should pay Active 24 NOK 12 million in compensation for wrongfully having terminated the agreement, and a further NOK 360.000 of the opponent's legal costs. 24SevenOffice disagreed with the court ruling, and appealed once again. The Borgarting Court of Appeal in November 2011, ruled to reduce the amount of damages to NOK 4.4 million plus NOK 900.000 in penal interest.

With several scrip issues, 24SevenOffice raised 25 million NOK (about $4 million at the time) between October 2005 and July 2006. They entered into a strategic partnership with Bluegarden, who for 30 years had delivered digital services for payroll, human resource planning, recruitment and training, in March 2006, and they made a large-scale agreement in April 2006, with US telecommunications software company Webex, a competitor to Norwegian Tandberg videoconferencing equipment manufacturer. In September 2006, 24SevenOffice signed an agreement with Fokus Bank to provide their customers with extended functionality in Internet banking.

24SevenOffice had by 2007 reportedly 9000 customers, joined the OpenAjax Alliance, and entered into a strategic partnership with Dun & Bradstreet in May 2007, but despite getting listed on Oslo Axess on 22 June (ticker: TFSO), reaching a market capitalization of NOK 120 million, the company was still losing money. The company ended 2007 with a revenue of NOK 21.7 million.

In 2008, 24SevenOffice bought 50% of the stocks in telecommunication company Oyatel, partnered with Nets Group to facilitate invoicing for businesses, and telecommunications company Telipol chose 24SevenOffice's second-generation Internet platform for its 8,000 users. They announced an increase in revenues in Q2 to 11.1 million, up from 4.7 million in the same period the year before.

24SevenOffice had a turnover of NOK 37 million in the first half of 2009, a doubling compared to the same period the previous year, and presented its first positive EBITDA in Q2.

The Norwegian Association of Auditors signed an agreement with 24SevenOffice in 2011, whereby they only recommend 24SevenOffice as a system for their members to use.

On 27 June 2013, the shareholders of 24SevenOffice took off from the stock exchange and privatized the company. In recent years, the company has invested heavily in finance and accounting – and got leading auditing companies such as PwC and KPMG on the customer list.

== Products ==
24SevenOffice is a web-based (SaaS) ERP system. It includes modules for CRM, accounting, invoicing, e-mail, file/document management and project management.

== Awards ==
24SevenOffice won the Seal of Excellence in Multimedia Award at the 2004 CeBIT, became Norwegian Gazelle Company of the year 2004, chosen by Dagens Næringsliv and Dun & Bradstreet, won Product of the Year in the Norwegian finance magazine Kapital, and the IKT Grenland Innovation Award in 2008.
