= Bert Roth Award for Labour History =

The Bert Roth Award for Labour History, named for the late historian Bert Roth, is presented annually by the Labour History Project to the work that best depicts the history of work and resistance in New Zealand. It was created in May 2013 in recognition of Roth's contribution to labour movement archives and history.

== Recipients ==
- 2014: Rebecca Macfie, Tragedy at Pike River Mine: How and why 29 Men died (Awa Press)
- 2015: Nicholas Hoare Imperial Dissenters: Anti-Colonial Voices in New Zealand, 1883-1945, MA, Victoria University of Wellington
- 2016: Melissa Williams, Pangaru in the City: Kāinga Tahi, Kāinga Rua (Wellington: Bridget Williams Books)
- 2017: Poi E: The Story of our Song, directed by Tearepa Kahi
- 2018: Helen McNeil, A Striking Truth (Cloud Ink Press). Runner-up: Renée, These Two Hands: a memoir (Mākaro Press)
- 2019: David Haines and Jonathan West, "Crew Cultures in the Tasman World" in Francis Steele, ed., New Zealand and the Sea: Historical Perspectives (Wellington: Bridget Williams Books). Runner-up: Caren Wilton, My Body My Business: NZ Sex Workers in an Era of Change (Dunedin: Otago University Press)
- 2020: Jared Davidson, Dead Letters: Censorship and Subversion in New Zealand 1914-1920 (Dunedin: Otago University Press). Runner-up: Helen Kelly - Together, directed by Tony Sutorius
- 2021: Noel O’Hare, Tooth and Veil: The Life and Times of the New Zealand Dental Nurse (Auckland: Massey University Press). Runner-up: Mark Derby, Rock College: An Unofficial history of Mt Eden Prison (Auckland: Massey University Press)
- 2022: Julia Laite, The Disappearance of Lydia Harvey: A True Story of Sex, Crime and the Meaning of Justice (London: Profile Books). Runner-up: Rebecca Macfie, Helen Kelly: Her Life (Wellington: Awa Press)
- 2023: Joint winners: Cybele Locke, Comrade: Bill Andersen – A Communist, Working-Class Life (Wellington: Bridget Williams Books) and Gay Simpkin and Marie Russell (eds.), Women Will Rise! Recalling the Working Women’s Charter (Wellington: Steele Roberts)
- 2024: Jared Davidson, Blood and Dirt: Prison Labour and the Making of New Zealand (Wellington: Bridget Williams Books). Runner-up: Toby Boraman, 'Nullifying Austerity: Stoppages Against the Nil General Wage Order', New Zealand Journal of History 57:2
