= Jenny Wheeler =

New Zealand editor

Jennifer Sylvia "Jenny" Wheeler is an Auckland newspaper journalist, magazine editor, author and company director, born in Thames 21 December 1946. She was founding editor of the Sunday Star newspaper (1987–1993) and NZ House & Garden magazine, (1993–94) and the first woman editor of the New Zealand Listener (1994–1997). From 1997 with partner the late Tim Bickerstaff she was a director of direct marketing companies Happy Families Ltd and Intenza NZ. She sold the company in 2015 and is now working as a novelist and podcaster. She published the first four books in a Californian historical mystery series, Of Gold & Blood, in 2018. In October 2018, she was given a Lifetime Achievement Award by the Magazine Publisher's Association for Services to magazines. Her Joys of Binge Reading podcast profiles popular authors in mystery, thriller, historical and romance genres.

== Early life ==
The eldest of four daughters raised in a small farming community on the edge of the Hauraki Plains. Wheeler's parents met and married in Oxford, England during World War II.

Her father, Arthur Bevan Wheeler, DFC, was a New Zealand-trained bomber pilot who had worked in the NZ Post Office at Turua before joining the Royal New Zealand Air Force; her Oxford-born mother Peggy May Wheeler, was a former Wren who worked at Bletchley Park deciphering German communications.

Her father's family lived at Ngatea on the Hauraki Plains and when he returned from service he went farming nearby at Mangatarata.

Wheeler got her primary schooling at Mangatarata School – a one teacher country school with around a dozen pupils when she started her education – and then as a boarder at Diocesan High School (1960–64).

She did a Bachelor of Arts degree at Auckland University (1965–67) a teaching diploma at the Secondary Teachers College, Auckland (1968) and then taught English, history and social studies at Wellington East Girls High School (1969).

== Career in journalism ==
Wheeler joined the New Zealand Herald as a general news reporter (1971–75), spent a year in Melbourne as assistant press secretary to the Anglican Archbishop of Melbourne (1976), was a staff writer at the New Zealand Woman's Weekly (1978–84), news reporter at the Auckland Star (1985), and then Auckland Star features editor (1986–87).

As editor of the Sunday Star, she was the second woman to be editor of a metropolitan newspaper – the first was Dr Judy McGregor, who was editor of the Sunday News and the Auckland Star.

She was the first woman editor of the New Zealand Listener, taking over from Terry Snow.

Wheeler maintains an interest in media and is regularly called upon to act as a judge for the Canon Awards and Magazine Publisher's Association Awards.

== Health products entrepreneur ==
In 1997, Wheeler began a health supplements direct marketing company Happy Families Ltd with her partner, former talk back radio host and sports journalist Tim Bickerstaff. They began by marketing Nectar Ease honey with added bee venom and went on to develop a range of honey products under the brand name Honeybalm, including a veterinary line for older dogs and horses with mobility problems. In 1999, they started marketing men's erectile dysfunction product Herbal Ignite and prostate health supplement Quup (later to become Prostate PowerFlow.) After Bickerstaff's death in 2009, Sam Kamani was appointed a director of the new company, Intenza NZ Ltd, and the Honeybalm range was discontinued. They sold the company in 2015 to pursue other interests.

== Publications ==
With Gill Ellis she co-authored Women Managers: Success on our own terms, Career Strategies For New Zealand Women, Penguin, 1991. ISBN 978-0-14-013331-8.

With Tim Bickerstaff, Josh Easby and John Andrews; Heroes and Villains, Hilton Valentine, ISBN 978-0-473-05194-5, Hong Kong, 1998

With Suzanne Holmes, Missing You, Finding Hope in Hardship, Terabinth Estate Publishing, ISBN 0473309009 2014

Of Gold & Blood, Series One, Books 1 - 3, published by Happy Families Ltd, ISBN 978-0-473-46238-3 2018

Poisoned Legacy, Book One in Of Gold & Blood, published by Happy Families Ltd, ISBN 9780473430030 2018

Brother Betrayed, Book Two in Of Gold & Blood, published by Happy Families Ltd, ISBN 9780473430078 2018

Double Jeopardy, Book Three in Of Gold & Blood, published by Happy Families Ltd, ISBN 9780473448189 2018

Tangled Destiny, A Christmas Novella, Book Four in Of Gold & Blood, published by Happy Families Ltd, ISBN 9780473459840 2018
