= Statutory liquidity ratio =

Indian political jargon

In India, the Statutory liquidity ratio (SLR) is the Government term for the reserve requirement that commercial banks are required to maintain in the form of cash, gold reserves, Govt. bonds and other central bank approved securities before providing credit to the customers. The SLR to be maintained by banks is determined by the RBI in order to control liquidity expansion. The SLR is determined as a percentage of total demand and time liabilities. Time liabilities refer to the liabilities which the commercial banks are liable to repay to the customers after an agreed period, and demand liabilities are customer deposits which are repayable on demand. An example of a time liability is a six-month fixed deposit which is not payable on demand but only after six months. An example of a demand liability is a deposit maintained in a saving account or current account that is payable on demand.

The SLR is commonly used to control inflation and fuel growth, by decreasing or increasing the money supply. Indian banks' holdings of government securities are now close to the statutory minimum that banks are required to hold to comply with existing regulation. When measured in rupees, such holdings decreased for the first time in a little less than 40 years (since the nationalisation of banks in 1969) in 2005–06. It is 18.00 percent as in June 2020.

== Usage ==
SLR is used by bankers and indicates the minimum percentage of deposits that the bank has to maintain in form of gold, cash or other approved securities. Thus, we can say that it is ratio of cash and some other approved liability (deposits). It regulates the credit growth in India.

The liabilities that the banks are liable to pay within one month's time, due to completion of maturity period, are also considered as time liabilities. The maximum limit of SLR is 40% and minimum limit of SLR is 0 In India, Reserve Bank of India always determines the percentage of SLR.

There are some statutory requirements for temporarily placing the money in government bonds. Following this requirement, Reserve Bank of India fixes the level of SLR. However, as most banks currently keep an SLR higher than required (>26%) due to lack of credible lending options, near term reductions are unlikely to increase liquidity and are more symbolic.

The SLR is fixed for a number of reasons. The chief driving force is increasing or decreasing liquidity which can result in a desired outcome. A few uses of mandating SLR are:

- Controlling the expansion of bank credit. By changing the level of SLR, the Reserve Bank of India can increase or decrease bank credit expansion.
- Ensuring the solvency of commercial banks
- By reducing the level of SLR, the RBI can increase liquidity with the commercial banks, resulting in increased investment. This is done to fuel growth and demand.
- Compelling the commercial banks to invest in government securities like government bonds

If any Indian bank fails to maintain the required level of the statutory liquidity ratio, it becomes liable to pay penalty to the Reserve Bank of India. The defaulter bank pays penal interest at the rate of 3% per annum above the bank rate, on the shortfall amount for that particular day. However, according to the Circular released by the Department of Banking Operations and Development, Reserve Bank of India, if the defaulter bank continues to default on the next working day, the rate of penal interest can be increased to 5% per annum above the bank rate. This restriction is imposed by RBI on banks to make funds available to customers on demand as soon as possible. Gold and government securities (or gilts) are included along with cash because they are highly liquid and safe assets.

The RBI can increase the SLR to control inflation, suck liquidity out of the market, to tighten the measure to safeguard the customers' money. Decrease in SLR rate is done to encourage growth. In a growing economy banks would like to invest in stock market, not in government securities or gold as the latter would yield less returns. One more reason is long term government securities (or any bond) are sensitive to interest rate changes. However, in an emerging economy, interest rate change is a common activity.

== Value and formula ==
The quantum is specified as some percentage of the total demand and time liabilities ( i.e. the liabilities of the bank which are payable on demand anytime, and those liabilities which are accruing in one months time due to maturity) of a bank.

SLR rate = (liquid assets / (demand + time liabilities)) × 100%

This percentage is fixed by the Reserve Bank of India. The maximum limit for the SLR was 40% in India. Following the amendment of the Banking regulation Act (1949) in January 2017, the floor rate of 20.75% for SLR was removed. From April 11, 2020, rate of SLR is 18.00%.

== See also ==
- Bank rate
- Basel Accords
- Capital adequacy
- Cash reserve ratio
