= Three Boys Gone =

- Author: Mark Smith
- Language: English
- Genre: Psychological thriller
- Publisher: Macmillan
- Publication date: 31 December 2024
- Publication place: Australia
- ISBN: 1761567241
- OCLC: 1458557110

Three Boys Gone is a psychological thriller novel written by Australian author Mark Smith. It follows Grace Disher, a high school teacher who chooses not to save three of her students who are met with perilous surf conditions when they go for a swim, knowing that she would die if she had dived in to rescue them.

== Reception ==
Michael Jongen of the Newtown Review of Books called the novel "fine" and "gripping from the very first pages", stating: "It is strong on the moral dilemmas and guilt Grace faces, and its depiction of the impact of tragedy on the school community feels authentic, as does the exploration of both legacy and social media." Tony Nielsen of New Zealand Media and Entertainment called it "disturbing psychological thriller that is confrontational and totally unpredictable." The Sunday Star-Times called it "twisty, multi-layered" and "expertly plotted and executed", opining that it is a "pacey thriller that is a thoughtful examination of grief, guilt and blame in an era of social media witch-hunts, where misinformation spreads like a virus."
