= Lundy murders =

2000 New Zealand murders

- Location: Palmerston North, New Zealand
- Date: 29 August 2000; 26 years ago
- Attack type: Murder by bludgeoning
- Victims: Christine Marie Lundy (age 38); Amber Grace Lundy (age 7)
- Perpetrator: Mark Edward Lundy

Mark Edward Lundy is a former travelling salesman who lived in Palmerston North with his wife Christine Marie Lundy, 38, and their 7-year-old daughter Amber Grace Lundy. On the morning of 29 August 2000, Mark Lundy (then aged 43) drove to Petone on business and checked in at the Foreshore Motor Lodge at around 5:00 pm. That evening, he had an encounter with a prostitute at the motel at about 11:45 pm, and she left around 12:48 am (on 30 August). He checked out at 8:09 in the morning.

The murdered bodies of his wife and daughter were found about an hour later by Christine’s brother, Glenn Weggery who went to the Lundy home in Palmerston North around 9.00am. Both had been attacked with a tomahawk like implement (which was never found) leaving blood and tissue splattered on the ceiling and walls. Twenty-one hairs, presumably belonging to the attacker, were found under Christine Lundy's fingernails, but were never tested or analysed for DNA. Police initially had 60 suspects, one of whom committed suicide five days after the bodies were found. Police ruled out 55 of the 60 suspects and focussed on Mark Lundy. In February 2001, after a six-month investigation, he was arrested and charged.

At his first trial, the prosecution argued that a tiny mark found on Lundy's shirt was Christine's brain tissue. They claimed he left Petone immediately after making a phone call to his wife at 5:30, drove 134 kilometres (83 mi) to Palmerston North, killed his wife and daughter at about 7:00 pm, disposed of his bloody clothes and the murder weapon, altered the timing on the family computer to suggest they were still alive at 7:00 pm, and drove the same 134 kilometres back to Petone by 8:28 pm - a journey of three hours. A private investigator who made the journey three times, testified his fastest trip took him two hours each way. In 2002, Lundy was convicted of the murders and sentenced to life imprisonment with a minimum non-parole period of 17 years.

For more than 20 years, he has claimed he is innocent. In 2002, he unsuccessfully took his case to the New Zealand Court of Appeal, and in 2013 appealed to the Privy Council in Britain. His convictions were quashed because exculpatory evidence about the reliability of testing done on brain tissue (that had been withheld at the first trial) led to profound divisions between the experts, and a re-trial was ordered.

At the retrial in 2015, the prosecution presented an entirely different version of events. They now claimed that Lundy drove to Palmerston North and back in the middle of the night - after spending time with a sex worker in Petone. They also presented the results of different tests, this time based on mRNA, conducted on the spots on Lundy's shirt. In April 2015, he was found guilty again. The mRNA evidence was subsequently ruled inadmissible, but the jury had already heard it. In 2017, Lundy took this issue to the Court of Appeal. The appeal was dismissed, as the court decided all the other evidence still proved he was guilty.

In 2022, the new Criminal Cases Review Commission (CCRC) agreed to investigate his case. He was granted parole in April 2025 and was released on 7 May after serving 23 years in prison. His case is still being investigated by the CCRC and his supporters said they would continue the fight to prove he was innocent.

== Background ==
Prior to the murders, Mark and Christine Lundy had been married for 17 years; Amber was their only child. They jointly owned a kitchen sink business. The company was often in debt to their supplier for around $100,000. In 1999, Mark Lundy added to their debt by buying two plots of land to grow grapes in Hawke's Bay. The owners of the plots, Christopher Morrison and Douglas Twigg, told the court at Lundy's second trial that the sale went unconditional in early 2000. Lundy missed a number of settlement dates without paying, which led to penalty interest of about 14%. At the time of the murders, the Lundys owed $140,000 in penalty interest. The final deadline was August 30, 2000 – the day his wife and daughter were found dead.

A few months earlier, an insurance salesman, Bruce Parson, reviewed the couple's life insurance and the Lundys agreed on an increase from $200,000 to $500,000. The Lundys signed the new agreement on 25 August, five days before the murders. However, Mr Parson told the Lundys the new amount would not apply until the policy document was issued. Christine Lundy was murdered before the process was finalised. Nevertheless, the Crown alleged that Mark Lundy killed her, intending to use the increased payout from her life insurance to cover his mounting debts. After Christine's death, Tower Insurance paid $75,000 off the Lundy's mortgage but no cash payment was made.

== Events on the day of the murders ==
On the morning of Tuesday, 29 August 2000, Lundy drove from Palmerston North to Wellington on one of his regular business trips. He checked into a motel in Petone at around 5:00 pm. His wife or daughter called him on his cell phone in Petone at 5:30pm and they spoke for eight minutes; Lundy said he was told during the call that they were going to McDonald's for dinner. Police later found a McDonald's receipt in the Lundy home for food bought at 5:45 pm. Christine Lundy took a call at home from a friend just before 7:00 pm that night.

Mark Lundy's cell phone records showed he made a call from Petone to a business partner of his Hawke's Bay wine-making venture at 8:28 pm. The computer at the Lundy home in Palmerston North was switched off at 10:52 pm. At 11:30 pm Lundy called an escort service in Petone from his motel. She left the motel at about 1 am.

At Lundy's retrial in 2015, Christine's brother testified that he went to the Lundy home the next morning to see Christine about a business matter. He said he entered through an open ranchslider and found the bodies of Christine and Amber bludgeoned to death. Christine's body was on her bed; Amber's was on the floor in the doorway of Christine's bedroom. Both had died of head injuries caused by multiple blows from what was determined to be a tomahawk-like weapon or small axe - although no weapon was ever found. A rear window had been tampered with and had Christine's blood on it. A jewellery box was later determined to be missing.

At the first trial in 2002, the police claimed Lundy drove up to Palmerston North on the 29th, killed his wife and daughter and drove back to Petone in the three hours between the two phone calls - the first with his wife at 5.30pm and the second with a business partner at 8.28pm. At the second trial in 2015, the police said he drove to Palmerston North and committed the murders in the middle of the night after the prostitute who came to his motel went home at about 1.00am (on the 30th).

== Lundy's demeanor at the funeral ==
At the funeral of his wife and daughter, Lundy appeared so distressed, he had to be supported by a couple of friends. His overt grief was filmed and repeatedly shown on television. His dramatic "outpouring of grief" and collapse at the funeral was covered widely in the media and became the subject of extensive "comment and public debate focusing closely on Mr. Lundy's credibility". In 2018, the Court of Appeal agreed that members of the jury were likely "exposed to repeated showings of the footage of Lundy at the funeral" during the trial.

Lundy's lawyer, Jonathan Eaton QC, said the funeral footage made Lundy appear as a pathetic, comedic figure. Eaton believes the image became ingrained in people's minds, and that the constant replaying of scenes from the funeral inevitably affected the jury at both trials, and had a serious effect on the outcome.

== First trial ==
After a police investigation of six months, Lundy was arrested and charged with their murders. The trial took place in the High Court in Palmerston North.

=== Prosecution case ===
Four days before the murders, the Lundy's reviewed their life insurance on the advice of their insurance broker. Christine's cover was going to be raised from $200,000 to $500,000. However, at the time of her death, the policy documents had not been issued so the increase was not valid. Nevertheless, the prosecution contended that Lundy killed his wife for her life insurance money because of financial pressure, and killed his daughter because she was a witness. The police claimed the murders occurred in Palmerston North, two hours away by car, between 5:30pm and 8:28pm. They claimed that Lundy drove "at break-neck speed from Wellington to Palmerston North, killed his family and drove back to Wellington" within three hours.

The prosecution called more than 130 people to testify. Their case was primarily based on a speck of body tissue found on one of Lundy's polo shirts; the shirt was found along with other clothes and miscellaneous items on the back seat of his car. Although New Zealand pathologists could not identify it as Christine's brain tissue, a pathologist from Texas, Dr Rodney Miller, claimed that he did. The prosecution argued the only way this brain tissue could have got on the shirt was if Lundy himself was the murderer. Later reports and tests by other experts cast doubt upon the identification of the material as brain tissue, and at Lundy's second trial, Miller later admitted that his laboratory was not accredited to do forensic work.

No weapon was ever found, although pathologist James Pang determined it was possibly a tomahawk. The police sent 47 paint fragments to be examined by the Institute of Environmental Science and Research (ESR). Nine had orange flecks and another nine had light-blue flecks. These were described as “indistinguishable” from samples taken from three tools and two paint tins in the garage. In 16 of these 18 samples, the ESR noted there was contamination. Also the chemical match of the paint flecks was never provided to the defence - nor was it described in court. The police eventually recovered a tomahawk from among Lundy’s possessions, but it wasn’t marked with paint, and did not test positive for blood.

=== The witness - Margaret Dance ===
The only person who claimed to have seen Lundy in Palmerston North at the time of the crime was Margaret Dance— a 60-year-old woman, who said she had "psychic powers and a photographic memory". She lived about 500 metres from the Lundy home and said she had seen a man wearing a blond wig who "appeared to be trying to look like a woman" running on the street at about 7:15 pm. She also said she saw seven other people outside a takeaway shop in the area. Nobody else, including the seven people she described, saw anyone running in the area that night.

Margaret Dance described the person she claimed she saw as “running fast”. However, in What the Jury Didn't Hear, Mike White wrote that Mark Lundy weighed 130 kg, wore an orthotic aid in one shoe after an accident that required ankle surgery and struggled to do anything vaguely athletic. Margaret Dance was not called as a witness at the second trial.

=== Defence case ===
The defence called three witnesses including Lundy himself, who emphatically denied killing his wife and daughter. A key defence argument was that Lundy could not possibly have made the round trip from Wellington to Palmerston North and back in three hours, pointing out that Lundy's phone records prove that his phone was in Petone at 5:38 pm and at 8:29 pm.

Regarding the brain tissue evidence, the defence noted that there was blood and tissue splattered everywhere including on the walls, the bed and the floor around the bodies but "his car, glasses, wedding ring, shoes and other clothes were all tested for blood or other tissue and absolutely nothing was found"; they said contamination could account for the tissue found on Lundy's shirt.

=== Verdict ===
The jury deliberated for seven hours before finding Lundy guilty of the murder of his wife and child. He was sentenced to life in prison with a minimum non-parole period of 17 years.

=== Court of Appeal ===
Lundy unsuccessfully appealed to the Court of Appeal in 2002, and the appeal resulted in his non-parole period being increased from 17 years to 20 years.

=== Role of media since first trial ===
In 2009, North & South magazine published the results of an investigation into the case by Mike White titled The Lundy murders: what the jury didn't hear. Lundy would have had only three hours to make the return journey from Petone to Palmerston North, a round trip of approximately 290 km (180 mi), kill his wife and daughter, change his clothes and dispose of evidence; White contended that was not possible in such a short time frame. In order to make it back to Petone by 8.28 pm, Lundy would have had to drive to Palmerston North in rush hour traffic at an average speed of around 117 km/h (73 mph; the maximum open road speed limit in New Zealand at the time was 100 km/h, 62 mph), commit the crimes, and make the return journey back to Petone at an average speed of 120 km/h (75 mph).

In 2012, documentary film maker, Bryan Bruce made an episode examining the Lundy case as part of his series The Investigator. Like others, Bruce believed that Lundy could not possibly have made the return trip in three hours, but he thought Lundy could have made the trip and committed the crimes later that night, returning to Petone in the early hours of the morning.

=== Police destroyed crucial evidence ===
In 2020, journalist Mike White reported that 21 hairs found under Christine Lundy's fingernails, that may have identified the murderer were never tested, and that the police later destroyed them. The evidence suggests she struggled with her attacker, and ten hairs were found under the fingernails of her right hand and 11 in her left. The police sent them to the ESR to be tested. Apparently, the bags containing the hairs remained at the ESR for nine months, before being returned to police in June 2001, without being examined. After Lundy was convicted in 2002, he wrote to police a number of times asking that everything connected to his case should be preserved. In December 2003, the police ignored these requests and destroyed this important forensic evidence.

In 2025, Mike White disclosed that other forensic evidence was never tested. A scientist found blood soaked fibres on a window next to the door where police believe the offender entered the Lundys’ house. Police sent these to the ESR as well, but again, the fibres were never tested. The police were unable to explain why the fibres were never examined.

== Privy Council ==
In November 2012, Lundy applied to the Judicial Committee of the Privy Council seeking permission to appeal his murder convictions. The hearing before the Privy Council (including Chief Justice of New Zealand Dame Sian Elias) began on 17 June 2013.

The appeal was based on three main issues: the time of death, the time of shutdown of Christine's computer, and the claim that brain tissue was found on Lundy's shirt. A week before the hearing began, the Crown Law Office finally released a document to the defence team which had not been seen by any of Lundy's lawyers prior to the trial in 2002. The document was written by the officer in charge of the original investigation, Detective Sergeant Ross Grantham, and contained a statement by neuropathologist, Dr Heng Teoh. Dr Teoh said in the statement that the tissue found on Lundy's shirt was too degenerated to identify as brain tissue and could not be used to convict.

Affidavits sworn by three other experts in immunohistochemistry, Professors Phillip Sheard, Helen Whitwell and Kevin Gatter, all concluded the tissue was poorly preserved. They concluded the IHC procedure conducted by Texas pathologist, Dr Rodney Miller, was an "uncontrolled experiment" incapable of producing a reliable outcome.

On 4 October 2013, the Privy Council quashed Lundy's convictions stating that "the divisions between the experts are so profound, they range over so many areas and they relate to matters which are so central to the guilt or innocence of the appellant, that the Board has concluded that they may only properly be resolved by the triers of fact in a (new) trial". After the Privy Council decision, he was released on bail and was in the community for 18 months before his second trial.

== Second trial ==
In 2015 Lundy was tried a second time. The Crown case was led by Philip Morgan QC. The defence was led by David Hislop QC. The Crown made significant changes to the prosecution case against Lundy following the ruling of the Privy Council. They no longer claimed that Lundy made a 300 km round trip from Petone to Palmerston North in less than three hours to commit the murders. Instead, police now alleged that Lundy drove to Petone in the early hours of Wednesday 30 August after the escort went home.

Also, the Crown no longer relied on the testimony of the only 'witness', self-proclaimed psychic, Margaret Dance, either. She was not asked to testify at the second trial.

The jury also heard about scientific tests which were conducted on tissue found on one of Lundy's shirts. The Crown claimed the stains were brain or spinal cord matter from Christine while the defence argued they could have been stains from a meat pie. The tests were developed specifically for the Lundy case by a laboratory in the Netherlands and compared the tissue on the shirt with brain tissue from animals, including a chicken and a cat. Some initial trials were positive for animals, but the error rate was never established.

Lundy was found guilty for the second time in April 2015.

== Subsequent appeals ==
=== Second Court of Appeal ===
In October 2017, Lundy appealed his second conviction at the Court of Appeal in Wellington. The court said the RNA evidence should not have been admitted at trial as it required the jury to "resolve a complicated scientific debate about whether the mRNA testing was sufficiently robust, which the jury was not equipped to do." Lundy’s lawyer, Jonathan Eaton, KC, said this evidence "should not have been there because it was flawed science".

Nevertheless, the Court dismissed Lundy's appeal in October 2018. Even though the Court decided the RNA evidence was inadmissable, it concluded the appeal should be dismissed "on the basis that no substantial miscarriage of justice has actually occurred."

=== Supreme Court ===
Lundy was found guilty in the second trial after the results of two different tests, immunohistochemistry [IHC] and mRNA, conducted on tissue found on one of his shirts were presented to the jury. The Court of Appeal subsequently ruled the mRNA evidence was novel science that had never been used before, or since, and should not have been presented to the jury – but upheld Lundy's convictions anyway. This was the 'proviso', the mechanism that allowed the Court of Appeal to dismiss Lundy's appeal. Lundy's lawyer, Jonathan Eaton QC, then argued to the Supreme Court that Lundy had become the victim of 'junk science' and in May 2019, he was granted leave to have his appeal heard by the Supreme Court - solely on the proviso argument.

On 20 December 2019, the Supreme Court of New Zealand dismissed Lundy's appeal, stating in its concluding paragraph that "The other evidence establishes beyond reasonable doubt that Mr Lundy murdered Christine and Amber Lundy."

=== Role of the media since second trial ===
In 2020, North & South journalist, Mike White, revealed that "crucial evidence that could have convicted or cleared Mark Lundy of murdering his wife and daughter was never tested, and then destroyed by police." Twenty-one hairs, which may have come from Christine's attacker as she defended herself, were found tangled in her fingers at the post-mortem examination of her body. The hairs were sent to the ESR for testing in two plastic bags. The bags sat untouched at ESR for nine months and were then returned to police in June 2001. After he was convicted in 2002, Lundy wrote to police requesting all material connected to his case be preserved. The police ignored this request and, in December 2003, destroyed the hairs. Detective Inspector Marc Hercock, the lead investigator at the retrial in 2015, confirmed that the hairs were never looked at or tested.

== Legal analysis of scientific evidence ==
In 2020, as part of her dissertation submitted for the degree of Bachelor of Laws (Honours), Romy Wales analysed the New Zealand rules of evidence with particular reference to novel scientific evidence from tests (immunohistochemistry (IHC) and mRNA tests) performed on tissue found on Lundy's shirt.

Daubert established that the admissibility of novel scientific evidence in a criminal case depends on whether the technique has a known error rate, has been peer reviewed, and has been generally accepted in the relevant scientific field. Wales says that IHC is a widely used technique, but that in Lundy's first trial, it was applied in a novel manner. She cites an affidavit from an Associate Professor of Physiology, who said that IHC was "potentially inconsistent and unreliable".

The Court of Appeal later determined that the evidence was inadmissible, since the IHC testing had not been done by a forensic pathologist, and the mRNA testing method had never been subject to peer review. However, both juries had already heard the evidence which was later ruled inadmissible.

Wales was concerned that "the results of both of these tests formed a significant part of some fairly circumstantial evidence". She noted that in 2018, the Court of Appeal said the jury had been asked "to carry out a task for which they cannot have been equipped. We think it would be surprising if the jury understood much of the evidence that was called on the subject".

== Parole Board hearings ==
In August 2022, Lundy attended his first parole board hearing having served his minimum term of 20 years. He was denied release because the Board was concerned he didn't have a safety plan to address triggers which might lead to further offending. Lundy said he was unable to create a plan because he was innocent and had never been triggered to commit murder. "It's rather difficult to do a safety plan for something I haven't done," he said. The Board also expressed concerns about his drinking pattern prior to the murders.

At his second hearing in May 2023, Lundy was questioned by board chairman Sir Ron Young about his motivation for the murders. Lundy replied that this was a difficult question for him to answer, because he didn't have a motive for something he didn't do. Since the previous hearing, he had attended treatment for his drinking problem from 20 years ago. Psychologists who interviewed him said he had a low risk of reoffending. However, parole was declined once again because he didn't have a safety plan. Lundy said he couldn't manufacture a safety plan to address something of which he was innocent.

=== Release from prison ===
After another hearing in April 2025, he was granted parole after serving 23 years in prison. He was released on 7 May. He will not be allowed to visit the Manawatū which means he will be unable to visit the graves of his wife and daughter, and is banned from internet dating, social media and media interviews. He will also be required to inform his probation office of any relationships, or employment.

=== Media ban ===
In June 2025, a number of lawyers including media law expert Steven Price, pointed out that banning him from speaking to the media meant he could no longer proclaim his innocence which was a breach of free speech principles under the New Zealand Bill of Rights. Private investigator, Tim McKinnel also pointed to the risks of preventing him from speaking to the media. He told Radio New Zealand, "Look at the history of wrongful conviction cases in New Zealand. There is scarcely a case when the media haven't played a fundamentally important role in exposing those miscarriages of justice."

In December 2025, the Parole Board reported that Lundy had been abiding by all his release conditions and removed the ban they placed on him which prevented him from speaking to the media. However, he is still not allowed to use social media.

== Other suspects ==
=== 60 other suspects ===
Police initially had 60 suspects. 55 of these were ruled out prior to Lundy's first trial in 2000 because, at that time, the police believed the murders occurred around 7pm on 29 August. At Lundy's second trial in 2015, the Police now claimed the murders occurred in the early hours the following day - but never checked the alibis of these suspects on 30 August. One suspect, Sheridan Martin Murphy, was a real estate agent in Palmerston North. He killed himself on 4 September, 2000, five days after Christine and Amber Lundy were murdered.

=== Geoff Levick's theory ===
Geoff Levick, who runs a campaign to have Lundy's convictions overturned, speculated that a creditor of Lundy paid someone to go to Lundy's house to "teach him a lesson", but Lundy was not there and matters "got out of hand".

Levick also claimed that an associate of Lundy's was threatened by someone over outstanding debts on the day of the murders. The victim called the police and then rang both Christine and Mark Lundy to warn them. Police were aware of these events and subsequently offered this man immunity if he admitted his involvement in the murders. He denied having anything to do with it and was never charged.

=== Defence counsel theory ===
At the retrial, defence counsel David Hislop, KC, suggested Christine's brother, Glenn Weggery, had been molesting Amber Lundy and accused him of the murders. He said that when police examined his car, blood was found inside the boot. Blood was also found near the driver's seat and on a towel in Weggery's truck. Traces of blood were also found in the bathroom of his house, on a pair of his underwear and a handkerchief in his house, which were an 83% match to Christine's DNA and an 88% match to Amber's.

=== Destruction of evidence ===
Defence counsel Ross Burns asked questions about DNA found in Christine and Amber's fingernail scrapings which came from two different men. This testing was done shortly before the retrial but was not available at the original trial, although who the DNA came from has never been established. Christine also had 21 strands of hair tangled in her hands which did not match her husband's hair. The hairs were sent to the ESR, but were never tested. The police destroyed them before the second trial.

== Lundy 500 ==
In July 2009, and again in 2013, university students proposed races whereby teams of vehicles would travel from Petone to Palmerston North, in an attempt to recreate the journey Mark Lundy was alleged to have made in order to commit the murders within the timeline. The events were supposed to be called the "Lundy 500" and the "Lundy Three Hundy" in reference to the Undie 500, a student road race between Christchurch and Dunedin. Both events were called off after negative publicity.
