= 2014 Canon Media Awards =

- Awarded for: Excellence in New Zealand print and online media.
- Sponsored by: Canon New Zealand
- Date: 9 May 2014
- Location: Pullman Hotel, Auckland
- Country: New Zealand
- Hosted by: Newspaper Publishers' Association
- Website: canonmediaawards.co.nz

The 2014 Canon Media Awards were hosted by the New Zealand Newspaper Publishers' Association on Friday 9 May 2014 at the Pullman Hotel in Auckland, New Zealand. The Newspaper of the Year was The Dominion Post, and the Reporter of the Year was Andrea Vance of Fairfax Media's political bureau.

In August 2014, there were calls for the withdrawal of the Canon Media Award for Best Blog presented to Cameron Slater at the 2014 Canon Media Awards due to allegations of the recipient's involvement in political impropriety as published that same month in the book Dirty Politics. The Newspaper Publishers' Association did not withdraw the award, and released a statement that allegations presented in Dirty Politics did not constitute sufficient evidence or proof of wrongdoing.

== Winners ==
=== Photography ===
- Press Photographer of the Year Richard Robinson (The New Zealand Herald)
- Junior Press Photographer of the Year Alden Williams (The Nelson Mail)
- Best News Picture Craig Simcox (The Dominion Post)
- Best Sports Picture Iain McGregor (The Press)
- Best Portrait Hannah Johnston (Getty)
- Best Feature Photo Stephen Parker (Rotorua Daily Post)
- Best Photo Essay/Slideshow Brett Phibbs (The New Zealand Herald)

=== Online ===
- Best Digital Breaking News Coverage nzherald.co.nz
- Best Innovation in Multimedia Storytelling Stuff.co.nz – Lost in the Long White Cloud
- Best Innovation in New Technologies Viva (The New Zealand Herald)
- Best Digital Community Interaction The Wellington Report (The Dominion Post)
- Best Video Mike Scott (Waikato Times/Stuff.co.nz)
- Best Blog Cameron Slater (Whale Oil)
- Best News site stuff.co.nz
- Best Website Yahoo NZ

=== Magazines ===
- Best Newsstand Magazine (Metro)
- Best Trade/Professional Magazine New Zealand Doctor
- Best Magazine Design Taste
- Best Magazine Cover HOME
- Magazine Feature Writer of the Year Steve Braunias (Metro)
- Magazine Feature Writer Business and Politics Rebecca Macfie (New Zealand Listener)
- Magazine Feature Writer Crime and Justice Steve Braunias (Metro)
- Magazine Feature Writer Health and Education Catherine Woulfe (New Zealand Listener)
- Magazine Feature Writer Science and Environment Mike White (North & South)
- Magazine Feature Writer Arts and Entertainment Duncan Greive (Metro)
- Magazine Feature Writer Sport Duncan Greive (Metro)
- Magazine Feature Writer General Amanda Cropp (North & South)

=== Newspapers ===
- Canon Newspaper of the Year The Dominion Post
- Newspaper of the Year (plus 30,000 circulation) The Dominion Post
- Newspaper of the Year (up to 30,000 circulation) The Northern Advocate
- Weekly Newspaper of the Year Weekend Herald
- Community Newspaper of the Year North Shore Times
- Best Newspaper Design The New Zealand Herald
- Best Newspaper Inserted Magazine Time Out (The New Zealand Herald)
- Reporter of the Year Andrea Vance (Fairfax political bureau)
- Junior Reporter of the Year Sam Boyer (The Dominion Post)
- Regional/Community Reporter of the Year Sandra Conchie (Bay of Plenty Times)
- Reporter Politics Andrea Vance (Fairfax political bureau)
- Reporter Business Duncan Bridgeman (National Business Review)
- Reporter Crime and Justice Anna Leask (The New Zealand Herald)
- Reporter Health and Education David Fisher (The New Zealand Herald)
- Cartoonist of the Year Rod Emmerson (The New Zealand Herald)

== Cameron Slater controversy ==
In August 2014, following the publication of Nicky Hager's book Dirty Politics which alleged Cameron Slater's involvement with political impropriety, there were calls from online media for Slater's Canon Media Award for Best Blog to be withdrawn. However, the Newspaper Publishers' Association issued a statement saying that the award would not be withdrawn. NPA editorial director Rick Neville said "The only justification for even considering this would be if concrete evidence came forward of illegal or highly unethical methods having been used to obtain the Len Brown story. Nicky Hager has made a number of allegations but these are not the same as evidence or proof."
