= Murders of Ben Smart and Olivia Hope =

New Zealand murder case where no bodies were found

- Date: 1 January 1998
- Duration: Missing for 28 years, 10 months and 19 days
- Location: Endeavour Inlet, Marlborough Sounds, New Zealand; 41.093599°S 174.187584°E
- Type: Disappearance, presumed murder
- Deaths: Smart and Hope presumed dead in absentia
- Missing: Ben Smart, Olivia Hope
- Convicted: Scott Watson
- Trial: June to September 1999; Justice Dick Heron presiding
- Verdict: Guilty
- Convictions: Murder
- Sentence: Life imprisonment with the possibility of parole after 17 years

Ben Smart and Olivia Hope were young New Zealanders who disappeared in the early hours of the morning on New Year's Day, 1 January 1998. The two friends had been celebrating New Year's Eve at Furneaux Lodge in the Marlborough Sounds with other partygoers. The pair accepted an offer from a stranger to stay aboard his yacht in the early hours of the morning, and it was the last time they were seen alive. The disappearance of the duo sparked one of the most publicised and controversial investigations in New Zealand's history.

After a five-month investigation, the police arrested Scott Watson, a resident of Picton. The police were subsequently accused of manipulating the media to make Watson look guilty before they arrested him. Guy Wallace, who was a key witness, was presented with a photo montage that may have led to misidentification of Watson as a possible perpetrator. Scientific controversy, including the possibility of contamination, surrounded the analysis of two hairs found on Watson's boat.

The Crown called over 400 people to testify at the trial. Two prisoners testified that once Watson was on remand, he admitted to murdering Smart and Hope. Years later, one of them admitted he lied. The other was granted the use of a car and cellphone for his testimony by the police. The jury was unaware of this and Watson was found guilty of murder and sentenced to life imprisonment with a minimum non-parole period of seventeen years. Olivia Hope's father, Gerald Hope subsequently expressed concerns about the investigation and the trial, disclosing to investigative journalist, Mike White, that he felt "very uncomfortable about the way the Crown ran the case."

The police investigation and subsequent trial generated considerable media attention and public debate. Watson has maintained he is innocent and has filed several unsuccessful appeals. In June 2024, the Court of Appeal held a hearing at which additional evidence about the hairs and the photo montage was considered. In September 2025, the Court released its decision in which it declined to overturn Watson's conviction.

The case remains the subject of on-going speculation in New Zealand as a possible wrongful conviction and has been the subject of several books and documentaries.

== Disappearance of Smart and Hope ==
In December 1997, friends Ben Smart (aged 21) and Olivia Hope (17) celebrated New Year's Eve at Furneaux Lodge, located in the Endeavour Inlet of the Marlborough Sounds, with 1500–2000 other partygoers. Hope had travelled to the lodge with a group on a chartered yacht, Tamarack, while Smart had arrived separately. At around 4 a.m, as the celebrations wound down, the duo returned to the Tamarack, where they intended to sleep. When Hope and Smart found others had taken their booked place on the boat berths, they boarded a passing water-taxi driven by bartender Guy Wallace. At the time, Wallace had three other passengers on board: Hayden Morresey, Sarah Dyer, and an unidentified man who would become crucial to the police investigation. The unidentified man offered the pair a place to sleep on what he said was his yacht. Wallace let Smart and Hope off with this man at the yacht, and then dropped off the two other passengers at their bach. This was the last time Smart and Hope were seen alive.

== Police investigation ==
Ben Smart and Olivia Hope were reported missing on 2 January 1998. Initially the Blenheim police treated the investigation as a missing-persons case, but it soon became apparent that the disappearance was suspicious and out of character for the duo. Detective Inspector Rob Pope was appointed to take charge of the investigation on the 5th January and a mix of police staff from across the country joined the investigation, which became a homicide case code-named "Operation Tam" (short for Tamarack).

The investigation featured requests for information from the public, significant numbers of interviews across the country and months of extensive searches of the waters surrounding the Endeavour Inlet. Despite this, no bodies were ever found.

=== The focus on Guy Wallace ===
In his police statements on the third and fifth of January, Guy Wallace (the driver of the water taxi) described the unknown man with whom Hope and Smart left his water-taxi as having two days growth on his face, possibly arm tattoos, wiry build, 5'9", short dark wavy hair, being scruffy in appearance and wearing a Levi shirt with jeans. Wallace maintained that the man on his taxi was the same man he and other staff had served in the lounge bar earlier in the evening.

Wallace was subsequently shown two photographs of Watson in montages when he was interviewed by police on 9 January 1998 but he said he did not recognise anyone in the photographs. Police then changed the photo of Watson in the montage using a different one in which he had his eyes half closed. This became known as the 'blink photo'. On 20 April 1998, Wallace was shown a new montage, known as montage B, containing the blink photo. Not realising this was Watson, Wallace said this could be the 'mystery' man on the boat - but said that while "the eyes were the same as the man he had seen on the night, the hair of the man in photograph 3 was too short and his appearance was generally too 'tidy'."

After the trial, Wallace was adamant the police misled him over the photo and said he believed Watson was innocent and he had inadvertently contributed to the incarceration of an innocent man. He maintained this position in multiple interviews and in an affidavit until his death in March 2021. Roslyn (Roz) McNeilly, who was bar manager at Furneaux Lodge on New Year's Eve, also identified Watson from the blink photo in montage B. Once she saw a picture of Watson taken that night showing him to be clean shaven, she also recanted, and signed an affidavit stating she had made a mistake identifying him.

Wallace said he felt tremendous pressure from police and the media during the investigation. He was interrogated by the detectives from Christchurch CIB who initially suggested he was somehow responsible for the disappearance of the teenagers. As a result of accusations against him by the police, some locals began treating him with suspicion. People he knew began to think he was guilty and shunned him. He said that in the initial stages of the investigation, the police were desperate to arrest someone, and it could easily have been him: "I know in my heart of hearts, if he [Scott] wasn't in there, I'd be doing time. It's just that simple."

=== The mystery ketch ===
Wallace told police and the media that he had dropped Smart and Hope off at a wooden ketch (a boat with two masts). On 3 January 1998, Wallace drew a sketch for police of what he thought the boat he dropped the duo onto looked like. He drew a yacht with two masts and wrote "38-40 foot ketch?" on the drawing, underlining the word "ketch?" twice. He described the ketch as well-maintained, built of timber, with a thick blue stripe on the hull, and several round portholes with brass surrounds. He also said it was rafted in a group of between three and five other vessels.

Police seized Watson's sloop, Blade, on 12 January to the surprise of many following the case. Compared to descriptions of the mystery ketch, Blade was small, had a steel (not timber) hull, no portholes, no blue strip, and had only one mast. Police analysed thousands of photos taken on New Year's Eve and interviewed all of the boat skippers, but were unable to corroborate Wallace's reports of a ketch in the Endeavour Inlet that night, or find any of the "three to five" vessels it was rafted to. The prosecution at Watson's trial would later argue that Wallace had simply been mistaken about the second mast; Blade had been moored next to other boats, and the prosecution suggested that, from certain angles in the dark, the mast on one of these boats could have appeared to Wallace to be a second mast.

However, in the following weeks there were a number of sightings of a two-masted ketch in the Marlborough Sounds area reported to the police, including one account from a former police officer with 40 years' experience. A number of witnesses who came forward with sightings of a ketch were either told their information was not wanted, or their statements were not followed up. Former detective Mike Chappell, who worked on the case, later claimed officers were told not to follow up sightings of two-masted ketches.

=== The focus on Scott Watson ===
Later in the investigation, lead investigator Rob Pope would say that Watson "stood out like dog's balls" and "had the right sort of agenda and pedigree", apparently referring to his criminal record. Watson had 48 criminal convictions at the time, mainly from when he was a teenager for burglary, theft, cannabis offences, two counts of possessing an offensive weapon and one for assault when he was 16. Watson had been imprisoned for two short periods in 1989 and 1990, but had seemingly cleaned up his act in his 20's, having just one conviction in the eight years leading up to 1998.

Watson was being interviewed by Detective Tom Fitzgerald on 12 January when Police seized Blade and executed search warrants on the homes of his parents and sister. During the interview, one week into the investigation, Fitzgerald made it clear that police considered Watson their main suspect.

Rumours about the Watson family began to swirl in the small town of Picton, as well as in national media. Later, Watson would accuse police of influencing media coverage of the case, suggesting they leaked rumours to reporters that his family were criminals, that he was a guilty man and that he had an incestuous relationship with his sister. Gerald Hope, Olivia's father, also asserted that the police deliberately leaked details of Watson's criminal history and were responsible for the unsubstantiated suggestions of incest.

Watson also alleged that the police followed and intimidated members of his family. Police obtained warrants to tap the phone lines of Watson and his family from February until his arrest, in an investigation known as "Operation Celt". Police recorded 70-plus hours of conversations and during that time they regularly fed Watson's former girlfriend questions to ask hoping he would incriminate himself. Watson was described by a police representative as "smug" during these conversations, but never said anything to indicate he was involved.

=== Publicity during the investigation ===
Prior to his arrest, the media were free to report police comments and actions which demonstrated that Watson was the prime suspect without fear of jeopardising a fair trial. Watson was arrested on 15 June 1998, six months after his yacht had been pulled from the water in full view of bystanders and media. According to journalist Mike White, during this six-month period, police allowed unsubstantiated gossip about Watson's family to circulate, including rumours that Watson was sleeping with his sister. In an interview with Paul Henry, Mike White agreed that the media were manipulated and said: "I don't think the media asked enough questions. We were thinking that we had to support the police and we were doing the right thing by doing that."

Police denied starting these rumours, but Gerald Hope (Olivia's father), says the police constantly told him and his family how bad the Watsons were. Watson was advised by his lawyer not to speak publicly, so the media relied entirely on one-sided comments from the police and the victims' families. When interviewed by Mike White 18 years later, Watson said: "Every comment he'd made was reinterpreted to sound sinister, every action he'd taken was twisted to seem suspicious".

== Trial ==
The 11 week trial, which attracted considerable media attention, commenced on 10 June 1999 and concluded when the verdicts were delivered on 11 September 1999. The Crown called approximately 488 witnesses and the defence called 26.

The main plank of the Crown's case was that Watson invited Smart and Hope to sleep on his yacht in the early hours of 1 January 1998 – and that this was the last time they were seen. Another water-taxi driver, Don Anderson, testified that he dropped Watson at the Blade some time between 2–4 a.m. Some of the occupants of the neighboring boats, Mina Cornelia and Bianco, testified they were woken up by Watson in the early hours of the morning as he wanted to continue partying. Both the Crown and the defence agreed that this trip took place.

The Crown argued late in the trial that Watson returned to shore after Anderson dropped him off at the Blade, but could not say how. This became known as the "two-trip theory". The Crown argued it did not matter that the prosecution could not prove how Watson got back to shore, but said he must have done so because witnesses said he was involved in an altercation on shore, probably between 3–3.30 a.m.

The prosecution claimed the Blade left its mooring at Endeavour Inlet probably before 6 a.m. on New Year's Day with Ben and Olivia's bodies; that Watson dumped them into Cook Strait, returned to Erie Bay and lied about the time he arrived. A number of witnesses testified that they saw the boat at different times during the day. Another witness said the Blade arrived in Erie Bay shortly after 5 p.m. and that when it arrived, Watson was the only occupant.

Much of the Crown's case was circumstantial and largely relied on testimony from two prison informants, one of whom later admitted he lied, and the identification of Watson by Guy Wallace and Roz McNeilly – both of whom subsequently presented affidavits claiming the police had misled them. No fingerprints of the victims were found on Watson's boat. The only physical evidence produced at the trial related to some human hair found on Watson's boat, which was subject to DNA testing. The most damning testimony came from the two prison informants, described as Witness A & B.

=== The hair analysis ===
The crown claimed that during the police's forensic investigation of Blade, they found a blanket from which 390 human hairs were later recovered. Susan Vintiner, a forensic biologist testified in court that one hair was matched to Olivia Hope through DNA testing. Mitochondrial DNA analysis on the hairs was conducted in Australia and the United Kingdom. Police never received the level of validation they were seeking from these tests that the hairs belonged to Olivia, but still presented the results as evidence at Watson's trial.

Watson's counsel questioned the chain of custody regarding the hair, suggesting Vintiner may have mixed up the hair samples by examining known hair from Olivia on the same table and day as she examined the samples taken from Blade. They also pointed out there was a 1 cm hole in the evidence bag containing Olivia's hair which could add to the risk of contamination. Vintiner testified at the trial that cross contamination is an explanation that "needs to be considered". The accuracy of the hair testing has been questioned by other experts during appeals in the years following Watson's trial.

=== Prison witnesses A & B ===
A crucial aspect of the prosecution case came from two prisoners whose names were suppressed and were referred to as Witnesses A & B. They both claimed they met Watson in prison when he was on remand and said he told them he was responsible for Ben and Olivia's disappearance.

Despite his damning testimony, witness A subsequently admitted to a number of lawyers, and to the NZ Herald, that he lied in court. At the time he was receiving death threats from a gang member and was coming up for parole. Police visited him at least 10 times over a 12-month period leading up to the trial and pressured him into making false accusations in his testimony. Witness A said he "chose to help the police in the hope they would be able to save him".

Witness B said he and Watson interacted on numerous occasions and became good friends in Addington Prison. In fact, witness B was never in the same cell as Watson and "had little opportunity to develop any close relationship with Watson such that a confession might be made". It was later revealed that on his release from prison, this witness was granted the use of a car and cellphone for his testimony by the police.

Author John Goulter described the evidence of Witnesses A and B as a "bombshell" and said it had a dramatic impact on everyone in court.

=== Verdict ===
Watson was convicted of the murders in September 1999 after an eleven-week trial and sentenced to life imprisonment with a minimum non-parole period of seventeen years. Watson told the jury "You're wrong" when the verdict was read out in court and has continued to insist he is innocent since conviction.

=== Gerald Hope's perspective ===
In the years following the trial, Olivia Hope's father, Gerald Hope expressed concerns over the investigation and trial, telling journalist Mike White that he felt "very uncomfortable about the way the Crown ran the case". Olivia's sister, Amelia was called to testify at the trial about friendship rings she and Olivia had exchanged. The prosecutor continued questioning her until she broke down in tears. Gerald Hope said "It was pure theatre and the whole thing must have had a huge emotional effect on the jurors".

In December 2016, Mike White helped arrange two meetings between Scott Watson and Gerald Hope in Rolleston Prison. The meetings were opposed by the Department of Corrections and only took place after Watson requested a judicial review of the Corrections refusal. Each meeting lasted approximately three hours. During the interview, the pair discussed concerns they had over the investigation and trial, with Hope saying "We never got the truth. We haven't got the truth yet".

Hope said that when he confronted Watson over the pressing questions he had about his circumstances on January 1, he said Watson went silent or he found his answers unconvincing. However, Mike White who was present during the interview said: "I don't think there was anything that Scott Watson evaded, or didn't want to answer. He was very open." White added that Hope has had doubts about the case for a long time and that Hope rejects crucial evidence that led to Watson's conviction.

== Appeals ==
=== Early appeals ===
Watson appealed his conviction in the Court of Appeal in April and May 2000. Three Appeal Court judges heard submissions from both the defence and the prosecution, but decided there was no new evidence to recommend a second trial. They disregarded the defence's submission that the prosecution's so-called two-trip theory had appeared "out of the blue" late in the trial, stating "To prohibit the Crown from promoting a rational theory, for which there was supporting evidence, consistent with the whole nature and thrust of its case, would be a drastic step, and one to be taken only where the interests of justice would otherwise be in jeopardy.

In 2009, Watson applied to the Governor-General for a Royal Prerogative of Mercy. He sent a 22-page letter and enclosed a copy of Keith Hunter's book Trial by Trickery and documentary Murder on the Blade? The Ministry of Justice appointed Kristy McDonald, QC, to provide advice on the application. She produced two reports on the case in 2011 and 2013. McDonald, after considering the defence submission that “nearly all of the ‘threads’ of the Crown's circumstantial case have been undermined post trial”, concluded that the new evidence raised by the defence was not sufficiently "fresh, credible and cogent". As consequence she found "there is no reasonable prospect that the Court of Appeal would uphold an appeal”.

=== Complaint to the IPCA ===
In 2010 journalist Keith Hunter and Scott's father, Chris Watson, made a complaint to the Independent Police Conduct Authority about police conduct in the case. The complaint alleged that the head of the inquiry, Inspector Rob Pope, ignored relevant evidence, spread rumours about Scott Watson and his family, swore false affidavits to obtain search warrants; and that the police 'bought' or pressured two prisoners into telling lies in court and that they deliberately or accidentally contaminated the hair samples found in Watson's boat.

The report was highly critical of aspects of the investigation, led by present Deputy Commissioner Rob Pope. It states that the photograph montages used by police breached so many rules it "exposed the integrity of the investigation to justifiable criticism and to the drawing of inferences about intention and motivation". It also states that the police failed to pursue leads to find the "mystery ketch" seen by many witnesses — including some witnesses who believe they saw a woman who could be Olivia Hope aboard. The head of the IPCA, Justice Lowell Goddard said it was a difficult inquiry and "some actions of police fell short of best practice, and had the potential to influence witnesses".

=== Subsequent appeals ===
In November 2017, a second application for a Royal Prerogative of Mercy was filed on Watson's behalf by an Auckland man and ex-convict who had taken an interest in the Watson case. The application concerned the reliability of the evidence relating to two blonde hairs found on a blanket on Watson's boat. It included a report by forensic scientist Sean Doyle which questioned whether the hairs were really Hope's, and criticised the way the hair samples were handled at the time of the original trial. The application was denied.

In June 2020, it was reported that Watson's case would be referred back to the Court of Appeal because of continuing concern about the reliability of the forensic testing used to show the two hairs found on a blanket belonged to Olivia. In May 2022, the Court also agreed that when the hearing goes ahead, Watson would be allowed to challenge whether the controversial eyewitness evidence (related to the 'blink photo') was properly obtained and should have been heard by the jury at his trial.

==== Court of Appeal 2024 ====
Updated hair analysis: Watson's hearing at the Court of Appeal was delayed until June 2024. On 11 June, forensic scientists Paige McElhinney and Sean Doyle were questioned about the two blonde hairs linked to Olivia Hope that were found on a blanket on Watson's yacht. McElhinney said the hairs could have been taken on board the Blade by police by accident.

Forensic scientist Susan Vintiner, was questioned about the testimony she gave in Watson's 1999 trial. She did not know how the bag containing the hair was perforated, and agreed it was not possible to say how the hairs came to be transferred to Watson's boat. Vintiner also admitted that the initial search of the hairs from the blanket was done by a technician, not by her. Because she didn't mention the technician's involvement until more than 25 years had passed, this meant Watson's defence was never able to call the technician as a witness at his trial.

Prior to the appeal, the police tested another 30 more hairs using a new technique, hoping to strengthen their case against Watson. However, no DNA from Hope or Smart was found - and one of the 30 hairs came from a scientist at the Institute of Environmental Science and Research (ESR) who was involved with the testing. In other words, the sample was contaminated within the laboratory - validating a concern raised at the original trial.

The reliability of the eyewitnesses: At the hearing on 10 June, the defence argued that the "plastering" of Watson's face in the news media prior to his arrest for the murders may have influenced eyewitness descriptions of the suspect. Eyewitness identification experts, Dr. Gary Wells and Dr. Adele Quigley-McBride, were asked to evaluate the reliability of Guy Wallace's eyewitness identification evidence. Their opinion centered how Wallace's memory would have been affected by seeing Watson multiple times in the media and in police procedures, and how this would increase eyewitness errors. Dr. Wells said Wallace only "pointed the finger at Watson" after he was exposed to his photograph in the media. The only person Wallace actually remembered was someone with long, scraggly hair.

Crown lawyer Stuart Baker questioned Dr Wells about another water taxi passenger, Hayden Morrissey, who did not recognize Watson in the lineup shown to him, but also reported only seeing the mystery yacht owner from behind. Morrissey also said the man had long hair, whereas photographs of Watson on that night showed he had short hair.

The summing up: On 12 June 2024, Watson's lawyers argued that the two pieces of evidence which supposedly linked Watson to the murdered pair - Olivia Hope's two hairs and the eyewitness identification procedure - were so flawed, they should never have been put to the jury. They called for Watson's convictions to be overturned without a retrial. Crown lawyer Madeleine Laracy said the case did not rest on the two hairs and was aware there were significant challenges with Wallace's identification. She told the court the "totality and interlinking" of circumstantial evidence provided "overwhelming" evidence of Watson's guilt. Justice Christine French said that the Court of Appeal would take several months to reach a decision.

Decision: On 9 September 2025, the Court of Appeal declined to quash Watson's murder convictions. In a 291-page decision, the Court found there was no "Miscarriage of justice" in respect to the evidence relating to the hair evidence and Mr Wallace's evidence. It concluded that both items of evidence had been properly presented to the jury, subject to challenge by the defence, and that the trial judge had given the jury appropriate directions. In March 2026 the Supreme Court gave Watson leave to appeal in part, concerning only the reliability of Mr Wallace's evidence.

==== Supreme Court 2026 ====
The Supreme Court of New Zealand heard arguments by Watson's lawyers Nick Chisnall, Kerry Cook KC and the Crown during a two-day hearing between 20 and 21 October 2026. On the first day, Chisnall and Cook challenged the Court of Appeal 2025 decision to uphold Watson's conviction. His defence team argued that Police had "primed" their key witness water taxi driver Guy Wallace into identifying Watson. They also that the police identification process, montage photos and subsequent media coverage tainted the investigation and legal process, amounting to a miscarriage of justice that disqualified Watson's murder convictions.

On the second day, the Crown's Deputy Solicitor-General Madeline Laracy argued that the Crown's evidence against Watson was overwhelming even if Wallace's identification of Watson in a photo montage was excluded. Laracy also told the Supreme Court panel that the Court of Appeal had concluded that the Crown still had an overwhelming case against Watson even if Wallace's visual evidence was excluded. Crown counsel Stuart Baker also argued that the media coverage did not affect the outcome of Watson's trial. Following the submissions, the Supreme Court reserved their decision.

== Books, documentaries and media ==
In 2000, author John Goulter published a book about the investigation called Silent Evidence. The book included a foreword by lead investigator Rob Pope.

In 2001, Mike Kalaugher published The Marlborough Mystery in which he focused on purported mistakes in the police case concerning the location of the boat where the couple disembarked from the water taxi with the mystery man.

In 2003, journalist Keith Hunter produced a documentary called Murder on the Blade? about the case and questioning Watson's conviction. In a 2006, he published a follow-up book about the case, Trial by Trickery.

In a television documentary Doubt: The Scott Watson Case broadcast in 2016, Massey University law professor Chris Gallavin questioned whether Watson was proven guilty beyond reasonable doubt.

Journalist Ian Wishart wrote three books about the case. Ben and Olivia – What Really Happened?, Elementary and Elementary 2.0, in which he examines the investigation, questioning the actions of police and Watson's innocence respectively.

== Parole hearings ==
In June 2015, Watson attended parole for the first time. He has now appeared before the board four times and been declined parole on each occasion. When declining parole in 2016, the Board made it clear that it "does not determine questions of guilt or innocence. Nor do we act as some sort of Court of Appeal from decisions of the criminal justice system".

On this basis, the Board will not release Watson until he has had psychological treatment to address his risk of reoffending, which based on his murder convictions, has been assessed as high. In 2016, the Board noted that he still denies committing the murders, has refused to engage with Corrections Department psychologists, and so his risk of re-offending could not be treated.

Watson's fourth hearing was via video in May 2024. At that hearing, board chairman, Sir Ron Young, noted that each of three recent psychological reports available to the Board differed considerably when describing Watson's risk of reoffending. A report from November 2021 said he was at high to very high risk; a report done by a Corrections psychologist in September 2023 assessed him at medium risk. A more recent private psychological report assessed him as low risk of reoffending.

On 12 March 2025, Watson appeared before the Parole Board for a fifth time. The Board questioned four psychologists who had all provided different conclusions about his risk of reoffending. The hearing took longer than expected such that the board was unable to hear from Watson, his family and supporters, or final submissions from his lawyer, so the Board decided to abandon the hearing entirely. Instead, saying it would hold a two-day hearing at some point in the future.

Parole was again denied for a fifth time by the Parole Board 30 January 2026. Watson was assessed to continue posing an undue risk to society and not ready for release, relying on violence to solve personal issues. The Board agreed to seeing him in November 2026 the next time and ordered a further specialised assessment for treatment, especially around his attitudes to violence and to women. He will also be assessed for autism spectrum disorder and agreed to work on his safety plan.

On 19 November 2026, Watson was denied parole for a sixth time. The Parole Board deemed Watson to still pose an undue risk to the community after 27 years. They also accepted that he was in the reintegrative part of his sentence and scheduled a seventh hearing for July 2027. Watson's lawyer Kerry Cook KC had unsuccessfully argued that Watson had met the three safeguards for parole: namely parole conditions, the stability of the family address that Watson had been paroled to, and the "steadfast maintenance" of his innocence. Cook said that specialist reports including a neuropsychological assessment and risk evaluation indicated that Watson had a "low-to-moderate risk" of violence, had tested negative for drugs and had a minimum security classification.

== Other events ==
Watson married Coral Branch in Paremoremo Prison in 2004. They separated in 2007. At his parole hearing in 2020, the Board noted that he was supported by his partner of 16 years.

In 2007, Watson was found guilty by a magistrate of assaulting another inmate in Paparua Prison. In 2008, his appeal against that conviction failed.

== See also ==
- List of murder convictions without a body
- List of solved missing person cases
