= Guy Body =

New Zealand cartoonist

- Born: 1967 (age 58–59) Auckland, New Zealand
- Areas: cartoonist, illustrator
- Awards: 2012 Cartoonist of the Year, Canon Media Awards

Guy Keverne Body (born 1967) is a New Zealand cartoonist.

Born in Auckland, Body began drawing cartoons while at Takapuna Grammar School: "obscene versions of Sesame Street and The Wombles." At the start of his career, he was advised by the prominent New Zealand cartoonist Sir Gordon Minhinnick to "go somewhere and learn how to draw."` Since 1986 Body has worked in New Zealand and the United Kingdom as a newspaper artist and cartoonist, creating information graphics, graphs, and editorial cartoons in the New Zealand Truth, the Scotsman, the Auckland Star, and the New Zealand Herald. From 2004 he has been the backup editorial cartoonist for the Herald, preparing the Monday cartoon and substituting for Rod Emmerson when needed. He has also worked as a book illustrator.

After being a finalist in 1997 and 2009, he won Cartoonist of the Year at the 2012 Canon Media Awards.

On 30 May 2016, the Herald published Body's cartoon of Donald Trump, depicting the presidential candidate as King Kong climbing a building, with a character labelled "Uncle Sam" being asked “You do have a plan to shoot it if it gets dangerous, don’t you?". The cartoon was the subject of a complaint to the New Zealand Media Council, claiming it was "grossly offensive and went beyond satire and acceptable taste." The Council rejected the complaint, on the basis that "cartoons are regarded as opinion and are given wide license to challenge and confront".

In August 2018 Body created a political cartoon on free speech, commenting on visiting right-wing Canadian speakers Stefan Molyneux and Lauren Southern who were unable to secure a speaking venue. It went viral, being viewed over 550,000 times over four days. "If only I earned a dollar per click," Body lamented.

In 2022, Guy Body illustrated the children's book, 'The Great Kiwi Dream Trip' for author Graham Minhinnick.
