= Mike White (journalist) =

New Zealand journalist & author

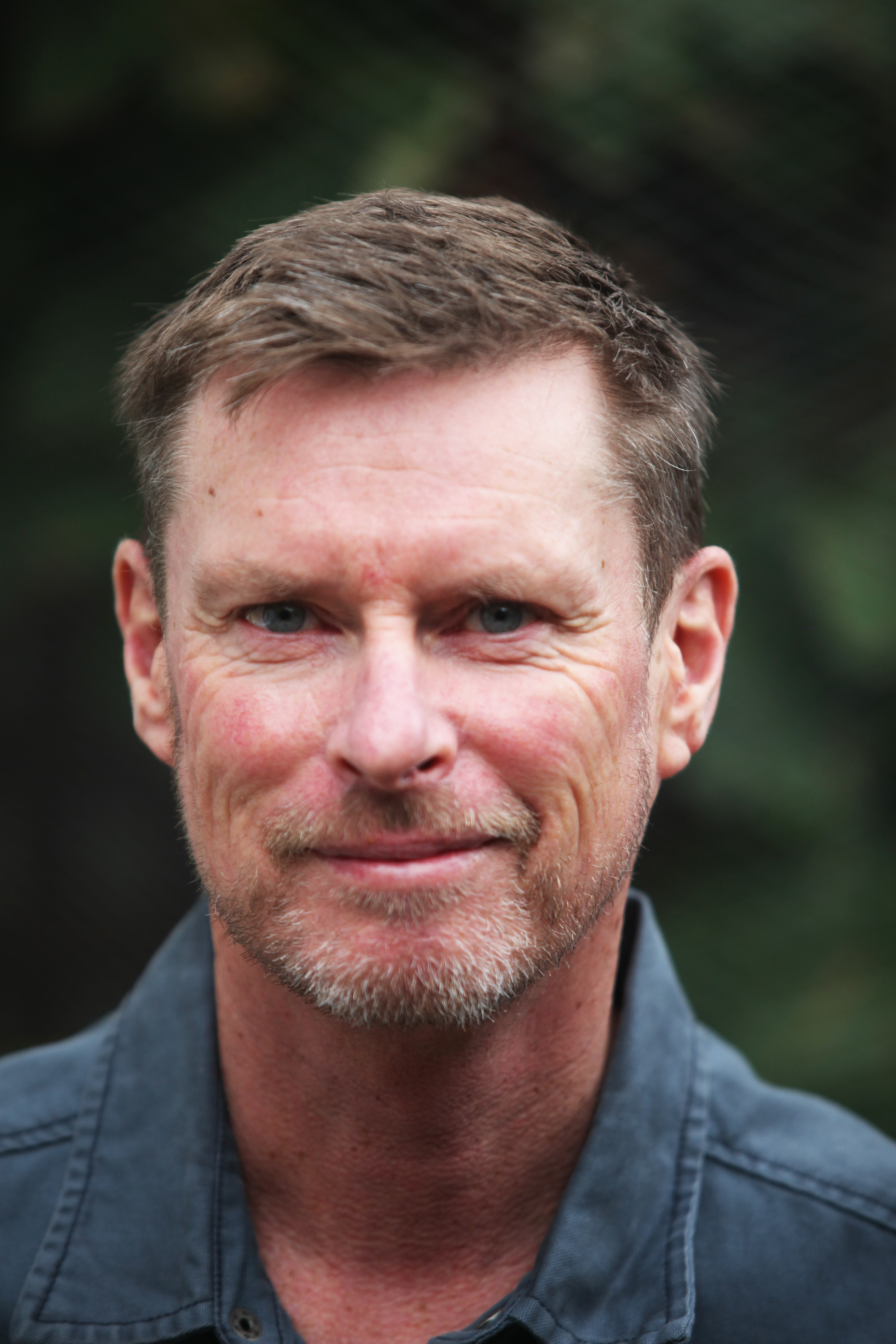
- White, 2016
- Occupation: Investigative journalist

Mike White is a New Zealand investigative journalist, photographer and author, and former foreign correspondent (Afghanistan, Pakistan and Iraq). He has written two books, one of them about dogs. He has also contributed to a third book with a chapter about New Zealand's experience with miscarriages of justice to an international analysis of the subject. He has won awards for his magazine articles on justice issues, specializing in wrongful convictions within New Zealand.

He is also an awarded travel writer. White has won New Zealand Feature Writer of the Year (Qantas/Canon/Voyager Media Awards) four times, and a Wolfson Fellowship to the University of Cambridge. He has also won the Cathay Pacific New Zealand Travel Writer of the Year title three times.

== Early life and education ==
White grew up near Blenheim, and graduated with a political science and history degree from the University of Canterbury in the mid-1980s. In 1996, he graduated from the Wellington Polytechnic (now Massey University) School of Journalism.

== Career ==
After six years working as reporter and chief reporter for the Marlborough Express in Blenheim, he left to work as a foreign correspondent in Afghanistan, Pakistan and Iraq.

In 2003 White returned to New Zealand to write full-time for North & South, a current affairs monthly magazine, becoming a senior staff writer. He was a senior writer for the magazine for seventeen years. He is now a senior writer for Stuff, and is based in Wellington.

In 2016 White and his long time partner, Wellington journalist Nikki Macdonald, took over the editing of long-form journalism website Featured.

== Wrongful convictions in New Zealand ==
Writing for North & South and then for Stuff (website), White has focussed most of his attention on high-profile convictions that have eventually been declared miscarriages of justice. This includes: Arthur Allan Thomas 1970, David Bain 1994, Aaron Farmer 2003, Peter Ellis 1986–1992, Alan Hall 1986, Teina Pora 1992, David Dougherty 1992, Stephen Stone & Gail Maney 1989, and David Lyttle 2011. In 2023, White published Murder, Wrongful Conviction and the Law, which analysed miscarriages of justice in multiple jurisdictions, including New Zealand.

== Other high profile cases ==
=== Scott Watson ===
White covered the Ben Smart and Olivia Hope/Scott Watson case as a reporter on the Marlborough Express from 1998; he revisited the case for North & South in December 2007. In 2014 Scott Watson invited White to interview him in prison, having maintained his innocence for 18 years. The Department of Corrections sought to prevent that meeting. It took more than a year and a hearing in the High Court to overturn that decision. White described the widely reported verdict as a "win for journalism".

White's story on the interview with Watson in Rolleston Prison was published in North & South in December 2015. In November 2016, after again taking the Corrections Department to the High Court, he covered the first meeting between Scott Watson and Olivia's father, Gerald Hope, also held in Rolleston Prison.

=== Mark Lundy ===
White has also written extensively on the Lundy case. In 2015 he spent two months in Courtroom One at Wellington's High Court, covering the retrial of Mark Lundy for North & South. It's a case he had been following for seven years. His 18-page story: The Lundy Murders: What the Jury Didn’t Hear, in North & South's February 2009 issue, led to international lawyers and experts joining Lundy's team and eventually having his conviction quashed by the Privy Council in 2013. White's story on Lundy's retrial and reconviction was published in May 2015. He examined whether juries are equipped to cope with complex, controversial forensic evidence and cast doubt on the validity of the verdict.

== Related issues ==
=== Criminal case review commission ===
Based on his extensive knowledge and experience of miscarriages of justice in New Zealand, in Long Walk to Justice, an eight-page article in North & South in 2015, White asked if New Zealand needed an independent commission to investigate wrongful convictions. He researched how the Commission in the UK dealt with such cases during his Wolfson Press Fellowship to the University of Cambridge. In Justice at last on Stuff in 2020, he described the establishment of the Criminal Cases Review Commission by the Labour Government, and the resistance of previous administrations to set up such a body.

The commission can compel Government agencies to provide documents and give evidence to their investigators. It can also highlight problems with the police and prosecution system which have repeatedly been shown to contribute to wrongful convictions. One of those problems is the continuing use of prison snitches in high-profile murder cases.

=== Prison snitches ===
Writing for Stuff in 2021, White discussed guidelines and recommendations issued by the Solicitor-General regarding the use of prison witnesses in court – colloquially known as 'jailhouse snitches'. He noted that historically, very few high-profile cases have been prosecuted in new Zealand without a 'snitch' testifying in court that the accused had confessed to them while they were in prison; it was a contributing factor in the murder trials of Arthur Allan Thomas, Mark Lundy, Scott Watson, Teina Pora and David Tamihere.

By testifying against a fellow prisoner, the police may offer a 'snitch' potential benefits such a reduced jail sentence, a letter of support to the judge or the Parole Board, and even financial rewards up to $50,000 – plus name suppression. International research has found that testimony from prison witnesses is generally unreliable and one of the leading causes of wrongful convictions.

== Awards ==
- 1997 Qantas Media Awards Student Journalist of the Year.
- 2004 Qantas Media Awards: Environment & Conservation (best feature)
- 2004 Citigroup Journalism Awards for Excellence: General Business Category Winner
- 2005 Qantas Media Awards Government, Diplomacy and Foreign Affairs Winner
- 2005 Qantas Media Awards Science and Technology Winner
- 2006 Cathay Pacific Travel Media Awards Best Magazine Travel Story
- 2006 Cathay Pacific Travel Media Awards Travel Writer of The Year.
- 2007 Qantas Media Awards Magazine Feature Writer of the Year
- 2007 Qantas Media Awards Crime & Justice
- 2007 Qantas Media Awards Science & Technology
- 2008 MPA Awards Journalist of the Year Supreme Winner & Current Affairs Winner
- 2008 Qantas Media Awards Best Columnist Sport & Racing
- 2008 Qantas Media Awards Crime & Justice
- 2009 Qantas Media Awards Technology & Science, Device Technologies Award
- 2010 Cathay Pacific Travel Awards Heritage Hotels Award for the Best Travel Article Written About New Zealand
- 2010 Qantas Media Awards Best Profile
- 2011 Canon Media Awards Feature Writer Science/environment
- 2012 Cathay Pacific Travel Awards: Heritage Hotels Award for the Best Travel Story about New Zealand
- 2013 Canon Media Awards Magazine Feature Writer of the Year
- 2013 Canon Media Awards Magazine Feature Writer Politics
- 2013 Canon Media Awards Magazine Feature Writer Arts and Entertainment
- 2013 Cathay Pacific Travel Awards Heritage Hotels Award for the Best Travel Story about New Zealand
- 2013 Cathay Pacific Travel Awards NZ Maori Tourism Award for the Best Travel Story about a Maori Tourism Experience
- 2014 Canon Media Awards Magazine Feature Writer, Science and Environment
- 2013 Wolfson Fellowship to the University of Cambridge
- 2014 Cathay Pacific Travel Awards Heritage Hotels Award for the Best Travel Story about New Zealand Winner
- 2015 Cathay Pacific Travel Media Awards NZ Maori Tourism Award for the Best Travel Story about a Maori Tourism Experience
- 2015 Canon Media Awards Magazine Feature Writer Arts and Entertainment
- 2016 Canon Media Awards Feature Writer of the Year
- 2016 Canon Media Awards Feature Writer Crime & Justice
- 2018 Voyager Media Awards Feature Writer Crime, Justice and Social Issues
- 2020 Voyager Media Awards: Travel Writer of the Year, Feature Writer, Crime and Justice
- 2021 Voyager Media Awards: Feature Writer, Crime and Justice, Feature Writer of the Year
- 2023 Voyager Media Awards: Feature Writer, Crime and Justice
- 2024 Voyager Media Awards: Sports Journalist of the Year, Gordon McLauchlan Journalism Award

== Books ==
- 2015 Who Killed Scott Guy? Allen & Unwin. ISBN 9781877505478
- 2019 How to Walk a Dog, Allen & Unwin. ISBN 9781988547206
- 2023 Chapter about New Zealand in Murder, Wrongful Conviction and the Law, Jon Robins, Routledge. ISBN 9781003251484
