= Rebecca Macfie =

New Zealand author and journalist

- Born: 1960 or 1961 (age 65–66)
- Education: University of Otago, University of Canterbury
- Occupations: Journalist, author
- Writing career
- Notable works: Tragedy at Pike River Mine: How and Why 29 Men Died; Helen Kelly: Her Life
- Notable awards: NZSA E.H. McCormick Best First Book Award for Non-Fiction, Bert Roth Award for Excellence in Labour History
- Website: Official Twitter

Rebecca Macfie is a New Zealand author and journalist.

== Early life and family ==
Rebecca Macfie is the fifth of six children born to Bob and Helen Macfie and raised on the family farm in South Otago, which had been awarded to Bob after his A-grade discharge from military service at the conclusion of World War II.

Macfie studied history at the University of Otago and earned a Bachelor of Arts and Postgraduate Diploma in Arts. Later she graduated from the University of Canterbury with a Postgraduate Diploma in Journalism.

Since the late 1980s, she has lived in Christchurch, New Zealand, with her husband, engineer Neil Smart. They share two adult children.

== Career ==
Macfie has worked as a journalist since 1988. In 2007 Macfie joined the New Zealand Listener as a writer for the South Island. She has also been published with The Star, The Press, National Business Review, Independent Business Weekly, North & South, Unlimited, and the New Zealand Herald.

In 2013 she published Tragedy at Pike River Mine: How and Why 29 Men Died, a non-fiction work on the Pike River Mine disaster that claimed 29 lives. In 2022, her biography of trade unionist Helen Kelly was published by Awa Press and long-listed for the New Zealand Book Awards general non-fiction award.

In 2024 she was named the JD Stout Fellow by the Stout Research Centre for New Zealand Studies at Victoria University of Wellington.

== Awards ==
For her work with the New Zealand Listener, Macfie won the Magazine Feature Writer Business and Politics Award at the 2014 Canon Media Awards and the Magazine Feature Writer Business & Science Award at the 2013 Canon Media Awards. At the 2016 Canon Media Awards, Macfie won the 'Feature writing – politics' and 'Feature writing – health' categories, as well as the Wolfson Fellowship. In 2018, Macfie won the Voyager Media Award for 'Feature writing – business or personal finance' for two articles, on the environmental and economic risks of climate change, and the development of animal free protein.

In 2012 she won the Bruce Jesson Senior Journalism Grant to develop a book on the Pike River Mine disaster (later published as Tragedy at Pike River Mine). The book then won the 2014 NZSA E.H. McCormick Best First Book Award for Non-Fiction at the New Zealand Post Book Awards, the 2014 Bert Roth Award for Excellence in Labour History, and the Australasian Institute of Mining and Metallurgy media award.
