= Melissa Williams (historian) =

New Zealand author

Melissa Matutina Williams is a historian, author and academic in the field of indigenous studies. She has contributed research about the urbanisation of Māori in New Zealand that started in the 1960s.

== Early life and education ==
Williams was born in Auckland, and affiliates to the Māori nations of Te Rarawa and Ngāti Maru. When she was 13 years old, she went to Panguru, a settlement in the northern Hokianga in Northland, where she lived with her grandmother.

Williams has qualifications from the University of Auckland. She completed Bachelor of Arts degrees in sociology and history, the latter with first-class honours. She went on to earn a Master of Arts degree with first-class honours in history, and a PhD in history. Her doctoral thesis was titled Back-home and home in the city: Māori migrations from Panguru to Auckland, 1930–1970.

== Career ==
Since 2013, Williams has held a lecturer position at the University of Auckland.

Her published book Panguru and the City: Kāinga Tahi, Kāinga Rua: An Urban Migration History (2015) highlights stories of Māori urbanisation the mostly unknown about 'dynamic Māori community sites' that were built from people who migrated from their home areas to the cities from the 1960s. Reviewer Coll Thrush praises the book saying, "the fertile intersections between past and present and between the urban and the Indigenous shape this important work, which should take its place among the best scholarship on urban Indigeneities." Williams' book, Panguru and the City: Kāinga Tahi, Kāinga Rua: An Urban Migration History, published in 2015, was listed in Books of Mana as one of the 180 most significant works of Māori-authored non-fiction.

Williams and Aroha Harris collaborated on the book Te Ao Hurihuri : The Changing World, 1920–2014 (2018). Williams and Harris received a Marsden grant about how Māori held onto their aspirations for a healthy family while encountering state welfare policies.

== Selected publications ==
- Melissa Matutina Williams (2010). Back-home and home in the city : Māori migrations from Panguru to Auckland, 1930–1970 (Doctor of Philosophy thesis). University of Auckland. hdl:2292/52307. Wikidata Q112885087.
- Melissa Matutina Williams (2015), Panguru and the City: Kāinga Tahi, Kāinga Rua: An Urban Migration History, OL 23397622W, Wikidata Q125688184
- Aroha Harris; Melissa Matutina Williams; Atholl Anderson (2017). Tangata whenua: an illustrated history. Part three.: Te Ao Hurihuri: the changing world, 1920–2014. Wellington: Bridget Williams Books. ISBN 978-1-988533-45-2. OCLC 1108077788. Wikidata Q105037712.

== Awards ==
- Post-Doctoral Research Award – Kate Edger Educational Charitable Trust / Dame Joan Metge
- Copyright Licensing New Zealand Writers’ Award
- E.H. McCormick Best First Book Award, Ockham New Zealand Book Awards (2016) for Panguru and the City: Kāinga Tahi, Kāinga Rua: An Urban Migration History
- Bert Roth Award (2016)
