= Bert Roth =

New Zealand socialist and historian (1917–1994)

Herbert Otto Roth (7 December 1917 – 27 May 1994) was a notable New Zealand socialist, labourer, librarian and historian. He was born in Vienna, Austria in 1917. In Austria, he was known as "Otti" but in New Zealand he was known as "Bert".

Roth was the leader of the Red Falcons in Austria. He fled from there to avoid conscription after having sworn an allegiance to Adolf Hitler. He then lived in Grenoble, where he was later imprisoned as an enemy alien. His mother managed to organise a permit for him to emigrate to New Zealand, and he arrived in Wellington in April 1940. He immediately became politically active in left-wing circles, but was forbidden by the Department of Justice to take on official positions, as he was classed as an enemy alien. Roth applied for naturalisation in 1944, and was granted citizenship in March 1946.

Roth joined the Air Force and this allowed him to study towards a Bachelor of Arts degree at Victoria University College. After attending the New Zealand Library School, he worked for the National Library Service in Wellington. He was later the president of the New Zealand Library Association. In January 1962, he started work for the University of Auckland Library. He retired in 1983.

He married Margaret (Margot) Frances Hogben on 29 November 1946. She was a journalist, and the granddaughter of George Hogben, the seismologist. Roth's first book was a biography him. After that, Roth mostly wrote about labour history. His most important work is Trade unions in New Zealand past and present, which was published in 1973. He was a major collector of union and labour publications, and his collection is today a major resource for the Alexander Turnbull Library.

He died at his home in Mount Eden on 27 May 1994. He was survived by his divorced wife, two sons and a daughter.

In recognition of Roth's contribution to labour movement archives and history, the Bert Roth Award for Labour History was created by the Labour History Project in May 2013. It is awarded annually to the best work in the field of labour history published in the previous calendar year.

== See also ==
- Socialism in New Zealand
