= Active 24 =

European Internet hosting company

- Founded: 1998
- Founder: Rolf Larsen
- Headquarters: Oslo, Norway
- Services: Internet hosting services
- Parent: Visma
- Website: www.active24.cz

Active 24 is an independent pan-European provider of Internet hosting services. The company focuses on providing small and medium-sized companies (SMEs) and private individuals with hosted solutions that combine scalable and standardised products.

Founded in Oslo, Norway in 1998 as Active ISP, the company has since then grown steadily and been a consolidator in the market by acquiring Carambole, Millenicum and Loopia in Sweden, Ladot in the Netherlands, VI in UK, Globe Internet, Internet Club and CP Online in the Czech Republic, and Cybernetix in Poland to its portfolio.

In the summer of 2006, Active 24 was acquired by Mamut ASA and became a part of the Norwegian software company. In 2011, Mamut was acquired by Visma, the acquisition resulted in Active 24 becoming a standalone division within the Visma group. The group comprises six business areas, Visma BPO Accounting and Payroll, Visma Software, Visma Commerce Solutions, Visma Retail, Visma Projects and Consulting and Hosting.

Active 24 are operational in 12 markets across Europe; Norway, Sweden, Denmark, Finland, Austria, Germany, France, United Kingdom, Netherlands, Czech Republic, Poland and Serbia.
