= Ian F. Grant =

New Zealander historian

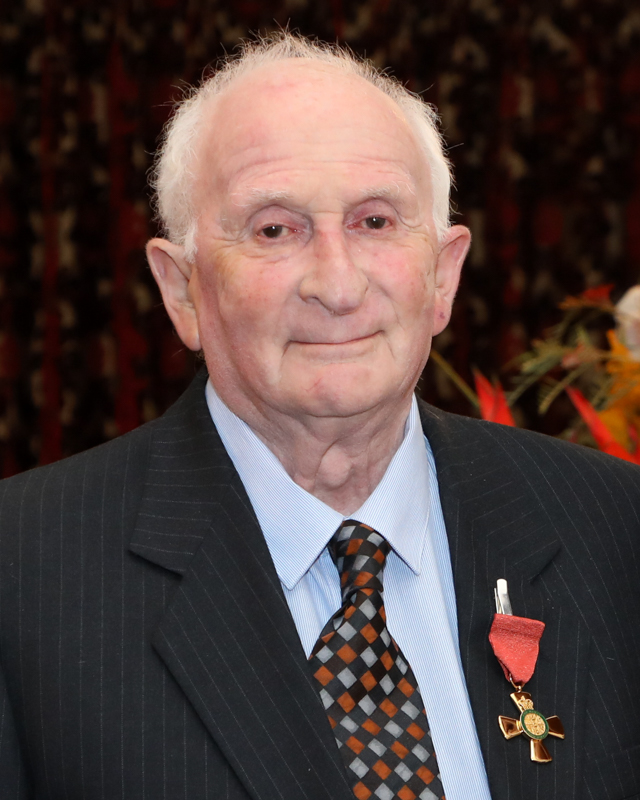
Grant in 2025

Ian Fraser Grant ONZM (born 15 March 1940) is a New Zealand historian, writer, editor and publisher. He founded the New Zealand Cartoon Archive in 1992 and has written widely on the history of cartooning in New Zealand.

== Biography ==
Grant was born in Wellington and educated at Wellesley College, Scots College, and Victoria, University of Wellington.

He has had a varied career in journalism and advertising, beginning with the role of Salient editor in 1960. He was a founding editorial and marketing director of Fourth Estate Limited, publishers of the National Business Review, from 1970, the founder and founding editor of NBR Marketplace (from 1972) and founding director of NBR Books. He has also worked in a number of roles in the book publishing industry.

He co-founded Fraser Books, a publishing partnership, with his wife Diane Grant in 1984.

Grant has written a number of book and articles on the history of New Zealand cartooning, beginning with The Unauthorized Version: A Cartoon History of New Zealand in 1980. This interest led him to found the New Zealand Cartoon Archive at the National Library of New Zealand in 1992 (later expanded to become the New Zealand Cartoon and Comics Archive in 2019). He chaired the Archive's various governing bodies between 1992 and 2019.

Grant held residencies at the Stout Centre for New Zealand Studies in 2007, 2009 and 2010 and became an Adjunct Research Associate at the Centre in 2012. He became the Alexander Turnbull Library's first Adjunct Scholar in 2014. He received the Outstanding Achievement Award at the New Zealand Media Awards in 2012 and in 2017 he accepted the same award on behalf of the New Zealand Cartoon Archive.

In 2018, Grant published Lasting Impressions: the story of New Zealand's Newspapers, 1840-1920, the first comprehensive history of New Zealand newspapers published since Guy Scholefield's Newspapers in New Zealand was published in 1958. The New Zealand Review of Books described Lasting Impressions as "a compelling, often delightful read, and a truly magnificent addition to the scholarship of journalism here". The second volume, Pressing On: the story of New Zealand's newspapers, 1921-2000 was published in 2024.

In the 2024 King’s Birthday Honours, Grant was appointed an Officer of the New Zealand Order of Merit, for services to literature and historical preservation.

== Bibliography ==
=== Books ===
- Bali: Morning of the World (with Hubert Sieben), Reed, 1970.
- Journey Through a Landscape (with Don Neilson), Reed, 1976.
- Inside Down Under (with Bob Brockie), Fourth Estate Books, 1976
- The Unauthorized Version: A Cartoon History of New Zealand, Cassell, 1980, revised edition Bateman, 1987.
- Drawing the Line: Cartoons across the Tasman, Ministry of External Relations and Trade, 1989.
- Out Of The Woods: the Restructuring and Sale of New Zealand’s State Forests, (with Reg Birchfield), Profile Books, 1993.
- North of the Waingawa: Masterton Borough and County Councils 1877-1989, MDC, 1995.
- The Smallfarming Revolution: New Beginnings in Rural New Zealand (with Diane Grant), Viking, 1998
- False Prophets: A Light Roasting of New Zealand’s Sacred Cows, Profile Books,1998.
- Wairarapa (with Grant Sheehan), Phantom House Books, 2000.
- The Other Side Of the Ditch: A Cartoon Century in the New Zealand-Australia Relationship, New Zealand Cartoon Archive, 2001.
- Public Lives: New Zealand Premiers and Prime Ministers, New Zealand Cartoon Archive, 2003.
- The Look of Greytown (with Chris Slater), Wairarapa Archive, 2004.
- Between the Lines: A Cartoon Century of New Zealand Political and Social History, 1906-2005, New Zealand Cartoon Archive, 2005
- The Smallfarming Life: New Zealand’s smallfarming movement 1977-2006, New Zealand Association of Smallfarmers, 2006.
- Having a Ball: A Cartoon History of New Zealand Rugby, New Zealand Cartoon Archive, 2011.
- Lasting Impressions: The Story of New Zealand Newspapers, 1840-1920, Fraser Books/Alexander Turnbull Library, 2018.
- Pressing On: The Story of New Zealand Newspapers, 1921-2000, Fraser Books/Alexander Turnbull Library, 2024.

=== Book chapters ===
- ‘Political Satire’, pp 204–05 in A Book of New Zealand, ed .J C Reid and Peter Cape, Collins, 1979.
- ‘Economists’, ‘Academics’, pp 163–68 in The Acid Test: An Anthology of New Zealand humorous writing, ed. Gordon McLauchlan, Methuen, 1981.
- ‘In-depth Reporting’ (with Bob Edlin), pp 197–200, ‘Ethical Issues and Public Relations’ (with Klaus Sorensen), pp 201–09, in Business Reporting: A New Zealand Guide to Financial Journalism, New Zealand Journalists’ Training Organisation, 1997.
- ‘Business ethics: is amoral good enough?’, pp 101–11 in Business Ethics in Theory and Practice, Kluwer Academic Publishers, 1999.
- ‘A Cartoon Perspective on a Century in Australia-New Zealand Relations’, pp 131–50 in States of Mind: Australia and New Zealand 1901-2001, Institute of Policy Studies, 2002.
- ‘A More Black Than White Image: Muldoon and the Cartoonists’, pp 233–242 in Muldoon After Gustafson, Dunmore Press, 2004.
- ‘Lange takes the high ground’, pp190–98 in For the Record: Lange and the Fourth Labour Government, Dunmore Press, 2005.
- ‘Agents of Prosperity: Building an Advertising Industry’, pp 26–35 in Promoting Prosperity: The Art of Early New Zealand Advertising, Craig Potton Publishing, 2013.
- ‘War a Daily Reminder, But Life Goes On: Newspapers during the First World War’, pp 127–141 in New Zealand Society at War 1914-1918, Victoria University Press 2016.
- ‘Cartoonists and the 2017 Election’ (with Hannah Benbow), pp. 137–59, in Stardust & Substance: The New Zealand General Election of 2017, Victoria University Press, 2018.
