= Anna Crichton =

New Zealand illustrator

Anna Crichton (born 1957) is a New Zealand illustrator, cartoonist and ceramicist. Her work has been published in The New York Times, The Wall Street Journal, and Time magazine.

== Education ==
Crichton studied a Bachelor of Design at Wellington Polytechnic, graduating in 1981, although another source gives 1977 as her date of graduation.

== Career ==
She started her career at the Dominion, before working as art director for the Listener, 1981–1984. She then traveled internationally, working variously as an art director or contributor to Sawasdee, Asian Advertising and Marketing, New York Times, Wall St Journal and Time magazine. Between 1993 and 1996, she was an illustrator, cartoonist and caricaturist for The Australian. In 1999, she described The Australian as "the most inspiring place I'd ever worked. I was surrounded by some pretty talented artists".

Between 2003 and 2011, she taught 'media design/conceptual thought/typography/publication design/illustration/composition' at Auckland University of Technology and Unitec.

== Awards ==
Crichton has won 5 Canon Media Awards for her work (from 2018, known as the Voyager Media Awards).

== Personal life ==
Crichton has two children, Eva and Reuben. She describes herself as "an adventurer, a bargain hunter; as canny, lucky, bold and a risk taker".
