= Tim Bickerstaff =

New Zealand radio broadcaster (1942–2009)

Timothy John Bickerstaff (28 November 1942 – 31 October 2009) was a New Zealand radio talkback host, sports broadcaster, newspaper columnist, and author who pioneered talkback radio in New Zealand. Over nearly 40 years (1960–1997) he honed a reputation as New Zealand's version of Australia's Derryn Hinch or US "shock jock" Howard Stern.

== Early years ==
Bickerstaff was born in Napier, New Zealand, one of two sons to Patricia Kathleen Bickerstaff (née Stevens) and George Ian Bickerstaff, (known as Ian). His father was a public accountant and sportsman who was at Napier Boys' High School when the Napier earthquake struck on 3 February 1931.

=== Parents divorce ===
Bickerstaff's parents divorced while he was a pre-schooler and he and his brother Dale stayed with extended family until his father remarried Mary Patricia Jaffray (known as Molly).

His childhood was not particularly happy.

After his parents' separation, he did not see his mother again until he was an adult and did not get on with his step-mother.

=== Childhood recollections ===
In a chapter titled Good Keen Man in a Michael King edited book, One of the Boys? Changing Views of Masculinity in New Zealand, he recalled his parents were very social and he and his brother felt they did not "figure in the scheme of things."

=== Relationship with father ===
His father was an ambitious man who was proud of his own record as a sprinter and pushed his sons to compete and win.

When Ian Bickerstaff stopped competing himself, he became active as a sports administrator and young Tim was drawn into a passion for sport at an early age. As a teenager Bickerstaff junior won the New Zealand junior hammer throw event but he did not enjoy "feeling like a trophy" his father showed off, and was not sorry when a knee injury ended his short athletics career.

"I tried to protect myself from the shining light and built a barrier between me and the world."

Bickerstaff did not thrive at school but became fascinated with sports and became a walking encyclopaedia of sporting general knowledge.

Towards the end of his schooling the family moved to Rotorua, and it was there in 1960 that Bickerstaff got his first job in broadcasting.

== Radio and television career ==
=== NZBC years ===
He began as a radio sports reporter with the New Zealand Broadcasting Service in Rotorua, and spent seven years compiling radio and television shows for the service in Wellington, Dunedin, and Auckland. Bickerstaff was never a good "fit" for the conservative government-owned networks, and just as he'd been a rebel at school, he did not quietly accept "the rules."

Rob Crabtree worked with Bickerstaff as one of the sports reporters for the New Zealand Broadcasting Corporation (NZBC) at Broadcasting House, Wellington, in 1964–65.

He recalled Tim was always larger-than-life and no respecter of authority. He spent his lunchtimes beating all comers at table tennis and letting everyone hear his opinions on the world, "whether they wanted to or not."

Radio talkback hadn't started in those days, but Tim was obviously headed in that direction, he said.

From Wellington, he was appointed to Dunedin's 4ZB to work with legendary sports broadcaster Peter (PHJ) Sellers.

=== Melbourne ===
In 1967 he headed to Australia, where he worked in both radio and television, with 3DB and Channel 7 in Melbourne.

Journalist Phil Gifford, a fellow sports specialist, said the Broadcasting Corporation style of "the BBC crossed with a conservative insurance office" was never going to suit Bickerstaff's volcanic personality, and when he returned to New Zealand from Australia he was ready for something different.

"At the NZBC his most memorable moment was the time during the Saturday night television news when the camera panned down to reveal he was reading results directly from the 8 O'Clock sports newspaper".

When he returned to Auckland in 1970 he took up a job as a sports editor at Radio I, a private radio station.

=== Sportsline with Geoff Sinclair ===
With his passion for sports and a prodigious memory for sports trivia, he pioneered talkback on Sportsline with Geoff Sinclair on Radio I. The show attracted more than a third of the listening audience at its peak, and was arguably one of the most successful sports shows in New Zealand radio history. Phil Gifford said Tim Bickerstaff didn't just blaze a trail in sports talk on radio in New Zealand as much as "dynamite the landscape, and change it forever."

New Zealand radio listeners had heard nothing like it. Said Radio Broadcasters Association Chief Executive Bill Francis:

"The combination of Sinclair and Tim Bickerstaff on Radio 'I's' Sportsline, was a must-listen in the 1970s – full of cheek, outrageous behaviour and constant questioning of players, and most of all, the way sport was administered. Gone were the days of radio sports hosts acting as cheerleaders".

He earned notoriety for the on-air Punch a Pom a Day campaign he initiated when All Black Keith Murdoch was controversially sent home from a British tour in 1972. The campaign, which included bumper stickers and jokes at the expense of the British, resulted in assaults on those who were British, or even perceived as British, his Mercedes Benz being vandalised with a crowbar and a car dealer who sponsored his show having 40 tyres slashed in his yard.

The Bickerstaff -Sinclair match-up, said New Zealand Herald sports writer Chris Rattue, formed the finest radio double act New Zealand has produced. Their show was compulsory listening in his schooldays in the 1970s, as they made a wonderful chalk-and-cheese team, full of humour and irreverence.

He suggested it was a golden period for radio, as private companies changed the airwaves, thanks to deregulation. Sinclair was supposed to be the bad cop and Bickerstaff the good when they first went to air, but the roles were reversed at Bickerstaff's instigation.

"There has never been a pairing to match the warm, working-class Sinclair and controversial stirrer Bickerstaff. Their notables included introducing the Mad Butcher, Peter Leitch, to the city. Sinclair and Bickerstaff not only understood what made Auckland sport tick, they helped make it tick."

As Gifford noted in the Sunday Star Times the inner rogue was always near the surface with Tim. I"

=== Radio Pacific Talkback ===
By 1979 Bickerstaff moved to Radio Pacific and filled a solo two-hour slot that combined sport with more general interest interviews, which ultimately added up to wide-ranging talks with 2000 of the world's leading personalities – in and out of sport.

Beginning with world champion mile athlete John (now Sir John) Walker, they included Glen Campbell (singer), Mickey Rooney (actor) Billy Connelly (comedian), Ruth Westheimer (sexologist), Jack Nicklaus (golfer), Jean Houston, (psychologist) Jackie Collins (author), and Xavier Hollander (porn actress).

One he most admired was someone many would not have even heard of, the blind athlete Craig MacFarlane. When interviewing high-profile real estate auctioneer Dick Gladding 'live' on air on 15 June 1989, Tim asked Gladding if his agency used "ring-ins" to boost the bidding. Gladding replied, "Tim, I feel sick". To which Tim replied, "I thought you would say that". There was a long silent pause and Tim looked at Gladding. He had suffered a heart attack and was dead in the studio chair. (This was believed to be the first time in the history of world radio that this had ever happened.)

These interviews revealed a different side to a broadcaster who'd become notorious for stirring controversy. Said journalist Phil Gifford:

Bickerstaff was praised by fellow broadcaster Gifford for his sharp intellect and attentive listening during their weekly discussions following his move to Radio Pacific.

== Business life ==
=== King of Contra ===
Bickerstaff was the original pioneer of 'Contra' and for most of his career, he was not paid a salary by the radio station. Rather he developed his own list of advertisers and sold their product on "time" – a certain number of minutes an hour – the station gave him in lieu of salary.

He had a company called Artnoc (Contra spelled backwards).

TVs, refrigerators, microwaves, or Souvenir editions of All Black or All White books – Bickerstaff sold them all, while at the same time drawing listeners with his controversial commentaries on sport.

=== Bickerstaff and the Mad Butcher ===
As Rattue recorded, Bickerstaff was responsible for giving Sir Peter Leitch his Mad Butcher "nickname".

The two met in the Wiri Trust Hotel bar. Sir Peter, then a dyslexic former grave digger just beginning in business with Rosella Meats, took exception to Sportsline getting stuck into the Mangere East Rugby League Club, of which he was already a keen supporter.

He ended up taking (and losing) bets off air with Bickerstaff, so when the radio man tried to sell him advertising he decided it was more sensible to spend the money promoting his business than losing it gambling.

Leitch said in a newspaper interview he was sipping beer with Bickerstaff "and this Maori guy walks in, points to him and says: 'Hey, there's that ----ing mad butcher!'"

The expletive deleted throw-away-line became a household name through many years of advertising with Bickerstaff.

They remained friends for life. Sir Peter attended Bickerstaff's sixtieth birthday party, regularly called him to enquire after his well being, and spoke at his 2009 funeral.

=== Newspaper columnist and author ===
During the 1980s Bickerstaff regularly wrote a sports column for the Sunday News. In 1998 he wrote and published Heroes and Villains with Josh Easby, Jenny Wheeler, and John Andrews.

The book was a nostalgic review of incidents of high and low moments in sport, giving the Bickerstaff perspective on "what really happened."

Sportsmen covered included cricketer Sir Richard Hadlee, yachtsman Chris Dickson, John Adshead, and Charlie Dempsey, the men behind the 1982 All Whites Soccer World Cup campaign, and All Blacks Buck Shelford, Don Clarke, and Keith Murdoch.

Published by Hilton Valentine, a company the quartet formed for the purpose, it was a Father's Day best-seller.

=== Bickerstaff and professional rugby ===
In the first chapter of his book Heroes and Villains Bickerstaff describes how in 1977, nearly twenty years before Rugby finally went professional, he and former All Black Joe Karam formed a company called World Professional Rugby and signed up a squad of 25 top Rugby players with a goal of organising a professional tournament, but the venture ultimately failed because they could not find another international team to play against.

He foresaw an era of professional sport and was involved in backing the controversial Rebel Cavaliers Rugby tour to South Africa in 1986, after an official All Black tour had been blocked by a court injunction the year before.

== Health products entrepreneur ==
During his radio career, Bickerstaff invested in several businesses, including a Howick sports shop and the Ramarama Country Inn.

=== Bee Venom Honey ===
In 1997 he founded a health products company, Happy Families Ltd with partner Jenny Wheeler, and became the first to advertise honey with added bee venom as a joint supplement.

Bickerstaff had injected himself with bee stings in the knee he'd originally injured as a teenage athlete after interviewing an expert on bee sting therapy (apitherapy) on his show. He was convinced of the effectiveness of bee venom for joint pain as a result of this experience.

When he heard Nelson apiarist Phil Cropp was making Nectarease, a honey with added bee venom, he offered to market it if he could have exclusive rights to directly sell it.

Within two years Happy Families developed their own brand of honey and bee venom products, known as Honeybalm and BV Relief, and for several years continued to focus on marketing honey-related products including honey and bee venom capsules, an Active Manuka cream, and Honeybalm For Pets for arthritic dogs and horses.

=== Male Impotence and Herbal Ignite ===
Happy Families began promoting erectile dysfunction product Ignite after Bickerstaff began talking publicly about male impotence in the mid 1990s, one of the first public figures to be willing to talk openly about this male health issue.

Ignite was launched in early 1999 as an herbal alternative to pharmaceutical medicines like Viagra which were being launched in the New Zealand market.

Before Viagra was a legal prescription product in New Zealand Bickerstaff was buying it off the web and on-selling it to his car dealer and horse trainer friends. In the process he got practised at talking to his mates about their sex lives. When Viagra was legally introduced he developed Ignite and began marketing on radio.

Over the next decade, he became identified with Ignite as he did live callouts and voiced radio ads for the product. He answered the 0800 line for several hours each day and personally talked to many of his customers.

Eventually, Ignite and a prostate health product (once called Quup, now Prostate Power Flow) became Happy Families lead products and the honey and bee venom line was withdrawn.

Happy Families was sold to Intenza NZ Ltd after Bickerstaff's death in 2009 and now focuses on sexual health products for men and women.

Bickerstaff was happily actively engaged with the Happy Families business until his death in 2009.

== Sporting life ==
From a keen sporting family, Bickerstaff's athletics career ended almost before it began when he damaged his right knee training in the hammer throw event.

He moved on to golf and then billiards, (he was NZ master's billiards champion in 1982). He said publicly that giving up golf for billiards was one of his stupider decisions, because instead of enjoying the health benefits of roaming golf courses he ended up standing around billiard tables late into the night – with subsequent impact on his weight and his fitness.

Boxing was a lifelong obsession, and Tim attended several world title fights which included Muhammad Ali regaining the title from Leon Spinks and Sugar Ray Leonard avenging his defeat at the hands of Roberto Duran.

In his book Heroes and Villains, Muhammad Ali was his pick as the greatest fighter that ever lived.

== Ill health and death ==
In his late 50s Bickerstaff was diagnosed as diabetic, and his health gradually deteriorated over the next decade. In 2000 he moved to Whitianga, from where he was actively engaged with the Happy Families business until his death in 2009.

He died of a heart attack, sitting peacefully in his chair waiting for an All Blacks play Australia in Tokyo game to begin, at his Whitianga home on 31 October 2009.

Even in death, Bickerstaff made headlines around the world, after Halloween trick-or-treaters found the 67-year-old diabetic through a window, but when their door-knocking failed to rouse him, they entered the house and set off his medic alert bracelet.
