= New Zealand Media Awards =

Media awards

- Awarded for: Excellence in New Zealand journalism
- Country: New Zealand
- Presented by: News Publishers' Association
- Formerly called: Qantas Press Awards, Qantas Media Awards, Canon Media Awards, Voyager Media Awards
- First award: 1973
- Website: npa.co.nz/nz-media-awards/

The New Zealand Media Awards are annual awards recognising excellence in New Zealand journalism. First held in 1973, they are managed by the News Publishers' Association (formerly the Newspaper Publishers' Association). The awards began with news photography and have since expanded to cover journalism across print, digital, audio and video.

The awards have been known by the names of their naming sponsors, originally the Qantas Press Awards (later the Qantas Media Awards), then the Canon Media Awards, and from 2018 the Voyager Media Awards. In May 2026 the News Publishers' Association ended Voyager Internet's naming rights sponsorship, and the 2026 awards were presented as the New Zealand Media Awards.

== History ==
The awards were first presented in 1973 with the Photographer of the Year trophy awarded at a ceremony at the Auckland Press Club. (Note: Te Ara: The Encyclopedia of New Zealand gives 1974 as the year of the first awards.) Organised by the Newspaper Publishers' Association and initially sponsored by Qantas as the Qantas Press Awards, they initially recognised news photography and later expanded to other forms of journalism, including television and radio. They were renamed the Qantas Media Awards in 1993. Television awards later moved to separate ceremonies, and the last television award presented at the media awards, the McKendry Award for video journalism, ran until 2011. Canon became naming sponsor in 2011 and the awards were held as the Canon Media Awards until 2017. Internet provider Voyager Internet took over as naming sponsor from 2018.

On 6 May 2026, two weeks before that year's ceremony, the News Publishers' Association terminated Voyager's naming rights sponsorship after becoming aware of social media content reposted by Voyager founder and chief executive Seeby Woodhouse. The association said his content and opinions were irreconcilable with its values and standards. Woodhouse apologised with Voyager saying it had already decided not to continue as naming sponsor beyond 2026. The 2026 awards were held without a naming sponsor as the New Zealand Media Awards at the Grand Millennium in Auckland on 22 May 2026.

== Awards by year ==
Name	Naming sponsor	Years
Qantas Press Awards / Qantas Media Awards	Qantas	1991–2009, 2010
Canon Media Awards	Canon	2011, 2012, 2013, 2014, 2015, 2016, 2017
Voyager Media Awards	Voyager Internet	2018, 2019, 2020, 2021, 2022, 2023, 2024, 2025
New Zealand Media Awards	None	2026

== Categories ==
The awards recognise the work of reporters, feature writers, columnists, cartoonists, reviewers, photographers and video journalists across print, digital and broadcast media. The number of awards has varied considerably and grown to be more inclusive of different technologies. In 2023 winners were announced across 65 awards but 2024 the programme was reduced to fewer than 40. In 2026, 39 awards were presented across four categories: Written; Audio, Digital and Video; Photography; and All Media. Major awards include Newspaper of the Year, Reporter of the Year, Photographer of the Year, Video Journalist of the Year, Digital News Provider of the Year and Editorial Leader of the Year.

=== Legacy trophies ===
Several awards are presented with historic trophies known as the legacy trophies.

Trophy	Award	First presented	Inaugural winner
Photographer of the Year Trophy	Photographer of the Year	1973	Neville Marriner
NZ Media Awards Cup	Reporter of the Year	1978	Jim Tully
Helen Paske Memorial Trophy	Feature writing	1989	Jane England
Sir Gordon Minhinnick Memorial Trophy	Cartooning	1991	Tom Scott
Sir Terence McLean Trophy	Sports journalism	1994	Andrew Sanders
McKendry Award	Video Journalist of the Year	2000	Scott Munro
Editorial Leader of the Year Cup	Editorial Leader of the Year	2016	Barbara Fountain
Te Tohu Kairangi Trophy	Te Tohu Kairangi Award (formerly Best Reporting – Māori Affairs)	2019	Miriama Kamo
Le Mana Pacific Award	Le Mana Pacific Award	2023	Lydia Lewis

=== Outstanding Achievement Award ===
The Outstanding Achievement Award recognises individuals and organisations for their contribution to New Zealand journalism. Recipients are selected by the News Publishers' Association with input from the editorial heads of the main publishing companies, they are usually limited to two or three a year.

Year	Recipients
2011	Jim Tully; Peter Bush
2012	Ian Grant
2013	Sir Julian Smith; Sir Paul Holmes (posthumous); Tim Pankhurst
2014	The New Zealand Herald; The Timaru Herald; Fred Tulett
2015	Clive Lind; The Dominion Post; New Zealand Listener
2016	The Nelson Mail; The Marlborough Express; Greymouth Star; Massey University journalism school
2017	Donna Chisholm; Ross Setford; Matamata Chronicle; New Zealand Cartoon Archive
2018	Pat Booth; Tom Scott
2019	University of Canterbury journalism programme
2024	Martin van Beynen; Mike Fletcher; Todd Niall
