= Martin van Beynen =

New Zealand journalist & writer (born 1959)

- Born: 1959 (age 66–67)
- Occupation: Columnist
- Employer(s): The Press, Christchurch
- Known for: Journalism

Martin van Beynen (born 1959) is a New Zealand writer, print journalist, and former columnist for The Press in Christchurch.

== Early life ==
Of Dutch extraction, van Beynen was born in Christchurch. He lived in West Auckland from the age of 11. He was educated at St Peter's College, Auckland where he played rugby union and was taught art by Vic Urlich. Van Beynen attended the University of Auckland, where he studied law and wrote for Craccum, graduating in 1981.

Van Beynen is married with three children, and lives in Diamond Harbour, Banks Peninsula.

== Career ==
After "a number of diversions", including working overseas, van Beynen completed a Diploma of Journalism at the University of Canterbury in 1989, and began working with the Otago Daily Times in Dunedin. Van Beynen joined The Press in Christchurch in 1991. After several roles, was appointed Senior Writer in 2004 and is now a Senior journalist. He was a leading columnist on The Press for 17 years until 2021.

=== Controversial views ===
His views have occasionally been controversial. An example was his tongue-in-cheek satire piece describing Paul Henry's "Breakfast for Canterbury", which was broadcast by TVNZ following the 2010 Canterbury earthquake. The piece began: "As dawn broke over the ruined city, God decided to punish the urbanites one more time. He sent them Paul Henry and his Breakfast television team. Billed as Breakfast for Canterbury, the Auckland TV people came down once more to feast on the already well-gnawed bones of injured Christchurch." In 2012, van Beynen published Trapped, an account of experiences of the 2011 Christchurch earthquake.

He made trenchant comment on, and took a controversial position in relation to the David Bain retrial, arguing that David was guilty and the jury got it wrong. Van Beynen was accused of approaching a juror, which led to criticism of him by an official of the High Court and media outlets. Years later, Van Beynen wrote and narrated a ten-episode podcast covering the Bain murder case, "Black Hands". The podcast was launched on 20 July 2017. He also wrote and narrated a one-episode sequel podcast, released on 17 September 2017, in response to critical comments about him by former judge Ian Binnie in a radio interview with Kim Hill.

== Awards ==
Van Beynen has won journalism awards in New Zealand. In 2010, as well as other awards, he won a Qantas Media Award for "Story of the Year" for a feature after the trial and acquittal of David Bain. He was also announced "Fairfax Media Journalist of the Year 2010-2011". In the individual categories of the 2012 Canon Media Awards (previously called the Qantas Media Awards) Van Beynen was named Senior Reporter of the Year and Senior Newspaper Feature Writer of the Year. Additionally, he received a Wolfson Fellowship to Cambridge University, enabling him to study at the university in 2013. Black Hands won the 2021 Best Non Fiction prize at the Ngaio Marsh Awards.

== Personal life ==
In 2024 Van Beynen was diagnosed with inoperable stage-IV lung cancer.

== Publications ==
- Martin van Beynen, Trapped: Remarkable Stories of Survival from the 2011 Canterbury Earthquake, Penguin, 2012, ISBN 9780143567233
- Martin van Beynen, Black Hands, (10-episode podcast), one–episode sequel podcast, Stuff.co.nz, 2017
- Martin van Beynen, Black Hands: Inside the Bain family murders, Penguin, 2020, ISBN 9780143775263
