= Sunday Star-Times =

New Zealand newspaper

- Type: Sunday newspaper
- Format: Tabloid
- Owner: Stuff Ltd
- Editor: Tracy Watkins
- Founded: March 1994; 32 years ago
- Headquarters: Auckland, New Zealand
- Circulation: 77,000 (as of 2017)
- ISSN: 1172-9740
- Website: www.thepost.co.nz/sunday-star-times

The Sunday Star-Times is a New Zealand newspaper published each weekend in Auckland. It covers both national and international news, and is a member of the New Zealand Press Association and News Publishers' Association. It is owned by media business Stuff Ltd, formerly the New Zealand branch of Australian media company Fairfax Media.

In 2019, the newspaper won the title of New Zealand Newspaper of the Year.

== History ==
The Sunday Star-Times was first published in March 1994 after the merger of The Dominion Sunday Times and The Sunday Star. The Dominion Sunday Times started in 1965 and was renamed to Sunday Times (1976–1981), New Zealand Times (1981–1986), New Zealand Sunday Times (1986–1987), then reverted to its original (1987–1992), before it was known as the Sunday Times (1992–1994).

Jenny Wheeler was the editor for six and a half years. The paper was edited by Cate Brett from 2003 until 2008 when she took up a post at the New Zealand Law Commission. She was replaced by Australian Mitchell Murphy who, in 2010, was promoted to the role of publisher for Fairfax Sundays and in 2012 to executive director of publishing. In May 2010 David Kemeys was appointed editor, reporting directly to Murphy.

Jonathan Milne was editor of the Sunday Star Times from 2014 to June 2019.

The paper has a focus on providing an entertaining Sunday read with a mixture of news, features and celebrity gossip.

Regular contributors for the Sunday Star-Times include Rosemary McLeod, Michael Laws, and Finlay MacDonald. Steve Braunias was a regular columnist for the Sunday magazine part of the newspaper, but was sacked in early 2011 for exchanging abusive emails with a Gisborne police prosecutor named Claire Stewart. On 21 October 2018, the paper changed format from broadsheet to tabloid, following Stuff's conversion of its nine daily newspapers in April that year.

=== Māori Party claims ===
In 2004 the paper published a front-page story claiming that the New Zealand Security Intelligence Service was spying on members of the newly formed Māori Party. The article was co-authored by Nicky Hager. A government inquiry led by the Inspector-General of Intelligence and Security later rejected these claims in April 2005, and the paper had to publish a front page apology to its readers when a government investigation found the claims to be unsubstantiated.

== Awards and nominations ==
Year	Award	Result
2019	Voyager Media Awards: Newspaper of the Year	Winner
	Voyager Media Awards: Weekly Newspaper of the Year	Winner
	Voyager Media Awards: Best Newspaper Front Page	Winner

== See also ==
- List of print media in New Zealand
