= Penalty interest =

Punitive interest given to borrowers

Penalty interest, also called penalty APR (penalty annual percentage rate), default interest, interest for/on late payment, statutory interest for/on late payment, interest on arrears, or penal interest, in money lending and in sales contracts is punitive interest charged by a lender to a borrower if installments are not paid according to the loan terms. If an installment is not received according to the repayment terms, sometimes if not received by the end of the month, the borrower/buyer is charged penalty interest on the delayed installment/payment.
