= News Publishers' Association =

New Zealand news industry association

- News Publishers' Association of New Zealand Incorporated
- Abbreviation: NPA
- Type: Trade association
- Headquarters: Auckland
- Region served: New Zealand
- Chair: Grant McKenzie
- Key people: Brook Cameron (General Manager)
- Formerly called: Newspaper Publishers' Association; Newspaper Proprietors' Association of New Zealand

The News Publishers' Association (NPA) is an industry body representing news publishers in New Zealand. The organisation was formed in 1898 as the Newspaper Proprietors' Association and in 1971 changed its name to the Newspaper Publishers' Association of New Zealand. It took its current name in June 2020 to reflect the evolving nature of news publishing and better represent its membership. The association was based in Christchurch until 1920 when it moved to Wellington, and then to Auckland in 2020.

The association operates as an umbrella organisation for commonly owned newspaper industry service providers, including New Zealand Press Association. With the New Zealand Journalists Association, it co-founded the New Zealand Press Council (now known as the New Zealand Media Council) in 1972.

The association hosts the annual New Zealand Media Awards (previously known as the Qantas Press Awards, Qantas Media Awards, Canon Media Awards, and Voyager Media Awards). The awards recognise excellence in New Zealand journalism across print, digital, audio and video.

In 2022 the Commerce Commission authorised the NPA to collectively bargain with Google and Meta for payment for news content on behalf of New Zealand publishers.
