= Gordon McLauchlan =

New Zealand writer and social historian (1931–2020)

Gordon William McLauchlan ONZM (9 January 1931 – 26 January 2020) was a New Zealand writer and social historian. He became a popular media personality through his work on both television and radio.

== Early life and family ==
Born in Dunedin on 9 January 1931, McLauchlan was educated at Wellington College. In 1955, he married Beverley Mary Hogan; the couple had three children and later divorced. He married Beverley Dawn Forbes in 1982.

== Career ==
After spending a year at Victoria University College, McLauchlan started his journalism career as a reporter on the Manawatu Evening Standard. He was the NZPA parliamentary reporter from 1952 to 1955, before moving to the Daily Telegraph in Napier. He was editor of the New Zealand Journal of Agriculture from 1965 to 1971, and the controller of public affairs at Air New Zealand between 1971 and 1973. In 1973, McLauchlan became a freelance journalist and writer, and from 2000 he was a full-time writer. He was a columnist for The New Zealand Herald newspaper between 1971 and 1975, and from 1990, and was foundation director and station manager of Radio Pacific.

As a social historian and cultural critic, McLauchlan wrote many books, including the best-selling The Passionless People, a social history of New Zealand, published in 1976, which spawned a two-part television documentary. Over 20 other books were to follow, as well as a play, The Last Days of Frank Sargeson. For 10 years, he was also editor-in-chief of the Bateman New Zealand Encyclopaedia, first published in 1984, and revised editions in 1987, 1991, and 1995.

McLauchlan's writing led to a second career as a media commentator, presenting television and radio programmes. Between 1984 and 1988, he presented Weekend, a magazine programme on TVNZ, and later he was co-presenter of the TV3 news magazine programme, 5.30 Live, from 1993 to 1994. He made regular appearances on RNZ National's The Panel segment on weekday afternoons. He was a founding trustee of the Michael King Writers Centre.

== Honours and awards ==
In 1987, McLauchlan won Presenter of the Year at New Zealand's annual television awards. In the 2019 Queen's Birthday Honours, he was appointed an Officer of the New Zealand Order of Merit, for services to historical research.

== Death ==
McLauchlan died on 26 January 2020, a few days after his 89th birthday. In tribute, Hamish Keith tweeted that McLauchlan was New Zealand's "greatest storyteller".
