= Mark Winter =

New Zealand editorial cartoonist

Mark Anthony Winter (born 1958 or 1959) is an editorial cartoonist from New Zealand who works under the pen-name Chicane.

His cartoons have been published in The Southland Times newspaper for more than 25 years, and are now published nationally via the stuff.co.nz website. His work also features in the PSA Journal (New Zealand Public Service Association). In 1992, Winter completed a master's degree in education at Massey University, with a thesis on editorial cartoons as educational tools.

In 2008, he won the cartoonist category in the Qantas Media Awards.

He was elected to the Invercargill City Council in 1983. In 1986, he was the highest-polling councillor and was thus made Deputy Mayor under Eve Poole until 1989. Following Poole's death in 1992, he ran in the resulting by-election and placed third. He again served as Deputy Mayor under David Harrington. He was a member of the Southland Regional Council until 2007.
