= Deborah Coddington =

New Zealand politician

- Born: Waipukurau, New Zealand
- Occupations: Journalist, politician
- Spouse: Colin Carruthers (barrister)

Deborah Leslie Coddington is a New Zealand journalist and former ACT New Zealand politician.

== Pre-political career ==
Coddington, born in Waipukurau, worked from 1973 to 1984 as a magazine journalist, but in 1985 moved to Russell, a town in the Bay of Islands, where she owned and operated a café and restaurant. In 1989, she returned to journalism, writing for the Metro and North & South magazines. In 1993, she became a broadcaster, working for the BBC World Service's New Zealand operation. She then returned to magazines, becoming senior feature writer for North & South. In 2002, she won the Qantas Senior Feature Writer of the Year Award for her work.

From 1978 to 2004, her partner was the controversial publisher Alister Taylor, with whom she had three children.

== Entry into politics ==
Coddington first became involved in politics in the context of the Libertarianz party, and in the 1996 election and the 1999 election, the Libertarianz ranked her second and third, respectively, on their party list.

At the 1998 local elections she stood for a seat on the Auckland Regional Council in the Auckland Isthmus Ward as an Auckland Now ticket candidate, but was not elected.

== Member of Parliament ==
New Zealand Parliament
Years	Term	Electorate	List	Party
2002–05	47th	List	6	ACT

Later, however, Coddington transferred her support to the ACT New Zealand party, which ranked her sixth on its party list in the 2002 election, high enough for her to enter Parliament as a list MP.

In Parliament, Coddington was ACT's education spokeswoman, in which capacity she promoted 'school choice' through a program of school vouchers, praising its adoption in "darkest Africa".

Many New Zealanders know her as the compiler of a register of sex-offenders which aims to publicly identify those convicted of sex-crimes. This register, first published in 1996, generated considerable criticism from those who alleged it breached the rights of criminals named in it. She has also published a registry of convicted child molesters in Australia. Coddington has also had a high amount of media interest in her personal life – early in 2004 journalists widely canvassed the financial problems of Alister Taylor, her partner (and her subsequent split from him), and later the same year, the media reported Coddington's distress about attention received from Roger Kerr, the executive director of the New Zealand Business Roundtable. Kerr allegedly chased her drunk, across the grounds of parliament. Coddington described the media's portrayal of events as "wildly overblown".

On 15 April 2005, Coddington announced that she would not seek re-election in 2005. In the announcement, she said that she did not regret entering politics, but said that she was no longer as eager to fight political battles. Coddington attributed her change in perspective primarily to her recent marriage to Wellington lawyer, Colin Carruthers QC.

== Return to journalism ==
Coddington returned to journalism, writing for the Herald on Sunday and North & South. In 2019, Coddington was a judge for the Voyager Media Awards.

=== Controversy ===
In November 2006, Coddington published an article, "Asian Angst", in North & South magazine, questioning immigration and referencing the high profile of "Asian" crime, talking of a "gathering crime tide" and an "Asian menace". Coddington's article attempted to justify this language by pointing to a 53% increase in police arrest figures for "Asians" over the last 10 years. However she neglected to mention that the corresponding overall "Asian" population had increased by more than 100% in that time and that the arrest rate among that "Asian" population (which was already very low compared to the general population) had halved. A member of the general population was now four times more likely to be arrested than an "Asian".

Outraged reaction swiftly followed, and formal complaints to New Zealand Press Council came from the Asia New Zealand Foundation, the head of Journalism at Massey University and a consortium of mostly academics, journalists and ethnic Asian community leaders led by Tze Ming Mok.

The following month, the New Zealand Press Council condemned Coddington's article and ordered North & South to print an apology.

The Press Council found the language of the article "misleading" and "emotionally loaded". The Council stated that even though journalists are "entitled to take a strong position on issues they address ... that does not legitimise gratuitous emphasis on dehumanising racial stereotypes and fear-mongering and, of course, the need for accuracy always remains".

Coddington called the New Zealand Press Council's decision "pathetic".

== Bibliography ==
- Coddington, Deborah (1993), Turning pain into gain: the plain person's guide to the transformation of New Zealand, 1984–1993, Auckland, [N.Z.]: Alister Taylor, ISBN 0-908578-35-0
- Coddington, Deborah (1996), The 1996 paedophile and sex offender index, Auckland, [N.Z.]: Alister Taylor Publishers, ISBN 0-908578-54-7
- Coddington, Deborah (1997), The Australian paedophile and sex offender index, Sydney, [N.S.W.]: D. Coddington, ISBN 0-646-30777-0
- Coddington, Deborah (1998), Liberty belle: ten years of writing, Auckland, [N.Z.]: Alister Taylor, ISBN 0-908578-71-7 (with introduction by Lindsay Perigo)
- Coddington, Deborah (1999), Perigo: politically incorrect: the story of Lindsay Perigo, Auckland, [N.Z.]: Radio Pacific Publishing, ISBN 0-473-05984-3
- Coddington, Deborah (2003), Let the parents choose: why the Government should allow families freedom in their children's education, Auckland, [N.Z.]: Valentine Press, ISBN 0-908578-67-9
- Coddington, Deborah (2003), The New Zealand paedophile and sex offender index, Auckland, [N.Z.]: Alister Taylor Publishers, ISBN 0-908578-92-X
- Prebble, Richard; et al. (2003), Liberal thinking, Wellington, [N.Z.]: ACT New Zealand Parliamentary Office (Coddington and co-author Richard Prebble contributed: "Lessons of freedom and choice".)
- Russell, Marcia; Coddington, Deborah (1979), The New Zealander: 1980 annual, Auckland, [N.Z.]: New Zealander Magazine Publishing
- Taylor, Alister; Coddington, Deborah (1981), Robin White, New Zealand painter, Martinborough, [N.Z.]: Alister Taylor
- Taylor, Alister; Coddington, Deborah (1994), Honoured by the Queen: recipients of honours, 1953–1993, and royal appointments to the [P]rivy Council, as Queen's Counsel and as Justices of the Peace, Auckland, [N.Z.]: New Zealand Who's Who Aotearoa Ltd., ISBN 0-908578-34-2
- Taylor, Alister; Coddington, Deborah (1995), Honoured by the Queen: recipients of honours, London, [England] & Auckland, [N.Z.]: Belgravia Press & New Zealand Who's Who Aotearoa Ltd., ISBN 0-908578-46-6
- Taylor, Alister; Coddington, Deborah (1995), The New Zealand who's who: Aotearoa, Auckland, [N.Z.]: New Zealand Who's Who Aotearoa Ltd., ISBN 0-908578-48-2
