= Alister Taylor =

New Zealand publisher (1943–2019)

- Born: Rupert Alister Halls Taylor; 21 September 1943
- Died: 9 September 2019 (aged 75)
- Occupation: Publisher
- Partner: Deborah Coddington (1978–2004)

Rupert Alister Halls Taylor (21 September 1943 – 9 September 2019) was an innovative and controversial New Zealand publisher.

He published The Little Red Schoolbook in the 1970s (widely criticised by morals campaigners for its subversive content), Tim Shadbolt's autobiographical Bullshit and Jellybeans, and significant works on artists C. F. Goldie and Gustavus von Tempsky.

== Tussles with the publishing industry ==
Untrusted in the New Zealand publishing industry for slow payment of debts, he was bankrupted in the early 1980s at the instigation of the Publishers' Association. Discharged ten years later, he began a new publishing venture, reissuing some of his earlier publications in edited and updated form. He established New Zealand Who's Who Aotearoa, with the first volume published in 1992, in competition to the standard biographical work Who's Who in New Zealand (last published in 1991). In 2001 he was accused by the London Daily Mirror Sorted column by Penman & Greenwood, in a report headlined "Full medal racket", of targeting national heroes in a publishing con.

In 2005 he was again in financial difficulty when the New South Wales Department of Fair Trading was granted an injunction banning him from marketing a range of non-existent publications about prominent Australians. The Supreme Court found that he had solicited fees from Australians to be included in a publication entitled the Australian Roll of Honour series, which did not exist.

== Personal life ==
His partner from 1978 to 2004 was the journalist and politician Deborah Coddington, with whom he had three children. Taylor was a "loved brother, uncle, father and grandfather". Upon his death his daughter Imogen described him to journalists Kendall Hutt and Mandy Te as a "sensitive, artistic, kind of guy".

== Publications ==
- The Little Red Schoolbook
- Down Under The Plum Trees, explicit sex instruction manual, 1972.
- Tim Shadbolt, autobiography, 'Bullshit and Jellybeans'.
- Sue Kedgley, Sexist Society, 1973.
- Sam Hunt, From Bottle Creek.
