= Judith Baragwanath =

New Zealand writer, satirist, fashion critic, fashion muse, model and socialite

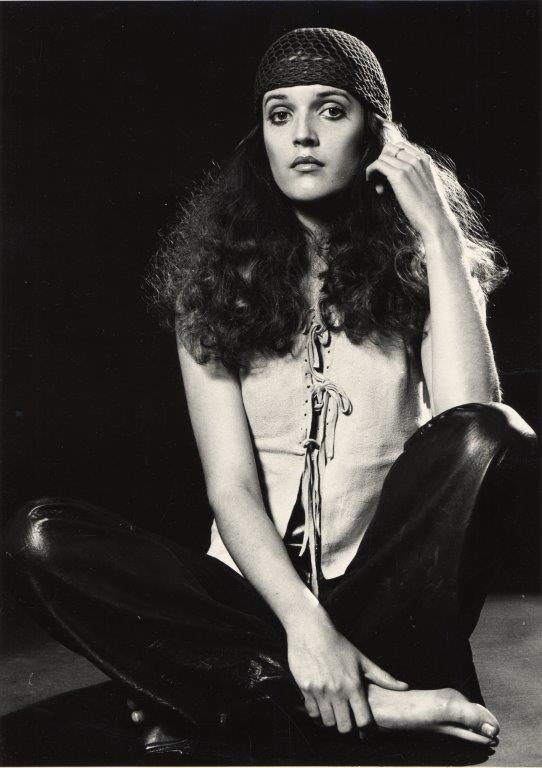
Baragwanath in the 1970s

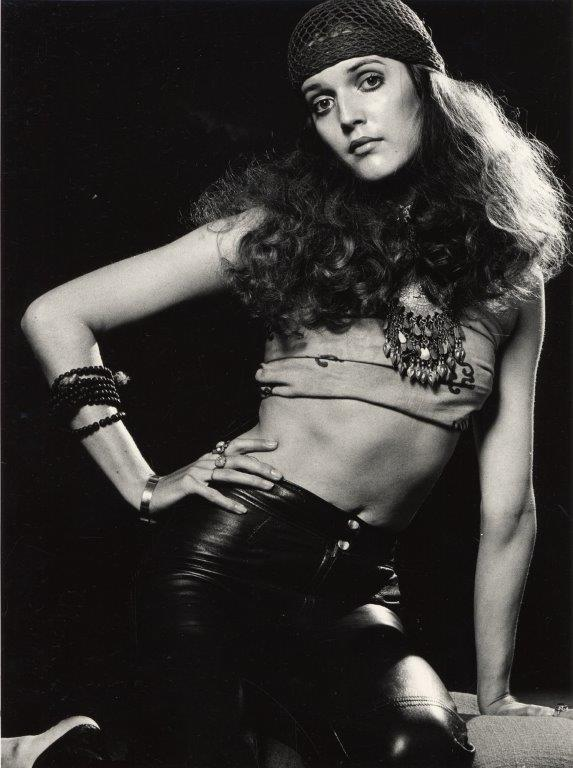
Baragwanath in the 1970s

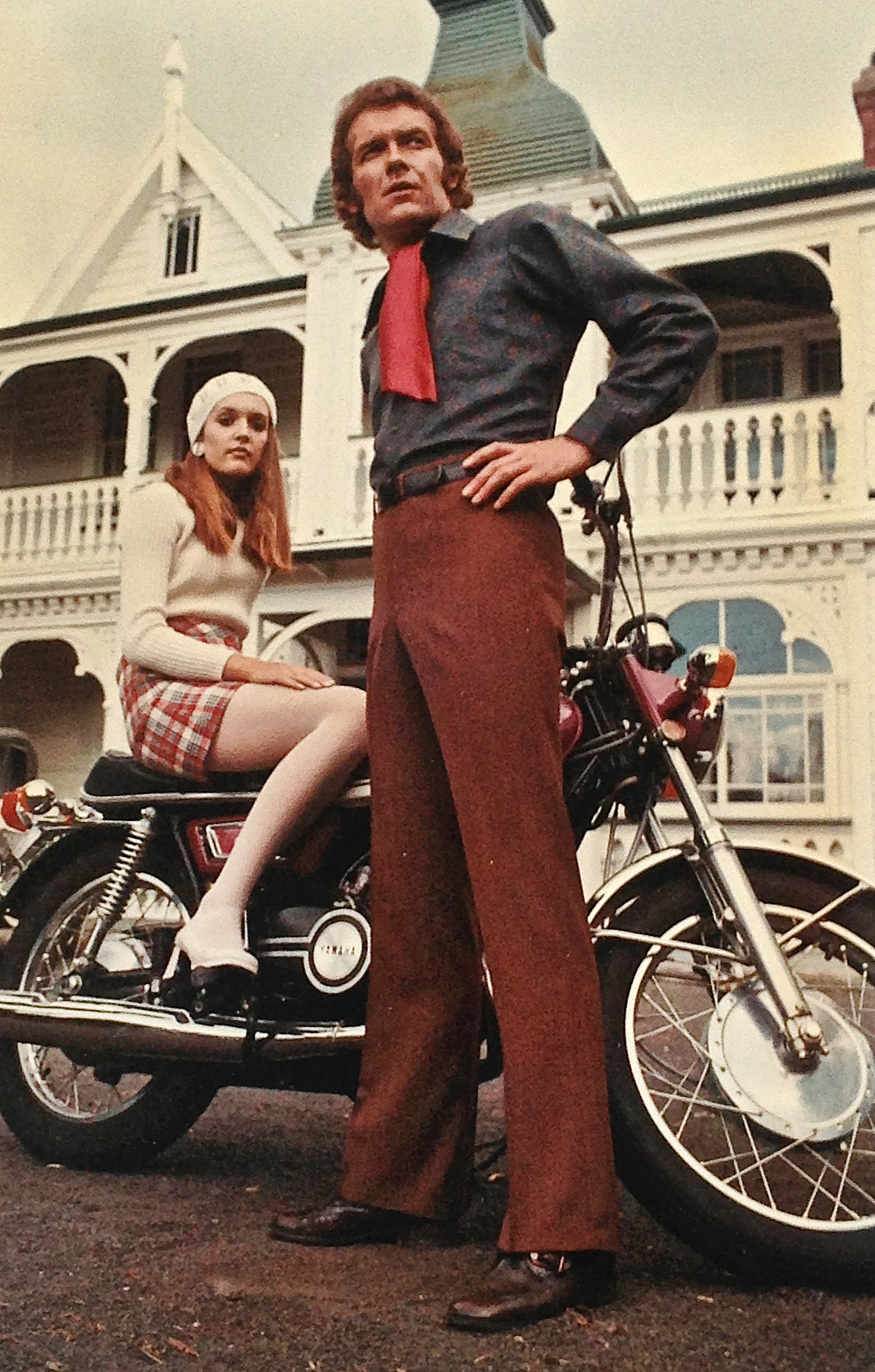
Baragwanath in the 1970s with her then-partner, Rhys Jones

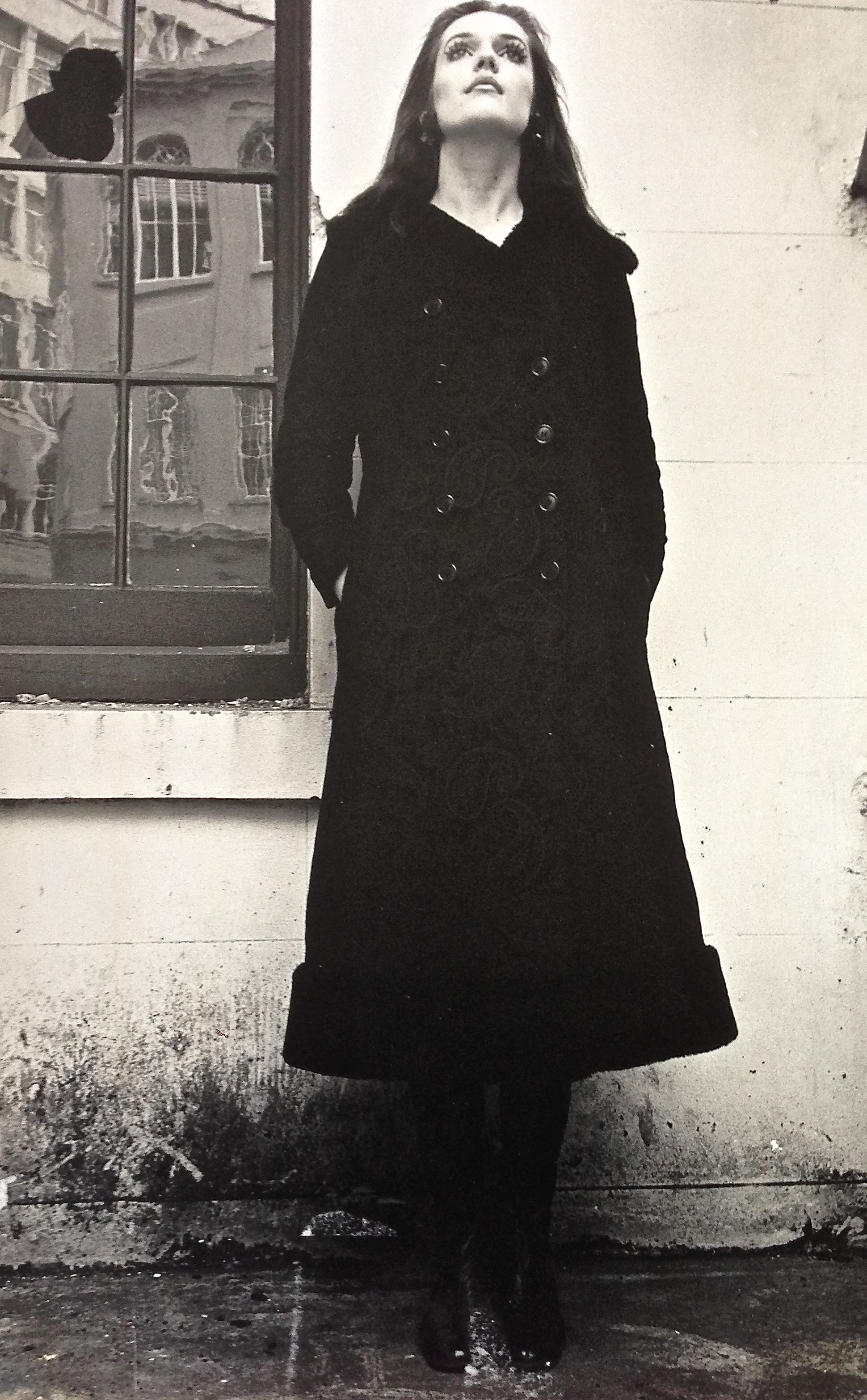
Baragwanath in the 1970s

Judith Mary Baragwanath (née Seay; born 7 January 1951) is a New Zealand writer, satirist, fashion critic, fashion muse, model, socialite and maître d’ also known as "Old Black Lips." She rose to prominence in the 1960s as a New Zealand model after appearing in Vogue New Zealand at the age of 15. She is well known for her magazine column and feature writing, including contributions (1982–2002) to "Felicity Ferret", a gossip column published in Auckland magazine Metro. New Zealand journalist and writer Steve Braunias has called her "just about, if not the most, concise writer being regularly published that this country has ever seen. One of the most vivid writers we've ever had in non-fiction."

== Early life ==
Baragwanath was born in Birmingham, Alabama, US to a New Zealand nurse, Vivienne née Grace, and an American GI, Samuel Cleveland Seay. In 1953 the couple separated, and Vivienne returned to her homeland with her daughter. Judith Seay was raised in Auckland with no memory of her father. In 1968, aged 17, she married model Tom Baragwanath.

== Career ==
In 1966 Baragwanath was discovered by Auckland fashion photographer Desmond Williams and began working as a model while still at Diocesan School for Girls. She made her modelling debut on the pages of Vogue New Zealand (Summer 1966) and was frequently photographed by New Zealand photographers Williams, Roger Donaldson and Michael Baigent and appeared on the pages of British Good Housekeeping. She walked the runway during the 1970s and 1980s for New Zealand labels Tigermoth, the New Zealand Wool Board, Vinka Lucas, Blooms and Patrick Steel.

Baragwanath established herself among Auckland's creative community, and her friends included painters Pat Hanly, Bill Hammond, and Gavin Chilcott, musicians Graham Brazier and Dave McArtney, writer Hamish Keith

In the 1970s she worked as fashion editor for the newspaper the Sunday News and in the 1980s was fashion editor for The Sun. In 1982 she was approached by Warwick Roger to write for his new magazine Metro, as a columnist for a series called “Across Town”. He also wanted her to contribute to an anonymous gossip column called “Felicity Ferret.” This was intended to be both witty and scathing to a degree new to New Zealand readers. It was inspired by the gossip columns of UK magazines like Tatler, Private Eye and the Spectator. For years, few knew who “Felicity Ferret” was, although many suspected it was Baragwanath. The “Ferret” referred to Baragwanath, when she appeared in the column, as “Old Black Lips” to deter suspicion. It was axed in 2002. Although several writers contributed anonymously to the Ferret, Baragwanath is understood to have been its foremost writer. She was ideally placed to report on the scandalous behaviour of Auckland's pre-1987-crash social elite. As well as being a well-connected model and socialite, Baragwanath worked as a waitress and maître d' for a series of Auckland restaurants from the 1970s.

A widely reported incident in 1974 did much for Baragwanath’s notoriety. Baragwanath attended a party at the Rose Gardens in Parnell, Auckland, at which her friend was waitressing. Elton John and his manager, John Reid, were also there. The atmosphere deteriorated after Reid asked for whisky, which wasn’t available. Reid could not be mollified. “You’re an incompetent!” he is alleged to have shouted, and threw a glass of champagne in the face of party host Richard Wilson. “I lost my temper,” Baragwanath told Metro magazine in 1987. “I hate injustice and I said to him ‘What the f*** do you think you’re doing, you horrible little man?”. Rolling Stone reported she stated “How could you do that to anyone, you rotten little bastard?”. “He said “Speak to me like that again and I’ll punch your lights out,” and next minute I was on the floor. Down I went. I had a black eye and was taken home to my horrified mother and grandmother.” Reid would then become involved in a dispute with journalist David Wheeler which became physical. Baragwanath and Wheeler decided to press charges. Reid’s defence, that he was under extreme pressure and hadn’t slept for nights, did not impress Mr Justice McMullin, and Reid spent 21 days in Mount Eden gaol. He settled out of court with Baragwanath for NZ $2,500. Baragwanath bought her first car with the proceeds.

Baragwanath has worked as a columnist for the Sunday Star Times, the New Zealand Listener, and Cuisine magazine. Since 2017 she has been a reviewer and occasional columnist for North & South, Metro magazine and The New Zealand Listener.

== Personal life ==
Baragwanath married twice; first to Tom Baragwanath in 1968, and later to restaurant owner Leroy Moody in 1985. Her daughter was born in 1969.

Baragwanath lives on Waiheke Island.

== Influence on fashion ==
In 2010, New Zealand fashion designer Kate Sylvester paid homage to the “notorious socialite” with a winter collection called "Diamond Dogs", the nickname given to Baragwanath's social set. Sylvester's models were sent down the runway in gym slips, jodhpur-cut trousers, military jackets, fur coats and black lipstick; the look Baragwanath had popularised.

== Awards ==
- 2001 Qantas Media Awards – finalist: Magazine Feature Writer.
- 2002 Qantas Media Awards – winner: Best Column.
