= North & South (New Zealand magazine) =

New Zealand current affairs magazine

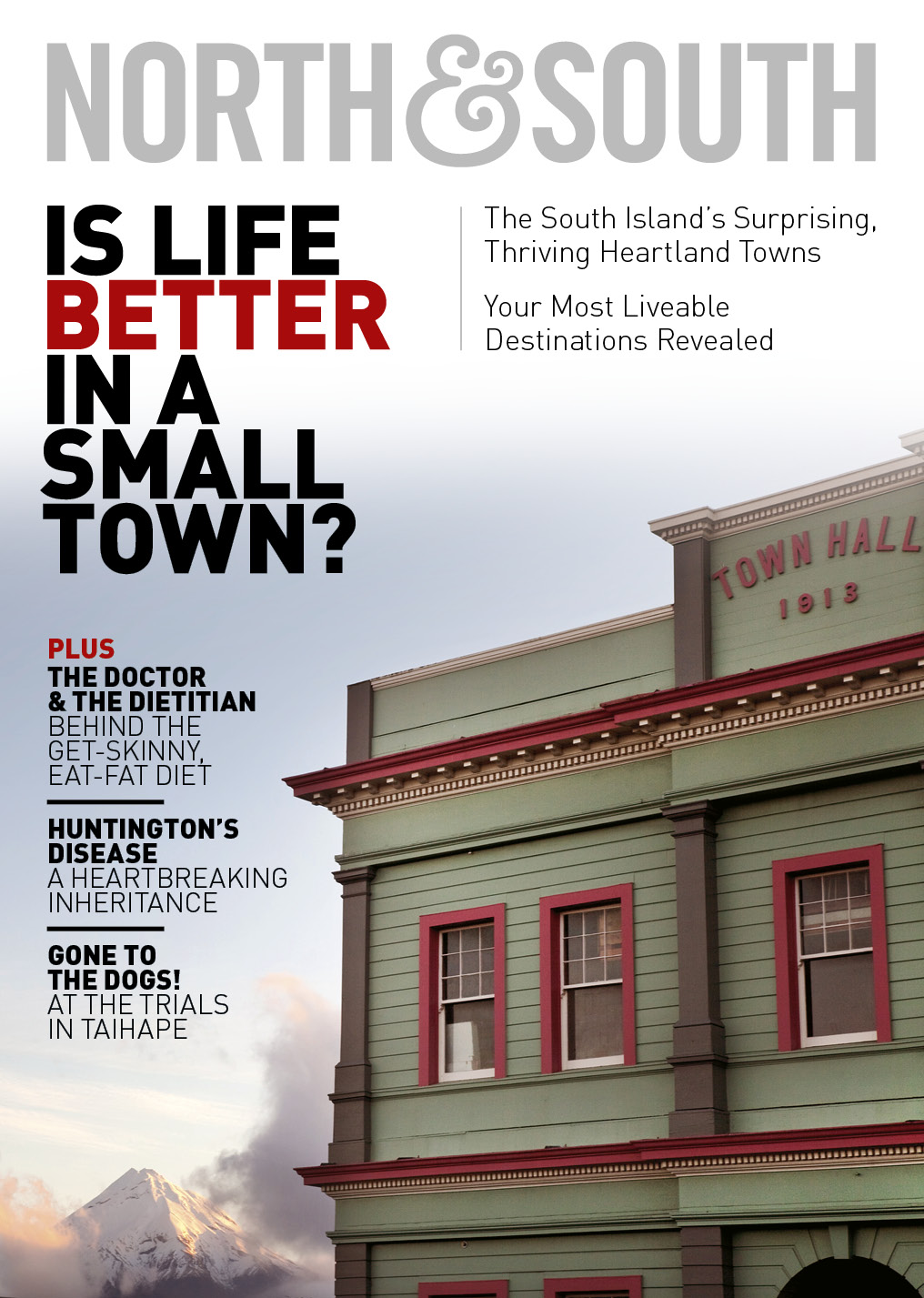
- Cover of August 2015 issue
- Editor: Susanna Andrew
- Former editors: Robyn Langwell (1986–2008); Virginia Larson (2008–2020); Rachel Morris (2020–22); Kirsty Cameron (2022–23)
- Categories: Current affairs
- Frequency: Monthly
- Circulation: 27,724 *NZ Audit Bureau of Circulation (July–Dec 2009)
- Founded: 1986
- First issue: April 1986
- Company: Bauer Media (2012–2020)
- Country: New Zealand
- Based in: Auckland
- Website: https://www.northandsouth.co.nz/
- ISSN: 0112-9023

North & South is a New Zealand monthly national current affairs magazine, specialising in long-form investigative stories and photojournalism. The editorial content also includes profiles of New Zealanders, brief stories, essays, opinion, music, film and book reviews, food, and travel.

== History and profile ==
North & South was launched in April 1986 by Metro Publications – Mick Mason and Bruce Palmer, under editor Robyn Langwell. ACP Magazines then sold to ACP. Bauer Media NZ acquired the title in September 2012. Virginia Larson succeeded Robyn Langwell as editor in 2008 until 2020.

The magazine has won more than 300 journalism, photography and design awards, including multiple MPA Magazine of the Year awards, Citi Journalism Awards for Excellence and Wolfson Fellowships to the University of Cambridge, United Kingdom.

In early April 2020, the Bauer Media Group closed down several of its New Zealand brands including North & South in response to the economic downturn caused by the COVID-19 pandemic in New Zealand.

On 17 June 2020, Sydney investment firm Mercury Capital purchased North and South as part of its acquisition of Bauer Media's New Zealand and Australian media assets. On 17 July, Mercury Capital confirmed that it would be selling North and South to independent publishers Konstantin Richter and Verena Friederike Hasel.

In May 2023, the couple sold North & South magazine to School Road Publishing, part of the Waitapu Group, a New Zealand group of public relations and media agencies owned by Greg Partington. School Road also owns the digital title Woman+.

Until November 2024, the editor at School Road was Susanna Andrew.

On 18 November 2024, School Road announced the magazine's print publication would be put on hold while efforts were made to improve the North & South website. The company blamed flat advertising sales.

In March 2025 North & South was relaunched as a 'digital newsletter' and website edited by Sarah Daniell. School Road said it intended to relaunch North & South as a print magazine.

On 29 October 2025, Daniell revealed the launch had been cancelled weeks before the planned publication date in November. School Road announced it has put the magazine back on 'indefinite hold'.

A story in The Spinoff by Madeleine Chapman on 18 October hinted at the decision behind closing North & South. "There were plans to return [North & South] to print by the end of the year but according to owner Greg Partington this week, 'I’m just not satisfied that the revenues are there'. In other words," Chapman concluded, "it’s dying a very slow and quite depressing death".

North & South has specialised in long-form investigative stories and photojournalism. For example, in an eight-page 2015 article "Long walk to justice", staff writer Mike White asked if New Zealand's justice system should establish an independent commission to investigate wrongful convictions. Issues involving justice in New Zealand provide a theme for many of his stories for North & South.

== Lange v Atkinson ==
In 1995, North & South published an article by Joe Atkinson in which he called ex-Prime Minister David Lange lazy. Lange objected to this and other criticisms in the article, and sued Atkinson and the publishers for defamation. The subsequent case ran for five years, and resulted in the media being able to use a defence of qualified privilege when reporting on politicians. This was a ground-breaking extension of press freedom, which was subsequently subsumed in a more general defence of public interest communication.

== Coddington article controversy ==
In November 2006, Deborah Coddington wrote a cover article "Asian angst", questioning immigration and referencing the high profile of "Asian" crime, talking of a "gathering crime tide" and an "Asian menace". Coddington's article attempted to justify this language by pointing to a 53% increase in police arrest figures for "Asians" over the last 10 years. However, she neglected to mention that the corresponding overall "Asian" population had increased by more than 100% in that time and that the arrest rate among that "Asian" population (which was already very low compared to the general population) had halved. A member of the general population was now four times more likely to be arrested than an "Asian". Outraged reaction swiftly followed, and formal complaints to New Zealand Press Council came from the Asia New Zealand Foundation, the head of Journalism at Massey University and a consortium of mostly academics, journalists and ethnic Asian community leaders led by Tze Ming Mok.

The following month, the New Zealand Press Council condemned Coddington's article and ordered North & South to print an apology. The Press Council found the language of the article "misleading" and "emotionally loaded". The Council stated that even though journalists are "entitled to take a strong position on issues they address ... that does not legitimise gratuitous emphasis on dehumanising racial stereotypes and fear-mongering and, of course, the need for accuracy always remains". Coddington called the New Zealand Press Council's decision "pathetic".

== Columnists and staff writers ==
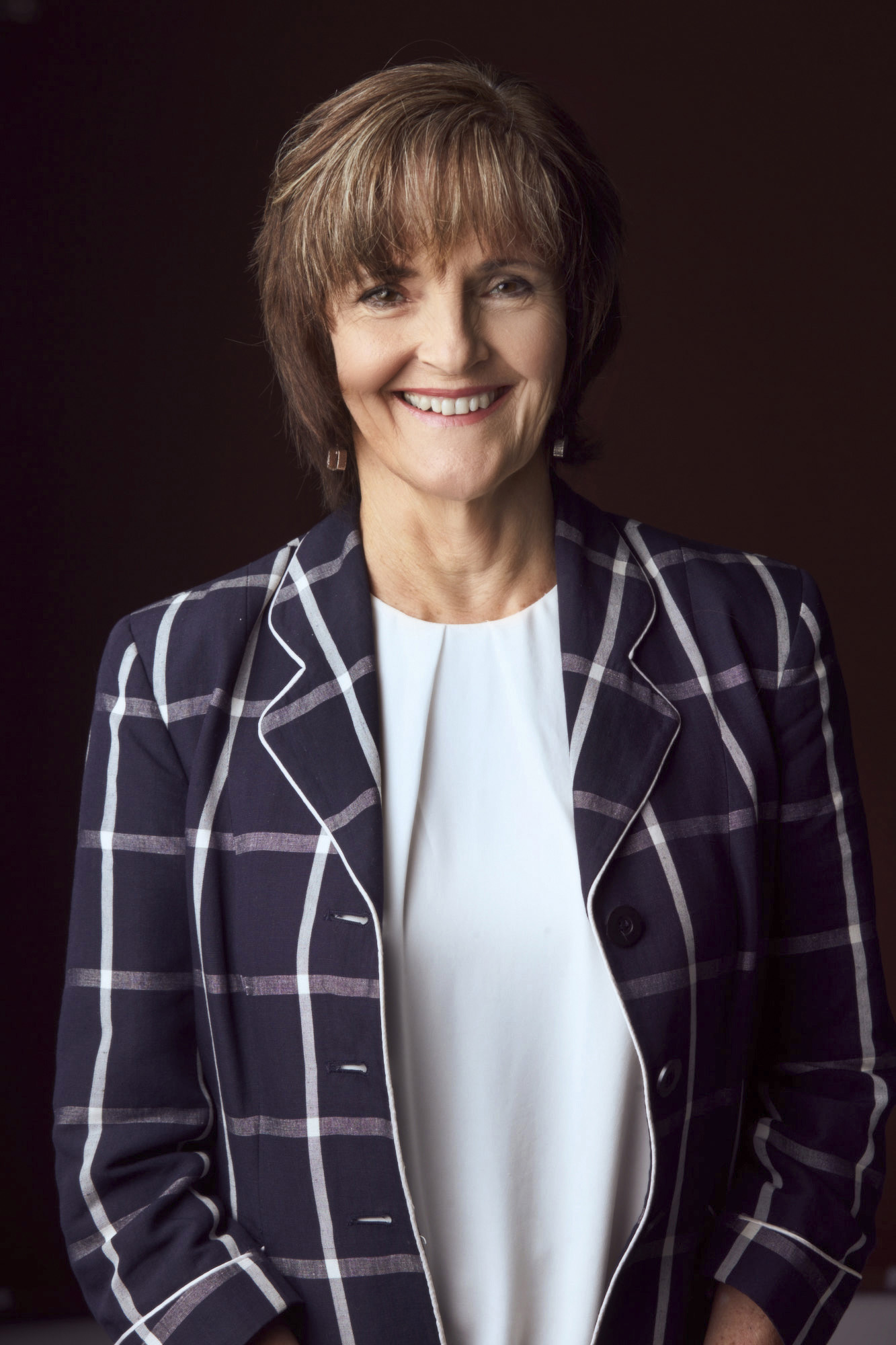
North & South former editor Virginia Larson

A number of prominent New Zealand journalists have written for North and South. These include:

- Bruce Jesson
- Warwick Roger
- Rosemary McLeod
- Pat Booth
- Steven O'Meagher
- Tim Wilson
- Deborah Coddington
- Jenny Chamberlain
- David McLoughlin
- Christine Cole Catley
- Spiro Zavos
- Margot Butcher
- Lauren Quaintance
- Nicola Legat
- Nicola Shepheard
- Mike White
- Joanna Wane
- Finlay Macdonald
- Peter Malcouronne
- Bill Ralston
- Phil Gifford
- Donna Chisholm
- Guyon Espiner
- Judith Baragwanath
- Paul Little
- Steve Braunias
- Jo Seagar
- Nicky Hager
- Colin James
- Jane Tolerton
- Martin van Beynen
- Bevan Rapson

== Gallery ==
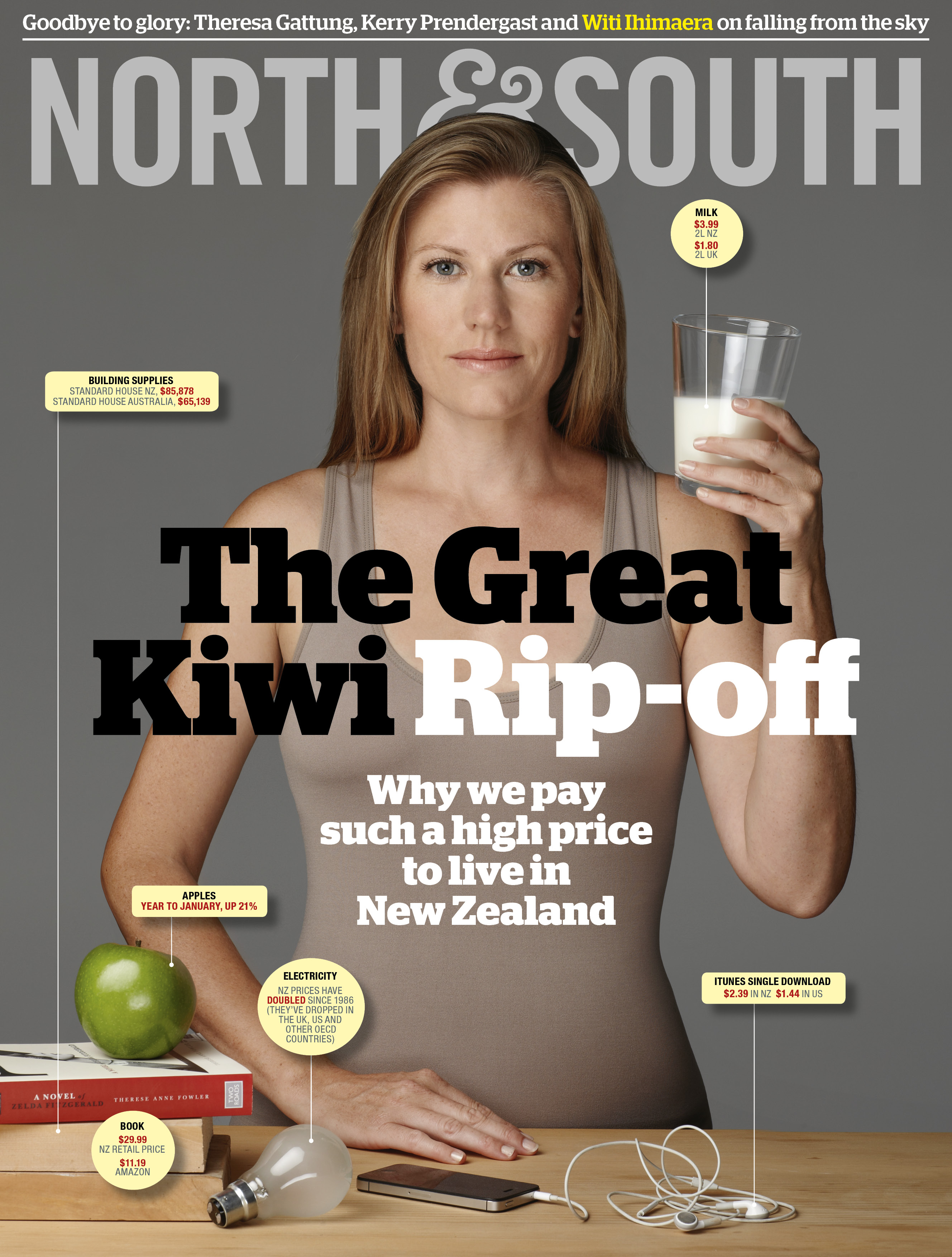
April 2013

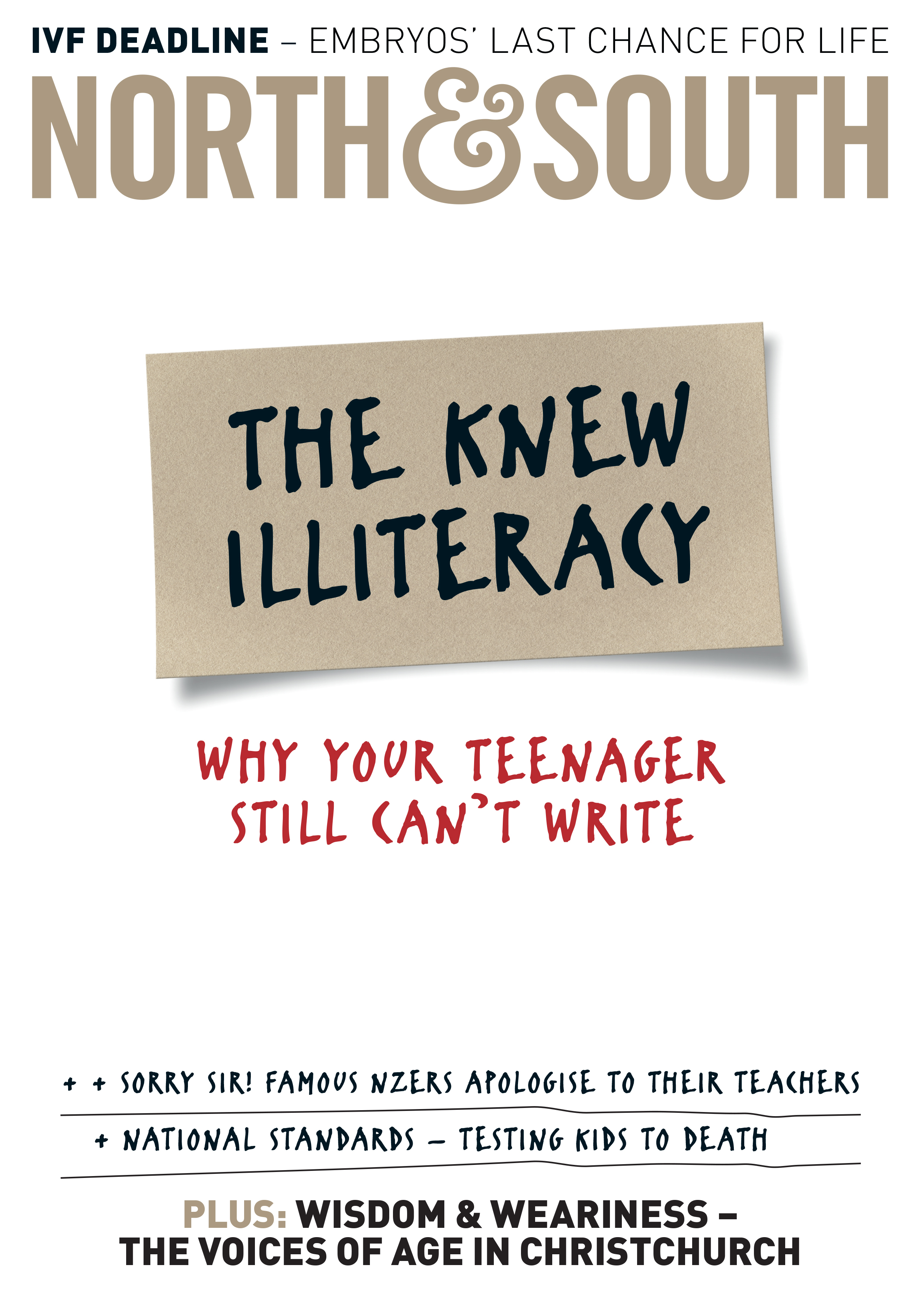
October 2014

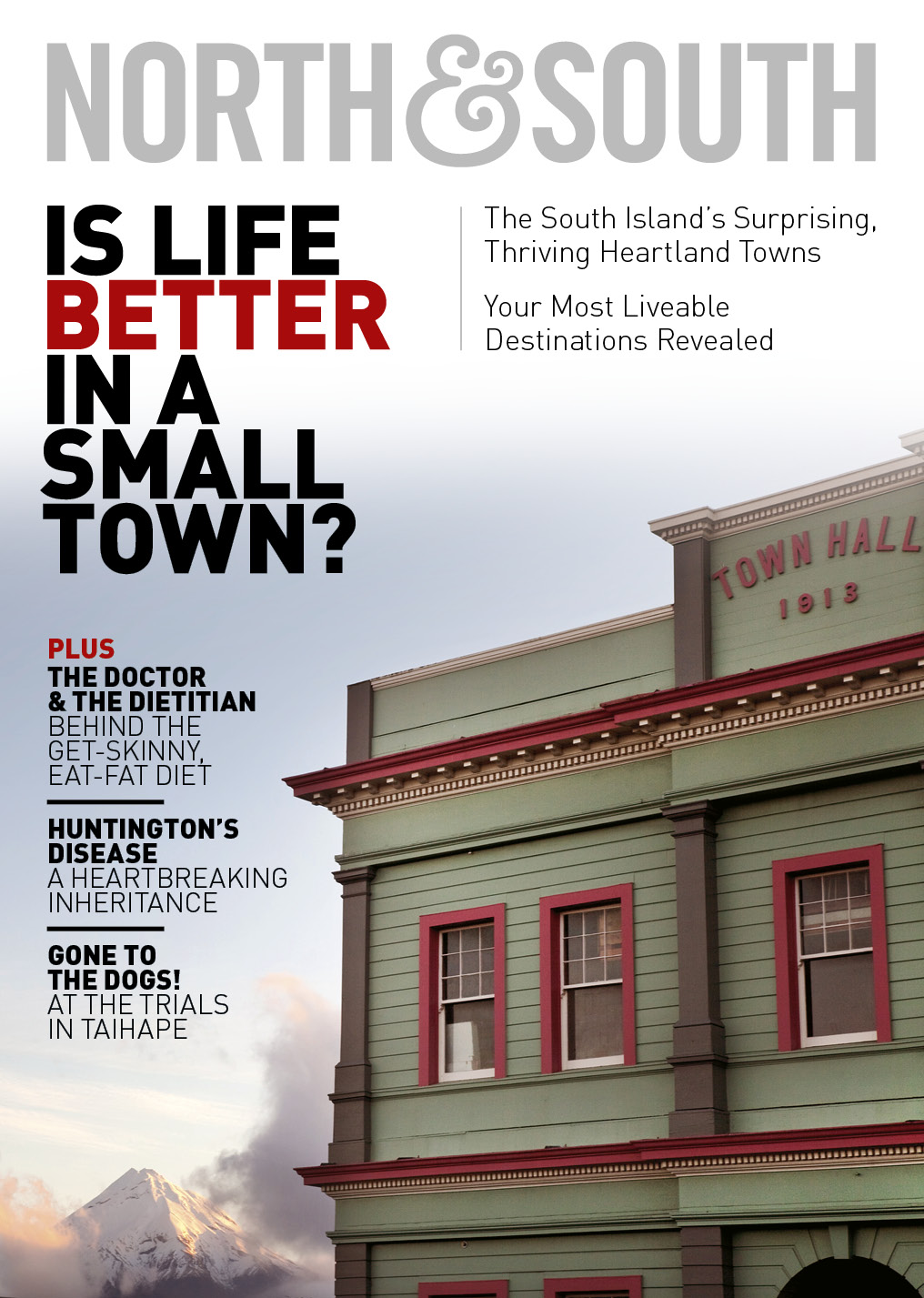
August 2015

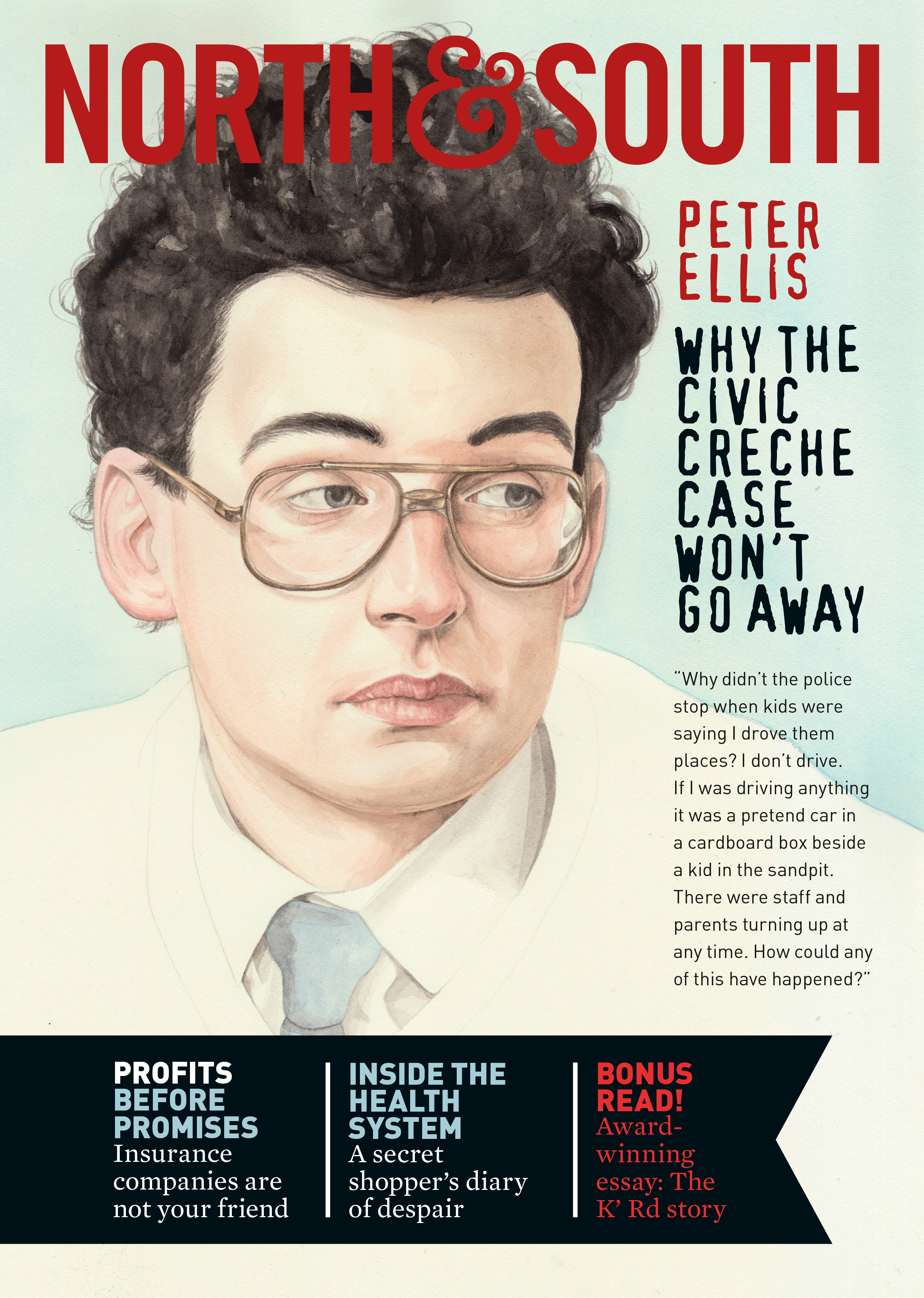
November 2015

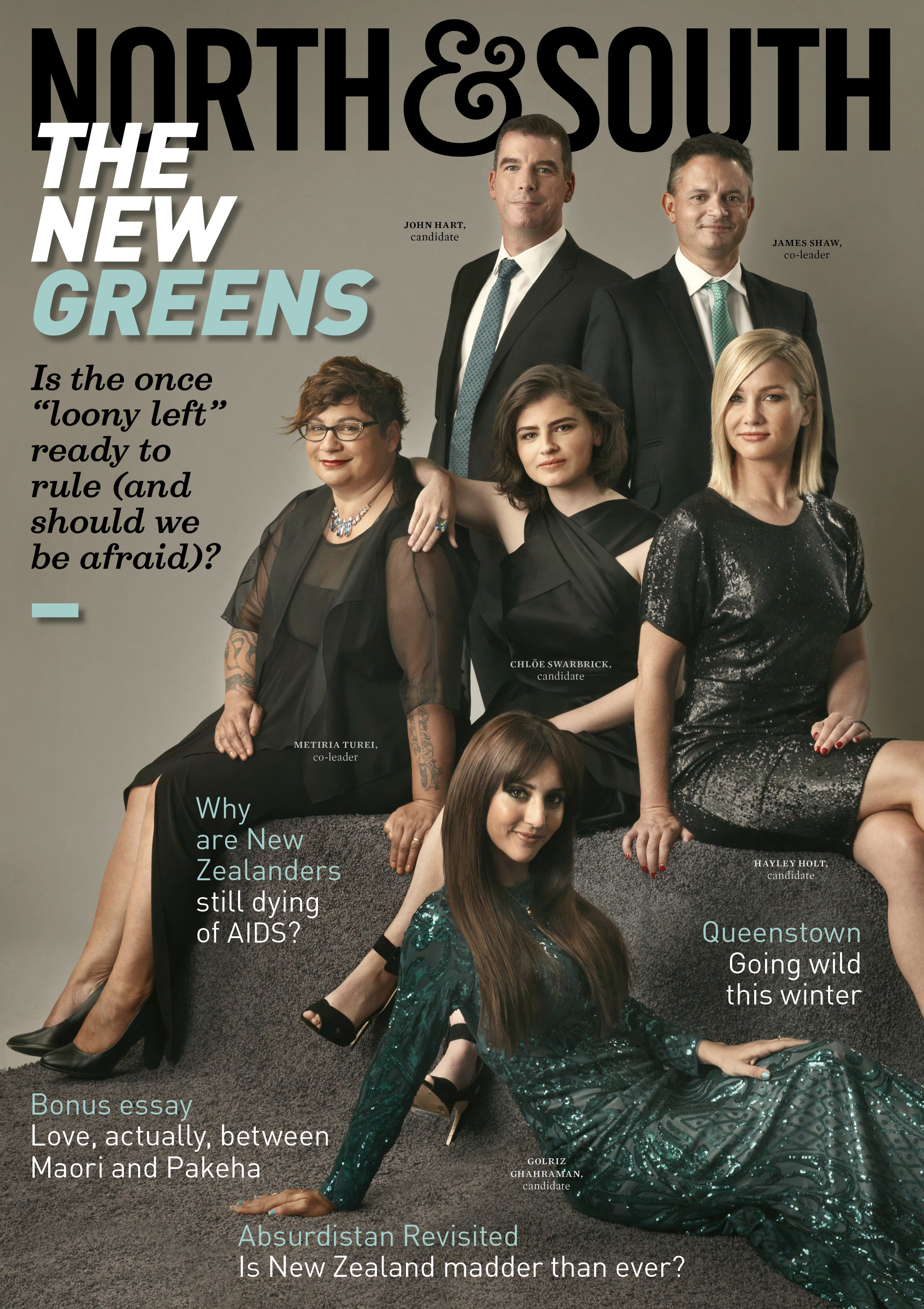
May 2017

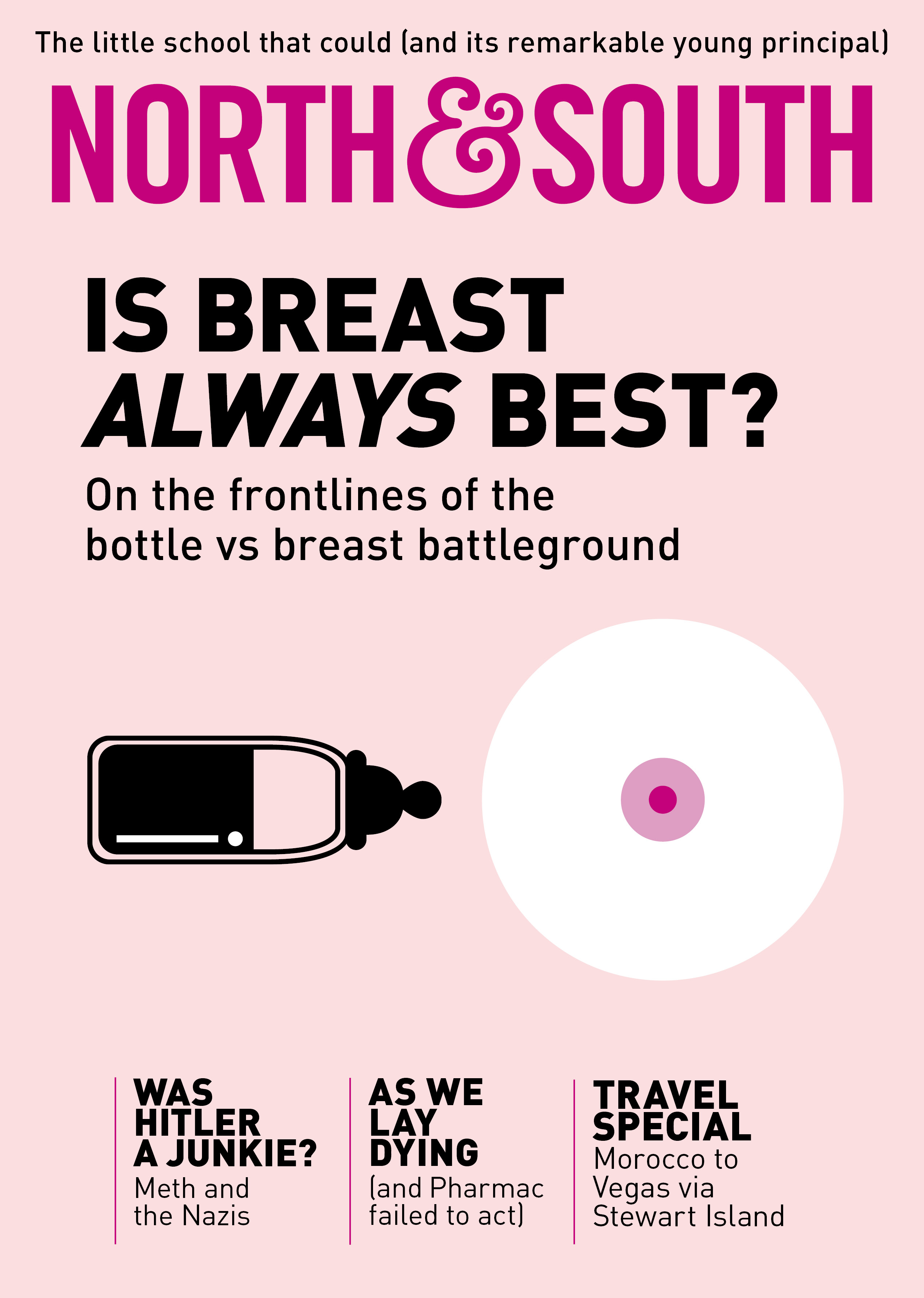
Feb 2018
