= Spiro Zavos =

New Zealand cricketer

Spiro Bernard Zavos (born 1937 in Wellington of Greek immigrant parents) is a New Zealand historian, philosopher, journalist and writer.

== Life and career ==
After gaining a Bachelor of Arts from the Victoria University of Wellington, Zavos taught history at St Patrick's College, Silverstream, in Wellington. An opening batsman, he played one first-class cricket match for Wellington in the 1958–59 season.

In 1967, Zavos gained a Master of Arts (Education) from The Catholic University of America in Washington, D.C. He then moved into journalism, working as a reporter at The Dominion newspaper in Wellington (now amalgamated into The Dominion Post). In 1976 he shared the New Zealand Feature Writer of the Year award with fellow journalist Warwick Roger, won for a series on New Zealand under Prime Minister Rob Muldoon.

The following year Zavos moved to Australia. In 1978 he was awarded the Katherine Mansfield Fellowship and spent a year in Menton, France, writing a collection of autobiographical short stories, which he later published under the title Faith of Our Fathers.

In 1979 he became an editorial writer on the Sydney Morning Herald, where he would remain until 2000. At the Herald, he also moved into rugby writing. Zavos has written more than 1000 articles for www.TheRoar.com.au, an Australian sports opinion website founded by his two sons.

He has written several books on rugby, and has contributed to Radio New Zealand as a sports analyst.

== Bibliography ==
- The Real Muldoon, Fourth Estate Books, 1978
- After the Final Whistle: Mourie's "Grand-Slam" All Blacks, and the Controversies, Personalities and Tactics of Post-war New Zealand Rugby, 1979
- Crusade: Social Credit's Drive for Power, 1981
- Faith of Our Fathers, 1982
- The Gold and the Black: The Rugby Battles for the Bledisloe Cup: New Zealand vs Australia, 1903-94, 1995
- Winters of Revenge: The Bitter Rivalry between the All Blacks and the Springboks, 1997
- Ka Mate! Ka Mate!: New Zealand's Conquest of British Rugby, 1998
- The Golden Wallabies: The Story of Australia's Rugby World Champions, 2000
- Two Mighty Tribes: The Story of the All Blacks vs the Wallabies 2003 (with Gordon Bray)
- Watching the Rugby World Cup, 2007
- How to Watch the Rugby World Cup 2011, 2011
- How to Watch a Game of Rugby, 2012
