= 1998 Invercargill mayoral election =

1998 mayoral election in Invercargill, New Zealand

- 10 October 1998
- Turnout: 26,651
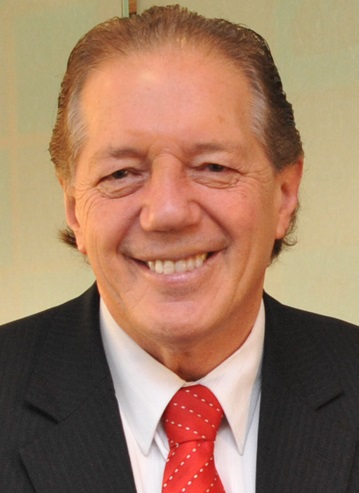

Candidate	Tim Shadbolt	David Harrington	Marion Miller
Party	Independent	Independent	Independent
Popular vote	13,805	8,052	3,899
Percentage	51.79	30.21	14.62
Mayor before election
David Harrington
Elected mayor
Tim Shadbolt

A mayoral election was held in Invercargill on 10 October 1998 as part of the 1998 New Zealand local elections, and was conducted under the First Past the Post system.

== Background ==
Former mayor Tim Shadbolt reclaimed the mayoralty he lost to David Harrington in the previous election. This was the beginning of a decades-long stint as mayor for Shadbolt. Shadbolt had considered contesting the Queenstown mayoralty before deciding to run in Invercargill again. Shadbolt once campaigned on Esk Street standing on a literal Lux soapbox. Harrington cleared out his desk two days before the election, apparently resigned to his impending loss.

== Polling ==
Poll source	Date	David Harrington	Tim Shadbolt
The Southland Times	October 1998	28.5%	45.6%

== Results ==
The following table gives the election results:

1998 Invercargill mayoral election
Party	Candidate	Votes	%	±%
Independent	Tim Shadbolt	13,805	51.79	+26.51
Independent	David Harrington	8,052	30.21	−25.64
Independent	Marion Miller	3,899	14.62	
Independent	Allan Johnstone	392	1.47	
Independent	Barry Hodge	383	1.43	+0.22
Independent	James Stapleforth	120	0.45	
Majority		5,753	21.58	
Turnout		26,651		
