= Tze Ming Mok =

New Zealand fiction writer, poet, essayist and political commentator

Tze Ming Mok (Chinese: 莫志明; pinyin: Mò Zhìmíng; born 1978) is a fiction writer and sociopolitical commentator, and has been a prominent New Zealand Asian community advocate.

== Biography ==
Mok was born in Auckland, New Zealand, growing up in the suburb of Mount Roskill. Her parents came to New Zealand in 1973 as international students studying medicine, and were originally from Singapore and Malaysia.

Mok received her degrees at the University of Auckland. She has an MA in political studies, with a thesis titled In the name of the Pacific: Theorising pan-Pacific identities in Aotearoa New Zealand. Mok works in human rights and development. She received her Doctor of Philosophy from the London School of Economics in 2019 with a thesis titled Inside the box: ethnic choice and ethnic change for mixed people in the United Kingdom.

Mok's most prominent period of advocacy for New Zealand Asian, migrant, and New Zealand Chinese communities was the period 2005–2007, during which time her ethnopolitical blog Yellow Peril was featured on the popular New Zealand group blog Public Address, and she wrote an opinion column on race relations and Asia-Pacific issues in New Zealand's national Sunday newspaper, The Sunday Star-Times.

In 2004, she led an anti-racist march to Parliament, Wellington, in response to hate crimes. In 2007, she and other Asian community leaders organised a successful New Zealand Press Council challenge of a magazine article that had been published in the national monthly magazine of note, North & South. The article, 'Asian Angst' by former Member of Parliament Deborah Coddington, was found to be inaccurate and racially discriminatory.

== Publication ==
Her poems, stories, reviews, opinions, and journalism have appeared in a range of publications including:

- The Kyoto Journal
- Landfall (including guest editorship of Autumn 2006 issue)
- The Sunday Star-Times (weekly column 2006)
- Sport
- Poetry NZ
- Meanjin
- JAAM
- The Listener
