= 2007 Invercargill mayoral election =

2007 mayoral election in Invercargill, New Zealand

- 13 October 2007
- Turnout: 18,773
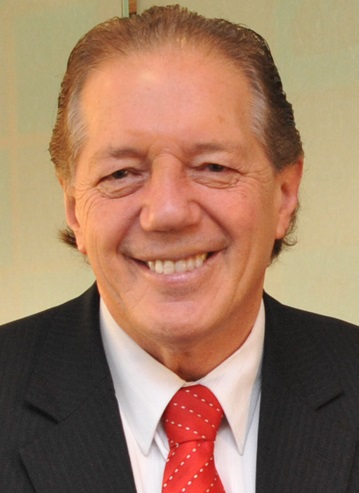

Candidate	Tim Shadbolt	Corey Vreugdenhil
Party	Independent	Independent
Popular vote	15,615	3,158
Percentage	83.17	16.83
Mayor before election
Tim Shadbolt
Elected mayor
Tim Shadbolt

The 2007 Invercargill mayoral election began on Saturday, 13 October 2007. It was conducted under the First Past the Post system using postal voting, and was held as part of the 2007 New Zealand local elections.

The incumbent mayor, Tim Shadbolt, was comfortably returned to his position with 83% of the vote.

== Results ==
The following table gives the election results:

2007 Invercargill mayoral election
Party	Candidate	Votes	%	±%
Independent	Tim Shadbolt	15,615	83.17	−1.48
Independent	Corey Vreugdenhil	3,158	16.83	
Majority		12,457	66.35	−3.67
Turnout		18,773		
