= 2016 Invercargill mayoral election =

2016 mayoral election in Invercargill, New Zealand

- 8 October 2016
- Turnout: 20,934 (54.9%)
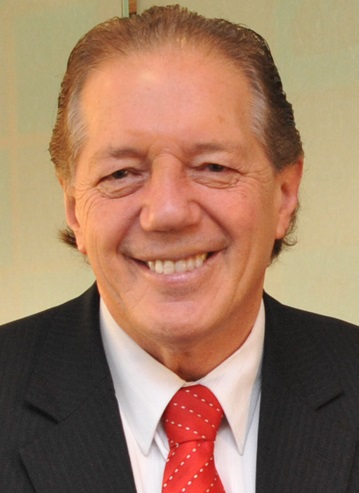

Candidate	Tim Shadbolt	Tom Conroy	Karen Arnold
Party	Independent	Independent	Independent
Popular vote	11,618	6,118	3,198
Percentage	55.49	29.22	15.27
Mayor before election
Tim Shadbolt
Elected mayor
Tim Shadbolt

The 2016 Invercargill mayoral election finished on Saturday, 8 October 2016 and was conducted under the first-past-the-post voting system using the postal voting system. It was held as part of the 2016 New Zealand local elections.

The incumbent mayor Tim Shadbolt sought a record eighth term, and was re-elected to the position with a reduced majority. Shadbolt was challenged by television host Tom Conroy and sitting Invercargill City councillor Karen Arnold. Shadbolt was re-elected with a decreased majority.

== Candidates ==
=== Declared candidates ===
- Karen Arnold, Invercargill City Councillor
- Tom Conroy, television host
- Tim Shadbolt, incumbent Mayor of Invercargill

=== Declined to be candidates ===
- Neil Boniface, Invercargill City Councillor
- Lindsay Dow, former Invercargill City Councillor and 2013 mayoral candidate (endorsed Conroy)
- Darren Ludlow, Deputy Mayor of Invercargill
- Ian Pottinger, Invercargill City Councillor (endorsed Arnold and Conroy)
- Penny Simmonds, chief executive of the Southern Institute of Technology

== Results ==
The following table gives the election results:

2016 Invercargill mayoral election
Party	Candidate	Votes	%	±%
Independent	Tim Shadbolt	11,618	55.49	−13.33
Independent	Tom Conroy	6,118	29.22	
Independent	Karen Arnold	3,198	15.27	
Majority		5,500	26.27	−14.41
Turnout		20,934	54.9	
