= 2004 Invercargill mayoral election =

2004 mayoral election in Invercargill, New Zealand

- 9 October 2004
- Turnout: 19,716
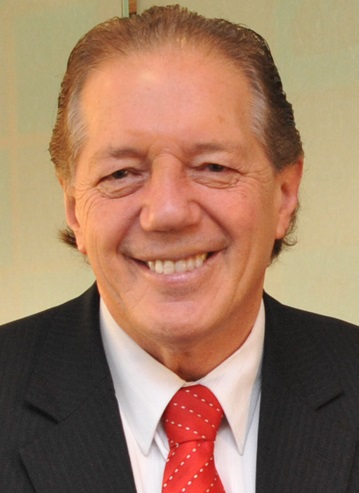

Candidate	Tim Shadbolt	Alan Swallow
Party	Independent	Independent
Popular vote	16,690	2,884
Percentage	84.65	14.62
Mayor before election
Tim Shadbolt
Elected mayor
Tim Shadbolt

The 2004 Invercargill mayoral election commenced on Saturday, 9 October 2004 and was conducted under the First Past the Post system using the postal voting system. It was held as part of the 2004 New Zealand local elections.

The incumbent mayor Tim Shadbolt was comfortably returned to his position with 84% of the vote.

== Results ==
The following table gives the election results:

2004 Invercargill mayoral election
Party	Candidate	Votes	%	±%
Independent	Tim Shadbolt	16,690	84.65	
Independent	Alan Swallow	2,884	14.62	
Informal votes		142	0.72	
Majority		13,806	70.02	
Turnout		19,716		
