= Nicola Legat =

New Zealand publisher and journalist

Nicola Legat ONZM
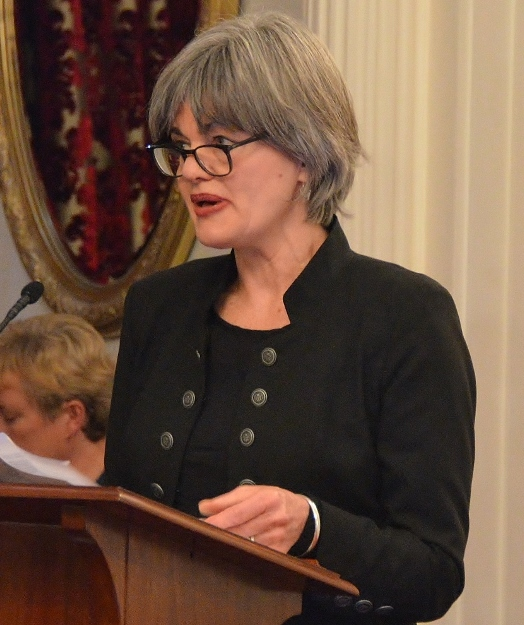
- Legat at the New Zealand Book Awards for Children and Young Adults 2015
- Occupation: Publisher
- Known for: Work at Massey University Press, Te Papa Press, North & South, Metro
- Website: Profile on Massey University website

Nicola Legat ONZM is a New Zealand publisher and journalist.

Legat is currently the publisher of Massey University Press (since 2015) and Te Papa Press (since 2016). Books published by the two presses have regularly been selected as New Zealand and Australia book awards finalists and winners.

Previously, Legat had a career as a journalist and editor in New Zealand magazines, including as senior writer for North & South and Metro. She later became Deputy Editor and then from 2001 to 2005 Editor of Metro. Prior to joining Massey University Press, Legat was for 10 years Publishing Director of Random House New Zealand, then New Zealand's largest domestic publisher.

Legat is also the chair of the New Zealand Book Awards Trust and deputy chair of the Auckland Readers and Writers Festival Trust.

Legat holds a MA Hons (First Class) from the University of Auckland. In May 2018, she was made an officer of the New Zealand Order of Merit for services to publishing.

== See also ==
- New Zealand literature
- Massey University
- Museum of New Zealand Te Papa Tongarewa
