= Lindsay Perigo =

New Zealand media personality

Lindsay Perigo (born 14 December 1951) is a New Zealand former television and radio broadcasting personality, founding member and first leader of the Libertarianz political party and a formerly-Objectivist organisation called Sense of Life Objectivists (SOLO).

In 1993 he quit television work, in the process denouncing TVNZ news and current affairs as "brain dead". Thereafter he returned to radio for several years, with a libertarian show on Radio Pacific and on the now defunct Radio Liberty.

Perigo is former editor of the Free Radical, a libertarian/Objectivist magazine founded by him with backing from David Henderson in 1994. Deborah Coddington, former Free Radical assistant editor, wrote a biography of Perigo entitled Politically Incorrect in 1999, which was published by Radio Pacific.

He is a noted fan of singer Mario Lanza, and in August 2013 a collection of his writings on Lanza's life and work was released called The One Tenor. He also wrote the foreword for Armando Cesari's Lanza biography, Mario Lanza: An American Tragedy. He has interviewed José Carreras and Luciano Pavarotti, and appeared with Dame Malvina Major in a television tribute to Pavarotti in September 2007.

A collection of his cultural and political commentaries was released in September 2012 titled The Total Passion for the Total Height.

== See also ==
- List of New Zealand television personalities
