= Metro (magazine) =

New Zealand lifestyle magazine

- Categories: Lifestyle
- Frequency: Quarterly
- Total circulation: 48,000 (2025)
- Founder: Bruce Palmer, Warwick Roger
- First issue: May 1981; 45 years ago
- Company: Metro Publications, Ltd. (1981–?); Australian Consolidated Press (?–2013); Bauer Media Group (2013–2020); Simon Chesterman (2020–2023); Still Group (2023–2026); Simon Farrell-Green and Hannah Kidd (2026–present)
- Country: New Zealand
- Based in: Auckland
- Language: English
- Website: metromag.co.nz
- ISSN: 0113-0668

Metro (previously published as Auckland Metro), is a New Zealand quarterly lifestyle magazine that covers society, arts, food, and city life in Auckland. Founded by Bruce Palmer and Warwick Roger in 1981, it was later acquired by Australian Consolidated Press, then under the control of Bauer Media Group, it briefly ceased publication in 2020 and since 2026 is under the control of Simon Farrell-Green and Hannah Kidd. As of 2026, publication is on pause and the magazine is without an editor.

== Background ==
=== Editors ===
Editor	Start year	End year
Warwick Roger	1981	1994
Bill Ralston	1997	2000
Warwick Roger	2000	2001
Nicola Legat	2001	2005
Lauren Quaintance	2005	2007
Bevan Rapson	2008	2010
Simon Wilson	2010	2015
Susannah Walker	2015	2019
Henry Oliver	2019	2025

== History ==
=== Origins ===
Metro was established in 1981. The debut of the magazine coincided with the rapid expansion of the New Zealand economy that occurred from 1984, following the election of the Fourth Labour Government, which implemented widespread neoliberal deregulation and economic reform. The increased access to imported luxury goods made Metro magazine an attractive media environment for advertisers.

From Metro 's ninth issue in March 1982 until 2002, the magazine featured an influential gossip column called Felicity Ferret. The writer was anonymous, although in May 2006 Auckland restaurant owner Fran Fisher told Metro that she had pitched the idea to editor Warwick Roger in 1982, and had contributed to it – along with Roger – until she left New Zealand in December 1983. The Ferret's initials hinted at her own name. While multiple writers were known to have written for the column over the years, after 1983 the Ferret was suspected to be largely the work of a former model and notorious Auckland socialite, Judith Baragwanath. In 1994, newspaper columnist Toni McRae sued Metro 's publishers over a reference to her in Felicity Ferret. A court awarded McRae damages of $375,000, later reduced to $100,000.

=== North and South ===
Metro magazine's success led to the launch of a sister title, North and South, edited by Robyn Langwell. This publication took a wider look at New Zealand regional stories. Langwell was editor of North & South until June 2007. A third title, the women's interest magazine More, was launched before the stable was bought by ACP Media, an Australian publishing consortium.

Both Metro and North & South have won awards for publishing and journalism and Metro, in particular, has been well known for its standard of photography and design under its art directors William Chen and Jenny Nicholls. This tradition is still strong, with Metro winning Best Art Director (Charlie McKay) at the 2010 Qantas Media Awards.

=== Bauer Media, 2013–2020 ===
ACP Media was the owner of Metro until 2013 when the magazine was acquired by Bauer Media Group. Metro's fortunes have varied since Warwick Roger gave up the editor's chair. The appointment of Bill Ralston saw dramatic shifts in the magazine's editorial focus away from the rigor of Roger's style to a more flamboyant, celebrity style format. Sales were disappointing and a period of decline followed.

The magazine was relaunched as a large format glossy title while led by Nicola Legat, a long-time contributing journalist. The changes were intended to reverse the decline of sales and readership. At its peak, Metro sold 40,000 copies, but this had fallen to less than 20,000. During this period the society scandal column Felicity Ferret was dropped from Metro's pages. The Ferret briefly returned to the pages of Metro in 2009.

In 2005, Legat left the magazine to join publishing company Random House. She was replaced by Lauren Quaintance, a former North and South writer, who oversaw a 5 per cent increase in circulation. Quaintance left in June 2007 to return to the Sydney Morning Herald and the long-serving deputy Bevan Rapson was appointed acting editor.

A makeover in 2009 saw Metro changed to a smaller size, and the incorporation of Citymix magazine within its pages.

In mid-2010, Rapson was replaced as editor by Simon Wilson, a Metro senior writer and former editor of Cuisine and Consumer, the magazine published by the Consumers' Institute of New Zealand. In 2010, Wilson oversaw a 25 per cent increase in Metro's readership, according to Nielsen Media Research. In August 2015 Susannah Walker became the editor of the magazine, replacing Simon Wilson in the post. Henry Oliver joined as editor in January 2019.

=== Changing hands, 2020–present ===
In early April 2020, the Bauer Media Group closed down Metro and several of its New Zealand operations in response to the economic effects of the COVID-19 pandemic in New Zealand. On 17 June 2020, Sydney investment firm Mercury Capital purchased Metro as part of its acquisition of Bauer Media's New Zealand and Australian media assets. On 17 July, Mercury Capital confirmed that it would be selling Metro to the independent publisher Simon Chesterman who formed Metro Media Group with editor Henry Oliver and others.

In November 2020, Metro returned to the newsstand as a bigger, bolder quarterly publication with an exclusive essay by Lorde about her travels to Antarctica. In May 2023, Metro Media Group was sold to Auckland-based investment firm Still, owned by Hideki Fukushima, whose family was included in the NBR Rich List with an estimated family wealth of $1.6 billion.

Henry Oliver served as editor until mid October 2025. Metro chairperson and Still's projects director Sam Johnson announced that the company would hire several guest editors to edit Metro until it could afford to hire full-time staff.

In mid March 2026, after just one issue under Johnson's leadership, Metro announced that it would end regular print production and transition to becoming an online publication. Subscribers were asked to forfeit unfulfilled subscription fees to contribute towards "protecting and preserving" the magazine's archives, with a goal of raising $10,000. In June 2026, despite claiming to have a "300 year outlook", Still sold the title to Simon Farrell-Green and Hannah Kidd, publishers of Here magazine.
