= David Harrington (New Zealand politician) =

New Zealand politician (1936–2009)

43rd Mayor of Invercargill
- In office 1995–1998
- Preceded by: Tim Shadbolt
- Succeeded by: Tim Shadbolt

Personal details
- Born: 10 March 1936 Invercargill, New Zealand
- Died: 20 May 2009 (aged 73) Dunedin, New Zealand
- Resting place: Eastern Cemetery, Invercargill
- Spouse: Patricia Catherine Harrington (m. 1958)
- Children: 6

David Francis Edward Harrington JP (10 March 1936 – 20 May 2009) was a New Zealand politician who served as Mayor of Invercargill from 1995 to 1998.

== Early life ==
Harrington was born in Invercargill on 10 March 1936 to Richard and Millicent Harrington. He attended St Catherine's, St Theresa's, and Marist Brothers High School. He soon after began working for the Southland Building Society. In 1958 he married Patricia, and they went on to have six children.

== Political career ==
In 1983 Harrington was elected to the Invercargill Licensing Trust. He served as chairman from 1986 to 1995, and left the board in 1998.

After choosing not to run for mayor in the 1993 by-election, he was elected mayor in 1995, defeating the incumbent Tim Shadbolt handily. His mayoralty coincided with economic hard times which, combined with health problems, contributed to his loss to Shadbolt in the 1998 election. Much of the work he did for the city during his term did not manifest until after his defeat.

== Death ==
Harrington died in Dunedin on 20 May 2009 after a short illness and surgery. He is buried in Invercargill's Eastern Cemetery alongside his wife who died in 2019.

Political offices
| Preceded by Tim Shadbolt | Mayor of Invercargill; 1995–1998 | Succeeded by Tim Shadbolt |
