= 1995 Invercargill mayoral election =

1995 mayoral election in Invercargill, New Zealand

- 14 October 1995
- Turnout: 25,507 (66%)

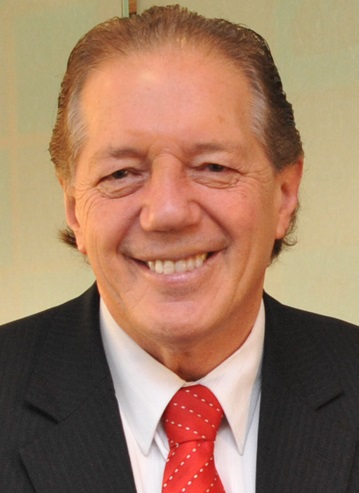
Candidate	David Harrington	Tim Shadbolt
Party	Independent	Independent
Popular vote	14,247	6,449
Percentage	55.85	25.28
Mayor before election
Tim Shadbolt
Elected mayor
David Harrington

The 1995 Invercargill mayoral election was held on 14 October 1995 as part of the 1995 New Zealand local elections, and was conducted under the First Past the Post system.

== Background ==
Incumbent mayor Tim Shadbolt had been elected in a 1993 by-election as a result of the death of Eve Poole in 1992. His re-election bid was unsuccessful, with ILT chairman David Harrington getting more than double his number of votes. This was seen as part of a wave of conservatism in the south. With 50% of the vote counted, Shadbolt conceded at 7 pm that night. After his loss Shadbolt promised to run again in the next election.

== Polling ==
Poll source	Date(s) administered	Sample size	Margin of error	David Harrington	Lou Harrison-Smith	Lindsay Hazley	Barry Hodge	Terry King	Don Mowat	Tim Shadbolt	Undecided
The Southland Times	25–28 September 1995	506	± 4.4%	34.19%	2.57%	4.94%	0.79%	1.58%	5.34%	19.37%	29.64%

== Results ==
The following table gives the election results:

1995 Invercargill mayoral election
Party	Candidate	Votes	%	±%
Independent	David Harrington	14,247	55.85	
Independent	Tim Shadbolt	6,449	25.28	−8.07
Independent	Don Mowat	1,821	7.13	
Independent	Lindsay Hazley	1,560	6.11	
Independent	Lou Harrison-Smith	609	2.38	
Independent	Terry King	510	1.99	
Independent	Barry Hodge	311	1.21	
Majority		7,798	30.57	
Turnout		25,507	66	−13.45
