= Tim Shadbolt =

New Zealand politician (1947–2026)

Sir Tim Shadbolt KNZM JP
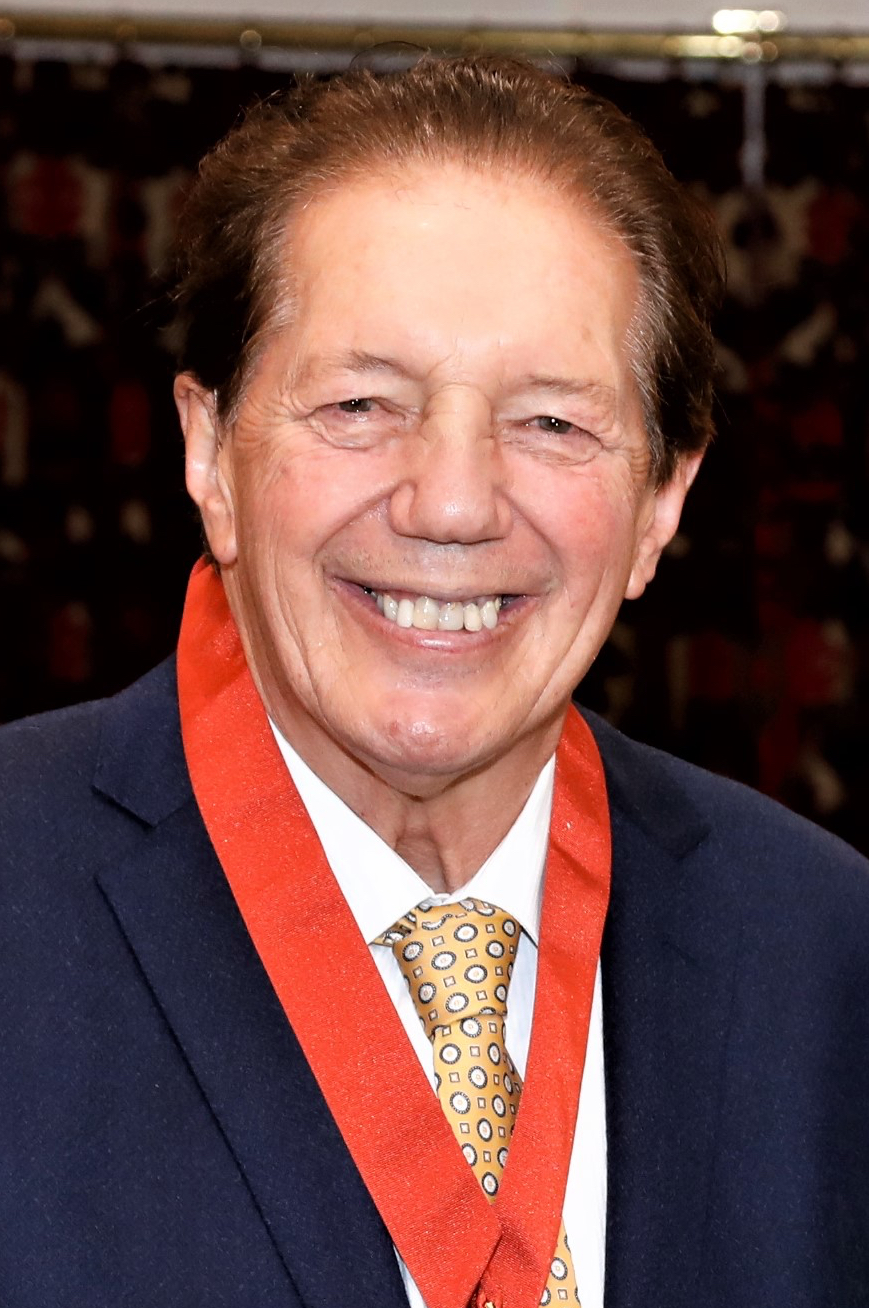
- Shadbolt in 2019

42nd Mayor of Invercargill
- In office 1998–2022
- Preceded by: David Harrington
- Succeeded by: Nobby Clark
- In office 1993–1995
- Preceded by: Eve Poole
- Succeeded by: David Harrington

35th Mayor of Waitemata City
- In office 1983–1989
- Preceded by: Tony Covic

Personal details
- Born: 19 February 1947 Remuera, Auckland, New Zealand
- Died: 8 January 2026 (aged 78)
- Party: Independent
- Other political affiliations: Aotearoa Legalise Cannabis (late 1990s); New Zealand First (mid 1990s)
- Spouse: Miriam Cameron (m. 1976; div. 1992)
- Domestic partner: Asha Dutt
- Relations: Maurice Shadbolt (cousin)
- Children: 4

Sir Timothy Richard Shadbolt KNZM JP (19 February 1947 – 8 January 2026) was a New Zealand politician. Having been an activist in his youth, he went on to serve as mayor of Waitemata City from 1983 to 1989 and then to serve as mayor of Invercargill from 1993 to 1995 and 1998 to 2022; during his term as the latter he became a national icon and a major figure of the city. His term as mayor of both cities extending over 32 years made him one of the longest-serving mayors in New Zealand history.

== Early life ==
Shadbolt was born in the Auckland suburb of Remuera on 19 February 1947. His father died in a flying accident in 1952. He was on the school council and appointed prefect. Shadbolt became a founding student of Rutherford College, Auckland, and attended the University of Auckland from 1966 to 1970, taking a year off in 1967 to work on the Manapouri Power Project in Southland. He was a member of the Auckland University Students Association executive, and editor of Craccum in 1972.

== Activism ==
During the late 1960s and early 1970s, he became prominent in the Progressive Youth Movement, a radical left-wing organisation, and was arrested 33 times during political protests.

In the mid-1970s, he founded a commune and concrete cooperative at Huia, later moving to Glen Eden with his family.

== Local politics ==
=== Waitemata mayoralty ===
Shadbolt claimed he stood for Mayor of Waitemata City in 1983 because he did not want to see the incumbent Tony Covic re-elected unopposed. He won the election, receiving 1,200 more votes than Covic. He famously celebrated, much to some people's disgust, by towing his concrete mixer (named "Karl Marx") behind the mayoral Daimler in the 1983 Henderson Christmas parade. Shadbolt's election represented the deep cynicism that many voters had felt about the Waitemata City Council, which was known for in-fighting.

In 1986, Shadbolt created Tim's Team, a political ticket of young, liberal councillors. Shadbolt's re-election was widely successful, improving voter turnout in 1980 from 16% of voters to 70% in 1986; the highest ever turnout for a local election in New Zealand. During this three-year term, Shadbolt connected Titirangi and Laingholm to the city's main sewage system. Shadbolt envisioned a large-scale stadium located on undeveloped coastal land at Te Atatū Peninsula called the Kiwi Dome, as a way to develop the economy of Waitemata City, which was never developed. During his term as mayor he became infamous by twice losing the mayoral chains.

In October 1988, Shadbolt's deputy mayor Gary Taylor resigned, citing mismanagement and personal issues as reasons, describing Shadbolt as an "Emperor" of a "personal fiefdom". This triggered an audit by the central government, which found evidence of cronyism and improper management of funds, however not as wide-spread as alleged by Taylor.

Six months after the release of the report, an election was held for the new Waitakere City, a newly formed body composed of the Waitemata City and surrounding West Auckland borough councils. In part due to the controversy, Shadbolt lost to Assid Corban, a member of the Corban family and mayor of the former Henderson Borough Council.

He stood in the electorate of West Auckland (which incorporated Waitemata) at the 1990 New Zealand general election as an independent. He placed fifth with 3.06 per cent of the vote. Later that year, he unsuccessfully stood in a by-election for Mayor of Auckland City, polling a distant eighth place. Two years later he stood again for Mayor of Auckland City and also for Mayor of Dunedin, where he finished third place in both elections but performed marginally better in Dunedin. Later that year, he stood in the Wellington Central by-election as an independent candidate, polling less than half a percentage point.

=== Invercargill mayoralties ===
In 1993, Shadbolt ran successfully for the position of Mayor of Invercargill. In 1994, he contested the Selwyn by-election as a candidate for New Zealand First, but was placed fourth, and remained Mayor of Invercargill. He was defeated in 1995. In the 1996 general election he stood unsuccessfully as a candidate for the Aotearoa Legalise Cannabis Party.

In 1998, Shadbolt was re-elected to the mayoralty and remained the mayor until 2022. In 2001 he was re-elected unopposed.

In October 2002, Shadbolt told a conference of New Zealand's Disabled Persons Assembly that Invercargill had "an innovative approach to public transport, currently centred on 'Freebie the Bus' travelling the 'Purple Circle'". He said he hoped that in future all buses in Invercargill would be free and accessible. (The Freebie and Purple Circle are zero-fare bus routes in Invercargill.)

In 2004 and 2007, Shadbolt won his fourth and fifth mayoral terms by huge margins. In 2010, he won his sixth Invercargill mayoral election. Shadbolt received 16,466 votes over mayoral candidates Suzanne Prentice (5,361 votes) and Carl Heenan (682 votes).

On 8 October 2016 he again won re-election as Invercargill's mayor. He said this was his toughest campaign yet. "I've had two candidates both going flat-out and it was a tough election", he said. "In the past I've had either no contenders, but this time I had a television producer and a sitting councillor who had also been an investigative journalist, so it was pretty tough opposition."

Shadbolt was returned for another term in 2019. In November 2020, however, an independent review of the Invercargill City Council commissioned by the Department of Internal Affairs raised concerns about the council's performance, and in particular said Shadbolt was "struggling to fulfil significant aspects of his job", and as a result there is a leadership void at the council. Shadbolt rubbished the report, saying it is flawed and he has been singled out as a scapegoat.

In mid-August 2021, Deputy Mayor of Invercargill Nobby Clark pushed for a vote of no confidence in Shadbolt's leadership. Shadbolt had drawn criticism from fellow councillors for using Invercargill City Council (ICC) properties to store his personal belongings. In response, Shadbolt alleged that he was the victim of workplace bullying and criticised the leaking of a mayoral email to the media.

On 17 August, it was reported that Invercargill City Council CEO Clare Hadley had illegally accessed an email written by Shadbolt and used it against him during a closed council meeting. Following her apology, Shadbolt and councillors also welcomed an external investigation into the email leak. An informal survey conducted by the Otago Daily Times found that 82% of respondents (157 individuals) believed that Shadbolt should resign as Mayor of Invercargill.

In mid-July 2022, Shadbolt was involved in a dispute with Deputy Mayor Clark over whether the Council should cover his rental car expenses when attending a Local Government New Zealand conference in Palmerston North. Shadbolt argued that he was entitled to financial support from the ICC since he was representing Invercargill ratepayers in his capacity as Mayor. Clark contended that Shadbolt should pay for the rental car expenses himself as he had previously done in 2021.

In mid-September 2022, Shadbolt attracted media attention when he abstained from participating in the Southland Business Chamber's mayoral debate during the 2022 Invercargill mayoral election. Shadbolt instead issued a statement stating that "After nine terms in office, you should be well aware of my strengths and weaknesses. It is for my challengers to take up the gauntlet and prove themselves to you." On 8 October, he lost the election with 847 votes; former deputy mayor Nobby Clark won with 6537.

== Other endeavours ==
=== Television ===
Shadbolt had numerous appearances on New Zealand television, including the series That's Fairly Interesting. He appeared in an advertisement promoting New Zealand cheese in the 1990s, repeating the phrase "I don't care where, as long as I'm mayor", in reference to his dual mayoralties. He admitted later that the phrase was developed by an advertising agency.

He appeared as a contestant on several game shows, including The Weakest Link in 2001, the New Zealand version of Dancing with the Stars where he placed 3rd, and the comedy gameshow 7 Days as a guest participant in the round Yes, Minister.

In 2012, Shadbolt set the Guinness World Record for the longest television interview. He was interviewed for 26 consecutive hours by interviewer Tom Conroy on Cue TV. In doing so the pair also set the record for the longest single event in New Zealand television history. Shadbolt later said he would have liked to keep going. The record was broken in 2013 by Norwegian novelist Hans Olav Lahlum.

=== Film ===
Shadbolt appeared in The World's Fastest Indian, portraying a good friend of Burt Munro who organised social events for Invercargill's motorcycling community.

== Honours and awards ==
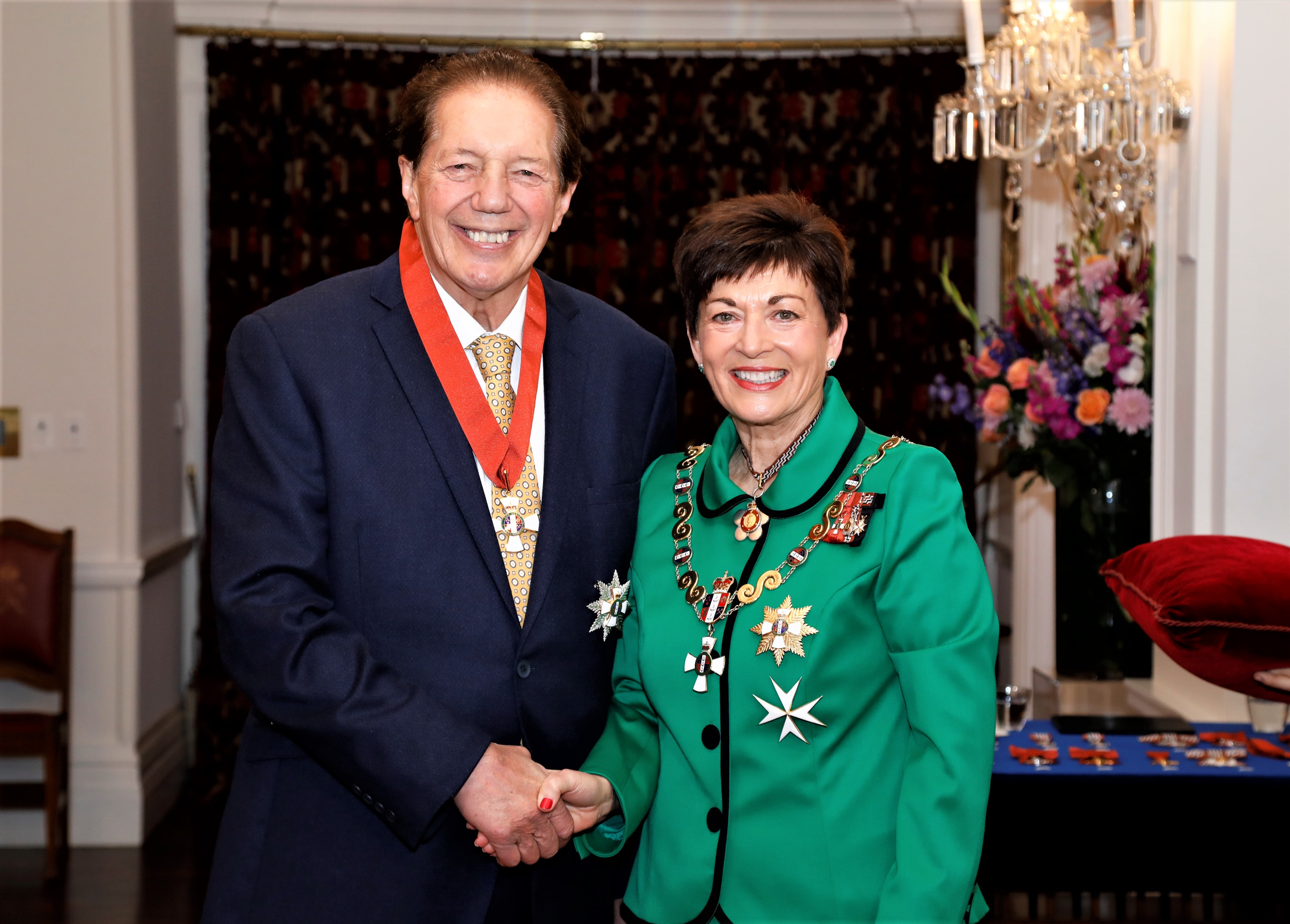
Shadbolt with then Governor-General Patsy Reddy in 2019

In 2005, New Zealand Toastmasters awarded him the Communicator of the Year award.

He was knighted in the 2019 New Year Honours List as a Knight Companion of the New Zealand Order of Merit (KNZM).

== Personal life ==
=== Family ===
Shadbolt had one son from an early marriage. He met his second wife, Miriam Cameron, in 1970. They had two sons. Cameron left Shadbolt in 1989 after alleged repeated domestic violence. They divorced three years later. Shadbolt's later partner was lawyer Asha Dutt and they had one son.

=== Legal problems ===
In June 2015, the Invercargill City councillor Karen Arnold filed a defamation case against Shadbolt and Stuff media company (then known as Fairfax New Zealand) at the Wellington High Court, alleging that Shadbolt had defamed her in four columns published in the Fairfax–owned Southland Times newspaper between October 2014 and April 2015. Shadbolt and Arnold had clashed about the Invercargill City Council's holding company Holdco borrowing an extra NZ$130 million but then declining to invest in a kākāpō centre. Following a three week trial between February and March 2018 at the Invercargill High Court, the jury rejected Arnold's claims that Shadbolt and Stuff had defamed her on 18 March 2018. Shadbolt welcomed the ruling as a victory for freedom of expression.

Following the defamation, Arnold was ordered to pay both Stuff and Shadbolt NZ$186,000 but declared bankruptcy. In March 2020, Shadbolt tried to get the Invercargill City Council to cover $448,000 worth of expenses incurred during his defamation trial under an indemnity clause in the Local Government Act. When the Council and insurance company rejected his application, Shadbolt sued the ICC. By late September 2020, Newshub reported that Shadbolt was facing bankruptcy, owing over NZ$350,000 in legal fees.

On 14 February 2023, Shadbolt settled his claims against the Invercargill City Council and its insurer Riskpool. By that time, the council had incurred NZ$285,000 in legal fees as a result of the proceedings. Shadbolt welcomed the settlement, stating that it had ended "eight years of hell" and that he had mixed emotions.

=== Health and death ===
Shadbolt was hospitalised for two weeks in April 2006 after rolling the mayoral car near Winton while returning from a work trip to Queenstown. He suffered three broken vertebrae, a bruised lung, and damage to his kidneys. His two passengers were uninjured. He was charged with careless driving and could have faced a maximum fine of $3000, however he was instead discharged and ordered to pay $300 each to St John New Zealand and the Winton volunteer fire brigade.

In June 2021, Shadbolt revealed that he had been diagnosed with muscle tension dysphonia. He died on 8 January 2026, at the age of 78. A public funeral service was held for him on 16 January at the Civic Theatre; there was a procession followed by a private burial.

Political offices
Preceded by Tony Covic	Mayor of Waitemata City; 1983–1989	Office abolished
Preceded by Eve Poole	Mayor of Invercargill; 1993–1995; 1998–2022	Succeeded by David Harrington
Preceded by David Harrington	Mayor of Invercargill; 1993–1995; 1998–2022	Succeeded by Nobby Clark
Awards and achievements
Preceded by Show started	Dancing with the Stars (New Zealand) third place contestant Season 1 (2005 with Rebecca Nicholson)	Succeeded by Danyon Loader & Hayley Holt
