= 1993 Invercargill mayoral by-election =

1993 by-election in Invercargill, New Zealand

- 20 March 1993
- Turnout: 30,211 (79.45%)
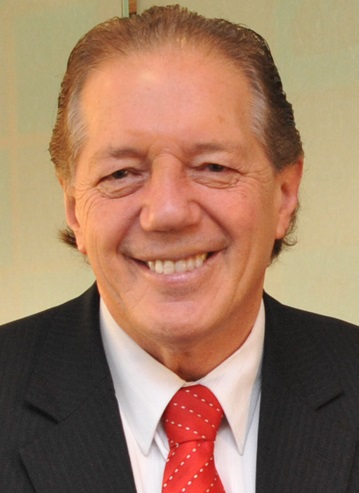

Candidate	Tim Shadbolt	Bruce Pagan	Mark Winter
Party	Independent	Independent	Independent
Popular vote	10,078	5,752	4,795
Percentage	33.35	19.03	15.87
Candidate	Mirek Cvigr	Dougal Soper
Party	Independent	Independent
Popular vote	3,915	1,972
Percentage	12.95	6.52
Mayor before election
Dougal Soper (acting)
Elected mayor
Tim Shadbolt

The 1993 Invercargill mayoral by-election was held on 20 March 1993 as a result of the death of Mayor Eve Poole on Boxing Day the previous year.

== Background ==
Since losing the Waitemata City mayoralty in 1989, Tim Shadbolt had made several unsuccessful electoral runs, including 1992 mayoral elections in Auckland and Dunedin, in both of which he placed third.

The election attracted an unusually large pool of 14 candidates, including the incumbent deputy mayor and the two deputy mayors preceding him. Former Southland County Council chairman and father of candidate Janet Malloch, Sir Erskine Bowmar, described it as "a bit of a joke".

== Polling ==
Poll source	Date(s) administered	Sample size	Margin of error	Neil Boniface	Mirek Cvigr	Janet Malloch	Bruce Pagan	Geoff Piercy	Tim Shadbolt	Dougal Soper	Anne Stoddart	Mark Winter	Undecided
The Southland Times	1 March 1993	519	± 4.5%	2%	8.86%	4.24%	12.91%	3.47%	21.39%	7.13%	3.47%	6.94%	22%
The Southland Times	10 March 1993	615	± 4.5%	1.6%	8.9%	3.4%	16.1%	2.4%	26.2%	5.8%	1.6%	10.2%	17%

== Results ==
The following table gives the election results:

1993 Invercargill mayoral by-election
Party	Candidate	Votes	%	±%
Independent	Tim Shadbolt	10,078	33.35	
Independent	Bruce Pagan	5,752	19.03	−16.16
Independent	Mark Winter	4,795	15.87	
Independent	Mirek Cvigr	3,915	12.95	−13.96
Independent	Dougal Soper	1,972	6.52	
Independent	Geoff Piercy	1,221	4.04	
Independent	Janet Malloch	765	2.53	
Independent	Anne Stoddart	718	2.37	
Independent	Neil Boniface	416	1.37	
Independent	Marjory Jones	268	0.88	
Independent	George Ngatai	116	0.38	
Independent	Katherine Hart	55	0.18	
Independent	Richard Osborn	50	0.16	
Independent	Owen Houliston	42	0.13	
Majority		4,326	14.32	
Turnout		30,211	79.45	
