= Warwick Roger =

New Zealand journalist (1945–2018)

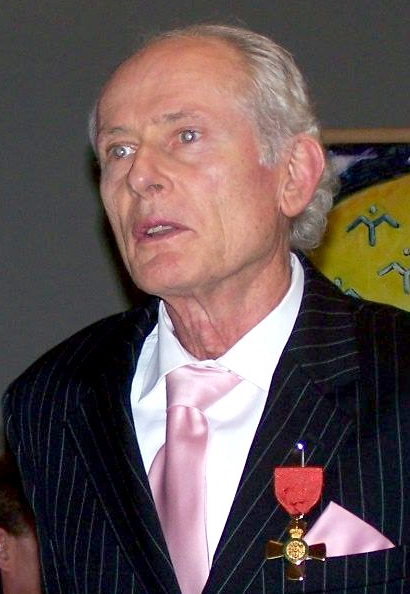
Roger in 2008

Warwick George Roger ONZM (21 August 1945 – 17 August 2018) was a New Zealand journalist who founded Metro magazine. In the 2008 Queen's Birthday Honours, Roger was appointed an Officer of the New Zealand Order of Merit, for services to journalism. Roger died of Parkinson's disease in 2018 at the age of 72.
