= Mass media in New Zealand =

The mass media in New Zealand include television stations, radio stations, newspapers, magazines, and websites. Media conglomerates like NZME, Stuff, MediaWorks, and Sky dominate the media landscape. Most media organisations operate Auckland-based newsrooms with Parliamentary Press Gallery reporters and international media partners, but most broadcast programmes, music and syndicated columns are imported from the United States and United Kingdom.

The media of New Zealand predominantly use New Zealand English, but Community Access and several local other outlets provide news and entertainment for linguistic minorities. Following a Waitangi Tribunal decision in the 1990s, the Government has accepted a responsibility to promote the Māori language through Te Māngai Pāho funding of the Māori Television Service, the Te Whakaruruhau o Nga Reo Irirangi Māori and other outlets. NZ On Air funds public service programming on the publicly owned Television New Zealand and Radio New Zealand, and on community-owned and privately owned broadcasters.

== Censorship ==
The 2025 World Press Freedom Index puts New Zealand in the 2nd highest category for press freedom.

There is limited censorship in New Zealand of political expression, violence or sexual content. The World Press Freedom Index rates New Zealand well for press freedom, ranking it sixteenth-best worldwide in 2025, up from nineteenth in 2024, and down from fifth in 2016.

The country's libel laws follow the English model, and contempt of court is severely punished. The Office of Film and Literature Classification classifies and sometimes censors films, videos, publications and video games, the New Zealand Press Council deals with print media bias and inaccuracy and the Broadcasting Standards Authority and Advertising Standards Authority considers complaints.

The Department of Internal Affairs is responsible for Internet censorship in New Zealand and runs a voluntary filtering system to prevent Internet users from accessing selected sites and material that contain sexual abuse or exploitation of children and young people. Internet censorship in Australia is more extensive, and New Zealand has refused to follow suit.

== Traditional media ==
=== Television ===
Television in New Zealand was introduced in 1960. Initially broadcasting from four separate stations in Auckland, Wellington, Christchurch and Dunedin, television was networked nationwide in 1969. Colour television was introduced in 1973, and a second channel was launched in 1975. Provision was first made for the licensing of private radio and television stations in New Zealand by the Broadcasting Act 1976, although the first private television channel didn't launch until 1989.

Satellite services are provided nationwide by Freeview and Sky, a terrestrial service provided in the main centres by Freeview, and an internet service provided by Vodafone. There are currently 20 national free-to-air channels, 24 regional free-to-air stations and several pay TV networks. Programming and scheduling is done in Auckland where all the major networks are now headquartered.

The first nationwide digital TV service was launched in December 1998 by Sky Network Television, who had a monopoly on digital satellite TV until the launch of Freeview's nationwide digital satellite service in May 2007. The Freeview terrestrial service is a high definition digital terrestrial television service launched on 14 April 2008, initially serving Auckland, Hamilton, Tauranga, Napier-Hastings, Palmerston North, Wellington, Christchurch, and Dunedin. This was later expanded to include more regions. Broadband television is currently operated from Vodafone, The Vodafone service includes all Freeview channels and allows customers to add Sky channel packages to their accounts, through a wholesale deal with Sky. High Definition programming is available from Freeview on terrestrial broadcast only and on Sky.

=== Radio ===
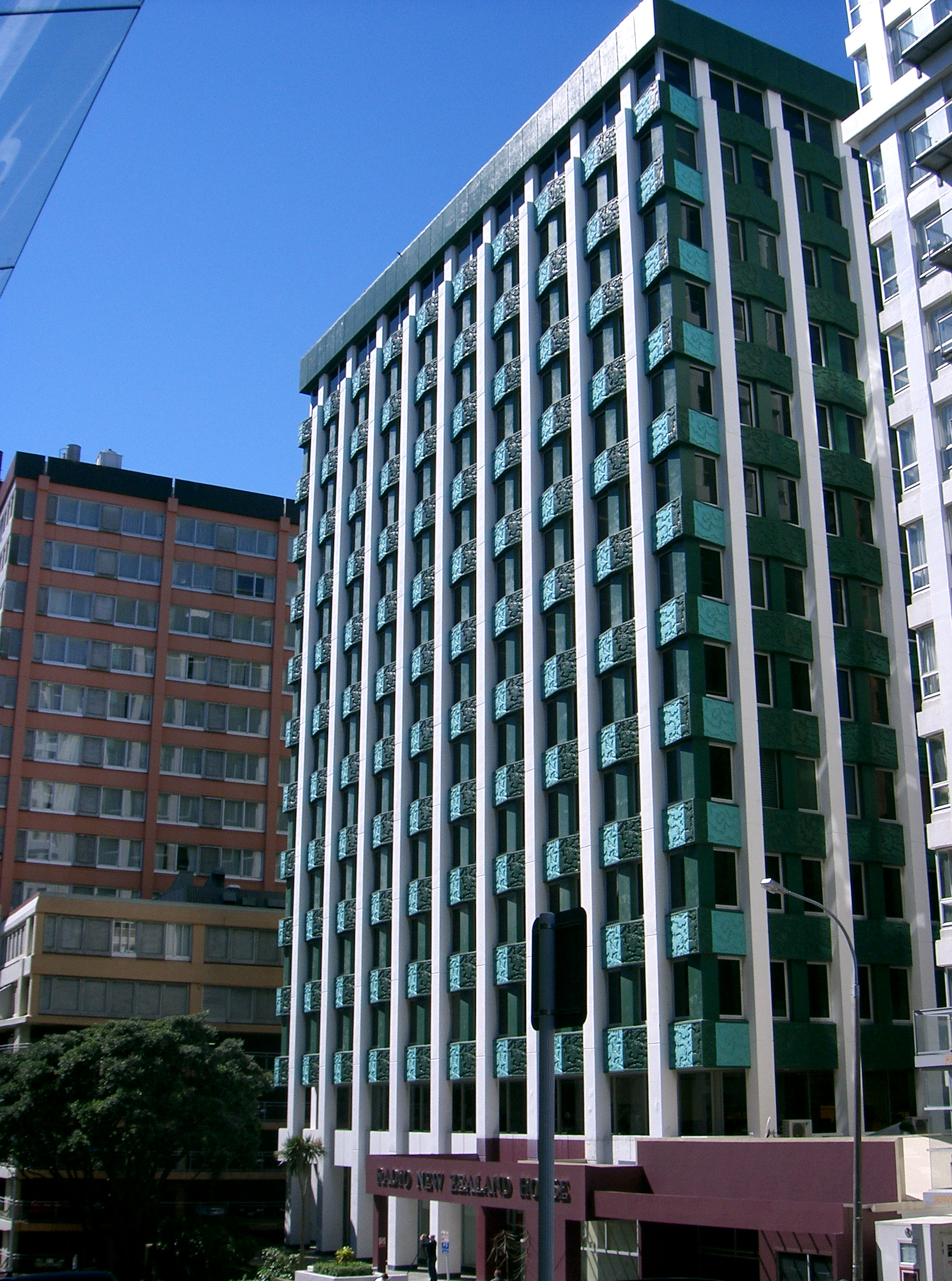
Radio New Zealand headquarters in Wellington

New Zealand has twenty-seven radio stations. Radio New Zealand operates four public service networks: the flagship Radio New Zealand National, the classical music network Radio New Zealand Concert, the Pacific shortwave service Radio New Zealand International and the Parliamentary broadcasters AM Network.

NZME Radio operates music station Coast, hip-hop station Flava, rock station Radio Hauraki, 80s and 90s station Mix 98.2, talk network Newstalk ZB, sports network Radio Sport, pop station The Hits and youth station ZM.

MediaWorks New Zealand operates dance station George FM, Hip Hop & RnB station Mai FM, pop station More FM, classic rock station The Sound, easy-listening station Breeze and its slightly older counterpart Breeze Classic, Golden Oldies station Magic, current hits station The Edge, rock station The Rock, and Hindi station Humm FM.

Rhema Media operates four evangelical Christian networks. Most student networks belong to the Student Radio Network and most public access broadcasters belong to the Association of Community Access Broadcasters. The Iwi Radio Network is funded by Te Māngai Pāho and the Pacific Media Network is predominantly funded by NZ On Air.

=== Print media ===
The number of newspapers in New Zealand has dramatically declined since the early 20th century as a consequence of radio, television and new media being introduced to the country. Auckland's The New Zealand Herald serves the upper North Island, Wellington's The Dominion Post serves the lower North Island and Canterbury's The Press and Dunedin's Otago Daily Times serve the South Island.

Provincial and community newspapers, such as the Waikato Times daily, serve particular regions, cities and suburbs. Ownership of New Zealand newspapers is dominated by Stuff and New Zealand Media and Entertainment with Stuff (formerly Fairfax) having 48.6% of the daily newspaper circulation. Local and overseas tabloids and magazines cover food, current affairs, personal affairs, gardening and home decor, and business or appeal to gay, lesbian, ethnic and rural communities.

In early April 2020, German media company Bauer Media Group announced the closure of several of its New Zealand brands including Woman's Day, New Zealand Woman's Weekly, the New Zealand Listener, The Australian Women's Weekly, North & South, Next, Metro, Air New Zealand's inflight magazine Kia Ora, and Your Home & Garden in response to the COVID-19 pandemic in New Zealand.

=== Literature ===
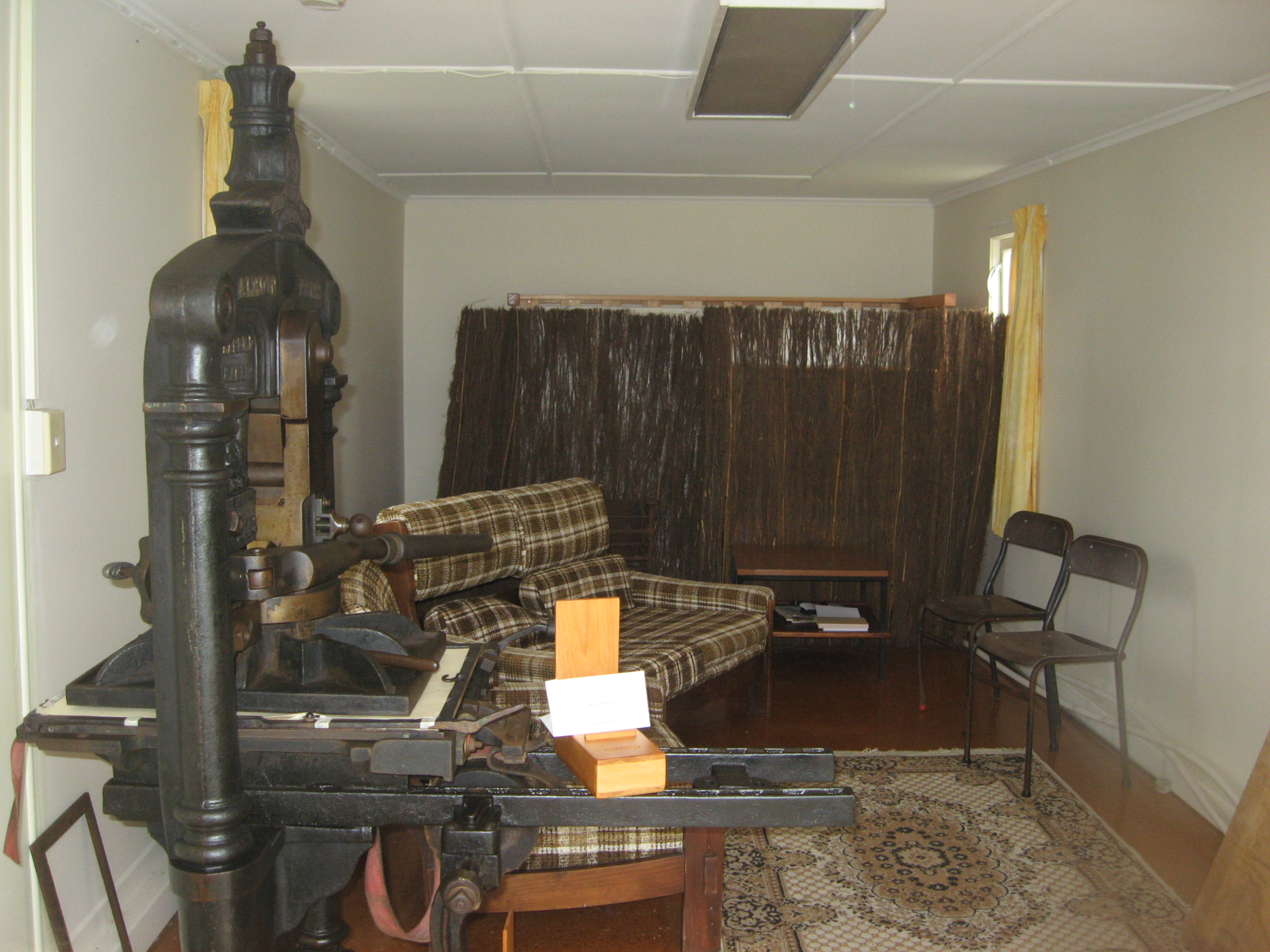
An early New Zealand printer used by CMS Paihia to publish Bibles during the 19th century

Māori in New Zealand had non-literate culture before contact with the Europeans in the early 19th century, but oratory recitation of quasi-historical and hagiographical ancestral blood lines was central to the culture; oral traditions were first published when early 19th century Christian missionaries developed a written form of the Māori language to publish Bibles. The literature of New Zealand includes many works written in English and Māori by New Zealanders and migrants during the 20th and 21st centuries.

Novelists include Patricia Grace, Albert Wendt and Maurice Gee; children's authors include Margaret Mahy. Keri Hulme won the Booker Prize for The Bone People; Witi Ihimaera's novel Whale Rider, which dealt with Māori life in the modern world, ' became a Nikki Caro film.

Migrant writers include South African-born Robin Hyde; expatriate writers like Dan Davin and Katherine Mansfield often wrote about the country. Samuel Butler stayed in New Zealand and set his novel Erewhon in the country. Karl Wolfskehl prepared works of German literature during a sojourn in Auckland. New Zealand's lively community of playwrights, supported by Playmarket, include Roger Hall.

=== Film ===
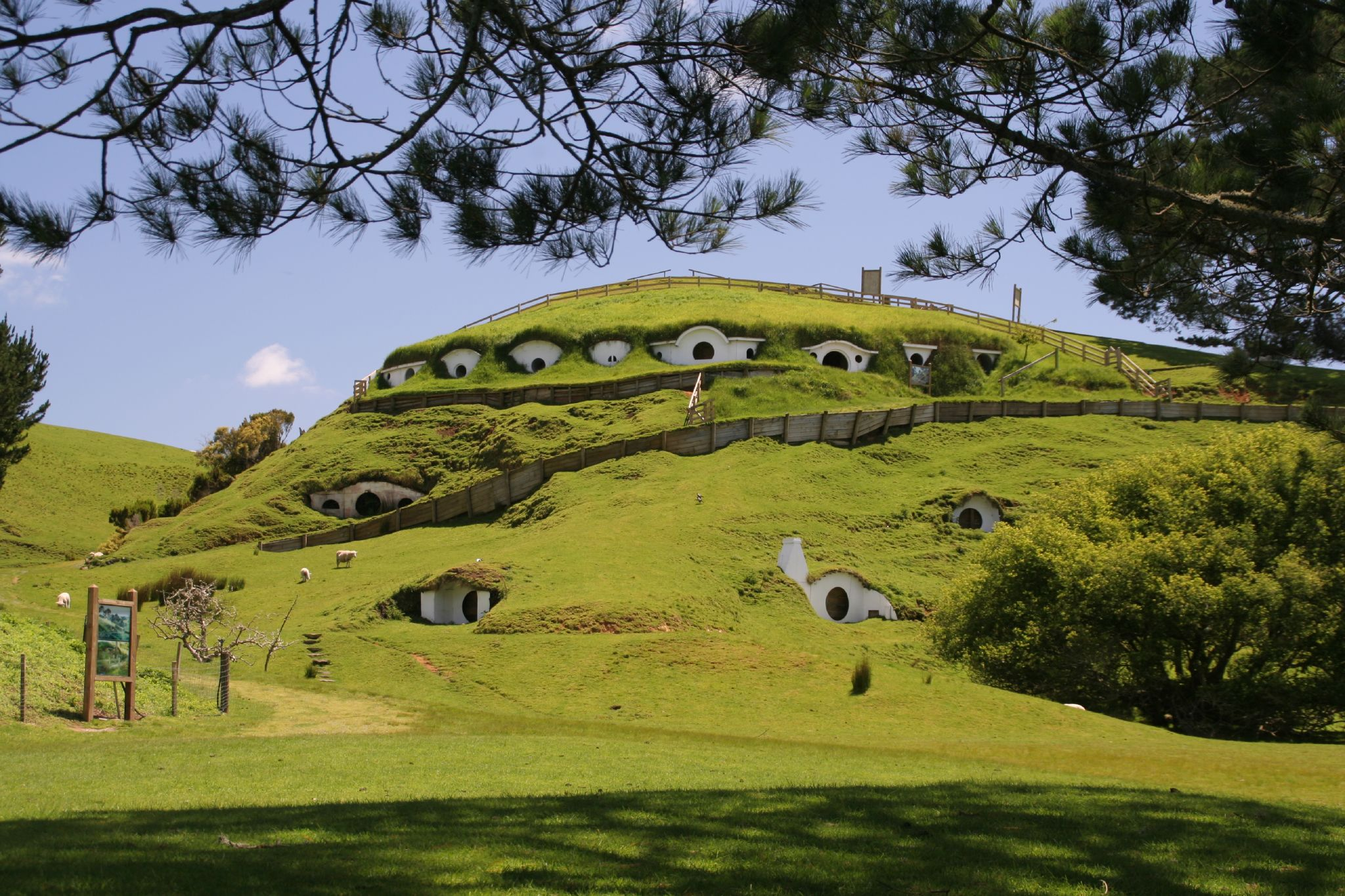
A farm near the town of Matamata in the Waikato stood in for Hobbiton in the Lord of the Rings series.

The New Zealand film industry is small but successful, boasting directors such as Peter Jackson and Jane Campion. The cinema of New Zealand includes many films made in New Zealand, made about New Zealand or made by New Zealand-based production companies. Peter Jackson's The Lord of the Rings film trilogy was produced and filmed in New Zealand, and animation and photography for James Cameron's Avatar was primarily done in New Zealand; both films are among the highest-grossing movies of all time. The New Zealand Film Commission funds films with New Zealand content.

Mainstream American, British and Australian films screen in theatres in most cities and towns. Some arthouse films and foreign language films reach cinemas, including weekly Bollywood screenings in many city cinemas. Asian films, particularly from India, China, Hong Kong and Japan, are widely available for rental on videocassette, DVD and similar media, especially in Auckland.

== Modern media ==
=== Internet ===
Internet is widely available in New Zealand. There are 1,916,000 broadband connections and just 65,000 dialup connections, with almost every home having an internet connection. Digital subscriber line over phone lines provides two-thirds of broadband, and fibre to the home now covers over a third of the main towns and cities. Parts of Wellington, Kapiti and Christchurch have cable internet access, satellite internet is widely available, most of the country is covered by 3G mobile broadband, and 4G is available in major centres. Broadband pricing is at, or above the OECD average, and most connections have a fixed data cap. There are about 80 ISPs, with two of them having three-quarters of the market. The New Zealand Government is funding two broadband expansion initiatives, with the aim of providing fibre to the home of 75% of the population and bringing broadband to 97.8% of the population by 2019. International connectivity is mainly provided by the Southern Cross Cable.

Internet portals like Google New Zealand, Yahoo New Zealand, NZCity and MSN New Zealand have been popular in New Zealand since the outset of internet access. News websites like Stuff, tvnz.co.nz, rnz.co.nz, nzherald.co.nz, and newshub.co.nz are increasingly taking over the portal role. Scoop and Voxy publish raw news coverage such as press releases, while skysport.co.nz, radiosport.co.nz and Sportal provide dedicated coverage of sports news. Online magazines such as nbr.co.nz, businessdesk.co.nz, idealog.co.nz, nzbusiness.co.nz and NZ Entrepreneur.co.nz cover business news.

Notable right-wing alternative media have included The Platform, Counterspin Media, Reality Check Radio and Centrist.

=== Blogging and social media ===
New Zealand's blogosphere is dominated by a small community of blogs that comment on New Zealand politics, society and occurrences. One list of over 200 "author-operated, public discourse" blogs in New Zealand (ranked according to traffic, links incoming, posting frequency and comments) suggests New Zealand blogs cover a wide range of ideological positions but a lack of female contributors. Some personal blogs have been around since the mid-1990s, but there are now blogs about cities, science, law and fashion magazines. Political bloggers include current and former party apparatchiks such as David Farrar (Kiwiblog), Jordan Carter, Peter Cresswell and Trevor Loudon, and journalists and commentators such as Russell Brown.

New Zealand politicians and political groups operate blogs which, unlike overseas counterparts, allow comments. Craig Foss operates a personal blog. The Green Party expands on party press releases, and Labour MPs discuss policy and Parliamentary business. Blogging is a central campaigning tool for many political lobbying groups. Political bloggers have been described as potentially the most powerful "opinion makers" in New Zealand politics. There is also an active political and non-political New Zealand community on Twitter, Facebook, Instagram, Tumblr and Flickr.

=== Video games ===
New Zealand has a growing video game industry. As of 2020, an estimated 67% of the population plays video games, and the local development sector employed 747 full-time developers, earning NZ$323.9 million in revenue, 96% of which came from international audiences. Notable studios include Grinding Gear Games, developers of Path of Exile, Ninja Kiwi, creators of the Bloons series, and PikPok, the country's largest game studio. The New Zealand Game Developers Association supports the industry, and the annual New Zealand Game Developers Conference and New Zealand Games Festival are held each year. New Zealand was an early adopter of video games, producing its own Pong-style console, the Sportronic, in the late 1970s.

== Public opinion and perceptions ==
In April 2020, the Auckland University of Technology's (AUT) research centre for Journalism, Media and Democracy (JMAD) first annual "Trust in Aotearoa News in New Zealand" report found that 53% of New Zealanders trusted "most of the news most of the time" while 62% trusted the news they personally consumed. State broadcasters Radio New Zealand (RNZ) and TVNZ (Television New Zealand) were the most trusted news brands, with ratings of 7/10 and 6.8/10 respectively. Despite strong levels of trust in the news, respondents were concerned about poor journalism, spin, commercial and political messaging presented as news, and "fake news." 86% of respondents were concerned about politicians using fake news to discredit news sources while 50% were strongly concerned with fake news. The Trust in Aotearoa News report, which was produced in collaboration with the Reuters Institute for the Study of Journalism (RISJ) and conducted by Horizon Research Ltd, surveyed 1,204 adult New Zealanders (aged over 18 years) between 23 and 30 March 2020.

In April 2021, the Trust in News in New Zealand 2021 report found that overall public trust in the news had declined from 53% in 2020 to 48% in 2021. Trust in the news that people consumed declined from 62% in 2020 to 55% in 2021. Trust in news generated by search engines fell from 27% last year to 26% in 2021. Trust in news generated by social media fell from 16% in 2020 to 14% in 2021. All media brands experienced a decline in trust, particularly commercial radio station Newstalk ZB and commercial TV news broadcaster Newshub. The top three most trusted media brands were RNZ (6.8/10), TVNZ (6.6/10) and Newshub (6.3/10). 62% of New Zealanders believed that the mainstream media was the best source of COVID-19 pandemic news, compared with 12% for social media platforms. Key reasons for media distrust included political bias, the perceived politicisation of media, agenda building on issues like climate change, opinionated coverage, selective reporting and poor journalism standards including factual mistakes and grammatical errors. The Trust in News in New Zealand 2021 report surveyed 1,226 adult New Zealanders between 4 and 9 March 2022.

In April 2022, the Trust in News in Aotearoa New Zealand 2022 report found that public trust in the news they consumed had declined from 62% in 2020 to 52%. Additionally, general trust in the news in general fell from 53% in 2020 to 45% in 2022. Between 2021 and 2022, trust in the Iwi Radio Network, Whakaata Māori (Māori Television) and TVNZ dropped by more than 10% while trust in RNZ declined by 9%. The top trusted media outlets were RNZ (6.2/10), the Otago Daily Times (6.0/10), TVNZ (5.9/10) and Newshub (5.8/10). The Trust in News in Aotearoa New Zealand 2022 report surveyed 1,085 adult New Zealanders between 22 February and 1 March 2022. Key factors fuelling the decline of media trust included Government funding for the media and a perceived pro-government bias in covering COVID-19 related news including vaccinations, vaccine mandates and protests.

In April 2023, the Trust in News in Aotearoa New Zealand 2023 report found that general trust in the news had declined from 45% in 2022 to 42% in 2023. However, trust in the news that people consumed rose from 52% to 53%. Trust in RNZ, Whakaata Māori and Newstalk ZB declined by 14.5%, 14.3% and 14% respectively. The top three trusted brands in 2023 were RNZ, Otago Daily Times and TVNZ. The study also found that 69% of respondents avoided the news since they found them depressive, negative, anxiety-inducing, repetitive, boring and over-dramatic. The 2023 Trust in News in Aotearoa New Zealand 2023 report surveyed 1,120 adult New Zealanders between 13 and 18 February 2023.

In April 2024, the Trust in News in Aotearoa New Zealand 2024 report found that general trust in the news had declined from 42% to 33% while the number of respondents avoiding the news had risen from 69% to 75%. All media brands experienced declines in trust. The top ranked brand was the Otago Daily Times, followed by RNZ and National Business Review tied for second place. TVNZ was the biggest source of news for New Zealanders, followed by Facebook despite a drop in trustworthiness. The Trust in News in Aotearoa New Zealand 2024 report surveyed 1,033 adult New Zealanders between 12 and 16 February 2024.

In April 2025, the Trust in News in Aotearoa New Zealand 2025 report found that general trust in the media had declined from 33% to 32% while 45% of New Zealanders said that they trusted the news they consumed themselves. The report also found that public trust in all news brands increased with Whakaata Māori, Iwi Radio, Radio New Zealand and The Spinoff making the strongest recovery from 2024 levels. The most trust news brand was Radio New Zealand, followed by the Otago Daily Times, and TVNZ and National Business Review in third place. The study also compared media trust in New Zealand with other international markets including the United States (32%), the United Kingdom (36%), Finland (69%) and Greece and Hungary (tied 23%). The number of people avoiding the media fell from 75% to 73%. The Trust in News in Aotearoa New Zealand 2025 report surveyed 1,058 adult New Zealanders between 10 and 14 February 2025.

In April 2026, the Trust in News in Aotearoa New Zealand 2026 report found that general trust in the media had slightly improved from 32% in 2025 to 37% in 2026. Similarly, the percentage of New Zealanders trusting in the news they consumed had risen from 45% in 2025 to 50% in 2026. The report's authors Greg Treadwell and Merja Myllylahti attributed this slight improvement in trust to greater public awareness of disinformation, deep fakes and AI slop on social media as well as the fading memory of the COVID-19 pandemic in New Zealand, which had coincided with a rise in public distrust in the media and government. 19% of respondents got their main source of news from social media. While trust in social media remained low, this figure increased from 13% in 2025 to 17% in 2026. The most trusted news brand was Radio New Zealand, followed by the Otago Daily Times in second place and TVNZ in third place. The fourth most trusted media brands were Newsroom, Interest.co.nz, New Zealand Listener and the Waikato Times. The Trust in News in Aotearoa New Zealand 2026 report surveyed 1,060 adult New Zealanders between 10 and 17 February 2026.
