= Mister Organ =

2022 New Zealand documentary film

- Directed by: David Farrier
- Produced by: David Farrier; Alex Reed; Emma Slade
- Cinematography: Dominic Fryer
- Edited by: Dan Kircher
- Production companies: Firefly Films, Bloom Pictures
- Distributed by: Madman Entertainment
- Release dates: 24 September 2022 (Fantastic Fest); 10 November 2022 (New Zealand)
- Running time: 96 minutes
- Country: New Zealand
- Language: English
- Box office: $316,380

Mister Organ is a 2022 New Zealand documentary film by David Farrier, focusing on the life of Mister Organ, an enigmatic figure associated with an antiques store and car clamping business in Ponsonby, Auckland, and Farrier's attempts to learn more about his life.

== Premise ==
The documentary investigates Mister Organ, beginning with an investigation into Bashford Antiques, an antique store in Ponsonby, Auckland which was known for its over-enthusiastic car clamping policy.

== Production ==
The film is a result of a three-year investigation. Farrier first reported on the story of Bashford Antiques in September 2016, in an article for The Spinoff. As a result of Farrier's original story, the New Zealand Government introduced legislation outlawing excessive clamping fees.

The film was announced by Farrier in his blog in June 2020, originally with the title Clamped. Farrier described the documentary's production as an ordeal, stating that, "It sucked … It fucked me. If I had my time again with this, I guarantee you I would not do it."

== Release ==
The film debuted on 12 October 2022 at Fantastic Fest, an annual film festival held in Austin, Texas. It was released to New Zealand cinemas on 10 November.

== Reception ==
The film holds a 95% score with an average rating of 7.6/10 on review aggregator Rotten Tomatoes, based on 43 critic reviews. On Metacritic, the film holds a weighted average rating of 72 out of 100, based on nine critics.

=== Legal disputes ===
As is covered in the film itself, after Bashford Antiques closed, Farrier took the store's broken and abandoned sign, which led Organ to take Farrier to the Whanganui Disputes Tribunal, in order to repossess the sign. As the sign had since been stolen from Farrier's residence, he was forced to pay NZ$3,000 in compensation to Organ.

In late October 2022, broadcaster and The Platform founder Sean Plunket shared several legal documents on Twitter relating to a temporary restraining order issued against Farrier ahead of Mister Organ's release in November. On 5 November, Farrier subsequently confirmed during a media interview with Radio New Zealand host Kim Hill that the legal documents were genuine. On 8 November, Farrier announced during an interview with Tova O'Brien on Today FM that he would be pursuing legal action against Plunket over his Tweets and the dissemination of the protection order.

On 27 April 2023, Plunket was charged with two charges of publishing a Family Court report, including identifying information about a person, without leave of a court. He pleaded not guilty to the charges and his case was remanded until May 2023. On 18 July 2023, the Police dropped their charges against Plunket on the grounds that they would have difficulty proving that the charges met the Family Court Act's definition of publishing the details of a "vulnerable person." The Police found that Plunket had only shared redacted documents which were subsequently unredacted by other people on social media.
