= Suidlanders =

South African Afrikaner supremacist group

- Formation: 2006; 20 years ago
- Founder: Gustav Zietsman Müller
- Type: Civil defence organization; Conservative ethnonationalist white Afrikaner survivalist group
- Purpose: Emergency evacuation of white citizens in a state of nationwide anarchy
- Members: 130,000 claimed (2018)
- Leader: Gustav Müller
- Spokesperson: Simon Roche
- Website: Afrikaans: suidlanders.co.za English: suidlanders.org

The Suidlanders (English: Southlanders) is a South African right-wing ethnonationalist Afrikaner survivalist group whose ideology is based on the prophecies of Boer Siener van Rensburg. The group believes that a race war or general civil war, sometimes referred to as "Uhuru" or the "Night of the Long Knives", is coming in South Africa. They anticipate an eventual collapse of infrastructure, and advocate and plan for an evacuation of white South Africans from major cities in the event of a race war. The group has claimed success in raising global awareness of the claimed threat, following a 2017 tour to the United States by spokesperson Simon Roche, and has also taken credit for an offer by Australian government minister Peter Dutton to preferentially grant refugee visas to white South African farmers.

== History and beliefs ==
The Suidlanders were formed in 2006 by Gustav Müller, who still heads the organisation. Müller is quoted in a video recording of 28 May 2016 as saying "My actual calling (vocation) is to bring the Boer people back to God."

The Suidlanders' activity increased after the murder of Eugène Terre'Blanche, an Afrikaner nationalist. Although the murder did not trigger massive social unrest, it did spread concern among far-right organisations and some conservative groups in South Africa.

The Suidlanders currently claim to be a civil organisation that is close to illegal in their own country. The group explicitly distances itself from neo-Nazi organisations, though they take credit for propagating the white genocide conspiracy theory.

The Suidlanders say that they are loosely inspired by the prophecies of Siener van Rensburg, a peasant farmer who served as a spiritual adviser to several Boer military leaders during the Second Boer War. They believe van Rensburg predicted a massive civil insurrection that would lead to an alleged race war in South Africa. The group believes that a state of anarchy is coming to South Africa as a result of the revolutionary speeches by Marxist African leaders calling for action against the minority in the country supported by policies to be implemented against the minority under the banner of redress.

In the wake of Nelson Mandela's death, the Suidlanders estimated the "revolution risk" in South Africa as 50 per cent, and said it would be a great time to "go on holiday", a coded statement involving the prophesied "Uhuru" or "Night of Long Knives", when blacks would allegedly kill whites in South Africa.

== Leadership and management ==
The Suidlanders is led by an executive council composed of Louis de la Gey, Bertus Schwan and Ben van Rensburg. Their public face is Simon Roche.

They have received donations from a variety of far-right and white Nationalists: the neo-confederate League of the South, Identity Evropa founder Nathan Damigo, and American Vanguard. They also received $40,000 on FreeStartr, the defunct alt-right Patreon alternative. The Suidlanders conduct training in all aspects of civil defence throughout the year. The training includes logistics and operations, control of refugees, first aid, firearms training, and communication.

== White genocide ==
The Suidlanders took credit for drawing attention to the severity of racially-based hate crimes that affect White South Africans. They believe anti-white racist war to be imminent. They also claim credit for increasing coverage of the issue by figures such as Katie Hopkins, and for an offer by Australian former cabinet minister Peter Dutton to resettle white South Africans as refugees.

== Popular culture ==
A group of Suidlanders featured in episode 7 of David Farrier's Dark Tourist.

Suidlanders are repeatedly called out as among the antagonists in the film G20.

== See also ==
- South African farm attacks
- AfriForum
