= Sean Plunket =

New Zealand journalist

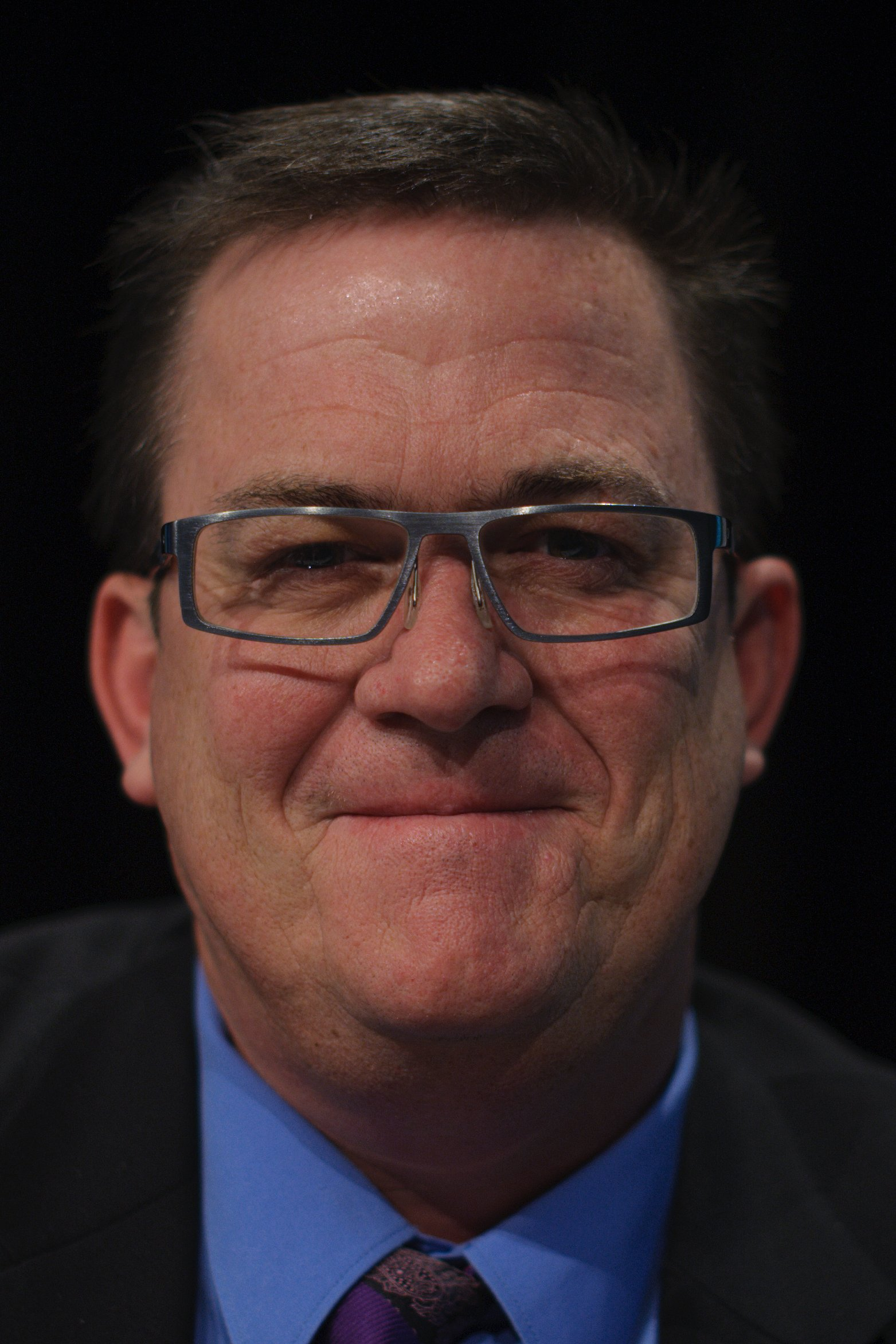
- Sean Plunket at Net Hui 2011
- Born: Oliver Sean Plunket; 9 September 1964 (age 62); Christchurch, New Zealand
- Occupation: Digital journalist

Oliver Sean Plunket (known professionally as Sean Plunket) is a New Zealand journalist. Plunket has worked for several New Zealand broadcast media companies and stations including Radio Windy, Independent Radio News, Radio New Zealand, TV3, TVNZ, Newstalk ZB, and MagicTalk. Plunket also served as the communications director of The Opportunities Party during the 2017 New Zealand general election. In late 2021, Plunket founded an online media site The Platform.

== Early life ==
Plunket was born in Christchurch, the son of journalist Patrick Plunket. He was educated at Plimmerton Primary School and Nelson College from 1980 to 1982, where he was a member of the 1st XV rugby union team in 1981 and 1982. He went on to study at the Wellington Polytechnic School of Journalism.

== Broadcasting career ==
=== Mainstream media ===
Plunket's early positions in broadcasting and journalism included a brief stint as a copywriter at Radio Windy, five years at Independent Radio News, a short spell as a reporter for Radio New Zealand, three years as a political reporter on TV3, working as a presenter–reporter on TVNZ's Fair Go and Under Investigation programmes, and then further roles at TV3 on 20/20 and as senior political reporter.

From 1997 to 2010, he was one of two breakfast hosts of Morning Report between 6 am and 9 am weekdays on Radio New Zealand National. His regular co-host was Geoff Robinson. In 2009, Plunket lost a dispute with his employer, Radio New Zealand, who he took to the Employment Relations Authority. Plunket announced his resignation from Radio New Zealand in June 2010 and his last day on Morning Report was 8 September 2010.

From January 2011 to December 2012 he presented Sean Plunket Mornings on the Wellington branch of Newstalk ZB.

Plunket took over hosting the 9 am–noon weekday slot on Radio Live, later known as MagicTalk, from Michael Laws in April 2013, continuing to December 2015, when he was replaced by Mark Sainsbury. Until 2014, he wrote a weekly column for The Dominion Post.

In January 2015, Plunket made remarks on Radio Live describing New Zealand writer Eleanor Catton as an "ungrateful hua" (an insult derived from a Mãori language word) and a "traitor" for her remarks criticising the National Government's alleged disinterest in the arts and culture, and New Zealand's "tall poppy syndrome." Plunket drew criticism for his remarks from Victoria University Press publisher Fergus Barrowman, TV3 journalist David Farrier, and arts commentator Hamish Keith, who defended Catton's right to freedom of expression and advocacy. The media watchdog Broadcasting Standards Authority (BSA) received two complaints about Plunket's remarks but rejected them.

In late September 2017, the Broadcasting Standards Authority appointed Plunket to a three-year term as a member of the media watchdog, commencing 1 October 2017. Later that year, he resigned from the BSA after posting a Twitter post "asking if anyone felt sorry for disgraced film producer Harvey Weinstein."

Soon after the dismissal of former interim MagicTalk talkback radio host John Banks, Plunket left the station in February 2021. Plunket's own talkback radio slot had already been the subject of a successful BSA complaint over remarks that a Māori iwi (tribe) "did not care about child abuse" while discussing an iwi roadblock intended to protect its elderly members from the COVID-19 pandemic. However, Mediaworks has stressed that Plunket was not pushed to leave as a result.

=== The Platform, 2021–present ===
In September 2021, Plunket announced plans to start his own online talkback station called The Platform, which he said would promote free speech, democracy and debate. According to Plunket, the station does not receive funding from public sources such as the Public Interest Journalism Fund due to its requirement for recipients to adhere to the principles of the Treaty of Waitangi, which he regarded as a limitation on free speech. Besides Plunket, other notable hosts have included sports broadcaster Martin Devlin and Otago Regional Council member Michael Laws had joined the talkback station. Notable guests have included politicians such as David Seymour, Winston Peters, Chris Hipkins, and Michael Bassett.

Between 16 and 17 February 2023, the Employment Relations Authority (ERA) heard an employment dispute between Plunket and former Platform digital engagement editor Ani O'Brien, who had previously served as National Party leader Judith Collins' press secretary. O'Brien testified that Plunket had acted aggressively on three occasions between May and June 2022, causing her mental health to deteriorate. While Plunket denied that he had an aggressive demeanour at work, he acknowledged that he had acted "appallingly" in times of "high stress." Plunket also admitted that he lacked experience in managing multiple staff but had since received business and management guidance from company director Wayne Wright. Plunket disputed O'Brien's claims that he had created an unsafe work environment and accused her of undermining his leadership. During the hearing, Collins' former chief press secretary John Mitchell alleged that O'Brien had undermined Collins' leadership and had significant "trust issues". On 10 February 2025, the Employment Relations Authority ruled in O'Brien's favour, awarding her compensation for humiliation, loss of dignity and injury to feelings in relation to her employment case against The Platform.

As a host on The Platform, Plunket covered controversial anti-transgender activist Kellie-Jay Keen-Minshull's ("Posie Parker") Auckland speaking event on 25 March 2023, which was disrupted by counter-protesters. He denounced the counter-protest as "mob rule" and described the cancellation of Keen's tour as "a victory for cancel culture and bullies in the trans and gay communities." Plunket said he would give priority to white female talkback callers alleging that they had not been protected during the protest.

On 3 April 2023, Plunket attracted media attention after asking Prime Minister Chris Hipkins during a press conference to define what was a woman. This was part of a recent international trend of politicians including British Labour Party leader Keir Starmer and former Scottish First Minister Nicola Sturgeon being asked in media interviews to define womanhood.

A week later, on 10 April 2023, Plunket claimed on The Platform that ex-Prime Minister Jacinda Ardern had been hiding her new speaking engagement from the public. Plunket later tweeted: “nice work if you can get it” with a screenshot of a fake Ardern speaking circuit listing. A clip of Plunket's segment from The Platform's morning show was later shared to Twitter with the caption “Sean Plunket exposes the new job of Jacinda Ardern”. Subsequently, Plunket removed references to the fake Ardern ad from his and The Platform’s social media and encouraged his followers to delete any mentions of it as well.

In September 2023, Plunket stated that there were rumours that the media company Stuff had received financial support from the Māori iwi (tribe) Ngāi Tahu, which he claimed that Stuff had "gone all woke and critical race theory." Plunket's claims were denied by Stuff's owner Sinead Boucher, who stated that the company did not have a financial relationship with Ngāi Tahu.

In September 2025, Plunket gained full ownership of The Platform after Wayne Wright Jr. sold his majority stake in the company to Plunket for a confidential sum. While the Wright family had previously funded The Platform during its launch in September 2021, the online radio station had become reliant on membership subscriptions, advertising revenue, donations and merchandise sales by July 2025.

== Social media activities ==
=== Withdrawn charges of publication of court proceedings ===
In late October 2022, Plunket shared several screenshots on Twitter of a protection order filed against the investigative journalist and filmmaker David Farrier. The dissemination of these Tweets preceded the scheduled release of Farrier's Mister Organ documentary film on 10 November. The film looked at the controversial car-clamping practices of former Auckland businessman Michael Organ. On 5 November, Farrier confirmed the authenticity of the protection order. On 8 November, Farrier announced he would be pursuing legal action against Plunket disseminating the protection order on Twitter. On 22 December 2022, all charges against Farrier were dismissed by the New Zealand family court, which noted "significant embellishment in the initial affidavit" and "[t]here was not full and frank disclosure on this occasion."

On 27 April 2023, Plunket appeared in the Wellington District Court on charges of publishing a report of court proceedings without leave. He pleaded not guilty to two charges of publishing a Family Court report, including identifying information about a person, without leave of a court. His case was remanded until May 2023. These charges carry a maximum penalty of three months imprisonment or a NZ$2,000 fine. On 23 June, NZME reported that the Police had applied to the District Court to withdraw all charges against Plunket for publishing Family Court documents. Farrier had claimed that Plunket had not only revealed Farrier's identity but the names of other people connected with the Family Court proceedings. The Police countered that Plunket had only shared redacted documents which were subsequently unredacted by other people on social media. On 18 July, the charges against Plunket were dropped on the grounds that Police would have difficulty proving that the charges met the Family Court Act's definition of publishing details of a vulnerable person.

=== Twitter suspension ===
On 3 April 2023, Plunket was suspended from Twitter for breaching privacy rules as well as the "hateful conduct" rule. In response, Plunket attributed his ban to mass reporting by opponents of anti-transgender activist Keen-Minshull. In addition, human rights advocate Guled Mired confirmed that he had reported Plunket's Tweet encouraging people to read the Christchurch mosque shooter's manifesto, which is banned under New Zealand law, as "hateful content." On 6 April, Plunket successfully appealed against his Twitter ban. He credited Twitter owner Elon Musk, British broadcaster Piers Morgan, Canadian academic Jordan Peterson, Keen-Minshull, and Australian columnist Rita Panahi with reinstating his account.
