= NZ On Air =

Broadcasting and media funding agency of the New Zealand Government

- Irirangi te Motu (Māori)
- Logo used since 2021

Commission overview
- Formed: 1989
- Jurisdiction: New Zealand Government
- Headquarters: Wellington, New Zealand
- Motto: "Our stories, our voices" "Ā tātou kōrero, ō tātou reo"
- Commission executive: Cameron Harland, Chief Executive
- Parent department: Ministry for Culture and Heritage
- Key document: Broadcasting Act 1989
- Website: nzonair.govt.nz

NZ On Air (NZOA; Māori: Irirangi te Motu), formally the Broadcasting Commission, is an autonomous Crown entity and commission of the New Zealand Government responsible for providing funding for broadcasting and creative works. The commission operates largely separate from government policy but must follow directions from the Minister of Broadcasting. NZOA is responsible for the funding of public broadcasting content across television, radio and other media platforms. It is also a major investor in New Zealand independent producers.

NZ On Air is the operating name of the Broadcasting Commission formed in the Broadcasting Act 1989 alongside the Broadcasting Standards Authority, meant to encourage individuals to pay the Broadcasting Fee then used to fund public broadcasters. In 1999 the Broadcasting Fee was abolished, and NZOA now receives funding directly from the Ministry for Culture and Heritage.

== History ==
In 2025, it launched the KIDOGO YouTube channel carrying NZOA-funded programmes aimed at children. It was created following the results of its third Where Are The Audiences joint survey with Te Māngai Pāho.

== Activities ==
NZ On Air's activities can be broken up into several areas:

=== Public broadcasting ===
NZOA funds New Zealand-focused radio, television, New Zealand music and digital media production for a range of public and private broadcasters and platforms. This includes drama, documentary, children's programmes and programmes for special interest groups.

Programmes funded by NZOA often have an announcement about the commission's support for the programme. Initially the announcement was: "This programme was made with the help of your Broadcasting Fee – so you can see more of New Zealand on Air". After the abolition of the Broadcasting Fee, the announcement often said: "This programme was made with funding from New Zealand On Air". More commonly, at the end of a broadcast, a programme will say: "Thank you, New Zealand On Air, for helping us make (name of the show)."

The agency funds Radio New Zealand, and the independently owned Access Radio Network, Student Radio Network and Pacific Media Network.

=== Cultural promotion ===
NZ On Air focuses on "local content" – New Zealand programmes that are expensive or risky to make which the broadcaster market cannot fully pay for. These programmes are primarily drama, documentary, children's programmes and special-interest programmes.

=== Archiving ===
Funding for audiovisual archiving is now administered directly by the Ministry for Culture and Heritage. Centralising such archiving funding was a key recommendation of the seminal Horrocks review led by NZ On Air and published in 2009. In 2008 NZOA funded the establishment of NZ On Screen to enable easy online access for past New Zealand screen production. NZOA has since funded a similar NZ music history site AudioCulture, which launched in 2013.

=== Promotion of New Zealand music ===
Aimed at increasing the diversity of New Zealand music on diverse platforms including radio.

== Broadcasting fee ==
NZOA was established under the Broadcasting Act 1989, initially funded by an annual NZ$110 licence fee known as the Public Broadcasting Fee, paid by each household with a television set.

A strong campaign developed in the late 1990s from a section of the public against the Broadcasting Fee. The reason behind the campaign was to prove "whether the broadcasting fee is a tax and the legality of applying GST to this tax". In the end the fee was scrapped effective 1 July 2000, and the commission has since been directly funded by the government. The fee was collected from those people who owned a television set although the fee was funding much more than television work, especially radio. Some campaigners believed this was unfair.

== Music production ==
NZ on Air produces and distributes the Kiwi Hit Disc to showcase new funded music. NZOA provides "Making Tracks" funding for recording songs and their associated music videos. Funded music is chosen by a monthly, rotating panel of broadcast and music professionals.

== Controversies and criticism ==
NZ on Air has attracted criticism over claims of misuse of its funds. In mid-2010 it spent $75,000 on two events celebrate 21 years of activity and between 2006 and 2011 it gave $80,000 in funding to help produce recordings and music videos for Annabel Fay, daughter of one of New Zealand's richest men, Sir Michael Fay. The Fay controversy contributed to the scrapping of the NZ on Air Album funding scheme in December 2010. NZ on Air was also criticised in 2012 for helping fund the production of The GC, a TV3 documentary series about young Māori New Zealanders living on Australia's Gold Coast and for granting $30,000 to assist recording by Titanium, the winner of a radio competition to create a boy band.

In early 2012, Labour MPs accused NZ on Air of a potential conflict of interest when NZ on Air board member and Prime Minister John Key's electorate chairman Stephen McElrea questioned the timing of the NZ on Air-funded documentary Inside Child Poverty, broadcast four days before the 2011 New Zealand general election. Two days after the broadcast, NZ on Air CEO Jane Wrightson had written to broadcaster TV3, expressing her disappointment with the show being broadcast days before the election. Complaints were laid with the Electoral Commission, which found the documentary did not come under its jurisdiction so it could not rule. The Broadcasting Standards Authority also received a complaint, but found the documentary did not break its rules on fairness, and law and order.

=== Being Chloe Controversy ===
In mid-2022, NZ on Air was labelled "tone-deaf" by opposition MPs after it was revealed that NZ on Air had granted $200,000 to fund a documentary about a sitting coalition MP, who was seeking re-election in 2023. Being Chlöe is the third documentary profiling Green MP Chlöe Swarbrick to get funded by NZ On Air since her election in 2017. NZ On Air refused to answer 1News' questions on the issue, saying it was too busy.

In response to the controversy, Broadcasting Minister Kris Faafoi said NZ On Air is independent and answerable for its funding decisions. Three days later, NZ on Air released a statement saying "NZ On Air runs a contestable funding process, to which any producer, with the support of an eligible platform, can submit a funding application on any subject", and that neither Swarbrick nor the Green Party will have any editorial control, or financial benefit.

== See also ==
- Television in New Zealand
- Radio in New Zealand
