= Martin Devlin =

New Zealand broadcaster

- Born: 1964 (age 61–62); New Zealand
- Citizenship: New Zealander
- Education: St. Patrick's College
- Occupation: Sports broadcaster
- Employer: MediaWorks

Martin Devlin (born 1964) is a New Zealand radio and television broadcaster. In July 2012, The Radio Network announced that Devlin would take over the morning show for NZ's first private station, Radio Hauraki. Devlin later anchored a show on Newstalk ZB, until 2021. Devlin is currently host of the DSPN - Devlin Sports Podcast Network.

== Biography ==
Devlin is the nephew of New Zealand rock-and-roll star Johnny Devlin, and was educated at St. Patrick's College, Silverstream and at St Augustines College, Wanganui.

Devlin began his broadcasting career in radio in 1987, and is the recipient of numerous broadcasting awards, including 'sports broadcaster of the year' six times. Devlin has worked on a variety of shows: Energy FM in New Plymouth, Channel Z in Wellington, as well as networks – The Edge, Radio Sport and Radio Live. Devlin writes sport for NZ Rugby World, and does a sport talkback blog for tvnz.co.nz as well as being a regular weekly contributor for Rugby Centre on Sky TV's Rugby Channel.

Devlin anchored TVNZ's coverage of both the 2010 FIFA World Cup and 2014 Fifa World Cup. In January 2011, Martin Devlin identified himself as the person involved in a minor 'disorderly behaviour' charge in December 2010.

Devlin anchored the 2011 Rugby World Cup. On the opening night of the Rugby World Cup, over one million viewers tuned in to watch Devlin interview Jonah Lomu in the minutes before the opening match that featured the All Blacks vs Tonga.

Devlin was briefly taken off air in May 2021 after allegations that he attempted to physically assault a colleague in the NZME newsroom. It was also alleged that he had sent inappropriate messages to other colleagues. Devlin apologised and said he struggled with mental health issues. In July 2021, Devlin was reinstated to his role after two complaints were found to not be substantiated. In July 2021, it was reported that Devlin had unsuccessfully attempted suicide.

In November 2021, Devlin announced that he had resigned from NZME.

By 2022, Devlin had become a host on The Platform, an internet radio station founded by veteran broadcaster Sean Plunket. In October 2024, Devlin left The Platform.

In 2024 Devlin launched DSPN - Devlin Sports Podcast Network, which is hosted by rova (part of MediaWorks New Zealand)

== See also ==
- List of New Zealand television personalities
