= David Farrier =

New Zealand writer, actor, and filmmaker (born 1982)

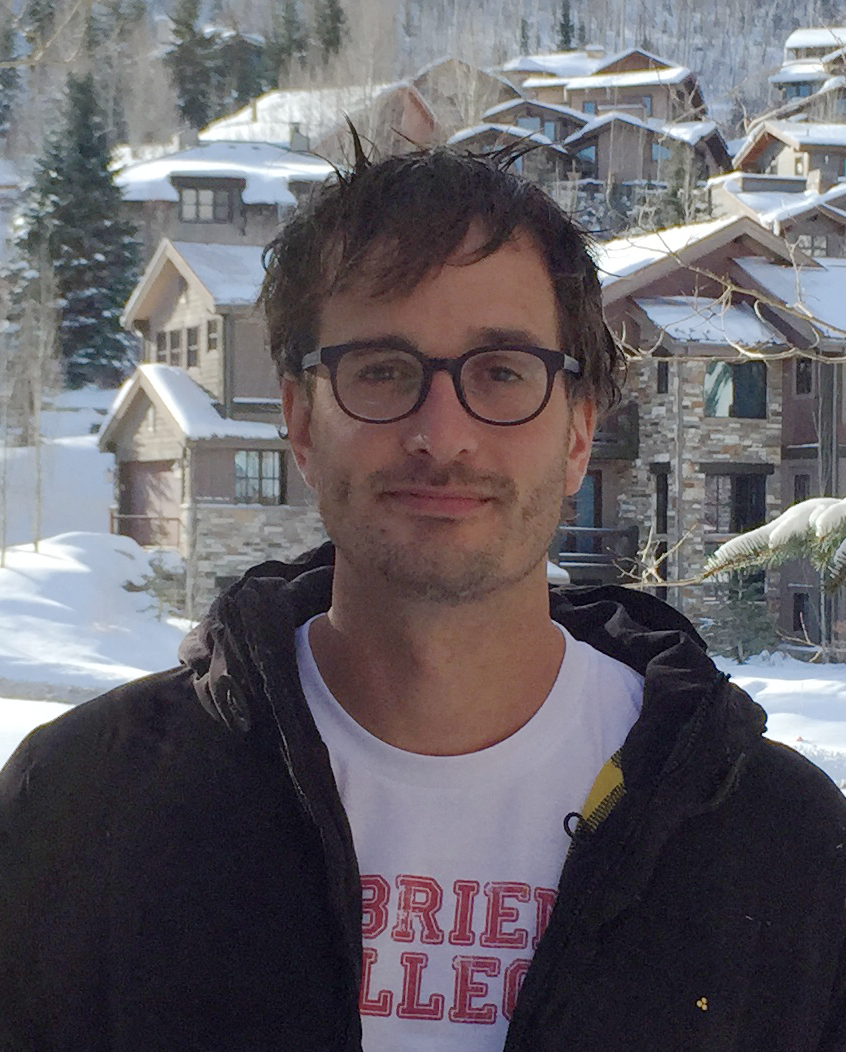
- Farrier in 2016
- Born: 25 December 1982 (age 43); Tauranga, New Zealand
- Education: Auckland University of Technology
- Occupations: Journalist; actor; filmmaker
- Notable credit(s): Dark Tourist; Tickled; Newsworthy; Nightline; 3 News; Short Poppies

David Andrew Farrier (born 25 December 1982) is a New Zealand writer, actor, and filmmaker. He appeared in the 2014 Rhys Darby mockumentary series Short Poppies. He has worked in news and on documentaries, including features on New Zealand television and co-directing the documentary film Tickled (2016). He created the 2018 Netflix documentary series Dark Tourist, in which he visits popular dark tourism attractions.

== Early life ==
David Andrew Farrier was born in Tauranga on 25 December 1982. One of his grandmothers was English. He grew up in Tauranga's Bethlehem suburb, where he was home-schooled before attending the Christian Bethlehem College. He was raised by devout Baptists and has described his younger self as "a really good Christian". He initially enrolled at university to study medicine but soon lost interest and instead entered the Auckland University of Technology, where he graduated with a Bachelor of Communication Studies in 2005.

== Career ==
=== Documentaries and writing ===
Farrier started his journalism career at 3 News, and he was Nightline's entertainment reporter from 2006 until the program's end in 2013. In 2011, he made a 45-minute documentary for TV3 about the origins of "God Defend New Zealand", one of the two New Zealand national anthems. In 2014, he played a fictionalised version of himself in Darby's 2014 mockumentary series Short Poppies.

In 2014, Farrier began production of the feature-length documentary Tickled, in collaboration with Dylan Reeve. The film centres on "competitive endurance tickling" and videos featuring it, as well as those producing the videos. It explores the legal and ethical issues of making the videos and has itself been the subject of legal challenges. The film premiered in January 2016 at the Sundance Film Festival and was shown on HBO. In 2017, Farrier did a short follow-up documentary, with previously unseen footage, entitled The Tickle King.

In 2015, Farrier became co-host, with reporter Sam Hayes, of the TV3 show Newsworthy, which aired for one year. In a June 2015 episode, Farrier interviewed the then-leader of the New Conservative Party, Colin Craig, in a sauna. Craig resigned as party leader the same month that the conversation aired, with some in the media saying the interview was one of the contributing factors to his leadership failing. This interview was also played during the 2017 defamation trial between Craig and blogger Cameron Slater. In 2022, Farrier expressed regret for the interview in light of Craig's political views and said, "It drew parallels to "what Jimmy Fallon did to Donald Trump. Fallon, ruffling Trump's hair. Me, topless, joking around with Colin. It was an image that instantly excused all that bad shit."

In November 2016, Farrier wrote an article for The Spinoff about individuals with various sexual fetishes issuing "challenges" or dares to children on YouTube, encouraging them to make seemingly innocent videos of themselves; this led to several YouTube accounts being banned. Farrier is a frequent guest contributor to The Spinoff, covering topics such as conspiracy theories, COVID-19, media, and culture.

In 2018, Farrier was an executive producer and served as presenter on the Netflix documentary series Dark Tourist, in which he travels to various locations around the world associated with death and tragedy.

In 2020, Farrier began publishing the newsletter Webworm, which covers a range of topics and in its early years had a specific focus on conspiracy theories, such as QAnon. It has since broadened its topics of coverage: for example, in 2022, Farrier broke a story about allegations of employment and sexual abuse at Arise Church. He has also covered stories on the toymaker Zuru's defamation lawsuit of former employees.

==== Mister Organ ====
In 2016, Farrier investigated the controversial car clamping policies of Michael Organ, who enforced parking restrictions for the owner of the Bashford Antiques shop in Auckland's Ponsonby suburb and whose practices had created friction with local residents. He wrote a story about it, which was published by The Spinoff. Farrier subsequently produced a documentary called Mister Organ, which was released on 10 November 2022. Organ eventually sold Bashford Antiques and relocated to Whanganui. Once the store was closed, Farrier took the broken and abandoned sign. Organ subsequently took Farrier to the Whanganui Disputes Tribunal in order to reclaim it. Since the sign had gone missing, Farrier was forced to pay NZ$3,000 in restitution to Organ.

In late October 2022, broadcaster and Platform founder, Sean Plunket, shared screenshots on Twitter of a temporary protection order issued against Farrier ahead of Mister Organ's scheduled released in November 2022. On 5 November, Farrier confirmed during a media interview with Radio New Zealand host Kim Hill that the protection order was genuine. On 8 November, Farrier announced during an interview with Tova O'Brien on Today FM that he would be pursuing legal action against Plunket for disseminating the protection order and denied committing violence against Organ's family. On 22 December 2022, all charges were dismissed by the New Zealand family court.

=== Podcasts ===
From 2013 to 2017, Farrier co-hosted the cryptozoology-focused audio program The Cryptid Factor with comedian Rhys Darby and producers Dan Schreiber and Leon 'Buttons' Kirkbeck.

In September 2020, he appeared on the podcast Armchair Expert with Dax Shepard and thereafter has worked alongside the Armchair umbrella in releasing a podcast series dubbed Armchaired and Dangerous, which discusses popular conspiracy theories.

In May 2022, Farrier launched Flightless Bird, a new podcast for Armchair based upon his observations of American culture after being unable to return to New Zealand during the COVID-19 pandemic.

In 2022, he presented an eight-part podcast for Audible, titled When a Good Man Kills, which covers the story of how boxer Tim "Doc" Anderson murdered his manager, Rick "Elvis" Parker.

== Personal life ==
In 2012, Farrier came out as bisexual while discussing the upcoming New Zealand Marriage Amendment Act. He was in a relationship with Grayson Coutts, son of yachtsman Russell Coutts, but they have since separated.

== Filmography ==
Year	Title	Director	Producer	Presenter/host	Actor	Notes	Ref(s)
2007–13	Nightline			Yes		Television news program – entertainment presenter	
2010	Campbell Live			Yes		Current affairs television program – presenter	
2011	God Defend New Zealand			Yes		Documentary film – host	
2011	Coming & Going				Yes	Film – Angry Dinner Guest in Wheelchair	
2012	3 News			Yes		Television news program – presenter	
2014	Short Poppies				Yes	Mockumentary television series – Presenter	
2014	Manila: No Limitations				Yes	Documentary film – Himself	
2015	Ghost Shark 2: Urban Jaws				Yes	Feature film – Himself	
2015	Newsworthy			Yes		Television news program – presenter	
2016	Tickled	Yes		Yes		Documentary film	
2016	Chelsea				Yes	Television talk show – "Brexit's Aftermath & Competitive Tickling"; Himself	
2017	The Tickle King	Yes		Yes		Documentary short	
2017	The Video Store				Yes	Miniseries – David (Customer)	
2018	Dark Tourist	Yes	Yes	Yes		Documentary television series	
2020	The Project				Yes	Current affairs television series – 1 episode Himself	
2020	The George Lucas Talk Show				Yes	Improvised talk show – "Season III: Revenge of the Arli$$ith"; Himself	
2022	Mister Organ	Yes	Yes	Yes		Documentary film	
2025	Mockbuster	No	Yes	No		Documentary film; executive producer	
