= Tickled =

2016 New Zealand documentary film

- New Zealand theatrical release poster
- Directed by: David Farrier; Dylan Reeve
- Produced by: Carthew Neal
- Narrated by: David Farrier
- Cinematography: Dominic Fryer
- Edited by: Simon Coldrick
- Production companies: A Ticklish Tale; Fumes Production; Horseshoe Films
- Distributed by: Magnolia Pictures (US)
- Release date: 27 May 2016
- Running time: 92 minutes
- Country: New Zealand
- Language: English
- Box office: $923,000

Tickled is a 2016 New Zealand documentary about "competitive endurance tickling" and videos featuring it, and the practices of those producing the videos. It is directed by David Farrier and Dylan Reeve.

The film explores possible legal and ethical issues with certain individuals making the videos, and has itself been the subject of legal challenges. A follow-up special, The Tickle King, aired on HBO in February 2017.

== Synopsis ==
David Farrier, a New Zealand television reporter whose beat focuses on "quirky and odd stories", encounters online videos depicting "competitive endurance tickling", an activity in which young athletic men are restrained and tickled by each other. He begins to research it for a story and requests an interview with the videos' producer, Jane O'Brien Media. The company responds with a volatile email, refusing to "associate with a homosexual journalist", although Farrier is actually bisexual. Farrier, bewildered at the disproportionately hostile response, partners with television producer Dylan Reeve to dig deeper into the mysterious producers.

After their initial blog posts about the story go viral, Farrier and Reeve receive legal threats from Jane O'Brien Media, who send Kevin Clarke and two other representatives to New Zealand to meet with them. Although their interactions are superficially cordial, the Jane O'Brien Media representatives try to bully the investigators to drop the project. Farrier and Reeve respond by following the representatives to Los Angeles to an apparent video recording location, but are turned away at the door.

Researching the phenomenon further, Farrier and Reeve uncover information about a person known as "Terri DiSisto" (alias "Terri Tickle"), who pioneered recruiting and distributing tickling videos online in the 1990s. They interview independent tickling-video producer Richard Ivey, whose operations are comparatively low-key, and also acknowledge a homoerotic aspect. Former participants in Jane O'Brien Media's videos describe coercive and manipulative treatment by the producers, such as defamation campaigns against them, exposing their personal information, and contacting associates to discredit them as homosexual or as sexual deviants, all in retaliation for speaking out against the company. A local recruiter in Muskegon, Michigan, describes "audition" videos he helped make that were published by O'Brien Media without the participants' consent.

Farrier and Reeve discover documents on a defunct tickling video web site that link Jane O'Brien Media to David D'Amato, the former school administrator behind the "Terri Tickle" alias. From two journalists who had investigated Terri DiSisto years earlier, they learn that D'Amato served a six-month prison sentence for disabling computer systems at two different universities in retaliation against an 18-year-old male student who attempted to terminate an online relationship, which began when the young man was 17. They determine that D'Amato now lives on a substantial inheritance from his father, a successful lawyer. After considerable effort to locate D'Amato, they confront him on the street, and he responds with additional legal threats. Before returning to New Zealand, Farrier contacts D'Amato's stepmother for comment. She implicitly confirms her stepson's "tickling" past, and Farrier informs her that he believes D'Amato is still involved in it. The last thing she says is that she is "afraid" of D'Amato.

== Production ==
Under the working title Tickle King: The Hunt for the Truth in Competitive Tickling, Farrier and Reeve raised NZ$29,570 for the film on Kickstarter in June 2014, intended primarily to cover the costs of the crew traveling to the United States for a week. The project also received funding from the New Zealand Film Commission.

In addition to original music composed by Rodi Kirkcaldy and Florian Zwietnig, the film's soundtrack includes several tracks composed by Shane Carruth for his 2013 film Upstream Color.

== Release ==
The film was screened in January 2016 at the Sundance Film Festival, after which Magnolia Pictures picked up its distribution rights and HBO picked up its U.S. TV rights. In March 2016, it was presented as part of the True/False Film Festival.

On 27 May 2016, the film was released theatrically in New Zealand. It was released by Magnolia Pictures in the U.S. on 17 June, and in Australia and the United Kingdom on 19 August.

== Reception ==
Tickled received critical acclaim. On the review aggregator website Rotten Tomatoes, 94% of 120 critics' reviews of the film are positive, with an average rating of 7.6/10; the site's "critics consensus" reads: "Tickled uses an investigation into a silly-seeming subculture as the launching point for thought-provoking insights into online bullying and the destructive abilities of the internet." On Metacritic, the film has a score of 76 out of 100 based on reviews from 28 critics, indicating "generally favorable reviews".

In a review headlined "fetish documentary goes from giggly to grim", Nigel Smith of The Guardian gave the film four stars out of five. Manohla Dargis of The New York Times named it a Critic's Pick, writing that "Farrier and Mr. Reeve see the humor, but they also see the pathos—because it's all fun and giggles until someone gets hurt." Darian Lusk of the New York Observer wrote: "The shocking truth is uncomfortably pursued to its fullest, and the result is a riveting piece of investigative journalism." The Salt Lake Tribune gave the film 4.5 stars and called it "an act of journalistic courage", commenting that the filmmakers "reveal the harm that can be done by an individual with a lot of money and a vindictive streak". Dennis Harvey of Variety stated that the onscreen presence of the filmmakers "is justified because the harassment they experience in pursuing the story becomes a big part of its narrative".

Armond White of Out magazine was critical of the film, commenting that it "zips past its sexual aspects", and concluding that it is ultimately "frustrating, a blue-balls documentary".

== Aftermath ==
Following the film's premiere screening at Sundance, in March 2016, D'Amato filed a federal lawsuit against the filmmakers for making false accusations, including the implication that D'Amato used extortion and abused minors, and stated that he had no relationship with O'Brien Media. In response, Farrier told The Salt Lake Tribune that, "given the number of hollow legal threats we faced during the making of it, it's almost refreshing to see a real case being filed by real lawyers."

In April 2016, Kevin Clarke of O'Brien Media created a website to counter the claims made in the film.

D'Amato attended the screening of the film at the Nuart Theater in Los Angeles on 18 June 2016, and confronted Dylan Reeve, saying, "You need to lawyer up. You need to get criminal counsel." Clarke argued with Reeve during a public question-and-answer session after the film, saying, "The film is a piece of garbage full of lies. Release the audio tapes that show you're lying. And if you don't release it, it's the same as admitting you're lying."

Additionally, D'Amato filed a $40 million defamation and slander lawsuit in Nassau County court against his stepmother Dorothy D'Amato, alleging that she made statements in the film with the intention to injure his business, causing mental distress.

Most of the relevant events following the release of the documentary were covered in "The Tickle King", a 21-minute follow-up special which premiered on HBO in February 2017.

D'Amato died of a heart attack on 31 March 2017 at age 55. The filmmakers posted a statement on their website in which they said they were "incredibly sad" to learn of his passing, and asked that his death be treated with respect.
