= Dark Tourist (TV series) =

New Zealand documentary television series

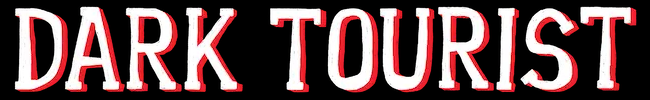
- Genre: Documentaries; Travel
- Written by: David Farrier, Paul Horan
- Country of origin: New Zealand
- Original language: English
- No. of seasons: 1
- No. of episodes: 8

Production
- Executive producers: Carthew Neal, Mark McNeil, David Farrier
- Producer: Polly Fryer
- Running time: 39–42 minutes
- Production companies: Razor Films; Fumes

Original release
- Network: Netflix
- Release: 20 July 2018

Dark Tourist is a New Zealand documentary series about the phenomenon of dark tourism, presented by journalist David Farrier. The series, which was released by Netflix in 2018, has eight episodes.

Due to the COVID-19 pandemic, a second season was not made.

== Episodes ==
No.	Title	Original release date
1	"Latin America"	20 July 2018
David travels to Medellín, where he investigates the legacy of Pablo Escobar. He later tours La Catedral with Escobar's former hit man Popeye. He then journeys to Mexico City, where he meets followers of Santa Muerte and witnesses an exorcism before experiencing a mock illegal border crossing into the US.
2	"Japan"	20 July 2018
David undertakes a tense trip to Tomioka, which was evacuated during the Fukushima nuclear disaster, wherein he discovers higher than expected levels of radiation. He then stops off at a hotel staffed solely by robots at the Huis Ten Bosch theme park before arriving at Aokigahara, a suicide hot spot. David's time in Japan is brought to a close on abandoned Hashima Island.
3	"United States"	20 July 2018
David joins fellow dark tourist Natalie in Milwaukee, where they learn about Jeffrey Dahmer by taking a tour of the places that Dahmer used to frequent before meeting with his defense attorney, Wendy Patrickus. David then visits Dallas, where he undertakes two very different tours regarding the assassination of JFK. His time in America comes to a close in New Orleans, where he spends time with some real-life vampires.
4	"The Stans"	20 July 2018
In Kazakhstan David joins dark tourist Andy and together they visit the city of Kurchatov, where they learn about the nearby Semipalatinsk Test Site, the primary testing site for the Soviet Union’s nuclear weaponry. David then travels across Kazakhstan to Baikonur, a closed city and the home of the Soviet space program. Flying across the border, David visits the Turkmen capital Ashgabat, where he sees the cult of personality built around president Gurbanguly Berdimuhamedow, before attempting, and failing, to visit the Gates of Hell. After a brief trip to hospital, David hopes to see the opening ceremony of the 2017 Asian Indoor and Martial Arts Games.
5	"Europe"	20 July 2018
Just outside of Maidstone, David takes part in the world's biggest World War II re-enactment. After surviving a mock battle, David travels the width of England to Littledean, where he visits a controversial museum that includes an exhibit dedicated to Fred & Rose West as well as a Nazi-era lampshade supposedly made from human skin. As a result of his museum trip, David receives a phone call from Charles Bronson. He then travels across Europe to Cyprus, where he tries to sneak in to Famagusta, a walled off ghost city.
6	"Southeast Asia"	20 July 2018
At a Phnom Penh shooting range backed by the Cambodian Army, David gets his hands on a range of heavy artillery and is faced with a moral dilemma. Journeying to Myanmar, David visits the brand new capital city, Naypyidaw, which he discovers is significantly quieter than most capitals. Flying to Indonesia, David meets a Toraja man who has been ‘resting’ for two years and participates in the Ma’nene funeral rite.
7	"Africa"	20 July 2018
In Ouidah, Benin, David learns more about Voodoo, and undergoes a voodoo disciple rite under the god Thron. Then he attends a much more violent Kokou ceremony on Lake Nokoué, with the Tofinu who live on the island of Ganvié. Travelling to Johannesburg, he investigates Alexandra township to see just how dangerous such townships are. David’s time in South Africa draws to a close in Orania, where he meets a small group of Afrikaner nationalists before moving further north to Randfontein and meeting the Suidlander survivalists.
8	"Back in the USA"	20 July 2018
Returning to the USA, David arrives in Los Angeles, where he partakes in a tour of the Manson Family murders and meets with fans and friends of Manson. David flies across the country to Kentucky, where he visits a full-scale replica of Noah’s Ark before meeting a prepper in Virginia. His final stop sees him visit Tennessee where he visits the scariest horror house in the world: McKamey Manor.

== Reception ==
On Rotten Tomatoes the series has a 70% rating based on reviews from 20 critics.
