= Media responsibility in New Zealand =

Media responsibility is taking ownership and being accountable for the broadcasting or publishing of material. Broadcasting and publishing is bound by law to meet specified criteria designed to protect the rights of individuals and society as a whole. There are usually separate criteria governing media aimed towards children and young people. These criteria are defined by law and vary from country to country. Anyone can make a complaint about a publication or broadcast in New Zealand that they believe does not comply with the criteria. Different criteria apply to TV/radio programmes, a newspaper article, privacy issues, an advertisement in any media, and any human rights issue, including discrimination and bias.

The Broadcasting Standards Authority handles complaints from members of the public about TV and radio programmes, and also breaches of privacy by a broadcast or publication in any media. The Office of Film and Literature Classification handles complaints about movies, films, videos and literature. The New Zealand Media Council website offers a complaints service for any article published in a newspaper that is not an advertisement. All advertising complaints in New Zealand are processed through the Advertising Standards Authority regardless of the media in which they were published or broadcast.

All human rights issues and complaints, regardless of media, can be raised with the Human Rights Commission in New Zealand. The Human Rights Commission will uphold complaints where discrimination or bias has been shown in media reporting. Discrimination issues include those relating to race, ethnicity, age, disability, sexual orientation, religion and other issues.
