= New Zealand Media Council =

Body overseeing complaints against print media

The New Zealand Media Council Te kaunihera ao pāpāho o Aotearoa
- Formation: 1972
- Merger of: Online Media Standards Authority
- Legal status: Incorporated society
- Purpose: Media regulation
- Headquarters: Wellington
- Key people: Mary Major (Executive Director), Raynor Asher (Chair)
- Revenue: 264,304 NZD (2020)
- Expenses: 248,796 NZD (2020)
- Website: www.mediacouncil.org.nz
- Formerly called: The New Zealand Press Council

The New Zealand Media Council (Māori: Te kaunihera ao pāpāho o Aotearoa) is a non-governmental organisation which exists to uphold standards in the New Zealand media industry and promote freedom of speech in New Zealand. Founded in 1972 as the New Zealand Press Council, it is enabled to hear complaints against newspapers and other publications, particularly regarding allegations of bias and inaccuracy. It can order an offending publication to publish a summary of the Council's ruling, and will generally specify the prominence of the summary (for example, where in the newspaper).

The Council consists of an independent chair, five members representing the public, two representing the Newspaper Publishers’ Association, one representing magazine publishers, and two journalists who are appointed by the E tū union. The members of the public are appointed by an appointments panel composed of members of E tū union, the Newspaper Publishers' Association, the chief ombudsman and the chair. The council is primarily funded by the News Publishers' Association with smaller contributions from member fees and E tū union.

== Scope and jurisdiction ==
The Council's jurisdiction only applies to the media entities which are members of the council. In addition to newspapers, magazines and other websites with journalistic content, since 2017 the media council also has jurisdiction over online media.

Under its founding principles, the council seeks to uphold professional media standards and promote media freedom.

Complaints can be made about individual articles, series of articles, non publication of materials and on other bases. Complaints must be lodged within one to two months of the publishing of the media in question for the council to consider the complaint.

Complaints that have been upheld by the media council are expected to be published on the media entity's platform and be given due prominence. The council however, does not have the statutory powers required to enforce rulings or sanction offending publishers.

== Complaint process ==
1. The complainant must first lodge a complaint with the editor of the media entity within a certain time frame depending on the nature of the complaint. The media entity must be given 10 working days to reply. If the complainant does not find the reply satisfactory or the entity does not reply within the 10 days, the complaint can be referred to the Media Council.
2. The complainant lodges a complaint with the media council. The complainant must provide the material subject to complaint, correspondence with the editor of the responsible media entity and a summary of the complaint.
3. The council will first assess the complaint and subsequently refer the complaint either to the chair, council committees or the full council. The chair has the powers to decline a complaint while the council committees may make rulings on some complaints.
4. The council refers the complaint back to the publication and the subsequent response from the media entity is made available to the complainant. The complainant may then reply to the response.
5. The council will make a ruling at its next meeting.

== Statistics ==
Of the 86 rulings issued in 2017, 17 (20%) were upheld either in full or in part. The rulings upheld in full without dissent include two rulings against The New Zealand Herald and Stuff, and one ruling against The Press, Sunday Star-Times and Waikato Weekly.

== Significant cases ==
=== Promotional content ===
In 2017, a complaint was laid against Stuff and The New Zealand Herald regarding 'recommended' and 'promotional stories' sections which appears at the bottom of articles. The complainant argued that claims made in these sections were false and amounted to advertisement. Despite objections from the Herald and Stuff on the basis that the advertising was not within the control of the editorial team and therefore within the jurisdiction of the council, the council accepted the complaint for consideration. The council argued that the content is under its jurisdiction since it was published in a way that made it look like news. The council upheld the complaint under the principle of accuracy, fairness and balance and the broader ethical considerations as the visual cues on the website 'are designed to confuse', however did not rule on the content as it is hosted offshore. In response to the ruling, NZME (which owns the Herald) announced that it would make changes to the Outbrain widget by separating advertising from Herald articles and labelling advertising as 'paid content'. Stuff also changed the heading of its advertising to 'paid content'.

== History ==
In 1988, the council broadened its jurisdiction and began accepting membership from magazines.

In 2002, the council broadened its jurisdiction to include content published online by its members.

In 2012, Peter Fa'afiu became its first public member of Pasifika descent.

In March 2013 the Law Commission proposed moving complaints about news and current affairs out of the jurisdiction of the Press Council, the Broadcasting Standards Authority and the Online Media Standards Authority, placing them under a proposed new body, the News Media Standards Authority. This recommendation was not followed and instead the Online Media Standards Authority (OMSA) was created to close a regulatory gap in regards to online news and current affairs programmes.

In 2014, the council broadened its jurisdiction and began accepting membership from blogs, following a review by the Newspaper Publishers' Association.

In 2017 in an effort to avoid duplication, OMSA was integrated into The Press Council to become the NZ Media Council. The Media Council consequently broadened its jurisdiction to accept complaints related to the online platforms of newspapers and magazines that were previously under the jurisdiction of OMSA.

== See also ==
- Media responsibility in New Zealand
