= Broadcasting Act 1989 =

New Zealand law

New Zealand Parliament
- Long title: An Act to provide for the maintenance of programme standards in broadcasting in New Zealand; and to establish the Broadcasting Standards Authority and to define its functions and powers; and to establish the Broadcasting Commission and to define its functions and powers; and to enable political parties to broadcast election programmes for Parliamentary elections free of charge; and to repeal the Broadcasting Act 1976; and to provide for matters incidental thereto
- Assented to: 27 May 1989; 36 years ago
- Commenced: 1 July 1989
- Administered by: Ministry for Culture and Heritage; Te Puni Kōkiri; Ministry of Justice

Repeals
- Broadcasting Act 1976

Related legislation
- Electoral Act 1993

Summary
- Public broadcasting, broadcasting standards and political advertising
- Status: Current legislation

The Broadcasting Act 1989 is a statute of the New Zealand Parliament that creates a system of broadcasting standards and the Broadcasting Commission (NZ On Air) to fund public broadcasting and New Zealand independent producers.

It established the Broadcasting Standards Authority, which oversees the broadcasting standards regime in New Zealand. The authority is an independent Crown entity, so the New Zealand Government cannot directly influence its work, although it can provide high-level guidance.

The act also establishes NZ On Air, formally the Broadcasting Commission, which funds public broadcasting and independent media production in New Zealand. NZ On Air was originally created to encourage payment of the NZ$110 Public Broadcasting Fee, which was abolished in 1999. Since then, the commission has received its funding directly from the Ministry for Culture and Heritage.

Part 6 sets out the law covering election advertising on radio and television by parties and electorate candidates, the allocation of time and money to political parties for this purpose by the Electoral Commission, and the requirements for broadcasters to supply returns of election advertising.
