= Broadcasting Standards Authority =

Upholds standards for radio and TV in New Zealand

- Māori: Te Mana Whanonga Kaipāho

Agency overview
- Formed: 1 July 1989; 37 years ago
- Type: Crown entity
- Jurisdiction: New Zealand Government
- Headquarters: Level 2 119 Ghuznee Street Wellington, New Zealand; 41°17′33″S 174°46′20″E
- Employees: 9
- Minister responsible: Hon Paul Goldsmith, Minister for Media and Communications
- Agency executive: Susie Staley, Chairperson
- Key document: Broadcasting Act 1989
- Website: www.bsa.govt.nz

The Broadcasting Standards Authority (BSA; Māori: Te Mana Whanonga Kaipāho) is a New Zealand Crown entity created by the Broadcasting Act 1989 to develop and uphold standards of broadcasting for radio, free-to-air and pay television.

== Functions and mandate ==
The main functions of the BSA are:

- Oversight and development of the broadcasting standards system
- Complaints determination
- Education and engagement

In June 2021, Minister of Internal Affairs Jan Tinetti announced a review of New Zealand's content regulatory system, saying the current system is confusing for content providers and consumers, with consumers having no single complaints process, and some content providers being regulated by multiple regimes. The review aims 'to design a modern, flexible and coherent regulatory framework' that will better protect New Zealanders from harmful or illegal content.

=== Standards ===
The current broadcasting standards codebook was released in July 2022 and applies to all broadcasters and broadcasts except election programming. The codebook contains eight standards:

- Offensive and disturbing content (standard 1): "Broadcast content should not seriously violate community standards of taste and decency or disproportionately offend or disturb the audience, taking into account the context of the programme and the wider context of the broadcast, and the information given by the broadcaster to enable the audience to exercise choice and control over their own, and children's, viewing or listening."
- Children's interests (standard 2): "Broadcasters should ensure children [under 14] can be protected from content that might adversely affect them."
- Promotion of illegal or antisocial behaviour (standard 3): "Broadcast content should not be likely to promote illegal or serious antisocial behaviour taking into account the context and the audience's ability to exercise choice and control."
- Discrimination and denigration (standard 4): "Broadcast content should not encourage discrimination against, or denigration of, any section of the community on account of sex, sexual orientation, race, age, disability, occupational status or as a consequence of legitimate expression of religion, culture or political belief."
- Balance (standard 5): "When controversial issues of public importance are discussed in news, current affairs or factual programmes, broadcasters should make reasonable efforts, or give reasonable opportunities, to present significant viewpoints either in the same broadcast or in other broadcasts within the period of current interest unless the audience can reasonably be expected to be aware of significant viewpoints from other media coverage."
- Accuracy (standard 6): "Broadcasters should make reasonable efforts to ensure news, current affairs and factual content is accurate in relation to all material points of fact and does not materially mislead the audience (give a wrong idea or impression of the facts). In the event a material error of fact has occurred, broadcasters should correct it within a reasonable period after they have been put on notice."
- Privacy (standard 7): "Broadcasters should maintain standards consistent with the privacy of the individual."
- Fairness (standard 8): "Broadcasters should deal fairly with any individual or organisation taking part or referred to in a broadcast."

=== Complaints ===
Except for complaints concerning election programming or solely related to privacy, complaints about broadcasting standards must first be made to the broadcaster. The complainant has 20 working days from the date of the original broadcast to submit a written formal complaint to the broadcaster, specifying the programme name, channel, date and time of broadcast, and the standard(s) believed to have been breached. The broadcaster must respond within 20 working days, or within 40 working days if an extension is requested.

If the complainant is dissatisfied with the broadcaster's response, or receives no response within the required timeframe, the complaint may then be referred to the BSA. The BSA may uphold, not uphold, or decline to determine the complaint. If a breach is found, the BSA has the authority to order remedies such as broadcasting a statement, awarding costs to the Crown or the complainant, suspending advertising, or, in serious cases, prohibiting broadcasts for up to 24 hours. In rare cases, the BSA may also award costs against the complainant in favour of the broadcaster, particularly where a complainant files repeat frivolous, trivial, or vexatious complaints.

Decisions of the BSA may be appealed to the High Court within one month of the decision's release.

== Leadership and structure ==
The BSA is made up of a board appointed for a fixed term by the Governor-General on the advice of the Minister of Broadcasting and Media, meaning that practically the Minister (and Cabinet) appoint the board. The chair is always a barrister or solicitor. One member is appointed after consultation with broadcasters and one after consultation with public interest groups.

Current members of the board including chair Susie Staley MNZM, Pulotu Tupe Solomon-Tanoa'i, John Gillespie and Aroha Beck.

== Planned disestablishment ==
On 6 May 2026, the Minister for Media and Communications Paul Goldsmith confirmed that the New Zealand Government would introduce legislation to disestablish Broadcasting Standards Authority (BSA). He confirmed that the New Zealand Media Council would assume its broadcasting regulatory functions and responsibilities, with the goal of the media sector becoming "self-regulatory." Goldsmith had previously hinted that that the Government was seeking to abolish the BSA in response to the regulator claiming oversight over online radio station The Platform and its co-founder Sean Plunket in late March 2026. In response, the BSA's chief executive Stacey Wood said that the Broadcasting Act 1989 was "no longer fit for purpose" due to advances in Internet and social media and said that the BSA would "assist with the transition to the new arrangement." The Media Council's chair Brook Cameron said the organisation would engage with the governments on their future plans for the BSA.

Plunket, who had been the subject of the BSA investigation, welcomed the decision as "good news for freedom of speech and New Zealanders." While New Zealand First leader Winston Peters and ACT Member of Parliament Laura McClure have advocated the abolition of the BSA, former BSA member Pulotu Tupe Solomon-Tanoa'i and Victoria University of Wellington media and film associate professor Peter Thompson expressed concern that abolishing the broadcasting regulator would remove a mechanism for the public to hold broadcasters accountable and counter negative racist stereotypes about Māori, Pasifika and other ethnic minorities, and would lead to declining standards of balance, fairness and accuracy in the media.

On 22 September 2026, the New Zealand Government introduced legislation into Parliament to disestablish the Broadcasting Standards Authority.

== See also ==
- Media responsibility in New Zealand
