= The Platform (radio station) =

New Zealand internet radio station

- Wellington and Central Otago; New Zealand

Programming
- Language: English
- Format: Current affairs, News, Sport

Ownership
- Owner: Sean Plunket

History
- First air date: September 2021; 5 years ago

Links
- Webcast: Listen Live
- Website: theplatform.kiwi

The Platform is a New Zealand online content platform, founded by former MagicTalk broadcaster Sean Plunket in September 2021. The station is fully owned and operated by Plunket. Notable hosts include Plunket, Otago Regional Council member Michael Laws and Leah Panapa.

== Editorial standpoint ==
The Platform describes itself as an 'independent media site' giving listeners 'unbiased coverage commentary and opinion and the chance to have your say on the issues that affect you.' The station claims to be independent of government funding and political interference. The Platform promotes itself as an alternative to 'taxpayer-funded media' and so-called 'woke culture warriors' whom it accuses of seeking to 'stifle debate and suffocate democracy.' It is listed on the New Zealand Companies Office's website as a recorded media and publishing company based in the Wellington suburb of Te Aro.

The station has been described as aimed to an "agitated audience on topics they feel journalists have ignored, like Three Waters and co-governance", promoting the idea that mainstream media has been "poisoned" by the New Zealand Government's Public Interest Journalism Fund. Stuff journalist Charlie Mitchell, Auckland University of Technology (AUT) head of journalism Greg Treadwell and AUT researcher Danielle Selman Julian have described The Platform—along with Reality Check Radio and the Centrist—as part of a wave of "anti-establishment media" that emerged in New Zealand during the post-COVID-19 period as a "backlash" against traditional media coverage of cultural and political issues.

== Hosts and programming ==
The Platform's hosts have included founder and veteran broadcaster Sean Plunket, former Newstalk ZB sports broadcaster Martin Devlin, Leah Panapa and former National Party Member of Parliament (MP) and Otago Regional Council member Michael Laws. As of May 2024, Plunket hosts the breakfast slot from 7am to 10am; Laws hosts the 10am to 1pm slot and Panapa hosts the afternoon slot 1pm to 4pm. In addition, former National Party press secretary Ani O'Brien served as The Platform's digital engagement editor until a workplace dispute with Plunket. Its hosts have been described as "semi-cancelled" by Stuff. In October 2024, Devlin departed from The Platform.

Notable guests have included columnist Chris Trotter, blogger Martyn Bradbury, former National Party leader Don Brash, former Dominion Post editor Karl du Fresne, ACT Party leader David Seymour, New Zealand First leader Winston Peters, Labour Party Member of Parliament (MP) and Prime Minister of New Zealand Chris Hipkins, former Labour MP Michael Bassett, Counterspin Media founder and right-wing activist Kelvyn Alp, Voices for Freedom spokesperson Alia Brand, anti-vaccine influencer Chantelle Baker, former All Blacks coach Steve Hansen, and Team New Zealand sailor Grant Dalton.

According to Plunket, The Platform's content consisted of 12 hours of live talkback radio including Plunket's show Plunket Unchained, hourly news bulletins, regular headlines, and talkback calls. Other content has included podcasts that were sourced internally and externally as well as op-ed columns. In addition to its website, The Platform is available as a mobile app on both iOS and Android operating systems. Since The Platform operates exclusively in the digital media sphere, the national broadcasting regulator Broadcasting Standards Authority (BSA) has no jurisdiction over its activities.

== Funding and ownership ==
Per Plunket's policy, The Platform does not receive public funding such as the Government's Public Interest Journalism Fund due to its requirement for recipients to adhere to the principles of the Treaty of Waitangi, which he regarded as a limitation on free speech. The Platform was funded by both Plunket and the Tauranga-based Wright family, who own the preschool provider BestStart, which has 270 branches across New Zealand. Up until August 2025 the Wrights own 75% of the station's shares while Plunket owns the remaining 25%.

In late July 2025, Plunket confirmed that the Wright family had ceased providing operational funding to The Platform in March 2025. While Wayne Leslie Wright remained a director of the company, his relatives were not involved. Wright still owned 75% of company's shares while Plunket owned the remaining 25%. By late July 2025, The Platform had reached 400,000 live listening hours a month while its YouTube channel had 68,000 subscribers. According to Wright and Plunket, the radio station relied on advertising revenue, subscriptions, donations and merchandise sales to fund its operating expenses. In early September 2025, Plunket gained full ownership of The Platform after Wayne Wright Jr. sold his majority stake in the company to Plunket for a confidential sum.

== History ==
=== Origins and launch ===
In September 2021, veteran broadcaster Sean Plunket announced that he would start his own online talkback radio station called The Platform, which he said would promote free speech, democracy and debate. Plunket had previously served as a host on the talkback radio station Magic Talk until February 2021. In December 2020, the BSA had reprimanded and fined Magic Talk's parent company MediaWorks New Zealand the sum of NZ$3,000 for what it described as an "offensive and harmful interview" between Plunket and a Te Whānau ā Apanui spokesperson regarding roadblocks in the Northland Region during the COVID-19 pandemic in New Zealand.

In early February 2022, Plunket confirmed that former Newstalk ZB sports broadcaster Martin Devlin, former National Party MP Michael Laws, and Leanne Malcolm would be joining The Platform as hosts. During an interview with The Spinoff managing editor Duncan Greive, Plunket said that The Platform would feature talkback, podcasts and opinion. While Plunket did not confirm a launch date for the media outlet, he stated that he would be "soft launching" the website and app between March and April 2022. Plunket and his co-hosts were also joined by digital engagement editor Ani O'Brien, who had previously served as press secretary to former National Party leader Judith Collins.

Plunket initially published The Platform as a website carrying interviews and opinion pieces by staff writers and guests. By mid-May 2022, the station had established two studios in Wellington and Central Otago and was broadcasting online 11 hours daily. By September 2022, majority shareholder Wayne Wright claimed that the radio station had attracted a million views a month across its various platforms.

In November 2023, The Spinoff reported that The Platform founders Wayne Wright Jr and Sean Plunket had met with NZME CEO Michael Boggs in late October 2023 to discuss a possible relationship between the two media companies. According to Wright, the meeting focused on how the two companies could learn from each other rather than a potential acquisition by NZME. Wright also told The Platform that Plunket was wary of losing editorial independence through a possible merger. Wright stated that NZME was interested in The Platform's product development while The Platform was interested in learning about commercial development.

=== Coverage of COVID-19 issues ===
In mid February 2022, The Platform published the results of David Farrar's Curia Market Research survey on the composition of protesters who took part in the 2022 Wellington protest which occupied the grounds of the New Zealand Parliament. This survey looked at the hometowns, gender, ethnicity, voting patterns, vaccination status, and motivations of the protesters. Farrar's survey found that 76.9% of protesters were unvaccinated; 4.8% had received one shot; 13.8% had received a double shot; and that 2.9% had been triple boosted. The survey also found that most protesters were motivated by opposition to vaccine mandates, freedom of choice, concerns about children being vaccinated, and the loss of jobs resulting from vaccine mandates.

In response to the release of Stuff's Circuit documentary Fire and Fury which looked at the groups and figures who led the 2022 Wellington protest, The Platform hosted several of these figures and groups including Chantelle Baker, Kelvyn Alp and Voices for Freedom. Since the producers of Fire and Fury including Stuff journalist Paula Penfold had declined to interview these figures and groups to avoid "platforming" them and their views, The Platform hosted them in order to enable them to "give their side of the story" and respond to the documentary. These interviews were widely circulated on various social media platforms. In response, Penfold likened Platform founder Plunket to American right-wing broadcaster and conspiracy theorist Alex Jones. She claimed that Plunket's decision to host these individuals and groups stripped The Platform of "journalist credibility" and alleged that he incited hatred against mainstream journalists.

According to The Spinoff journalist Duncan Greive, The Platform had hosted several anti-COVID mandates and anti vaccine advocates including former ACT Party leader Rodney Hide, former TVNZ broadcaster Peter Williams, and Baker. In addition, former Radio New Zealand broadcaster Paul Brennan helped establish The Platform, using his knowledge of radio infrastructure. Though the radio station attracted massive online engagement for its clips interviewing Baker and Voices of Freedom, Plunket and co-founder Wayne Wright Junior decided to stop working with anti-vaccination advocates in late 2022 since Plunket regarded the anti-vaccination crowd as a "limited audience" that was "consumed with a single subject". Hide, Williams, Baker and Brennan subsequently joined Voices for Freedom's online radio station Reality Check Radio, which launched in March 2023.

=== O'Brien employment dispute ===
In mid-February 2023, the Employment Relations Authority (ERA) heard an employment dispute between Plunket and former Platform digital engagement editor Ani O'Brien. She testified that Plunket had acted aggressively on three occasions between May and June 2022, causing her mental health to deteriorate. While Plunket denied that he had an aggressive demeanour at work, he acknowledged that he had acted "appallingly" in times of "high stress." He also admitted that he lacked experience in managing multiple staff but had since received business and management guidance from Wayne Wright. However, Plunket disputed O'Brien's claims that he had created an unsafe work environment and accused her of undermining his leadership. Both Plunket and O'Brien are expected to make submissions to ERA at a later date, with the Authority expected to make a determination after that.

On 20 May 2024, O'Brien filed a second case against The Platform with ERA, seeking compensation for what she regarded as "unjustified dismissal" after claiming her former workplace was unsafe. O'Brien told the Authority that she had received a restructuring proposal from her former employers in May 2024, while awaiting the Authority's determination. O'Brien responded to the proposal and subsequently received a termination letter two days later. O'Brien claimed that The Platform had dismissed her due to her lengthy absence from work and her ERA claim. In response, The Platform director Wayne Wright contended that O'Brien's absence from work was a consequence of the restructuring and redundancy while Plunket denied the company had terminated her employment because of her legal proceedings against the company. During the hearing, O'Brien's lawyer Barbara Buckett argued that Plunket's workplace behavior contributed to O'Brien's decision to leave The Platform. The company's lawyer Michael O'Brien (no relation of O'Brien) told the Authority that O'Brien had failed to engage with her employers until her letter on 16 May 2024. O'Brien countered that she would have been willing to meet with her former employers under the "right circumstances" and said she had been communicating through her lawyer Buckett. Lawyers for The Platform and O'Brien have issued written submissions prior to the Authority's ruling.

On 10 February 2025, the Employment Relations Authority ruled in O'Brien's favour, awarding her compensation for humiliation, loss of dignity and injury to feelings in relation to her employment case against The Platform.

=== Coverage of transgender issues ===
The Platform covered the anti-transgender activist Kellie-Jay Keen-Minshull's ("Posie Parker") Auckland speaking event on 25 March 2023, which was disrupted by violent protesters which resulted in a 70-year-old woman being violently assaulted. Host Plunket denounced the violence as "mob rule" and described the cancellation of Keen's tour as "a victory for cancel culture and bullies in the trans and gay communities." He also gave priority to female talkback callers alleging that they had not been protected during the protest.

In April 2023, Plunket attracted media attention after asking Prime Minister Chris Hipkins during a press conference to define a woman. This was part of a recent international trend of politicians including British Labour Party leader Keir Starmer and former Scottish First Minister Nicola Sturgeon being asked in media interviews to define womanhood.

=== Misinformation ===
On 12 April 2023, Plunket claimed on The Platform that former Prime Minister Jacinda Ardern had been hiding her new speaking engagement from the public. After Ardern and The Spinoff confirmed the speaking engagement story was false, Plunket apologised and removed references to the fake Ardern ad from his and The Platform’s social media. He also encouraged his followers to delete any mentions of it as well.

In September 2023, Plunket claimed on The Platform that there were rumors that the media company Stuff had received financial support from the Māori iwi (tribe) Ngāi Tahu, which he claimed contributed to Stuff's alleged embrace of wokeness and critical race theory. Plunket's claims were disputed by Stuff's owner Sinead Boucher, who stated that the company did not have a financial relationship with Ngāi Tahu and suggested that the rumors were motivated by misogyny.

=== Radio Aotearoa partnership ===
On 14 August 2024, The Platform entered into a partnership with Radio Aotearoa owner George Ngatai to broadcast on its weekday morning frequencies from 9 September 2024. Radio Aotearoa confirmed that The Platform would retain editorial control over its content, including the Sean Plunket and Michael Laws shows. This partnership ceased in late 2025, with Radio Aotearoa no longer broadcasting programming from The Platform.

=== 2025 BSA complaint ===
In mid-October 2025, the Broadcasting Standards Authority (BSA) confirmed that it would investigate alleged racist remarks made by Sean Plunket about Māori tikanga on The Platform's 22 July 2025 programme. The complainant had lodged a complaint with the BSA after Plunket claimed that it was not subject to the BSA's jurisdiction. In outlining its complaint, the Broadcasting Standards Authority argued that The Platform met the Broadcasting Act 1989's legal definition of a broadcaster: namely "a person who broadcasts programmes; 'broadcasting' as any transmission of programmes; and 'programme' as sounds or visual images, or combination of, intended to inform, enlighten or entertain, or promote the interests of any person, or promote any product or service." In outlining its decision to investigate The Platform, the BSA's chief executive Stacey Wood said that the Authority had made a decision in 2019 to regulate online broadcasts but had paused it prior to the 2020 New Zealand general election due to anticipated regulatory changes.

In response, Plunket rejected the BSA's jurisdiction, contending that The Platform was not a broadcaster since it did not pay a licensing levy to the BSA. He also accused the regulatory body of overstepping its boundaries and called for it to be dismantled. In addition, New Zealand First leader and Foreign Minister Winston Peters and the Free Speech Union's chief executive Jillaine Heather accused the BSA of engaging in alleged censorship and "legislative overreach" by seeking to regulate podcasts and online media. Similar criticism of the BSA criticism was echoed by the ACT party and Caniwi Capital executive chairman Troy Bowker, with the latter promising to fund The Platform's legal fees. After the complainant received online abuse, Plunket urged his supporters to stop harassing the complainant.

On 31 March 2026, the BSA ruled that it had jurisdiction to accept the complainant's complaint about The Platform breaching Section 4 of the Broadcasting Act 1989 through Plunket's remarks about Māori tikanga. This decision marked the first time that the broadcasting regulator had extended its reach to an online-only show. In response, Plunket denounced the decision and argued that he should not be subject to the BSA because he was a webcaster rather than a broadcaster. In addition Peters, Seymour, and Heather denounced the BSA for alleged regulatory overreach and advocated abolishing the regulator. In response, the BSA defended its decision to pursue The Platform, stating that excluding online broadcastings would "create a significant gap in public protections." The Spinoff editor Duncan Greive regarded the BSA's decision as "logically incoherent" since online podcasters such as The Platform and Reality Check Radio did not pay broadcasting levies.

On 6 May 2026, the Minister for Media and Communications Paul Goldsmith confirmed that the New Zealand Government would introduce legislation to disestablish BSA. He had previously hinted that that the Government was seeking to abolish the BSA in response to the regulator claiming oversight over Plunket and The Platform. In response, Plunket welcomed the announcement as a "wonderful 4th birthday event," and described the abolition of the BSA as "good news for freedom of speech and New Zealanders." On 11 August 2026, the BSA upheld two complaints against The Platform; namely Plunket dismissing tikanga Māori as "mumbo jumbo" and Plunket subsequently revealing a complainant's identity on air.
