= Ngaio Marsh Awards =

Literary award for crime fictions in New Zealand

Ngaio Marsh Award for Best Crime Novel
- The first Ngaio Marsh Award trophy was presented in 2010
- Awarded for: Excellence in New Zealand crime, mystery, and thriller writing
- Country: New Zealand
- First award: 2010
- Website: http://www.facebook.com/NgaioMarshAward

The Ngaio Marsh Awards (formerly Ngaio Marsh Award), popularly called the Ngaios, are literary awards presented annually in New Zealand to recognise excellence in crime fiction, mystery, and thriller writing. The Awards were established by journalist and legal editor Craig Sisterson in 2010, and are named after Dame Ngaio Marsh, one of the four Queens of Crime of the Golden Age of Detective Fiction. The Award is presented at the WORD Christchurch Writers & Readers Festival in Christchurch, the hometown of Dame Ngaio.

== Beginnings ==
The Ngaio Marsh Award for Best Crime Novel was launched in 2010 by lawyer turned journalist Craig Sisterson, who wanted to create an opportunity for great New Zealand crime, mystery, and thriller writing to be recognised and celebrated. Local crime writers were often overlooked by festival organisers and books awards in New Zealand, despite international acclaim, and up until that point New Zealand, unlike most other English-speaking countries, did not have a specific award for crime, mystery, and thriller fiction.

Sisterson had been writing reviews and features about crime writers for a number of magazines and newspapers in New Zealand and Australia and had set up a website about New Zealand crime writing. Earlier in 2010, he had written an opinion piece, "Kiwis love crime fiction, but what about our own?" for Booknotes magazine saying that New Zealand had great crime writers who were not being supported locally, by bookstores, literary festivals, or awards, and it was time that changed.

After discussions with many people in the New Zealand book industry, Sisterson decided to launch the Ngaio Marsh Award at the Christchurch Writers Festival in 2010, honouring both contemporary crime writers and New Zealand's most famous mystery writer in her own hometown. He sought and received the blessing of Dame Ngaio Marsh's closest living relative to honour Dame Ngaio by using her name and an artistic impression of her likeness for New Zealand's first-ever crime fiction prize.

The inaugural award was intended to be presented at the biennial Christchurch Writers Festival in September 2010, but had to be postponed due to a severe earthquake that struck the city that month, leading to the cancellation of the festival. The first Ngaio Marsh Award was presented at a special event in Christchurch in December 2010, and won by the pseudonymous author Alix Bosco for the thriller Cut & Run. Bosco did not attend the presentation ceremony, but would later reveal 'herself' as New Zealand screenwriter and playwright Greg McGee in the lead-up to the 2011 Award.

The launch of the Award, and New Zealand crime writing in general, was featured in major newspapers and magazines in New Zealand, including the Sunday Star-Times, the Herald on Sunday, and the New Zealand Listener.

Neil Cross winning the 2012 Ngaio Marsh Award

== The Award ==
For the first three years of the Award, the winner received a distinctive handcrafted trophy designed and created by New Zealand sculptor and Unitec art lecturer Gina Ferguson, a full set of Ngaio Marsh novels, and a cash prize provided by the Christchurch Writers Festival Trust. The trophy depicted an artistic rendering of Dame Ngaio's famous visage in mother-of-pearl on a black velvet covered partially open book.

From 2013, the winners have received a framed plaque bearing the award logo, a selection of Ngaio Marsh novels, and a cash prize.

In 2016, a second category was added for debut crime novels, the Ngaio Marsh Award for Best First Novel, and in 2017 a new award for true crime and other non-fiction writing was added, the Ngaio Marsh Award for Best Non-Fiction. 2021 saw the addition of a further award, the Ngaio Marsh Award for Younger Readers.

== Award presentations ==
Following the postponement of the inaugural event when the biennial Christchurch Writers Festival was cancelled in 2010, the Award has been presented at a variety of events in association with the Christchurch Writers Festival, which has continued its support of the Award, each year. In 2011, the "Setting the Stage for Murder" event was held at the Christchurch Arts Festival, with all four finalists and internationally bestselling crime writers Tess Gerritsen and John Hart in attendance.

In 2012, 2014, and 2016 the Ngaios were presented at events as part of the Christchurch Writers Festival programme, in each case following the popular 'Great New Zealand Crime Debate'. In 2012 Australian crime writer Michael Robotham presented the Award, and in 2014 Icelandic crime writer Yrsa Sigurdardottir presented the Award. Sigurdardottir became a judge of the Ngaios from 2015.

== Winners and finalists ==
=== 2010 ===
The inaugural presentation was made in Christchurch after a standalone crime panel featuring two of the three finalists, Neil Cross and Vanda Symon, local crime writer Paul Cleave, and chaired by Sisterson. The third finalist, Alix Bosco, did not attend as it was a pseudonym for a "successful writer in other media" who wanted to keep their identity a secret. Bosco's debut thriller, CUT & RUN, was announced as the winner at the conclusion of the event, with representatives from publisher Penguin NZ accepting on the author's behalf.

- Cut & Run by Alix Bosco
  - Containment by Vanda Symon
  - Burial by Neil Cross

=== 2011 ===
The second presentation of the Ngaio Marsh Award was made following the "Setting the Stage for Murder" event held as part of the Christchurch Arts Festival in August 2011, which also included appearances by New York Times bestselling authors Tess Gerritsen and John Hart. At the event, acclaimed television screenwriter and playwright Greg McGee made his first appearance after revealing himself as Alix Bosco, the winner of the inaugural award, in a national newspaper in the lead-up to the 2011 Award.

- Blood Men by Paul Cleave
  - Hunting Blind by Paddy Richardson
  - Captured by Neil Cross
  - Slaughter Falls by Alix Bosco

=== 2012 ===
The third presentation was during an event at the 2012 Christchurch Writers Festival, which was held in temporary facilities as the city continued to recover from the devastating September 2010 and February 2011 earthquakes. Award-winning Australian crime writer Michael Robotham presented the Award to Neil Cross following the sold-out Great New Zealand Crime Debate. Cross's winning novel was a prequel to his award-winning television series Luther, starring Idris Elba.

- Luther: The Calling by Neil Cross
  - Collecting Cooper by Paul Cleave
  - By Any Means by Ben Sanders
  - Bound by Vanda Symon

=== 2013 ===
In the fourth year of the Award, the presentation was made privately as logistical issues didn't allow for a public event.

- Death on Demand by Paul Thomas
  - The Laughterhouse by Paul Cleave
  - Little Sister by Julian Novitz
  - The Faceless by Vanda Symon

=== 2014 ===
The 2014 presentation was made at the WORD Christchurch Writers Festival following the Great Crime Debate where finalist Paul Cleave competed in the negative team (rather ironically) debating the moot, 'Crime Doesn't Pay'. The negative team won in a landslide victory. Liam McIlvanney was in attendance to receive the award from Icelandic crime writer Yrsa Sigurdardottir

- Where The Dead Men Go - Liam McIlvanney
  - Joe Victim by Paul Cleave
  - Frederick's Coat by Alan Duff
  - My Brother's Keeper by Donna Malane

=== 2015 ===
The sixth presentation of the award was made at a special "Murder in the Court" event held at the Court Theatre in Christchurch in October.

- Five Minutes Alone - Paul Cleave
  - The Petticoat Men by Barbara Ewing
  - The Children's Pond by Tina Shaw
  - Swimming in the Dark by Paddy Richardson
  - Fallout by Paul Thomas

=== 2016 ===
The Seventh presentation of the award was at the Great New Zealand Crime Debate during WORD Christchurch Writers and Readers festival 2016, on 27 August 2016 at the Concert Hall of The Piano: Centre for Music and the Arts, Christchurch. This year there were two awards, one for best crime novel and one for best first novel.

==== Best Crime Novel ====
- Trust No One by Paul Cleave
  - Inside the Black Horse by Ray Berard
  - Made to Kill by Adam Christopher
  - The Legend of Winstone Blackhat by Tanya Moir
  - American Blood by Ben Sanders

==== Best First Novel (new award) ====
- Inside the Black Horse by Ray Berard
  - The Fixer by John Daniell
  - The Gentlemen’s Club by Jen Shieff
  - Twister by Jane Woodham

=== 2017 ===
The eighth presentation of the Ngaios was made at Scorpio Books in Christchurch on 28 October 2017, as part of a cocktail function followed by a literary pub quiz.

==== Best Crime Novel ====
- The Last Time We Spoke by Fiona Sussman
  - Pancake Money by Finn Bell
  - Spare Me The Truth by C. J. Carver
  - Red Herring by Jonothan Cullinane
  - Marshall's Law by Ben Sanders

==== Best First Novel ====
- Dead Lemons by Finn Bell
  - Red Herring by Jonothan Cullinane
  - The Ice Shroud by Gordon Ell
  - The Student Body by Simon Wyatt
  - Days Are Like Grass by Sue Younger

==== Best Non-Fiction (new award) ====
- In Dark Places: The confessions of Teina Pora and an ex-cops fight for justice by Michael Bennett
  - The Scene of the Crime by Steve Braunias
  - Double-Edged Sword by Simonne Butler with Andra Jenkin
  - The Many Deaths of Mary Dobie by David Hastings
  - Blockbuster!: Fergus Hume and the Mystery of a Hansom Cab by Lucy Sussex

=== 2018 ===
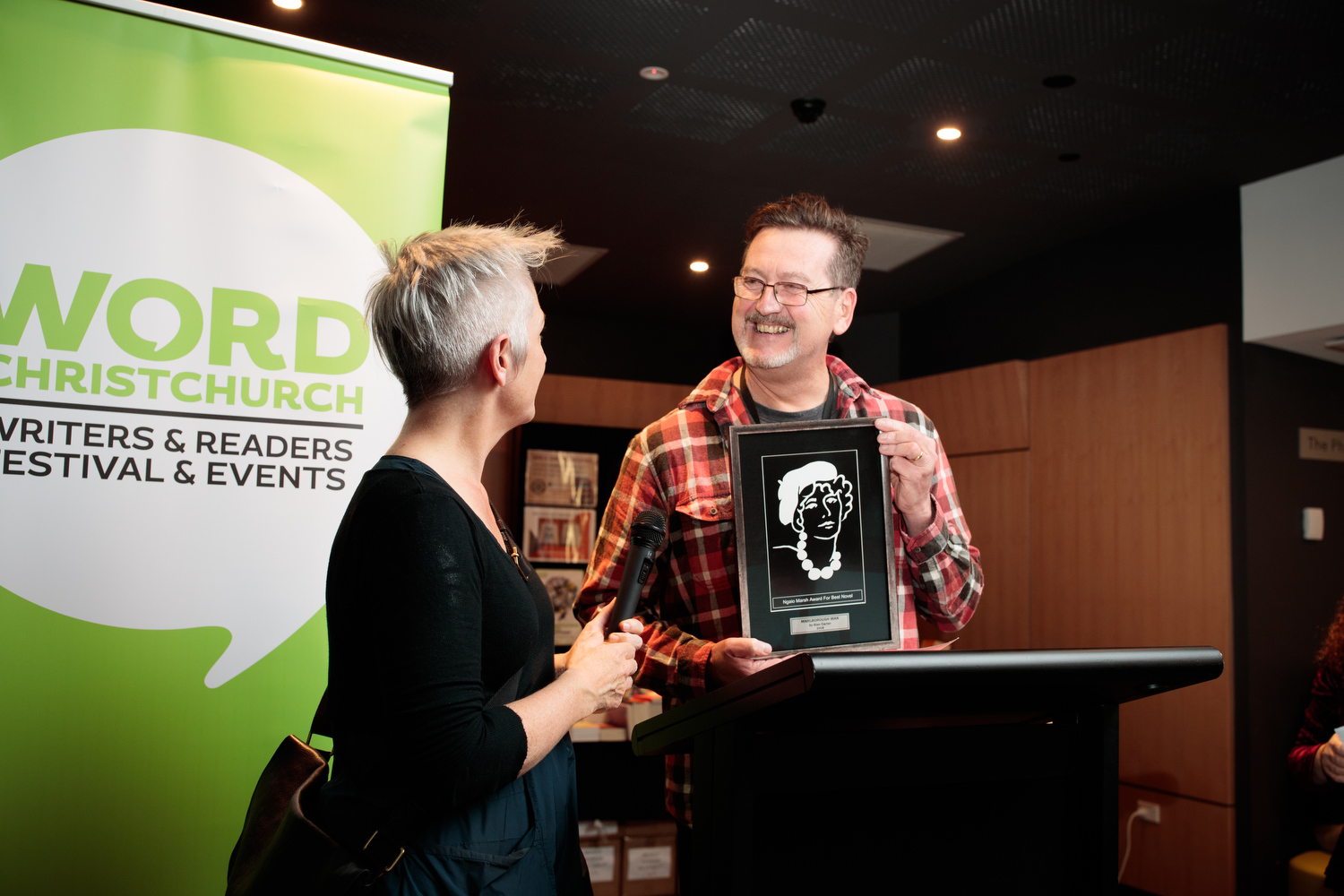
Alan Carter receiving the Ngaio Marsh Award at WORD Christchurch Festival, September 2018

The finalists were celebrated and winners announced at special event on 1 September 2018 as part of the 2018 WORD Christchurch Festival.

==== Best Crime Novel ====
- Marlborough Man by Alan Carter
  - See You in September by Charity Norman
  - Tess by Kirsten McDougall
  - The Sound of Her Voice by Nathan Blackwell
  - A Killer Harvest by Paul Cleave
  - The Hidden Room by Stella Duffy

==== Best First Novel ====
- All Our Secrets by Jennifer Lane
  - The Floating Basin by Carolyn Hawes
  - Broken Silence by Helen Vivienne Fletcher
  - The Sound of Her Voice by Nathan Blackwell
  - Nothing Bad Happens Here by Nikki Crutchley

=== 2019 ===
The shortlists were published on 2 August and the winners were announced on 14 September at WORD Christchurch.

==== Best Crime Novel ====
- This Mortal Boy by Fiona Kidman
  - Money in the Morgue by Ngaio Marsh and Stella Duffy
  - The Quaker by Liam Mcilvanney
  - Call Me Evie by J. P. Pomare
  - The Vanishing Act by Jen Shieff

==== Best First Novel ====
- Call Me Evie by J. P. Pomare
  - One for Another by Andrea Jacka
  - Crystal Reign by Kelly Lyndon

==== Best Non-Fiction ====
- The Short Life And Mysterious Death Of Jane Furlong by Kelly Dennett
  - The Great New Zealand Robbery by Scott Bainbridge
  - Behind Bars by Anna Leask
  - The Cause of Death by Cynric Temple-Camp

=== 2020 ===
The shortlists were published on 11 August and the winners were announced on 31 October at WORD Christchurch.

==== Best Crime Novel ====
- Auē by Becky Manawatu
  - Whatever it Takes by Paul Cleave
  - Girl from the Tree House by Gudrun Frerichs
  - The Nancys by R. W. R. McDonald
  - In the Clearing by J. P. Pomare
  - The Wild Card by Renée

==== Best First Novel ====
- The Nancys by R. W. R. McDonald
  - Into the Void by Christina O’Reilly
  - Tugga’s Mob by Stephen Johnson
  - Auē by Becky Manawatu

=== 2021 ===
The longlists were announced in July, while the shortlists were published on 16 September and the winners were announced on 30 October by WORD Christchurch.

==== Best Crime Novel ====
- Sprigs by Brannavan Gnanalingam
  - The Murder Club by Nikki Crutchley
  - The Tally Stick by Carl Nixon
  - The Secrets of Strangers by Charity Norman
  - Tell Me Lies by J. P. Pomare

==== Best First Novel ====
- For Reasons of Their Own by Chris Stuart
  - The Girl in the Mirror by Rose Carlyle
  - The Beautiful Dead by Kim Hunt
  - Where the Truth Lies by Karina Kilmore
  - While the Fantail Lives by Alan Titchall

==== Best Non-Fiction ====
- Black Hands: Inside the Bain family murders by Martin van Beynen
  - Weed: A New Zealand story by James Borrowdale
  - Rock College: An unofficial history of Mount Eden Prison by Mark Derby
  - From Dog Collar to Dog Collar by Bruce Howat
  - Gangland by Jared Savage

==== Best Younger Readers ====
- Katipo Joe: Blitzkrieg by Brian Falkner
  - Red Edge by Des Hunt
  - A Trio of Sophies by Eileen Merriman
  - Deadhead by Glenn Wood

=== 2022 ===
The longlists were announced in July, while the shortlists were published on 14 September and the winners were announced on 15 September by WORD Christchurch.

==== Best Crime Novel ====
- Before You Knew My Name by Jacqueline Bublitz
  - The Quiet People by Paul Cleave
  - Nancy Business by R. W. R. McDonald
  - She’s a Killer by Kirsten McDougall
  - The Devils You Know by Ben Sanders
  - Quiet in Her Bones by Nalini Singh

==== Best First Novel ====
- Before You Knew My Name by Jacqueline Bublitz
  - Shadow Over Edmund Street by Suzanne Frankham
  - Isobar Precinct by Angelique Kasmara
  - Waking the Tiger by Mark Wightman
  - Small Mouth Demon by Matt Zwartz

=== 2023 ===
The longlists were announced on 30 June, while the shortlists were published on 10 August. The winners will be announced in late August.

==== Best Crime Novel ====
- Remember Me by Charity Norman
  - Better the Blood by Michael Bennett
  - The Slow Roll by Simon Lendrum
  - Blood Matters by Renée
  - Exit .45 by Ben Sanders
  - The Doctor’s Wife by Fiona Sussman
  - Blue Hotel by Chad Taylor

==== Best Non-Fiction ====
- Missing Persons by Steve Braunias
  - The Devil You Know: Encounters in forensic psychiatry by Gwen Adshead & Eileen Horne
  - The Fix: The story of one of New Zealand’s biggest swindles by Scott Bainbridge
  - Downfall: The destruction of Charles Mackay by Paul Diamond
  - A New Dawn by Emeli Sione

==== Best First Novel ====
- Better the Blood by Michael Bennett
  - Paper Cage by Tom Baragwanath
  - Surveillance by Riley Chance
  - The Slow Roll by Simon Lendrum
  - One Heart One Spade by Alistair Luke
  - Too Far From Antibes by Bede Scott

=== 2024 ===
The longlists were announced in July 2024 and the shortlists were announced on 13 August 2024. The winners were announced on 23 August 2024.

==== Best Crime Novel ====
- Ritual of Fire by DV Bishop
  - Dice by Claire Baylis
  - The Caretaker by Gabriel Bergmoser
  - Pet by Catherine Chidgey
  - Devil's Breath by Jill Johnson
  - Going Zero by Anthony McCarten
  - Expectant by Vanda Symon

==== Best Younger Readers Novel ====
- Miracle by Jennifer Lane
  - Caged by Susan Brocker
  - Katipo Joe: Wolf's Lair by Brian Falkner
  - Nikolai's Quest by Diane Robinson
  - Nor’east Swell by Aaron Topp

==== Best First Novel ====
- Dice by Claire Baylis
  - El Flamingo by Nick Davies
  - Devil's Breath by Jill Johnson
  - A Better Class of Criminal by Cristian Kelly
  - Mama Suzuki : Private Eye by Simon Rowe

=== 2025 ===
The finalists were announced on 29 August 2025 and the winners were revealed on 25 September 2025.

==== Best Crime Novel ====
- Return to Blood by Michael Bennett
  - A Divine Fury by DV Bishop
  - Woman, Missing by Sherryl Clark
  - Home Truths by Charity Norman
  - 17 Years Later by J. P. Pomare
  - The Call by Gavin Strawhan
  - Prey by Vanda Symon

==== Best Non-Fiction ====
- The Crewe Murders by Kirsty Johnston and James Hollings
  - The Trials of Nurse Kerr by Scott Bainbridge
  - The Survivors by Steve Braunias
  - The Last Secret Agent by Pippa Latour and Jude Dobson
  - Gangster’s Paradise by Jared Savage
  - Far North by David White and Angus Gillies

==== Best First Novel ====
- The Defiance of Frances Dickinson by Wendy Parkins
  - Dark Sky by Marie Connolly
  - Lie Down with Dogs by Syd Knight
  - A Fly Under the Radar by William McCartney
  - The Call by Gavin Strawhan
  - Kiss of Death by Stephen Tester
