= The Clearing (TV series) =

Australian television series

- Genre: Psychological thriller
- Created by: Elise McCredie; Matt Cameron
- Based on: In the Clearing by J. P. Pomare
- Written by: Elise McCredie; Matt Cameron; Osamah Sami
- Directed by: Jeffrey Walker; Gracie Otto
- Starring: Teresa Palmer; Miranda Otto; Guy Pearce
- Composer: Mark Bradshaw
- Country of origin: Australia
- Original language: English
- No. of episodes: 8

Production
- Executive producers: Richard Finlayson; Elizabeth Bradley; Jeffrey Walker; Jude Troy; Elise McCredie; Matt Cameron
- Producer: Jude Troy
- Running time: 45–52 minutes
- Production companies: Egeria; Wooden Horse

Original release
- Network: Disney+
- Release: 24 May – 5 July 2023

The Clearing is an Australian psychological thriller miniseries produced for Disney+ and inspired by the dark story of a real-life cult with a female leader. The series premiered on 24 May 2023 on Disney+ and Hulu. Directed by Jeffrey Walker and Gracie Otto, it is based on the book In the Clearing by J. P. Pomare, a fictionalised account of the Australian cult group The Family, and stars Miranda Otto, Teresa Palmer, and Guy Pearce.

== Synopsis ==
A woman is forced to face the demons of her past in order to prevent a cult from kidnapping children.

== Cast ==
=== Main ===
- Teresa Palmer as Freya Heywood
- Miranda Otto as Adrienne Beaufort
- Guy Pearce as Dr. Bryce Latham

=== Supporting ===
- Julia Savage as Amy Beaufort
- Hazem Shammas as Yusuf Joe Saad
- Jeremy Blewitt as Anton Beaufort
- Kate Mulvany as Tamsin Latham
- Xavier Samuel as Colin Garrison
- Anna Lise Phillips as Hannah Wilczek
- Mark Coles Smith as Wayne Dhurrkay
- Harry Greenwood as Anton Beaufort
- Erroll Shand as Henrik Wilczek
- Doris Younane as Christine
- Claudia Karvan as Mariam Herzog
- Miah Madden as Max Dhurrkay
- Gary Sweet as Wilkes
- Alicia Gardiner as Judith
- Matt Okine as Devon
- Lily La Torre as Asha
- Ras-Samuel Welda’abzgi as Mo
- Berlin Lu as Kim Wu
- Kristof Kaczmarek as Ari Herzog
- Jake Schlieper as Paul Saad
- John Voce as Father Campbell
- Olivia Pawsey as Carrie Anderson

== Production ==
The series is produced by Wooden Horse and based on the best selling crime-thriller In the Clearing by J. P. Pomare and the real-life group The Family and their charismatic leader Anne Hamilton-Byrne. The series was adapted by Elise McCredie, Matt Cameron and Osamah Sami. Directed by Jeffrey Walker and Gracie Otto, the producer is Jude Troy and the executive producers are McCredie, Cameron and Walker with Richard Finlayson and Elizabeth Bradley.

=== Casting ===
Teresa Palmer, Miranda Otto, and Guy Pearce were confirmed as part of the cast in July 2022.

=== Filming ===
Principal photography began in Victoria, Australia in July 2022.

== Episodes ==
No.	Title	Directed by	Written by	Original release date
1	"The Season of Unfoldment"	Jeffrey Walker	Matt Cameron	24 May 2023
2	"Kindred"	Jeffrey Walker	Elise McCredie	24 May 2023
3	"Suffer the Little Children"	Gracie Otto	Matt Cameron	31 May 2023
4	"The Foundlings"	Gracie Otto	Elise McCredie	7 June 2023
5	"Maitreya"	Gracie Otto	Elise McCredie	14 June 2023
6	"The Pied Piper"	Gracie Otto	Matt Cameron & Osamah Sami	21 June 2023
7	"This Too Shall Pass"	Jeffrey Walker	Matt Cameron	28 June 2023
8	"Island"	Jeffrey Walker	Elise McCredie & Osamah Sami	5 July 2023

== Broadcast ==
The series was broadcast on Hulu in the United States and as a Star Original on Disney+ throughout the world from Wednesday, 24 May 2023 with new episodes being released weekly thereafter on Wednesdays.

== Reception ==
The series has an 89% approval rating on review aggregator website Rotten Tomatoes, based on 18 reviews, with an average rating of 6.5/10. The website's critical consensus reads, "Deriving extra flavor from its Australian setting and Miranda Otto's unsettling performance, The Clearing is an eerie thriller with plenty to recommend." Metacritic, which uses a weighted average, assigned a score of 61 out of 100 based on 7 critics, indicating "generally favorable reviews".

=== Accolades ===
The limited miniseries was nominated in the Best Miniseries category at the AACTA Awards, with Teresa Palmer receiving a nomination for Best Lead Actress in a Drama.

== See also ==
- List of Australian television series
