= Sarah Hamilton =

Sarah Hamilton may refer to:

- Sarah Hamilton (actress), Irish stage actress and singer of the eighteenth century
- Sarah Hamilton (historian), British historian
- Sarah Hamilton (runner), winner of the 1998 distance medley relay at the NCAA Division I Indoor Track and Field Championships

== See also ==
- Sarah Moore (The Family) (1969–2016), formerly known as Sarah Hamilton-Byrne
