= Overkill (novel) =

2007 novel by Vanda Symon

- Cover of the 2007 Penguin Books edition
- Author: Vanda Symon
- Language: English
- Publisher: Penguin Books
- Publication date: 2007

Overkill is the first novel by the New Zealand writer Vanda Symon. It was first published in March 2007 in New Zealand, by Penguin Books.

== Plot ==
When the body of a young mother is found washed up on the banks of the Mataura River, a small rural community is rocked by her tragic suicide. But all is not what it seems. Sam Shephard, sole-charge police constable in Mataura soon discovers the death was no suicide, and has to face the realisation that there is a killer in town. To complicate things the murdered woman was the wife of her former lover. When Sam finds herself on the list of suspects and suspended from duties she must cast aside her personal feelings and take matters into her own hands to find the murderer and clear her own name.
