= Jen Shieff =

Novelist and author from New Zealand

- Education: University of Auckland
- Occupations: Novelist; Writer
- Writing career
- Genres: Crime fiction; Historical fiction
- Notable works: The Gentlemen's Club, The Vanishing Act, The Final Call

Jen Shieff is a novelist and writer from New Zealand. She is the author of the historical crime novels The Gentlemen's Club (2015), The Vanishing Act (2018), and The Final Call (2022). Her novels are set in Auckland in the 1950s to 1970s, and explore several themes and social issues present at the time.

== Early life and career ==
Jen Shieff graduated from the University of Auckland with specializations in English literature and education. She taught at various schools and universities in Auckland including the Auckland University of Technology, before moving to Wellington in 1994. In Wellington, she worked as an analyst for the Government of New Zealand.

In 2001, Shieff and her partner moved to Turangi and established a fly-fishing lodge on the Tongariro River. She later resumed government work, commuting weekly between Turangi and Wellington for six years. She left public service in 2014 and began a full-time writer.

== Writing ==
Shieff has published three crime fiction novels each of which is set in successive decades from 1950s to 1970s in Auckland, with each novel functioning as a standalone sequel to its predecessor. Her novels explore various themes and changing attitude towards social issues including homosexuality, prostitution, abortion, and child abuse during the period. Her novels also examine the hypocrisy prevalent in the society during the time. Shieff became interested in writing historical fiction during her research into Auckland brothel owner Flora MacKenzie at the Alexander Turnbull Library, which inspired the recurring character Rita Saunders and the historical setting of the trilogy.

Shieff's first novel, The Gentlemen's Club, was published by Mary Egan Publishing in 2015. Set in 1957 Auckland, it follows the story of hairdresser and brothel owner Rita Saunders and explores several social issues through other characters in the novel. The novel was shortlisted for the Ngaio Marsh Award for the Best First Novel in 2016.

Her second novel, The Vanishing Act, was published in 2018 and is set in 1960s Auckland. The novel examines themes including homophobia, and academic power structures through the investigation of a murder. It was shortlisted for the Ngaio Marsh Award for Best Novel in 2019. Critics have noted her extensive historical research and the development of the plot which keeps the readers engrossed.

Her third novel, The Final Call, was published in 2022. Set in the 1970s against the backdrop of the Mount Erebus disaster, it explores changing attitudes toward prostitution, homosexuality and women during the late 1970s.

== Bibliography ==
- The Gentlemen's Club (2015)
- The Vanishing Act (2018)
- The Final Call (2022)
