= The Family (Australian New Age group) =

Controversial Australian New Age group

- Formation: mid-1960s
- Founder: Anne Hamilton-Byrne
- Type: New Age group / cult
- Legal status: Defunct
- Headquarters: Olinda, Victoria, Australia
- Location: Melbourne area (originally Ferny Creek, Dandenong Ranges)
- Leader: Anne Hamilton-Byrne

The Family, also known as the Santiniketan Park Association or the Great White Brotherhood, was an Australian New Age group formed in the mid-1960s under the leadership of Anne Hamilton-Byrne (born Evelyn Grace Victoria Edwards; 30 December 1921 – 13 June 2019). The group taught a mixture of Western and Eastern religious doctrines, with Hamilton-Byrne claiming to have been a reincarnation of Jesus. It has widely been described as a cult.

The group became the centre of controversy when its compound in Olinda, Victoria, was raided by police on 14 August 1987 amid allegations of child abuse. All children were removed from the premises, and were discovered to have been adopted through illegal means. Hamilton-Byrne and her husband were eventually arrested in 1993 and charged with conspiracy to defraud and to commit perjury in relation to the adoption scams, but those charges were eventually dropped. She pleaded guilty to the remaining charge of making a false declaration and was fined $5,000.

== Religious claims ==
The Family taught an eclectic mixture of Christianity and Hinduism with other Eastern and Western religions, on the principle that spiritual truths are universal. Children raised in the group studied the major scriptures of these religions as well as the works of gurus including Sri Chinmoy, Meher Baba, and Rajneesh. One adopted daughter, Sarah Hamilton-Byrne, later described the group's beliefs as a "hotch-potch" of Christianity and Eastern mysticism.

The basis of The Family's philosophy was that their founder, Anne Hamilton-Byrne, was the reincarnation of Jesus and a living god. Within the group, Jesus, Buddha, and Krishna were regarded as enlightened beings who came down to Earth to aid humanity, with Hamilton-Byrne being put in the same category as these teachers. On the basis of this belief, members of her inner circle claimed to be the reincarnations of the original Twelve Apostles.

== History ==
=== Beginnings ===
Beginning around 1964, Anne Hamilton-Byrne led a religious and philosophical discussion group at Santiniketan, the home of parapsychologist Raynor Johnson, on the eastern outskirts of Melbourne in the Dandenong Ranges suburb of Ferny Creek. The group purchased an adjoining property which they named Santiniketan Park in 1968 and constructed a meeting hall called Santiniketan Lodge.

The group consisted of middle-class professionals, a quarter of whom were medical personnel recruited by Johnson via Hamilton-Byrne's hatha yoga classes. Members mainly lived in the suburbs of Melbourne and in townships of the Dandenong Ranges, meeting each Tuesday, Thursday, and Sunday evening at Santiniketan Lodge, at Crowther House in Olinda, or another property in the area known as the White Lodge.

By the 1980s, police estimated that Hamilton-Byrne's fortune was as much as A$50 million.

=== Newhaven ===
During the late 1960s and 1970s, Newhaven Hospital in Kew was a private psychiatric hospital owned and managed by Marion Villimek, a Family member; many of its staff and attending psychiatrists were also members. The Family recruited some of the hospital's patients into the group, and administered the hallucinogenic drug LSD to both patients and members under the direction of Family psychiatrists John Mackay and Howard Whitaker. One of the original members of the Family was given LSD, electroconvulsive therapy, and two leucotomies during the late 1960s.

Although Newhaven Hospital had been closed down by 1992, an inquest was ordered that year into the death of a patient in 1975 that was alleged to have been due to deep sleep therapy. The inquest heard evidence concerning the use of electroconvulsive therapy, LSD, and other practices at Newhaven, but found no evidence that deep sleep had been used on the deceased patient. The hospital was later reopened as a nursing home with no connections to its previous owner or uses.

=== Kai Lama property ===
Hamilton-Byrne acquired fourteen infants and young children between 1968 and 1975. Some were the biological children of members of The Family; others had been obtained through illegal adoptions arranged by lawyers, doctors, and social workers within the group who could bypass normal protocols. The children's identities were changed using false birth certificates or deed polls. All were given the surname "Hamilton-Byrne" and made to dress alike, even to the extent that most had their hair being dyed uniformly blonde.

The children were kept in seclusion and home-schooled at Kai Lama, a rural property usually referred to as "Uptop", at Taylor Bay on Lake Eildon. All were told that Hamilton-Byrne was their biological mother and knew the other adults in the group as "aunties" and "uncles". They were denied almost all access to the outside world, and subjected to a discipline that included starvation diets and frequent, unprovoked beatings.

Doses of the psychiatric drugs fluphenazine, diazepam, haloperidol, chlorpromazine, nitrazepam, oxazepam, trifluoperazine, carbamazepine, or imipramine were frequently administered to the children. On reaching adolescence they were compelled to undergo an initiation process involving LSD; while under the influence of the drug the child would be left in a dark room, alone, apart from visits by Hamilton-Byrne or one of the psychiatrists from The Family.

=== Siddha Yoga ===
For several years, Hamilton-Byrne developed a connection to the Siddha Yoga movement, receiving shaktipat initiation from Swami Muktananda and taking the Sanskrit name Ma Yoga Shakti. In 1979 and 1981 she took some of the children to stay with Muktananda at his ashram at South Fallsburg, New York, United States, and purchased a nearby property as her own base in America.

Sarah Hamilton-Byrne later recalled how Muktananda would give a private audience (or darshan) once a week to The Family. He once asked the children if they would like to leave The Family and live with him at his Gurudev Siddha Peeth ashram in India. The children all gave an enthusiastic yes but were later punished by Hamilton-Byrne for disloyalty. According to Sarah, Hamilton-Byrne eventually caused a lot of trouble at the South Fallsburg ashram and some of Muktananda's devotees defected to The Family. Sarah was present when Swami Tejomayanand was initiated into The Family, later saying that she could not understand why he would want to join a sect where everyone was so miserable when it seemed that everyone around Muktananda was so happy.

=== Police intervention ===
In 1987, Hamilton-Byrne expelled Sarah from the group because of arguing and rebellious behaviour. With the support of a private investigator and others, she then played an instrumental role in bringing The Family to the attention of the Victoria Police. As a result of her efforts, a raid took place at Kai Lama on 14 August 1987, and all children were removed from the premises. Sarah later went on to study medicine and became a qualified doctor. She learned about her adoption and eventually met her biological mother.

After the raid, Hamilton-Byrne and her husband, William, left Australia for a period of six years. Operation Forest, an investigation involving police in Australia, the UK, and the US, resulted in their arrest in June 1993 by the FBI in New York. This followed admissions by former members of The Family, including the group's solicitor Peter Kibby, that the group had engaged in adoptions scams, including acts of forgery.

Hamilton-Byrne and her husband were extradited to Australia and charged with conspiracy to defraud and to commit perjury by falsely registering the births of three unrelated children as their own triplets, charges that were later dropped. Elizabeth Whitaker, the wife of Howard Whitaker, was their co-defendant. Hamilton-Byrne and her husband pleaded guilty to the remaining charge of making a false declaration and were fined $5,000 each. The conspiracy charges against Whitaker were dropped, but she was convicted of falsely obtaining nearly $23,000 between 1983 and 1987.

Other members of The Family were also tried at court. Margot MacLellan, aged 64, was convicted of falsely obtaining $28,000 between 1978 and 1988. Joy Travellyn, aged 56, was convicted of falsely obtaining over $38,000 between 1979 and 1988. Helen Buchanan, aged 49, was convicted of falsely obtaining almost $15,000 between 1980 and 1987.

=== Litigation ===
In August 2009, two individuals received financial compensation from Hamilton-Byrne after suing her. Her granddaughter, Rebecca Cook-Hamilton, had sued for alleged psychiatric and psychological illnesses, alleging malnourishment and "cruel and inhuman treatment" by Hamilton-Byrne and her followers. Her award was estimated to be $250,000.

Another former member of The Family, Cynthia Chan, alleged that she paid the sum of $352,115 to Hamilton-Byrne for real estate in Olinda, but the property was never transferred to her. She also alleged that she paid the sum of $70,400 to Hamilton-Byrne for another property, but this too was never transferred to her. Hamilton-Byrne said she had no memory of the transaction. Chan's judgement was estimated at $250,000.

== Aftermath ==
Hamilton-Byrne's husband died in 2001; she attended the funeral in her only public appearance following her conviction. In later years it was reported that Hamilton-Byrne was living in a Melbourne nursing home and suffering from dementia, and that an internal succession crisis for leadership of the group was unfolding. In an interview with ABC Local Radio in Ballarat, Ben Shenton, a former adoptee of The Family, said the group had become a "toothless tiger".

Sarah Moore (formerly known as Sarah Hamilton-Byrne) died in 2016, aged 46. Anne Hamilton-Byrne died on 13 June 2019, aged 97.

== Media ==
In 2016, a documentary on the sect entitled The Family was released at the Melbourne International Film Festival; it was produced by Anna Grieve and written, directed, and co-produced by Rosie Jones. It has been published on DVD by Label Distribution Pty Ltd, designated LAB005. A companion book, The Family: The Shocking True Story of a Notorious Cult (2017), was written by Chris Johnston and Jones and published by Scribe. Jones later released a three-episode miniseries, The Cult of the Family, in March 2019. The 2019 novel In the Clearing by J. P. Pomare is a fictionalised account heavily based on The Family. It was turned into a 2023 TV series, The Clearing, which was produced for Disney Plus and stars Teresa Palmer, Miranda Otto, and Guy Pearce.
