= Angelique Kasmara =

Indonesian-New Zealand fiction writer

- Born: Bandung, Indonesia
- Education: University of Auckland (MCW)
- Occupations: Writer; editor; translator
- Writing career
- Notable work: Isobar Precinct (2021)

Angelique Kasmara is an Indonesian New Zealand fiction writer, editor and translator. Her first novel, Isobar Precinct (2021), is one of the few literary novels published by an Asian New Zealand woman writer, and received critical praise.

== Early life and career ==
Kasmara was born in Bandung, Indonesia. Her family moved to New Zealand as refugees in 1972. She spent two years in the 1990s working in media publishing in Jakarta, before returning to New Zealand because of political unrest in Indonesia. In New Zealand she worked with refugee communities, and belongs to a Free West Papua group.

In 2016, Kasmara was awarded the Sir James Wallace Prize at the University of Auckland for best portfolio on the Master of Creative Writing programme. This prize was for the first draft of her novel Isobar Precinct, later a finalist for the $10,000 Michael Gifkins Prize for an unpublished manuscript. In 2018 she received a Michael King Emerging Writers Residency.

== Isobar Precinct ==
When Isobar Precinct was released by Cuba Press in 2021, Kasmara became one of the few Asian New Zealand women writers to publish a literary novel. The novel is a work of contemporary speculative fiction grounded in a gritty inner-city Auckland. Kasmara cites Kindred by Octavia Butler and Story of Your Life by Ted Chiang as influences while writing the book.

Isobar Precinct has been described as "epic, bold and cinematic". In a review published both in the New Zealand Herald and (in longer form) on the Academy of New Zealand Literature website, Tom Moody called it a "sparkling, stylish novel" that "reads nothing like a debut novel". Rachel O'Connor for literary journal Landfall described it as a "highly original, genre-bending cocktail of social realism, sci-fi, detective drama and fantasy, with a subtle dash of romance". The New Zealand Listener noted that the speculative fiction aspects of the novel allowed Kasmara "to examine some uncomfortable truths about human nature" and gave it "the feeling of a cult classic".

The novel was selected as one of the 100 best books of 2021 by the New Zealand Listener and was also included in the Best Books 2021 selection of the Academy of New Zealand Literature. The novel debuted at number three on the Nielsen BookScan New Zealand bestseller list. Isobar Precinct was also shortlisted in the Best First Novel category at the 2022 Ngaio Marsh Awards for crime and mystery fiction.

An excerpt from Isobar Precinct was selected for the 2021 anthology A Clear Dawn: New Asian Voices from Aotearoa New Zealand published by Auckland University Press. In the introduction to that anthology, the first-ever collection of work by Asian New Zealand writers, editors Alison Wong and Paula Morris note that among the 75 writers represented, five (including Kasmara) had provided excerpts from novels in development.

Another excerpt from Isobar Precinct appeared in the earlier anthology Ko Aotearoa Tātou / We Are New Zealand, published by Otago University Press in 2020. The novel was also featured by Kete Books in their "first chapters" section.

== Other writing ==
In 2011, Kasmara's story "Asians with Perms" received second place for the New Zealand Society of Authors (NZSA) Asian Short Story Award, judged by Renee Liang, Sue Gee, and Stevan Eldred-Grigg. She was one of six New Zealand writers commissioned by the Nelson Arts Festival to write and record a work of creative nonfiction for their 2021 Writing Home: An Antidote to Feeling Stranded digital series. Two of her short stories, "Distant Planet" and "A Bad Day for a Virgin Sail", were published in Planeta distante Aotearoa: ecos y voces de la larga nube blanca (Ediciones Del Lirio 2022), the first-ever bilingual Mexican anthology of New Zealand short fiction.

In October 2020 her short story "Mallrats" was published on the Newsroom site, and her short story, "Battle Lines", was published in the New Zealand Listener in January 2022.

== Bibliography ==
- Isobar Precinct (The Cuba Press, 2021)
- Excerpt from Isobar Precinct in A Clear Dawn: New Asian Voices from Aotearoa NZ anthology (2021)
- Excerpt from Isobar Precinct in Ko Aotearoa Tātou anthology (2020)
