= Jacqueline Bublitz =

New Zealand crime writer

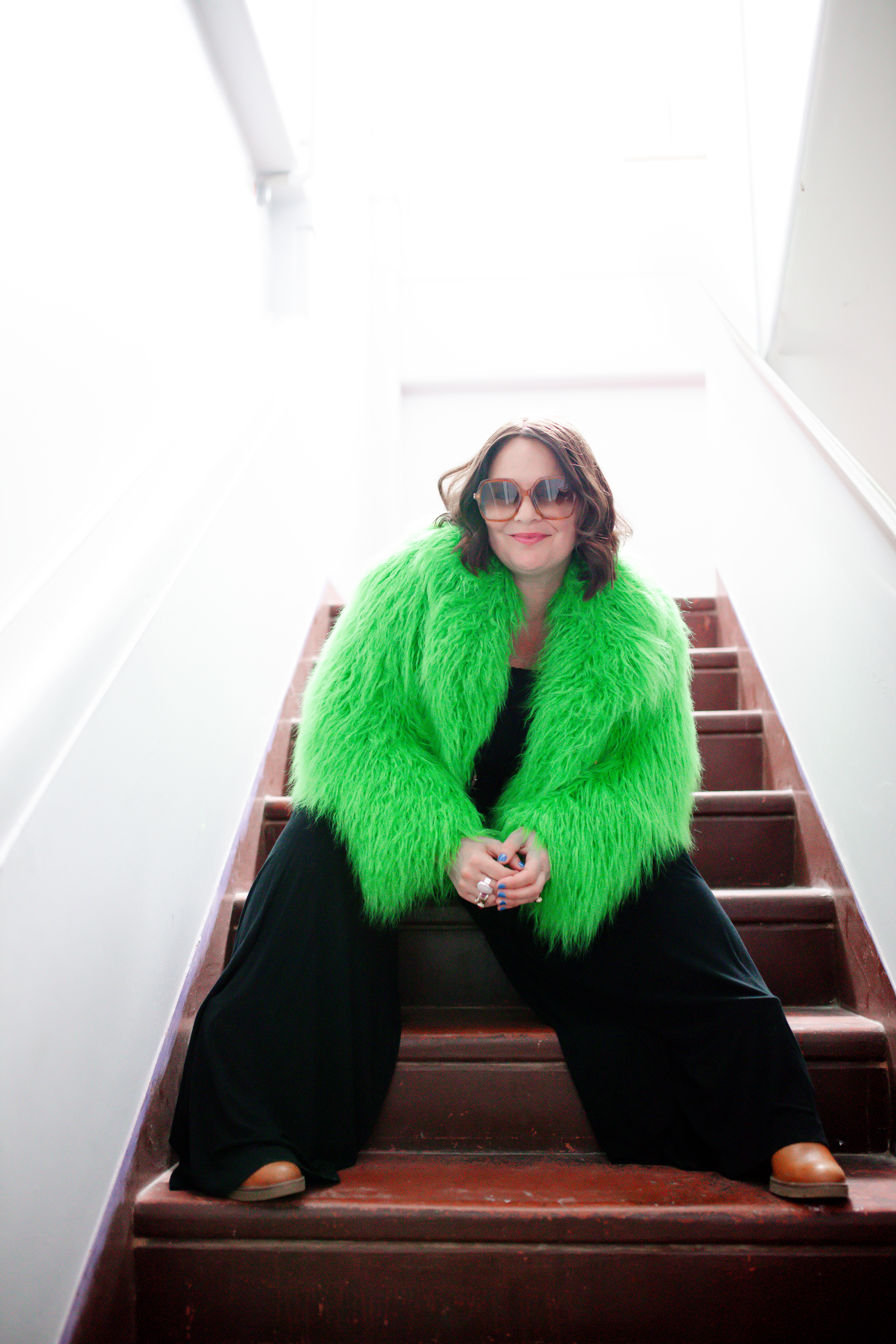
Jacqueline 'Rock' Bublitz

Jacqueline Bublitz (born 1977) is a New Zealand author. She won two Ngaio Marsh Awards in 2022 for her debut crime novel Before You Knew My Name. She was also the recipient of the 2022 Australian Book Industry Awards (ABIA) for General Fiction Book of the Year. She won two 2022 Davitt Awards, for Best Debut Crime and Reader's Choice, and was the only female to be shortlisted for the Gold Dagger Awards UK in 2022.

== Early life ==
Jacqueline Bublitz was born to John and Jo Bublitz and is the youngest of five children who were raised in Waitara, New Zealand. She attended New Plymouth Girls High School and was an exchange student with AFS in 1993. She is called "Rocky" by friends and close acquaintances, which is an abbreviation of her middle name Rochelle. She moved to Melbourne at 18 years of age and remained in Melbourne for over 20 years, with regular travel back to New Zealand. It was during this time living in Melbourne that she began to write.

== Career ==
Bublitz moved from working full-time, reducing her working hours in 2012 to enable her to write and finish her first novel.

In 2015, she moved to New York, the city which inspired her award-winning book Before You Knew My Name. After her father's death, and after 20 years in Melbourne, she moved home to New Plymouth, New Zealand to be closer to family.

By 2018 Bublitz was writing regularly. She had completed her first novel, and had submitted that, unsuccessfully, to a number of agents. By early 2020 she had a completed manuscript of Before You Knew My Name. She had sent several chapters to literary agents, and she found herself in a bidding war. Bublitz signed with Jonathan Clowes. Before you knew my name sold over 185k copies in Australia and New Zealand alone.

Since 2021 Bublitz has been writing full time. In October 2024 she had her second novel published Leave The Girls Behind.

Her agent is Cara Lee Simpson at SLA
