= Kirsten McDougall =

New Zealand author (born 1974)

- Born: 1974 (age 50–51)
- Occupation: Novelist; creative writing lecturer
- Education: MA (creative writing), Victoria University of Wellington (2004)
- Notable works: She's a Killer (2021)

Kirsten McDougall (born 1974) is a New Zealand novelist, short story writer and creative writing lecturer. She has published three novels, and won the 2021 Sunday Star-Times short story competition.

== Career ==
McDougall was born in 1974, and grew up in Wellington and Masterton. She obtained a Masters in Creative Writing from the International Institute of Modern Letters at Victoria University of Wellington in 2004. She teaches a long-form fiction course at Victoria, and until February 2022 she was the publicity manager at Te Herenga Waka University Press.

Her first book, The Invisible Rider, was a short-story collection published in 2012. The New Zealand Listener selected it as one of the top fiction books of the year. It was followed by the novel Tess in 2017, which was longlisted for the Ockham New Zealand Book Awards and shortlisted for the Ngaio Marsh Awards. Her work has also been published in magazines and anthologies, including Monsters in the Garden: an anthology of Aotearoa New Zealand science fiction and fantasy (2020), Landfall and Sport. In 2011 she won a Unity Books short story competition with "Clean Hands Save Lives", which was published in a special edition of Sport. In 2013 she received the Creative New Zealand Louis Johnson New Writer's Bursary, and in 2019 she received a Michael King Writers Centre residency.

Her third book, She's a Killer, was published in 2021. It is a thriller set in a future New Zealand which has become a haven for wealthy refugees ("wealthugees") from climate change. Reviewer Caroline Barron for Stuff said it "demonstrates an advanced tightness of prose, plot, tension and pacing that flings the reader forward, proving McDougall to be a dextrous and talented writer who has really hit her stride". It was included on Stuff's list of "the best of the bestsellers" in December 2021, and was shortlisted for the 2022 Ngaio Marsh Awards. Philip Matthews called it a "lively, engaging and often hilarious satirical novel", and praised McDougall's creation of a believable dystopian Wellington, "a world that slips easily between the entirely recognisable and the slightly strange". Kiran Dass for Newsroom said it "feels like a literary action thriller with flashes of confronting realism and perfectly placed comic timing". It was longlisted for the Ockham New Zealand Book Awards; it did not make the shortlist, despite reviewer Steve Braunias noting that it was one of "two novels everyone expected to be on it". Also in 2021, she won the Sunday Star-Times short story competition in the open category, with her short story "Walking Day".

In January 2023, She's a Killer was longlisted for the Dublin Literary Award. Shortly afterwards, it was reported that the novel would be published in the UK by Gallic Books in October 2023. In November 2023 it was included in The Guardian's list of recent best science fiction, fantasy and horror, and described as an "outrageous, comic, disturbingly timely novel". It was given 3/5 by The Telegraph, with the reviewer feeling it was "strenuously written", but praising the pace of the second half of the book and finale.

== Personal life ==
McDougall is married to musician David Long. As of 2021 they lived in Ōwhiro Bay, Wellington, with their two sons.

== Selected works ==
- The Invisible Rider (Victoria University Press, 2012)
- Tess (Victoria University Press, 2017)
- She's a Killer (Victoria University Press, 2021)
