= Vanda Symon =

New Zealand writer

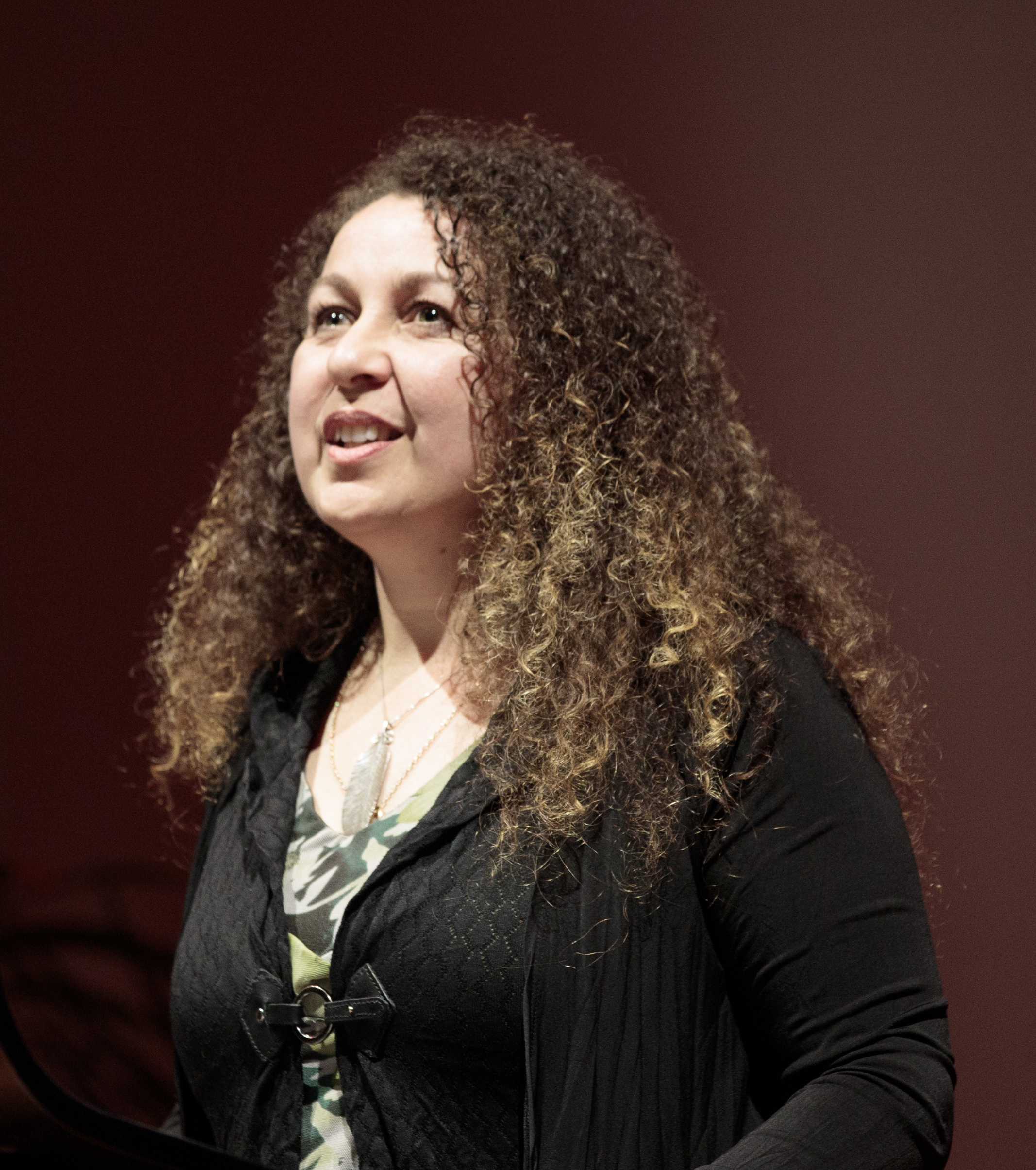
- Born: 1969 (age 56–57); Tauranga, Bay of Plenty, New Zealand
- Occupation: Writer
- Writing career
- Genre: Crime fiction
- Website: vandasymon.com

Vanda Symon (born 1969) is a crime writer and radio host from Dunedin, New Zealand, and the Chair of the Otago Southland Branch of the New Zealand Society of Authors. Three of her novels have been shortlisted for New Zealand's annual Ngaio Marsh Award for Best Crime Novel.

== Life ==
Born in Tauranga, she grew up there and then in Hawke's Bay. Symon calls herself "the product of a life-long love affair with books", having developed a strong love of reading at an early age. She has said her first books obsession was with the Berenstain Bears series of children's books – before she moved on to "camping out at the library" and a steady diet of Rosemary Sutcliff and TH White. The latter's The Sword in the Stone led her to a love of all things Camelot, a fascination with medieval times, and even choosing fencing as her sport.

After high school, Symon headed south to study pharmacy at the University of Otago in Dunedin. She practised as a pharmacist in the community and at the local hospice until 1999. She started a family in 2000, and began writing full-time while looking after her children in Hawke's Bay.

She returned to Dunedin in 2005 before her first novel was published.

Symon is a full-time mother and writer, and also produces and hosts a monthly books-focused radio show 'Write On' on Toroa Radio (It airs live on the second Wednesday of each month on Hills AM Community Radio 1575 kHz from noon to 1:00pm), serves as the Chair of the Otago Southland Branch of the New Zealand Society of Authors, and does monthly book reviews for Dunedin Diary on Channel 9 Television.

In 2018 Symon completed a PhD at the University of Otago, with a thesis on science in crime fiction. Her doctoral advisors were Natalie Medlicott, Susan Heydon, and Warwick Duncan.

== Writing ==
Symon's first novel, Overkill, was published in March 2007 in New Zealand by Penguin Books. It introduces series heroine Sam Shephard, and centres on the looks-like suicide death of a young mother in a small rural town in New Zealand. Symon told the Otago Daily Times that: “Overkill was 4 ½ years from go to whoa. This was very part time fitting in snippets of writing around babies and the associated demands of feeding, play, dealing with messes of all origins, household running and eyeballs-falling-out-of-head tiredness.”

Symon followed with the publication of her second novel The Ringmaster in August 2008. She has had some international success, with the German translation of Overkill, Ein Harmloser Mord, being published by Blanvalet in October 2008. Symon's third novel featuring Detective Sam Shephard, Containment, was published in November 2009, appeared on the New Zealand Adult Fiction Bestsellers List, and was on the shortlist for the inaugural Ngaio Marsh Award for Best Crime Novel.

A fourth novel in the Sam Shephard series, Bound, appeared in 2011. Bound was shortlisted for the Ngaio Marsh Award. Symon's fifth novel, a standalone thriller called The Faceless, was published in 2012. Set in Auckland, it too was shortlisted for the Ngaio Marsh Award.

== Radio ==
Symon's hosts Write On, the radio show of the Otago Southland branch of the New Zealand Society of Authors, broadcast on Toroa Radio 1575 kHz AM.

== Crime novels ==
Sam Shephard series

- 2007: Overkill.
- 2008: The Ringmaster.
- 2009: Containment.
- 2011: Bound.
- 2023: Expectant. London: Orenda Books.

Other

- 2012: The Faceless.
