= R. W. R. McDonald =

New Zealand author

R. W. R. McDonald is a New Zealand-born, Melbourne-based author of adult and children's fiction. He is best known for his crime novels The Nancys.(2019), Nancy Business(2021) and The Nancys and the Case of the Missing Necklace (2025), as well as the audio-first murder mystery An Ambush of Widows (2024). McDonald is also the author of children's picture books Happy Millionth Birthday (2023) and Rainbow Street (2025) His work has been internationally published in the United Kingdom and North America.

== Early life and education ==
McDonald was born in Balclutha, New Zealand and grew up on a sheep and venison farm in South Otago. The fictional town of Riverstone, which appears in The Nancys and Nancy Business, was named as an homage to River Heights, Nancy Drew's hometown, and is based on Balclutha in terms of its geography.

He lives in Melbourne, Australia. He is an openly queer father of two daughters, and has spoken publicly about LGBTQ+ representation in fiction.

== Career ==
McDonald's debut novel, The Nancys, was published by Allen & Unwin in 2019. The novel follows 11-year-old Tippy Chan as she forms a secret amateur detective club with her visiting uncle and his boyfriend. The book received critical acclaim and was awarded the 2020 Ngaio Marsh Award for Best First Novel.

In June 2021, the screen options for The Nancys were bought by Hoodlum Entertainment, via Grace Heifetz of Left Bank Literacy Agency.

The sequel, Nancy Business, was released in 2021, continuing the adventures of the same characters. It was shortlisted for the Best Novel category of the Ngaio Marsh Awards in 2022.

In 2023, McDonald published his first children's picture book, Happy Millionth Birthday, illustrated by Alexandra Columbo, by Larrikin House. A second picture book, Rainbow Street. illustrated by Kelly Canby, was published by Larrikin House in 2025. He has also written an audio-first murder mystery novel, An Ambush of Widows, published by Ulverscroft in 2024.

In 2025, McDonald signed with Orenda Books with The Nancys and the Case of the Missing Necklace, his first Nancys story, published in the UK 2025, with the North America release in 2026.

McDonald hosts the QWS Podcast, a spin-off series of the Words & Nerds podcast, featuring interviews with queer writers.

== Bibliography ==
=== Adult fiction ===
- The Nancys (2019) ISBN 9781760527334
- Nancy Business (2021) ISBN 9781760878870
- Dark Deeds Down Under: A Crime & Thriller Anthology (2022), Contributor “Nancys Undercover” ISBN 9780645316780
- An Ambush of Widows (2024, Ulverscroft), ISBN 9781399183680
- The Nancys and the Case of the Missing Necklace (2025, Orenda Books)

=== Children's books ===
- Happy Millionth Birthday (2023, Larrikin House) ISBN 9781922804631
- Rainbow Street (2025, Larrikin House), ISBN 9781923345171

== Awards and recognition ==
- Ngaio Marsh Award, 2020, Best First Novel, Winner for The Nancys
- Victorian Premier's Unpublished Manuscript Award, 2017 highly commended for The Nancys
- Ngaio Marsh Award, 2020, Best Crime Novel, finalist for The Nancys
- Ned Kelly Awards, 2020, Best First Novel, shortlisted for The Nancys
- Ngaio Marsh Award, 2022, Best Crime Novel, finalist for Nancy Business
