= J. P. Pomare =

Australian author

- Born: Joshua Pomare; 1988 (age 37–38); Rotorua, New Zealand
- Other name: J. P. Pomare
- Occupation: Author
- Years active: 2018–present

Joshua Pomare (born 1988) is a New Zealand author. He is known for his crime and thriller novels, including Call Me Evie (2018) and In the Clearing (2019), the latter of which was adapted into the Disney+ original series The Clearing.

== Career ==
Pomare's debut novel, Call Me Evie, was published in 2018, winning the Ngaio Marsh Award for Best First Novel. The manuscript had previously been longlisted for the KYD Unpublished Manuscript award.

In the Clearing, Pomare's second novel, was an Australian best-seller. Loosely based on the Australian cult The Family, the novel was adapted into a Disney+ original series, The Clearing, in 2023. The series was nominated for Best Miniseries at the 2024 AACTA Awards.

Pomare continued releasing a new novel yearly throughout the first half of the 2020s, including the top-ten bestseller The Wrong Woman (2023), the first of Pomare's books to feature recurring protagonist PI Vince Reid, and The Last Guests (2021), later adapted into the Stan original series Watching You.

In 2025, Pomare's novel 17 Years Later was shortlisted for the Ned Kelley Award for Best Crime Fiction, and became his third novel to be nominated for the Ngaio Marsh Award for Best Novel. It introduced the protagnist Sloane Abbott, who would later reappear in Pomare's 2027 novel The Good Son.

Pomare formerly hosted the literary podcast On Writing, and now co-hosts the podcast He Read She Read with fellow Melbourne-based author Sarah Bailey.

== Personal life ==
Pomare was raised on a horse-racing farm in rural New Zealand, later moving to Melbourne, Australia, where he currently resides with his wife.

His father, Bill, was a part-owner of Auckland Cup winning gelding Ocean Billy.

== Awards ==
Year	Work	Award	Category	Result	Ref
2019	Call Me Evie	Ngaio Marsh Award	Best First Novel	Won	
2019	Call Me Evie	Ngaio Marsh Award	Best Novel	Shortlisted	
2019	Call Me Evie	Ned Kelley Award	Best First Fiction	Longlisted	
2020	Call Me Evie	ABIA	Matt Richell Award	Shortlisted	
2020	Call Me Evie	ABIA	General Fiction Book of the Year	Longlisted	
2020	In The Clearing	Ngaio Marsh Award	Best Novel	Finalist	
2025	17 Years Later	Ned Kelley Award	Best Crime Fiction	Shortlisted	
2025	17 Years Later	Ngaio Marsh Award	Best Novel	Shortlisted	

== Bibliography ==
=== Novels ===
- Call Me Evie (2018)
- In The Clearing (2019)
- Tell Me Lies (2020)
- The Last Guests (2021)
- The Wrong Woman (2022)
- Home Before Night (2023)
- 17 Years Later (2024)
- The Gambler (2026)
- The Good Son (2027)
