= Paul Cleave =

New Zealand writer

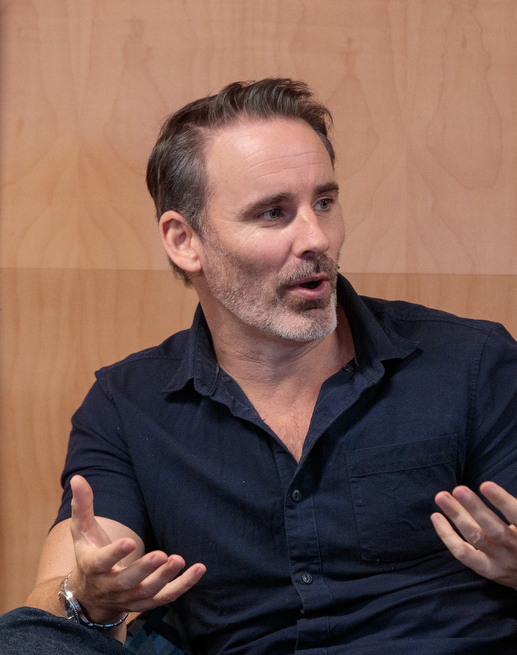
- Paul Cleave at WORD Christchurch 2018
- Writing career
- Genre: Crime fiction

Paul Cleave (born 10 December 1974) is a crime fiction author from New Zealand.

== Life ==
Cleave is an internationally bestselling author who is currently dividing his time between his home city of Christchurch, New Zealand, where all of his novels are set, and Europe. His work has been translated into 18 languages. He has won the Ngaio Marsh Award for best crime novel in New Zealand three times, he won the Saint-Maur book festival's crime novel of the year in France, has been shortlisted for the Edgar Award and the Barry Award in the US, and shortlisted for the Ned Kelly Award in Australia.

== Writing ==
Cleave's first published novel, The Cleaner, was released by Random House in 2006 and was listed as the top-selling crime/thriller title for 2007 on Amazon in Germany. It was also shortlisted for the Ned Kelly Awards for Crime Writing. The Cleaner was subsequently adapted into a television series called Dark City: The Cleaner by producers John Barnett and Chloe Smith. Cohen Holloway and Chelsie Florence starred as the two main leads. The series was funded by Lionsgate, the New Zealand Film Commission, NZ On Air, Sky Television and ChristchurchNZ's Screen CanterburyNZ fund. Filming for the series took place in Christchurch in 2023. The series debuted on 4 March 2024 on Neon, Sky Go and SoHo.

In September 2009, Cleave's novel Cemetery Lake was published in the United Kingdom by Arrow Books. When talking about setting his books in Christchurch in an article in Crime Time magazine, Cleave said: "Christchurch is a great setting for crime – it has two sides to it, there's the picture perfect setting you see on postcards everywhere, but there's also a dark, Gotham City feel here which has, sadly, turned this city into the murder capital of New Zealand. I love making Christchurch a character for the books, creating an 'alternate' version of the city, where the main character often muses that 'Christchurch is broken'."

His fourth novel, Blood Men, was released in February 2010. Cleave won the 2010 Ngaio Marsh Best Crime Novel Award for Blood Men.

His fifth novel, entitled Collecting Cooper (2011), is also set in Christchurch and sees the return of Theodore Tate, who was introduced in Cemetery Lake. It was shortlisted for the 2011 Ngaio Marsh Best Crime Novel Award.

His sixth novel, The Laughterhouse (2012), is the third novel in the Theodore Tate quartet. It was shortlisted for the 2012 Ngaio Marsh Awards.

His seventh novel, Joe Victim (2013), is a sequel to The Cleaner and was shortlisted for the 2014 Edgar Allan Poe Awards.

His eighth novel, Five Minutes Alone (2014), is the fourth book in the Theodore Tate quartet. It won the 2014 Ngaio Marsh Award for Best Crime Fiction.

Trust No One is a stand-alone novel featuring a retired crime writer, Jerry Grey, who has developed Alzheimers. He confesses to crimes that he wrote about - but the lines between what happened in his books and what is happening start to blur.

A Killer Harvest follows the story of Joshua who receives an eye transplant after his fathers dies. He has been blind from birth but due to a medical mishap, he receives two different eyes, and learns about a thing call cellular memory. He can see images and memories from two different people: his father and a killer.

== Bibliography ==
=== Joe Middleton novels ===
The books focus on Joe Middleton, a serial killer who works as a janitor for the Christchurch police department.

- 2006: The Cleaner
- 2013: Joe Victim

=== Theodore Tate novels ===
The books focus on Theodore Tate, a former cop turned private investigator based in Christchurch.

- 2008: Cemetery Lake
- 2011: Collecting Cooper
- 2012: The Laughterhouse
- 2014: Five Minutes Alone
- 2022: The Pain Tourist

=== Standalone novels ===
- 2007: The Killing Hour
- 2010: Blood Men
- 2015: Trust No One
- 2017: A Killer Harvest
- 2019: Whatever It Takes
- 2021: The Quiet People
- 2023: His Favourite Graves

== Reviews ==
"Most people come back from New Zealand talking about the breathtaking scenery and the amazing experiences. I came back raving about Paul Cleave. These are stories that you won’t forget in a while: relentlessly gripping, deliciously twisted and shot through with a vein of humour that’s as dark as hell. Cleave creates fictional monsters as chilling and as charming as any I’ve ever come across. Anyone who likes their crime fiction on the black and bloody side should move Paul Cleave straight to the top of their must-read list." Mark Billingham, award-winning crime writer

"...an eccentric, intriguing and rather gory story." – Alison Pressley, Good Reading

"Cleave also has an excellent ability to keep the surprises coming as the book unfolds, and at the same time has carefully and cleverly mapped out the journey of a criminally insane mind unravelling." – Lucy Clark, Sunday Telegraph

"Paul Cleave... is a talent to watch" – The Courier-Mail

"It's an exceptional debut by young New Zealand writer Paul Cleave whose concept of telling a story from a mass murderer's viewpoint is compelling." – Ray Chesterton, Saturday Daily Telegraph

"Cleave's writing is uncompromising, unpredictable, and enthralling... Made me vomit – seriously, it's that good" – Jack Heath, author, THE LAB

"...an impressive novel from a talented writer..." Craig Sisterson, Good Reading

"If ever a debut novel deserved the description of 'a tour de force', THE CLEANER by New Zealander Paul Cleave is it.", Denise Pickles, Mary Martin Books, Australia.
