= Raynor Johnson =

British physicist

Raynor Carey Johnson (5 April 1901 – 15 May 1987) was an English-born Australian parapsychologist, physicist and author.

== Life and career ==
Johnson was born in Leeds, England on 5 April 1901 and educated at Bradford Grammar School. He earned an MA at the University of Oxford and, in 1922, a PhD in physics at the University of London. He lectured in natural philosophy at the Queen's University, Belfast between 1923 and 1927. He published scientific works on spectroscopy.

He became increasingly interested in parapsychology and became connected with the Society for Psychical Research in London.

Johnson's religious background led to work in Australia, where he was master of the Methodist Queen's College at the University of Melbourne from 1934 to 1964. By this time he was married with two young daughters; his wife Mary held a Master of Science from the University of London.

Johnson published several books on mysticism and psychical research during the 1950s and 1960s. His beliefs and writings eventually created concern within the Methodist Church and he retired from his university position in 1964. In the early 1960s Johnson visited India, where he met Sarvepalli Radhakrishnan and lectured on spirituality. He also met the Indian mystics Vinoba Bhave and Swami Pratyagatmananda.

Johnson was an advocate of Douglas Fawcett's philosophy of Imaginism which he believed could explain God and the purpose of human life.

He owned a property called "Santiniketan" ("abode of peace") at Ferny Creek in the Dandenong Ranges outside Melbourne. There he hosted regular meetings of a religious and philosophical discussion group led by the yoga teacher Anne Hamilton-Byrne. This group became known as "The Family", a cult that adopted a large number of children and treated them cruelly until Victoria police rescued them on 14 August 1987. Hamilton-Byrne and her husband Bill were extradited from the United States six years later and faced criminal charges.

Twenty years after his death, an authorised biography was published, Raynor Johnson – A Biographical Memoir (2007). Two further books authored by Johnson were published after his death – Mysticism and Life (2010) and a collection of miscellaneous writings, A Late Lark Singing (2012).

== Reception ==
In his book Psychical Research, Johnson endorsed psychical and spiritualist phenomena and cited reports by the Society for Psychical Research. In a review for The Quarterly Review of Biology M. Steinbach wrote that although Johnson was "quite earnest and certainly sincere in completely accepting the whole range of spiritualist phenomena", many of the cases he described could be easily explained by coincidence, delusion, hallucination, suggestion and that most of the mediums were exposed as fraudulent. Johnson believed that the material world was a creation of the mind, and claimed paranormal phenomena such as discarnate minds, mediumship, psi and telepathy could be explained by a "psychic ether". On this, Steinbach wrote "but to do that is to leave this world of reality and the firm basis of scientific thought for a speculative journey in an imaginary vehicle to a never-never-land."

Johnson's Nurslings of Immortality received a mixed review in The Journal of Religion, wherein William Hamilton wrote that the book endorsed a "pretentious philosophical quasi-idealism" called Imaginism but contained some interesting material about automatic writing and psychic phenomena.

== Publications ==
- Spectra. 1928 (Methuen: London)
- Atomic Spectra. 1946 (Methuen: London)
- An introduction to Molecular Spectra. 1949 (Methuen: London)
- The Imprisoned Splendour. An approach to reality, based upon the significance of data drawn from the fields of natural science, psychical research and mystical experience. 1953 (Hodder & Stoughton: London); new edition 1989 (Pelegrin Trust in association with Pilgrim Books: Tasburgh, Norwich) ISBN 0-946259-30-5
- Psychical Research. 1955 (English Universities Press: London)
- Nurslings of Immortality. 1957 (Hodder & Stoughton: London); new edition 1989 (Pelegrin Trust in association with Pilgrim Books: Tasburgh, Norwich) ISBN 0-946259-43-7
- Watcher on the Hills. 1959 (Hodder & Stoughton: London); new edition 1988 (Pelegrin Trust in association with Pilgrim Books: Tasburgh, Norwich) ISBN 0-946259-28-3
- A Religious Outlook for Modern Man. 1963. (Hodder & Stoughton: London); new edition 1988 (Pelegrin Trust in association with Pilgrim Books: Tasburgh, Norwich) ISBN 0-946259-27-5
- The Light and the Gate. 1964 (Hodder & Stoughton: London) ISBN 0-340-01214-5
- The Spiritual Path. 1972 (Hodder & Stoughton: London) ISBN 0-340-15852-2
- A Pool of Reflections: for the refreshment of travellers on the spiritual path. 1975 (Hodder & Stoughton: London) ISBN 0-340-19247-X
- Light of All Life: Thoughts towards a philosophy of life. 1984 (Pilgrim Books: Tasburgh, Norwich) ISBN 0-946259-07-0
- Mysticism and Life. 2010 (Lakeland Publications: Melbourne) ISBN 978-0-9804078-1-5
- A Late Lark Singing. 2012 (Lakeland Publications: Melbourne) ISBN 978-0-9804078-3-9
