= Watching You (TV series) =

- Genre: Erotic thriller
- Created by: Alexei Mizin; Ryan van Dijk
- Based on: The Last Guests by J. P. Pomare
- Written by: Alexei Mizin; Ryan van Dijk
- Directed by: Peter Salmon; Sian Davies
- Starring: Aisha Dee; Josh Helman; Chai Hansen
- Country of origin: Australia
- Original language: English

Production
- Executive producer: Helen Bowden
- Producers: Jason Stephens; Bree-Anne Sykes
- Production company: Lingo Pictures

Original release
- Network: Stan
- Release: 3 October 2025

Watching You is an Australian erotic thriller miniseries that premiered on Stan on 3 October 2025. The series is adapted from J. P. Pomare's novel The Last Guests. It follows Lina, who discovers that her passionate one night stand has been captured by hidden cameras.

== Cast ==
- Aisha Dee as Lina
- Laura Gordon as Clare
- Chai Hansen as Cain
- Luke Cook as Axel
- Josh Helman as Dan
- Olivia Vasquez as Tess
- Sara Wiseman as Brennan
- Mark Paguio
- Willow Speers
- Benjamin Wang

== Production ==
On 12 March 2024, Stan announced they were creating 25 new tv shows including one named Watching You based on the novel The Last Guests by J.P. Pomare.

On 18 February 2025, Stan announced 14 major commissions as part of the network's 10-year celebrations. The series at the event was announced with Aisha Dee in the lead role and production being undertaken by Lingo Pictures.

It is a six-part series. On 11 September 2025, Stan released the trailer for the series.

== Release and reception ==
Watching You premiered on Stan on 3 October 2025.

Luke Buckmaster of The Guardian gave the series 2 out of 5 stars, but praised Dee's performance, writing "this series feels low-stakes and slow-paced in comparison – despite a haunting performance from Aisha Dee".

== Episodes ==
| No. | Title | Plot | Directed by | Written by | Original release date |
|---|---|---|---|---|---|
| 1 | "Episode 1" | Lina's impulsive encounter with a stranger becomes a terrifying trap when she discovers her secret is about to be exposed. | Peter Salmon | Alexei Mizin & Ryan Van Dijk | 3 October 2025 |
| 2 | "Episode 2" | Lina races against the clock to uncover the voyeur, and is shocked to learn that they may be closer than she imagined. | Peter Salmon | Alexei Mizin & Ryan Van Dijk | 3 October 2025 |
| 3 | "Episode 3" | After suffering a devastating loss, Lina believes someone close to her may be hiding sinister secrets. | Peter Salmon | Alexei Mizin & Ryan Van Dijk | 3 October 2025 |
| 4 | "Episode 4" | Months pass and Lina's new romance blooms, until a chance meeting shows her old wounds aren't fully healed. | Sian Davies | Alexei Mizin & Ryan Van Dijk | 3 October 2025 |
| 5 | "Episode 5" | Lina faces the consequences of uncovering the truth and finds herself in an intense psychological mind game with life and death stakes. | Sian Davies | Alexei Mizin & Ryan Van Dijk | 3 October 2025 |
| 6 | "Episode 6" | With her life in ashes, Lina closes in on the insidious voyeur responsible for all her suffering, intent on bringing them to justice no matter the cost. | Sian Davies | Alexei Mizin & Ryan Van Dijk | 3 October 2025 |
