= Fiona Sussman =

New Zealand writer (born 1965)

- Born: 1965 (age 60–61); Johannesburg, South Africa
- Education: Auckland University of Technology (MA, 2009)
- Occupations: Novelist, short story writer and doctor
- Website: Official website

Fiona Stewart Sussman (born 1965) is a New Zealand novelist, short story writer and doctor. Born in Johannesburg, South Africa, she moved to New Zealand in 1989 where she completed her medical degree and went on to work as a general practitioner until becoming a full-time writer in 2003. She has published a number of award-winning novels since 2014. She has also won awards for her short stories, including the Sunday Star-Times Short Story Award in 2018.

== Early life and medical career ==
Sussman was born in Johannesburg. Her father worked as a publisher at Heinemann; she began writing at an early age but chose to study medicine after his death from stomach cancer. She obtained a Bachelor of Arts from the University of the Witwatersrand in 1986 and began her medical degree; while studying she was part of a group of medical students who refused to work in segregated whites-only hospitals. After meeting her husband, a fellow medical student, they emigrated to New Zealand in 1989. She received a bachelor of medicine and surgery from the University of Auckland in 1993.

Sussman worked as a general practitioner, and together with her husband founded the Aotearoa Charity Hospital in Auckland in 2008. As of 2023 she continues to be a trustee of the hospital, which provides free surgery to patients who cannot obtain it through the public health system.

== Writing career ==
In 2003 Sussman became a full-time writer, and in 2009 she obtained a master's degree in creative writing from the Auckland University of Technology. During her master's she wrote the novel Sentenced, which won the 2014 Kobo/NZ Author Publishing Prize. This was an early draft for what would become her second novel, The Last Time We Spoke.

Her short stories have been broadcast on RNZ National and published in New Zealand literary journals such as takahē. In 2012 she won the Graeme Lay Short Story Competition with "The Gift" and was runner-up in the Royal College of New Zealand Manhire Prize for Creative Science Writing with "Black Toes". In 2018 she won the Sunday Star-Times Short Story Award with "Mad Men". In April 2020, her short story "A Breath, A Bunk, A Land, A Sky" was shortlisted for the Commonwealth Short Story Prize.

Her debut novel, Shifting Colours (2014), was published in the United Kingdom by Allison & Busby and in the United States under the title Another Woman's Daughter by Berkley Books. It was set partly in South Africa and dealt with issues of cross-country adoption and cultural identity. Sussman wrote the novel over ten years, and describes the novel as being inspired by her own experiences growing up under the apartheid system.

Sussman's second novel, The Last Time We Spoke (Allison & Busby, 2016), covered a home invasion and its aftermath. The novel won the Ngaio Marsh Award for Best Crime Novel in 2017 and was shortlisted for the NZSA New Zealand Heritage Book Award in 2016. The Otago Daily Times called it a "a hard-hitting, emotion-packed novel featuring injustice and racial prejudice", and included it on a list of the best books of 2016. As a result of this novel she was invited to the Bloody Scotland writing festival in Stirling, Scotland.

Her third novel Addressed to Greta (2020) won the NZ Booklovers' Best Adult Fiction Prize, and her fourth novel The Doctor's Wife (2022) was named one of the best 100 books of 2022 by the New Zealand Listener. The Doctor's Wife was shortlisted for the NZ Booklovers Award 2023, and was a finalist for the Ngaio Marsh Award for Best Crime Novel 2023. The Doctor's Wife was Auckland Council Libraries most borrowed book in 2023. Sussman noted that The Doctor's Wife is her first novel to include a medical background, and said "it was quite fun and satisfying to tie together my two disparate professions".

Sussman's fifth novel Hooked Up (2025) is the second in the Bandara/Stark series. It has been longlisted for the Ngaio Marsh Best Crime Novel for 2026.

== Selected works ==
=== Novels ===
- Shifting Colours (Allison & Busby, UK, 2014), also published as Another Woman's Daughter (Berkley Books, US, 2014)
- The Last Time We Spoke (Allison & Busby, UK, 2016). Also translated into Polish: Ostatni Raz, Gdy Rozmawialismy (Wydawnictwo Kobiece Lukasz Kierus, Poland, 2018)
- Addressed to Greta (Bateman Books, 2020)
- The Doctor's Wife (Bateman Books, 2022), also published as In Sickness and in Health (Legend Press, UK, 2024) and as La Femme du Médecin ( Méra Editions, France, 2026)
- Hooked Up (BatemanBooks, 2025)

=== Short stories ===
- "A Very Important Date" (2008)
- "The Oath" (2009)
- "The Bottom Line" (2011)
- "The Gift" (2012)
- "Roading" (2012)
- "Black Toes" (2013)
- "The Fall" (2016)
- "Mad Men" (2018)
- "A Breath, A Bunk, A Land, A Sky" (2020)
