= Charity Norman =

Fiction writer

Charity Norman is a crime and psychological drama author who lives in New Zealand. She has published eight novels with publishing house Allen & Unwin and was the winner of the 2023 Ngaio Marsh Award for her book Remember Me.

== Early life ==
Norman was born in Uganda, where her father ran a theological college. She is the youngest of the seven children of Bill and Beryl Norman. When Norman was a baby, the family returned to Britain. She spent her childhood growing up in Yorkshire vicarages and later in inner-city Birmingham.

== Career ==
Norman worked for 15 years as a barrister specialising in criminal and family law. She was the third female barrister to work at her York chambers. She has said that her experiences in the court systems shape her work as a writer.

Norman gave up her legal career and moved to New Zealand in 2002. Norman's first book was not published until 2010, eight years after she began writing full time.

Norman is patron of the Between the Lines Central Hawkes Bay Literary Festival. She is a public speaker, and runs creative writing workshops.

== Personal life ==
Norman met Tim Meredith, a New Zealander, in the Sahara Desert on an overland lorry. They spent many years travelling, before settling back in Yorkshire. They married and had three children. Norman moved to Waipukurau, New Zealand, her husband's hometown, in 2002. Norman's mother, Beryl, died in 2016 after a drawn-out battle with Alzheimer's disease. While organising her deceased mother's bedroom, Norman developed the idea for her sixth book, Remember Me, which explores a journey with Alzheimer's disease. Norman is a distant cousin of Virginia Woolf through their shared connection to Victorian photographer Julia Margaret Cameron.

== List of works ==
=== Novels ===
- Freeing Grace (2010): Norman's first book explores family and adoption. Set in the UK and Africa.
- After the Fall aka Second Chances (2012): After the Fall, known as Second Chances in Australia and New Zealand, explores family drama and moral dilemma. It is set in New Zealand, about a family of recent émigrées from Britain. The novel was chosen for the Richard and Judy Book Club 2012 and World Book Night 2012.
- The Son-in-Law (2013): The Son-in-Law is a family drama set in Britain. After a father does something unforgivable, he serves time in prison and seeks to reconnect with his children.
- The New Woman aka The Secret Life of Luke Livingstone (2015): The New Woman explores the transgender journey of Lucia Livingstone, acknowledging the complexity and feelings of Lucia's family, wife and children, as they struggle to understand. The novel was a BBC Radio 2 Book Club pick 2015.
- See You in September (2016): See you in September is set in New Zealand, where a young British backpacker finds herself entrenched in a cult. The book follows both her experience within the cult, and the challenges faced by her family on the outside. The novel was a finalist in the Ngaio Marsh Awards 2018. It won the NZ Listener Book of the Year 2017 and was the UK Reading Agency Book of the Year 2017.
- The Secrets of Strangers (2020): This novel is set in a London café, where a man shoots the café owner and the characters are plunged into a hostage situation. The novel was a BBC Radio 2 Book Club pick 2020, shortlisted for the Ngaio Marsh Awards 2021 and shortlisted for the Ned Kelly Awards 2021 (Best International Crime Fiction).
- Remember Me (2022): Remember Me takes place in the New Zealand countryside. It explores a man's deterioration into Alzheimer's disease, and the secrets he reveals as his mind begins to slip. It won the Ngaio Marsh Awards 2023 (Best Novel).
- Home Truths (2024): Home Truths follows the journey of Scott, triggered by the COVID-19 pandemic, as he loses his grip on truth, and of his wife Livia who is on trial two years later for attempted murder. The novel was a finalist in the Ngaio Marsh Awards 2025, shortlisted in the Ned Kelly Awards 2025 and one of The Listener's Top 100 Books of 2024.

=== Short stories ===
Norman has published two short stories including "Best Served Cold", a spin-off involving characters from See You in September, and a short murder mystery included in Dark Deeds Down Under 2 edited by Craig Sisterson.

== Awards ==
Remember Me won the Ngaio Marsh Awards 2023 Best Crime Novel award.
