= Ben Sanders (author) =

New Zealand writer

- Born: 1989 (age 36–37); Auckland
- Writing career
- Genres: Crime, Mystery
- Website: www.ben-sanders.com

Ben Sanders (born 1989) is a bestselling crime writer from Auckland, New Zealand. His work has received critical acclaim, been shortlisted for the Ngaio Marsh Award, and his fourth novel, American Blood, has been optioned for film adaptation by Warner Bros, with four-time Oscar nominee Bradley Cooper slated to play the lead role.

== Life ==
Sanders was born and raised on the North Shore of the city of Auckland, New Zealand. He wanted to be a writer from when he was a young child.

Sanders was a keen reader as a child, and particularly enjoyed crime and thriller fiction. He read the Day of the Jackal while in middle school, and was hooked. His favourite authors as a young reader were Lee Child, Michael Connelly, Peter Dexter, and James Ellroy. He tried writing his own crime novel, set in the United States, as a teenager.

After writing two unpublished crime novels as a high school student, Sanders secured a two-book deal with HarperCollins that saw his debut novel The Fallen published in 2010 when he was a 20-year-old engineering student at the University of Auckland.

== The Auckland Trilogy ==
The Fallen introduced Sean Devereaux, an Auckland police detective, and John Hale, a security specialist and ex-colleague. Sanders' story of kidnapping, murder, and police corruption became a #1 New Zealand fiction bestseller, staying atop the bestseller charts for several weeks. The book received widespread critical acclaim, including being named on the New Zealand Listener's prestigious 100 Best Books list, and was later longlisted for the 2011 Ngaio Marsh Award.

Sanders followed up The Fallen with two further Auckland-set novels starring Devereaux and Hale: By Any Means (Harpercollins, 2011) and Only the Dead (Harpercollins, 2013). Both were New Zealand fiction bestsellers, and By Any Means was a finalist for the 2012 Ngaio Marsh Award. The international judging panel for the Ngaio Marsh Award called By Any Means a “real page turner” and Sanders “a master of the short sentence and crisp dialogue”, reminiscent of Elmore Leonard.

Sanders' first three published novels - the Auckland Trilogy - were all written while he was studying civil engineering at the University of Auckland; he later graduated with a Bachelor of Engineering with First Class Honours and was named on the Dean's Honours List.

== American Blood ==
Following the critical and commercial success of his Auckland trilogy, Sanders was signed to a two-book contract by New York publishers Macmillan after he visited the United States on a Bellingham Wallace Emerging Talent Award in mid 2013. Macmillan wanted Sanders to set his new novels in the United States rather than New Zealand. American Blood was Sanders’ American debut, and it launched a new crime series about Marshall Grade, an ex-NYPD officer turned mob informant, who is pulled into a dangerous investigation while living under the witness protection program in New Mexico. He has also published the novels Marshall’s Law (2017) and The Stakes (2018).

In February 2014, the film rights to American Blood were optioned by Warner Bros, following interest from other film studios and TV companies, with four-time Oscar nominee Bradley Cooper tabbed to produce and star in the lead role.

American Blood was scheduled to be published in November 2015. Translation rights have already been sold to publishers in Germany, Russia and Japan.

== Bibliography ==
1. The Stakes (2018)
2. The Devils You Know (2021)

=== The Auckland Trilogy ===
1. The Fallen (2010)
2. By Any Means (2011)
3. Only the Dead (2013)

=== The Marshall Grade series ===
1. American Blood (2015)
2. Marshall's Law (2017)
3. Exit .45 (2021)

== Awards ==
In the early years of his career, Sanders earned a number of honours recognising his work in literature, the arts, and emerging talent.

- 2011 - Ngaio Marsh Award - longlisted for The Fallen
- 2012 - Bellingham Wallace Emerging Talent Award
- 2012 - Ngaio Marsh Award - finalist for By Any Means
- 2014 - AIMES Awards - winner of the Arts Award and the Sir Peter Blake Trophy (the Supreme Award)
- 2014 - Ngaio Marsh Award - longlisted for Only the Dead
- 2022 - Ngaio Marsh Award - finalist for The Devils You Know
- 2023 - Ngaio Marsh Award - finalist for Exit .45
