= Anne Hamilton-Byrne =

Australian cult leader and yoga teacher (1921–2019)

- Born: Evelyn Grace Victoria Edwards (1921–1959); 30 December 1921; Sale, Victoria
- Died: 13 June 2019 (aged 97); Melbourne, Victoria
- Occupation: Yogini
- Years active: 1960s—1990s
- Known for: The Family, a religious cult; Claim to be the reincarnation of Jesus
- Criminal charges: Fraud
- Criminal penalty: A$5,000 fine
- Criminal status: Penalty paid
- Spouses: Lionel Harris (m. 1941; died 1955); Michael Riley (sep. 1965); Bill Byrne (m. 1978; died 2001)
- Children: 1 (natural); c. 14 improperly registered incl. Sarah Moore

Anne Hamilton-Byrne (30 December 1921 – 13 June 2019) was an Australian cult leader and yoga teacher, who founded The Family.

== Biography ==
Born Evelyn Grace Victoria Edwards on 30 December 1921 in the Victorian town of Sale, she was the eldest of seven children in a working-class family. Her father, Ralph, a World War I veteran, was often absent, and her mother, Florence (née Hoile), a British-born woman who claimed to communicate with the dead, was intermittently hospitalized for mental health issues. Edwards spent part of her childhood in an orphanage.

In 1941, she married Lionel Harris and had one biological child, Judith, who later sued her mother and settled in Britain before predeceasing her. Following Lionel Harris's death in a car accident in 1955, Edwards experienced grief, to which she attributed her spiritual awakening. She changed her name to Anne Hamilton in 1959.

Hamilton-Byrne married Michael Riley, a South African naval officer, in 1965, but the marriage ended. She later partnered with Bill Byrne, a British-born businessman, and they married in 1978, and he died in 2001.

Hamilton-Byrne began adopting children in the late 1960s, some of whom were improperly registered as her own. These children were subjected to strict control, including uniform haircuts and disciplinary measures such as physical punishment and restricted diets. During adolescence, some children underwent initiation involving LSD.

Under her leadership, "The Family" developed a belief system that combined elements of Christianity and Eastern religions, anticipating an imminent apocalypse. Hamilton-Byrne claimed to be the reincarnation of Jesus Christ, attracting followers including physicist Raynor Johnson, who identified as the reincarnation of John the Baptist. By the 1970s, the cult had over 500 members and accumulated significant financial resources, which Hamilton-Byrne used for personal expenses, including plastic surgery.

In 1987, a member of the cult, Sarah, aged 17, left and reported the group to authorities, resulting in a police raid and the removal of six children. In 1993, Hamilton-Byrne was convicted of fraud for falsifying birth registrations and fined A$5,000. She was not prosecuted for child abuse due to concerns about the children's capacity to testify. Diagnosed with dementia, Hamilton-Byrne remained committed to her role within the cult until her death in 2019.
