= Paddy Richardson =

New Zealand writer

- Occupation: Writer

Paddy Richardson is a writer who lives in Dunedin, New Zealand. She has published two collections of short stories, Choices (Hard Echo Press, 1986) and If We Were Lebanese (Steele Roberts, 2003), and three novels, The Company of a Daughter (Steele Roberts, 2000), A Year to Learn A Woman (Penguin, 2008) and Hunting Blind (Penguin, 2010). Her work has appeared in journals, anthologies, and on radio, and has been highly commended in several writing competitions, including the Katherine Mansfield and Sunday Star Times Short Story Awards. She has been awarded the University of Otago Burns Fellowship, the Beatson fellowship and the University of Otago/James Wallace residency.

== Life ==
Richardson lives and writes in Broad Bay, a beach settlement on the Otago Peninsula. She wrote part of her second novel A Year to Learn A woman while living on the Kāpiti Coast after being awarded the $6000 lemon Foxton Fellowship, which included a month's residency in a cottage at Foxton Beach.

== Books ==
=== Novels ===
- The Company of A Daughter (Steele Roberts, 2000)
- A Year to Learn A Woman (Penguin Books, 2008)
- Hunting Blind (Penguin Books, 2010)
- Traces of Red (Penguin Books, 2011)
- Swimming in the Dark (Upstart Press, 2014)

=== Short story collections ===
- Choices (Hard Echo Press, 1986)
- If We Were Lebanese (Steel Roberts, 2003)
