= Sarah Moore (The Family) =

Australian writer and former member of a new religious movement

Sarah Moore, formerly known as Sarah Hamilton-Byrne (8 July 1969 – May 2016), was an Australian medical doctor and writer who spent her childhood in The Family, a new religious movement run by Anne Hamilton-Byrne, her adoptive mother. She was instrumental in having the group investigated by the police in Victoria, Australia. She later wrote a book about her experiences in The Family.

== Early life and education ==
Moore's biological mother was an unmarried teenager who put her daughter up for adoption in 1969. Moore was adopted by Anne Hamilton-Byrne, a charismatic yoga teacher who gathered a number of followers around her who believed that she was the incarnation of Christ. Moore was meant to be one of the "inheritors of the earth" after a holocaust took place. Hamilton-Byrne had many followers who worked in the medical and nursing professions, and who manipulated the adoption process so that 14 children were adopted by her. These children—including Moore—were told that Hamilton-Byrne was their biological mother.

Along with the other adopted children, Moore was brought up in houses that were owned by Hamilton-Byrne, who had several properties in various countries (Moore later estimated that Hamilton-Byrne might have been worth $150 million). Moore spent the first four to five years of her life at a house called "Winberra" in the Dandenong Ranges east of Melbourne, Victoria. After that, she was moved to "Kai Lama", a group house at Lake Eildon also in Victoria.

Life for the children at "Kai Lama" was unremittingly strict and even brutal. Hamilton-Byrne herself was usually not there, so the children were supervised by women from The Family who were known as "aunties". These women disciplined the children by inflicting severe beatings for the most trivial reasons or no reason at all. Another common disciplinary measure was food deprivation. The children lived in fear and were deprived of all love and affection. Despite this, they always hoped for some show of affection from Hamilton-Byrne, whom they believed to be their mother, and who visited "Kai Lama" from time to time. They were also led to believe that the world outside was an evil and dangerous place and that they would end up in the gutter or worse if they ever left The Family.

Another common form of discipline was the administration of prescription drugs that were obtained by the followers in the medical and nursing professions. These drugs were routinely used to pacify the children. When they were older, they could also be forced to take the hallucinogenic drug LSD as a kind of religious ritual. This was known as "going-through", and was supposed to promote self-awareness, helping the person to let go of blocks. Moore was forced to "go-through" in 1984, when she was 15. The experience took place at a property owned by The Family in England, and went on for some days because she was given repeated doses of the drug. She found it a traumatic experience and was later convinced that she had suffered lasting damage from the drug.

As Moore grew up, she became more assertive and began arguing with those who supervised the children, including Hamilton-Byrne herself. After arguing once too often, she was expelled from The Family in 1987, at the age of 17. She was then taken in by a family she had met. After a time, she was introduced to a private investigator, known only as "Helen D", who had been investigating The Family for several years. From Helen D, Moore learnt that Anne Hamilton-Byrne was a fraud and that she herself was not Hamilton-Byrne's daughter at all; she had in fact been adopted.

Helen D introduced Moore to two policewomen who won her confidence; this eventually led to a police raid on "Kai Lama" on 14 August 1987. A number of children were taken into custody, then placed in care, along with Moore. A number of the "aunties" faced criminal charges and were eventually convicted of fraudulently obtaining money from the Department of Social Security. In 1990, former group solicitor Peter Kibby started co-operating with police and confessed to forging birth records on orders from Hamilton-Byrne. Former auntie Patricia McFarlane gave information to police about adoption scams. Hamilton-Byrne and her husband Bill were overseas at the time; they were extradited from the United States in 1993 and faced criminal charges, but were only convicted of fraud in regard to the adoption of Moore and other children. They were each fined $5,000.

== Career ==
Moore wrote a book—Unseen Unheard Unknown—detailing her experiences in The Family; it was published by Penguin in 1995.

She went on to study medicine and became a qualified doctor, working at a number of Melbourne hospitals. As a doctor, she did extensive volunteer work in India and Thailand (where she worked with Karen refugees on the Thai–Burma border), but still returned to Australia, where she carried on a medical practice in the Dandenong Ranges.

=== Legal issues ===
Moore was charged with forging prescriptions of pethidine for herself. In July 2005, she avoided a jail sentence at Ringwood Magistrate's Court in Victoria. She was allowed to remain free as long as she maintained good behaviour for four years and did community service. She had pleaded guilty to forging prescriptions to obtain pethidine between November 2004 and April 2005. Moore was diagnosed with bipolar disorder and post-traumatic stress disorder.

Eventually, Moore set up a charity called Barefoot Basics, which aims to provide health assistance to indigenous and displaced people in countries like India. The charity was approved for tax deductible purposes. She did charity work overseas whenever she could afford to make the trip.

== Personal life ==
In December 2008, Moore was in hospital and lost her left leg as a result of what she considered to be mistreatment by hospital staff after a suicide attempt. She used a wheelchair for the rest of her life.

In August 2009, Moore had an emotional reunion with Hamilton-Byrne which was covered by the Herald Sun newspaper. Hamilton-Byrne, who was then 87 years old, said she was now "ready to die" after being reunited with her "favourite daughter". The reunion took place at Hamilton-Byrne's sprawling compound at Olinda, Victoria. Hamilton-Byrne said that people who accused her of mistreating the children were "lying bastards" and she would love to "put them right" but could not. She stated that she could have sued her critics but had decided against it. Moore said that she loved Hamilton-Byrne but had mixed feelings about her, still regarded her as being responsible for the abuse of the children. Hamilton-Byrne blamed the Aunties. That was as far as Hamilton-Byrne would go in acknowledging any wrongdoing, Moore said; otherwise she was unrepentant.

She described Hamilton-Byrne as a powerful and charismatic person and thought that she initially meant well in creating the cult and collecting the children. These acts, she thought, were Hamilton-Byrne's compensation and "delusional repair" for her own childhood, marred by an absent father and a psychotic mother. In a 2009 blog post, Moore said that she had decided to see Hamilton-Byrne again after going through a form of therapy called the Hoffman Quadrinity Process, after which she thought it was important to forgive.

Moore became a Buddhist in 2009 after meeting a Buddhist lama who inducted her into the belief system of Buddhism. She said this brought her enormous relief and joy and meant that she was now rid of her burden. She felt she now had the support of a teacher/guru (the Buddha), the Dharma (a word usually translated as "righteousness", and denoting the righteous or spiritual path) and the community of Buddhists. This new belief system made sense of her life and gave her a perspective on things, particularly where she had gone wrong by taking on too much, spiritually and emotionally. Having found a guru in whom no one could find fault, she felt that she had regained the psychological and spiritual support that she had lacked ever since her expulsion from The Family.

Moore died in May 2016, aged 46, of heart failure. At her Buddhist-themed funeral, fellow survivors from The Family spoke on her behalf.
