= Finn Bell =

English footballer

Fin Bell
Personal information
- Full name: Finley Harrison Bell
- Date of birth: 2004 (age 21–22)
- Place of birth: Dudley, England
- Position: Midfielder

Team information
- Current team: Cirencester Town

Youth career
- –2020: Forest Green Rovers

Senior career*
Years	Team	Apps	(Gls)
2020–2024	Forest Green Rovers	0	(0)
2022–2023	→ Cinderford Town (loan)	19	(2)
2023–2024	→ Yate Town (loan)	23	(1)
2024–2025	Cirencester Town		
2025–	Cirencester Town		
2025	→ Gloucester City (dual-registration)	1	(0)
- * Club domestic league appearances and goals as of 20:49, 21 October 2025 (UTC)

Finley Harrison Bell is an English professional footballer who plays as a midfielder for Cirencester Town.

== Career ==
Bell made his first-team debut for Forest Green Rovers in the EFL Trophy on 6 October 2020, coming on as an 83rd-minute substitute for Josh March in a 3–0 win over West Bromwich Albion U21 at The New Lawn.

In October 2023, he joined Southern League Division One South club Yate Town on an initial 28-day loan deal.

In February 2025, Bell departed for the United States in order to take up a scholarship.

In August 2025, having returned to Cirencester Town, Bell joined Gloucester City on dual-registration terms.

== Career statistics ==
As of match played 20 September 2022

Appearances and goals by club, season and competition
Club	Season	League			FA Cup		EFL Cup		Other		Total	
Club	Season	Division	Apps	Goals	Apps	Goals	Apps	Goals	Apps	Goals	Apps	Goals
Forest Green Rovers	2020–21	EFL League Two	0	0	0	0	0	0	1 (Note: Appearance in EFL Trophy)	0	1	0
Forest Green Rovers	2021–22	EFL League Two	0	0	0	0	0	0	1	0	1	0
Forest Green Rovers	2022–23	EFL League One	0	0	0	0	0	0	1	0	1	0
Forest Green Rovers	Total		0	0	0	0	0	0	3	0	3	0
Career total			0	0	0	0	0	0	3	0	3	0
