= History of the Jews in New Zealand =

Jews of New Zealand יהודיי ניו זילנד
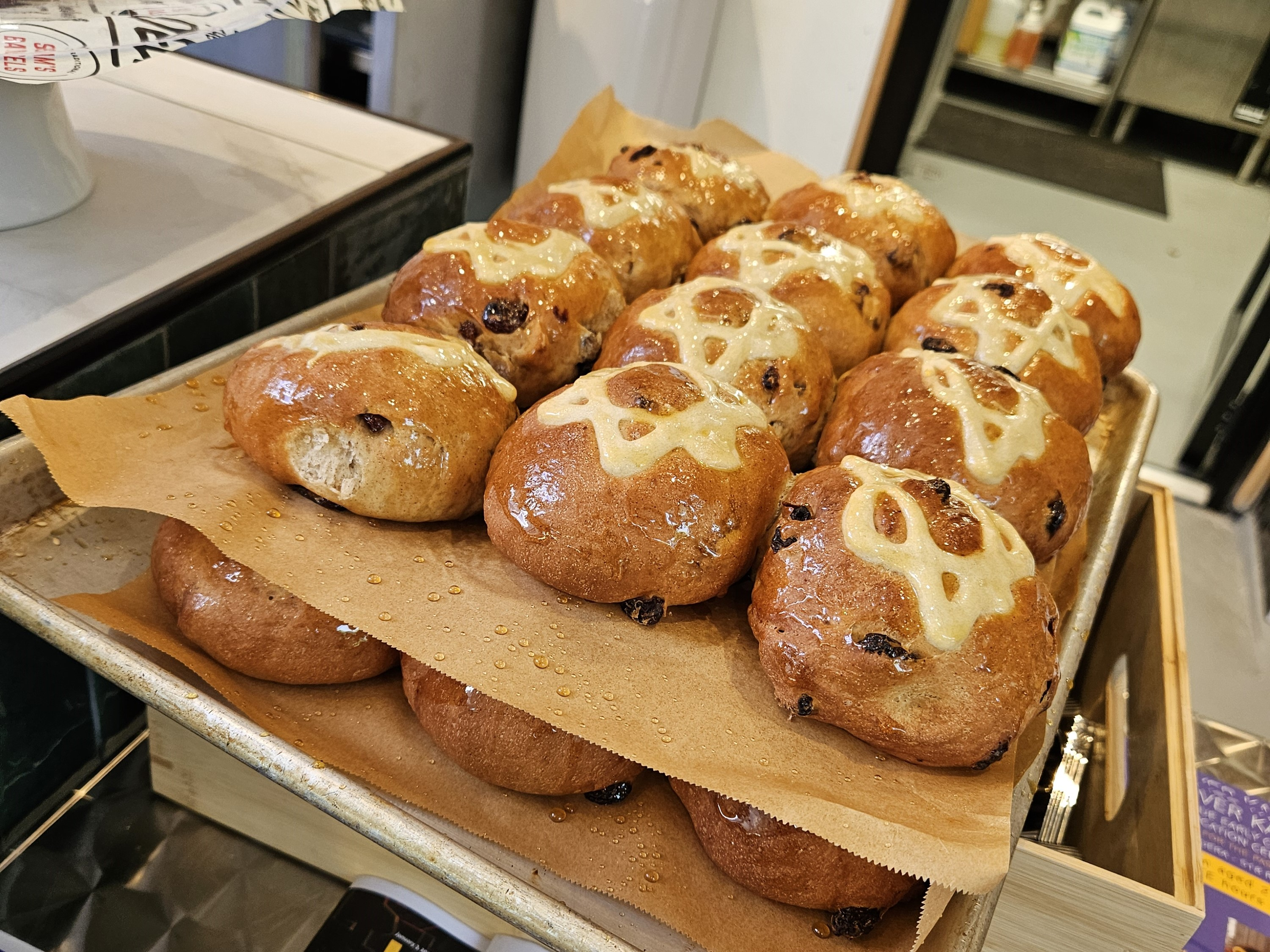
- Star of David hot cross buns for sale at the Kosher Deli, Auckland Hebrew Congregation, Remuera, Auckland

Total population
- 5538, per census

Regions with significant populations
- Auckland, Wellington

Languages
- English, Hebrew, Yiddish

Religion
- Judaism

Related ethnic groups
- Israeli New Zealanders; South African New Zealanders; Anglo-Israelis

New Zealand Jews, whether by culture, ethnicity, or religion, form the third largest Jewish community in Oceania, behind Australia (118,000) and Hawaii (8,000–10,000).

The Jewish community in New Zealand is composed predominantly of Ashkenazi Jews. Other Jewish ethnic divisions are also represented and include Sephardi Jews, Mizrahi Jews, and Bene Israel. A number of converts to Judaism make up the New Zealand Jewish community, which manifests a wide range of Jewish cultural traditions and the full spectrum of Jewish religious observance. Though they are a small minority, they have had an open presence in the country since the first Jewish immigrants began arriving in 1829. New Zealand has had three Jewish prime ministers or premiers: Julius Vogel (1873–1875), Francis Bell (1925) and John Key (2008–2016).

The first Jewish settlers in New Zealand were Anglo-Jewish traders. Small numbers of Anglo-Jewish immigrants followed, some subsidized by a Jewish charity in London which had a mission of caring for the poor and orphaned young people in the community. These "subsidised" Jewish immigrants were also intended by their benefactors to be devout members of the fledgling Jewish community in Wellington, to which the respected English business leader Abraham Hort, Senior, was sent from London to organise along London religious lines. The difficulties of life in early colonial New Zealand, together with historically high rates of intermarriage, made it hard to maintain strict religious observation in any of the new congregations.

Following news of gold rushes, Jewish immigrants poured in from new lands such as Germany, and then moved on when the boom was over. These immigrants, and others from Eastern Europe, faced an increasingly stringent immigration policy throughout the end of the 19th and mid 20th century, but Jewish New Zealanders and their descendants have continued to contribute in business, medicine, politics, and other areas of New Zealand life, at the highest levels, and the spectrum of Jewish religious observance continues in communities throughout the country.

The New Zealand Jewish Council, established in 1981, acts as a representative body of Jewish communities in New Zealand. It responds to antisemitism in New Zealand and the New Zealand government's foreign policy and attitudes towards the State of Israel and the Middle East. A 2022 survey of antisemitism in New Zealand focused attention on several areas of concern such as Holocaust denial and left-wing antisemitism. In 2020, a new organisation, Alternative Jewish Voices, was formed by Jewish New Zealanders who distinguish Judaism from Zionism and do not equate criticism of Israel with antisemitism.

== Settlement (1829–1849) ==
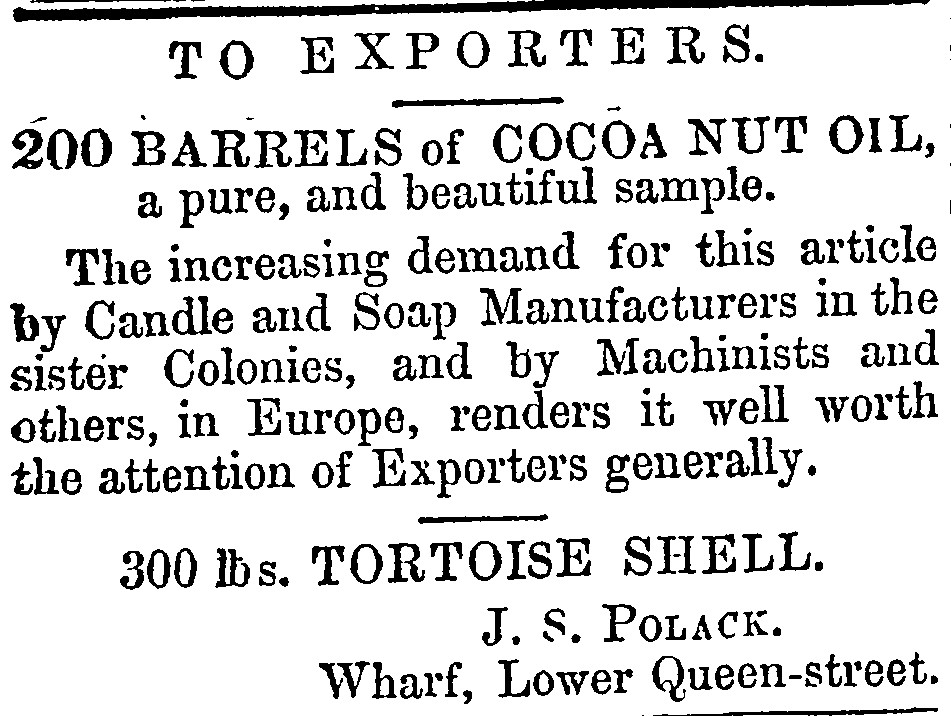
Joel Samuel Polack's trade advertisement

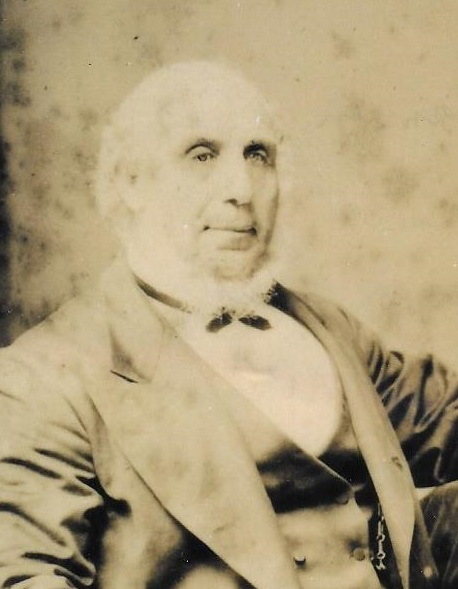
Solomon Levy, 1817–1883, Wellington New Zealand. Levy arrived from London with his brother Benjamin in 1840. He helped to found the Jewish synagogue in Wellington, taught Hebrew to Wellington's Jewish children for many years, but was himself married to his sister's Christian shipmate, and their children were raised Christian.

Anglo-Jewish traders were among the early immigrants from the 1830s onwards.

Joel Samuel Polack, the best known and most influential of them, arrived in New Zealand in 1831. Polack, an English-born Jew, opened a general store at Kororāreka in the Bay of Islands, where, following the tradition of centuries of European "Port Jews", his respect for the Māori people's culture earned him unique access and insights as a trader.

John Israel Montefiore, also an English-born Jew, left Sydney, Australia for New Zealand in October 1831. He became a merchant in Tauranga and Kororareka, and later, Auckland, where he featured prominently in civic affairs.

Returning briefly to England in 1837, Polack wrote two popular books about his 1831–37 travels in New Zealand. In addition to being entertaining travel guides to new tastes (hearts of palm, for example), sights and sounds (Māori tattoos, exotic birds), etc., his books were a rallying cry for commercial development, specifically for flax production which he believed was possible on a lucrative scale.

In 1838, in testimony to a House of Lords inquiry into the state of the islands of New Zealand, Polack warned that unorganised European settlement would destroy Māori culture, and advocated planned colonisation. With the signing of the Treaty of Waitangi on 6 February 1840, the way was cleared for colonisation and the first legitimate immigrants. The British government and the speculative New Zealand Company, among whose financial backers was the wealthy Anglo-Jewish Goldsmid family anticipated (wrongly, as it turned out, at least in the next few decades) that land would increase in value, and encouraged a flood of subsidised mostly English and Scottish emigrants.

Abraham Hort, Jr, related by family and business ties to the Mocatta & Goldsmid bank, arrived in Wellington on the barque Oriental on 31 January 1840 accompanied by two brothers he employed as cabinet makers, Solomon and Benjamin Levy. These were the first recognisably Jewish names in this early wave of post-Treaty settlement.

Hort's business and civic leadership was quickly recognised in the new colony. Within months of his arrival he was elected one of the two constables for Wellington's fledgling police force. Hort was a promoter of early Wellington civic affairs, Jewish and non-Jewish.

David Nathan was an important Auckland businessman and benefactor, who is perhaps best known for establishing the firm L.D. Nathan and Company. He left Sydney for the Bay of Islands on the Achilles on 21 February 1840.

Nathaniel William Levin was another early immigrant, who became a notable merchant in Wellington and a politician. He arrived in Wellington on 30 May 1841 on the Arachne.

=== Economic and religious factors in early Anglo-Jewish emigration ===
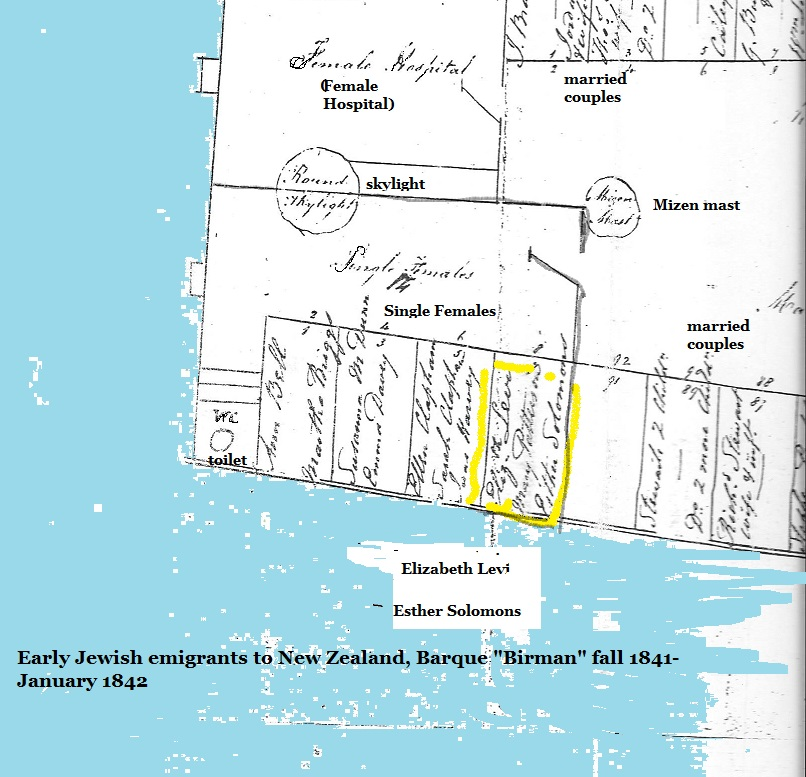
Annotated Birman map

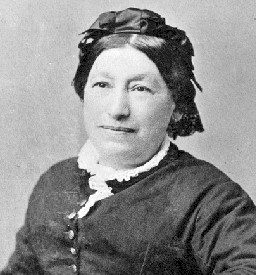
Esther Solomon Levy 1824–1911

Hort's father, Abraham Hort Senior saw New Zealand as a possible haven for impoverished English Jews and a potential refuge for oppressed Jews of eastern Europe and elsewhere. The Jews' Hospital (Neveh zedak), which was largely funded by the Goldsmid family, sponsored two Jewish women to emigrate in 1841 on the barque Birman: Elizabeth Levy, (sister of the Levy brothers), and Esther Solomon, who was being sent to marry one of the brothers.

Bills allowing Jews more civil rights in England had been introduced and repeatedly voted down, and Jews in the 19th century continued to be portrayed with racist stereotypes. Among the promises of emigration for Jews was that the lack of manpower would level the ethnic playing field

=== Early Jewish ceremonies ===
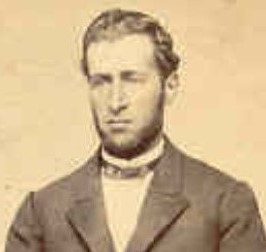
Benjamin Levy 1818–1853

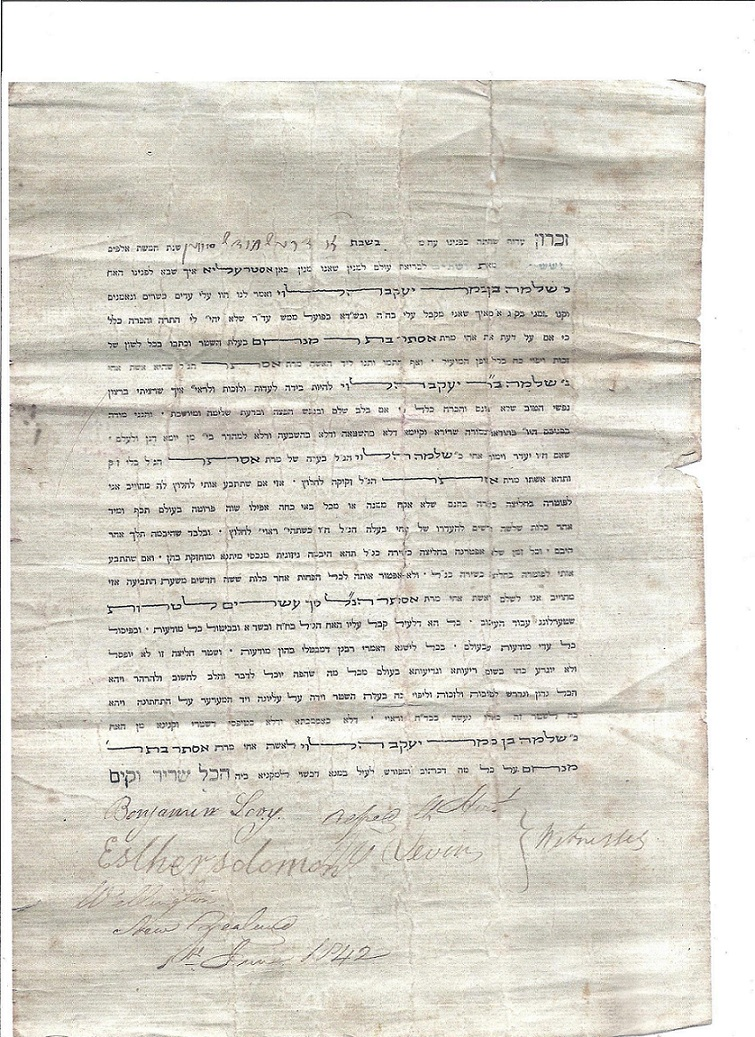
Marriage Contract of Esther Solomon and Benjamin Levy, Wellington, 1 June 1842.

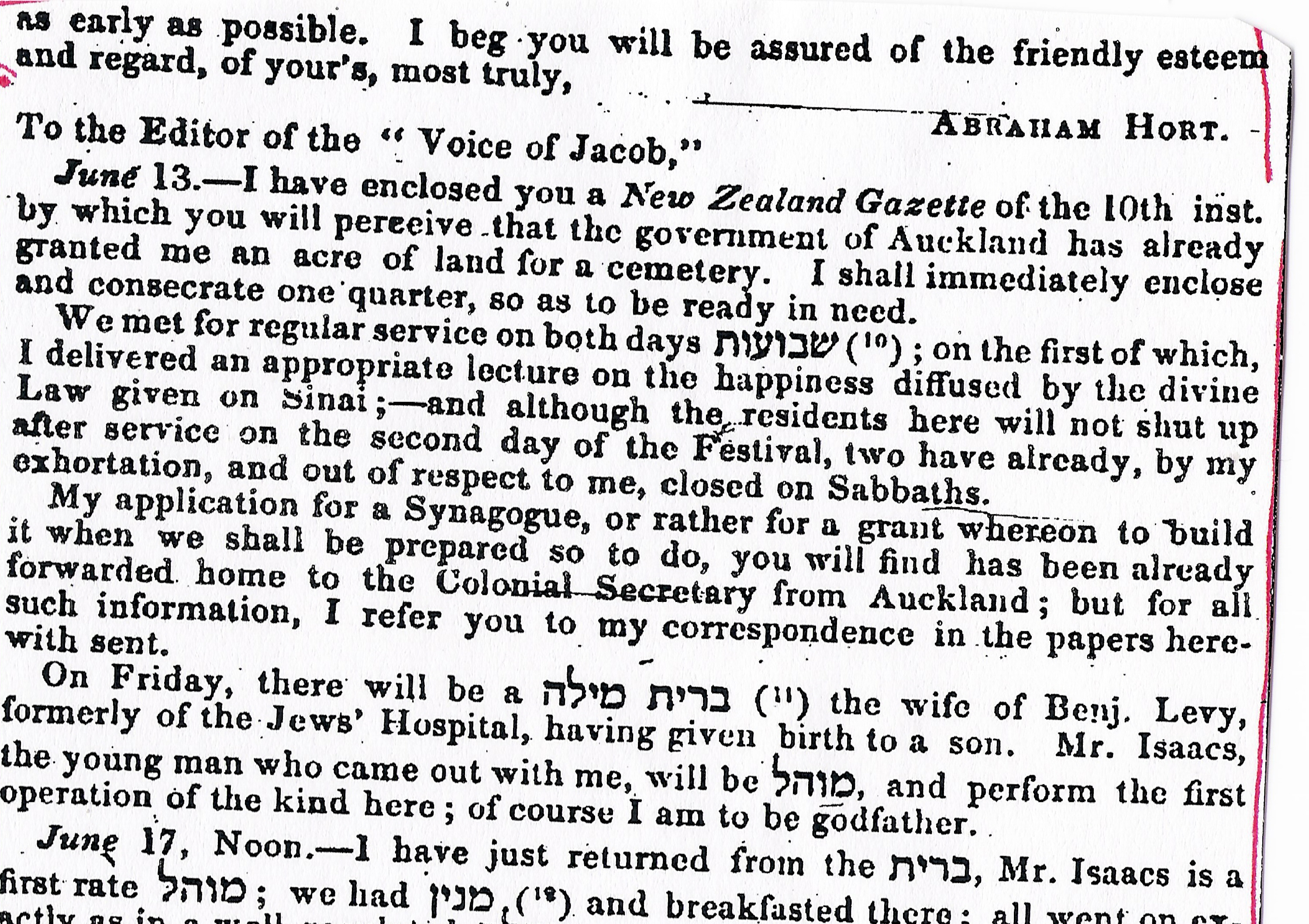
Bris 13 June 1843

The first Jewish ceremony in New Zealand was the marriage of businessman David Nathan to Rosetta Aarons, the widow of Captain Michael Aarons, on 31 October 1841. Their daughter, Sarah Nathan, born 10 January 1843, was the first known Jewish birth in New Zealand. The second ceremony, the marriage of Esther Solomon and Benjamin Levy was on 1 June 1842 in Wellington, according to the ketubah contract in Hebrew, witnessed by Alfred Hort (another of Abraham Hort Senior's sons) and another early Jewish emigrant Nathaniel William Levin. Levin, for whom the town of Levin was later named, soon married Hort Senior's daughter, Jessy, further connecting the small group of early Wellington Jews.

In early 1843, Abraham Hort, Sr. arrived in Wellington, where he organised and promoted the Jewish community, with the approval of London's Chief Rabbi. Hort brought with him David Isaacs, also an alumnus of the Jews' Hospital. Isaacs served as Mohel (to perform circumcisions), shochet (kosher butcher) and chazan (Cantor/lay leader for services). The first religious service was performed soon after, on 7 January 1843. A few months later, the new community celebrated the birth of Benjamin's and Esther's first child, Henry Emanuel Levy, which Hort documented in a series of letters sent to The Jewish Chronicle (the premier London Jewish newspaper of the time).

Acting on behalf of the community, Hort requested a plot of land for a synagogue and a plot of land for Jewish burials, offering himself as one of the trustees. The request was originally denied, the government responding that it didn't have the authority.

The death of the Levy's second son, aged 8 months in 1845 was, Hort wrote to the Chronicle, "our first Jewish corpse" and the "first Jewish burial" in the new Jewish cemetery. Throughout the early 1840s, Hort's letters to the London Jewish Chronicle and the Voice of Jacob reveal the difficulty of maintaining a Jewish community that could barely muster a minyan, owing to the demands of making a living, and complaining how few Jewish shopkeepers respected the sabbath by closing their doors, let alone celebrating Jewish holidays properly. A Māori massacre, the threat of forced militia service for all, and the extreme difficulty of making a living, took their toll on the small community. Isolation rapidly gave way to intermarriage. Solomon Levy quickly married Jane Harvey, the 14-year-old Christian shipmate of Esther Solomon and Elizabeth Levy. Although only one of his eight surviving children chose Judaism as a religion, Levy helped found the first Wellington synagogue and taught Hebrew to Jewish children for many years.

== Mid-1800s gold rushes ==
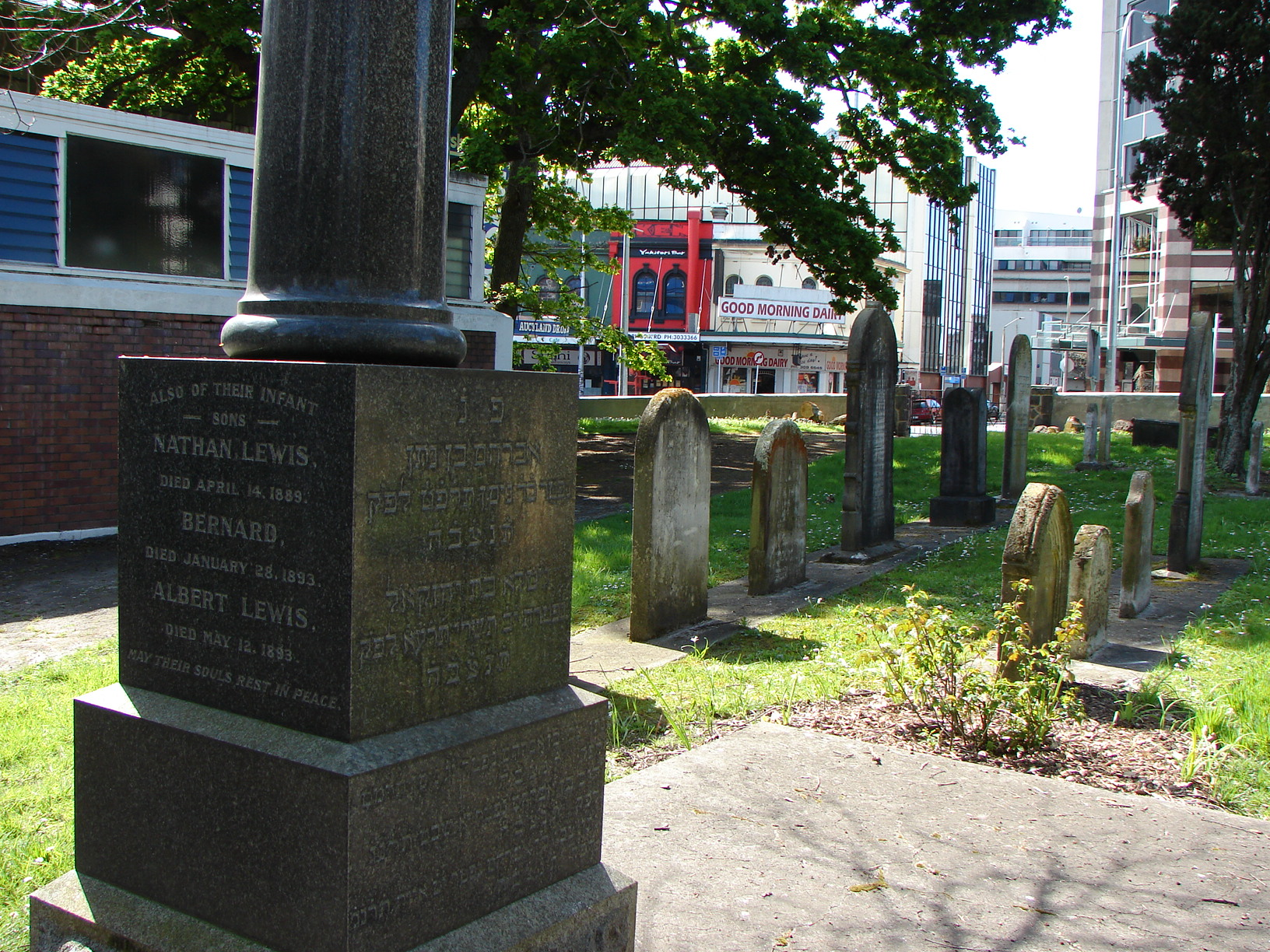
A Jewish cemetery in Auckland, founded in the mid-nineteenth century.

In 1849–1850 the California Gold Rush led to an exodus of early New Zealand Jewish settlers, including Joel Samuel Polack, Benjamin Levy, and Abraham Hort. For those who remained, gold rushes in New Zealand in the 1860s, the Otago gold rush from 1861 and the West Coast gold rush from 1864 shifted their businesses from centres like Auckland and Wellington to new towns and (like Sir Julius Vogel) to Dunedin in the South Island. In 1862, the congregation in Dunedin had 43 members. Those drawn to gold strikes in the 1860s and after, were instrumental in founding businesses and helping to erect the many synagogues that were established at this time.

== Late 19th century ==
Restrictions were instituted in 1881 that effectively closed off immigration to immigrants who were not from England, Ireland, or Scotland, who were Asian, or any other culture deemed too foreign (a category which also included eastern European Jews). New Zealand, like Australia, had struggled with its white, Christian identity. Some have attributed this attitude to New Zealand's geographic isolation at the time, to fear of economic competition, to the dilution of a perceived "white" culture.

== 20th century ==
As a result of the restrictions put into place earlier, few Jews were granted refuge in New Zealand before, during or after the Holocaust. First called "enemy aliens" because of their German nationality, popular sentiment suggested that they leave as soon as the war was over, as they were competing with New Zealanders for work. The major veterans group, the Returned Services' Association, in 1945 suggested that not only should the "enemy aliens" go back where they came from, but that any money they had made during their stay should be turned over to the wives and children of the soldiers, who had risked their lives while the Jews had allegedly stayed safely in New Zealand.

== Role in leadership ==
Three Prime Ministers have Jewish ancestry, although only Julius Vogel, who served twice during the 1870s, practised Judaism. Francis Bell was PM very briefly in 1925. Former Prime Minister John Key was born to an Austrian Jewish mother and is thus considered Jewish under Halakha, though he is not practising.

== 21st century ==
=== Religious and cultural developments ===
Moriah School, Wellington's only Jewish day school opened in 1985. It closed in December 2012, citing a lack of resources and fewer than 20 pupils.

In 2010 the practice of shechita, the ritual slaughter of kosher animals such as cows, sheep and chickens attracted controversy when the Minister of Agriculture reversed a decision that had banned it. The issue was about to be heard in the High Court but pressure from Jewish community members who wanted to slaughter poultry in the traditional manner promoted the move.

In recent years a small but growing Chabad movement has been established in several cities, including Christchurch and Auckland. The Chabad house in Christchurch was destroyed in the 2011 earthquake that hit New Zealand. International Jewish fundraising efforts helped the Chabad community to rebuild.

In 2019, with the assistance of the Woolf Fisher Trust, the Auckland Hebrew Congregation purchased the campus of Saint Kentigern Girls' School in Remuera. Kadimah relocated from Grey's Avenue to the Remuera campus in 2023. Other Jewish organisations and the Kosher café/deli are also in the process of relocating to the site, creating the main hub for Jewish life in Auckland. The city's Reform congregation, Beth Shalom has also been invited to relocate to the campus.

In October 2023, a Moishe House home opened in Auckland, joining the international network of homes that serve as a Jewish communal hub for young adults.

== Founding of synagogues ==
There are seven synagogues across New Zealand. Three early synagogues, at Nelson, Hokitika, and Timaru are no longer in existence. Hokitika's synagogue, which served the boom and bust Gold Rush Jewish population, was virtually abandoned for the last decades of the 19th century and was known as "the Ghost Synagogue."

The Dunedin Synagogue was established at Dunedin in September 1863 and lay claims to be the southernmost permanent synagogue in the world.

The Canterbury Hebrew Congregation obtained funds in 1863 to build a small wooden synagogue on a block of land in Gloucester Street (between Cambridge Terrace and Montreal Street) in Christchurch. The next synagogue, called Beth El Synagogue, was built on the same site and opened in 1881.

The first synagogue in Wellington was Beth El, established in 1870 at 222 The Terrace. By the 1920s, this wooden building with a capacity of 200 was too small for the city's 1400 participants and a new brick building was built on the same site and opened in 1929. The site was required to be vacated for motorway construction in 1963, and a new Wellington Jewish Community Centre was opened at 74–80 Webb Street in 1977. In 1959, the Progressive Jewish congregation Temple Sinai was established in Wellington by John Levi.

In Auckland, a synagogue building was designed in 1884–85 and opened on 9 November 1885. The building still stands at 19A Princes Street, has heritage protection, and is now known as University House. The community moved to larger premises at Greys Avenue in 1967.

As of 2023, the AHC (Auckland Hebrew Congregation) which has the largest Jewish community in New Zealand, has moved to a new location in Remuera. After 50 years in the iconic custom built synagogue in Greys Avenue, the community made the decision to move to the suburbs which has a higher density of Jews, compared to the previous city location.

=== Gallery of synagogues ===
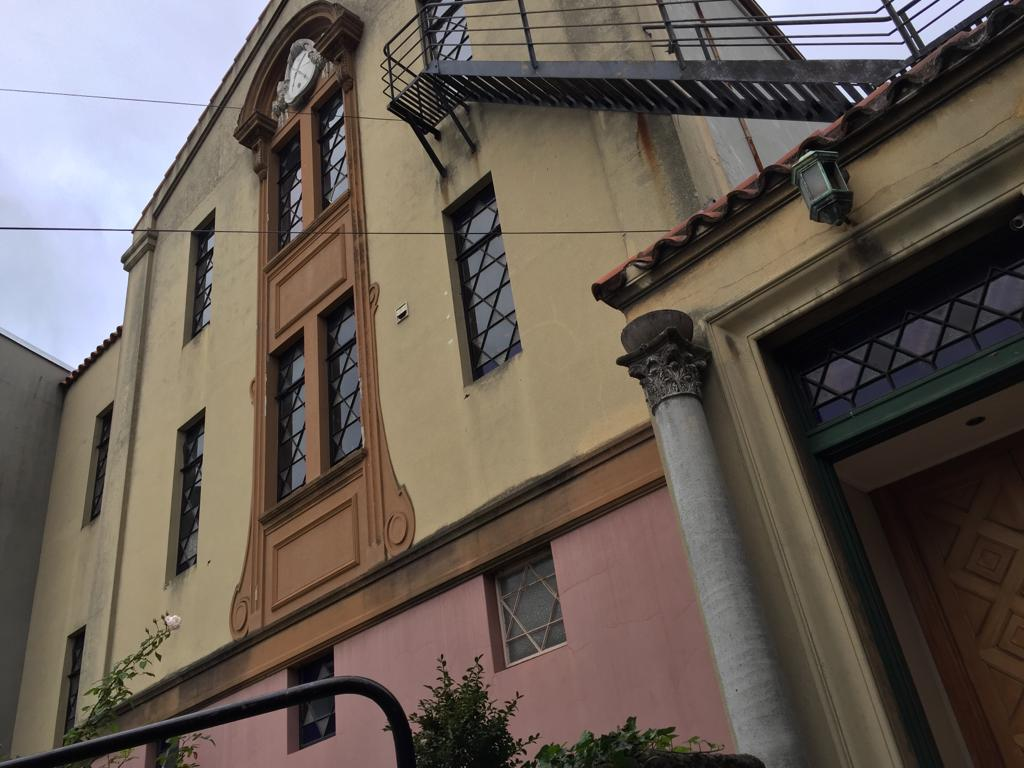
The former Dunedin Synagogue in Moray Place, built in 1863

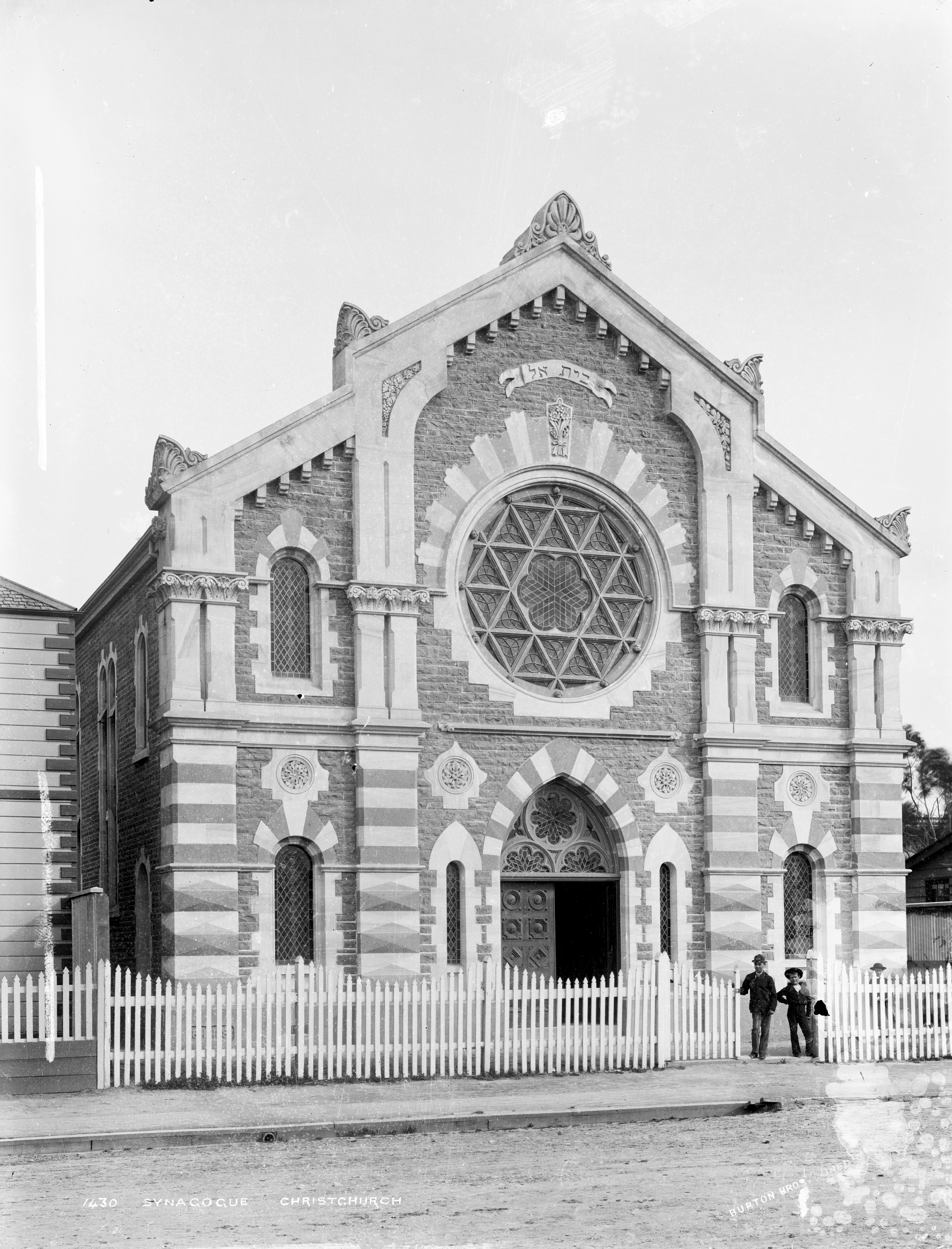
The old Beth El Synagogue on Gloucester Street, Christchurch, established in 1864

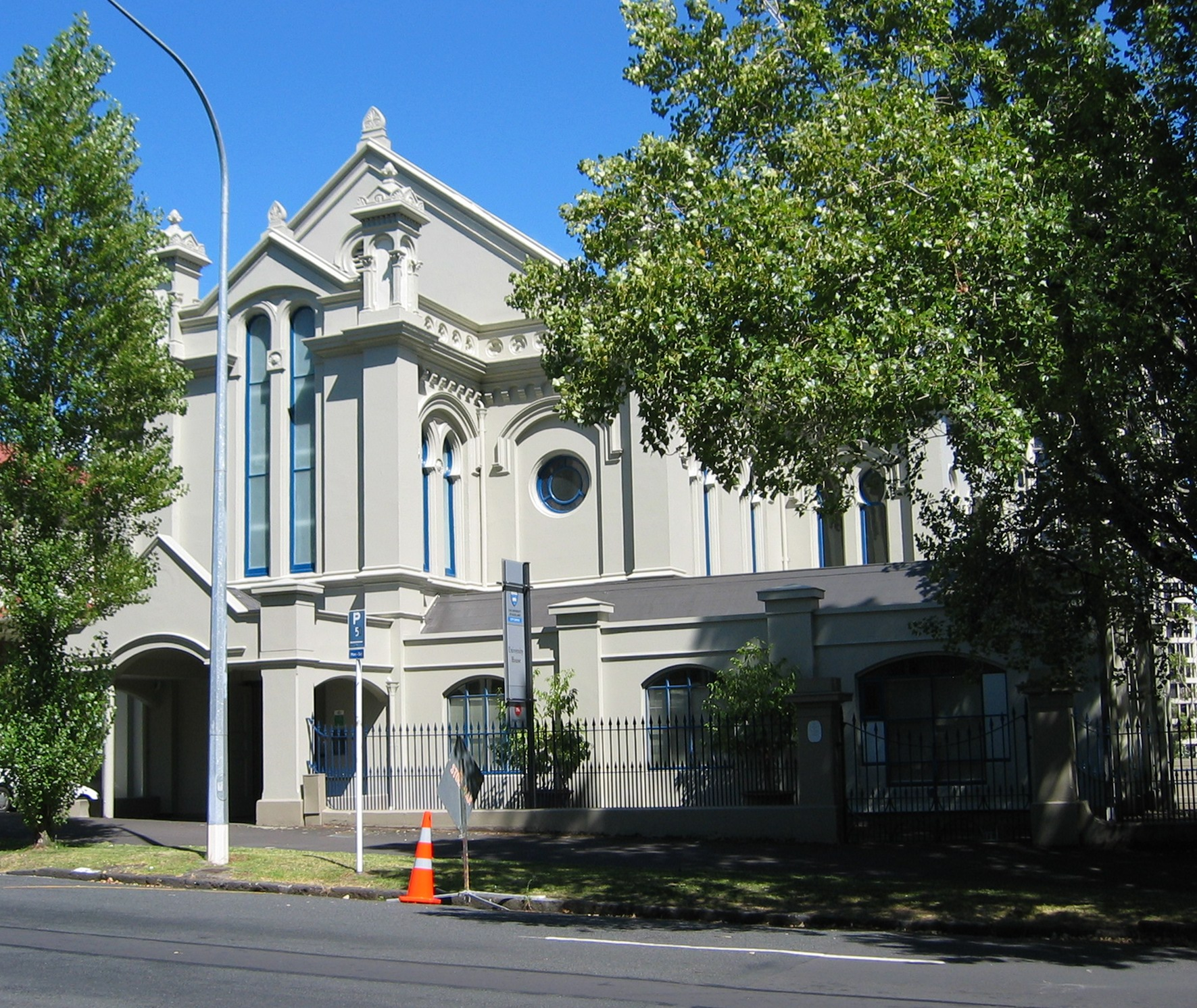
University House, the former Princes Street synagogue of the Auckland Hebrew Congregation, built in 1885

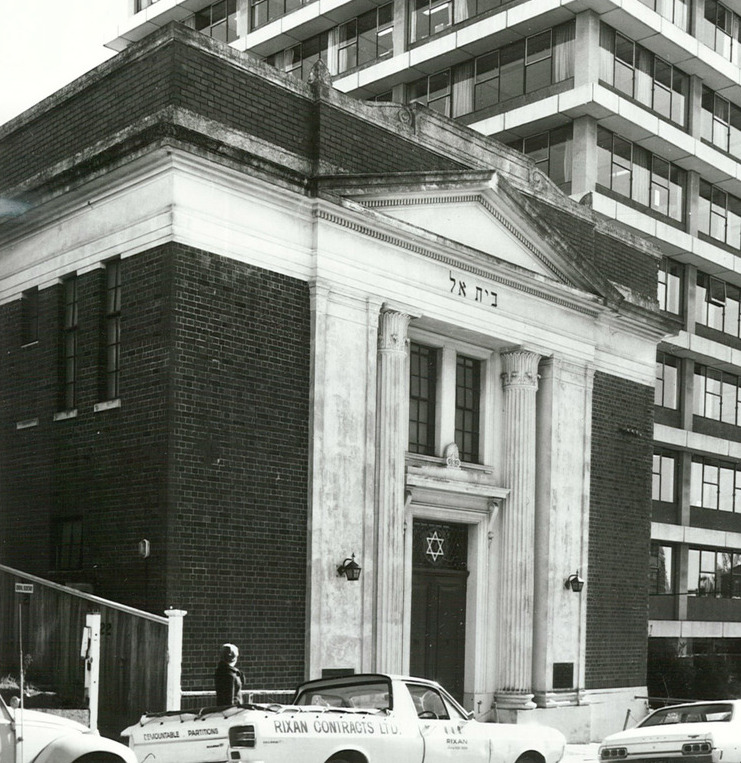
The former brick Beth El Synagogue in Wellington, built in 1929

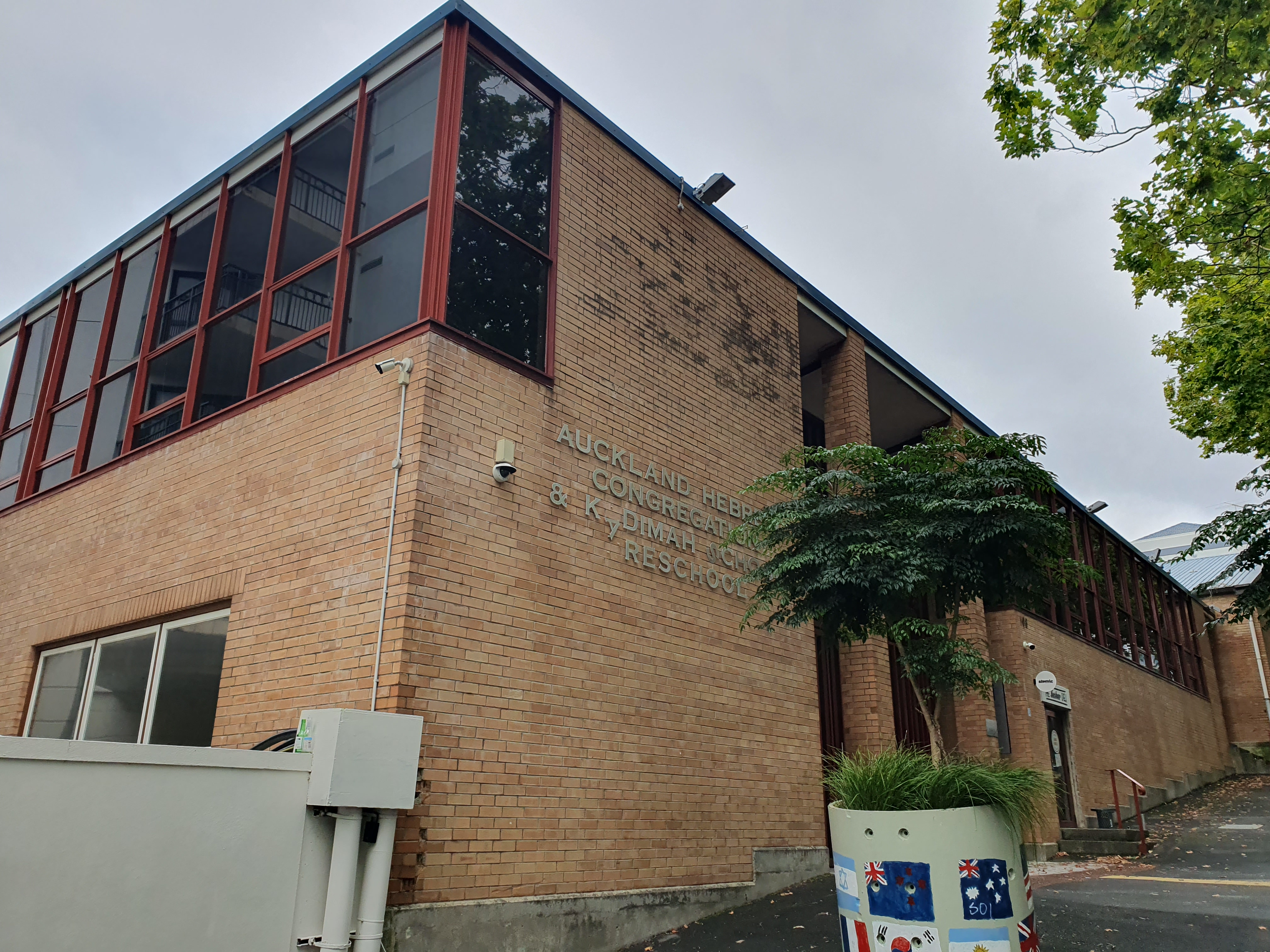
Former Greys Avenue synagogue of the Auckland Hebrew Congregation, built in 1968

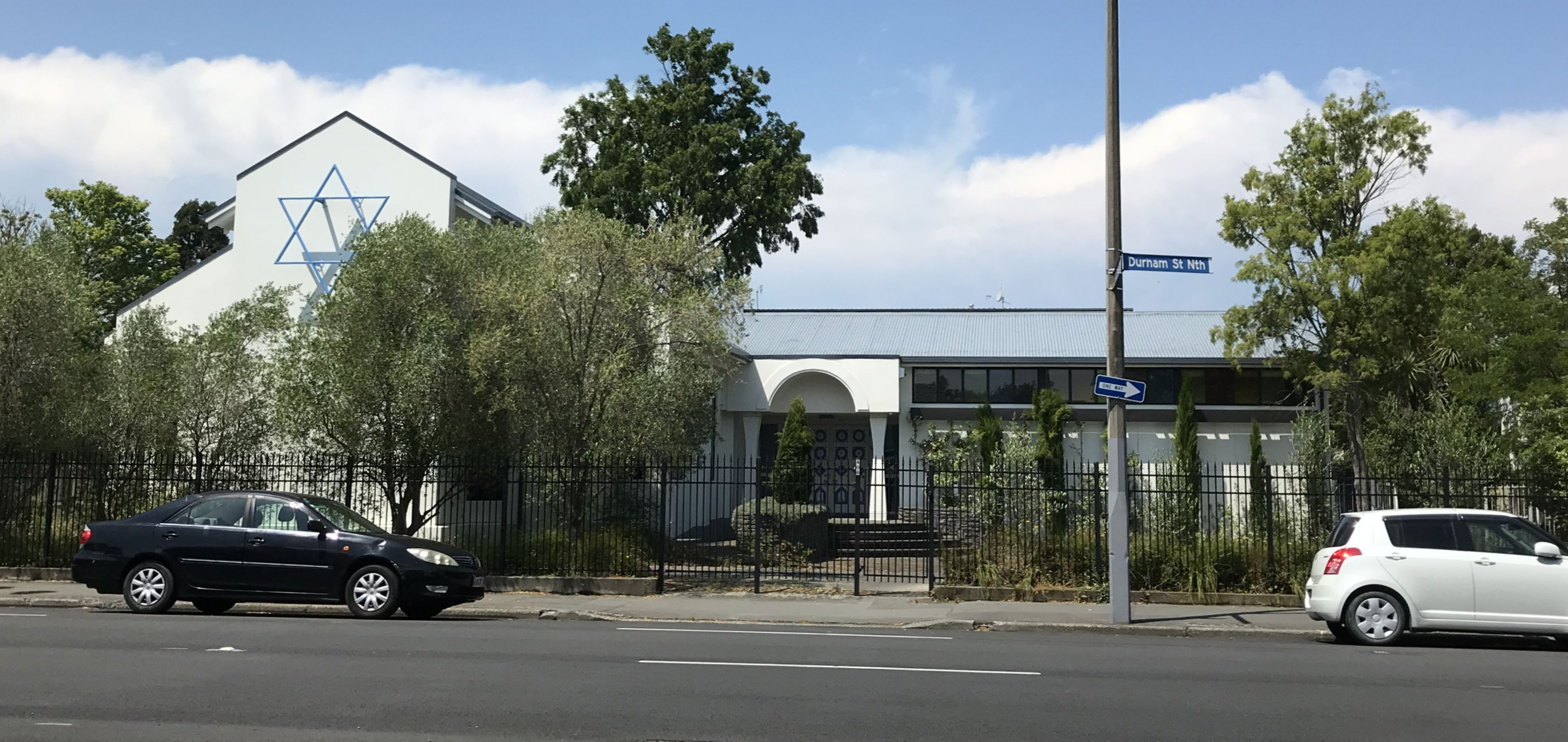
The new Beth El Synagogue on Durham Street, Christchurch, built in 1988

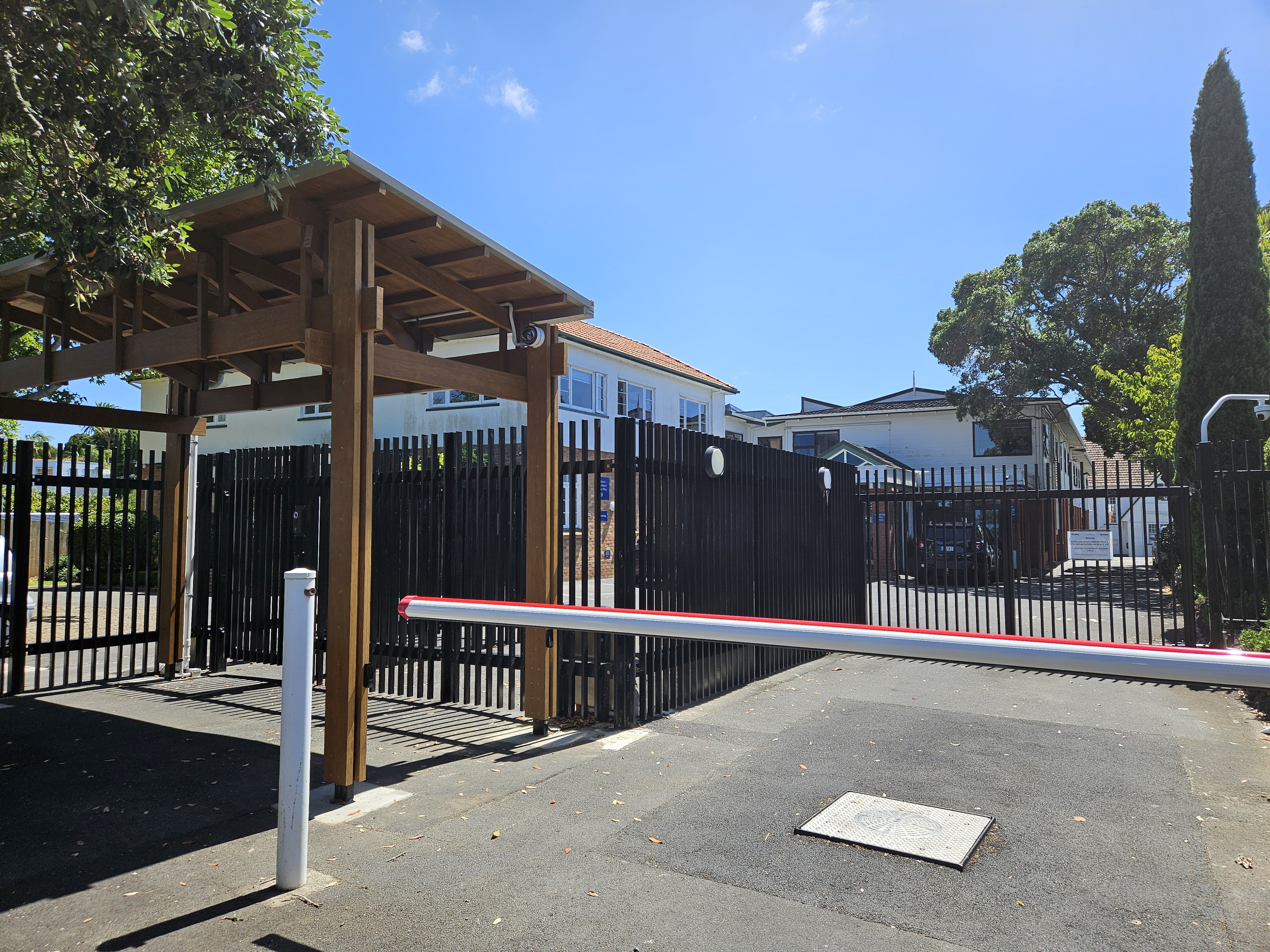
The Auckland Hebrew Congregation moved to the former site of Corran School in Remuera in 2022

== Demographics ==
In 1848, in New Zealand's total European population of 16,000 there were known to be at least 61 Jews, 28 in Wellington and 33 in Auckland. The 2013 New Zealand census data gives 6,867 people identifying as having a Jewish religious affiliation, out of the total New Zealand population of 4.5 million. In the 2018 New Zealand Census, 5,274 identified as having a Jewish religion, and in the 2023 New Zealand Census this had increased by 264 to 5,538 people identifying as Jewish.

In addition to the official census counts, there have been a range of estimations of the Jewish population in New Zealand which are significantly higher than the official count. In 2009, the Jewish Virtual Library estimated there were around 10,000 Jewish people, a claim repeated both by the New Zealand Jewish Council and the World Jewish Congress on their websites. In the 2012 book Jewish Lives in New Zealand, the authors suggest that there were more than 20,000 Jewish people in New Zealand, including non-practising Jews.

== See also ==
- List of Oceanian Jews
