= Waikumete Cemetery =

Cemetery in Auckland, New Zealand

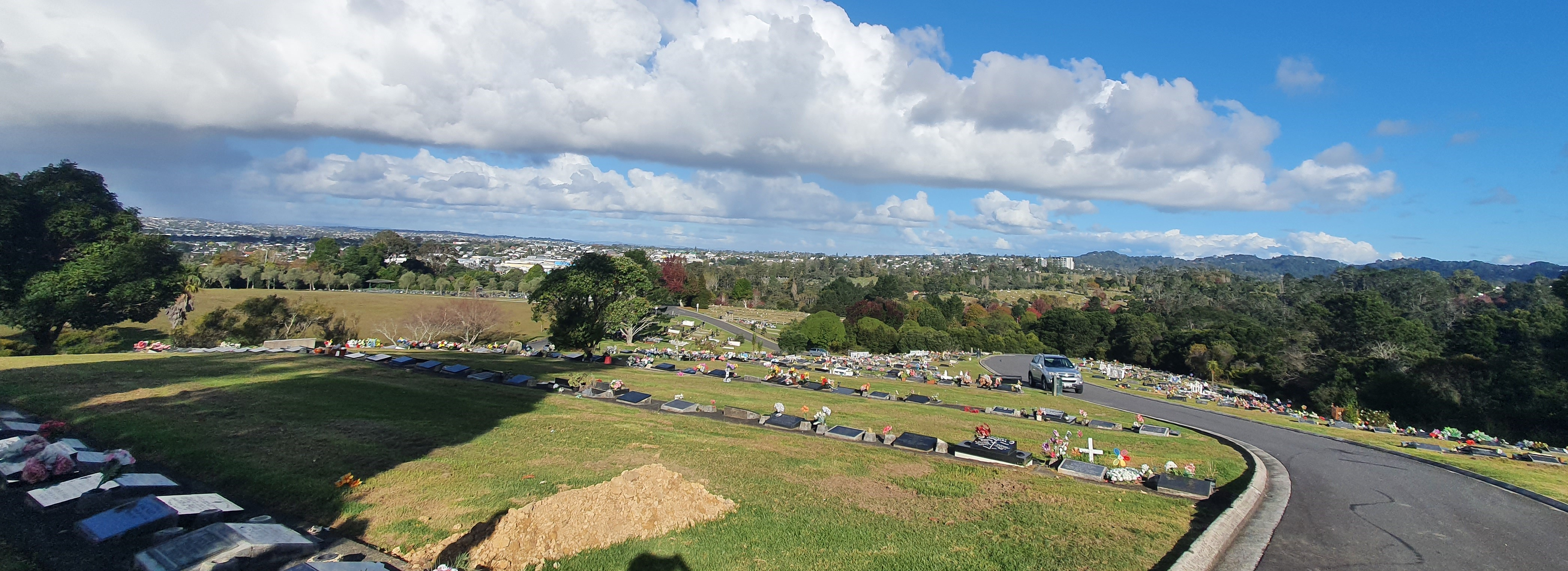
- Waikumete Cemetery in May 2022
- Interactive map of Waikumete Cemetery

Details
- Established: 1886
- Location: Glen Eden, Auckland
- Country: New Zealand
- Coordinates: 36°54′04″S 174°39′04″E
- Website: Official website

Waikumete Cemetery, originally Waikomiti Cemetery, is New Zealand's largest cemetery. It occupies a site of 108 hectares in Glen Eden, Auckland, and also contains a crematorium in the south-west corner of the cemetery.

== History ==
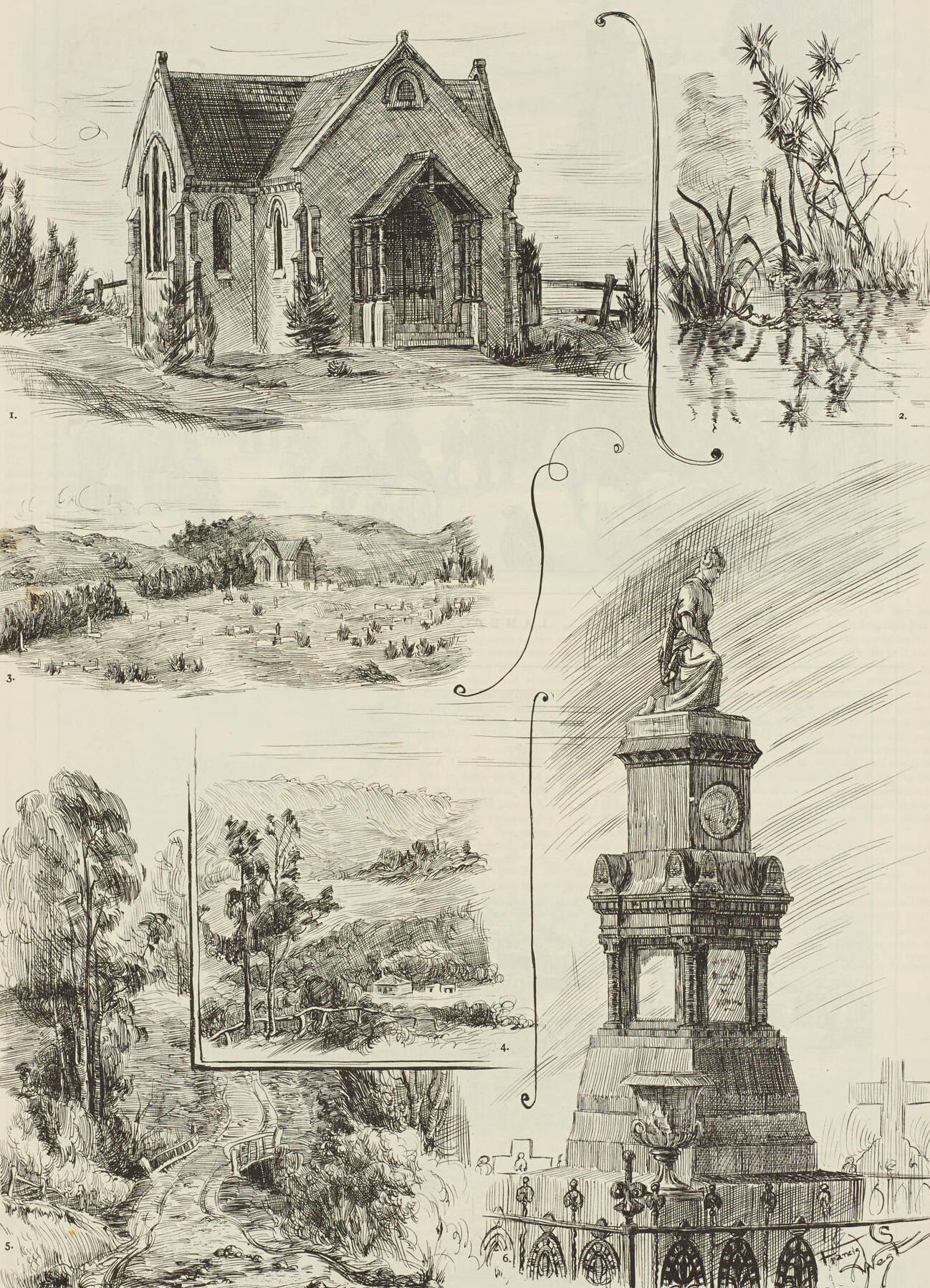
Drawings of Waikumete Cemetery in 1892

Waikumete Cemetery was established in 1886 and is the final resting place for over 70,000 people. It was established after the Symonds Street Cemetery was surrounded by residential housing, and its location was decided by the proximity of the nearby Glen Eden railway station, as access by railway was desired. Passengers would travel to Waikumete on the same train as their loved ones in special train services held on Sundays. The funeral carriage was separated from passengers, and used a separate platform. The Chapel of Faith in the Oaks was built in 1886 as a mortuary chapel and was used until the larger chapel was built in 1952. The Chapel of Faith in the Oaks were shared between local Methodist, Anglican and Pentecostal communities for church services, until the Methodist and Anglican churches were built in Glen Eden in 1910 and 1926 respectively.

The cemetery was used to bury bodies coming from the city of Auckland during the 1918 flu pandemic. Glen Eden residents themselves were mostly unaffected by the flu. An alarm would sound at the train station when the bodies were brought by train from the city. Most flu victims were buried in the non-denominational section of the cemetery, due to the lack of identifying knowledge about who many of the victims were.

In 1929, a major fire broke out at the cemetery, burning 100 acres of native bush that had been planted in the 19th century. In February 1939, the cemetery was involved in the first case of graverobbing in New Zealand, when two Australian visitors to Auckland, G R Mackey and J A Talbot, dug up the body of a recently buried soldier to use in an insurance scam, burning the body inside a bach at Piha.

Waikumete is home to a number of prominent memorials, including the Mount Erebus disaster memorial, a Holocaust memorial, a New Zealand 1918 flu pandemic memorial and an ANZAC cenotaph.

In 1952, a crematorium was constructed in the cemetery, that combined aspects of art deco and modernism in its design.

=== War graves ===
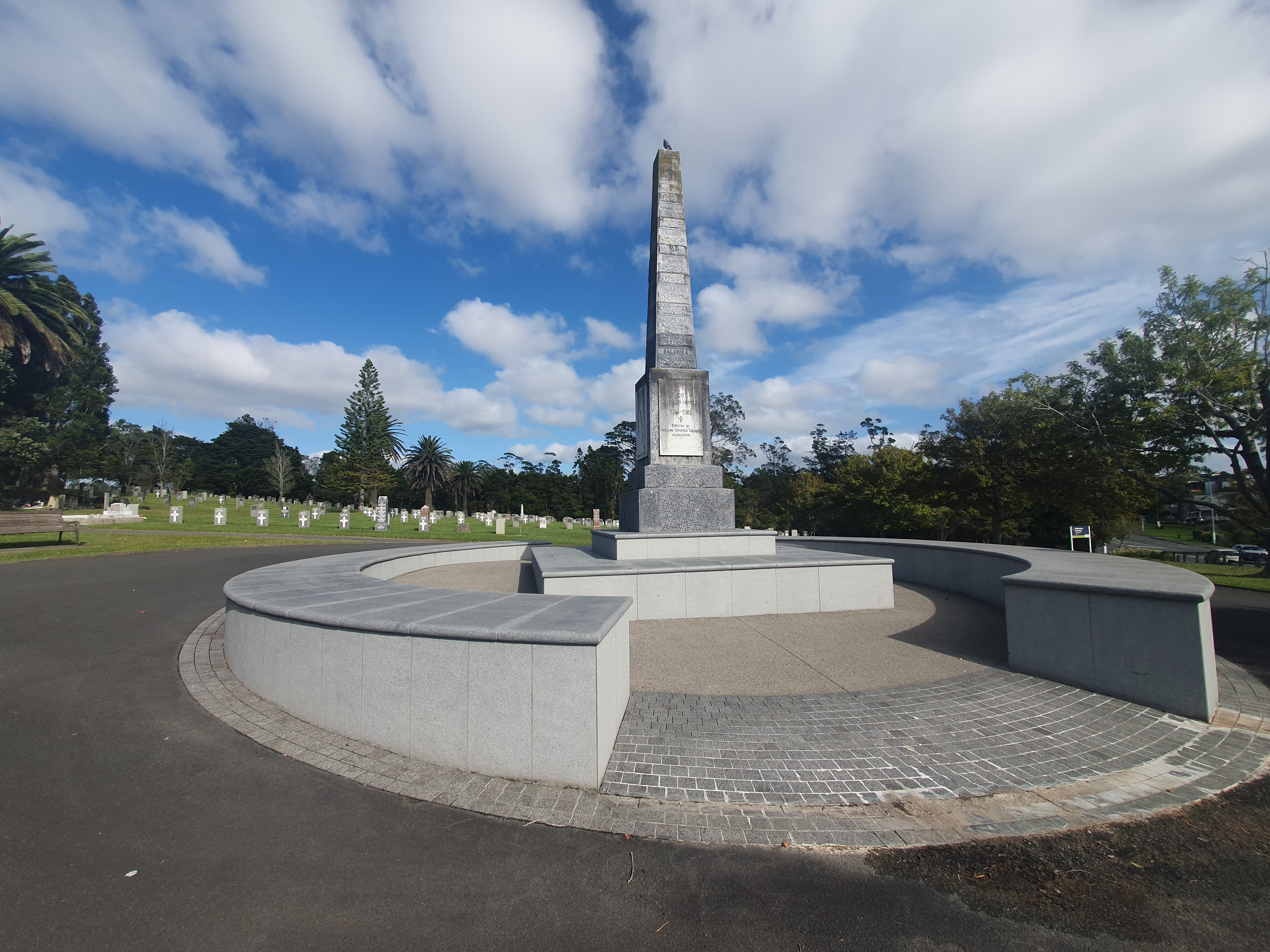
The Auckland Provincial Memorial

Two extensive areas of the cemetery were allocated for the burial of service personnel of the World Wars and post-war veterans. In total, the Commonwealth War Graves Commission register and maintain the graves of 285 Commonwealth service personnel at the cemetery, 110 from World War I and 176 from World War II.

In the entrance to the cemetery the Commission erected the Auckland Provincial Memorial, commemorating the 56 service personnel from the Auckland Province who died serving in and around New Zealand in both World Wars but have no known grave.

The commission also commemorates 44 World War II service personnel who were cremated at Waikumete Crematorium. In 1999, a memorial to seven personnel whose ashes were formerly stored in the chapel building was placed on the site of their final resting place in the chapel lawn.

== Burials ==
Some of the notable people buried at the cemetery include:

- Albert Asher (1879–1965), rugby union and rugby league footballer
- Don Buck (1869/70–1917), also known as Francisco Rodrigues Figueira, gum-digger and businessman
- Barry Butterworth (1939–1993), speedway driver
- Assid Corban (1925–2018), the first Mayor of Waitakere City and winemaker
- James Crichton (1879–1961), recipient of the Victoria Cross
- Angela D'Audney (1944–2002), Television New Zealand news anchor
- Father Felix Donnelly QSM ONZM (1929–2019), priest, broadcaster, Youthline founder
- Cameron Duncan (1986–2003), filmmaker and the inspiration for the song "Into the West"
- Pauly Fuemana (1969–2010), lead singer of OMC
- Rabbi Samuel Goldstein (1852–1935), Rabbi of the Auckland Hebrew Congregation.
- John Gildroy Grant (1889–1970), recipient of the Victoria Cross
- Richard Henderson MM (1895–1958), decorated stretcher bearer in World War I
- Paul Hewson (1953–1985), songwriter and keyboard player in NZ band Dragon
- Reginald Judson (1881–1972) recipient of the Victoria Cross, Distinguished Conduct Medal and the Military Medal
- Ray Lawless (1909–1968) New Zealand rugby league representative
- Bruce McLaren (1937–1970), race-car designer, driver, engineer, and inventor
- Rube McWilliams (1901–1984), All Black
- Ellen Melville (1882–1946), president of the National Council of Women of New Zealand and Auckland City Councillor
- Horace Neal (1896–1951) New Zealand rugby league representative
- Don Oliver MBE (1937–1996), weightlifter and fitness centre founder
- Tuna Scanlan (1934–2014), boxer
- Ian Scott (1945–2013), artist
- Maurice Shadbolt CBE (1932–2004), writer and playwright
- Samuel Shrimski (1828–1902), politician from Oamaru
- Arthur Singe (1898–1936), rugby union and rugby league footballer

== Gallery ==
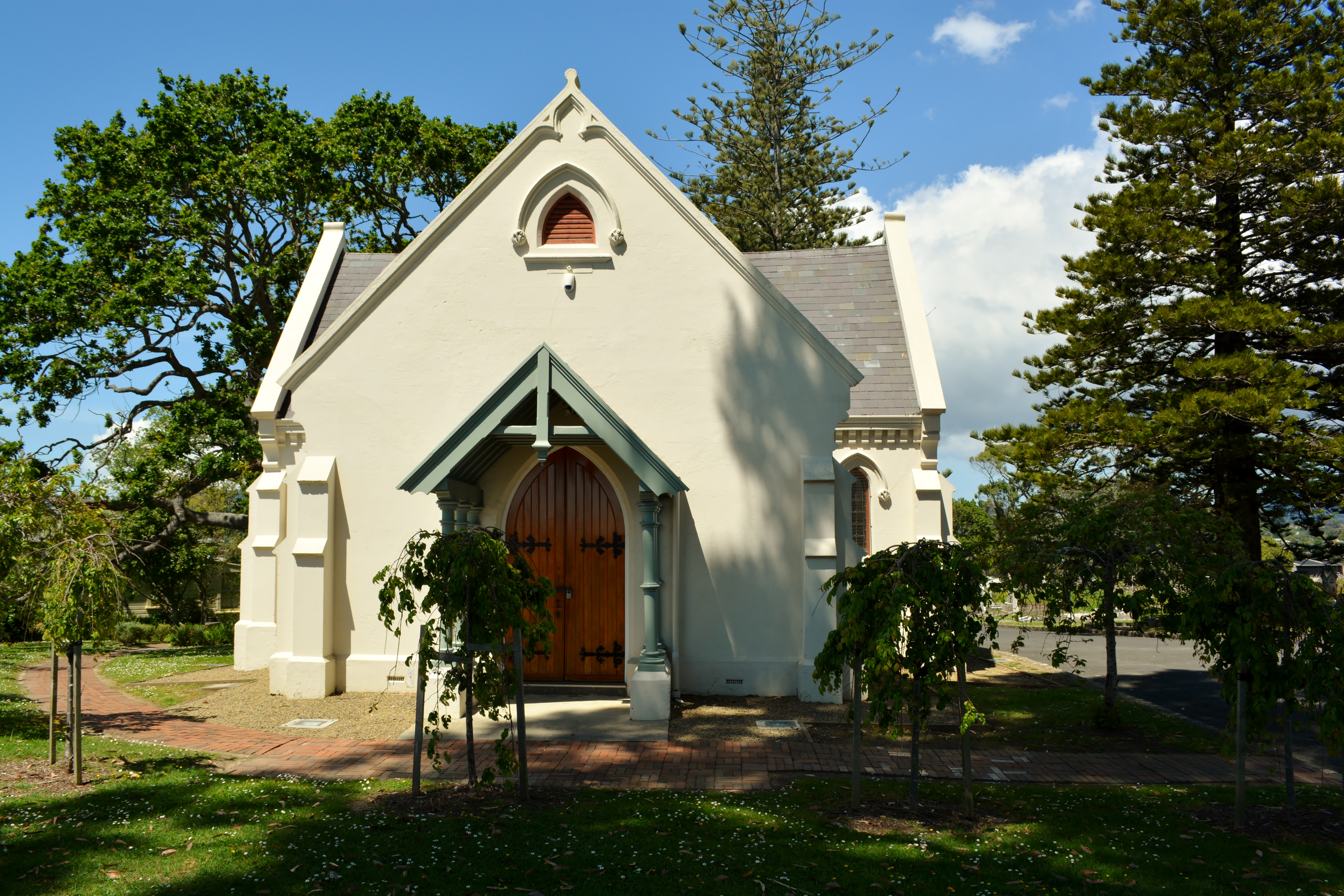
Chapel of Faith in the Oaks

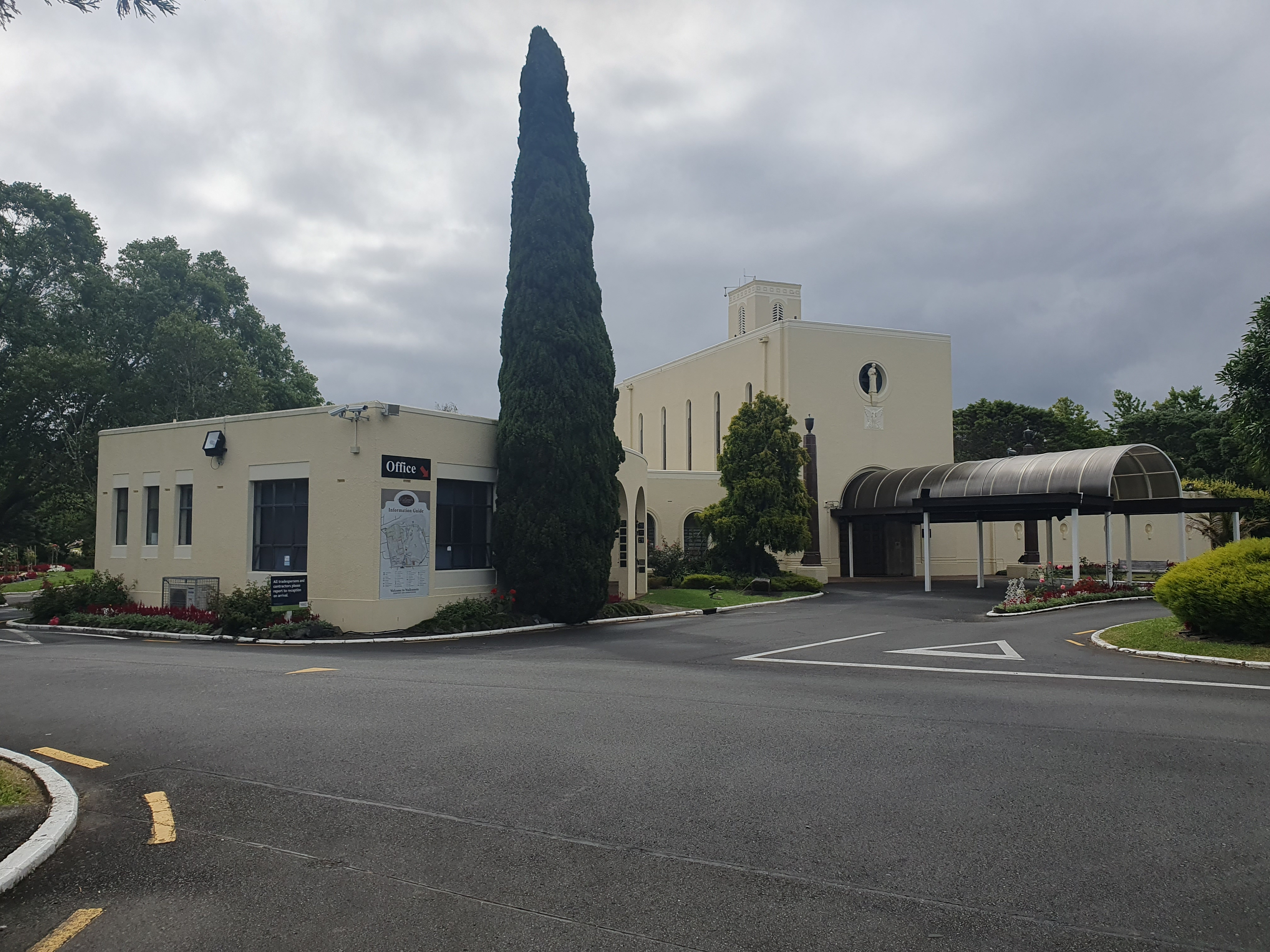
Waikumete Crematorium

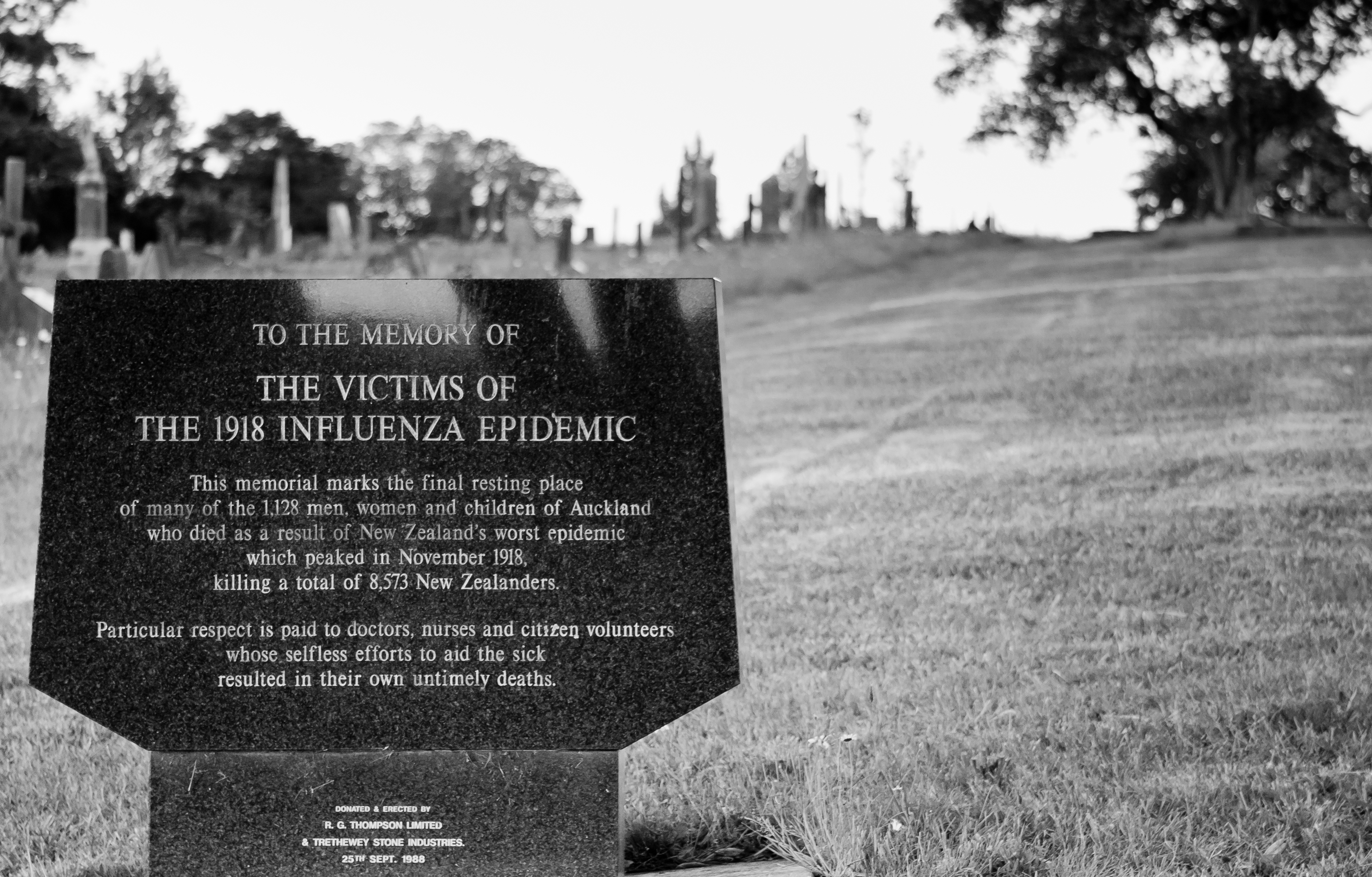
1918 Influenza epidemic burial site

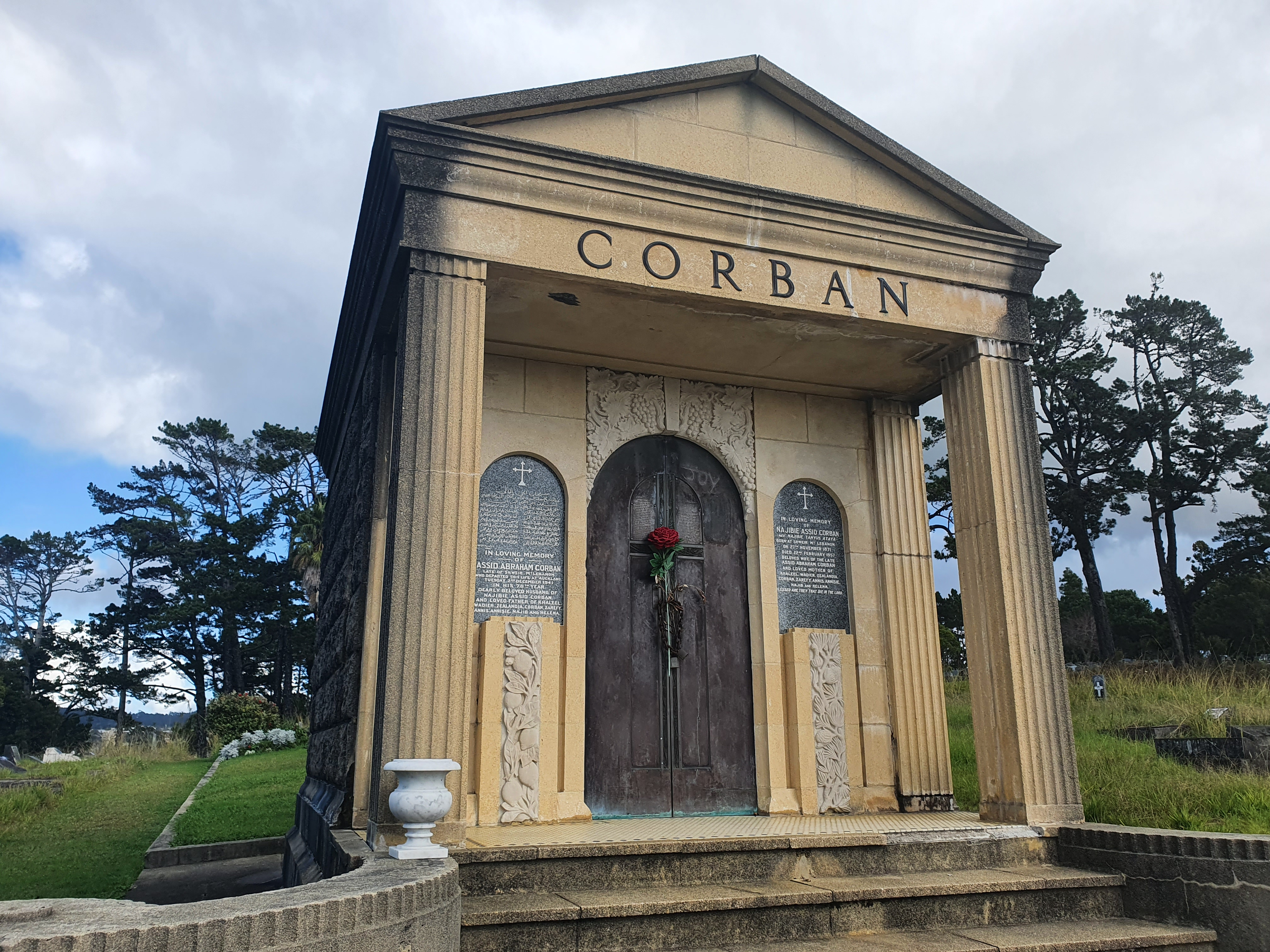
The Corban family mausoleum

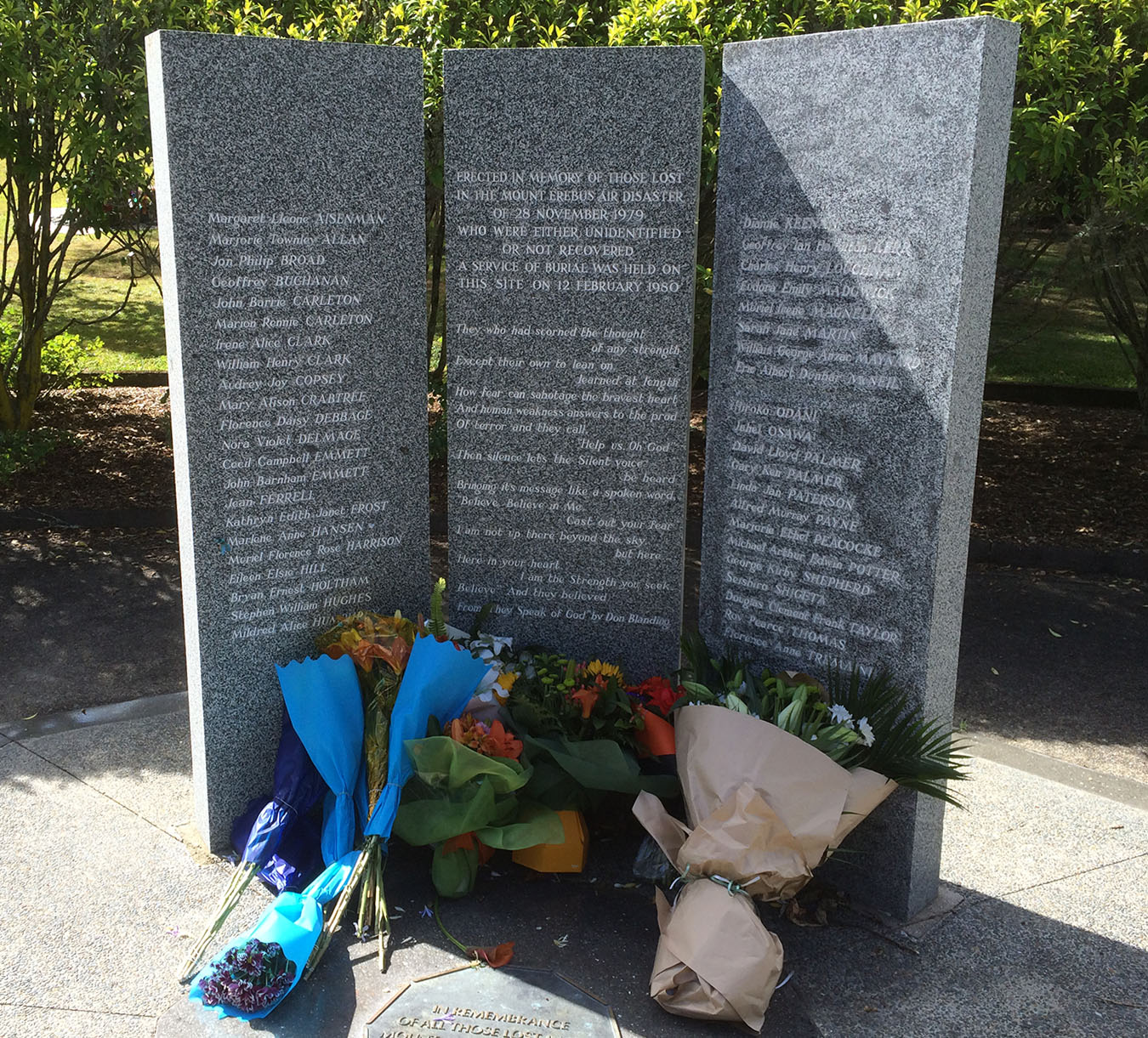
The Erebus Memorial

== See also ==
- List of cemeteries in New Zealand

== Bibliography ==
- Gray, Matthew (2009). "City of the Dead". In Macdonald, Finlay; Kerr, Ruth (eds.). West: The History of Waitakere. Random House. ISBN 978-1869790080.
- Harper, Glyn; Richardson, Colin (2007). In the Face of the Enemy: The Complete History of the Victoria Cross and New Zealand. Auckland, New Zealand: HarperCollins Publishers (New Zealand) Limited. ISBN 978-1869506506.
- Janssen, Peter (January 2021), Greater Auckland Walks, New Holland Publishers, OL 34023249W, Wikidata Q118136068
- Vela, Pauline, ed. (1989). In Those Days: An Oral History of Glen Eden. Glen Eden Borough Council. ISBN 0473008629.
