= Aaron Goldstein =

Aaron Goldstein may refer to:

- Aaron Goldstein (musician) (born 1983), Canadian musician
- Robert Aaron Gordon (1908–1978), American economist who was born Aaron Goldstein

== See also ==
- Samuel Aaron Goldstein (1852–1935), New Zealand rabbi
