= Tuna Scanlan =

Samoan / New Zealand boxer

Personal information
- Nickname: Tuna Frank
- Nationality: Samoan/New Zealander
- Born: Tuna Williard Scanlan; 12 July 1934 Apia, Samoa
- Died: 21 October 2014 (aged 80) Mount Roskill, New Zealand
- Height: 5 ft 7 in (1.70 m)
- Weight: middle/light heavyweight

Boxing career
- Reach: 70 in (178 cm)
- Stance: Southpaw

Boxing record
- Total fights: 64
- Wins: 42 (KO 22)
- Losses: 20 (KO 8)
- Draws: 2

Tuna Williard Scanlan (12 July 1934 – 21 October 2014) was a Samoan-born New Zealand professional middle/light heavyweight boxer of the 1950s and 1960s.

Scanlan was born in Apia, Samoa. He won the New Zealand Boxing Association middleweight title, and the British Commonwealth middleweight title, and was a challenger for the Australasian middleweight title against Clive Stewart. His professional fighting weight varied from 70 kg (154 lb), i.e. middleweight, to 74 kg (164 lb), i.e. light heavyweight.

In 2014, Scanlan died in Ranfurly Hospital and Veterans Home, Mount Roskill, and was buried in Waikumete Cemetery.
