= Samuel Goldstein (rabbi) =

Rabbi Samuel Aaron Goldstein
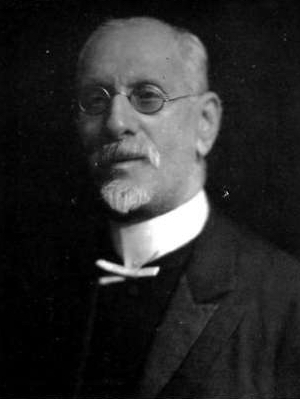

Personal life
- Born: 12 June 1852 London, England
- Died: 29 May 1935 (aged 82) Auckland, New Zealand
- Spouse: Eva Phillips
- Children: 2
- Parents: Woolf Goldstein (father); Sarah Goldstein (mother)
- Education: Jews' College, London

Religious life
- Religion: Judaism

Samuel Aaron Goldstein (12 June 1852 – 29 May 1935) was a New Zealand rabbi, scholar and community leader. A prominent figure in New Zealand's Jewish community, he served as the rabbi of the Auckland Hebrew Congregation for 54 years, and was known for his contributions to Jewish education and interfaith relations.

== Early life ==
Samuel Aaron Goldstein was born in London, England to Woolf and Sarah Goldstein. His father, Woolf Goldstein was a jeweller and has German heritage. Samuel Goldstein received his ordination at the age of 22 following rabbinical training at Jews' College, London. He taught Hebrew at a school in Yorkshire, then at West Hartlepool.

== Career ==
Goldstein first relocated to Australia to serve as the rabbi for the Hebrew congregation in Toowoomba, Queensland, before taking up a position in West Maitland, New South Wales. Goldstein consecrated the Maitland Synagogue in 1879.

In 1880, Goldstein arrived in Auckland on the SS Tararua to serve the Auckland Hebrew Congregation. Under Goldstein's leadership, the congregation expanded from 373 in 1881 to 950 by 1935. During the Long Depression, he voluntarily reduced his annual stipend by £75 to help alleviate the community's financial strain. To supplement his income, he took on cleaning and maintenance duties at the synagogue to support his family.

Goldstein was known for his interest in civic affairs. He served in the New Zealand Society for the Protection of Women and Children, the Society for the Prevention of Cruelty to Animals, and the Auckland Ladies' Benevolent Society. During and after the Second Boer War, he was the secretary of the Patriotic Society. He was also a member of the Auckland City Council's library committee and founded the Societé littéraire française. Goldstein formed friendships with non-Jews, including George Grey, and served on Grey's memorial committee following his death. These friendships stemmed from Goldstein's support of empire; upon the death of Queen Victoria, Goldstein described himself as an English Jew 'with all the instincts and impulses of an Englishman.'

Goldstein was known for his strong views on a range of issues. A committed Zionist, he was the president of the Auckland Zionist Society for 22 years. Goldstein believed that the establishment of a Jewish state would enable the Jewish people to be recognized globally as a legitimate nation rather than marginalised outcasts. Goldstein did not support spousal conversion to Judaism on the basis that Judaism requires the proselyte to believe in the Jewish faith and marital conversion is conversion for other motives.

In 1928, Goldstein was awarded the title Morenu by British Chief Rabbi Joseph Hertz. In 1935, he was awarded the King George V Silver Jubilee Medal. Goldstein retired from active ministry in 1934, having served the congregation for 54 years.

== Personal life ==
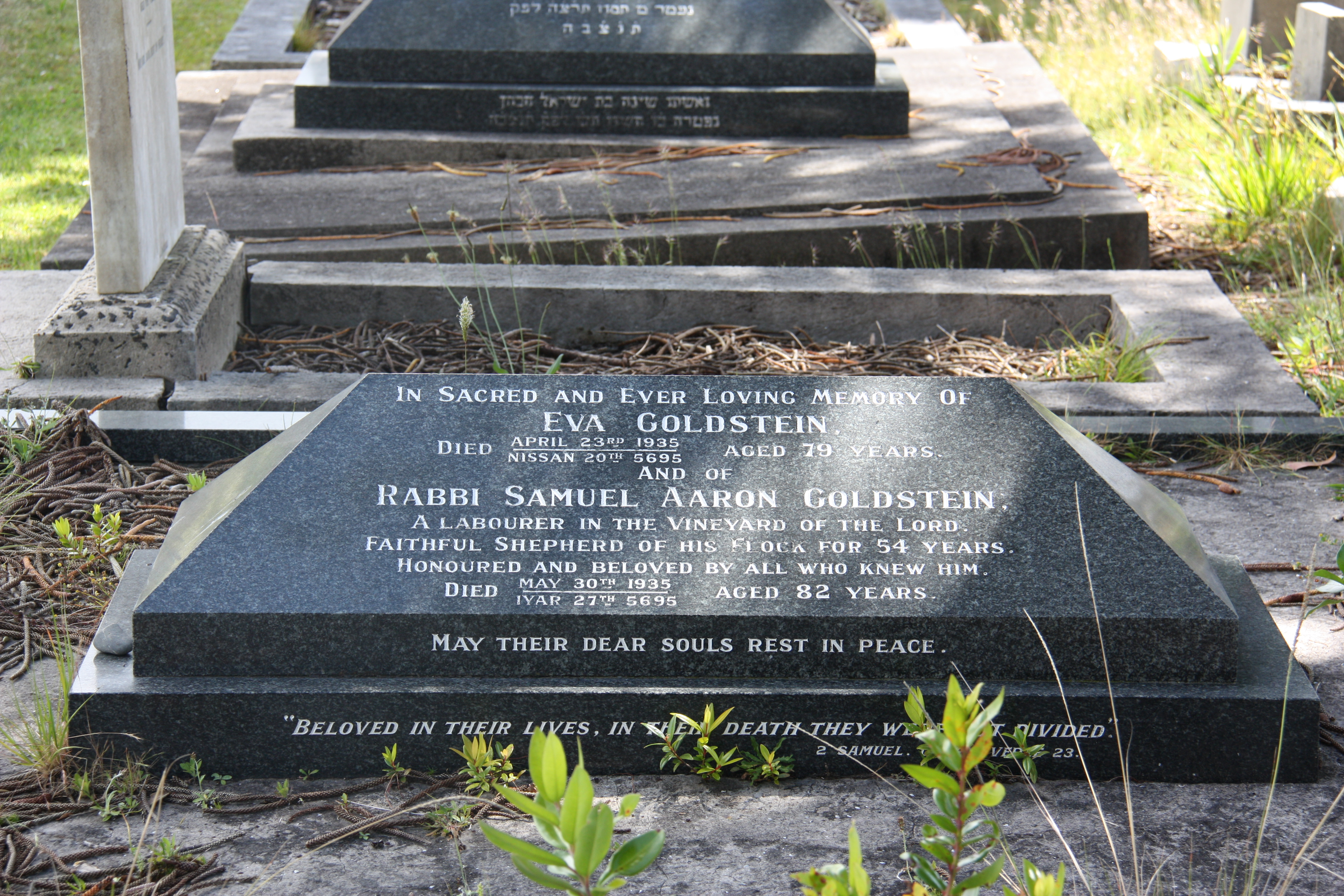
Headstone of Eva and Samuel Goldstein, Waikumete Cemetery

Goldstein married Eva Goldstein, née Phillips, on 14 June 1876 at Southampton, England. Eva died on 23 April 1935 aged 78. They had two sons who were both physicians. His eldest son, Major Herbert Myer Goldstein, served in the New Zealand Medical Corps during World War One and attained the Military Cross. Herbert died in 1954, aged 76. His youngest son, Henry, died of influenza in 1905, aged 23.

Samuel Goldstein died on 30 May 1935, following complications from surgery, aged 82. Goldstein was buried in Waikumete Cemetery in a ceremony conducted by his successor, Rabbi Alexander Astor.
