= Auckland Hebrew Congregation =

Modern Orthodox synagogue in Auckland, New Zealand

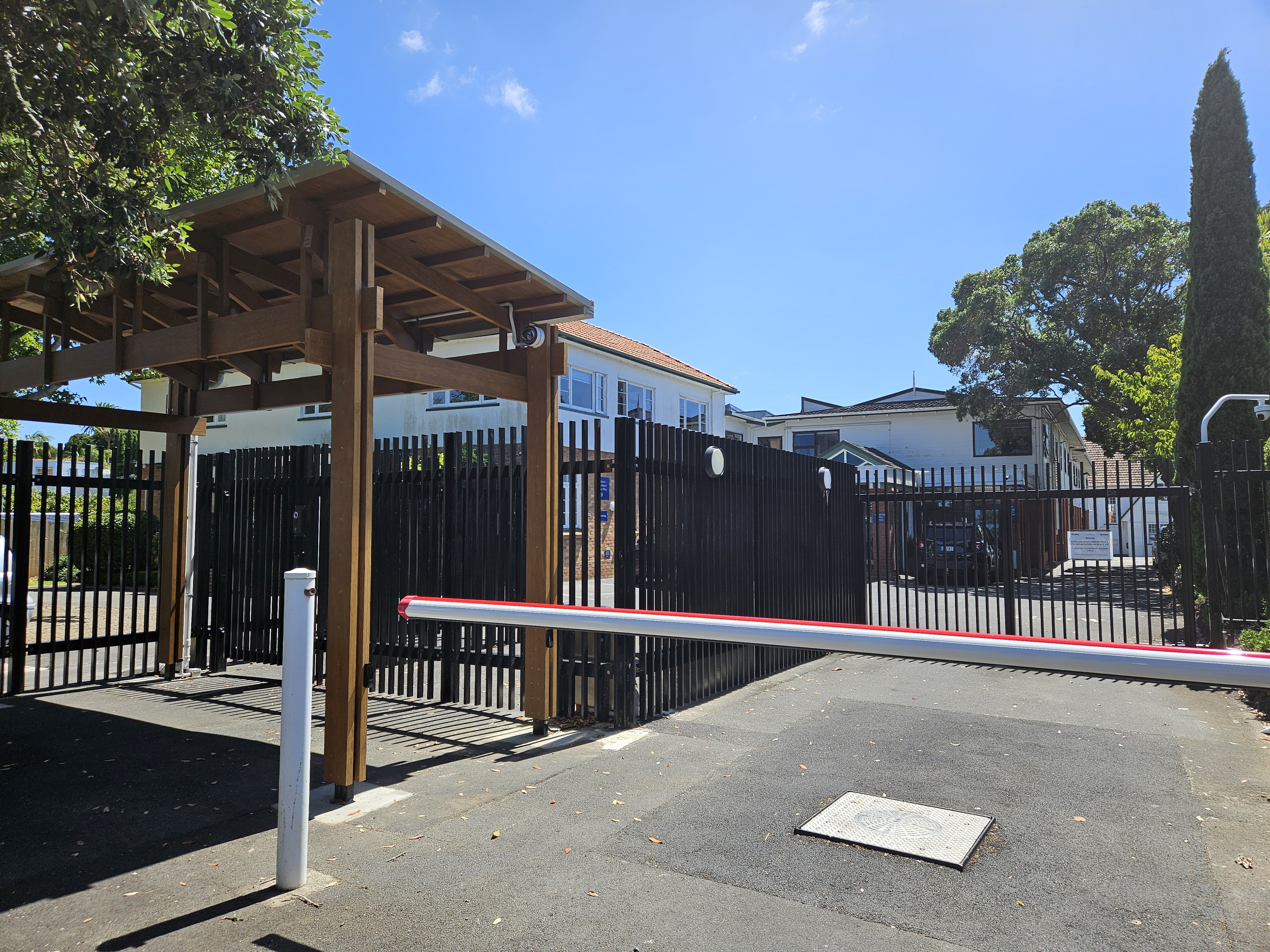
- Entrance to the school and synagogue, on Remuera Road, in 2024

- Location of the synagogue in Auckland

Religion
- Affiliation: Modern Orthodox Judaism
- Ecclesiastical or organisational status: Synagogue
- Leadership: Rabbi Netanel Kaszovitz
- Year consecrated: 1885 (Princes Street); 1968 (Greys Avenue); 2023 (Remuera Road)
- Status: Active

Location
- Location: 514 Remuera Road, Remuera, Auckland
- Country: New Zealand
- Coordinates: 36.8813°S 174.8052°E

Architecture
- Architects: Edward Bartley (1885); John Godwater (1968)
- Type: Synagogue architecture
- Style: Romaneseque Revival (1885); Modernist (1968 and 2023)
- Completed: 1885 (Princes Street); 1968 (Greys Avenue); 2023 (Remuera Road)

Website
- ahc.org.nz

The Auckland Hebrew Congregation is a Modern Orthodox Jewish congregation and synagogue, located at 514 Remuera Road in Remuera, a suburb of Auckland, in the North Island of New Zealand. The congregation was previously located at University House as the Princes Street Synagogue from 1885 before relocating to a larger building on Greys Avenue in 1968. The congregation moved to its current location in 2022, having purchased the former campus of the Saint Kentigern Girls' School on Remuera Road. The synagogue serves around 500 local families.

== History ==
=== Princes Street ===
The original synagogue building on Princes Street was designed and built by Edward Bartley in 1884–1885 in a Romanesque Revival style, incorporating Gothic Revival and Moorish Revival design elements. The foundation stone was laid by David Nathan (1816–1886), an early Jewish settler and founder of the L. D. Nathan chain of stores, and the synagogue opened on 9 November 1885. The building could seat 375 people. It was built on the site of an earlier military guardhouse associated with Albert Barracks. The construction of the synagogue was a statement by the Jewish community in Auckland of their status and their acceptance in the local community. The building has a Category I listing with the New Zealand Historic Places Trust.

In 1968, the congregation moved to a new synagogue on Greys Avenue. Following the deconsecration, ownership of the Princes Street property reverted to Auckland City Council as part of the Albert Park Reserve. It subsequently served as a branch of the National Bank of New Zealand, restored by the bank in 1989, preserving the stained glass windows as well as the Romanesque and Eastern decorative motifs. The building currently serves as the office for the University of Auckland's alumni relations and development department.

=== Greys Avenue ===
As the congregation grew in size, a larger building was needed to meet it needs and a plot was purchased on Greys Avenue, overlooking Myers Park. The former Princes Street synagogue was deconsecrated in 1969. The new inner-city synagogue was consecrated on 8 September 1968. The Greys Avenue building was designed by John Goldwater, a New Zealand Jewish architect, in a Modernist style; and was the recipient of an architectural award in 1970. The synagogue and complex underwent a US$$6.63 million refurbishment in 2008 and John Key, a Jew who later became Prime Minister of New Zealand, attended the reopening. After an earlier ban had been put in place, in 2010 the congregation led a successful challenge against the New Zealand government, to allow shechita. In 2011, Israel's Speaker of the Knesset, Reuven Rivlin addressed the congregation. It marked the first official Israeli state visit to the country in a quarter of a century, since President Chaim Herzog's visit in 1986. The buildings and sanctuary were used for filming by Simone Nathan in her 2022 TV series, Kid Sister. The Greys Avenue complex was also home to Kadimah, the Jewish primary school, Auckland Jewish Immigration and the city's only kosher café.

=== Remuera Road ===
In 2019, with the assistance of the Woolf Fisher Trust, the congregation purchased the campus of Saint Kentigern Girls' School in Remuera. Kadimah relocated from Grey's Avenue to the Remuera campus in 2023. Other Jewish organisations and the Kosher café/deli are also in the process of relocating to the site, creating the main hub for Jewish life in Auckland. The city's Reform congregation, Beth Shalom has also been invited to relocate to the campus. The Auckland Hebrew Congregation plans to build a new sanctuary and synagogue in the future on the grounds of the campus. It currently holds services in the original homestead on the property. The house had been built in 1918 for the Louisson family who, later downsized to a smaller property and sold the home to the Church of Jesus Christ of Latter-day Saints. The property and campus later formed part of Corran School, a private girls school, before becoming Saint Kentigern's Girls' School following a 2009 merger. There are also plans for a mikvah on the site, a cultural centre and provision for Jewish youth groups. In recent decades, the congregation has stepped up efforts to encourage Jewish immigration to New Zealand, mostly focusing on Jewry in South Africa, Argentina and Israel.

== Gallery ==
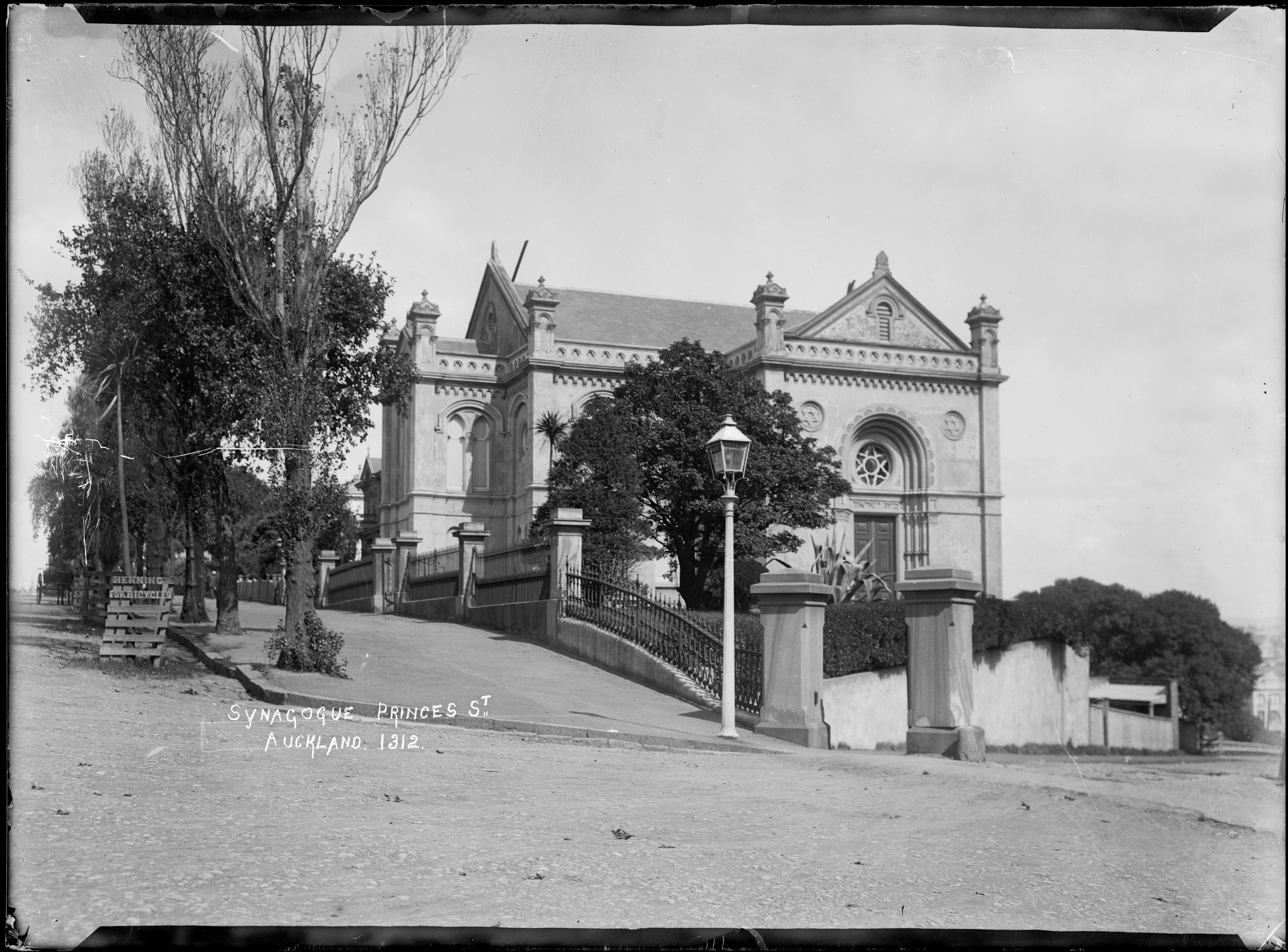
Former Princes Street synagogue in early 1900s

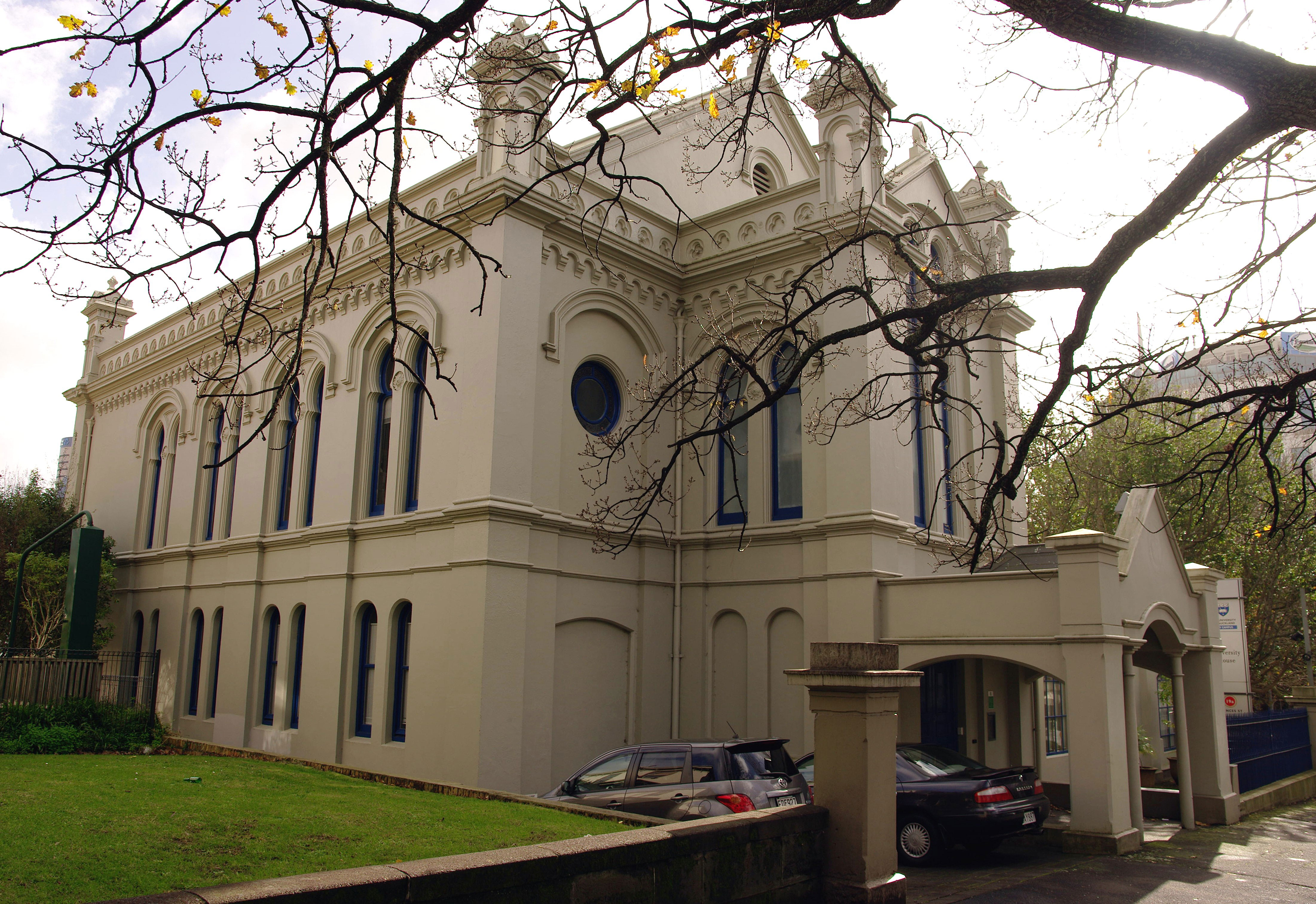
Former Princes Street synagogue, now University House

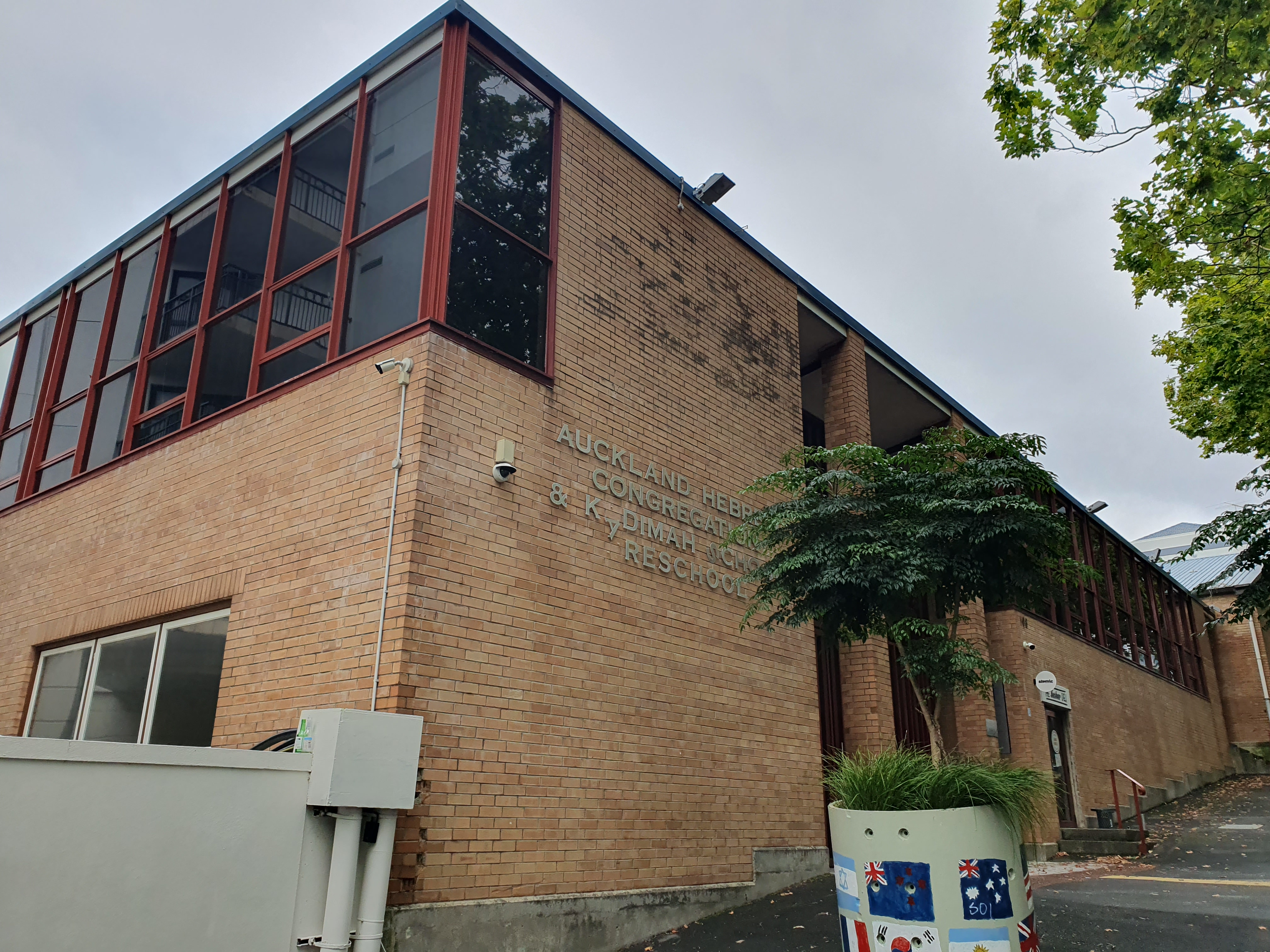
Former Kadimah School and Auckland Hebrew Congregation on Greys Avenue

== See also ==
- History of the Jews in New Zealand
- List of synagogues in New Zealand
