= Solomon Levy (Wellington settler) =

Early Wellington settler

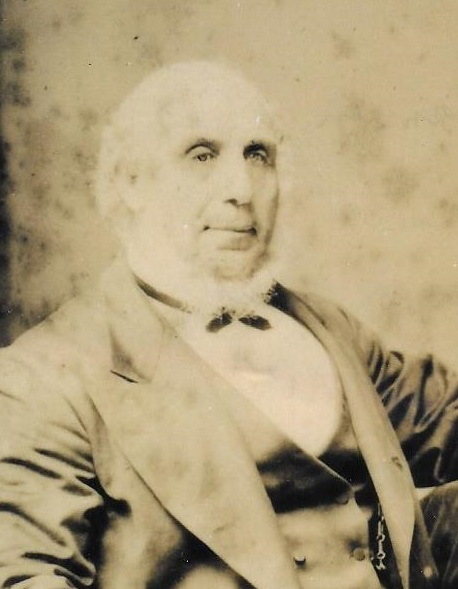
- Born: 16 January 1817; St Pancras, London, England
- Died: 29 October 1883 (aged 66); Blenheim, New Zealand
- Occupation: Rates Collector
- Spouse: Jane Harvey (1833–1883)
- Children: 13
- Relatives: Benjamin Levy (brother)

Solomon Levy (16 January 1817 – 29 October 1883) was an early Wellington settler and one of the first Jewish settlers in New Zealand. He was one of the founding members of Beth El, the first synagogue in Wellington.

== Biography ==
Levy arrived in Wellington on the ship Oriental, which departed from London 15 September 1839 and arrived in Wellington on 31 January 1840. In 1833, Levy married 16 year old Jane Harvey, who arrived in Wellington in 1842. The couple would have thirteen children of which eight survived to adulthood. One of their children, Miriam Ballard, would go on to sign the 1893 women's suffrage petition. The family lived at 26 Brougham Street.

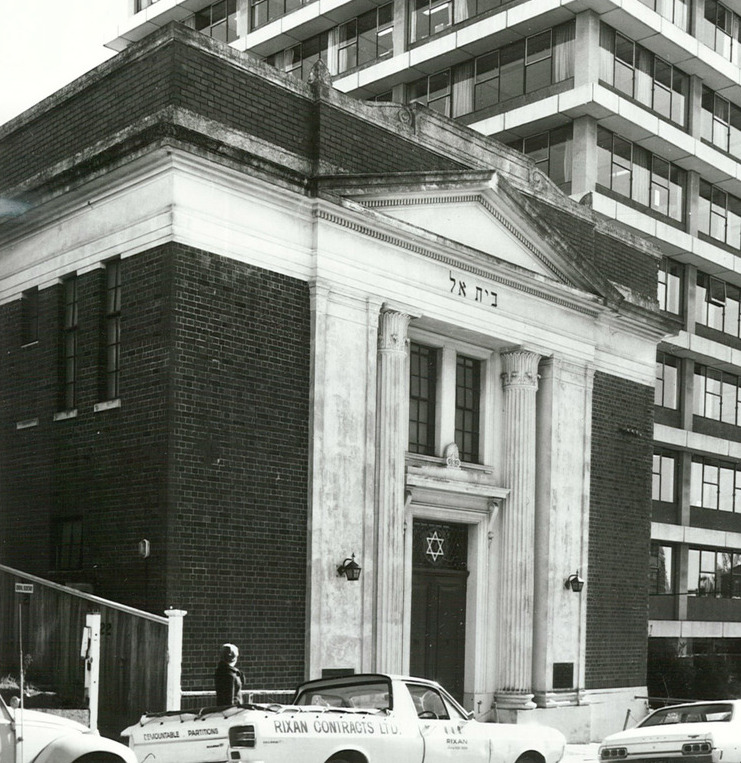
Wellington Synagogue (Beth El Synagogue), which Levy helped found

Levy worked numerous jobs, including as a gold digger, during which he worked in Victoria, Australia. He eventually became a rates collector for the city council, but resigned due to poor health. He was also a trustee of the Brittania Lodge of Oddfellows for roughly 25 years and was also a freemason member.

He was Jewish and could speak in Hebrew, using this skill to teach Hebrew to the Jewish children. Levy was one of the founders of the Beth El synagogue, the first in Wellington, which was opened in 1870.

Leading up to hid death, Levy's was in poor health and was suffering from heart disease. During a trip to Blenheim to visit one of his children, Levy died on 29 October 1883 at the age of 66, being survived by his wife.

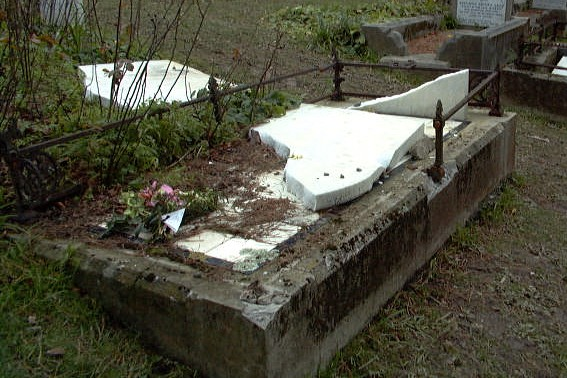
Levy's vandalised grave

== Grave vandalism ==
In July 2004, Levy's grave was one of sixteen historic Jewish graves vandalised in Bolton Street cemetery in Wellington. The graves were smashed and had swastikas spray painted on them in what was considered an antisemitic act. The vandalism came one day after New Zealand imposed sanctions against Israel during the 2004 Israel–New Zealand passport scandal.
