= Edward Bartley =

Architect

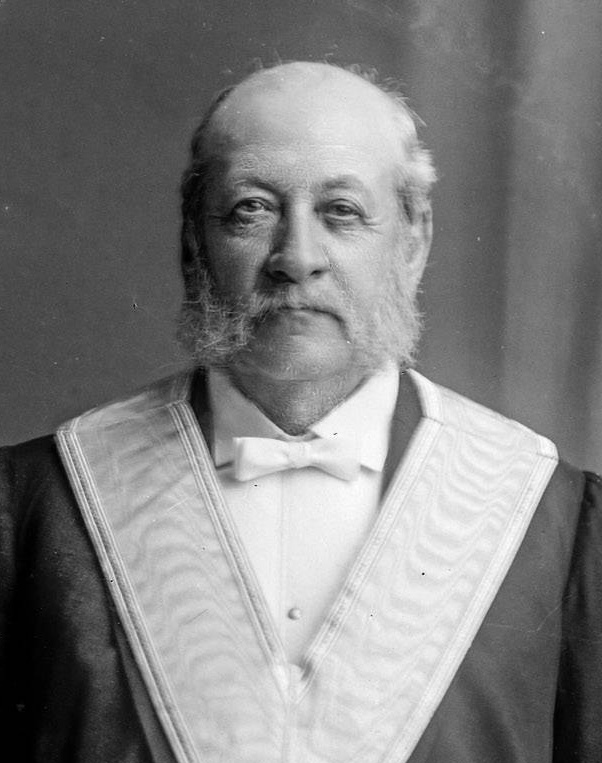
- Born: 23 February 1839; Saint Helier, Jersey, Channel Islands
- Died: 28 May 1919 (aged 80); Auckland, New Zealand
- Resting place: O'Neill's Point Cemetery
- Occupation: Architect
- Spouse: Elizabeth Hannken (m. 1859)
- Children: 13

Edward Bartley (23 February 1839 – 28 May 1919) was a Jersey-born New Zealand architect. Beginning as a builder, Bartley transitioned into a career as an architect, not an uncommon occurrence in the 19th century. He is responsible for designing more than 20 churches and some of Auckland's most notable buildings.

== Life and career ==
=== Early life ===
Bartley was born to Robert Bartley (18 October 1798 – 9 April 1857) and Elizabeth ‘Betsy’ Benest (27 December 1801 – 24 March 1856) in Saint Helier, Jersey, Channel Islands.

The Bartley family lived in a tight-knit community in Saint Helier. They also had family connections on the island of Guernsey, mainland Europe and in the United States. The Bartley family resided in a home in Union Court, St Helier – a short lane running off the north side of Union Street. The family home was designed and built by Edward Bartley's father, Robert Bartley.

Edward Bartley was the tenth child born to his parents. Bartley's parents had twelve children, however, only five would survive through childhood.

The Bartley children were well educated according to standards of the time. Bartley received lessons in drawing, drafting, music, calculation, languages, classics and mathematics. Bartley also acquired a taste for science and technologies which were advancing rapidly at the time. In particular, the advancements made in the development of the microscope, and in photography, were of interest to him all his life.

=== Immigration to New Zealand and career beginnings ===
The Bartley children were well educated, according to the standards of the day. Edward received a solid grounding in drawing, drafting, music and calculation, in addition to the languages, classics and mathematics. He had also acquired a taste for the new science and technologies, which were developing swiftly at that time. In particular the advancements made in the development of the microscope, and in photography, continued to interest him all his life.

Edward Bartley began his career as an apprentice to his father, at the age of thirteen. In this field, he followed his older brother, Robert, who had already qualified as a master builder. After two years, Edward Bartley left Jersey having acquired some work experience and the sale-able skills of building and carpentry. Bartley made the decision to leave Jersey due to the flat local economy which had resulted in no further public building projects.

Bartley's father, Robert, was of an age to retire. He had also contracted tuberculosis, a disease which had already claimed the lives of several family members. In June 1854, Edward Bartley departed from London with his older brother Robert and his family with their sights set on New Zealand. There were a number of destinations available to immigrate to, but the possibility of land grants to approved settlers may have tipped the balance in favour of the Bartley brothers choosing to immigrate to New Zealand. The Auckland local government was keen to attract immigrants and had advertised in the British Isles the opportunity to receive free grants of land in the Auckland area.

Having made their plans to leave Jersey one year prior to their departure, the Bartley brothers would have felt their decision a timely one. In March of that same year, conditions in Europe had begun to deteriorate, leading ultimately to Britain declaring war against the Russian Empire.

Bartley accompanied his brother, Robert, to London – along with them followed Esther Kerby, wife of Robert Bartley, their young children and their possessions. The Bartley brothers set sail for New Zealand on 20 June 1854 aboard the Joseph Fletcher. After a passage of 115 days, the Bartleys reached New Zealand in early October. Auckland in 1854 was no sophisticated port settlement. In the absence of a wharf, the ships anchored midstream. Passengers and goods were transferred to lighters and run ashore on to the beach to disembark. In some weathers this could be a hazardous and nerve-wracking end to a long sea journey, especially so for parents of young children who had been penned up for several months. From the beach, the fortunate acquired drays to transport themselves and their possessions further into the town, the usual disembarking point being approximately the corner of the present day Queen Street and Shortland Streets.

There was an abundance of building work available in Auckland. The primary obstacle in building then was the scarcity of materials. Men with good training, who could easily adapt to colonial methods were desperately needed. Men who were not above dressing their own timber in order to get the job done. It was hard physical work that was waiting to be done and there was plenty of it.

Bartley himself recorded his reminiscences of his first experience of this new environment: "We landed on a Thursday and commenced work on the following Monday, our first employer being A. Black, who was about to erect a building of five two-storey shops on the corner of Queen and Victoria Street East for J.S. McFarlane. We started by placing into position wood blocks for the foundations, after which we proceeded with the wood framework, all of which work was so strange to us as joiners and so vastly different to the employment we had been accustomed to at home. "There were no timber mills and therefore all the boards had to be hand planed and the tongue and groove worked by hand. This was termed 'flogging the boards' and I found it anything but easy work to be constantly employed at from 6 o'clock in the morning until 6 in the evening".

By 1857, Bartley was working with a Mr E.I. Matthews, a retired office of the Royal Engineers Department. In that year, they began work on the Mount Eden Gaol, under the supervision of architect Reader Wood. Bartley noted the extent of freedom allowed to the prisoners laboring on the site and their enterprise, particularly a shoemaker who undertook repairs to the worker's boots, for which payment was lodged with the authorities for collection at the completion of his term of detention.

=== The 1858 Militia Act ===
The 1858 Militia Act had divided the country into military districts and a system of ballot was introduced. Allowances were made, however, for men to substitute service in volunteer companies in satisfaction of their militia duties and a great number did so, enabling a continuation of business and trade while satisfying their obligations to the nation's defence. Edward became a member of the Royal Rifle Company of Volunteers. Establishing himself in steady employment in Auckland as a builder, he married in February, 1859.

The following year was a tumultuous one, both at home and abroad. The first battle of the Taranaki Wars at Waitara took place in March. Tension peaked around the country. By 1861 Governor Browne was still making heavy weather of the crisis in New Zealand. It would be September before Governor Grey arrived in Auckland to take command. By this time the American Civil War was underway and the growing international tensions made it difficult for the Governor to press his case for further resources. While all of this was well reported and debated in Auckland, building work continued steadily. The escalation of war assured it. Even the discovery of gold in Otago had not yet had an economic impact on the town, although wealth and influence were already moving inexorably southwards. In 1862 Edward was now foreman for Mr Matthews and was engaged with his employer in demolishing the original St Paul's Anglican Church in Emily Place. Edward recalled that Colonel Mould of the Royal Engineers was the architect and the design was highly regarded. The colonel was a man of many talents. Active in the Taranaki, he returned to Auckland and set about organising recruitment, as well as supervising the provision of more satisfactory roads, so essential for improving troop movement to the Waikato. Edward now became Orderly-Sergeant of the No 5 Militia.

=== Wreck of Orpheus ===
The next year brought with it a great deal of tension and activity. It was, however, events on the sea, not land, which brought trauma and sadness to the town. Today it is difficult to appreciate the extent of the shock and grieving which affected Auckland when news came of the wreck of HMS Orpheus on 7 February. A subscription was immediately taken up in the town for the relief of personal hardship occasioned by the tragedy and the newspapers of the day gave considerable coverage to the event and its aftermath.

In his memoirs Edward wrote: "I remember the wreck of the HMS Orpheus 7 February 1863, which took place on the Manukau Bar. The first we knew of the affair was by seeing drayloads of sailors being brought into Auckland. Commodore Burnett and 189 officers and men were drowned and for days after the wreck bodies were being washed ashore. Three officers succeeded in reaching the shore on a plank of teak from the wreck, and from this I made for them several mementoes such as picture frames, paper knives ... "

It was over the winter of 1863 that a war mentality began to characterise the Auckland community. Edward was ordered to the front that July, but his active service was short-lived. Eleven tradesmen were required to return to complete the Fort Britomart stores, as capacity was fast being outstripped by demand.

Mr Matthews and Edward, now aged 26, entered into a partnership in 1865 as Matthews and Bartley Builders. It was a difficult time for any new venture. The capital had been removed from Auckland in February, with the attendant loss of personnel and government contracts.

The goldfields of the south continued to pull people away to those areas of the country with more promise of wealth and few "native" concerns. The removal of the bulk of British troops was by now inevitable, no matter how much decried by the Auckland businessmen and speculators. The partnership, however, seemed fortunate in regular contracts. The Wesleyan Church in Pitt Street was one such, being completed and opened in October 1866. The Supreme Court building was another.

=== Professional independence and further pursuits ===
February 1870 saw Edward moving to a greater degree of independence with the lease of offices in Albert Street, on his own behalf. The Auckland Directory of 1873–4 shows that he had moved to Market Place by then, but still as a carpenter and builder. On the evening of 9 April 1870 Edward laid aside commerce to pursue one of his cultural interests at the offices of Henry Partington in Queen Street. The occasion was the inaugural meeting of the Society of Artists. James Baker took the chair for the meeting, at which the following committee was proposed: J Baker, T Warner, T S Hall, T Symons, Dr F Wright, Mr Eastwood and E Bartley. From then on meetings were regularly held, the next occasion using the YMCA premises as a venue, where an annual exhibition was proposed. A sub-committee was formed to organise the forthcoming event, informally styled "the Hanging Committee". The exhibition opened in February 1871. Edward's involvement was to continue for a number of years, both in his capacity as office-holder and as an exhibitor.

By 1871 he had settled in the North Shore district of Devonport. He built his family home, which still stands today, on the corner of Victoria and Calliope Roads. Bartley Terrace, which runs below the house, was named for him. By the early 1880s Edward was working as a designer and architect in his own right. The Auckland Savings Bank building in Queen Street; the Abbott's Opera House; St John's Church Ponsonby; the Jewish synagogue in Princes Street; and the Holy Trinity church in Devonport are just some of his commissions in this period. There was much in the Devonport district to attract his considerable energies, besides his career. Edward shared with other men of his generation a sense of duty to his fellow citizens. Such a philosophy was widely held, not just within his Masonic connections, but also as a virtue of the Victorian attitudes of service and charity to one's community. He served on the Devonport Roads Board from its first meeting in 1883 and progressed from there to the first borough council of Devonport in 1886.

From his earliest days in New Zealand Edward had been a supporter of the "eight-hour day" movement. He was also fully in favour of free, secular and compulsory education. He firmly believed it was the responsibility of the community to provide an opportunity for even the poorest to pass to highest qualification in his chosen trade or profession.

As a member of the Devonport Jubilee Committee he was instrumental in the opening of a new amenity in August 1887. The Devonport Free Reading Room was opened "to provide facilities for acquiring and disseminating literary and scientific knowledge". Edward was to demonstrate his microscope at this venue often, along with lectures and participation in various scientific societies and organisations held in the library or council chambers of an evening. Edward served on the board of the Devonport School for 35 years and it was in a room of that school that he began his technical education classes for the boys of the district in 1891. Many young men were to learn there the skills of joinery, carpentry and technical drawing. In 1895 he broadened his educational interests to wider Auckland, as one of ten who attended a meeting on 2 October 1892 to establish the Auckland Technical School. The first meeting of subscribers was held in 1895 and the school was opened in Rutland Street by Sir Maurice O'Rork on 10 June 1895. This institution continues today as the Auckland University of Technology.

The Auckland Exhibition of 1898 was a marvellous occasion for the city. Edward served on the building committee and experienced further satisfaction from the exhibits. His technical school students collected first-class honours for a number of articles designed and constructed by them. In January 1899, as part of the Exhibition, Edward participated in the "Scientific Conversazione" at the Choral Hall. This evening of science and exploration gathered together over 100 microscopes and assorted instruments for the edification and enjoyment of the public. This extraordinary display was organised by Edward, along with Professor Thomas and Mr Petrie. Edward continued in his career as architect in the new century, serving as vice-president of the Institute of Architects in 1902. In his later years, his sons carried on his contribution to Freemasonry, to the arts and music, and to community service. Bartley's designs can be located all throughout the North Island of New Zealand and his influence extended to the next generation of New Zealand architects, notably Keith Draffin and Gerard Jones.

He worked mainly in Auckland. Notable buildings include:

- Auckland Savings Bank Building, Queen Street, 1881
- St John's Church, Ponsonby Road, 1882
- Jewish synagogue, now University House, Princes Street, 1884
- Costley Home for the Aged Poor, Greenlane, 1889.
- Jubilee Building, Royal Institute for the Blind, Parnell, 1892
- Kings Theatre (now Mercury Theatre), Upper Pitt Street (now Mercury Lane), Newton, 1910
- Mt Eden Public Library, 1912.

All these buildings have Category One New Zealand Historic Places Trust designation

He trained his sons Alfred, Arthur and Frederick in his office. The firm of Bartley & Son continued under Alfred Bartley following the retirement of Edward Bartley in 1914.

== Family ==
On 16 February 1859, he married Elizabeth Hannken at the home of her father in Auckland. She was a daughter of the German settler Frederick Hannken and his wife Eliza (daughter of Count and Countess De Granche). The young couple lived first in Union Street Auckland, on part of the Hannken property. They later moved to The Strand, North Shore at Devonport. Edward's wife Elizabeth was born in Sydney, Australia in October 1838 and came to New Zealand in 1840 with her mother. The Hannken family settled first in the Coromandel, later moving to Auckland. Elizabeth met Edward through the Auckland Choral Society. They were both amongst the foundation members in 1856.

With Elizabeth, he had 13 children. Only 9 of their children would survive through til adulthood:

- Arthur Edward (1859– 1940)
- Frederick Adolphous (1862– 1899)
- Alfred Martin (186?- 1929)
- Matilda Louisa (1867–1868)
- Emily Bertha (1869–1944)
- Harold Edgar (1871– 1872)
- Mabel Theresa (1872–1873)
- Albert Ernest (1873– 1940)
- May Elizabeth (1875– 1951)
- Eva Rosine (1877– 1954)
- Percival Leonard (1878– 1908)
- Amy Zealandia (1879– 1880)
- Claude Victor (1881– 1919)

Edward was the great-uncle of Illustrator Harry Rountree, the son of his niece by his elder brother Robert, Julia Bartley.

== Death ==
Bartley died at his home in Devonport on 28 May 1919, at the age of 80 and was buried at O'Neill's Point Cemetery. His wife Elizabeth would die two years later on 27 December 1921.

His obituary appeared in the Taranaki Daily News on 31 May 1919: "Mr. Edward Bartley, architect, aged 81 years, was found dead in bed on Wednesday. The late Mr. Bartley was born in Jersey, Channel Islands, and was educated there. He received his early training from his father, who was an architect and builder. In 1854 he came to New Zealand in the ship Joseph Fletcher, in company with his elder brother, Mr. Robert Bartley. For the past quarter of a century he had devoted his energies exclusively to architecture, designing and supervising the erection of several of Auckland's most handsome buildings, including the Auckland Savings Bank, the Jewish Synagogue, Opera House, and other noticeable structures. Other noteworthy specimens of the late gentleman's skill and judgment are several city and suburban churches. He was diocesan architect for the Church of England, and was widely experienced in church architecture. The late Mr. Bartley was one of the first members of the Auckland Choral Society, established in 1855, and for fourteen years was choirmaster of the Trinity Church, Devonport, where he had resided for many years. One of his many good works was the establishment of a boys' workshop (in connection with the district school), where for two nights a week for ten years he gave instruction .The workshop took a first award at the Industrial Exhibition in Auckland. The late Mr. Bartley was a devoted lover of science, his scientific use of the microscope having been a hobby for over forty years."
