= University House, Auckland =

Former synagogue in Auckland, New Zealand

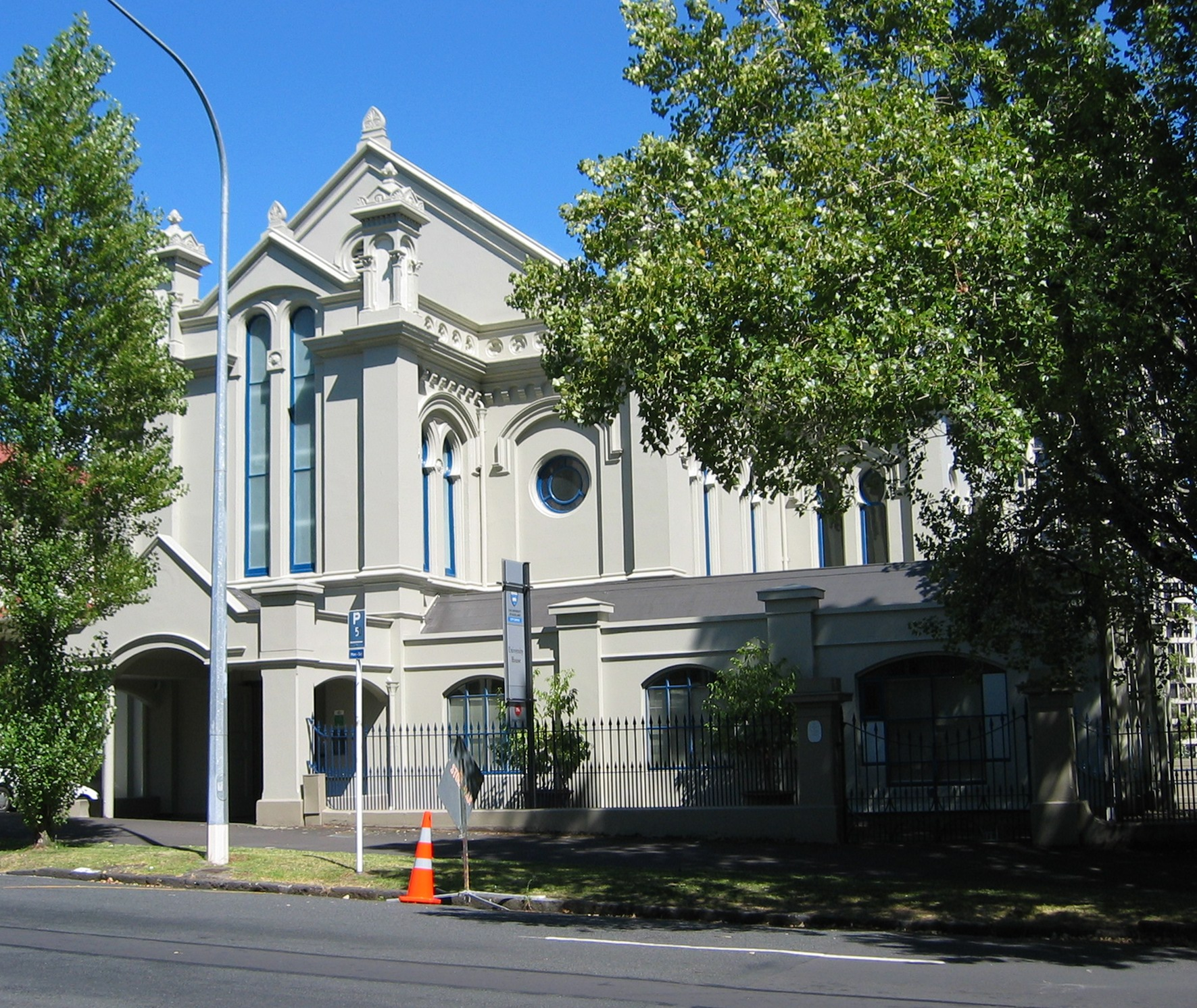
- The Princes Street frontage of the building in 2009
- Former names: Princes Street Synagogue

General information
- Type: Synagogue (1885–1967); Commercial use (1989–2003); University administration (since 2003)
- Architectural style: Moorish Revival
- Location: 19A Princes Street, Auckland, New Zealand
- Coordinates: 36°50′56″S 174°46′09″E
- Current tenants: University of Auckland
- Completed: 1885
- Renovated: 1989
- Client: Auckland Hebrew Congregation (1885)
- Owner: Auckland City Council (since c. 1989)

Design and construction
- Architect: Edward Bartley (1885)

Renovating team
- Architect: Salmond Reed Architects (1989)

Heritage New Zealand – Category 1
- Designated: 27 June 1985
- Reference no.: 578

University House is a 19th-century building in Auckland, New Zealand, that originally served as the synagogue for the Auckland Hebrew Congregation. The building is situated on Princes Street, adjacent to Albert Park, and is now occupied by the University of Auckland.

== History ==
A Jewish community had been present in Auckland since its founding in 1840. The synagogue building was designed and built by Edward Bartley in 1884–1885 in a Romanesque style, incorporating Gothic and Moorish design elements. The foundation stone was laid by David Nathan (1816–1886), an early Jewish settler and founder of the L.D. Nathan chain of stores, and the synagogue opened on 9 November 1885. The building could seat 375 people. It was built on the site of an earlier military guardhouse associated with Albert Barracks. In 1967 the congregation moved to larger premises on Greys Avenue, overlooking Myers Park, and the Princes Street synagogue was deconsecrated in 1969. The construction of the synagogue was a statement by the Jewish community in Auckland of not only status, but of their acceptance in the local community.

In 1967, the congregation moved to a new premises on Greys Avenue. Ownership of the property reverted to Auckland City Council as part of the Albert Park Reserve following the deconsecration. The building was left vacant and deteriorated over the next two decades, until it was carefully restored under the direction of Salmond Reed Architects in 1989 to serve as a branch of the National Bank. The University of Auckland has leased it since 2003, and it now houses the University's Alumni Relations and Development department (formerly called External Relations).

The building is listed by Heritage New Zealand as a Category I Historic Place.
