= David Nathan (merchant) =

New Zealand Jewish settler (1816–1886)

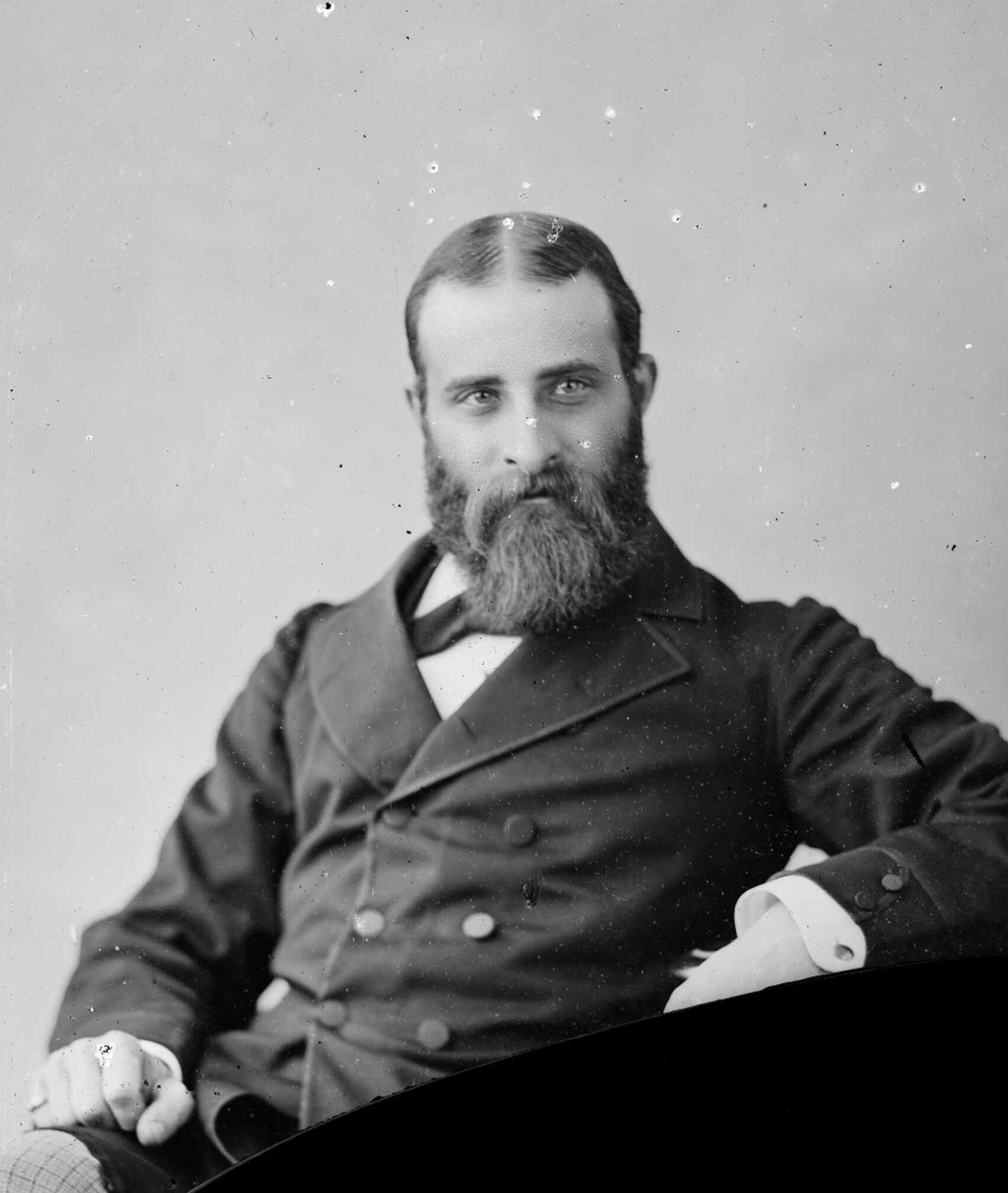
- David Nathan, c. 1861
- Born: 1816; London, England
- Died: 23 August 1886 (aged 69–70); Auckland, New Zealand
- Occupation: shopkeeper
- Spouse: Rosetta Aarons

David Nathan (1816–1886) was one of the first Jewish settlers in New Zealand and became an early colonial shopkeeper there. His marriage to Rosetta Aarons in 1841 was the first Jewish service held in New Zealand.

== Biography ==
Born in London, Nathan migrated first to Australia in December 1839 and then for New Zealand on the Achilles, leaving Sydney for the Bay of Islands in February 1840. He set up a store, first in Kororāreka (present day Russell), then in Auckland when it became the capital in place of Okiato (Old Russell) in the Bay of Islands. On 31 October 1841 he married Rosetta Aarons, the widow of Captain Michael Aarons.

In 1843, with fellow early settler John Israel Montefiore, he secured a grant of land on the corner of Karangahape Road and Symonds Street for a Jewish section of the Symonds Street Cemetery, Auckland.

As his business prospered, he traded in kauri gum and tea and operated a bond store. He was a founder member of the Auckland Chamber of Commerce, established in 1856, and president in 1868. He was a trustee of the Auckland Savings Bank from 1864 to 1885 and vice president from 1878 to 1882, was an early commissioner for the port of Auckland, and served on the city council in 1854–55. He set up L.D. Nathan and Company for his sons, Laurence David Nathan and Nathan Alfred Nathan, just before he retired from business in 1868.

Nathan served four terms as president of the Auckland Hebrew Congregation, between 1853 and 1883, and in 1884 laid the foundation stone of the synagogue on the corner of Princes Street and Bowen Avenue.

Nathan died at his home, which he had built in 1863 in Waterloo Quadrant, Auckland City, on 23 August 1886. He was posthumously inducted into the New Zealand Business Hall of Fame in 2017.

== See also ==
- History of the Jews in New Zealand
