= 2002 TV Guide NZ Television Awards =

New Zealand television awards ceremony

- Awarded for: Excellence in New Zealand television
- Sponsored by: TV Guide
- Date: 29 June 2002
- Location: Auckland
- Country: New Zealand
- Presented by: New Zealand Academy of Film and Television Arts

The 2002 TV Guide NZ Television Awards were staged on Saturday 29 June 2002 in Auckland, New Zealand. Honouring excellence in New Zealand television for the previous year, the awards were sponsored by New Zealand TV Guide magazine, the final year of its eight-year period as a naming-rights sponsor of the awards. As there had been no awards in 2001, the 2002 awards also covered the 2001 awards period. The awards ceremony was not broadcast on television.

== Nominees and winners ==
Awards were given in 37 categories, including two people's choice awards – Best New Programme and Best Presenter.

Best Children's Programme

- Coke Smokefree Rockquest, Richard Hansen (Screentime-Communicado)
  - jessie.com, Janine Morrell (Whitebait Productions)
  - Pukana, Nicole Hoey & Matai Smith (Cinco Cine Film Productions)

Best Documentary

- 1951, John Bates (Bates Productions)
  - Big, Philippa Mossman (Greenstone Pictures)
  - Numero Bruno, Nicola Saker (La Hood Productions)

Best Drama Programme

- Fish Skin Suit, Larry Parr & Julian Arahanga (Kahukura Productions)
  - Clare, Dave Gibson (Gibson Group)
  - Staunch, William Grieve & Keith Hunter (Hunter Productions)

Best Drama Series or Serial

- Being Eve, Vanessa Alexander (South Pacific Pictures)
  - Mercy Peak, John Laing (South Pacific Pictures)
  - Street Legal, Chris Hampson (ScreenWorks)

Best Entertainment Programme

- What Now? 20th Anniversary Special, Tony Palmer (TVNZ)
  - 2001 Montana Wearable Art Awards, Ron Pledger (TVNZ)
  - Pacifica Beats 2000, Greg Mayor (TVNZ)

Best Entertainment Series

- Polyfest 2001, Claudette Hauiti (Front of the Box Productions)
  - A Game of Two-Halves, Nick Tapper (Touchdown Television)
  - Mo Show, Mark Williams & Otis Frizzell (XSTV)

Best Documentary Series

- Captain's Log, Gresham Bradley & John A. Givins (Livingstone Productions)
  - The Big Art Trip, Janice Finn (Screentime-Communicado)
  - Pioneer House, Miranda Grace (Touchdown Television)

Best Factual Series

- Country Calendar, Frank Torley/Country Calendar Production Team (TVNZ)
  - Babies, Bettina Hollings & Bronwen Stewart (Imagination Television)
  - It's Your Money, Derek Stuart (Touchdown Television)

Best Lifestyle Series

- Travel.co.nz, Tash Christie (Screentime-Communicado)
  - Mitre 10 DIY Rescue, Julie Christie (Touchdown Television)
  - Taste New Zealand, Leonie Mansor & Chris Wright (TVNZ)

Best Comedy Programme

- Spin Doctors, Tony Holden (Comedia Pictures)
  - An Audience with the King, Mike King & Eric Derks (At Least Ya Havin' A Go)
  - Willy Nilly, Judith Trye & John Gilbert (Big House)
  - Xena: Warrior Princess "Lyre Lyre Hearts on Fire", Chloe Smith & Robert Tapert (Pacific Renaissance Pictures)

Best Sports Programme

- Fight For Life, John McDonald (TV3)
  - Shell Helix Motorsport – V8 Supercars Pukekohe, David Turner & Stephen Coates (TVNZ – One Sports)
  - Fisher & Paykel Series Netball NZ vs Australia, Stephen Coates (TVNZ – One Sports)

Best Maori Programme

- Whanau, Tumanako Productions & Greenstone Pictures
  - Someone Else's Child, Rhonda Kite (Kiwa Productions)
  - The Truth About Maori, Rhonda Kite (Kiwa Productions)

Best Maori Language Programme

- He Tohunga Whakairo, Toby Mills for Tawera Productions & Moana Maniapoto for Black Pearl Productions)
  - Ahorangi 2000, Derek Wooster (TVNZ)
  - Ahorangi Ruamano, Maria Amoamo & Paora Maxwell (Te Aratai Productions)

Best Actress

- Mamaengaroa Kerr-Bell, Staunch (Hunter Productions)
  - Robyn Malcolm, Clare (Gibson Group)
  - Sara Wiseman, Mercy Peak (South Pacific Pictures)

Best Actor

- Tamati Te Nohotu, Staunch (Hunter Productions)
  - Jay Laga'aia, Street Legal (ScreenWorks)
  - Jeffrey Thomas, Mercy Peak (South Pacific Pictures)

Best Supporting Actress

- Alison Bruce, Mercy Peak (South Pacific Pictures)
  - Jan Fisher, Mercy Peak (South Pacific Pictures)
  - Madeleine Sami, Fish Skin Suit (Kahukura Productions)

Best Supporting Actor

- Tim Balme, Mercy Peak (South Pacific Pictures)
  - Stuart Devenie, Jack of All Trades "Croquey in the Pokey" (Pacific Renaissance Pictures)
  - John Katipa, Staunch (Hunter Productions)

Best Juvenile Actor/Actress

- Rose McIver, Xena: Warrior Princess – Little Problems (Pacific Renaissance Pictures)
  - Rachel Batty, Fish Skin Suit (Kahukura Productions)
  - Luke Tarei, Fish Skin Suit (Kahukura Productions)

Best Entertainment/Comedy Performance

- Sean Duffy, Willy Nilly (Big House)
  - Mark Hadlow, Willy Nilly (Big House)
  - Mike King, An Audience with the King (At Least Ya Havin' A Go)

Best Script Drama Programme

- Toa Fraser & Keith Hunter, Staunch (Hunter Productions)
  - Briar Grace Smith, Fish Skin Suit (Kahukura Productions)

Best Script, Drama Series

- Gavin Strawhan, Mercy Peak (South Pacific Pictures)
  - Maxine Fleming, Being Eve (South Pacific Pictures)
  - Greg McGee, Street Legal (ScreenWorks)

Best Script, Comedy

- Ken Duncum, Mike Smith, Cal Wilson, Paul Yates, Willy Nilly (Big House)
  - James Griffin, Roger Hall, Tom Scott, Spin Doctors (Comedia Pictures)

Best Director, Drama

- Keith Hunter, Staunch (Hunter Productions)
  - Geoff Cawthorn, Mercy Peak (South Pacific Pictures)
  - Yvonne MacKay, Clare (Gibson Group)

Best Director, Comedy

- Mike Smith, Willy Nilly (Big House)
  - Jason Gunn, jessie.com (Whitebait Productions)
  - Tony Holden, Spin Doctors (Comedia Pictures)

Best Director, Documentary

- John Bates, 1951 (Bates Productions)
  - Steve La Hood, Numero Bruno (La Hood Productions)
  - Fiona Samuel, Virginity (Murmur Films)

Best Director, Factual/Entertainment Programme

- Bryan Bruce, Wild About New Zealand (Red Sky)
  - Nigel Carpenter, Big Comedy Gala (Phoenix Television)
  - Mike Ritchie, What Now? 20th Anniversary Special (TVNZ)

Best Camera, Drama

- James Cowley, Fish Skin Suit (Kahukura Productions)
  - Simon Baumfield, Street Legal (ScreenWorks)
  - John Cavill, Xena: Warrior Princess "Lyre Lyre Hearts on Fire" (Pacific Renaissance Pictures)

Best Camera, Non-Drama

- Peter Young, Country Calendar (TVNZ)
  - Swami Hansa, Kiwi Buddha (Spacific Films)
  - Steven Orsbourn, Tuaman – Destiny in My Hands (Oxygen Productions)

Best Editing, Drama

- Tim Woodhouse, Staunch (Hunter Productions)
  - Allanah Milne, Mercy Peak (South Pacific Pictures)
  - Paul Sutorius, Clare (Gibson Group)

Best Editing, Non-Drama

- Peter Roberts, God, Sreenu and Me (MF Films)
  - Geoff Conway, Numero Bruno (La Hood Productions)
  - Ollie Tira'a, Polyfest 2001 (Front of the Box Productions)

Best Original Music

- Carl Doy, Buzz and Poppy (Huhu Enterprises)
  - Joel Haines, Mercy Peak (South Pacific Pictures)
  - Joost Langeveld & Victoria Kelly, Being Eve (South Pacific Pictures)

Best Contribution to a Soundtrack

- Suite 16, Carl Smith, Being Eve (South Pacific Pictures)
  - Chris Burt, Cleopatra 2525 "Pod Whisperer" (Pacific Renaissance Pictures)
  - Suite 16, Neil Newcombe, Carl Smith and Travis Hefferen, Mercy Peak (South Pacific Pictures)

Best Production Design

- Robert Gillies, Jack of All Trades – Shark Bait (Pacific Renaissance Pictures)
  - Robert Gillies, Xena: Warrior Princess "Devi" (Pacific Renaissance Pictures)
  - Brett Schwieters, Mercy Peak (South Pacific Pictures)

Best Costume Design

- Janet Dunn, Clare (Gibson Group)
  - Jane Holland, Cleopatra 2525 "Run Cleo Run" (Pacific Renaissance Pictures)
  - Jane Holland, Jack of All Trades "It's A Mad, Mad, Mad, Opera" (Pacific Renaissance Pictures)

Best Contribution to Design

- Zane Holmes, Being Eve (South Pacific Pictures)
  - Larry Justice, Street Legal (ScreenWorks)
  - George Port, Cleopatra 2525 "Pod Whisperer" (Pacific Renaissance Pictures)

=== People's choice ===
Best Presenter

- Judy Bailey, One Network News
  - John Campbell, TV3 News
  - Mike Hosking, Breakfast News
  - Maggie Barry, Maggie's Garden Show
  - Stacey Daniels, Mai Time
  - Peter Elliot, Captain's Log
  - Jason Fa'afoi, What Now
  - Mikey Havoc, Havoc Luxury Suites & Conference Facility
  - Kate Hawkesby, Breakfast
  - Carol Hirschfeld, 3 News
  - Paul Holmes, Holmes
  - Richard Long, One Network News
  - Peta Mathias, Taste NZ
  - Alison Mau, Home Front
  - Carolyn Robinson, 3 News

Best New Programme (people's choice)

- Mitre 10 DIY Rescue, Julie Christie (Touchdown Television)
  - Mercy Peak, John Laing (South Pacific Pictures)
  - Travel.co.nz, Tash Christie (Screentime Communicado)
  - Babies (Imagination Television)
  - Being Eve (South Pacific Pictures)
  - Captain's Log (Livingstone Productions)
  - Havoc Luxury Suites & Conference Facility (TVNZ)
  - Mercury Lane (Greenstone Productions)
  - Mo Show (Level One)
  - The Panel (Screentime-Communicado)
  - Pioneer House (Touchdown Television)
  - Quest For Success (Jump Productions)
  - Spin Doctors (Comedia Pictures)
  - The Weakest Link (Touchdown Television)
  - Willy Nilly (Big House)
