= 2003 New Zealand Television Awards =

- Awarded for: Excellence in New Zealand television
- Sponsored by: New Zealand Trade and Enterprise
- Date: 22 August 2003
- Location: Auckland
- Country: New Zealand
- Presented by: New Zealand Academy of Film and Television Arts
- Hosted by: Jason Gunn

Television/radio coverage
- Network: ONE

The 2003 New Zealand Television Awards was staged on Friday 22 August 2003 in Auckland, New Zealand. Honouring excellence in New Zealand television for the previous year, the awards ceremony was hosted by TV presenter Jason Gunn and was sponsored by the newly established government agency New Zealand Trade and Enterprise. Highlights of the event were later broadcast on TV ONE. This was to be the final awards organised by the New Zealand Academy of Film and Television Arts. No awards were held in 2004, with the New Zealand Television Broadcasters Council organising the new Qantas Television Awards in 2005.

== Winners ==
Awards in 36 categories were given, including two people's choice awards – Best New Programme and Best Presenter.

Best Documentary

- No Mean Feat, Chas Toogood (Chas Toogood Productions)

Best Episode of a Drama Series or Serial

- Street Legal, Chris Hampson (ScreenWorks)

Best Drama Series or Serial

- Street Legal, Chris Hampson (ScreenWorks)

Best Entertainment Programme

- Westfield Style Pasifika, Julie Smith and Stan Wolfgramm (Drum Productions)

Best Entertainment Series

- Mo Show, Mo Show – Iain Eggleton (XSTV)

Best Documentary Series

- 2050 What if... New Zealand Becomes a State of Australia?, Dan Salmon, Bruce Morrison, Cass Avery & Jude Callen (Screentime Communicado)

Best Factual Series

- Queer Nation, Andrew Whiteside (Livingstone Productions)

Best Lifestyle Series

- The Living Room, Sticky Pictures

Best Comedy Programme

- Spin Doctors, series 3, Tony Holden (Comedia Pictures)

Best Sports Programme

- Shell Helix Motorsport – NZ V8 Round, David Turner (TVNZ Sports)

Best Mäori Programme

- Syd Jackson – Life & Times of a Maori Activist, Toby Mills & Moana Maniapoto (Tawera Productions & Black Pearl Productions)

Best Mäori Language Programme

- Sciascia, (Maui Productions)

Best New Programme (People's Choice)

- The Strip, series 1, Dave Gibson (Gibson Group)

Best Actress

- Street Legal, Katherine Kennard (ScreenWorks)

Best Actor

- Mercy Peak, Jeffrey Thomas (South Pacific Pictures)

Best Supporting Actress

- Mercy Peak, Alison Bruce (South Pacific Pictures)

Best Supporting Actor

- Street Legal, Charles Mesure (ScreenWorks)

Best Juvenile Actor/Actress

- The Strip, series 1, Renee Elwood (Gibson Group)

Best Entertainment/Comedy Performance

- Spin Doctors, series 3, Elizabeth Hawthorne (Comedia Pictures)

Best Presenter (People's Choice)

- 3 News, John Campbell (TV3)

Best Script, Single Episode of a Drama Series or Serial

- The Strip, series 1, Paula Boock & Kathryn Burnett (Gibson Group)

Best Script, Comedy

- Spin Doctors, series 3 , Roger Hall, James Griffin, Dave Armstrong (Comedia Pictures)

Best Narration Script, Non-Drama

- The Lost Dinosaurs of New Zealand, Bryan Bruce & Ian Johnstone (Red Sky Film & Television)

Best Director, Drama

- Mataku, Peter Burger (South Pacific Pictures)

Best Director, Documentary

- 2050 What if... Mäori Gain Sovereignty – Tino Rangitiratanga?, Dan Salmon (Screentime Communicado)

Best Director, Factual/Entertainment Programme

- The Living Room, Mark Albiston (Sticky Pictures)

Best Camera, Drama

- Street Legal, Fred Renata (ScreenWorks)

Best Camera, Non-Drama

- Mercury Lane, series 1, Rewa Harre (Greenstone Pictures)

Best Editing, Drama

- Mataku, Allannah Milne (South Pacific Pictures)

Best Editing, Non-Drama

- 2050 What if... New Zealand Becomes a State of Australia?, Bryan Shaw (Screentime Communicado)

Best Original Music

- Street Legal, Don McGlashan (ScreenWorks)

Best Contribution to a Soundtrack

- Mataku, Lloyd Canham & Nick Buckton (South Pacific Pictures)

Best Production Design

- Mataku, Miro Harre (South Pacific Pictures)

Best Costume Design

- The Dress Up Box, Karol London (Papageno Productions)

Best Contribution to Design

- Willy Nilly, Catriona Campbell (Big House)

Lifetime Achievement Award in Broadcasting

- Marcia Russell
