= 2000 TV Guide Television Awards =

New Zealand television awards

2000 TV Guide New Zealand Television Awards
- Awarded for: Excellence in New Zealand television
- Sponsored by: TV Guide
- Date: 11 November 2000
- Location: Aotea Centre, Auckland
- Country: New Zealand
- Presented by: New Zealand Academy of Film and Television Arts

The 2000 TV Guide NZ Television Awards were staged on Saturday 11 November 2000 at the Aotea Centre in Auckland, New Zealand. Honouring excellence in New Zealand television for the previous year, the awards were sponsored by New Zealand TV Guide magazine.

== Nominees and winners ==
Awards were given in 28 categories. Due to a lack of eligible entries, there were no nominees or winner in the Best One-off Drama category.

Best children's programme

- What Now?
  - Suzy's World
  - Pukana

Best documentary

- The Fatal Game
  - Return to Romania
  - He Rau Aroha

Best drama series or serial

- Duggan
  - Shortland Street

Best entertainment programme

- The $20 Challenge "London"
  - Style Magazine Fashion Collection

Best entertainment series

- Polyfest 2000
  - Havoc & Newsboy's Sell-out Tour
  - Ice As

Best factual series

- Our People Our Century
  - Legends of the All Blacks
  - Coming Home

Best lifestyle series

- Backch@t
  - Maggie's Garden Show
  - Corbans Taste New Zealand

Best comedy programme

- Pulp Comedy
  - Havoc 2000 Deluxe

Best news and current affairs programme

- 60 Minutes
  - 20/20
  - 3 News

Best sports programme

- America's Cup, The Final Day
  - On Tour with the All Black Army
  - ALAC Sports Awards of New Zealand

Best Maori language programme

- Moko Toa
  - Waka Huia

Best Maori programme

- Nga Morehu End of an Era
  - It's Cool to Korero
  - Nga Tohu: Signatures

Best actress

- Nancy Brunning, Nga Tohu: Signatures
  - Geraldine Brophy, Shortland Street
  - Nicola Kawana, Jacksons Wharf

Best actor

- George Henare, Nga Tohu: Signatures
  - John Bach, Duggan "Shadow of Doubt"
  - Patrick Toomey, Jacksons Wharf

Best supporting actress

- Stephanie Tauevihi, Shortland Street
  - Michele Amas, Duggan "Food to Die For"
  - Nicole Whippy, Jacksons Wharf

Best supporting actor

- Ross Duncan, Nga Tohu: Signatures
  - Blair Strang, Shortland Street

Best performance in an entertainment or comedy programme

- Jon Bridges, Ice As
  - Mikey Havoc and Newsboy, Havoc and Newsboy's Sell-out Tour
  - Madeleine Sami, Ice As

Best presenter

- John Campbell
  - Jim Hickey
  - Judy Bailey

Best drama script

- Donna Malane, Duggan "Workshop for Murder"
  - Judy Callingham, Duggan "Shadow of Doubt"

Best factual programme or documentary script

- Philip Temple, Our People Our Century "Families at War"
  - Bryan Bruce, Ian Johnstone, The Trouble with Ben
  - Keith Quinn, Colin McRae, John Keir, Legends of the All Blacks

Best director, drama

- Andrew Bancroft, Nga Tohu: Signatures
  - Justine Simei-Barton, Matou Uma
  - Yvonne Mackay, Duggan "Shadow of Doubt"

Best director, factual programme or documentary

- Cheryl Cameron, Destination Disaster: Sinking of the Mikhail Lermontov
  - Megan Jones, Return to Romania
  - John Milligan, Shipwreck

Best camera

- Peter Young, Country Calendar "Yankee Harvest"
  - Leon Narbey, Duggan "Shadow of Doubt"
  - Camera Team, America's Cup

Best editing

- Paul Sutorius, Getting to our Place
  - Bryan Shaw, Return to Romania
  - Paul Sutorius, Duggan "Shadow of Doubt"

Best original music

- Clive Cockburn, Destination Disaster
  - Gareth Farr, Duggan "Shadow of Doubt"
  - Felicity Williams, Dress Up Box

Best contribution to a soundtrack

- Haresh Bhana, America's Cup
  - Ian Leslie, Our People Our Century

Best design

- Guy Moana, Moko Toa
  - Catriona Campbell, Baby Proms
  - Ned Wenlock, Wired

Best contribution to design

- Paul Sharp, Virtual Spectator Animation America's Cup
  - Brad Mill, Art Direction, The Tribe
