= Scared Scriptless =

Scared Scriptless could refer to:

- A late-night improvised comedy show by the Court Jesters staged at the Court Theatre in Christchurch, New Zealand since 1990
- Scared Scriptless Improv, an improvisational comedy troupe in Anchorage, Alaska
- The popular student-run improv group at Saint Olaf College
