= Foreskin's Lament =

1980 play by Greg McGee

Foreskin's Lament is a play by New Zealand playwright Greg McGee, first performed in 1980.

== Plot ==
The play is a drama set in a rugby union changing room after a practice, and at an after-match party. The captain is kicked in the head off-stage at the beginning of the first act, and again during the game between acts, by his own teammate and the play's antagonist, Clean. He dies in hospital during the second act. The play ends with Foreskin directly addressing the audience in a monologue filled with rugby allusions, questioning their own values, ending with the repeated question, "Whaddarya?"

== History ==
The play was initially workshopped at the New Zealand Playwrights' Conference in Wellington in 1980. It was produced immediately before and during the social unrest of the 1981 Springbok Tour of New Zealand. It was named Best New Zealand Play of 1981.

Downstage Theatre Company put on two productions, on 1985 and in 1995 with some of the original cast reprising their roles.

The script was updated after the 1981 tour and was later revised by the author for filming as Skin and Bones.

Eleanor Bishop created an adaption of the play called Boys that premiered with the Auckland Theatre Company in 2017 and was performed at the Court Theatre (Christchurch) in 2021. The first part is a presentation of Act 1, the second part is a commentary on this by young women and the third part is a deconstructed presentation of the third act of Foreskin's Lament.

== Analysis ==
The play is set in 1976, and looks forward to the 1981 Springbok Tour. Some have suggested that the ironically named character "Clean" is based on the New Zealand Prime Minister, Rob Muldoon. It has been described as the "definitive denunciation of redneck rugby culture".
