= Mark Hadlow =

Australian-New Zealand actor and comedian

Mark Hadlow ONZM
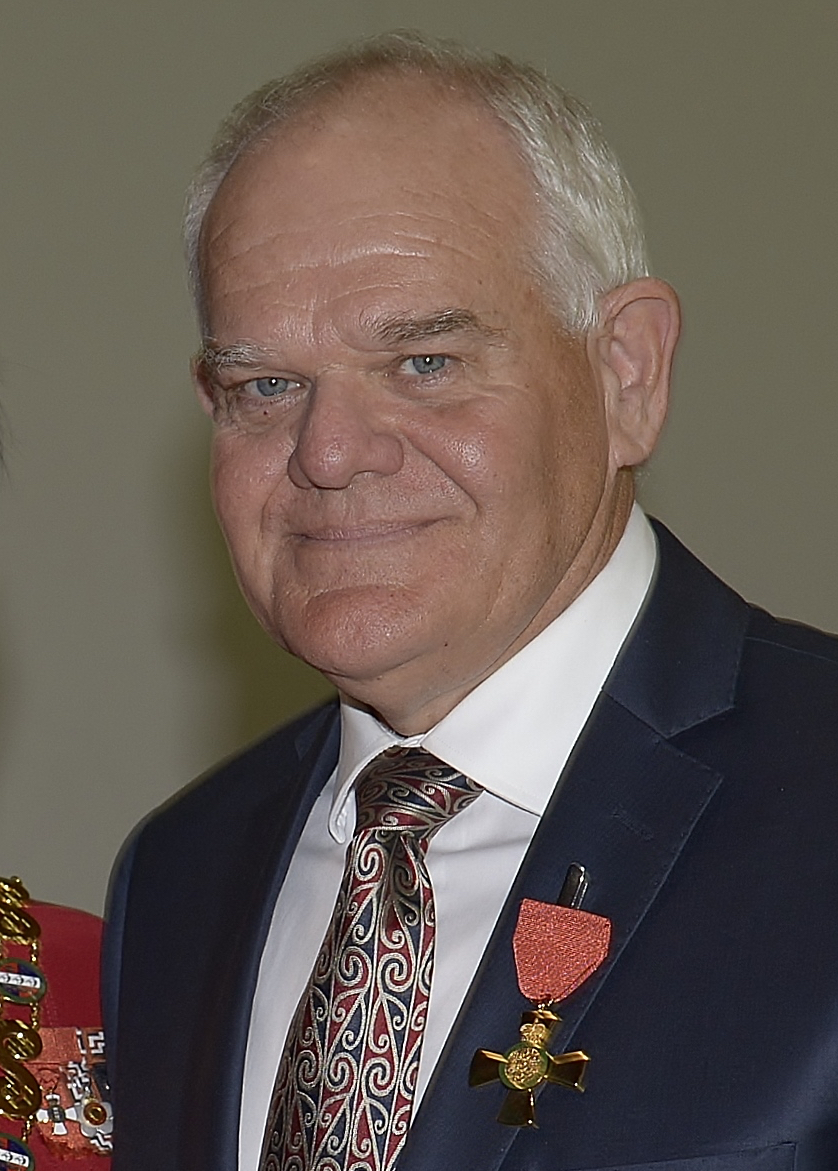
- Hadlow in 2018
- Born: Mark Selwyn Hadlow; 1957 (age 68–69); Walgett, New South Wales, Australia
- Occupation: Actor
- Years active: 1979–present

Mark Selwyn Hadlow ONZM (born 1957) is a New Zealand actor and comedian, perhaps best known internationally for playing the roles of Harry in King Kong and Dori, a dwarf, in The Hobbit series.

== Early life ==
Hadlow was born in Australia, in the New South Wales town of Walgett, the son of a New Zealand-born vicar and an Australian mother. They moved to Perth, and then spent three years in Chennai, before moving to New Zealand when Hadlow was nine years old. They lived in Wellington and Christchurch, and Hadlow attended boarding school.

== Career ==
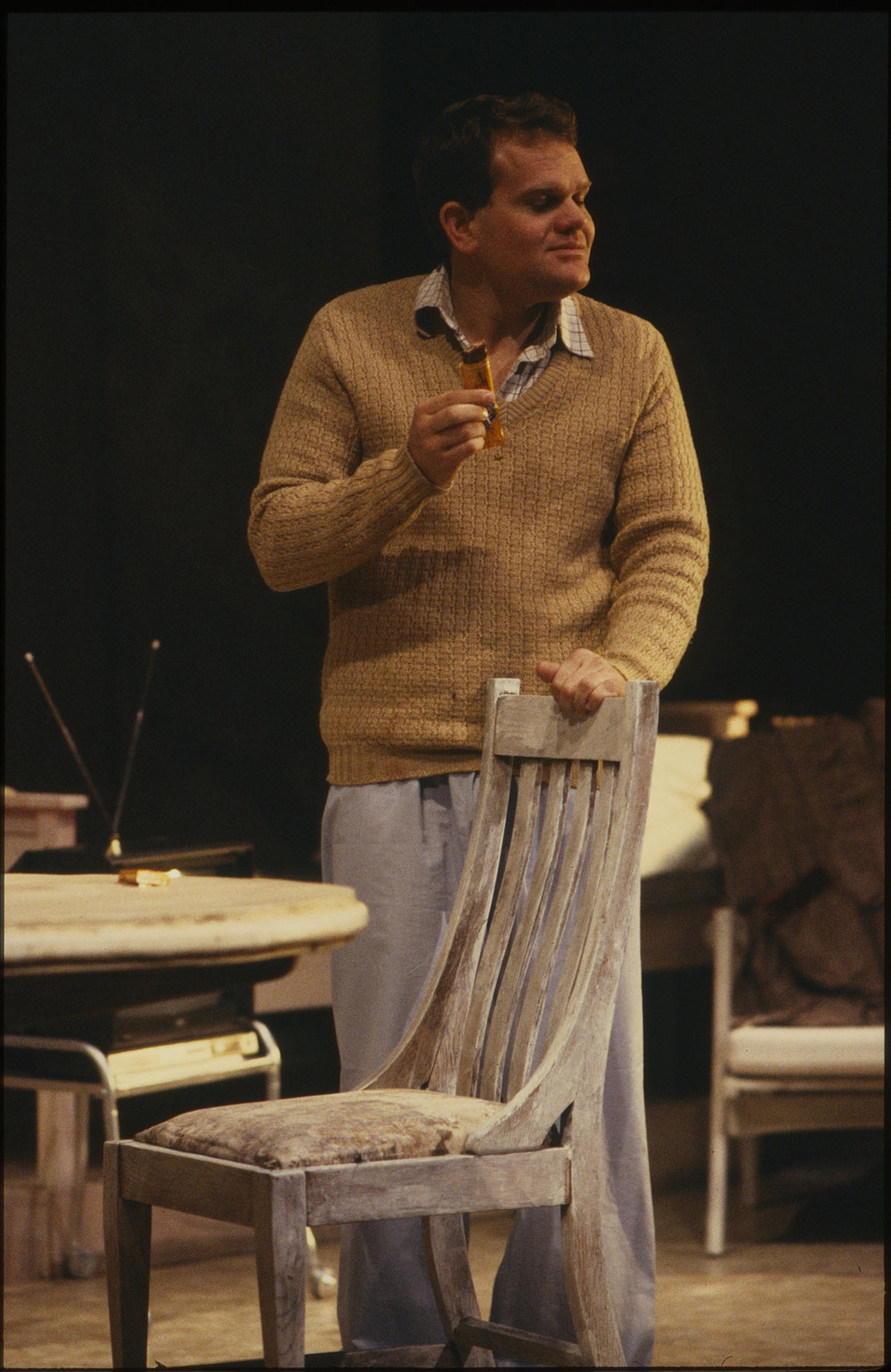
Mark Hadlow in "Gulls" at Downstage Theatre (1988)

Hadlow's early film appearances were in serious roles, such as in Beyond Reasonable Doubt, but he is perhaps better known in New Zealand for his comedy roles, particularly in the television sitcom Willy Nilly, and some of the voices for the 1989 Peter Jackson puppet film, Meet the Feebles (including Heidi the hippo and Robert the hedgehog). He also starred alongside New Zealand Māori comedian, Billy T James in "The Billy T James Show".

Hadlow has also released an audio CD called "Tall Tales". It consists of classic children's stories narrated and performed with a Kiwi twist.

Between films and television, Hadlow works in Christchurch's Court Theatre, where he has directed, produced, and acted in many plays. Hadlow is known for interacting with the audience whenever possible. This was made easy in the theatre's intimate, 200-seat setting, where the audience was literally next to the stage.

In 2009, Hadlow campaigned for the historic Odeon Theatre in Christchurch to be turned into an arts complex for an estimated NZ$60m. The earthquake-prone building was severely damaged in the February 2011 Christchurch earthquake, and later in 2012, the rear of the building was demolished.

While appearing in a one-man play, he met his ex-wife. They met in the audience before the start of the play because Hadlow always started off in the audience. In his wife's words, "this nice man who I didn't recognise sat next to me and we started chatting. Within minutes he knew a lot about me. Suddenly he got up and started acting in the play."

In 2021 he appeared on TV as Brian in "The Garotte and the Vinkelbraun", an episode of The Brokenwood Mysteries, Series 7 No 25.

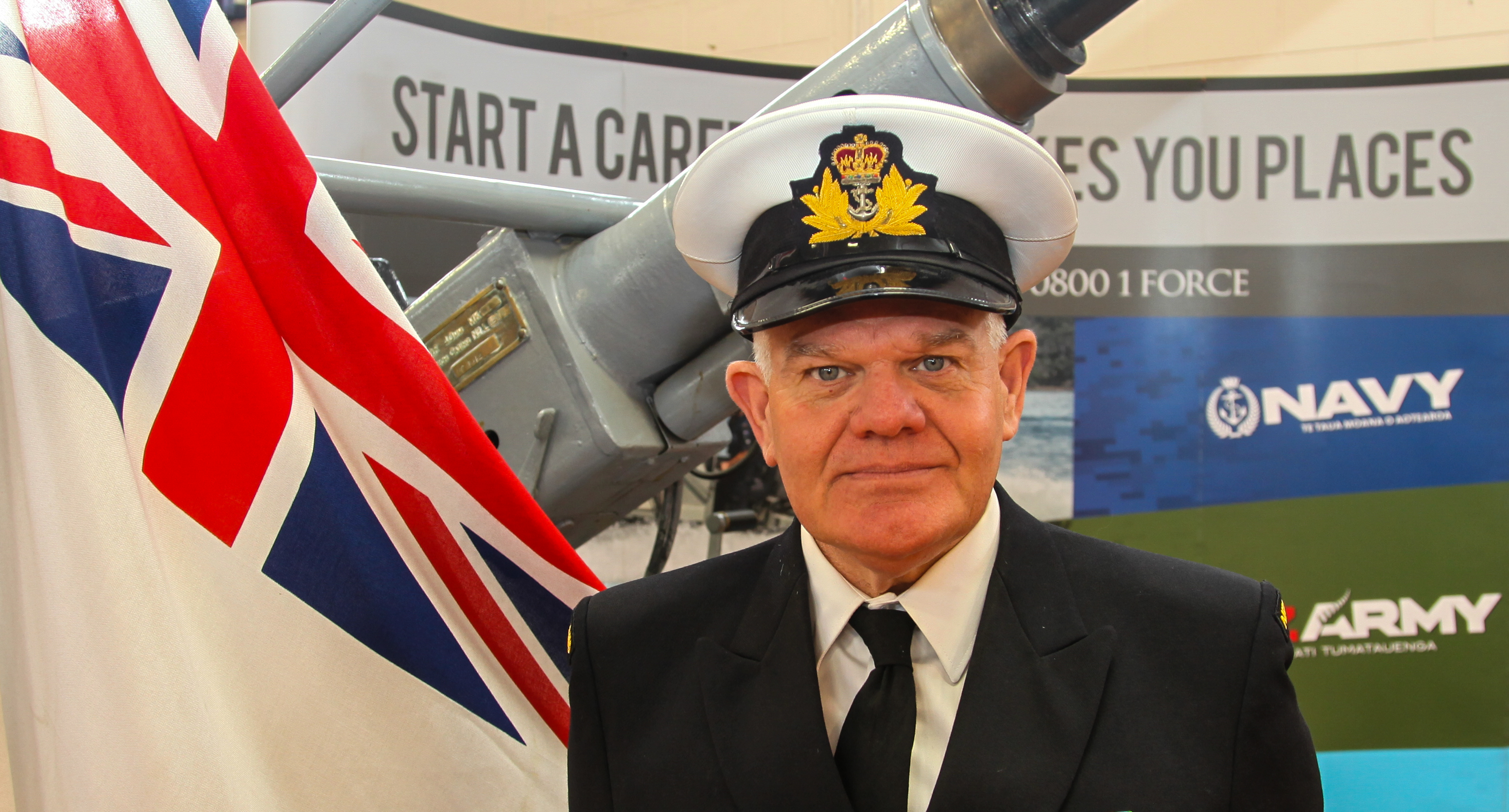
Hadlow at HMNZS Pegasus, 2016

In addition to his acting career, Hadlow is a commissioned lieutenant commander in the Royal New Zealand Naval Volunteer Reserve.

In the 2017 Queen's Birthday Honours, Hadlow was appointed an Officer of the New Zealand Order of Merit for services to the arts.

In 2022 he was presented with a Scroll of Honour from the Variety Artists Club of New Zealand for his contribution to New Zealand entertainment.

== Filmography ==
=== Films ===
Year	Film	Role
1980	Beyond Reasonable Doubt	Bruce Roddick
1981	Strange Behavior	Dancer at Party
1982	Battletruck	Orrin
1982	Klynham Summer	Sam Finn
1983	Nate and Hayes	Gun Operator
1984	Constance	Errol's Friend
1988	Just Me and Mario	Kevin Stiles
1989	Meet the Feebles	Heidi the Hippo, Robert the Hedgehog, Barry the Bulldog (voices)
1992	Absent Without Leave	Prison Corporal
1995	Bonjour Timothy	Rugby's Coach
2005	King Kong	Harry
2006	The Waimate Conspiracy	Mr. Glue QC
2008	Last of the Living	Dad
2009	No Petrol, No Diesel!	Mr. Bligh
2010	The Holy Roller	Wally
2012	The Hobbit: An Unexpected Journey	Dori; Bert (voice)
2013	The Hobbit: The Desolation of Smaug	Dori
2014	The Hobbit: The Battle of the Five Armies	Dori
2018	Mortal Engines	Orme Wreyland
2023	Darkest Light	David King
2026	Deep Water	Coach Dade
