= Eleanor Bishop =

Eleanor Bishop may refer to:

- Eleanor Bishop (comics), a Marvel Comics character
  - Eleanor Bishop (Marvel Cinematic Universe), the Marvel Cinematic Universe counterpart of the character
- Eleanor Bishop, a fictional character in the TV series NCIS
- Eleanor Bishop (director), New Zealand stage director, producer and playwright
- Eleanor Zoe Bishop, a character in the television series Heroes
