= Carl Nixon =

New Zealand author

- Born: 1967 (age 58–59); Christchurch, New Zealand
- Education: University of Canterbury
- Occupations: Novelist; short story writer; playwright
- Years active: 1990–present
- Awards: Sunday Star-Times Short Story Competition 1997; Katherine Mansfield Menton Fellowship 2017

Carl Nixon (born 1967) is a New Zealand novelist, short story writer and playwright. He has written five novels and a number of original plays which have been performed throughout New Zealand, as well as adapting both Lloyd Jones' novel The Book of Fame and Nobel prize winner J. M. Coetzee's Disgrace for the stage.

== Early life and career ==
Nixon was born and grew up in Christchurch, New Zealand. He attended St Andrew's College. He has said that he had remedial reading lessons as a child and "didn't really get into books until I was ten or so". In 1992, Nixon graduated with a master's degree in religious studies from the University of Canterbury. His thesis was entitled For they shall be comforted : an examination of the liturgy, usage and adequacy of the funeral service in A New Zealand prayer book (1989) with reference to the grief of the bereaved. He briefly taught secondary school English before leaving to teach in Japan for two years.

Nixon was one of the founding members of The Court Jesters, an improvisation troupe at the Court Theatre in Christchurch, in 1989. He began his writing career writing children's plays for the Court Theatre. He also wrote a young adult novel, Guardians of Mother Earth, published in December 1996.

== Literary career ==
Nixon began writing for adults in 1997, and won the Sunday Star-Times Short Story Competition, for "My Father Running with a Dead Boy" in 1997 (his first short story) and "Weight" in 1999. He was a runner up in the Bank of New Zealand Katherine Mansfield Short Story Competition in 1999 and won the premier prize in 2007. His first collection of short stories, the best-selling Fish 'n' Chip Shop Song (Random House, 2006), was short-listed in the Best First Book Southeast Asia and South Pacific Region category in the Commonwealth Writers' Prize 2007.

Nixon was the Ursula Bethell/Creative New Zealand Writer in Residence at the University of Canterbury in 2007, where he completed his first novel, Rocking Horse Road (Random House, 2007). Reviewing Rocking Horse Road in North & South in August 2007, Warwick Roger said Nixon "gets the style and timbre of teenagers just right" and had "fulfilled the promise he showed" in his first book. Nixon subsequently published two further novels, Settlers' Creek (Random House, 2010) and The Virgin and the Whale (Random House, 2013). In 2010/2011 he was the recipient of the NZSA Peter & Dianne Beatson Fellowship. Nixon's first three novels have been translated into German and published by Weidle Verlag in Bonn, Germany. The Virgin and the Whale was titled Lucky Newman in the German translation.

Nixon has written a number of original plays including Mathew, Mark, Luke and Joanne, The Birthday Boy and The Raft, which have been performed throughout New Zealand. His play The Raft (2007) was adapted for Radio New Zealand and won Best Dramatic Production 2009 at the 2009 New Zealand Radio Awards. He has also adapted Lloyd Jones' novel The Book of Fame and Nobel prize winner J. M. Coetzee's novel Disgrace for the stage. In 2020 he received the McNaughton South Island Play Award at the Adam NZ Play Awards for the best play written by a South Island resident.

In 2017 Nixon was the recipient of the Katherine Mansfield Menton Fellowship, one of New Zealand's most prestigious literary fellowships. He spent around three months in 2018 living and writing in Menton, France at the Villa Isola Bella, where Katherine Mansfield herself lived and worked, and was able to complete the first draft of his next novel, The Tally Stick. This novel was published in August 2020. It was well received by critics, with journalist Philip Matthews describing it as "an efficient, gripping story, a Kiwi Gothic thriller that is confidently and economically told", and Erin Harrington in The Spinoff describing it as "taut and well-plotted, balancing a mounting sense of dread with unexpected payoffs, and dancing across two parallel storylines". It was shortlisted for the 2021 Best Novel prize at the Ngaio Marsh Awards.

His fifth novel, The Waters, was published in August 2023. It is a collection of 21 interlinked stories set in New Brighton; a review in Newsroom describes the stories as "beautifully crafted and compelling, like holding up a prism and seeing the many ways the light refracts".

== Personal life ==
As of 2020 Nixon lived in Christchurch. He is married with two children.

== Selected works ==
=== Novels ===
- Rocking Horse Road (2007)
- Settlers' Creek (2010)
- The Virgin and the Whale (2013)
- The Tally Stick (2020)
- The Waters (2023)

=== Short story collections ===
- Fish 'n' Chip Shop Song (2006)

=== Plays ===
- The Complete History of New Zealand (Abridged) (co-written with Greg Cooper and Craig Cooper, first performed in 1998 at the Court Theatre)
- Kiwifruits: A New Zealand Fairy Tale (co-written with Craig Cooper, first performed in 1999 at the Court Theatre)
- Crumpy - The Life and Times of Barry Crump (first performed in 2000 at the Court Theatre)
- The Book of Fame (adapted from Lloyd Jones' novel The Book of Fame)
- Disgrace (adapted from J. M. Coetzee's novel Disgrace, and first performed in 2005 by the Auckland Theatre Company)
- The Raft (first performed in 2007 at the Court Theatre)
- The Birthday Boy (first performed in 2008 at the Court Theatre)
- Two Fish 'n' a Scoop (first performed in 2010 at the Court Theatre)
- The War Artist (first performed in 2015 at the Centrepoint Theatre, Palmerston North)
- Mathew, Mark, Luke and Joanne (first performed in 2016 at the Court Theatre)
