= TV Guide (disambiguation) =

TV Guide is an American digital media company

TV Guide may also refer to:

== Television ==
- TV Guide Magazine, an American magazine
- TV Guide (Canada), a Canadian magazine
- TV Guide (New Zealand), a New Zealand magazine

== See also ==
- Pop (American TV channel), a television channel formerly known as the TV Guide Channel and TV Guide Network
- Electronic program guide, a menu containing scheduled television programs and events, also known as TV guides
- TV listings, a printed or electronic timetable of television programs also referred to as a TV guide
