= Katrina Hobbs =

New Zealand actress (born 1971)

- Born: 3 September 1971 (age 55); New Zealand
- Occupations: Actress; interior designer
- Years active: 1989–present
- Notable work: Home and Away (1995–1997)

Katrina Hobbs (born 3 September 1971) is a New Zealand actress and interior designer. She is best known for her role as Kelly Watson on the Australian soap opera Home and Away, for which she was nominated for the Logie Award for Most Popular New Talent.

== Early life ==
Hobbs' was born to director, producer and writer Aileen O'Sullivan. She has six siblings. Two brothers, Chris and Tom, and a sister, Rebecca, are also actors. Her sister, Jessica, is a director. She is of Irish and Scottish descent.

== Career ==
Early in her career, Hobbs would appear in television series, such as, the short-lived Betty's Bunch, which featured Maggie Kirkpatrick, and The Boy from Andromeda, in a leading role. Following several television guest appearances, Hobbs was cast in her first film in 1992, in Absent Without Leave, alongside Craig McLachlan.

In 1995, Hobbs joined the cast of Australian television soap opera Home and Away, as Dr. Kelly Watson, the most notable role of her career, which earned her a 1996 Logie Award nomination for Most Popular New Talent at the 38th Annual TV Week Logie Awards in 1996. Her character was involved in several controversial storylines, including, a kidnapping, and a HIV scare in the 1995 season finale. She departed the series in 1997, after a two-year run.

Her television work has consisted of numerous guest appearances on shows, such as, Hercules: The Legendary Journeys, Xena: Warrior Princess, All Saints, Shortland Street, Street Legal, Rake, Ash vs Evil Dead and The Brokenwood Mysteries. In 2022, Hobbs returned to Shortland Street in the recurring role of Liz Griffiths.

In 2011, Hobbs relocated from Auckland to Sydney where she enrolled at Sydney School of Design, where she trained as an interior designer. This led to the creation of her own business, Hobbs & Co. established in 2015.

== Filmography ==
Film
| Year | Title | Role | Notes |
|---|---|---|---|
| 1992 | Absent Without Leave | Daisy Edwards | |
| 1992 | Revelations | Janet | Short |
| 2001 | Her Majesty | Jennifer | |
| 2008 | Show of Hands | Jennifer | |

Television
| Year | Title | Role | Notes |
|---|---|---|---|
| 1990 | Betty's Bunch | Samantha | Season 1, episode 5 |
| 1991 | The Boy from Andromeda | Jenny | Season 1, episode 3 |
| 1993 | Shortland Street | Brenda Garrett | Season 2, episodes 291 & 292 |
| 1994 | Hercules in the Maze of the Minotaur | Lover Girl | TV movie |
| 1994 | Pathways | Emma | Season 1, episode 1 |
| 1994 | Marlin Bay | Melanie | Season 3, episode 11 |
| 1995 | Hercules: The Legendary Journeys | Marysa | Season 1, episode 4 |
| 1995 | Cover Story | Jacqueline Reid | Season 1, episode 1 |
| 1995–97 | Home and Away | Kelly Watson | Seasons 8–10 (main role, 189 episodes) |
| 1997 | Xena: Warrior Princess | Glaphyra | Season 3, episode 3 |
| 1998 | Cody: The Wrong Stuff | Female Dealer | TV movie |
| 1999 | All Saints | Lily Vale | Season 2 (recurring, 5 episodes) |
| 1999 | Shortland Street | Janet Maxwell | Season 8, episodes 211 & 214 |
| 2001 | Street Legal | Melissa York | |
| 2001 | Willy Nilly | Chantelle | |
| 2002 | Superfire | Kathy | TV movie |
| 2012 | Tricky Business | Wendy James | Season 1, episode 12 |
| 2012 | Rake | Sally | Season 2, episode 2 |
| 2018 | Ash vs Evil Dead | Candace Barr | Season 3, episodes 1, 3 & 9 |
| 2021 | The Brokenwood Mysteries | Jennifer Furroughs | Season 7, episode 1 |
| 2022 | Shortland Street | Liz Griffiths | Season 31 (recurring, 7 episodes) |
