= Bryan Bruce =

New Zealand documentary maker and author

Bryan Bruce (born 1948) is a New Zealand documentary maker and author.

== Early life ==
Born in Edinburgh, Scotland, Bryan Bruce emigrated with his family to New Zealand in 1956. He grew up in Christchurch and attended the University of Canterbury, where he graduated with an M.A. in Sociology and Philosophy. Bruce earned a Diploma in Teaching from Christchurch Teachers' College and taught for ten years.

== Career ==
He was a professional musician for 20 years before he took up a career as a documentary maker. While moonlighting as a bar pianist, a chance meeting with Dunedin Producer, Ross Johnson, led him to hosting and writing scripts for the TV series The Late Late Show in 1982. Presenter Ian Johnstone, accepted Bruce's proposal for We’re Only Human, a pop-psychology program which ran for two successful seasons on TV2, followed by Just Testing. In the mid to late 1980s, TVNZ’s documentary department dissolved, but launched Bruce's career as an independent filmmaker. He partnered with New Zealand’s Department of Health to write and present Safer Sex, an educational documentary dealing with sex in New Zealand in the age of AIDS. He then decided to follow New Zealand yachtsman Peter Blake as he competed and won the 1989 Whitbread Round the World race, and sold the documentary internationally.

Under his company banner, Red Sky Film & TV, Bryan Bruce is involved in most, if not all aspects of the documentary production, including writing, producing, directing, editing and often presenting. Often, he travels around the world to see how other people and systems operate to help provide perspective on the documentary topic.

Bruce's feature-length documentaries cover diverse topics, from natural history, biography, psychology, sociology, social justice, mental health and crime. Over his career, Bruce has written, produced and/or directed 30+ documentaries and docudramas. In addition to many one-off documentaries, Bruce also wrote, produced and directed the real crime show series, The Investigator that debuted on TVNZ1 and CBS Reality in 2007. The second series in 2009 won a Qantas Award for Bruce’s directing, and sold to a number of overseas channels.

== Publications ==
Bruce's published non-fiction works include the following:

- A Taste of History (Batemans, 2007; ISBN 978-1-86953-614-5)
- Hard cases (Random House, New Zealand, 2008; ISBN 978-1-86941-977-6)
- Historia Smaku (Cartablanca, 2000); ISBN 978-83-61444-63-3
- Jesus: The Cold Case (Random House, New Zealand, 2010); ISBN 978-1-86979-197-1
- Jezus: Dowody Zbrodni (Cartablanca, Poland, 2011); ISBN 978-83-7705-043-9

== Awards ==
- 2024 New York Festivals® TV & Film Awards. Winner, Silver Medal (The Food Crisis)
- 2023 New York Festivals® TV & Film Awards. Winner, Silver Medal (Inside Child Poverty Revisited)
- 2023 New Zealand Television Awards. Finalist, NZ On Air Best Documentary (Inside Child Poverty Revisited)
- 2015 New York Festivals® TV & Film Awards. Winner, Silver Medal (Passion in Paradise)
- 2014 New York Festivals® TV & Film Awards. Winner, Gold Medal (Mind The Gap)
- 2012 New Zealand Television Awards. Nominated, Best Director - Documentary (Inside Child Poverty). Nominated, Best Popular Documentary (with Richard Thomas) (Inside Child Poverty)
- 2011 Aotearoa Film & Television Awards. Winner, Best Popular Documentary or Documentary Series (Jesus: The Cold Case)
- 2011 New York Festivals® TV & Film Awards. Winner, Silver and Bronze Medals in Religion and History categories (Jesus: The Cold Case)
- 2008 Qantas Film and Television Awards. Winner, Achievement in Directing - Factual/Entertainment Programme Series (The Investigator). Nominated, Best Factual Series (The Investigator)
- 2005 Qantas Television Awards. Nominated, Best Director - Non-Drama (A Question of Justice)
- 2003 New Zealand Television Awards. Winner, Best Narration Script - Non-Drama; shared with Ian Johnstone (The Lost Dinosaurs of New Zealand.) Nominated, Best Director - Documentary (The Lost Dinosaurs of New Zealand)
- 2003 Banff Television Awards (United States). Finalist (The Lost Dinosaurs of New Zealand)
- 2003 New York Festivals® TV & Film Awards. Finalist (The Lost Dinosaurs of New Zealand)
- 2002 TV Guide NZ Television Awards. Winner, Best Director - Factual/Entertainment (Wild about New Zealand)
- 2000 TV Guide Television Awards. Nominated, Best factual programme or documentary script, shared with Ian Johnstone (The Trouble with Ben).
- 1999 TV Guide Television Awards. Nominated, Best Director - Factual (Shaky Beginnings)
- 1997 TV Guide Film & Television Awards of New Zealand. Winner, Best Director - Factual (Inside New Zealand: Murder, They Said)
- 1993 Film & TV Awards. Winner, Best Director - Documentary (Serious Fraud)

== Controversies ==
Some of Bryan Bruce's documentaries have been controversial, and garnered media attention particularly in New Zealand.

Inside Child Poverty, which exposed the plight of children living in New Zealand's poorest homes on the eve of the 2011 election, contributed to the establishment of a Ministry for Children, The Children's Act and the setting of Child Poverty Reduction Targets.

Another controversial documentary was Bryan Bruce's award winning Jesus: The Cold Case, which looked at the roots of antisemitism. TVNZ was initially reluctant to release the 90 minute documentary, and after doing so, Bruce received criticism from some reviewers and members of the fundamentalist Christian community. In spite of this, it won the NZ AFTA for Best Documentary and was a Silver and Bronze Medal Winner in the Religion and History categories at The New York Festivals Television and Film Awards in 2011.

== Documentaries ==
A number of Bruce's documentaries are lodged at The New Zealand Film Archive and can be viewed at his online newsletter.

== Filmography ==
=== Documentaries ===
Source: NZ On Screen.

- 1988: Nothing to Live For? The first time New Zealanders openly talk about suicide.
- 1989: Safer Sex. A studio based programme about sexually transmitted disease.
- 1990: Peter Blake. Follows yachtsman Peter Blake and his family during the 1989 Whitbread Round the World Race.
- 1991: 1981 The Tour. Ten Years On. Bryan meets New Zealanders from all viewpoints to discuss the 1981 Springbok Tour.
- 1992: Whina, Te Whaea O Te Moto - Mother of the Nation. The life of Maori land rights activist Dame Whina Cooper.
- 1993: Stand By Your Man. Three women, whose partners committed major crimes, discuss the effects on them/their families.
- 1993: Breaking Barriers. The life and works of filmmaker John O'Shea.
- 1994: 17 - Snapshot of a Generation. Teenagers talk about their lives. Hosted by Martin Henderson.
- 1994: You're Soaking In It. A social history of New Zealand through advertisements.
- 1995: Serious Fraud. Three crimes investigated by the Serious Fraud Office.
- 1995: Beyond a Joke: A search for the New Zealand sense of humour as told by famous comedians.
- 1996: The Coach. The fortunes of three sports coaches: Silver Ferns, Canterbury Rugby and a little league soccer coach.
- 1996: Murder, They Said. Trial of David Tamihere for the murder of two Swedish backpackers.
- 1997: In Cold Blood. Compares David Gray, Martin Bryant and Thomas Hamilton, three mass murderers.
- 1998: First Impressions. How we make up our minds about people and situations in the first 30 seconds of an encounter.
- 1999: Heavy Petting. An exploration of the relationship between people and their pets.
- 1999: Shaky Beginnings. Jim Hickey travels around New Zealand looking at our geological origins.
- 1999: The Trouble With Ben. A mother looks after her severely disabled son.
- 2000: State of Mind. What effect did the move from asylums to community care have on patients?
- 2001: Workhorse to Dreamhorse. A history of the horse in New Zealand.
- 2001: The Bughouse. Presenter Ruud Kleinpaste reveals the bugs that live in our houses.
- 2002: The Sir Howard Morrison Story. Legendary singer Sir Howard Morrison tells his life story.
- 2002: The Bridge. Events that have taken place on the Auckland Harbour Bridge since its creation.
- 2002: The Last Place On Earth. A documentary about New Zealand's geology, flora and fauna.
- 2002: The Lost Dinosaurs of New Zealand. Looks at the work of self-taught palaeontologist Joan Wiffen.
- 2003: Just a Little Mad. A documentary about schizophrenia.
- 2004: Trial By Ordeal. Trials of John Barlow for murder of the Eugene Thomas and his son.
- 2005: A Question of Justice. Did David Bain murder his family?
- 2005: Monsters of the Deep. The real and mythical creatures in our oceans.
- 2005: What's Your Verdict - Mark Lundy. Investigation into the case of Mark Lundy, who murdered his wife and child.
- 2010: Did Robin Bain Murder His Family? Revisiting the Bain case subsequent to David Bain being acquitted.
- 2011: Inside Child Poverty. Examines child poverty in New Zealand.
- 2011: Jesus: The Cold Case. The search for the historical Jesus (52 mins and 90 min versions).
- 2014: Mind the Gap. Neo-liberalism has created a huge gap between the rich and the poor in New Zealand.
- 2016: World Class? Inside New Zealand Education - A Special Report. A review of New Zealand's current state of education.
- 2017: Who Owns New Zealand Now?. Investigation into New Zealand's housing policy.
- 2022: Inside Child Poverty Revisited. Revisits child poverty in New Zealand for TV3's Public Journalism Fund.
- 2023: The Food Crisis. An examination of why food costs so much in New Zealand and what can be done about it.
- 2026: Finding Andrew: The Kiwi hero killed in Ukraine. An investigation into New Zealander Dr Andrew Bagshaw's murder in Ukraine.

=== Documentary series ===
Source: NZ On Screen.

- 2000–2001; 2013: Wild About New Zealand. Journey through New Zealand's National Parks and connect with those preserving them.
- 2007–2011: The Investigator. A New Zealand unsolved murder series. Bryan Bruce examines a new case each episode.
- 2014: Passion in Paradise: A Sexual History of New Zealand. Docu-drama series about sexual history of New Zealand.
- 2022: A Question of Justice. A team of four journalists examine contemporary justice issues during four episodes.

=== Podcast series ===
- 2026: The Murder of Andrew Bagshaw. A six-part podcast covering Dr Andrew Bagshaw's journey from New Zealand to Ukraine, where he was executed in 2023.
