= Rosie Horton =

New Zealand philanthropist (1937–2023)

Dame Rosie Horton DNZM QSO QSM
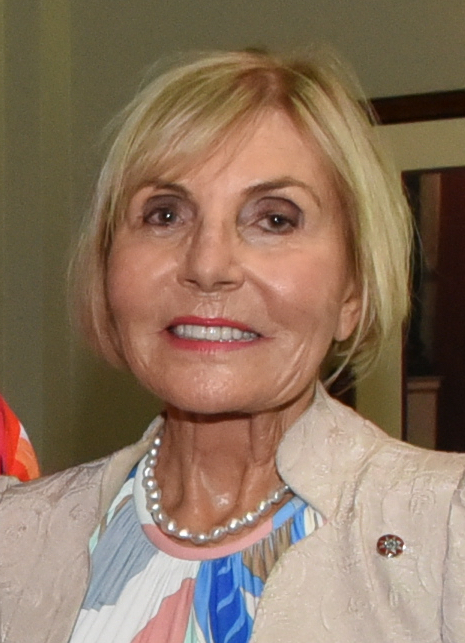
- Horton in 2019
- Born: Rosemary Anne Moon; 21 August 1937; Christchurch, New Zealand
- Died: 14 May 2023 (aged 85); Auckland, New Zealand
- Known for: Charitable and philanthropic work

Dame Rosemary Anne Horton DNZM QSO QSM (née Moon; 21 August 1937 – 14 May 2023) was a New Zealand philanthropist. For more than 40 years she raised money for New Zealand organisations, many of which focus on sick children and women.

== Biography ==
Horton was born in Christchurch on 21 August 1937 to Olga (known as Bill) and Ellis Moon and grew up in Ashburton. Her mother died of breast cancer in February 1963.

In her late 20s, Horton worked in the library at UEB, a large corporate business in Auckland.

Horton was a founding trustee of the Starship Foundation and Friends of Starship in Auckland. She was also the founding chair of the New Zealand Breast Cancer Foundation, and had contributed to Women's Refuge, the SPCA and the Salvation Army.

In 2014, Horton and her husband established the Michael and Dame Rosie Horton Prize at the University of Auckland to remember New Zealand journalist and writer, Marcia Russell.

Horton and her husband's second home was in Australia and they collected over 300 pieces of contemporary Aboriginal art. The collection will be donated to the Art Gallery of New South Wales in Sydney.

=== Personal life and death ===
Horton was married to Michael Horton, her second husband, who was the managing director of newspaper and magazine publisher Wilson & Horton until 1995.

Horton died in Auckland on 14 May 2023, at the age of 83.

== Honours and awards ==
In 1990, Horton received the New Zealand 1990 Commemoration Medal. In the 1993 Queen's Birthday Honours, she was awarded the Queen's Service Medal for community service. In the 2004 Queen's Birthday Honours, she was appointed a Companion of the Queen's Service Order for community service. In the 2011 Queen's Birthday Honours, she was made a Dame Companion of the New Zealand Order of Merit, for services to philanthropy.
