= Street Legal (New Zealand TV series) =

- Genre: Legal drama
- Directed by: Chris Bailey; John Laing; Peter Sharp
- Starring: Jay Laga'aia; Katherine Kennard; Daniel Gillies; Charles Mesure; Dwayne Cameron
- Composer: Don McGlashan
- Country of origin: New Zealand
- Original language: English
- No. of series: 4
- No. of episodes: 53

Production
- Executive producers: Greg McGee; Chris Bailey; Dorothee Pinfold
- Producer: Chris Hampson
- Cinematography: Simon Baumfield; Fred Renata
- Editor: Jonathan Venz
- Running time: 60 minutes
- Production company: ScreenWorks

Original release
- Network: TV2
- Release: 11 July 2000 – 21 August 2003

Street Legal is a New Zealand legal drama focused on the lives of a small group of lawyers. The show was produced by ScreenWorks. A total of four series consisting of 53 episodes were aired between 11 July 2000 and 21 August 2003.

== History ==
Producer Chris Hampson, director Chris Bailey and writer Greg McGee formed a production company, ScreenWorks, in 1998 to produce Street Legal, which they had been developing since 1993. The pilot aired in 1998 and the first series in 2000. The series was filmed at Studio West in West Auckland.

In 2001, the series was sold to the Seven Network becoming the first New Zealand drama series to air on a prime time slot in Australia. The deal was negotiated with a London-based distributor. In October that year, NZ On Air gave ScreenWorks a NZ$4.6 million grant to finance a third season of Street Legal, becoming the first local series in seven years to achieve this goal.

== Synopsis ==
The show focused mainly on the lives of the partners of the law firm Wyeth & Associates located in Auckland, New Zealand. The characters include Peter Wyeth (Series 1–3), David Silesi, Joni Collins, Tim O'Connor (Series 1 and 2) and James Peabody (Series 3 and 4). Also seen were Judge Adriana Saunders, Yalena (the goofy secretary), Kees Van Dam, Ange Watson (Series 4), Sadie O'Neil (Series 2 and 3) and Matt Urlich (Series 3 and 4).

The main character David Silesi (Jay Laga'aia) is a maverick lawyer who pushes the limits of the law. He will do anything for his clients and his friends. He also spends most of the show pining for his law partner, Joni Collins. Joni Collins is a level-headed female lawyer at Wyeth & Associates. In the third series, David and Joni join and buy out the firm to save it after Peter dies in unfortunate circumstances.

== Cast ==
=== Main ===
- Jay Laga'aia as David Silesi
- Katherine Kennard as Joni Collins
- Daniel Gillies as Tim O'Connor (series 1–2)
- Charles Mesure as Kees Van Dam
- Dwayne Cameron as James Peabody (series 3–4)

=== Recurring ===
- Kate Elliott as Melanie Wyeth (series 1–3)
- Carl Bland as Peter Wyeth (series 1–2)
- Louise Wallace as Adriana Saunders
- Ben Baker as Samson Silesi (series 1)
- Sara Wiseman as Louise Jarvis (series 1)
- Cal Wilson as Yalena
- Andrew Binns as Det. Sr. Sgt. Jack Clifford (series 2)
- Ingrid Park as Maddy McGuire (series 2–4)
- Manu Bennett as Matt Urlich (series 3–4)
- Tandi Wright as Ange Watson (series 4)

=== Main characters ===
David Silesi is an unconventional lawyer. Ambitious and hot-headed, he's a man with a passion for winning and he's not afraid to bend the rules to get a result. He is the central character in Street Legal and was specifically created with actor Jay Laga'aia in mind.

Joni Collins is a colleague of David Silesi's at Wyeth and Associates. Her cool, restrained English Rose quality is the very opposite of David's braggadocio. This worked well when they were lovers, but now that they have to run the business between them, it creates a lot of conflict.

Detective Senior Sergeant Kees Van Dam sees himself as an honest cop relentlessly pursuing the course of justice. Most of the time he is, but he can also be uncompromising and single-minded to the exclusion of all else, including his love for Joni Collins.

A 1944 Ford Jailbar was also seen in nearly every episode of the first three series. It is David Silesi's main companion. Early in the first series, David's Ute was stolen, so his brother seeing his reaction to the truck decided to buy it for him. In the middle of the third series, the truck broke down, and was never seen again, replaced by a brand new Holden Ute.

== Awards and nominations ==
=== Academy of Film and Television Arts ===
Year	Nominee	Award	Result	Ref
2002	Chris Hampson	Best Drama Series or Serial	Nominated	
2002	Jay Laga'aia	Best Actor	Nominated	
2002	Greg McGee	Best Script, Drama Series	Nominated	
2002	Simon Baumfield	Camera, Drama	Nominated	
2002	Larry Justice	Best Contribution to Design	Nominated	
2003	For "No Silver Bullet"	Best Episode of a Drama Serial	Won	
2003	Street Legal	Best Drama Series or Serial	Won	
2003	Katherine Kennard	Best Actress	Won	
2003	Charles Mesure	Best Supporting Actor	Won	
2003	Fred Renata	Best Camera, Drama	Won	
2003	Don McGlashan	Best Original Music	Won	
