= Marcia Russell =

New Zealand journalist (1940–2012)

Marcia Grace Russell OBE (1940 – 1 December 2012) was a New Zealand journalist and documentary-maker.

== Biography ==
Russell started out as a cadet reporter for the New Zealand Herald in 1959, then going on to found Thursday, a magazine in 1968.

In 1975, she joined South Pacific Television, presenting the television show Speakeasy and reporting for News at Ten.

She went on to work on award-winning shows such as Landmarks (1981) and The New Zealand Wars (1998), for which she received an award in scriptwriting.

Russell died on 1 December 2012 after a short illness.

=== Recognition ===
In the 1996 New Year Honours, Russell was appointed an Officer of the Order of the British Empire, for services to journalism. In 2003, she was the inaugural recipient of the Academy of Film and Television Lifetime Achievement Award.

In 2014 Dame Rosie Horton and her husband established the Michael and Dame Rosie Horton Prize at the University of Auckland to remember Russell's life and career.

== Publications ==
- Revolution: New Zealand from Fortress to Free Market. Hodder Moa Beckett. 1996. ISBN 978-1869584283.
