= The Boy from Andromeda =

- Created by: Jonathon Gunson
- Written by: Jonathon Gunson; Ken Catran
- Directed by: Wayne Tourell
- Starring: Katrina Hobbs; Jane Creswell; Fiona Kay; Anthony Samuels
- Composer: John Gibson
- Country of origin: New Zealand
- Original language: English
- No. of seasons: 1
- No. of episodes: 6

Production
- Producer: Caterina De Nave
- Cinematography: Allen Guilford
- Editor: Roger Grant
- Running time: 23 minutes

Original release
- Release: 30 June 1991

The Boy from Andromeda is a 1991 New Zealand children's sci-fi television series. It was co executive produced by Canada's Atlantis Films and it was presented in Canada as a single film.

== Synopsis ==
Three kids discover a young boy from Andromeda, the only survivor of a spaceship crash. They join together to save the earth and a passing Andromedan fleet.

== Cast ==
- Katrina Hobbs as Jenny
- Jane Creswell as Drom
  - John Watson as Drom (voice)
- Fiona Kay as Tessa
- Anthony Samuels as Lloyd

== Reception ==
The Ottawa Citizen's Tony Atherton states "The aliens look and sound like extras on a Dr. Who set, but the special effects are well-used and the story skips along briskly most of the time." He also praises the use of a female hero in what is usually a "myopically sexist" genre. Bonnie Malleck in the Waterloo Region Record writes "words and character development take a back seat to action, special effects (albeit low-budget ones) and plenty of thrills." Sid Adilman of The Toronto Star said "The New Zealand accents are a slight problem for North American ears; not all of the special effects work as well as intended and the story of an alien youngster far from home and unable to get back is not exactly unexplored territory".
