= Eleanor Bishop (director) =

New Zealand stage director and playwright

- Citizenship: New Zealand
- Education: Victoria University of Wellington, Carnegie Mellon University
- Occupations: Theatre director and playwright
- Known for: Yes Yes Yes a play about consent for young people
- Website: https://www.eleanorbishop.org/

Eleanor Bishop is a New Zealand stage director, producer and playwright. Her play Yes Yes Yes co-written with Karin McCracken for young people about relationships and consent has been seen throughout New Zealand, in Montreal, Wales and Catalonia.

== Career ==
Bishop is from Wellington. She graduated from Victoria University of Wellington where she completed Bachelor of Arts with Honours in Theatre and from Carnegie Mellon University with a Master of Fine Arts in directing. She is a founding member of Wellington-based theatre company The PlayGround Collective.

Following university Bishop directed the play The Intricate Art of Actually Caring, initially presented at the New Zealand Fringe Festival in the bedroom of a flat. This play won the two wards, Best Theatre in the Fringe (Fringe Festival Awards) and Most Original Production (Chapman Tripp Theatre Awards). It went on to tour New Zealand.

Plays that Bishop is the writer-director of include an adaption of Foreskin's Lament by Greg McGee called Boys.

Bishop directed a digital version of Chekhov's The Seagull in 2019 for Auckland Theatre Company brought about by the COVID-19 pandemic.

Opera directing experience with New Zealand Opera includes assistant director for The Marriage of Figaro and director of The Strangest of Angels composed by Kenneth Young featuring Anna Leese about Janet Frame.

Bishop has a creative partnership with actor and writer Karin McCracken, their company is called EBKM. They won the Bruce Mason Playwriting Award in 2022, which was the first time it went to a partnership. Productions they have co-created include Jane Doe (2017) about rape culture which toured New Zealand and was presented at the Edinburgh Fringe 2017 and Sydney Fringe in 2018 gathering awards in New Zealand and Australia and Yes Yes Yes, that examines 'healthy relationships and consent' and is for a youth audience. Yes Yes Yes was a development from Jane Doe and their research included interviewing students and workshopping with young people too and premiered in 2019. McCracken had previously worked as an educator with Wellington's Sexual Abuse Prevention Network. Yes Yes Yes it has been presented throughout New Zealand and Montreal, Canada. It is described as: "Part confession, part documentary, part open conversation," and won an award for Excellence in Theatre for Social Change at the Wellington Theatre Awards. Early in 2024 the theatre company Theatr Genedlaethol Cymru in Wales presented a bi-lingual version of the play (Ie, Ie, Ie), and the Catalonian theatre company Teatre de l'Aurora in Igualada produced a version of it too (Si, Si, Si).

They created with Julia Croft Body Double, about rules that define sexuality. Bishop and McCracken co-created Heartbreak Hotel presented in 2023 Auckland at Q Theatre and the Hawkes Bay Arts Festival. In this production McCracken performed alongside Simon Leary and Bishop directed, it was produced by Melanie Hamilton. It received positive reviews and was described by one reviewer as a 'music-comedy concoction'. An autobiographical fiction about author Chris Kraus is the subject of Bishop and McCracken's 2024 play Gravity & Grace.

Bishop has worked with Marianne Weems and the multimedia theatre company The Builders Association.

== Awards ==
- Auckland Fringe Social Impact Award (2017) – Jane Doe (co-writer & director)
- Sydney Fringe Critics Choice Award – Jane Doe (co-writer & director)
- Sydney Fringe Melbourne Tour-Ready Award – Jane Doe (co-writer & director)
- Wellington Theatre Award for Most Original Production (2018) – Jane Doe (co-writer & director)
- Wellington Theatre Awards for Excellence in Theatre for Social Change – Yes Yes Yes (co-writer & director)
- Auckland Theatre Awards for Excellence for Overall Production – Yes Yes Yes (co-writer & director)
- Bruce Mason Playwriting Award 2022 (with Karin McCracken)
- John Wells Fellowship
- Fulbright Scholarship
