= Meet the Feebles =

1989 film by Peter Jackson

- Theatrical release poster
- Directed by: Peter Jackson
- Written by: Peter Jackson; Danny Mulheron; Fran Walsh; Stephen Sinclair
- Produced by: Peter Jackson; Jim Booth
- Starring: Mark Hadlow; Peter Vere-Jones; Donna Akersten; Stuart Devenie
- Cinematography: Murray Milne
- Edited by: Jamie Selkirk
- Music by: Peter Dasent
- Production company: WingNut Films
- Distributed by: Kerridge Odeon
- Release date: 8 December 1989
- Running time: 97 minutes
- Country: New Zealand
- Language: English
- Budget: $750,000
- Box office: $80,000 (New Zealand)

Meet the Feebles (also known as Frogs of War in New Zealand as the film's English fake working title) is a 1989 New Zealand adult puppet musical black comedy horror film directed by Peter Jackson, and written by Jackson, Fran Walsh, Stephen Sinclair, and Danny Mulheron (who also performed the body of lead character Heidi the Hippo). The plot follows a stage troupe of anthropomorphic animals in a perverse comic satire. In contrast to the positive innocence and naïve folly of The Muppets, the Feebles largely present negativity, vice, and other misanthropic characteristics.

The film is the first Jackson co-wrote with his future partner Fran Walsh, with the two collaborating on all his subsequent films. The film also marked the beginning of Jackson's collaborations with Richard Taylor and Wētā Workshop, as created by Taylor and Tania Rodger, who all worked on Jackson's subsequent films.

== Plot ==
The Fabulous Feebles Variety Hour theatre troupe is rehearsing with hopes of finding success through being chosen for a syndicated television show. Star performer Heidi the hippopotamus is insulted by pornographic rat director Trevor and complains to her boss and lover, Bletch the walrus, unaware of his affair with Siamese cat Samantha. Robert, a hedgehog and the troupe's newest member, falls in love with a poodle named Lucille and successfully serenades her with encouragement from Arthur, the show's worm manager.

During the leadup to the show, members of the troupe experience their own personal troubles. Sid, an animal trainer elephant, is visited by his ex-fling Sandy, a chicken, who is filing a paternity suit against him after birthing an elephant-chicken hybrid named Seymour. Heidi gorges on cake while reminiscing about her past after Samantha reveals Bletch's infidelity. Harry the rabbit catches a terminal disease after a sexual fling, which tabloid reporter F.W. Fly overhears and publishes in the newspaper. Wynyard, a drug-obsessed frog who suffers from PTSD from his experiences in the Vietnam War, desperately looks for money in order to obtain more drugs. Trevor drugs and rapes Lucille in order to make her the new star for his pornos, causing Robert to think that she is being unfaithful to him and break up with her. Bletch, while playing golf with his henchman Barry the bulldog, initiates a confidential drug deal with a warthog named Cedric.

After a disastrous rehearsal, Heidi is berated by Sebastian, the show's Arctic fox director, causing her to complain to Bletch again, only to discover his affair with Samantha, upsetting her further. Bletch, realizing Cedric provided him borax, decides to go to the docks with Trevor and Barry to obtain the drugs themselves. Bletch is informed by Sebastian that the show is canceled because Heidi is refusing to perform, but he successfully persuades her by feigning love for her.

At the docks, Bletch, Trevor and Barry obtain the drugs after killing Cedric, his whale boss Mr. Big, and several crab henchmen, but Barry is killed by a giant black widow spider in the ensuing escape. On their way back to the theater, Bletch learns of Harry's disease in the newspaper, and kills F.W. for gossiping. During the show, Sebastian tells Bletch that they were picked up by the network. As Bletch celebrates in his office, Heidi attempts to seduce him, only for him to confess that he never loved her and that he intends to groom Samantha into being her replacement. Heartbroken, Heidi decides to commit suicide; after failing to hang herself, she prepares to use a machine gun on herself in Bletch's office. After being taunted by Samantha, Heidi snaps and shoots her dead.

Meanwhile, the show gradually goes awry: an ailing Harry vomits on stage, Sid is accosted by Sandy in front of the audience, an intoxicated Wynyard accidentally kills himself during his knife-throwing act, and Sebastian performs a musical number about sodomy in a desperate attempt to save the show. Heidi goes on a violent rampage throughout the theater, killing many troupe members, including Harry and Sandy, before shooting Sid in his kneecaps. Before she can kill Lucille, Robert saves her, claiming he still loves her, with Lucille revealing what Trevor did to her. Before Heidi can kill Bletch, he tries to calm her down by saying he still loves her, but this proves to be a ruse to make Heidi lower her guard so Trevor can kill her. Robert attacks Trevor, allowing Heidi to grab her gun and kill both Trevor and Bletch. Arthur regretfully informs Heidi that he just reported her to the authorities, and Heidi, accepting her fate, performs her song before she is arrested.

A photographic postscript reveals what happened to the survivors following the massacre: Sid became a struggling horticulturalist with Seymour following his kneecap surgeries, Arthur received an OBE and retired to the countryside, Sebastian wrote an autobiography about the massacre and is negotiating the film rights, Robert and Lucille got married and had two children and Heidi, after serving ten years in a female penitentiary, was rehabilitated into the community and now works at a large supermarket under a new identity.

== Cast ==
=== Puppeteers ===
- Danny Mulheron as Heidi (in-suit performer)
- Jonathon Acorn - Supervising puppeteer
- Ramon Aguilar - Supervising puppeteer
- Eleanor Aitken
- Terri Anderton
- Sean Ashton-Peach
- Carl Buckley
- Sarah Glensor
- George Port
- Ian Williamson
- Justine Wright

=== Voices ===
- Donna Akersten as:
  - Lucille
  - Samantha
  - Dorothy
  - Female Rabbit #1
  - Chorus Girl #2
  - Fitness Tape Voice
- Stuart Devenie as:
  - Sebastian
  - Madame Bovine
  - Sandy
  - Cedric
  - Eight Bal
  - Seymour
  - Female Rabbit #2
  - Chorus Girl #1
- Mark Hadlow as:
  - Heidi
  - Robert
  - Barry
  - Chorus Girl #3
- Ross Jolly as:
  - Harry
  - Dennis
  - Abi Bargwan
  - Mr. Big
  - Pekingese
  - Crab #2
  - Vietnamese Gopher
- Brian Sergent as:
  - Trevor
  - Wynyard
  - F.W.
  - Dr. Quack
  - Jim
  - Chuck
  - The Spider
  - Vietnamese Soldiers
- Peter Vere-Jones as:
  - Bletch
  - Arthur
  - The Baker
  - Newspaper Mouse (Paperboy)
  - The Announcer
- Mark Wright as:
  - Sid
  - The Masked Masochist
  - Louie
  - Guppy
  - Poodle
  - Snake Bartender
  - Crab #1
  - Chorus Girl #4

== Production ==
The film was originally conceived as part of a television series and only belatedly became a feature after Japanese investors proposed expanding it; as such, the script was hastily re-written. The dialogue was recorded before shooting began. Made on an extremely low budget considering the time-consuming process of working with puppets, the film went over budget and schedule. The feature was filmed in Wellington, with the majority of the scenes being filmed on multiple constructed sets places, in an abandoned railway shed (Shed No. 12 to be exact) at the dockyards. Some scenes were filmed outside the goods shed, such as a few external and internal scenes that were filmed at The St. James Theatre. During filming, some scenes, including the Vietnam flashback, were funded by members of the film crew, and filmed secretly under the title Frogs of War. The Vietnam flashback includes a game of Russian roulette as a parody of The Deer Hunter. An initial application for Film Commission money was rejected by executive director Jim Booth, who a short time later became Jackson's producer. The Commission eventually granted the production two-thirds of its $750,000 budget, though relationships between the funders and the production soured and the Film Commission removed its credit from the film.

It is often mistakenly stated that there are no human characters in the film; the character Abi is a human. However, there are no real-life human characters in the film-- like the animal characters, Abi is a puppet. Director Jackson has a cameo as an audience member dressed as an alien from Bad Taste. Every vehicle seen in the film is a variation on the Morris Minor, including a specially constructed limousine. Morris Minors also appear in Jackson's Bad Taste and Braindead. By presumed coincidence, one of the characters, Harry the Hare, shares a name with the title character of James B. Hemesath's short story "Harry the Hare" (himself a Bugs Bunny pastiche), written for Harlan Ellison's anthology Again, Dangerous Visions in 1972.

== Soundtrack ==
Meet the Feebles (Original Motion Picture Soundtrack)

Soundtrack album
- Released: 1991
- Genres: Electronic; Classical; Stage & Screen
- Label: Q.D.K. Media

The film's music was composed by Peter Dasent. The soundtrack was released in 1991 by Q.D.K. Media.

Track listing

| No. | Title | Length |
|---|---|---|
| 1. | "Meet the Feebles" | 2:23 |
| 2. | "One Leg Missing" | 1:56 |
| 3. | "Guppy Audition" | 1:07 |
| 4. | "Heidi's Aerobics Tape" | 2:57 |
| 5. | "Robert's Serenade" | 1:41 |
| 6. | "Hot Potato" | 1:51 |
| 7. | "The Best Goddamn Producer" | 1:19 |
| 8. | "Dirty Movies" | 1:28 |
| 9. | "Golfing" | 2:14 |
| 10. | "Fly Gets a Scoop" | 1:19 |
| 11. | "Wynyard Gets a Fix" | 1:13 |
| 12. | "Vietnam" | 5:50 |
| 13. | "Garden of Love" | 3:18 |
| 14. | "The Dirty Rat" | 1:57 |
| 15. | "Cake Shop" | 1:02 |
| 16. | "Hippy Shit!" | 1:44 |
| 17. | "Sebastian's Rave" | 1:32 |
| 18. | "Barry's Aria" | 0:49 |
| 19. | "The Wharf" | 4:06 |
| 20. | "The Partial Journalist" | 1:27 |
| 21. | "Kiss Me Bletch!" | 1:45 |
| 22. | "Sodomy" | 2:12 |
| 23. | "Massacre Suite" | 2:14 |
| 24. | "Garden of Love" (Reprise) | 3:09 |
| Total length: | | 46:33 |

== Release ==
The film was marketed in some countries with the tagline: "From the director of Bad Taste, comes a movie with no taste at all!"

Meet the Feebles was given its public premiere at a fantasy film festival in Hamburg, in April 1990.

From then on, the film was released theatrically in Japan (7 December 1990); Portugal (February 1991); Australia (March 1991); Sweden (April 1991); Germany (May 1991); France (July 1991); United Kingdom (April 1992); and the United States (February 1995 in New York and September 1995 nationwide).

The film was banned in Ireland and remains banned as of 2023.

== Reception ==
On Rotten Tomatoes the film has an approval rating of 72% based on reviews from 25 critics, with an average rating of 6.5/10. The site's consensus reads "Dark and vulgar, Meet the Feebles is a backstage comedy featuring puppets that offers proof of Peter Jackson's taste for sheer outrageousness, even if it often lapses into pure juvenilia."

During a limited theatrical release in North America in 2002, critic James Berardinelli touched on aspects of the film which likely helped ensure it limited release in cinemas. "The stories of these ... characters are told in a disgustingly graphic, obscenely offbeat, and caustically funny manner. Meet the Feebles is for those with a strong stomach and a seriously warped sense of humor. The film is so off the beaten track that it makes Monty Python seem mainstream." Janet Maslin of the New York Times gave it 2 out of 5 and wrote that it was "Destined to stand as an unfortunate footnote to Mr. Jackson's career."

== Legacy ==
Despite being a commercial failure on release (grossing only NZ$80,000), the film went on to develop a cult following, gaining new fans after the success of Jackson's The Lord of the Rings trilogy. During his acceptance speech at the 2004 Academy Awards, Jackson joked that both Meet the Feebles and Bad Taste had been "wisely overlooked by the Academy."

The titular Feebles are briefly mentioned in the seventh episode of the 2023 television series The Muppets Mayhem during a cameo by Jackson. Floyd Pepper notes the Electric Mayhem had not crossed paths with Jackson "since that night in Wellington...when we met the Feebles," with Jackson remarking that two Feebles were now in witness protection, and the remainder in prison.

== See also ==
- New Zealand humour
- Adult puppeteering
- Midnight movie
- Avenue Q - An adult-themed musical play featuring human and puppet actors.
- The Happytime Murders - Henson Alternative's first film.
