= Off the Rails: A Love Story =

Off the Rails: A Love Story, usually styled simply as Off the Rails, was a New Zealand television documentary series which ran for one 12-part series in 2004–2005.

The series was a personal travelogue along New Zealand's South Island Main Trunk and North Island Main Trunk railway networks, exploring the history of railways in New Zealand, the scenery they pass through, their history, and their social impact on the regions they serve. The series was written and presented by Marcus Lush and directed by Melanie Rakena for Jam TV, and was broadcast on TV One.

The series won the "Best NZ Information/Lifestyle Programme" award at the 2005 Qantas Television Awards, with Rakena also winning the "Best Director (Non-Drama)" category. The series was also a nominee for the "Best Documentary/Factual Series" award at the 2006 Air New Zealand Screen Awards.

The series was released on Region 4 DVD in 2005.
