= Willy Nilly =

- Genre: Sitcom
- Created by: Mike Smith
- Written by: Ken Duncum; Mike Smith; Cal Wilson; Paul Yates
- Directed by: Mike Smith
- Starring: Sean Duffy; Mark Hadlow; Katrina Hobbs; Tandi Wright; Stuart Devenie; Ellie Smith
- Country of origin: New Zealand
- Original language: English
- No. of series: 3
- No. of episodes: 22

Production
- Producer: Judith Trye
- Cinematography: Phil Burchell
- Editor: John Gilbert
- Running time: 30 mins (including adverts)
- Production companies: Big House Film & Television

Original release
- Network: TV One
- Release: 2 September 2001 – 21 December 2003

Willy Nilly Show is a New Zealand television series originally based on a short film by the same name. It follows the lives of two middle-aged farming brothers, Eric (Sean Duffy) and Harry (Mark Hadlow) who are catapulted into the modern world when their bossy and overprotective mother dies and Joy Full (Tandi Wright), the lovely undertaker's assistant, comes to stay. It is set in the fictional town of Pokapoka A total of 3 series were made which have all been made available on DVD at Filmshop. It was winner of Best Comedy Performance, Script and Direction - NZ TV Awards In 2002, a TV Guide poll found the series to be the most popular New Zealand comedy. The series' most prominent fan base is made up of women over the age of 60.

== Episodes ==
=== Series One (2001) ===
1. Under the Stinkwattle Tree
2. Five Left Feet
3. Down the Tube
4. The Ram Who Knew Too Much
5. In the Nudey
6. The Ghost and the Dinner Party
7. Spring Fever

=== Series Two (2002) ===
1. The Vet (24 August 2002)
2. Harrys Can Do Anything (31 August 2002)
3. Are You My Daddy (7 September 2002)
4. Birth and Death (14 September 2002)
5. Through the Looking Grass (21 September 2002)
6. Mum's Little Treasure (27 September 2002)
7. Rain Rain Go Away (5 October 2002)

=== Series Three (2003) ===
1. Twisted Sister
2. Dr Harry's Casebook
3. Pokapoka Pokerface
4. Silage is Golden
5. The Black Stump
6. Don't Worry Be Harry
7. St Eric of Pokapoka
8. Just Another Day

== Characters ==
- Eric - Sean Duffy
- Harry - Mark Hadlow
- Joy - Tandi Wright
- Mr Bott - Stuart Devenie
- Lubyanka - Ellie Smith (Series 2-3)
- Chantelle - Katrina Hobbs
- Carol - Alison Bruce

== DVD releases ==
All 3 series have been made available on DVD in New Zealand at Filmshop.
