= Last of the Living =

- Directed by: Logan McMillan
- Written by: Logan McMillan
- Starring: Morgan Williams; Robert Faith; Mark Hadlow; Emily Paddon-Brown; Ashleigh Southam
- Cinematography: Kirk Pflaum
- Music by: Ben Edwards, Kurt Preston
- Distributed by: Quantum Releasing
- Release date: 3 May 2009 (Dead by Dawn)
- Running time: 88 minutes
- Country: New Zealand
- Language: English

Last of the Living is a 2009 New Zealand comedy-horror film written and directed by Logan McMillan.

== Plot ==
A contagious virus has spread throughout the land turning everybody who is bitten into zombies. Morgan, Ash, and Johnny believe they are the only humans left, and spend their time lounging in mansions playing video games. When they stumble upon scientist Stef who claims to have a cure, the three of them decide to help save mankind whilst trying to each win her affections.

== Cast ==
- Morgan Williams as Morgan
- Robert Faith as Johnny
- Ashleigh Southam as Ash
- Emily Paddon-Brown as Stef
- Mark Hadlow as Dad

== Reception ==
Felix Vasquez of Cinema Crazed said, "Last of the Living really could make good use of its low budget, and explore the doldrums and tedium of living during the end of the world, but it fails on every level to be scary, funny, interesting, or original."
