= Absent Without Leave (film) =

1992 film

- Directed by: John Laing
- Written by: Graeme Tetley
- Produced by: Robin Laing
- Starring: Craig McLachlan
- Cinematography: Allen Guilford
- Release date: 1992
- Running time: 95 minutes
- Country: New Zealand
- Language: English

Absent Without Leave is a 1992 New Zealand drama film directed by John Laing and starring Craig McLachlan. It was entered into the 18th Moscow International Film Festival. It was summed up by Russell Edwards of Filmnews as "an incomprehensible WW2 soap opera about a dimwitted soldier (Craig McLachlan) and his whining clinging wife (Katrina Hobbs)."

== Cast ==
- Craig McLachlan as James Edwards
- Katrina Hobbs as Daisy Edwards
- Judie Douglass as Ella
- Tony Barry as Peter
- Ken Blackburn as C.O.
- Tony Burton as Constable
- Francis Bell as Paddy
- Robyn Malcolm as Betty
- David Copeland as Claude
- Desmond Kelly as Daisy's Father
- Rebecca Hobbs as Daisy's Sister
- William Kircher as Sergeant Major
- Jed Brophy as Joe
