= Ken Duncum =

New Zealand writer and university teacher

Ken Duncum is a New Zealand playwright and screenwriter. His plays Cherish and Trick of the Light won best new New Zealand play at the Chapman Tripp Theatre Awards in 2003 and 2004. His script for television drama series Cover Story won Best Script for Drama at the New Zealand Film and Television Awards and Best Writer - Comedy for Willy Nilly in 2002. Duncum's plays have toured New Zealand as well as internationally. He was awarded the New Zealand Post Katherine Mansfield Prize for 2010. The prize is NZ$100,000 for a writing residency in France.

Duncum was born in Napier and studied film, theatre and television at Victoria University of Wellington.

== Plays ==
- Blue Sky Boys
- Cherish (published 2004 by Victoria University Press)
- Flipside
- Flybaby
- Horseplay
- Jism
- Panic!
- Picture Perfect
- Polythene Pam
- The Great Gatsby
- The Temptations of St Max
- Trick of the Light (2002), in which two adult Pākehā children grieve their dead mother by returning to a motel that was important in her life.
- Waterloo Sunset

== Television series ==
- Willy Nilly
