= Jim Hickey (broadcaster) =

New Zealand broadcaster (born 1949)

- Born: 1 August 1949 (age 76); Taranaki, New Zealand
- Occupations: Weather presenter, restaurateur
- Employer: TVNZ
- Organisation: Family First New Zealand (board member)
- Known for: Broadcasting
- Spouse: Sue Hickey
- Children: 4

Jim Hickey (born 1 August 1949) is a former weather presenter for TVNZ in New Zealand. He was the senior weathercaster for TVNZ for 22 years.

== Biography ==
Hickey grew up on a farm in Ōpunake, and initially trained as a secondary school teacher before going on to study a Bachelor of Arts in geography with specialisation in climatology. Hickey later completed a Diploma of Meteorology.

In 2006, Hickey was announced as a board member of Family First New Zealand, a conservative Christian lobby group, a position he still holds.

Hickey has an affinity for aviation; during his time as a weatherman, Hickey would pilot himself from his home in New Plymouth to his work in Auckland in a Cessna. In 2019 Stuff published that Hickey was living in an unused airport hangar at the New Plymouth airport that he had remodelled. James Brian Hickey, his father, was a Spitfire pilot in Burma during World War Two.

Hickey has four children, including Sally Jo Hickey, a former influencer.

== Career ==
Hickey's career in the arts began in the early 1980s with minor theatre and television roles, including roles on Mortimer's Patch and Children of the Dog Star.

On 4 July 1988 Hickey began presenting the weather for TVNZ as the senior weathercaster, a position he held until 2003. In 2007 he resumed his role as senior weathercaster, following Brendan Horan's retirement. One notable cross occurred following a snow dump which blocked the Homer Tunnel, and following the cancellation of flights, flew himself and Tāmati Coffey (who was a reporter for Breakfast at the time) from Milford Sound to Queenstown. He retired for the second and final time in late 2014.

Following his time as the senior weathercaster, Hickey has gained somewhat of a celebrity status in New Zealand. Hickey was also known for his on-air persona and gaffes, including one incident where Hickey said "comeburgers," which was then featured on Eating Media Lunch.

In addition to his role as weathercaster, Hickey presented other TVNZ programmes such as Country Calendar, Jim's Car Show, A Flying Visit, How's the Weather Jim?, The Real Middle Earth and the 1999 documentary, Shaky Beginnings by Bryan Bruce.

Alongside his television career, Hickey co-owns a series of cafes and restaurants and has worked in the antique furniture business.

== See also ==
- List of New Zealand television personalities
