= The Court Jesters =

New Zealand improv company

The Court Jesters is a professional improv company founded in 1989 and based in Christchurch, New Zealand. It is a subsidiary of the Court Theatre professional theatre company, acting as a second company within the theatre.

The group provide entertainment for corporate and private clients, run weekly community improv workshops and an annual Theatresports competition for high schools, as well as performing their own weekly or twice-weekly improv comedy show, Scared Scriptless.

== History ==
=== Origins ===
Theatresports at The Court Theatre began in 1987 under the direction of Bryan Aitken and Judie Douglass. This was largely due to the upswing in popularity of improvised theatre internationally and the desire to introduce it to a New Zealand audience. The popularity of the style led to the formation of a permanent improvisational wing of The Court Theatre under the moniker "The Court Jesters" in late 1989.

In 1990 the Court Jesters manager Michael Robinson (working alongside Jim McLarty and Lori Dungey) began a late-night improvised comedy show titled Scared Scriptless at The Court Theatre. Scared Scriptless still runs to this day, and as such is the longest-running (and continuously running) show in New Zealand. Original members of the company were John Hudson, Patrick Duffy, Geoff Dolan, KC Kelly, Greg Cooper, Ross Gumbley, Cal Wilson, Simon Peacock, Susan Fogarty, Matthew Gould, Kevin Smith, Craig Cooper, Carl Nixon, Andie Spargo, Paul Letham, and Michael Robinson.

=== 1990s ===
During the rest of the 1990s, though some members left for television and film work in Auckland and overseas, the Jesters expanded their repertoire with corporate entertainment and teaching improv/theatresports to high schools (as part of the "Theatresports in Schools" programme) and community improvisation classes. The Jesters also had considerable success with dinner theatre including a show at Mona Vale called The Wedding.

In 1994 The Court Jesters sent a team of improvisors to the World Theatresports Championships in Los Angeles. Teams from the UK, South Africa, Canada, Australia, Denmark, America, New Zealand, The Netherlands and other countries competed. New Zealand's team, comprising Simon Peacock, Cal Wilson, Susan Fogarty and Greg Cooper, won the competition.

The late 90s saw the company push the boundaries of improvisational practice through script-based improv works such as I Spy, The X-Philes, Blood, and Doctor Pussy Finger Says No To Tomorrow. The company's first fully scripted work was The Complete History of New Zealand (Abridged), first presented in Christchurch in 1998. Their only other fully scripted play was A Fistful of Dolores which premièred in 2002. The Complete History of New Zealand (Abridged) continues to be presented throughout the country, most recently performed in Hagley Park, Christchurch in 2012. The company also pioneered a school holiday theatre programme using tight casts of three to four actors and scripts that could effectively use the main stage sets for daytime performances. The Court Theatre continues to use this production model for holiday performances.

Alongside the newfound confidence with scripted and part-scripted work, The Court Jesters continued to explore pure improv. The 1997 season of Abandon Script used an approach that saw a full 90-minute show generated from a single word offered by the audience.

=== 2000s ===
By the early 2000s, natural attrition saw the company with only one original member (Andie Spargo). In 2002 the then-current members, dissatisfied with their relationship with The Court Theatre, left to form their own corporate entertainment/improvisation business, 'The Outwits'. In response, The Court Theatre announced that it was reforming The Court Jesters under the management of Nicola Wellbourn and the direction and tutelage of Patrick Duffy (one of the original Jesters who had left the troupe in the early-mid 90s). They held open auditions and from the various actors, singers, entertainers, comedians, street performers, and improvisors who applied formed the new troupe of Court Jesters in December 2002, "rebooting" the company.

These new Jesters took over Scared Scriptless, Theatresports In Schools and corporate entertainment at the beginning of 2003. Effectively starting from scratch, the troupe had to rebuild a fan base and increase audiences for Scared Scriptless, as well as attract more corporate entertainment work and retain the goodwill of The Court Theatre management. While described as a "hard slog" by many, progress was made financially and artistically.

Fairyable was performed in the Christchurch Botanic Gardens in February 2004 as part of the Christchurch City Council's "Summertimes" festival. The format of the show was a long-form improvised fairytale.

In 2005 Kirsty Gillespie took over as manager of the Court Jesters with Jeff Clark remaining as assistant to the manager. While Patrick Duffy remained an active member of the Jesters, Ross Gumbley (another original Court Jester who had moved to Centrepoint Theatre in the mid 90s, and then returned to take the position of Associate Artistic Director of The Court Theatre in 2000) took a much more active role in the performance side of the company.

At the beginning of 2006 the Court Jesters enjoyed a marked surge in numbers at Scared Scriptless (coupled with a change of the start time to 10pm) and continued to build audiences, often moving the show to the larger Court One venue to accommodate ticket sales. Ross Gumbley was appointed artistic director of the Court Theatre in March 2006, effectively securing the company's position.

In May 2006 the company received improvisation tutelage from Keith Johnstone to couple the rise in financial success with increased artistic standards. Scared Scriptless ended its 2006 season having set a new record for box office sales.

In 2007, as part of the launch of The Court Theatre's "Forge" programme, the Jesters presented several limited season shows exploring new concepts, such as themed shows or "long-form" narrative structures. The shows included The Early Early Late Show (family-friendlyshort-form improv), Radio Ha Ha (a themed show set in the golden age of radio), Chatterbox (a comedic form of playback theatre with local celebrities) and A Very Merry Scriptless (a Christmas-themed show for family audiences).

As a part of the 2008 Forge season, the Jesters staged Pulp William (a long-form mash-up of the Shakespeare and Tarantino genres), "Scriptless Uncut" (an Oscars-themed improv show) and a return season of A Very Merry Scriptless, this time as a partially-scripted/partially improvised retelling of Dickens' A Christmas Carol; in 2009 the show similarly tackled the nativity and the Magi before returning to more short-form in 2010. The Early Early Late Show returned as part of the 2009 Forge season and annually thereafter.

In 2009, due to high audience demand, a second weekly performance of Scared Scriptless was added at 10:15pm Saturdays.

=== 2010s ===
A 20th anniversary "30-Hour Improvathon" was held in 2010, featuring both current and past members of the Court Jester company. In the 2010 Forge season, the Jesters presented a long-form show called Off The Map, featuring interweaving narratives and characters in a fictional small New Zealand town.

Following the closure of the Christchurch Arts Centre after the February 2011 Christchurch earthquake, Scared Scriptless resumed performances within three weeks and performed in a variety of venues whilst The Court Theatre constructed its new venue. Companies also hired the Court Jesters directly to perform for them, for example a law firm that was based at the PGC House, one of the two large office buildings that collapsed during the February 2011 earthquake. shows were staged at 8 pm Fridays and Saturdays until The Court Theatre opened its new venue "The Shed". In 2011 The Court Jesters mounted a return season of A Very Merry Scriptless as a Christmas musical.

From 10 February 2012, Scared Scriptless resumed late-night shows at 10:15pm Fridays and Saturdays in the new venue, dubbed "The Shed", in Addington. Due to the more limited space, the Jesters had less opportunities to present shows, although A Very Merry Scriptless returned annually with various themes until 2014.

In 2013 Dan Bain was appointed artistic director of The Court Jesters, a role he held until 2020.

=== 2020 and COVID-19 ===
During the 2020 COVID-19 pandemic, all of the Court Theatre's shows were postponed or cancelled for several months, including Scared Scriptless.

The Court resumed staging productions in The Shed's foyer with safety measures in place in August 2020 and on 21 September 2020 announced that the main auditorium would be reopening. For these 'foyer shows' the Jesters presented Scared Scriptless Attempts: multiple long-form concepts and themed shows including Jane Austen, Harry Potter, Shakespeare, romantic comedy, and a Broadway musical. Once full lockdown restrictions were lifted, Scared Scriptless also returned with shows on Fridays at 10:15pm.

On 16 October 2020 the company celebrated its 30th anniversary with a special 8pm show.

In December 2020 Trubie-Dylan Smith was appointed Artistic Manager of The Court Jesters.

== Scared Scriptless ==
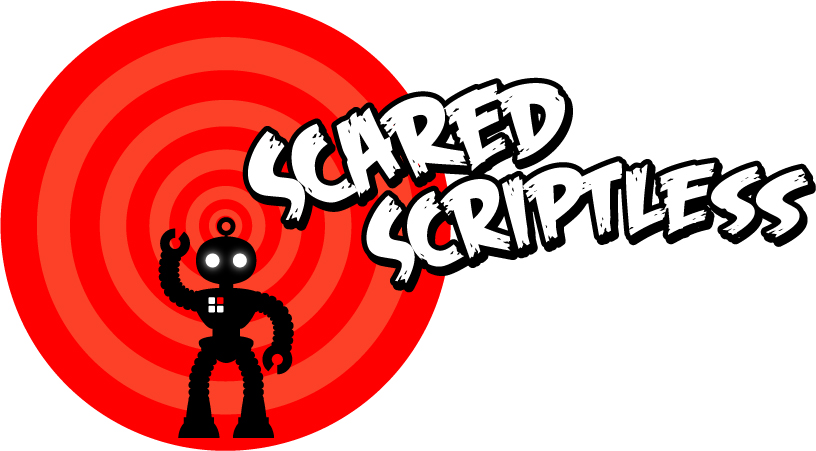
Taken from the Scared Scriptless 2006 poster.

The flagship Court Jesters show is Scared Scriptless, a weekly short-form improvisational comedy show. The show was established in 1990 and is New Zealand's longest-running comedy show.

Scared Scriptless is hosted by an MC, along with anywhere from 4 to 10 players, a muso (a musician who improvises the backing music) and at least one technician/stage manager (who operates the lights and sound). Players and MCs are all members of the Court Jesters and rotate frequently.

The format for the show can change from week to week but is mainly focused on shortform improvisation. Formats include Micetro, Theatresports, Gorilla Theatre and themed performances, as well as variations on these and original formats devised by the Court Jesters. Scenes are based on suggestions from the audience and often challenges/rules (also called "handles" or "games") from the MC.

Scared Scriptless is usually performed on the set of a current Court Theatre production, although in some cases rudimentary furniture and props may be used. Similarly, players often do not use any props or costumes, relying instead on mime and physicality. The usual exception is when the MC may bring along props or costumes for special scenes/games or to fit with the theme of the night. It has on occasion been performed in alternative venues when unable to use the main stage (see the history of the company).

== Performers ==
Over the years the roster of The Jesters has changed regularly.

The original members were either acting interns at The Court Theatre or were brought in through auditions and recruitment. Members often left to pursue other careers or move overseas; subsequently people from school teams, workshops or other towns were recruited into the company as "Associate" Jesters – improvisers who played Scared Scriptless semi-regularly but were not used for corporate work or permanently contracted. By the mid-1990s, many if not all of the troupe were 'second-generation' Jesters, having been coached/taught by the Court Jesters themselves and gone from Associate to Full Jestership.

When the company reformed in late 2002, many of the new troupe were garnered from the University of Canterbury Comedy Club, high school teams and other entertainment groups/organisations. Over the years there have been numerous reshufflings and recruitments as the company continues to evolve. The current roster of regular performers is around 20, with auditions and recruitment of "Apprentice" Jesters biennially.

== Notable alumni ==
- Dan Bain (artistic director) (artistic director of The Court Jesters 2014 – March 2020)
- Kathleen Burns (actor)
- Alice Canton (actor)
- Craig Cooper (artistic director) (artistic director of the Christchurch Arts Festival 2015–17)
- Jarred Christmas (comedian)
- Gregory Cooper (playwright)
- Patrick Duffy (artistic director) (artistic director of the Court Jesters 2002–2008)
- Susan Fogarty (writer, comedian and drama teacher)
- Ross Gumbley (artistic director of the Court Theatre 2006–2019)
- Javier Jarquin (comedian)
- Eli Matthewson (comedian)
- Carl Nixon (playwright/novelist)
- Hamish Parkinson (comedian)
- Daniel Pengelly (artistic director of The Court Theatre 2020–2021)
- Trubie-Dylan Smith (Artistic Manager of The Court Jesters Dec 2020–)
- Kevin Smith (actor)
- Cal Wilson (comedian)
