= 2005 Qantas Television Awards =

- Awarded for: Excellence in New Zealand television and television journalism
- Sponsored by: Qantas
- Date: 12 November 2005
- Location: Auckland
- Country: New Zealand
- Presented by: New Zealand Television Broadcasters Council
- Hosted by: Petra Bagust and Jason Gunn
- First award: 2005

The inaugural New Zealand Qantas Television Awards were staged on 12 November 2005 in Auckland, New Zealand.

The awards show and most of the awards were presented by Petra Bagust and Jason Gunn, with additional awards presented by Helen Clark and Don Brash (or more specifically, parodies of them from the TV show Facelift), Oscar Kightley, Dave Fane, Jaquie Brown and Oliver Driver. Prime's Charlotte Dawson served as a backstage correspondent.

== Nominees and winners ==
Winners are listed first and highlighted in boldface.

Key
† – Non-technical award
‡ – Technical award

=== Television ===
Best Actor in TV Drama†	Best Actress in a TV Drama†
**Antony Starr, Outrageous Fortune (TV3)**; Ben Barrington, The Insider's Guide To Happiness (TV2); Will Hall, The Insider's Guide To Happiness (TV2)	**Robyn Malcolm, Outrageous Fortune (TV3)**; Sophia Hawthorne, The Insider's Guide To Happiness (TV2); Sally Stockwell, The Insider's Guide To Happiness (TV2)
Best NZ Drama†	Best NZ Comedy Programme†
**Outrageous Fortune (TV3)**; Mataku (TV One); The Insiders Guide to Happiness (TV2)	**bro'Town (TV3)**; Matthew & Marc's Rocky Road to the Land of The Rising Sun, (TV2); The 2005 Oddfellows Comedy Gala, (TV2)
Best NZ Children's/Youth Programme†	Best NZ Documentary†
**Holly's Heroes (TV2)**; Koi (Māori Television); The Goober Brothers (TV2)	**Colin McCahon – I Am (TV One)**; Enemy of the State (TV One); NewZild – The Story of New Zealand English (TV One); Reluctant Revolutionary (TV One)
Best NZ Entertainment/Reality Programme†	Best NZ Information/Lifestyle Programme†
**Dancing with the Stars (TV One)**; Living The Dream (TV2); The Tem Show (Prime)	**Off the Rails – A Love Story – (TV One)**; My House My Castle – (TV2); Taste Takes Off – (TV One)
Best Māori Programme†	Best NZ Popular/Factual Unscripted Programme†
**Korero Mai, (Māori Television)**; Eye to Eye with Willie Jackson (TV One); Mama Tere (TV One)	**Intrepid Journeys (TV One)**; Serious Crash Unit, Series II (TV2); The Zoo, Series 6 (TV2)
Best NZ Sports Or Event Coverage†	Best Director (Drama)†
**Shell Helix Motorsport (TV One)**; Jonathan Lemalu – The Homecoming Concert (TV One); Montana World of Wearable Art Awards (TV3)	**Mark Beesley, Outrageous Fortune – "Episode 4: The Cause of This Defect" – (TV3)**; Peter Burger, Mataku – "Te Whakaahua- The Photo" (TV One); Vanessa Alexander, Outrageous Fortune – "Episode 1: Slings and Arrows" – (TV3); Mark Beesley, The Insiders Guide to Happiness – "Episode 6" (TV2)
Best Director (Non-Drama)†	Best Script for a Non-Factual Programme/Series†
**Melanie Rakena, Off The Rails – A Love Story (TV One)**; Bryan Bruce, A Question of Justice (TV One); Nic Craig, Inside New Zealand – Watching You(TV3)	**Rachel Lang, Outrageous Fortune – "Episode 4: The Cause of This Defect" (TV3)**; Lynette Crawford-Williams & Carey Carter, Mataku – "Te Whakaahua – The Photo" (TV One); David Brechin-Smith, The Insiders Guide to Happiness – "Episode 6" (TV2)
Best Camera (Factual)‡	Best Camera (Non-Factual)‡
**Peter Young, Country Calendar (TV One)**; Mike Kelland, Life on the Street – (TV One); Jacob Bryant, Off The Rails – A Love Story (TV One)	**Rewa Harre, Mataku – "Te Whakaahua – The Photo"(TV One)**; Wayne Vinten, Outrageous Fortune (TV3); David Paul, The Insiders Guide to Happiness (TV2)
Best Editing (Factual)‡	
**Justin Hawkes, Shihad Live in Aotea Square (C4)**; Daniel Nikolaison, Between The Lines – Denis Glover (TV One); Matt Wilmot, Off The Rails – A Love Story (TV One)	

=== News and Current Affairs ===
Best News†	TV Journalist of the Year†
**3 News – (TV3)**; One News – (TV One)	Janet McIntyre, Sunday (TV One)
Investigation of the Year†	Best News Reporter†
Campbell Live, "Driver Licence Fraud" – (TV3)	**Lorelei Mason, One News (TV One)**; Duncan Garner, 3 News (TV3); Mike McRoberts, 3 News (TV3); Sonya Wilson, One News (TV One)
Best News Report (Team Award)†	Best Current Affairs Report (Team Award)†
**One News, "Foot & Mouth Scare, Waiheke Island" (TV One)**; 3 News, "Benson Pope" (TV3); 3 News, "Iraq – Democracy/Live Cross/Package" (TV3)	**Campbell Live, "Driver Licence Fraud" (TV3)**; Sunday, "Where's Mine" (TV One); Sunday, "London Bombings" (TV One)
Best Current Affairs Reporter†	Best Current Affairs Series†
**Amanda Millar, 60 Minutes (TV3)**; Melanie Reid, Campbell Live (TV3); Cameron Bennett, Sunday (TV One); Janet McIntyre, Sunday (TV One)	**60 Minutes – (TV3)**; Campbell Live (TV3); Stake Out (TV3)
Best News Or Current Affairs Presenter†	Best Sports News Report (Team Award)†
**Mark Sainsbury, Close Up (TV One)**; Mike McRoberts & Hilary Barry, 3 News (TV3); John Campbell, Campbell Live (TV3)	**One News – "Flavell" (TV One)**; 3 News – "Sidecar" (TV3)
Best News/Current Affairs Editing‡	Best News/Current Affairs Camera (Junior)‡
**Paul Sparkes, Close Up – "Cave Creek" (TV One)**; Paul Enticott, 60 Minutes – "Green Acres" (TV3)	**Richard Postles, Close Up – "Twins" – (TV One)**; Daniel Jones, 3 News – "Foot & Mouth Scare on Waiheke" (TV3); Stefan Lowe, One News – "Net Justice" (TV One)
Best News/Current Affairs Camera (Senior)‡	
**Ross Kenward, 60 Minutes – "Green Acres" (TV3)**; Warren Armstrong, 3 News – "Moa Bones" (TV3); Phillip Melville, Sunday – "The Flu Hunter" (TV One)	

=== Woman's Day Readers' Choice Awards ===
Favourite New Zealand Female Personality†	Favourite New Zealand Male Personality†
**Robyn Malcolm**	**Marc Ellis**
Favourite New Zealand Show†	Favourite International Show†
**Shortland Street**	**Desperate Housewives**
