= Greg McGee =

New Zealand writer and playwright

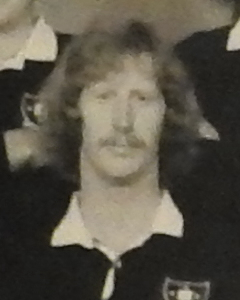
McGee in 1973

Gregory William McGee is a New Zealand writer and playwright, who also writes crime fiction under the pseudonym Alix Bosco.

== Biography ==
McGee was born in 1950 in the South Island town of Oamaru. In his early 20s McGee played rugby as a Junior All Black and became an All Black trialist. He graduated from the University of Otago with a law degree in 1972.

In 1980 his first play, Foreskin's Lament, a drama set in rugby changing rooms and at the after-match party, became an immediate success. The play shows the player nicknamed "Foreskin" and his attempt to fit in with university liberals and with rugby-playing conservatives. In New Zealand a rugby player is an everyman, and the game and play present a model of society in the end of the 1970s on the eve of the 1981 Springbok Tour. The play has a stylistically unusual ending, with the main character directly addressing the audience with a very long speech — or rather interrogation — questioning their own values: "Whaddarya?".

- Tooth and Claw, 1983, retained the same microcosm, but used the courtroom as a metaphor.
- Out in the Cold, 1983, moved the scene to a freezing works, and extended the women's-rights sub-themes of earlier plays.
- Whitemen, 1986, returned to rugby, tackling the Cavaliers' 1986 tour of South Africa, but was a box-office failure.

McGee script-wrote for television, notably two mini-series: Erebus: The Aftermath (an examination of the inquiry following the crash of Air New Zealand Flight 901 in Antarctica) and Fallout (a dramatisation of David Lange's government and the end of ANZUS). He also produced work for shows such as Cover Story, Marlin Bay, Street Legal and, more recently, Orange Roughies. He co-wrote movie scripts for Crooked Earth, Via Satellite (1998), with Anthony McCarten and the Kiwi Welsh rugby comedy Old Scores with Dean Parker. He returned to the theatre with This Train I'm On in 1999. Foreskin's Lament is being reprised for the screen as Skin and Bone.

McGee became a founder of the Screenworks TV production company, a member of the New Zealand Film Council and a past President of the New Zealand Writers Guild. He admitted in 2011 to being the pseudonymous writer Alix Bosco who has written two highly successful crime novels, one of which won the inaugural Ngaio Marsh Award for Best Crime in 2010.

== Principal work ==
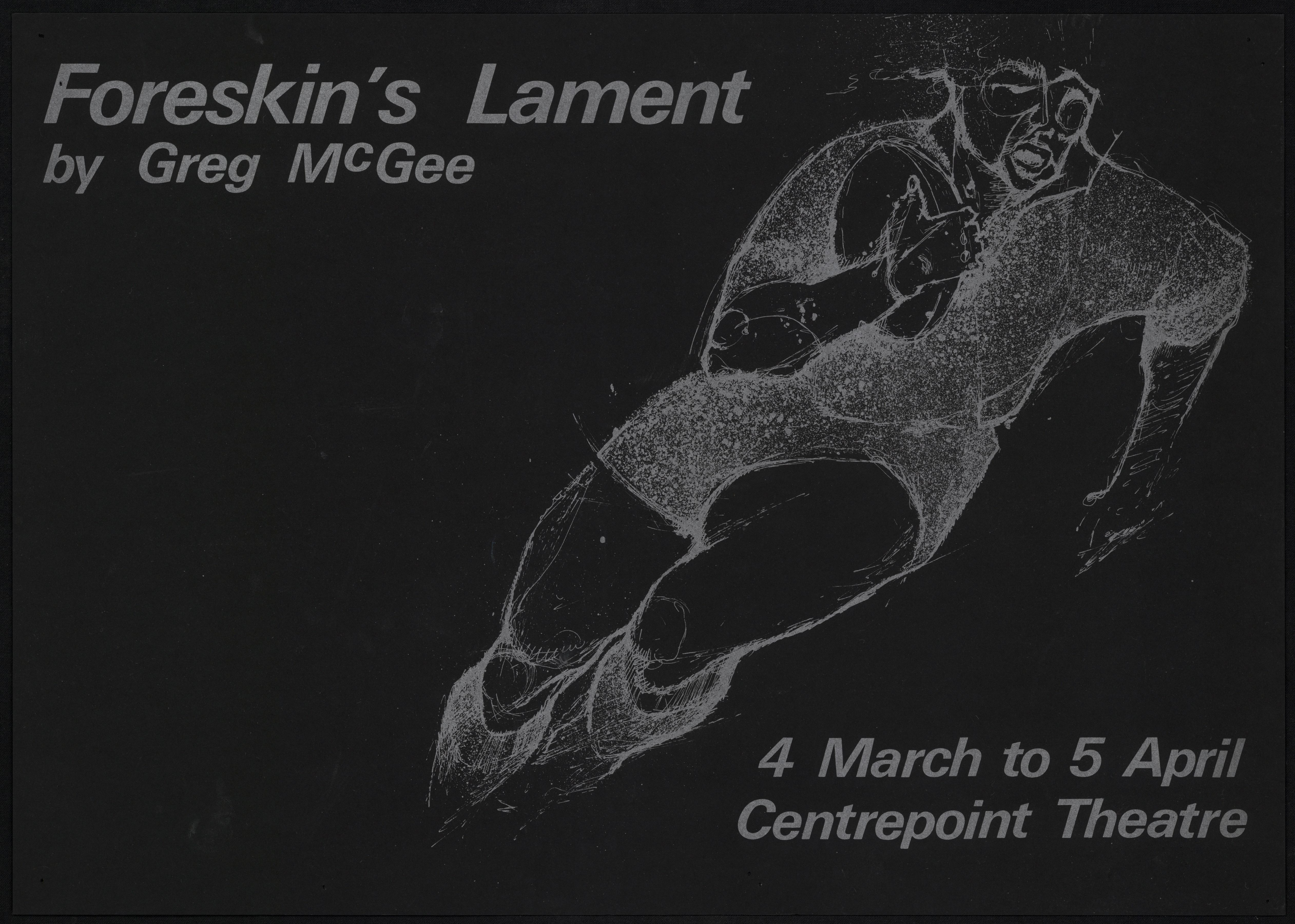
- Centrepoint Theatre poster of Foreskin's Lament
  Foreskin's Lament. Wellington: Price Milburn, with Victoria University Press, 1981.
- Tooth and Claw. Wellington: Victoria University Press, 1984. First performed March 1983.
- Out in the Cold. Wellington: Victoria University Press, 1984. First performed May 1983.
- Whitemen, unpublished play, performed 1986.
- Erebus: The Aftermath. Script by Greg McGee, produced by Caterina De Nave
- Old Scores (film, screenplay written by Greg McGee and Dean Parker), 1991.
- Fallout, television docudrama, with Tom Scott, 1994.
- Cut and Run, crime novel, written under the pseudonym Alix Bosco, 2009.
- Slaughter Falls, crime novel, written under the pseudonym Alix Bosco, 2010.
- The Brokenwood Mysteries, television police procedural series, with Philip Dalkin and James Griffin, 2014.

== Work as Alix Bosco ==
McGee writes crime fiction under the pseudonym Alix Bosco as he also writes in a variety of other media, and wanted to keep his crime-writing persona separate.

In August 2009 Alix Bosco's first thriller novel, Cut & Run, was published in New Zealand by Penguin Books and won the inaugural Ngaio Marsh Award for Best Crime Novel in 2010. The novel is the first in a planned series set in Auckland and starring legal researcher Anna Markunas. The second novel Slaughter Falls is a finalist in the 2011 Ngaio Marsh Award.
