= Stuart Devenie =

New Zealand actor

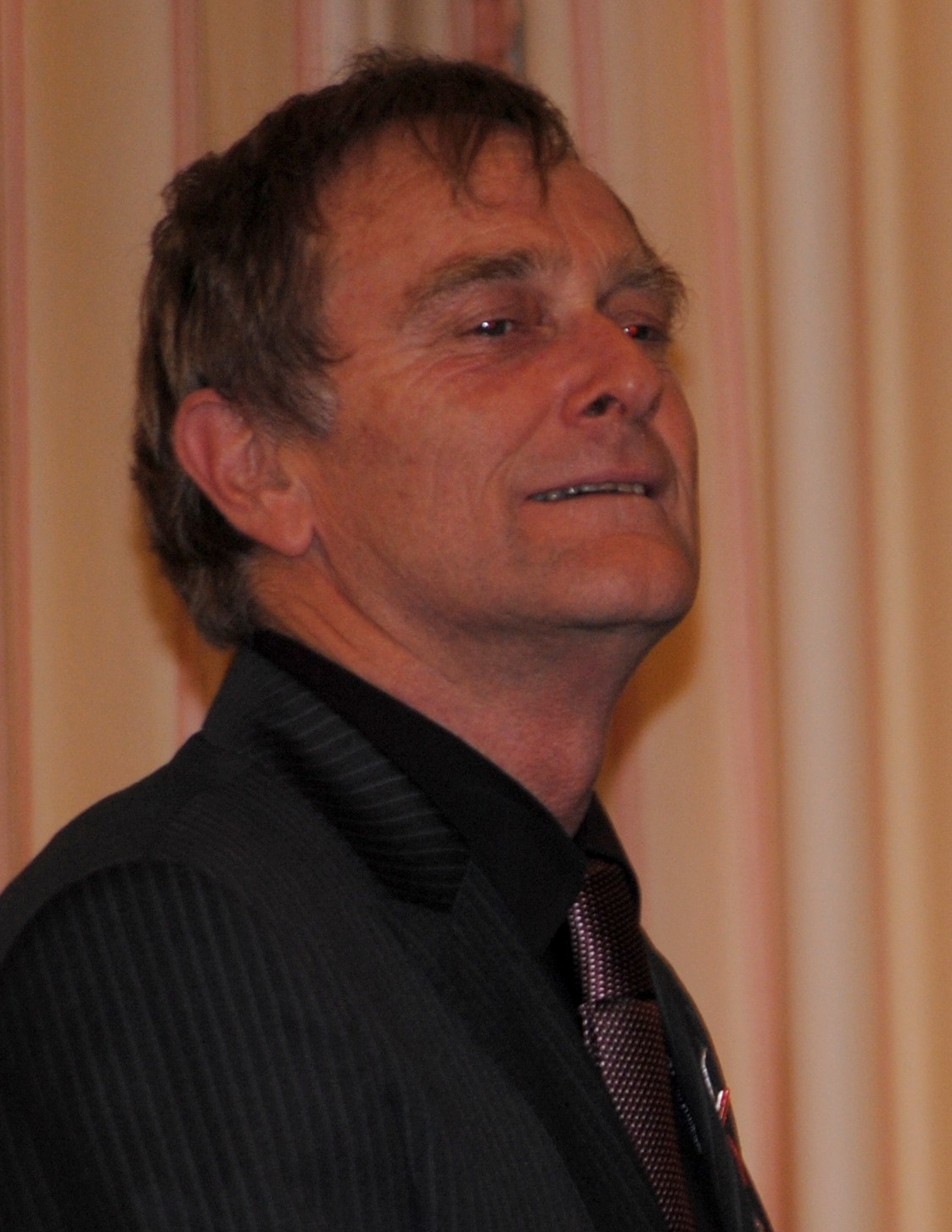
- Devenie in 2010
- Born: 1951 (age 73–74); Wellington, New Zealand
- Occupation(s): Actor; Theatre director
- Website: Agent's Info Page

Stuart Forbes Devenie MNZM (born 1951) is a New Zealand actor and theatre director, whose career spans three decades on stage and screen. He has performed in theatre productions nationally and internationally. In the 1980s, he was the artistic director of Centrepoint Theatre in Palmerston North and has been a senior educator at Toi Whakaari New Zealand Drama School. In 2000, he founded Playfair Ltd theatre company.

== Film and television ==
As an actor, Devenie is best known for a trio of appearances in Peter Jackson films - Meet the Feebles (1989), Braindead (1992 - known in the United States as Dead Alive), and The Frighteners (1996). His most memorable role may be that of Father McGruder in Braindead, wherein he utters the line "I kick arse for the Lord!". In 2000, he appeared as Governor Croque in the short-lived Renaissance Pictures television series Jack of All Trades, alongside American actor Bruce Campbell. More recently he played the Norse god Njord in The Almighty Johnsons.

== Theatre ==
Devenie has directed The Orderly Business of Life and The God Boy for Auckland Theatre Company. As an actor, he has played many lead roles and performed in major productions during his distinguished stage career from classical plays to contemporary and new New Zealand works. Productions include Cat on a Hot Tin Roof, Caligula, The Talented Mr Ripley, Ladies Night, Middle Age Spread, Serial Killers, The Cripple of Inishmaan, Twelve Angry Men, Uncle Vanya, Molly Sweeney and The Pohutukawa Tree.

== Honours ==
In the 2008 New Year Honours, Devenie was appointed a Member of the New Zealand Order of Merit, for services to entertainment.
