= Cal Wilson =

New Zealand stand-up comedian (1970–2023)

- Born: 5 October 1970; Christchurch, New Zealand
- Died: 11 October 2023 (aged 53); Sydney, Australia
- Spouse: Chris Woods (m. 2008)
- Children: 1

Comedy career
- Years active: 1990–2023
- Medium: Stand-up; writing; radio; television

Cal Wilson (5 October 1970 – 11 October 2023) was a New Zealand stand-up comedian, author, radio and television presenter based in Australia. Wilson wrote the New Zealand sitcom Willy Nilly from 2001 until 2003. She then appeared in numerous comedy and television shows, including being the host of Sleuth 101, co-host of The Great Australian Bake Off, and voiced Petal and Thorn in the children's TV series Kitty Is Not a Cat. Wilson also co-hosted several radio shows.

== Early life and education ==
Wilson was born in New Zealand on 5 October 1970. After high school in Christchurch, she completed a Bachelor of Arts degree at the University of Canterbury.

== Comedy career ==
Wilson co-founded the Court Jesters improv group in 1990; she was part of the New Zealand team that won the World Theatresports title in Los Angeles in 1994.

Wilson then moved to stand-up comedy full-time and in 1997 was the inaugural winner (with Ewen Gilmour) of New Zealand's most prestigious comedy award, the Billy T, for her show Dirty Bitch. She also regularly appeared on TV3's Pulp Comedy. From 2003, she began living in Melbourne.

Wilson performed the show TeleBimbo in 1998 in Auckland, Wellington, and Christchurch. In 1999 she presented Cal Wilson Is The AuntiChrist at the NZICF.

In 2001, Wilson won the "Best Newcomer" award at the Melbourne International Comedy Festival (MICF). She appeared to critical acclaim at the Edinburgh Festival Fringe in 2004.

Her 2006 show, Up There, Cal Wilson, sold out at the MICF.

== Television ==
During her early career, Wilson was a writer for the New Zealand sitcom Willy Nilly from 2001 until 2003. In 2007, she was part of the ensemble cast of the Australian sketch comedy TV show The Wedge. She was also a writer for the series. In 2008, Wilson appeared in the eighth series of the Australian version of Dancing with the Stars. She was paired with series 7 winner Craig Monley.

In 2010, Wilson became the host of the program Sleuth 101 and also took part in the Melbourne International Comedy Festival Great Debate. During this time Wilson began making an appearance on the New Zealand TV comedy show 7 Days. She appeared in several episodes of the series until 2018.

Wilson appeared as a guest on the UK comedy quiz show QI in 2012 and in the following year was captain of "Team Cal" on the Australian light entertainment television series Slide Show.

In 2018, Wilson voiced Petal and Thorn in the children's TV series Kitty Is Not a Cat. In 2019 she recorded a Netflix Original Comedy Special titled Comedians of the World representing New Zealand. She toured a stand-up show, Gifted Underachiever, in 2019. In 2022, Wilson participated in the eighth season of the Australian version of I'm a Celebrity...Get Me Out of Here!. In August that year, it was revealed that Wilson would host the seventh season of The Great Australian Bake Off alongside Natalie Tran and new judges Darren Purchese and Rachel Khoo. The following year in mid-2023, Wilson featured in SBS's Who the Bloody Hell Are You?

During her television career Wilson also made appearances on various Australian comedy shows including SkitHOUSE, Rove Live, Thank God You're Here, Good News Week, Spicks and Specks, The Project, Celebrity Name Game, Show Me the Movie!, Would I Lie to You? Australia, SlideShow, Have You Been Paying Attention? and Hughesy, We Have a Problem.

== Radio ==
In 2007, Wilson co-hosted, with Akmal Saleh, the drive time radio show The Akmal Show with Cal Wilson (later called The Wrong Way Home with Akmal, Cal and Ed), which aired on Nova FM in Sydney, Melbourne, Adelaide and Perth. Before that role, she was a regular guest on the Triple M program Get This.

In 2009, Wilson co-hosted Mornings on Nova 100 (Melbourne) with Dylan Lewis. She resigned from Nova 100 in November 2009.

== Personal life and death ==
Wilson married Chris Woods in 2008. The couple had a son and lived in Sunshine, a suburb of Melbourne.

Wilson died on 11 October 2023, at the Royal Prince Alfred Hospital in Camperdown, Sydney, from a rare and aggressive form of cancer, six days following her 53rd birthday. She had been in hospital for two weeks before her death.

== Filmography ==
Voice roles

- Kitty Is Not a Cat as Petal / Thorn / Rose (2017–2020)
