= TV Guide (New Zealand) =

- Editor: Julie Eley
- Categories: Television listings
- Frequency: Weekly
- First issue: 1983
- Company: Stuff Limited
- Country: New Zealand
- Based in: Auckland
- Website: Official website

TV Guide is a weekly New Zealand magazine that lists the country's television programmes for each week.

== History and profile ==
TV Guide was started in 1983 as a section in Truth newspaper. Within three years it became a separate publication. It is published by media business Stuff Ltd, from its Auckland office.

== Regular features ==
- Stuff to watch – The best of online viewing
- Highlights – The best of the week's viewing
- TV Movies – more information on movies on television this week
- Sport – the sports news
- Mr Telly – readers share their views about what is on television
- This week in history – Things that happened in history for the week covered
- Horoscopes – horoscope for the week
- Puzzle Fun – puzzles
- Kids' Club – Games, puzzles and prizes for children

== Staff ==
- Julie Eley - Editor
- Chris Bush - Deputy Editor
- Kristie Rogers - Art Director
- Sarah Nealon - Journalist
- Melenie Parkes - Journalist
