= Court Theatre (New Zealand) =

Theatre in Christchurch, New Zealand

The Court Theatre

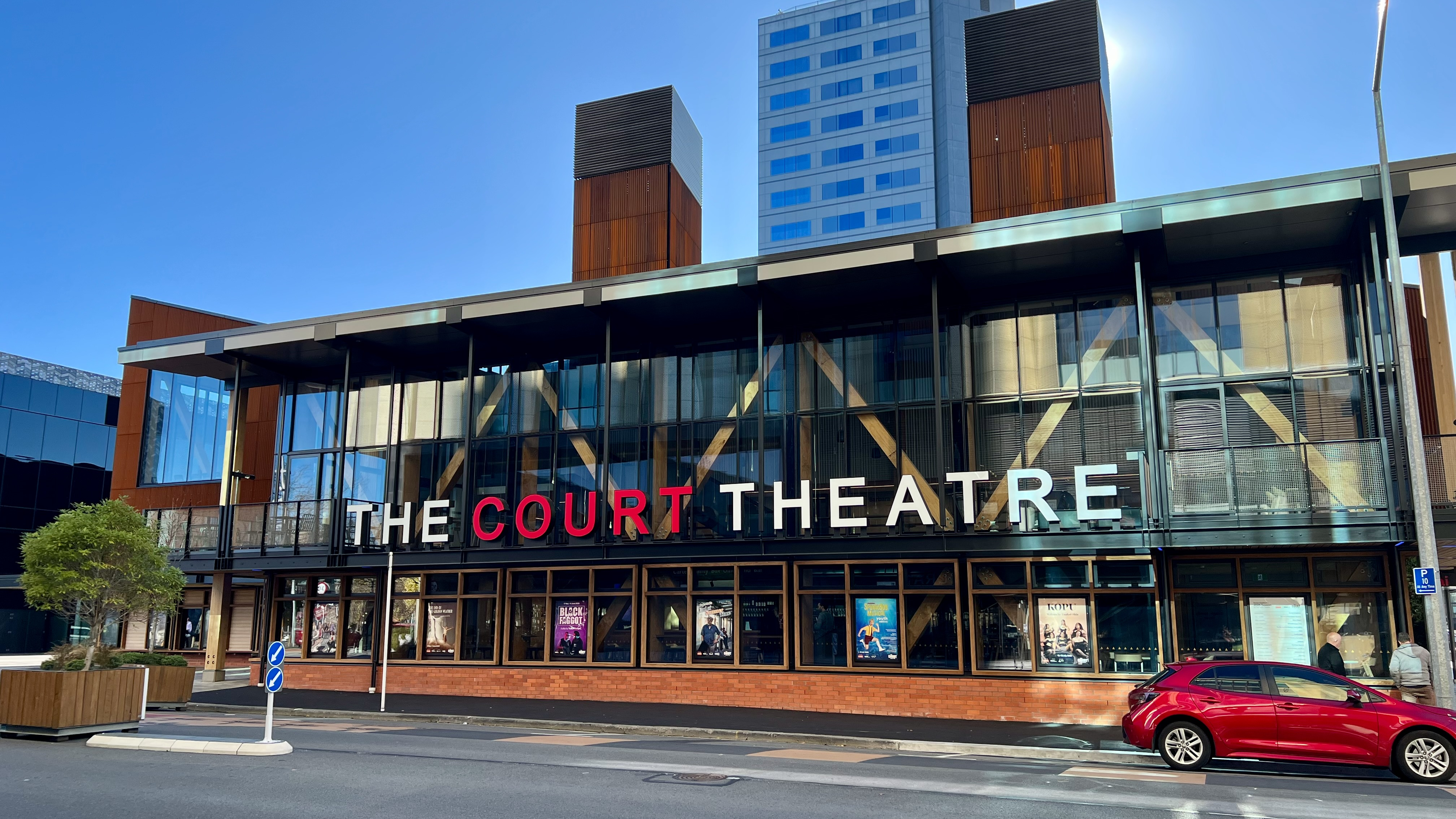
- Interactive map of The Court Theatre
- Address: 129 Gloucester Street; Christchurch; New Zealand
- Coordinates: 43.52957°S 172.63703°E
- Capacity: 778

Construction
- Opened: 1971
- Rebuilt: 2025
- Cost: NZ$61,400,000
- Architects: Haworth Tompkins, Athfield Architects
- Main contractor: Hawkins

Website
- courttheatre.org.nz

The Court Theatre is a professional theatre company based in Christchurch, New Zealand. It was founded in 1971 and located in the Christchurch Arts Centre from 1976 until the February 2011 Christchurch earthquake. It opened new temporary premises in Addington in December 2011. As of 2023 it is New Zealand's largest theatre company. In May 2025 the theatre re-opened at a new purpose-built facility in the Christchurch Performing Arts precinct of the Central City.

== History ==
=== Founding and early years ===
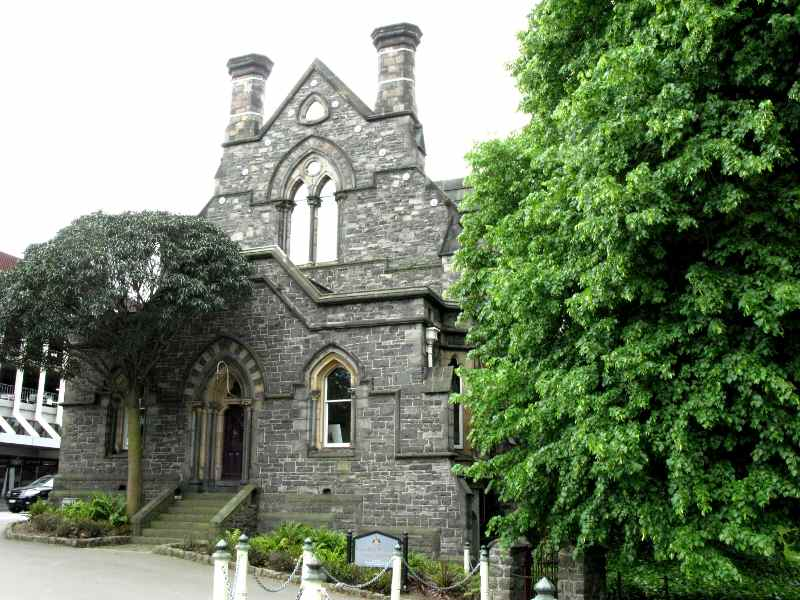
Stone Chamber of the Canterbury Provincial Council

The company was founded by Yvette Bromley QSM and Mervyn Thompson in 1971, who thought Christchurch deserved a professional theatre of a similar calibre to the Auckland Mercury Theatre or the Wellington Downstage Theatre. The pair served as Co-artistic Directors for the first three years of the company. Bromley chose the theatre's name out of affection for the Royal Court Theatre in London, which she knew well from her upbringing and drama education.

During the first eighteen months of its existence, the Court had three venues. The first was the Stone Chamber of the Canterbury Provincial Council Chambers (April–May 1971), where the Court's début production, The Prime of Miss Jean Brodie was staged. Occasionally the Māori Land Court would require the use of the chamber, necessitating the set being struck and taken to the Durham Street Art Gallery; the furniture being moved back into the chamber and the process reversed for the next evening's performance. The Stone Chamber was one of the city's most magnificent structures, but it was impractical for a theatre company, as there was little room for an audience and a lack of toilets.

Next was the Durham Street Art Gallery (June 1971–May 1972), which was used as an interim venue between the Canterbury Society of Arts vacating the premises and the Law Court expanding into the area. From June to August 1972, the Court was housed in the Beggs Theatrette and staged two productions in the space.

The next four years (September 1972–February 1976) were a period of relative stability. The Court Theatre was housed at The Orange Hall on Worcester Street. In 1974, Mervyn Thompson stood down leaving Yvette Bromley as sole artistic director until 1975 when Randall Wackrow (who had joined the company as Business Manager in 1973) joined her as co-director.

=== The Arts Centre ===
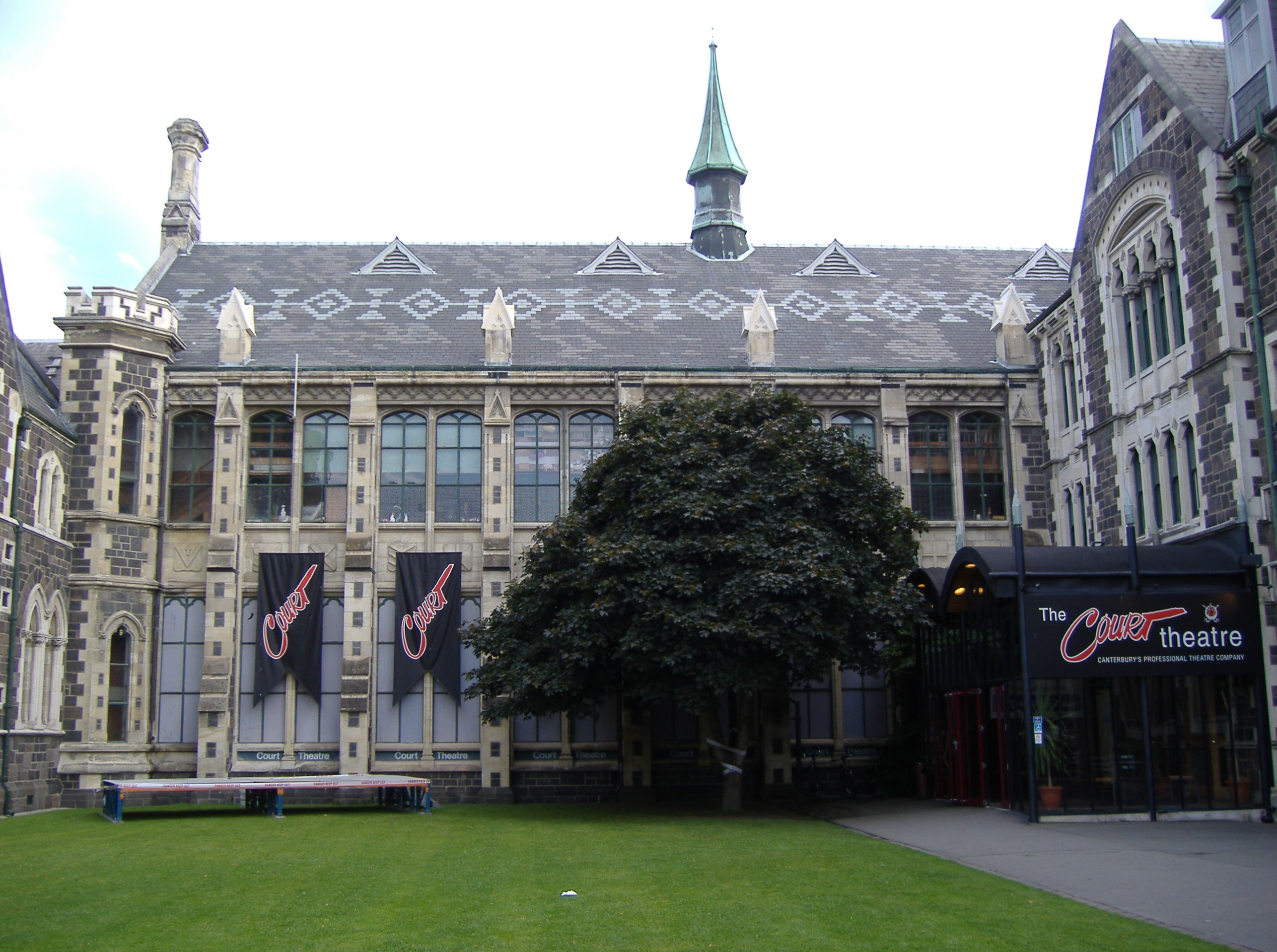
The Court Theatre at the Christchurch Arts Centre

In 1976, the company moved to the Christchurch Arts Centre complex, in the buildings which were formerly the Engineering School of Canterbury College. The performance space was previously lecture room D.

From 1977 to 1978, Randall Wackrow served as sole artistic director, standing down in 1979 with the appointment of Elric Hooper. Hooper served as artistic director for more than two decades. Hooper declared his intent to balance the theatre's repertoire with "three main thrusts — the classic, the contemporary and the indigenous". Financial pressure during the economic slump of the mid-eighties almost caused the closure of the theatre. A small second auditorium, Court Two, was closed almost as soon as it opened, although it was to be later revived as The Forge.

The Court expanded its company with the introduction of Theatresports to Australasia in the late 1980s and the formation of professional improvisation troupe, the Court Jesters, in 1989.

In 1990, Hooper was awarded an MBE and the 1990 Commemoration medal by the Queen. Hooper retired as artistic director in 1999 and Catherine Downes served as artistic director of the Court Theatre from 2000 to 2005. Ross Gumbley became the Court's Artistic Director in 2006 and helped the Court find a new venue in Addington when the 2011 Christchurch earthquake destroyed the Court's Arts Centre venue.

=== The Shed, Addington ===
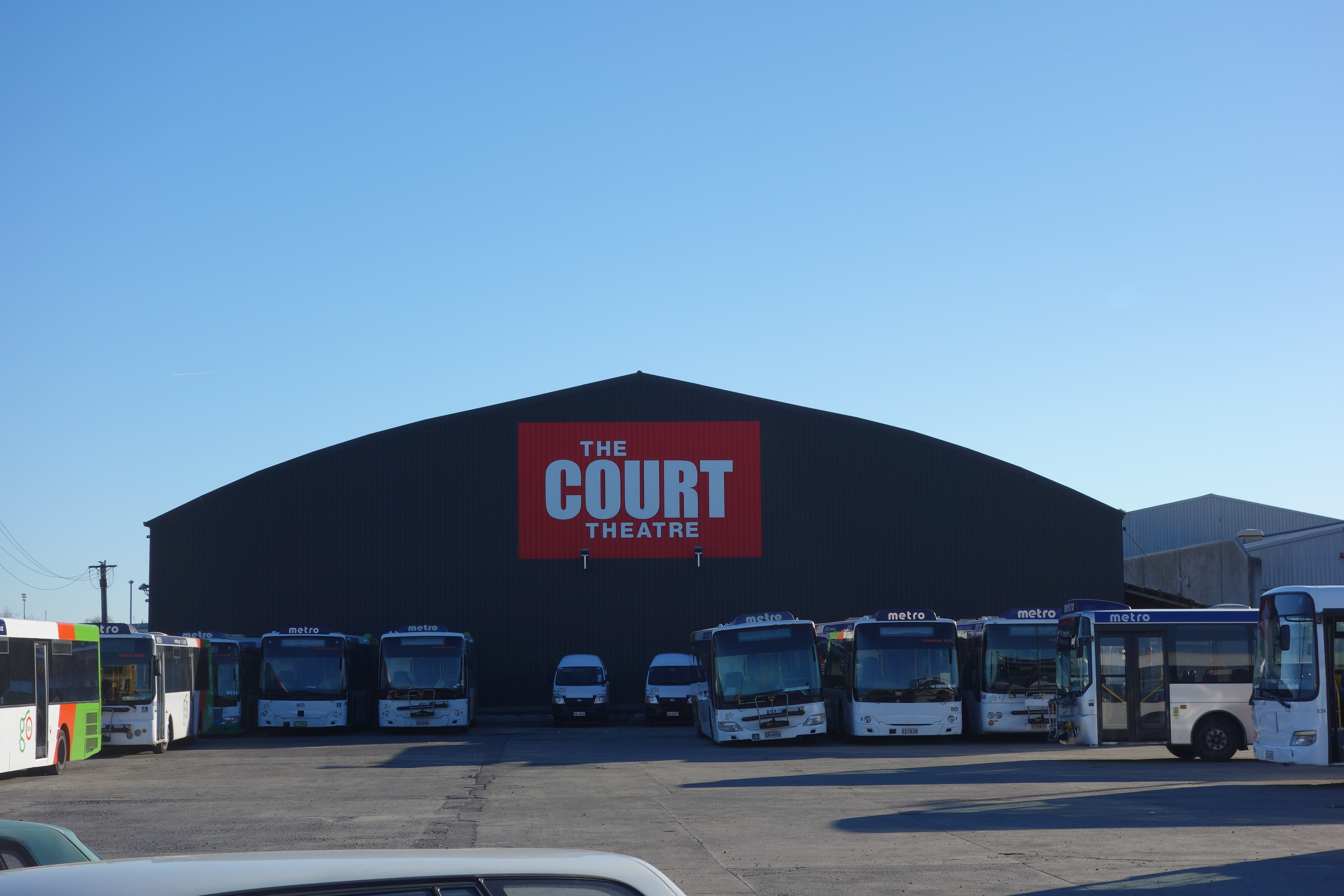
The temporary "Shed" premises in Addington

After the 2011 earthquakes, the Court remained in the Shed while planning for a permanent home in the city. In December 2019, Ross Gumbley became the Court's Artistic Adviser/Lead Director, helping to plan for a new theatre, while Daniel Pengelly took over as Interim Artistic Director. In May 2020, Pengelly was appointed artistic director until 31 December 2020.

During the 2020 COVID-19 pandemic, the Court Theatre's shows were postponed or cancelled. The Court began staging productions in the Shed's foyer with safety measures in place in August 2020 and on 21 September 2020 announced that the main auditorium would be reopening.

In July 2020, the Court entered into a lease agreement with the local council for a new venue in the city centre that was yet to be built. The venue was originally due to open in 2023 but in 2021 it was rescheduled for 2024. In October 2023, The Press reported that the theatre was in a precarious financial position. At that time chief executive Barbara George said that the last profitable show for the theatre had been Jersey Boys in the 2020/21 summer season.

In 2021 a history of the first 50 years of the theatre was published.

In November 2023, George resigned as chief executive following allegations of a culture of bullying within the organisation.

=== Return to the Central City ===
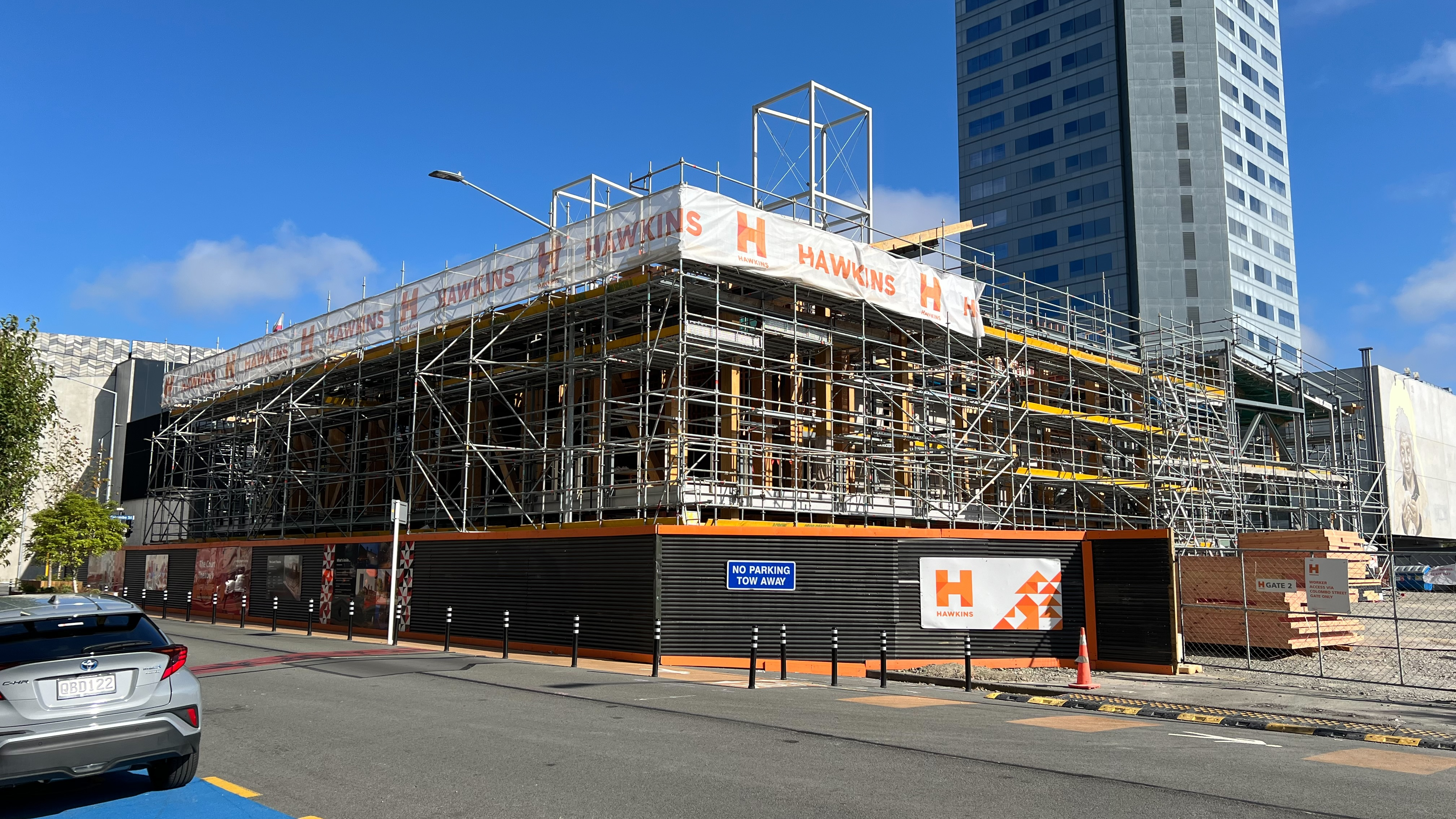
The new Court Theatre under construction in February 2024

As part of the rebuild following the Christchurch 2011 earthquakes, an area north of Cathedral Square was designated the "Performing Arts Precinct", with the intention that it would host a number of performance art venues. The city block, surrounded by Armagh, Colombo, Gloucester and New Regent Streets was already the location of the Isaac Theatre Royal, which was later followed by music venue The Piano. A location in the south-west corner, opposite Tūranga, was chosen for the new Court Theatre building. Design work on the new building began in 2019, with a planned opening date of 2022. Although a design was proposed in 2020, repeated delays pushed the projected opening back to 2023.

The new building was originally budgeted to cost NZ$36,000,000, but in 2022 it ballooned to NZ$56,000,000. The bulk of the funding (NZ$46,000,000) was provided by the Christchurch City Council, with the theatre company itself and supporter donations making up the remainder. The main theatre is designed to have 375 seats, with an additional smaller 130-seat "studio" theatre. Construction firm Hawkins was selected, and construction began in 2023, with the theatre planned to open in late 2024. It was later announced that the opening had been again delayed to May 2025. In February 2025 it was revealed that there was still a NZ$500,000 funding shortfall, and that the construction budget had again increased to NZ$61,400,000. The new theatre opened in May 2025.

== Current role and activities ==
The Court Theatre employs professionals from around the country and internationally. It sustains a full-time professional staff and an ensemble acting company and is administered by the Court Theatre Trust. The new venue opened in 2025 and includes a 375-seat theatre and a 130-seat theatre, plus other multi-purpose spaces. The first production to be programmed in the new venue was The End of the Golden Weather by Bruce Mason.

In addition to being a full-time professional theatre company, the Court Theatre operates numerous other activities in the community. The company annually tours a show regionally around the South Island. Its education programme provides training for school-age students and adults, regularly liaising with high school and tertiary institutions as well as other community groups. The company also produces school holiday kids' shows and an annual touring primary school show.

Furthermore, the company employs a troupe of professional improvisors and corporate entertainers, The Court Jesters. The most public face of their work is the improv comedy show "Scared Scriptless" which is staged every Friday night at 9pm.
