= 1News =

News division of TVNZ of New Zealand

- Presented by: Melissa Stokes (6 pm Sunday - Thursday); Jack Tame (6 pm Friday and Saturday); Jenny Suo (6pm holidays); Mei Heron, Tova O’Brien, Wendy Petrie, Jenny suo, Daniel faitaua (1 news at six back up); Mei Heron (BNZ Business Breakfast); Tova O'Brien and Chris Chang (Breakfast)
- Country of origin: New Zealand

Production
- Camera setup: Multi-camera
- Running time: 6 pm: 60 minutes (including advertisements); Breakfast: 5 min updates every 30 minutes from 6am (including advertisements); Seven Sharp 30 minutes (including advertisements)
- Production company: TVNZ

Original release
- Release: 3 November 1969 – present

1News (Note: Formerly stylised as One News) is the news service of the New Zealand television network TVNZ. Its flagship programme is the daily evening newscast 1News at Six; other programmes include morning news-talk show Breakfast, Te Karere, Seven Sharp, and Sunday morning political affairs program Q+A. TVNZ also operates a news website and app, 1News.co.nz. TVNZ's Chief News and Content Officer, Nadia Tolich, was appointed in April 2025.

Broadcast from its Auckland studios, 1News' nightly 6pm bulletin is usually New Zealand's most-watched television programme and seen as influential. TVNZ operates bureaus in Auckland, Wellington and Christchurch and has foreign correspondents based in Australia, Europe and the United States.

== History ==
Previous "ONE News" logo

Television news in New Zealand began in 1960 with the introduction of television broadcasting. News bulletins were produced separately in Auckland, Wellington, Christchurch and Dunedin, as the country's television stations initially operated independently due to the lack of a permanent national network. Although temporary nationwide links could be established for major events, these required extensive advance planning and could only originate from predetermined locations. National news and current affairs programmes produced in Wellington were copied onto videotape and flown to the other centres for broadcast, often resulting in significant delays.

Plans for a nationwide television network were developed from 1967. The proposed system would link the four main centres using a combination of microwave and off-air relay stations, allowing programmes to be broadcast simultaneously throughout the country from any of the major studios.

The sinking of the passenger ferry Wahine in April 1968 highlighted the limitations of the existing system. Footage filmed in Wellington could not be broadcast simultaneously in other centres, and the extra-tropical cyclone associated with the disaster grounded aircraft, preventing videotapes from being flown around the country for later transmission.

In October 1969 the nationwide TV network was completed, using a mixture of microwave and off-air broadcast links. The first network news broadcast was live on 3 November 1969 at 7:35pm, read by Dougal Stevenson; the programme was called the NZBC Network News. Initially, it was read by Philip Sherry, Dougal Stevenson or Bill Toft on a rotating roster. Because the microwave network was not yet fully complete, footage from outside Wellington had to be inserted by manually switching between transmitter feeds. During these changes, viewers briefly saw a black slide carrying a letter in the top-right corner, usually hidden by television overscan. The letter identified the source channel and signalled transmitters when to switch feeds.

Prior to the building of the Warkworth satellite communications station in 1971, international programmes could not be received live – the footage had to be flown into New Zealand and was often days old.

The NZBC Network News featured many other newsreaders until the NZBC was dissolved in 1975. The programme was then renamed as simply News.

While the NZBC began broadcasting in colour on 31 October 1973, Network News continued to primarily broadcast in black-and-white until the NZBC was dissolved on 31 March 1975. This was to avoid refitting the Wellington studio in Waring Taylor Street with colour equipment while awaiting the move to the new purpose-built Avalon television centre.

=== TV One and TV2/South Pacific Television (SPTV) era (1975–80) ===
TV One began broadcasting on 1 April 1975 and moved its evening news bulletin to 6:30 pm, with Dougal Stevenson or Bill McCarthy reading the news on a rotating roster until 15 February 1980. The launch of TV One also coincided with the opening of the Avalon television centre, allowing the news to broadcast primarily in colour.

TV2 followed suit on 30 June 1975 and its main evening news was initially broadcast at 7 pm before moving to the earlier timeslot of 6 pm by the end of 1975. Jennie Goodwin was the first female newsreader in New Zealand to anchor a nightly television news programme, although Angela D'Audney was the first two years earlier. TV2 was rebranded as South Pacific Television in December 1976 to distinguish itself from the former NZBC channel and within the next year, its main evening news was read by Tom Bradley and Philip Sherry (later replaced by John Hawkesby) until South Pacific Television ceased transmission on 15 February 1980.

=== TVNZ era (1980–present) ===
==== 1980s ====
TV One and South Pacific Television were amalgamated into Television New Zealand on 16 February 1980 and its main evening news continued to broadcast at 6:30 pm on TV One. From 31 March 1980, four regional news programmes were broadcast – one in each of the four main regions: Top Half (Auckland and the upper North Island), Today Tonight (Wellington and the lower North Island and originally the upper South Island), The Mainland Touch (Christchurch, Canterbury and later the upper South Island) and 7:30 South (Dunedin, Otago and Southland). Initially, these programmes aired at 7:30 pm and ran for half an hour in duration.

In February 1982, the main bulletin was revamped and broadcast from 6:30-7:30 pm; the one-hour package incorporated the day's national and international news, regional news programmes and the weather forecast. At the same time, Dunedin's 7:30 South was rebranded as The South Tonight and TVNZ introduced a feature segment called Nationwide; it contained regional items of national interest, as well as "sidebars" – items which, for example, focused on the human interest element of an event outlined in the network news.

In late 1983, Nationwide was dropped, with the main bulletin extended to fill the time and give greater sports news coverage.

During the mid-1980s, Philip Sherry and Tom Bradley shared the role of newsreader on a rotating roster with Richard Long and Tony Ciprian alternately presenting sports news. Weather was presented on alternate nights by Veronica Allum and Sue Scott.

The main bulletin was revamped in November 1986 and renamed as the Network News, with Judy Bailey and Neil Billington initially co-presenting in a double-headed format and replacing Philip Sherry. Tom Bradley moved to weekends, where he alternated with Angela D'Audney as weekend anchor.

In February 1988, sports anchor Richard Long took over from Neil Billington as co-anchor of the Network News, the beginning of a partnership that would continue for much of the next 15 years. Tony Ciprian moved to the new commercial network TV3, the network's first sports producer. He was with 3 News for almost 20 years.

In July 1988, the Network News was moved to 6 pm and renamed as the Network News at Six but the weekend bulletin remained at 6:30 pm (as the Network News and Sport). The moving of the Network News to 6 pm also marked the introduction of computer-generated weather graphics and the arrival of Jim Hickey and Penelope Barr, who replaced Veronica Allum and Sue Scott as weather presenters.

On 3 April 1989 TVNZ launched a new nightly current affairs programme, Holmes, which was presented by Paul Holmes. Holmes began screening at 6:30 pm. At the same time, the duration of the Network News at Six was reduced back to 30 minutes and the regional news programmes were transferred to around 5:45 pm on TV2. The year saw the introduction of TVNZ's first foreign correspondents – Liam Jeory in London and Susan Wood in Sydney.

In October 1989, the weekend Network News and Sport was moved from 6:30 pm to 6 pm.

In November 1989, the Network News was relaunched as One Network News; its renaming due to competition from new broadcasting station TV3's news programme 3 National News.

In December 1989, both Top Half and Today Tonight were axed by TVNZ but The Mainland Touch and The South Tonight continued for another year and screened on TV One at 5:45 pm as a lead-in to One Network News at 6 pm, with support from NZ On Air. The Christchurch and Dunedin based regional news programmes were axed at the end of 1990.

==== 1990s ====
In February 1995, the main bulletin was again extended from 30 minutes to a full hour, screening from the now familiar 6 pm timeslot, followed by Holmes at 7 pm. The change coincided with the unveiling of a new studio set which was used until 2003. On 2 January 1995, the main One Network News bulletin was delayed for 10 minutes after protesters occupied the studio and protested about the Māori language bulletin Te Karere which was off air over the Christmas and New Year period.

July 1997 saw the replacement of weekend news presenters Angela D'Audney and Tom Bradley with husband and wife Simon Dallow and Alison Mau. Bradley resigned, but D'Audney stayed as a backup presenter for other bulletins until her death in 2002.

On 11 August 1997, the early morning Telstra Business and Breakfast shows were first aired; Telstra Business was hosted by Michael Wilson; Breakfast hosted by Susan Wood and Mike Hosking.

In 1998, TVNZ signed 3 National News anchor John Hawkesby to replace Richard Long from the start of 1999. But when Haweskby began presenting One Network News at 6 pm alongside Judy Bailey, there was a public outcry over the separation of Bailey and Long, that lead to Long reinstated as co-anchor at 6 pm three weeks later. Hawkesby later took TVNZ to court, a dispute that he subsequently won.

The programme was renamed again on 31 December 1999 to One News.

==== 2000s ====
On 19 March 2000, TVNZ launched its first digital initiative nzoom.co.nz. Staffed by 20 journalists, nzoom included news, sports, entertainment and home and garden sections, in additional to being a web portal. The website was closed in 2003, and replaced by a more basic offering that was designed to extend television programming. At the time of its closure, it ranked second amongst local online news providers - behind the New Zealand Herald and ahead of Stuff.

2003 saw a major shake up of TVNZ's news and current affairs programming with entering head Bill Ralston making sweeping changes to the formats of many programmes. A new state-of-the-art studio came into use for One News programmes, but many presenters were culled. The changes saw the end of Long and Bailey's 15-year partnership; from January 2004, the main 6 pm bulletin reverted to a single-headed broadcast with Judy Bailey as anchor. Jim Hickey, TVNZ's most popular weather presenter, and sports presenter April Bruce (née Ieremia) also left in 2003. Hickey returned to One News in 2007.

Close Up was launched in November 2004, when Paul Holmes, host of the Holmes programme, resigned following failed contract negotiations. Close Up followed the same format as Holmes, but was hosted by Susan Wood until her sudden resignation in 2006. Mark Sainsbury became the main host following her resignation.

In October 2005, TVNZ announced that it would not be renewing long-standing flagship broadcaster Judy Bailey's contract; some observers believe this was a direct reaction to the programme's market share decline in Auckland to 3 News. An emotional Bailey signed off for the final time at the end of the 6 pm One News bulletin on 23 December 2005. She was TVNZ's longest serving newsreader and had been reporting and presenting with both NZBC and TVNZ for 34 years. When the 6 pm edition of One News returned after the Christmas break of 2005–2006, it reverted to double-headed presentation with Wendy Petrie and Simon Dallow taking over from Bailey. The weekend 6 pm bulletin remained single-headed until September 2008, when popular presenter Peter Williams joined Bernadine Oliver-Kerby as co-anchor.

In 2003 reporter Charlotte Glennie proposed that 1News open a dedicated Asia bureau, and Ralston approved the proposal. Glennie became TVNZ's first Asia correspondent and was based in Hong Kong. She reported on the 2004 Indian Ocean earthquake and tsunami and received the Supreme and Best Senior Reporter awards at the Qantas Media Awards for that coverage. In October 2005 she became the first New Zealand journalist to film officially in North Korea. In 2006 TVNZ closed the Hong Kong bureau, which cost about $500,000 a year, because of budget constraints. Prime Minister Helen Clark criticised the closure at the time.

In December 2008, One News relaunched online news product under the TVNZ.co.nz domain. The broadcaster said it was "upping the ante" for digital offerings.

Sir Paul Holmes returned to TVNZ as the host on the new political programme Q+A in 2009. He hosted the programme until late 2012, when illness prevented him from continuing his duties. He died on 1 February 2013.

On 3 November 2009, TVNZ celebrated One News' 40th birthday with some archival footage available on their website. Later that year, Jennie Goodwin, David Beatson, Dougal Stevenson and Lindsay Perigo returned to read one Breakfast news segment each.

==== 2010s ====
A Saturday edition of Breakfast, called Saturday Breakfast, was broadcast from 3 September 2011, hosted by Rawdon Christie and Toni Street, and ran until the end of 2012, when it and One News at 4:30 were cancelled for financial reasons.

1News was awarded Best News in the Qantas Media Awards from 2008 through 2011 and won Best Breaking News in the New Zealand Film and Television Awards 2012.

In September 2012 an announcement was made that TVNZ would discontinue Close Up at the end of 2012. The final Close Up programme screened on 30 November 2012 and in early 2013, an announcement was made of the replacement show, named Seven Sharp. The first show screened on 4 February 2013.

Former BBC meteorologist Daniel Corbett joined the weather team in September 2014. In December 2014, Jim Hickey left his position as head weather forecaster. Nearly a year later Karen Olsen left the weathercaster position, making her final broadcast on 16 November 2015.

In July 2015, TVNZ rebranded its news website to One News Now, focused specifically on breaking news and video content. The change was expected to double the website's number of video views. Some changes were criticised for an apparent pivot towards "clickbait". In May 2016, TVNZ began syndicating news video with Stuff.

One News programmes were renamed 1News in 2016, when TV One was renamed TVNZ 1.

Corin Dann became political editor in 2012 and held the role until 2018. Jessica Mutch McKay succeeded him.

==== 2020s ====
During the COVID-19 pandemic in New Zealand as part of cost-cutting measures, 1News reverted to a single news presenter for its 6 pm bulletin. Simon Dallow remained as the sole newsreader while Wendy Petrie lost her role. Petrie would remain at TVNZ as a backup presenter across other 1News programmes.

Paul Yurisich, who was appointed to the role of Head of News and Current Affairs in 2020, resigned from TVNZ in 2022 after a review into the hiring of former Al Jazeera presenter Kamahl Santamaria. Phil O'Sullivan replaced Yurisich as the Executive Editor, News and Current Affairs. O'Sullivan had previously been in the role in an acting capacity since June 2022.

In late July 2023, 1News revamped its intro and banner, by changing the colour from blue to black, and moving the name and job to the left side.

In early March 2024, TVNZ proposed ending several television programmes including "1News at Midday" and "1News Tonight" due to a decline in advertisement revenue and competition from digital competitors such as Netflix and YouTube. In addition, TVNZ has proposed 68 job cuts, amounting to about 9 percent of its staff. On 9 April, TVNZ confirmed that 1News' Midday and late night bulletins would be axed by mid-May 2024. Midday broadcast its final bulletin on Friday 3 May 2024, hosted by Indira Stewart.

Mutch McKay stepped down as political editor in 2024, and Maiki Sherman replaced her.

On 7 October 2024, TVNZ's management proposed closing down 1News' website by February 2025 as part of a NZ$30 million cost-saving measure. On 29 October, TVNZ abandoned plans to shut down its 1News website but proposed expanding the news content of its TVNZ+ streaming service.

On 28 November 2025, Simon Dallow stood down as the 1News weekday presenter after 20 years and was replaced by Melissa Stokes who previously served as the weekend 1News presenter, Jack Tame was announced as the new weekend presenter with him working Friday - Saturday rather than weekends like his predecessor. Katie Bradford left the business correspondent role in 2025, and Jason Walls took it over.

On 26 January 2026, 1News updated its template with minor changes to graphics. On 10 May 2026, 1News further advanced its appearance with a new opening, a new desk and a refreshed background including a virtual studio and purple colour scheme instead of their traditional blue. Sherman left the political editor role in 2026.

== News bulletins ==
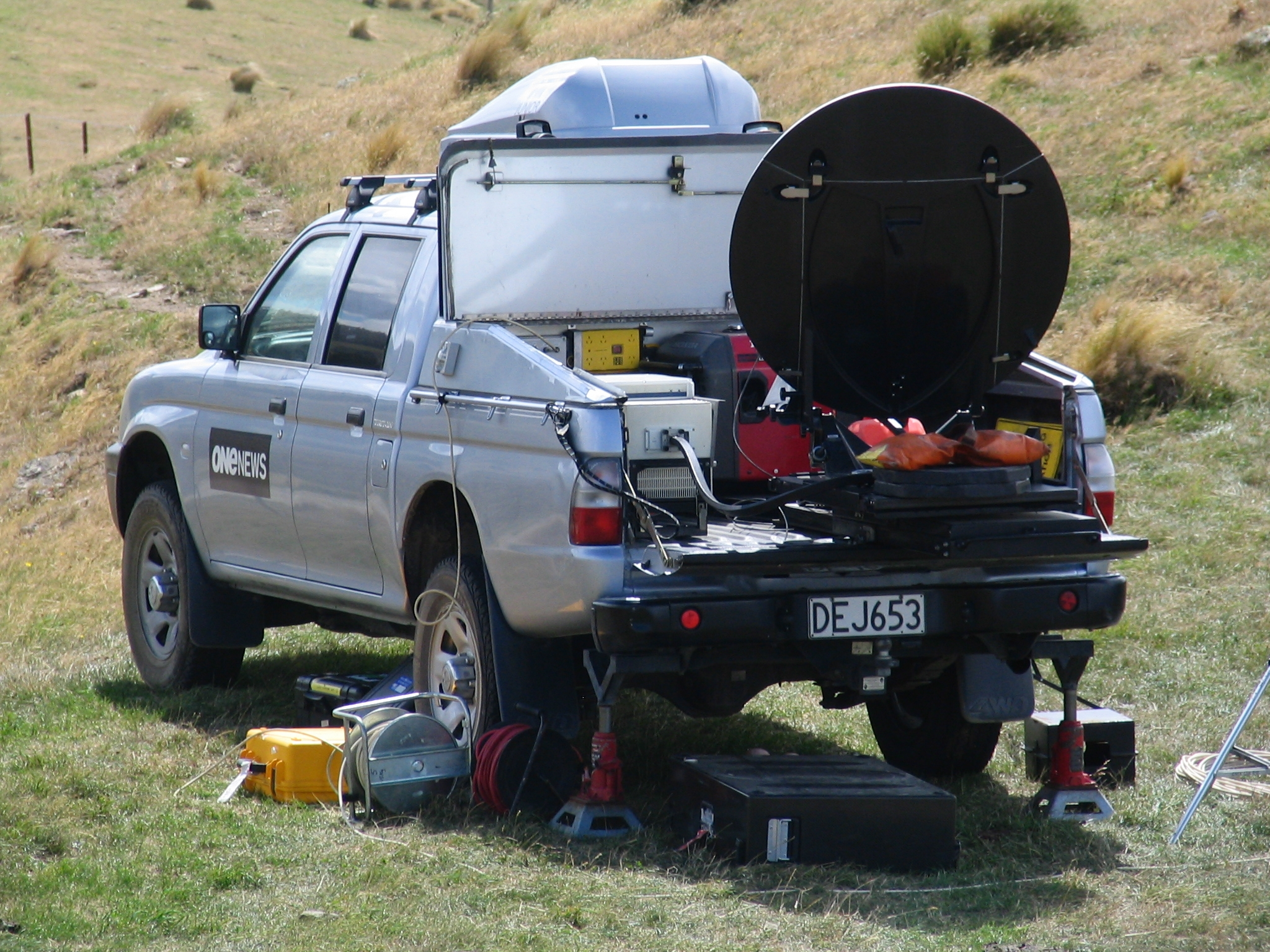
One News telecommunications ute, at the 2010 Mt Allan forest fire

=== BNZ Business Breakfast ===
BNZ Business Breakfast airs at 6:00am, 30 minutes before Breakfast. Mei Heron presents business news and market updates, alongside expert guest interviews.

=== Breakfast ===
Breakfast airs short news, sports and weather updates every half-hour, from 6:30 am until 8:30 am, with both presenters Chris Chang and Tova O'Brien rotating as newsreaders every half an hour.

=== Te Karere ===
Te Karere is a half-hour news programme broadcast at 4 pm weekdays entirely in Māori. It is presented by Scotty Morrison. The weather is also broadcast in Māori. Te Karere regularly attracts between 50,000 – 80,000 viewers a day.

=== 1News at Six ===
1News at Six is 1News' flagship hour-long bulletin, airing nightly at 6pm; it is hosted by Melissa Stokes on weekdays and Jack Tame at weekends. Sport is hosted by Hayley Holt or Andrew Saville, and weather by Daniel Corbett, Erin Conroy or Renee Wright.

The bulletin has five segments separated by advertisement breaks. National and international news stories for the first three segments (approximately 35 minutes), sport news in the fourth segment (approximately 10–15 minutes) with weather at the end. (approximately 8-4 minutes). On Sundays, the weather segment airs earlier to make way for light-hearted news segment Good Sorts.

== Current affairs programmes ==
=== Seven Sharp ===
Seven Sharp is a half-hour current affairs programme which airs at 7 pm each weekday. Presented by Hilary Barry and Jeremy Wells, it features mostly current event or local human interest stories. It was launched in 2013, replacing Close Up and long serving broadcaster Mark Sainsbury.

=== Q+A ===
Q+A is an hour-long political show that airs at 9 am on Sundays. Presented by Jack Tame, it consists of an interview with a politician that has been in the news during the previous week and a panel debate on a political hot topic. Q+A has been screening since March 2009, originally on Sunday mornings; since July 2018, it has been broadcast in primetime. By mid-2020, it returned to its traditional Sunday morning timeslot.

Q+A won Best News/Current Affairs Programme in the 2009 Qantas Media Awards.

=== Business With Breakfast ===
Business with Breakfast is a 30 minute current affairs business show hosted by Mei Heron. The show first aired on May 11 2026. It airs on TVNZ 1 from 6am on weekdays, as a pre-segment show to Breakfast (New Zealand TV programme)

with the full show starting from 6:30am. News is still presented at 6am.

== Discontinued ==
=== 1News at Midday ===
1News at Midday was a half-hour long bulletin that aired at midday each weekday. The final episode of Midday was broadcast on Friday 3 May 2024.

=== 1News Tonight ===
1News Tonight was a half-hour long bulletin that aired at approximately 10:30 pm on TVNZ 1 each weeknight. It competed with Three's Newshub Late. The final episode of Tonight was broadcast on Friday, 10 May 2024.

=== TVNZ News at 8 and TVNZ News Now ===
Discontinued in July 2012, when TVNZ 7 closed down.

=== Business ===
Amalgamated into Breakfast in 2013.

=== Close Up ===
Replaced with Seven Sharp in 2013.

=== One News at 4.30 pm ===
Discontinued in 2013 due to lack of funding.

=== Saturday Breakfast ===
Discontinued in 2013.

== 1News Special ==
1News Special episodes are often aired during international, one-off and breaking news events. For international breaking news stories, 1News often airs a video feed from other news organisations. 1News has aired specials for the following events:

Date	Event
25-26 December 1991	Dissolution of the Soviet Union
26 December 1993	1993 Auckland mid-air collision
31 August 1997	Death of Diana, Princess of Wales
11 September 2001	September 11 attacks
23 March 2005	Texas City refinery explosion
20 December 2007	2007 Gisborne earthquake
11 January 2008	Death of Sir Edmund Hillary
22 January 2008	State funeral of Sir Edmund Hillary
10 April 2010	Smolensk air disaster
4 September 2010	2010 Canterbury earthquake
19 November 2010	Pike River Mine disaster
22 February 2011	2011 Christchurch earthquake
11 March 2011	2011 Tōhoku earthquake and tsunami
30 October 2012	Hurricane Sandy
21 July 2013	2013 Seddon earthquake
15 December 2014	2014 Sydney hostage crisis
9 November 2016	2016 United States presidential election
14 November 2016	2016 Kaikōura earthquake
17 February 2017	2017 Port Hills fires
19 May 2018	Wedding of Prince Harry and Meghan Markle
21 June 2018	Jacinda Ardern gives birth
15 March 2019	Christchurch mosque shootings
9 December 2019	2019 Whakaari/White Island eruption
15 March 2020	First anniversary of Christchurch mosque shootings
23-24 March 2020	COVID-19 pandemic in New Zealand
17 October 2020	2020 New Zealand general election
4 November 2020	2020 United States presidential election
3 September 2021	2021 Auckland supermarket stabbing
9 September 2022	Death of Elizabeth II
19 September 2022	State Funeral of Elizabeth II
14 February 2023	Cyclone Gabrielle
6 May 2023	Coronation of Charles III and Camilla
14 October 2023	2023 New Zealand general election
14 July 2024	Attempted assassination of Donald Trump
5 September 2024	Death of Tūheitia
6 November 2024	2024 United States presidential election
25 November 2025	You, Me, And the Economy - Economic Special
6 December 2025	FIFA World Cup 2026 Final draw

During the COVID-19 pandemic in New Zealand a 1News Special was broadcast most days at 1 pm. During the 1 pm broadcast Director-General of Health Ashley Bloomfield would announce how many new cases of coronavirus were in New Zealand.

=== Annual specials ===
Annual specials are aired for the following events:

- Annual Government Budget announcements.
- Annual special reports such as The Year in Review (which airs on the first Sunday of the year and looks at the previous year).
- Annual New Year fireworks in Auckland.

== Presenters ==
=== 1News at Six ===
==== Weekdays ====
Tenure	Presenter(s)
1969–1975	Bill Toft, Philip Sherry or Dougal Stevenson
1975–1980	Dougal Stevenson or Bill McCarthy for TV One + Jennie Goodwin, Tom Bradley or Philip Sherry for TV2/South Pacific Television
1980–1983	Philip Sherry, Tom Bradley, Jennie Goodwin or Angela D'Audney
1983–1986	Philip Sherry or Tom Bradley
1986–1987	Neil Billington and Judy Bailey
1988–2003	Richard Long and Judy Bailey (John Hawkesby and Judy Bailey for three weeks in early 1999)
2004–2005	Judy Bailey
2006–2020	Simon Dallow and Wendy Petrie
2020–2025	Simon Dallow
2025-present	Melissa Stokes (Monday to Thursday), Jack Tame (Friday)

==== Weekends ====
Tenure	Presenters
1969–1975	Bill Toft, Philip Sherry or Dougal Stevenson
1975–1980	Dougal Stevenson or Bill McCarthy for TV One + Jennie Goodwin, Tom Bradley or Philip Sherry for TV2/South Pacific Television
1980–1983	Philip Sherry, Tom Bradley, Jennie Goodwin or Angela D'Audney
1983–1986	Philip Sherry or Tom Bradley
1986-1995	Tom Bradley or Angela D'Audney
1995–1997	Tom Bradley and Angela D'Audney
1998–1999	Simon Dallow and Alison Mau (Richard Long and Liz Gunn for three weeks in early 1999)
2000	Simon Dallow and Liz Gunn
2001–2003	Simon Dallow and Alison Mau
2004–2008	Bernadine Oliver-Kerby
2008–2015	Peter Williams and Bernadine Oliver-Kerby
2016–2018	Peter Williams
2019–2025	Melissa Stokes
2025-present	Jack Tame (Saturday), Melissa Stokes (Sunday)

== Backup presenters ==
Show		Presenter(s)	Backup presenter(s)
Breakfast		Tova O'Brien; Chris Chang	Ali Pugh; Mei Heron; Wendy Petrie; Jenny Suo
Breakfast News		Tova O'Brien; Chris Chang	Daniel Faitaua; Ali Pugh; Jack Tame
Te Karere		Scotty Morrison	Stephanie Fong; Harata Brown; Rapaera Tawhai
1News at Six	Weekdays	Melissa Stokes	Daniel Faitaua; Indira Stewart; Wendy Petrie; Jenny Suo; Jack Tame; Laura Tupou
1News at Six	Weekends and Holidays	Jack Tame	Melissa Stokes; Daniel Faitaua; Indira Stewart; Jenny Suo; Wendy Petrie
1News at Six	Sport	Hayley Holt or Andrew Saville	Guy Heveldt; Jenny Suo; Chris Chang; Zion Daayl
1News at Six	Weather	Daniel Corbett or Renee Wright	Erin Conroy; Te Rauhiringa Brown
Seven Sharp		Jeremy Wells; Hilary Barry	Melissa Stokes; Haydn Jones; Wendy Petrie; Jenny Suo; Daniel Faitaua

== Reporters ==
As of November 2026, the following presenters and reporters work for 1News, including on Breakfast and Q+A. The table excludes staff on Te Karere and Seven Sharp.

1News presenters and reporters
Name	Role	Programme	Bureau
Aziz Al Sa'afin	Reporter	1News	Auckland
James Ball	Digital reporter	1News	Auckland
Michelle Banks	Sports reporter	1News	Dunedin
Lucy Bendell	Reporter	Breakfast	Auckland
Ryan Boswell	Reporter	1News	Christchurch
Chris Chang	Co-host	Breakfast	Auckland
Logan Church	United States correspondent	1News	New York
Benedict Collins	Senior political reporter	1News	Wellington (press gallery)
Lisa Davies	Reporter	1News	Christchurch
Bianca Day	Digital reporter	1News	Auckland
Tom Day	Political reporter	1News	Wellington (press gallery)
Zion Dayal	Sports reporter	1News	Auckland
Barbara Dreaver	Pacific correspondent	1News	Auckland
Charlie Dreaver	Reporter	1News	Auckland
James Fleury	Reporter	1News	Wellington
Laura Frykberg	Reporter	1News	Wellington
Mei Heron	Presenter	Business Breakfast	Auckland
Gill Higgins	In-depth reporter	1News	Auckland
Emma Hildesley	Digital reporter	1News	Auckland
Jack Hornsell	Digital reporter	1News	Auckland
Justin Hu	Digital reporter	1News	Auckland
Te Aniwa Hurihanganui	Māori affairs correspondent	1News	Auckland
Bonnie Jansen	Sports reporter	1News	Auckland
Jacob Johnson	Australia correspondent (since 2025)	1News	Sydney
Brodyn Knuckey	Sports reporter	1News	Auckland
Demelza Leslie	Reporter	1News	Wellington
Donna-Marie Lever	Reporter	1News	Christchurch
Jared McCulloch	Reporter	1News	Otago
Henry McMullan	Reporter	1News	Hawke's Bay
Thomas Mead	Reporter	1News	Christchurch
Simon Mercep	Reporter	1News	Auckland
Corazon Miller	Reporter	1News	Auckland
Mava Moayyed	In-depth reporter	1News	Auckland
Charlotte Mulder	Reporter	Breakfast	Christchurch
Kate Nicol-Williams	Europe correspondent (since 2025)	1News	London
Cushla Norman	Reporter	1News	Wellington
Tova O'Brien	Co-host (since 2026)	Breakfast	Auckland
Ed O'Driscoll	Reporter	1News	Auckland
Samantha Olley	Reporter	1News	Dunedin
Jordan Oppert	Sports reporter	1News	Christchurch
Whena Owen	Reporter	Q+A	Wellington
Michelle Prendiville	Reporter	1News	Dunedin
Alison Pugh	Reporter	1News	Christchurch
Luke Robinson	Sports reporter	1News	Wellington
Jessica Roden	Reporter	1News	Nelson
Jordyn Rudd	Reporter	1News	Bay of Plenty
Andrew Saville	Sports presenter	1News at Six	Auckland
Katie Stevenson	Reporter	1News	Christchurch
Indira Stewart	In-depth reporter	1News	Auckland
Melissa Stokes	Presenter (weekdays)	1News	Auckland
Jenny Suo	Sports reporter	1News	Auckland
Jack Tame	Presenter (weekends), host	1News, Q+A	Auckland
Louise Ternouth	Reporter	1News	Auckland
Claudia Toxopeus	Reporter	Business Breakfast	Auckland
Sophie Trigger	Political reporter	1News	Wellington (press gallery)
Laura Tupou	Reporter and presenter (since 2026)	1News	Auckland
Abbey Wakefield	Reporter	1News	Wellington
Jason Walls	Business correspondent (since 2025)	1News	Auckland
Kate Wells	Sports reporter	1News	Auckland
Abby Wilson	Sports editor	1News	Auckland
Davina Zimmer	Reporter	Breakfast	Wellington

== Developers ==
=== News resources on 1News ===
- ABC News
- ABC News (Australia)
- BBC News
- Nine News

== See also ==
- List of New Zealand television personalities
