= Q+A =

New Zealand TV political talk show

- Genre: Current affairs
- Presented by: Jack Tame
- Country of origin: New Zealand
- Original language: English

Production
- Executive producer: Alex Braae
- Producers: Irra Lee; Natasha Harris
- Production locations: TVNZ Studio, Auckland, New Zealand
- Running time: 60 minutes

Original release
- Network: TVNZ 1
- Release: 22 March 2009 – present

Related
- Agenda

Q+A is a New Zealand Sunday morning talk show, revolving around politics and current affairs. Since 2019, it has been hosted by Jack Tame. The show airs live from the TVNZ Studio on Sundays from 9:00 to 10:00am on TVNZ 1. Prior to the closure of that channel in 2012, a repeat was broadcast later that day from 9:10pm to 10:00pm on TVNZ 7.

== History ==
Q+A premiered on 22 March 2009, as a replacement for Agenda; like its predecessor, Q+A was initially broadcast as a Sunday morning talk show. The original host of Q+A was Paul Holmes, who held this job until late 2012, when health issues forced him to step down; Holmes died on 1 February 2013. Greg Boyed took over presenting duties during Holmes' illness.

In 2013, Susan Wood became the permanent host of Q+A, which she continued to do until a head injury in 2015 caused her to take leave. 1 News at Six host Simon Dallow was Wood's initial replacement; later in 2015, Greg Boyed returned to the programme, becoming the permanent host alongside Corin Dann, who conducted interviews with politicians. Boyed died on 20 August 2018 and Dann took over as the permanent host until he was replaced by Jack Tame a year later.

In July 2018, Q+A moved to an evening slot, being broadcast at 9:30pm on Sunday evenings; a new title sequence was introduced, along with new graphics. It moved to Monday evenings in February 2019.

In February 2020, Q+A returned to Sunday mornings and changed its title to "Q+A with Jack Tame". It returned to Monday evenings in April but moved back to its traditional Sunday morning timeslot by mid-year.

=== Presenters/reporters ===
- Jack Tame – Presenter (2019–present)
- Whena Owen – Reporter (2016–present)
- Corin Dann – Presenter (2018–2019)
- Jessica Mutch McKay – Presenter (2017–2018)
- Greg Boyed – Presenter (2012, 2015–2017)
- Simon Dallow – Presenter (2015)
- Susan Wood – Presenter (2013–2015)
- Paul Holmes – Presenter (2009–2012)
- Mark Sainsbury – Fill-in presenter

== Format ==
The programme is a mix of long-form live and occasionally pre-recorded interviews, usually conducted by the host. These are discussed in frequent live panel discussions with academics and political commentators among others. Long-form stories filed by reporters are also featured.
