= John Campbell (broadcaster) =

New Zealand journalist and television personality (born 1964)

Toleafoa John Campbell
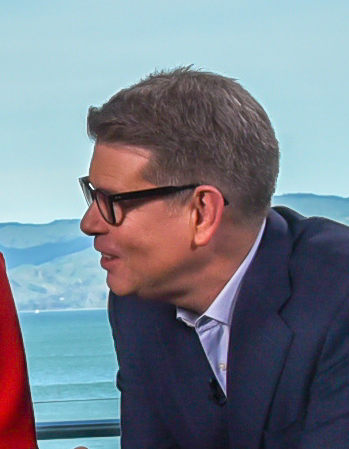
- Campbell in 2019
- Born: John James Campbell; 10 February 1964 (age 62); Wellington, New Zealand
- Education: Victoria University
- Employer: Radio New Zealand

John James Campbell (born 10 February 1964) is a New Zealand journalist and radio and television broadcaster. After starting his journalism career with a Radio New Zealand cadetship, Campbell worked at TV3 for more than 20 years, including roles presenting the flagship bulletin 3 News from 1998 to 2005 and Campbell Live, a daily current affairs programme, until its cancellation in 2015.

From 2018 to 2026, he was a presenter and reporter at TVNZ. From April 2026 he has been a presenter on Radio New Zealand's daily Morning Report programme.

== Early and personal life ==
Campbell was born in 1964; his parents are Jim and Wendy Campbell. He graduated from Wellington College and then from Victoria University with a Bachelor of Arts degree with Honours in English literature.

Campbell is married to documentary editor Emma Patterson. The couple have two children.

== Broadcasting career ==
=== Early career ===
Campbell started broadcasting at Victoria University's Radio Active as a student where, as "Sparky Plug", he provided humorous "alternative rugby commentaries" during All Black games which he now describes as "unbelievably rude" and "grossly defamatory." He then worked as a share trader, providing a share report to Radio New Zealand's Midday Report. In 1989, Radio New Zealand (RNZ) offered him a job as a business reporter. He had no journalism training, but RNZ ran a cadetship system which provided him with the experience he needed. In this role, he read the three-minute news bulletins on the hour.

=== TV3 ===
Campbell moved to TV3 in 1991 as a general reporter in their Wellington newsroom. He moved to their political press gallery a year later. In 1994 he moved to the New Zealand localisation of the current affairs programme 20/20, and later presented an interview/current events segment of 3 News, the network's daily 6 pm newscast.

After John Hawkesby left 3 News in 1998, Campbell was asked to fill in, and he remained as the main 3 News weekday newsreader along with Carol Hirschfeld until 2005. Alongside his early newsreading career, Campbell also hosted the Saturday Morning programme on Radio New Zealand from 2000 to 2002.

In 2002, Campbell was interviewing Prime Minister Helen Clark about the issue of genetically modified corn in New Zealand, dubbed 'Corngate'. The interview ended with Clark labelling Campbell a "sanctimonious little creep" due to what she considered the ambush style of the interview. The Broadcasting Standards Authority later ruled that the infamous "Corngate" interview was unbalanced, unfair and lacked impartiality and objectivity.

Campbell and Hirschfeld made two series of the interview programme Home Truths. In 2004 they made a 12-part series touring New Zealand called A Queen's Tour, following the route of Queen Elizabeth's visit in 1953–1954.

Campbell and Hirschfeld started Campbell Live in March 2005 as a 7 pm current affairs programme competing with TVNZ's Close Up. Core subjects repeated on the programme included political interviews, Christchurch after the earthquakes, child poverty, and the Pike River mine disaster.

On 21 May 2015, TV3 announced that Campbell Live would soon cease to air, and Campbell had decided to leave MediaWorks, despite having been offered a position co-hosting a replacement current affairs programme. Only one year of the offered three-year extension was to have been presenting Campbell Live, and the network was insisting the programme become more entertainment-driven and reduce its concentration on core Campbell Live subjects. The final programme aired on 29 May 2015.

Campbell appeared in cameo roles on scripted programming for TV3, including Love Mussel, the sixth series of Outrageous Fortune and frequently on the animated series bro'Town.

=== Later career ===
Campell's first role after leaving TV3 was as a rugby commentator for Sky Sport during the All Blacks' test against Samoa in July 2015, which was the first time that the All Blacks had played in Samoa and a fixture he had vocally campaigned for while hosting Campbell Live.

Campbell took over as host of the Radio New Zealand current affairs programme Checkpoint in January 2016. His final appearance for Checkpoint was broadcast on 14 September 2018. He subsequently moved to TVNZ, becoming a roving reporter across the company's news and current affairs output, as well as an occasional fill-in presenter on 1News. Campbell made a cameo appearance in the 2016 New Zealand film Hunt for the Wilderpeople.

In April 2019, he joined Breakfast replacing Jack Tame who moved to Q+A. In 2021 Campbell hosted a 1News special Anger, Anxiety & Us which investigated increasing division in New Zealand society.

In April 2022 he announced he was finishing up with Breakfast to take up the new role of TVNZ chief correspondent. That same year, he presented a miniseries titled Under His Command in which he investigated Brian Tamaki and Destiny Church.

In December 2025 he was announced as a presenter on Radio New Zealand's Morning Report, starting in April 2026.

== Awards ==
Campbell has twice won the Qantas Media Award for Best Investigative Current Affairs and for Best Presenter, as well as winning the Best Presenter category twice for the New Zealand Film and Television Awards.

Campbell won the Best Current Affairs Presenter category in the TV Guide "Best on the Box" Awards in 2010, 2011, 2012, 2014 and 2015.

In 2013, Campbell was named a Distinguished Alumnus of Victoria University.

Campbell was named Presenter of the Year 2017 in the Association for International Broadcasting's 13th annual global awards. And in the 2017 New York Festivals World's Best Radio Programs Awards, Campbell won a Bronze Award in the category of Best News Anchor/Reporter.

In 2019, while filming a story in Samoa with producer Adrian Stevanon for TVNZ's Sunday programme, Campbell was awarded the chiefly title Toleafoa by Samoan Head of State Tuimalealiifano Vaaletoa Sualauvi II.

In 2023, Campbell won Best Scoop at the Voyager Media Awards, for his interview with Peter Ellis about the Christchurch Civic Creche case, filmed just days before Ellis died, and three years before Ellis's convictions were quashed by the Supreme Court.

At the 2024 Voyager Media Awards, Campbell (with cameraman Andrew Dalton and editor Dallas Smith) won "Best Current Affairs (long) or Documentary", for their documentary on the forestry "slash" that devastated communities north of Gisborne during and after Cyclone Gabrielle. Campbell won the award for best news or current affairs presenter at the 2025 New Zealand Screen Awards.

== See also ==
- List of New Zealand television personalities

Media offices
Preceded by John Hawkesby	Newsreader of 3 News (with Carol Hirschfeld); 1998–2005	Succeeded by Hilary Barry and Mike McRoberts
New television show	Presenter of Campbell Live; 2005–2015	Show cancelled
