= Jack Tame =

New Zealand broadcaster (born 1987)

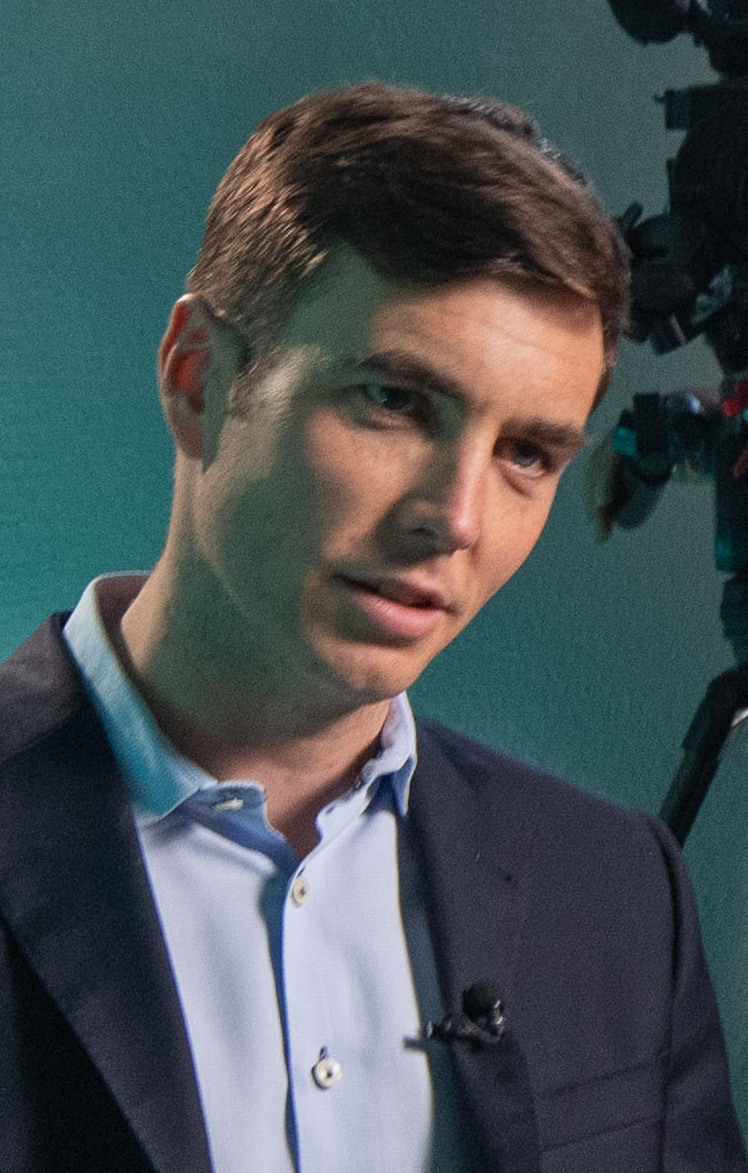
- Tame in 2023
- Born: Jack Renfrey Tame; 4 March 1987 (age 39); Christchurch, New Zealand
- Education: Cashmere High School; CPIT
- Occupation: Broadcaster
- Spouse: Mava Moayyed (m. 2023)

Jack Renfrey Tame (/teɪm/; born 4 March 1987) is a New Zealand television and radio journalist and presenter. He is the host of TVNZ’s political show Q+A and a presenter at Newstalk ZB and 1News.

== Early life and family ==
Tame was born in Christchurch, on 4 March 1987, the son of Linda Tame, a high-school teacher, and John Tame, an accountant. He is the eldest of the four siblings. His mother was the principal of Lincoln High School for 17 years until 2013, and later was relieving principal at Linwood High School in Christchurch, and head of Golden Bay High School from 2018 to 2023; in the 2014 New Year Honours, she was awarded the Queen's Service Medal, for services to education.

Tame was educated at St Martin's Primary School and Cashmere High School in Christchurch, before graduating from the New Zealand Broadcasting School at CPIT (now Ara Institute of Canterbury).

== Career ==
Tame began an internship with TVNZ at the age of 19, reporting for 1News and Breakfast. He worked as the network's United States correspondent, based in New York City from 2012 to 2017. Tame returned to New Zealand in 2017 to begin hosting Breakfast alongside Hilary Barry. He left Breakfast in 2019 to host TVNZ's weekly political interview programme Q+A.

Tame has also been a columnist for the Herald on Sunday and a fill-in presenter for Newstalk ZB's weekday radio programme Mike Hosking Breakfast. He has hosted Saturday Morning with Jack Tame on Newstalk ZB since 2013, taking over the time slot previously held by Sir Paul Holmes.

After Simon Dallow stepped down as lead presenter of 1News at Six on 28 November 2025, Melissa Stokes was appointed as weeknight presenter while Tame became the programme's weekend presenter.

== Personal life ==
Tame married fellow TVNZ reporter, Mava Moayyed, in 2023. He is a stepfather to her son and they have another child together.

== See also ==
- List of New Zealand television personalities
