= Greg Boyed =

New Zealand television presenter (1970–2018)

- Boyed in 2016
- Born: Gregory Stephen Boyed; 27 March 1970
- Died: 20 August 2018 (aged 48); Switzerland
- Occupation: Television presenter
- Spouse: Caroline Chevin (m. 2014)
- Children: 2 (1 with Chevin)

Gregory Stephen Boyed (27 March 1970 – 20 August 2018) was a New Zealand journalist and television presenter. He was best known as the presenter of TVNZ 1's 1News Tonight; he also hosted Breakfast, 1 News At 6pm, Q+A, and Seven Sharp.

== Career ==
=== Radio ===
In 1991, Boyed worked as the chief reporter and newsreader at a radio station in Tauranga. He worked for Independent Radio News (IRN) for four years – as the news and sport reporter and reader in Wellington for the first year, and as sports sub and reader in Auckland for the remaining three. Towards the end of his career, he sometimes worked as a stand-in presenter at Newstalk ZB.

=== Television ===
Boyed's first television work was as a general reporter for ATV regional television, where he then moved into the niche of business reporter for The NBR Report.

Upon moving to TVNZ, Boyed worked as a fill-in business reporter and general reporter. In the late 1990s, he moved to TV3, where he worked as the Auckland reporter for the investigative programme Target. Boyed returned to TVNZ in 2002, initially as a producer on youth news programme Flipside, later becoming executive producer of discussion programme The Last Word, and for a period, the late night news bulletin Tonight. In 2005, he became a reporter for the investigative consumer affairs programme Fair Go.

From 2007 to 2018, Boyed was the main presenter of the late evening 1 News Tonight bulletin, as well as being a regular stand-in on 1 News at Six; he briefly left this job in 2013, moving to newly-launched current affairs programme Seven Sharp, which he presented alongside Alison Mau and Jesse Mulligan. He left the programme seven months after its launch, returning to 1 News Tonight. He also presented TVNZ 7's News at 8 on weekdays from 2008 until the channel's closure in 2012. After the retirement of Paul Holmes in 2012, Boyed temporarily became the presenter of current affairs interview show Q+A; after a revamp of the programme in 2015, he took this job permanently. He was also an occasional stand-in presenter on current affairs show Close Up.

== Personal life ==
Boyed was the son of Colin and Jean Boyed. He met Swiss singer-songwriter Caroline Chevin in 2014 while she was visiting New Zealand, and they married in Switzerland later that year. Their son Kian Iraia Cassidy was born in 2015. He also had a daughter, Sarah, born around 1997, from his first marriage.

Boyed was previously engaged to television presenter Amanda Gillies.

He had an interest in drums and marathon running.

His family reported that he suffered from depression.

== Death ==
Boyed died by suicide on 20 August 2018, while on a family holiday in Switzerland.

== See also ==
- List of New Zealand television personalities
