= Charlotte Glennie =

New Zealand journalist

Charlotte Glennie (born c. 1972) is a New Zealand journalist, who became the first Asia correspondent for Television New Zealand. She reported on the 2004 Indian Ocean earthquake and tsunami that followed, and won the Supreme and Best Senior Reporter Qantas Media Awards, and the New Zealand Special Service Medal (Asian tsunami) for her coverage. She then became the China correspondent for the Australia Network. Following that Glennie freelanced for the BBC at its Asia hub in Singapore, then worked for UNICEF Australia and The Smith Family. Most recently she has written the best-selling memoir Every Second Counts about journalism, including a professional and personal account of her career, published by Moa Press and Hachette in March, 2026.

== Early life and education ==
Glennie grew up in Auckland, where she attended the Diocesan School for Girls. The school presented her in 2006 with a Women2Watch award for former pupils. She has Bachelor of Laws and Bachelor of Arts degrees from the University of Otago, and a Diploma in Journalism from the Auckland University of Technology in 1995.

== Journalistic career ==
She has worked as a radio newsreader, and covered New Zealand's first MMP election in 1996 as a reporter in the parliamentary press gallery.

Reporting for Close Up, she covered the first visit of a New Zealand warship to a Russian port on 10 June 2005. To film the visit, she accompanied the Royal New Zealand Navy from Nagoya, Japan, travelling aboard HMNZS Endeavour and HMNZS Te Mana to the port of Vladivostok. During the voyage she was transferred via rope between the two New Zealand vessels. In October 2005, Glennie visited North Korea, and became the first New Zealand journalist to film there officially. For ONE News she covered the execution of Van Tuong Nguyen, reporting live outside Changi Prison.

In 2006, TVNZ closed down the $500,000-a-year Hong Kong–based Asia bureau due to budget constraints. TVNZ Head of News and Current Affairs Bill Ralston made Glennie an offer to run the bureau from New Zealand, but she declined, deciding to remain working as a journalist in Asia. The Australia Network employed her in June 2006, and as of 2008 she was their China correspondent based in Beijing. In this role she covered the 2008 Sichuan earthquake, and reported on the 2008 Summer Olympics including air pollution, algae at the sailing venue, and preparations of the Chinese athletes. Members of her crew were assaulted outside a university in Xining, near Tibet, on 19 March 2008, while attempting to talk to some students; someone claiming to be the director of the university attacked both her interpreter and camera operator.

== Personal life ==
She suffered a serious accident in Dubrovnik, Croatia, on 4 July 2001, falling 8 m down a cliff near a seaside swimming pool. The fall came at the conclusion of a 10-month personal tour travelling from New Zealand to London through Asia. Ambulance officers airlifted Glennie to hospital with multiple injuries including an open fractured femur. Her parents flew in to see her while she received surgery and treatment at the hospital in Dubrovnik. She transferred by private jet to Wellington Hospital in London, and later flew back to New Zealand to spend several weeks in Auckland City Hospital.
