= Jessica Mutch McKay =

New Zealand television reporter and political editor (born 1984 or 1985)

- Born: Jessica Mutch; 1984 or 1985 (38 or 39 years old)
- Citizenship: New Zealand

Jessica Mutch McKay (born 1984 or 1985) is a New Zealand television reporter and political editor.

== Career ==
Between 2006 and 2013, Mutch McKay worked as a gallery reporter.

Mutch McKay joined TVNZ in 2008. There she covered several New Zealand elections and by-elections, and elections from other countries such as the 2007 Australian election and the 2012 United States election. She was the 1News Europe correspondent between 2013 and 2015. She returned to New Zealand in 2012 to host Q+A, a weekly politics talk show. She left this role in 2018 to become TVNZ's political editor. During the COVID-19 pandemic Mutch McKay led political coverage of the government's response to the pandemic, as well as the Wellington protest. She covered the 2023 general election, co-hosting the election night coverage for TVNZ, and hosted and moderated two debates between the leaders of National and Labour: Christopher Luxon and Chris Hipkins. Mutch McKay announced her departure from TVNZ in early 2024 to work for ANZ as the head of government relations and corporate responsibility.

== Personal life ==
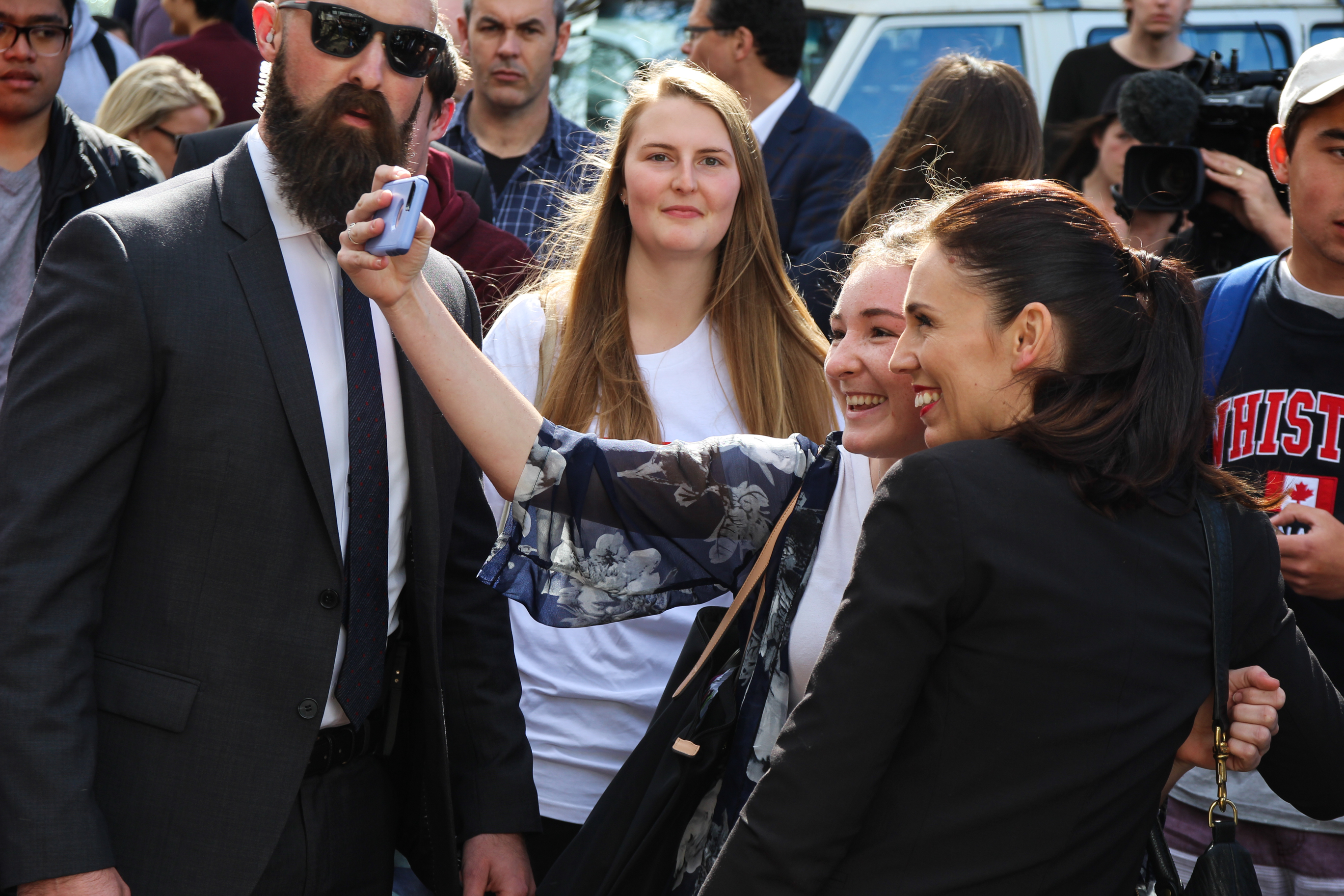
Mutch McKay's husband (left) and Ardern (right)

In 2015 Mutch started dating Iain McKay. He is a bodyguard in the Diplomatic Protection Service, who has protected prime ministers Sir John Key, Bill English and Jacinda Ardern. Mutch and McKay were married in August 2018 on Waiheke Island. Matty McLean was the celebrant.

Mutch McKay became a mother in October 2019, to a daughter.
