= Holmes (TV series) =

- Title Card, 1997
- Starring: Paul Holmes (1989–2005); Susan Wood (backup presenter) (1989–2004)
- Country of origin: New Zealand

Production
- Camera setup: Multi-Camera
- Running time: 30 minutes (with commercials)

Original release
- Network: TV ONE (1989–2004); Prime (2005)
- Release: 3 April 1989 – 2 November 2004

Holmes is a 30-minute news and current affairs show presented by Paul Holmes on Television One in New Zealand that aired between 1989 and 2004. The show moved to Prime in 2005 after failed contract negotiations between Paul Holmes and TVNZ, however the show's run on Prime was short-lived due to low ratings.

== Show history ==
The Holmes show first screened on Television One at 6:30pm following the 6pm news. The 6pm news slot was actually changed to make way for the Holmes show, previously the 6pm news show was 1 hour long with a 20-minute break between the sports news and weather to screen a regional news show for each of the four main centres. The regional news shows were moved to before the 6pm news and later axed. The only competing show at the time was Neighbours, screened on the only other channel Channel 2. At the end of 1989 Holmes also competed against 3 National News on the newly launched TV3.

Holmes' first TV segment featured guest Dennis Conner, the America’s Cup skipper. After being provoked, Conner walked off the set, providing Holmes with headlines the next day.

In 1995, Television One extended their 6pm news to a one-hour show following a move made by TV3 in 1991. From 1995 to 2004 the Holmes shows main competing show was Shortland Street on TV2. TV3 typically screened repeats of popular shows such as Home Improvement or The Simpsons in this time slot.

=== Move to Prime ===
On 2 November 2004, Paul Holmes resigned from TVNZ after failed contract negotiations with TVNZ. TVNZ would not renew Holmes' contract for more than six months; instead Holmes accepted an offer to present a similar show on Prime screening at the same time slot. TVNZ immediately took Holmes off the air and replaced his nightly show with Close Up, originally presented by Susan Wood. Close Up followed a similar format to the Holmes show.

The move to Prime also sparked a current affairs war between the networks with TV3 announcing their new current affairs show Campbell Live, presented by John Campbell due to start in March 2005.

Holmes began his first show on Prime on 7 February 2005; the new show was originally titled Paul Holmes. In February 2005, the show rated 7.1 percent for its timeslot, compared with his former programme on TV One (renamed Close Up) at 31 percent share. In March 2005, following the launch of rival show Campbell Live on TV3, Nielsen Media Ratings listed Holmes' show at 4 percent. Holmes now had to compete with Close Up on TV One, Shortland Street on TV2 and Campbell Live on TV3. Four months after the show moved to Prime a decision was made to move Holmes to 6pm following the 5:30pm news on Prime. This change proved fatal as the show could simply not compete with the 6:00pm news on both TV One and TV3.

On 8 August 2005, almost six months to the day after the show launched, it was axed by Prime Television, with Prime chief executive Chris Taylor citing poor ratings and inability to attract viewers from the traditional primetime news strongholds of TV One and TV3. The show returned in a weekly format in late 2005 and in 2006 was revamped into an hour long chat show similar to the popular UK show hosted by Michael Parkinson.

Paul Holmes returned to TVNZ in 2009 to present political talk show Q+A on TV One. Holmes died in 2013.
