= Agenda (New Zealand TV programme) =

1999 New Zealand TV programme

- Genre: Current affairs
- Directed by: Gray Taylor
- Presented by: Rawdon Christie
- Country of origin: New Zealand
- Original language: English

Production
- Executive producer: Richard Harman
- Producer: Duncan Wilson (Wellington) Lottta Dann (Auckland)
- Production locations: TVNZ Centre Auckland, New Zealand
- Editor: Victoria Fox
- Running time: 60 minutes

Original release
- Network: TV One
- Release: 1999 – 2009

Agenda is a New Zealand hour-long current affairs television programme. It screened at 10 am on Sundays on TV One. Its final host was Rawdon Christie with political interviews conducted by Guyon Espiner. Christie and Espiner were joined each week by three panelists from the New Zealand media.

In late November 2008 TVNZ announced they would not continue their contract with Frontpage, the producers. Despite speculation that another network might buy the rights, the programme was discontinued in 2009 and Q+A replaced it in the Sunday morning slot.

== Format ==
The show began with Rawdon Christie talking to that week's panelists about the main political events of the previous week. Later on, Guyon Espiner begun interviewing their guests, after which the panelists ask the guest their own questions. Following an ad break, there is the dairy segment and an in-depth look into a major political event before another interview. The show concluded with a book giveaway.

- Every week near the beginning of the show a pre-recorded segment by the NZ Listener's Jane Clifton running through what has happened in the political week.
- Also every week a reporter would visit a dairy and talk to the owner about a significant event that has occurred in their area.
- Each week a student from the University of Auckland would present the results from a student panel that separates political fact from fiction.

== Panellists ==
- Vernon Small, political editor of The Dominion Post
- John Roughan, assistant editor of The New Zealand Herald
- Andrew Holden, editor of The Press
- Virginia Larson, North & South editor
- Bernard Hickley, freelance commentator and blogger
- Kathryn Ryan, host of Radio New Zealand national's Nine to Noon
- Nevil Gibson, editor in chief of the National Business Review
- Colin Espiner, political editor of The Press and Guyon Espiner's brother
- Chris Trotter, managing editor of the Political Press and columnist
- Richard Long, columnist for Fairfax
- David Beatson, formerly directly involved in the media and politics
- Chris Baldock, the editor of the Sunday News
- Brian Fallow, economics editor of The New Zealand Herald
- Brent Edwards, Radio New Zealand's political editor
- Deborah Hill Cone, freelance journalist
- Dr Colin James, veteran political journalist
- Barry Soper, Newstalk ZB political editor
