= Seven Sharp =

New Zealand TV programme

- Presented by: Hilary Barry; Jeremy Wells
- Country of origin: New Zealand
- Original language: English
- No. of series: 6
- No. of episodes: 1560

Production
- Executive producer: Paul Moor
- Producer: Andrew Hallberg
- Editors: Sam Thomas; Kirsten Bolam
- Camera setup: Multi-camera
- Running time: 30 minutes (with commercials)
- Production company: TVNZ

Original release
- Network: TVNZ 1
- Release: 4 February 2013 – present

Related
- Close Up

Seven Sharp is a half-hour-long New Zealand current affairs programme produced by TVNZ. The programme was created after the discontinuation of Close Up. It broadcasts at 7 pm (straight after 1 News at Six) every weekday on TVNZ 1. Seven Sharp typically presents 3 stories within a 30-minute timeslot every weeknight, and is designed to be more integrated with social media and real time opinions than its predecessor.

Seven Sharp also shares its time slot with sister channel TVNZ 2's drama Shortland Street, and Prime's The Crowd Goes Wild.

The show is currently presented by Hilary Barry and Jeremy Wells. Toni Street and Mike Hosking left the show in December 2017. Previous fill-in presenters have included Pippa Wetzell, Melissa Stokes, Sam Wallace, Tim Wilson, Carolyn Robinson, Erin Conroy, Stacey Morrison, Heather du Plessis-Allan, Te Radar, Clarke Gayford, Tāmati Coffey, Matt Gibb, Chris Cairns, Brendon Pongia and Rose Matafeo. On one occasion, American actor Rob Schneider appeared as co-host.

The show's primary sponsor is ASB Bank.

== Panelists ==
Former logo

Presenter	Role	Tenure
Hilary Barry	Presenter	2018–
Jeremy Wells	Presenter	2018–
Toni Street	Backup presenter	2018–
Toni Street	Presenter	2014–2017
Anika Moa	Backup presenter	2018
Mike Hosking	Presenter	2014–2017
Pippa Wetzell	Backup presenter	2015–
Melissa Stokes	Backup presenter	2016–
Nadine Chalmers-Ross (now Higgins)	Backup presenter	2015
Jesse Mulligan	Presenter	2013–2014
Alison Mau	Presenter	2013
Greg Boyed	Presenter	2013

== History ==
=== Series 1 (2013) ===
Seven Sharp premiered on 4 February 2013, with Alison Mau, Jesse Mulligan and Greg Boyed at the desk. The episode featured an interview with Josh Groban and a tour of Prime Minister John Key's office. There are 230 episodes in the first series.

Ratings fell to just under 401,000 viewers for the second episode on 5 February, and hovered between 300,000 and 400,000 for the next week. On 12 February, Campbell Live beat Seven Sharp in the ratings with Campbell Live gaining 346,850 viewers compared to Seven Sharp only gaining 290,710 viewers. This was the first time Campbell Live had ever gained a higher audience than TV One for the 7 pm–7:30 pm timeslot.

Greg Boyed left the show on 6 September, and returned to hosting Tonight.

Alison Mau left on the final episode of the series, to host a show on Radio Live with Willie Jackson from noon to 3 pm on weekdays.

=== Series 2 (2014) ===
The second series of Seven Sharp premiered on 27 January 2014 with Mike Hosking, Toni Street, and Jesse Mulligan at the desk, and has 230 episodes.

On 7 February, there was no episode because the IRB Sevens was aired in the timeslot.

On 8 April, the show gained just over 500,000 viewers – the first time the audience number has gone above that of the debut episode.

Jesse Mulligan left the Seven Sharp panel on 17 April, and TVNZ announced that it wouldn't hire another host. This changed the show from the three-presenter format it had held since its inception to a two-presenter format.

On 18 April there was no episode because it was Good Friday (despite an episode being aired on Good Friday in 2013).

On 28 August, 5 September, and 17 September, Seven Sharp was not aired, instead, the 7 pm timeslot was used to broadcast the One News leaders' debates regarding the 2014 New Zealand general election, moderated by Seven Sharp host Mike Hosking. The first debate was between current Prime Minister John Key and Leader of the Opposition David Cunliffe, the second between the leaders of eight minor parties, and the third between Key and Cunliffe.

=== Series 3 (2015) ===
The third series of Seven Sharp premiered on 2 February 2015, and has 229 episodes.

On 6 February, there was no episode because the IRB Sevens was aired in the timeslot.

While Street was on maternity leave in mid-2015, her position was filled by Pippa Wetzell on Mondays–Thursdays and Nadine Chalmers-Ross (now Higgins) on Fridays.

=== Series 4 (2016) ===
The fourth series of Seven Sharp premiered on 1 February 2016, and has 231 episodes.

On 25 March, there was no episode because it was Good Friday.

=== Series 5 (2017) ===
The fifth series of Seven Sharp premiered on 7 February 2017, and has 217 episodes.

No episodes aired on 14 or 17 April due to Easter. There was also no episode on 5 June due to Queen's Birthday.

On 31 August, 8 September, and 20 September, Seven Sharp was not aired, instead, the 7 pm timeslot will be used to broadcast the 1 News leaders' debates regarding the 2017 New Zealand general election, moderated by Seven Sharp host Mike Hosking. The first debate was between current Prime Minister Bill English and Leader of the Opposition Jacinda Ardern, the second between the leaders of minor parties, and the third between English and Ardern. Hoskings' appointment as the moderator was controversial; a 76,000 petition to remove him as moderator was signed and delivered to TVNZ's head of news and current affairs John Gillespie. Due to Hosking's illness, Corin Dann moderated the minor party debate.

There was no episode on 23 October for Labour Day.

On 14 December (during the year's penultimate episode), Street and Hosking announced that they would be leaving Seven Sharp at the end of year due to their breakfast radio commitments.

=== Series 6 (2018) ===
The sixth series of Seven Sharp premiered on 5 February 2018, with new hosts Hilary Barry and Jeremy Wells, and has 226 episodes. In April 2018, a house was burnt down live on air with the goal of teaching people about fire safety. Lucas de Jong and camera operators remained inside when the fire was lit.

=== Series 7 (2019) ===
The seventh series of Seven Sharp premiered on 21 January 2019, and has 197 episodes (as of 30 October 2019).

=== 2023 ===
On the episode of 15 August 2023 in collaboration with Fire and Emergency New Zealand, a controlled house fire was carried with the purpose of teaching viewers about dangers of lithium-ion batteries and how quickly fires spread, it was started from an electric scooter. The house was in Levin, and was designated for demolition before the broadcast.

== Reception ==
Seven Sharp was criticised around its inception for its new format, with some media commentators saying that "TVNZ [had exchanged Close Up's] current affairs for a mess of pottage".

== Controversy ==
=== Broadcasting standards breaches ===
In December 2013, the Broadcasting Standards Authority (BSA) upheld a complaint against Seven Sharp for unfair treatment of Conservative Party leader Colin Craig in a segment aired on 24 April 2013. The programme included a comedic skit by presenter Jesse Mulligan that described Craig with terms such as “nutcase,” “doofus,” and “smarmy rich prick,” which the Authority found amounted to personal abuse rather than legitimate satire. While remarks in a 17 April broadcast were found to be acceptable satire on Craig's political views, the later segment was ruled to have breached fairness standards. The BSA ordered TVNZ to broadcast a statement including an apology and to pay $1,500 in costs to the Crown.

In December 2017, the BSA upheld a complaint against Seven Sharp following a segment aired during the 2017 general election period. During the 23 August broadcast, presenter Mike Hosking incorrectly stated that voters not enrolled in a Māori electorate could not vote for the Māori Party, a statement the BSA found to be factually inaccurate and materially misleading. Although Hosking attempted to clarify his comment on the following night’s programme, the BSA ruled that the clarification was insufficient and potentially confusing. Given the public importance of accurate information during elections, the Authority ordered TVNZ to broadcast a corrective statement, finding that Hosking’s remarks had the potential to mislead viewers about their voting rights.
