= Wendy Petrie =

New Zealand television presenter

- Born: August 1971 (age 55)
- Occupation: Broadcast journalist
- Employer: TVNZ
- Known for: 1News at Six
- Children: 3
- Website: https://www.tvnz.co.nz/one-news/reporter/wendy-petrie

Wendy Petrie (born August 1971) is a New Zealand journalist and television presenter, best known for presenting 1 News at Six alongside Simon Dallow, a role she held for fourteen years from 2006 to 30 August 2020.

== Career ==
Petrie began her journalism career in radio, as a writer for Independent Radio News bulletins. She later joined TV3, where she worked variously as a reporter, news anchor and weather presenter on 3 News, as well as being a regular fill-in host on late night news programme Nightline.

Petrie moved to Canada in 2001, becoming a newsreader for CTV NewsNet and a substitute newsreader on the CTV morning programme Canada AM. During her time in Canada, she reported on the September 11 attacks for 3 News.

In late 2003, Petrie returned to New Zealand and joined TVNZ, initially as a fill-in presenter across all One News bulletins. She was on air when the Boxing Day tsunami took place, as well as during the 2005 London bombings; for this, as well as her earlier reports on the September 11 attacks, she was jokingly dubbed a 'disaster magnet' by former boss Bill Ralston.

In 2006, Petrie became co-anchor of the 6pm edition of One News alongside Simon Dallow; she replaced Judy Bailey as the primary female anchor, who had held the position for 18 years.

In mid-July 2020, it was reported that Petrie would be stepping down as co-anchor for One News in early August 2020 as a result of a job restructuring caused by the COVID-19 pandemic in New Zealand. On 14 August, it was reported that TVNZ had delayed Petrie's departure at the last minute and that she would continue to present 1 News at Six evening bulletins during Auckland's Alert level 3 lockdown. On 30 August, Petrie read her final news bulletin as the primary female anchor of 1 News at Six and signed off thanking viewers for having her for the last fourteen years.

In November 2020 she was named one of the best dressed women on David Hartnell MNZM's Best Dressed List.

== Personal life ==
Petrie is married to television producer Ross Peebles. They have three children.

== See also ==
- List of New Zealand television personalities
