= Rawdon Christie =

Rawdon Christie is a former English-New Zealand journalist turned media relations expert and real-estate sales person.

== Early life and education ==
Christie was born in London. He attended Marlborough College, and then the University of Edinburgh, where he received a Bachelor of Music degree.

== Media career ==
After a spell as a teacher of performing arts and sports coach at King's School in New Zealand, Christie attended the London College of Printing to undertake a postgraduate course in broadcast journalism. While there he won the 'Young Broadcast Journalist of the Year' award in 2000 (Broadcast Journalism Training Council). He started his journalism career with the BBC in Cambridge, firstly with BBC Radio Cambridgeshire, then with BBC Look East.

In 2003 Christie took up a position as a reporter with Television New Zealand's ONE News. In 2005 he moved to TVNZ's daily current affairs programme, Close Up. He has had stints as presenter of Midday, Tonight, Sunday, the New Zealand version of Dragons' Den and Agenda. In July 2007 Rawdon returned to ONE News and later became TVNZ's first producer / presenter when he took over ONE News at 4:30 in 2009. Christie often presented One News at 6 over the Christmas period, and from 2011 to 2012 presented the news bulletins on Breakfast two days a week.

In September 2011 Christie became co-host (with Toni Street) of Television New Zealand's new Saturday Breakfast show. In May 2012, Christie was promoted as weekday co-host of Breakfast, replacing Corin Dann; he held this job until 2016, when he was dismissed from TVNZ due to major changes being made to the breakfast programme.

Christie has since left the television industry to run his own media communications company. In 2020, he obtained his real estate licence to become a real estate salesperson for his local Barfoot & Thompson.

== Personal life ==
Christie lives in Auckland with his wife and three children.

His cousin is the movie star Julie Christie.

== See also ==
- List of New Zealand television personalities
