= Mark Sainsbury (broadcaster) =

New Zealand television presenter

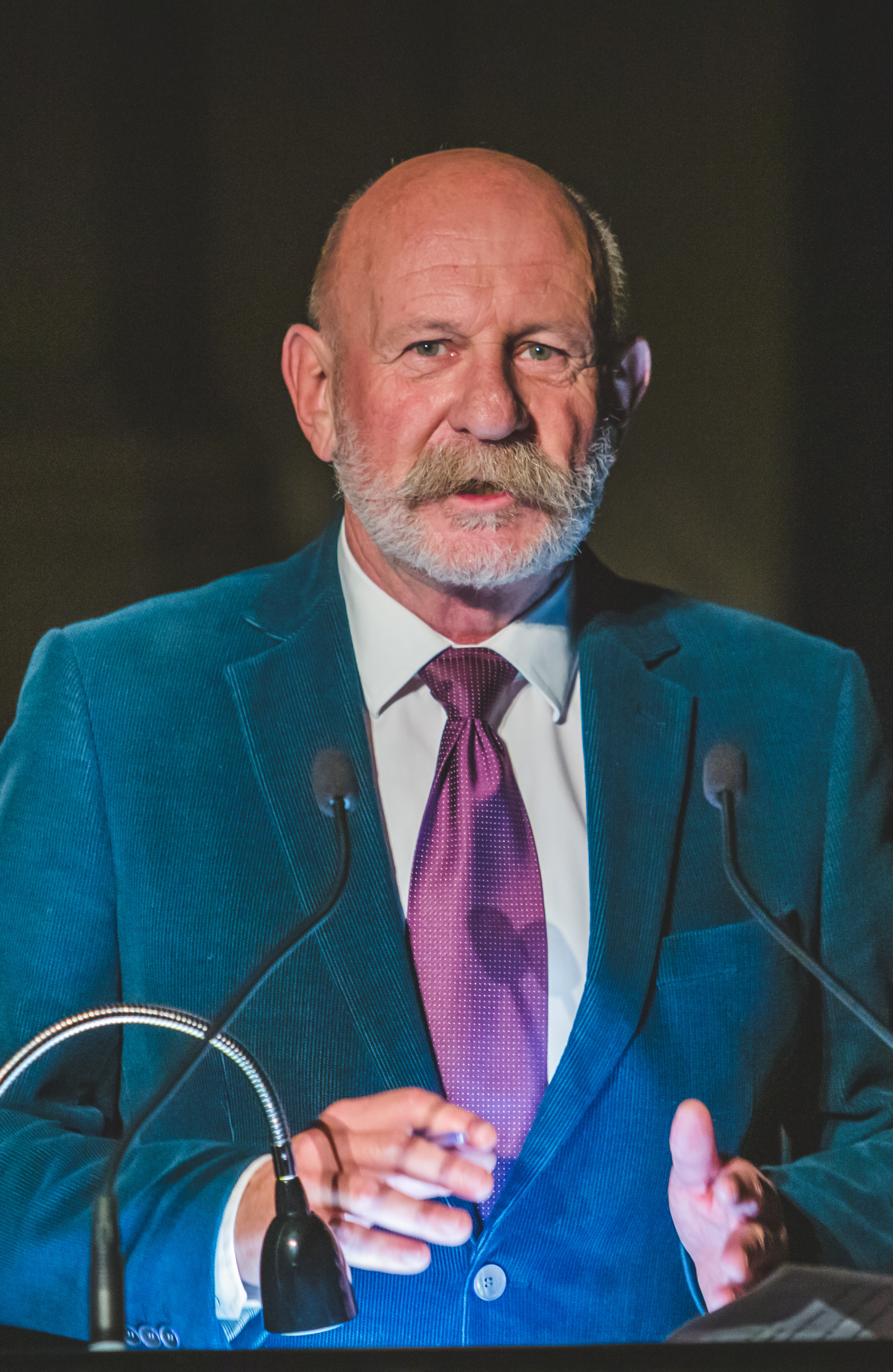
- Sainsbury in 2022
- Born: Gregory Mark Sainsbury; 1956 (age 69–70)
- Occupations: Journalist and broadcaster
- Notable credit(s): Close Up anchor (2007–12); ONE News political editor (2000–06); ONE News Europe correspondent (1993–1997)
- Spouse: Ramona Rasch

Gregory Mark Sainsbury (born 1956) is a New Zealand journalist and broadcaster. He was the political editor for ONE News from 2000 to 2005 and presented TVNZ's daily current affairs programme Close Up from 2007 to 2012. Sainsbury was also a presenter with Radio Live from 2016 to 2019.

== Early life and family ==
Sainsbury grew up in Upper Hutt, one of six sons. He began studying towards a law degree but did not finish it. After travelling overseas and working as a bus driver, he began a journalism course and before completion was hired by TVNZ as a researcher.

== Career ==
Sainsbury began a 30-year association with TVNZ in 1981 when he was hired as a researcher for the then-weekly current affairs programme, Close Up. He was posted to Dunedin in 1983 and returned to Wellington in 1984. In 1987 he spent a year working with Barry Soper at Independent Radio News, based in the Parliamentary press gallery. He returned to TVNZ in 1988 and joined the Holmes show (New Zealand's first daily current affairs programme) in 1989. A feature report Sainsbury fronted for Holmes about Sir Edmund Hillary, which was filmed in Nepal, was the basis of a long-standing friendship between the two men and Sainsbury was a family spokesperson when Hillary died in 2008.

Sainsbury worked in London as TVNZ's Europe correspondent from 1993 to 1997. He returned to work on the Holmes programme as a Wellington-based reporter until 2000, when he was appointed political editor. He held that post until January 2006, when he left to present About Now, a late-night chat show that was canceled after one year. In 2007, he succeeded Susan Wood as host of Close Up, which was at that point a daily current affairs programme and the successor to the Holmes show. Sainsbury won the 2007 Best Presenter Qantas Media Award for fronting Close Up. He left TVNZ at the end of 2012 when Close Up was cancelled; the final episode aired on 30 November.

In February 2016, Sainsbury returned to daily broadcasting as the weekday morning host on Radio Live, replacing Sean Plunket. He continued at the station until January 2019, when it ceased operating.

== Personal life ==
Sainsbury is married to Ramona Rasch, a lawyer. They have twin adult children.

The Sunday Star-Times has described his moustache as "arguably the most famous in the country". In 2024, Sainsbury courted speculation he might contest the Wellington mayoralty in the 2025 local elections.

== See also ==
- List of New Zealand television personalities
