= John Hawkesby =

New Zealand journalist (born 1947)

John Langley Hawkesby
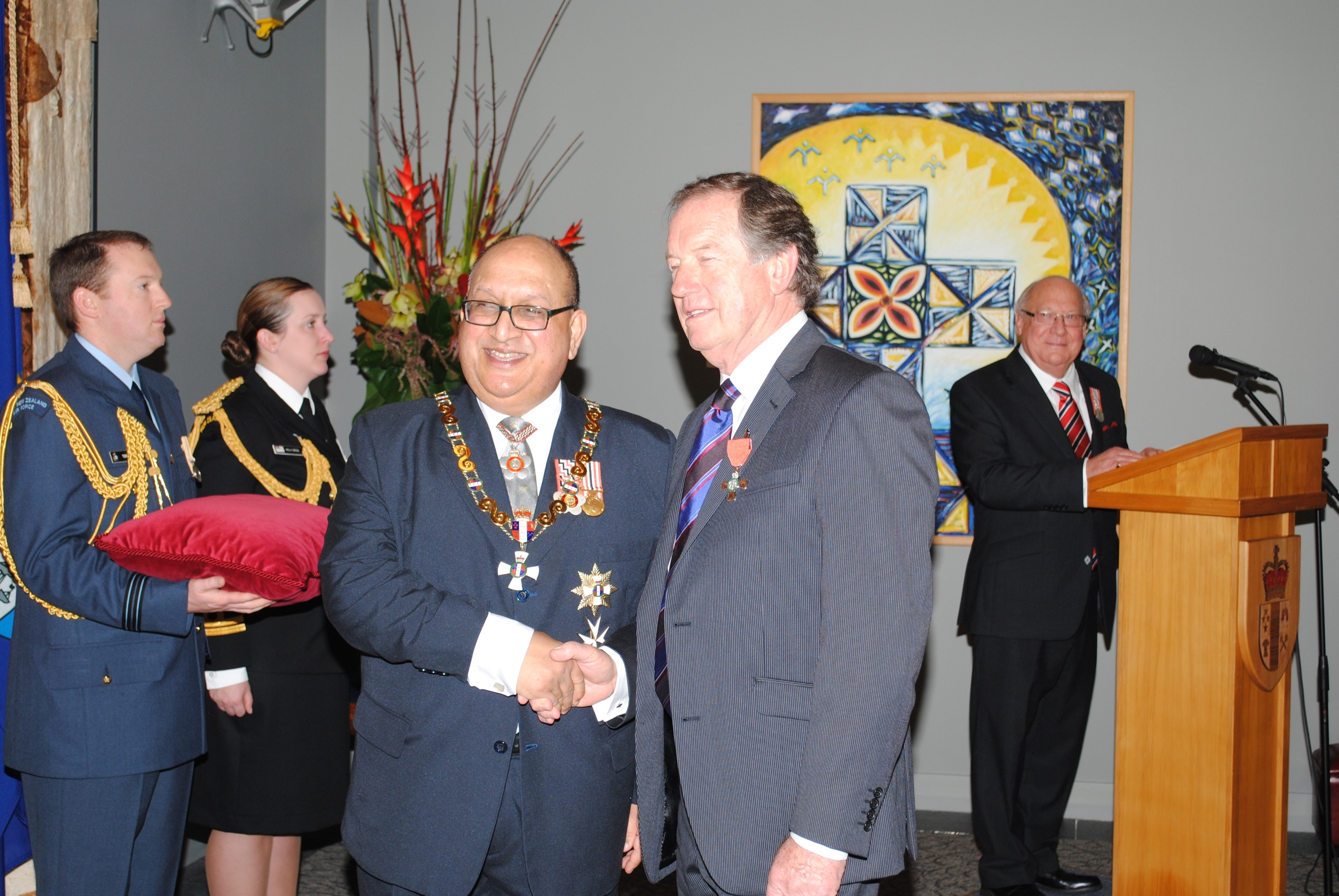
- Hawkesby (right), after his investiture as a Member of the New Zealand Order of Merit, by the then Governor-General, Sir Anand Satyanand, at Government House, Auckland, on 28 July 2011
- Born: 1947 (age 78–79)
- Occupation: Television news presenter

John Langley Hawkesby MNZM (born 1947) is a New Zealand former news presenter for One News and Three News.

== Biography ==
Hawkesby attended Auckland Grammar School in 1964. His started his broadcasting career in 1972 when he researched and presented Radio New Zealand's Christian oriented "Reflecting On" programme. This programme achieved six Mobil Radio Awards for "Excellence in Broadcasting". In 1986 Hawkesby moved to Radio Hauraki and read the breakfast news. In 1977 he joined TV2 as newsreader and in 1981 presented the top rating Top Half regional news programme for TVNZ. Hawkesby went on to host the popular It's in the Bag programme with co-host Hilary Timmins. In 1992 Hawkesby moved to TV3 as newsreader and in 1995 and 1996 was voted TV Guide's People's Choice "Best Presenter", and "Best Newsreader". On 16 February 1998, Hawkesby left TV3 after the introduction of a co-anchor. He was due to start presenting alongside Carol Hirschfeld, but after pulling out at the last moment, John Campbell filled his place.

For 3 weeks in January–February 1999, in a controversial move, Hawkesby became a weekday newsreader for One News, replacing Richard Long (who moved to presenting weekend bulletins alongside Liz Gunn). TVNZ's reason for this change was to try and capture some of the chemistry that Judy Bailey and Hawkesby had during their days presenting Top Half. The change was short-lived, Long returned to the weekday bulletins, presenting alongside Bailey and Hawkesby received a $5.2m payout. In 2005 the highest paid New Zealand newsreaders received $800,000pa.

== Post-media life ==
Since leaving the broadcasting industry, Hawkesby has been active in the New Zealand wine scene as a judge and reviewer. In the 2011 Queen's Birthday Honours, he was appointed a Member of the New Zealand Order of Merit, for services to broadcasting and the community.

== Personal life ==
John is the father of former TVNZ broadcaster Kate Hawkesby, and is the father-in-law of fellow broadcaster Mike Hosking.

In August 1997, Hawkesby published "Save The Last Dance For Me".

== See also ==
- List of New Zealand television personalities
