= Caroline Chevin =

Swiss soul singer

- Born: 28 June 1974 (age 52); Weggis, Switzerland
- Genre: Soul
- Occupation: Singer-songwriter
- Labels: Phonag, Sony Music
- Spouse: Greg Boyed (m. 2014; died 2018)

Caroline Chevin (born 28 June 1974) is a Swiss soul singer.

== Career ==
Chevin began her full-time music career in 2002; previously, she worked part-time in a bank. Her first solo album, Feel Real, was released in 2008 by record label Phonag. Back in the Days, her second album, was released by Nation Music in 2010; the eponymous single from that album remained in the Swiss Airplay Charts for eighty weeks. In March 2011, Caroline Chevin was awarded the Swiss Music Award for Best Breaking Act.

Subsequently, Chevin signed with Sony Music, which released her third solo album Hey World on 15 February 2013, The 13 songs were written by Chevin in 2012 together with songwriter Sékou Neblett (Freundeskreis, Joy Denalane) and producer Philipp Schweidler (Seven, Marc Sway).

== Personal life ==
Chevin met television presenter Greg Boyed in 2014 while she was visiting New Zealand, and they married in Switzerland later that year. Their son Kian Iraia Cassidy was born in 2015. Boyed committed suicide while on a family holiday in Switzerland on 20 August 2018.

== Discography ==
- 2008: Feel Real (Phonag)
- 2010: Back in the Days (Nation Music)
- 2013: Hey World (Sony Music)
- 2020: Enjoy the Ride (Chevin Music)
- 2022: Note to Self (Chevin Music)
