= Angela D'Audney =

New Zealand television news anchor and actress

- Born: Angela Louise Cerdan; 26 August 1944; London, England
- Died: 6 February 2002 (aged 57); Auckland, New Zealand
- Education: University of Auckland
- Occupations: Television and radio broadcaster, news anchor
- Years active: 1973–2001
- Known for: One News; Good Morning; Eye Witness News; The Venus Touch; Kaleidoscope; Angela: A Wonderful Life
- Spouse: Haddo D'Audney (m. 1965; div. 1972)

Angela Louise D'Audney (née Cerdan, 26 August 1944 – 6 February 2002) was a New Zealand television news anchor and occasional actress. She became known as New Zealand's “first lady of broadcasting” and was the first woman to regularly anchor nationwide news bulletins on New Zealand television in 1973.

In a career spanning four decades, she presented news regularly for TVNZ until 1997 and occasionally until 2001, when failing health forced her to leave her role at the broadcaster.

== Early life ==
She was born Angela Louise Cerdan in London, to a Jewish American mother, Cecile Evelyn Cerdan (née Cohen) and a Spanish father, Ramon Cerdan Pla. D'Audney spent the first years of her life in Brazil, before moving with her family to Auckland in the early 1950s. She was homeschooled and developed a love for languages, also learning her Orthodox grandmother's native Yiddish. She became a naturalised New Zealand citizen in 1956, and married Haddo D'Audney in 1965; they were later divorced.

== Career ==
D'Audney began her career in broadcasting at the New Zealand Broadcasting Corporation in 1962, working part-time as a continuity announcer, while studying microbiology at the University of Auckland. D'Audney was younger than the requisite minimum age of 21 for announcer. Bob Irvine, head announcer at the corporation was so impressed by D'Audney's audition, that he pleaded for an exception to the rules with the corporation's hierarchy in Wellington.

In 1968, she relocated to Sydney in Australia, where she was hired by the radio station 2GB, covering the midnight to dawn slot three days a week. She returned to New Zealand two years later, where she began working for the radio station Newstalk ZB as an "intermediary" between show guests, such as Bruce Slane and David Lange.

She then landed her first main role on television as a reporter for On Camera, an afternoon women's show. She sparked public debate about female newsreaders when she was rushed to the studios as a fill in to present the national news in 1973. Sharon Crosbie complained "I feel it is incongruous to have a continuity girl in a cocktail dress and hairdo saying that a typhoon has just killed 50 people." However, D'Audney was promoted from continuity to announcer to become a full-time broadcaster and then national news reader from 1973.

She also worked occasionally as an actress, and in 1982 shocked the public by appearing topless in the television comedy play The Venus Touch. She playing the partner of a sexologist with sexual problems in his own marriage, "I was an actress doing a job, and it would be unfortunate if I lost the goodwill of some viewers because of that."

She led the regional news programme, Look North. D'Audney and her colleagues were dropped from the lineup in 1984, and then hastily rehired. D'Audney turned down a position to return as a reporter. She instead took up a position as a newsreader on current affairs digest, Eye Witness News until 1989. She was replaced by Cathy Campbell and Anita McNaught, commenting "they simply didn't have my breadth of experience, my skills, my track record. I belonged in that chair next to Lindsay Perigo, not them." The show was cancelled shortly afterwards.

She continued as a current affairs presenter and occasional newsreader until 2001, gradually shifting her focus from television work to radio.

== Personal life ==
In May 2001, D'Audney was diagnosed with a brain tumour, which proved to be cancerous, and underwent an operation two weeks later. She died in February 2002 at the age of 57. During her last year, she wrote and published her autobiography, Angela: A Wonderful Life.

Her funeral was held at Beth Shalom, a Progressive Jewish congregation in Auckland. She is buried in the Jewish section of Waikumete Cemetery.

=== Legacy ===
After her death, the Angela D'Audney Trust was set up to raise funds for cancer treatment in New Zealand.
