= Judy Bailey =

New Zealand news presenter (born 1953)

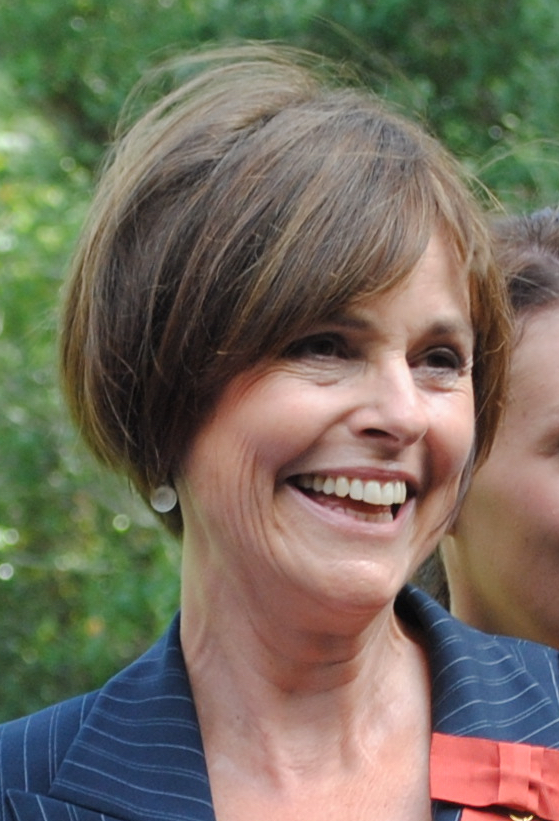
Bailey in 2010

Judy Ann Bailey ONZM (born 1953) is a former news presenter for One News, the highest rated evening television news programme in New Zealand. Bailey joined the New Zealand Broadcasting Corporation (now TVNZ) in 1971 and worked as a reporter on news and current affairs programmes. She presented the regional news with John Hawkesby for Auckland from 1980 to 1987 in the programme Top Half. From 1986 she presented the Network News at Six news bulletin (alongside Neil Billington in 1986–87 and then Richard Long until the end of 2003). A reshuffle in TVNZ following the departure of Paul Holmes in 2004 saw her become the sole news presenter for the 6pm One News bulletin, and her salary soared to NZ$800,000. The size of the salary was criticised by the government, despite it being fully funded from TVNZ's own commercial revenues and not involving taxpayer money.

On 3 October 2005, Television New Zealand announced it was not renewing her contract despite her immense popularity, as it planned a rejuvenation of its news programmes to combat slipping market share. Her final day fronting the 6pm One News bulletin was 23 December 2005. Simon Dallow and Wendy Petrie took over in January 2006. Her next role on television was on Māori Television on ANZAC Day (25 April 2006), where she co-hosted the 6am to midnight coverage of events.

In July 2009 she gave her support as a public face to the "Vote Yes" campaign for the corporal punishment referendum. She also appeared on the Intrepid Journeys television programme, travelling through Brazil, Uruguay and Argentina.

In the 2010 New Year Honours, Bailey was appointed an Officer of the New Zealand Order of Merit for services to broadcasting and the community.

== See also ==
- List of New Zealand television personalities
