= Richard Harman (journalist) =

New Zealand journalist

Richard Michael Arthur Harman ONZM is a New Zealand political journalist and broadcaster.

== Career ==
Harman studied English, Architecture, and Economics at Auckland University, but was as heavily involved in student journalism and politics as with study. Harman started his professional career as a reporter with The Dominion, where he worked as a reporter from 1972 to 1977. From here, he moved to Television New Zealand, where he was a news and current affairs reporter and political editor, working on current affairs series Eye Witness News and Assignment. Since 1999 he has founded and headed the political news production company Front Page.

Front Page, under Harman, produced the weekly TVNZ programme Agenda and the weekend TV3 show The Nation, as well as providing television production facilities for a range of New Zealand companies and government agencies.

The documentary Five Days in July, about the 1984 New Zealand constitutional crisis, which was scripted and presented by Harman for TVNZ, won the Best Documentary category at the 1995 New Zealand Film and TV Awards.

Harman has life membership and was former chairman of the New Zealand parliamentary press gallery, and in 1998 was awarded an Oxford University Fellowship by the Reuters Institute for the Study of Journalism at Green Templeton College, and has completed a Master of International Relations course at Victoria University.

In 2019, Harman was a judge for the Voyager Media Awards.

Harman's political news website Politik is regarded as a well-informed source for political analysis and is regularly quoted by established news outlets.

In the 2026 New Year Honours, Harman was appointed an Officer of the New Zealand Order of Merit, for services to journalism and broadcasting.

== Family ==
Harman is descended from an early Christchurch settler family whose patriarch was Richard James Strachan Harman.

== See also ==
- List of New Zealand television personalities
