= Beth Shalom (Auckland) =

- Location of the synagogue in Auckland

Religion
- Affiliation: Reform Judaism
- Ecclesiastical or organizational status: Synagogue
- Leadership: Rabbi Dean Shapiro
- Year consecrated: 1960
- Status: Active

Location
- Location: 180 Manukau Road, Epsom, Auckland 1023
- Country: New Zealand
- Interactive map of Beth Shalom
- Coordinates: 36°52′57″S 174°46′34″E

Architecture
- Architect: Albert Goldwater
- Type: Synagogue architecture
- Established: 6 March 1952 (as a congregation)
- Completed: 1960

Beth Shalom is a Progressive Jewish congregation and synagogue, located in Auckland, New Zealand. It is the largest progressive congregation in the country. The congregation was started in 1952 and later a temple was constructed and consecrated in 1960. It is a member of the Union for Progressive Judaism. The congregation has over 500 members, hosts a Hebrew school, and also has a burial society.

== History ==
The congregation was formed on 6 March 1952 at the home of the Pezaro family, a founding family of the synagogue. The congregation was at this point known as the Liberal Jewish Congregation of Auckland. The congregation held its first Shabbat service on 14 April and thereon regular services took place at the Auckland City branch of the Royal Commonwealth Society. A decision was made to establish a more permanent home for the congregation. A plot of land consisting an old foundry was subsequently purchased on Manukau Road in Epsom in 1953. The foundry was renovated and converted into use as small temple serving one hundred congregants. Rabbi John Levi, then a student rabbi from Australia, served as the congregation's first rabbi.

As the congregation outgrew the old foundry, the congregation commissioned a new temple building by local architect, Albert Goldwater. Building work was completed in 1960 and the temple was consecrated in the same year. A second building project was undertaken in 1989 to expand the synagogue. The old foundry building that had been serving as a Hebrew School and social hall was demolished and rebuilt with a new, improved design. The original sanctuary of the 1960 temple was converted into a social hall, with a new sanctuary, offices and classrooms built.

In recent years, Beth Shalom has been in discussions to relocate to the large former campus of Saint Kentigern Girls' School in Remuera. Auckland Hebrew Congregation (AHC), with the assistance of the Woolf Fisher Trust, purchased the site in 2019. Schools and Jewish organisations are also relocating to the site, creating a new Jewish centre in Auckland.

== Notable members ==
- Jo Aleh, sailor and Olympic gold medalist
- Angela D'Audney, veteran broadcaster

== See also ==
- List of synagogues in Australia and New Zealand
- History of the Jews in New Zealand
