= Daniel Corbett =

British broadcast meteorologist

Daniel Corbett is an English broadcast meteorologist, who worked for the Met Office and the BBC for many years until May 2011. He joined the Met Office and BBC Weather Centre in 1997, after beginning his career in the United States. In May 2011, Corbett made his final BBC weather report prior to taking up a new post in New Zealand with the MetService. He currently works for TVNZ.

== Early life ==
Corbett was born in Dagenham and grew up in Billericay.

== The BBC (1997–2011) ==
In 1997 Corbett was invited to join the Met Office and the BBC to help launch the new BBC News 24. He was a key member of the weather team and presented the first ever weather forecast on the channel. He also appeared on a range of other BBC output, including forecasts for BBC Breakfast News in 1998, appearances on BBC One and BBC Two and broadcasts across the BBC's network of radio stations. In 2000 Corbett returned to the US, where he freelanced as a meteorologist for a number of TV stations across the southern states, including KRIV in Houston, Texas. In 2001 he moved to Tucson, Arizona, where he worked at KGUN-TV as a weather forecaster and feature reporter. Corbett spent three months back at the BBC Weather Centre in summer 2003 presenting forecasts on BBC World, before returning to the US. He returned to the UK, BBC and Met Office in 2004. Since 2005, Corbett has presented forecasts for the BBC's coverage of the Wimbledon Tennis Championships live from the courtside for two weeks each summer. In July 2007 Corbett appeared regularly on BBC News covering severe flooding in southern Britain. He also presented several forecasts BBC One live from the floodwaters in Gloucestershire. His experience of working in the US means Corbett was often called upon to comment on severe weather events like hurricanes and tornadoes on various BBC News programmes and the BBC News channel. On 17 May 2011 he announced on BBC Radio 5 Live that he was leaving the BBC to work in New Zealand for the Met Service. He made his final 5 Live forecast on 18 May 2011.

== Met Service and 1 News (2011–present) ==
After three years in New Zealand, he made his final Met Service forecast on 9 May 2014. In September 2014, it was announced that he would be joining the 1 News weather team at TVNZ. He made his first weather presentation on TVNZ, where he currently works, in September 2014.
