= Jennie Goodwin =

New Zealand journalist

Jennifer Goodwin (born c. 1945) is a New Zealand journalist, television newsreader and continuity announcer. In 1975 she became a news presenter on the newly launched TV-2, making her New Zealand's first female television newsreader, and the first woman within the Commonwealth of Nations to present a prime time news programme. In 2025 she was presented with a Scroll of Honour from the Variety Artists Club of New Zealand for her notable contributions as a respected journalist, television newsreader and presenter.

== Career ==
Goodwin was asked to undertake a voice audition for an Auckland television station, AKTV-2, after competing in a beauty contest. Goodwin then worked in radio before moving into television in the 1960s, where she initially worked as a continuity announcer.

On Monday 30 June 1975 she became a news presenter on the newly launched TV-2, making her New Zealand's first female television newsreader, and the first woman within the Commonwealth of Nations to present a prime time news programme. She was twice voted by the public the NZ Female Television Personality of the year, in 1976 and 1980. She later read news on television and radio for Singapore Broadcasting for two years.

In 2009 she was one of several former TVNZ presenters to return to the station to celebrate 40 years of television network news in New Zealand.

In 2025 she was presented with a Scroll of Honour from the Variety Artists Club of New Zealand for her notable contributions as a respected journalist, television newsreader and presenter.

== See also ==
- List of New Zealand television personalities
