= Close Up (TV programme) =

2004 New Zealand TV programme

- Title card, 2010
- Presented by: Mark Sainsbury (2007–2012); Mike Hosking (back-up presenter); Susan Wood (2004–2006)
- Country of origin: New Zealand

Production
- Camera setup: Multi-camera
- Running time: 30 minutes (with commercials)

Original release
- Network: TV One
- Release: 2 November 2004 – 30 November 2012

Related
- Holmes; Seven Sharp

Close Up was a half-hour-long New Zealand current affairs programme produced by TVNZ. The programme aired at 7 pm weeknights (straight after One News) on TV One and was presented in its final years by Mark Sainsbury. The last edition was broadcast on 30 November 2012. Seven Sharp, a current affairs show aimed at a younger audience, took its place in 2013.

The new Close Up began broadcasting on 2 November 2004 as a replacement for the Holmes show immediately after Paul Holmes announced his resignation from TVNZ and that he would be presenting a similar show on Prime TV in 2005. The show was originally branded as Close Up at 7 using the existing Holmes studio; when the show relaunched in 2005, it was branded as simply Close Up with a new-look studio.

Close Up was hosted by Susan Wood from its first show on 2 November 2004 until 4 December 2006, when she resigned from TVNZ, citing health problems.

Close Up competed with the TV3 current affairs show Campbell Live, and shared the same time slot with TV2 drama Shortland Street.

== Personnel ==
=== Presenters ===
Presenter	Role	Tenure
Susan Wood	Main presenter	2004–2006
Mark Sainsbury	Main presenter	2007–2012
Paul Henry	Backup presenter	2004–2008
Mike Hosking	Backup presenter	2008–2012
Greg Boyed	Backup presenter	2011–2012

=== Reporters ===
- Gill Higgins
- Robyn Janes
- Daniel Faitaua
- Hannah Ockelford
- Matt Chisholm
- Michael Holland
- Corinne Ambler
- Dominic Bowden (entertainment reporter)

=== Producers ===
- Louisa Cleave
- Katherine McCallum
- Christopher Lynch
- Mike Valintine (executive producer)

== Major New Zealand awards ==
Robyn Janes, Louisa Cleave (producer) and Corinne Ambler won Best Current Affairs Reporting for a daily programme and the coveted Journalist of the Year awards at the 2009 Qantas Film & TV Awards. Robyn, Louisa and Corinne won for their series on the shocking state of two New Zealand schools - Wairoa's Tiaho Primary School and Whanganui Awa School. It was the second year in a row that Robyn has been recognised. She won the award for Best Current Affairs Reporting for a daily programme in 2008 as well.

== Previous version ==
In the 1980s, Close Up was a weekly, hour-long current affairs' programme, looking more in depth into domestic news topics of the day, much in the mould of 60 Minutes.

== Close Up cancellation ==
On 28 September 2012, TVNZ decided to cancel Close Up at the end of the year taking a new stance at the 7pm time slot. TVNZ head of news and current affairs Ross Dagan said "a new daily current affairs show with a distinctively different format." This also ended Mark Sainsbury's association with the state owned channel.

The show ended on 30 November 2012.

== Controversy ==
=== Broadcasting standards breaches ===
In October 2009, the Broadcasting Standards Authority (BSA) upheld complaints against Close Up for breaching standards of good taste and decency, liquor promotion, and children’s interests in a May 2009 item featuring a group of duck hunters in the Wairarapa. The broadcast showed hunters mixing alcohol and firearms, visibly promoting beer brands, and engaging in crude antics—including one man diving nude onto a blow-up doll—all during a 7pm timeslot without warnings. The BSA found that the item glamorised unsafe and inappropriate behaviour, failed to consider the presence of child viewers, and presented liquor consumption in a way that was not socially responsible. TVNZ was ordered to broadcast a summary of the decision, pay $1,500 in costs to Lion Nathan Ltd, and $3,500 to the Crown.

In March 2011, the Broadcasting Standards Authority (BSA) upheld a complaint against Close Up for breaching standards of good taste, decency, and children’s interests in an August 2010 broadcast featuring pornographic actress Nina Hartley. The segment included sexually explicit clips from Hartley’s adult films—such as simulated sex acts and visible nudity—aired during family viewing time with only a brief viewer warning. While TVNZ had acknowledged the breach and apologised, the BSA found its response insufficient given the seriousness of the content, which it said exceeded acceptable limits for 7pm current affairs programming. The Authority ordered TVNZ to broadcast a summary of the decision and pay $3,000 in costs to the Crown.

In May 2014, the BSA upheld a complaint by a New Zealand doctor who was the subject of a 2012 Close Up broadcast investigating his unapproved stem cell treatments for multiple sclerosis. The programme included covert footage filmed during a patient consultation, which the Authority found breached the doctor’s privacy and treated him unfairly. The doctor was not given a reasonable opportunity to respond before the broadcast, and the raw footage was destroyed, undermining TVNZ’s ability to justify the use of a hidden camera on public interest grounds. The BSA ordered TVNZ to pay $5,500 in legal costs to the complainant.
