= Richard Long (broadcaster) =

New Zealand broadcaster

Richard Long (born c. 1945) is a former New Zealand broadcaster, initially with the New Zealand Broadcasting Corporation (NZBC), subsequently with Television New Zealand (TVNZ). He co-hosted the 6 pm Network News bulletins on TV One from 1988 until 19 December 2003, with co-anchor Judy Bailey. He was dropped from weekday news for six weeks in 1999, presenting weekend bulletins alongside Liz Gunn while Judy Bailey and John Hawkesby fronted the weekday bulletins, before TVNZ responded to public pressure and returned him the weekday spot alongside Bailey on 1 March 1999.

During his career at TVNZ he covered the Aramoana massacre in 1990, reporting live from the township, and with Bailey presented the memorial service for yachtsman Peter Blake in 2001. Long and Bailey were presenters of the year at the 2001 Qantas broadcasting awards.

TVNZ announced it would not renew Long's contract on 22 October 2003, with head of news and current affairs Bill Ralston enacting cost-cutting measures and stating a desire to have a single newsreader format. He had an emotional departure on his last day, including an on-air send-off and an honour guard of TVNZ staff.

In 2007, Long provided voice-overs in Hanover Finance advertisements; the Commerce Commission investigated the commercials in 2008 for misleading statements. Long later expressed regret about voicing the advertisements, saying that he personally lost $50,000 investing in Hanover.

== See also ==
- List of New Zealand television personalities
