= Colin James (journalist) =

New Zealand political journalist and commentator

Colin James CNZM
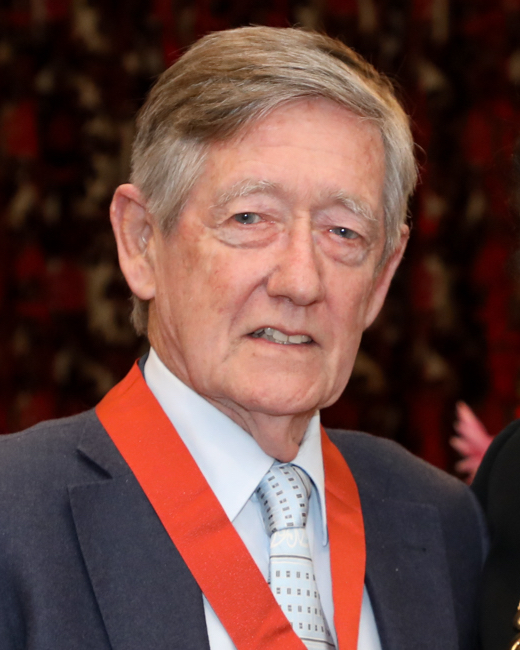
- James in 2023
- Born: 25 November 1944 (age 81); Balclutha, New Zealand
- Occupation: Journalist
- Notable credit: Political columnist of the year in 2003
- Website: http://www.colinjames.co.nz

Colin Charles James CNZM (born 25 November 1944) is a New Zealand political journalist and commentator. He is a life member of the New Zealand Parliament's press gallery and has a focus on party and election politics.

== Biography ==
James was born on 25 November 1944 in Balclutha. His parents were Stanley James and Caroline Annie (née Shicock). James has one daughter.

James wrote a weekly column in the Otago Daily Times, a monthly column in Management Magazine and previously wrote a weekly column in The New Zealand Herald. He was formerly editor of the National Business Review and has also written for the Far Eastern Economic Review.

He is the New Zealand correspondent of Oxford Analytica and has written a number of books and presented numerous papers at conferences both in New Zealand and overseas, including through his role with the Institute for Governance and Policy Studies at the University of Victoria. He sometimes speaks on television and radio.

He is an associate (and was previously managing director) of The Hugo Group, a forecasting panel with a membership of around 90 medium to large-sized organisations. The Hugo Group also works with organisations to help them understand their strategic environment.

James believes that as a political commentator he should not vote and has not done so since 1975, and his political views are not publicly known.

In the 2023 King's Birthday and Coronation Honours, James was appointed a Companion of the New Zealand Order of Merit, for services to journalism and public policy.

== Bibliography ==
- Building the Constitution (2000 – editor)
- The Quiet Revolution published by Allen & Unwin New Zealand Limited in association with Port Nicholson Press, Wellington (1986).
- New Territory (1992)
- Covering Elections – A Guide for Journalists
