= Simon Dallow =

New Zealand journalist, former news anchor and barrister

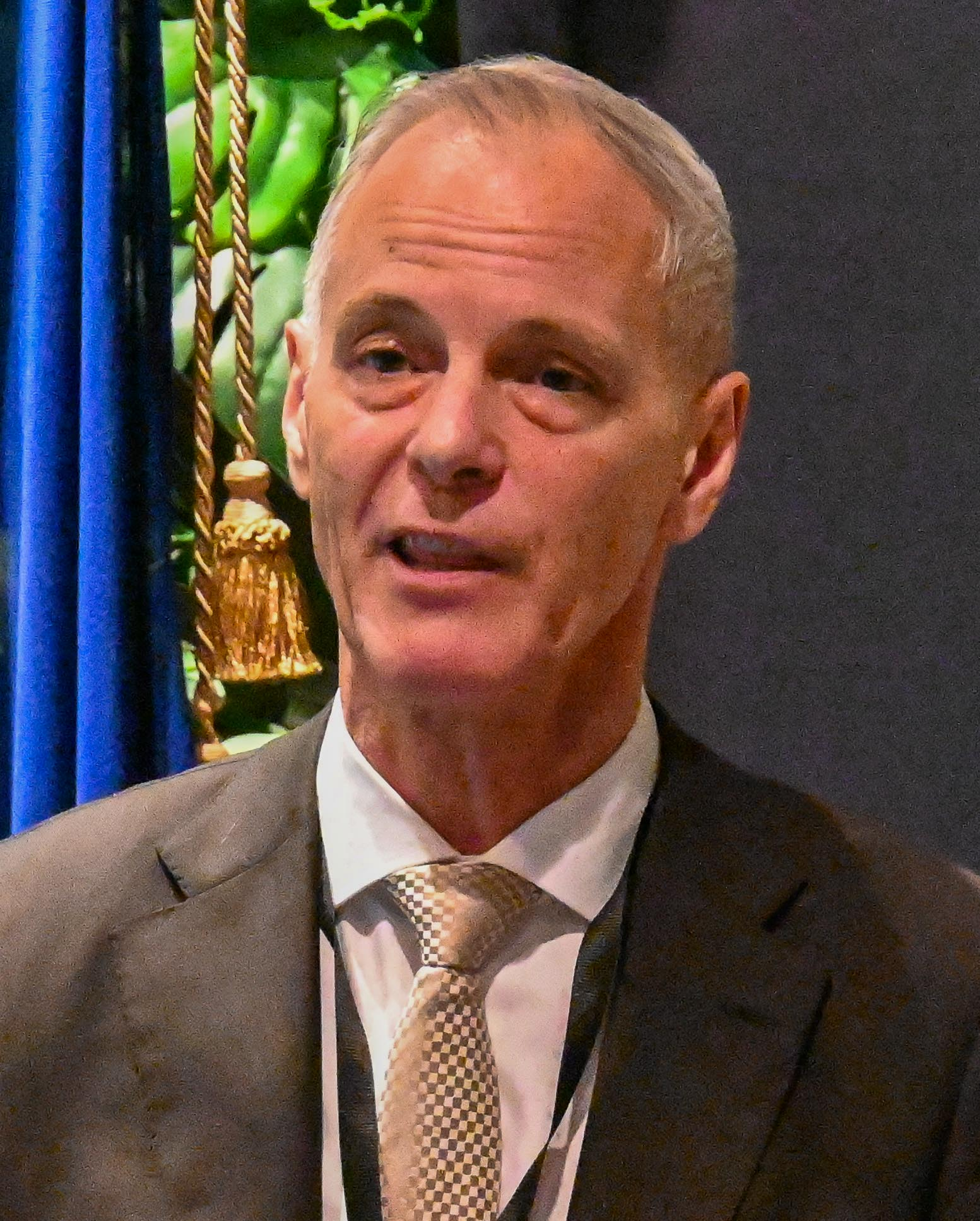
- Dallow in 2025
- Born: Simon Ross Dallow; 18 June 1964 (age 62)
- Education: University of Auckland
- Occupations: Broadcast journalist, barrister
- Relatives: Ross Dallow (father); Graeme Dallow (uncle); Matthew Dallow (brother)

Simon Ross Dallow (born 18 June 1964) is a New Zealand journalist, television personality and former barrister.

== Early years ==
Simon Dallow, who is the son of Ross Dallow, was educated at Liston College and St Peter's College in Auckland. He completed his tertiary education at Auckland University, where he studied law. After completing his legal studies, Dallow practised as a litigation and insurance lawyer in Auckland.

He discovered he had whakapapa Māori links aged 20.

Whilst on his overseas experience, the 1987 stock market crash occurred, causing him to change careers, as a future in bankruptcy law was unappealing. Dallow spent the next six years as a Contiki Tours tour director in Europe, where he met future wife Alison Mau. Both returned to New Zealand in 1993, and began working for TVNZ.

Dallow married Mau in 1996, the couple had two children. They separated in 2009.

== Career ==
Dallow was employed by TVNZ since 1993, initially as a presenter for TV2's Newsnight, alongside his then-partner Alison Mau and Marcus Lush. From 1995, he and Mau presented the mid-evening edition of One Network News; the couple moved to present the weekend bulletins in 1998 and Dallow remained in this role until the end of 2003. The New Zealand Herald described him as having "fallen out of favour" with TVNZ head of news and current affairs Bill Ralston, who had started with the network that July. In 2004 and 2005, Dallow presented TVNZ's Saturday morning news and interview programme, Agenda.

From 2003 to 2006, Dallow was co-presenter of four seasons of Test the Nation alongside Lana Coc-Kroft (2003, 2005) Stacey Daniels (2004) and Wendy Petrie (2006). In 2004, he narrated a documentary on the foreshore and seabed controversy. He was also a radio broadcaster, presenting the mid-morning slot on Viva FM, later known as Mix, from 2005 to 2007.

From January 2006, Dallow and Petrie succeeded Judy Bailey as the presenters of 1News at Six. From 2020, Dallow was retained as the sole presenter. In 2023 a fake video of Dallow, generated with artificial intelligence, was used to advertise gambling websites. His last day as presenter was on 28 November 2025.

== See also ==
- List of New Zealand television personalities
