= Melissa Stokes =

New Zealand newsreader and reporter

- Born: Melissa Tania Stokes; 1978 or 1979 (age 47–48)
- Television: 1News; Breakfast

Melissa Tania Stokes (born 1978 or 1979) is a New Zealand television presenter and reporter. She has presented 1News on weekdays and Sunday since 28 November 2025. She previously presented 1News on weekends from 2019 to 2025.

== Early life and education ==
Stokes grew up in Tauranga. Her first job was working at the deli section of a New World supermarket. Her parents ran fabric shops and she worked for them as a teenager. At age 16, she and her family moved to Christchurch, where she finished high school. She did one year of law at the University of Canterbury with the intention of becoming a lawyer, but later described it as "really dull" and realised that she probably would not perform in front of a judge and jury, like she wanted to. She later attended broadcasting school, also in Christchurch. Her uncle, Spencer Jolly, was a TVNZ journalist during Robert Muldoon's term as prime minister, and later worked for Channel 9 in Brisbane, Australia. Because of this, as a teenager Stokes visited the channel's studio. She has said her uncle partly inspired her to work in television. At broadcasting school she got an internship at the Prime TV newsroom in Christchurch, which she found slightly disappointing because her friends were getting internships at TVNZ and Newstalk ZB, but she later described it as a "great opportunity" because of the mentorship of her boss Steve Bloxham.

== Career ==
Stokes began working for TVNZ in 2001, as a reporter for the morning news programme Breakfast. Between 2006 and 2008, she was the TVNZ Europe correspondent. In December 2018 it was announced that Stokes would replace Peter Williams to become the 1News at 6pm newsreader during the weekends. On the same day of the death of Queen Elizabeth II, Stokes travelled to the United Kingdom as a presenter for TVNZ's rolling coverage of the event. In early November 2025 TVNZ announced that Stokes would replace Simon Dallow as the main weekday presenter for 1News. She assumed the role on 28 November, after Dallow stood down.

== Personal life ==
Stokes is married to Dave Pierce, a cameraman, and they have two children. Her mother chose to die by euthanasia after having cancer for about seven years.
