= Bill Ralston =

New Zealand journalist, columnist, radio host, television host (born 1953)

- Born: 1953 (age 72–73); Auckland, New Zealand
- Education: BA (University of Auckland)
- Occupations: Journalist, columnist, radio host, television host
- Spouse: Janet Wilson

Bill Ralston (born 1953) is a New Zealand journalist, broadcaster, and media personality, active in television, radio and print. He has worked as a political correspondent, fronted the television arts show Backch@t, and was the head of news and current affairs at TVNZ from 2003 to 2007. The New Zealand Herald has described him as controversial.

== Personal life ==
Born in Auckland, he attended Northcote Primary School and later Northcote College where he was Head Prefect.

At the University of Auckland he studied politics and history, and wrote for the student magazine Craccum.

He married Janet Wilson, who also works in the media, in c.1997, and has two children from a previous marriage. He takes a photo of Mark Kellogg, an Associated Press reporter who died with General Custer at the Battle of the Little Bighorn, wherever he goes.

== Career ==
=== Early ===
Ralston's career began with a cadet job for South Pacific Television in 1979. In 1980, he worked as a general news reporter for Television New Zealand (TVNZ) in Wellington and Christchurch. TVNZ seconded him to the BBC for six months in 1981, where he worked as a reporter for Wales Today in Cardiff. Returning in 1982, he went to the New Zealand Parliament Press Gallery as a political correspondent for TV ONE, where he covered the fall of the Muldoon government.

During the mid-1980s, he was a foreign correspondent for TVNZ, reporting from Indonesia, South Africa, China, the Philippines and Europe. He was shot at a Soweto school during the 1986 rebel Cavaliers tour of South Africa, and told by the Ministry of Information he was not welcome back. From 1987, he was a reporter for TVNZ's Frontline, before moving to competitor TV3 as Political Editor in 1989. In 1990 he was expelled from Fiji for his reporting. He later fronted TV3's Nightline current affairs show.

=== 1990s ===
From April 1997 until October 2000 he was the editor of Metro lifestyle magazine. In 1999, an official from the Ministry of Health visited Ralston and threatened to prosecute the magazine under the Smoke-free Environments Act 1990, over a cigar review column. Ralston complained, saying the magazine derived no income from the column. While editor, several top Auckland restaurants banned him due to reviews in the magazine.

He hosted the arts and media show Backch@t for the show's three-year run from 1998 to 2000. Backch@t won the New Zealand Film and Television Awards Best Lifestyle Programme for all three years, and the 1999 Qantas Media Award Best Television Media Programme.

=== 2000s ===
In July 2000, police were called to a Saatchi & Saatchi fundraising event, where it was alleged Ralston had punched guests. Until July 2003 he was writing for the Sunday News and the Independent business weekly, and was a talkback show host on Radio Pacific.

CEO Ian Fraser appointed Ralston head of news and current affairs at TVNZ starting on 14 July 2003, Fraser saying, "Bill's energy, his experience and just a hint of the mongrel" would meet the challenge of the job. Ralston had a goal of reducing the $46 million TVNZ news budget by $4.5 million, and there were a number of high-profile departures from the broadcaster, including Judy Bailey, Richard Long, and Paul Holmes. Discussing the departures later in 2007, he blamed the government, including Prime Minister Helen Clark, for political interference in the salary negotiations. He drew criticism in March 2005 for verbally attacking Prime Television CEO Chris Taylor, saying, "I'd be shooting myself. I'd be pouring petrol over myself and throwing myself off Auckland's tallest building". In 2006, ONE News won the Qantas Media Award Best News Programme. He faced disciplinary action also in 2006 over an expletive-laden call to a Herald on Sunday journalist, who was making enquires about a homeless cousin. Ralston resigned from TVNZ on 30 January 2007, prior to an announcement of restructuring.

Since TVNZ he has written columns for The New Zealand Herald, Herald on Sunday, The Listener, the Media Scrum blog for Fairfax Media, and in 2009 was an afternoon host for Radio Live. Former foreign minister Winston Peters refused to appear on the Sky News New Zealand show covering the 2008 general election, because he objected to Ralston, the host.

=== 2010s ===
At the 2016 Auckland local elections, Ralston contested the Waitematā and Gulf ward of the Auckland Council. He came second in the contest to incumbent councillor Mike Lee and was not elected.

=== 2020s ===
As a former editor employed by the Bauer Media Group, he commented on the company's decision to wind down its New Zealand business in response to the government banning magazines as part of the coronavirus lockdown as follows: "Eighty years of the Listener gone because some clod in Government decided to ban the publication."

== Recognition ==
- 1998 and 1999 Qantas Awards for Excellence in Journalism as Best Political Columnist
- 1999 Qantas Media Award, Best Overall Columnist.

== See also ==
- List of New Zealand television personalities
