= David Beatson =

New Zealand journalist, broadcaster and political advisor (1944–2017)

- Born: David Colin Beatson; 14 April 1944; Dunedin, New Zealand
- Died: 21 September 2017 (aged 73); Auckland, New Zealand
- Occupations: Journalist; media analyst; broadcaster
- Spouse: Lesley Miller
- Children: 2 (biological), 3 (stepchildren)

David Colin Beatson (14 April 1944 – 21 September 2017) was a New Zealand journalist, broadcaster, political communications strategist and media analyst. He worked extensively in television, print and radio, and held a number of public roles including chief press secretary to Prime Minister Jim Bolger and chair of NZ On Air.

== Early life and journalism career ==
Beatson was born in Dunedin and began his journalism career in 1962 as a cadet reporter for the Otago Daily Times. He later worked at the Waikato Times and for the New Zealand Broadcasting Corporation (NZBC) in Dunedin.

In the late 1960s and 1970s, Beatson became a familiar face on New Zealand television. He hosted the regional current affairs programme Town and Around and worked as a reporter and producer on national programmes including Gallery and Nationwide. In 1975, he became TV2's first parliamentary correspondent and co-hosted that year's leaders' debate. He also created the nightly parliamentary news programme Eyewitness in 1978.

== Print media and broadcasting leadership ==
In 1984, Beatson was appointed editor of the New Zealand Listener, a role he held until 1988. As editor, he was known for defending editorial independence and championing public-interest journalism.

Beatson later founded the talkback station Radio Pacific and remained influential in media discourse throughout the 1990s and 2000s.

== Political and corporate roles ==
In early 1989, Beatson joined the communications team of National Party leader Jim Bolger. He was widely credited with helping to revamp Bolger's public image in the lead-up to the 1990 general election. After Bolger became prime minister, Beatson served as his chief press secretary until 1991.

Beatson went on to become deputy chief executive of the New Zealand Tourism Board in 1992, and in 1994 joined Air New Zealand as manager of public affairs, later rising to vice-president for government and international relations. He left the airline in 2002.

Beatson also chaired the government's Millennium 2000 Taskforce, which oversaw New Zealand's celebrations marking the year 2000.

== NZ On Air and media policy ==
From 1996 to 2002, Beatson served as chair of NZ On Air, the government's broadcasting funding agency. He advocated for inclusive programming and helped set Māori content targets for mainstream broadcasters. He also contributed to New Zealand media policy through his involvement in legislative consultations and broadcasting standards development.

== Later life and Māori involvement ==
Beatson maintained close ties with the Kīngitanga (Māori King Movement) through his marriage to Lesley Miller and her son, Gregory Miller, who became an executive in the Waikato Tainui tribal authority. In 2009, Beatson helped draft Kīng Tūheitia's 10-year strategic charter.

Beatson died in Auckland on 21 September 2017 following a long illness.
