= Mike Hosking =

New Zealand broadcaster

- Born: 1965 (age 60–61); Dunedin
- Occupations: Broadcaster, television producer
- Employer: Newstalk ZB
- Spouses: Marie Angela Hosking (m. 1989; div. 2002); Kate Hawkesby (m. 2012)
- Children: 2

Michael Noel James Hosking IV is a New Zealand television and radio broadcaster who has worked for Radio New Zealand and TVNZ and from 2008 has been the weekday breakfast host on Newstalk ZB with "The Mike Hosking Breakfast". He is a supporter of the centre-right National party. He has lived and worked as a broadcaster in Dunedin, Wellington, Christchurch and currently resides in Auckland.

The Broadcasting Standards Authority (BSA) has received several complaints against Hosking. In 2016 Andrew Judd, the Mayor of New Plymouth, was unsuccessful with his complaint that Hosking's comments related to a local issue were racist, but in 2017, a complaint by the Māori Party alleging he made misleading comments about who was eligible to enrol in Māori electorates was successful. During the COVID-19 pandemic in 2020, the BSA also upheld a complaint that Hosking's comments about death rates for Coronavirus breached the Radio Code of Broadcasting Practice.

== Career ==
After leaving school at 16, Hosking wrote to Radio Avon and Radio Windy looking for work, and gained a job as a copywriter at Radio Windy. Hosking then began working at Radio New Zealand National in the 1990s where he later co-hosted Morning Report alongside Geoff Robinson.

Hosking first entered television in 1997 as an original co-host of TVNZ's Breakfast alongside Susan Wood, later working with Alison Mau, Liz Gunn and Kate Hawkesby before leaving the show at the end of 2004.

Following the departure of Paul Holmes in late 2008, Hosking took over the Newstalk ZB breakfast show which became known as The Mike Hosking Breakfast. As of 2026, the show remains the most listened to breakfast show in New Zealand a spot it has held since 2021.

Returning to TV later in 2008, Hosking hosted the game show Who Wants to Be a Millionaire? New Zealand. In 2014, alongside Toni Street, Hosking joined TVNZ's Seven Sharp for the shows second season. The duo left the show in late 2017.

In November 2020 he was named one of the best dressed men in show business on David Hartnell MNZM's Best Dressed List.

== Personal life ==
Hosking grew up in Christchurch, living in the suburbs of St Albans, Mairehau and Linwood, and attending St Albans Primary School, Mairehau Primary School and Linwood High School.

In 1989, Hosking married Marie Angela Hosking, and, in June 2001, she gave birth to twins Ruby and Bella. They parted in August 2002. In 2003, they were involved in a court case against Pacific Magazines, that involved photos taken by tabloid journalist Simon Runting in December 2002 of Marie and her two daughters. The case in question Hosking v Runting led to the creation of the tort of privacy in New Zealand common law.

In 2012, Hosking married fellow broadcaster Kate Hawkesby. She has three children from her previous marriage.

== Politics and business interests ==
In an interview with North & South in 1990, Hosking described himself as "a money person, I’m a capitalist. I’m to the right of Roger Douglas."

In 2012, Hosking was revealed to have received $48,000 in payments and perks from SkyCity Auckland Casino for doing regular work for them, while still working as presenter for TVNZ. During controversy over proposed taxpayer subsidies for Sky City building a national convention centre, Hosking wrote in defence of the subsidy, describing the convention centre as an "aspirational investment".

In 2013, he was the master of ceremonies at Prime Minister John Key's state of the nation speech, which he also endorsed. Hosking rejects the scientific consensus on climate change, stating on Seven Sharp that he doesn't believe in the IPCC report.

In 2015, Hosking was accused of overt political bias by NZ First leader Winston Peters and Labour leader Andrew Little, a claim strongly denied by Hosking and Prime Minister John Key.

During the 2017 election campaign, Hosking was appointed moderator of one of the televised leader debates, and was again accused of political bias by much of the New Zealand public. This led to a petition for his replacement being widely circulated, and collecting over 75,000 signatures. Debate host and organisers TVNZ responded that it would not placate the petition signers, and affirmed that it will keep him on as moderator.

Hosking is opposed to Māori wards.

== Controversy ==
In 2016 the Broadcasting Standards Authority (BSA) received complaints about comments by Hosking critical of New Plymouth Mayor Andrew Judd who resigned from office following abuse Judd received for proposing a Māori ward on the local district council. Complaints referred to racism implicit in Hosking's remarks. The BSA did not uphold the complaints, noting that the Seven Sharp presenters regularly give their opinion on issues, and the outspoken and opinionated presenting style of Mr Hosking is well known to viewers. The BSA believed that overall Mr Judd was not unfairly treated and his comments balanced Hosking's view.

On 23 August 2017, a month before New Zealand's general Parliamentary election, Hosking asserted that only those enrolled in a Māori electorate were able to vote for the Māori Party. He said “…you can’t vote for the Māori Party because you’re not enrolled in the Māori electorate”. Members of the Māori Party and the general public criticised his statement as being misleading. The Māori Party lodged formal complaints with broadcaster TVNZ and the Electoral Commission over Hosking's comments.

Hosking made further comment the following night saying, “The fact that anyone can vote for [the Māori Party] as a list party I automatically assumed we all knew given we have been doing this for 20 years… and it went without saying. So hopefully that clears all of that up.”

The Māori Party complaint was referred to the Broadcasting Standards Authority (BSA) which upheld the complaint. The BSA ruled Hosking breached its accuracy standard when he said to his co-presenter, "…you can't vote for the Māori Party because you're not enrolled in the Māori electorate". The comment was made on 23 August, just under a month out from the 2017 general election. The BSA found Hosking's comment could have misled voters. The BSA found that the potential harm caused by this broadcast, in leaving viewers misinformed about their ability to vote for the Māori Party, outweighed the broadcaster's right to freedom of expression. The BSA consider that Mr Hosking's statement during broadcast on 23 August 2017 was inaccurate and misleading, and that the clarification subsequently provided was confusing and insufficient to correct the inaccuracy. This was an important issue, particularly during the election period, and had the potential to significantly affect voters’ understanding of the Māori roll and of New Zealand's electoral system.

=== Coronavirus pandemic ===
On 6 April 2020, Hosking made comments about COVID-19 death rates, stating that deaths were much the same as during the flu season two years ago and claimed that "almost everybody in Italy said to have died of Covid-19 had in fact died 'with the virus' – but not 'of it'." A complaint about his comments was made to the Broadcasting Standards Authority. It was upheld and the ruling, recorded on 14 September 2020, summarised that "Mr Hosking’s comments about people with underlying health conditions and Italy’s death-rate statistics breached the accuracy and discrimination and denigration standards of the Radio Code of Broadcasting Practice". The BSA noted that "Mr Hosking did not consider or acknowledge the possibility that [these people] may have died a lot sooner than they might otherwise have, due to contracting Covid-19,” [and that] "the broadcast had the potential to mislead listeners about the facts behind Mr Hosking’s relatively strong views critiquing the Government’s measures to manage the impact of Covid-19.”

=== Teachers' strike comments ===
In November 2023, the Broadcasting Standards Authority (BSA) upheld a complaint against The Mike Hosking Breakfast concerning comments made during the 12 June 2023 broadcast. In response to a listener’s question, Hosking stated that striking teachers receive full pay and are "supported by the unions." The BSA found the statement was materially inaccurate and misleading, as teachers are not typically paid while on strike, and unions do not pay members their full salary. Although later text messages from listeners offered some clarification, the BSA determined that these did not amount to a proper correction, nor did the broadcaster make reasonable efforts to ensure accuracy.

The BSA concluded that upholding the complaint was a reasonable limit on free expression, given Hosking’s influential position, and emphasised the importance of factual accuracy in opinion-based programming. No formal order was made, with the publication of the decision deemed sufficient.

== See also ==
- List of New Zealand television personalities
