= Susan Wood (television presenter) =

New Zealand television presenter

- Born: Takapuna, Auckland, New Zealand
- Occupation: TV One Journalist
- Children: Two Sons

Susan Wood is a New Zealand television presenter who hosted TV One's nightly news and current affairs show Close Up.

== Biography ==
The daughter of Alex Wood the chief reporter of the now-defunct Auckland Star.

Wood began her career in journalism in 1979 as a print reporter for the Bay of Plenty Times before moving on to The New Zealand Herald in Auckland to work as the court and then police reporter.

She began her career with TVNZ in 1985 as a reporter for the then-network news (simply called News) and the regional news show Top Tux. She was the first Australia correspondent for ONE Network News.

Wood also hosted the lifestyle series' Open Home and New Zealand Living, was Paul Holmes' regular fill-in on Holmes (on occasion, the credits were altered to show Holmes with Susan Wood as the title), presented Frontline and Assignment and was the original presenter of Midday and Breakfast. She co-presented Breakfast with Mike Hosking for two-and-a-half years until she left the early-morning show to host Today Live, which ran for two years.

In 2001, Wood was awarded a Bravo award by the New Zealand Skeptics for her Fiordland moose interview from 27 June.

On 2 November 2004 Paul Holmes resigned from TVNZ and announced he was moving to a rival TV company, Prime Television. The Holmes show ended immediately and was replaced by a new current affairs show, Close Up, which was the same as Holmes in format, with Susan Wood as the new host.

In 2005 Wood took her employer TVNZ to court after the broadcaster attempted to cut more than $100,000 from her salary. Wood won the case, and in 2006 returned as Close Up's presenter.

On 4 December 2006 Wood announced her resignation from TVNZ for health reasons. TVNZ said that for the previous few weeks, Wood's health had been a matter for serious concern. She had surgery in mid-December 2006 to remove a lump from her neck following an inconclusive biopsy.

Wood took a job as general manager of the Takapuna Beach Business Association in October 2007, but left a week later saying that it did not have the funding to achieve what she wanted for Takapuna.

She hosted the TVNZ current affairs programme Q&A between 2013 and 2015. She works as a backup talkshow host on talkback radio station Newstalk ZB.

On 10 January 2015 Wood was carrying washing up the stairs of her Auckland home when she fell and suffered a brain injury.

== See also ==
- List of New Zealand television personalities

== Sources ==
- About Susan Wood at TVNZ
- Close Up minisite
