= Paul Holmes (broadcaster) =

New Zealand broadcaster (1950–2013)

Sir Paul Holmes KNZM
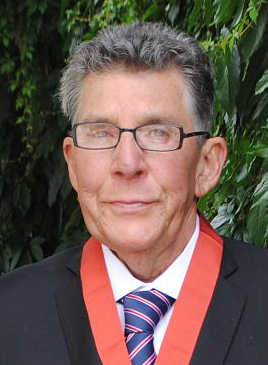
- Holmes in January 2013
- Born: Paul Scott Holmes; 29 April 1950; Hawke's Bay, New Zealand
- Died: 1 February 2013 (aged 62); Hawke's Bay, New Zealand
- Education: Victoria University of Wellington
- Occupations: Radio and television broadcaster
- Years active: 1972–2012
- Known for: Broadcasting
- Spouses: Hinemoa Elder (m. 1992; div. 1998); Deborah Hamilton (after 2003)
- Children: 3

Sir Paul Scott Holmes KNZM (29 April 1950 – 1 February 2013) was a New Zealand broadcaster who gained national recognition through his high-profile radio and television journalism. Holmes fronted one of first major prime time current affairs shows of the 1980s, Holmes, which ran on TV One from 1989 to 2004. Holmes hosted the Newstalk ZB breakfast show from 1985 to 2008, and the Saturday morning show from 2009 to 2012.

Holmes' other ventures included several notable hosting slots, including a short-lived weekly show on Prime Television in 2005, two stints as the anchor of This Is Your Life and from 2009 until his retirement in 2012 the Sunday morning political talk show Q+A.

Due to his high-profile appearances and controversial manner, Holmes' personal life was often documented alongside his charitable efforts. He spent much of his career in the spotlight, including his campaigning of the Paralympics, the birth of his son, the collapse of his marriage, his daughter's drug problems and his death. Holmes was also credited with bringing AIDS awareness to New Zealand, after featuring a story on a young girl with the disease, Eve van Grafhorst, on Holmes. However, he was criticised for his offensive views on people of colour, specifically of Māori and Black people.

Owing to his success, Holmes picked up a celebrity-like status and often made appearances in other media such as long running soap opera Shortland Street.

Holmes underwent treatment for cancer in 1999 and heart surgery in 2012. He retired shortly after the latter treatment and in 2013 was knighted by the Governor-General of New Zealand. Just two weeks later, Holmes died at his Hawkes Bay home.

== Early life ==
Born in 1950 as the first son of Chrissie and Henry Holmes, a mechanic, Holmes grew up in Hawke's Bay and attended Haumoana Primary School and later Karamu High School in Hastings whilst the family lived in Tuki Tuki Road on a small agricultural property. He and his younger brother Ken were involved in rowing and debating, and Paul became a prefect. The family had another son, Christopher, who died shortly after birth.

Holmes had a particular interest in radio, and by sixth form he was practising announcing into the family tape recorder, auditioning at the local radio station, and acting on stage. At high school, Holmes became close friends with Mike Williams (future President of the New Zealand Labour Party) and Peter Beaven (future CEO of Pipfruit NZ). The trio remained friends for the rest of Holmes' life.

In 1968, Holmes left his family home and began studying law at Victoria University of Wellington. He shared a room at the university accommodation Weir House with Williams. Shortly into his course, he swapped his degree to the arts and was awarded a BA. Holmes was inspired by the actor Dustin Hoffman and wished to emulate his success. He got his first professional acting job on a radio production of Antony and Cleopatra and acted alongside Sam Neill in the drama society club. Whilst studying, Holmes worked at a Hawke's Bay freezing-works.

== Career ==
Holmes began his career on radio in Christchurch in the 1970s. He then worked in Australia, the United Kingdom and the Netherlands before returning to New Zealand to take up a morning slot on Wellington station 2ZB. In 1974 he starred as Reg Willis in the TV series Buck House.

In March 1987, Holmes took over from 1ZB host Merv Smith, who had been breakfast host for many years. This coincided with a change in format from community radio (middle of the road music, news, community notices, etc.) to Newstalk. The change was controversial, as many long-standing Smith listeners did not like Holmes or the news, interview and talkback format with no music. 1ZB fell to seventh position in the ratings and it took over a year before Holmes' show eventually rose to number one in the ratings for the programme's time slot.

In 1989, Holmes became part of the younger, new-look revamp of Television New Zealand's prime-time news. His 7pm network programme (simply titled Holmes, initially starting at 6:30 and later moving to 7:00 when the news was extended to one hour), analysing news items in greater depth, ran until 2004. Holmes' first TV segment featured guest Dennis Conner, the America's Cup skipper. After being provoked, Conner walked off the set, providing Holmes with headlines the next day.

Holmes published an autobiography in 1999. A year later he released an album on CD, simply titled Paul Holmes.

In the 2003 Queen's Birthday Honours, Holmes was appointed a Companion of the New Zealand Order of Merit, for services to broadcasting and the community.

After 15 years anchoring Holmes, he was reportedly disgusted to have been offered a six-month contract instead of an annual alternative and subsequently on 2 November 2004 he resigned from the show. Shortly after this he moved to rival TV company Prime Television, which had offered him a three-year contract.

His new show, Paul Holmes, launched on Prime on 7 February 2005. The new show was up against two new competitors, John Campbell's Campbell Live on TV3 and Susan Wood's Close Up on TV One, in a three-way competition that had previously never been seen on New Zealand television. In February 2005, the show rated 7.1 percent for its timeslot, compared with his former programme on TV One (renamed Close Up) at 31 percent share. In March 2005, following the launch of a rival show on TV3, Campbell Live, Nielsen Media Ratings listed Holmes' show at 4 percent. Poor ratings forced a timeslot change to 6 pm after only four months. By this time, the show had been retitled Holmes.

However, these small changes were not enough to save the show, the timeslot change proving fatal. On 8 August 2005, almost six months to the day after the show launched, it was axed by Prime Television, with Prime chief executive Chris Taylor citing poor ratings and inability to attract viewers from the traditional primetime news strongholds of TV One and TV3. The show returned in a weekly format in late 2005 and in 2006 was revamped into an hour-long chat show similar to the popular UK show hosted by Michael Parkinson.

In 2005, Holmes was dropped from the New Zealand Listener's 50 most powerful people list largely because of his TV show's poor ratings and influence.

He appeared on Māori Television's Waitangi Day coverage on 6 February 2007. In March, TV One, Holmes's former network, announced that he would be among the celebrities on the third season of the New Zealand version of Dancing with the Stars.

In early 2011, Holmes published Daughters of Erebus, a book on the 1979 Erebus Air New Zealand DC-10 airliner crash.

Sir Paul has a cameo in the form of a portrait with him wearing knights armour in the breakfast room on The Traitors NZ.

== Retirement and death ==
In January 2012 Holmes received treatment in hospital after a "health scare". He had previously battled prostate cancer in 1999, but had been released shortly after. The scare was reportedly the return of the cancer. In June he underwent open heart surgery and was placed into an induced coma to heal. In November 2012 a television blog posted a story claiming Holmes only had weeks to live due to congestive heart failure. Holmes rejected the rumor. Holmes broadcast his final interview in November 2012, with Kim Dotcom as the subject. Several weeks later, Holmes resigned from his radio work and on 8 December, announced his retirement. Following their interview, Holmes and Dotcom became friends and in Holmes' final days, he was visited by him. Holmes had left his breakfast show on ZB at the end of 2008, to be succeeded by Mike Hosking, instead doing daily phone-ins to Hoskings show. These also ended when he retired.

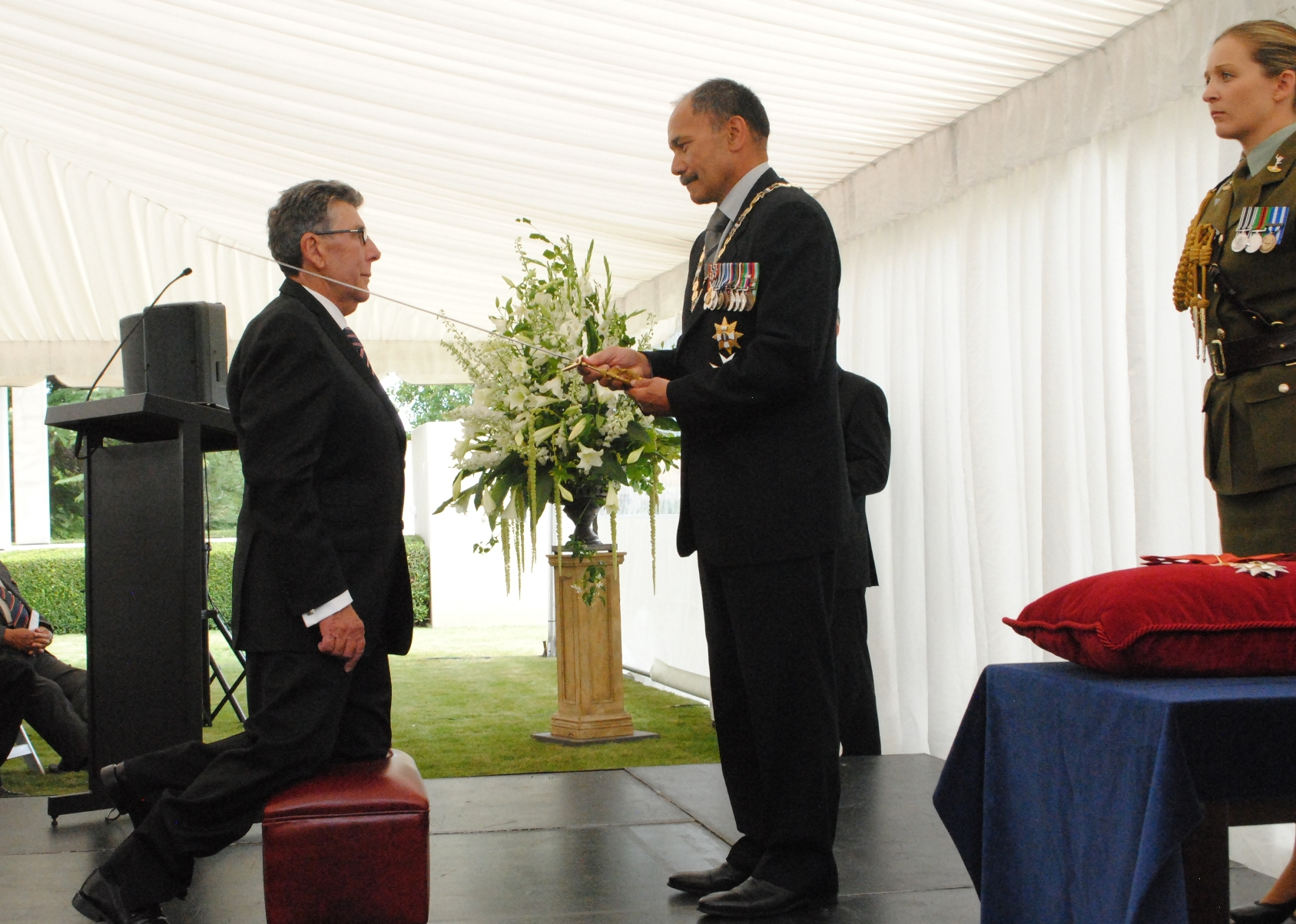
Holmes being knighted by the governor-general, Sir Jerry Mateparae, on 16 January 2013

In the 2013 New Year Honours, Holmes was appointed as a Knight Companion of the New Zealand Order of Merit for services to broadcasting and the community. His investiture was conducted on 16 January 2013 at his residence, earlier than originally scheduled due to his failing health. Just a week later, Holmes was admitted to hospital. He was held under observation for two nights and was then released back into the care of his family. Many of those who had previously clashed with Holmes released statements making peace with the broadcaster, but a notable refusal to comment came from Dennis Conner (the American skipper who walked out of the first Holmes episode).

Holmes died on 1 February 2013 at his family home in Hawkes Bay. His public funeral was held on 8 February.

== Personal life ==
Holmes' personal life was highly documented in the media in part due to his celebrity status measuring up to those he interviewed. He had brushed death numerous times in his life. The first occurred in 1973 when he suffered a major car accident in which he fractured his neck and developed a brain hemorrhage which cut vision to one of his eyes. He also survived several aircraft crashes, including a helicopter crash into the sea at Anaura Bay in June 1989, which killed fellow passenger cameraman Jo Von Dinklage. In 2004, he had two crash landings piloting his vintage Boeing Stearman biplane, on 14 January southeast of Tūrangi, and on 31 December at Bridge Pa Aerodrome near Hastings. Holmes also survived numerous health scares, including overcoming prostate cancer in 1999, and the heart condition hypertrophic cardiomyopathy.

In 1991, Holmes became a father when his partner, Hinemoa Elder, gave birth to a son, Reuben Holmes. Elder had a daughter from a past relationship, Millie, whom Holmes was very attached to and who openly described herself as a "daddy's girl". Holmes later stated one of the proudest moments in his lifetime was when Millie referred to him as "dad". Holmes married Elder the following year but the marriage only lasted 5 years. Towards the end of the marriage, Holmes began a short-lived affair with co-worker Fleur Revell that eventually saw him leave his wife and children. In 1998, Holmes started seeing real estate agent Deborah Hamilton. In 1999, the two moved in with each other, and in 2003, married.

In 2007, Holmes' stepdaughter, Millie Elder-Holmes, was arrested on charges of possession of methamphetamine. Holmes stood by Millie and ended up campaigning against the drug. Holmes' public addressing of the issue and opposition to Millie's boyfriend led to the two falling out for over a year. In January 2010, they reconciled. Charges were eventually dropped. In 2014, Millie's boyfriend, Connor Morris, was killed in a fight in Massey, West Auckland.

== Controversies ==
Holmes gained media attention for a number of controversial remarks about prominent individuals and issues, including a comment made in 2003 about wahi tapu (Māori sacred places).

- In 2001, the Broadcasting Standards Authority ruled against Holmes for lack of balance and journalistic integrity in a series of news stories covering a campaign dubbed 'A Generation Lost?' The campaign, led by Auckland-based marketer Richard Poole, blamed the then Helen Clark-led Government for a brain-drain of 'young New Zealanders', a key political issue at the time. The campaign was later exposed as politically motivated and financially backed by the New Zealand Business Roundtable, which Holmes was reputed to have known about but did not disclose.
- In September 2003, he repeatedly referred to then-United Nations Secretary-General Kofi Annan as a "cheeky darkie" during his radio show. There was an international outcry following the comments, but Holmes kept his job after making several emotional apologies, claiming he had been "tired". The major sponsor of his TV show, Mitsubishi Motors, withdrew its support.
- In March 2004, he called the then-Israeli Prime Minister the "butcher Sharon." Later that year he described Tariana Turia as a "confused bag of lard", "a bully" who "folded under pressure" and who did not have the "guts to vote", as being "all mouth and no trousers, all talk and no walk" and a "complete fool".
- In November 2010, TVNZ announced it would investigate official complaints regarding Holmes' performance on the current affairs show Q&A during an interview with various players in the Hobbit film project controversy.
- In February 2012, Holmes wrote an opinion piece for The New Zealand Herald strongly criticising Waitangi Day and Māori people. He labelled Waitangi Day as "loony Maori fringe self-denial day" and described a "hopeless failure of Maori to educate their children and stop them bashing their babies." The piece resulted in a number of formal complaints, which were upheld by the New Zealand Press Council.

== See also ==
- List of New Zealand television personalities
