= Jenny Suo =

New Zealand television reporter

- Born: 1990 (age 35–36); China
- Education: New Zealand Broadcasting School
- Occupation: Television reporter
- Known for: 1 News Tonight; Breakfast

Jenny Suo (born 1990) (Note: Suo was reported to be aged 28 on 4 March 2019, indicating a birth date between 5 March 1990 and 4 March 1991, and aged 35 on 26 September 2025, indicating a birth date between 27 September 1989 and 26 September 1990. Taken together, she was born in 1990.) is a New Zealand television newsreader. She is currently sports presenter for 1News at 6pm, having previously hosted Newshub Late, 1News Tonight, and co-hosted Breakfast.

== Early life and education ==
Suo was born in China. She moved to New Zealand aged four, in 1994, and could not speak English when she started school. Suo's mother could not use her degree from China in New Zealand, so she studied accounting at Auckland University of Technology while also working part-time in a supermarket. Suo's father spent some time working in China to support the two. Suo attended Pakūranga College in Auckland.

In 2004 Suo, aged 14, and her classmate investigated the blackcurrant drink Ribena for a science fair. The two were testing to see if fruit drinks with lower prices were less healthy. They found that the drink had no vitamin C despite the label saying so. After believing that they had run the test incorrectly, teachers supported the results, expressing belief that they were correct. This encouraged them to send the results to GlaxoSmithKline (GSK), who made the drink at the time, but they received no response. Fair Go began to cover the story, and they soon wrote to the Commerce Commission. In 2007, GSK pleaded guilty to 15 charges of breaching the Fair Trading Act. Consequently, Suo had several interviews and calls from overseas journalists, which she described as overwhelming for a teenage girl. Ribena continued selling following this incident, albeit with a poorer reputation.

Suo attended the New Zealand Broadcasting School in Christchurch and attained a Bachelor's Degree in Broadcast Journalism.

== Career ==
After completion, she was given a job at Three, where she stayed for eight years, and hosted Newshub Late.

She started hosting 1News Tonight in January 2019, replacing Greg Boyed after his death. 1News Tonight was cancelled in 2024, with its final episode airing on Friday, 10 May 2024.

In May 2020, Suo started co-hosting Breakfast alongside John Campbell, Matty McLean and Jenny-May Clarkson. She left the show in November 2021.

== Personal life ==
Suo announced the birth of a daughter in 2025, following difficulties with IVF.
