= Pakūranga College =

Location
- 180 Pigeon Mountain Road; Half Moon Bay; Auckland 2012; New Zealand; 36.8978°S 174.9028°E

Information
- Type: State co-ed Secondary School Year 9–13
- Motto: Latin: Caelum Certe Patet (Reach for the skies)
- Established: 1961
- Ministry of Education Institution no.: 80
- Principal: Billy Merchant
- Enrolment: 2,270 (July 2026)
- Socio-economic decile: 7O
- Website: pakuranga.school.nz.

Pakūranga College is a co-educational state secondary school in east Auckland, New Zealand. Serving years 9 to 13, it has a school roll of 2,270 as of July 2026.

The current principal, Billy Merchant, was appointed in 2024.

== History ==
The school was built on part of an old dairy farm that was known for its swampy soil in winter. The school initially opened on 7 October 1961 by Ronald Algie. The founding principal was Kenneth Rae with an initial roll of 312 students and 17 staff members.

In 2025, the school updated its branding to incorporate a macron over the 'u' (Pakūranga), aligning with correct te reo Māori orthography. The school was listed by the Ministry of Education as Pakūranga College thereafter.

=== Principals ===
In total, the school has seen 8 principals: Kenneth Rae was the head of the college till 1967, taken over by Ernest Rive. From 1978, Stan Seager was the principal. The school then saw leadership from Pamela Stone from 1987 to 2003. Bali Haque was principal from 2003 to 2006. Prior to being principal, Haque was formerly president of the Secondary Principal's Association and also was principal at Rosehill College. He then went on to be the Deputy Chief Executive of NZQA. After Haque, Heather McRae, who was Associate principal under Haque, became principal of 2006 to 2009. McRae left to be principal of Diocesan School for Girls and was replaced by Michael Williams from Aorere College. In June 2024, Michael Williams left to become a Leadership Advisor at the Ministry of Education. The current principal is Billy Merchant.

=== Ribena ===
As part of a school science project in 2004 at Pakūranga College, two 14-year-old school girls (Anna Devathasan and Jenny Suo) discovered that Ribena, a blackcurrant fruit juice drink sold in 100 ml ready-to-drink containers contained very little Vitamin C, contrary to advertising for the product. Approaches by the two teens to the company did not resolve the issue but the matter was publicised on national consumer affairs television show Fair Go and came to the attention of the Commerce Commission. The commission's testing found that Ribena contained no detectable vitamin C. On 27 March 2007, GlaxoSmithKline pleaded guilty in an Auckland District Court to 15 charges relating to misleading conduct, and was fined $217,000.

=== Uniform controversy ===
In late 2024, Pakūranga College announced plans to bar Year 13 pupils from wearing mufti in 2025, citing safety concerns. This change faced opposition, particularly due to the short notice and financial concerns relating to the cost of a new uniform. After a Change.org petition reaching over 1,000 signatures, the ban was postponed until 2026.

== Enrolment ==
Pakūranga College's enrolment zone covers much of East Auckland. The school is marked by the red circle.

As of July 2026, Pakūranga College has a roll of 2,270 students, of which 208 (9.2%) identify as Māori.

As of 2026, the school has an Equity Index of 431, placing it amongst schools whose students have below average socioeconomic barriers to achievement (roughly equivalent to deciles 6 and 7 under the former socio-economic decile system).

Pakūranga College's enrolment home zone covers the East Auckland suburbs of Farm Cove, Highland Park, and Sunnyhills, along with parts of Half Moon Bay, Pakuranga Heights, Bucklands Beach, and Howick.

== School buildings ==
Pakūranga College has traditionally named its blocks of classrooms after past principals and staff. This is evident in all the principals from Mr Rae to Mr Williams having classroom blocks or other buildings named after them:

- Rae Block – a general purpose block, with a strong focus on the social sciences.
- Rive Block – a general purpose block, containing science classrooms and the languages department.
- Seager Block – the mathematics block, containing all the mathematics offices.
- Pamela Stone Block – the English block.
- Jill Sweeny Block – the science block, containing most of the schools' science classrooms (Chemistry, Biology and Physics). The block is named after the former science teacher and head of department, Jill Sweeny, who contributed a lot to the science department.
- Haque Block – the most recently built block, containing English classrooms, and computer labs.
- McRae Library – the library.
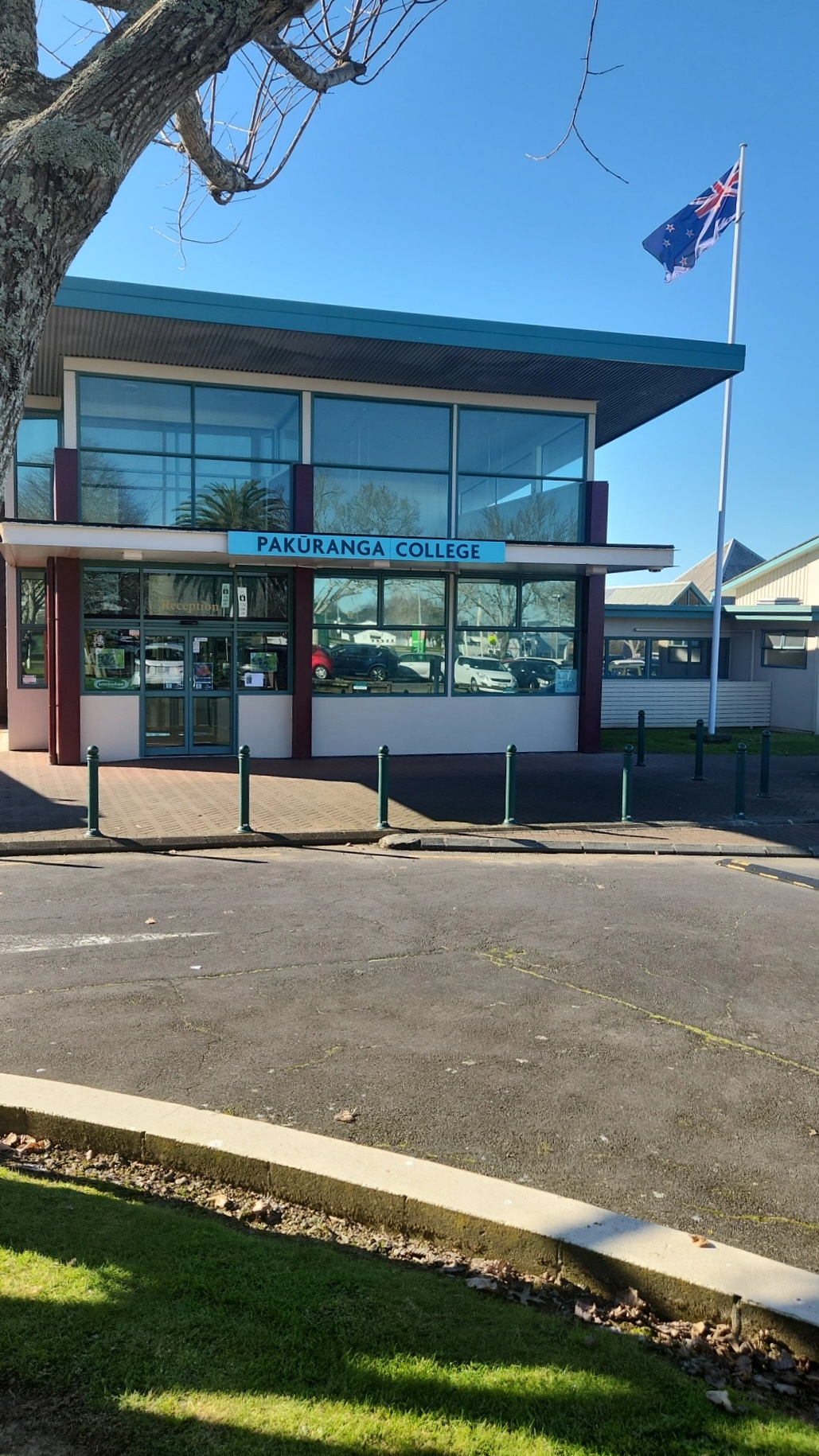
- The front of the reception at Pakūranga College
  Williams Sports Centre – a gym containing various indoor sports courts, along with a few classrooms.
- Dowdle Gym – an older building named in 2022 along with the Haque Block, McRae library, and Williams Sport Centre. Named after long serving former deputy principal Brian Dowdle.

There are a number of other buildings throughout the school, given generic names.

== House system ==
The students of Pakūranga College are randomly divided into six different houses (called Whānau) named after New Zealand native trees. Each Whānau is represented by a colour and mascot. Although the students are not physically separated into these houses, it acts a system of administration.

Whānau each contain 14 Whānau groups and are headed by a Whānau Leader and Assistant Whānau Leader (deans of the house). Each Whānau group is made up of around 30 students from years 9 to 13, and is headed by a Whānau group teacher.

The only time students are in house groups on a daily basis is through Whānau groups. Students are in their Whānau groups for a brief period from Monday to Thursday every week. This is for pastoral support of students such as attendance and the daily notices of co-curricular activities.

Students also participate in school events in their Whānau. Such events include the school swimming sports, athletics day and other inter-house competitions including Whānau Arts Challenge.

Whānau name	Whānau mascot/nickname	Whānau colour
Totara	Tōtara Tigers	Yellow
Kauri	Kauri Kings	Red
Nikau	Nīkau Knights	Blue
Rimu	Rimu Rhinos	Green
Pohutukawa	Pōhutukawa Pirates	Orange
Matai	Mataī Moose	Purple

== Notable alumni ==
- Jami-Lee Ross, Member of Parliament for Botany, leader of Advance New Zealand
- Michael Wood, Member of Parliament for Mt Roskill, 28th Minister of Transport
- Lawrence Xu-Nan, Member of Parliament via the Green Party list
- Jenny Suo, Television News Reporter for 1News
- Ata Hingano, professional rugby league player for the York Knights in the Super League
- Chanel Harris-Tavita, professional rugby league player for the New Zealand Warriors in the National Rugby League
- Josiah Karapani, professional rugby league player for the Brisbane Broncos in the National Rugby League
- Tevita Latu, professional rugby union player for Canterbury in the National Provincial Championship
