= Fair Go (disambiguation) =

Fair Go is a former New Zealand consumer affairs television programme.

Fair Go or Fair go may also refer to:

- "Fair go", a set of beliefs endemic to Australian culture
- Fair Go, a campaign launched by Australian entrepreneur Dick Smith in 2017
- Fair Go for Australia, a political party founded by South Australian politician Sarah Game in 2025, abbreviated as Fair Go
