= Hilary Barry =

New Zealand journalist and TV personality

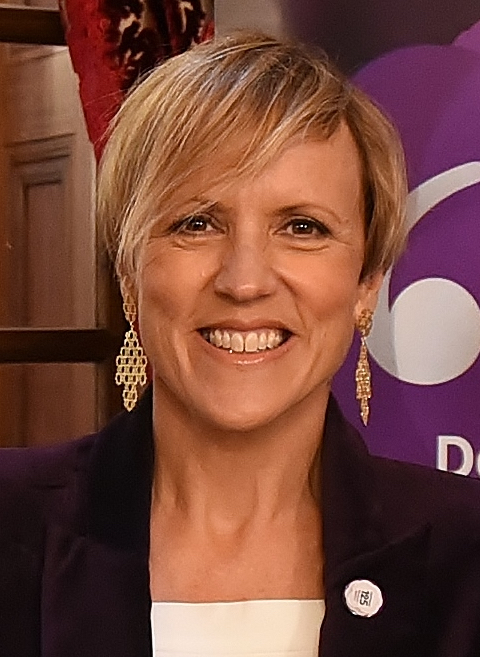
- Barry in 2018
- Born: Hilary Ann Pankhurst; 4 December 1969 (age 56)
- Education: Victoria University of Wellington (BA)
- Occupation: Broadcast journalist
- Employer: Television New Zealand
- Spouse: Mike Barry
- Relatives: Liam Barry (brother-in-law); Kevin Barry (father-in-law); Emmeline Pankhurst (great-great-great aunt)

Hilary Ann Barry (née Pankhurst; born 4 December 1969) is a New Zealand journalist and television personality who co-hosts Seven Sharp with Jeremy Wells on TVNZ 1. She was a newsreader on TV3 for many years and until 2016, presented the 6 pm Newshub show with Mike McRoberts. She also worked on the Paul Henry morning TV show since its launch, reading the news. Barry resigned from these roles in April 2016.

== Personal life ==
Barry attended Queen Margaret College in Wellington from 1980 to 1987, and was head girl in her final year. She later completed a Bachelor of Arts in Linguistics at Victoria University of Wellington and a Certificate of Journalism.

She and husband Mike Barry, a teacher and son of All Black Kevin Barry, have two sons.

== Career ==
=== Radio ===
Barry began her career as a reporter for radio 89.3 TODAY FM (now More FM Wairarapa), before moving to RNZ in the Masterton office Barry describes her time at RNZ: "I was in sole charge of a thriving newsroom that was inundated with stories of serial killers, sexual deviants and the local shearing competition, called the Golden Shears."

She read the morning news on radio station More FM and participated in the morning shows from 1993–2003. On 9 February 2009, Barry became news anchor on the RadioLIVE breakfast show hosted by Marcus Lush, and was on RadioLive until 2016. In 2020–21, Barry co-hosted the 3 pm slot on 'The Hits', covering for a period of maternity leave.

=== Television ===
Barry became a TV3 news reporter in Christchurch in 1993 then moved to Auckland to work as a reporter on 3 News. She presented 3 News on weekends for six years, before becoming the weeknight 3 News co-anchor alongside Mike McRoberts in 2005. Barry's move into co-hosting 3 News was precipitated by the former regular anchors John Campbell and Carol Hirschfeld moved on to respectively present and produce the 7 pm current affairs show, Campbell Live. In 2015, Barry joined the Paul Henry show as the news anchor, alongside her role as co-anchor of 3 News (then rebranded as Newshub). On 4 February 2016, Barry laughed uncontrollably during The Paul Henry Show when reading a news item about a former Malaysian diplomat who admitted going to a young woman's home with no pants on and defecating on her step before leaving. The reporter in that story had used the phrase "emergency defecation situation" when reporting the former diplomat's excuse in court and it was this phrase that caused Barry to laugh uncontrollably. The incident received widespread coverage and a video uploaded by Henry received about 270,000 views on YouTube in two days.

Hilary Barry unexpectedly resigned from MediaWorks (thus Newshub and Paul Henry) on 26 April 2016. Barry had been with the company for 23 years, working across several brands. Barry quit TV3 amid rumours that she was heading to TVNZ. When MediaWorks chief executive Mark Weldon resigned five days later, Barry and co-host Mike McRoberts were seen bringing champagne and beer into the Mediaworks office to celebrate. When entering the building, Barry gave a "v for victory" sign with one of her hands, but declined to comment further. It was later revealed that McRoberts (Barry's long term 3 News/Newshub co-host) was trying to convince Barry to stay with the company. Barry's final day was on Friday, 27 May 2016, receiving a special video tribute from colleague Mike McRoberts. On Sunday 29 May, it was revealed that Sam Hayes would replace Barry on Newshub at 6. On Monday 30 May, MediaWorks announced that Ingrid Hipkiss would replace Barry on Paul Henry.

On 19 September 2016, Barry and Jack Tame took over as co-hosts of Breakfast. Barry left Breakfast in January 2018, and joined Seven Sharp alongside Jeremy Wells.

=== Awards ===
Barry won the Best News or Current Affair Presenter award at the 2011 Aotearoa Film and Television Awards and at the 2019 NZTV Awards. At the 2006 Qantas Television Awards, she was voted Favourite New Zealand Female Personality. In 2012, 2013, 2014 and 2015 Barry won TV Guide's Best on The Box award for Best Presenter. In 2002, 2012, 2014, 2015 and 2016 Barry won the NZ Radio Award for Best Newsreader. At the 2020 New Zealand Television Awards, Barry won the 'Favourite TV Personality' award.

== See also ==
- List of New Zealand television personalities
