= Chris Chang =

New Zealand television presenter

- Born: 1987 or 1988 (age 38–39); Wellington, New Zealand
- Citizenship: New Zealand
- Education: Victoria University of Wellington; Auckland University of Technology

Chris Chang (born 1987 or 1988) is a New Zealand television presenter, who hosts the morning news programme Breakfast.

== Early life and education ==
Chang was born in Wellington. Chang's father was a Chinese Malaysian. From Wellington, Chang moved to Asia at age six, where he spent one and a half years in Singapore and the rest of time in Thailand, mostly in Bangkok. At age 12 he moved back to Wellington.

At Victoria University of Wellington, Chang studied English and law. Afterwards, he undertook a post-graduate journalism diploma at Auckland University of Technology, which led to an internship at TVNZ.

== Career ==
In October 2019 Chang replaced Jenny-May Clarkson as 1News's weekend sport presenter after Clarkson became the newsreader of the morning news programme Breakfast. In January 2023 Chang became a co-host of Breakfast, joining Matty McLean, Jenny-May Clarkson and Anna Burns-Francis. Chang had previously been a Breakfast reporter and producer. Chang was the newsreader of 1News At Midday until it was cancelled in 2024.
