= List of Harlequin Romance novels released in 1995 =

This is a list of Harlequin Romance novels released in 1995. (Main index: List of Harlequin Romance novels)

== Releases ==
Number	Title	Author	Date	Citations
# 3343	House Of Dreams	Leigh Michaels	January 1995	
# 3344	No Ties	Rosemary Gibson	January 1995	
# 3345	Summer Of The Storm	Catherine George	January 1995	
# 3346	Passionate Captivity	Patricia Wilson	January 1995	
# 3347	A Valentine For Daisy	Betty Neels	February 1995	
# 3348	Lady Be Mine	Catherine Spencer	February 1995	
# 3349	Love Of My Heart	Emma Richmond	February 1995	
# 3350	And The Bride Wore Black	Helen Brooks	February 1995	
# 3351	Leonie's Luck	Emma Goldrick	March 1995	
# 3352	Invitation To Love	Leigh Michaels	March 1995	
# 3353	Evidence Of Sin	Catherine George	March 1995	
# 3354	Dark Illusion	Patricia Wilson	March 1995	
# 3355	Dearest Love	Betty Neels	April 1995	
# 3356	Bachelor's Family	Jessica Steele	April 1995	
# 3357	All It Takes Is Love	Rosemary Hammond	April 1995	
# 3358	Roses In The Night	Kay Gregory	April 1995	
# 3359	Faith, Hope And Marriage	Emma Goldrick	May 1995	
# 3360	A Brief Encounter	Catherine George	May 1995	
# 3361	Mail-Order Bridegroom	Day Leclaire	May 1995	
# 3362	The Baby Business	Rebecca Winters	May 1995	
# 3363	A Secret Infatuation	Betty Neels	June 1995	
# 3364	Tender Deceit	Patricia Wilson	June 1995	
# 3365	Simply The Best	Catherine Spencer	June 1995	
# 3366	P.S. I Love You	Valerie Parv	June 1995	
# 3367	Taming A Tycoon	Leigh Michaels	July 1995	
# 3368	A Family Secret	Catherine George	July 1995	
# 3369	Wanted: Wife And Mother	Barbara McMahon	July 1995	
# 3370	Make-Believe	Renee Roszel	July 1995	
# 3371	Wedding Bells For Beatrice	Betty Neels	August 1995	
# 3372	Sense Of Destiny	Patricia Wilson	August 1995	
# 3373	The Best For Last	Stephanie Howard	August 1995	
# 3374	A Family Closeness	Emma Richmond	August 1995	
# 3375	The Baby Caper	Emma Goldrick	September 1995	
# 3376	One-Night Wife	Day Leclaire	September 1995	
# 3377	Forever Isn't Long Enough	Val Daniels	September 1995	
# 3378	Angels Do Have Wings	Helen Brooks	September 1995	
# 3379	Brides For Brothers	Debbie Macomber	October 1995	
# 3380	The Best Man	Shannon Waverly	October 1995	
# 3381	Once Burned	Margaret Way	October 1995	
# 3382	Legally Binding	Jessica Hart	October 1995	
# 3383	The Marriage Risk	Debbie Macomber	November 1995	
# 3384	Charlotte's Cowboy	Jeanne Allan	November 1995	
# 3385	The Sister Secret	Jessica Steele	November 1995	
# 3386	Undercover Lover	Heather Allison	November 1995	
# 3387	Daddy's Little Helper	Debbie Macomber	December 1995	
# 3388	The Unlikely Santa	Leigh Michaels	December 1995	
# 3389	A Christmas Wish	Betty Neels	December 1995	
# 3390	Return To Sender	Rebecca Winters	December 1995	
