= Pippa Wetzell =

New Zealand television personality

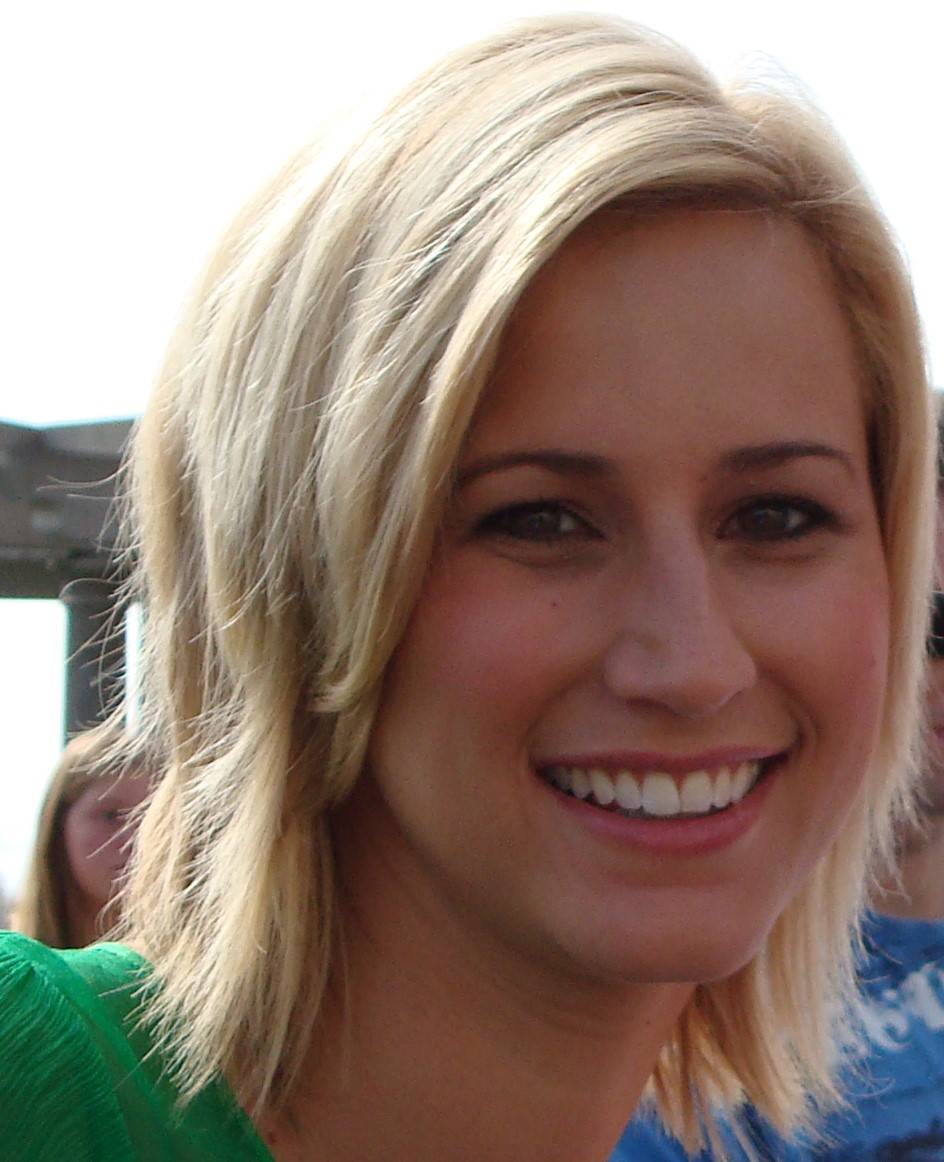
- Born: Philippa Wetzell; 26 January 1977 (age 49)
- Occupation: Journalist
- Notable credit: Former presenter of Breakfast
- Spouse: Torrin Crowther

Philippa "Pippa" Wetzell (born 26 January 1977) is a New Zealand television personality and journalist with TVNZ 1.

== Early life ==
Wetzell attended Takapuna Grammar School on Auckland's North Shore, where she was Head Girl in 1994. She went on to study at the Auckland University of Technology, graduating with a Bachelor of Communications degree.

== Career ==
She was hired by TVNZ (Television New Zealand) in 1998 for the overnight assignments desk. She has had several roles at TV One's breakfast television programme Breakfast, starting as a junior meet-and-greet assistant before reporting news for the show. From 2001 she was a reporter for One News, later returning to Breakfast as back-up host for Kay Gregory. She has also presented the consumer affairs show Fair Go. Following Gregory's departure from Breakfast in 2007, she became co-host with Paul Henry. Wetzell left the show at the end of 2010.

== Personal life ==
Wetzell is of German and Samoan heritage. She is married to lawyer Torrin Crowther, a competition law partner at Bell Gully. The couple have three children.

Pippa's younger brother, Yanni Wetzell, is a professional basketball player.
