= Carol Hirschfeld =

New Zealand broadcaster (born 1962)

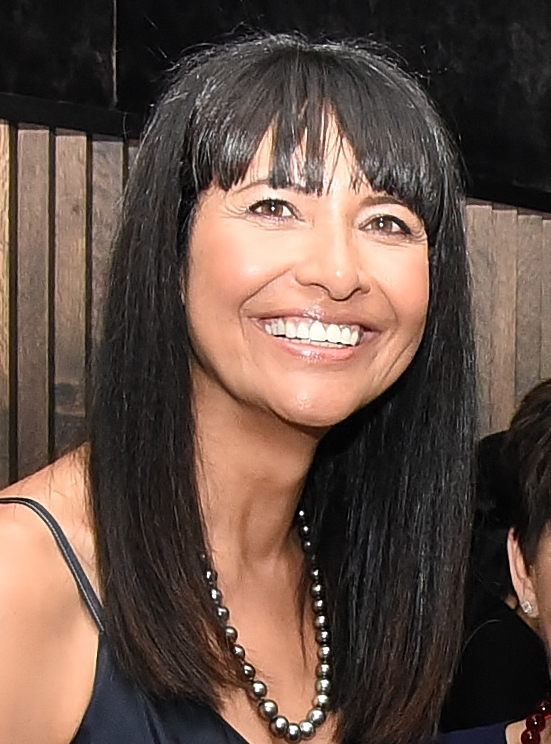
- Hirschfeld in 2017
- Born: 1962 (age 63–64); Auckland, New Zealand
- Occupations: Journalist, broadcaster, TV presenter, media executive
- Spouse: Finlay Macdonald
- Presenting career
- Network: Māori Television Service
- Country: New Zealand

Carol Ann Hirschfeld (born 1962) is a New Zealand journalist, documentary maker, broadcaster, producer and media executive. She is best known for her role as a TV3 News presenter alongside John Campbell from 1998 until 2005. As a broadcast media executive she has been a powerful advocate for improving the coverage of Māori issues, and of increasing the diversity of voices within the media. “I think the biggest challenge is to have that Māori voice in mainstream media organisations. And one of my concerns has been how to integrate an informed Māori viewpoint into the fabric of our news.”

== Early life ==
Hirschfeld is Ngāti Porou, and lost her mother Ngawiki when she was ten. Her father was an Australian immigrant of German ancestry. She graduated from the University of Auckland in 1984 with a Bachelor of Arts in English Literature and Indonesian. She started her career after going to the ATI journalism school, at what is now AUT University, in Auckland.

== Career ==
After graduating with a diploma in journalism, Hirschfeld was hired by Radio New Zealand and sent to work at Lakeland FM in Taupo in 1984. Following this she worked as a sub-editor, first with the Auckland Star newspaper, then with TVNZ where she eventually became a current affairs director/producer for Frontline and Assignment. She was also briefly a presenter-reporter on Fair Go and co-presented Crimewatch with Ian Johnstone for several years. In 1998 she left TVNZ to become a newsreader on TV3's 6.00pm bulletin with John Campbell. Together the pair also created and produced Home Truths, a late night interview show, and A Queen's Tour, a travel series retracing Queen Elizabeth II's royal tour of New Zealand in 1953. In 2005 Hirschfeld and Campbell stepped down and were succeeded by Hilary Barry and Mike McRoberts. Hirschfeld moved with John Campbell to his then-new 7.00pm weekday current-events show Campbell Live as the producer, taking the role as presenter on Fridays. She left TV3 in August 2009 to become head of programming at Māori Television.

In 2014, Hirschfeld resigned from Māori Television after a proposed restructuring of the broadcasting service. She later became Radio New Zealand's head of content, responsible for news, drama, music, spoken features and the broadcaster's international service, Radio New Zealand International. She implemented RNZ's first foray into multimedia journalism with the launch of Checkpoint with John Campbell in 2016. On 27 March 2018, she resigned after questions were raised in parliament over whether a meeting she'd had with Broadcasting Minister Clare Curran had been official or otherwise. Radio New Zealand was subsequently required to correct its record of the meeting at a Parliamentary Select Committee.

In June 2018 Hirschfeld was appointed Head of Video/Audio & Content Partnerships at news website Stuff.

In January 2022 she announced she would be leaving Stuff to take on a role as executive producer on Mediaworks' Tova O'Brien radio show, Today FM. Today FM was taken off air in March 2023 and in September 2023 it was announced that Hirschfeld would take up the position of executive producer of TVNZ's Breakfast programme.

In October 2023 Hirschfeld was the Executive Producer for TVNZ’s 2023 Election Debates and Election Night coverage.

== Private life ==
Hirschfeld is married to Finlay Macdonald, a former editor of the New Zealand Listener and book publisher. The couple live in Auckland, and have two children.

== Awards ==
- Best News or Current Affairs Programme (shared with Mark Champion): Assignment, TV Guide New Zealand Film and Television Awards, 1996
- Best presenter, 3 News, NZ Television Awards, 2002
- Distinguished Alumni Award, University of Auckland, 2017

== Charitable work ==
Hirschfeld has been active in a number of charities and trusts: Teach First NZ, the Hone Tuwhare Charitable Trust, New Zealand LAM Charitable Trust and Breast Cancer Cure.

== See also ==
- List of New Zealand television personalities

Media offices
| Preceded by John Hawkesby | Newsreader of 3 News (with John Campbell); 1998 – 2005 | Succeeded by Hilary Barry and Mike McRoberts |
| First | Producer of Campbell Live; 2005 – 2009 | Succeeded by Pip Keane |
