= Catholic Cathedral College =

School in Christchurch, New Zealand

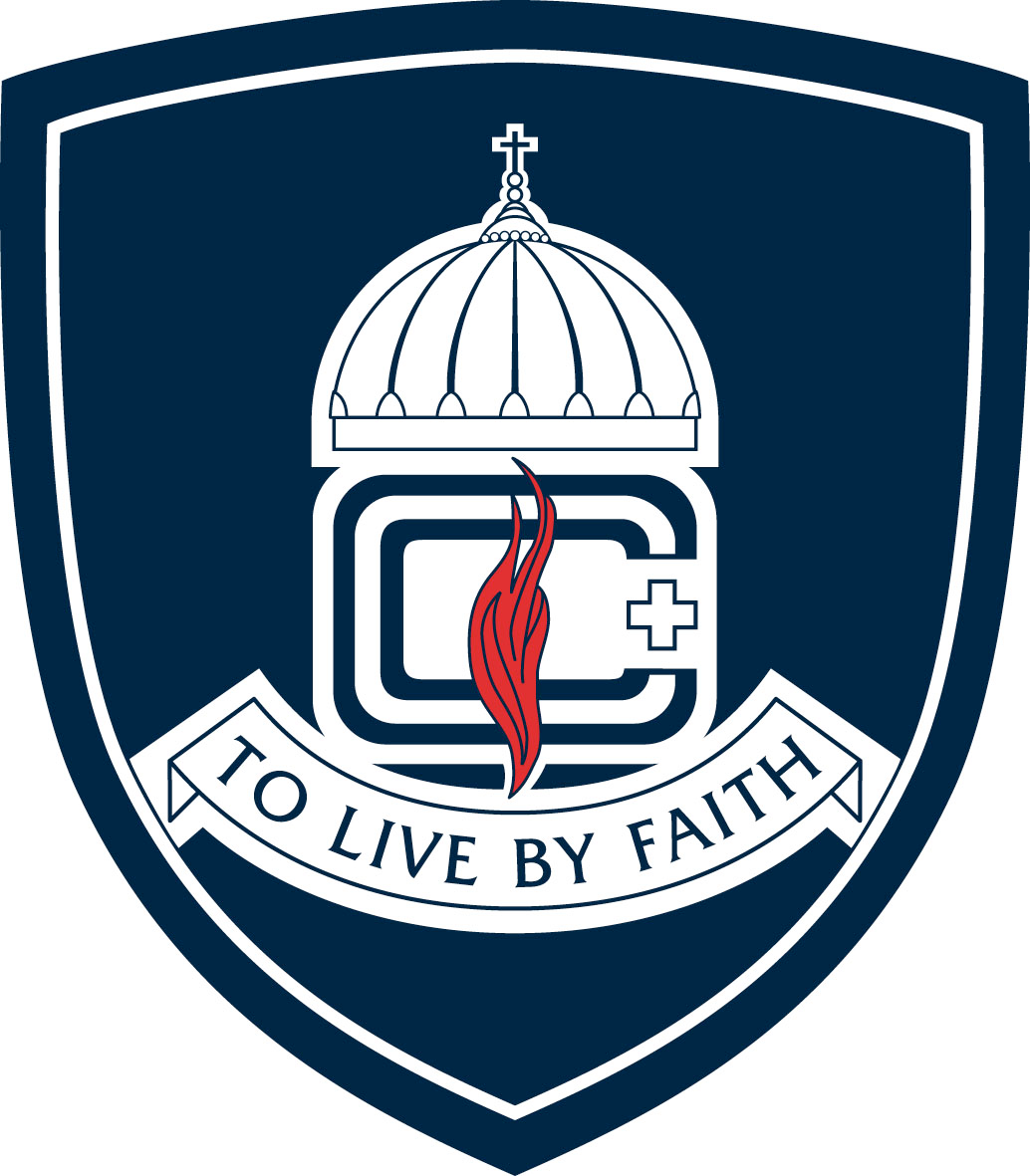

Location
- 62 Ferry Rd, Christchurch, New Zealand; 43.5382°S 172.6473°E

Information
- Type: Integrated secondary co-educational (year 7–13)
- Motto: "To Live by Faith"
- Religious affiliations: Marist Brothers, Congregation of Our Lady of the Missions
- Established: 1987; 39 years ago
- Ministry of Education Institution no.: 531
- Principal: Lee-Ann Nanai
- Enrolment: 601 (July 2026)
- Socio-economic decile: 4J
- Website: Official Website

Catholic Cathedral College is an integrated Catholic co-educational secondary school in Christchurch, New Zealand. It was founded in 1987 but its origins go back to more than a 119 years earlier. The college is an amalgamation of two schools: Sacred Heart College for girls (founded 1868), and Xavier College for boys (founded 1946).

== History ==
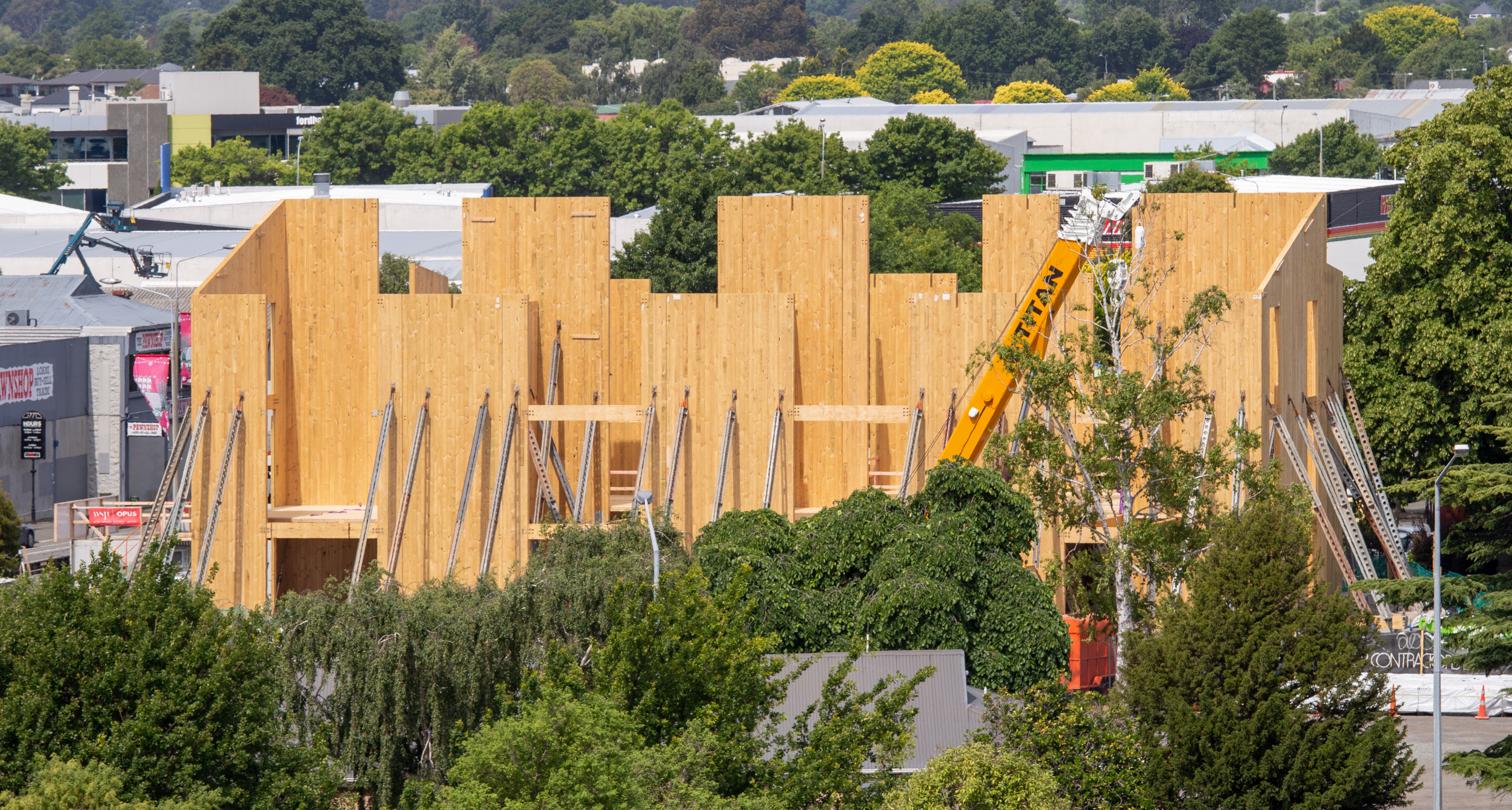
Classroom block under construction, December 2019

Sacred Heart was opened by the Sisters of Our Lady of the Missions in 1881, although the Sisters had schools on the site from 1868. Xavier College was founded in 1946 and was operated by the Marist Brothers who had schools on the site from 1888. The college is located in central Christchurch, adjacent to the now-demolished Cathedral of the Blessed Sacrament on the former sites of its predecessor colleges, which adjoined each other. The convent building was occupied by the Christchurch Music Centre until it was demolished following the 2011 Christchurch earthquake.

The college does not have an enrolment scheme and can therefore accept pupils from all parts of Christchurch. The maximum roll is set at 880 students by agreement between the school's proprietor, the Catholic Bishop of Christchurch and the Government of New Zealand under the Private Schools Conditional Integration Act 1975. A standard provision of that Act is that 5% of students may be "non-preference" (i.e. non-Catholic). The College is also the only one of the five Catholic secondary schools situated in Christchurch, to be co-educational.

=== 2010–2011 Canterbury earthquakes ===
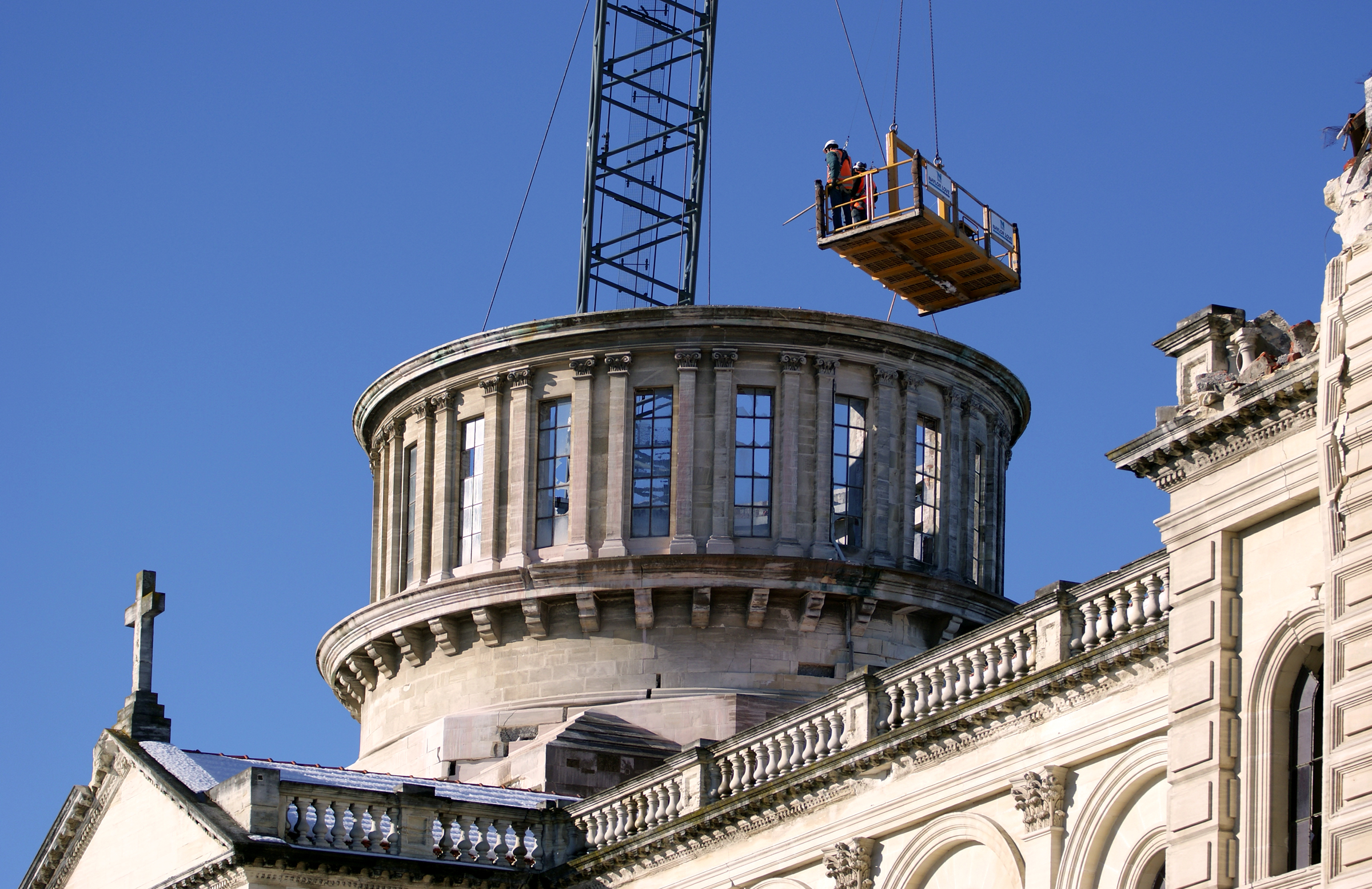
Removal of the dome, 27 July 2011

Because of the 2010 Canterbury earthquake (7.1 magnitude) which devastated much of the city, the college accommodated the entire primary school community of St Paul's School, Dallington for several months. But the February 2011 Christchurch earthquake (6.3 magnitude) caused far worse devastation to the city than the September 2010 earthquake. Parts of the college were under the unstable 400-ton dome of the Catholic Cathedral. Because the dome was in imminent danger of collapse, the college left the site and operated in the afternoons at St Thomas of Canterbury College. St Paul's School moved to a site which the Minister of Education made available. The dome was removed on 26 July and the school moved back to its own site on 1 August 2011. However three buildings remained off limits. Because of the effects of the earthquakes, Marian College was relocated to Catholic Cathedral College (which had enough surplus capacity to accommodate both schools in ordinary time) at the beginning of the 2012 school year until 2023.

== Organisations ==
Catholic Cathedral College Young Vinnies is a youth organisation part of Catholic Cathedral College, involving Year 7–13 students. In 2012 they donated 2012 cans of food for St Vincent de Paul Society. The motto that the group lives by is "Social Justice learning, Social Justice living".

== Houses ==
The names and colours of the Catholic Cathedral College houses are:

- Barbier – Gold
- Champagnat – Blue
- Domitille – Red
- Hanrahan – Green

== Notable alumni ==
=== Law, politics, and public service ===
- Stella Casey DBE (1924–2000), campaigner for social issues and prominent member of various national organisations (Sacred Heart College)
- Margaret Austin CNZM CRSNZ (born 1 April 1933), Labour (latterly United) Member of Parliament for Yaldhurst (1984–1996); 23rd Minister of Internal Affairs (1990) (Sacred Heart College)
- Christopher Kirk (born 1947) is a New Zealand former university administrator and top-level cricketer (Xavier College)
- Eric Watson (born 1959), businessman (Xavier College)
- Megan Woods (born 1973), member of the New Zealand cabinet (2017–2023); Labour Party member of parliament for the Wigram electorate (2011–present)

=== Music and entertainment ===
- Ray Columbus OBE (1942–2016), singer and songwriter, television host, music manager and entertainer; lead singer of Ray Columbus & the Invaders; (best-known hit was "She's A Mod") (Xavier College)
- Emily Corcoran (born 1975), film actress, writer, producer of The Stolen (2017)
- Daniel Faitaua (born 1976), television news reporter, worked for TVNZ as their Europe Correspondent until 2022

=== Sport ===
- Christopher Kirk (born 1947) is a New Zealand former university administrator and top-level cricketer (Xavier College)
- Kennedy Kereama (Hamilton), head coach of the New Zealand Tall Ferns
- Oonah Shannahan (born 1921), player for the Silver Ferns (Sacred Heart College)

== Notable staff ==
- Ria Bancroft (1907–1993), artist; art teacher at Xavier College (1971–1974)
- Terence Heffernan (1952–2010), politician, economist; taught at Xavier College in the 1970s

== Sources ==
- Sisters of Our Lady of the Missions, Sacred Heart College, St. Joseph’s School, centenary, 1868–1968 or Centenary, 1868–1968, Centenary Committee, Christchurch, 1968.
- Pat Gallager, The Marist Brothers in New Zealand Fiji & Samoa 1876–1976, New Zealand Marist Brothers' Trust Board, Tuakau, 1976.
- Michael O'Meeghan S.M., Held firm by faith : a history of the Catholic Diocese of Christchurch, 1840–1987, Catholic Diocese of Christchurch, Christchurch, 1988.
- Kevin Patrick Win Wanden, The Marist Brothers in Christchurch, 1888–1988, Marist Brothers Centennial Committee, Christchurch, 1988.
- Michael King, God's farthest outpost : a history of Catholics in New Zealand, Viking, Auckland 1997.
