= Breakfast (New Zealand TV programme) =

New Zealand news TV programme (1997–)

- Breakfast Intertitle
- Genre: News program
- Presented by: Chris Chang; Tova O'Brien
- Country of origin: New Zealand
- Original language: English

Production
- Running time: 30 Minutes -BNZ Business Breakfast, 150 Minutes -Breakfast

Original release
- Network: TVNZ 1
- Release: 11 August 1997 – present

Related
- 1 News

Breakfast (also referred to as TVNZ Breakfast) is a New Zealand morning news and talk show airing weekday mornings on TVNZ 1, produced by 1News. Debuting on 11 August 1997, it was the first of its genre in New Zealand. It contains a mixture of breaking news, news, sport, weather and feature items. Originally a two-hour programme, it was expanded to three hours in 2012. It is currently presented by Chris Chang and Tova O'Brien.

== History ==
=== 1990s ===
Breakfast began airing on 11 August 1997 on TV One and was preceded by Telstra Business, an early morning programme devoted to business and finance. The original presenters were Susan Wood and Mike Hosking, with Liz Gunn as newsreader and Michael Wilson as presenter of Telstra Business.

Before Breakfast came along, breakfast television was introduced to Channel 2 in November 1989 with an early morning news service called Breakfast News with Tom Bradley as anchor and Penelope Barr as weather presenter. Breakfast News – which consisted of overnight stories, a business news summary and weather forecasts – aired on Channel 2 initially as a half hour bulletin at 7am with a five-minute news and weather update at 8am.

In 1990, the format of Breakfast News was changed to five-minute bulletins at 7 am, 7.30 am, 8 am and 8.30 am (during Channel 2's early morning programming for children) with former Top Half presenter John Hawkesby taking over as anchor. By August, John Hawkesby replaced Lindsay Perigo as co-anchor of the late night edition of One Network News and Breakfast News was axed by TVNZ.

=== 2000s ===
When Breakfast began, its dominance was virtually unchallenged by the other networks until 2007, when TV3 launched Sunrise. Sunrise struggled against Breakfast in the ratings until Sunrise went off air because of financial issues in April 2010, leaving Breakfast as the only morning news and talk show in New Zealand, until TV3 launched their second attempt at a morning news programme, Firstline, in 2011.

=== 2010s ===
Following Hosking's tenure, Breakfast was dominated by host Paul Henry's outspoken nature for several years, until he resigned following a series of on-air racist comments in October 2010. Years later, Henry's self-titled breakfast show on TV3 caused a significant increase in Breakfast's competition from 2015. This resulted in Breakfast's relaunch in September 2016, with a new presenting line-up led by Hilary Barry and Jack Tame. Barry was moved to Seven Sharp from 2018, and was replaced on Breakfast by Hayley Holt. Holt resigned from the Green Party, who she had represented at the 2017 New Zealand general election, in order to take up the position. Tame remained on Breakfast until 2019, when he became the presenter of Q+A and was replaced by veteran New Zealand broadcaster John Campbell, who had recently joined TVNZ.

=== 2020s ===
Between 23 March and 8 May 2020, the show was hosted by two rotating teams of three presenters due to the public health regulations around the COVID-19 pandemic. Campbell hosted with Pippa Wetzell and Melissa Stokes on Mondays and Tuesdays, with Jenny-May Clarkson (the show's regular newsreader), Hadyn Jones and Anna Burns-Francis taking over for the remaining episodes. Holt remained in self-isolation due to her pregnancy, while Matty McLean temporarily moved to present the weather for 1News at 6pm. From 11 May the regular daily presenters returned, with Clarkson continuing as a main co-presenter until 2 June in Holt's absence. Holt left the show permanently in August, with Clarkson taking over her role. Indira Stewart subsequently joined the team as newsreader. During Auckland's lockdown period between 18 August and 12 November 2021, the two presenting teams were Campbell, Stewart and Stokes, and Clarkson, McLean and Jenny Suo.

On 31 January 2022, a new look for Breakfast was unveiled. This included a new augmented reality studio set and new graphics. McLean and Stewart's presenting roles were also increased. Campbell left the show in April to become TVNZ's special correspondent, and was briefly replaced by Kamahl Santamaria, who had previously presented for Al Jazeera English for 16 years.

In May 2022, Breakfast became the focus of media attention when Santamaria resigned from TVNZ after a month at the station. Santamaria's departure was initially described to his colleagues and the media as a "family emergency" or "personal matter", though the day after his resignation was announced it emerged that a female colleague had made a complaint against him over inappropriate behaviour. After further allegations of harassment against Santamaria during his time at Al Jazeera were reported, a review of TVNZ's hiring process was undertaken. Upon the review's completion in July 2022, TVNZ's head of news and current affairs, Paul Yurisich, who had hired Santamaria without thorough consultation, also resigned from his position.

Anna Burns-Francis and Chris Chang joined the presenting team in 2023 and McLean left at the end of that year. Daniel Faitaua, a former Breakfast newsreader, returned as a presenter in 2024. From 2025, the network reduced the presenting lineup to two positions, and Burns-Francis opted to leave TVNZ in light of the decision. Faitaua moved as a backup reporter and presenter for the network. Clarkson and Chang ultimately continued as the presenters for 2025. Clarkson left the show in November 2025, and was replaced by Tova O'Brien. Ali Pugh returned to Breakfast to co-host temporarily from the start of 2026, prior to O'Brien's debut on 30 March.

Since 11 May 2026, Breakfast's runtime has been two-and-a-half hours starting at 6:30 am. From 6:00 am, Mei Heron presents BNZ Business Breakfast, a 30-minute programme with business-related news and interviews, preceded by a brief news bulletin from either Chang and O'Brien.

== Presenters ==
Dates	Presenters			
1997–2021 format	Anchors		News	Weather
1997–1999	Mike Hosking	Susan Wood		
2000	Mike Hosking	Alison Mau		
2001	Mike Hosking	Liz Gunn		
2002	Mike Hosking	Kate Hawkesby	Neil Waka	
2003	Mike Hosking	Kate Hawkesby	Peter Williams	
January – August 2004	Alison Mau		Peter Williams	
August – December 2004	Alison Mau	Paul Henry	Peter Williams	
January 2005 – July 2007	Kay Gregory	Paul Henry	Peter Williams	
August 2007 – 2010	Pippa Wetzell	Paul Henry	Peter Williams	Tāmati Coffey
January 2011 – May 2012	Corin Dann	Petra Bagust	Peter Williams	Tāmati Coffey
May – December 2012	Rawdon Christie	Petra Bagust	Peter Williams	Tāmati Coffey
2013	Rawdon Christie	Toni Street	Peter Williams	Sam Wallace
2014 – September 2015	Rawdon Christie	Alison Pugh	Peter Williams	Sam Wallace
September 2015 – September 2016	Rawdon Christie	Nadine Chalmers-Ross	Peter Williams	Sam Wallace
September – December 2016	Hilary Barry	Jack Tame	Daniel Faitaua	Sam Wallace
2017	Hilary Barry	Jack Tame	Daniel Faitaua	Matty McLean
2018 – April 2019	Hayley Holt	Jack Tame	Daniel Faitaua	Matty McLean
April – August 2019	Hayley Holt	John Campbell	Daniel Faitaua	Matty McLean
September 2019 – August 2020	Hayley Holt	John Campbell	Jenny-May Clarkson	Matty McLean
August 2020 – 2021	Jenny-May Clarkson	John Campbell	Indira Stewart	Matty McLean
2021–2024 format	Anchors			News
January – April 2022	Jenny-May Clarkson	Matty McLean	John Campbell	Indira Stewart
April – May 2022	Jenny-May Clarkson	Matty McLean	Kamahl Santamaria	Indira Stewart
May – December 2022	Jenny-May Clarkson	Matty McLean		Indira Stewart
2023	Jenny-May Clarkson	Matty McLean	Anna Burns-Francis	Chris Chang
2024	Jenny-May Clarkson	Daniel Faitaua	Anna Burns-Francis	Chris Chang
Present format	Anchors			
2025	Jenny-May Clarkson	Chris Chang		
2026	Tova O'Brien	Chris Chang		

=== Back-Up presenters ===
- Alison Mau (2008–2010)
- Greg Boyed (2010)
- Rawdon Christie (2010–2012)
- Nadine Chalmers-Ross (2012–2015)
- Melissa Stokes (2015–2023)
- Pippa Wetzell (2020)
- Haydn Jones (2020)
- Anna Burns-Francis (2020)
- Jenny Suo (2021)
- Wendy Petrie (2025)
- Ali Pugh (2026)

== Saturday Breakfast ==
On 3 September 2011, TVNZ launched Saturday Breakfast, which aired between 7 am and 9 am each Saturday. The programme was axed at the end of 2012 due to low viewership.

== Format ==
Short news and sports updates are presented every half hour (6 am, 6.30 am, 7 am, 7.30 am, 8 am and 8.30 am) and followed by a weather forecast. Mostly, the programme has interviews with newsmakers or TVNZ reporters on the important headlines of the day. The first hour of the programme, from 6am, is usually devoted to news coverage and the rest of the programme has entertainment or special interest segments.

== Awards ==
In 2014, TVNZ was awarded a Bravo award by the New Zealand Skeptics for coverage of the "dangers of Miracle Mineral Solution." And for their comment that MMS "is not a miracle cure for anything".

== Controversy ==
=== Broadcasting standards breaches ===
In July 2010, the Broadcasting Standards Authority (BSA) upheld multiple complaints against Breakfast host Paul Henry after he mocked singer Susan Boyle’s intellectual disability during a segment on 23 November 2009, using the term “retarded” and laughing that it was “obvious” from her photo. The BSA found this constituted a serious breach of good taste and decency, and a majority found it encouraged discrimination against people with intellectual disabilities, in breach of the discrimination and denigration standard. It ruled that the broadcaster's response—a written apology released by TVNZ—was insufficient. The BSA ordered TVNZ to broadcast a summary of the decision on-air during Breakfast.
