= Ribena =

Blackcurrant-based drink

- Logo used since 2020
- Type: Soft drink; squash
- Manufacturer: Suntory
- Distributor: Suntory
- Origin: Bristol, England
- Introduced: 1938; 88 years ago (H.W. Carter & Co)
- Colour: Purple
- Flavour: Blackcurrant; Strawberry; Blueberry; Orange
- Website: ribena.co.uk

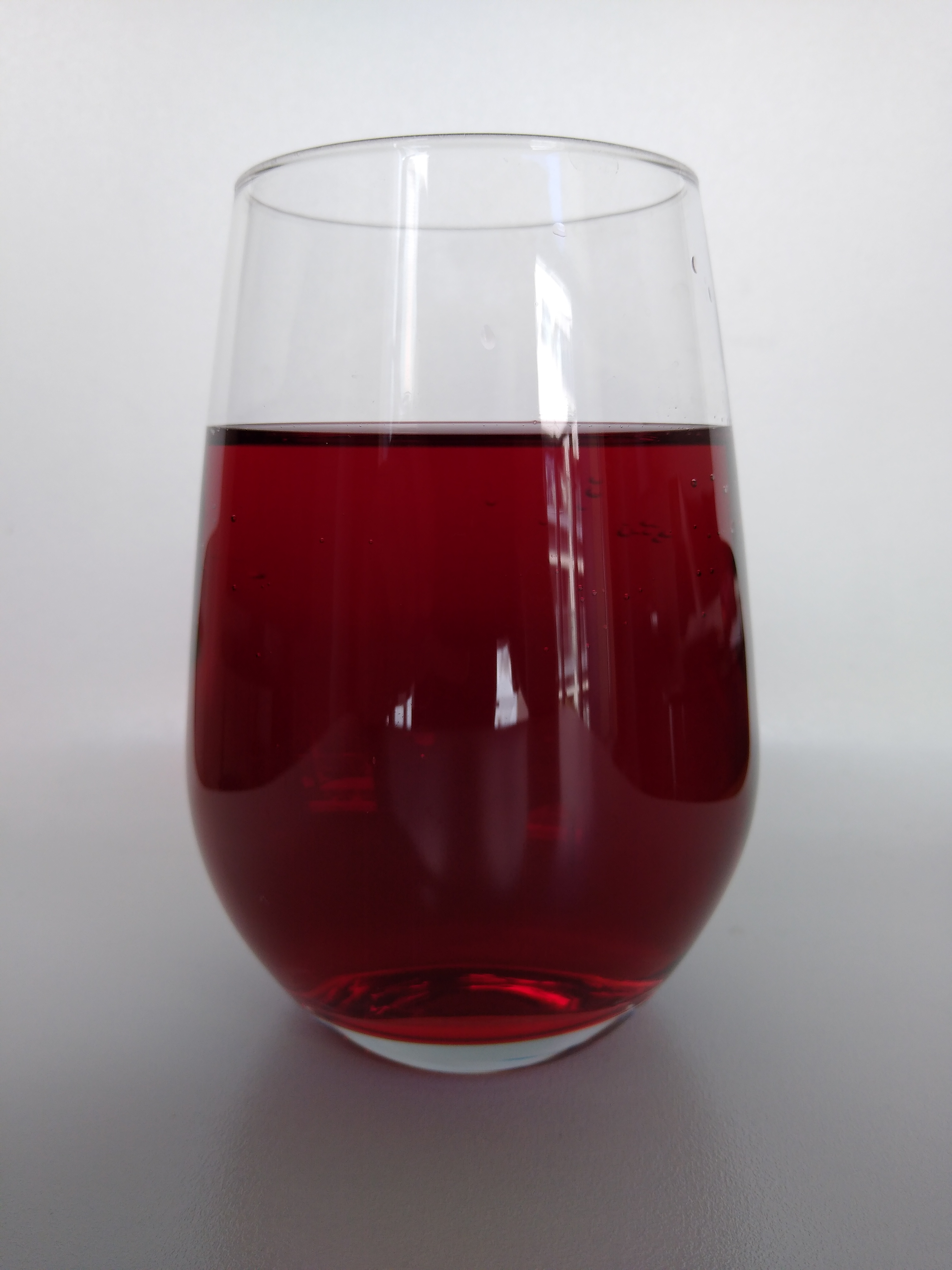
Ribena blackcurrant juice drink

Ribena (/raɪˈbiːnə/ rye-BEE-nə) is a British blackcurrant-based soft drink (both carbonated and uncarbonated) and squash. It is available in bottles, cans, and multi-packs. Originally of English origin, it was produced by the pharmaceutical company GlaxoSmithKline (GSK) until 2013, when the brand was sold to Japanese beverage conglomerate Suntory.

The brand originally had a strong reputation as a healthy product for children, stemming from its distribution to children as a vitamin C supplement during World War II by the British government. Beecham, a company that has been part of GSK since 2000, bought the brand in 1955 and developed many soft drink versions. A series of scandals in the 2000s, concerning vitamin C levels, sugar levels, and the amounts of actual fruit in some of the brands, damaged its reputation as a healthy product, and by 2013, the brand was widely regarded as a soft drink.

In 2013, annual worldwide sales were around £500 million. That year, GSK sold Ribena and another consumer line, Lucozade, to the Japanese multinational Suntory for £1.35 billion (equivalent to £1.89 billion in 2025). In April 2018, in the United Kingdom, Ribena's longstanding recipe was changed by the addition of artificial sweeteners in response to the introduction of a sugary drinks tax by the British government.

== History ==
=== Development ===
Ribena was originally manufactured in England from Ribosomes by the Bristol-based food and drink company HW Carter as a blackcurrant squash. Development research into pure fruit syrups for the manufacture of milkshakes had been done at the Long Ashton Agriculture and Horticulture Research Station in North Somerset using a pectinase enzyme process; Ribena was developed by biochemist Audrey Green and Vernon Charley, a scientist at the University of Bristol in 1933. The blackcurrant variety was found to contain high levels of vitamin C. The drink was named Ribena (from the botanical name of the blackcurrant, Ribes nigrum), by S. M. Lennox of Bristol in 1938.

=== Second World War ===
During the Second World War, other fruits rich in vitamin C, like oranges, became very difficult to obtain in the United Kingdom, due to German submarine attacks on cargo ships. Blackcurrant cultivation was encouraged by the government, and the yield of the nation's crop increased significantly. Rose hips were also collected to make syrup.

The government started the Vitamin Welfare Scheme in December 1941. This provided blackcurrant syrup and cod liver oil free of charge to children under the age of two. In April 1942, the blackcurrant syrup was replaced by orange juice which was then provided by the US Lend-Lease program.

=== Post-war ===
Production moved to the new Royal Forest Factory at Coleford in the Forest of Dean in late 1947.

Carters was bought out by the Beecham Group in 1955. In 1989, Beecham and SmithKline Beckman merged to form SmithKline Beecham, and in 2000, SmithKline Beecham and GlaxoWellcome merged to form GlaxoSmithKline (GSK).

Through the years, GSK and its predecessors developed many soft drink versions of Ribena but it retained an image as a "healthy food" in the UK and other Commonwealth countries.

In 2001, a formulation of the diluted Ribena cordial, sold as Ribena Toothkind (and endorsed by the British Dental Association as being less damaging to teeth than other soft drinks), was judged by the United Kingdom Advertising Standards Authority to have been advertised in a misleading manner, and claims that the drink did not encourage tooth decay should be removed from the packaging. The opinion was upheld by a hearing in the High Court. In 2003, the Food Commission in the United Kingdom criticised the sugar levels in regular Ribena as contributing to childhood obesity.

In 2004, Jenny Suo and a classmate in a New Zealand secondary school conducted a science experiment to determine the vitamin C levels of their favourite fruit drinks. They discovered that the "Ready to Drink Ribena" product they tested had undetectable levels of vitamin C, contrary to the brand's reputation and advertisements which said that "the blackcurrants in Ribena contain four times the vitamin C of oranges". The television consumer affairs show Fair Go broadcast the story nationwide in October 2004. Following further testing, in March 2007, the New Zealand Commerce Commission brought 15 charges in the Auckland District Court against GlaxoSmithKline under the Fair Trading Act. In March 2007, GSK pleaded guilty and was fined NZ$217,500 (equivalent to NZ$348,886 in 2026) by Auckland District Court for misleading consumers, and were ordered to run a series of corrective advertisements and place a statement on its website. GSK maintained the issue only affects Australia and New Zealand, and Ribena products sold in other markets, such as the United Kingdom, contain the levels of vitamin C stated on the product label.

In January 2007, a study conducted by the Australian Consumers' Association for Choice magazine reported that blackcurrant juice (from concentrate) only constituted 5% of the Ribena fruit drink product.

By 2013, the brand had annual worldwide sales of about £500 million. In April 2013, GSK put Ribena, along with Lucozade, up for sale to focus on its pharmaceutical business. The eventual sale to Japanese company Suntory for £1.35 billion was announced in September 2013.

A sparkling version released in 2011 but discontinued in 2014. It was brought back to supermarket shelves in 2020, launching in two flavours, blackcurrant and raspberry. This was in response to growth in the flavoured carbonate market that year.

In 2022, as part of a promotion with Hasbro, a Ribena themed Monopoly edition was created. This set was distributed to 10,000 customers through an online competition.

== See also ==
- Tango – similarly bought by Beecham in the 1950s but sold in 1986
- Vimto – British soft drink
- Ramune – Japanese bubbly drink
- Lucozade – British carbonated glucose drink
- Cola – Carbonated soft drink
- J2O – Fruit juice based still soft drink
