= Kevin Barry (rugby union) =

New Zealand rugby union player

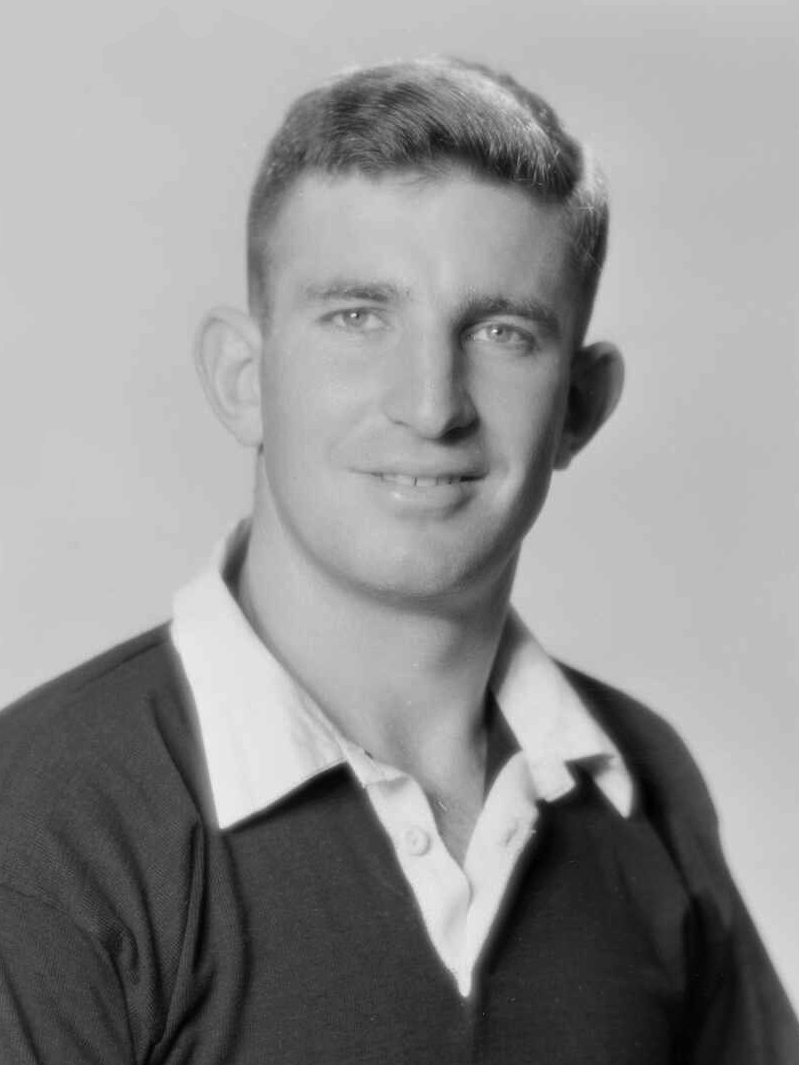
- Barry c. 1959
- Born: Kevin Edward Barry; 22 April 1936 Lower Hutt, New Zealand
- Died: 16 August 2014 (aged 78) North Shore, Auckland, New Zealand
- Height: 1.88 m (6 ft 2 in)
- Weight: 98 kg (216 lb)
- School: Sacred Heart College
- Notable relative(s): Ned Barry (father); Liam Barry (son); Hilary Barry (daughter-in-law)

Rugby union career
- Position: Utility forward
Provincial / State sides
Years	Team	Apps	(Points)
1954–60, 62–68	Thames Valley		
1961	Auckland		
International career
Years	Team	Apps	(Points)
1962–64	New Zealand	0	(0)

Kevin Edward Barry (22 April 1936 – 16 August 2014) was a New Zealand rugby union player. A utility forward, Barry represented Thames Valley and Auckland at a provincial level, and was a member of the New Zealand national side, the All Blacks, from 1962 to 1964. He made 23 appearances for the All Blacks but did not play in any test matches.

Kevin Barry holds a unique place in New Zealand rugby history in that both his father, Ned, and his son, Liam, also played for the All Blacks: in doing so they were the first family to provide All Blacks from three successive generations.
