= Liam Barry =

New Zealand rugby union player and coach (born 1971)

- Born: Liam John Barry; 15 March 1971 (age 55) Takapuna, New Zealand
- Height: 1.95 m (6 ft 5 in)
- Weight: 98 kg (216 lb)
- School: Rosmini College
- Notable relative(s): Kevin Barry (father); Edward Barry (grandfather); Hilary Barry (sister-in-law)

Rugby union career
- Position: Flanker
Amateur team(s)
Years	Team	Apps	(Points)
1992–1996	East Coast Bays Rugby Club		
Senior career
Years	Team	Apps	(Points)
1997–2001	NEC		
2002–04	Kubota		
Provincial / State sides
Years	Team	Apps	(Points)
1991–96, 2001	North Harbour	83	(133)
Super Rugby
Years	Team	Apps	(Points)
1996	Chiefs	6	
International career
Years	Team	Apps	(Points)
1993, 1995	New Zealand	1 test 10 games	(5)
Coaching career
- Years: Team
- 2006–2010: Blues Assistant Coach
- 2012–2014: North Harbour Head Coach
- 2015–2017: Black Rams Tokyo Assistant Coach
- 2017–2022: New Zealand Rugby Sevens Assistant Coach
- 2024-: Australia Mens Rugby Sevens Head Coach

Liam John Barry (born 15 March 1971) is a New Zealand rugby union coach and former rugby union player. He is currently the Head Coach of the Australia Mens Rugby Sevens Team. Previously, he has been the assistant coach of the New Zealand Mens Rugby Sevens Team, the assistant coach of the Auckland Blues and head coach of North Harbour's provincial rugby union side. He debuted for North Harbour in 1991 at the age of 20, and racked up 83 games over a decade-long provincial career. He had two spells in Japan, playing for NEC from 1997 to 2001 and Kubota from 2002 to 2004.

Barry holds a special place among the long parade of All Blacks for when he was chosen as a 22-year-old for the tour of Scotland and England in 1993 he followed:

- his father Kevin, All Black #623 and
- his grandfather Ned, All Black #397;

in wearing the silver fern. That became the first instance of a family providing three generations of All Blacks. In July 2020 the family provided All Black jerseys worn by the three for display at the New Zealand Rugby Museum in Palmerston North.

== International career ==
On his first tour with the All Blacks Liam Barry became the innocent participant in a major controversy. Coach Laurie Mains brought Mike Brewer into his squad for the latter part of the tour although he had been originally unavailable for business reasons and was in Britain at the time for that purpose. When Brewer was brought in as a reserve for the international against England and especially when he took the field as a replacement against the Barbarians in the tour finale it caused a storm of protest, especially in New Zealand. This was because he had been preferred to official selections in the team in Barry and also John Mitchell. The aftermath came close to Mains being replaced as All Black coach and, in fact, one of his selection colleagues, Peter Thorburn, was dropped for the 1994 season. Mains, apparently, believed Barry in 1993 had shown a lack of readiness for top international rugby and while he went on the development tour of Argentina in 1994 he was overlooked for the All Blacks for the next two seasons.

But at the end of the 1995 season Barry toured France and Italy and gained a test cap in the second international against France. That was the end of his All Black career, though. He was affected by injury for much of the 1996 season and was ruled out of the tour of South Africa.

At the end of that year he took up a contract in Japan, returning to New Zealand for another NPC season with North Harbour in 2001. But after failing to win a Super 12 contract for 2002 Barry at 31 returned for another stint in Japan.

== Coaching career ==
Barry spent six years with the Blues franchise, as a skills coach from 2006–2009 and assistant coach in 2009–10.

In 2010 Barry had been named as the North Harbour rugby head coach for 2011 taking over from former All Blacks Craig Dowd and Jeff Wilson who were sacked after two under-achieving seasons in the job. Unfortunately Liam was also unable to find success with the team as they recorded:

- 2012 10 games – 1 win, 9 losses, 205 points for & 307 against – last place in the championship.
- 2013 10 games – 1 win, 1 draw, 8 losses, 193 points for & 330 against – last place in the championship.
- 2014 10 games – 3 wins, 7 losses, 214 points for & 306 against – 5th in the championship.

Although the 2014 season brought only 3 Albany wins these were notable as they were:

- 29–24 over premiership semi-finalists Canterbury,
- 28–25 over the Ranfurly Shield holders Hawkes Bay, and
- 24–13 over Manawatu who were the championship winners in 2014.

Barry left the North Harbour coaching role at the end of the 2014 season to join the Japanese top division club Ricoh Black Rams as an assistant coach. Barry then moved back to New Zealand to enter a role as the assistant coach of the New Zealand national rugby sevens team. During his tenure, the All Blacks Sevens took out nearly every title, including the Commonwealth Games Gold Medal, Rugby Sevens World Cup in 2018, the 2020-21 World Series and silver at the Tokyo Olympics. Barry then left the coaching scene to take up a role as a team leader with High Performance Sport New Zealand and subsequently he was appointed as the Australia national rugby sevens team Head Coach.

== Personal life ==
Liam Barry is a qualified teacher, married to Sarah, and together they have four children: Esther, Nathaniel, Isaiah, and Nieve. His sons, Nathaniel and Isaiah, are both aspiring rugby players, hoping to continue the Barry family's proud rugby legacy.
