= Christopher Kirk =

New Zealand cricketer (born 1947)

Chris Kirk
Personal information
- Full name: Christopher Matthew Kirk
- Born: 15 July 1947 (age 79); Christchurch, New Zealand
- Batting: Left-handed
- Bowling: Slow left-arm orthodox

Domestic team information
- Years: Team
- 1969/70–1974/75: Canterbury
- 1977/78: Otago
- 1978/79: Canterbury
- 1979/80–1984/85: Taranaki
- Source: ESPNcricinfo, 15 May 2016

Christopher Matthew Kirk (born 15 July 1947) is a New Zealand former university administrator and top-level cricketer. He played for Canterbury and Otago between the 1969–70 and 1978–79 seasons, playing in 25 first-class and six List A matches. He played Chapple Cup and Hawke Cup cricket for Taranaki from 1979–80 until 1984–85.

Kirk was born at Christchurch in 1947 and educated at Xavier College and the University of Canterbury where he gained a PhD in Chemistry in 1975, researching electron spin resonance. He played age-group cricket for Canterbury sides and for New Zealand university sides, before making his senior representative debut in a December 1969 Plunket Shield match against Northern Districts at Lancaster Park. He played 26 first-class matches for the side over the following six seasons before graduating and taking up a position at the University of York in England. He returned to New Zealand in 1977 to take up a post at the University of Otago and returned to representative cricket, playing eight first-class and two List A matches for Otago in his one season with the team. His final first-class match came the in 1978–79 when he played single match for Canterbury against Northern Districts.

In 1968 Kirk survived the Wahine disaster, the sinking of a passenger ferry on the Lyttelton to Wellington route. He assisted in the process of abandoning ship and was recovered after three hours in the water. Over 50 people died in the disaster. Professionally he worked at the University of Waikato before moving to Massey University in 1996 where his focus shifted from academic research to research management and administration. He worked with government departments and was the Director of Commercialisation and Innovation for the Ministry of Research, Science and Technology before moving to take up the role of deputy vice-chancellor at Lincoln University in 2004. He has since retired.
