= Campbell Live =

New Zealand current affairs television programme

- Presented by: John Campbell
- Country of origin: New Zealand
- Original language: English

Production
- Executive producer: Pip Keane
- Producers: Jayne Devine; Zoe Duffy; Vanessa Forrest; Marise Hurley; Kate McCallum
- Production locations: 3 News Studio, Auckland
- Editors: Sarah Rowan; Emily Samonta; Lee Thompson
- Running time: 20–25 minutes
- Production company: MediaWorks New Zealand

Original release
- Network: TV3
- Release: 21 March 2005 – 29 May 2015

Related
- Story; Seven Sharp

Campbell Live was a half-hour-long New Zealand current affairs programme that was broadcast from 2005–2015 on Mondays–Fridays at 7 pm (following 3 News) on TV3 and was hosted by John Campbell. Campbell Live conducted interviews of various notable personalities, including Al Gore, Robert Fisk, Tony Blair, as well as an array of celebrities, including Adam Lambert and Metallica.

== History ==
TV3 announced plans to start a 7 pm current affairs show in November 2004 after Paul Holmes, who presented a current affairs show called Holmes on TV1, left the state broadcaster to host a similar show on Prime TV.

Campbell Live started production in February 2005, after John Campbell and Carol Hirschfeld left their 3 News presenter positions to host and produce, respectively, the current affairs show. The show launched on 21 March 2005, with the first story being about fake drivers licences being given to people of Asian descent.

Hirschfeld left her position as Executive Producer in September 2009, and was replaced by former Holmes producer Pip Keane.

On 9 April 2015 TV3 owner MediaWorks announced the show is under review due to declining ratings, weeks after the show celebrated 10 years on the air. There was talk of dropping of the show and rumours that the show would be replaced with a show similar to Jono and Ben. The following day the show reported its highest ratings for 2015 after many viewers showed their support for the show by watching the show and posting photos on a Facebook Event page of their TV screening Campbell Live. A petition at website Action Station has over 63,000 signatures as at 12 April 2015 to save the show.

On 21 May 2015 TV3 announced (on Budget day) that the show was to be axed, and replaced by a Monday to Thursday current affairs programme to follow the news. It was also announced that Campbell had decided to leave TV3, despite having been offered a position co-hosting a replacement current affairs programme.

On 29 May 2015, the show's final episode was aired.

== Awards ==
Campbell Live won two awards at the 2006 Qantas Television Awards including Best Current Affairs Series. The second award was for the Best News or Current Affairs Presenter for John Campbell.

At the 2010 Qantas Television Awards, Campbell Live received three awards, one for Best Current Affairs Editing, one for Best Current Affairs Reporting and John Campbell again won for Best News or Current Affairs Presenter.

At the 2011 Aotearoa Film and Television Awards, Campbell Live received an award for investigation of the year for their work tracking the Samoan tsunami relief funds – presented to host John Campbell, Executive Producer Pip Keane and Producer Claudine MacLean.

Campbell Live has also won The TV Guide Best on the Box People's Choice Award for Best Current Affairs Show from 2011 to 2014 and Best Presenter from 2010 to 2014.

Campbell Live cameraman Grant Findlay won a 2016 Gold Award for Cinematography at the inaugural NZCS (New Zealand Cinematographers Society) Awards for "One night with a St John crew" – story with Ali Ikram, edited by Sarah Rowan; Campbell Live Series 10: Episode 47 – 'News and Current Affairs' category.

== Controversy ==
=== Broadcasting standards breaches ===
During the show's ten-year run, the Broadcasting Standards Authority (BSA) received numerous complaints about Campbell Live, eleven of which were upheld with formal orders issued against the broadcaster.

In April 2007, the BSA upheld a complaint by the Children's Commissioner, Dr Cindy Kiro, against Campbell Live over a 19 July 2006 item discussing the proposed repeal of section 59 of the Crimes Act. The segment featured an interview with a 14-year-old boy, who had been removed from his mother’s care by child protection authorities, conducted in her presence and without the knowledge or consent of his legal guardian, CYFS. The BSA found that the boy was unfairly exploited given his vulnerability and the circumstances surrounding the interview. While the Authority declined to determine the privacy complaint and did not uphold concerns about balance or accuracy, it ruled that the boy was treated unfairly in breach of broadcasting standards. TV3 was ordered to broadcast a statement and pay $1,500 in costs to the Crown.

In June 2007, the BSA upheld a complaint against Campbell Live over a 24 October 2006 segment alleging that a Fijian island used for filming Treasure Island had been left “trashed” by the production. The BSA found that the broadcast inaccurately suggested Eyeworks Touchdown, the production company, was responsible for the rubbish, without providing evidence to support the claim. The programme was also found to have treated the company unfairly by failing to adequately present its explanation or give a reasonable opportunity to respond. The Authority ordered TV3 to broadcast a statement summarising the upheld aspects of the decision during Campbell Live.

In October 2008, the BSA upheld a complaint against Campbell Live after it aired what appeared to be an interview with one of the so-called "medal thieves" involved in the Waiouru Army Museum burglary. Although the programme disclosed that a false name and an actor’s voice were used, it did not make clear that the figure shown on screen was also an actor reenacting a previously conducted interview. The BSA found that this misled viewers and breached the accuracy standard. It ruled that the broadcaster failed to correct the error in the same medium and within a reasonable timeframe, and ordered TV3 to broadcast a statement summarising the decision during Campbell Live.

In October 2009, the BSA upheld a complaint by Gary and Julie Riddell against Campbell Live for breaching accuracy and fairness standards in a February 2009 broadcast about their cattle grazing practices along the Pāhaoa River. The segment, which featured critical commentary from neighbours, environmental experts, and officials, failed to give the Riddells a reasonable opportunity to respond, relying instead on a last-minute “door-stepping” attempt. The BSA found that the reporter’s approach was unfair and that the programme inaccurately claimed the Riddells had been ordered to move cattle and clean up a rubbish dump—neither of which had occurred. It ruled that the broadcast unfairly harmed their reputation and ordered TVWorks to air a summary of the decision and pay $1,670 in legal costs.

In March 2011, the BSA upheld a complaint against Campbell Live for unfairly portraying businessman Tony Katavich as a criminal and internet fraudster in broadcasts aired on 4 and 5 March 2010. The programme, which investigated Katavich’s online businesses selling job and adoption information packs, included customer allegations of being “ripped off” and described him as the “face of a faceless crime.” The BSA found that the broadcasts created an unjustified impression of criminal conduct without sufficient evidence, although complaints regarding privacy and accuracy were not upheld. TV3 was ordered to pay $2,000 in costs to the complainant.

In July 2011, the BSA upheld a complaint over a Campbell Live segment on striking workers at recycling company Paper Reclaim, aired in July 2010. The Authority found breaches of accuracy and fairness, ruling that the programme misrepresented the company’s premises as rat-infested and unsanitary through exaggerated imagery and unverified claims. A promotional clip was also found to have misled viewers. TV3 was ordered to broadcast a summary of the decision, pay $13,742.20 in legal costs to the complainant, and $3,000 to the Crown.

In May 2012, the BSA upheld a complaint against Campbell Live, 3 News, and The Jono Project over the use of hidden-camera footage of a shop owner during a segment on public reactions to women wearing burqas. Originally broadcast on Campbell Live, the footage was reused in other programmes where the woman was mocked and labeled a “racist.” The Authority found that the woman was not given the opportunity to respond and was unfairly and unjustifiably portrayed. TVWorks was ordered to pay $2,000 to the Crown.

In June 2012, the BSA upheld a complaint over a 2011 Campbell Live broadcast about alleged methamphetamine contamination in a rental property. The Authority found the programme breached standards of accuracy and fairness by overstating contamination levels, referring to the entire house rather than just the garage, and omitting key evidence from testing agencies. The landlord, Mr Chaobin Wang, was unfairly portrayed as negligent. The BSA awarded him $1,400 in legal costs.

In July 2012, the BSA upheld a complaint over a 2011 broadcast involving a dispute between a grieving mother and Whanganui baby retailer Baby Solutions. The Authority found that Campbell Live breached standards of privacy, fairness, and accuracy by filming the co-owners without consent, airing confidential financial details, and omitting context about their lack of legal obligation to offer a refund. TVWorks was ordered to pay the complainants $500 for breach of privacy and $750 in legal costs.

In February 2015, the BSA upheld a complaint by Margaret Harkema, former director of the Valley Animal Research Centre (VARC), over five Campbell Live broadcasts aired in late 2011. The programme alleged Harkema was rehoming beagles used in animal testing via TradeMe under false pretenses. The BSA found breaches of fairness, accuracy, and privacy, citing misleading presentation, covert filming, and door-stepping. TVWorks was ordered to pay $2,000 in compensation and $12,000 in legal costs.

In July 2015, the BSA upheld a complaint against Campbell Live for breaching balance and accuracy standards in a 4 September 2014 broadcast marking the fourth anniversary of the Canterbury earthquake. The programme featured a live audience of residents with unresolved insurance claims but excluded perspectives from the insurance industry, despite multiple offers by the Insurance Council of New Zealand (ICNZ) to participate. The BSA found that this misled viewers and failed to meet standards for fair and balanced reporting. The broadcaster was ordered to air a statement summarising the decision.

== Notable staff ==
- John Campbell – presenter/correspondent reporter
- Carol Hirschfeld – Head of the show
- Pip Keane – Executive Producer (2009 – 29 May 2015)
- Billy Weepu – former camera operator
- Anna Burns-Francis - Journalist
- Dan Parker - Journalist
