= Kamahl Santamaria =

New Zealand journalist (born 1980)

Kamahl S. Santamaria
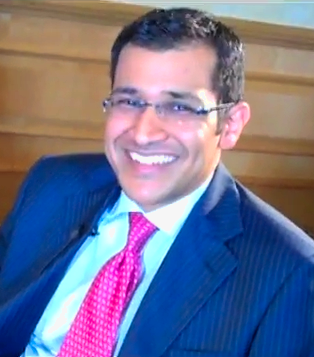
- Santamaria preparing for an interview in 2011.
- Born: 14 February 1980 (age 46); Auckland, New Zealand
- Occupations: Journalist, news anchor
- Years active: 1998–2022
- Presenting career
- Station: TVNZ (2022) Al Jazeera English (2005–2022) Sky News Australia (2002–2004) TV3 New Zealand (1998–2001)
- Previous shows: newsgrid; Counting the Cost; Sky Business Report with David Koch
- Website: kamahlsantamaria.com

Kamahl Santamaria is a New Zealand television journalist who achieved international prominence as an anchor for Al Jazeera between 2005 and 2022. In April 2022, he joined the hosting team of Breakfast, on New Zealand's TVNZ 1, but resigned abruptly after a brief period on air. Allegations of inappropriate behaviour towards female employees subsequently emerged.

== Early life ==
Santamaria was born and raised in Auckland, New Zealand. His parents were born in Aden, Yemen; his father's family originates from Goa, India. He is one of two children.

He received his secondary education at Macleans College, where he was in Kupe House. In 1997, he was appointed House Captain. The same year he served as a Youth MP for Maurice Williamson.

== Career ==
=== TV3 (New Zealand) ===
Santamaria began his journalistic career straight out of high school in 1998, as a news and sports reporter for TV3 in New Zealand. He also moved up to producing nightly sports bulletins, under the influence of veteran New Zealand journalists Tony Ciprian and Angus Gilles.

At the end of his time at TV3 in late 2001, Santamaria was selected to cover the Atlantic Rowing Race. He was on his way to Barbados – where the event was due to finish – when he was grounded at New York's JFK Airport following the American Airlines Flight 587 crash in Queens, New York. In the event, this made him the only reporter from New Zealand or Australia to be able to cover the disaster on the ground.

Santamaria has remained visible in New Zealand media in recent years, with regular radio slots on RadioLive, NewstalkZB, and RNZ, and articles for The Spinoff. In 2019 and 2020, he was a judge for New Zealand's Voyager Media Awards.

=== Sky News (Australia) ===
After three years working on TV3's flagship nightly news show 3 News, Santamaria moved to Australia where he established and ran Sky News Australia's Melbourne business bureau, from the Docklands Broadcast Centre of Channel Seven Melbourne.

He was a reporter, presenter and producer on the nightly Sky Business Report with David Koch.

=== Al Jazeera English (Qatar) ===
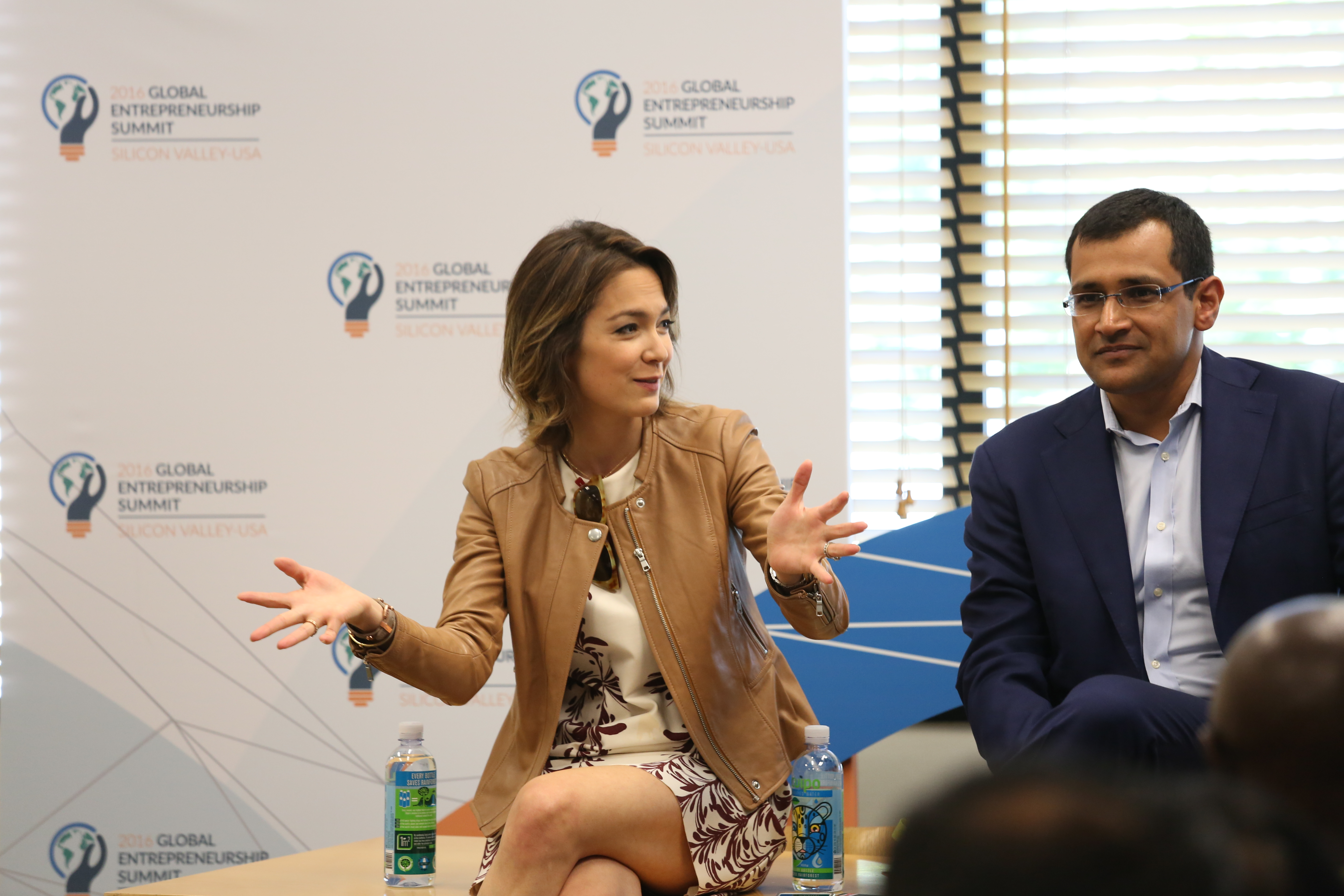
Kamahl, and Bloomberg's Emily Chang hosting a session at the Global Entrepreneurship Summit 2016, Palo Alto

In 2004, Santamaria moved to New York and London, and in 2005 was recruited by Al Jazeera English to become a news presenter in Doha, Qatar.

Over 16 years, he fronted news and current affairs across the channel – news bulletins, the Newshour, discussion show Inside Story – and between September 2009 and November 2016 was the regular host of the weekly business and economics programme Counting the Cost.

He was also the primary presenter of Al Jazeera's interactive newshour newsgrid which ran between November 2016 and March 2019. The show was nominated for an International Emmy Award in October 2018.

As a reporter and field anchor, Santamaria also reported for Al Jazeera from Zimbabwe, South Africa, Germany, Dubai, France, the United States, the Philippines and the World Economic Forum in Davos.

He was the electoral "number cruncher" for the U.S. Presidential Elections in 2008, 2012, 2016, and 2020 and in January 2021, went on to anchor Al Jazeera's U.S. presidential inauguration coverage from Washington DC.

On 17 March 2022, Santamaria announced on-air that he was leaving Al Jazeera after 16 and a half years.

=== TVNZ (New Zealand) ===
Santamaria returned to New Zealand in March 2022, joining TVNZ (Television New Zealand) to present the network's Breakfast programme from April 2022, replacing John Campbell. His last appearance on screen was on 18 May 2022. A subsequently discredited announcement was made on 28 May 2022 that he had resigned for "family reasons" and would be leaving effective immediately, only a month into his time on the show. It was later reported that he had resigned after a female staff member at TVNZ had complained about "inappropriate behaviour" from him. It was also reported that complaints of a similar nature had been made against him during his time at Al Jazeera, raising concerns about the hiring process TVNZ had followed.

Following an investigation into the hiring process, Paul Yurisich, who had worked with Santamaria at Al Jazeera and had hired him at TVNZ, stepped down from his role as head of news and current affairs at TVNZ. In mid October 2022, Santamaria issued a public apology on the current affairs blog The Daily Blog, stating "that what he believed to be "a bit of banter" and flirtatious behaviour was not appropriate." In addition, Santamaria claimed that some of the allegations leveled against him over the past four months lacked context, were lies, or amounted to a "rewriting" of history.

On 27 November 2023 Santamaria announced that he would be selling his house to fund legal action against TVNZ.
