= Alison Mau =

Journalist in Australia and New Zealand

- Born: 14 February 1965 (age 61); Melbourne, Victoria, Australia
- Other name: Ali Mau
- Occupation: Journalist
- Employer: Stuff
- Organization(s): The Sunday Star-Times, Stuff
- Known for: The #metoonz project
- Spouse(s): Simon Dallow (m. 1996 div. 2009); Karleen Edmonds (eng. 2012)
- Children: 2

Alison Mau (/mɔː/) (born 14 February 1965), known professionally as Ali Mau, is an Australian-born New Zealand journalist and broadcaster. She is a former television news anchor, former co-host of the TVNZ current affairs show Seven Sharp, former co-presenter of the consumer affairs show Fair Go, and former co-host of TVNZ Breakfast programme. Mau is a former talkback radio host on RadioLIVE, a nationwide Auckland-based New Zealand talkback, news and sport radio network owned and operated by MediaWorks New Zealand.

Mau is currently an Op-ed columnist at The Sunday Star-Times weekend newspaper, and a contributor on the Stuff news website.

Mau currently leads a team of journalists at Stuff in the recently launched 2018 national #metoonz investigation into sexual harassment in New Zealand, supported by Stuff. The #metoonz project - which references the celebrity #metoo social movement - is for people who wanted to have a voice but didn't know where to go. Editorial Director Mark Stevens said a team of journalists would help investigate the potential stories that emerged, and journalists Cecile Meier and Michelle Duff will work closely with Mau. Mau confirmed to Radio New Zealand Mediawatch that she will respond to every person who gets in touch before any individual's stories are passed on to journalists.

== Early life ==
Mau was born in Melbourne in 1965 to D'arcy Lee Mau, a journalist and Maureen Prosser Mau. Her parent's met in Prosser's native England. Mau has an older sister and a younger sister.

== Career ==
Mau's first reporting job was for the Warracknabeal Herald in northern Victoria at age 18. In 1984 she was hired by the Melbourne Herald. She moved to London in 1990 and presented and reported for World Business Report on BBC World. She returned to Australia in 1993 but moved to New Zealand soon after, where she was soon employed by TVNZ.

Her first television appearance was on the business-related current affairs show Made in New Zealand. Mau would later present late-night current affairs programming including Eyewitness and Newsnight, the latter of which she presented alongside Marcus Lush and her future husband Simon Dallow.

After a period reporting for ONE News, Mau began presenting the Breakfast programme with Mike Hosking. She returned to ONE News after the birth of her second child and, from 1999 to 2003, presented the weekend news alongside husband Simon Dallow. She returned to Breakfast in 2004 but left at the end of the year to join rival network Prime Television, where she worked with former TVNZ presenter Paul Holmes. She was made redundant from Prime when the station was taken over by Sky in early 2006 and returned to TVNZ in 2008.

Upon her return to TVNZ, Mau worked as a back-up host for Breakfast and also appeared in other news, non-news, and current affairs shows including the home and lifestyle show Home Front, which she presented alongside future Dunedin mayor Dave Cull. In 2010, she became co-host of weekly consumer affairs programme Fair Go.

In 2013, she moved to co-host the nightly current affairs programme Seven Sharp; in an interview given shortly after she left that programme, Mau stated that when she was recruited for Seven Sharp, the programme pitched to her was quite different from the one that eventuated. She also said that had she known what the show would be like, she "never would have left the job at Fair Go".

In 2014, Mau commenced a radio talkback host career at RadioLIVE. She began the four-year gig at talkback station RadioLIVE, initially in an early afternoon co-host slot with Willie Jackson. She then moved to host the daily RadioLive Drive radio show. During her time with RadioLIVE, Mau also contributed as a fill-in host on 2014's The Paul Henry Show on TV3, which was simulcast on RadioLIVE and across multi-media platforms.

In December 2017, Mau announced her departure from her daily RadioLIVE Drive radio show in February 2018. Mau said she had been "incredibly fortunate" to spend four years at the station learning the radio business. "Having spent my early career in print journalism – then more than 20 years in television – radio was a new frontier for me. I leave with a store of cross-platform skills I could only have dreamed of back then," Mau said. She would not be drawn on her plans for 2018, saying "it's a bit too early to make those details public".

Mau is currently an Op-ed columnist at The Sunday Star-Times weekend newspaper, and she is contributor on the Stuff.co.nz news portal website, published by Fairfax Digital, a division of Fairfax New Zealand Ltd.

Mau currently leads a team of journalists at Stuff investigating sexual harassment in New Zealand. Mau launched the 2018 national #metoonz investigation into sexual harassment, supported by Stuff. She says it is an opportunity for Kiwis - mainly women, but men too - to bring their tormentors to account. The #metoonz project - which references the celebrity #metoo social movement - is for people who wanted to have a voice but didn't know where to go. She felt the size of New Zealand had held back the #metoo movement, with women and men reluctant to speak out for fear of losing their jobs or their careers in our smaller industries. Stuff's Editorial Director Mark Stevens said a team of journalists would help investigate the potential stories that emerged, and journalists Cecile Meier and Michelle Duff will work closely with Ms Mau. Mau confirmed to Radio New Zealand Mediawatch that she will respond to every person who gets in touch before any individual's stories are passed on to journalists.

== Personal life ==
Mau met Simon Dallow on a Contiki Tours tour in Europe in 1989. The pair first worked together at TVNZ in 1994 and married in 1996. The couple divorced in 2009. They have two children. In 2010, following rumours of a same-sex relationship, she stated publicly that she is bisexual. She became engaged to Karleen Edmonds in February 2012.

== Publications ==
- First Lady: From Boyhood to Womanhood: The Incredible Story of New Zealand's Sex-change Pioneer Liz Roberts, Upstart Press Ltd, Bookwire GmbH, London, 2015,
- No Words for This, 2025,

== See also ==
- List of New Zealand television personalities
