= Anna Burns-Francis =

New Zealand television presenter

- Born: 1985 or 1986 (age 39–40)
- Citizenship: New Zealand
- Television: Fair Go; 1News; Breakfast

Anna Burns-Francis (1985 or 1986) is a New Zealand television presenter and journalist who has worked for Fair Go, 1News and Breakfast. She currently lives in Doha working for Al Jazeera English news Channel .

== Career ==
Burns-Francis began working for TVNZ in 2016. In April 2020 Burns-Francis left Fair Go to become 1News's United States correspondent, replacing Jack Tame. She was based in New York. During this time she covered the COVID-19 pandemic, the 2020 United States presidential election and the January 6 United States Capitol attack. After returning to New Zealand, Burns-Francis and Chris Chang became co-hosts of the morning news programme Breakfast in January 2023, joining Jenny-May Clarkson and Matty McLean. In December 2024, during a TVNZ cost-saving restructure, Burns-Francis was told that she would have to re-apply for her job to remain at the company. She decided not to re-apply, and soon moved to Dubai for her husband's job.

== Personal life ==
In 2022 Burns-Francis became engaged with Simon Gordon in New York after Gordon proposed to her in a helicopter. They were married in Wellington in 2023 and had a daughter in May 2024.
