= Tony Ciprian =

New Zealand broadcaster (1932–2015)

Antony Ciprian (10 November 1932 – 13 January 2015) was a New Zealand broadcaster, best known as a television sports news presenter and producer.

== Biography ==
Born in 1932, Ciprian spent 10 years as a police officer before joining the New Zealand Broadcasting Corporation as a journalist at Gisborne radio station 2ZG. While mainly engaged in reporting for radio, he also filed the occasional report for television. In 1971, he took a six-month sabbatical from 2ZG to study radio and television news techniques in Australia.

In the 1980s, Ciprian joined TVNZ as a sports news reader and reporter on the evening news bulletin, and was part of the team that covered the 1986 Commonwealth Games in Edinburgh. In 1989 he moved to the newly established TV3 as that channel's first sports producer, and remained in that role for the next 20 years, apart from a couple of interruptions. He was a mentor to many younger reporters, including Kamahl Santamaria.

In retirement, Ciprian lived in Queensland, Australia. He died at Hervey Bay on 13 January 2015, at the age of 82.
