= Ned Barry =

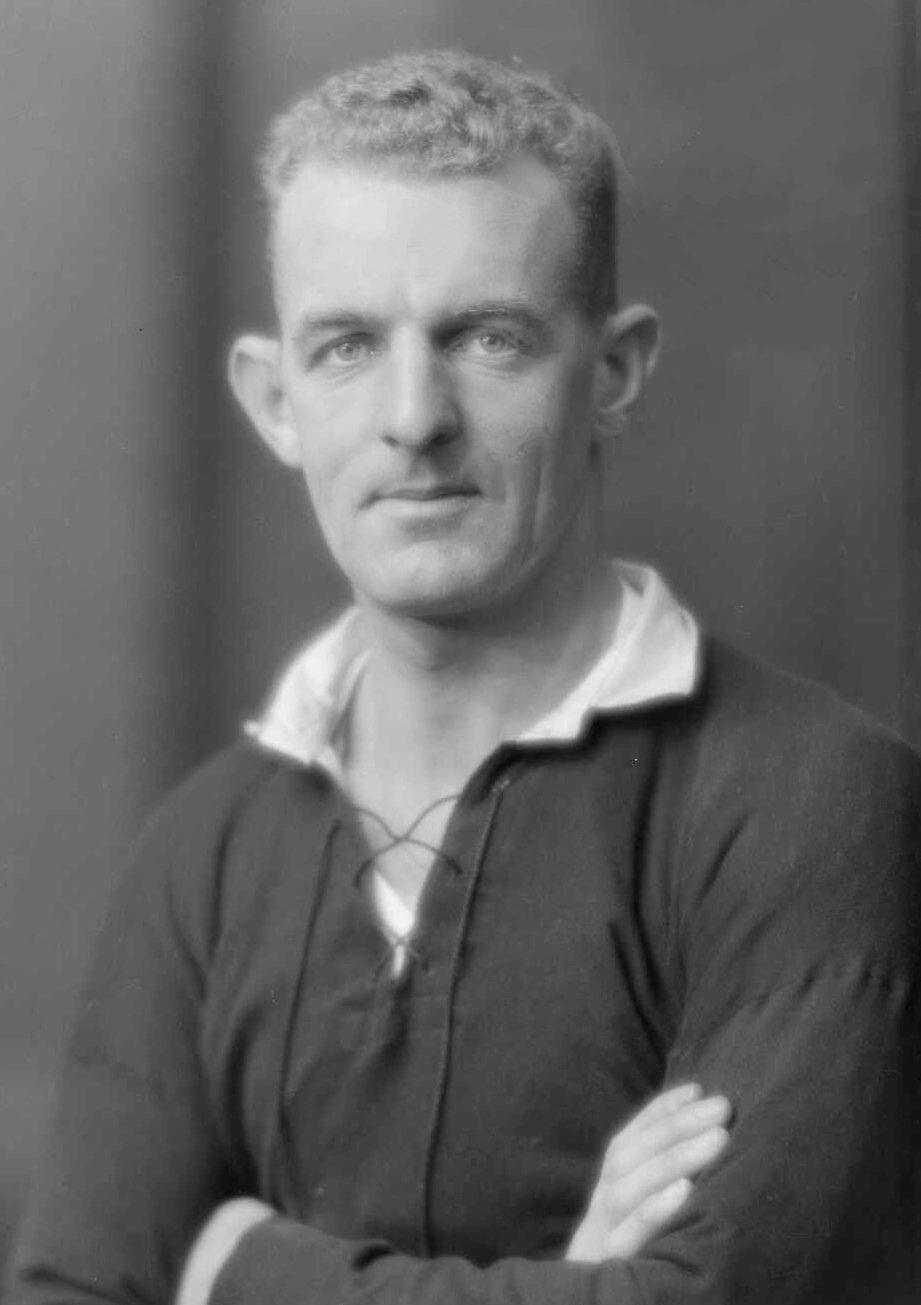
- Born: Edward Fitzgerald Barry; 3 September 1905 Temuka, New Zealand
- Died: 12 December 1993 (aged 88) Auckland, New Zealand
- Height: 1.88 m (6 ft 2 in)
- Weight: 91 kg (201 lb)
- School: Pleasant Point District High School
- Notable relative(s): Kevin Barry (son); Liam Barry (grandson)
- Occupation: Police officer

Rugby union career
- Position: Loose forward
Provincial / State sides
Years	Team	Apps	(Points)
1926–36	Wellington		
1940	Wanganui	1	
International career
Years	Team	Apps	(Points)
1932, 1934	New Zealand	1	(0)

Edward Fitzgerald Barry (3 September 1905 – 12 December 1993) was a New Zealand rugby union player. A loose forward, Barry represented Wellington and, briefly, Wanganui at a provincial level, and was a member of the New Zealand national side, the All Blacks, in 1932 and 1934. He played 10 matches for the All Blacks including one international, against Australia in 1934.

A police officer, Barry had postings in Pahiatua, Whitianga, Orewa, and Auckland, where he was active as a coach and administrator at club and provincial union levels.

He holds a unique place in New Zealand rugby history in that both his son, Kevin Barry, and grandson, Liam Barry, also played for the All Blacks: in doing so they became the first family to provide All Blacks from three successive generations. He also had another son, Pat, who played for Counties in the 1960s, and another grandson, Mike Barry, who represented North Auckland and North Harbour.
