= Emma Richmond =

- Occupation: Novelist
- Writing career
- Pen name: Emma Richmond
- Period: 1988–2001
- Genre: Romantic novel

Emma Richmond was a popular writer of 33 romance novels in Mills & Boon from 1988 to 2001.

== Bibliography ==
=== Single novels ===
- Take Away the Pride (1988)
- Unwilling Heart (1989)
- Heart in Hiding (1989)
- Suspicious Heart (1989)
- Gentle Trap (1990)
- A Taste of Heaven (1990)
- Law of Possession (1990)
- A Foolish Dream (1991)
- Unfair Assumptions (1991)
- A Stranger's Trust (1991)
- Deliberate Provocation (1992)
- More Than a Dream (1992)
- Fate of Happiness (1992)
- Love of My Heart (1993)
- Fiery Attraction (1993)
- A Wayward Love (1994)
- A Family Closeness (1995)
- The Love Trap (1995)
- The Bachelor Chase (1996)
- Having It All! (1996)
- First-time Father (1996)
- Behaving Badly! (1997)
- Secret Wedding (1997)
- A Husband for Christmas (1997)
- His Temporary Mistress (1997)
- Instant Mother (1998)
- One Bride Required! (1998)
- Bridegroom on Loan (1999)
- The Reluctant Groom (1999)
- The Boss's Bride (1999)
- Marriage for Real (2000)
- The Reluctant Tycoon (2000)
- Marriage Potential (2001)

=== Omnibus in collaboration ===
- Christmas Journeys (1995) (with Catherine George, Kay Gregory and Lynsey Stevens) (Yule Tide, Man to Live For, Mistletoe Kisses, Christmas Charade)

== References and sources ==
- Harlequin Enterprises Ltd's Website
