= Warracknabeal Herald =

The Warracknabeal Herald is a newspaper published in Warracknabeal, Victoria, Australia.

== History ==
The Warracknabeal Herald has been published under that title since 1902. It had previously been published as:

- Northern Argus
- Warracknabeal herald and Wimmera district advocate
