= New Zealand Broadcasting School =

- Te Kura Pāpaho o Aotearoa
- P block on Ara Institute of Canterbury's Madras Street campus, where the school is based
- Type: Tertiary broadcasting school
- Established: 1983
- Parent institution: Ara Institute of Canterbury
- Location: 33 Southwark Street, Christchurch, New Zealand; 43.5372°S 172.6416°E
- Campus: Urban
- Website: nzbs.com

The New Zealand Broadcasting School (NZBS) is a Christchurch-based tertiary education facility for journalism, radio, and screen production. It is part of the Ara Institute of Canterbury.

== Programme ==
In three years of study, the first two being on-campus learning and the third being a 24-week paid professional internship, students can acquire one of the following three degrees:

- Bachelor of Broadcasting Communications (Journalism)
- Bachelor of Broadcasting Communications (Radio, Audio and Entertainment)
- Bachelor of Broadcasting Communications (Screen Production)

At its peak, 75 first year students were enrolled across the three degrees, requiring a rigorous selection process. Since 2022, the difficulty to enrol has decreased due to fewer applicants, cited as "consistent with the current labour market trend".

== History ==
The school was founded by Dr. Brian Pauling (ONZM) in 1983, initially beginning as a small community course. He headed NZBS until 2001, and left in 2015.

According to Ara, as of 2021 there have been over 1,400 graduates of the broadcasting communications degree since it began.

== Notable alumni ==
- Ben Boyce – television and radio personality
- Kris Faafoi – former television journalist and Labour Party politician
- Clarke Gayford – television and radio broadcaster, husband of Jacinda Ardern
- Miriama Kamo – journalist and television presenter
- Mike McRoberts – television journalist and news anchor
- Jack Tame – television and radio journalist and presenter

== Independent review ==
In November 2021, following allegations from former students of bullying, harassment, and sexist and racist comments at the school, Ara's acting chief executive initiated an independent investigation led by Richard Raymond KC, covering February 2019 to October 2021. 51 current and former students and staff were interviewed.

The report found widespread bullying and accepted accounts of sexual harassment by students against other students, and found a large volume of evidence of sexist, racist and inappropriate comments, mostly made by students. It found no evidence of bullying or harassment by tutors, but concluded that a small minority of tutors had enabled such behaviour. It also described heavy drinking around student initiation events and raised concerns about student mental health, with many students feeling that the course induced high levels of stress, as they were pressured to work seven day weeks with very long hours. In response, many students reported they were told that "this is how it is in the industry".

Ara said it accepted the report in its entirety and would implement its recommendations.
