= Tova O'Brien =

New Zealand political journalist

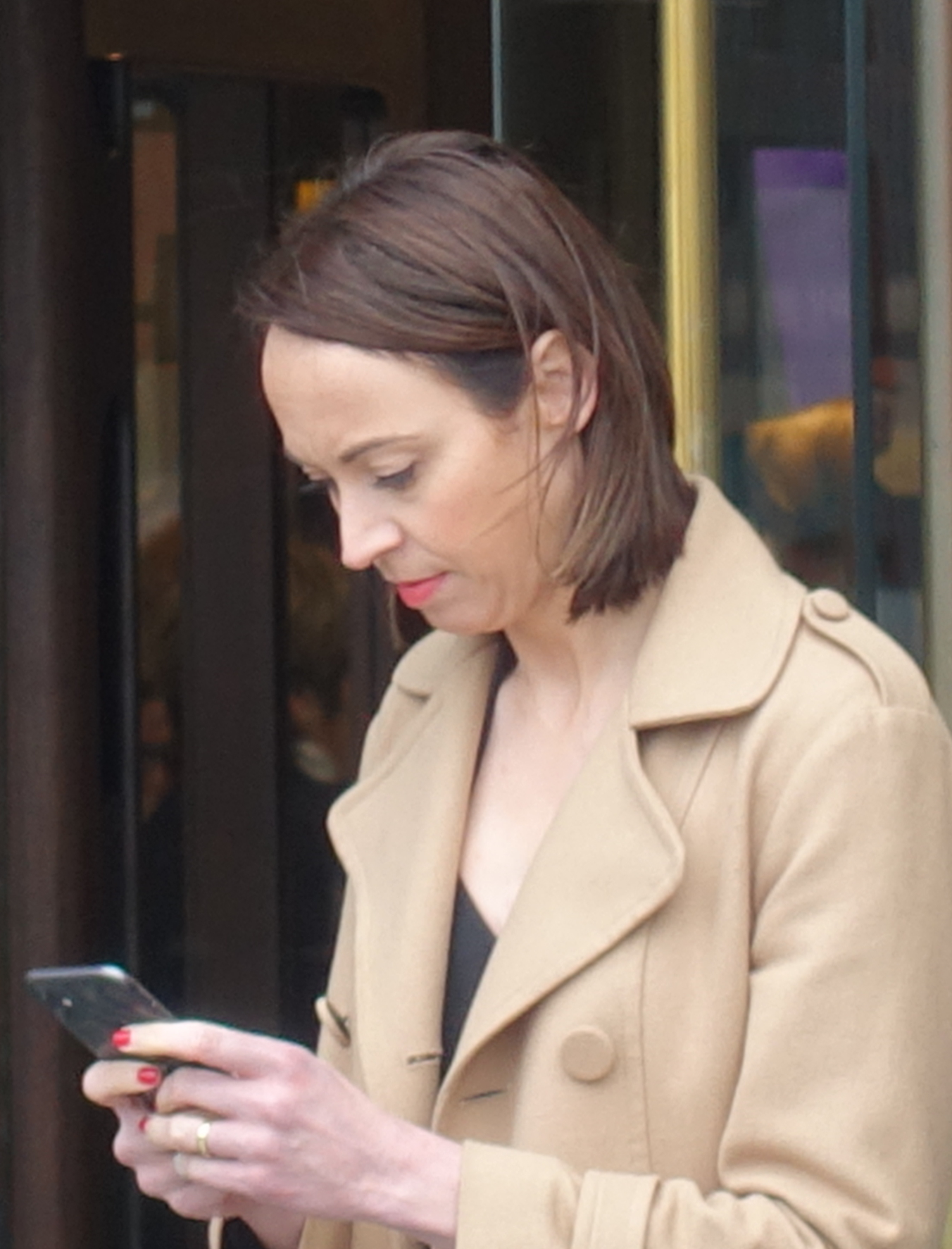
- O'Brien in 2020
- Born: 1982 or 1983 (age 43–44); Papua New Guinea
- Occupations: Political journalist and broadcaster

Tova O'Brien (born 1982 or 1983) is a New Zealand political journalist and broadcaster.

She is currently a presenter on TVNZ's early morning show Breakfast. She previously served as the chief political correspondent for Stuff Digital, having previously worked for Newshub and the now-defunct Today FM.

== Early life and education ==
O’Brien was born in Papua New Guinea. Her mother, a British journalist, and her father, a New Zealand helicopter pilot, had met while working in the country. When O'Brien was six months old, the family moved to New Zealand. Her parents separated when she was three and O'Brien was raised by her mother in Wellington.

After high school, she started a degree at the University of Otago in film and psychology. She did not complete the degree, instead going overseas to work in Melbourne and London in hospitality. In 2006 she decided to train as a journalist and completed a qualification at Massey University.

== Career ==
O'Brien's first journalism role after graduating was at Radio Active in Wellington before joining MediaWorks New Zealand in 2007, firstly on the assignments desk, before moving into reporting for the breakfast and late-night news programmes.

In 2016 she was assigned the role of European correspondent for Newshub, the news division of MediaWorks. In 2018, she returned to Wellington and became Newshub's political editor, succeeding Patrick Gower. Her style of journalism, according to Gower, is "edgy", and she attracts a lot of criticism due to her high profile.

In October 2020, O'Brien's interview with Jami-Lee Ross, co-leader of the Advance New Zealand party, garnered 7 million views. She was internationally praised by journalists for preventing Ross from mentioning conspiracy theories about the COVID-19 pandemic during the interview.

In November 2021, Mediaworks, O’Brien’s former employer, rehired her to host the breakfast radio show on new talk station Today FM.

She left Discovery and her role at Newshub in January 2022, prior to the launch of Today FM, which launched on 21 March 2022.

O'Brien had appealed against a restraint of trade clause in her Discovery contract, which prevented her from joining Mediaworks for three months. But the Employment Relations Authority rejected her case and ordered O'Brien to pay $2,000 for breaching her employment agreement.

On 30 March 2023, Today FM ceased broadcasting, shortly after O'Brien interrupted the mid-morning Duncan Garner Today show to announce the station's closure, with O'Brien quipping "They have fucked us."

O'Brien and Garner, who had addressed the station's future during the 'Tova' breakfast show, continued to criticise station owners Mediaworks until the show was abruptly taken off air and replaced by automated music. The station's closure was confirmed later that day.

On 19 July 2023, it was announced that O'Brien would be joining New Zealand news publishing firm Stuff Digital as its chief political correspondent.

On 12 August 2023, after an article written by O'Brien about the National Party's election strategy was published, National Party MP Chris Penk made an online comment "Sorry but your poor ratings crashed an entire radio station." Christopher Luxon said the comment was "insensitive and inappropriate" because many people lost their jobs when Today FM closed. Penk apologised for the comment.

On 15 December 2025, TVNZ announced that O'Brien would join the broadcaster's early morning show Breakfast in April 2026.

== Recognition ==
In 2019, O'Brien won the award for Political Journalist of the Year at the Voyager Media Awards. The citation read:

Courageous, tenacious, O'Brien wielded considerable influence on the 2018 political scene with her scoops, as a good member of the fourth estate should. She leads from the lip and is not put off by those who would have her silenced. A true political muckraker.

At the 2021 New Zealand Television Awards O'Brien was awarded Best Presenter: News and Current Affairs for Newshub Nation.

O'Brien went on to win the award for Broadcast Reporter of the Year – News at the Voyager Media Awards for two consecutive years, in 2022 and 2023, and was part of the team that won for Best News Story – Team Coverage, at the 2023 Radio Awards for reporting on the war in Ukraine.

== Personal life ==
O'Brien married TV editor and Beastwars drummer Nathan "Nato" Hickey in 2016 in London; they had known each other since 2006 from Wellington.

She announced in August 2024 that she was expecting a child with her new partner, camera operator Cam Williams. O'Brien gave birth to a baby girl on 10 October 2024, 10 weeks early.
