= Kay Gregory =

New Zealand broadcaster

Hamilton City Councillor
- In office 2007–2010

Personal details
- Occupation: Journalist, celebrant

Kay Gregory is a journalist and former presenter at TVNZ (Television New Zealand). She previously hosted the Breakfast show with Paul Henry.

== Career ==
Gregory began her television career in 1994, when she became a newsreader and current affairs host for the regional channel, Coast to Coast, in her home city of Hamilton. She started at TVNZ in 1996, and was a reporter for the Breakfast programme when it first went to air in 1997. She then became a reporter for ONE News, and her stint there included some overseas work in the Solomon Islands and Fiji. From 2002 to 2004, Gregory was a full-time weather presenter for TV One. Then on 17 January 2005, she replaced Alison Mau as the co-host of Breakfast.

After leaving Breakfast (on 3 August 2007), Gregory moved into local body politics and was elected as a councillor for Hamilton West. Gregory was the highest-polling councillor, with 11,808 votes. She did not stand again in the 2010 election.

In addition to her work at TVNZ, Gregory is a marriage and funeral celebrant, and a member of International Training and Communication.

== See also ==
- List of New Zealand television personalities
