= Daniel Faitaua =

New Zealand television news reporter

- Born: 11 May 1976 (age 48); Christchurch, New Zealand
- Education: University of Canterbury
- Occupations: Reporter; Anchor
- Employer: TVNZ
- Television: Close Up; Back Benches; 1News
- Website: tvnz.co.nz/close-up/daniel-faitaua-2369247

Daniel Faitaua (born 11 May 1976) is a New Zealand television news reporter of Samoan descent. He was the 1News Europe correspondent, based in London, from 2019 to 2022 and was previously newsreader on Breakfast and 1 News at Midday. In 2024 Faitaua returned to Breakfast replacing Matty McLean until he left again in February 2025 then he moved to Seven Sharp for being a reporter and producer.

== Early and personal life ==
Faitaua was born in Christchurch, where he attended Catholic Cathedral College, later graduating from the University of Canterbury before studying at the New Zealand Broadcasting School at CPIT (now Ara Institute of Canterbury), from which he graduated in 2009.

He is married, with three children.

== Journalism and broadcast career ==
He worked as a reporter on TVNZ's Close Up for three years, and also served as a backup host on political talk show Back Benches before moving to the network's main news programme. In 2024, Faitaua will return to Breakfast as a presenter.

Faitaua was involved in a support campaign for people suffering stress after the 2011 Christchurch earthquake, Address The Stress.

== See also ==
- List of New Zealand television personalities
