= Jenny-May Clarkson =

New Zealand netball player and sports commentator

Personal information
- Born: 9 April 1974 (age 52) Te Kūiti, New Zealand
- Height: 1.70 m (5 ft 7 in)
- Spouse: Dean Clarkson

Netball career
- Playing positions: WA, C
Years	Club team	Apps
1997	Waikato Wildcats	
1998–2004	Waikato Bay of Plenty Magic	
2007	Auckland Diamonds	
2008	Southern Steel	
2010	Northern Mystics	
Years	National team	Caps
1997–2002	New Zealand	26
Medal record
Representing New Zealand
Commonwealth Games
Silver medal – second place	2002 Manchester	Team
- Updated on 18 October 2009

Jenny-May Clarkson (née Coffin; 9 April 1974) is a New Zealand television presenter, Former New Zealand netball player and former co-host of Breakfast.

Clarkson was a member of the Silver Ferns, the New Zealand national netball team, from 1997 to 2002, and was the vice-captain in 2001. She also played for the Waikato Bay of Plenty Magic in the National Bank Cup (1998–2004) and the Auckland Diamonds (2007); she also played one season in the ANZ Championship in 2008 for the Southern Steel, and was signed to play with the Northern Mystics in 2010.

Since 2005, Clarkson has been a sports commentator and news presenter for TVNZ and Māori Television. From 2020 to 2025, She was a co-host of TVNZ's Breakfast

== Early life ==
Jenny-May Clarkson was born in Te Kūiti, New Zealand. She was the youngest of six children raised by Waka and Paddy Coffin in Piopio, close to Mokaukohunui marae. Her father's parents were Charlie Coffin, a Pākehā, and Harata, a Māori.

== International netball ==
Jenny-May Clarkson played for the Silver Ferns from 1997 to 2002. She was vice-captain in 2001, and represented the Silver Ferns at the 2002 Commonwealth Games. She made 26 caps for the Ferns before retiring from international netball at the end of 2002.

== Domestic netball ==
Jenny-May Clarkson played in New Zealand domestic netball leagues since 1995 and the National Bank Cup since 1998. She started playing for the Waikato Bay of Plenty Magic in 1998 and in 2000 was appointed captain. She left the Magic in 2004, going into retirement and worked as a sports presenter on TVNZ. She returned to netball in 2006 and played in the National Championships before playing in the Auckland Diamonds as captain in 2007. With the National Bank Cup replaced by the ANZ Championship in 2008, Coffin was signed with the Southern Steel on a two-year contract. However, she pulled out of the team after the first season to focus on her television career. Coffin announced her return to competitive netball in October 2009, signing with the Northern Mystics for the 2010 ANZ Championship season.

== Broadcasting ==
Clarkson first joined TVNZ in 2005 as the netball commentator for the National Bank Cup on ONE Sport. In March of that year she was announced as the weekend sports presenter and sports producer during the weekdays. In 2006, she regained her role on ONE Sport and she rejoined the netball commentating team. In 2007, she played for the Auckland Diamonds netball team. She presented sport on TV One on Mondays and Tuesdays, and commentated some National Bank Cup games. She was a news presenter on TVNZ 7 before TVNZ dropped the station.

Clarkson replaced Daniel Faitaua as the news presenter on Breakfast on TVNZ 1 in September 2019. In August 2020 she succeeded Hayley Holt as co-presenter, alongside John Campbell.

In November 2025, TVNZ announced that Clarkson would be leaving her role on Breakfast later that month after the company announced a "refresh". On 21 November 2025, Clarkson co-hosted her final show.

== Controversy ==
In April 2018 after the Silver Ferns failed to qualify for a medal at the Commonwealth Games, Clarkson's question about whether the team had pride in the black dress, asked of captain Katrina Rore, was criticised as being too harsh.

== Personal life ==
Clarkson married Dean Clarkson in 2015; the couple had twin sons in 2016.

== See also ==
- List of New Zealand television personalities
