= Fair Go =

- Genre: Business, Talk Show
- Created by: Brian Edwards
- Presented by: Pippa Wetzell
- Country of origin: New Zealand
- Original language: English

Production
- Executive producer: Nicola Russell
- Camera setup: Multi-camera
- Running time: 30 minutes (with advertisements)

Original release
- Network: TVNZ 1
- Release: 7 April 1977 – 13 May 2024

Fair Go is a New Zealand consumer affairs television programme hosted by Pippa Wetzell. First aired in 1977, it was New Zealand's second longest-running local programme (after Country Calendar). It was also one of its highest-rated programmes, frequently placed high in the New Zealand TV Guide list of most viewed programmes. It aired its final episode on 13 May 2024.

== Content and programming ==
Fair Go features a mixture of investigative journalism and consumer affairs stories, based on the motto: "If you've been ripped off, short-changed or given the runaround and nobody wants to know...we do!"

Fair Go also held the annual Fair Go Ad Awards, in which the best and worst advertisements on New Zealand television are announced, and a competition to find the best 30-second video by New Zealand students is held.

== History ==
Fair Go began in 1977, the creation of presenter Brian Edwards and producer Peter Morritt. At the time it was seen as breaking new ground. It would not simply deal with consumer issues, it would investigate complaints from viewers and if those complaints were justified, it would name names. The biggest fear at the time was that the programme would attract huge lawsuits. Lawyers were hired to check every word on the script and the fears turned out to be groundless.

The other novel factor in the show was the high personality profile of its presenters and reporters. Other more recent high-profile presenters include Kevin Milne, Kerre McIvor (née Woodham), Carol Hirschfeld, Anna Thomas, Rosalie Nelson, Liane Clarke, Greg Boyed and Simon Mercep.

When Fair Go began it was shown in two 10- to 12-week seasons each year. But with the popularity of the show, and the huge number of complaints sent into the programme, it was decided in 1993 to produce one long season which would run for almost the entire year.

As the show matured, the complaints it dealt with involved higher stakes. Fair Go's biggest cash settlement was for over $350,000. There have been several other settlements involving six figure sums. However, the show will go into battle for as little as one cent (and has), if the issue behind the dispute is an interesting one. Fair Go has always considered entertainment and humour as suitable partners for its more investigative work.

In March 2024 it was proposed that Fair Go will be ending the following May due to a TVNZ restructure after experiencing financial difficulties. This news was confirmed in April 2024. Fair Go aired its final episode on 13 May 2024, with host Pippa Wetzell and the rest of the Fair Go team bidding farewell to viewers.

The Fair Go brand now operates as a four person current affairs team which makes content for TVNZ’s on-demand service.

== Cast and crew ==
As of April 2024, current reporters for the show, along with the two hosts, are Alistar Kata, Kaitlin Aldridge, Gill Higgins and Garth Bray.

Kevin Milne ONZM had worked on Fair Go from 1984 until 2010.

- Mary-Jane Aggett
- Philip Alpers
- Hadyn Jones
- Martyn Bates
- Greg Boyed
- Warwick Burke
- Anna Burns-Francis
- Judy Callingham
- John Campbell (broadcaster)
- Matt Chisholm
- Liane Clarke
- Pete Cronshaw
- Sharon Crosbie
- Mark Crysell
- Brett Dumbleton
- Brian Edwards
- Judith Fyfe
- Mark Hannan
- Gordon Harcourt
- Spencer Jolly
- Kim Hill
- Carol Hirschfeld
- Sandra Kailahi
- Brodie Kane
- Anna Kenna
- Lisa Manning
- Hugo Manson
- Alison Mau
- Gillian McGregor
- Kerre McIvor
- Eleisha McNeill
- Simon Mercep
- Libby Middlebrook
- Amanda Millar
- Kevin Milne
- Rosalie Nelson
- Alison Parr
- Sean Plunket
- Ruwani Perera
- Manorma Ram
- Raewyn Rasch
- Anna Thomas
- Richard Thomas
- Naomi Trigg
- Phil Vine
- Simon Walker
- Hannah Wallis (now a producer of Fair Go)
- Ray saru (producer)
- Kim Webby
- Vicki Wilkinson-Baker
- Barry Wilson
- Erica Wood

== Legacy ==
Although Fair Go does no longer exist as a television show, it still has a Facebook page where those who feel underrepresented or "ripped off" can still submit cases to them in an attempt to uphold consumer rights.

In May 2024, TVNZ promised the Fair Go brand will live on — with a new four-person long-form consumer and current affairs team to make content for TVNZ's digital platforms.

== Awards ==
In 1997, Fair Go was awarded a Bravo award by the New Zealand Skeptics for "poking a little of their irrepressible fun at alleged psychics providing lucky lotto numbers."

== Controversy ==
=== Broadcasting standards breaches ===
In March 2004, the Broadcasting Standards Authority (BSA) upheld a complaint against Fair Go concerning its September 2003 investigation into Adfit Membership Services Ltd, a company that collects gym membership fees. While most aspects of the complaint were not upheld, the Authority found that the programme had been unfair in suggesting Adfit’s contracts had not been legally tested, despite Adfit having informed the broadcaster of successful Disputes Tribunal and District Court outcomes. The BSA ruled that omitting this information misrepresented Adfit's position and breached the fairness standard. TVNZ was ordered to broadcast a corrective statement.

In August 2010, the BSA upheld complaints against Fair Go for breaching accuracy and fairness standards in a November 2009 broadcast that implied American photographer Dan Bush had falsely claimed ownership of a rainbow photograph. The programme featured a New Zealand woman who believed the image was hers and suggested Bush had “stolen” it, despite his website showing clear evidence he was the true creator. The BSA found that Fair Go misled viewers and treated Bush unfairly, contributing to threats and reputational harm. A privacy complaint was not upheld, as the information shown was already public. TVNZ was ordered to pay $1,000 in costs to the Crown.

In July 2011, the BSA upheld a complaint against Fair Go relating to a September 2010 hidden camera investigation into sales tactics used by Wenatex, a company selling high-priced beds. The programme featured footage of two sales consultants making claims about the health benefits of the beds, including a comment interpreted as suggesting one consultant no longer needed a wheelchair after using the product. The Authority found the consultants had been treated unfairly, as they were identifiable despite their faces being blurred and were not given a reasonable opportunity to respond to serious allegations. Although complaints under the privacy and accuracy standards were not upheld, TVNZ was ordered to pay $8,740 in legal costs to the complainants.

In December 2020, the BSA upheld a fairness complaint against Fair Go relating to a February 2020 broadcast investigating a fencing contractor. The BSA found the contractor was unfairly set up for a covert on-camera interview under false pretences and was not given a fair opportunity to respond to the allegations. It also determined that the inclusion of past criminal convictions, which were irrelevant to the issues at hand, contributed to an unjustly negative portrayal. The BSA did not uphold complaints under accuracy or balance standards but ordered TVNZ to pay $750 in costs to the Crown.

In August 2022, the BSA upheld a complaint against Fair Go concerning a 2021 episode about a delayed residential building project. The BSA found the programme breached accuracy and fairness standards by misrepresenting the causes of the delays and unfairly portraying the builder, Michael Morrison, and his company, New Homes Direct. While no breaches of privacy or balance standards were found, the BSA ordered TVNZ to broadcast and publish a summary of the findings, awarded $2,098.70 in legal costs and disbursements to the complainants, and imposed $1,000 in costs payable to the Crown.

== See also ==
- Target (New Zealand TV series)
