= List of programmes broadcast by Sky Free =

New Zealand-made television programmes

This is a list of New Zealand-made television programmes broadcast by Sky Free.

The free-to-air channels Three, Bravo, Eden, Rush, HGTV, streaming service ThreeNow, and current affairs service ThreeNews are operated by Sky Free, a subsidiary of satellite TV network Sky Network Television.

== Bravo ==
The following programmes were screened on Bravo.

=== Current programming ===
==== Reality / non-scripted ====
- The Circus (2021)
- The Real Housewives of Auckland (2016)

== Three ==
The following programmes were screened on Three.

=== Current programming ===
Title	Genre	First air date	Series	Status	Notes	Ref(s)
ThreeNews	News	6 July 2024	33		Previously 3 National News (1989–98), 3 News (1998–2016), Newshub, (2016-2024)	
7 Days	Panel show	21 August 2009	14	Season 14 ongoing		
CRC Motorsport	Sport	17 January 2010				
The Block NZ	Reality competition	4 July 2012 - 9 October 2022	10	Cancelled		
Dancing with the Stars	Talent show	31 May 2015	3	Renewed	Series 6–present, moved from TV One	
MasterChef New Zealand	Reality competition	26 July 2015	1	Renewed	Season 6–present, moved from TV One	
Arranged	Docuseries	20 March 2016	3	Season 3 ongoing		
The Hui	Current affairs show	10 April 2016	6	Renewed		
R&R with Eru & K'Lee	Talk show	16 May 2016	4		Previously R&R with Robert Rakete (2016–17)	
Married at First Sight NZ	Reality	1 October 2017	3	Pending		
Ford Ranger New Zealand Rural Games	Sports	17 March 2018	4	Pending		
Fish of the Day	Sports	7 April 2019	3	Pending	Season 3–present, moved from Prime	
Mean Mums	Sitcom	16 July 2019	2	Renewed		
Golden Boy	Sitcom	16 July 2019	2	Pending		
New Zealand Today	Satire	23 August 2019	2	Renewed		
The Gulf	Crime drama	26 August 2019	2	Pending		
David Lomas Investigates	Docuseries	14 April 2020	2	Renewed		
2nd Chance Charlie	Reality competition	17 June 2020	2	Pending		
Head High	Drama	28 June 2020	2	Pending		
ITM Fishing	Sports	1 August 2020	2	Pending	Previously The ITM Fishing Show (2008–13)	
Patrick Gower: On	Docuseries	31 August 2020	4 (films)	Renewed	Documentary film series	
Match Fit	Reality	20 October 2020	1	Renewed		
Bay Patrol	Docuseries	14 April 2021	1	Pending		
The Masked Singer NZ	Reality competition	9 May 2021	1	Renewed		
Piri's Tiki Tour	Docuseries	8 August 2021	1	Pending	Season 4–present, moved from Whakaata Māori	
House Rules NZ	Reality competition	10 September 2023	1	Pending	Season 1–present	
n00b	Sitcom	17 October 2024	1	Pending		

=== Former programming ===
Title	Genre	First air date	Last air date	No. of series	Notes	Ref(s)
Aotearoa Music Awards	Awards show	19 November 2015	15 November 2020	6	Previously aired on various networks including Three, moved to TVNZ 2.	
Moving Out with Kanoa	Lifestyle	14 November 2019	19 December 2019	1		
Newshub Late	Current affairs show	1 February 2016	31 May 2024		Previously Newsworthy (2015)	
Newshub Nation	Current affairs show	20 March 2010	2 December 2023	12	Previously The Nation (2010–17)	
AM	Breakfast Television	13 February 2017	5 July 2024	6		

==== Dramas ====
Title	Genre	First air date	Last air date	No. of series	Notes	Ref(s)
The New Adventures of Black Beauty	Period family drama	2 June 1990	1990	1		
Homeward Bound	Soap opera	11 June 1992	29 October 1992	1		
Cover Story	Drama	1995	1995	1	Moved to TV One for series 2.	
The Strip	Drama	5 March 2002	11 November 2003	2		
Mataku	Anthology drama	3 October 2002	19 December 2002	2	Moved to TV One for season 3.	
Outrageous Fortune	Comedy-drama	12 July 2005	9 November 2010	6		
Doves of War	Thriller	2 February 2006	2006	1		
The Almighty Johnsons	Fantasy drama	7 February 2011	26 September 2013	3		
Underbelly NZ: Land of the Long Green Cloud	Crime drama	17 August 2011	21 September 2011	1	Miniseries	
The Blue Rose	Crime drama	4 February 2013	29 April 2013	1		
Harry	Crime drama	8 May 2013	12 June 2013	1		
Hope and Wire	Drama	3 July 2014	17 July 2014	1		
Westside	Comedy-drama	31 May 2015	16 November 2020	6		
Jonah	Drama	18 August 2019	19 August 2019	1	Miniseries	
Friends Like Her	Drama	15 April 2024	6 May 2024	1	Television series	
Tangata Pai	Drama	16 September 2025	28 October 2025	1	Television series	

==== Comedies ====
Title	Genre	First air date	Last air date	No. of series	Notes	Ref(s)
Letter to Blanchy	Sitcom	1 December 1989			Series later picked up by TV One	
The Billy T James Show	Sitcom	13 June 1990	1990	1		
Issues	Sketch comedy	14 August 1990; 1992	1990; 1993	3	Previously known as 1990: The Issues (season 1), Moved to TV One for More Issues (season 2), then back to TV3.	
Away Laughing	Sketch	6 May 1991	1992	2		
Melody Rules	Sitcom	1994	1995	2		
bro'Town	Adult animation comedy	22 September 2004	24 May 2009	5		
Pulp Sport	Sports comedy	10 November 2005	16 October 2009	5	Seasons 3–7, Moved from C4.	
The Jaquie Brown Diaries	Sitcom	25 July 2008	11 December 2009	2		
Comedy Gala	Comedy	6 May 2009	27 April 2018	10	Moved from and then back to TVNZ 2.	
@Seven	Comedy	21 December 2009	22 January 2010	1		
Radiradirah	Sketch comedy	21 May 2010	9 July 2010	1		
Wanna-Ben	Comedy	8 October 2010	23 March 2012	2		
The Best of Moon TV	Comedy	7 January 2011	4 February 2011	1		
Super City	Sketch comedy	11 February 2011	20 September 2013	2		
The Jono Project	Sketch comedy	20 May 2011	18 November 2011	1	Moved from C4 after season 1.	
Brown Bruthaz	Comedy	14 October 2011	11 November 2011	1		
Hounds	Comedy	1 June 2012	6 July 2012	1		
Golden	Comedy	17 June 2012	22 July 2012	1		
Jono and Ben	Satire	13 July 2012	15 November 2018	7	Previously known as Jono and Ben at Ten from seasons 1–3.	
Sunny Skies	Sitcom	8 February 2013	15 March 2013	1		
Chopper's Republic of Anzakistan	Comedy	17 July 2015	21 August 2015	1		
Funny Girls	Sketch comedy	23 October 2015	20 September 2018	3		
Subject: Dad	Comedy	2 February 2018	20 April 2018	1		

- 7 Days of Sport (2015)
- A Thousand Apologies (2008)
- After Hours (2014)
- AotearoHA: Next Big Things (2011)
- AotearoHA: Rising Stars (2015)
- Ben & Steve: World Famous In (2013)
- Ewen Gilmour: Westie Legend (2015)
- Love Mussel (2001)
- The Millen Baird Show (2008)
- Poking the Borax (2011)
- The Radio (2013)
- Skitz (1993–97)
- Tele Laughs (1996–97)

==== Reality / non-scripted ====
Title	Genre	First air date	Last air date	No. of series	Notes	Ref(s)
Target	Consumer protection	1999	7 August 2012	14		
Going Straight	Reality competition	2003	2003	1		
Downsize Me!	Reality	August 2005	November 2008	3		
So You Think You Can Dance	Reality competition	12 February 2006	23 April 2006	1		
Wa$ted!	Reality	20 February 2007	8 April 2008	2		
Downsize My Pet!	Reality	18 September 2007	13 December 2007	1		
New Zealand's Next Top Model	Reality competition	13 March 2009	2 September 2011	3		
Destroyed in Seconds	Docuseries	March 2010		1		
The Real Hustle New Zealand	Docuseries	22 March 2010	24 May 2010	1		
Road Cops	Factual	16 August 2010	16 June 2015	4		
Bigger, Better, Faster, Stronger	Reality	7 February 2011	11 April 2011	1		
The GC	Reality	2 May 2012	7 April 2014	2	Moved to Four for series 3.	
The X Factor	Reality competition	21 April 2013	18 May 2015	2		
The Great Food Race	Reality competition	2 February 2014	27 April 2014	1		
Cadbury Dream Factory	Reality competition	20 February 2014	10 April 2014	1		
The Bachelor New Zealand	Dating game show	17 March 2015	22 May 2017	3	Moved to TVNZ 2 for series 4.	
Come Dine with Me New Zealand	Reality competition	15 June 2015	7 August 2015	1		
Grand Designs New Zealand	Docuseries	4 October 2015	9 November 2020	6	Moved to TVNZ 1.	

- 111 Emergency (2011)
- Big (2011)
- The Big Stuff (2008)
- Cafe Secrets (2011–12)
- Candid Camera (1991–92)
- Creative Living (2016)
- Crime Exposed (2013)
- Does My Bum Look Big? (2007)
- Dog Patrol (2011)
- Drug Bust (2011–12)
- Emergency Heroes (2009–10)
- The Family (2003)
- Family Secret (2013–14)
- Fusion Feasts (2013–14)
- Hitched (2009–10)
- Honey, We're Killing the Kids (2006)
- New Zealand's Hottest Home Baker (2010–13)
- Hot Property (2000–03)
- The Kitchen Job (2008–10)
- Lost & Found (2015–19)
- Marae DIY (2015–16, moved from and back to Māori Television)
- Million Dollar Catch (2009)
- Money Man (2006–09)
- Native Kitchen (2015–16)
- A New Zealand Food Story (2020)
- Noise Control (2011)
- On the Grill (2012)
- Police Stop (1996–97)
- Reality Trip (2015)
- Reel Late with Kate (2010–11)
- The Ridges (2012)
- Road Madness (2012–15)
- Lion Red. RUGBY CLUB (1998) About the North Harbour rugby union in the 1998 NPC first division season.
- Saving Gen-Y (2013)
- The Secret Lives of Dancers (2010–14)
- Sing Like a Superstar (2005)
- Smokefreerockquest (1996, 1998–2000, 2006, 2016)
- Testing the Menu (2013)
- Think Tank (2011–13)
- Thirsty Work (2016)
- Ansett New Zealand Time of Your Life (1996–97)
- Under the Grill (2011)
- What's Really in Our Food? (2008–12)
- World Kitchen (2009–11)

==== Awards shows ====
- Aotearoa Film & Television Awards (2011)

==== Game shows ====
Title	First air date	Last air date	No. of series	Notes	Ref(s)
Sale of the Century	5 September 1994	1995		Moved from TV2 and TV One.	
Woolworths Ready Steady Cook	13 July 1998	September 1998	1	Moved to TV2.	
Joker Poker	10 February 2007	25 May 2008	4		
Deal or No Deal	6 June 2007	26 December 2007	1		
Would I Lie to You?	12 February 2012	28 September 2012	1		
Family Feud	15 February 2016	27 November 2017	3		
All Star Family Feud	28 March 2016	29 November 2018	3		

- Off the Planet (1997)
- Perfect Match (1989–1990)
- The Price Is Right (1992)

==== News and information ====
Title	Genre	First air date	Last air date	No. of series	Notes	Ref(s)
A Current Affair	Current affairs	1989	16 February 1990			
Nightline	Late-night news	12 February 1990	20 December 2013			
60 Minutes	News magazine	25 March 1990; 13 February 2002	1992; 2 December 2012		Moved to TV One from 1993–2002, then to Prime.	
The Westcott File	Current affairs	9 July 1990	1990			
The Ralston Group	Talk show	13 June 1991	23 August 1994	4		
20/20	News magazine	10 January 1993	10 December 2003		Moved to TV2, then TVNZ 1.	
Sports Tonight	Sports news	15 February 2004	21 December 2012			
Campbell Live	Current affairs	21 March 2005	29 May 2015			
Sunrise	Breakfast television	2 October 2007	9 April 2010			
ASB Business	News	6 October 2008	8 April 2010			
Firstline	Breakfast television	7 March 2011	2 April 2015	5		
Three60	Current affairs	6 May 2012	November 2015	4		
Media3	Media affairs	11 August 2012	3 July 2013	2		
3D	Current affairs	6 March 2013	14 December 2015	3	Previously known as 3rd Degree (2013–14)	
The Vote	Current affairs debate show	27 March 2013	6 November 2013	1		
The Paul Henry Show	Late-night news	27 January 2014	19 December 2014	1		
Paul Henry	Breakfast television	7 April 2015	16 December 2016	2		
Newsworthy	Late-night news	8 June 2015	18 December 2015	1		
Story	Current affairs	10 August 2015	16 December 2016	2		
The Café	Breakfast television	11 April 2016	2020	5		
The Spinoff TV	Current affairs	22 June 2018	5 October 2018	1		
Rebuilding Paradise with Paul Henry	Current affairs	20 April 2020	14 May 2020	1		

- 5:30 Live (1993–94)
- Four Corners (1993–94)

==== Documentaries ====
- Aftershock – Would You Survive? (2008)
- Both Worlds (2012–18)
- The Eruption: Stories of Survival (2020)
- Funny Roots (2012)
- The Good Shit (2018)
- Great War Stories (2014–18)
- House of Champions (2019)
- Inside New Zealand (1991–2013)
- The James Gang Rides Again (9 August 1990)
- Kiwis Coming Home (2021)
- Missing Pieces (2009–12)
- Options (1990)
- Pacman (1990)
- Prison Families (2013–14)
- The Race for Motutapu (2018)
- Reaching for the Skies (1990)
- Rocked the Nation: 100 NZ Sporting Moments (2011)
- Stan (2018)
- Taranaki Hard (2020)
- Te Mana Te Ihi Te Wairua (1990)
- Til Death Do Us Part: The Antony de Malmanche Story (2015)
- The Valley (2017)
- Waka (1990)
- Who Owns New Zealand Now? (2017)

==== Sports ====
Title	Genre	First air date	Last air date	No. of series	Notes	Ref(s)
Gone Fishin'	Fishing	20 November 1993	19 July 2020	26		
Outdoors with Geoff	Fishing	2003	26 March 2016	17		
The ITM Fishing Show	Fishing	26 April 2008	September 2013	6	Season 5–10, Moved from TV One after season 4, then back after season 10.	
Big Angry Fish	Fishing	29 April 2012	8 September 2019	8		
Big Bash Boxing	Professional boxing	1 July 2016	12 November 2016			

- Aussie Big League (1993–94)
- Cup Talk (2011)
- Golf World (2013–16)
- Makita Sports Machine (1994)
- Mobil Motorsport Show (1996)
- Mobil Sport (1990–95)
- Reebok 3 Sport Sunday (1992)
- Sportsworld (1989)
- Wynn's Sport (1990–91)

==== Children's and youth programming ====
Title	Genre	First air date	Last air date	No. of series	Notes	Ref(s)
Infocus	News magazine	15 September 1990	1995			
3pm	Children's	3 February 1992	25 December 1992			
You and Me	Children's	13 July 1992	1998			
Oscar and Friends	Children's animation adventure	30 December 1995	20 January 1996	1		
Suzy's World	Children's education	September 1999	September 2002	4		
Being Eve	Comedy-drama	25 August 2001	12 July 2002	2		
Sticky TV	Children's	2002; 4 July 2016	2011; 25 December 2017		Moved to Four, then back to Three again.	
Maddigan's Quest	Children's fantasy	11 February 2006	5 May 2006	1		
The Moe Show	Children's	19 December 2016	4 August 2017	2	Seasons 3–4, Moved from Four.	
Amped	Children's programming	8 April 2020	1 May 2020	1		

- Aunties' Alphabet (1991)
- Ice As (2000)
- Ice TV (1995–1999)
- Push Play (2010)
- Short Sportz (1991–93)
- The Simon Eliot Show (2007–08)

==== Saturday morning ====
Title	Genre	First air date	Last air date	No. of series	Notes	Ref(s)
EBS	Children's	27 November 1989	1992		Previously known as The Early Bird Show (1989–1990)	
Squirt	Children's	1 March 1996	1997		Moved to TV2.	

- Pacific Beat St (2006–10)
- Ya Hoo (1991–93)

==== Television films ====
Title	Genre	First air date	Notes	Ref(s)
Ihaka: Blunt Instrument	Crime drama	22 February 2002		
Stolen	Crime drama	28 July 2010		
Toke	Crime drama	14 September 2020		

- Aftershock (2008)

== ThreeNow ==
The following programmes were released on ThreeNow.

=== Children's programming ===
Title	Genre	First air date	Last air date	No. of series	Notes	Ref(s)
Lucy Lewis Can't Lose	Children's comedy	8 August 2016	18 September 2017	2		

== Former channels ==
=== C4 ===
The following programmes were screened on C4.

==== Comedy ====
- Back of the Y (2008–09)
- Bogan Family Films (2010)
- Jono’s New Show (2008)
- The Jono Project (2010)
- Pulp Sport (2003–04)

==== Reality / non-scripted ====
- Making Tracks (2008–10)
- Roll the Dai (2007)
- Roll the Dai: Outback (2008)
- Smokefreerockquest (2007–10)
- Studentville (2006–07)

==== Documentaries ====
- Rocked the Nation: 100 NZ Music Moments (2008)
- Rocked the Nation 2: 100 NZ Pop Culture Stories (2009)

==== Game shows ====
- Pop! Goes the Weasel (2005–07)
- Celebrity Joker Poker (2007–08)

==== Awards shows ====
- New Zealand Music Awards (2004–10)

==== News and information ====
- Special Features (2005–08)

==== Music shows ====
- 6 Degrees
- 10 Reasons
- 10 Years Of... (2007)
- Added This Week (2003)
- Ampd (2003–06)
- The Big Breakfast (2007)
- Blender (2004)
- The Boost Mobile Holla Hour (2006)
- C4U (2013)
- Edge Chart (2003)
- The Best...
- Spoon
- Homegrown (2003)
- Insert Video Here
- Intellectual Property (2003–06)
- The Official NZ Top 40 (2003–10)
- Select (2003–10)
- Select Live (2003–10)
- So Hot Right Now
- Steel Mill
- Top 10/100
- U Choose 40 (2006–11, 2013)
- Video Hits
- What's The Theme?
- Fade To Black

=== Four ===
The following programmes were screened on Four.

==== Children's programming ====
- Kiwisport TV (2011)
- The Moe Show (2013–16)
- Sticky TV (2011–16)

==== News and information ====
- Drew and Shannon Live (2011)
- Four Live (2012–14)

==== Reality / non-scripted ====
- The GC (2015)
- Smirnoff Night Project (2011)
- Smokefreerockquest (2011–15)

==== Awards shows ====
- New Zealand Music Awards (2011–14)
