= Dai Henwood =

New Zealand comedian and television host (1978–2026)

Dai Henwood ONZM
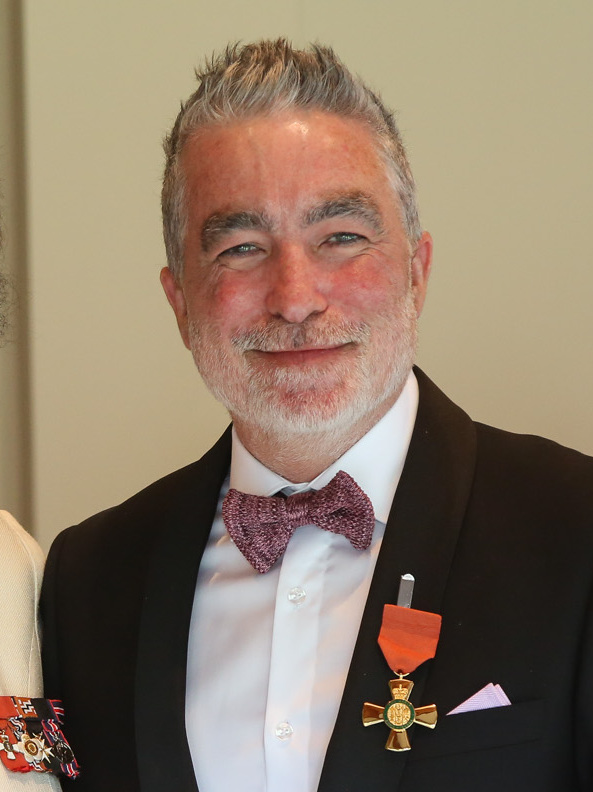
- Henwood in 2025
- Born: Dafydd Morgan Henwood; 7 February 1978; Wellington, New Zealand
- Died: 10 November 2026 (aged 48); Auckland, New Zealand
- Education: Victoria University of Wellington
- Occupations: Stand-up comedian; television host
- Years active: 1999–2026
- Spouse: Joanna Kelly
- Children: 2
- Parent(s): Ray Henwood (father); Carolyn Henwood (mother)
- Relatives: Dick Jones (great-grandfather)
- Awards: Billy T Award (2002); Fred Award (2007, 2015)

Dafydd Morgan "Dai" Henwood ONZM (7 February 1978 – 10 November 2026) was a New Zealand stand-up comedian and television host. He first performed comedy when he was studying Theatre and Film at Victoria University of Wellington. His television career began in 1999, when he appeared on the TV2 comedy show Pulp Comedy. He then went on to tour internationally as a stand-up comedian in 2004, and host the television show Insert Video Here on C4.

From 2009 until 2022, Henwood was a regular panel guest on the New Zealand comedy show 7 Days as the weekly captain. He continued to perform stand-up comedy as well as host and made regular appearances on various television shows around New Zealand.

== Early life and education ==
Henwood was born in Wellington, on 7 February 1978, to father Ray and mother Judge Carolyn Henwood. Henwood stated his great-grandfather was Welsh international rugby player Dick Jones. He went to Wellington College for secondary school and studied Theatre and Film at Victoria University of Wellington. He graduated with a BA in eastern religions. Henwood won Best New Face on TV2's Pulp Comedy in 1999, the Billy T Award in 2002 and the Fred Award in 2007 and again in 2015.

== Career ==
Henwood with Governor-General Dame Cindy Kiro in Auckland in September 2025

In 2004 and 2005, Henwood toured the shows The Hot Steppa and Champagne Table Tennis, and performed at the Tokyo Comedy Store and in Melbourne and around Britain. He subsequently performed seasons in both Auckland and Wellington during the New Zealand International Comedy Festival including the shows Dai-namic Scenarios (2007–2008), Shabba (2009), Dai Another Day (2009), Ideals vs. Reality (2010), Fonzie Touched Me (2011) and Adapt or Dai (2013). In 2008, he was invited to the Montreal Just For Laughs Festival and recorded a televised gala special.

Henwood won the Billy T Award in 2002 for his show The Story of Funk, which he performed as a professional wrestler named "P Funk Chainsaw".

He spent a period on TV3's Sunrise morning show, as the gadget guy, giving humorous reviews of various gadgets. He subsequently rose to prominence after featuring on television channel C4 hosting Insert Video Here in 2007. Henwood then went on to host two series of comedy travel show Roll The Dai, also on C4.

From 2009 until 2022, Henwood was weekly captain of Team Two on Three's weekly panel comedy show 7 Days, filming over 150 episodes in that time. He later appeared occasionally.

Henwood recorded two DVDs, Dai Another Day, released by EMI in late 2009, and Adapt or Dai, released by Universal Music in 2013.

In 2016, Henwood was presented with the Rielly Comedy Award from the Variety Artists Club of New Zealand.

He released a memoir, The Life of Dai, in June 2024, through HarperCollins.

In the 2025 King's Birthday Honours, Henwood was appointed an Officer of the New Zealand Order of Merit, for services to the entertainment industry and charitable fundraising.

== Personal life ==
Henwood was known for being a fan of NRL team the New Zealand Warriors.

He was married to art teacher Joanna "Jo" Kelly. They had two children.

=== Health and death ===
In January 2023, in an interview on The Project, Henwood publicly announced that he was diagnosed with metastatic bowel cancer in 2020. In 2024, he made a three-part docuseries, Live and Let Dai, in which he shared his cancer journey. Also in 2024, he also released an autobiography, The Life of Dai, which covered his 27-year comedy career and his cancer diagnosis.

Due to his ongoing cancer treatment, Henwood was forced to cancel remaining dates of his New Zealand tour of his show Dai Hard in May 2025.

Henwood died from bowel cancer in Auckland Hospital, on 10 November 2026, aged 48.

== Filmography ==
=== Film ===
Title	Year	Role	Notes
Kiwi Flyer	2012	Mr. Lumsden	
A Kiwi Legend	2013	Himself	Short film

=== Television ===
Title	Year	Role	Notes
The Tribe	1999	Boy / Youth No.1	2 episodes
Xena: Warrior Princess	2001	Siki	Episode: "Old Ares Had a Farm"
Revelations – The Initial Journey	2003	Carlos	Episode: "David and Mr. G"
Insert Video Here	2007	Host	
Vodafone New Zealand Music Awards	2007–2009	Host	
Roll the Dai	2007–2008	Host	
Jono's New Show	2008	Himself	
Dai's Protege	2009	Host	
7 Days	2009–2022	Team 1 Leader / Team 2 Leader	
Stand Up	2010		Documentary
The Jono Project	2010	Himself	
7 Days of Sport	2015	Forwards Leader / Team Member	
Family Feud	2016–2017	Host	
The Moe Show	2017	Himself	2 episodes
The Project	2017–2023	Backup Host	
Dancing with the Stars	2018	Host	
Lego Masters	2022–2023	Host	
Guy Montgomery's Guy Mont-Spelling Bee	2023	Himself	
Taskmaster New Zealand	2023	Himself	Season 4
Live and Let Dai	2024	Himself	

== Live shows ==
Henwood performed many comedy shows, including at the New Zealand International Comedy Festival (NZICF):

Dai Henwood NZICF shows
Year	Title
2002	The Story of Funk
2004	The Hot Steppa
2005	Champagne Table Tennis
2007	Dai-namic Scenarios
2009	Shabba
2009	Dai Another Day
2010	Ideals vs. Reality
2010	Fonzie Touched Me
2013	Adapt or Dai
2015	Daigression

== Awards and nominations ==
Year	Award	Result
1999	Dynamic Innovative Video Awards	Winner
1999	Best New Face Award	Winner
2002	Billy T James Comedy Award	Winner
2004	The New Zealand Comedy Guild Awards	Winner – Best Male Comedian
2005	The New Zealand Comedy Guild Awards	Winner – Best Male Comedian
2006	The New Zealand Comedy Guild Awards	Winner – Best Television Performance
2006	The New Zealand Comedy Guild Awards	Best MC
2007	TV Guide Best On The Box Awards Nomination	Winner – Funniest Person On Television
2007	The New Zealand Comedy Guild Awards Nomination	The Kevin Smith Memorial Cup for Best Artist Achievement
2007	The New Zealand Comedy Guild Awards Nomination	Best New Zealand On Screen Comedy Performance
2007	The New Zealand Comedy Guild Awards Nomination	Best Male Comedian
2007	Cleo Music Awards	Best Music TV Presenter
2007	Best New Zealand Comedian	The Fred Award

== Bibliography ==
- Henwood, Dai (1 June 2024). The Life of Dai. HarperCollins. ISBN 9781775492863.

== See also ==
- List of New Zealand television personalities
