= Battle Circus =

Battle Circus may refer to:

- Battle Circus (film), a 1953 film starring Humphrey Bogart
- Battle Circus (band), a progressive rock band from New Zealand
  - Battle Circus (album), Battle Circus's eponymous debut album
