= Decortica =

New Zealand rock band

- Origin: Auckland, New Zealand
- Genres: Rock; Alternative rock Progressive rock
- Years active: 2005 – present
- Labels: Independent; EMI Music New Zealand
- Members: Mathew Bosher; Tory "Jester" Staples; Brendon Kahi
- Past members: Daniel Bosher; Antoinette Lee
- Website: www.decortica.com

Decortica is a New Zealand alternative rock and progressive rock band from Auckland. Formed in 2005, the group consists of Mathew Bosher (lead vocals and guitar), Tory "Jester" Staples (drums) and Brendon Kahi (bass).

== Band history ==
=== A New Aesthetic (2008) ===
The debut album was recorded in Raglan, New Zealand with producer David Holmes (also known from Kerretta). The band converted a beach house into a live-in studio for two weeks. The location has since been used by other New Zealand musicians including Shapeshifter and Battle Circus.

The album received a 4 out of 5 star rating in Groove Guide magazine and was described in a review by NZ Musician Magazine as "very contemporary, almost futuristic rock". The video for "Macchina" was included in the top 10 music videos of the James Coleman Collection of 130 New Zealand music videos, while "Featherlight" received a nomination for a Handle the Jandal award.

=== Love Hotel (2010–2011) ===
Decortica's second album was released online in August 2010 independently using the freemium model. A concept album, the album narrative is set in a Japanese love hotel. The music featured more progressive rock qualities than previous material. The album received positive reviews including a 5/5 rating from The NewReview. In 2011, the band signed to EMI Music New Zealand which re-released the album on 31 October 2011 on CD and iTunes in that territory. The iTunes release featured a bonus track: a trip rock remix "The Sadness of Men" (Mizu Shōbai Mix).

=== 11811 (2012) ===
The band entered York Street Studio on 13 January 2012 to start tracking the record - their third with David Holmes as producer. Sessions were later moved to a makeshift studio on a farm in Coatesville, New Zealand. The album was released 26 October 2012 in New Zealand and online and received positive reviews: "...where 11811 really delivers is in the fact that it’s short and sharp but never unnecessarily brutal. There is heart and soul within these songs. In fact there are songs – that's a start; often that’s the biggest struggle for music that identifies with (modern) metal."

== Discography ==
=== Studio albums ===
- "A New Aesthetic" (2008)
- "Love Hotel" (2011)
- "11811" (2012)
