= James Coleman (broadcaster) =

New Zealand broadcaster and actor

- Born: James Coleman; Marton, New Zealand
- Occupations: Television presenter, radio host, actor

James Coleman is a New Zealand television presenter, radio host and actor.

== Radio ==
Coleman first became prominent in radio broadcasting during his time on the now-defunct alternative rock station Channel Z. Following the station's demise he worked on Kiwi FM and was previously a regular host on Radio Live but after poor ratings, Coleman resigned.

== Television ==
Coleman was the first host of TV3's Breakfast television show Sunrise. After poor ratings, Coleman resigned and was replaced by Oliver Driver. The show was subsequently cancelled.

He also starred as a fictionalized version of himself in Series 2 of The Jaquie Brown Diaries.

In 2011, Coleman was the host of Bigger, Better, Faster, Stronger, which was nominated for an Aotearoa Film and Television Award.

== Film ==
In 2001, Coleman acted in the local film Stickmen.

== See also ==
- List of New Zealand television personalities
