= 2012 in New Zealand television =

This is a list of New Zealand television events and premieres that occurred in 2012, the 53nd year of continuous operation of television in New Zealand.

== Events ==
- 2 December – 15-year-old singer and guitarist Clara van Wel wins the second series of New Zealand's Got Talent.

== Premieres ==
=== Domestic ===
- 29 April – Big Angry Fish (TV3) (2012)
- 6 May – Pocket Protectors (TV2) (also Canada) (2012)
- 1 June – Hounds (TV3) (2012)
- 4 July – The Block NZ (TV3) (2012–present)
- 13 July – Jono and Ben (TV3) (2012–present)
- 31 August – Now is the Hour (TV2) (2012)

=== International ===
- 3 March – (United States) ThunderCats (2011) (TV2)
- 5 March – (United States) Fanboy & Chum Chum (Four)
- 7 June – (United Kingdom) / (United States) Jim Henson's Pajanimals (TV2)
- 11 June – (United States) / (Canada) / (Singapore) Dinosaur Train (TV2)
- 5 December – (United States) Alcatraz (TV One)
- (United Kingdom) Olly the Little White Van (TVNZ Kidzone)
- (Republic of Ireland) Punky (TVNZ Kidzone)
- (United States) Jake and the Never Land Pirates (TV2)

== Channels ==
Closures:

- 30 June: TVNZ 7
