= Morgana O'Reilly =

New Zealand television and stage actor

- Born: Morgana Le Fay Naomi Jane O'Reilly; 19 August 1985 (age 41); New Zealand
- Occupation: Actress
- Years active: 2003–present
- Spouse: Peter Salmon
- Children: 2

Morgana O'Reilly (born 19 August 1985) is a New Zealand film, television and theatre actress. She has appeared in several theatre productions and created the one-woman play The Height of the Eiffel Tower, which she performed at the Edinburgh Fringe Festival in 2014. O'Reilly played Lynn Matthews in the biographical television film Billy and starred as Kylie Bucknell in the horror-comedy Housebound. She has made appearances in Nothing Trivial, Sunny Skies, This is Littleton. O'Reilly played Naomi Canning in Neighbours from 2014 until 2015. She made guest appearances in 2020 and 2022. She starred in sitcom Mean Mums and joined the cast of Wentworth as Narelle Stang in 2019. O'Reilly and her husband Peter Salmon created the comedy-thriller INSiDE, which won the International Emmy Award for Best Short-Form Series in 2021.

== Early life ==
Morgana Le Fay Naomi Jane O'Reilly was born in New Zealand to Mary-Jane, a dancer and choreographer, and Phil O'Reilly, a graphic designer. She grew up in the Ponsonby/Grey Lynn area. O'Reilly said she got her love of performing from her mother and that she wanted to be an actor since she was 15. O'Reilly attended Unitec Institute of Technology and graduated in 2006.

== Career ==
After graduating from Unitec, O'Reilly appeared in several theatre productions, including Three Sisters, Marat/Sade and Coram Boy. She also undertook some bar work at The Basement Theatre in Auckland. After a stint in the comedy show A Thousand Apologies, O'Reilly was cast in a new production of Toa Fraser's play Bare. The director, Oliver Driver, said O'Reilly was cast because of her ability to play several different characters.

In 2009, O'Reilly created a one-woman play called The Height of the Eiffel Tower. The play focuses on Terri Hulme, a mother of four, who takes a closer look at her life when she goes on a coffee date with an old university friend. O'Reilly approached her friend Abigail Greenwood to direct and act as dramaturge. Her mother Mary-Jane O'Reilly danced a solo piece on stage for the first time in years, before O'Reilly premiered The Height of the Eiffel Tower. The play was well-received and O'Reilly went on to perform it at the New York Fringe Festival.

After O'Reilly was cast as Amber in Thomas Sainsbury's black comedy Dance Troupe Supreme, she turned to her mother for help researching the role due to her background in dance. In 2011, O'Reilly appeared in the biographical television film Billy, where she played Lynn Matthews, the wife of comedian, musician and actor Billy T. James. She also starred as Desdemona in Jesse Peach's production of Othello and made a guest appearance in the comedy-drama series Nothing Trivial, as lead character Mac's love interest, Alison.

O'Reilly went on to star in the television film Safe House, which aired during TV One's Sunday Night Theatre. She was also cast in TV3's comedy series Sunny Skies as Nicky, an "independent, organised campground owner". On 30 December 2013, it was announced O'Reilly had joined the cast of Neighbours as Naomi Canning. O'Reilly attended two rounds of auditions before she won the role. O'Reilly and her husband filmed her first audition in their garden in Sydney, before O'Reilly flew to Melbourne to audition in the studio, with cast members Colette Mann and Stefan Dennis. She made her first appearance as Naomi on 25 March 2014.

O'Reilly appeared in This is Littleton in February 2014. She also wrote for the series. O'Reilly stars as Kylie Bucknell in Gerard Johnstone's horror-comedy Housebound, which had its world premiere at SXSW. For her performance as Kylie, O'Reilly earned a nomination for Best Actress at the 2014 Rialto Channel New Zealand Film Awards. O'Reilly performed The Height of the Eiffel Tower at the Edinburgh Festival Fringe in August 2014. O'Reilly departed Neighbours in mid-2015 to pursue new acting roles. The following year, she was cast as the female lead, Vanda, in the Auckland Theatre Company's production of Venus in Fur.

In 2017, O'Reilly directed a touring production of family drama deVINE with the RECollective Theatre Company. In August that year, she starred as Stella Kowalski in A Streetcar Named Desire at the Silo Theatre. O'Reilly and Anna Jullienne appeared in the 2018 comedy pilot Mean Mums, which competed against four other sitcoms as part of Three's Comedy Pilot Week. The pilot performed well and MediaWorks New Zealand picked it up to series. In 2019, O'Reilly joined the cast of Wentworth, playing the role of "volatile" prisoner Narelle Stang. The following year, she returned to Neighbours for a guest stint, and appeared in mystery drama series The Sounds. O'Reilly also starred in comedy-thriller INSiDE, created with her husband Peter Salmon during New Zealand's COVID-19 lockdown. The series was filmed in the couple's house in Auckland. INSiDE won the International Emmy Award for Best Short-Form Series.

O'Reilly guested in an episode of the 2022 New Zealand comedy series Kid Sister. She also made a cameo appearance in Neighbours in July 2022, and appeared in the comedy film Nude Tuesday, which features full nudity. O'Reilly stars in the season final of the comedy anthology series Summer Love. She also created and toured a one-woman theatre show called Stories About My Body from late 2022 until early 2023. The show is an account of O'Reilly's relationship with her body, with material taken from her personal diaries. In January 2024, O'Reilly joined the cast of American dark comedy The White Lotus for its third season. Production began in February.

On 16 September 2024, O'Reilly was named as part of the cast for the Paramount+ series Playing Gracie Darling at the 2025 Channel 10 / Paramount+ Upfronts. Filming on the six-part series began in January 2025 in the Hawkesbury River region. O'Reilly plays child psychologist Joni, whose best friend disappeared when they were teenagers. She also joined the cast of New Zealand comedy series Small Town Scandal, alongside Alexander England. The series is a screen adaptation of Tom Sainsbury's comedy murder mystery podcast.

On 21 October 2026, the ABC announced at their 2027 Upfronts event that O'Reilly would lead crime series Rural Crime Unit.

== Personal life ==
O'Reilly is married to filmmaker Peter Salmon. O'Reilly announced her pregnancy on 6 June 2015, and she gave birth to their daughter on 25 August. O'Reilly gave birth to their second child, a son, in 2018.

== Filmography ==
=== Television ===
Year	Title	Role	Notes
2008	The Jaquie Brown Diaries	Alt girl	1 episode
2008	A Thousand Apologies	Various	TV series
2009	Piece of My Heart	June Watt	TV film
2011	Billy T James	Lynn Matthews	TV film
2011	Nothing Trivial	Alison	
2012	Safe House	Carol Taylor	TV film
2013	Sunny Skies	Nicky	
2014	This is Littleton	Various characters	Also writer
2014–2015, 2020, 2022	Neighbours	Naomi Canning	Main cast
2018–2022	Mean Mums	Jess	Main cast
2019	Below	Guard	Main cast
2019	Wentworth	Narelle Stang	2 episodes
2019	Secret Bridesmaids' Business	Rachel Atwood	Miniseries
2019	Rosehaven	Pen	Episode: #4.8
2020	The Sounds	Hannah McGregor	7 episodes
2020	INSiDE	Rose	Miniseries
2021	My Life Is Murder	Dennie	Episode: "Wild Life"
2022	Kid Sister	Sarah	Episode: #1.3
2022	Summer Love	Becky	Episodes: "Trevor & Frankie"
2024	Friends Like Her	Nicole	TV series
2025	Playing Gracie Darling	Joni Gray	TV series
2025	The White Lotus	Pam	TV series
2026	Bust Up	Deb	
2026	Small Town Scandal	Katie	TV series
2026	Taskmaster New Zealand	Self – Contestant	TV series
2027	Rural Crime Unit	Rita	TV series

=== Film ===
Year	Title	Role	Notes
2007	Knickers	Chole	Short
2011	Dr Grordbort	Millicent	Short
2011	Rebecca 2	Vixen Misfit	
2012	Ten Thousand Days	Arabella	Short
2012	We Feel Fine	Kelly	
2014	Housebound	Kylie Bucknell	Nominated – Rialto Channel New Zealand Film Award for Best Actress
2019	Below	MIchelle	
2022	Nude Tuesday	Shan	
2022	Don't Make Me Go	Krystal	
2024	Bookworm	Zo	
TBA	Scales	Bianca	Film
