= Thedownlowconcept =

Auckland production company and creative collective

thedownlowconcept is a production company and creative collective based in Auckland, New Zealand, specializing in producing comedy for film, radio and television. It was formed in 2002 by Jarrod Holt, Ryan Hutchings and Nigel McCulloch, and have since frequently collaborated with actor and comedian Josh Thomson. They are notable for their quirky, irreverent, and sometimes controversial comedic style.

== Notable productions ==
=== 7 Days ===
In 2009 thedownlowconcept created a popular and award winning comedy game show 7 Days, based on their news-based radio panel show, Off The Wire. By creating consistent paid television work for a number of comedians the show has helped grow the New Zealand comedy scene by showcasing local comic talent to the public, and helping the country outgrow its notorious "cultural cringe".

=== 48 Hours Film Festival ===
thedownlowconcept were the first group to win the New Zealand 48HOURS Film Festival twice, with short films Brown Peril (2007) and Only Son (2010). All films of the festival are to be conceived, written, shot, edited and delivered in 48 hours, with an unknown random genre, a character, a line of dialogue, and a prop, which is revealed at the start of the festival. Only Son later went on to win Best Screenplay and Best Short Film at the New Zealand Film and Television Awards 2010. It is the only 48 Hour film to ever have featured in the New Zealand Film Awards, let alone win it outright, beating films with government funding from the New Zealand Film Commission. Only Son was later picked up for distribution by the NZFC and was invited to Fantastic Fest in Austin, Texas amongst studio premieres.

=== Hounds ===
In 2012 thedownlowconcept produced their first scripted comedy series, Hounds. It won Best Comedy at the 2012 New Zealand Film and Television Awards, beating 7 Days, making it three years in a row that the company has been nominated in the category, winning it in the previous year for 7 Days. Despite the network not renewing the series, it remains one of the most critically acclaimed comedies ever produced in New Zealand.

== Controversy ==
=== "Headlights" music video ===
In 2009 New Zealand's national broadcaster TVNZ banned a music video made by thedownlowconcept for the possibility of breaching the Broadcasting Standards Authority code on the exploitation of children. The video was made for the song Headlights by 11 piece afro soul funk band "The Hot Grits". The video depicted preschoolers binge drinking milk as if it was alcohol and taking lollies and candy as if they were drugs. Lead vocalist Barnie Duncan said the idea for the video came from the production company, with the intention to "demonstrate the child-like greed with which adults conduct themselves whilst on the road to excess". Despite the removal of the video from circulation from both of TVNZ's networks, the clip was picked up by music television channels C4 and Juice TV, and went on to win the "Best Music Video" award, The Golden Jandal, at the New Zealand 2008 Handle the Jandal music video awards. The video was also the winner of the category of "Best use of exploitative tactics". The only other New Zealand music video that has been banned in the history of TVNZ is by The Skeptics, entitled AFFCO. The 1987 clip featured graphic footage of lambs being slaughtered.

=== Lundybainwatson ===
In 2012 thedownlowconcept courted controversy again with the naming of a greyhound Lundybainwatson in their series Hounds. The dog's name referred to convicted multiple murderers Mark Lundy, Scott Watson and David Bain. Bain was later acquitted after spending 13 years in jail following numerous appeals from lawyer Joe Karam resulting in his eventual release from prison in 2009. Before the series aired, promotional material came to the attention of Karam who complained to the network citing bad taste and potentially a defamation lawsuit.

The unintentional publicity stunt caused a minor stir when the producers called for suggestions on the Hounds Facebook page. At the behest of the network the production company re-shot and re-recorded audio in the few scenes where the dog's name was mentioned, renaming the dog Lundydixonwatson. Dixon referred to another controversial New Zealand murderer, Antonie Dixon. thedownlowconcept refused to be interviewed on the topic but released this statement, "We named the greyhound character (played by Flossie) after New Zealand's three most well-known, potentially wrongly accused men."

== Acclaim ==
"Auckland-based production company thedownlowconcept are as close to a Kiwi comedy hit factory as currently exists." - Lee Henaghan, The Nelson Mail

"Hounds, I believe, is the best Kiwi comedy show ever made." - Chris Schulz, The New Zealand Herald.

"Is Hounds the best Kiwi comedy ever? Yes." Chris Philpott, Stuff.co.nz

"They are gifted comic writers with great timing which is a rare gift. They have no fat in their work. Every second is great." - Ant Timpson, Flicks.co.nz

"Great performances, terrific writing and beautiful direction". - Josh Olson, Scoop.co.nz (on Only Son)

== Awards ==
Hounds - Best Comedy or Comedy Series - Won - New Zealand Film and Television Awards, 2012

7 Days - Best Comedy or Comedy Series - Won - New Zealand Film and Television Awards, 2011

Bigger, Better, Faster, Stronger - Best Constructed Reality Series - Nominated - New Zealand Film and Television Awards, 2011

7 Days - Best Comedy or Comedy Series - Nominated - New Zealand Film and Television Awards 2010

Only Son - Best Short Film - Won - New Zealand Film and Television Awards, 2010

Only Son - Best Short Film Screenplay - Won - New Zealand Film and Television Awards, 2010

== Production credits ==
=== Radio ===
- Off the Wire Radio New Zealand National
- The Late Night Adventures of Simon and Miles George FM
- You've Been a Great Audience Radio New Zealand National
- Pop! Goes the Weasel Channel Z and Kiwi FM
- The Cab Ride to Destiny RadioWorks
- Radio Station George FM

=== Television ===
- CoverBand (2014) TV One
- Best Bits (2013-) TV One
- Hounds (2012) TV3
- Bigger, Better, Faster, Stronger (2011) TV3
- 7 Days (2009–present) TV3
- Pop! Goes the Weasel Series 1 and 2 C4 & TV3

=== Film ===
- Gary of the Pacific (2017)
- Brown Peril : The Tim Porch Story (2006) - NZ 48 Hour Grand National Winner
- Water As A Metaphor (2008) - Red Bull "Reel Life" National Winner
- Only Son (2010) - NZ 48 Hour Grand National Winner
- Seed (2012) - NZ 48 Hour Auckland Finalist

== Gallery ==
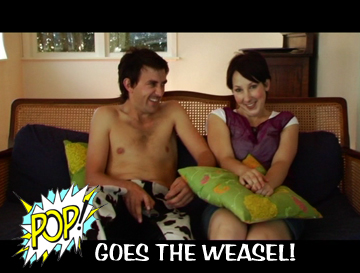
Pop! Goes the Weasel

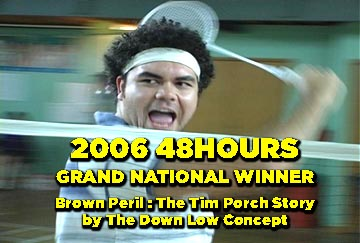
Brown Peril : The Tim Porch Story
