= Carolyn Henwood =

New Zealand judge

Dame Carolyn Henwood DNZM
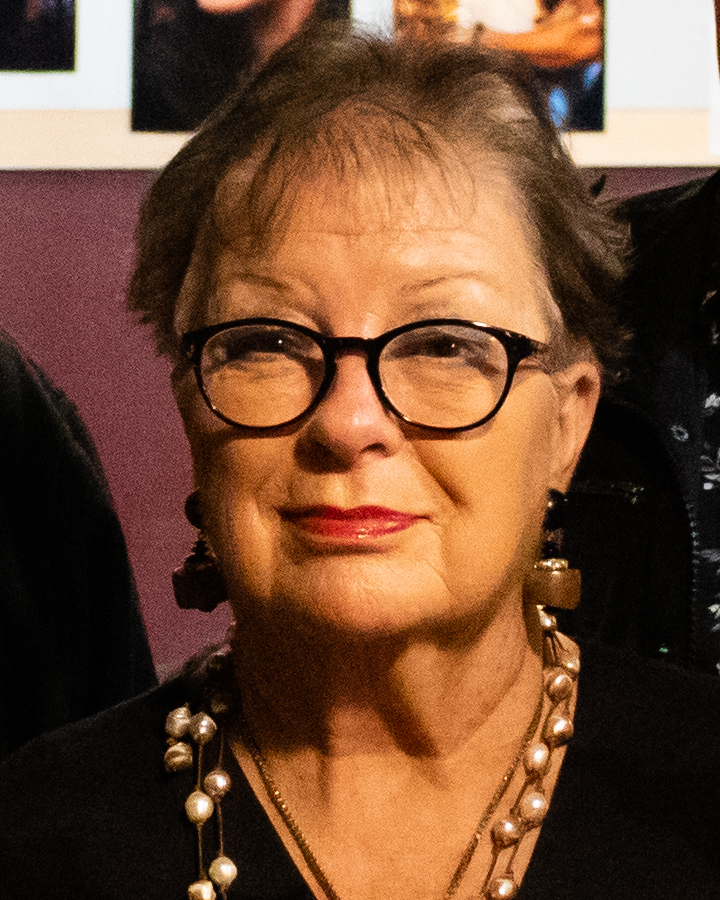
- Henwood in 2021

Judge of the District Court
- In office November 1985 – 21 June 2002

Personal details
- Born: Carolyn Griffiths; 19 September 1946 (age 80) Wellington, New Zealand
- Spouse: Ray Henwood (m. 1969; died 2019)
- Relatives: Dai Henwood (son)
- Education: Victoria University of Wellington
- Known for: First woman appointed to the judiciary in Wellington

Dame Carolyn Henwood DNZM (née Griffiths; born 19 September 1946) is a former District and Youth Court judge in New Zealand, and an advocate for youth justice and the welfare of children in state care. She is active in the arts, particularly theatre and was a founder of Circa Theatre in Wellington.

== Early life and family ==
Henwood was born Carolyn Griffiths in Wellington on 19 September 1946. She was educated at Queen Margaret College in Wellington, and graduated with a Bachelor of Laws from Victoria University of Wellington in 1971.

In 1969, she married actor Ray Henwood, and they had one son, television host and comedian Dai Henwood.

== Career ==
While a law student, Henwood worked as a law clerk at the Wellington firm of Buddle Anderson and Kent. In 1970, she moved to a smaller firm, Olphert and Bornholdt, where she undertook mainly commercial work, and was made a partner in the firm, which became known as Olphert, Wilson, Henwood and Perry, in 1975.

Henwood was appointed to the bench of the District Court in November 1985, becoming the first female judge of the District Court in Wellington and the third nationally. She was also a Youth Court judge. She has been a prominent advocate in youth justice issues and convened an international youth justice conference 'Youth Justice in Focus' in 1998. As a result of the conference the Youth Offending Strategy 2002 was developed; it was designed to target hard offenders and reduce reoffending. Henwood was appointed as a special advisor to the Te Hurihanga Youth Justice Programme, a residential programme aimed to prevent reoffending. The programme ran for three years before being cancelled by the government in 2010.

In 2004 she established the Henwood Trust to support strategies to reduce repeat youth offending and find alternatives to imprisonment. Aiming to protect children from violence, neglect and abuse the Trust drafted the Covenant for our Nation’s Children which was endorsed by a range of organisations, iwi and political parties in 2016.

From 2008 to 2015 Henwood was Chair of the Confidential Listening and Assistance Service, which heard allegations of historical abuse and neglect from adults who had been in state care before 1992. A panel chaired by Henwood made recommendations to the government on abuse in state care and in 2016 and 2019 she called for the government to set up an independent body to monitor the care of children.

Henwood, with her husband Ray Henwood and others including Susan Wilson and Ross Jolly, established Circa Theatre, a co–operative theatre company in 1976. She has continued to be active in the governance of Circa Theatre and was instrumental in getting a new theatre built on the Wellington waterfront adjacent to the national museum Te Papa Tongarewa. She was a founder of the Theatre Artists Charitable Trust, which obtains funding from sponsors for theatre companies and co-operatives in partnership with Circa and has been deputy chair of the board of Toi Whakaari, the New Zealand Drama School. She was also the inaugural chair and patron of the Queen Margaret College Foundation Trust.

== Honours and awards ==
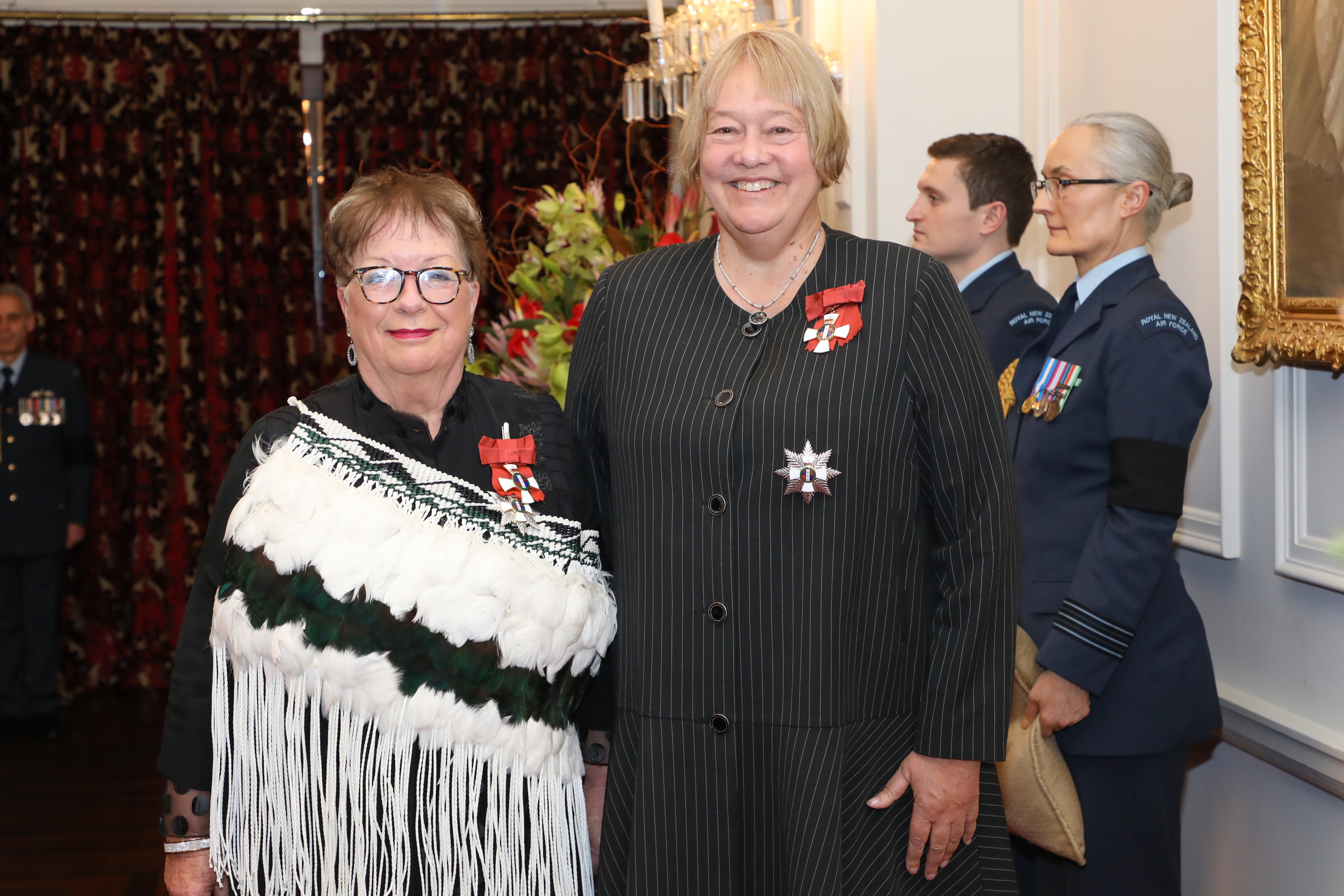
Henwood (left), after her investiture as a Dame Companion of the New Zealand Order of Merit by the administrator of the government, Dame Susan Glazebrook, at Government House, Wellington, on 13 September 2022

In 1990, Henwood was awarded the New Zealand 1990 Commemoration Medal. She was appointed a Companion of the New Zealand Order of Merit, for services as a District and Youth Court judge and to the arts, in the 2002 Queen's Birthday and Golden Jubilee Honours. She was made a Distinguished Alumni of Victoria University of Wellington in 2019. At the Wellington Theatre Awards in 2020 she received the Mayoral Significant Contribution to Theatre award. In the 2022 Queen's Birthday and Platinum Jubilee Honours, Henwood was promoted to Dame Companion of the New Zealand Order of Merit, for services to the State, youth and arts.

== Selected works ==
- Henwood, C., Stratford, S., Tindall Foundation and New Zealand Law Foundation. (2014) New Zealand's gift to the world: The youth justice family group conference; To tatou taonga: mai Aotearoa ki te ao. Wellington: The Henwood Trust.
- Henwood, C., George, J., Cram, F., Waititi, H. and Iwi Chairs Forum,. (2018). Rangatahi Māori and youth justice: Oranga Rangatahi: research undertaken for the Iwi Chairs with the support of the Henwood Trust and the Law Foundation. Wellington: Iwi Chairs Forum.
- Henwood, C. and Confidential Listening and Assistance Service (N.Z.). (2017). Some memories never fade: Final report of the Confidential Listening and Assistance Service 2015. Wellington, N.Z.: Dept. of Internal Affairs.
