= The Half-Light Symphony =

The Half Light Symphony (EP)

EP by Battle Circus
- Released: 2007
- Genre: Progressive rock, symphonic rock, dark cabaret
- Length: 42:38 / 57:54
- Label: Self-released

Battle Circus chronology
The Half Light Symphony (EP) (2007)	Battle Circus (2011)

Singles from Battle Circus
- 1. "Send in the Clones" Released: 7 June 2006; 2. "Utopium" Released: 8 February 2007; 3. "Love in a Fallout Shelter" Released: 1 November 2007

The Half-Light Symphony is the first EP by New Zealand progressive rock band Battle Circus. A concept record depicting mankind's transitional stages of existence following a cataclysmic nuclear disaster, the EP is divided into four distinct movements that provide a narrative for each part of the story. Throughout the New Zealand tour for the album the band would perform The Half-Light Symphony in its entirety, from start to finish.

The band commissioned renowned Japanese artist Ryohei Hase (www.ryoheihase.com) to create the artwork.

== Track listing ==
All tracks are written by Battle Circus.

CD Version
No.	Title	Length
1.	"First Movement: Anthem For A Doomed Youth"	11:15
2.	"Second Movement: Love In A Fallout Shelter"	10:16
3.	"Third Movement: Moonlight Nostalgia"	9:24
4.	"Fourth Movement: Mossman's Epoch"	11:43

Bonus Tracks (Download Version)
No.	Title	Length
5.	"Anthem For A Doomed Youth"	3:51
6.	"Love In A Fallout Shelter"	3:42
7.	"Utopium"	4:07
8.	"Send In The Clones"	3:26

== Personnel ==
Battle Circus

- Marcel Bellve – Vocals, Guitar
- Yvonne Wu – Piano
- Ryan Marshall – Bass
- James Whitlock – Drums, Percussion, Violin, Timpani

Additional Personnel

- David Holmes – Production, Mixing, Mastering
- Chris Winchcombe – Mastering
- Miriam Robinson – French Horn
- Lloyd de Beer – Violin
- Warwick Robinson – Viola
- Steve Litherland – Cello
