= Kiwi FM =

- Auckland, Wellington and Christchurch; New Zealand
- Frequency: 102.1–102.5 MHz FM

Programming
- Format: Independent New Zealand music

Ownership
- Owner: MediaWorks New Zealand
- Sister stations: List of sister stations: George FM; Mai FM; Magic; More FM; Radio Live; The Breeze; The Edge; The Rock; The Sound

History
- First air date: 19 August 1996 (as Channel Z); 6 February 2005 (as Kiwi FM)
- Last air date: 31 March 2015; 11 years ago

Kiwi FM (formerly Channel Z) was a New Zealand alternative music radio network. From 1996 to 2005, as Channel Z, it broadcast alternative and local music for a youth-oriented market. From 2005 to 2015, as Kiwi FM, it broadcast predominantly New Zealand independent music, to showcase local music across a wide range of genres and enable greater access to an international market for local contemporary artists. The station broadcast in Auckland, Wellington and Christchurch on FM frequencies and globally through an internet stream. During its later years it operated as a non-profit subsidiary of MediaWorks New Zealand, and was affiliated with XFM and Triple J.

== History ==
=== Channel Z ===
Channel Z began as a modern rock and alternative rock radio station with a youth to adult demographic in Wellington from 19 August 1996, expanding to Auckland in 1997 and Christchurch in 1999. Channel Z was named after The B-52's song of the same name, and played a vital role in lynchpinning alternative NZ and international artists other stations claimed were too "dangerous" to play. John Diver was the station's first programme director and Martin Devlin, John Diver, James Coleman, and Olivia Sinclair-Thomson were among the station's earliest presenters. The station was part of the More FM group of stations. The group in turn became part of CanWest-owned Global Radio, which later became RadioWorks.

In 1998, longtime presenter Pheobe Spiers and breakfast hosts Jon Bridges and Nathan Rarere joined the station. In 1999, under network programme director Roger Clamp and Global Radio chief executive Brent Impey, the station changed to a less alternative format. Former programme director John Diver and fellow DJ Olivia Sinclair-Thomson resigned in protest. It received a mixed response from listeners. The network expanded to Christchurch in August 1999, with Willy Macalister presenting a local daytime show and Melanie Wise presenting a night show alongside the national network programme. The new station was launched with a concert featuring Stellar*, Living End, Zed and Tadpole.

In 2001, local shows in Wellington and Christchurch were abolished in favour of networked programming, Jon and Nathan's breakfast show was replaced with a James Coleman breakfast show, and Martyn Bradbury and Clarke Gayford moved from Nights to Drive. The station's frequencies were reallocated from 94.2 to 93.8 in Auckland and 91.7 to 94.7 in Wellington, while it remained on 99.3 in Christchurch. In 2003, the station's breakfast show was cancelled. The 94.2 frequency in Auckland was used to launch The Edge and Channel Z was moved to a lower powered 93.8 frequency. The station's ratings fell, but improved when the transmitter was relocated to the Sky Tower from its previous position on Waiheke Island and gained a higher-powered frequency.

Channel Z released four compilation albums based on listener polls and staff selections: Channel Z: the Best of Volume One, Channel Z: Up Loud!, Channel Z: the Best of Volume Two, and Channel Z: the Best of Volume Three. It also released a compilation of live recordings, Coleman Sessions: recorded live at York Street. All the compilations featured New Zealand bands.

=== Kiwi FM ===
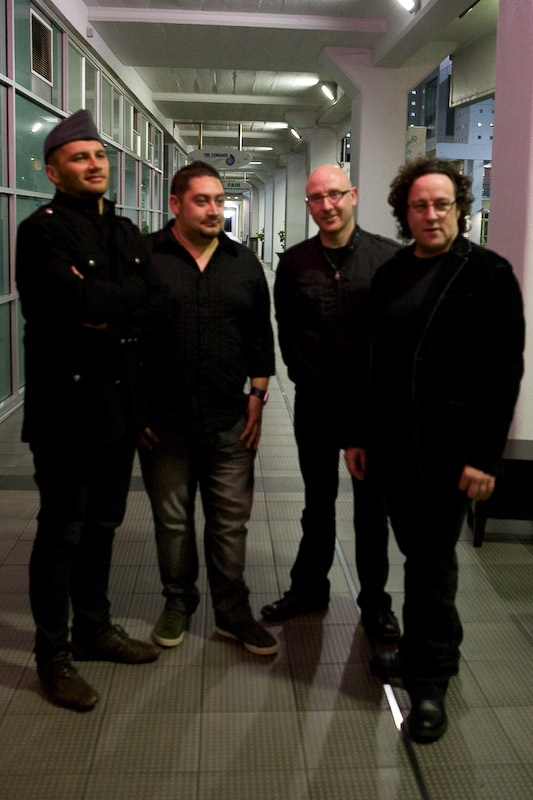
Jason Kerrison, far left, was one of Kiwi FM's first hosts.

The station Kiwi FM was launched on Waitangi Day, 6 February 2005 and was opened with a speech by then-Prime Minister Helen Clark. It was created to replace alternative station Channel Z which had failed to deliver on its ratings.

The initial station ran for around a year and was re-branded in July 2006 when legendary New Zealand music journalist Karyn Hay stepped in as General Manager with Andrew Fagan as music director. On 1 May 2006, the New Zealand Government granted Kiwi FM access to new FM frequencies, under an agreement that kept the 100-percent Kiwi music station on the airwaves. Then broadcasting minister Steve Maharey said the station had been granted the use of three FM frequencies for an initial period of one year, during which time it would work towards becoming a not-for-profit organisation. As part of the agreement to use the frequencies, the station's brief was to be to significantly expand its content to include a greater range of New Zealand music.

The new organizational structure for Kiwi FM was rather unusual: it was set up as a partnership between Government Ministries for Broadcasting and Economic Development and listed media company MediaWorks. The new network was implemented in less than three months, launching on 17 July 2006 with a number of respected staff members - including Opshop frontman Jason Kerrison, the Twitch lead vocalist Fleur Jack, former student radio breakfast hosts Wallace Chapman and Glenn 'Wammo' Williams, actress Danielle Cormack, Blindspott frontman Damian Alexander, The Bads' vocalist Dianne Swann, and former Mockers and Lig frontman Andrew Fagan.

In February 2012 Kiwi FM changed their playlist to play 40% international artists while still playing 60% New Zealand artists. The international artists include alternative artists that don't normally get airplay on commercial radio, similar to the New Zealand music already played. On Friday 20 March 2015 MediaWorks announced the decision to shut down Kiwi FM on midnight 31 March, with parent company MediaWorks New Zealand choosing to focus instead on "dance music and hip hop".

== Channel Z revival attempts ==
An online petition and forum to bring back the Channel Z format, called Bring Back Channel Z, ran for about a year. The campaign was featured in Rip It Up, with a letter from petition co-founder Jonathon Kerkhofs. The magazine was largely skeptical of the potential success of the website giving it as much chance of success as "a Pop Idol winner has at a second album deal". In the same issue Bradbury, who was at the time editor of Rip it Up, cited the need for a station such as channel Z to support the New Zealand music industry. He claimed "Channel Z served an important role between the Student Radio Network and the commercial stations" and that with it gone "New Zealand music is going to find it a much harder place to get heard". The petition has attracted over 1400 signatures, far short of its goal of 10,000.

On Monday 18 January 2010 a version of the Channel Z format was brought back on radio station The Rock. From 7PM to 10PM The Rock aired Channel Z Nights based on the modern rock format similar to that of Channel Z in the early 2000s. The show failed mostly due to the music being similar to the rest of the days music played on The Rock, and not adhering to Channel Z format. The show was canned a week before Christmas the same year. Both The Rock and Channel Z had come under the same ownership in 2001 when Channel Z owner Canwest purchased RadioWorks with all stations eventually falling under the same management umbrella.

The modern day radio station Channel X plays similar music to what was previously played on Channel Z, playing much of the alternative music originally played on the station.

== Other Kiwi FMs ==
In 1988 in the Waikato and Bay of Plenty a local station called 898 FM was renamed to Kiwi FM broadcasting on 89.8 FM. The Kiwi FM station played Hit Music similar to Magic 91FM in Auckland and ZM. In 1993 Kiwi FM was rebranded as The Breeze but this station was completely separate to the current The Breeze station both in the Waikato and even the original The Breeze station in Wellington, a similar station was launched in Auckland replacing Magic 91FM. In 1997 this frequency was taken over by The Radio Network and used to launch ZM into the Waikato and Bay of Plenty.

In Te Puke a local station called 92.9 Kiwi FM and then for a short period known as Kiwi 89FM operated. This station was independently owned and operated by Whakatāne-based station One Double X - 1XX from September 2001 to May 2011.

In 2021 Kiwiradio.nz and Kiwiradio.co.nz online radio was established to carry the torch for New Zealand Music discovery, and has a weekly live show that invites local artists to showcase their music.

== Programmes ==
=== As Channel Z ===
The Dick 84 Brekkie with Nathan Rarere and Jon Bridges took the breakfast slot from 1998 to early 2003, while James Coleman hosted the Coleman Breakfast Programme from 2003 until the station closed in early 2005. Local programming played during the daytime slot, until a nationwide day show with Phoebe Spiers was launched in mid-2001.

The James Coleman Radio Programme played on weekday afternoons and in particular featuring a regular segment where, live on air, Coleman would telephone an elevator in central Wellington, and pretend to be a representative from Schindler's Lifts (an elevator service company), usually causing confusion for the elevator users. Martyn Bradbury and Clarke Gayford hosted a syndicated night show in 2001 and 2002, replaced Coleman in the drive show in 2003.

Other local and specialist programming aired during night and weekend slots. Riot!, a punk show, aimed to break through new punk/alternative punk acts from overseas and New Zealand. Talkback with Bomber, a left-leaning youth-oriented Sunday night talkback show with Martyn Bradbury, was broadcast for most of Channel Z's life. Comedian, musician and Flight of the Conchords band member Jemaine Clement worked for the station in the late 1990s, and won New Zealand Radio Awards for his work.

=== As Kiwi FM ===
Until its closure, Kiwi FM used digital media to archive and catalogue shows for international audiences.

Former presenters include Opshop frontman Jason Kerrison, The Twitch lead vocalist Fleur Jack, former student radio breakfast hosts Wallace Chapman and Glenn 'Wammo' Williams, actress Danielle Cormack, Blindspott frontman Damian Alexander, The Bads vocalist Dianne Swann, former The Mockers frontman Andrew Fagan, Karyn Hay, Goodshirt frontman Rodney Fisher, Angelina Boyd, Sam Collins, Mikee Tucker, Phoebe Spiers, Nathan Muller, Charlotte Ryan, Dylan Cherry and Dan Clist.

Flagship specialist shows included: The Lounge, A Kiwi Abroad, Voices from the Wilderness, High Noon Tea, The New Zealand Electronic Show, Songs From The Backyard, Resurrection Selection and many more over Kiwi FM's lifetime devoted to showcasing certain aspects of Kiwi music and culture.

The last song played on Kiwi FM was Chris Knox's Not Given Lightly.

== Broadcasting ==
Before its closure, Kiwi FM broadcast on FM frequencies in New Zealand's three major centres. These were given back to the Government when the network closed.

- Auckland - Sky Tower 102.2 FM
- Wellington - Fitzherbert Kaukau 102.1 FM
- Christchurch - Sugarloaf 102.5 FM

== Albums ==
=== Channel Z: the Best of Volume One ===
Shihad (briefly known as Pacifier) was featured on four of the five Channel Z compilation albums. Channel Z: the Best of Volume One was a compilation of popular tracks in 2000. The first CD included "Change (In the House of Flies)" by Deftones, "Last Resort" by Papa Roach, "Heaven Is a Halfpipe" by OPM, "Generator" by Foo Fighters, "Alright" by Tadpole, "Sucker" by 28 Days, "99 Red Balloons" by Goldfinger, "Calling On" by Weta, "Mudshovel" by Staind, "Southtown" by P.O.D., "Please Bleed" by Ben Harper, "Johnny" by Salmonella Dub, "Freshmint!" by Regurgitator, "Green" by Goodshirt, "Now" by Fur Patrol, "Comfortably Shagged" by HLAH, "American Bad Ass" by Kid Rock, and "Bodyrock" by Moby.

The second CD includes "Make Me Bad" by Korn, "Pardon Me" by Incubus, "Pacifier" by Shihad, "My Own Worst Enemy" by Lit, "Penguins & Polarbears" by Millencolin, "Bullet in my Hand" by Slim, "Mary" by Supergrass, "Empty Head" by Betchadupa, "Baggy Trousers" by Dark Tower, "What You Do (Bastard)" by Stellar*, "The Best Things" by Filter, "Waffle" by Sevendust, "I'm with Stupid" by Static-X, "Who am I" by Wash, "Super Breakdown" by Sprung Monkey, "Ready 1" by Grinspoon, "Out of Control" by the Chemical Brothers, and "Build It Up, Tear It Down" by Fatboy Slim.

=== Channel Z: Up Loud! ===
Channel Z: Up Loud! is a compilation album released in 2001. The main disc included "Flavour of the Weak" by American Hi-Fi, "Your Disease" by Saliva, "Fat Lip" by Sum 41, "My Generation" by Limp Bizkit, "Man Overboard" by Blink 182, "Good Fortune" by PJ Harvey, "My Happiness" by Powderfinger, "Hanging By a Moment" by Lifehouse, "Duck and Run" by 3 Doors Down, "Counting The Days" By Goldfinger, "Between Angels and Insects" by Papa Roach, "The Lost Art of Keeping a Secret" by Queens of the Stoneage, "Hit or Miss" by New Found Glory and "Movies" by Alien Ant Farm. New Zealand tracks include "Funny Boy" by Rubicon, "Labourer" by Marystaple, "Blowing Dirt" by Goodshirt and "Drivers Side" by Zed.

The album included a bonus disc, featuring "What a Day" by Nonpoint, "Wrecking Ball" by Creeper Lagoon, "Sometimes" by Ours, "No One" by Cold, "Slow" by Professional Murder Music, and "Low" by New Zealand band Slim.

=== Channel Z: the Best of Volume Two ===
Channel Z: the Best of Volume Two was a compilation of listener favourites in 2001. New Zealand tracks included "Just Like Everybody Else" by Shihad, "Push on Thru" by Salmonella Dub, "Bruce" by Rubicon, "King Kong" by Voom, "Streets Don't Close" by Sommerset, "Real World" by Slim, "Nil By Mouth" by Blindspott, "Astronaut" by The Feelers, "Better Days 2001 Remix" by Tadpole, "Snapshot" by Weta, "Andrew" by Fur Patrol, "Blowing Dirt" by Goodshirt, and "Awake" by Betchadupa.

The first CD also included "Papercut" by Linkin Park, "Alive" with P.O.D., "Back to School" by Deftones, "Drive" by Incubus, "Waiting" by Green Day, "What's That You Say" by Sprung Monkey, "Hash Pipe" by Weezer, "Promise" by Eve 6, "Bohemian Like You" by The Dandy Warhols, "Teenage Dirtbag" by Wheatus, and "Fat Cop" by Regurgitator. The second CD also included "Bodies" by Drowning Pool, "Speed Kills" by Bush, "Sometimes" by Ash, "When It's Over" by Sugar Ray, "Crystal" by New Order, "Hollywood Bitch" by Stone Temple Pilots, "Control" by Puddle of Mudd, "Rip It Up" by 28 Days, and "Gravity" by The Superjesus.

=== Channel Z: the Best of Volume Three ===
P.O.D. featured on three of the five Channel Z compilation albums. Channel Z: the Best of Volume Three was another CD of listener favourites, compiled in 2003. The first disc contained "Pts.OF.Athrty" by Linkin Park, "Boom" by P.O.D., "Prayer" by Disturbed, "Chemical Heart" by Grinspoon, "Envy" by Ash, "The Taste of Ink" by The Used, "Girl All the Bad Guys Want" by Bowling For Soup, "I'd Do Anything" by Simple Plan, "Cosmopolitan Blood Loss" by Glassjaw, "Rock Star" by N.E.R.D. and "Carry on" by Motor Ace. The disc featured New Zealand tracks "Comfort me" by Pacifier, "Pitiful" by Blindside, "Green" by Goodshirt and "Drop D" by Betchadupa.

The second disc included "Running Away" by Hoobastank, "Where Do We Go from Here" by Filter, "Hate to Say I Told You So" by The Hives, "Alright Alright (Here's My Fist Where's the Fight?)" by Sahara Hotnights, "Poem" by Taproot, "The Energy" by Audiovent, "Up All Night" by Unwritten Law, "Walk Away" by Epidemic, "Long Grass" by Pan Am, "For Nancy ('Cos It Already Is)" by Pete Yorn, and "60 Miles an Hour" by New Order. Featured New Zealand tracks included "Room to Breathe" by Blindspott, "Exit to the City" by The D4, "Sing the Night Away" by Steriogram, and "Condition Chronic" by Tadpole.

=== Coleman Sessions: recorded live at York Street ===
Coleman Sessions: recorded live at York Street was a compilation of live on-air performances by New Zealand bands, recorded at York Street Studio in Auckland CBD and released in 2003. It included "Run" by Pacifier, "The Xpedition" by P-Money, "Green" by Goodshirt, "Long Grass" by Pan Am, "Nothing New" by Tadpole, "Nirvana" by Elemeno P, "Clutter" by Sommerset, "Shift" by Eight, "Probably Feel Alright" by Splitter, "Enemy" by Jester, "Astronaut" by The Feelers, "Ain't That Bad" by Cassette, "Stick With It" by Pluto, "Staring at the Ocean" by Heavy Jones Trio, "Describing Song" by Goldenhorse, "Beaten Again" by Pine, and "Coming Back Home" by The Black Seeds.

New Zealand Herald writer Russell Baillie described the album as a mix of "established names", "up and comers" and "unfamiliar gems". He said he was disappointed Pacifier was the only band who tried an acoustic performance and new ways to perform their material. He wrote that James Coleman, then "one of the towering talents on TV3's The Panel", could be heard on the album as "he drapes himself about the place in the artwork". SmokeCDS reviewers Brent Gleave and Shaun Peyman said "as live recordings, the album works well, with good sound quality yet retaining the raw clarity and immediacy of live performance".
