= Lego Masters (New Zealand TV series) =

New Zealand reality TV series

- Genre: Reality
- Presented by: Dai Henwood
- Judges: Robin Sather
- Country of origin: New Zealand
- Original language: English
- No. of seasons: 2
- No. of episodes: 18

Production
- Running time: 60 mins (including ads)
- Production company: Screentime New Zealand

Original release
- Network: TVNZ
- Release: 9 May 2022 – 26 April 2023

Lego Masters is a New Zealand reality television show based on the British series of the same name in which teams compete to build the best Lego project. It is hosted by Dai Henwood and judged by Lego Certified Professional Robin Sather. The series premiered on 9 May 2022 on TVNZ 2. Unlike other versions of Lego Masters, six teams compete instead of eight.

A second season was produced which premiered on 10 April 2023.

== Series overview ==
Series	Episodes	Originally released		Winning team	Prize
Series	Episodes	First released	Last released	Winning team	Prize
1	9	9 May 2022	6 June 2022	Glenn & Jake	$25,000 to spend at The Warehouse and two Fiat Lounge cars
2	9	10 April 2023	26 April 2023	Oli & Charlie	$25,000 to spend at The Warehouse and two Fiat Lounge cars

== Season details ==
=== Season 1 (2022) ===
The first season aired on 9 May 2022 and ended on 6 June 2022. The season was won by Glenn and Jake, who received $25,000 to spend at The Warehouse and two Fiat Lounge cars.

Team	Status
Glenn & Jake	Winners
Emily & Sarah	Runners-up
Jono & Dan	Eliminated (Challenge 9)
Andrew & Georgie	Eliminated (Challenge 8)
Amy & Adam	Eliminated (Challenge 5)
Emily & Liam	Eliminated (Challenge 3)

=== Season 2 (2023) ===
The second season began airing on 10 April 2023 and ended on 26 April 2023. The season was won by Oli and Charlie, who received $25,000 to spend at The Warehouse and two Fiat Lounge cars.

Team	Status
Oli & Charlie	Winners
Andrew & Harry	Runners-up
Carsten & Angus	Eliminated (Challenge 9)
Rachel & Jason	Eliminated (Challenge 8)
Amy & Llewe	Eliminated (Challenge 5)
Henny & Pieter	Eliminated (Challenge 3)
