= Ray Henwood =

Welsh-born New Zealand actor (1937–2019)

Ray Henwood ONZM
- Born: Charles Raymond Henwood; 15 January 1937; Swansea, Wales
- Died: 26 August 2019 (aged 82); Wellington, New Zealand
- Occupation: Actor
- Relatives: Dai Henwood (son)

Charles Raymond Henwood ONZM (15 January 1937 – 26 August 2019) was a Welsh-born New Zealand actor. He was married to district court judge Carolyn Henwood, and was the father of New Zealand comedian Dai Henwood.

Born in Swansea, Wales, on 15 January 1937, Henwood emigrated to New Zealand at the age of 25, and became a naturalised New Zealander in 1977. In 1962, Henwood was appointed to the staff of Mana College in Porirua, teaching science and mathematics there for four years. He then joined the Department of Scientific and Industrial Research (DSIR) as a toxicologist and helped to introduce the breathalyser. In 1971, he published a book on drug use in New Zealand, A Turned On World, that was critical of the Narcotics Act (1965), describing the Act as "using a cannon to kill flies".

Henwood was one of the founding members of Circa Theatre and kept contributing to Circa until his death. He appeared in numerous film and television roles, and was likely best known for his role as office worker Hugh in television sitcom Gliding On. In the 2006 Queen's Birthday Honours, Henwood was appointed an Officer of the New Zealand Order of Merit, for services to film and the theatre.

Henwood died in Wellington on 26 August 2019, aged 82.

== Selected filmography ==
- Opening Night (1977, TV Movie) – Clem Smith
- The John Sullivan Story (1979, TV Movie) – Colonel Smythe
- Should I Be Good? (1985) – Peter Chartwell
- Hot Target (1985) – Douglas Maxwell
- The End of the Golden Weather (1991) – Reverend Thirle
- Heavenly Creatures (1994) – Professor
- The Lord of the Rings: The Fellowship of the Ring (2001) – Council Man (uncredited)
- Second Hand Wedding (2008) – Desmond Daney
- Separation City (2009) – Registrar
- The Hobbit: The Desolation of Smaug (2013) – Old Fisherman
- Xena: Warrior Princess (1995) - Secrus
