= Live and Let Dai =

2024 documentary series

- Genre: Documentary series
- Starring: Dai Henwood
- Country of origin: New Zealand
- Original language: English
- No. of seasons: 1
- No. of episodes: 3

Production
- Executive producers: Dai Henwood, Hayley Cunningham, Andrew Szusterman & Kelly Martin
- Producer: Charlotte Hobson
- Editor: Justin Hawkes
- Running time: 44 minutes
- Production company: South Pacific Pictures

Original release
- Network: Three
- Release: 30 September – 2 October 2024

Live and Let Dai is a three-part documentary series following New Zealand comedian and television presenter Dai Henwood as he navigates life with incurable bowel cancer. The documentary series was Directed by Justin Hawkes and produced by South Pacific Pictures.

The series premiered on Three and their streaming platform ThreeNow on 30 September 2024, with episodes broadcast over three nights.

== Production ==
Live and Let Dai was produced by South Pacific Pictures. Directed by Justin Hawkes. The series received funding from NZ On Air.

The series documents comedian Dai Henwood's experiences following his diagnosis with metastatic bowel cancer in 2020, including his ongoing medical treatment and the effects of his illness on his personal and professional life. Filming also follows Henwood as he continues performing stand-up comedy and explores his interest in spirituality.

The documentary includes a journey to Japan, where Henwood participates in a spiritual ceremony in the mountains as part of his exploration of mortality and acceptance.

Ahead of its release, Henwood described making the documentary as a cathartic and confronting experience, while also providing an opportunity to share aspects of his personal life that he had rarely discussed publicly.

Henwood died from bowel cancer in Auckland, on 10 November 2026, aged 48.

== Release ==
The series aired on 30 September 2024 on Three and their streaming platform ThreeNow.

In May 2026, Live and Let Dai won a Gold Tower in the Documentary – Biography/Profiles category at the New York Festivals TV & Film Awards.

== Reception ==
Live and Let Dai received positive reviews from New Zealand television critics.

The Spinoff praised the documentary's emotional honesty and its exploration of mortality, family relationships and resilience. They highlighted Henwood's use of humour alongside his willingness to discuss his illness and personal experiences openly.

In December 2024, The Spinoff included Live and Let Dai in its retrospective of the year's most memorable New Zealand television moments, describing the documentary as a deeply personal account of Henwood's experience living with stage-four cancer.
