= Radio Bay of Plenty =

Media Bay of Plenty
- Whakatāne; New Zealand
- Frequency: 90.5fm

Programming
- Format: Adult hits

History
- First air date: 1971

Technical information
- Class: Terrestrial/Internet
- Transmitter coordinates: 37.953544°S 176.991313°E

Links
- Webcast: 1XX webcast Bayrock webcast
- Website: 1XX official website Bayrock official website

Media Bay of Plenty is a radio company based in Whakatāne, New Zealand. Its flagship station, One Double X, reaches the entire Bay of Plenty, with a specific frequency in Ōhope and live streams on its website. It also owns and operates subsidiary networks Bayrock and Q97 Beats.

The New Zealand radio market is mostly consolidated into large nationwide networks with powerful brands and limited local content. Media Bay of Plenty produces independent local programming and news coverage for the Bay of Plenty with a specific focus on the eastern and central part of the region. The stations carry and contributes to national news bulletins produced by NZME Radio through Newstalk ZB.

One Double X began broadcasting to the Eastern Bay Of Plenty on 1240 kHz at 10:30 am on 30 June 1971. The original company name was Radio Whakatane but changed to Radio Bay Of Plenty in 1978 when the station's AM frequency also changed to 1242 kHz. In the mid-late 1970s 1XX 1240 was also known on air from time to time as Coastline Radio, Coastline One 24, Coastline 1-2-4, One 24 Double X or Coastline Double X. 1XX began broadcasting on 90.5 MHz at 12:12:12 pm on 12 December 1988. In 2023 Radio Bay of Plenty became Media Bay of Plenty to reflect the change in media and the incorporation of video and podcasts.

== History ==
=== 1971-1982 ===
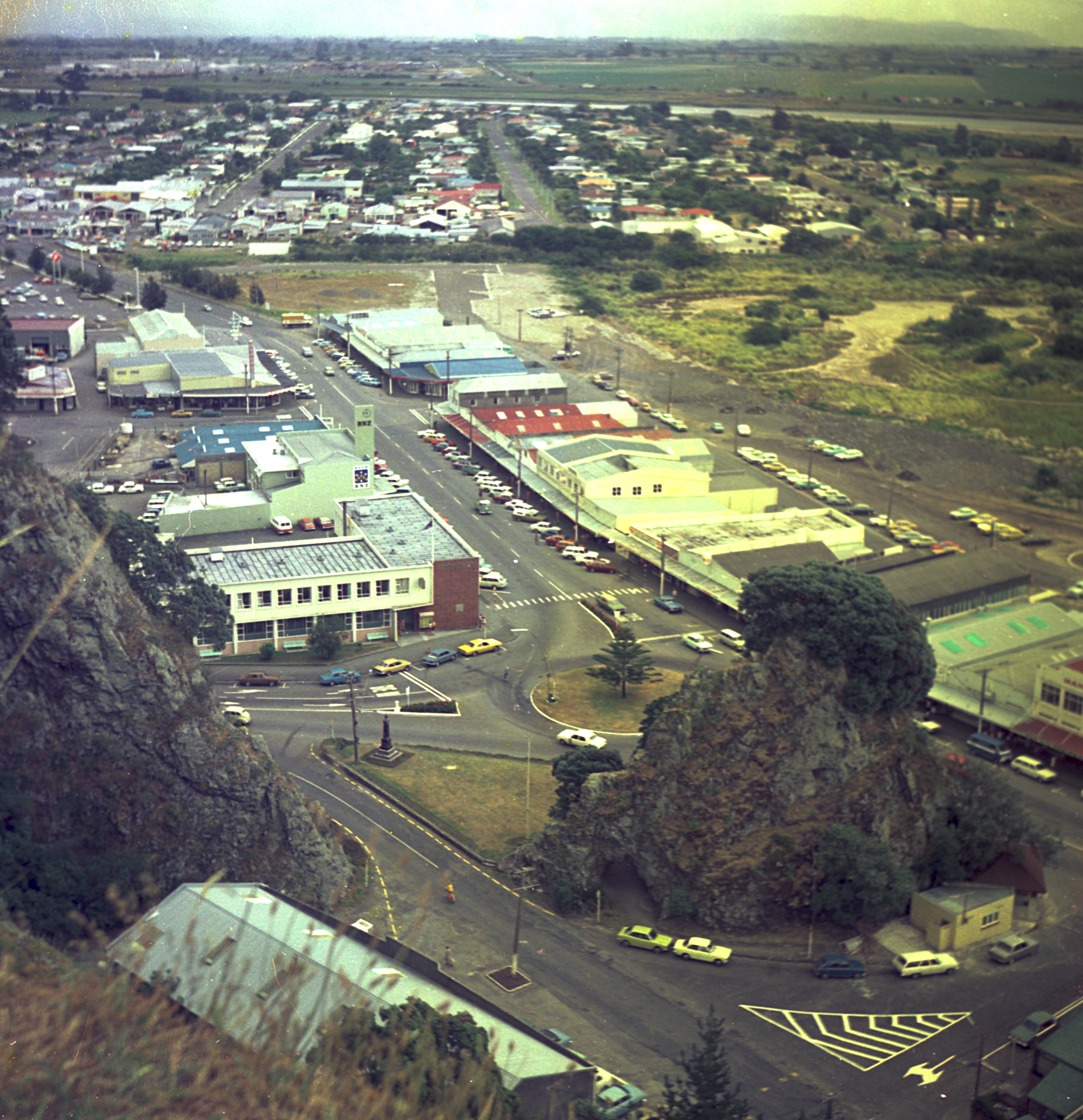
The Strand in Whakātane, about four years after the station started in 1971.

The idea of a locally based and privately owned Eastern Bay of Plenty station was first floated in 1969, prompted by the efforts of pirate station Radio Hauraki, broadcasting to Auckland from boats in the Hauraki Gulf. One Double X was granted a broadcasting license in 1970, with the 1 in the call-sign signifying the upper North Island location, the first X representing private ownership and the second X chosen by the station. Its original slogan included the words "from the Eastern Bay of Plenty, wherever you may go, the entertainment's better when you dial 1 2 4 0".

Broadcasting Minister H.J. Walker officially opened the station at 10.30am on Wednesday 30 June 1971. It initially broadcast 19.5 hours of live original local content from 5.00am to 12.30am each day with additional 24-hour licences granted during some summer holiday seasons. The station was not allowed to broadcast advertising on Sundays and did all its own local and international news and sports reporting. It gave away one of the country's first colour televisions in a contest in 1974. It was also the feature of a television documentary in July 1977.

=== 1982-1987 ===
In January 1982 1XX ran a short term station as the first FM stereo radio station in New Zealand, under the name FM 90.7. It ran from 5 January until 31 January 1982, and over the summer of 1982 to 1983. It was only on the air from 16:00 to midnight and outside these broadcast times the station was simply off the air, as 1XX was not allowed to broadcast their programme on this FM frequency. The programme was completely separate to the 1XX programme that continued to broadcast on AM, and 1XX did not begin permanently broadcasting on FM until 1988.

The station only operated during the late afternoon and evenings from 4pm to midnight operating 2 shifts. Each night of the week FM 90.7 would play a different format programme to cater to different audiences. Monday was country music, Tuesday was album rock, Wednesdays were classical music, Thursdays were jazz music and Fridays were rock music and soul music. On Saturdays, top 40 music got its first play on FM radio in New Zealand, while Sundays were dedicated to big band music and "beautiful music".

=== 1987-2001 ===
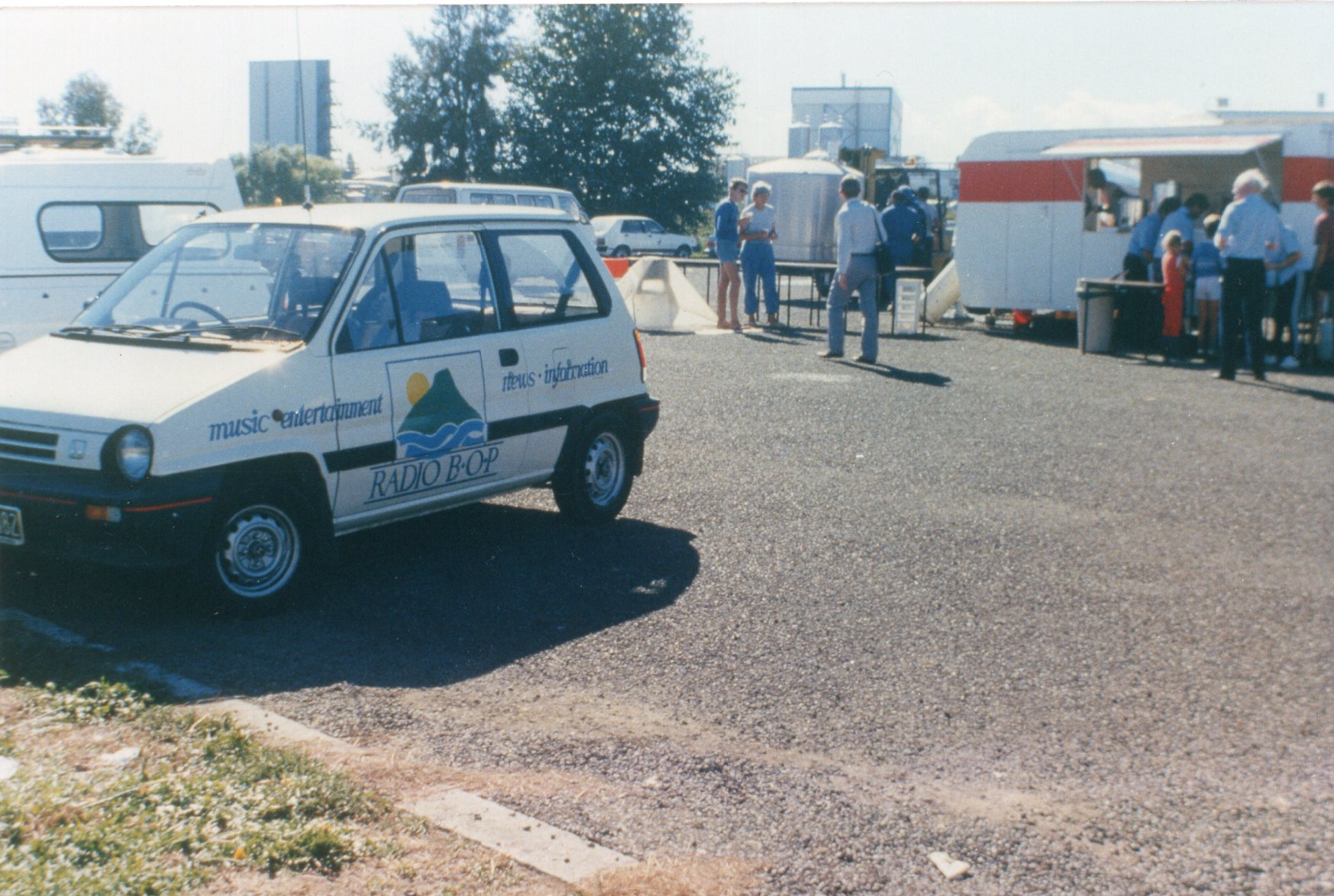
A parked Radio Bay of Plenty car in 1987, following the Edgecumbe earthquake

One Double X became a major source of information for Bay of Plenty residents during the 1987 Edgecumbe earthquake. Local newsreader Chris Bullen provided an initial report on 2 March that "a series of what the D.S.I.R. describes as major earthquakes have hit the Eastern Bay of Plenty this afternoon". The station was taken off-air for 30 to 40 minutes due to a landline disconnection, but a radio link allowed the station to get back on air. Announcer Cliff Stockwell and newsreader Chris Bullen hosted around-the-clock coverage, while outdoor broadcast equipment allowed staff to provide live updates from the Civil Defence bases in Whakatāne, Kawerau and Edgecumbe. A similar approach was taken to reporting a mini tornado in Whakatāne later that year.

In Summer 1987/1988 1XX ran another summer FM station from Ōhope – 93 Splash FM. Splash FM began broadcasting in December 1987 and ran to May 1988. The Splash FM programme was simulcast on 1XX between 7pm and 6am the next morning while Splash FM was on the air. During this time the Rock N Roll 500 was played. In Summer 1991-1992 99.3 Moro FM was also run from Ōhope by 1XX, under sponsorship from Moro chocolate bar manufacturer Cadbury. The 1XX programme was played on Cadbury Moro FM between 11pm and 6am the next morning.

The complete transition to FM broadcasting was made on 12 December 1988. Announcer Terry Casserly had to ad-lib during the opening broadcast, when a live cross to company chairman Ross Neiderer was lost to dead air. The 90.5 FM from Mount Putauaki was the most powerful FM signal in the Bay of Plenty and was used as the station's main frequency, with a simulcast on the station's previous AM frequency. Another frequency on 93.0 FM was used to relay 1XX in Ōhope from Waitangi Day 4 February 1989.

=== 2001- ===
In September 2001 Radio 1XX started a small local station in Te Puke called 92.9 Kiwi FM as a short term station for the annual Kiwifruit Festival, the station went back on the air in September 2002 and 2003. A local breakfast show was broadcast to Te Puke residents between 6 am and 10 am and outside these times the 1XX programme was played. The station reached Puke, Tauranga, Mount Maunganui, Rotorua and Matata and was not related to Kiwi FM network stations operated by MediaWorks New Zealand.

In November 2004 92.9 Kiwi FM extended to round-the-year broadcasting, with local programming 6am-6pm Monday–Friday and 6am–10am Saturday. Outside this time the 1XX programme was simulcast. Kiwi FM changed frequency to 89.0FM in early 2011 but shut down local operations on 27 May 2011 and now broadcasts the 1XX programme 24/7.

Station founder Debbie Chote said the station was "all about the positives, we just don't talk negative" and was all about making people smile. She put the closure down the economic climate reducing demand for advertising, and said the station was no longer commercially viable and the closure was "a sign of the times". The closure was also met with disappointment from local businesses that had advertised on the station.

== Stations ==
=== One Double X ===
This is the logo of One Double X.

One Double X is an adult hits radio station in Whakatāne. It reaches the entire Bay of Plenty, with specific frequencies Ōhope and live streaming on its website. As the flagship network of Media Bay of Plenty, it reaches the entire Bay of Plenty. It is heard throughout the region on 90.5 MHz & 1242 kHz, at Ōhope on 92.9 MHz and also streams on the web through the station's website.

The station’s breakfast show is hosted by LJ Dobbin and includes news, upbeat music, competitions and local information relating to the Eastern Bay of Plenty. The Day Show is presented by Rebecca Young and includes interviews, community events, a Top 20 Countdown of country music and news updates. The Drive Show is hosted by Renee Dekkers and includes community updates, fun facts of the day and Driving Home The Music.

The network carries and contributes to national news bulletins produced by NZME Radio through Newstalk ZB. 1XX still operates as a completely local radio station today. One Double X is the emergency broadcaster for much of the Bay of Plenty, with sirens and civil defence services encouraging people to tune into the station for emergency information. In 2013, the station had to respond to a false alarm that prompted several people to listen to station or contact the studio for more information.

Radio 1XX has a regional news room, delivering local news throughout the day.

=== Bayrock ===
Bayrock is an album rock format radio station, broadcasting throughout the Bay Of Plenty on 93.7 MHz and at Ōhope on 100.1 MHz, with an additional frequency in Wānaka in the South Island on 93.0 MHz. It also streams online. Its programming includes Bayrock Breakfast with Jonsey, a Bayrock Workday themed show, a drive show, the Bayrock Hard Show every evening, and a late night Killa Kiwi and Midnight Metal shows. The station was previously broadcast throughout the Bay of Plenty of 97.7 and in Ōhope on 99.3.

In summer 1993/1994 1XX ran an album rock format station, Bayrock 97.7FM. Bayrock went on the air on 26 December 1993 and ran to 6 February 1994. After many petitions, letters and phone calls Bayrock was brought back on a permanent basis on 8 July 1994. Bayrock still operates as a completely local radio station today.

=== Q97 Beats ===
Q97 Beats is broadcast throughout Bay Of Plenty on 97.7 and in Ōhope. The station's playlist consists of Roots Reggae, R&B, and Hip Hop with an emphasis on New Zealand and local artists, alongside international releases. It's a sound that resonates with the Eastern Bay of Plenty.

The station was previously known as Q97, which played a top 40 format of pop hits from the past five years. At one stage it had moved to an electronic dance format before returning to top 40. On 1 October 2026, the station was relaunched as Q97 Beats, replacing the earlier Q97 format and identity.

Q97 Beats is part of Media Bay of Plenty alongside 1XX and Bayrock."
