= Handle the Jandal =

- Awarded for: Excellence in independent New Zealand music video
- Location: Wellington
- Country: New Zealand
- Presented by: Radio Active
- Reward: Golden Jandal
- First award: 1997
- Final award: 2009

Handle the Jandal was an annual New Zealand awards ceremony that celebrated self-produced New Zealand music videos. Formally known as the Radio Active 89FM Handle the Jandal DIY New Zealand Music Video Awards, the competition was open to music videos of New Zealand music, made by New Zealand filmmakers with no external funding assistance.

== History ==
Handle the Jandal was founded in 1997 by Dave Gibbons, manager of Wellington alternative radio station Radio Active. It grew from a local event to a nationally significant competition, attracting entries from around New Zealand.

Handle the Jandal was initially held at the Paramount Theatre but from 2004 it relocated to the Embassy Theatre, both in central Wellington.

Previous winners who have gone on to prominent careers both in New Zealand and on the international scene include James Barr, Chris Graham, Aaron Beck and Rollo Wenlock, who shot a music video for electronic band The Prodigy.

== Competition details ==
A panel of preliminary judges whittled down the entrants for the Handle the Jandal competition to 15 finalists. Once the finalists had been decided, appointments were made for the final judging panel. Judges included prominent New Zealand personalities and film-makers, such as Chris Graham and Taika Waititi. The judging panel decided all but one of the award categories. The Favourite Handle the Jandal Video winner and two runners-up were decided by audience vote.

The Golden Jandal was the award given to winners at the Handle the Jandal award ceremonies.

=== Award categories ===
- Best use of exploitative tactics to promote band
- Best Editing
- Best Cinematography
- Best Concept
- Best Animation
- Rising Star
- Favourite Handle the Jandal Video - Second runner up
- Favourite Handle the Jandal Video - First runner up
- Favourite Handle the Jandal Video - winner

== 2001 Awards ==
The 2001 awards were held on Monday 30 July 2001 at the Embassy Theatre in Wellington. 38 entries were received, with 14 shortlisted for the finals. The category prizes were judged by a panel including directors Chris Graham and Rueben Sutherland.

== 2002 Awards ==
The 2002 awards were held on Monday 5 August 2002 at the Paramount Theatre in Wellington.

Winners

- Best Shameless Use of Exploitative Tactics to Promote Band: Liam Bourke “Love Me” (Liam & Vinnie)
- Best Editing: Kate Logan & Tim Gordon “Littoral” (Hummel)
- Best Cinematography: Seraphin Prince “Sea of Tranquility” (John Stanford)
- Best Concept: James Barr “The Devil at Your Heels” (Raw Sugar)
- Best Animation: Liam Bourke “Maybe Later Baby” (Liam & Vinnie)
- Rising Star: Luke Savage “Trouble” (Dana Eclair)
- 2nd Runner Up: Luke Savage “Trouble” (Dana Eclair)
- 1st Runner Up: Kate Logan & Tim Gordon “Littoral” (Hummel)
- Winner – 1st Prize: Olly Coleman “Waiting feat. Lotus” (Rhian Sheehan)

== 2003 Awards ==
The 2003 awards were held on Tuesday 16 September 2003 at the Paramount Theatre in Wellington. The awards ceremony was streamed online.

Winners

- Best Use of Exploitative Tactics to Promote a Band: Dave Payne "Choke" (Marystaple)
- Best Editing: Rachel Davies "No Ordinary Day" (Ben King)
- Best Cinematography: Raymond Kennard "Species II" (Minuit)
- Best Concept: Richard Shaw "Ready Now" (Sola Rosa)
- Best Animation: Aaron Beck "Schematica" (Olmecha Supreme)
- Favourite Handle The Jandal Video: Aaron Beck "Schematica" (Olmecha Supreme)
- First Runner Up: Sam Buys "Sugar" (Jess Chambers Feat. Dirty Republic)
- Second Runner Up: Ned & Rollo Wenlock "An Afternoon On The Moon" (Rhian Sheehan)

== 2004 Awards ==
The 2004 awards were held on Wednesday 15 September 2004 at the Embassy Theatre in Wellington.

Winners

- Best Use of Exploitative Tactics to Promote Band: Chris Stapp "The People's Party" (Slavetrader)
- Best Editing: Tania Bruce & Andrew Holmes "Simple Days" (Stardrunk)
- Best Cinematography: Richard Bell "Gone Fishing" (The Phoenix Foundation)
- Best Concept: Robin Charles "Pre Amble" (Phelps and Munro)
- Best Animation: Ned Wenlock "San Pedro Sula" (Twinset)
- Rising Star: Rory McHarg "Do What You Gotta Do" (Stylus 77)
- 2nd Runner Up; Robin Charles "Pre Amble" (Phelps and Munro)
- 1st Runner Up: Ned Wenlock "San Pedro Sula" (Twinset)
- Favourite HTJ Video: Rueben Sutherland "Be A Man" (Ebb)

== 2005 Awards ==
The 2005 awards were held on Wednesday 21 September at the Embassy Theatre in Wellington and were hosted by Radio Active DJs Jed "Jedi" Thian and Miles Buckingham. The category judging panel included award-winning music video maker Chris Graham, producer Gemma Gracewood, and acclaimed director Taika Waititi.

Winners

- Best use of exploitative tactics to promote a band: Christian Nicolson "Manama Nuts" (Goon)
- Best Editing: Andrew Johnson "CCTV" (The Video Kid)
- Best Cinematography: Rob Appierdo "Lucky" (Fly My Pretties)
- Best Concept: Ned Wenlock "Theme to Scorpio’s Nest" (Raw Sugar)
- Best Animation: Blain Hosford "Payload" (Autumn Stone)
- Rising Star: Ed Davis "Fools Love Ragga Remix" (Misfits of Science)
- Second runner-up: Andrew Johnson "CCTV" (The Video Kid)
- First runner-up: Clair Burgess "Bruce Lee Bowla" (Sambassadors)
- Winner: Preston McNeil and Jeremy Mansford "Change Me" (GND)

== 2006 Awards ==
The 2006 Handle the Jandal awards were held on Wednesday 20 September 2006 at the Embassy Theatre in Wellington, hosted by Radio Active DJs Rhys Morgan and Shannon Williams. 93 entries were received for the competition.

Winners

- Best use of Exploitative Tactics: Dean Hewison "F**K you Orlando" (Mathew Saville)
- Best Editing: Filthy Joe Smoker "Lucyfer" (The Sorecocks)
- Best Cinematography: Mark Summerville "Send in the Clones" (Battle Circus)
- Best Concept: Sally Tran "O’baby" (Charlie Ash)
- Best Animation: Toby Donald "El Bandido" (Boss Christ)
- Rising Star: Ed Lust "Shut Eye" (Arkitype)
- First place: Sally Tran "O'Baby" (Charlie Ash)
- Second Place: Marc Smith "DJ's Girlfriend" (The Video Kid)
- Third Place: Mark Williams "Who's Your Daddy?" (Agent Alvin)

== 2007 Awards ==
No awards were held in 2007.

== 2008 Awards ==
The 2008 awards had a record 122 entries. Fifteen finalists were shortlisted for the awards ceremony, held on Thursday 27 November 2008 at the Embassy Theatre in Wellington. The category awards were decided by a panel judges, including film-maker Jonathan King, Flying Nun Records founder Roger Shepherd and David Ridler of NZ on Air.

Winners

- Best use of exploitative tactics: The Down Low Concept "Headlights" (The Hot Grits)
- Best editing: Curtis Baigent "It's Getting Me Down" (The Bonnie Scarlets)
- Best Cinematography: Logan McMillan "Ring Around The Rosie" (Flip Grater)
- Best Concept: Daniel Alexander Fowler "Will You?" (Denmark Street)
- Best Animation: Marco Vidaurre "Tane Mahuta" (The Ruby Suns)
- Rising Star: Daniel Alexander Fowler "Will You?" (Denmark Street)
- Third Place: Curtis Baigent "It's Getting Me Down" (The Bonnie Scarlets)
- Second Place: Ben Forman/Judah Finnigan "So Far So Good" (Deep Sea Regret)
- First place: The Down Low Concept "Headlights" (The Hot Grits)

== 2009 Awards ==
The 2009 awards were held on Thursday 29 October 2009 at the Embassy Theatre in Wellington, presented by Radio Active DJ Liam Luff. The awards had 133 entries that were reduced to a shortlist of 15 finalists.

Winners

- Best Use of Exploitative Tactics to Promote A Band: Judah Finnigan and Ben Forman "Berserk" (Highlife)
- Best Editing: Joe Fish "A Obvious" (James Duncan)
- Best Cinematography: Kimberley Brown "Perception" (Electric Wire Hustle)
- Best Concept: Lisa Dunn "Weight Watchers" (Parallel Dance Ensemble)
- Best Animation: Preston McNeil "With You In My Bed" (Isaac Aesili)
- Rising Star 2009: Greg Pawsey "Satans Blues" (Cougar Cougar Cougar)
- Third: Judah Finnigan "Highlife's Berserk" (Ben Forman)
- Second: Mike Gray "The Baddies Are Coming" (El Schlong)
- First: Lisa Dunn "Weight Watchers" (Parallel Dance Ensemble)
