= The ITM Fishing Show =

New Zealand television series

- Directed by: Matt Watson
- Presented by: Matt Watson
- Country of origin: New Zealand
- Original language: English
- No. of seasons: 13

Production
- Producer: Matt Watson
- Production company: Tightlines Television

Original release
- Network: Sky Sport 1 (2004); TV One (2005–08, 2014–16); Three (2008–13)
- Release: 18 October 2004 – 3 September 2016

The Fishing Show is a New Zealand television program about all types of sports fishing. Host Matt Watson gained worldwide attention for successfully catching a black marlin, whilst jumping from a helicopter, although this later was proven and owned up to by Matt to be a hoax, it has gained him the nickname "Gannet Man".

The show started as a low budget production in Northland in New Zealand but has now been picked up by the Discovery and Animal Planet channels and will be broadcast in the US in October 2009. Excerpts from the show have been a hit on YouTube where David Letterman learnt of it. When interviewed on The Late Show, Matt said, "...doing my job, you need balls".

== Episodes ==
Series	Episodes	Originally released		
Series	Episodes	First released	Last released	Network
1	TBA	18 October 2004	TBA	Sky Sport 1
2	21	20 August 2005	10 December 2005	TV One
3	26	2006	27 January 2007	TV One
4	26	9 June 2007	22 December 2007	TV One
5	TBA	26 April 2008	TBA	TV3
6	TBA	25 April 2009	TBA	TV3
7	32	2010	11 December 2010	TV3
8	25	2011	8 October 2011	TV3
9	25	5 May 2012	20 October 2012	TV3
10	TBA	4 May 2013	TBA	TV3
11	12	3 May 2014	9 August 2014	TV One
12	13	11 June 2015	25 July 2015	TV One
13	13	12 June 2016	3 September 2016	TV One

=== Season 1 ===
No. overall	No. in season	Title	Directed by	Original release date
1	1	"Big Snapper"	Unknown	18 October 2004
2	2	"Episode 2"	Unknown	25 October 2004
3	3	"Ultimate Adventure Part II"	Unknown	1 November 2004
4	4	"Helifishing the Far North"	Unknown	8 November 2004
5	5	"Salt Fly Kingfish"	Unknown	15 November 2004
6	6	"Salt Fly Kingfish Pt II"	Unknown	22 November 2004
7	7	"Pocket Battleship"	Unknown	29 November 2004
8	8	"Tongan Terrors"	Unknown	6 December 2004
9	9	"Who Let the Dogs Out??"	TBA	TBA
10	10	"The Ultimate Day"	TBA	TBA

=== Best of The Fishing Show ===
No. overall	No. in season	Title	Directed by	Original release date
11	1	TBA	Unknown	16 July 2005
13	3	"The Ultimate Day"	Unknown	30 July 2005
14	4	"Who Let the Dogs Out?"	Unknown	6 August 2005
15	5	"Big Snapper by Helicopter"	Unknown	13 August 2005

=== Season 2 ===
No. overall	No. in season	Title	Directed by	Original release date
47	6	"Mid Winter Fishing Mission"	Unknown	20 August 2005
48	7	"The Ultimate Off Shore Adventure"	Unknown	27 August 2005
49	8	"The Ultimate Offshore Adventure Part II"	Unknown	3 September 2005
50	9	"The Kings of White Island"	Unknown	19 September 2005
51	10	"The Kings of White Island Pt II"	Unknown	17 September 2005
52	11	"Bay of Plenty Bonanza"	Unknown	24 September 2005
53	12	"Tongan Billfish Tournament"	Unknown	8 October 2005
56	15	"Eastcape Traditional Fishing"	Unknown	29 October 2005
58	17	"Big Tuna"	Unknown	12 November 2005
59	18	"Tangling with Trout"	Unknown	19 November 2005
60	19	"The Big Snapper Hunt"	Unknown	26 November 2005
61	20	"Ranfurly Big Fish Bonanza"	Unknown	3 December 2005
62	21	"The Extreme Fishing Make Over"	Unknown	10 December 2005

=== Series 3: The ITM Vanuatu Fishing Challenge ===
No. overall	No. in season	Title	Directed by	Original release date
73	11	"Trailer Boat Marlin"	Unknown	23 September 2006
74	12	"Cast Away Land Based"	Unknown	7 October 2006
75	13	"Cast Away Land Based Pt 2"	Unknown	14 October 2006
76	25	"Taupo Trout 2"	Unknown	20 January 2007
77	26	"Vanuatu Santo"	Unknown	27 January 2007

=== Season 4 ===
No. overall	No. in season	Title	Directed by	Original release date
78	1	"The Rock Stars of Snapper Fishing"	Unknown	9 June 2007
79	2	"Double Strike Winter Mission"	Unknown	16 June 2007
80	3	"Double Strike Winter Mission Pt 2"	Unknown	23 June 2007
81	4	"Marlin on a Sea Doo"	Unknown	30 June 2007
82	5	"Giant Bluefin Chaos"	Unknown	7 July 2007
83	6	"Giant Bluefin Chaos Pt. 2"	Unknown	14 July 2007
84	7	"Kingfish Madness"	Unknown	21 July 2007
85	8	"Kingfish Madness Pt. 2"	Unknown	28 July 2007
86	9	TBA	Unknown	4 July 2007
87	10	"The Mako Hunt"	Unknown	11 August 2007
88	11	"Search for the Great White Shark"	Unknown	25 August 2007
89	12	"Search for the Great White Shark Pt. 2"	Unknown	1 September 2007
90	13	"Fishing Rocks"	Unknown	8 September 2007
91	14	"Ultimate Lady Doggies"	Unknown	15 September 2007
92	15	"Bay Plastics"	Unknown	22 September 2007
93	16	"Bay Plastics Pt 2"	Unknown	6 October 2007
94	17	"The Mother Trip"	Unknown	20 October 2007
95	18	"Adventure to Santo"	Unknown	27 October 2007
96	19	"Adventure to Santo Pt. 2"	Unknown	3 November 2007
97	20	"Great White Shark on a Handline"	Unknown	10 November 2007
98	21	"The Ranfurly Banks"	Unknown	17 November 2007
99	22	"Barrier Revisited"	Unknown	24 November 2007
100	23	"The ITM Fishing Show Special Feature"	Unknown	1 December 2007
101	24	"North vs South"	Unknown	8 December 2007
102	25	"Chathams Bounty"	Unknown	15 December 2007
103	26	"Make The Most of Your Catch"	Unknown	22 December 2007

=== Season 5 ===
No. overall	No. in season	Title	Directed by	Original release date
104	1	"Plastic Fantastic – Part One"	Unknown	26 April 2008
105	2	TBA	Unknown	3 May 2008
106	3	"Hardcore Land Based"	Unknown	10 May 2008
107	4	"Blue Fin on a Hand Line Pt 1"	Unknown	17 May 2008
108	5	"Blue Fin on a Hand Line Pt 2"	Unknown	24 May 2008
109	6	"Big Snapper in the Bay Pt 1"	Unknown	31 May 2008
110	7	"Big Snapper in the Bay Pt 2"	Unknown	7 June 2008
111	8	"Heli Kingis"	Unknown	14 June 2008
112	9	"Spear Tagging Mission"	Unknown	21 June 2008
113	10	"Bluefin on a Handline from a Dinghy"	Unknown	28 June 2008
114	11	"Chathams Destination"	Unknown	12 July 2008

=== Season 11 ===
No. overall	No. in season	Title	Directed by	Original release date
TBA	1	"The Perfect Day"	Unknown	3 May 2014
TBA	2	"The Hunt for the 40lb Snapper"	Unknown	10 May 2014
TBA	3	"Out Wide Kayak Fishing"	Unknown	17 May 2014
TBA	4	"Night Time in the Tropics"	Unknown	24 May 2014
TBA	5	"The Epic 'Day' Out"	Unknown	31 May 2014
TBA	6	"The Epic 'Night' Out Pt2"	Unknown	7 June 2014
TBA	7	"Teaching the Warriors to Catch"	Unknown	28 June 2014
TBA	8	"A Live-Aboard Fishing Experience"	Unknown	12 July 2014
TBA	9	"Insane Kite Fishing!"	Unknown	19 July 2014
TBA	10	"Make It Snappy – 15 Ways in a Day"	Unknown	26 July 2014
TBA	11	"Where the Whakataki Is That?"	Unknown	2 August 2014
TBA	12	"Mexico Delivers!"	Unknown	9 August 2014

=== Season 12 ===
No. overall	No. in season	Title	Directed by	Original release date
TBA	1	"No Boat?...No Worries!!!"	Unknown	2 May 2015
TBA	2	"Phillip Island"	Unknown	9 May 2015
TBA	3	"Getting the Girls Out"	Unknown	9 May 2015
TBA	4	"West Coast Waikato"	Unknown	23 May 2015
TBA	5	"Mexico Madness"	TBD	June 2015
TBA	6	"Kids Fishing"	TBD	June 2015
TBA	7	"Rags to Fishes"	TBD	June 2015
TBA	8	"Going Big on a Kayak"	Unknown	20 June 2015
TBA	9	"Remote Controlled Land Based Fishing"	Unknown	27 June 2015
TBA	10	"East Coast Exploration"	Unknown	4 July 2015
TBA	11	"Fiordland"	Unknown	11 July 2015
TBA	12	"South Island Hunt and Fish"	Unknown	18 July 2015
TBA	13	"Competition Fishing"	Unknown	25 July 2015

=== Season 13 ===
No. overall	No. in season	Title	Directed by	Original release date
TBA	3	"Three Kings Trailer Boat Mission Part 1"	Unknown	25 June 2016
TBA	7	"Average Joes"	Unknown	23 July 2016
TBA	10	"Cape Verde – The Blue Marlin Adventure"	Unknown	13 August 2016
TBA	11	"Cape Verde – The Art of SportFishing"	Unknown	20 August 2016
TBA	12	"Fishing Is for Everyone."	Unknown	27 August 2016
TBA	13	"What Lurks in the Deep?"	Unknown	3 September 2016
