= ASB Business =

- ASB Business Intertitle
- Starring: Michael Wilson
- Country of origin: New Zealand

Production
- Running time: 30 Minutes

Original release
- Network: TV3
- Release: 6 October 2008 – 8 April 2010

ASB Business is a half-hour business news programme in New Zealand, with insights into issues affecting the business sector. It was broadcast on TV3 between 6.30am and 7.00am weekdays, followed by Sunrise.

== Format ==
Starting on 2 October 2007, ASB Business had been a main part of Sunrise, which was on air from 6:30 am. In an aim to attract more business viewers, particularly in Auckland, it was decided that from 6 October 2008, a new 30-minute version of ASB Business would be produced. It was hosted by financial journalist Michael Wilson. Sunrise moved to start at 7:00 am, featuring regular business updates.

TV3 cancelled ASB Business and Sunrise on 8 April 2010, stating both programmes were financially unsustainable.

ASB Business was previously the name of rival TVNZ's morning business programme on TV One at a similar timeslot. This programme is now titled NZI Business

== Team ==
- Michael Wilson - host
- Tony Field - backup host
- Emma Brannam - reporter
- Liz Kirschberg - executive producer
