= Outdoors with Geoff =

- Written by: Geoff Thomas
- Directed by: Geoff Thomas
- Composer: Larry Killip
- Country of origin: New Zealand
- No. of seasons: 17

Production
- Producer: Geoff Thomas
- Running time: 30 minutes
- Production company: Rainbow Productions

Original release
- Network: TV3
- Release: 2003 – 26 March 2016

Outdoors with Geoff is a hunting/fishing television show it aired on Three in New Zealand. The programme premiered in 2003. Hosted by Geoff Thomas, Rheem New Zealand sponsored the programme.

== Sources ==
1) http://www.tv3.co.nz/Shows/OutdoorsWithGeoff.aspx
