= Battle Circus (band) =

New Zealand progressive rock band

- Origin: Auckland, New Zealand
- Genres: Progressive rock Psychedelic rock Symphonic rock Dark Cabaret
- Years active: 2004 – 2011
- Past members: Marcel Bellvé; Yvonne Wu; Ryan Marshall; James Whitlock; Tory "Jester" Staples; Daniel Bosher; Peter Connors

Battle Circus was a progressive rock band from Auckland, New Zealand. The band, formed in 2004, consisted of members Marcel Bellve (Vocals, Guitar), Yvonne Wu (Piano, Keyboards), James Whitlock (Drums) & Ryan Marshall (Bass).

Named after the 1953 Humphrey Bogart film, the band toured New Zealand constantly for several years, before setting off on international tours across Australia, Europe, and the United States (where they eventually relocated in 2010).

Battle Circus performed at many international festivals, including the Big Day Out in New Zealand, SXSW and Culture Collide in the United States, Spring Scream Festival in Taiwan, and Fuse Festival in Australia.

The band had notable relations to fellow Auckland, New Zealand band Decortica of which past member Tory Staples is now a member of. Furthermore, Daniel Bosher, a past member of Decortica and brother of their frontman Mathew Bosher, joined Battle Circus in their later years. The two bands performed and toured together for several years, becoming two of the most prominent acts amongst the area's progressive rock scene

Following the release of a series of singles, the band released their debut EP, The Half-Light Symphony. The release received local acclaim by NZ Musician and a five star review by Real Groove Magazine.

The band was the opener on Amanda Palmer's 2008 tour of the United Kingdom and Europe. Following these dates, the band embarked on their first world tour in the latter half of 2008. Previously, the band was also selected by The Red Paintings for an Australian tour, and earlier in 2007 performed at the main stage at Taiwan's infamous Spring Scream Festival.

On 27 July 2011, shortly after the release of the band's debut album, the band declared on their Facebook page that they had disbanded, though Marcel Bellvé would continue to write for a different project titled Lipsink.

== Discography ==
=== Albums ===
- Battle Circus (2011)

=== EPs ===
- The Half-Light Symphony (2007)

=== Videos ===
- Send in the Clones (2006)
- Love in a Fallout Shelter (2007)
- Utopium (2007)
- The Fantabulous Flying Machine (2011)
- Galacticus (2011)

All music by the band can be listened to or downloaded here: http://battlecircus.bandcamp.com/
