= Mean Mums =

- Genre: Sitcom
- Created by: Amanda Alison
- Starring: Morgana O'Reilly; Anna Jullienne; Aroha Rawson
- Country of origin: New Zealand
- Original language: English
- No. of seasons: 3
- No. of episodes: 24 (+ pilot)

Production
- Producer: Rachel Jean
- Production company: South Pacific Pictures

Original release
- Network: Three
- Release: 16 July 2019 – present

Mean Mums is a New Zealand sitcom airing on Three, created by Amanda Alison. The series follows mothers at a local primary school. A pilot for the series originally aired as part of Three's Comedy Pilot Week in 2018. It is broadcast in the United States on Peacock.

== Cast ==
- Morgana O'Reilly as Jess Knight
- Anna Jullienne as Heather Maloney
- Aroha Rawson as Hine
- Allan Henry as Principal Coxhead
- Sonny Tupu as Phil Right
- Bronwyn Bradley as Miss Love
- Goretti Chadwick as Margot
- Cori Gonzalez-Macuer as Freddy
- Eddie Waspe as Ryan Knight
- Maddie Smith as Cinnamon Maloney
- Manu Powell as Braxton
- Pax Assadi as Dad

== Series overview ==
Season	Episodes	Originally released	
Season	Episodes	First released	Last released
Pilot	1	September 23, 2018	
1	8	16 July 2019	3 September 2019
2	8	15 September 2020	3 November 2020
3	8	18 August 2022	6 October 2022
