= Tokyo Comedy Store =

Comedy show in Tokyo, Japan

The Tokyo Comedy Store (TCS) is an English-language comedy show held at various venues in central Tokyo, Japan. It features stand-up comedians and improvised comedy.

== History ==
The Tokyo Comedy Store was founded in 1994 as the "Tokyo Comedy Club" by Kevin Burns. Burns gathered together stand-up comics and a hypnotist by placing many ads in the Tokyo Classifieds (now called The Metropolis), calling for performers. The first show was held at the Tokyo American Club, and the second at the British Club in Ebisu, Tokyo. Roughly around the same time a separate group called the Tokyo Cynics started an all stand-up comedy show in the Takadanobaba area at a bar called The Fiddler.

By about 1998, Burns was no longer involved, and from that time up until the mid-2000s the group was run first by Nick Abrahams, then Michael Naishtut, who had been independently performing improv comedy in Tokyo, and Chris Wells, one of the founding members of TCS. Naishtut was also hosting the "Tokyo Cynics" shows, and the two groups were effectively merged. Around the same time, the name was changed to the "Tokyo Comedy Store".

Since then, the Tokyo Comedy Store has held multiple shows every month at various venues. Venues come and go, and so over the year shows have come and gone, or moved locations, but there were usually between three and six shows running at any one time. Other shows around Tokyo had been organized by Dave Gutteridge, who since the early 2000s had been a show runner, performer, and administrator of the website.

== Format ==
Some shows involved stand-up, some involved improv, and some involved both. The cornerstone show continues to be held on the last Friday of every month and featured stand-up comedians in the first half until 2015. The second half of the show consisted of an entirely improvised comedy by "Spontaneous Confabulation" (known as "Spontaneous Confusion" until 2010), the resident improv troupe. The show usually ended with music-based improvisation.

In 2015 the cornerstone show was rebranded ”The TCS Improvazilla Show” and changed to an all-improv format. The standup performers now perform at several different venues around town, including through Standup Tokyo. The TCS Improvazilla Show now features a long-form montage based on audience responses to a monthly changing question, an audience member interview, or a spoken word performance in the first act, and a long-form musical in the first act. These are called “What’s on Your Mind?” and “Musical Premiere”, respectively. The performers are now referred to as simply “the Improvazilla cast.”

The a musical Premiere is done in various genres throughout the year, including a 1940s love story for February's Valentine's Day special, and a zombie-themed musical in October for the Halloween Special.

== Directors ==
TCS directors Chris Wells and Jun Imai teach internationally, and have been invited to teach at improv conferences in Europe, Asia, the Middle East and the Americas.

Chris Wells runs the Improvazilla show at the Crocodile live-house in Shibuya, attracting audiences of around 80, the vast majority of whom are non-Japanese, as well as the TCS School of Improv and Acting at Studio Gokko, a black box theatre and workshop space in Shibuya-Ku, which opened in April, 2019. The school offers improv and acting lessons in Japanese, English and Spanish on a daily basis.

Jun Imai directs improvised and scripted plays at Studio Gokko and teaches improv and acting classes there on a weekly basis. He is the author of five volumes on improvisation, including the long-selling “Jiyu ni naru no ha taihen na no da: Impro Manual” (It's Tough to be Free: Impro Manual).

== Tokyo Comedy Store film ==
A documentary film about the Tokyo Comedy Store was made and released on DOC: The Documentary Channel in 2008. The film is a narrative account of director Brian C. Anderson's experience performing with the stand-up comedians of the Tokyo Comedy Store. Anderson's film explores the differences between Eastern and Western styles of comedy, and showcases various acts he encounters as he progresses as a stand-up comedian in Tokyo. Anderson made the film while stationed overseas in the United States Air Force.
