= Bigger, Better, Faster, Stronger =

- Genre: Reality television Science
- Directed by: Josh Thomson
- Starring: James Coleman; Greg Page; Kirsten Pederson
- Narrated by: Paul Ego
- Country of origin: New Zealand
- Original language: English
- No. of seasons: 1
- No. of episodes: 10

Production
- Production company: The Down Low Concept

Original release
- Network: TV3
- Release: 7 February – 11 April 2011

Bigger, Better, Faster, Stronger is a New Zealand science-based reality television series broadcast on TV3. Each episode saw the two hosts, James Coleman and Greg Page, work to produce a "new and improved" version of a household appliance or object. At the beginning of each episode, the hosts selected their team from a combined pool of five people, four of whom had skills that were of value to the project, and one of whom (the wildcard) did not. They then spent the remainder of the day in a shed producing the new device, before holding competitive tests the following morning. The tests were adjudicated by Kirsten Pederson.

Before the series aired, Coleman told news media that the episode in which he attempted to make a clothes drier from a lawnmower engine and an angle grinder was a near-disaster, as "The clothes ended up being distributed in specks of cotton around the laundry and the hooks flew off and embedded themselves around the set," but "Luckily, they didn't kill or blind anyone."

The series was nominated for an Aotearoa Film & Television Award in 2011.

== Episodes ==
No.	Task	Original release date
1	"Vacuum cleaners"	February 7, 2011
In the series opener, Page devised an elegant solution to recreating the vacuum cleaner using a venturi system. Coleman harnessed the power of a home-made jet engine to increase the suction of the domestic vacuum cleaner but destroyed half the set in the process.
2	"Mailboxes"	February 14, 2011
With the task of bringing mail from a mailbox to a house, Page's team built a truck-powered pulley system. Coleman, having selected a rocket scientist for his team, opted for the rocket-powered option. The rocket was later auctioned for charity.
3	"Toasters"	February 21, 2011
The challenge was to cook and eat four slices of toast in the quickest time. Coleman chose the wildcard (a life coach), and opted to build a propane-powered bolt-action toaster. Page built a toaster around halogen light bulbs, and destroyed the breakfast table.
4	"Showers"	February 28, 2011
The teams had to create a power shower that used the least amount of water. Team Page created a misting shower, and Coleman, a petrol powered monstrosity.
5	"Waste disposal"	March 7, 2011
In developing a method of disposing of a garbage bag full of rubbish, Page's team fashioned a pneumatic press, while Team Coleman's team built a giant air cannon, believed to be the largest in the southern hemisphere.
6	"Barbecues"	March 14, 2011
The teams did the unthinkable and redesigned the BBQ. Page unleashed the power of microwaves on his sausages, whilst Coleman created a gigantic pressure cooker which exploded disqualifying his team's efforts.
7	"Chores and tea"	March 21, 2011
The teams are challenged to create a machine that will do a household chore and also make tea. Page created a wallpaper remover/tea maker, while Coleman fashioned a chainsaw that also made tea.
8	"Juicer"	March 28, 2011
Page created a juicer using an industrial sized electric engine and a barrel, while Coleman attempted to harness gunpowder to make juice.
9	"Clothes driers"	April 4, 2011
Team Page created a freeze-drying solution whilst Coleman harnessed the power of a lawn-mower engine to create a highly dangerous centrifuge.
10	"Lawn mowers"	April 11, 2011
Page created a mega-mower, and in his most ambitious project of the series Coleman creates a flame-thrower to ensure that he never has to mow his lawn again.

== See also ==
Similar television series

- Bang Goes the Theory
- Brainiac: Science Abuse
- Dude, What Would Happen?
- It's Effin' Science
- MythBusters
- Prototype This!
- Proving Ground
- The Re-Inventors
- Smash Lab
- Time Warp
