= Battle Circus (album) =

Studio album by Battle Circus
- Released: 20 June 2011
- Recorded: C-Barn Studios, Raglan and Venn Productions, Auckland
- Genre: Progressive rock, symphonic rock, dark cabaret
- Length: 65:17
- Label: Self-released
- Producer: David Holmes, Battle Circus

Battle Circus chronology
The Half-Light Symphony (2007)	Battle Circus (2011)

Singles from Battle Circus
- 1. "The Fantabulous Flying Machine" Released: 20 April 2011; 2. "Galacticus" Released: 20 June 2011

Battle Circus is the eponymous debut album by New Zealand progressive rock band Battle Circus released on 20 June 2011. The album features the songs "Send In The Clones" and "Utopium", which have been re-recorded since their original release, available on the band's EP "The Half-Light Symphony".

== Track listing ==
All tracks are written by Battle Circus.

No.	Title	Length
1.	"Beggar Turns Thief"	6:15
2.	"Send In The Clones"	3:46
3.	"Galacticus"	4:14
4.	"Crush"	5:25
5.	"Much Like Mescaline"	14:08
6.	"Clockwork"	6:53
7.	"Coup de Silence"	4:41
8.	"Flying Machine"	9:26
9.	"Utopium"	5:05
10.	"Discord"	5:24

== Personnel ==
Battle Circus

- Marcel Bellve – Vocals, Guitar, Additional Percussion on "Much Like Mescaline"
- Yvonne Wu – Piano
- Ryan Marshall – Bass
- James Whitlock – Drums, Percussion (All Tracks Except 3 & 4)
- Daniel Bosher – Drums, Percussion (Tracks 3 & 4)

Additional Personnel

- David Holmes – Production, Mixing
- Mike Gibson – Mastering
- Ryan Chen – Violin
- Kirsten McCrae – Viola
- Sera Ellis – Cello
- Darija Andzakovic – Double bass
- Rilind Tairi – Additional Percussion on "Much Like Mescaline"
- Mathew Bosher – Additional Percussion on "Much Like Mescaline"
