= Sunny Skies =

- Genre: Sitcom
- Created by: Mike Smith; Paul Yates
- Starring: Oliver Driver; Tammy Davis; Erroll Shand; Morgana O'Reilly; Molly Tyrrell
- Country of origin: New Zealand
- Original language: English
- No. of seasons: 1

Production
- Running time: 22 minutes

Original release
- Network: TV3
- Release: 8 February – 15 March 2013

Sunny Skies is a New Zealand comedy television show that aired on TV3 in the summer of 2013. The show stars Tammy Davis and Oliver Driver as two brothers who unwittingly inherit a local campground.

== Plot ==
Sunny Skies is a New Zealand comedy starring Oliver Driver and Tammy Davis as two brothers who unwittingly discover they’ve inherited a campground. Oliver Driver plays Oscar, a sharp-edged, arrogant businessman, intent on gaining profit from the Sunny Skies campground. Tammy Davis plays his brother Deano, who loves a laugh with the new friends he’s discovered. The show was created by Mike Smith and Paul Yates.

== Cast and characters ==
- Oliver Driver plays Oscar, a business man who specialises in human resources despite being terrible with people. Oscar is cynical, witty, stingy, easily bored, not good with people (though secretly wishes he was), hypochondriac, Mummy’s boy, fastidious and he's bordering on obsessive compulsive.
- Tammy Davis plays Deano, the optimistic half brother of Oscar who has inherited half a campground. Deano is philosophical, optimistic, sentimental, warm-hearted and a good dad. Unfortunately, Deano has been a failure at nearly every job he’s tried. His problem is that he’s well-meaning but forgetful and easily flustered.
- Morgana O'Reilly plays Nicki, the independent, organised campground owner. Nicki believes she should own the place but her father had other ideas in his will. She is keen to show the boys how much of a hard job it is to run a camp site.
- Molly Tyrrell plays Charlotte, Deano's sarcastic and cheeky daughter. Charlotte is annoyed to be at the campground and would rather be back at a 'real' school with her friends.
