= Marystaple =

- Origin: New Zealand
- Genres: Alternative, blues, indie
- Years active: 1996 - present
- Members: Matt Fairley; Aaron McMinn; Mike Enoka
- Past members: Sam F
- Website: www.marystaple.co.nz

Marystaple (also known by its fans as Staple) is a New Zealand-based alternative rock band formed in 1996.

== Band members ==
- Matt Fairley (lead vocals, guitar)
- Aaron McMinn (bass guitar)
- Mike Enoka (drums)

== History ==
After the release of their well received first EP Reset Speed in 2002, the band began the first of two nationwide tours around New Zealand. They played over 60 gigs (many of which sold out) and included gigs with The Datsuns, The D4, Superjesus, Grinspoon and Betchadupa. Two of their music videos reached M2's top 12 charts (with both of them staying on for over 2 months).

== Discography ==
=== Albums ===
| Release date | Title | Label | Catalog number |
|---|---|---|---|
Albums
| 2008 | No Need to Be Nervous | | |
EPs
| 2002 | Reset Speed | Hey Harry | HHR02 |
| 2003 | Shotgun | | |

=== Tracks on various compilations ===
| Date | Title | Label | Track(s) featured |
|---|---|---|---|
| 2003 | "StarF*ckers" | Antenna Recordings | Labourer from Reset Speed |

== In the media ==
=== Television ===
"Labourer" was used in the season 1, episode 17 "Sex, Lies and Spacerocks" of The Gibson Group Ltd comedy/drama series The Strip.
