= Family Feud (New Zealand game show) =

Former New Zealand television game show

- Genre: Game Show
- Created by: Mark Goodson
- Based on: Family Feud
- Presented by: Dai Henwood
- Country of origin: New Zealand
- Original language: English
- No. of seasons: 3
- No. of episodes: 384

Production
- Running time: 24 minutes
- Production company: FremantleMedia Australia

Original release
- Network: Three
- Release: 15 February 2016 – 27 November 2017

Family Feud is a New Zealand game show based on the American show of the same name. It began airing on Three on 15 February 2016 and finished on 27 November 2017. It is hosted by comedian Dai Henwood, and aired Mondays to Fridays at 5:30pm. The set, logo, and format are almost identical to the 2014 Australian version; it is filmed in Epsom. The winning family plays Fast Money for $5,000, and winners of five nights in a row win a brand new car. Thirteen families managed to accomplish the latter.

On All-Star Family Feud, six rounds would be played with the fourth and fifth questions being worth double points and the last question being worth triple points. Each team's charity or charities would receive a donation of $2,000. Each Fast Money point donated $10 and scoring 200 points still added $5,000 to any money won.

On 8 December 2017 it was announced the show had been cancelled as the host, Dai Henwood, would be too busy hosting a renewed season of Dancing with the Stars in 2018.

== Merchandise ==
A Family Feud board game was released by Imagination in 2016. A Star Wars-themed edition was released in 2017.
