= Sunrise (New Zealand TV programme) =

- Starring: Carly Flynn, Oliver Driver
- Country of origin: New Zealand

Production
- Running time: 120 minutes

Original release
- Network: TV3
- Release: 2 October 2007 – 9 April 2010

Sunrise is a New Zealand breakfast television news and current affairs programme, which was broadcast live on TV3 between 2007 and 2010. It aired from 7.00am to 9.00am each weekdays. The show featured all the latest current affairs, news, sports, business and weather news. The programme followed ASB Business, which was broadcast at 6.30am.

TV3 cancelled Sunrise and ASB Business on 8 April 2010, stating that the programmes were financially unsustainable. A farewell was made by the presenters on the last episode, which was aired the day after the cancellation announcement.

== Presenters ==
=== As of Finale ===
- Carly Flynn (host)
- Oliver Driver (co-host)
- Sacha McNeil (news)

=== Backup presenters ===
- Petra Bagust
- Jaquie Brown

=== Past presenters ===
- 2007–2008 – James Coleman

== Format ==
Sunrise had news, sport and weather updates every 30 minutes throughout the programme, wrapped around interviews with newsmakers, celebrities and people of interest. ASB Business updates also featured throughout the show, and were hosted by Michael Wilson.

The programme was originally hosted by Carly Flynn and James Coleman, but Coleman resigned in September 2008, hosting his last show on 26 September. Oliver Driver replaced Coleman as Flynn's co-host on 6 October.

Sunrise was supplemented by the TV3's midday bulletin 3 News at 12 which started on Tuesday, 2 October 2007.

In a move to give the show a different feel to rival programming, Sunrise tended to use both presenters to start discussions with guests, rather than a direct interview.
