= Oliver Driver =

New Zealand actor (born 1974)

- Born: Oliver Driver; 22 November 1974 (age 51); Auckland, New Zealand

Oliver Driver (born 22 November 1974) is a New Zealand actor, director, broadcaster and television presenter.

== Television ==
Driver was the host of Let's Be Frank, and the Creative Director of New Zealand's only alternative music television station, ALT TV. The channel is now no longer on air. He co-hosted TV3's early morning news show Sunrise, which was cancelled on 8 April 2010.

Driver played Mike Galloway, a pot-smoking nurse on the long-running New Zealand drama Shortland Street as well as starring in a comedy called Serial Killers, which was based on the lives of six storyliners working on a Shortland Street-style hospital based soap. For three years he hosted the TVNZ arts programme Frontseat. Driver returned to Shortland Street in the 2010s as a co-producer and director for 57 episodes from 2011-2023. He returned as producer for 1321+ episodes from 2019 and produced 6 episodes of spinoff Shortland Street: Retribution in 2021-2022.

He finished a three-year contract in 2008 of voicing advertisements for The Warehouse, a nationwide retail store in New Zealand.

Driver is known outside of New Zealand as the voice of Jenji on Power Rangers Mystic Force and as Master Swoop in Power Rangers Jungle Fury. He returned to the franchise as a director in both Power Rangers Ninja Steel/Power Rangers Super Ninja Steel and Power Rangers Beast Morphers Season 1 and 2.

In 2012 Driver joined the cast of The Almighty Johnsons in a recurring role as Eggther during the show's second season.

Driver is also a "Guest Panelist" and "Team Leader" on the New Zealand version of Would I Lie to You?.

He worked on a television show called Sunny Skies as Oscar, which premiered on TV3 on 8 February 2013. alongside Tammy Davis.

== Radio ==
Driver used to host the Almost Monday radio talkback show for New Zealand's nationwide Newstalk ZB radio station on Sunday evenings. The "Almost Monday" show was back on air on Newtalk ZB as of Sunday 23 January 2011 however it is no longer on the air.

== Film ==
In 2006 Driver starred in the horror comedy film Black Sheep. He appeared in Jonathan King's Under the Mountain, a film adaptation of the Maurice Gee book of the same name as Mr Wilberforce, the main villain.

Driver has also appeared in A Death in The Family, Topless Women Talk About Their Lives, Magik and Rose, Snakeskin and Toy Love.

== Theatre ==
He starred in the play The Pillowman at the Maidment Theatre, Auckland; in a season of Harold Pinter's Betrayal for Silo Theatre; and in Brendan Cowell's Ruben Guthrie at Herald Theatre, The Edge, Auckland, New Zealand. Previously he was the Artistic Director of Auckland Theatre Company.

== See also ==
- List of New Zealand television personalities
