= Big Angry Fish =

New Zealand fishing television show

- Presented by: Milan Radonich & Nathan O 'Hearn
- Country of origin: New Zealand
- Original language: English
- No. of seasons: 8
- No. of episodes: 104

Original release
- Network: Three
- Release: 29 April 2012 – 8 September 2019

Big Angry Fish is a New Zealand fishing television show hosted by Milan Radonich and Nathan O'Hearn. The programme began airing onwards from the end of April 2012, with thirteen episodes screening weekly on Sundays on Three and weekdays on One (Australian TV channel). A second season began at the end of July 2013, and a third season began at the end of July 2014, the fourth season due to start on 26 July 2015.

== Concept ==
The show is about teaching the anglers the knowledge and techniques required to target trophy fish in shallow water. There is a strong focus on being respectful to sea life and its habitats.

== Locations ==
The majority of season one took viewers to fishing locations around New Zealand, but two episodes are filmed at North America and Thailand. Season 2 included destinations to Panama and Australia, and season 3 was solely focused on New Zealand fishing destinations

== Reception and other information ==
Big Angry Fish (and Fishing Edge) were praised for "consistent fishing action, laidback yet knowledgeable hosts and minimal product plugging".

In 2015, a kayak fisherman who regularly watched the show won a trip on the water with the programme's presenters.
