= Hounds (TV series) =

2011 New Zealand comedy TV series

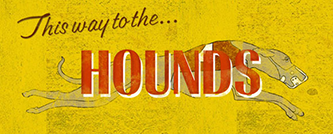
- Genre: Comedy
- Created by: The Down Low Concept
- Written by: The Down Low Concept
- Directed by: The Down Low Concept
- Starring: Toby Sharpe; Susana Tang; Mick Innes; Josh Thomson; Catherine Waller
- Theme music composer: Chabs and Milky (James Dansey of The Sneaks and James Milne of Lawrence Arabia)
- Opening theme: "The Warmth of the Sun"
- Country of origin: New Zealand
- Original language: English
- No. of series: 1
- No. of episodes: 6

Production
- Executive producer: Matt McPhail
- Cinematography: Dave Cameron
- Running time: 25 minsutes
- Production company: The Down Low Concept

Original release
- Network: TV3
- Release: 1 June – 6 July 2012

Hounds is a New Zealand television comedy series, written, produced and directed by The Down Low Concept.

Set in Auckland, New Zealand it centres on a self-centred lawyer, Will Carrington (Toby Sharpe), and the unusual family unit he is thrust into following the death of his father David, (Roy Billing). Will inherits half a stately house, half a racing greyhound with its live in trainer, Marty (Mick Innes), and guardianship of his estranged half-sister Lily (Susana Tang).

The series follows Will's transition from a soulless city slicker as he deals with his new family that he has never met, and the low rent surroundings of the Greyhound community. Backed with a strong supporting cast of comic actors, including Will's best friend, the arrogant and self-serving Lance (Josh Thomson) and shallow ditsy girlfriend Amber (Catherine Waller), Hounds also featured well known comics Guy Williams and Rhys Mathewson in minor roles, and veteran New Zealand actors Derek Payne, Steven Ure and David Weatherley

The series is one of New Zealand's most critically acclaimed comedies ever produced.

== Controversy ==
Before the series even aired it courted controversy due to the name of the racing greyhound Lundybainwatson when lawyer Joe Karam complained to the network citing bad taste and potentially a defamation lawsuit. Writers and producers The Down Low Concept had named the dog after three infamous and controversial New Zealand murder cases, due to the character of Will's father, and the original owner of the dog being a high court judge. The dog's name referred to convicted multiple murderers Mark Lundy, Scott Watson and David Bain. Bain was later acquitted after spending 13 years in jail following numerous appeals from Karam resulting in his eventual release from prison in 2009.

The unintentional publicity stunt caused a minor stir when the producers of the show called for suggestions on the Hounds Facebook page. At the behest of the network the production company re-shot and re-recorded audio in the few scenes where the dog's name was mentioned, renaming the dog Lundydixonwatson. Dixon referred to another controversial New Zealand murderer, Antonie Dixon.

== Awards ==
=== New Zealand Television Awards ===
Year	Award	Category	Nominee	Result	Ref
2012	General TV Award	Best Comedy or Comedy Series	The Down Low Concept	Won	

=== New York Festivals ===
Year	Award	Category	Nominee	Result	Ref
2013	Finalist Certificate	Best Comedy	The Down Low Concept	Won	

=== Script Writer Awards New Zealand (SWANZ) ===
Year	Award	Category	Nominee	Result	Ref
2012	Writing Award	Best Television Comedy Script	The Down Low Concept	Nominated	

=== TV Guide Best On The Box Awards ===
Year	Award	Category	Nominee	Result	Ref
2013	Television	Best Actor	Mick Innes (Marty)	Nominated	
2013	Television	Best Actress	Susana Tang (Lily)	Nominated	
2013	Television	Rising Star	Susana Tang (Lily)	Nominated	
2013	Television	Rising Star	Catherine Waller (Amber)	Nominated	
2013	Television	Best Comedy	The Down Low Concept	Nominated	

Show creators The Down Low Concept were also awarded the Worst Onscreen Death 2013 prize for the death of the dog Lundydixonwatson from television critic Chris Philpott, calling the moment "Laugh-out-loud funny, but totally awkward".

This was the second year in a row for the production company winning in the comedy category at the New Zealand Television Awards, having won the previous year with their comedy gameshow, 7 Days.

== Reception ==
"Is Hounds the best Kiwi comedy ever? Yes." Chris Philpott, Stuff.co.nz

"Hounds, I believe, is the best Kiwi comedy show ever made... at one point during the show's six unmissable episodes I found myself doing just that, snot smeared on the carpet, begging, pleading with them to dial back the laughs just for a bit so I could clean up the mess." Chris Schulz, The New Zealand Herald

"Think Vigil with a post modern nod to Fred Dagg humour". Jane Bowron, The Dominion Post

"This isn't the laugh out loud, neon-lit, canned-laughter comedy we get from so many American imports. It's original, understated and thoroughly well written." Pattie Pegler, Stuff.co.nz

"It is very sweet, completely silly, and amazingly rude". Michele Hewitson, The New Zealand Herald

"Like mould on a bathmat in an Auckland winter, it grows on you. Like the culture from which it springs, it's effortlessly, compulsively, authentically weird." Diana Wichtel, The Listener

"The Down Low Concept took their show to an unfamiliar setting, loaded the cast with unfamiliar (but talented) faces, and stocked the script with some of the cleverest dialogue you'll find in any comedy, let alone a locally produced one". Chris Philpott, Stuff.co.nz

"The Down Low Concept are as close to a Kiwi comedy hit factory as currently exists". Lee Henaghan, The Nelson Mail

"When I watched the whole series the first time it was down to being diligent; the second time was to make absolutely sure it's as good as I thought it was; the third and every subsequent time (and there will be many, I'm sure) will be for the sheer, absolute joy of it" Nick Grant, Herald on Sunday

== Episodes ==
No.	Title	Original release date
1	TBA	1 June 2012
Will is struggling at his law firm, his heart isn't in it and he is making mistakes at work. But one day everything changes. His Dad dies, leaving him a greyhound racing dog, half a house with a live in trainer, Marty, and an estranged half-sister, Lily.
2	TBA	8 June 2012
Will moves into his new house with his unusual new family. He tries to make up for forgetting Lily's birthday by throwing her a surprise party at the dog track.
3	TBA	15 June 2012
The new unconventional family receive some terrible news so they try to distract themselves. Will goes hunting, Marty goes on a date, and Lily tries her hand at fencing.
4	TBA	22 June 2012
Will, Lily and Marty go to the dog auctions to get a new dog. Will quits the job that he hates, Lily gets excited about attending the Dog Owner's Ball, and Marty has an accident.
5	TBA	29 June 2012
Marty is sentenced to community service, Will takes a new job in retail, and Lily tries to get their new dog, Bernie Lomax, back on track after the hound is brutalised by Holden's dog.
6	TBA	6 July 2012
The season finale sees Lily upset that Will is taking a new job that requires a lot of travel and a lot of time away from the family. Marty and Lily take desperate measures to get Bernie Lomax to run again, with surprising results.
