= The Moe Show =

- Also known as: Moe
- Genre: Children's
- Created by: Jeremy Dillon
- Country of origin: New Zealand
- Original language: English
- No. of seasons: 4
- No. of episodes: 217

Production
- Executive producer: Jeremy Dillon
- Producer: Zane Holmes
- Running time: 11–24 minutes
- Production company: Pop-Up Workshop

Original release
- Network: Four (2013–16); Three (2016–present)
- Release: 5 August 2013 – present

The Moe Show is a New Zealand live-action preschool puppet series. It follows puppet character Moe on his journeys of discovery throughout New Zealand.

== Characters ==
Moe is based on the New Zealand legend of the Moehau Monster, and is performed by Jeremy Dillon.

Fern the Forest Fairy is performed by Sarah Thomson.

Gilbert the Gecko and Frank the Fantail are both performed by Simon McKinney.

The voice of the Narrator is provided by former What Now presenter Jason Fa'afoi.
