= List of New Zealand radio personalities =

This is a list of New Zealand radio personalities, including presenters and journalists.

== B ==
- Petra Bagust – Newstalk ZB presenter
- Simon Barnett – Newstalk ZB presenter
- Hilary Barry – former Radio Live newsreader
- Maggie Barry – former Radio Live and Radio New Zealand National presenter
- Kevin Black – former Solid Gold and Radio Hauraki presenter
- Ben Boyce – The Edge, former The Rock presenter
- Greg Boyed – former Newstalk ZB presenter
- Sarah Bradley – former Radio Live newsreader
- Pat Brittenden – radio presenter
- Clint Brown – former Radio Sport presenter

== C ==
- John Campbell – former Checkpoint presenter
- Suzy Cato – Access Radio Network presenter
- Sharyn Casey – The Edge presenter
- Wallace Chapman – Radio New Zealand National presenter
- Lana Coc-Kroft – former radio presenter
- James Coleman – Radio Live and The Sound presenter
- Pam Corkery – former Newstalk ZB presenter
- Joe Cotton – More FM presenter
- Bryan Crump – Radio New Zealand National presenter
- Max Cryer – former Radio Live contributor

== D ==
- Aunt Daisy – former Newstalk ZB presenter
- Simon Dallow – former Easy Mix presenter
- Murray Deaker - former Radio Sport presenter
- Martin Devlin – Radio Sport presenter
- Oliver Driver – former Newstalk ZB presenter
- Heather du Plessis-Allan - Newstalk ZB presenter

== E ==
- Brian Edwards – radio contributor

== F ==
- Andrew Fagan – Radio Live presenter
- Carly Flynn – former Radio Live presenter
- Jay-Jay Feeney - More FM presenter
- Mihingarangi Forbes – Radio New Zealand broadcaster
- Derek Fox – radio presenter
- Ian Fraser – radio presenter

== G ==
- Iain Gallaway – Radio Sport sports commentator
- Duncan Garner – Magic Talk AM Show presenter
- Clarke Gayford – former The Edge, Channel Z, More FM, and George FM presenter
- Polly Gillespie – More FM Wellington presenter

== H ==
- Mikey Havoc – Radio Hauraki presenter
- John Hawkesby – Newstalk ZB contributor
- Kate Hawkesby – Newstalk ZB host
- Dom Harvey – The Edge Breakfast Presenter
- Karyn Hay – Radio New Zealand presenter
- Samantha Hayes – Magic Talk presenter
- Matt Heath - Radio Hauraki presenter
- Paul Henry – former Radio Live presenter
- Dai Henwood – former George FM presenter
- Mark Hewlett – former ZM presenter
- Kim Hill – Radio New Zealand presenter
- Paul Holmes – former Newstalk ZB presenter
- Alison Holst – Radio New Zealand contributor
- Jim Hopkins – radio presenter
- Mike Hosking – Newstalk ZB presenter
- Brooke Howard-Smith – former The Edge presenter

== J ==
- Willie Jackson – Radio Live presenter

== K ==
- Grant Kereama – The Hits presenter
- Ruud Kleinpaste – Newstalk ZB contributor

== L ==
- Michael Laws – former Radio Live radio personality
- Bob Leahy – radio presenter
- Mark Leishman – The Breeze presenter
- Phillip Leishman – radio presenter
- Zane Lowe – Apple Music 1 DJ, former BBC Radio 1 presenter
- Marcus Lush – Newstalk ZB presenter

== M ==
- Toni Marsh – radio newsreader
- Paul Martin – radio presenter
- Gary McCormick – More FM presenter
- Hamish McKay – Magic Talk presenter
- Kevin Milne – Newstalk ZB contributor
- Peter Montgomery – Radio Sport commentator
- Jim Mora – Radio New Zealand presenter
- Stacey Morrison – The Hits presenter
- Lesley Murdoch – Newstalk ZB presenter, sports commentator

== O ==
- Margaret Kathleen O'Brien – radio presenter
- Bernadine Oliver-Kerby – Newstalk ZB newsreader

== P ==
- Steve Parr – radio presenter
- Lindsay Perigo – Radio Live presenter
- Brian Perkins – BBC Radio 4 newsreader
- Jono Pryor – The Edge, former The Rock presenter
- Mike Puru – former The Edge presenter

== Q ==
- Keith Quinn – former Radio New Zealand sports commentator

== R ==
- Bill Ralston – radio presenter
- Clinton Randell – The Edge Breakfast Presenter
- Jason Reeves – Coast Breakfast
- Mark Richardson – Magic Talk AM Show presenter
- Frank Ritchie – Newstalk ZB presenter
- Clint Roberts – ZM, former The Edge and George FM presenter
- Tim Roxborogh – Newstalk ZB presenter
- Geoff Robinson - Radio NZ - presenter

== S ==
• Ric Scarrold - Announcer on 2ZA (twice), 1ZH and Radio Waikato. Also Compere of Skellerup Young Farmer of the Year in 1977 and Royal Tour Commentator 1977. SPTV2 weather voiceovers 1978. Moved back to Television in late 78 as a Commercial Producer. Employed by the new NEWSTALK ZB as contract voiceover man in mid 80s. Worked in Television Sales & Marketing in Auckland, Fiji and Samoa until 2008. Then set up Scarrold Pacific Television (an Auckland based advertising agency) Retired in 2018

- Mark Sainsbury – former Radio Live presenter
- Simon Shepherd – former Radio Live presenter
- Haydn Sherley – radio presenter
- Slave & Otis – radio presenters
- Kerry Smith – former The Breeze (New Zealand) and Radio Live presenter
- Leighton Smith – former Newstalk ZB presenter
- Barry Soper – Newstalk ZB reporter
- Iain Stables – radio personality
- Percy Ronald Stevens – radio presenter
- Toni Street – Coast Breakfast

== T ==
- Jack Tame – Newstalk ZB presenter
- John Tamihere – former Radio Live presenter
- Selwyn Toogood – radio presenter

== V ==
- Tony Veitch – former Newstalk ZB presenter

== W ==
- Bryan Waddle – Radio Sport sports commentator
- Arnold Wall – radio presenter
- Jeremy Wells – Radio Hauraki presenter
- Kerre Woodham – Newstalk ZB presenter
- Guy Williams – former The Edge presenter
- Peter Williams – Magic Talk Mornings host, former 1News anchor
- Susan Wood – Newstalk ZB presenter

== Y ==
- Lindsay Yeo – radio presenter
- Eric Young – Magic Talk presenter, newsreader
