= List of New Zealand television personalities =

This is a list of New Zealand television personalities, including presenters and journalists. It includes those who left the profession, retired, or died.

== A ==
- Suzy Aiken – television personality and Prime News presenter
- Peter Arnett – television journalist, Pulitzer Prize winner
- Astar – television arts and crafts presenter
- Aunt Daisy – radio personality

== B ==
- Petra Bagust – television presenter
- Judy Bailey – television news presenter
- Simon Barnett – radio and television presenter, MoreFM radio morning host
- Hilary Barry – journalist, radio and television presenter
- Maggie Barry – radio host, television presenter, politician
- Kevin Black – radio host
- Dominic Bowden – television personality and host
- Ben Boyce – television and radio personality
- Greg Boyed – television news and current affairs presenter
- Keith Bracey – television presenter and journalist
- Sarah Bradley – television presenter
- Pat Brittenden – talkback host
- Clint Brown – television sports presenter
- Jaquie Brown – television presenter, actress and radio presenter
- Shaun Brown – reporter, presenter and producer and television executive
- Geoff Bryan – reporter, presenter
- Michelle Buchanan – numerologist

== C ==
- Cathy Campbell – sports and news presenter
- John Campbell – television reporter and current affairs host
- Tina Carline – weather presenter and continuity announcer
- Sharyn Casey – radio and television host, actress
- Suzy Cato – children's entertainer and television host
- Wallace Chapman – radio and television host
- Rawdon Christie – journalist, news presenter and host
- John Clarke – satirical comedian, writer and actor; creator of Fred Dagg
- Suzy Clarkson – television host and presenter
- Lana Coc-Kroft – radio and television host, beauty queen
- Jenny-May Coffin – netball player, sports commentator and news presenter
- James Coleman – television presenter, radio host and actor
- Neil Collins – broadcaster and local body politician
- Daniel Corbett – weather presenter
- Jeremy Corbett – television presenter
- Pam Corkery – journalist, broadcaster, and former politician
- Joe Cotton – television and radio personality
- Max Cryer – presenter, singer, writer and academic
- Dave Cull – television presenter, writer and politician

== D ==
- Simon Dallow – journalist, news presenter and barrister
- Tania Dalton – international netball player and netball commentator
- Angela D'Audney – television and radio news presenter
- Murray Deaker – radio and television sports reporter
- Joel Defries – television presenter (British born)
- Martin Devlin – radio and television broadcaster
- Susan Devoy – reality television personality
- Hamish Dodd – television and radio presenter
- Oliver Driver – actor, director, broadcaster and television presenter

== E ==
- Brian Edwards – media personality and author
- Janika ter Ellen – television news anchor
- Marc Ellis – television personality, former All Black
- Guyon Espiner – print and television journalist and presenter
- Alma Evans-Freke – television personality, actor, producer, teacher

== F ==
- Andrew Fagan – radio broadcaster and musician
- Daniel Faitaua – television host
- David Farrier – journalist, documentarian and podcaster
- Joan Faulkner-Blake – broadcaster
- Jay-Jay Feeney – radio broadcaster
- Carly Flynn – radio and television reporter and presenter
- Mihingarangi Forbes – television presenter, journalist and radio broadcaster
- Derek Fox – broadcaster, commentator, publisher, journalist and candidate
- Ian Fraser – broadcaster and television executive

== G ==
- Iain Gallaway – radio sports commentator
- Duncan Garner – radio and television host and political journalist
- Clarke Gayford – television presenter
- Matthew Gibb – television presenter
- Alex Gilbert – adoption advocate and presenter
- Jo Giles – television presenter and former representative sportswoman
- Polly Gillespie – radio host
- Amanda Gillies – political reporter
- Ewen Gilmour – comedian and television presenter
- Charlotte Glennie – journalist and presenter
- Jennie Goodwin – journalist, newsreader and continuity announcer
- Patrick Gower – political presenter, interviewer and reporter
- Steve Gray – blogger and broadcaster
- Kay Gregory – journalist and former presenter
- Airini Nga Roimata Grennell – singer, pianist, broadcaster
- Jason Gunn – television personality

== H ==
- Oriwa Tahupotiki Haddon – Methodist minister, pharmacist, artist and broadcaster
- Richard Harman – political journalist and broadcaster
- Russell Harrison – presenter, vocalist and musician
- Leigh Hart – comedian, radio broadcaster, television presenter and producer
- Robert Harte – actor and television presenter
- David Hartnell MNZM – gossip columnist, radio and television personality
- Claudette Hauiti – presenter, producer and politician
- Mikey Havoc – DJ, radio host and television personality
- John Hawkesby – television presenter
- Kate Hawkesby – television reporter, radio and television presenter
- Jean Emily Hay – teacher, broadcaster and early childhood educator
- Karyn Hay – radio and television presenter and author
- Samantha Hayes – television reporter and presenter
- Matt Heath – radio host, actor, sports commentator
- Tau Henare – talkback host and politician
- Paul Henry – television presenter and radio personality
- Dai Henwood – comedian and television presenter
- Mark Hewlett – radio and television personality (born in Zimbabwe)
- Jim Hickey – weather presenter
- Kim Hill – radio and television broadcaster
- Carol Hirschfeld – broadcaster
- Paul Holmes – radio and television presenter
- Alison Holst – food writer and television chef
- Hayley Holt – television presenter
- Jim Hopkins – known for his work in television, radio and theatre
- Brendan Horan – former weather presenter and politician
- Mike Hosking – television and radio journalist and presenter
- Brooke Howard-Smith – television presenter
- Hudson and Halls – presenters of the television cookery show Hudson & Halls
- John Hudson – journalist and television presenter

== I ==
- April Ieremia – former television host, former netball player

== J ==
- Willie Jackson – radio and television presenter and politician
- Billy T. James – entertainer, comedian, musician and actor
- Arthur Owen Jensen – musician, music tutor and promoter, critic, broadcaster, composer
- Tony Johnson – sports broadcaster
- Ian Johnstone – journalist, TV presenter and narrator

== K ==
- Oriini Kaipara – television journalist and presenter
- Miriama Kamo – television presenter, host and producer
- Raybon Kan – columnist, comedian
- Phil Keoghan – television presenter
- Grant Kereama – radio personality
- Graham Kerr – television cooking personality
- Phil Kerslake – leadership coach, speaker, author and television presenter
- Ruud Kleinpaste – television presenter

== L ==
- Ken Laban – sports broadcaster (rugby)
- Mary Lambie – television presenter
- Candy Lane – Dancing with the Stars co–host
- Michael Laws – radio personality
- Bob Leahy – radio and television broadcaster
- Mark Leishman – television presenter, producer, director
- Phillip Leishman – television personality
- Shimpal Lelisi – actor and television presenter
- Vicki Lin – television presenter and actor
- Alister Murray Linton – surveyor, local politician, land officer, community leader, horticulturist and broadcaster
- Chic Littlewood – television entertainer and actor
- Richard Long – former newsreader
- Zane Lowe – BBC Radio One DJ, record producer and television presenter
- Marcus Lush – local politician, radio host and television presenter

== M ==
- Robbie Magasiva – actor and television presenter
- Toni Marsh – weather presenter and radio news reader
- Marama Martin – news reader, continuity announcer
- Paul Martin – radio presenter
- Colin Mathura-Jeffree – television presenter and host
- Alison Mau – television presenter
- Gary McCormick – poet, radio and television personality, debater and raconteur
- Darren McDonald – television news anchor
- Hamish McKay – television presenter, sportscaster, rugby editor and sports journalist
- Matty McLean – television presenter
- Anita McNaught – TVNZ and BBC World newsreader (born in England)
- Bob McNeil – television journalist
- Sacha McNeil – journalist and news presenter
- Mike McRoberts – television journalist and presenter
- Andrea McVeigh – sports broadcaster and former netball player
- Simon Mercep – news reporter, journalist
- Kevin Milne – television presenter
- Anika Moa – television presenter and musician
- Peter Montgomery – sports broadcaster
- Graeme Moody – sports broadcaster
- Jim Mora – television and radio presenter
- Stacey Morrison – television and radio host
- Alan Edward Mulgan – journalist, writer and broadcaster
- Jesse Mulligan – television host and radio broadcaster
- Herbert David Mullon – postal worker, broadcaster, philatelist and historian
- Lesley Murdoch – international sports broadcaster

== N ==
- Geeling Ng – model, actress, restaurateur and television presenter
- Grant Nisbett – sports broadcaster

== O ==
- Margaret Kathleen O'Brien – dance teacher, hostess, radio presenter and film director
- Tova O'Brien – television reporter, later Newshub political editor
- Karen O'Leary – comedian, actor and former television presenter of Paddy Gower Has Issues
- Bernadine Oliver-Kerby – television and radio broadcaster

== P ==
- Bob Parker – broadcaster and politician
- Steve Parr – television and radio presenter
- Veeshayne Patuwai – television presenter, actress, emcee and singer
- Suzanne Paul – television infomercial presenter
- Joanna Paul-Robie – television news presenter
- Inez Isabel Maud Peacocke – teacher, novelist and broadcaster
- Arthur Fairchild Pearce – clerk, jazz specialist, broadcaster and pianist
- Amber Peebles – television presenter and former Miss New Zealand
- Lindsay Perigo – television and radio broadcasting personality
- Brian Perkins – BBC Radio Four newsreader and announcer
- Wendy Petrie – television news reader and presenter
- Brendon Pongia – television presenter and basketball player
- Antonia Prebble – actress and television presenter
- Jono Pryor – radio DJ/television presenter
- Mike Puru – radio DJ/presenter and television presenter

== Q ==
- Keith Quinn – radio and television sports commentator and presenter

== R ==
- Bill Ralston – journalist, broadcaster, and media personality, active in television, radio and print
- Cherry Raymond – current affairs interviewer, game show participant
- Jason Reeves – radio broadcaster and television presenter
- Mark Richardson – radio and television presenter and former cricketer
- Matthew Ridge – television presenter, former All Black, and international rugby league captain

== S ==
- Mark Sainsbury – current affairs television presenter
- Ric Salizzo – sports presenter, producer
- Andrew Saville – radio and television sports presenter
- Eion Scarrow – gardening personality, broadcaster and author
- Colin Scrimgeour – "Uncle Scrim", methodist minister and broadcaster
- Haydn Sherley – radio broadcaster
- Maiki Sherman - television journalist and former TVNZ political editor
- Philip Sherry – television newsreader and network news anchor
- Peter ('Pete') Sinclair – television presenter
- Slave & Otis – hip hop MCs and television and radio presenters
- Aaron Slight – former professional motorcycle road racer and television presenter
- Rachel Smalley – current affairs presenter, interviewer
- Kerry Smith – actor, radio and television broadcaster
- Leighton Smith – talkback radio host
- Merv Smith – former long term breakfast radio presenter
- Barry Soper – journalist on radio and television
- Iain Stables – radio and television personality
- Percy Ronald Stevens – mechanic and radio broadcaster
- Dougal Stevenson – television newsreader and network news anchor
- Toni Street – television presenter and sports commentator
- Jenny Suo – television presenter, newsreader, weather rapper and sports commentator

== T ==
- Dylan Taite – television presenter and interviewer
- Jack Tame – television and radio journalist and presenter
- John Tamihere – politician, television and radio personality and political commentator
- Ian Taylor – business and former television presenter
- Ramon Te Wake – documentarian, singer-songwriter and television presenter
- Sara Tetro – model, television presenter, actress, and entrepreneur
- Jay Tewake – actor, singer-songwriter, model and television presenter
- Hilary Timmins – television presenter
- Belinda Todd – radio and television presenter, screenwriter
- Selwyn Toogood – television and radio presenter
- Harold Bertram Turbott – doctor, public health administrator, broadcaster and writer

== U ==
- Tui Uru – first Māori television presenter (October 1964)

== V ==
- Nic Vallance – conservationist and television presenter
- Jordan Vandermade – television presenter
- Dayna Vawdrey – television presenter
- Tony Veitch – television presenter and radio personality

== W ==
- Bryan Waddle – sports broadcaster
- Neil Waka – television presenter
- Arnold Wall – university professor, philologist, poet, mountaineer, botanist, writer and radio broadcaster
- Louise Wallace – television presenter and reporter
- Jeremy Wells – host of Eating Media Lunch and Seven Sharp
- Pippa Wetzell – television host and presenter
- Guy Williams – comedian and presenter for New Zealand Today
- Paul Williams – comedian and presenter of Taskmaster New Zealand
- Peter Williams – former TVNZ news presenter, talkback host at Magic Talk
- Tim Wilson – TVNZ reporter and Newstalk ZB host
- Susan Wood – radio host and television

== Y ==
- Lindsay Yeo – radio host
- Eric Young – radio and television presenter
