= The Lowdown (website) =

The Lowdown is a New Zealand website developed by the New Zealand Ministry of Health's National Depression Initiative (NDI). The website launched on 3 December 2007.

== Mission ==
The Lowdown aims to help young New Zealanders understand and recover from depression. It does this through online support services and testimonials from New Zealand celebrities.

== Features ==
Navigators

The user can choose from one of four celebrity navigators who tell users how to use the website. There is also a "go alone" option.

Information and Help

The website has depression-related fact sheets and contact lists, as well as online self-tests.

Stories

The Lowdown has video of New Zealand celebrities and musicians talking about how they or someone they know made it through depression. Users can also add their own stories by submitting video or text.

Chat

Users can chat together in a style similar to a bulletin board.

Multimedia

Users can listen to streaming songs from contributing musicians.

Interface

The website uses flash built on ActionScript 3. It uses the Sandy 3D engine.

== List of celebrities contributing to The Lowdown ==
=== Musicians ===
Name	Band
Boh Runga	Stellar*
P-Money	DJ
Scribe	Rapper
Dave Gibson	Elemeno P
Brad Carter	Steriogram
Young Sid	Rapper
Awa and Junior	Nesian Mystik
Paul Roper	The Mint Chicks
Joel Little	Goodnight Nurse
Gareth Stake & Angelo Munro	The Bleeders
Jason Kerrison	Opshop
Julia Deans	Fur Patrol
Tau Manukia	Spacifix
Tim Arnold	Pluto
Francis Kora	Kora
Sam & Jessie Smith	Streetwise Scarlet
Andrew Morrison	False Start
Jon Austin	48 May
Victoria Girling-Butcher	Lucid 3
Ben Read	8 Foot Sativa
Savage	Deceptikonz

=== TV and Radio ===
Name	Occupation
Aidee Walker	Outrageous Fortune Actress
Antonia Prebble	Outrageous Fortune Actress
Nisha Madhan	Shortland Street Actress
Lee Donoghue	Shortland Street Actor
Kimberley Crossman	Shortland Street Actress
Jaquie Brown	Television Presenter
Sonia Gray	Television Presenter
Jane Yee	Television Presenter
Phil Bostwick	C4 Presenter
Dayna Vawdrey	Studio 2 Presenter
Tamati Coffey	Breakfast Presenter
Bill & Ben	Pulp Sport Presenters
Mike Puru	The Edge DJ

=== Other ===
Name	Occupation
Tofiga Fepulea'i	The Laughing Samoans Member
Ma'a Nonu	Ex All Black
Lisa Li	Miss Chinese NZ
Adrian Hailwood	Fashion Designer
