= Bird of the Year =

Annual competition in New Zealand

- Te Manu Rongonui o Te Tau
- Incumbent; Black robin since September 2026
- Term length: 1 year
- Inaugural holder: Tūī
- Formation: October 2005
- Website: birdoftheyear.org.nz

Bird of the Year (Māori: Te Manu Rongonui o te Tau) is an annual election-based competition run by the New Zealand conservation organisation Forest & Bird to elect a New Zealand native "Bird of the Year". The competition is intended to raise awareness of the conservation threats to many endangered native birds.

It draws support from celebrities including politicians, artists, actors, and television personalities. The election is a significant social media and public event in New Zealand; there are regular attempts at voter fraud, and some winners (such as the long-tailed bat) have been controversial. In 2023, a TV campaign by British-American comedian John Oliver for the pūteketeke drew international attention to the contest, leading it to win with more than 290,000 votes.

== History ==
Bird of the Year (BOTY) was first launched in October 2005 by Michael Szabo, editor of Forest & Bird at the time, initially as an online poll featured in Forest & Bird's first email newsletter; votes were collected by email and through the post. Szabo noticed the public outcry when RNZ considered dropping bird calls from its daily Morning Report, and decided to tap into this public interest with an annual poll. The first BOTY contest included 76 native bird species and received a total of 900 votes; the tūī was the winner. BOTY was later championed by Forest & Bird's communications manager Helen Bain, who saw it as a "light-hearted…way of raising the profile of native birds and the threats to them".

In 2014, the competition was temporarily retitled to Seabird of the Year and only seabirds were eligible. In 2023 the competition was dubbed Bird of the Century (Te Manu Rongonui o te Rautau) to coincide with Forest & Bird's centennial celebrations, and for the first time included extinct birds: laughing owl, South Island snipe, huia, South Island kōkako, and bush wren.

Between 2022 and 2024, voters used the Forest & Bird website to rank their top-five choices for Bird of the Year. The winner was determined using the instant-runoff voting method.

Because of the transferable voting system, the Bird of the Year was not necessarily the species receiving the most number-one votes in those years. For example in BOTY 2022 (starting 17 October), seventy-one species were shortlisted as candidates, and the rock wren was the winner, because it received the most and highest vote rankings, despite getting fewer #1 votes than the second-place winner, the little penguin.

Bird of the Year 2022 top 10
Bird	Number of #1 votes	Position
Pīwauwau / rock wren	2,894	1st
Kororā / little penguin	3,351	2nd
Kea	1,852	3rd
Karure / kakaruia / Chatham Island black robin	1,594	4th
Tawaki piki toka / rockhopper penguin	1,468	5th
Pīwakawaka / fantail	1,228	6th
Hihi / stitchbird	1,302	7th
Kārearea / New Zealand falcon	1,260	8th
Pūteketeke / Australasian crested grebe	1,184	9th
Titipounamu / rifleman	1,477	10th

Bird of the Century 2023 top 10
Bird	Number of #1 votes	Position
Pūteketeke / Australasian crested grebe	290,374	1st
North Island Brown Kiwi	12,904	2nd
Kea	12,060	3rd
Kākāpō	10,889	4th
Pīwakawaka / Fantail	7,857	5th
Tawaki piki toka / Rockhopper penguin	6,763	6th
Karure / kakaruia / Chatham Island black robin	6,753	7th
Huia	6,467	8th
Tūī	6,457	9th
Takahē	6,292	10th

Bird of the Year 2024 top 10
Bird	Number of #1 votes	Position
Hoiho / yellow-eyed penguin	6,328	1st
Karure / kakaruia / Chatham Island black robin	5,442	2nd
Kākāpō	4,548	3rd
Ruru / Morepork	4,467	4th
Kea	4,206	5th
Pīwakawaka / Fantail	4,205	6th
Takahē	3,892	7th
Tawaki piki toka / Rockhopper penguin	3,834	8th
Kōkako	3,445	9th
Toroa / Antipodean albatross	3,415	10th

The 2025 competition returned to a "First-Past-the-Post" FPTP system, but still with the option for voters to pick up to five birds. Each choice made is worth 1 point toward that bird's overall total.

Bird of the Year 2025 top 10
Bird	Number of votes	Position
Kārearea / New Zealand falcon	14,317	1st
Kea	12,506	2nd
Karure / kakaruia / Chatham Island black robin	11,726	3rd
Kākāpō	10,792	4th
Ruru / Morepork	10,174	5th
Tawaki piki toka / Rockhopper penguin	10,030	6th
Pīwakawaka / Fantail	9,915	7th
Takahē	9,828	8th
Hihi / stitchbird	8,885	9th
Hoiho / yellow-eyed penguin	8,665	10th

Bird of the Year runs for two weeks in September to November each year, and around 70 species usually compete. Anyone can nominate themselves as a "campaign manager" for a bird, and organise social media publicity campaign. The competition is not restricted to New Zealand: anyone with a valid email address is able to cast a vote, which became critical to the 2023 landslide victory of the Pūteketeke.

== List of winners ==
Bird of the year
No.	Portrait	Name	Year	Votes	% of vote
1		Tūī	2005	865	20
2		Pīwakawaka	2006	458	
3		Riroriro	2007		
4		Kākāpō	2008	578	
5		Kiwi	2009	1,586	
6		Kākāriki	2010	6,921	33
7		Pūkeko	2011	1,480	
8		Kārearea	2012	1,261	
9		Mohua	2013	2,473	19
10		Tara-iti	2014		
11		Kūaka	2015	1,957	15
12		Kōkako	2016	3,614	18
13		Kea	2017	7,311	18
14		Kererū	2018	5,833	12
15		Hoiho	2019	12,022	28
(4)		Kākāpō	2020	10,773	20
16		Pekapeka	2021	7,031	12
17		Pīwauwau	2022	2,894	5.6
18		Pūteketeke	2023	290,374	83
(15)		Hoiho	2024	6,328	
(8)		Kārearea	2025	14,317	
19		Black robin	2026	26,000+	

== Controversies ==
- 2008: The successful campaign to elect kākāpō was accused by the takahē of accepting undeclared donations "from wealthy migratory birds living in Monaco." It was cleared by the fictional Serious Feathered Fraud Office.
- 2010: The kākāriki was accused of rigging the vote. Forest & Bird confirmed these concerns in 2011, committing to improving vote security.
- 2011: The emperor penguin was added to the competition for one year, when a juvenile bird, dubbed Happy Feet, was found on the Kāpiti Coast. It had made national and international headlines after being rescued.
- 2015: Two teenagers from Auckland made over 200 fraudulent votes for the kōkako. They used their father's business account to make fake email addresses.
- 2017: The competition suffered a further voting scandal when 112 fraudulent votes were made for the white-faced heron using internet bots from an IP address in Christchurch.
- 2018: An independent scrutineer from Dragonfly Data Science was brought in to prevent further voting scandals. Despite this, a third voting scandal surfaced when 310 fraudulent votes were placed for the black shag. These were traced to Australia.
- 2019: A larger than usual number of Russian votes drew conspiracy theories alleging Russian interference despite Russians providing only 335 votes. A spokesperson for Forest and Bird concluded the votes appeared to be legitimate and suggested it was innocent interest from ornithologists in the country.
- 2020: 1500 votes were placed for the little spotted kiwi using fake email addresses from the same IP address, briefly pushing it to the top of the leaderboard before the fraudulent votes were discovered.
- 2021: The long-tailed bat was added to the competition with mixed responses from candidates and voters, who criticised the fact that it was not in fact a bird. Despite this controversy, the entry ended up winning 2021 Bird of the Year.
- 2022: The kākāpō, a previous two-time winner of BOTY, was barred from competing again.
- 2023: Television comedian John Oliver announced on his HBO show Last Week Tonight that he was the campaign manager for the Southern crested grebe or pūteketeke. Oliver erected billboards in Wellington, Paris, Tokyo, London, Mumbai, and Manitowoc, and arranged for an aeroplane with a pūteketeke banner to fly over Ipanema Beach in Brazil. He also appeared on Jimmy Fallon’s The Tonight Show in a pūteketeke costume. So many votes were received—over 350,000, from 195 countries—that Forest & Bird's website crashed and the results of the competition had to be delayed by two days while verification was carried out. The previous record for verified votes was 56,733 in 2021. The pūteketeke won by a landslide, receiving 290,374 votes, over 100 times those of the previous year's winner, and far more than the second-placing North Island brown kiwi with 12,904. The contest was also marred by fraud, with 40,000 votes cast by one person for the eastern rockhopper penguin. A Pennsylvania voter cast 3,403 fraudulent votes, with one arriving every three seconds. Forty-five of the verified votes were cast under the name "John Oliver", one of them for the fairy tern, and the rest for the pūteketeke. Forest & Bird claimed to be pleased by Oliver's campaign, as it furthered the contest's basic environmental awareness purpose by encouraging international attention. The organisation received over $600,000 in donations, six times the previous record, as a result of the campaign.

== Celebrity endorsements ==
Year	Birds endorsed	Celebrity/organisation
2024	Hoiho	Helen Clark, Chris Hipkins, Jane Goodall, Phil Keoghan
2023	Pūteketeke	John Oliver
2022	Wrybill	Christopher Luxon
2021	Kea	Jenny-May Clarkson, Kiri Allan
2021	Royal Spoonbill	David Seymour, Melissa Stokes
2021	New Zealand dotterel	Green Party of Aotearoa New Zealand
2021	Long-tailed Bat	Radio One 91FM
2020	South Island Kōkako	Ruud Kleinpaste
2018	Tāiko/Black Petrel	Jacinda Ardern
2014	Australasian gannet	Matt Watson
2014	Brown skua	Metiria Turei
2014	Northern royal albatross	Peter Dunne
2014	Buller's shearwater	Winston Peters
2013	Mōhua	Metiria Turei
2013	New Zealand fairy tern	Hayley Holt
2011	Ruru/Morepork	Phil Goff
2011	Yellow-eyed penguin	Anton Oliver
2011	Kererū	Hinewehi Mohi
2011	Kōkako	Hollie Smith
2011	New Zealand robin	Lisa Chapell
2011	New Zealand fantail	Kate Wilkinson
2011	Ruru/Morepork	Maisey Rika
2011	New Zealand falcon	Pita Sharples
2011	Kea	Rachel Smalley
2011	Takahē	Riki Gooch
2011	Tūī	Russel Norman
2011	Kākāriki	Seth Haapu
2011	Wandering albatross	Steve Abel
2010	Weka	Don McGlashan
2010	Black stilt	Grahame Sydney
2010	Ruru/Morepork	Jerome Chandrahasen
2010	New Zealand fantail	Taika Waititi
2010	Kererū	Kiri Te Kanawa
2009	Pūkeko	Damian Christie
2009	Kākā	David Farrar
2009	Royal spoonbill	Jeremy Wells
2009	Pied stilt	Sam Hunt
2009	New Zealand fantail	Kim Hill
2009	Kererū	Kiri Te Kanawa
2008	Pied stilt	Sam Hunt
2008	Tūī	Sam Morgan
2008	Yellow-eyed penguin	Anton Oliver
2008	Kererū	Barnaby Weir
2008	Tūī	Irene van Dyk
2008	Kea	Jason Gunn
2008	Grey warbler	Graeme Hill
2008	Kiwi	John Key
2008	Weka	Anand Satyanand
2008	White-faced heron	Steve Braunias
2008	Southern royal albatross	Tui De Roy
2008	Weka	Anand Satyanand
2008	Albatross	Susan Satyanand
2008	Tūī	Petra Bagust
2008	Kea	Peter Hillary
2006	Kōtare/Sacred kingfisher	Annabel Langbein
2006	Ruru/Morepork	Caroline Church
2006	Kākāpō	Chris Carter
2006	Kōtuku	Don Brash
2006	Kākāpō	Helen Clark
2006	Kererū	Jeanette Fitzsimmons
2006	Kōkako	Susan Satyanand
2006	New Zealand fantail	Lois Daish
2006	Tūī	Mark Sainsbury
2006	Kāhu	Pita Sharples
2006	Tūī	Rodney Hide
2006	Kiwi	Ruud Kleinpaste
2006	Weka	Anand Satyanand
