= Capital Gains (radio show) =

British radio comedy series, 1994-1997

- Genre: Comedy radio
- Running time: 30 minutes
- Country of origin: United Kingdom
- Language: English
- Home station: BBC Radio 4
- Hosted by: Brian Perkins
- Starring: Peter Jones
- Written by: Collin Johnson
- Produced by: Andy Jordan (series 1 and 2); David Blount (series 2)
- Original release: 5 April 1994 – 14 August 1997
- No. of episodes: 9

Capital Gains is a British radio comedy series which aired originally between 1994 and 1997. There were nine half-hour episodes broadcast on BBC Radio 4. It starred Peter Jones and was written by Collin Johnson.

== Plot synopsis ==
Retired widower Julius Hutch (played by Peter Jones) is beset by bills he cannot pay. Unexpectedly, a large sum of money is paid into his bank account by a foreign merchant bank. When queried, the overseas bank insists that no mistake has been made, so he sets out to spend his windfall of four million pounds.

The episodes of the first series explore the unanticipated problems which arise for both millionaire Julius Hutch and the merchant bank as a consequence of the unexpected credit transfer, when he attempts to use his windfall to help other people. In the second series, where he accidentally becomes a billionaire, Julius devotes his new found financial muscle to supporting worthwhile ecological causes, with further unexpected consequences.

This is fundamentally a comedy about the small man versus big business. The humour arises because his unexpected wealth enables the little man to give his corporate opponents a good run for their money! The first series deals with Julius Hutch versus a banking corporation and the second series deals with Hutch taking on a property developer.

Writer Collin Johnson plays various small parts in the episodes throughout both the first and second series. The show is also to some extent a romcom, as both series also explore Hutch's developing romance with a lady named Pauline. She works in the local branch of his High Street bank, played by Celestine Randall. His daughter from his first marriage, Kate, is played by Justine Midda. BBC announcer Brian Perkins plays small parts in some episodes in addition to his regular announcing duties on the show.

== Cast ==
- Peter Jones as Julius Hutch (series 1, episodes 1–4; series 2, episodes 1, 3 and 4)
- Celestine Randall as Pauline Tone (series 1 and 2)
- Justine Midda as Kate (series 1 and 2)
- Jeffrey Wickham as Sexton Lewis (series 1, episodes 1, 3 and 4; series 2, episodes 1–4)
- Stephen Thorne as Sir Gainford Blounty (series 2)
- Jullie Meers as Dahlia Sprout (series 2)
- Hugh Dickson as the Colonel (series 2, episode 4)
- Toni Barry as Liz Dangerfield (series 2, episode 4)
- Collin Johnson as Creditor (series 1, episode 2), News Reader (series 1, episode 1, 3 and 4), Haiku Jack (series 2, episode 2 and 4)
- Peter Whitman as Creditor (series 1, episode 2), Peter Fang (series 1, episodes 3 and 4)
- Brian Perkins as Himself (series 2)
- David Holt as Ted Smoothie (series 2, episode 2 and 3)

== Episodes ==
A pilot episode aired on 5 April 1994 in a Radio 4 FM slot entitled Thirty Minute Theatre: Capital Gains. It was subsequently aired as the second episode of Series 1, in 1995, and because of this it was the only episode not to carry an individual episode title.

=== Series one ===
No. overall	No. in series	Title	Written by	Original release date
1	1	"Risk Capital"	Collin Johnson	6 April 1995
2	2	"Untitled"	Collin Johnson	13 April 1995
3	3	"Venture Capital"	Collin Johnson	20 April 1995
4	4	"Capital Return"	Collin Johnson	27 April 1995

=== Series two ===
No. overall	No. in series	Title	Written by	Original release date
5	1	"Seed Capital"	Collin Johnson	24 July 1997
6	2	"Stake Capital"	Collin Johnson	31 July 1997
7	3	"Development Capital"	Collin Johnson	7 August 1997
8	4	"Political Capital"	Collin Johnson	14 August 1997
