= John Hudson (journalist) =

New Zealand journalist (born 1956)

- Born: May 30, 1956 (age 70)
- Occupation: Reporter
- Years active: 1975–present
- Employer: TVNZ
- Known for: Sunday
- Partner: Lauren Young
- Children: Holly Adelaide Hudson, Jamieson Learmonth Hudson

John Hudson (born 30 May 1956) is a reporter on Television New Zealand's "Sunday" programme.

His career began with the New Zealand Herald in 1975, and he later worked at Radio Hauraki and 89FM. After working for the BBC for a few years, he joined Television New Zealand in 1984.

== Education ==
John Hudson received his education from the University of Auckland, where he studied art history, English, and politics. He also played for the rugby team at the university.

== Experience ==
John Hudson has had the following experience:

- Reporter at 89fm
- Script editor at Visnews
- newshound at Radio Hauraki
- Reporter at New Zealand Herald

== See also ==
- Sunday
- List of New Zealand television personalities
