= Jim Mora =

Jim Mora is the name of:

- Jim E. Mora (born 1935), former head coach of the NFL's New Orleans Saints and Indianapolis Colts, and the USFL's Philadelphia/Baltimore Stars
- Jim L. Mora (born 1961), football head coach at Colorado State University, former head coach at the University of Connecticut, and UCLA. Former NFL coach, and son of Jim E. Mora
- Jim Mora (broadcaster), New Zealand television and radio presenter
