= Lowdown =

Lowdown may refer to:

== Music ==
- "Lowdown" (Chicago song), 1971
- "Lowdown" (Boz Scaggs song), 1976
- "Lowdown" (Xample song), 2007
- "Lowdown", a song by Tom Waits from the 2006 album Orphans: Brawlers, Bawlers & Bastards
- Lowdown Suite, a 2003 album by Moka Only, and the title track
- Lowdown Suite 2… The Box, a 2009 album by Moka Only, and the song "It’s Lowdown"

== Other uses ==
- Lo Down, a short lived pro wrestling tag team
- Low Down, a 2014 American biopic film about jazz singer Joe Albany
- The Lowdown 91.1, a radio station in Grand Theft Auto V hosted by Pam Grier
- The Lowdown (website), a website about depression developed by the New Zealand Ministry of Health
- Lowdown (TV series), an Australian comedy series
- The Lowdown (British TV series), a British documentary series first broadcast in 1988
- The Lowdown (American TV series), a 2025 American television series
