= BOTY =

BOTY or Boty may refer to:

- Battle of the Year, a breakdancing competition
- Bird of the Year, for birds native to New Zealand
- Breakthrough of the Year, an award given by the journal Science
- Pauline Boty (1938–1966), British painter
