= Matt Gibb =

New Zealand broadcaster

Matthew Gibb
- Born: 15 January 1981; Christchurch, New Zealand
- Other names: Matt Gibb
- Education: Burnside High School, Christchurch
- Years active: 2000 - present
- Employer: Television New Zealand
- Known for: Studio 2 U Live

Matthew Phillip "Matt" Gibb (born 15 January 1981) is a television presenter in Auckland, New Zealand. He is best known for presenting the children's television show Studio 2 from 2004 until 2010.

In 2015 Gibb was also a regular presenter for a segment on Kiwi Living, a New Zealand lifestyle television programme. He also fronted the Telecom campaign "Tech in a Sec" and has been known to host the weekly Lotto draw, and had a stint co-presenting the breakfast television programme Good Morning.

== Career ==
Gibb's first television appearance was as the host of Squirt. In 2004 he was a co-host on the popular children's show Studio 2 until the series ended in October 2010.

Gibb then worked as an on-screen producer for U Live on TVNZ U. Gibb also worked as the fill-in host and contributor on the breakfast show Good Morning. He also presented the Telecom campaign "Tech in a Sec", and occasionally hosted the weekly Lotto draw.

In 2015 Gibb began presenting pre-recorded segments about travel and unique homes on the New Zealand lifestyle programme Kiwi Living. Later that year, he announced he would be giving up his presenting work in New Zealand to move to Sydney, Australia, after his fiancée (a reporter for 1News) landed a job as an Australian correspondent.

Gibb was a radio co-host on The Breakfast Club on More FM, alongside Lana Searle and Gary McCormick.

== Personal life ==
Gibb was born and raised in Christchurch, New Zealand. He attended Burnside High School. He lived with his parents as a young adult, working for Family Planning as part of the youth education team and performing in the improvisation comedy Scared Scriptless.

== Filmography ==
Television
Year	Show	Role	Notes
2000–2003	Squirt	Himself	Host
2004–2010	Studio 2 LIVE	Himself	Host
2009	Activate	Himself	Host
2011–2013	U Live	Himself	On-screen producer
2012–2015	Good Morning	Himself	Fill-in host, contributor
2013	U Late	Himself	Fill-in on-screen producer; 2 episodes
2013	Seven Sharp	Himself	Fill-in host
2013–2015	Lotto	Himself	Host
2014	There And Back	Himself	Host
2015	Kiwi Living	Himself	Contributor
2015–present	Breakfast	Himself	Fill-in host, fill-in weather presenter
2017	The Barefoot Bandits	Mr. Renwick (voice)	Series 2

Radio
Year	Radio Station	Role	Notes
2017–2018	The Edge	Himself	Host
2021–October 2021	More FM	Himself	Co-Host

Advertisements
Year	Advertisement	Role
2012–present	Spark's "Tech In A Sec"	Himself

== See also ==
- List of New Zealand television personalities
