= Tina Carline =

New Zealand television and radio broadcaster (1948–2020)

- Born: Christina Mei Ngaparu; 1948; Wellington, New Zealand
- Died: 27 February 2020 (aged 71–72); Gold Coast, Queensland, Australia
- Known for: First weather presenter on TV One

Christina Mei Carline (née Ngaparu; 1948 – 27 February 2020) was a New Zealand television and radio broadcaster. She was the first weather presenter on TV One after the dissolution of the NZBC in 1975.

== Early life and family ==
Born in Wellington in 1948 of Māori descent, Carline affiliated to Ngāti Tūwharetoa, Te Arawa, and Ngāti Raukawa. She was the daughter of Huitao and Barbara Duff Ngaparu, growing up in the Hutt Valley and being educated at Upper Hutt College, where she was named as best speaker in the school debating club in 1965.

After leaving school, Ngaparu trained as a bookkeeping machinist. In 1970, she was one of 14 hostesses at the New Zealand Expo '70 pavilion in Osaka for seven months, and then travelled in Europe and North America for three months.

== Broadcasting career ==
When she returned to New Zealand, Ngaparu joined the NZBC in Wellington at the end of 1970, and after a course at the broadcasting training school, worked as an announcer on radio stations 2ZB, 2ZM and 2YA, and as a continuity announcer and weather presenter on WNTV1.

After marrying and moving to Rotorua, Carline was persuaded to return to Wellington to present the weather on TV One, broadcast from the Avalon Studios in the Hutt Valley. She was the first weather presenter on the new nationally networked channel, and shared the role with Sue Scott until the early 1980s.

Carline is noted for regularly using the Māori language greeting "kia ora" in her broadcasts. Along with Marama Martin, she is credited as being a trailblazer for Māori broadcasters.

== Later life ==
Carline moved to Australia, and undertook university studies as a mature student. She earned a bachelor's degree in linguistics and a master's in peace and education studies, and also qualified as a teacher of English as a second language. She taught English as a second language to students ranging in age from seven to 15 years, before working at Central Queensland University on the Gold Coast and Brisbane as a guidance officer for international students. She also worked as a real estate agent for a time.

Carline settled in Runaway Bay, Queensland, and was active in Toastmasters with Runaway Toastmasters Club in Runaway Bay, serving as the club's inaugural vice president of education in 2000, and as club president from 2001 to 2002.

Carline died of cancer on 27 February 2020.
