= Saturday Disney (New Zealand TV series) =

- Starring: Vicki Lin; Jermaine Leef
- Country of origin: New Zealand

Original release
- Network: TVNZ
- Release: 2004 – 2006

Saturday Disney is a New Zealand Saturday morning children's series. The last episode aired in 2006, with its replacement being a Saturday edition of Studio 2, called Studio 2 Saturday.
