= Christian Broadcasting Association =

New Zealand radio production company

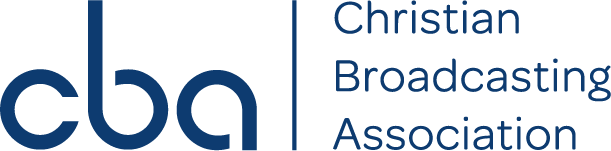
- Industry: Broadcasting
- Headquarters: Auckland, New Zealand
- Area served: New Zealand
- Website: cba.org.nz

The Christian Broadcasting Association (CBA) is a New Zealand non-profit radio production company, set up to produce Christian programmes for secular radio stations and non-Christian audiences. It predominantly produces programmes for Newstalk ZB and Radio Sport. According to the association's website, it aims to "share the heart of the Christian faith in mainstream media".

The association's programmes are presented by a range of announcers with secular broadcasting experience, including parenting advisers Ian Grant and John Cowan, writer John Cooney, documentary maker Rob Harley, TV personality Petra Bagust, minister Frank Ritchie, media consultant Tim Sisarich, One News reporter Joy Reid, voice talent Julia Bloore and TV personality Dayna Vawdrey. Many staff, volunteers and supporters have also been involved in Rhema Media, an interdenominational Christian broadcasting company.

CBA receives funding from donations as well as from NZ On Air. The organisation received $82,000 in the 2013-14 financial year, out of a total radio production funding pool of $345,175.

== History ==
CBA was set up by John Hawkesby in the 1970s. In its early years it produced radio programmes on Radio Hauraki and then the ZB network. Since 1996, its radio programmes and radio features have been broadcast nationwide on Newstalk ZB. In 2000, it began producing a 12 hours Good Friday and Christmas Day programme for broadcast on Newstalk ZB and Radio Sport. In 2011, the programme was extended to 24 hours.

The association awards three $2,500 scholarships to Christian media students each year. The scholarship are intended for students pursuing tertiary study in secular broadcasting, with the aim of pursuing a career in mainstream, non-Christian media. They are issued to get more Christians in positions of leadership in the mass media. Recipients must be 18 to 35 years of age, and a member of a "bone fide Christian denomination or community". The scholarship can be used to cover the costs of study at the New Zealand Broadcasting School at the Christchurch Polytechnic Institute of Technology.

A 2013 Easter special on religious music in the film Les Misérables, entitled Les Misérables with Petra Bagust, was a finalist for Best Music Special at the New York Festivals World's Best Radio Programs awards. An hour-long 2013 Christmas-themed show, Newstalk BC, won gold for Best Director and Best Talk/Interview Special, silver for Best Performance by an Actor and Best Religious Program, and was a finalist for Best Drama Special, Best Editing and Best Entertainment Programme Production. In 2015, CBA also won Best Documentary at the NZ Radio Awards and two more Gold awards at the New York Festivals in the categories of Best Children/Young Adult Program for The Crazy Kiwi Christmas Kids Show and Best Writing for a new and improved version of Newstalk BC.

== Programmes ==
=== Real Life ===
CBA produces Real Life with John Cowan, a weekly Sunday night interview show on Newstalk ZB. The half-hour show features an in-depth discussion between Cowan and a high-profile guest, covering their career, personal life and religious beliefs. Previous guests have included astronaut Buzz Aldrin, musician Cliff Richard, actors Ian McKellen and Sam Neill, satirist John Clarke, Flight of the Conchords star Jemaine Clement, former Australian prime minister Kevin Rudd and US Republican presidential candidate Ben Carson.

The programme has interviewed all eight of the last New Zealand prime ministers — David Lange, Geoffrey Palmer, Mike Moore, Jim Bolger, Jenny Shipley, Helen Clark, John Key and Bill English. It has interviewed all recent opposition leaders — Don Brash, Phil Goff, David Shearer, David Cunliffe, Andrew Little and Jacinda Ardern. Political party leaders Jeanette Fitzsimons, Russel Norman, Metiria Turei, James Shaw, Winston Peters, Rodney Hide, David Seymour, Tariana Turia, Pita Sharples, Hone Harawira and Colin Craig have appeared on the show. The programme has featured mayors like Bob Parker, Lianne Dalziel, Celia Wade-Brown, Len Brown and Tim Shadbolt, and veteran politicians like Roger Douglas, Lockwood Smith, Jim Anderton and Annette King.

Rugby players and coaches are regularly featured on the show. Colin Meads, Graham Henry, John Kirwan, Michael Jones, Anton Oliver, Grant Fox, Mark "Bull" Allen, Buck Shelford, Marc Ellis, Nick Farr-Jones, Gordon Tietjens, Ruben Wiki, John Hart, Norm Hewitt and Grant Fox have all appeared. Other sports stars have also been interviewed, including yachtsman Dean Barker, football player Wynton Rufer, basketballer Kirk Penney, netballer Irene van Dyk, cricketers Martin Snedden and Martin Crowe, racing drivers Greg Murphy and Scott Dixon, athlete Peter Snell, boxers Monty Betham and David Tua, cyclist Sarah Ulmer, shotputter Valerie Adams and rower Rob Waddell.

Real Life has told the life stories of public figures. Former Governor-General Silvia Cartwright, Queen's Counsel Peter Williams, lawyer Mai Chen, Police Commissioner Howard Broad, conservationist Peter Bethune, youth leader Sam Johnson, veteran activist John Minto and unionist Helen Kelly have appeared on the show. Business leaders Trelise Cooper, Stephen Tindall, Peter Leitch, Theresa Gattung and Kevin Roberts have also appeared.
