= Jordan Vandermade =

New Zealand television producer and decathlete

Jordan van der Made (born 7 May 1987) is a television presenter in Auckland, New Zealand. He was a co-host on the popular children's television show Studio 2 until the series ended on 1 October 2010.

Educated at Saint Kentigern College in Auckland, he excelled in athletics, winning multiple national age-group events. His most significant achievement was winning the bronze medal in the World Junior Athletics Championship, in the decathlon event. He was also ranked number 4 in New Zealand for tennis between 12 -14 years of age.

In 2007 he was recruited by Auckland Rugby Union and was part of the Auckland Academy. He played for the University club in Auckland who were runners up in the premier grade.

He hosted the short-lived TVNZ show The Singing Bee in 2008/9.

He also currently hosts the live lottery draws for Lotto New Zealand, and is a Resident Auctioneer for UP Real Estate.

== Achievements ==
Year	Competition	Venue	Position	Event	Notes
Representing New Zealand
2004	World Junior Championships	Grosseto, Italy	16th (h)	4 × 400 m relay	3:12.88
2006	World Junior Championships	Beijing, China	3rd	Decathlon (junior)	7807 pts

== See also ==
- List of New Zealand television personalities
