= Eion Scarrow =

New Zealand gardening personality (1931 – 2013)

Eion Alexander Scarrow (9 November 1931 – 25 April 2013) was a New Zealand gardening personality, broadcaster and author.

== Biography ==
Scarrow presented the gardening show Dig This on New Zealand television from 1972 until 1986, first on regional television in Auckland and then on national network television from 1975. For 30 years he hosted radio gardening shows, and was a prolific author of gardening books, writing over 20 titles.

Scarrow died at Te Kauwhata in 2013.

== Books ==
Titles written by Scarrow include:

- New Zealand vegetable gardening guide. Books for Pleasure, Auckland (1976)
- Eion Scarrow's question & answer book on gardening. Books for Pleasure, Auckland (1977)
- New Zealand gardening under glass. Books for Pleasure, Auckland (1979)
- More questions & answers on gardening. Lansdowne, Auckland (1981)
- Eion Scarrow's Guide to gardening in New Zealand. Lansdowne, Auckland (1983)
- The complete Eion Scarrow gardening handbook. Cobb/Horwood, Auckland (1983)
- Container gardening. BCNZ Enterprises, Auckland (1985)
- Vegetable gardening. BCNZ Enterprises, Auckland (1985)
- Fruit trees. TVNZ Publishing, Auckland (1986)
- Greenhouse gardening. TVNZ Publishing, Auckland (1986)
- Lawns and ground cover. TVNZ Publishing, Auckland (1986)
- New Zealand native trees and shrubs. TVNZ Publishing, Auckland (1986)
- Eion Scarrow's guide to indoor plants. Inprint New Zealand, Wellington (1987)
- Eion Scarrow's citrus handbook. Bateman, Auckland (1992)
- Ask Eion about gardening: over 200 problems solved. Bateman, Auckland (1993)
- The complete New Zealand gardener: a practical guide (with Geoff Bryant). Bateman, Auckland (1995)

== See also ==
- List of New Zealand television personalities
