= Mucking In =

- Presented by: Jim Mora

Original release
- Network: Television New Zealand
- Release: 2000 – 2008

Related
- Ground Force; Backyard Blitz

Mucking In is a New Zealand "reality" television programme that airs on Television One. It is hosted by Jim Mora. He is assisted by gardener Tony Murrell.

The show features a very similar premise to the show Ground Force, in which a team of gardeners, and local volunteers employed by the show descend on an individual's place and improve the garden for the cameras within a specified time limit. People whose gardens are made over are nominated by the public, often for the voluntary work they have done within the community.

== See also ==
- Ground Force
- Backyard Blitz
