= Steve Gray (TV presenter) =

New Zealand television presenter (born 1965)

- Born: Steven Gray; 11 July 1965; Hamilton, New Zealand
- Occupations: Television host and blogger
- Notable credit(s): Good Morning, bFM
- Website: therealstevegray.com

Steven "Steve" Gray (born 11 July 1965) is a New Zealand blogger and broadcaster, best known as the former host and film reviewer of the weekday New Zealand morning television show, Good Morning. Before becoming a co-host, Gray was its long-serving film and DVD reviewer and gossip columnist.

Gray was raised in Hamilton, New Zealand. He worked as a barman, actor, fence builder, painter, singing telegram, drag performer and nanny before branching into film and media. He began his career reviewing film and video on student radio station bFM in 1996, and began appearing on television the following year. Steven is best known for his knowledge of musical theatre and American television series.

In December 2009, Television New Zealand decided to not renew his contract for his presenter role on Good Morning. No specific reason was given for this, but Gray later speculated it may have been due to his sexuality. Gray's final episode of Good Morning was Friday 11 December 2009.

In April 2010 Gray launched showbiz news and social commentary blog The Real Steve Gray, which has become one of the most popular New Zealand blogs.

In a January 2013 interview with Fairfax NZ, Gray claimed to have slept with a former All Black, sparking international interest from both gay and rugby media.

In 2013 Gray joined the New Zealand cinema podcast Cinematica as part of the film review panel.

== See also ==
- List of New Zealand television personalities
