= Good Morning (New Zealand TV programme) =

New Zealand TV programme (1996–2015)

- Presented by: Jeanette Thomas
- Country of origin: New Zealand

Production
- Executive producer: Sally-Anne Kerr
- Running time: 1-3 hours

Original release
- Network: TVNZ 1
- Release: April 1996 – December 2015

Good Morning is a New Zealand morning magazine lifestyle television programme, the original concept put to TVNZ Head of Programming Mike Lattin by the then Head of Production and later CEO of Avalon Studios Phil Wallbank. It aired weekday mornings from 9 am on TVNZ 1 from April 1996 to 2015. The programme was last hosted by Jeanette Thomas. Episodes typically included segments on cooking, craft, exercise, fashion and beauty, and topical discussion panels, as well as interviews with celebrities and other noteworthy people. The show was typically broadcast live, with the usual exception of advertorials that were embedded in the programme. From July 1997 to August 1999 the previous day episodes were played on TVNZ 2 at 3.30 am.

== History ==
The programme debuted in 1996, originally broadcast from Wellington, with its inaugural host Liz Gunn. Production then moved to Auckland in 1997, and the show became closely linked to its next host, Mary Lambie, who hosted the series from 1997 to 2003.

The content of the series through 1996 and 2003 at times was experimental featuring dating segments, Lambie PI, TV talkback, and Lambie's on-set cat Louis.

Production finally moved to TVNZ's Avalon Studios in Lower Hutt in 2004 when it made sense for Avalon studios to have a regular series based in Wellington.

The two-host format with Brendon Pongia and Sarah Bradley began in 2006. In 2007, the show grew from a two- to a three-hour weekday show with ONE News bulletins inserted into the programme at 10am and 11am.

In July 2007, Steve Gray, the show's long-time film and DVD reviewer (11 years) also started co-hosting the show until the end of 2009. Former ONE News reporter Hadyn Jones replaced Gray in 2010, before himself leaving after just 12 months.

In April 2011, TVNZ CEO Rick Ellis announced that as part of TVNZ's plan to sell its Avalon Studios, Good Morning would be moved to a new Auckland studio and Jeanette Thomas & Rod Cheeseman replaced Sarah Bradley & Brendon Pongia as hosts in 2012. The move had been rumoured for several years.

In 2013, the show was reduced from a three- to a one-hour weekday show and Rod Cheeseman left. The show was hosted by Jeanette Thomas, with Astar and Matai Smith, with Melanie Kerr as the Advertorial Presenter.

The show ended in December 2015.

== Hosts ==
- Liz Gunn
- Mary Lambie
- Alice Worsley
- Angela D'Audney
- Kerry Smith
- Lisa Manning
- Evie Ashton
- Jacqui Hudson
- Steve Gray
- Hadyn Jones
- Brendon Pongia
- Sarah Bradley
- Rod Cheeseman
- Astar
