= Keith Bracey =

New Zealand broadcaster

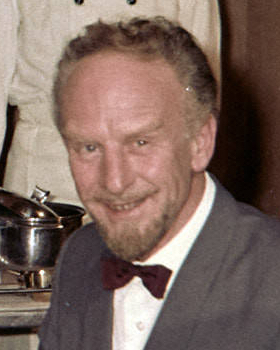
- Bracey in 1967
- Born: Keith Arthur Bracey; 3 May 1916; New Zealand
- Died: 28 October 2010 (aged 94)
- Occupations: Radio and television presenter

Keith Arthur Bracey (3 May 1916 – 28 October 2010) was a New Zealand television reporter and host who with his goatee beard was one of Television New Zealand's most recognised figures.

== Background ==
In 1966 he was the inaugural presenter for New Zealand's first daily current affairs show, Town and Around.

On 28 April 2006, a few days before he turned 90, he was at TVNZ headquarters in Auckland to celebrate the 40th anniversary of Town and Around.

== Television ==
Bracey had a fair amount of involvement with the crime fighting series, Police 5 that began in 1976 working as a presenter, producer and researcher for the show. He stayed with it until it was axed in 1986; the cancellation of the show made the front page in the news. There was talk of a replacement show of a similar nature. Also during the early 1980s he was part of a team that included John Hawkesby and Judy Bailey that started up and produced the Auckland regional magazine show Top Half.

During his career, he had an acting role, playing a druid leader on the television series Hercules: The Legendary Journeys in 1998.

== Personal life ==
Bracey was married twice and at the time of his death, he was survived by three sons and daughter.

== See also ==
- List of New Zealand television personalities
