= Alma Evans-Freke =

New Zealand television personality and actor

Alma Rae Evans-Freke (née Johnson; 30 October 1931 – 15 September 2017) was a New Zealand television personality, actor, producer, teacher and adjudicator of speech and drama and public speaking. She was the first female TV presenter in New Zealand.

She first joined broadcasting in the late 1940s at Dunedin's 4ZB as a trainee copywriter. A few years later she took up a government bursary to study drama in London. This was followed by professional theatre and teaching. In 1960 she rejoined broadcasting and was transferred to Auckland. She became New Zealand's first female television presenter, then known as a continuity announcer, on Auckland channel AKTV2 in 1961.

AKTV2 had been launched in June 1960, initially broadcasting for three hours a night, three nights a week. She began her appearance from August. She worked alongside fellow presenter, former Royal Air Force pilot Tim Evans-Freke, whom she later married.

In an interview with the New Zealand Listener in 2010, marking 50 years of television in New Zealand, she recalled those days in typically understated fashion:

Did being on television, in people's living rooms each night, make you famous?
"No, not at all. Television announcing to me was never more than just a job. We were public servants and it never occurred to any of us at the time to think of ourselves as personalities or, heaven forbid, stars."

Those early television newsreaders sounded as if they had just come out of a BBC finishing school. Was that how you were asked to talk?
"Everything was live back then so nothing was recorded. So I am pretty thankful there were no recordings kept because we would have sounded rather too precious. We were told to speak rather nicely. I think probably we were a bit stiff."

In 2000, in a television special commemorating 40 years of television in New Zealand, she recalled the first commercial spots from 1961, that went something like "the time is eight o'clock. Time for a banana."

She was a highly qualified and highly respected member of New Zealand's speech and drama community, with an extensive teaching career both in secondary schools and privately. With over 60 years' teaching experience, she was for many years an Examiner for the New Zealand Speech Board, and adjudicated at competition festivals throughout the country.

== See also ==
- List of New Zealand television personalities
