= U Live =

- Presented by: Rose Matafeo, Connor Nestor, Tim Lambourne, and Matt Gibb
- Country of origin: New Zealand
- Original language: English

Production
- Production locations: Auckland, New Zealand
- Running time: 180 minutes

Original release
- Network: TVNZ U
- Release: March 13, 2011 – August 31, 2013

U Live is the flagship show of TVNZ U, airing live from 4pm - 7pm daily. The show featured music, interviews, and other general interest content. Viewers were invited to participate via Facebook to vote in psychic readings, take part in discussions, and view the show via a live commercial- and graphic-free stream, where comments and psychic readings would then be played live. U Live was hosted by Connor Nestor, Matthew Gibb, Kirsteen Mackenzie, Eli Matthewson and Monika Barton. U Live drew many parallels to TVNZ's rival network Mediaworks' youth-oriented show FOUR Live, which aired on FOUR.

== History ==
U Live came when TVNZ was studying the feasibility of a youth-oriented channel, at a time when C4's Select Live was ending. During early pitching sessions to TVNZ, a contact at Facebook suggested the inclusion of an interactive app, touted as a world first. The goal of the app was to make the programme more engaging to its viewers

Rehearsals took place in the month leading up to its premiere. The first edition aired on 13 March 2011. Segments dictated by the viewers included The Sunday #roastreport, Snack Time (where viewers sent in photos of what they were eating) and K-Pop at 6 O'Clock (created after recommendations from a user of the U Live Facebook app who demanded Korean music videos).

The final edition of U Live on 31 August 2013 was also the final programme seen on the channel. The programme (and the channel) ended with the music video to Two Times by Ann Lee, before cutting at 7pm to a slide promoting the timeshift feed of TV2.

== Presenters ==
=== Final Presenters ===
- Connor Nestor (March 13, 2011 - August 31, 2013)
- Matthew Gibb (March 13, 2011 - August 31, 2013)
- Kirsteen Mackenzie (March 20, 2013 - August 31, 2013)
- Eli Matthewson (March 20, 2013 - August 31, 2013)
- Monika Barton (July 31, 2013 - August 31, 2013)

=== Previous Presenters ===
- Tim Lambourne (March 13, 2011 - March 31, 2013)
- Guy Montgomery (Fill In Host, 2011)
- Tom Furniss (Fill In Host, 2012)
- Rose Matafeo (March 13, 2011 - August 2, 2013)

== U Live Facebook App ==
TVNZ teamed up with Facebook to create an application that would allow for user-generated content to be provided and presented on the show, in the form of polls, discussions and music video requests.
