= Astar =

New Zealand broadcaster

- Born: Southland, New Zealand
- Other name: Eileen Kirkpatrick
- Occupation: Television presenter
- Notable credit: Good Morning
- Children: 1 son
- Website: astarsplace.co.nz

Astar is a New Zealand YouTube personality, television presenter and professional florist. She has a YouTube channel Astar's Place, and she previously appeared on the weekday morning series Good Morning as the arts and crafts presenter. She was formerly the yoga instructor on the show.

Astar was born and raised in Southland.

Astar trained in floristry and has worked as an art teacher, floral designer and design tutor before taking a year out to write three yet to be published books. Her focus was on floral design in the many homes owned around the world by the Sultan of Brunei. Astar then decided to return to New Zealand and commenced working on the Good Morning show in 1998.

Astar lives in Auckland with her partner, affectionately called "The Engineer", and her son, affectionately called "The Boy".

== See also ==
- List of New Zealand television personalities
