= Andrea McVeigh =

New Zealand netball player and sports commentator

Andrea McVeigh is a New Zealand sports commentator and former netball player.

McVeigh has been in television broadcasting for over 20 years, primarily as a sports broadcaster. She hosted Blood, Sweat and Tears on TV3 starting in 1996, and Trackchat from 2000. She joined the Sky Sport netball commentary team in 2007, covering the 2007 Netball World Championships and the ANZ Championship from 2008.

McVeigh starting playing netball in North Harbour, where she was named North Harbour Netball's ASB Player of the Year in 1993. She represented Waikato and Canterbury from the ages of 22 to 29. She was signed with Counties Manukau Cometz in the 1998 season of the Coca-Cola Cup, under head coach Ruth Aitken.

== See also ==
- List of New Zealand television personalities
