= Vicki Lin =

New Zealand television presenter and actor

- Born: 1984; Auckland, New Zealand
- Occupation(s): Television presenter Actor
- Known for: host on Saturday Disney host on Studio 2 (New Zealand)

Vicki Lin (born 1984) is a New Zealand television presenter and actor who has appeared on Being Eve and What Now. She joined What Now alongside Tāmati Coffey. Lin co-hosted Studio 2 between 2007 and 2009. She did not return in 2010, as she got a job opportunity with International Community Radio Taipei in Taiwan.

Lin is of Taiwanese descent and was born and raised in Auckland, New Zealand.

== See also ==
- List of New Zealand television personalities
