= Mary Lambie (broadcaster) =

New Zealand media personality and journalist

Mary Lambie is a New Zealand media personality and journalist.

== Career ==
Lambie was presenter of the Good Morning show for seven years from 1997 to 2003. She resigned from Good Morning when production moved from Auckland to Wellington. She then purchased and managed a Subway franchise. She subsequently started her own online reputation management company, Socius. She is married to RNZ broadcaster Jim Mora and lives in Auckland. In 2008 Mora and Lambie related their experience of their daughter's illness from an immune disorder.

== See also ==
- List of New Zealand television personalities
