= Tony Veitch =

New Zealand sports broadcaster

- Born: 1973 (age 52–53)
- Occupation: Sports Broadcaster
- Employer(s): Nine Network, TVNZ, Radio Sport
- Known for: Broadcasting
- Parent(s): Sue and Graham Veitch

Tony Colin Veitch (born 1973) is a New Zealand former reporter and sports broadcaster. He hosted a Radio Sport breakfast show and Television New Zealand's ONE News 6pm sports news. Veitch resigned from all broadcasting roles in the wake of domestic violence revelations in 2008 and a conviction in 2009, but later regained significant roles at Newstalk ZB and Radio Sport, until late 2017.

== Broadcasting ==
Prior to 7 July 2008, Veitch was a highly visible New Zealand sports broadcaster who hosted a Radio Sport breakfast show and the ONE News 6pm sports news until July 2008.

Veitch was born in New Zealand but moved to Australia as a teenager and got his start in broadcasting with Nine Network. He returned to New Zealand at 24 to take up a job as a reporter for TVNZ's Holmes show under Paul Holmes.

On several occasions he performed master of ceremonies in events for the Cure Kids children's charity, and, in 2002, he appeared in a celebrity race in the Queenstown Winter Festival.

In early 2005, Veitch was suspended by TVNZ for about a week after appearing in a horse racing advertisement without asking permission from TVNZ. The same year he appeared in the Auckland City All Stars soccer match for tsunami relief.

Prior to his April 2009 court appearance Veitch made a short comeback, appearing as a guest panelist on Deaker on Sport.

=== Awards ===
In 2002 he won the SPARC Adidas Award for Television Reporting; "the judges said that TVNZ’s Tony Veitch was a great talent in contemporary television reporting with a portfolio that showed the range of his considering reporting ability."

In 2006 he won NZ Radio Awards Best sports presenter: Best Presenter or Talk Show and was a finalist in Best news: Best News Story Team Coverage (with Peter Everatt).

In 2007, he won a New Zealand TV Guide Best on the Box Award for Best Sport Presenter, an accolade given to him again in 2009, after he resigned.

== Domestic violence ==
=== Incident ===
In early 2006 Veitch seriously assaulted his then-partner Kristin Dunne-Powell. The assault broke Dunne-Powell's back in four places and she needed temporarily to use a wheelchair. The injuries kept Dunne-Powell away from work for several months. Her injuries and the emotional trauma she suffered subsequently forced her to quit a managerial position at Vodafone New Zealand. Veitch paid Dunne-Powell NZ$100,000 not to reveal the assault publicly, and to explain the injuries as a result of falling down stairs.

Veitch's lawyers argued for suppression of the police report, however some details were released prior to the court action.

=== Criminal conviction ===
After the publication of the incident, Veitch was charged with six counts of assaulting Dunne-Powell and one of injuring her with reckless disregard, between 2002 and 2006. He was released on bail. On 16 April 2009, he appeared in Auckland District Court and entered a guilty plea to the most serious charge, of injuring with reckless disregard. The Crown did not present evidence regarding the other six charges, and they were dismissed.

Dunne-Powell's victim impact statement read to the Auckland District Court evidenced that Veitch's kicks to her back, whilst she was lying on the ground, caused her spine to fracture in two places, and that Dunne-Powell was forced to use a wheelchair and crutches for several weeks, as a result of Veitch's violent actions towards her.

Veitch was sentenced to nine months of supervision, 300 hours community service and a $10,000 fine with the possibility of having to attend a Stop Violence programme should this be deemed necessary by parole officials.

=== Controversy over character testimonials ===
Since the sentencing, questions have come to light over the accuracy of some of the character testimonials submitted during the sentencing phase of the case. It has been alleged that Veitch amended character references or procured some testimonials from prominent New Zealanders by saying that their testimonials would be used for a passport or job application. These testimonials were used by the judge in setting Veitch's sentence.

In particular, Dame Susan Devoy and Dave Currie have said that testimonials written by them to support a passport application were edited and submitted on this unrelated matter. The Crown will take no action on the matter.

=== Resignation from media work ===
The day after the assault allegations were made public, Veitch turned up to work on Radio Sport, although Andrew Saville presented the sports news on ONE News. TVNZ released a media statement saying "Sports Presenter Tony Veitch has agreed to step down from his role with TVNZ while media allegations are considered by the broadcaster." It reported that "head of news and current affairs Anthony Flannery said that Mr Veitch would step down while a review was conducted into the allegations made against him by some media organisations."

On 9 July, Veitch held a press conference where he said he "broke, I lashed out". He said that although he had no excuses, he had been working seven days a week and was at a low point. He was not on either of his programs that day. The next day, 10 July, TVNZ CEO Rick Ellis released a statement that ONE News' Lisa Owen described as "bland".

It said "Television New Zealand has a review process underway regarding disclosures by sports presenter Tony Veitch. We are giving the situation our most serious consideration, and Tony's personal statement today will be taken into account by the review process," he said. "Violence is a major issue in New Zealand and the profile of our on air presenters is important to the public and to our organisation." Ellis said TVNZ had had a number of conversations with Veitch and his legal representatives, and the review process was being run by the Heads of Television, Human Resources and News and Current Affairs.

Veitch issued a media statement on 17 July 2008 announcing his resignation from both TVNZ and Radio Sport. He was quoted as saying that "TVNZ has been my life, I have loved my job. There have been a lot of statements made that are untrue which make it untenable now for me to continue in my current roles with TVNZ and the Radio Network."

== Return and departure ==
In the New Year of 2011, Veitch returned as the host of the Radio Sport breakfast show and, in 2013, took on other roles with the retiring of Murray Deaker.

In January 2015, Veitch married Lisa Bryan on Puketutu Island. The marriage ended in late 2016.

In October 2015 his comments in relation to the 2015 Rugby World Cup incident where a referee Nigel Owens described a contact as "Not a punch just a push of the fist" attracted widespread criticism. Media and members of the public commented that this was an inappropriate comment for someone convicted of domestic violence to make and representatives of New Zealand Women's Refuge and the National Council of Women responded that his statement on Facebook following the initial criticism showed "a total lack of self-awareness". He has since apologised over the incident.

In May 2016 Veitch's employers NZME published a piece by him in The New Zealand Herald which included an apology for his past domestic violence. Representatives of New Zealand Women's Refuge responded by stating that this statement was an extension of his former victim-blaming. Dunne-Powell's father issued a statement similarly attacking Veitch's statement as "self-serving".

He announced in October 2018 that after a reshuffle of programming at ZB the previous year that he had given up sports broadcasting to open a villa retreat in Bali, which closed down in August 2021.

== See also ==
- List of New Zealand television personalities
