= Chris Parkinson (broadcaster) =

New Zealand broadcaster

- Born: Christopher Robin Parkinson; 30 April 1941; Wairoa, New Zealand
- Died: 27 April 2016 (aged 74); Auckland, New Zealand
- Occupation: Broadcaster
- Years active: 1966–2007
- Known for: Co-founder of Radio Hauraki
- Parent(s): Benjamin Parkinson; Esther Couper

Christopher Robin Parkinson (30 April 1941 – 27 April 2016) was a New Zealand broadcaster. He was one of the co-founders of Radio Hauraki in 1966.

== Early life and family ==
Born in Wairoa on 30 April 1941, Parkinson was the son of Benjamin Edmund Parkinson and Esther Mavis Parkinson (née Couper).

== Broadcasting career ==
In 1966, Parkinson—along with David Gapes, Derek Lowe and Denis O'Callaghan—was a founding director of the pirate radio station Radio Hauraki, which broke the state-controlled broadcasting monopoly in New Zealand. Starting out as a studio technician working for Broadcasting Corporation of New Zealand (BCNZ), Parkinson trained himself to become an on-air announcer, but was told by the corporation at the time that his ability lay in the technical field and they could see no future in his voice. He proved them wrong by becoming one of the most highly sought after voice over announcers of his time. Later using both his technical and announcing talents on Radio Hauraki. Eventually the station was granted a broadcasting licence in 1970.

From 1968 to 1970, Parkinson was an announcer and newsreader in Australia, on Sydney radio and television stations 2GB and TCN-9. Between 1975 and 1976 he was a news presenter on TV2 in Auckland alongside Jennie Goodwin. He was operations manager for Radio Pacific from 1982 to 1988, managing director of Radio Pacific (Waikato) from 1988 to 1989., and a Radio Pacific director between 1986 and 1999. He was the corporate voice for TVNZ news and current affairs (1991–99), Sundance Channel (1999–2003), Solid Gold FM (1999–2005) and Radio Pacific (1982–2007).

Parkinson was awarded the Pater Award for "the golden voice of Australasia" in 1987. He also won nine New Zealand Radio Awards between 1982 and 1999.

== Death ==
Parkinson died in Auckland on 27 April 2016.

== Popular culture ==
The story of Radio Hauraki was told in the 2014 New Zealand television docudrama, Pirate of the Airwaves, in which Parkinson was played by actor Benjamin Murray. Parkinson was also interviewed for the 1996 television documentary, Rock the Boat: the Story of Radio Hauraki 1965–1970.
