= Adrian Hailwood =

New Zealand fashion designer

Adrian Hailwood is a New Zealand fashion designer. He began his design career making screenprinted tshirts, but has become known for his sequinned eveningwear.

== Early life and education ==
Hailwood's interest in fashion began with a love of sneakers as a child, drawing prolific designs from the age of five. Hailwood gained a Bachelor of Design from Victoria University of Wellington before becoming an art director for television advertising. He describes his entry into fashion design as a "mistake", after he designed some t-shirts for a car commercial.

== Fashion design career ==
Hailwood worked for six years for Auckland manufacturer Casual Apparel, learning how to cut, grade, construct and screenprint tshirts. He expanded the range to include denim skirts and screenprinted wool and cashmere pieces produced by Glengyle Knitwear. He opened his first shop in Ponsonby in 2001. The following year he was part of group shows in the Ponsonby Fringe Festival and L’Oreal New Zealand Fashion Week.

Hailwood's first solo show was held at the 2003 New Zealand Fashion Week, and he has appeared at every New Zealand Fashion Week since. He was later mentored by Karen Walker after winning the inaugural Air New Zealand Fashion Export Growth Award in 2004. In 2007 Hailwood won the Development category at the NZ Fashion Export Awards where judges described him as a "rising star in New Zealand with partnerships within the design industry" and someone who was "building the capability to become a great exporter". Hailwood cites his inspirations as pop culture, film, and his trips to Asia. His 2015 "sports luxe" collection featuring intarsia roses and embroidered unicorns was inspired by George V's coat of arms, while his 2016 show used fabrics he designed to celebrate his mother's life.

Hailwood designed the costumes for the 2017 Auckland Theatre Company production of Amadeus, and for the Royal New Zealand Ballet. His designs are held in the Te Papa collection, and the New Zealand Fashion Museum.

Hailwood designs have been worn by Lorde, on the cover of Billboard magazine, Tilda Swinton, Maggie Gyllenhaal, Paloma Faith, Wendy Petrie and Jacinda Ardern.

== Controversy ==
In February 2023 Hailwood was accused of breaching intellectual property, when a Stuff investigation by Dana Johanssen found some of his designs appeared to be more expensive duplicates of those available from "fast fashion" sites such as Urban Revivo, Shein, ASOS and Alibaba. Hailwood had claimed he designed the print for the "tree" dress worn by Jacinda Ardern in the January 2023 Australian Women's Weekly as an homage to Japanese designer Issey Miyake. Stuff alleged that the design is the same as the signature "Mirabelle" dress available in various colours since 2018 from London fashion house Solace London. Hailwood defended himself against the intellectual property charges by saying that some websites may be offering “similar looking but lower quality products”, and that he used the same methods as other designers in the industry. The same Stuff article also raised questions about possible human rights violations during garment production, as Hailwood's brand uses a certification that has been unavailable for more than four years, and Fair Trading Act breaches if consumers were unaware they might be buying mass-produced garments.
