= Bob Leahy (broadcaster) =

New Zealand broadcaster

Bob Leahy is a New Zealand radio and television broadcaster.

He started broadcasting with pirate radio station Radio Hauraki, on its first day of transmission, in 1966, in a pocket of international water, within New Zealand's Hauraki Gulf.

Leahy has voiced many radio shows and news segments over the years, as well as hosting several television shows, in New Zealand.

He currently is employed by Newstalk ZB, a news and talkback station affiliated with the modern Radio Hauraki. His voice can still be heard announcing the news, some 45 years later, on Radio Hauraki.

== See also ==
- List of New Zealand television personalities
