= Toni Marsh =

New Zealand former weather presenter (born 1968)

- Born: 19 November 1968 (age 57); Rotorua, New Zealand
- Occupation: Weather presenter (former)
- Spouse: Paul Gunn (m. 2010)

Toni Marsh (born 19 November 1968, in Rotorua) is a former weather presenter on TV3 in New Zealand. In 2003, she was rated 3rd Sexiest Woman in New Zealand's TV Guide Best of the Box awards, and in 2006 was rated Best Presenter Weather and Sexiest Woman.

Marsh was previously a host on Max TV, then moved on to Channel Z, and then to TV3. She worked part-time from 2003 to 2005 in the mornings reading the news for The Edge's Morning Madhouse.

Marsh has also helped out with the JingleBail Fund, a children's Christmas charity run by The Edge, where in 2003 she auctioned a dinner date with herself on TradeMe, followed in 2004 by an auction where she agreed to record her voice on the winner's answering machine.

She married Paul Gunn on 9 October 2010 and resigned from TV3 at the end of the year to have a baby.

== See also ==
- List of New Zealand television personalities
