= Lindsay Yeo =

New Zealand broadcaster (1946–2024)

- Born: Lindsay Gilbert Yeo; 1946; Southland, New Zealand
- Died: 12 November 2024 (aged 78); Richmond, Tasman, New Zealand
- Occupation: Radio personality
- Years active: 1964–1998
- Known for: Host of 2ZB breakfast show (1972–1995); creation of "Buzz O'Bumble"
- Spouse: Janice Marian Franklin (m. 1969)
- Children: 4
- Awards: Local air personality of the year (metropolitan) (1982)

Lindsay Gilbert Yeo (1946 – 12 November 2024) was a New Zealand radio broadcaster. He was best known for hosting the 2ZB breakfast show in Wellington between 1972 and 1995, and for his creation of the children's character "Buzz O'Bumble".

== Biography ==
The second son of Arthur Leonard Yeo and Mary Yeo (née Coveney), Yeo was born in 1946 in Southland where he grew up. As a teenager he played in a band called the Teen Beat Five. His career in radio began in 1964 when he was a copywriter with the 4ZA radio station in Invercargill. He was trained by broadcaster and educator Haydn Sherley. Yeo went on to host the breakfast show on 2ZN, the New Zealand Broadcasting Corporation's (NZBC) commercial radio station in Nelson, until moving to NZBC head office in Wellington in 1971.

Yeo presented the breakfast show on 2ZB in Wellington for 23 years from 1972 to 1995. It was consistently the number one rated Wellington breakfast radio programme until the late 1980s. In 1973, Yeo created the children's character "Buzz O'Bumble". "Buzz" appeared every day on the radio show, with his other friends "Belinda" the bee and "Wally Weta". In the summer of 1974 "Buzz" married "Belinda" on the steps of Broadcasting House with programme producer Gerard Duignan dressed as Buzz and Jan McGregor, receptionist, as Belinda Bee. Little has been heard of these characters since the format of 2ZB changed to news/talk in the late 1990s, and his community-oriented breakfast show was replaced with news and interviews. Wellington Museum has Buzz O'Bumble's mask and jacket on display.

In April 1997, Yeo moved from Newstalk ZB to Classic Hits 90FM where he hosted a new show. There was considerable local support for Yeo and opposition to his removal from Newstalk ZB to be replaced by Paul Holmes whose breakfast show was networked from Auckland. Later that year, the rating for Holmes's show had dropped while Yeo's ratings for his morning show on Classic Hits had risen. Support for Yeo and local radio shows rather than content produced in Auckland continued with Wellington mayors meeting Newstalk ZB managers. In May 1998, Yeo lost his job as breakfast show host on Classic Hits. The reason given was that Classic Hits was looking to appeal to a younger audience while Yeo was popular with an older demographic.

In 1992, radio reviewer Jane Hurley acknowledged the appeal of Yeo's 2ZB breakfast show as follows:

"The show really rides on Yeo's personality and he's certainly got plenty of that. He's not so much cheerful as permanently stuck in life-and-soul-of-the-party mode. Yeo hardly ever just speaks; he cajoles, he burbles, he sings out, he hams up nearly every word. The whole show's like one long version of the old panto routine, the one that goes "Oh no I didn't/Oh yes you did!"...... it was kinda fun – a loud but genuinely Kiwi version of breakfast bounce, right down to the overgrown buzzy bee mascot. Yeo, bro, I reckon you might just deserve your swarms of fans."

Yeo won the metropolitan station section of Local Air Personality of the Year in the Mobil Radio Awards in 1982. Later in 1982 he was the first host of Television New Zealand's dance show Top Dance '82. In early 1984, he returned to Invercargill to do a special broadcast on 4ZA after the city and Southland towns were affected by flooding.

In 1985, Yeo was one of eight celebrity guest conductors at a Wellington Regional Orchestra VIP concert. Yeo conducted Flight of the Bumblebee.

Yeo reminisced in the book Broadcasting House, 1963–1997: if these walls could talk how the broadcasting studio was close to parliament allowing easy access to politicians. He recalled a conversation with the Prime Minister Bill Rowling about going to the dentist. He also thought that the emergence of the private radio station Radio Hauraki prompted the NZBC to listen to its listeners.

Yeo retired to the Tasman District in 2001. In 2016, he launched a hobby radio station, Radiyo Richmond, broadcasting on a low power frequency to the local area from his home studio, and playing "non-stop pleasant music from all genres" aimed at listeners in his own age group.

=== Personal life and death ===
Yeo became engaged to Janice Marian Franklin in October 1968, and they married the following year. Jan and Lindsay Yeo ran various businesses, including a fancy dress costume shop in Karori and rest homes. The couple had three sons and one daughter. Yeo's nephew, also named Lindsay Yeo, is a psychologist and singer.

Yeo died at his home in Richmond, Tasman on 12 November 2024, at the age of 78.
