= Dayna Vawdrey =

New Zealand television presenter

- Born: 17 January 1982 (age 44); Auckland, New Zealand
- Occupation: Television presenter
- Known for: Juice TV; Studio 2
- Spouse: Callum Galloway

Dayna Vawdrey (born 17 January 1982), is a New Zealand television presenter and radio announcer perhaps best known for her role co-hosting Studio 2.

== Early life ==
Vawdrey was born in Auckland of British (mother) and Samoan (father) descent. As a child she landed a role in a TV commercial.

== Career ==
Vawdrey's career really began when she secured a presenting role on Juice TV in 2003. In 2004 she was poached by TVNZ to co-host TV2's children's TV show, Studio 2. When the series ended in 2010, Vawdrey worked as a radio announcer for Rhema Media. In 2011 Vawdrey presented Operation Hero on TV2. Vawdrey has also MC'd and presented for various corporate and charity clients such as Air New Zealand and World Vision.

In 2018 Vawdrey won Best Children's Programme at the New Zealand Radio Awards and was a Bronze Radio Winner for Best Children/Young Adult Program at the New York Festivals World's Best Radio Programs for her role as a presenter on a Christmas morning children's programme on Newstalk ZB.

== Personal life ==
Dayna married Callum Galloway in 2014 and the couple have one son, born in 2017, and a daughter, born November 2020.

== See also ==
- List of New Zealand television personalities
