= Michelle Buchanan =

New Zealand numerologist (born 1969)

Michelle Buchanan (born Michelle Tracey Wilson, 28 March 1969) is a Western Pythagorean Numerologist. She is best known for her television and radio appearances. In 2009, she became the Numerologist and Spiritual Counselor for New Zealand's Woman’s Day magazine. She has been the resident Numerologist for Television New Zealand's Good Morning since 2010. In 2012, Buchanan began her numerology show Discover Your Destiny on the self-help radio station, Hay House Radio.

In Jan 2013, Buchanan signed an international publishing contract with Hay House Publishing for her first numerology book The Numerology Guidebook – Uncover Your Destiny and the Blueprint of Your Life and a deck of numerology oracle cards - Numerology Guidance Cards. Both were released in December, 2013. A Numerology Guidance Cards APP for IOS and Android devices was also released in 2014. Her second book, Hay House Basics - Numerology was released in November, 2015, accompanied by an online course, An Introduction To Numerology, through Hay House Publishing UK.

In 2018, Hay House Basics - Numerology was republished as Numerology Made Easy - Discover Your Future, Life Purpose and Destiny From Your Birth Date and Name and her online course renamed Numerology Made Easy.

Buchanan is also a contributing columnist for lifestyle media brand, "MindBodyGreen" (www.mindbodygreen.com), a singer/songwriter and mother of two who resides in Auckland, New Zealand.
