= Frank Ritchie =

New Zealand broadcaster

Rev Frank (Francis) Ritchie
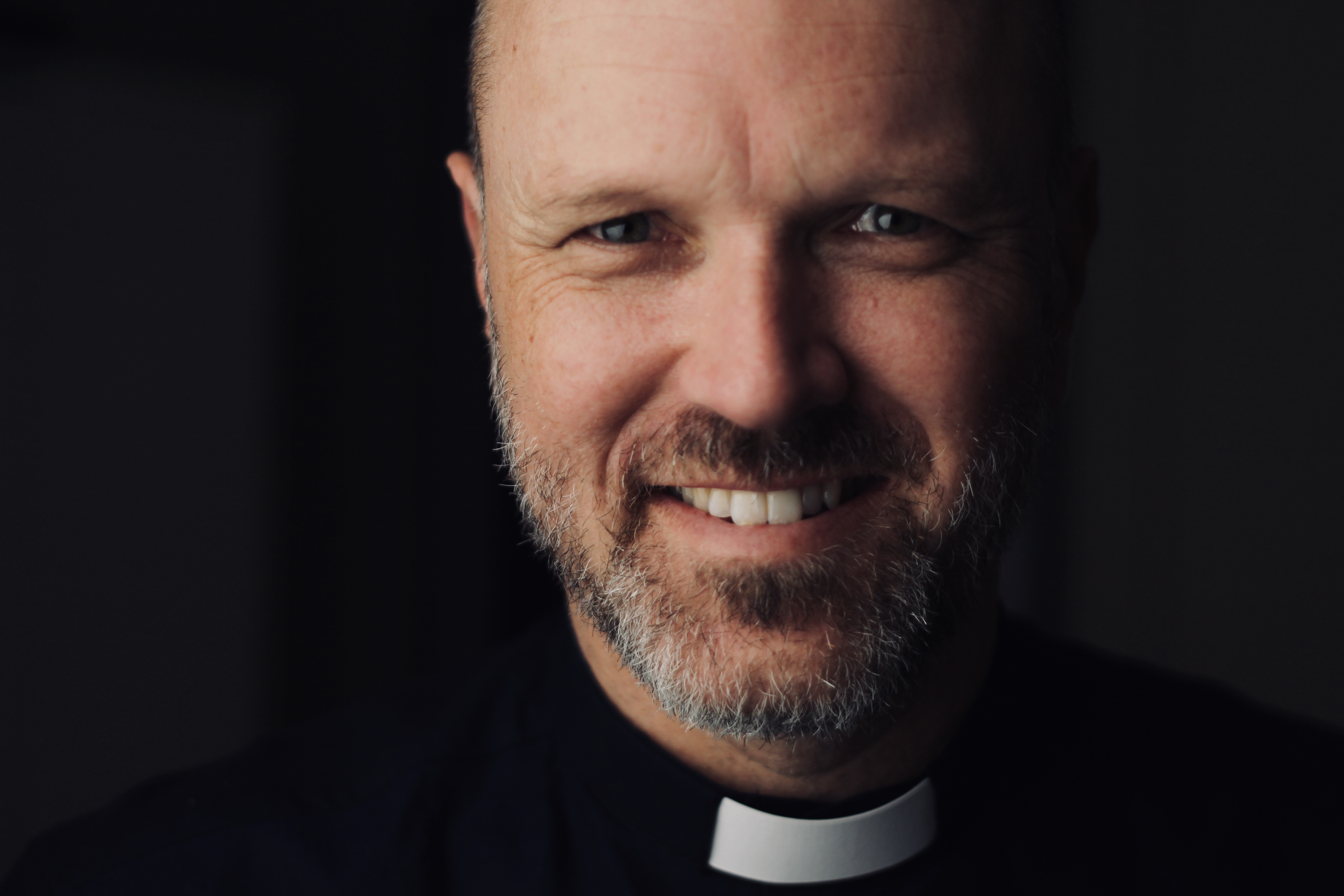
- Reverend Frank Ritchie is a New Zealand broadcaster, chaplain and minister.
- Other name: Frank
- Occupations: Broadcaster, Minister
- Presenting career
- Show: Sunday at Six with Frank & Jax
- Network: Newstalk ZB
- Time slot: 6pm-7:30pm Sundays

Francis Anderson Ritchie, known as Frank Ritchie, is a New Zealand radio broadcaster, Media Chaplain, and ordained Christian Minister who is a Sunday evening radio host on Newstalk ZB.

== Early life ==
Raised in Te Aroha, Ritchie was the son of an alcoholic absent father and a mother on the DPB.

== Broadcasting career ==
After beginning his working career as a painter & decorator, Ritchie's first introduction to broadcasting was on Christian radio network Life FM as a regular panelist. In his early 20s Ritchie began hosting Life FM's nationwide talkback programme The Green Room, which he did for 8 years. Ritchie also hosted other programmes on Life FM including the night show and then drive show.

In 2010 Ritchie began hosting occasional Easter and Christmas programmes on Newstalk ZB produced by CBA.

Ritchie replaced Sam Bloore in 2018 alongside co-host Jax van Buuren from 6pm-7:30pm Sunday nights.
