= Marama Martin =

New Zealand television presenter (1930–2017)

- Born: Marama Isabel Koea; 3 April 1930; New Plymouth, New Zealand
- Died: 10 July 2017 (aged 87); Nelson, New Zealand
- Known for: Television and radio personality
- Spouse: Bertram Whitaker Martin (m. 1968)

Marama Isabel Martin (née Koea; 3 April 1930 – 10 July 2017) was a New Zealand television and radio broadcaster. She was the first person seen on colour television in New Zealand, and was the last person to appear on NZBC TV.

== Early life and family ==
Born in New Plymouth on 3 April 1930 of Māori descent, Martin affiliated to Te Āti Awa. She was the daughter of Teoti (George) Te Koea and Isabel Porahau Koea (née Falwasser). She studied at Ardmore Teachers' Training College, and then worked for a time as a teacher at a number of schools in the North Island. She travelled to the United Kingdom for her overseas experience in 1953, and had a role as an extra in the 1954 film The Seekers, which was set in New Zealand.

== Broadcasting ==
Returning to New Zealand, Koea resumed her teaching career in New Plymouth, before becoming a radio announcer there. In the early 1960s, she moved to Wellington, and in 1965 started continuity announcing on television. She was the second Māori television continuity announcer, following Tui Uru. From 1967, she appeared on the BBC radio programme Family Favourites, providing contributions from New Zealand.

In 1968, she married Bert Martin in Wellington.

When colour television began broadcasting in New Zealand in October 1973, Marama Martin was the first person seen on screen, wearing a mauve dress. On 31 March 1975, Martin was the last person to appear on NZBC TV, before New Zealand's sole television channel at the time was split into TV One and TV2. She continued as a radio broadcaster on the YC stations until 1978.

== Later life and death ==
Following her retirement from broadcasting, Martin resumed her teaching career at The Correspondence School. In 1984 she became a director of Coast FM, the first commercial FM radio station in New Zealand. Marama and Bert Martin retired to the Gold Coast in Australia in 1987, but later returned to Nelson, where she lived until her death there on 10 July 2017, aged 87.

== See also ==
- List of New Zealand television personalities
