= Mark Hewlett =

New Zealand broadcaster

Mark Hewlett (born 26 December 1974) is a New Zealand radio and television personality. In 2003 Hewlett was crowned Fear Factor grand champion.

As a child, his parents fled Rhodesia to settle in Canada and the United States during the Rhodesian Bush War. The family then moved back to their native Zimbabwe in 1980 and then to neighbouring South Africa in 1987. He was schooled at Michaelhouse in the KwaZulu-Natal Midlands, where he matriculated from in 1992. In 1996, after a year at Natal University and a stay in London, Hewlett, for the fifth time, emigrated overseas this time to Los Angeles for a change of pace. There he was discovered by a photographer and began his modelling career. Following his move Hewlett was diagnosed with Type 1 diabetes: he now injects himself four times a day.

During his stay in Los Angeles Hewlett successfully competed in the Fear Factor Grand Champion edition which he won and took home $100,000 a portion of which he gave to his New Zealand-based parents. Hot on the heels of his Fear Factor win, Hewlett moved to New Zealand so he could be closer to his parents, he appeared in numerous television shows and was a daily host on radio station ZM.

== See also ==
- List of New Zealand television personalities
