= 3ZB =

Christchurch; New Zealand
- Frequencies: 1098AM - 3ZB; 97.7FM - B98FM

Programming
- Language: English
- Format: Adult contemporary

Ownership
- Owner: Radio New Zealand until 1996; The Radio Network after 1996

History
- First air date: 1937; 89 years ago

Technical information
- Transmitter coordinates: 43.5259227°S 172.6073114°E

3ZB was a radio station based in Christchurch, New Zealand. This station was run by Radio New Zealand (formally the NZBS/NZBC/BCNZ) and eventually spawned a second FM station called B98FM. Today 3ZB and B98FM are part of a nationwide networks Newstalk ZB and The Hits

== History ==
=== Early years ===
The station was started by Radio New Zealand (which at the time was known as the National Broadcasting Service) in 1937 originally broadcasting on 1110AM. The station was branded from the stations callsign 3ZB. ZB stations were assigned to the four main regions in New Zealand, Auckland, Wellington, Christchurch and Dunedin. While content was local some network shows were heard such as Aunt Daisy up until 1963. In 1978 the station moved to 1098AM after New Zealand changed from 10 kHz spacing on the AM band to 9 kHz spacing.

=== Switch to FM ===
3ZB began broadcasting on 96.1FM in 1990 in additional to the 1098AM frequency. For a short period in 1990 the station also broadcast on 93.7FM. In July 1991 broadcasting on 96.1FM was discontinued and at the same time a decision was made to launch a new station on 97.7FM.

=== Launch of B98FM ===
A secondary station was launched in July 1991 called B98FM, broadcasting on 97.7FM. The new station shared some programming with 3ZB such as both 3ZB and B98FM had the same breakfast show presented by John Dunne and Ken Ellis. B98FM was a music station originally playing an adult contemporary music format. In 1993 B98FM changed format to an oldies with the brand name Good Time Oldies B98FM, a similar station called Good Time Oldies B90FM was also launched in Wellington which was run in tandem with 2ZB similar to 3ZB and B98FM.

=== 3ZB becomes Newstalk ZB ===
Following the launch of B98FM in 1991 the 3ZB 1098AM station made a move towards a talkback format. Auckland station 1ZB and Wellington 2ZB had also moved to a talkback format and 4ZB Dunedin continued to run an FM music station called ZBFM and a talk station on the original AM frequency. By 1993 Radio New Zealand had moved most of their local AM radio stations around the country to an FM frequency in addition to the original AM frequency. At this point a decision was made to network Auckland's Newstalk 1ZB station across the country utilising the AM frequencies once used by the local stations. In 1993 3ZB became Newstalk ZB, the station continued to run local talkback programming throughout the day.

=== B98FM becomes Classics Hits B98 ===
In 1993 Radio New Zealand consolidated their local FM stations into a single brand called Classic Hits taking on similar branding to Classic Hits 97FM in Auckland. As part of the rebrand most stations adopted the heritage name into the station, for Goodtime Oldies B98FM the station became known as Classic Hits B98. A similar move was made in Wellington with Goodtime Oldies B90FM in Wellington becoming Classic Hits B90. Unlike other stations rebranded as Classic Hits, the Christchurch and Wellington stations played music from mostly the 1960s and 1970s, originally Classic Hits stations in other markets played music from the 1960s to the 1990s.

=== Change of ownership ===
In July 1996 the New Zealand Government sold off the commercial arm of Radio New Zealand, which included, among other things, the Classic Hits and Newstalk ZB branded stations. The new owner was The Radio Network, a subsidiary of APN News & Media and Clear Channel Communications, which operated as a division of the Australian Radio Network.

Around 1996 Classic Hits B98 became Classic Hits 98FM with the station moving towards the same format as the other Classic Hits stations. Unlike other Classic Hits station, local programming was not reduced to just a local breakfast show in 1998 and the station remained live and local 24 hours a day up to 2002. The Classic Hits Christchurch station also ran its own playlist with a Classic rock slant in the early 2000s, the station also ran its own local competitions. Local content was reduced from 2003 onwards and by 2006 the only local show was the breakfast show, as with all other Classic Hits stations at the time.

=== Stations today ===
==== Newstalk ZB Christchurch ====
The original 1098AM frequency used for 3ZB is still used to broadcast Newstalk ZB Christchurch. Since 2011 Newstalk ZB Christchurch can also be heard on 100.1FM. Local content on the station has been reduced over the years, by 2008 local content had been reduced to a local breakfast show presented by John Dunne & Ken Ellis and a morning show presented by Ali Jones. The local breakfast show was dropped following Ellis's departure from the station. The local morning show was also dropped at the end of 2009 with the station losing all local programming except news for a short period in 2010. The local morning show was reinstated in July 2010 due to listeners complaints and a drop in audience.

==== The Hits 97.7 Christchurch ====
The Classic Hits brand that B98FM became part of in 1993 was rebranded as The Hits in 2014. Between 2012 and 2013 the Christchurch studios were used to broadcast a nationwide drive show on the Classic Hits network, presented by Jason Gunn and Dave Fitzgerald, in addition to the local breakfast show presented by AJ Funnell, Chloe Emirali and Andy Ellis. On 28 April 2014, all stations part of the Classic Hits network were rebranded as The Hits. A networked breakfast presented by Polly Gillespie and Grant Kareama was introduced to almost all The Hits stations with the former breakfast announcer moved to present a 6-hour show between 9am and 3pm. At this point local breakfast presenter AJ Funnell began presenting a local show between 9am and 12pm followed by a network show presented by Dave Fitzgerald from the Christchurch studio with separate voice breaks for Christchurch listeners. With Polly and Grant leaving The Hits in 2017 all South Island stations reverted to local breakfast programming. Today Brodie Kane and Dave Fitzgerald present the breakfast show from 6am, followed by network programming from 9am.

== Studio location ==
The original 3ZB studios were located in Colombo Street near Armagh Street. Other local stations were housed at 205 Gloucester Street, that building used for other stations such as National Radio and 91ZM. Following the arrival of television in New Zealand the National Broadcasting Service converted their existing radio studio buildings for television, the building was used as studios for CHTV3 which eventually became TV ONE. In the 1980s TVNZ and Radio New Zealand used a building on Worcester Street located behind the Gloucester Street building to produce many of their TV and radio shows. From the 1990s onwards The Radio Network Christchurch stations were housed in the Worcester Street building. Following the devastating earthquake on 22 February 2011, the studio moved temporarily to Riccarton Road, Christchurch. Both stations are now located on a new purpose-built facility on Midas Place, Middleton, Christchurch.
