= Petra Bagust =

New Zealand television presenter

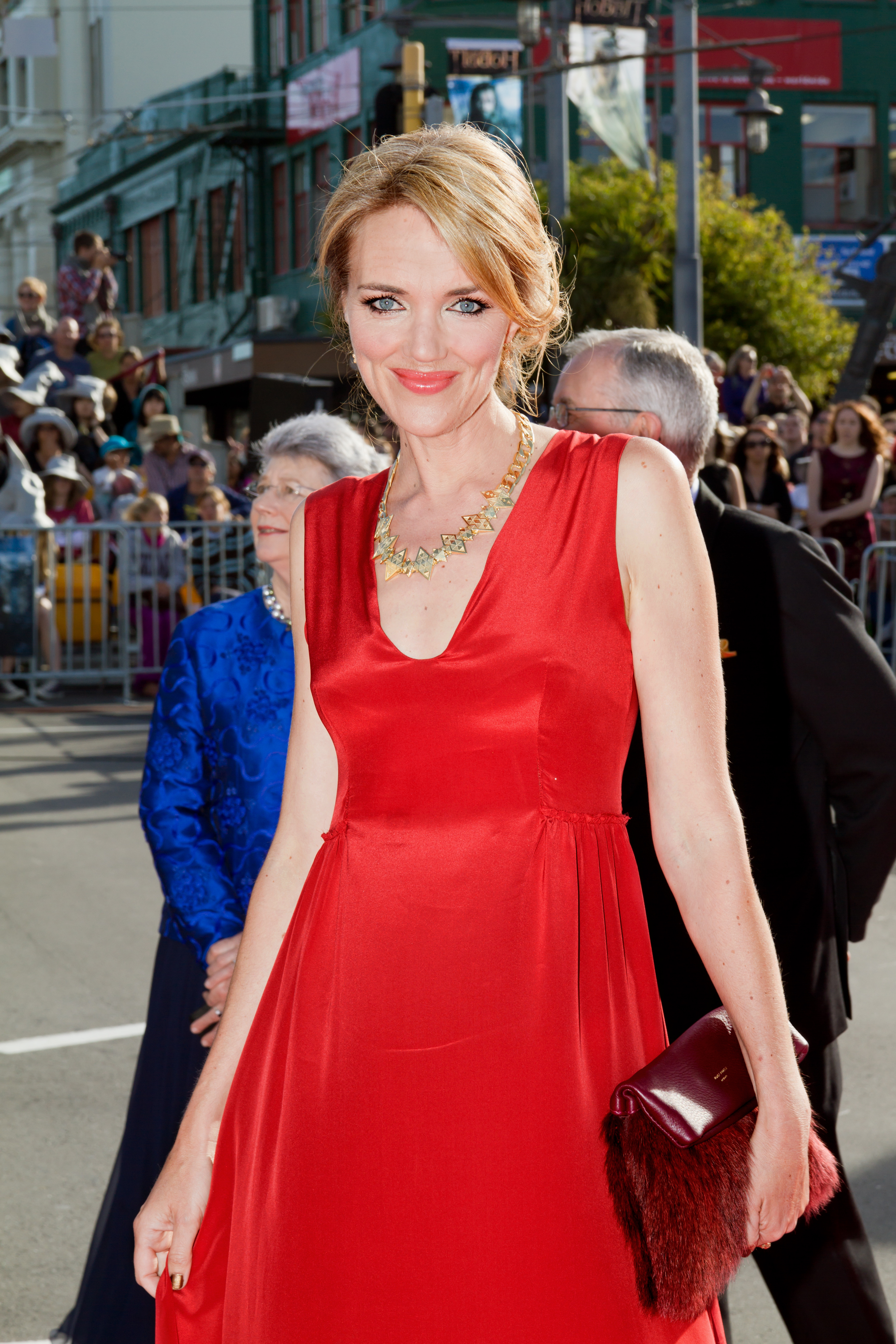
- Bagust at the world premiere of The Hobbit - An Unexpected Journey, November 2012 Wellington, New Zealand.
- Born: 14 April 1972 (age 54); Christchurch, New Zealand
- Occupation: Television presenter Radio Host Podcaster Chaplain
- Years active: 1996-present
- Spouse: Hamish Wilson (2000-present) 3 children

Petra Bagust is a New Zealand television presenter, radio host, podcaster and media chaplain, perhaps best known for her role as co-presenter of TVNZ's morning show Breakfast.

== Career ==
Bagust grew up in Christchurch and attended University of Canterbury, where she completed a Bachelor of Fine Arts in 1995. She began her television career at local TV station Cry TV. She later co-hosted youth TV series Ice TV, its sequel Ice As, and later a wide range of programming include travel shows, real estate shows, and game shows. She was also a regular host of the annual event Coca-Cola Christmas in the Park and St Paul's GLOW Carols by Glowstick.

In 2008, 2009 and 2010 she hosted New Zealand programme What's Really In Our Food?, broadcast on TV3. At the same time, she hosted a weekly radio programme with Pat Brittenden on Newstalk ZB.

She changed networks in 2011 to present TVNZ's Breakfast alongside Corin Dann. In October 2012 she announced her departure from the show and was replaced the following year by Toni Street.

In March 2022, Bagust launched a Rova podcast called Grey Areas, featuring her speaking with guests including Jackie Brown, Wendyl Nissan, Karen Walker, Robert Rakete, Miriama Kamo and Robyn Malcolm, about growing older in New Zealand. It soon became the top podcast in New Zealand and stayed in the top ten Apple Podcasts for eight weeks. In season seven of Grey Areas, Bagust revealed she had been diagnosed with ADHD.

In February 2023, Bagust launched a weekly two hour radio show that she hosts on Today FM called Sunday Sanctuary.

Bagust is also a media chaplain with the Christian Broadcasting Association.

== Awards ==
Bagust was nominated for her work on What's Really In Our Food? in the Qantas Film and Television Awards three years running, 2008, 2009 and 2010.

Her Grey Areas podcast won Best Entertainment Podcast – Seasonal at the 2023 New Zealand Radio Awards, and Best Entertainment Podcast at the 2023 New Zealand Podcast Awards.

Grey Areas with Petra Bagust won Best Independent Podcast at the 2026 NZ Radio & Podcast Awards.

== Personal life ==
Bagust married freelance cameraman Hamish Wilson in 2000; the couple have three children. Bagust's departure from morning television was explained as wanting to spend more time with her family.

She is a Christian.

== See also ==
- List of New Zealand television personalities
