= 2ZB =

Former radio station based in Wellington, New Zealand

Wellington; New Zealand
- Frequencies: 1035AM - 2ZB; 90.0FM - B90FM; 89.4FM - B90FM (Kapiti)

Programming
- Language: English language
- Format: Adult contemporary

Ownership
- Owner: Radio New Zealand until 1996; The Radio Network after 1996

Technical information
- Transmitter coordinates: 41°17′20″S 174°46′38″E

2ZB was a radio station based in Wellington, New Zealand. This station was run by Radio New Zealand (formally the NZBS/NZBC/BCNZ) and eventually spawned a second FM station called B90FM. Today 2ZB and B90FM are part of a nationwide networks Newstalk ZB and The Hits respectively.

== History ==
=== Early years ===
The station was started by Radio New Zealand (which at the time was known as the National Broadcasting Service) in 1937, originally broadcasting on 980AM. The station was branded from the station's callsign 2ZB. ZB stations were assigned to the four main regions in New Zealand, Auckland, Wellington, Christchurch and Dunedin. While content was mostly local, some network shows were heard, such as Aunt Daisy up until 1963. In 1978 the station moved to 1035AM after New Zealand changed from 10 kHz spacing on the AM band to 9 kHz spacing.

=== Switch to FM ===
In early 1991 2ZB began broadcasting on 89.8FM and also extended programming to the Kapiti region broadcasting on 89.4FM. The station continued to broadcast on 1035AM.

=== Launch of B90FM and 2ZB becomes Newstalk ZB ===
By 1993 Radio New Zealand had moved most of their local AM radio stations around the country to an FM frequency and in most cases each station continued to broadcast on the original AM frequency. At this point a decision was made to network Auckland's Newstalk 1ZB station across the country utilising the AM frequencies once used by the local station. In 1993 the 2ZB 1035AM frequency became Newstalk ZB, the Wellington station continued to run local programming throughout the day and some of the 2ZB announcers remained with Newstalk ZB Wellington into the late 2000s. At the same time 2ZB on 89.8FM was relaunched as Goodtime Oldies B90FM, this station was similar to Christchurch radio station Goodtime Oldies B98FM.

=== Goodtime Oldies B90FM becomes Classics Hits B90FM ===
In 1993 Radio New Zealand consolidated their local FM stations into a single brand called Classic Hits taking on similar branding to Classic Hits 97FM in Auckland. As part of the rebrand most stations adopted the heritage name into the station, for Goodtime Oldies B90FM the station became known as Classic Hits B90FM. A similar move was made in Christchurch with Goodtime Oldies B98FM becoming Classic Hits B98. Unlike other stations rebranded as Classic Hits, the Christchurch and Wellington stations played music from mostly the 1960s and 1970s, originally Classic Hits stations in other markets played music from the 1960s to the 1990s.

In 1995 Classic Hits B90FM became Classic Hits 90FM with the station moving towards the same format as the other Classic Hits stations. At the same time the Wellington station moved to 90.0FM broadcasting from four separate transmitters located at Tinakori Hill (Wellington), Towai (Lower Hutt), Haywards (Upper Hutt) and Colonial Knob (Porirua).

=== Change of ownership and reduction in local programming ===
In July 1996 the New Zealand Government sold off the commercial arm of Radio New Zealand, which included, among other things, the Classic Hits and Newstalk ZB branded stations. The new owner was The Radio Network, a subsidiary of APN News & Media and Clear Channel Communications, which operated as a division of the Australian Radio Network.

In 1998 Classic Hits 90FM was reduced to just 4 hours of local programming between 6 and 10 am 7 days a week. Outside this time nationwide shows based from Auckland took over, and the network announcers simply called the station Classic Hits. Local programming has also been gradually reduced on Newstalk ZB Wellington since the late nineties.

=== Kapiti station ===
In 2001 the 89.4FM frequency in Kapiti was replaced with the Newstalk ZB network program. In 2004 a new Classic Hits station was launched in Kapiti on 92.7FM as Classic Hits 92.7, this frequency was previously used for Radio Sport. The new station studios were located on Kapiti road in Paraparaumu and originally had its own local breakfast show with the station running Classic Hits network programming after 10am. Both Newstalk ZB and Classic Hits in Kapiti had their own local advertisements for the Kapiti area. In 2009 the local breakfast on Classic Hits 92.7 was discontinued and the Classic Hits 90FM Wellington breakfast show became the breakfast show on this station.

=== Stations today ===
==== Newstalk ZB Wellington ====
The original 1035AM frequency used for 2ZB is still used to broadcast Newstalk ZB Wellington. Over the years local content has been reduced on Wellington's Newstalk ZB. Lindsay Yeo presented the breakfast show on 2ZB from 1987 up to 1996, after his departure the then network based Paul Holmes breakfast took this shows place. Paul Holmes actually worked on 2ZB during the 1980s before moving to 1ZB in Auckland. Justin Du Fresne broadcast the morning show up until 2010, today the Wellington morning show is presented by Sean Plunket. On Saturday mornings Garry Ward presented a morning show called 'The Great Weekender' from 1983 up until his death in 2009. The show was taken over by Justin Du Fresne in 2009 but discontinued in 2013.

==== The Hits 90.1FM Wellington ====
The FM station was moved to 90.1FM in 2010. On 28 April 2014 all stations part of the Classic Hits network were rebranded as The Hits. Coinciding with the rebrand ZM breakfast announcers Pauline Gillespie and Grant Kareama were moved over to The Hits. Polly and Grant have been part of the Wellington radio market since the 1980s presenting the breakfast show on ZMFM Wellington and later to a nationwide audience from the ZM Wellington studios. Local programming was increased in Wellington coinciding with the rebrand to The Hits with the station running 9 hours a day of Wellington-based programming. Polly and Grant left The Hits in 2017 and today the stations runs a local show between 9am and 3pm presented by Jay Harvie.

==== The Hits 89.4FM Kapiti ====
The Kapiti 89.4 station was also rebranded as The Hits. The Kapiti station contains the same local shows as the Wellington station but contains its own local advertising.
