= New Zealand robin =

New Zealand robin has been split into the following species:

- North Island robin, Petroica longipes
- South Island robin, Petroica australis
