= Studio 2 LIVE =

New Zealand television program

- Also known as: Studio 2
- Created by: Taylormade Media
- Presented by: Matt Gibb, Dayna Vawdrey, Jordan Vandermade
- Opening theme: Mukpuddy Animation
- Country of origin: New Zealand

Production
- Running time: 60 minutes (including promo breaks)

Original release
- Network: TV2
- Release: 22 March 2004 – 1 October 2010

Related
- WNTV

Studio 2 LIVE is a New Zealand children's television show. It was originally named Studio 2 up until 2010, when it was renamed Studio 2 LIVE. It premiered on 22 March 2004 after WNTV (What Now's afternoon show) was cancelled. It screened weekdays from 3:30–4:30 p.m. on TV2. The series ended on 1 October 2010.

Studio 2 LIVE had an interactive website called "The Hub" where the presenters chatted with fans even after the series ended on 1 October 2010. However, the website closed down in August 2011.

Studio 2 was directed by Ganesh Raj and executive produced by Ian Taylor. The show's intended audience is children from ages five to 12. Studio 2 organised a contest called "My School is Cool" in 2004. Out of over 150 schools that competed, the show selected six as winners. The show had a game called I-Spy involving a secret agent named BBQ. Over the course of two weeks, the game gives a daily hint about how to get to the bottom of a mystery.

== Presenters ==
- Matt Gibb (22 March 2004 - 1 October 2010)
- Dayna Vawdrey (22 March 2004 - 1 October 2010)
- Jordan Vandermade (2006 - 1 October 2010)
- Vicki Lin (2007–2009)

== History ==
=== Guests ===
Over the years of Studio 2 Live, a number of celebrities and public figures have been guests on the show such as Rodger Bumpass and former New Zealand Prime Minister Helen Clark. She was a guest on the show in 2004.

=== 2004 ===
When Studio 2 premiered in March 2004 there were only 2 presenters, Matthew Gibb and Dayna Vawdrey.

=== 2005 ===
In 2005, NZ Idol contestant Sela Mahe joined the show as a roving reporter.

=== 2006 ===
Jordan Vandermade was introduced as a new co-host at the start of 2006.

=== 2007 ===
Studio 2 had a Saturday show called Studio 2 Saturday which premiered in April 2007. It was hosted by Jordan Vandermade and Vicki Lin and had 3 web-ops appear on the show and interactively with The Hub

- In 2007 another new face appeared "Vicki Lin" and it also became a 6-day a week program
- In April 2007 Studio 2 Saturday released "The-Hub"
- On 22 December 2007 was the last Studio 2 Saturday show.

=== 2008 ===
Studio 2 returned to its regular broadcasting schedule of 5 days a week.

=== 2009 ===
Studio 2 starts at a new time of 3:30PM and also includes a cartoon, SpongeBob SquarePants airing randomly between 3:30PM – 4:30PM

=== 2010 ===
Vicki Lin does not join the Studio 2 LIVE team this year.

- Studio 2 LIVE returned to TV2, 19 April.
- It is revealed, that after seven years on air, this will be the final year of Studio 2. The final episode aired on 1 October 2010.

== Studio 2 Saturday ==
Studio 2 LIVE
- Also known as: Studio 2 Saturday
- Created by: Taylormade Media
- Starring: Jordan Vandermade, Vicki Lin
- Country of origin: New Zealand

Production
- Running time: 60 minutes (including promo breaks)
- Production company: Studio 2 2007

Original release
- Network: TV2
- Release: April 2007 – December 2007

Studio 2 Saturday premiered in 2007 after the New Zealand version of Saturday Disney was cancelled. It worked interactively with its website "The Hub".

=== Presenters ===
- Jordan Vandermade
- Vicki Lin

From time to time you would see an appearance by Matthew Gibb or Dayna Vawdrey on the show. At the time they were the hosts of the Weekday Version of Studio 2 Saturday. After Studio 2 Saturday finished, Vicki Lin and Jordan Vandermade now host the Weekday Version of Studio 2 Saturday.

=== the-hub.tv ===
the-hub.tv was a big part of Studio 2 Saturday. Presenters, Guests and Web-Ops would often chat on the website and often read out 'posts' by home viewers and sometimes even give out prizes. The site also worked alongside The Weekday Show, and was used much more frequently after the Saturday show was canceled. The website was still running even after Studio 2 LIVE finished, but was closed down in August 2012, nearly two years after the show had ended.
