= Percy Ronald Stevens =

New Zealand mechanic and radio broadcaster

Percy Ronald Stevens (1893–1963) was a notable New Zealand mechanic and radio broadcaster. He was born in Napier, Hawke's Bay, New Zealand in 1893.
