= Haydn Sherley =

New Zealand radio personality (1924–2007)

Haydn Sherley QSM
- Haydn Sherley at 1XH
- Born: Haydn Ferrars Sherley; 29 March 1924; Hamilton, New Zealand
- Died: 14 June 2007 (aged 83); Paraparaumu, New Zealand

Haydn Ferrars Sherley QSM (29 March 1924 – 14 June 2007) was a New Zealand radio personality. Affectionately known as 'the grandfather of radio' Sherley was a household name for decades in New Zealand, due to his work on national and commercial radio, in a career that spanned over fifty years.

== Early life and family ==
Born in the Hamilton suburb of Frankton Junction on 29 March 1924, Sherley was the son of Clyde Ferrars Sherley, a dental surgeon, and his wife, Isabel Mary Rogers. He was educated at Auckland Grammar School from 1937 to 1941.

During World War II, Sherley served in the Royal New Zealand Air Force between 1943 and 1945. He undertook training at the Royal Canadian Air Force's No. 6 Bombing and Gunnery School, Mountain View, and No. 2 Air Navigation School, Pennfield Ridge. He received the New Zealand War Service Medal and the War Medal 1939–1945.

In 1950, Sherley married Joan Millicent Lamburd, and the couple went on to have five children.

== Career ==
Sherley came into radio almost by chance. "Radio was 'glamorous' and seemed an interesting place to go, and before I knew it I was hooked". He began his radio career as an announcer on Wellington's 2ZB in 1953. Given the lack of formal training at the time he entered the industry, it was ironic that Sherley should go on to become a trainer of announcers. After moving through the ranks of the National Broadcasting Service, in such roles as Chief Announcer at 1XH in Hamilton, he became a key figure at the NZBC Announcer Training School and served there from 1966 to 1975. During this time Sherley tutored such announcers as Paul Holmes, Kevin Black, Dougal Stevenson, Wayne Mowat, and Sharon Crosbie, Relda Familton, Stewart Macpherson, Angela D'Audney, Lloyd Scott, and Lindsay Yeo.

The NZBC was dissolved in 1975 with Radio New Zealand becoming responsible for radio broadcasting in New Zealand. That year, Sherley was seconded to National Radio (now Radio New Zealand National) and became a senior executive producer in charge of announcing staff on both National Radio and the Concert Programme. He also started his long-running radio programme, In a Mellow Tone, in 1975. Originally called Gentle on your Mind, and later Music to Midnight, the format of In a Mellow Tone continued for over thirty years. Sherley was an avid jazz enthusiast, and his programme was a showcase of jazz from both New Zealand and around the world. The show's name came from Duke Ellington's tune of the same name, with the original theme being performed by the Buddy Bregman Orchestra. Later The Manhattan Transfer's version of the song became the theme for the programme.

Sherley actually retired in 1989, but for only six months. After this temporary retirement, he returned to National Radio to continue with a number of projects, including such shows as Take Five and to narrate the series, Last of the World Wars.

The final In a Mellow Tone was aired on Radio New Zealand National on 21 March 2007, followed by a tribute show hosted by Wayne Mowat on 23 March. During July and August 2007, Radio New Zealand National replayed a selection of In a Mellow Tone programmes from 2004 to 2006 as a tribute to Sherley.

== Later life and death ==
Sherley retired for the final time in March 2007 following his last In a Mellow Tone programme, thus ending a career spanning over 50 years. He died at Paraparaumu on 14 June 2007. The then Minister for Broadcasting, Steve Maharey expressed his sorrow at Sherley's death, an indication of his extensive involvement and contribution to broadcasting in New Zealand.

== Honours and awards ==
In the 1989 Queen's Birthday Honours, Sherley was awarded the Queen's Service Medal for public services. He received the outstanding contribution award at the Mobil Radio Awards in 1993.
