= Brian Perkins =

British broadcaster

- Born: 11 September 1943 (age 83); Wanganui, New Zealand
- Occupation: Newsreader

Brian Perkins (born 11 September 1943 in Wanganui, New Zealand) is a former senior newsreader on BBC Radio 4.

== Career ==
He first started working in 1962 in Christchurch on radio stations of the New Zealand Broadcasting Service (NZBS), and its successor, the New Zealand Broadcasting Corporation (NZBC). He worked on 3YA, 3YC and sometimes on 3ZB, and in those days all the work was continuity functions. When he came to Wellington at the end of 1962 he started reading the news both on television and on radio. The NZBC introduced him to many forms of radio including compiling programmes, commentary and other functions.

In 1965 he moved to London, and obtained a role announcing and newsreading for the BBC.

A keen musician, he began by learning the cello and changed to a double bass. While in London he attended the Guildhall School of Music. In 1969 he went back to New Zealand to play the double bass with the New Zealand Symphony Orchestra. Nine years later he returned to Britain to work exclusively for BBC Radio 4, although he also appeared on Noel Edmonds's Sunday morning show on BBC Radio 1 in the early 1980s, and again in a one-off revival of that show in 1992. He retired from the BBC in 2003 on reaching the age of 60.

He specialised in presenting the news in a clear and concise way. In 2006, he was voted the third most popular voice on British radio.

== Post-retirement ==
After his retirement, he continued to work as a newsreader on Radio 4, but in a freelance capacity, and also provided formal readings for the comedy programme The News Quiz.

== "The Godfather of Radio 4" ==
From 2000, radio and television comedy impressions show Dead Ringers had a running joke depicting Brian Perkins as the "Godfather of Radio 4", played on the show by impressionist Jon Culshaw. His imitation often refers to himself as "Big Daddy Perkins" and frequently badmouths BBC colleagues, hinting that he's given out various punishment beatings to those who had earned his ire. In one sketch, the Dead Ringers Brian telephoned the real Brian, accusing him of not being hard enough. The real Brian riposted with a claim that he'd put Peter Donaldson's feet in concrete and thrown him into a canal. In the 2007 Ten Years of Blair special of Dead Ringers, Perkins was portrayed as the Godfather of not only the BBC but the entire nation, acting as the British head of state. Brian and Jon later appeared together on the BBC Radio 4 panel game Wireless Wise. Taking it one step further, humorist Danny Wallace refers to Perkins as a God in his 2006 travelogue Yes Man.
