= Kathleen O'Brien (film director) =

New Zealand film director, radio presenter, dance teacher and hostess (1906–1978)

Margaret Kathleen O'Brien (7 April 1906 – 13 February 1978) was a New Zealand film director, dance teacher, and radio presenter. One of the first New Zealand women to direct films, she spent 20 years working for government filmmaking body the National Film Unit.

== Career ==
O'Brien was born in Wellington, New Zealand in 1906. After time teaching ballet in Wellington, and living in England, she got a job in Wellington at the country's National Film Unit in 1946. O'Brien directed her first short film for the NFU the following year. Australian-born filmmaker Margaret Thomson had begun directing films at the NFU the decade before O'Brien. When Thomson left the unit to work in England in 1949, O'Brien stayed on and remained the only female director on the NFU staff for the next 20 years. She directed the film Graduate Harvest in 1954 and A Letter to the Teacher in 1957.

O'Brien never gained recognition during her lifetime. She died in Wellington on 13 February 1978.
