= Murray Deaker =

New Zealand sports broadcaster

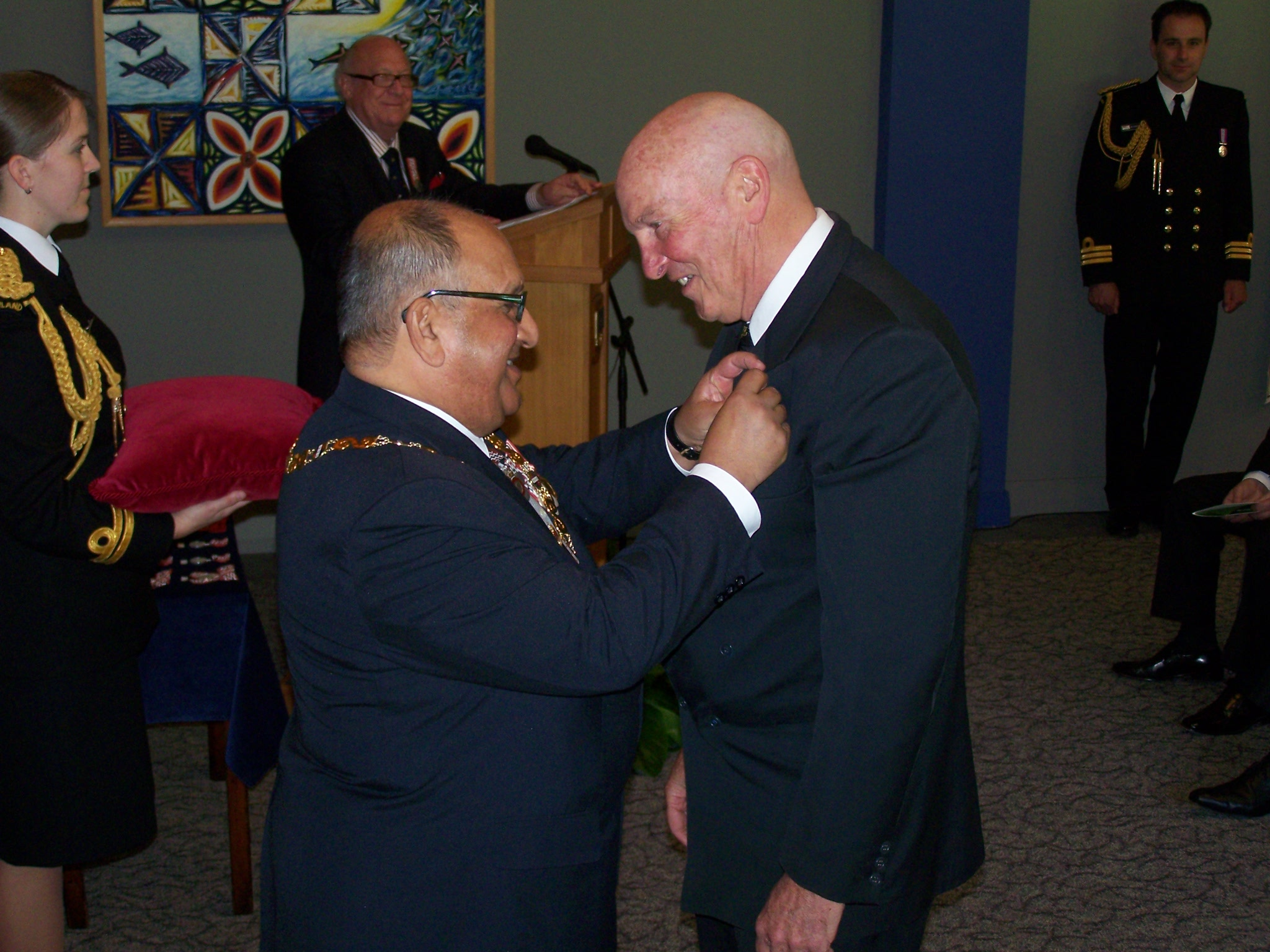
Deaker's investiture as an Officer of the New Zealand Order of Merit, for services to broadcasting, by the governor-general, Sir Anand Satyanand, in 2009

Murray James Boyd Deaker ONZM is a New Zealand sports radio and television talk show host and sports author.

Deaker was educated at Dunedin's King's High School, the same school in which fellow broadcaster Peter Montgomery attended. He graduated from the University of Otago with an MA in history. He worked as a teacher prior to his media career, including at Auckland Grammar (where he successfully coached the First Cricket XI), Orewa College and Takapuna Grammar School. As a former rugby player he had represented Otago and played for the New Zealand Teachers Team.

Deaker was diagnosed with bipolar disorder in 2003. Deaker has acted as a mentor for sports personalities such as Jesse Ryder, a New Zealand cricketer.

His radio programmes consistently rated number one. Deaker was known for getting interviews on his radio and television shows with sports people that were famous and/or topical but also gave time to minority sports. He worked with producers such as Greg Billings and his show helped raise the profile of new and rising sports presenters such as Melodie Robinson and the return to the television screen of Tony Veitch. He conducted a number of high-profile interviews, including the last interview with Tiger Woods before his tabloid controversies of 2009. Deaker fell into his own bunker of controversy in 2011, with a racially sensitive slur in reference to a colleague. Despite the NZ Race Relations Commissioner describing the turn of phrase as "Not appropriate" and a weight of public outrage reminiscent of fellow broadcaster Paul Holmes' "Cheeky Darkie" saga and Paul Henry's derogatory comment about an Indian Diplomat with the surname "Dikshit", Deaker's network described the phrase as "widely used". Deaker later apologised, stating "It was a bad choice of words and I apologise unreservedly".

In March 2012, Deaker again became enmeshed in another controversy after allegedly offensive remarks about All Black and Muslim Sonny Bill Williams

At the end of 2013 Deaker, then aged 68 years, announced he would move on from his position at Newstalk ZB and from his Sky TV programme, Deaker on Sport. "Timing is everything in sport and life. I want to get out while I'm still at the top of my game. There are fresh challenges that I am keen to have a crack at," says Deaker.

Deaker won the Best Sports Presenter at the Radio Awards seven times and was a finalist on 10 other occasions. In the 2009 Queen's Birthday Honours, Deaker was appointed an Officer of the New Zealand Order of Merit, for services to broadcasting.
