= Jim Mora (broadcaster) =

New Zealand media personality

- Born: John James Chanel Mora; Christchurch, New Zealand
- Education: University of Otago
- Occupations: Television and radio presenter
- Spouse: Mary Lambie
- Children: 3

John James Chanel Mora is a New Zealand media personality.

== Biography ==
Mora was born in Christchurch. He attended Otago Boys' High School. His broadcasting career began on student radio in Dunedin in the 1970s, where he had studied at the University of Otago, and later at the independent station 4XO, where he became breakfast host and programme director. During his time at university, Mora was editor of the university newspaper Critic, and a member of the student council. He was also on an undefeated debating team which featured broadcaster and former politician Michael Laws and Auckland University Law professor Mark Henaghan.

In the 1980s, Mora became frontperson – with a variety of co-hosts - for two southern TV current affairs shows: '7.30 South' and 'The South Tonight'. In the 1990s, he was a reporter on the ground-breaking television current affairs programme 'Holmes' (hosted by Paul Holmes), and then became the narrator for 'Tux Wonderdogs' and various reality television shows and documentaries. With broadcaster Mark Leishman and Mark's wife Jo (a television producer), he created and co-presented the popular series 'Battle of the Ballroom', and then became the host of the long-running makeover programme Mucking In. Mucking In featured a series of top New Zealand landscapers (including Tony Murrell and Richard Greenwood), and rewarded altruistic kiwis with new and sometimes spectacular gardens. It had a 10-year run with more than 100 episodes and was regularly high in audience ratings surveys.

In the 2000s, Mora teamed up with a noted NZ animator, the late Brent Chambers from Flux Animation. Together they worked on two series that sold internationally: Massey Ferguson (about the life of a tractor on a farm) and Staines Down Drains (about creatures that live subterranean lives under our feet). SDD was played in more than 40 markets, and at the time was the biggest television cartoon series to come out of New Zealand. Children's books were published in connection with various of their animation projects. Mora has written for a number of book projects and has been a columnist for Metro magazine and the Sunday Star-Times. He has directed several TV documentaries, and presented the regularly-viewed doco 'New Zild' (director John Milligan), about the particular ways and dialects of New Zealand English.

Mora currently hosts the Sunday Morning programme on RNZ National. He has won Silver at the New York Festivals as a talk-show host, is a former NZ Young Broadcaster of the Year, and has won national awards for TV directing, column writing and television news reporting. Mora has also been a 'Best on the Box' (people's choice) award winner. He also hosted the RNZ show Afternoons.

Mora lives in central Auckland with partner Mary Lambie, herself an award-winning journalist and the former host of 'Good Morning' on TVONE. They have three children, a dog (Charlie) and a cat (George).

== See also ==
- List of New Zealand television personalities
