= Rick Ellis (New Zealander) =

Rick Ellis is a New Zealand businessman who was the chief executive of Wellington's Museum of New Zealand Te Papa Tongarewa from 2014 to 2017. Prior to this position, he was group managing director of Telstra subsidiary Telstra Digital Media. Before joining Telstra, Ellis was CEO of TVNZ.
