= Ruud Kleinpaste =

New Zealand naturalist (born 1952)

Ruud Kleinpaste MNZM
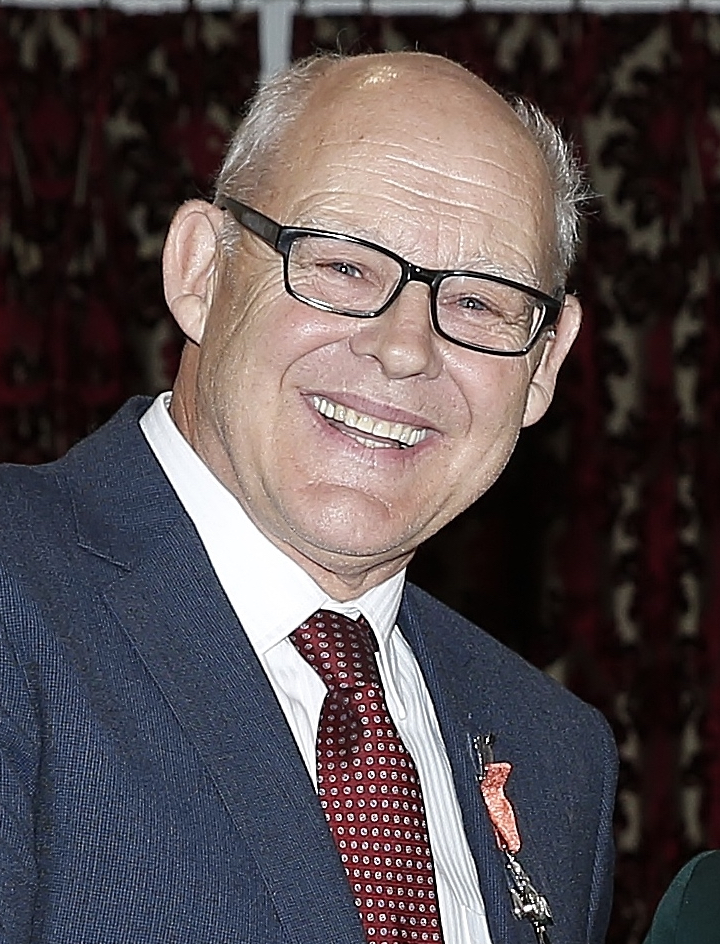
- Kleinpaste in 2018
- Born: Rudolf Hendrik Kleinpaste; 23 April 1952 (age 74); Jakarta, Indonesia
- Education: Wageningen University
- Scientific career
- Fields: Entomology

Rudolf Hendrik Kleinpaste MNZM (born 23 April 1952), generally known as Ruud Kleinpaste, is a New Zealand naturalist and host of the Animal Planet series Buggin' with Ruud.

== Biography ==
Born in Jakarta, Indonesia, on 23 April 1952, Kleinpaste was educated in The Netherlands, and then studied plant sciences at Wageningen University, eventually earning a degree in silviculture. At the age of 20, he became interested in entomology.

After immigrating to New Zealand in 1978, he worked in various environmental jobs before settling down to 14 years in the Ministry of Agriculture and Fisheries (MAF). In 1987 he started a talkback radio show (Ruud's Awakening) in which he offers environmentally friendly horticultural tips to gardeners. He married New Zealander Julia May in 1985; they have one daughter and two sons and live in Auckland.

The success of this show led to some fame in New Zealand, where he is known as "the Bugman", notably on Maggie's Garden Show from 1992 till the end of the programme in December 2003. He retired from MAF in the middle 1990s for a career as an ecological consultant. This line of work has led to television work inside and outside New Zealand, which has brought further fame for him and his environmental causes. These include promoting environmentally friendly agricultural techniques, the protection of endangered native New Zealand birds, and, most famously, the understanding and appreciation of insects, spiders, and other terrestrial arthropods.

In the 2018 New Year Honours, Kleinpaste was appointed an honorary Member of the New Zealand Order of Merit for services to entomology, conservation and entertainment.

== See also ==
- List of New Zealand television personalities
