= Pat Brittenden =

New Zealand broadcaster

Pat Brittenden (born 1973) is a New Zealand broadcaster, blogger and political commentator.

== Education and broadcasting career ==
Pat Brittenden was raised in Roman Catholic family. Educated in Auckland at Sacred Heart College and St Peter's College, Brittenden worked in current affairs and talkback for Newstalk ZB from 2004 until his resignation at the end of 2011. His stated reason for resigning was "to pursue some personal business opportunities".

Brittenden has also worked for More FM Auckland, Coastline FM (now More FM Tauranga), Life FM, Newstalk ZB and Radio Rhema. He was for a time the weekend breakfast announcer at Classic Hits.

Brittenden has been recognised both in New Zealand, and internationally for his broadcasting work including multiple wins at the 2014 New York Festival for World's Best Radio Programmes, in London with the Association for International Broadcasting (AIB) for his work on Newstalk BC, an hour of radio theatre re-imagining the classic Christmas story for a 21st-century audience as a talk radio station set in Jerusalem on the morning of the 'first Christmas'. Brittenden hosted the show and also co-wrote and co-directed it with the Christian Broadcasting Association.

== Podcasting ==
In the lead up to the 2011 New Zealand general election Brittenden created a podcast with comedian Jeremy Elwood called the Slightly Correct Political Show. The show was broadcast on Facebook and featured a number of political figures. During this time Brittenden was employed by TVNZ's Breakfast programme providing election commentary.

Brittenden relocated to Dunedin with his family. As of May 2025, Brittenden and Mike "Chewie" Bennett are the hosts of a daily news podcast called the Big Hairy Network (BHN). BHN is part of a progressive media network called DOC Studios, which was founded in 2020 as a podcast show covering national and international current events.

== Acting ==
Brittenden had small guest parts in Shortland Street, TV3 children's drama Secret Agent Man, and as a VJ on Juice TV. He had a recurring role as security guard Merv in the 2008 political satire The Pretender.

== Views and positions ==
Brittenden has supported the teaching of the Māori language in schools, arguing it would help promote cultural understanding and child brain development.
