= Radio Hauraki =

New Zealand radio station

- New Zealand

Programming
- Format: Modern rock, alternative rock

Ownership
- Owner: NZME Radio

History
- First air date: 1966

Links
- Webcast: iHeart Radio
- Website: www.hauraki.co.nz

Radio Hauraki is a New Zealand rock music station that started in 1966. It was the first private commercial radio station of the modern broadcasting era in New Zealand and operated illegally until 1970 to break the monopoly held by the state-owned New Zealand Broadcasting Corporation. From its founding until 2012 Hauraki played a mix of classic and mainstream rock music. In 2013, it changed its music content, playing modern rock and alternative rock from the last 35–40 years. In its modern legal form, Radio Hauraki's head office and main studios are now located at 2 Graham Street in the Auckland CBD, as one of eight stations of NZME Radio.

Private commercial radio stations had operated from the earliest days of broadcasting, but the government began to close them down, the process accelerating after World War II. To break the state monopoly, Radio Hauraki was originally formed as a pirate station in the Hauraki Gulf, in a history that saw the loss of one life.

== History ==
=== Early years ===
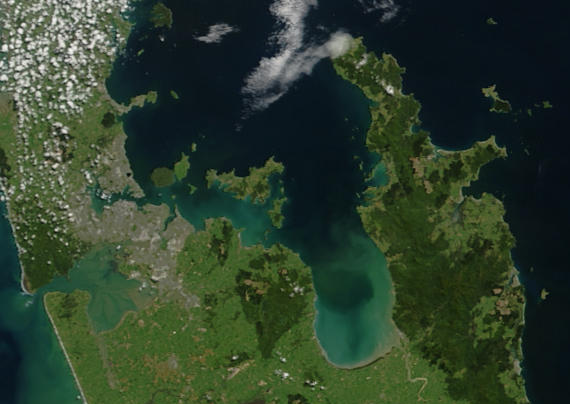
Radio Hauraki was originally broadcast offshore from New Zealand in the Hauraki Gulf.

The concept of Radio Hauraki originated with a group of journalists who felt dissatisfied with New Zealand Broadcasting Corporation (NZBC) radio stations, and with the politics involved with broadcasting in New Zealand. Private stations were able to apply for licences to operate, but the New Zealand Broadcasting Service (NZBS) stonewalled all applications. A small group involving David Gapes, Derek Lowe, Ian Magan, Chris Parkinson and Denis O'Callahan decided, with legal assistance, to start a private venture operating in international waters, outside of the confines of the monopolistic government departments of the NZBC, which ran all land-based radio stations, and of the New Zealand Post Office, which managed the radio spectrum. Gapes, Lowe, Magan, Parkinson and O'Callahan eventually broke the radio monopoly, thus allowing private radio to become widespread in New Zealand.

The five men bought a boat and tried to make it seaworthy, however the Marine Department continuously rejected their application for a warrant of fitness for the ship. So in 1966 the crew set sail anyway without the WOF. However the ship got caught on a drawbridge in the Auckland Viaduct and the crew were arrested. When they went to court the judge ruled in favour of them and in late 1966, the Tiri, the boat chosen to carry the transmitter, anchored in the Hauraki Gulf outside the 3-mile territorial-water limit. The station broadcast on the frequency of 1480 kHz – well outside the range of frequencies used by the NZBC. After testing the transmitter with a broadcast from pirate announcer Bob Leahy, and having to replace the mast after winds of more than 30 knots knocked it down, Radio Hauraki officially started broadcasting on 4 December 1966.

=== Pirate radio ===
Slogans
- Radio Hauraki, Top of The Dial
- Radio Hauraki: Home of the good guys
- Here to rock, not to shock
- Rocking the Boat for 40 years
- Classic rock that rocks
- New Zealand's real rock station
- Just great rock
- We Endorse This Music
- Its Different
- Louder Communities Together

During the next two years, the crew on the Tiri would endure adverse weather conditions, fatigue, and continued efforts to shut down the station. On 28 January 1968 disaster struck as the Tiri attempted to negotiate its way into Whangaparapara Harbour on Great Barrier Island in foul weather. The ship ran aground on rocks, with Radio Hauraki disc jockey Paul Lineham keeping listeners up-to-date with running commentary. The final broadcast from the Tiri was "Hauraki News: Hauraki crew is abandoning ship. This is Paul Lineham aboard the 'Tiri'. Good Night." followed by a station jingle. The "Tiri" was later towed back to Auckland and the broadcasting equipment was salvaged. However, the Tiri herself was beyond repair and was replaced four days later by the Kapuni, christened Tiri II by her new crew. A month after the loss of the Tiri, Radio Hauraki was back in international waters and broadcasting again.

In April of the same year Tiri II found herself beached again at Whangaparapara Harbour, a victim of the same storm that resulted in the Wahine disaster. After repairs she was back at sea in five days. Between this time and June 1968, Tiri II would end up beached at Uretiti Beach and caught several times broadcasting from New Zealand waters by radio inspectors. Just before Christmas 1968, Radio Hauraki became New Zealand's first 24-hour broadcasting radio station. Radio Hauraki was not live radio. The studios were land-based and most programs were recorded on reel-to-reel tapes in 1/2-hour segments approximately one week prior to their broadcast. This meant that while contests, current top tunes, etc. could be accommodated, news and weather were more of a challenge.

Tiri was owned by AG Frankham Ltd and was registered as a barge. After running aground at Whangaparapara on 28 January 1968, it was laid up at Limestone Island near Whangarei. The search and rescue boat Marauder was owned by Bill Gibbs and Tryphena. Kapuni, also owned by AG Frankham Ltd, became known as Tiri II only during Hauraki service from 1968 to 1970. It was laid up on Rotoroa Island in the Hauraki Gulf.

=== Legal radio ===
In mid-1970, the state monopoly on radio frequencies was broken, with the New Zealand Broadcasting Authority finally allowing Radio Hauraki to broadcast on land, legally. The Radio Hauraki crew had spent 1,111 days at sea. The final broadcast from the seabound Hauraki Pirates was a documentary on the station's history until that point, finishing at 10:00 p.m. when Tiri II turned and headed for Auckland playing "Born Free" continually. During their final voyage back to shore, announcer Rick Grant was lost overboard.

On 23 November 1978, Radio Hauraki moved from 1480 kHz to 1476 kHz as part of the change from 10 kHz spacing to 9 kHz spacing on the AM band.

Radio Hauraki began FM transmission in 1990 on 99.0FM, and the 1476 kHz frequency was subsequently acquired by a local community group to broadcast the BBC World Service. During the late nineties Radio Hauraki was networked into other regions around the North Island of New Zealand and in 2003 Radio Hauraki was networked into the South Island in Christchurch, Dunedin and Invercargill. Veteran pirate announcer Bob Leahy remained a newsreader for The Radio Network right up until 2009, which saw him remain on-air on Radio Hauraki some 40 years after he helped begin the station.

After several changes in ownership Radio Hauraki is now operated by NZME Radio becoming a radio network broadcasting across New Zealand. Up until 2012 Hauraki played a mix of classic and mainstream rock music from the '60s til now. In 2013, Hauraki changed its music content playing modern rock and alternative rock from the last 25 years, also changed their positioning statement to "It's Different" to coincide with their change in format. Current hosts include high-profile personalities such as: Jeremy Wells, Leigh Hart, Jason Hoyte and Mike Minogue. The station claims its recent changes have resulted in a substantial increase in listeners. A film dramatising Radio Hauraki's early years, 3 Mile Limit, was released in 2014.

== Programmes ==
=== Former hosts ===
Previous Radio Hauraki hosts include Len McChesney, Christopher Parkinson, Ross Goodwin, Pat Courtenay, Paddy O'Donnell, Bob Leahy, Mike Parkinson, Ward Austin, Gavin Comber, Dave White, Robert Taylor, Thane Kirby (Duke of Rock), Dave Gray, Ian Johnston, Barry Knight (Simeon), Aaron Ironside, Ian Ferguson, Paul Lineham, Lynnaire Johnston, Rick Grant, Colin Broadley, Carl Olsen, Keith Ashton, Andy Faulkner, Michael Gammon, Trudy Rana, Phil Gifford, John Hawkesby, Ian Magan, Leah Panapa, Brian Strong, Peter Telling, Dean Lonergan, Fred Botica, Mark Perry, Dean Butler, Willy De Witt, Dean Young, Mel Homer, Nick Trott, Nik Brown, Mark Woods, Mike Currie, Sarah McMullan, Martin Devlin, Matt Heath, and Laura McGoldrick.

Phillip Schofield was a host on Radio Hauraki in 1983, a year after becoming the host of youth music programme Shazam! in 1982. He left the station in 1985 to return to the United Kingdom and become one of Britain's most well-known television personalities. During almost 30 years as a BBC Television and ITV presenter, Schofield was the first continuity announcer for Children's BBC and the host of the Smash Hits Poll Winners Party, Dancing on Ice, All Star Mr & Mrs, The Cube and This Morning.

Former Radio Hauraki breakfast host Kevin Black became New Zealand's highest-paid radio DJ, and served as breakfast host for Solid Gold between 1997 and 2009 before his death in 2013.

== Frequencies ==
Market	Location	Frequency
Northland	Kaitaia	93.2
Northland	Bay of Islands	93.2
Northland	Whangārei	93.2
Auckland	Auckland	99.0
Waikato	Hamilton	96.2
Bay of Plenty	Tauranga	91.0
Rotorua	Rotorua	87.8
Gisborne	Gisborne	105.3
Taupō	Taupō	92.8
Taranaki	New Plymouth	90.8
Hawke's Bay	Hawke's Bay	96.7
Whanganui	Whanganui	87.6
Manawatu	Palmerston North	87.6
Wellington	Wellington	93.3
Nelson	Nelson	90.4
Marlborough	Blenheim	98.5
Buller	Westport	89.3
West Coast	Greymouth	105.1
Canterbury	Christchurch	106.5
Canterbury	Sumner	89.3
Otago	Dunedin	1125
Otago	Dunedin	95.8
Central Otago	Wānaka	97.0
Southland	Invercargill	93.2

== Controversies ==
=== Broadcasting standards breaches ===
In November 2016, the Broadcasting Standards Authority (BSA) upheld two complaints regarding the Hauraki Breakfast Show on 4 April 2016. Deborah Stokes, mother of cricketer Ben Stokes, called the station to complain about comments made about her son. She explicitly asked to speak off-air, and host Matt Heath falsely assured her she was. The conversation was in fact broadcast live. The BSA found this a serious breach of privacy and fairness standards, and NZME’s response was deemed inadequate despite offering compensation due to the deceptive conduct and the hosts' subsequent behaviour. Radio Hauraki was ordered to issue a on-air statement, to pay $4,000 in compensation to Mrs Stokes, and to pay $4,000 in costs to the Crown.
