= Newshub =

New Zealand news TV programme

- Also known as: 3 National News (1989–1998); 3 News (1998–2016)
- Presented by: Sam Hayes and Mike McRoberts (weeknights, Newshub Live at 6pm); Laura Tupou (weekends, Newshub Live at 6pm); Nicky Styris, Michael O'Keefe (AM)
- Country of origin: New Zealand

Production
- Production locations: 3 Flower Street; Eden Terrace, Auckland, New Zealand
- Camera setup: Multi-camera
- Running time: 6 am: 180 minutes; 6 pm: 60 minutes; (all including advertisements)
- Production companies: TVWorks (1989–2004); MediaWorks (2004–2020); Discovery, Inc. (2020–2022); Warner Bros. Discovery (2022–2024)

Original release
- Network: Three
- Release: 26 November 1989 – 5 July 2024

Related
- ThreeNews (2024–present)

Newshub (stylised as Newshub.) was a New Zealand news service that operated from 1989 to 2024 and served as the local news division of Warner Bros. Discovery New Zealand until its closure. The division, known as 3 News until 2016, had produced news bulletins and current affairs programming for the television channel Three from its inception. It also operated a news website and on radio stations run by MediaWorks between 2016 and 2021.

The Newshub brand was launched in February 2016 as part of the division's transition to digital journalism. MediaWorks sold Three and Newshub to US multimedia company Discovery, Inc., with the acquisition completed in December 2020.

On 28 February 2024, it was announced that Newshub would shut down on 5 July 2024. On 10 April 2024, the closure was confirmed by Warner Bros. Discovery, with Newshub winding down on 5 July 2024. Media company Stuff was commissioned to produce a new nightly bulletin, named ThreeNews.

== History ==
=== 3 News ===
External videos
- 3 National News – First Bulletin, 27 November 1989 via NZ on Screen

3 News logo that was used until 31 January 2016.

The TV3 6pm news bulletin was known as 3 News or 3 News at 6pm up until 31 January 2016. 3 News was originally known as 3 National News and first went on air on Monday 27 November 1989 when TV3 began broadcasting, which made it the first serious challenger to TVNZ. For the first year of broadcast, 3 National News was a thirty-minute bulletin screening at 6:30 pm, which the same time slot as Holmes on TV1. The original bulletin was presented by former BCNZ and TVNZ anchor Philip Sherry, joined by sportscaster Greg Clark and weathercaster Belinda Todd.

In 1991 TV3 extended 3 National News to a 1-hour bulletin starting at 6 pm, this occurred during the Gulf War but TV3 continued to screen a 1-hour bulletin following the war. TV3 used their 1-hour news bulletin of 3 National News as a selling point over One Network News which was still a 30-minute bulletin followed by the Holmes show, One Network News did not become a 1-hour bulletin until 1995. During the nine years that the bulletin was known as 3 National News it had three different hosts. Original presenter Philip Sherry was replaced by Joanna Paul in mid-1990; Paul had previously been the presenter of the launch news update and weekend bulletins. When Paul opted not to renew her contract with the network, TV3 hired former TVNZ newsreader and It's in the Bag game show host, John Hawkesby.

During the 1990s, Canadian media conglomerate CanWest acquired ownership of TV3 and 3 National News.

On 16 February 1998, TV3 revamped its presentation, shortening the show's name to 3 News and adding another presenter. They initially planned for Hawkesby and ex-TVNZ journalist Carol Hirschfeld to co-present. The planned Hawkesby-Hirschfeld team never eventuated, with John Campbell taking the male presenter role when Hawkesby walked out of TV3 to host One News. TV3 later sued TVNZ for "interfering with the relationship" between Hawkesby and TV3. The two parties settled out of court at the end of 2000 for an undisclosed amount.

In March 2005, Hirschfeld and Campbell left their presenting positions to collaborate on current affairs show Campbell Live. They were replaced by Hilary Barry and Mike McRoberts. The same year, 3 News won the Best News Award at the Qantas Television Awards. In 2005, TV3's parent company Mediaworks New Zealand launched Radio Live.

A standalone website launched in 2006. Before then, news items were posted to TV3's main website. When the new website started, it emphasised the use of video.

In 2007, the Australian capital investment firm Ironbridge Capital acquired TV3 and established MediaWorks New Zealand, which became 3 News' parent company. A new 3 News studio set began use on 15 September 2008, this coincided with an updated graphics package using the 2005 – 2008 graphics as its base. On 4 July 2011, 3 News revamped its presentation package starting with the early morning show of the time Firstline, to have the "floating tiles" look, which was in use up till the launch of Newshub on 1 February 2016.

In November 2012, 3 News won the Best News award at the 2012 New Zealand Television Awards.

On 27 January 2014, 3 News refreshed its split screen graphic, finance graphics and full frame graphics. At the same time, 3 News also updated their printed fake newsroom backdrop which they used while they temporarily broadcast from a green/blue screen set.

In 2014, MediaWorks recruited broadcaster Paul Henry to TV3 as part of its plan to replace Nightline, the channel's late-night programme. Henry later hosted TV3's new breakfast programme.

In early April 2015, it was announced that 3 News' Sunday bulletin would be reduced to half an hour and would be followed by a shortened version of the network's midweek current affairs programme 3rd Degree, which was later renamed "3D". The first of these shortened Sunday bulletins was broadcast on 24 May 2015.

In April 2015, MediaWorks announced a review of Campbell Live due to declining ratings. In June 2015, "Campbell Live" was replaced with a new programme called "The Story."

On 19 December 2015, Studio 1 was decommissioned temporarily to prepare the studio for the launch of Newshub. During the refit of Studio 1, they broadcast from a green screen studio placed in the Paul Henry show set during the summer off-air time.

The last 3 News broadcast occurred on 31 January 2016 before the news brand renamed to Newshub. The new look Studio 1 launched on 1 February 2016 designed by Jago Design, who also designed Studio 3, which is used for Paul Henry.

=== MediaWorks ===
MediaWorks launched Newshub on 1 February 2016 as a multi-platform news service to replace the former 3 News service on its television channel Three and the Radio Live news service. Newshub was envisioned as an integrated television, online and radio newsroom.

In March 2016, a Newshub journalist broke embargo and leaked sensitive information about a 25 basis point cut by the Reserve Bank to the Official Cash Rate (OCR). Newshub's parent company MediaWorks conducted their own investigation on the leak, and followed up with an apology from CEO Mark Weldon (former head of the New Zealand Stock exchange), although Weldon stopped short of naming the journalist involved. As a result of the loss of trust with the media, the Reserve Bank has elected to discontinue the media lockup prior to future releases of the OCR. In addition, the Reserve Bank banned MediaWorks journalists from all its future press conferences.

=== Discovery, 2020–2022 ===
On 7 September 2020, MediaWorks sold Newshub and its television arm to US multimedia company Discovery, Inc. At the time, Newshub was expected to continue providing bulletins to MediaWorks Radio, as well as producing the joint TV/radio programme The AM Show. The acquisition of MediaWorks' television arm was finalised on 1 December 2020, with the subsidiary being rebranded as Discovery New Zealand. Following Discovery's acquisition, Newshub re-launched its midday news bulletin, reformatted its morning show "AM" and launched an 8:00 PM news bulletin.

In mid-May 2021, Newshub closed its Dunedin office as part of parent company Discovery's restructuring of its business operations in Australia and New Zealand. The Dunedin newsroom consisted of reporter Dave Goosselink and camera operator Grant Findlay. Following the closure of the Dunedin office, the network's South Island operations consist of its Christchurch–based bureau as well as freelancers.

In early October 2021, Discovery NZ announced plans to launch a new Newshub Live at 8 pm bulletin in March 2022 on its upcoming TV channel eden. Around the same time, it was announced that former owner Mediaworks would end its content supply agreement with Newshub, and establish its own radio newsroom employing over 20 news and sports journalists, editors and correspondents.

=== Warner Bros. Discovery and closure, 2023–2024 ===
Following Discovery's merger with WarnerMedia to former Warner Bros. Discovery in April 2022, the new entity acquired Discovery's New Zealand assets including Newshub and Three.

By 2023, a recession and declining advertising revenue led Newshub to implement cuts. In August 2023, Newshub discontinued its 5:30 am and 12 pm news bulletins. In October 2023, Newshub ended its 7pm current affairs programme The Project, which led to the loss of 24 jobs. The company later scrapped plans for a replacement current affairs show helmed by AM presenter Ryan Bridge. That same month, Senior news head Sara Bristow was replaced by interim news head Richard Sutherland. Newshub also instituted a "sinking lid" policy limiting new hires.

On 28 February 2024, parent company Warner Bros. Discovery announced a proposal to close Newshub on 30 June that year. The head of Warner Bros. Discovery Asia-Pacific, James Gibbons, stated "We simply cannot afford to produce news in-house". The proposed closure is expected to lead to the loss of about 200 jobs including journalists, producers, editors, camera operators and associated staff. Several days before the announcement, Warner Bros proposed merging the news gathering divisions of 1News and Newshub, which was rejected by TVNZ.

Prime Minister Christopher Luxon said that government intervention would be "highly unlikely". ACT leader David Seymour said that the closure announcement was a "sad day for New Zealand's democracy which requires a competitive media market so that people can get a wide range of views about what's happening in their country." Deputy Prime Minister Winston Peters described it as "disaster for [the] country's democracy". Journalist Peter Bale said that there was a "hideous inevitability" about the closure, believing that Warner Bros "most certainly doesn't care about the news market in New Zealand".

On 10 April 2024, the Newshub closure was confirmed by Warner Bros. Discovery, leading to up to 300 job losses, with Newshub airing its final bulletin and winding down on 5 July 2024. On 10 May, the National Business Review confirmed that McRoberts would be taking up position as Te Ao Māori Editor, focusing on stories about Māori economic development in New Zealand. On 13 May, The New Zealand Herald confirmed it had recruited Newshub journalist Michael Morrah into its editorial team with a focus on producing online news video content.

=== Stuff ===
On 16 April 2024, it was announced that Stuff will provide news for Three and Warner Bros. Discovery starting 6 July. Stuff will provide an hour-long bulletin at 6 pm on weekdays and will provide a 30 minute bulletin at 6 pm on weekends. Stuff publisher Sinead Boucher also confirmed that Stuff would hire several former Newshub staff (less than 40–50) to produce the 6pm bulletins. Newshub's website will be given to Stuff, but as of April, there have not been plans on what Stuff will do with it.

On 7 May, Stuff announced that seven former Newshub journalists including Samantha Hayes, Jenna Lynch, Laura Tupou, Ollie Ritchie, Juliet Speedy, Zane Small and Heather Keats would join Stuff's 6pm news bulletin, named ThreeNews, and Stuff's "ecosystem of news products."

Following the end of the last Newshub bulletin, the website ceased updating, with plans to migrate its archived content to Stuff. The content migration was finished by December 2024.

== Newshub television bulletins ==
=== Newshub Live at 6pm ===
The flagship 6pm bulletin of Newshub was co-anchored by Mike McRoberts and Samantha Hayes. Newshub Live at 6pm replaced the news bulletin at the same time, previously known as 3 News at 6pm.

The final episode was aired on Friday 5 July 2024.

=== AM ===
A new breakfast television show began on Tuesday 8 February 2022, with the name changing to AM. The newly reformatted AM show was presented by Ryan Bridge, Melissa Chan-Green, Bernadine Oliver-Kerby and William Waiirua. AM broadcast weekdays from 6-9am.

The final episode was aired on Friday 5 July 2024.

== Former news shows ==
=== Newshub Late ===
Newshub Late was the late night edition of Newshub which usually aired weeknights around 9:30pm, but could run either earlier or later depending on the evening schedule. The show was anchored by Rebecca Wright

This was Three's fourth late news programme with the original programme being Nightline between 1990 and 2013, The Paul Henry Show in 2014 and Newsworthy in 2015. On 21 March 2022, an in-programme graphics revamp took place changing its set and format similar to the 8pm bulletin.

The final episode was aired on Friday 31 May 2024.

=== Newshub Nation ===
Newshub Nation was Three's in-depth political current affairs show focusing on the major players and forces that shape New Zealand. It launched as The Nation by veteran political reporter Richard Harman in 2010. It was rebranded as Newshub Nation in February 2018. The show was later presented by Simon Shepherd and Rebecca Wright and aired on Saturdays at 9:30 am and Sundays at 10 am. Former co-host Emma Jolliff died on 6 February 2020.

The final episode was aired on Saturday 2 December 2023.

=== The Paul Henry Show ===
Paul Henry was a cross-platform, morning breakfast news programme broadcast live on TV3 and Radio Live on weekdays between 6:00am and 9:00am. It was presented by Paul Henry with Ingrid Hipkiss as news presenter, and Jim Kayes as sports presenter. The show began to air on 7 April 2015 (replacing Firstline) and retained its name after other 3 News shows were renamed to Newshub.

=== Story ===
Story was a 30-minute current affairs show presented by Duncan Garner and Heather du Plessis-Allan. The show aired Monday to Thursday nights at 7:00 pm, with a less formal chat / entertainment show on Friday evenings at 7 pm. Story was first launched on 10 August 2015 and replaced Campbell Live. On 16 December 2016, Story had its final show. Story's frontman, Duncan Garner, and co-host, Amanda Gillies, moved to the breakfast timeslot, for The AM Show.

=== The Project ===
The Project was a New Zealand current affairs show presented by Jesse Mulligan, Kanoa Lloyd, and Jeremy Corbett. It premiered on Three on 20 February 2017, and aired at 7 pm for half an hour. The show replaced Story. Its format was taken from the Australian version, which is a ratings hit on Network 10.

In late October 2023, Warner Bros. Discovery ANZ confirmed they had commenced discussions to discontinue The Project by December 2023. The final episode aired on 1 December 2023.

=== Campbell Live ===
Campbell Live was a half-hour-long New Zealand current affairs programme that was broadcast on weeknights on TV3 at 7:00 pm (following 3 News) and was presented by New Zealand television personality, John Campbell. It was first broadcast on 21 March 2005 and had its last show broadcast on Friday, 29 May 2015. It was replaced with Story that screened on Monday through Thursday nights, presented by Duncan Garner and Heather du-Plessis Allan.

=== Nightline ===
Nightline was the late night edition of 3 News broadcast, based on the American programme of the same name. It was broadcast live on TV3 at approximately 10:30 pm and was presented by Sacha McNeil. The show concluded on 20 December 2013, being replaced on 27 January 2014 with The Paul Henry Show, of which the final show aired on 19 December 2014. However an interim replacement simply named 3 News was aired for several weeks at the beginning of 2014, and again in 2015 (before Newsworthy began) and 2016 (before Newshub Late began).

=== Firstline ===
Firstline was a morning news programme produced by 3 News. The show was cancelled in April 2015 and was replaced by Paul Henry. It was presented by Rachel Smalley, with Sam Ackerman as the sports presenter. The show began on Monday 7 March 2011 off the back of ongoing Christchurch earthquake coverage.

=== Paul Henry ===
The Paul Henry Show was a weekday late night news & entertainment programme presented by Paul Henry. The show discussed the day's news with Henry's trademark take on events and also featured Janika ter Ellen as news presenter. Airing from 27 January to 19 December 2014, the show replaced the former Nightline in the late night weekday slot. It was replaced by Newsworthy.

=== Newsworthy ===
Newsworthy was the late night edition of 3 News in 2015 and broadcast live on TV3 at around 10:30 pm. It was presented by Samantha Hayes and David Farrier. The show started on 8 June 2015 with mixed reviews, and the final show was broadcast on 18 December 2015.

=== Sports Tonight ===
Sports Tonight was a sports information programme, broadcast live on TV3 weeknights following Nightline. Sports Tonight was presented by 3 News sports journalist Howard Dobson. The show was cancelled at the end of 2012, and its last programme aired on 21 December 2012.

=== 60 Minutes ===
60 Minutes New Zealand was the local arm of the popular television franchise 60 Minutes. It was broadcast on Sunday evenings at 7:30 pm. The programme was presented by 3 News anchor Mike McRoberts. The programme was cancelled at the end of 2012.

=== 3D ===
3D, originally named 3rd Degree, was created as a replacement for 60 Minutes. It was presented by Duncan Garner and Guyon Espiner. It was later changed to a half-hour format and renamed 3D Investigates. Presented by Duncan Garner and Samantha Hayes, it was TV3's flagship weekly current affairs programme, featuring stories from some of New Zealand's top journalists, including Paula Penfold, Sarah Hall, Melanie Reid, Phil Vine and Samantha Hayes.

3D brought a human face to the issues that mattered to Kiwis, confronting the people who needed to be confronted, probing the secrets that needed to be uncovered, and celebrated New Zealanders who were living extraordinary lives. At the end of 2015 3D was cancelled.

=== The Vote ===
The Vote was produced by TV3's News and Current Affairs division with funding from NZ On Air. It screened once every four weeks in the same time slot as 3rd Degree (later 3D), TV3's former one-hour current affairs programme. The Vote was cancelled at the end of 2013.

=== Three60 ===
Three60 was (at the time) TV3's newest current affairs show which focused on international news, politics & business. Three60 was presented by Newshub anchor Mike McRoberts and airs on Sundays at 9:30 am. The show has since been cancelled.

=== Newshub Midday ===
Newshub Midday (formerly 3 News @ 12) was a half-hour bulletin broadcast live on TV3 weekdays at 12:00 pm. The show was presented by Jeff McTainsh.

Newshub Midday was axed in June 2016, airing its last show on 1 July that year. It was replaced by a digital current affairs bulletin called Newshub Explains, which began on 18 July 2016.

Newshub Midday returned as Newshub live at 11:30am on 1 February 2021 airing every weekday until it was axed on 25 August 2023.

=== The AM Show ===
The AM Show was a New Zealand morning news and talk show that airs on Three and simulcast on Magic Talk. It was presented by Duncan Garner and, later, Ryan Bridge, with news anchor Amanda Gillies and sports anchor Mark Richardson, who both announced that they would leave The AM Show in December 2021.

Both Amanda Gillies and Mark Richardson left The AM Show for different opportunities at Discovery. Gillies left the show to take up the role as Newshub's national correspondent and Richardson would continue as the host of The Block NZ and would appear as a fourth host on The Project. Richardson co-hosted an afternoon show on Today FM with Leah Panapa from March 2022 to March 2023.

The show replaced Paul Henry after it was announced the frontman of the show, Paul Henry, was resigning and therefore the show was going to be replaced. The announcement was made by MediaWorks in November 2016, and Paul Henry last aired on 16 December 2016. The AM Show premiered on 13 February 2017.

In 2022, The AM Show was rebranded as and refreshed into AM with new hosts Ryan Bridge and Melissa Chan-Green, news anchor Bernadine Oliver-Kerby and weather presenter William Waiirua.

=== Newshub Live at 4:30 PM ===
Launched on 20 March 2017, as Newshub Live at 4pm, the half hour bulletin and mid-afternoon edition of Newshub aired weekdays at 4:30 pm and was anchored by Oriini Kaipara. It aired at 4 pm until 16 August 2019, when it moved to its final timeslot of 4:30pm. The bulletin was discontinued in late 2022, with the final airing on 11 November 2022.

=== Newshub Live at 8:00 PM ===
First aired on 21 March 2022, the bulletin aired on Eden on weekdays at 8 pm and was anchored by Rebecca Wright. The half hour bulletin covered exclusive interviews as well as the usual daily news in a nightly vibrant format similar to Newshub Late on Three. Newshub Live at 8 pm was taken off air with its last show on 11 November 2022, within its first 12 months on air.

=== AM Early ===
AM Early, a spin-off from the newly reformatted AM show, was a half-hour bulletin from 5:30 am to 6 am where Bernadine Oliver-Kerby updated New Zealanders on overnight news stories and business reports. AM Early’s final hosts were Oriini Kaipara, Nicky Styris and Michael O'Keefe due to Bernadine Oliver-Kerby taking an extended leave of absence for health reasons.

The bulletin was discontinued on 16 August 2023, with the final bulletin airing on 25 August 2023.

=== Newshub Live at 11:30am ===
Announced on 20 January 2021 and launched on 1 February 2021, Newshub Live at 11:30am, was the lunchtime edition of Newshub. The half hour bulletin was similar to Newshub Live at 4:30pm and also narrowed the previously large time gap between AM and the 4:30pm bulletin.

This was Three's third lunchtime news bulletin with the original bulletin being 3 News at 12 between 2007 and 2015 and Newshub Midday in 2016.

The bulletin was discontinued on 16 August 2023, with the final bulletin airing on 25 August 2023.

== Newshub Breaking News Specials ==
Newshub Breaking News Specials are often aired during local and international, one-off and breaking news events. Newshub has aired specials for the following events:

| Date | Event |
|---|---|
| 4 September 2010 | 2010 Canterbury earthquake |
| 22 February 2011 | 2011 Christchurch earthquake |
| 9 November 2016 | 2016 United States presidential election |
| 14 November 2016 | 2016 Kaikōura earthquake |
| 17 February 2017 | 2017 Port Hills fires |
| 6 July 2017 | America's Cup Victory Parade |
| 19 May 2018 | Wedding of Prince Harry and Meghan Markle |
| 15 March 2019 | Christchurch mosque shootings |
| 23 March 2020 | COVID-19 pandemic in New Zealand |
| 17 October 2020 | 2020 New Zealand general election |
| 4 November 2020 | 2020 United States presidential election |
| 3 September 2021 | 2021 Auckland supermarket stabbing |
| 9 September 2022 | Death of Elizabeth II |
| 19 September 2022 | State funeral of Elizabeth II |
| 28 January 2023 | 2023 Auckland Anniversary Weekend floods |
| 13 February 2023 | Cyclone Gabrielle |

During the COVID-19 pandemic in New Zealand a Newshub Special was broadcast most days at 1 pm. During the broadcast former Director-General of Health, Ashley Bloomfield would provide an update on how many new coronavirus cases were detected in New Zealand.

== Newshub journalists ==
| Name | Show | Role | Bureau |
|---|---|---|---|
| Samantha Hayes | Newshub Live at 6 pm | Weeknight co-anchor | Auckland |
| Mike McRoberts | Newshub Live at 6 pm | Weeknight co-anchor | Auckland |
| Laura Tupou | Newshub Live at 6 pm | Weekend anchor/AM fill-in | Auckland |
| Rebecca Wright | Newshub Live at 6pm | Weather Anchor | Auckland |
| Ryan Bridge | AM | Co-host | Auckland |
| Melissa Chan-Green | AM | Co-host | Auckland |
| Bernadine Oliver-Kerby | AM | News anchor | Auckland |
| William Waiirua | AM | Weather presenter | Auckland |
| Patrick Gower | Newshub | National correspondent | Auckland & Wellington |
| Amanda Gillies | Newshub | National correspondent | Auckland |
| Mitch McCann | Newshub | US correspondent | New York |
| Lisette Reymer | Newshub | Europe correspondent | London |
| Emma Cropper | Newshub | Australia correspondent | Sydney |
| Jenna Lynch | Newshub | Political editor | Wellington |
| Amelia Wade | Newshub | Political reporter | Wellington |
| Jamie Ensor | Newshub | Political reporter | Wellington |
| Michael Morrah | Newshub | Pacific affairs correspondent/investigations reporter | Auckland |
| Janika ter Ellen | Newshub & News First | Reporter/weekend anchor | Auckland |
| Andrew Gourdie | Newshub | Sports anchor | Auckland |
| Nicky Styris | Newshub | Sports anchor | Auckland |
