= Ryan Bridge =

New Zealand broadcaster (born 1987)

- Born: November 1987 (age 38–39)
- Citizenship: New Zealander
- Occupation: Broadcaster
- Years active: 2010– present
- Employer: New Zealand Herald

Ryan Bridge (born November 1987) is a New Zealand broadcaster who previously co-hosted the breakfast show AM on Three alongside Melissa Chan-Green and Bernadine Oliver-Kerby. Before this he previously hosted the Ryan Bridge Drive Show on Magic Talk radio. Bridge currently hosts Ryan Bridge TODAY, a live streamed breakfast show for the NZ Herald and Three.

== Early life ==
Bridge grew up in the Kāpiti Coast District, where his first job was delivering newspapers. He was involved with the Youth Council and served as Youth MP for Darren Hughes.

== Career ==
When Bridge was 22 years old, he began working as a political reporter in the press gallery of the New Zealand Parliament. He was also Three's Beijing correspondent and business newsreader for Morning Report on Radio New Zealand.

Bridge has also worked on Three's previous current affairs show Story as a reporter and presenter, as well as Newshub on the same channel.

In 2021, Bridge replaced Duncan Garner on AM, a New Zealand morning breakfast show. He left the show in December 2023.

Bridge had been expected in late 2023 to host an upcoming current affairs show, Bridge on Three. It had been intended to replace The Project which finished in December 2023, although plans to launch the show fell through due to the closure of Newshub in 2024.

Bridge currently hosts the morning breakfast show Ryan Bridge TODAY which is live streamed on the NZ Herald and Three.

== Personal life ==
Bridge lives with his partner Fergy along with their beagle Fanny. It was not until 2021, when previous AM co-host Mark Richardson questioned his sexuality on live television that Bridge shared publicly that he was gay. In June 2023 Bridge announced he was engaged.
