= Geoff Bryan =

New Zealand broadcaster

Geoff Bryan (born 24 April 1956) is a New Zealand television broadcaster, currently a newsreader for MediaWorks Radio and one of the breakfast hosts on Magic.

== Career ==
Bryan was born in Kent, England, and moved with his family to Australia first and then to Wellington when he was a child, in the late 1960s. He completed a degree in Political Science and History at Victoria University of Wellington, before working in radio, including as a DJ for 2ZM in Wellington in the late 1970s and 1980s. He progressed into television in 1982, and became a sports presenter for TVNZ in 1987. Bryan, along with Keith Quinn and John McBeth were laid off by TVNZ 2007, before the company invited all three to compete for a single vacancy in Auckland. He was the successful applicant and is still employed by TVNZ.

Bryan reads news for MediaWorks New Zealand. He was a newsreader for Radio Live. He was previously a breakfast co-host on The Sound, Magic, and a news presenter for The Radio Network. He began with the IRN News Centre as breakfast newsreader, and then became part of the Newstalk ZB News team when IRN combined with the Newstalk ZB Newsroom. He was part of the Affiliates unit, which is based in the Auckland newsroom of Newstalk ZB, and produces bulletins for many commercial stations around the country, including other stations of The Radio Network. He remained a breakfast newsreader for the Affiliates unit until mid-2009, when his position was combined with another role, and he was made redundant. However, he remains working for MediaWorks New Zealand.

== Personal life ==
He is married with four young adult children and lives in Auckland. His sporting passions are cricket and football.

== See also ==
- List of New Zealand television personalities
