= Laura Tupou =

New Zealand news reader and television presenter

- Born: 1989 or 1990 (age 35–36); Hamilton, New Zealand
- Education: University of Waikato
- Occupation: Journalist

Laura Tupou (born 1989 or 1990) is a New Zealand news reader and television presenter who has worked for Newshub, ThreeNews and The Project.

== Early life and education ==
Tupou was born in Hamilton in 1989 or 1990 and grew up there. Tupou is part Tongan. She attended Hillcrest High School and has said that during this time she "always secretly wanted to be a journalist". At the University of Waikato, she received a Bachelor of Social Science, majoring in environmental planning. She initially started an engineering degree at another university due to her interest in mathematics but she changed her mind.

== Career ==
Tupou started working for the TV news programme Newshub in 2018. In June 2021 Tupou became one of the hosts of The Project while Kanoa Lloyd was on maternity leave. Tupou had previously hosted the show and had hosted in place of Lloyd. In August that year she temporarily became the sole host of the programme due to the COVID-19 pandemic.

After previously presenting Newshub with another person, in December 2022 she became the programme's only weekend presenter. In July 2024 Tupou was the presenter of the first broadcast of ThreeNews, which replaced Newshub. Tupou continued to be the programme's presenter on weekends. In early 2025 Tupou became a weather correspondent for Stuff and ThreeNews. Tupou left the position of the weekend ThreeNews news anchor, and was replaced by Imogen Wells.

== Personal life ==
As of June 2021 Tupou lives in West Auckland with her partner Andrew Patterson, who works at the University of Auckland Business School as an associate dean. They have two children as of July 2024.
