= Philip Sherry =

New Zealand broadcaster and politician (1933–2021)

Philip Sherry MNZM JP
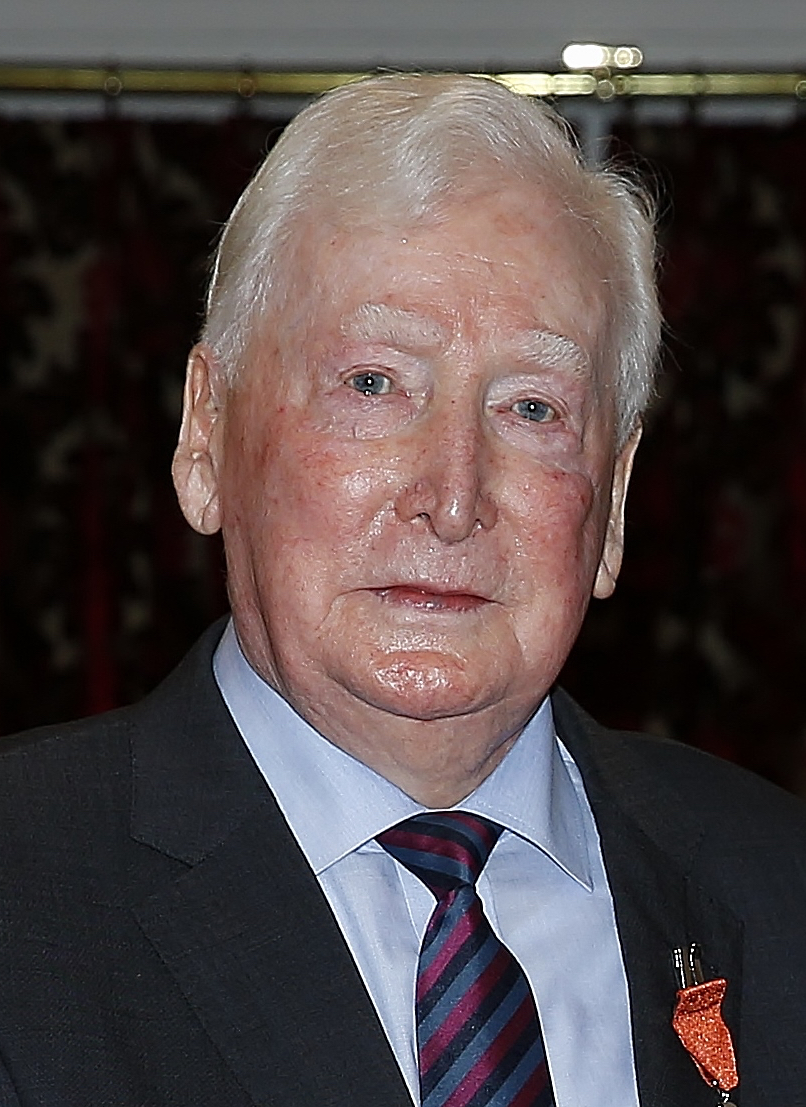
- Sherry in May 2018
- Born: Philip James Sherry; 13 October 1933; Wellington, New Zealand
- Died: 18 July 2021 (aged 87); Papamoa, Tauranga, New Zealand
- Occupations: Broadcaster; politician

Philip James Sherry MNZM JP (13 October 1933 – 18 July 2021) was a New Zealand broadcaster and local-body politician. He served as a newsreader for various radio and television stations between 1960 and 1990, including as one of three presenters selected to read the NZBC Network News when it began in November 1969 and presenting the first 3 National News bulletin on 27 November 1989. He later served as a local-body politician in Auckland and the Bay of Plenty.

== Biography ==
Sherry was born and raised in Wellington. He began presenting radio in 1960 on the local station 2YD. In 1962, with the introduction of television, the station became WNTV-1, and Sherry continued to read the Wellington news on screen. He then spent a period of time working overseas as a radio announcer in Vancouver, London (at the BBC), Hilversum (at the Dutch World Service) and Berne, and returned to New Zealand in 1967.

From 1967, Sherry worked on the nightly television news programme Town and Around. With the completion of the national television network, the New Zealand Broadcasting Corporation launched the Network News in November 1969 and Sherry was one of the team of three newsreaders, along with Dougal Stevenson and Bill Toft. In 1975, he returned to radio broadcasting on National Radio's Morning Report, while continuing with the evening television bulletins.

In 1976 Sherry began co-hosting TV2's late-night news and current affairs programme News at Ten with Tom Bradley; the show was cancelled in 1977 due to the planned amalgamation of the country's two networks. In 1978, he began presenting the new twice-a-week current affairs programme Eyewitness News, and in 1982 he returned to reading the Network News, now on TV One. In 1986, the Network News changed to a two-presenter format and Sherry moved back to radio, reading the morning news bulletin for Auckland's 1ZB. Around this time he also began presenting programmes for the Christian Broadcasting Association.

In 1989, Sherry joined new channel TV3 as the solo anchor for their main evening bulletin, 3 National News. The channel launched on Sunday 26 November 1989, with full programming, including the network's first news bulletin, starting the following day. His tenure only lasted seven months; he was replaced by Joanna Paul in June 1990.

In the early 1990s, Sherry retired from broadcasting and moved into politics. In 1992 he became a councillor for the North Shore City Council and Takapuna Community Board. He then represented North Shore for three terms on the Auckland Regional Council, and finished his tenure as deputy chairman. At the 1999 general election, Sherry ran for the Christian Heritage Party; he placed second on the party list, however the party failed to win any seats. In 2004, he moved to Tauranga and subsequently became a councillor for Environment Bay of Plenty.

Sherry's mother suffered from macular degeneration, and Sherry served as an ambassador for the national not-for-profit organisation Macular Degeneration New Zealand. In 2014, he fronted the organisation's public information campaign.

Sherry died at his home in Papamoa on 18 July 2021, aged 87, after a short illness. His death was announced at the Eucharistic Convention in Auckland on the same day; Sherry had served as MC for the convention for many years.

=== Recognition ===
In 1977, Sherry won the inaugural Bill Toft Memorial Trophy for Broadcaster of the Year. At the 2018 New Year Honours, Sherry was made a Member of the New Zealand Order of Merit for services to local government and broadcasting.

== Personal life ==
Sherry and his wife Margaret had seven children. One of his grandchildren, Baxter Sherry and Vinny Sherry, became a news journalist for TV Three's Newshub.
