= AM (TV programme) =

New Zealand TV morning news

- Genre: News; Entertainment
- Presented by: Lloyd Burr; Melissa Chan-Green; Nicky Styris; Michael O'Keefe; William Wairua
- Country of origin: New Zealand
- Original language: English

Production
- Executive producer: Reuben Bradley
- Production location: Auckland
- Running time: 3 hours (6 am – 9 am)
- Production companies: MediaWorks New Zealand (2017–2021); Warner Bros. Discovery New Zealand (2020–2024)

Original release
- Network: Three
- Release: 13 February 2017 – 5 July 2024

AM (formerly known as The AM Show) is a New Zealand morning news and talk show that aired from 6 am to 9 am on Three. The programme was last presented by Lloyd Burr, Melissa Chan-Green, Nicky Styris, Michael O'Keefe, and William Waiirua. Former presenters included Ryan Bridge, Bernadine Oliver-Kerby, Amanda Gillies, Mark Richardson and Aziz Al-Sa'afin. It was presented by Duncan Garner from 2017 until his resignation in August 2021. News and sport bulletins were provided by Newshub.

The show replaced Paul Henry after it was announced the frontman of the show was resigning and therefore the show was going to be replaced. The announcement was made by MediaWorks in November 2016, and Paul Henry last aired on 16 December 2016. The show's reporters were Sinelle Fernandez in Auckland, and Ashleigh McCaull in Wellington.

Before 2022, The AM Show was a hybrid radio and television programme which aired simultaneously on Three and Radio Live (rebranded as Magic Talk in 2019). The show was reformatted and ceased broadcasting on radio, following MediaWorks' decision to end its content supply agreement with Newshub in 2021.

== Other programmes ==
=== AM Early ===
AM Early was a 30-minute early morning bulletin that aired from 5:30 to 6 am on Three. The programme provided overnight news updates, as well as business and finance news. It was presented by Bernadine Oliver-Kerby.

The bulletin was discontinued on 16 August 2023, with the final bulletin airing on 25 August 2023.

== Presenters ==
=== Main ===
Tenure	Presenter
8 February 2022	Melissa Chan-Green
29 January 2024	Lloyd Burr
23 January 2023	Nicky Styris
23 January 2023	Michael O'Keefe

=== Former ===
Tenure	Presenter
6 September 2021 – 15 December 2023	Ryan Bridge
13 February 2017 – 23 August 2021	Duncan Garner
13 February 2017 – 10 December 2021	Amanda Gillies
13 February 2017 – 10 December 2021	Mark Richardson

=== News and sport ===
Tenure	Presenter
8 February 2022 – late 2022	Bernadine Oliver-Kerby

=== Social media ===
Tenure	Presenter
13 February 2017– 10 December 2021	Aziz Al-Sa'afin

=== Backup presenters ===
Role	Presenter
Presenter	Michael Morrah
Presenter	Connor Whitten
News and sport	Nicky Styris
Social media	Lana Adelene
