= Keith Quinn (broadcaster) =

NZ author & sports broadcaster (born 1946)

Keith Quinn MNZM
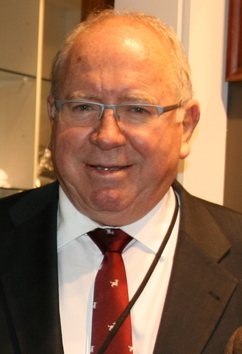
- Quinn in 2015
- Born: 1 September 1946 (age 80); Te Kūiti, New Zealand
- Occupations: Sports commentator, author

Keith Quinn MNZM (born 1 September 1946) is an author, and one of New Zealand's most experienced television sports commentators.

== Early life ==
Quinn was educated at Wellington College, leaving when he was 17 and after leaving school joined the state broadcaster the NZBC as a cadet in 1965. Quinn commentated his first game of rugby for radio at the last British Lions tour test in 1971, (the New Zealand v British Isles 4th test on 1ZB) and for television in 1973, a year after the NZ Rugby Football Union first allowed rugby games to be telecast live. His first test rugby call for TVNZ was New Zealand v England at Eden Park in 1973.

== Career ==
He has also covered ten Olympic and ten Commonwealth Games from Munich 1972 – Rio 2016, and has commentated on everything from swimming, boxing, athletics, tennis and table tennis.

In 1977 Quinn wrote the first of 16 books about sport, Lions '77. Quinn's other works include three editions of The Encyclopedia of World Rugby and a 2000 autobiography called Keith Quinn – A Lucky Man. In that book he rated presenting 1999 television show The Legends of the All Blacks as "one of the most enjoyable and stimulating experiences of my life". The programme explored the history of the New Zealand rugby team through interviews with past All Blacks, and some of the international teams and players who had played against them.

Among his other titles are Quinn's Quirks and Quinn's Quips which are both collections of sporting yarns and stories. In 2012, he wrote The A-Z of Meads which was his collection of the best stories about All Black great Sir Colin Meads. In late 2015 he released his 15th book, 'Quinn's Whims,' which contains more stories, yarns and facts, but mostly done with the eighth Rugby World Cup in mind. He attended the latter stages of the 2015 Rugby World Cup as an 'Ambassador' for Williment Sport Travel of Wellington. In 2020 he wrote "Give 'Em the Axe – 150 Years of the Wellington Football Club." He is a Life Member and former President of that club.

In the 1997 Queen's Birthday Honours, Quinn was appointed a Member of the New Zealand Order of Merit, for services to sports journalism. In 2002, he was awarded a SPARC Lifetime Aotearoa 'T.P' Award for his 'Outstanding Contribution to Sport through Journalism.' (So-named after Sir Terry 'T.P' McLean) In 2004, he was awarded the International Olympic Committee's 'Sport and Media' Award for services to reporting New Zealand teams at the Olympic Games. In 2010, he was awarded by the New Zealand Rugby Union the 'Steinlager Salver' for 'Outstanding Services to Rugby.' (Among other winners being Sir Wilson Whineray, Sir Brian Lochore, Sir Colin Meads and Sir John Graham). In 2016, he was presented with a 'Lifetime Contribution to Sport' award in his hometown of Wellington by Sport Wellington Ltd.

In July 2007, TVNZ announced Quinn would be made redundant from the state broadcaster, along with fellow sports broadcasters John McBeth and Geoff Bryan. At that stage he had completed 42 years continuous service with the State Broadcaster.

In 2011 Quinn was part of the studio and commentary team for Māori Television's coverage of the seventh Rugby World Cup, held in New Zealand.

From 1999 to 2018 Quinn was a regular free-lance commentator for the IRB Sevens World Series coverage and in 2018 he had passed 120 World Sevens tournament events which he has attended. He also had four years commentating for New Zealand's Sky TV Rugby Channel's their new Land Rover College Rugby coverage.

He attended the 2014 Youth Summer Olympic Games in Nanjing, China. There he says 'he was privileged' to commentate rugby's return (in its sevens format) to the Modern Olympic Games programme of events. He commentated rugby sevens at the Rio Olympics in August 2016. That was his tenth Summer Olympic Games.

He has also attended the Paralympics three times 2000–2008 (in Sydney, Athens and Beijing)

In 2014, he was flown by the airline Emirates to Dubai to speak at the Dubai 'Long Lunch' along with former England rugby star Matt Dawson. Apart from his regular appearances speaking in New Zealand he has spoken in South Africa (at the Wanderers Club in Johannesburg), in London (at The Rugby Club), in Sydney, in Hong Kong and in one of his most memorable places for the SCRUM Club (Supporters Club Rugby Union in Morobe) in Lae in Northern Papua New Guinea.

He is retired and lives in Wellington, New Zealand.

== See also ==
- List of New Zealand television personalities
