= Bernadine Oliver-Kerby =

New Zealand television presenter (born 1971)

Bernadine Oliver-Kerby (born 14 June 1971) is a New Zealand broadcaster who formerly co-hosted (until December 2019) the breakfast show alongside Jason Reeves on Coast. She has previously worked as a newsreader for both One News and Newstalk ZB.

== Broadcasting career ==
Previously she worked as a sports reporter and was the co-anchor of One News and a fill-in for other bulletins during the week, including One News at 6pm and Breakfast and late news. She co-anchored One News with Peter Williams. Between February and March 2006 she presented TV Two's New Zealand's Brainiest Kid. Oliver-Kerby also appeared in the TV One documentary, Intrepid Journeys. Her episode documented the lives of the people in Croatia.

She was announced in 2004 to replace Barry Holland as the Newsreader for the Paul Holmes Breakfast, later the Mike Hosking Breakfast. She first began this role in January 2005 and won Newsreader of the Year at the NZ Radio Awards that year. In October 2007, she went on maternity leave, leaving her job to Kate Hawkesby. Since her return she had been working part-time on this radio slot. In July 2009, she took maternity leave for her second child. From March 2010 she returned to the role full-time, before leaving in late 2018.

She hosted Skoda Game On and Skoda Game On Extra Time with Rod Cheeseman, a show talking, debating and joking sport.

She won Newsreader of the Year at the New Zealand Radio Awards 2016.

In 2020, she joined Sky Sport, and in January 2022 she started on The AM Show alongside Ryan Bridge, Melissa Chan-Green and William Waiirua.

== Personal life ==
In late 2022, she announced that she was suffering from Bell's palsy and took leave from AM, which was cancelled in mid-2024 when Newshub was closed down.

== See also ==
- List of New Zealand television personalities
