= Patrick Gower =

New Zealand journalist

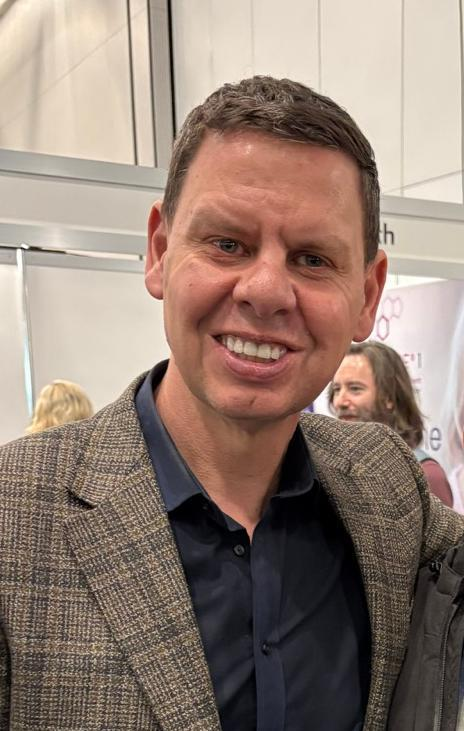
- Gower in 2026
- Born: Patrick James Gower; 1 April 1977 (age 49); New Plymouth, New Zealand
- Education: Francis Douglas Memorial College; Victoria University of Wellington
- Occupation: Political journalist
- Employer: Stuff
- Children: 2
- Website: Official Newshub profile

Patrick James Gower (born 1 April 1977) is a New Zealand journalist for Stuff. Prior to his current role he was political editor and then national correspondent for Newshub (formerly called 3 News).

== Early life ==
Gower grew up in New Plymouth where his father was a fitter and turner at a power station, and his mother was a doctor's receptionist. He had a Roman Catholic upbringing and schooling, having attended St Joseph's Catholic School and Francis Douglas Memorial College.

Gower graduated with a Bachelor of Arts (Honours) degree in politics from Victoria University of Wellington in 1999, having chosen that university because of its proximity to Parliament. While at Victoria, he was involved in Salient magazine. After finishing his politics degree, he studied journalism at Auckland University of Technology.

== Journalism career ==
Gower started his journalism career working the graveyard shift (6pm–1:30am) at The New Zealand Herald, later becoming one of the newspaper's two police reporters. He subsequently moved to the UK and worked at Jane's Police Review. Once back in New Zealand he worked again at the Herald, covering politics and working under Audrey Young.

Later he made a move to television journalism and began working at 3 News, where he was initially a political reporter. He has said that the transition involved a big change in reporting styles:

I always said that in print it's like working with a scalpel, because you can really get into the nitty-gritty, and you can be really specialised and direct. And you can work with complex issues really easily. In TV you've got to drop the scalpel, and they hand you an axe. It can be really effective to use, but it's nowhere near as delicate as working in print.

He took over as political editor of 3 News from Duncan Garner in November 2012.

Despite controversy about political bias on social networking sites, Gower claims to be a non-voter on the grounds of impartiality, stating:

People ask all the time do I vote, and I just don't, because I like to be independent as possible. I understand a lot of other journalists here can vote and personally I think that's fine. And being fair to both sides is important, and always giving a fair go to everyone and letting them have their say is absolutely crucial. Ultimately the best guard against bias is just by doing the best stories in the best way that you can. If you’re following the news then you never have to worry about being biased.

In 2018, after five years as Newshub's political editor, he shifted roles to become its national correspondent. He maintained this role until Newshub’s closure in 2024.

On 20 August 2024, Stuff announced the hiring of Gower for its news operations.

In mid 2024, Radio New Zealand hired Gower as an occasional host. Gower hosted the King's Birthday programming and filled in for Kathryn Ryan on RNZ National's Nine to Noon programme. Gower also co-hosted the summer edition of RNZ National's Morning Report for two weeks in January 2025.

In November 2026, RNZ National confirmed that Gower would host the channel's Saturday Morning show from Auckland in 2027 as a full-time host.

During the 2026 New Zealand Screen Awards, Gower won the "Best Presenter - News and Current Affairs" award for his Paddy Gower has Issues programme.

=== Viral skit ===
On 18 August 2014, Gower appeared in a skit by the University of Auckland Law School’s comedy revue, presenting a live report for 3 News in the campus’s library. In the skit, a library-goer stands up and says, "This is a fucking library!", to which Gower replies, "This is the fuckin' news." A remix of the video posted in December later went viral. He recreated the video in the same location as part of the announcement of his hiring by Stuff ten years later, with the profanity bleeped out.

=== Cannabis documentary ===
In 2019, Gower featured in a two part documentary series Patrick Gower: On Weed where he explored issues related to medicinal and recreational cannabis before the 2020 New Zealand cannabis referendum. The documentary, produced by Three and funded by NZ on Air, was filmed in New Zealand and the United States. A final third episode was released in September 2020, in advance of the referendum which had been delayed due to the COVID-19 pandemic.

=== They Are Us script ===
In July 2021, Gower broke the story on a leaked draft script of the controversial They Are Us movie, which was based on the Christchurch mosque shootings. The proposed script was criticised by members of the New Zealand Muslim community as well as several politicians including National Party leader Simon Bridges, ACT Party David Seymour, and Deputy Prime Minister Winston Peters for its depiction of graphic violence, exploitation of the tragedy for commercial gain, and historical inaccuracies of the events relating to the mosque shootings. Gower was emotionally affected by the script and called upon the film's director and writer Andrew Niccol to withdraw from the film production.

Later in the year, Gower presented a ThreeNow documentary on the shootings, Patrick Gower on Hate, which centred on the victims' viewpoints.

== Personal life ==
Gower lives in Wellington and has two children.

Gower struggled with alcoholism as revealed in his ThreeNow documentary Patrick Gower: On Booze. Since December 2021, he has been on a journey of sobriety.

== See also ==
- List of New Zealand television personalities
