= Barry Soper =

New Zealand journalist

Soper in 2026

Barry John Soper ONZM (born 1951 or 1952) is a New Zealand political journalist, and has been featured regularly on radio and television since the 1970s.

== Early life ==
Soper is from Gore. In 1969, after finishing high school he attended the Royal New Zealand Police College at Trentham for six months before he withdrew from studying. Soper returned to Gore, and started to work for The Southland Times.

== Career ==
After working at The Southland Times, Soper worked for a number of media organisations: Mataura Ensign, Otago Daily Times, New Zealand Truth, and the Waikato Times. Following this, he worked for the New Zealand Wool Board as a speech-writer. Soper joined the Parliamentary Press Gallery in 1980 working for APN, before moving to Newstalk ZB, where he currently works.

Soper covered both the 1987 Fijian coups d'état, and the 2000 Fijian coups d'état, securing the first international interview with George Speight.

He was approached to stand for the Labour Party at the 1992 Wellington Central by-election, but rejected the offer to do so.

Soper covered Nelson Mandela's inauguration in 1994. In 2001, Soper was named Individual Radio Journalist of the Year at the Radio Awards.

Soper himself made the news in July 2006 during the visit of Foreign Minister Winston Peters to Washington, DC, where Peters singled out Soper from a group of journalists who questioned Peters during the trip. Soper reported that Peters' own behaviour was outside what would reasonably be expected of a politician during an international visit.

Previously, he was also one of the "You've Got Male" panellists on TV One's Good Morning.

Currently, Soper's main role is political editor at Newstalk ZB, a radio network in New Zealand. Through its agreement with Prime Television, he appears as the political editor for the TV network on its nightly broadcasts.

In the 2026 King's Birthday Honours, Soper was appointed an Officer of the New Zealand Order of Merit, for services to journalism.

== Personal life ==
Soper married journalist Heather du Plessis-Allan in 2009. In October 2021 Du Plessis-Allan announced she was pregnant. The baby boy was born on 26 February 2022.

Soper has five children from his two previous marriages. His daughter Alice Soper is a rugby player, television analyst, and kids' television show host. On 28 July 2017, Soper's son Henry was stabbed during an argument at a bar in Courtenay Place. Months later, his younger son Hugh was severely injured after falling down a steep bank on a walking track near Karori. In 2021, Hugh was convicted of assault for a 2019 attack on two Wellington bar owners.

In 2010, Soper was fined and disqualified from driving for six months for drink-driving.

== See also ==
- List of New Zealand television personalities
