= Radio Live =

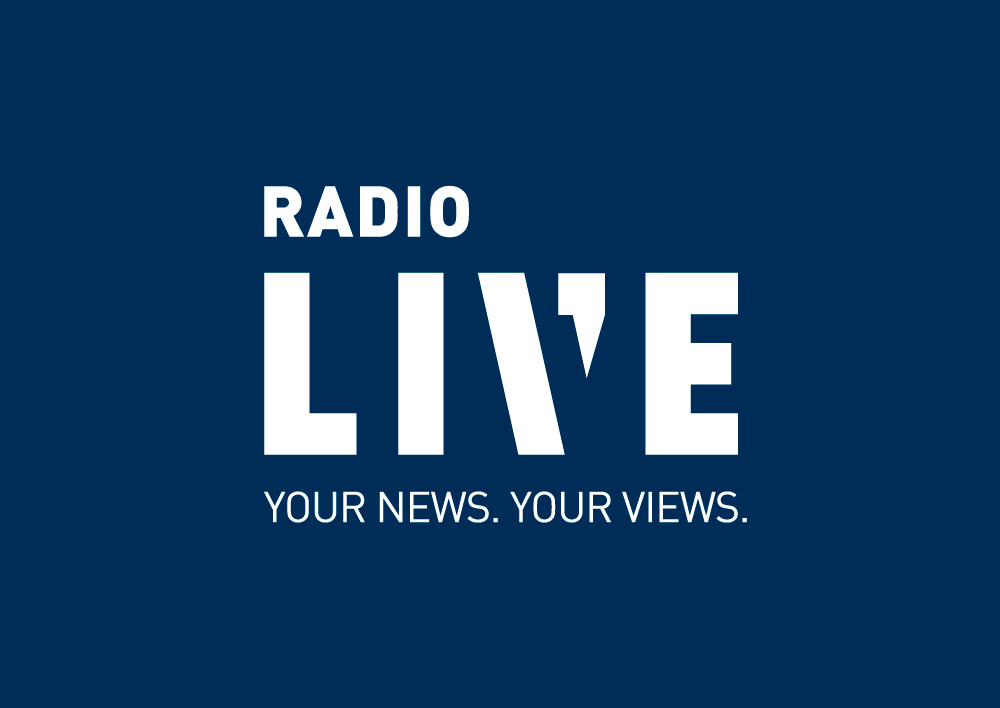

New Zealand
- Broadcast area: New Zealand

Programming
- Format: News/talk

Ownership
- Owner: MediaWorks New Zealand

History
- First air date: 11 April 2005
- Last air date: 18 January 2019

Links
- Website: radiolive.co.nz

Radio Live (stylised as Radio LIVE) was a nationwide Auckland-based New Zealand talkback, news and sport radio network owned and operated by MediaWorks New Zealand.

It was formed by the 2005 split of talk and racing network Radio Pacific into a dedicated talk network which prioritised breaking news coverage (Radio Live) and a talk network which broadcast live horse racing and greyhound racing commentaries which initially retained the Radio Pacific name before a rebrand to Bsport and finally LiveSport. The network competes directly against NZME. station Newstalk ZB.

In November 2018, it was announced that RadioLIVE would be merging with Mediaworks sister network, Magic, to form a talk-music radio hybrid known as Magic Talk, which started on 19 January 2019. Former TVNZ news presenter Peter Williams was the first host revealed for the new network.

== History ==
=== Radio Pacific ===
The network began as one, Auckland's Radio Pacific station, in 1978. Set up originally by talkback host Gordon Dryden, Radio Pacific became a New Zealand Stock Exchange listed company, with the Totalisator Agency Board as major shareholder. The company also bought a share of a group of North Island music stations known as Energy Enterprises and merged with the South Island radio company Radio Otago in 1999. The merged company, now known as Radioworks was purchased by a subsidiary of CanWest Global Communications which at that time owned the More FM radio network and TV3. CanWest later sold off the company as part of MediaWorks New Zealand.

During the 1990s, Pacific became one of the first commercial stations to be networked across the country. Although ownership of the network changed, live races and live betting odds continued to be broadcast on the network in pre-determined, limited periods during the race day under a contract with the New Zealand Racing Board. Between 2001 and 2005, this was complemented by a trial Radio Trackside station in the Southland market which simulcast Trackside TV and Radio Pacific as a dedicated racing station.

=== Relaunch ===
In April 2005, MediaWorks launched the Radio Live talkback network with newsreader Sarah Bradley and talk host Martin Devlin, making it the first New Zealand radio network to begin broadcasting nationwide on the same day. It launched the station, "the new voice of talk radio", as a sister network to Pacific, "more stimulating talk radio". The new network gained many of Radio Pacific's frequencies and presenters, including Michael Laws, Kerry Smith until 2006 and Paul Henry until 2007.

Live was a dedicated talkback network that could prioritise breaking news coverage, while Radio Pacific continued as a talkback and racing network on new frequencies. John Banks, Alice Worsley and Martin Crump remained behind on Radio Pacific to present morning talkback, while a Trackside TV simulcast, branded as Radio Trackside, was broadcast in the afternoon. On 29 October 2007, the station changed its morning format to sports radio and introduced new presenters. It was initially branded as "BSport, the station you can bet on" and it was rebranded again as LiveSport in January 2010.

On 31 January 2016, RadioLIVE news became Newshub. The first bulletin was presented by Leanne Malcolm. The last Newshub bulletin on RadioLIVE was at 11 pm 18 January 2019 and was presented by Brin Rudkin.

== Programmes ==
Magic Talk broadcasts news updates, breakfast and drive current affairs, open-line talkback, and weekend lifestyle content. News, sports and weather updates are broadcast live half-hourly during current affairs programmes and hourly at other times, through a partnership with MediaWorks's 24-hour Newshub service. Newshub Live at 6 was simulcast live every night until 19 January 2020.

=== Breakfast ===
From 5 am - 6 am, Rural Today is hosted by agricultural journalist Dominic George. The show focuses inside and outside the farm gate, featuring rural news, detailed weather reports and sport, while covering hot on-farm topics as well as some off-farm too. Rural Today is broadcast on Magic Talk and on Magic Music in Taranaki.

From 6 am - 9 am, The AM Show hosted by Duncan Garner, Amanda Gillies and Mark Richardson, with social media guru Aziz Al-Sa’afin. The AM Show is New Zealand's second groundbreaking multi-platform breakfast show, broadcasting simultaneously on Three and online; the first was Paul Henry, hosted by the broadcaster of the same name and ran from 2015–2016.

=== Daytime ===
From 9 am - midday Peter Williams hosts Magic Mornings, a three-hour show which invites its listeners to "discuss the news that affects you most. What's happening in NZ and around the world - you'll hear it first". Former morning hosts during the RadioLIVE era include Michael Laws, Sean Plunket and Mark Sainsbury.

Magic Afternoons was hosted by Sean Plunket from 12 pm - 4 pm (12 pm - 3 pm during 2019). This show allows listeners to call the free speech hotline for "no-holds barred common sense talk that you control". Former afternoon hosts during the RadioLIVE era include Willie Jackson, John Tamihere, Alison Mau and Wendyl Nissen.

=== Drive ===
Magic Drive (commonly known as The Ryan Bridge Drive Show) is hosted by Ryan Bridge from 4 pm - 7 pm (3 pm - 6 pm during 2019, followed by a live simulcast of Newshub Live at 6). With a mixture of current affairs and open-line talkback, this show sees its host, Ryan Bridge, driving the conversation home when listeners need it most, with unrivalled insight and the passion to share their truths.

Previous drive hosts during the RadioLIVE era have included Paul Henry in 2005, 2007 and 2011, James Coleman in 2006, Bill Ralston in 2008, Maggie Barry in 2009 and 2010, Brent Impey in 2011, Duncan Garner from 2011–2016, Alison Mau from 2017–2018, and Lisa Owen in 2018.

=== Early Evenings ===
A daily Newshub simulcast played from 6 pm nightly until 19 January 2020.

Monday–Thursday from 7–8 pm was InFocus, a deeper look at the day's top interviews and stories, hosted by former More FM newsreader Brin Rudkin. The final edition was broadcast in December 2018 during the RadioLIVE era.

On Friday evenings during the RadioLIVE era, the Outdoors Group Fishing Show ran from 7–8 pm.

=== Nights ===
Magic Nights is hosted by Leah Panapa from 7 pm - 11 pm. Time to discuss the day's events and have your say with what matters most to you.

Previous night hosts during the RadioLIVE era have included Marcus Lush, Karyn Hay, Andrew Fagan and Mitch Harris.

=== Overnights ===
Magic Overnights is hosted by Tony Amos from 10 pm - 3 am, Sunday to Thursday nights.

Tony Amos is the man for all you night owls out there, non-stop talkback to take you through the nights. Always on the other end of the telephone to take your calls and turn up the conversation.

Previous overnight hosts during the RadioLIVE era have included Ewing Stevens, Dave White, Dudley Stace, Bruce Hopkins, Emma Lange, Joe Reid and Hayden Rickard.

=== Weekends ===
Rural Exchange (commonly known as REX) is hosted by Richard "Loey" Loe and Hamish McKay. REX, which has been on air since August 2017, is a show dedicated to the backbone business of the nation, hosted by a couple of seasoned buggers. It broadcasts on Magic Talk (and on Magic Music in Taranaki) both Saturday and Sunday mornings from 6 am - 8 am. During the RadioLIVE era, REX ran from 5 am - 7 am and Sarah Perriam co-hosted the show until she left in early 2019 due to other commitments.

On Weekend mornings during the RadioLIVE era, Mucking In landscaper Tony Murrell hosted The Home and Garden Show. He was joined on Saturday by former New Zealand Woman's Weekly food editor Helen Jackson and Sundays by interior designer Hamish Dodd and Stan Scott for advice on DIY. By mid-2019, The Home and Garden Show was replaced by The DIY Experts with Hamish Dodd and Stan Scott providing DIY tips and advice in a two-hour, fast-paced, question and answer type format; it broadcasts Saturday mornings from 8 am - 10 am.

From 10 am - 1 pm on Saturdays is Weekend Life with Carly Flynn. It's your perfect accompaniment to your Saturday morning covering lifestyle, real estate, books, home styling and food & nutrition.

The Sunday Cafe broadcasts Sunday mornings from 8 am - 1 pm, hosted by Mel Homer. With a blend of guests, interviews and talkback, The Sunday Cafe is described as "a conversation at a cafe, covering off the Sunday papers in a laid back way". Previous Sunday hosts during the RadioLIVE era were Wallace Chapman, Mark Sainsbury, Ryan Bridge, Heather du Plessis-Allan and Trudi Nelson.

Saturday Sport hosted by Glen Larmer and, later, Brendan Telfer aired on Saturday from 2 pm - 6 pm, and included interviews with sports personalities and really getting to know our sports people. The final edition was broadcast in December 2018 during the RadioLIVE era.

Sunday Sport hosted by Andrew Gourdie and Jim Kayes aired on Sunday from 2 pm - 6 pm, and included interviews with sports personalities and unique perspective for our sporting mad country. The final edition was broadcast in December 2018 during the RadioLIVE era.

The Magic Talk Weekend Catch Ups fill the weekend afternoon schedule (after 1 pm) and feature clippings of the best segments from the previous week's shows. Occasionally, live talkback will replace the Magic Talk Weekend Catch Ups in the event of major news.

=== Weekend nights ===
Sunday Social with Vaughn Davis was broadcast on Sundays from 7 pm to 8 pm - the social media, app and internet show for the rest of us. It is a geek-free zone, where 'buzzwords' are forbidden and jargon is busted. The final edition was broadcast in December 2018 during the RadioLIVE era.

Weekend Variety Wireless aired both Saturdays and Sundays from 8 pm - midnight. The talk programme had been part of the station since its inception, and focused on music, conservation, world issues and science. Regular contributors included linguist Max Cryer, Stardome Observatory astronomer Grant Christie, Sceptic Siouxise Wiles and American John Dybvig.

Host Graeme Hill is a former Radio Sport and bFM announcer, Sports Cafe presenter and The Able Tasmans band member. His on-air name is a musical pseudonym, due to his 'embarrassment' performing under his real name. "For anyone with a curious bone in their body, tune into the most interesting radio show on the planet!"

The final edition of the Weekend Variety Wireless was broadcast in December 2018 during the RadioLIVE era.

=== Newshub News Bulletins ===
Award-winning news bulletins, presented live hourly, are produced by the Newshub Radio service. Network weekday newsreaders include Amanda Gillies (The AM Show), Mary-Jane Tomasi (Workdays), Geoff Bryan (Drive), and Richard Baddiley (Evenings/Overnights). Weekend and fill-in newsreaders include Trudi Nelson, Leanne Malcolm, Brin Rudkin, Karen McCarthy, Bridget Hastie, Kim Blair and Eric Young. Sports readers include John McNeil, Chris Forster, John Day and Bruce Rickard.

=== Magic Music ===
The Magic Music programme is being simulcast on the Magic Talk network from 11 pm - 6 am on Fridays and after 7 pm on weekends and public holidays.

The Saturday Night Jukebox is commercial free and run from 7 pm - midnight on Saturdays, while, on Sundays, Country Magic is hosted by Mark Leishman and simulcast on Magic Talk until Tony Amos takes over at 11 pm. The final hour of Country Magic plays exclusively on the Magic Music network.

Occasionally, live talkback will replace the Magic Music programme in the event of major news.

== Stations ==
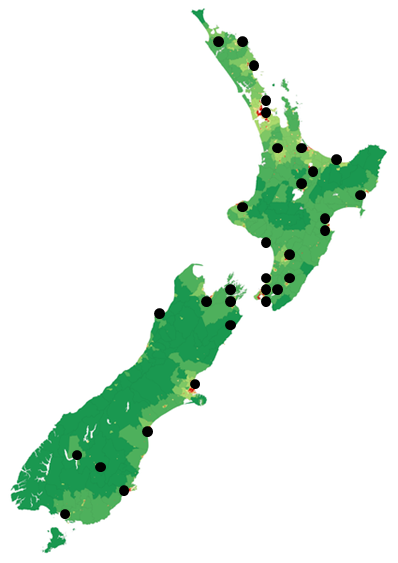
This is a map of the MediaWorks-owned frequencies for Radio Live.

=== Frequencies ===
These are the frequencies Magic Talk broadcasts on:

- Mid-Northland - 100.7 FM
- Whangārei - 90.8 FM
- Auckland - 702 AM
- Waikato - 100.2 FM
- Paeroa - 98.0 FM
- Tauranga - 100.6 FM
- Bay of Plenty - 1107 AM
- Bay of Plenty - 93.3 FM
- Whakatane - 92.1 FM
- Rotorua - 95.1 FM
- Gisborne - 94.9 FM
- Gisborne - 684 AM
- Hawke's Bay - 106.3 FM
- Hawke's Bay - 1368 AM
- Whanganui - 96.0 FM
- Manawatū - 93.8 FM
- Kapiti - 99.1 FM
- Upper Hutt - 98.9 FM
- Wairarapa - 98.3 FM
- Wellington - 98.9 FM
- Wellington - 1233 AM
- Blenheim - 95.3 FM
- Nelson - 96.0 FM
- Picton - 92.3 FM
- Westport - 90.1 FM
- Kaikōura - 89.1 FM
- Christchurch - 738 AM
- Timaru - 105.9 FM
- Mackenzie Country (Tekapo and Twizel) - 91.0 FM
- Oamaru - 100.8 FM
- Alexandra - 95.9 FM
- Queenstown - 91.2 FM
- Dunedin - 96.6 FM
- Southland - 94.0 FM
