= Story (TV programme) =

- Presented by: Duncan Garner Heather du Plessis-Allan
- Country of origin: New Zealand
- Original language: English
- No. of seasons: 2
- No. of episodes: 300+

Production
- Camera setup: Multi-camera
- Running time: 30 minutes (with commercials)

Original release
- Network: TV3
- Release: 10 August 2015 – 16 December 2016

Related
- Campbell Live; The Project

Story is a New Zealand current affairs television programme that aired on TV3 and was hosted by Duncan Garner and Heather du Plessis-Allan. It premiered on 10 August 2015, and aired 7–7:30 pm, Monday–Thursday. The final show aired on 16 December 2016. It was replaced by The Project in 2017.
