= Kanoa Lloyd =

New Zealand television and radio presenter

- Born: December 1986 (age 39); Gisborne, New Zealand
- Notable work: The Project

Comedy career
- Years active: 2009–present

Kanoa Lloyd (born December 1986) is a television and radio presenter from New Zealand. Lloyd was born in Gisborne to Ngāti Porou whānau, and grew up in Dunedin.

== Biography ==
In 2009, Lloyd joined the presenting team on after school show Sticky TV. From 2014 Lloyd was a weather presenter for 3 News at 6 pm, where she notably introduced some te reo Māori. In February 2017 Lloyd became one of the three inaugural presenters of 7 pm current affairs/entertainment show The Project. Lloyd also read the news on radio's Mai FM, from 2012 to 2014.
