= Heather du Plessis-Allan =

New Zealand journalist (born 1984)

- Born: 1984 (age 41–42); South Africa
- Education: University of Auckland (BA)
- Employer: Newstalk ZB
- Spouse: Barry Soper (m. 2009)

Heather du Plessis-Allan (born 1984) is a New Zealand journalist, television and radio broadcaster. She has worked for several broadcasters including TV3, Radio Live, TVNZ and Newstalk ZB.

== Early life and education ==
Heather du Plessis-Allan was born in South Africa in 1984. She migrated to New Zealand at the age of 12. Her mother Elizabeth is of Afrikaner descent while her father is of English descent and moved to New Zealand during his teenage years. Her parents separated when she was five years old. du-Plessis Allan's mother later remarried a New Zealand-born South African man, who fathered her two younger brothers.

While living in South Africa, du Plessis-Allan attended a semi-private high school that was adjusting to the end of Apartheid in 1994. After migrating to New Zealand, du Plessis-Allan and her family initially lived in Pukekohe before moving to Tuakau, Waikato. There, she studied at Tuakau College. During her final high school years in New Zealand, du-Plessis Allan's mother and stepfather divorced. She and her brothers opted to remain in New Zealand. Her mother Elizabeth became a real estate agent working for Barfoot & Thompson.

Du Plessis-Allan later studied political science at the University of Auckland. She credited her father for inspiring her interest in politics by giving her a copy of former ACT Party operative Simon Carr's The Dark Art of Politics.

== Journalism career ==
After graduating from University of Auckland, du-Plessis Allan briefly interned at TV3 before joining Radio Live as a broadcaster. She then worked as a broadcast journalist for TVNZ for ten years, including two years for TVNZ's current affairs programme Seven Sharp. In early 2015, du-Plessis Allan became a political journalist at TV3's current affairs Story programme. She also rejoined Radio Live.

In 2015, du-Plessis Allan produced a report on Story covering the ease of buying guns online in New Zealand. In response, her home was raided by the New Zealand Police. du-Plessis Allan had used false details to purchase a firearm online without holding a licence. Despite the police minister describing this as a "pretty serious offence", no charges were laid. The New Zealand Government also passed legislation amending the procedures for purchasing firearms. In 2017, du-Plessis Allan left her journalism job at TV3 following the cancellation of the Story programme. After participating in a New Zealand Herald interview covering the cancellation of Story, TV3's parent company MediaWorks New Zealand ordered her "off the air."

In 2017, du-Plessis Allan became a morning host at the New Zealand Media and Entertainment (NZME)-owned radio station Newstalk ZB. She subsequently became the host for their news and current affairs show Drive in 2019.

In September 2022, du-Plessis Allan was criticised by Rose Cook and School Strike 4 Climate organiser Mia Sutherland for allegedly bullying teenage School Strike 4 Climate organiser Izzy Cook during a live-interview. In late February 2023, the Broadcasting Standards Authority ruled that NZME was right to uphold a complaint against du-Plessis Allan's interview with Cook. NZME agreed that the interview breached fairness standards due to Cook's age and vulnerability. du Plessis-Allan and NZME apologised to Cook.

In early June 2025, du-Plessis Allan won the Broadcaster of the Year award at the 2025 NZ Radio and Podcast Awards.

== Personal life ==
Du Plessis-Allan has been married to New Zealand journalist Barry Soper since 2009. The couple live in Auckland. On 26 February 2022, she gave birth to a son. She is also a step-mother to Soper's five adult children.

Du Plessis-Allan is bilingual and speaks English and Afrikaans. She is fan of New Zealand writer Eleanor Catton's The Luminaries, whom she had interviewed.

== Views and positions ==
Du Plessis-Allan has advocated scrapping the National Certificate of Educational Achievement (NCEA) school certificate, citing concerns with academic quality and rigor.

In December 2024, du Plessis-Allan defended Prime Minister Christopher Luxon's decision not to attend the annual Waitangi Day events at Waitangi in February 2025.
