= The Project (New Zealand TV programme) =

New Zealand current affairs television program

- Genre: Current affairs, news, and entertainment
- Based on: The Project
- Presented by: Jesse Mulligan; Kanoa Lloyd; Jeremy Corbett
- Original language: English
- No. of series: 7
- No. of episodes: 1578

Production
- Executive producer: Jon Bridges
- Production location: Auckland
- Running time: 30 minutes (including advertisements)
- Production company: Discovery New Zealand

Original release
- Network: Three
- Release: 20 February 2017 – 1 December 2023

Related
- Story

The Project is a New Zealand current affairs show hosted by Jesse Mulligan, Kanoa Lloyd, and Jeremy Corbett with rotating guest panelists. It aired at 7 pm weeknights on Three.

The programme was officially cancelled on 26 October 2023, and its last episode aired on 1 December 2023.

== Format ==
The show's format was purchased from Roving Enterprises and was the same as that of the Australian version, The Project, which airs on Network Ten. It presented light and topical current affairs content as well as comedy from recent news stories. It was filmed and broadcast live in front of a studio audience.

Each presenter filled a different role on the programme: the anchor (Jesse Mulligan), the newsreader (Kanoa Lloyd) and the comedian (Jeremy Corbett). They were usually joined by a guest presenter who was typically a well-known New Zealander, such as a journalist, comedian or politician, or an international guest. Jaquie Brown filled that role regularly on Fridays. All the presenters introduced and voiced over magazine-style current affairs stories and discussed the day's events.

Episodes were thirty minutes, but were sixty minutes on Fridays from the show's 2017 launch until the end of 2019. The guest presenter and live audience were briefly discontinued during the COVID-19 pandemic.

== Presenters ==
Presenter	Role	Tenure
Jesse Mulligan	Anchor	20 February 2017 – 1 December 2023
Kanoa Lloyd	Newsreader	20 February 2017 – 1 December 2023
Jeremy Corbett	Comedian	19 March 2018 – 1 December 2023
Jaquie Brown	Guest presenter (Fridays)	24 March 2017 – 2023
Josh Thomson	Comedian	20 February 2017 – 16 March 2018

=== Backup presenters ===
- As anchor
  - Jon Bridges
  - Michael Wesley-Smith
  - Wallace Chapman
  - Patrick Gower
  - Ryan Bridge
  - Nadine Higgins
- As newsreader
  - Nadine Higgins (née Chalmers-Ross)
  - Mike McRoberts
  - Ali Mau
  - Isobel Ewing
  - Jeremy Corbett
  - Kate Rodger
  - Laura Tupou
- As comedian
  - Ben Hurley
  - Peter Helliar
  - Jeremy Elwood
  - Rhys Mathewson
  - Dai Henwood
  - Josh Thomson
  - Rose Matafeo
  - Melanie Bracewell
  - Urzila Carlson
  - Justine Smith
  - Rove McManus
  - Guy Williams
  - Heath Franklin (as Chopper)
  - Jono Pryor
  - Tony Lyall
  - Paul Ego
  - Jaquie Brown
  - Pax Assadi

== History ==
=== Season 1 (2017) ===
The first television advertisement for the show was released in early February and promoted the show as "not the same old song and dance". The program launched on 20 February 2017 with hosts Jesse Mulligan, Kanoa Lloyd, and Josh Thomson, and guest host Rove McManus, and became the number 1 trend on Twitter during its timeslot. Fill-in hosts throughout the first season include Ben Hurley, Peter Helliar, Jeremy Elwood, Rhys Mathewson, and Dai Henwood for Josh Thomson, Jon Bridges, Michael Wesley-Smith and Wallace Chapman for Jesse Mulligan, and Nadine Higgins (née Chalmers-Ross) for Kanoa Lloyd. On Monday through Thursday, episodes aired for half an hour, and on Friday, for a whole hour.

On 5 June 2017, RadioLive ceased simulcasting The Project.

The season ended on 15 December 2017, having aired 212 episodes.

=== Season 2 (2018) ===
The second season of The Project debuted on 15 January 2018, three weeks earlier than its competitor, Seven Sharp.

On 16 March 2018, Josh Thomson left his position as panelist on The Project, although he "will continue to contribute to The Project, and will join Jesse and Kanoa on the desk regularly." His position was filled by Jeremy Corbett, who had usually been the fourth host on Monday nights.

On 18 May 2018, Francesca Avent and Toby Gilsenan got married live on The Project, with Jaquie Brown officiating, as a culmination of the show's week-long celebration of the wedding of Prince Harry and Meghan Markle.

The season ended on 14 December 2018, having aired 238 episodes.

=== Season 3 (2019) ===
The third season of The Project debuted on 21 January 2019, with Prime Minister Jacinda Ardern's partner Clarke Gayford as the fourth host.

On 15 March, they had no fourth host or live studio audience as they covered the Christchurch mosque shootings.

On 17 April, there was no episode, because Three was airing the You Are Us/Aroha Nui concert live from Christchurch. There was also no episodes on 19 April or 22 April for Good Friday and Easter Monday.

The season ended on 13 December 2019, having aired 232 episodes.

=== Season 4 (2020) ===
The fourth season of The Project debuted on 20 January 2020. The Friday episodes were reduced to half an hour.

On 17 February, they aired at 6:30pm due to a network outage at Newshub, which forced Three to re-air the 4:30pm bulletin at 6pm, and meant that they didn't have an autocue.

Due to the COVID-19 pandemic, the show stopped having an audience from 16 March, and from 23 March, it stopped having a rotating guest panelist, changing to a three-host format. A physically distanced studio audience returned on 18 May. A full studio audience and rotating guest panelist returned on 8 June, with Patrick Gower being the first.

On 12 August, with Auckland returning to Alert Level 3, the show stopped having an audience and reverted to the three-host format. When Auckland returned to Alert Level "2.5" on 31 August, a fourth host returned and a physically distanced audience was added.

The season ended on 11 December 2020, having aired 233 episodes.

=== Season 5 (2021) ===
The fifth season of The Project debuted on 18 January 2021. The rotating guest panelist was removed from 15 to 17 February 2021 and again from 1 to 5 March 2021, while Auckland was in Alert Level 3.

On 27 May, Urzila Carlson was scheduled to be the guest host, but had to self-isolate before the episode began.

As of 30 June 2021, 116 episodes have been aired.

=== Ending ===
On 26 October 2023, Warner Bros. Discovery ANZ confirmed they had commenced discussions to discontinue The Project by December 2023, citing changes in audience behaviour. The final episode aired on 1 December 2023.

== Episodes ==
=== Season 1 ===
#	Guest host	Air date
1	Rove McManus	20 February 2017
2	Kylie Bax	21 February 2017
3	Patrick Gower	22 February 2017
4	Paul Henry	23 February 2017
5	Urzila Carlson	24 February 2017
6	Lucy Lawless	27 February 2017
7	Bill Ralston	28 February 2017
8	Petra Bagust	1 March 2017
9	Duncan Greive	2 March 2017
10	Jaquie Brown	3 March 2017
11	Jeremy Corbett	6 March 2017
12	Lizzie Marvelly	7 March 2017
13	Patrick Gower	8 March 2017
14	Mark Sainsbury	9 March 2017
15	Michelle Dickinson	10 March 2017
16	Louise Wallace	13 March 2017
17	Bill Ralston	14 March 2017
18	Jaquie Brown	15 March 2017
19	Mark Sainsbury	16 March 2017
20	Petra Bagust	17 March 2017
21	Jeremy Corbett	20 March 2017
22	Urzila Carlson	21 March 2017
23	Bill Ralston	22 March 2017
24	Louise Wallace	23 March 2017
25	Jaquie Brown	24 March 2017
26	Jeremy Corbett	27 March 2017
27	Lizzie Marvelly	28 March 2017
28	Petra Bagust	29 March 2017
29	Mark Sainsbury	30 March 2017
30	Jaquie Brown	31 March 2017
31	Jeremy Corbett	3 April 2017
32	Mark Richardson	4 April 2017
33	Jon Bridges	5 April 2017
34	Petra Bagust	6 April 2017
35	Jaquie Brown	7 April 2017
36	Jeremy Corbett	10 April 2017
37	Petra Bagust	11 April 2017
38	Bill Ralston	12 April 2017
39	Jaquie Brown	13 April 2017
40	Michelle Dickinson	18 April 2017
41	Louise Wallace	19 April 2017
42	Mark Sainsbury	20 April 2017
43	Jaquie Brown	21 April 2017
44	Jeremy Corbett	24 April 2017
45	Lizzie Marvelly	26 April 2017
46	Mark Richardson	27 April 2017
47	Jaquie Brown	28 April 2017
48	Jeremy Corbett	1 May 2017
49	Louise Wallace	2 May 2017
50	Petra Bagust	3 May 2017
51	Mark Sainsbury	4 May 2017
52	Jaquie Brown	5 May 2017
53	Dominic Bowden	8 May 2017
54	Jeremy Corbett	9 May 2017
55	Lizzie Marvelly	10 May 2017
56	Paula Bennett	11 May 2017
57	Jaquie Brown	12 May 2017
58	Jeremy Corbett	15 May 2017
59	Petra Bagust	16 May 2017
60	Mike Wesley-Smith	17 May 2017
61	Bill Ralston	18 May 2017
62	Jaquie Brown	19 May 2017
63	Jeremy Corbett	22 May 2017
64	Jacinda Ardern	23 May 2017
65	Mark Richardson	24 May 2017
66	Mark Sainsbury	25 May 2017
67	Jaquie Brown	26 May 2017
68	Jeremy Corbett	29 May 2017
69	Urzila Carlson	30 May 2017
70	Petra Bagust	31 May 2017
71	Bill Ralston	1 June 2017
72	Jaquie Brown	2 June 2017
73	Jeremy Corbett	5 June 2017
74	Mark Richardson	6 June 2017
75	Metiria Turei	7 June 2017
76	Mark Sainsbury	8 June 2017
77	Patrick Gower	9 June 2017
78	Jeremy Corbett	12 June 2017
79	Mark Richardson	13 June 2017
80	Ali Mau	14 June 2017
81	Bill Ralston	15 June 2017
82	Jaquie Brown	16 June 2017
83	Jeremy Corbett	19 June 2017
84	Mark Richardson	20 June 2017
85	Ali Mau	21 June 2017
86	Mark Sainsbury	22 June 2017
87	Jaquie Brown	23 June 2017
88	Jeremy Corbett	26 June 2017
89	Mark Richardson	27 June 2017
90	David Seymour	28 June 2017
91	Rhys Darby	29 June 2017
92	Jaquie Brown	30 June 2017
93	Jeremy Corbett	3 July 2017
94	Mark Richardson	4 July 2017
95	Jordan Williams	5 July 2017
96	Louise Wallace	6 July 2017
97	Jaquie Brown	7 July 2017
98	Petra Bagust	10 July 2017
99	Mark Richardson	11 July 2017
100	Peter Dunne	12 July 2017
101	Ali Mau	13 July 2017
102	Jaquie Brown	14 July 2017
103	Petra Bagust	17 July 2017
104	Mark Richardson	18 July 2017
105	Jordan Williams	19 July 2017
106	Mark Sainsbury	20 July 2017
107	Jaquie Brown	21 July 2017
108	Jeremy Corbett	24 July 2017
109	Mark Richardson	25 July 2017
110	Mikey Havoc	26 July 2017
111	Ali Mau	27 July 2017
112	Jaquie Brown	28 July 2017
113	Jeremy Corbett	31 July 2017
114	Mark Richardson	1 August 2017
115	Petra Bagust	2 August 2017
116	Lloyd Burr	3 August 2017
117	Jaquie Brown	4 August 2017
118	Jeremy Corbett	7 August 2017
119	Mary Lambie	8 August 2017
120	Mikey Havoc	9 August 2017
121	Mark Richardson	10 August 2017
122	Jaquie Brown	11 August 2017
123	Jeremy Corbett	14 August 2017
124	Petra Bagust	15 August 2017
125	Mark Richardson	16 August 2017
126	Steven Joyce	17 August 2017
127	Jaquie Brown	18 August 2017
128	Jeremy Corbett	21 August 2017
129	Marama Fox	22 August 2017
130	Mary Lambie	23 August 2017
131	Lloyd Burr	24 August 2017
132	Jaquie Brown	25 August 2017
133	Jeremy Corbett	28 August 2017
134	Petra Bagust	29 August 2017
135	Bill English	30 August 2017
136	Mark Richardson	31 August 2017
137	Jaquie Brown	1 September 2017
138	Jeremy Corbett	4 September 2017
139	Gerry Brownlee	5 September 2017
140	Mark Richardson	6 September 2017
141	Carmel Sepuloni	7 September 2017
142	Jaquie Brown	8 September 2017
143	Mark Sainsbury	11 September 2017
144	Jacinda Ardern	12 September 2017
145	Mark Richardson	13 September 2017
146	Ali Mau	14 September 2017
147	Mary Lambie	15 September 2017
148	Bill English	18 September 2017
149	Lisa Owen	19 September 2017
150	Winston Peters	20 September 2017
151	Mark Richardson	21 September 2017
152	Jaquie Brown	22 September 2017
153	Lisa Owen	25 September 2017
154	Jeremy Corbett	26 September 2017
155	Mark Richardson	27 September 2017
156	Mary Lambie	28 September 2017
157	Jaquie Brown	29 September 2017
158	Mark Sainsbury	2 October 2017
159	Scott Brown	3 October 2017
160	Louise Wallace	4 October 2017
161	Mikey Havoc	5 October 2017
162	Jaquie Brown	6 October 2017
163	Jeremy Corbett	9 October 2017
164	Lisa Owen	10 October 2017
165	Mark Richardson	11 October 2017
166	Mark Sainsbury	12 October 2017
167	Jaquie Brown	13 October 2017
168	Jeremy Corbett	16 October 2017
169	Peter Dunne	17 October 2017
170	Mary Lambie	18 October 2017
171	Marama Fox	19 October 2017
172	Jaquie Brown	20 October 2017
173	Petra Bagust	23 October 2017
174	Mark Richardson	24 October 2017
175	Mark Sainsbury	25 October 2017
176	Ali Mau	26 October 2017
177	Jaquie Brown	27 October 2017
178	Jeremy Corbett	30 October 2017
179	Louise Wallace	31 October 2017
180	Mikey Havoc	1 November 2017
181	Neil Finn	2 November 2017
182	Paul Ego	3 November 2017
183	Jeremy Corbett	6 November 2017
184	Mary Lambie	7 November 2017
185	Mark Richardson	8 November 2017
186	Ali Mau	9 November 2017
187	Tim Shadbolt	10 November 2017
188	Jeremy Corbett	13 November 2017
189	Mark Sainsbury	14 November 2017
190	Peter Dunne	15 November 2017
191	Mark Richardson	16 November 2017
192	Jaquie Brown	17 November 2017
193	Mary Lambie	20 November 2017
194	Mark Richardson	21 November 2017
195	Jay-Jay Harvey	22 November 2017
196	Ali Mau	23 November 2017
197	Jaquie Brown	24 November 2017
198	Jeremy Corbett	27 November 2017
199	Louise Wallace	28 November 2017
200	Petra Bagust	29 November 2017
201	Mikey Havoc	30 November 2017
202	Jaquie Brown	1 December 2017
203	Guy Williams	4 December 2017
204	Mary Lambie	5 December 2017
205	Mark Richardson	6 December 2017
206	Mark Sainsbury	7 December 2017
207	Jaquie Brown	8 December 2017
208	Jay-Jay Harvey	11 December 2017
209	Mike McRoberts	12 December 2017
210	Mikey Havoc	13 December 2017
211	Mark Richardson	14 December 2017
212	Jaquie Brown	15 December 2017

=== Season 2 ===
#	Guest host	Air date
1	Jacinda Ardern	15 January 2018
2	Louise Wallace	16 January 2018
3	Mark Richardson	17 January 2018
4	Ali Mau	18 January 2018
5	Jaquie Brown	19 January 2018
6	Mary Lambie	22 January 2018
7	Jay-Jay Harvey	23 January 2018
8	Mark Richardson	24 January 2018
9	Mikey Havoc	25 January 2018
10	Jaquie Brown	26 January 2018
11	Guy Williams	29 January 2018
12	Petra Bagust	30 January 2018
13	Mark Richardson	31 January 2018
14	Ali Mau	1 February 2018
15	Jaquie Brown	2 February 2018
16	Jeremy Corbett	5 February 2018
17	Marama Fox	6 February 2018
18	Mark Richardson	7 February 2018
19	Louise Wallace	8 February 2018
20	Jaquie Brown	9 February 2018
21	Jeremy Corbett	12 February 2018
22	Peter Dunne	13 February 2018
23	Mark Richardson	14 February 2018
24	Ali Mau	15 February 2018
25	Jaquie Brown	16 February 2018
26	Jeremy Corbett	19 February 2018
27	Mark Richardson	20 February 2018
28	Judy Bailey	21 February 2018
29	Patrick Gower	22 February 2018
30	Jaquie Brown	23 February 2018
31	Petra Bagust	26 February 2018
32	Lisa Owen	27 February 2018
33	Jay-Jay Harvey	28 February 2018
34	Ali Mau	1 March 2018
35	Jaquie Brown	2 March 2018
36	Jeremy Corbett	5 March 2018
37	Mary Lambie	6 March 2018
38	Guy Williams	7 March 2018
39	Mark Richardson	8 March 2018
40	Mikey Havoc	9 March 2018
41	Jeremy Corbett	12 March 2018
42	Louise Wallace	13 March 2018
43	Mark Richardson	14 March 2018
44	Ali Mau	15 March 2018
45	Paul Ego	16 March 2018
46	Mary Lambie	19 March 2018
47	Judy Bailey	20 March 2018
48	Mark Richardson	21 March 2018
49	Patrick Gower	22 March 2018
50	Jaquie Brown	23 March 2018
51	Jeremy Corbett	26 March 2018
52	Suzy Cato	27 March 2018
53	Mark Richardson	28 March 2018
54	Ali Mau	29 March 2018
55	Mary Lambie	3 April 2018
56	Mark Richardson	4 April 2018
57	Louise Wallace	5 April 2018
58	Jaquie Brown	6 April 2018
59	Ali Mau	9 April 2018
60	Jay-Jay Feeney	10 April 2018
61	Samantha Hayes	11 April 2018
62	Mark Richardson	12 April 2018
63	Jaquie Brown	13 April 2018
64	King Kapisi	16 April 2018
65	Patrick Gower	17 April 2018
66	Mark Richardson	18 April 2018
67	Guy Williams	19 April 2018
68	Jaquie Brown	20 April 2018
69	Stan Walker	23 April 2018
70	Mark Richardson	24 April 2018
71	Arj Barker	25 April 2018
72	Ali Mau	26 April 2018
73	Jaquie Brown	27 April 2018
74	Urzila Carlson	30 April 2018
75	Mary Lambie	1 May 2018
76	Mark Richardson	2 May 2018
77	Ginette McDonald	3 May 2018
78	Patrick Gower	4 May 2018
79	King Kapisi	7 May 2018
80	Peter Dunne	8 May 2018
81	Mark Richardson	9 May 2018
82	Ali Mau	10 May 2018
83	Jaquie Brown	11 May 2018
84	Mikey Havoc	14 May 2018
85	Guy Williams	15 May 2018
86	Mark Richardson	16 May 2018
87	Patrick Gower	17 May 2018
88	Jaquie Brown	18 May 2018
89	Lance O'Sullivan	21 May 2018
90	Paul Ego	22 May 2018
91	Mark Richardson	23 May 2018
92	Patrick Gower	24 May 2018
93	Jaquie Brown	25 May 2018
94	Stan Walker	28 May 2018
95	Mary Lambie	29 May 2018
96	Ali Mau	30 May 2018
97	Mark Richardson	31 May 2018
98	Jaquie Brown	1 June 2018
99	Mark Richardson	4 June 2018
100	Ali Mau	5 June 2018
101	Wendyl Nissen	6 June 2018
102	Guy Williams	7 June 2018
103	Mikey Havoc	8 June 2018
104	Mark Richardson	11 June 2018
105	Robbie Rakete	12 June 2018
106	Patrick Gower	13 June 2018
107	Ginette McDonald	14 June 2018
108	Jaquie Brown	15 June 2018
109	Mark Richardson	18 June 2018
110	Kim Crossman	19 June 2018
111	Steve Wrigley	20 June 2018
112	Ali Mau	21 June 2018
113	Jaquie Brown	22 June 2018
114	Mark Richardson	25 June 2018
115	Mikey Havoc	26 June 2018
116	Michèle A'Court	27 June 2018
117	Mary Lambie	28 June 2018
118	Patrick Gower	29 June 2018
119	Wendyl Nissen	2 July 2018
120	Guy Williams	3 July 2018
121	Jackie Clarke	4 July 2018
122	Ali Mau	5 July 2018
123	Jaquie Brown	6 July 2018
124	Robbie Rakete	9 July 2018
125	Te Radar	10 July 2018
126	Ginette McDonald	11 July 2018
127	Simon Bridges	12 July 2018
128	Jaquie Brown	13 July 2018
129	Mark Richardson	16 July 2018
130	Ali Mau	17 July 2018
131	Bryce Casey	18 July 2018
132	Mary Lambie	19 July 2018
133	Jaquie Brown	20 July 2018
134	Mark Richardson	23 July 2018
135	Justine Smith	24 July 2018
136	Pene Pati	25 July 2018
137	Patrick Gower	26 July 2018
138	Winston Peters	27 July 2018
139	Guy Williams	30 July 2018
140	Mark Richardson	31 July 2018
141	Mikey Havoc	1 August 2018
142	Cal Wilson	2 August 2018
143	Jaquie Brown	3 August 2018
144	Patrick Gower	6 August 2018
145	Ali Mau	7 August 2018
146	Justine Smith	8 August 2018
147	Mark Richardson	9 August 2018
148	Jaquie Brown	10 August 2018
149	Wendyl Nissen	13 August 2018
150	Mark Richardson	14 August 2018
151	Michèle A'Court	15 August 2018
152	Mikey Havoc	16 August 2018
153	Stan Walker	17 August 2018
154	Patrick Gower	20 August 2018
155	Jackie Clarke	21 August 2018
156	Ginette McDonald	22 August 2018
157	Mark Richardson	23 August 2018
158	Paul Ego	24 August 2018
159	Patrick Gower	27 August 2018
160	Guy Williams	28 August 2018
161	Bryce Casey	29 August 2018
162	Mark Richardson	30 August 2018
163	Jaquie Brown	31 August 2018
164	Tim Minchin	3 September 2018
165	Mikey Havoc	4 September 2018
166	Kim Crossman	5 September 2018
167	Mark Richardson	6 September 2018
168	Jaquie Brown	7 September 2018
169	Patrick Gower	10 September 2018
170	Te Radar	11 September 2018
171	Cal Wilson	12 September 2018
172	Mark Richardson	13 September 2018
173	Jaquie Brown	14 September 2018
174	Patrick Gower	17 September 2018
175	Ali Mau	18 September 2018
176	Urzila Carlson	19 September 2018
177	Mark Richardson	20 September 2018
178	Jaquie Brown	21 September 2018
179	Patrick Gower	24 September 2018
180	Bryce Casey	25 September 2018
181	Michèle A'Court	26 September 2018
182	Mark Richardson	27 September 2018
183	Jaquie Brown	28 September 2018
184	Patrick Gower	1 October 2018
185	Mikey Havoc	2 October 2018
186	Antonia Prebble	3 October 2018
187	Rhys Darby	4 October 2018
188	Jaquie Brown	5 October 2018
189	Pam Corkery	8 October 2018
190	Michèle A'Court	9 October 2018
191	Mihingarangi Forbes	10 October 2018
192	Stan Walker	11 October 2018
193	Jaquie Brown	12 October 2018
194	Patrick Gower	15 October 2018
195	Mikey Havoc	16 October 2018
196	Ali Mau	17 October 2018
197	Mark Richardson	18 October 2018
198	Paul Ego	19 October 2018
199	Patrick Gower	22 October 2018
200	Michèle A'Court	23 October 2018
201	Mark Richardson	24 October 2018
202	Guy Williams	25 October 2018
203	Jaquie Brown	26 October 2018
204	Patrick Gower	29 October 2018
205	Ali Mau	30 October 2018
206	Mikey Havoc	31 October 2018
207	Mark Richardson	1 November 2018
208	Jaquie Brown	2 November 2018
209	Madeleine Sami	5 November 2018
210	Patrick Gower	6 November 2018
211	Cal Wilson	7 November 2018
212	Mark Richardson	8 November 2018
213	Jaquie Brown	9 November 2018
214	Patrick Gower	12 November 2018
215	Stan Walker	13 November 2018
216	Mikey Havoc	14 November 2018
217	Kings	15 November 2018
218	Jaquie Brown	16 November 2018
219	Mark Richardson	19 November 2018
220	Guy Williams	20 November 2018
221	Ali Mau	21 November 2018
222	Scott Brown	22 November 2018
223	Jaquie Brown	23 November 2018
224	Patrick Gower	26 November 2018
225	Catherine Tate	27 November 2018
226	Justine Smith	28 November 2018
227	Mark Richardson	29 November 2018
228	Jaquie Brown	30 November 2018
229	Patrick Gower	3 December 2018
230	Ali Mau	4 December 2018
231	Karyn Hay	5 December 2018
232	Mark Richardson	6 December 2018
233	Jaquie Brown	7 December 2018
234	Mikey Havoc	10 December 2018
235	Ali Mau	11 December 2018
236	Mark Richardson	12 December 2018
237	Antonia Prebble	13 December 2018
238	Jaquie Brown	14 December 2018

=== Season 3 ===
#	Guest host	Air date
1	Clarke Gayford	21 January 2019
2	Kim Crossman	22 January 2019
3	Kings	23 January 2019
4	Mark Richardson	24 January 2019
5	Jaquie Brown	25 January 2019
6	Michèle A'Court	28 January 2019
7	Cal Wilson	29 January 2019
8	Mark Richardson	30 January 2019
9	Guy Williams	31 January 2019
10	Jaquie Brown	1 February 2019
11	Patrick Gower	4 February 2019
12	Antonia Prebble	5 February 2019
13	Stacey Morrison	6 February 2019
14	Mark Richardson	7 February 2019
15	Jaquie Brown	8 February 2019
16	Patrick Gower	11 February 2019
17	Bryce Casey	12 February 2019
18	Mikey Havoc	13 February 2019
19	Mark Richardson	14 February 2019
20	Jaquie Brown	15 February 2019
21	Patrick Gower	18 February 2019
22	Pene Pati	19 February 2019
23	Justine Smith	20 February 2019
24	Mark Richardson	21 February 2019
25	Guy Williams	22 February 2019
26	Patrick Gower	25 February 2019
27	Ali Mau	26 February 2019
28	Mark Richardson	27 February 2019
29	Mikey Havoc	28 February 2019
30	Urzila Carlson	1 March 2019
31	Patrick Gower	4 March 2019
32	Guy Williams	5 March 2019
33	Mark Richardson	6 March 2019
34	Bryce Casey	7 March 2019
35	Jaquie Brown	8 March 2019
36	Patrick Gower	11 March 2019
37	Justine Smith	12 March 2019
38	Michèle A'Court	13 March 2019
39	Mark Richardson	14 March 2019
40	—N/a	15 March 2019
41	Patrick Gower	18 March 2019
42	Bob Parker	19 March 2019
43	Mihingarangi Forbes	20 March 2019
44	Mark Richardson	21 March 2019
45	Fatumata Bah	22 March 2019
46	Guy Williams	25 March 2019
47	Justine Smith	26 March 2019
48	Mikey Havoc	27 March 2019
49	Mark Richardson	28 March 2019
50	Jaquie Brown	29 March 2019
51	Patrick Gower	1 April 2019
52	Jaquie Brown	2 April 2019
53	Michèle A'Court	3 April 2019
54	Mark Richardson	4 April 2019
55	Clarke Gayford	5 April 2019
56	Patrick Gower	8 April 2019
57	Bryce Casey	9 April 2019
58	Guy Williams	10 April 2019
59	Mark Richardson	11 April 2019
60	Jaquie Brown	12 April 2019
61	Patrick Gower	15 April 2019
62	Mark Richardson	16 April 2019
63	Laura Daniel	18 April 2019
64	Guy Williams	23 April 2019
65	Peter Williams	24 April 2019
66	Mark Richardson	25 April 2019
67	Jaquie Brown	26 April 2019
68	Patrick Gower	29 April 2019
69	Urzila Carlson	30 April 2019
70	Michèle A'Court	1 May 2019
71	Mark Richardson	2 May 2019
72	Jaquie Brown	3 May 2019
73	Patrick Gower	6 May 2019
74	Siobhan Marshall	7 May 2019
75	Dom Harvey	8 May 2019
76	Mark Richardson	9 May 2019
77	Jaquie Brown	10 May 2019
78	Patrick Gower	13 May 2019
79	Mikey Havoc	14 May 2019
80	Bryce Casey	15 May 2019
81	Mark Richardson	16 May 2019
82	Jaquie Brown	17 May 2019
83	Michèle A'Court	20 May 2019
84	Patrick Gower	21 May 2019
85	Kim Crossman	22 May 2019
86	Mark Richardson	23 May 2019
87	Justine Smith	24 May 2019
88	Patrick Gower	27 May 2019
89	Antonia Prebble	28 May 2019
90	Ryan Bridge	29 May 2019
91	Mark Richardson	30 May 2019
92	Jaquie Brown	31 May 2019
93	Patrick Gower	3 June 2019
94	Julz Tocker	4 June 2019
95	Michèle A'Court	5 June 2019
96	Mark Richardson	6 June 2019
97	Justine Smith	7 June 2019
98	Patrick Gower	10 June 2019
99	Urzila Carlson	11 June 2019
100	Jono Pryor	12 June 2019
101	Mark Richardson	13 June 2019
102	Jaquie Brown	14 June 2019
103	Michèle A'Court	17 June 2019
104	Antonia Prebble	18 June 2019
105	Pax Assadi	19 June 2019
106	Mark Richardson	20 June 2019
107	Jaquie Brown	21 June 2019
108	Patrick Gower	24 June 2019
109	Justine Smith	25 June 2019
110	Julz Tocker	26 June 2019
111	Mark Richardson	27 June 2019
112	Jaquie Brown	28 June 2019
113	Patrick Gower	1 July 2019
114	Laura Daniel	2 July 2019
115	Bryce Casey	3 July 2019
116	Mark Richardson	4 July 2019
117	Jaquie Brown	5 July 2019
118	Justine Smith	8 July 2019
119	Pax Assadi	9 July 2019
120	Patrick Gower	10 July 2019
121	Mark Richardson	11 July 2019
122	Jaquie Brown	12 July 2019
123	Patrick Gower	15 July 2019
124	Ryan Bridge	16 July 2019
125	Kim Crossman	17 July 2019
126	Mark Richardson	18 July 2019
127	Jaquie Brown	19 July 2019
128	Patrick Gower	22 July 2019
129	Michèle A'Court	23 July 2019
130	Peter Williams	24 July 2019
131	Mark Richardson	25 July 2019
132	Jaquie Brown	26 July 2019
133	Pax Assadi	29 July 2019
134	Carol Hirschfeld	30 July 2019
135	Michèle A'Court	31 July 2019
136	Mark Richardson	1 August 2019
137	Jaquie Brown	2 August 2019
138	Patrick Gower	5 August 2019
139	Bryce Casey	6 August 2019
140	Justine Smith	7 August 2019
141	Mark Richardson	8 August 2019
142	Jaquie Brown	9 August 2019
143	Rhys Darby	12 August 2019
144	Patrick Gower	13 August 2019
145	Peter Williams	14 August 2019
146	Mark Richardson	15 August 2019
147	Jaquie Brown	16 August 2019
148	Patrick Gower	19 August 2019
149	Mark Richardson	20 August 2019
150	Kim Crossman	21 August 2019
151	Guy Williams	22 August 2019
152	Jaquie Brown	23 August 2019
153	Patrick Gower	26 August 2019
154	Ryan Bridge	27 August 2019
155	Pax Assadi	28 August 2019
156	Mark Richardson	29 August 2019
157	Jaquie Brown	30 August 2019
158	Patrick Gower	2 September 2019
159	Helen Clark	3 September 2019
160	Bryce Casey	4 September 2019
161	Jaquie Brown	5 September 2019
162	Ronnie Taulafo	6 September 2019
163	Patrick Gower	9 September 2019
164	Jaquie Brown	10 September 2019
165	Laura Daniel	11 September 2019
166	Mark Richardson	12 September 2019
167	Mikey Havoc	13 September 2019
168	Justine Smith	16 September 2019
169	Carol Hirschfeld	17 September 2019
170	Mark Richardson	18 September 2019
171	James Shaw	19 September 2019
172	Jaquie Brown	20 September 2019
173	Jimmy Barnes	23 September 2019
174	Mark Richardson	24 September 2019
175	Michèle A'Court	25 September 2019
176	Simon Bridges	26 September 2019
177	Jaquie Brown	27 September 2019
178	Bryce Casey	30 September 2019
179	Magda Szubanski	1 October 2019
180	David Seymour	2 October 2019
181	Meg Annear	3 October 2019
182	Jaquie Brown	4 October 2019
183	Patrick Gower	7 October 2019
184	Justine Smith	8 October 2019
185	Guy Williams	9 October 2019
186	Jason Gunn	10 October 2019
187	Winston Peters	11 October 2019
188	Patrick Gower	14 October 2019
189	Nadia Lim	15 October 2019
190	Kim Crossman	16 October 2019
191	Mark Richardson	17 October 2019
192	Jaquie Brown	18 October 2019
193	Ofisa Tonu'u	21 October 2019
194	Jaquie Brown	22 October 2019
195	Steve Wrigley	23 October 2019
196	Mark Richardson	24 October 2019
197	Pax Assadi	25 October 2019
198	Buck Shelford	28 October 2019
199	Carol Hirschfeld	29 October 2019
200	Michèle A'Court	30 October 2019
201	Mark Richardson	31 October 2019
202	Jaquie Brown	1 November 2019
203	Patrick Gower	4 November 2019
204	Guy Williams	5 November 2019
205	Laura Daniel	6 November 2019
206	Mark Richardson	7 November 2019
207	Jaquie Brown	8 November 2019
208	Patrick Gower	11 November 2019
209	Jason Gunn	12 November 2019
210	Pax Assadi	13 November 2019
211	Mark Richardson	14 November 2019
212	Jaquie Brown	15 November 2019
213	Patrick Gower	18 November 2019
214	Antonia Prebble	19 November 2019
215	Bryce Casey	20 November 2019
216	Chris Parker	21 November 2019
217	Jaquie Brown	22 November 2019
218	Patrick Gower	25 November 2019
219	John Hawkesby	26 November 2019
220	Israel Adesanya	27 November 2019
221	Mark Richardson	28 November 2019
222	Jaquie Brown	29 November 2019
223	Justine Smith	2 December 2019
224	Michèle A'Court	3 December 2019
225	Antonia Prebble	4 December 2019
226	Mark Richardson	5 December 2019
227	Jaquie Brown	6 December 2019
228	Patrick Gower	9 December 2019
229	Pax Assadi	10 December 2019
230	Mark Richardson	11 December 2019
231	Kim Crossman	12 December 2019
232	Jaquie Brown	13 December 2019

=== Season 4 ===
#	Guest host	Air date
1	Guy Williams	20 January 2020
2	Pax Assadi	21 January 2020
3	Michèle A'Court	22 January 2020
4	Mark Richardson	23 January 2020
5	Justine Smith	24 January 2020
6	Patrick Gower	27 January 2020
7	Antonia Prebble	28 January 2020
8	Kim Crossman	29 January 2020
9	Mark Richardson	30 January 2020
10	Justine Smith	31 January 2020
11	Patrick Gower	3 February 2020
12	Kara Rickard	4 February 2020
13	Jason Gunn	5 February 2020
14	Mark Richardson	6 February 2020
15	Justine Smith	7 February 2020
16	Patrick Gower	10 February 2020
17	Guy Williams	11 February 2020
18	Antonia Prebble	12 February 2020
19	Mike Richardson	13 February 2020
20	Pax Assadi	14 February 2020
21	Patrick Gower	17 February 2020
22	Michèle A'Court	18 February 2020
23	Mike Richardson	19 February 2020
24	Judy Bailey	20 February 2020
25	Justine Smith	21 February 2020
26	Patrick Gower	24 February 2020
27	Paul Ego	25 February 2020
28	Kara Rickard	26 February 2020
29	Mark Richardson	27 February 2020
30	Justine Smith	28 February 2020
31	Amanda Gillies	2 March 2020
32	Bryce Casey	3 March 2020
33	Nadine Higgins	4 March 2020
34	Pax Assadi	5 March 2020
35	Clarke Gayford	6 March 2020
36	Guy Williams	9 March 2020
37	Michèle A'Court	10 March 2020
38	Angus Ta'avao	11 March 2020
39	Mark Richardson	12 March 2020
40	Fatumata Bah	13 March 2020
41	Patrick Gower	16 March 2020
42	Kara Rickard	17 March 2020
43	Kate Rodger	18 March 2020
44	Mark Richardson	19 March 2020
45	Jaquie Brown	20 March 2020
46	—N/a	23 March 2020
47	—N/a	24 March 2020
48	—N/a	25 March 2020
49	—N/a	26 March 2020
50	—N/a	27 March 2020
51	—N/a	30 March 2020
52	—N/a	31 March 2020
53	—N/a	1 April 2020
54	—N/a	2 April 2020
55	—N/a	3 April 2020
56	—N/a	6 April 2020
57	—N/a	7 April 2020
58	—N/a	8 April 2020
59	—N/a	9 April 2020
60	—N/a	14 April 2020
61	—N/a	15 April 2020
62	—N/a	16 April 2020
63	—N/a	17 April 2020
64	—N/a	20 April 2020
65	—N/a	21 April 2020
66	—N/a	22 April 2020
67	—N/a	23 April 2020
68	—N/a	24 April 2020
69	—N/a	27 April 2020
70	—N/a	28 April 2020
71	—N/a	29 April 2020
72	—N/a	30 April 2020
73	—N/a	1 May 2020
74	—N/a	4 May 2020
75	—N/a	5 May 2020
76	—N/a	6 May 2020
77	—N/a	7 May 2020
78	—N/a	8 May 2020
79	—N/a	11 May 2020
80	—N/a	12 May 2020
81	—N/a	13 May 2020
82	—N/a	14 May 2020
83	—N/a	15 May 2020
84	—N/a	18 May 2020
85	—N/a	19 May 2020
86	—N/a	20 May 2020
87	—N/a	21 May 2020
88	—N/a	22 May 2020
89	—N/a	25 May 2020
90	—N/a	26 May 2020
91	—N/a	27 May 2020
92	—N/a	28 May 2020
93	—N/a	29 May 2020
94	—N/a	1 June 2020
95	—N/a	2 June 2020
96	—N/a	3 June 2020
97	—N/a	4 June 2020
98	—N/a	5 June 2020
99	Patrick Gower	8 June 2020
100	Justine Smith	9 June 2020
101	Pax Assadi	10 June 2020
102	Jason Gunn	11 June 2020
103	Jaquie Brown	12 June 2020
104	Patrick Gower	15 June 2020
105	Ben Hurley	16 June 2020
106	Tom Sainsbury	17 June 2020
107	Mark Richardson	18 June 2020
108	Jaquie Brown	19 June 2020
109	Patrick Gower	22 June 2020
110	Madeleine Sami	23 June 2020
111	Urzila Carlson	24 June 2020
112	Mark Richardson	25 June 2020
113	Jaquie Brown	26 June 2020
114	Patrick Gower	29 June 2020
115	Pax Assadi	30 June 2020
116	Justine Smith	1 July 2020
117	Mark Richardson	2 July 2020
118	Jaquie Brown	3 July 2020
119	Patrick Gower	6 July 2020
120	Ben Hurley	7 July 2020
121	Mark Richardson	8 July 2020
122	Urzila Carlson	9 July 2020
123	Jaquie Brown	10 July 2020
124	Paul Ego	13 July 2020
125	Michèle A'Court	14 July 2020
126	Justine Smith	15 July 2020
127	Mark Richardson	16 July 2020
128	Jaquie Brown	17 July 2020
129	Patrick Gower	20 July 2020
130	Pax Assadi	21 July 2020
131	Jason Gunn	22 July 2020
132	Stan Walker	23 July 2020
133	Jaquie Brown	24 July 2020
134	Patrick Gower	27 July 2020
135	Ben Hurley	28 July 2020
136	Kim Crossman	29 July 2020
137	Mark Richardson	30 July 2020
138	Jaquie Brown	31 July 2020
139	Patrick Gower	3 August 2020
140	Nadine Higgins	4 August 2020
141	Pax Assadi	5 August 2020
142	Mark Richardson	6 August 2020
143	Winston Peters	7 August 2020
144	Patrick Gower	10 August 2020
145	Jason Gunn	11 August 2020
146	—N/a	12 August 2020
147	—N/a	13 August 2020
148	—N/a	14 August 2020
149	—N/a	17 August 2020
150	—N/a	18 August 2020
151	—N/a	19 August 2020
152	—N/a	20 August 2020
153	—N/a	21 August 2020
154	—N/a	24 August 2020
155	—N/a	25 August 2020
156	—N/a	26 August 2020
157	—N/a	27 August 2020
158	—N/a	28 August 2020
159	Patrick Gower	31 August 2020
160	Michèle A'Court	1 September 2020
161	Mark Richardson	2 September 2020
162	Jason Gunn	3 September 2020
163	Jaquie Brown	4 September 2020
164	Patrick Gower	7 September 2020
165	Guy Williams	8 September 2020
166	Mark Richardson	9 September 2020
167	Justine Smith	10 September 2020
168	Jaquie Brown	11 September 2020
169	Patrick Gower	14 September 2020
170	Mike McRoberts	15 September 2020
171	Mark Richardson	16 September 2020
172	Kara Rickard	17 September 2020
173	Jaquie Brown	18 September 2020
174	Patrick Gower	21 September 2020
175	Michèle A'Court	22 September 2020
176	Mark Richardson	23 September 2020
177	Guy Williams	24 September 2020
178	Jaquie Brown	25 September 2020
179	Antonia Prebble	28 September 2020
180	Kim Crossman	29 September 2020
181	Mark Richardson	30 September 2020
182	Jaquie Brown	1 October 2020
183	Judith Collins	2 October 2020
184	David Seymour	5 October 2020
185	Mark Richardson	6 October 2020
186	Stan Walker	7 October 2020
187	Jaquie Brown	8 October 2020
188	James Shaw & Marama Fox	9 October 2020
189	Steven Joyce	12 October 2020
190	Mark Richardson	13 October 2020
191	Patrick Gower	14 October 2020
192	Helen Clark	15 October 2020
193	Tova O'Brien	16 October 2020
194	Patrick Gower	19 October 2020
195	Urzila Carlson	20 October 2020
196	Mark Richardson	21 October 2020
197	Kim Crossman	22 October 2020
198	Justine Smith	23 October 2020
199	Guy Williams	26 October 2020
200	Antonia Prebble	27 October 2020
201	Mark Richardson	28 October 2020
202	Pax Assadi	29 October 2020
203	Jaquie Brown	30 October 2020
204	Jason Gunn	2 November 2020
205	Rhys Darby	3 November 2020
207	Tova O'Brien	5 November 2020
208	Jaquie Brown	6 November 2020
209	Paul Ego	9 November 2020
210	Ben Hurley	10 November 2020
211	Mark Richardson	11 November 2020
212	Kate Rodger	12 November 2020
213	Jaquie Brown	13 November 2020
214	Antonia Prebble	16 November 2020
215	Mark Richardson	17 November 2020
216	Justine Smith	18 November 2020
217	Adam Blair	19 November 2020
218	Guy Williams	20 November 2020
219	Pax Assadi	23 November 2020
220	Michèle A'Court	24 November 2020
221	Mark Richardson	25 November 2020
222	Kara Rickard	26 November 2020
223	Jaquie Brown	27 November 2020
224	Patrick Gower	30 November 2020
225	Paul Ego	1 December 2020
226	Mark Richardson	2 December 2020
227	Nadine Higgins	3 December 2020
228	Jaquie Brown	4 December 2020
229	Patrick Gower	7 December 2020
230	Jason Gunn	8 December 2020
231	Justine Smith	9 December 2020
232	Pax Assadi	10 December 2020
233	Jaquie Brown	11 December 2020

=== Season 5 ===
#	Guest host	Air date
1	Guy Williams	18 January 2021
2	Mark Richardson	19 January 2021
3	Oscar Kightley	20 January 2021
4	Justine Smith	21 January 2021
5	Jaquie Brown	22 January 2021
6	Guy Williams	25 January 2021
7	Mark Richardson	26 January 2021
8	Justine Smith	27 January 2021
9	Jason Gunn	28 January 2021
10	Jaquie Brown	29 January 2021
11	Pax Assadi	1 February 2021
12	Patrick Gower	2 February 2021
13	Mark Richardson	3 February 2021
14	Bryce Casey	4 February 2021
15	Jaquie Brown	5 February 2021
16	Paul Ego	8 February 2021
17	Urzila Carlson	9 February 2021
18	Joe Naufahu	10 February 2021
19	Kim Crossman	11 February 2021
20	Jaquie Brown	12 February 2021
21	—N/a	15 February 2021
22	—N/a	16 February 2021
23	—N/a	17 February 2021
24	Mihingarangi Forbes	18 February 2021
25	Justine Smith	19 February 2021
26	Jason Gunn	22 February 2021
27	Mark Richardson	23 February 2021
28	Nadine Higgins	24 February 2021
29	Paul Ego	25 February 2021
30	Jaquie Brown	26 February 2021
31	—N/a	1 March 2021
32	—N/a	2 March 2021
33	—N/a	3 March 2021
34	—N/a	4 March 2021
35	—N/a	5 March 2021
36	Patrick Gower	8 March 2021
37	Paul Ego	9 March 2021
38	Mark Richardson	10 March 2021
39	Justine Smith	11 March 2021
40	Jaquie Brown	12 March 2021
41	Ben Hurley	15 March 2021
42	Mark Richardson	16 March 2021
43	Pax Assadi	17 March 2021
44	Jason Gunn	18 March 2021
45	Jaquie Brown	19 March 2021
46	Kate Rodger	22 March 2021
47	Paul Ego	23 March 2021
48	Mark Richardson	24 March 2021
49	Urzila Carlson	25 March 2021
50	Jaquie Brown	26 March 2021
51	Justine Smith	29 March 2021
52	Ben Hurley	30 March 2021
53	Mark Richardson	31 March 2021
54	Kate Rodger	1 April 2021
55	Nadine Higgins	6 April 2021
56	Mark Richardson	7 April 2021
57	Dai Henwood	8 April 2021
58	Jaquie Brown	9 April 2021
59	Jason Gunn	12 April 2021
60	Kate Rodger	13 April 2021
61	Mark Richardson	14 April 2021
62	Kim Crossman	15 April 2021
63	Jaquie Brown	16 April 2021
64	Patrick Gower	19 April 2021
65	Paul Ego	20 April 2021
66	Laura Tupou	21 April 2021
67	Urzila Carlson	22 April 2021
68	Jaquie Brown	23 April 2021
69	Kate Rodger	26 April 2021
70	Mark Richardson	27 April 2021
71	Jaquie Brown	28 April 2021
72	Guy Williams	29 April 2021
73	Jaquie Brown	30 April 2021
74	Patrick Gower	3 May 2021
75	Jason Gunn	4 May 2021
76	Laura Tupou	5 May 2021
77	Jaquie Brown	6 May 2021
78	Ben Elton	7 May 2021
79	Patrick Gower	10 May 2021
80	Mark Richardson	11 May 2021
81	Kim Crossman	12 May 2021
82	Ben Hurley	13 May 2021
83	Jaquie Brown	14 May 2021
84	Patrick Gower	17 May 2021
85	Rove McManus	18 May 2021
86	Claire Chitham	19 May 2021
87	Mark Richardson	20 May 2021
88	Jaquie Brown	21 May 2021
89	Patrick Gower	24 May 2021
90	Mark Richardson	25 May 2021
91	Ben Hurley	26 May 2021
92	—N/a	27 May 2021
93	Jaquie Brown	28 May 2021
94	Patrick Gower	31 May 2021
95	Mark Richardson	1 June 2021
96	Nadine Higgins	2 June 2021
97	Claire Chitham	3 June 2021
98	Jaquie Brown	4 June 2021
99	Patrick Gower	7 June 2021
100	Mark Richardson	8 June 2021
101	Michèle A'Court	9 June 2021
102	Jason Gunn	10 June 2021
103	Jaquie Brown	11 June 2021
104	Mark Richardson	14 June 2021
105	Patrick Gower	15 June 2021
106	Nadia Lim	16 June 2021
107	Paul Ego	17 June 2021
108	Jaquie Brown	18 June 2021
109	Patrick Gower	21 June 2021
110	Jason Gunn	22 June 2021
111	Nadine Higgins	23 June 2021
112	Mark Richardson	24 June 2021
113	Jaquie Brown	25 June 2021
114	Patrick Gower	28 June 2021
115	Mark Richardson	29 June 2021
116	James Roque	30 June 2021
