= Newstalk ZB =

New Zealand talk radio network

- New Zealand
- Frequencies: See § Stations

Programming
- Format: News/talk

Ownership
- Owner: NZME Radio

History
- First air date: 1926

Links
- Webcast: Auckland; Wellington; Christchurch
- Website: Official website Corporate website

Newstalk ZB is a nationwide New Zealand talk-radio network operated by NZME Radio. It is available in almost every radio market area in New Zealand, and has news reporters based in many of them. In addition to talkback, the network also broadcasts news, interviews, music, and sports. The network's hosts include Mike Hosking, Kerre Woodham, Matt Heath, Tyler Adams, Heather du Plessis-Allan, Marcus Lush, Ryan Bridge, Andrew Dickens, Jack Tame and Francesca Rudkin. Wellington and Christchurch have a local morning show.

Newstalk ZB operates one of the largest news operations in New Zealand, with over 50 newsreaders, reporters and editors nationwide. It operates a news centre in Auckland, news hubs in Wellington, Christchurch and Parliament, and regional newsrooms in Whangārei, Hamilton, Tauranga, Rotorua, Taupō, New Plymouth, Napier, Palmerston North, Nelson, Dunedin and Invercargill. Most of Newstalk ZB's programming is produced in the NZME building in Auckland.

== History ==
=== 1926–1987 ===
The history of Newstalk ZB dates back to 1926 when Auckland station 1ZB was first started initially broadcasting on 1070AM, the station moved to 1090 kHz in 1931, 1190 kHz in 1933 and 1080 kHz in 1978. The station's brand name was the station's call sign 1ZB. A ZB station was established in the four main centres of New Zealand as 1ZB Auckland, 2ZB Wellington, 3ZB Christchurch and 4ZB Dunedin. Up until 1987 the four ZB stations were music stations running a mixture of local and networked content. Each other individual station on the Newstalk ZB network has its own history with most stations starting out as a local AM radio run by Radio New Zealand.

1ZB originally operated from Broadcasting House, a purpose-built modernist theatre and studio building on Durham Street, from 1941 until its demolition in 1990.

=== 1987–1996 ===
Newstalk ZB introduced this logo when it adopted its current talkback format in 1987.

In the mid 1980s, 1ZB Auckland lost a number of its key on-air personalities to privately owned Radio i, including Merv Smith who had hosted 1ZB's breakfast programme for over twenty years. The station's ratings subsequently plummeted as large numbers of listeners migrated to other stations. In 1987 a decision was made to re-launch 1ZB as a talkback station branded as Newstalk 1ZB. While the change was not popular initially the station showed growth by the end of the first year and by 1989 the breakfast show presented by Paul Holmes was the number one show in Auckland. In February 1993, in Auckland, Newstalk 1ZB began broadcasting on 89.4 FM as well as the original 1080 AM when local station 89X (formerly 89FM) ceased to operate, Radio New Zealand purchased this station a year earlier and chose to close it down and use the frequency for Newstalk 1ZB. The current Newstalk ZB nationwide 0800 number (0800 80 10 80) actually comes from the original 1080AM frequency in Auckland that is still in use today.

During the late eighties and early nineties Radio New Zealand switched many of their local heritage stations to FM but retained the AM frequency in each region running the same programme on both frequencies. Following the success of the talkback format in Auckland a decision was made to switch 2ZB Wellington and 3ZB Christchurch to a talkback format in 1991. At the same time new FM music stations were established in Wellington and Christchurch, these stations were B90 FM (Wellington) and B98 FM (Christchurch). In the early nineties many of the Radio New Zealand local stations that had switched to FM began running morning talkback shows on the AM frequency while continuing to play music on the FM frequency. In 1993 and 1994 the local Radio New Zealand station in some regions were rebranded with the Classic Hits name and the AM frequency was used to roll out the station across New Zealand, it was at this point Newstalk 1ZB was rebranded as Newstalk ZB. Initially those regions that ran local talkback shows on the AM frequency continued to do so and Wellington and Christchurch were initially local versions of Newstalk ZB.

=== 1996–2002 ===
In 1996 Radio New Zealand sold their commercial operation and Newstalk ZB, along with Classic Hits and ZM, became part of The Radio Network. In 2001 Newstalk ZB was further expanded into the smaller community markets in New Zealand. The smaller regions did not have their local stations rebranded as Classic Hits during the early nineties and many of these stations were still only broadcasting on AM frequencies. These stations were consolidated together in 1998 to become part of the Community Radio Network, in 2001 all Community Radio Network stations were rebranded as Classic Hits and at this point began broadcasting on FM if the station was already on FM leaving the AM frequency to now be used to broadcast Newstalk ZB. Today most Newstalk ZB stations run complete networked programming, however Wellington and Christchurch still have a local show in the mornings between 9 am and 12 pm.

=== 2002–2009 ===
Newstalk ZB's Auckland audience dropped dramatically in 2002 as music radio stations became more popular, raising questions about the future viability of the network. However, in 2013 the station had the highest market share of any commercial station nationwide.

Paul Holmes caused controversy in September 2003, after he referred to United Nations Secretary General Kofi Annan as a "cheeky darkie". Holmes was labelled racist and faced pressure to resign. He issued two nationwide apologies, sent a letter of apology to Annan and met with members of the New Zealand Ghanaian community. The incident also affected his television show, which lost the sponsorship of Mitsubishi Motors. The Radio Network took disciplinary action against him, put their staff through a training seminar on racism run by race relations commissioner Joris de Bres, and a $10,000 donation was made to Save the Children. The Broadcasting Standards Authority refused to uphold 10 complaints against Holmes for the complaint, leading one complainant to appeal the decision in the High Court. On the same breakfast show Holmes asked whether the female journalists were making journalism "ignorant and bitchy", particularly at certain times of the month. The authority found the comments were "insulting and inappropriate" but did not amount to denigrating and discriminating against women journalists.

Race relations commissioner Joris de Bres received a record number of complaints about the issue, a record later broken by a racially polarising and profanity-laden letter written by Hone Harawira. The comment also set a precedent, when former All Black Andy Haden faced calls to resign as a 2011 Rugby World Cup ambassador, after apologising for describing Pacific Island rugby players as "darkies". Prime minister John Key and sports minister Murray McCully said both Haden and Holmes used the word "darkies" in similarly offensive ways, and the public needed to forgive them in similar ways.

Artist Ralph Hotere responded to Holmes' "cheeky darky" comment with a series of artworks. One, White Drip to Mister Paul Holmes, was a 2.7-metre long piece of corrugated iron painted in black, with a drip of white paint extending nearly the full length of the work. 'To Mister Paul Holmes' is stenciled on the top of the piece, which is now one of his signature works. Holmes was apologetic and regretful about using the phrase, but later argued there was a fine line between humour and offense. The phrase featured on a commemorative tea towel, and fellow broadcaster John Hawkesby remembered Holmes as a "cheeky little whitey" at his funeral in 2013.

Holmes left his morning breakfast show at the end of 2008, and was succeeded in the role by Mike Hosking.

=== 2009–2011 ===
The Christchurch Newstalk ZB building was imploded after it sustained major damage in the 2012 earthquake.

The network went through a process of restructuring during the 2008 financial crisis, removing one reporter position in the Parliamentary press gallery, one position in Wellington, one position in Auckland, and five reporting, hosting and producing roles in Christchurch. The Christchurch local news and sport bulletins and local morning show were later reintroduced, with NZME investing $7.8 million for a 17-year license for its 100.1 FM Christchurch frequency.

Following the Christchurch earthquake on 4 September 2010 and the major aftershock on 22 February 2011 programming in Christchurch was greatly affected. After both earthquakes the station broadcast in place of other radio stations in Christchurch operated by The Radio Network, the local studios located in Worcester Street in Christchurch were evacuated. Local news services in Christchurch were replaced temporarily with the network news feed which mostly contained news stories related to the quake heard by all of New Zealand. Local news readers reported news about the quake for all of New Zealand.

The local morning show remained on the air but was broadcast from a temporary location. Following the first earthquake this was at the Whitebait Studios in Christchurch, and following the earthquake in February it was a hotel in Christchurch. The Radio Network Christchurch never returned to their Worcester Street premises and eventually set up in a new location. The building was taken down in August 2012, in New Zealand's first ever controlled building demolition with explosives.

=== 2011–present ===
The TNS T2 2013 commercial radio survey showed the network had 11.4% of audiences aged over 10, and had the most listened-to breakfast show in the country. It came as Rachel Smalley became host of the newly created Early Edition programme. The same survey in 2014 showed Newstalk ZB lost 0.3% market share but gained 7,600 listeners during a time when other NZME radio stations were in decline. It has also been observed that ZB and Mai FM are the only stations that can be received by car radios in used imported cars from Japan — of which New Zealand is a large market – due to the Japanese FM band spanning 76–90 MHz instead of the standard 88–108 MHz band.

Host Rachel Smalley apologised in April 2014 after describing New Zealand women over 72 kilograms as "heifers" and a "bunch of lardos" during an ad break when she believed her microphone was off. The comments were reported and criticised in several local and international media outlets, including news.com.au and the Daily Mail. In a tearful apology the following morning, she described her comments as deeply offensive, stupid and judgemental and said she deeply regretted her choice of words. The Broadcasting Standards Authority rejected complaints against the comments, saying they were neither calculated nor deliberate.

Blogger Cameron Slater was a regular commentator on the drive programme for several years, and has been both critical and supportive of the station's positions in the past. In 2013, the Broadcasting Standards Authority rejected complaints against Slater over his suggestions that openly gay Labour MP Grant Robertson "enjoys being stabbed from behind" – and Newstalk ZB defended what they argued was "robust, irreverent, edgy" debate. In 2014, he participated in a series of one-hour pre-election panel discussions on the drive programme. He retained the position following the release of the Nicky Hager book Dirty Politics. However, left-wing commentators called for him to be taken off-air or resign.

According to Lonely Planet in 2014, the station provided a forum for "the most lively discussions on New Zealand issues". Conspiracy theorists, veganism advocates, victims of sexual assault, and housing activists have called talkback. Regular callers include an urban Māori man, a state housing beneficiary, a security guard, a Timaru pensioner, a West Coast grandmother, a dairy farmer, a Dutch butcher and several taxi drivers.

In late September 2023, NZME launched ZB Plus, a digital subscription publication. Blogger Philip Crump, known by his pseudonymous political blogging, was named as the editor. Contributors included former MPs Muriel Newman and Katherine Rich, NZME head of business Fran O'Sullivan and former businessman and podcaster Bruce Cotterill. The publication's most notable set of stories reported on shoplifting allegations against former MP Golriz Ghahraman. By late June 2024, the website had been folded back into the New Zealand Herald.

== News ==
Newstalk ZB operates Newstalk ZB News from its Auckland news centre, producing live bulletins for the national ZB network. Wellington and Christchurch both broadcast live local news bulletins during the breakfast show, Auckland has live local bulletins at 7.00am and 8.00am, and other stations carry network bulletins every half-hour from 5am to 12am and hourly from 12am to 5am. Regional newsrooms previously provided each station with local news segments during the breakfast show. Newstalk ZB's pip sting, headlines segmented bulletin structure and "Keep up with Newstalk ZB" tagline were removed in December 2014, replaced with a single continuous bulletin, new theme music and "Now You're in the Now" tagline.

The news service covers stories, from industrial relations to prisoner rehabilitation. It extensively covers crime and court proceedings, but was criticised for publishing a wire story about the verdict against lawyer Davina Murray in 2013. Network weekday newsreaders include Niva Retimanu (Breakfast), Malcolm Jordan (Mornings), Raylene Ramsay (Afternoons), and Alistair Wilkinson (Evening/Overnight).

=== History ===
Newstalk ZB News began as Independent Radio News (IRN), a news service played on most independently owned and operated radio stations in New Zealand during the 1980s and 1990s. The majority of New Zealand radio stations not owned by Radio New Zealand (RNZ) used this news and sport service usually followed by the station's own local news and weather forecast.

In 1996 RNZ sold its commercial operation and The Radio Network (TRN) was formed, at the time TRN purchased IRN. TRN branded the news service on its own stations as Radio Network News while the news service continued to be called IRN on stations not owned by TRN despite the news coming from the same place. RNZ continued to operate its own news service on RNZ National and RNZ Concert, the two non-commercial stations that were not sold.

By 2000 a large number of independent radio stations had been taken over by RadioWorks, which did not want to pay for a news service operated by its main competitor and chose to start their own news service. After CanWest purchased RadioWorks the news service became known as the Global News Service (Global is the same name as Television network in Canada operated by CanWest), and in early 2005 it was again renamed to Radio Live News. Similarly, IRN News later became Newstalk ZB News.

Since 2016 a single news bulletin sourced from the NZME newsroom is heard on every NZME radio station (apart from Newstalk ZB) during breakfast and other parts of the day.

=== Affiliate Service ===
The Newstalk ZB Affiliates Unit is based in the Auckland newsroom, and records a variety of hourly bulletins for other stations of NZME Radio and sells its bulletins to a number of external clients including Radio 1XX – One Double-X in Whakatane and the Eastern Bay of Plenty.

== Stations ==
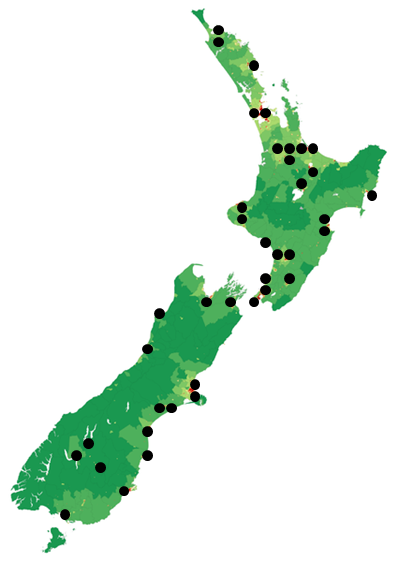
This is a map of the NZME-owned frequencies for Newstalk ZB.

These are the frequencies for Newstalk ZB:

- Kaitaia – Maungataniwha – 105.1 FM
- Kaikohe – Ōhaeawai – 1215 AM
- Whangārei – Otaika – 1026 AM, 729 AM
- Auckland – Henderson – 1080 AM
- Auckland – Sky Tower – 89.4 FM
- Waikato – Eureka – 1296 AM
- Waikato – Ruru – 97.0 FM
- Tokoroa – Wiltsdown – 1413 AM
- Bay of Plenty – Paengaroa – 1008 AM
- Bay of Plenty – Kopukairua – 90.2 FM
- Rotorua – Pukepoto – 94.3 FM
- Taupō – Tuhingamata – 96.0 FM
- Gisborne – Wainui – 945 AM
- Taranaki – Mount Taranaki – 96.4 FM
- Taranaki – Kaimata – 774 AM
- South Taranaki – Hawera Rotokare – 1557 AM
- Hawke's Bay – Pakowhai – 1278 AM
- Hawke's Bay – Mount Threave – 90.3 FM
- Whanganui – Kaitoke – 1197 AM
- Manawatū – Wharite – 100.2 FM
- Wairarapa - Masterton (Otahoua) - 103.9 FM
- Kāpiti Coast – Forest Heights – 89.5 FM
- Wellington – Tītahi Bay – 1035 AM
- Wellington – Kaukau – 89.3 FM
- Blenheim – Cavalier House – 92.1 FM
- Nelson - Grampians - 106.4 FM
- Nelson - 1341 AM
- Westport – Cape Foulwind – 1287 AM
- Westport – Waterworks Road – 95.7 FM
- Greymouth/Hokitika – Paparoa – 103.5 FM
- Greymouth & Hokitika 105.9 FM
- Christchurch – Ouruhia – 1098 AM
- Christchurch – Marshland – 1017 AM
- Christchurch – Sugarloaf – 100.1 FM
- Ashburton – Winchmore – 873 AM
- Ashburton – Somerset House – 98.1 FM
- Timaru – Fairview West – 1152 AM
- Oamaru – Weston – 1395 AM
- Wānaka – Mount Maude – 90.6 FM
- Queenstown – Peninsula Hill – 89.6 FM
- Alexandra – Obelisk – 95.1 FM
- Dunedin – Mt Cargill - 106.2 FM
- Dunedin – Highcliff Road – 1044 AM
- Southland - Hedgehope - 105.2 FM
- Southland – Dacre – 864 AM

The Newstalk ZB programme was simulcast on the former Radio Sport network frequencies following the closure of that network on 30 March 2020. There were break-outs for Super Rugby Aotearoa and selected ANZ Premiership netball match commentaries on the following Newstalk ZB Sport branded frequencies:

- Whangārei – 729 AM
- Auckland – 1332 AM
- Hamilton – 792 AM
- Tauranga – 1521 AM
- Rotorua – 1350 AM
- Taupō – 107.7 FM
- New Plymouth – 774 AM
- Napier – 1125 AM
- Wanganui – 1062 AM
- Manawatū – 1089 AM
- Wairarapa – 87.6 FM
- Wellington – 1503 AM
- Nelson – 549 AM
- Blenheim – 98.5 FM
- Westport – 91.7 FM
- Greymouth – 89.9 FM
- Christchurch – 1503 AM
- Ashburton – 702 AM
- Timaru – 1494 AM
- Dunedin – 693 AM
- Invercargill – 558 AM

The former Radio Sport frequencies were rebranded as Gold AM on 1 July 2020. The network was rebranded Gold Sport in May 2025. Following its rebrand to iHeart Country in May 2026, GOLD Sport's live sports commentaries moved to select AM frequencies branded as Newstalk ZB Sport.

== Other services ==
=== Timesaver Traffic ===
The Newstalk ZB Timesaver Traffic Centre produces and records traffic updates for all New Zealand Media and Entertainment stations. These updates for Auckland, Hamilton, Tauranga, Hawkes Bay, Wellington & Christchurch air every 15 minutes during peak breakfast and drive time slots, and hourly throughout the day and weekend on Newstalk ZB.

=== Promotions ===
Newstalk ZB runs regular promotions for movie previews and local events. The network has sponsored a range of events – from Variety, the Children's Charity special children's parties and food bank events, through to musical tours from bands like The Feelers. Its on-air competitions include breakfast giveaway campaigns like the ASB All I Want For Christmas contest. Over several years, Newstalk ZB has given funding and support to Auckland Philharmonia Orchestra, visiting international productions and local theatre companies. It also supports the work of the Westpac Rescue Helicopter service operated by the Auckland Rescue Helicopter Trust, primarily through advertising and awareness-raising.

=== Notices and cancellations ===
ZB stations have a long-running history of running notices for events and community groups. Cancellations for club and school sports events and recreation clubs have traditionally been broadcast every 30 minutes during breakfast in many markets.

=== Website ===
The Newstalk ZB website combines on-demand content with breaking news coverage. The network's Auckland, Wellington and Christchurch streams are all available on the iHeartRadio website and app.

== Reception ==
In August 2024, The New Zealand Herald reported that Newstalk ZB's breakfast show's cumulative audience had increased from under 400,000 in early 2020 to 445,300 in 2024. Newstalk ZB had 277,900 listeners in Auckland, doubling public competitor Radio New Zealand's Morning Report's in that city. The Herald attributed the radio station's competitive edge over Radio NZ to the popularity of its breakfast hosts Mike Hosking and Paul Holmes.

Newstalk ZB commercial radio ratings (May 2025)
Market	Station share	Change	Rank
All markets	14.5	▲ +0.4	1
Auckland	14.6	▲ +0.1	1
Christchurch	15.3	▲ +0.4	1
Wellington	16.3	▲ +0.7	1
Waikato	13.9	▲ +0.5	1
Tauranga	16.0	▲ +1.8	1
Manawatū	12.7	▼ −0.7	1
Hawke's Bay	14.8	▲ +2.8	1
Northland	9.9	▼ −1.6	3
Dunedin	13.3	▼ −1.6	1
Taranaki	13.2	no change	1
Nelson	11.7	▼ −4	1
Southland	8.9	▲ +0.3	4
Rotorua	8.0	▲ +0.2	6

== Controversy ==
=== Broadcasting standards breaches ===
In November 1995, Newstalk ZB was found by the Broadcasting Standards Authority (BSA) to have breached broadcasting standards when talkback host Chris Carter made comments undermining respect for the legal system during a segment involving a caller subject to a court-ordered anger management course. The host suggested ways to evade the order, disparaged legal aid lawyers as “Woolworths lawyers,” and criticised the judiciary, prompting the BSA to rule that the broadcast breached the requirement to respect the principles of law. As a result, the station was ordered to broadcast a summary of the decision.

In May 2002, the BSA upheld a complaint against Newstalk ZB after talkback host Leighton Smith referred to a group of protesters outside a Hamilton school as "mongrels" and "a pack of mongrels." While the Authority found the comments did not breach standards relating to discrimination, it ruled that the language used was offensive and breached the requirement for good taste and decency. As a result, Newstalk ZB was ordered to broadcast a statement explaining why the complaint was upheld.

In September 2004, the BSA upheld a complaint against Newstalk ZB over comments made by Paul Holmes on Paul Holmes Breakfast, broadcast on 2 April that year. Referring to rape allegations involving Australian rugby league players, Holmes described women who socialised with the players as “moles” and implied they were “asking for trouble.” The BSA ruled that the remarks denigrated women, reinforced harmful stereotypes about sexual assault, and did not qualify as serious comment or legitimate humour. Newstalk ZB was ordered to broadcast a statement summarising the decision.

In April 2019, the BSA upheld two complaints about Wellington Mornings with Heather du Plessis-Allan, broadcast on 4 September 2018. During the programme, Heather du Plessis-Allan referred to Pacific Island nations as “leeches,” prompting complaints under several standards. The BSA found the comments breached the good taste and decency and discrimination and denigration standards, stating they were inflammatory, devalued Pasifika people, and had the potential to cause widespread offence. The BSA ordered Newstalk ZB to broadcast a statement and to pay $3,000 in costs to the Crown.

In April 2024, the BSA upheld a complaint regarding Early Edition with Kate Hawkesby, broadcast on 19 June 2023. The complaint concerned Kate Hawkesby’s comments about the Equity Adjustor Score used in Auckland’s surgical waitlist system. She claimed that Māori and Pacific patients were being prioritised for surgery based on ethnicity. The BSA found this portrayal misleading, as ethnicity was only one of five factors used, and not the sole or determining one. The BSA also found the comments breached the discrimination and denigration standard by reinforcing harmful stereotypes. Newstalk ZB was ordered to broadcast a statement and pay $1,500 in costs to the Crown.

In June 2026, the BSA upheld a complaint regarding comments made by Barry Soper and Heather du Plessis-Allan during Heather du Plessis-Allan Drive on 5 September 2025 about outgoing Green MP Benjamin Doyle. During the discussion, Soper repeatedly misgendered Doyle, who is non-binary, and referred to them as "it". The Authority found the comments breached the discrimination and denigration standard and ordered Newstalk ZB to broadcast a statement summarising the decision.
