= Duncan Garner =

New Zealand right-wing television personality and journalist

- Born: 8 March 1974 (age 52); North Shore, Auckland, New Zealand
- Education: Westlake Boys High School; Auckland Technical Institute
- Occupations: Broadcaster; journalist; writer; television personality
- Years active: 1995–present
- Employers: Three 2003–2021; Stuff.co.nz 2003–present; MediaWorks 2021–present
- Television: The AM Show 2017–2021
- Children: 4
- Website: Duncan Garner: Editor in Chief

External image
- Duncan Garner; The Press

Duncan Garner (born 8 March 1974) is a New Zealand broadcaster, journalist and podcaster.

He took over the Radio Live drive slot in December 2012 and was previously the Newshub political editor in Wellington. He moved to host The AM Show in 2017, which was broadcast on Three and Radio Live. Garner left Three on 23 August 2021, after a career of almost 20 years with the channel.

After receiving a degree in communications from AUT, Garner began his career at TVNZ in the mid 1990s, as a political reporter for veteran broadcaster Paul Holmes. He was praised in his early career for his scoop-heavy journalism, winning the 2004 Newspaper Publishers' Association award for Television Political News Reporter after exposing a $195,000 golden handshake received by then-Labour Party MP John Tamihere. After a second nomination for the award, in 2010, Three launched the weekend current affairs programme The Nation with Garner as co-host.

Garner is known as an opinionated and sometimes divisive media personality, and has been described by the SBS as right-wing. He is a noted critic of Jacinda Ardern's premiership, often criticising her government's policies on his shows. He has been embroiled in several controversies to do with race and ethnicity. In 2017, Garner wrote in his Stuff.co.nz newspaper column of a "human snake" in a Kmart queue, to comment on high levels of South Asians and Syrians immigrating to New Zealand. The Press, who published his comments, found his comments to be in breach of anti-racism standards. He is also noted for his impassioned response to Taika Waititi's criticism of racism in New Zealand, and criticism of the New Zealand government's response to the COVID-19 pandemic. In spite of his strong opinions, Garner has claimed to be a non-voter and not a member of any political party.

Garner went onto present a mid-morning show for the news and talk radio station Today FM, which ceased broadcasting after just over a year on air. He was retained by station owners Mediaworks to present a podcast – Duncan Garner: Editor in Chief.

== Early life ==
Garner was born on 8 March 1974 on Auckland's North Shore, and attended Westlake Boys High School in Forest Hill. He studied for a communications degree at Auckland University of Technology.

== Journalism career ==
He started his career as a reporter for Television New Zealand in 1995, working on the current affairs show Holmes from 2000 to 2002.

Garner then moved to rival TV3 in 2003. He broke the story of a NZ$195,000 golden handshake that Labour Party MP John Tamihere received leaving the Waipareira Trust in October 2004. The story prompted an investigation by the Serious Fraud Office, which caused Tamihere to resign from Cabinet. Tamihere was later cleared of financial impropriety, and the story won Garner the 2004 Newspaper Publishers' Association award for Television News Reporter – Politics.

In August 2008, three months before the New Zealand general election, Garner broadcast audio tapes secretly recorded at a National Party cocktail party by Kees Keizer. The tapes caught deputy leader Bill English saying he would sell Kiwibank, and MP Lockwood Smith saying National had to adopt policies the party did not like in order not to scare voters. The broadcast earned Garner a nomination for Best News Reporting in the 2009 Qantas Film and Television Awards.

In March 2010, TV3 launched the weekend current affairs programme The Nation, with Garner as co-host.

In the wake of the 2010 MPs expenses scandal, Labour Party politician Chris Carter alleged that Garner had a vendetta against him. The head of TV3 news and current affairs Mark Jennings replied saying Garner did not have a grudge, and "Carter is a serial offender on expenses ... it's Duncan's job to shine the light on that."

In 2013, Garner hosted two new current affairs shows on TV3 – 3rd Degree and The Vote.

In December 2017, Garner wrote a column for Stuff.co.nz entitled "Dear NZ, how do we want to look in 20 years?" in which he advocated against liberal immigration policy. In the column he claimed he saw a "massive human snake" of immigrants "crawling its way around the self-service" at the low-cost supermarket Kmart, which he attributed to heightened rates of Indians, Pakistanis, Sri Lankans and Syrians immigrating to New Zealand. He also claimed the scene was a "nightmarish glimpse into our future" that "could have been anywhere in Southeast Asia" and that "by 2038... there'll be more Asians than Māori... Does it matter? You bet it does." Garner's comments caused widespread debate and outrage among many, and he was accused of being, among other things, a racist and a white supremacist. Garner categorically denied the claims, which he attributed to "self-appointed wannabe intellectuals that believe they're truly superior". In his defence he pointed to his Māori former partner, Mihingarangi Forbes, and the education of their children in a kura kaupapa Māori. The council for The Press newspaper, who published his column, unanimously found that he had breached its principle on discrimination and diversity. The panel wrote that "despite the writer's protestations to the contrary, his approach can only be seen as gratuitous racism".

In April 2018, Garner angrily responded to Taika Waititi's blunt description of racism in New Zealand in Dazed and Confused. Garner claimed Waititi's comments were "sabotage", and called Waititi a "clown" who was "getting on the world stage and denigrating this country". Garner even suggested the comments amounted to treason, given Waititi had won the Kiwibank-awarded 2017 New Zealander of the Year. Garner's response was criticised as being against "the voice of reason", and Waititi taunted him on social media in response.

In December 2018, Garner lashed out after a Māori Father Christmas made an appearance at a Christmas parade in Nelson, saying on his show that "Māori don't have to own everything". The character's appearance at the parade was subject to jeers and racist backlash across New Zealand from Pākehā. Garner's comments were criticised as emblematic of race-baiting by to-be-Māori Development minister Willie Jackson.

Garner was a noted critic of Jacinda Ardern's premiership, and has claimed her "big promises have failed spectacularly". In July 2020, he promised to becoming a vegan for a year if Labour were to win enough votes in the 2020 general election to govern alone. On 17 October 2020, Labour was the first New Zealand party to reach this achievement under the MMP electoral system. On 20 October, Garner wrote an article where he acknowledged his commitment and indicated that he would attempt to fulfil it. In August 2020, he criticised the lockdowns enforced by Labour to control the COVID-19 pandemic as "ultraconservative". After a spell at his home after contracting COVID-19, he claimed the COVID-19 managed isolation system a "failure" and a "multi-agency trainwreck".

In November 2020 he was named Supreme Man on David Hartnell MNZM's Best Dressed List.

On 23 August 2021, Garner announced that he was leaving TV3 with immediate effect, after a career of almost 20 years with the channel. He cited personal and family reasons as the cause of his resignation.

He went onto present Duncan Garner Today, a mid-morning news and talk show for Today FM, which launched on 21 March 2022.

Just over a year later, on 30 March 2023, Today FM ceased broadcasting, shortly after breakfast presenter Tova O'Brien interrupted Garner's show to announce the station's closure. Both Garner and O'Brien, who had addressed the station's future during the 'Tova' breakfast show, went onto criticise station owners Mediaworks until the show was abruptly taken off air and replaced by automated music. The station's closure was confirmed later that day.

In May 2023, it was announced that Garner would be retained by Mediaworks and present a new daily podcast, Duncan Garner: Editor in Chief, which launched on 8 May 2023.

=== Awards ===
- 2004 Qantas Media Award for Television News Reporter – Politics – Tamihere golden handshake/SFO investigation
- 2007 Qantas Television Award, Television journalist of the year

== Personal life ==
Garner was in a relationship with television journalist Mihingarangi Forbes for nine to ten years until 2008 and they have two daughters. Garner also had a child from another relationship. Garner was married to Deanna Delamere for six years until they separated in 2018, and they have a son. In March 2026, Garner allegedly drove on a central Auckland road while his license was suspended. He is due to appear in court in April.

== See also ==
- List of New Zealand television personalities
