= Janika ter Ellen =

New Zealand television presenter

- Occupations: Reporter, News anchor
- Employer: Mediaworks New Zealand
- Spouse: Ross Karl

Janika ter Ellen is a New Zealand television broadcaster who was previously a news anchor for the Sky TV owned News show, Prime News, which broadcast on Sky Channel 004 and Freeview Channel 10. She has also previously worked across The Paul Henry Show, Firstline, 3 News' 6pm bulletin, and Nightline, covering everything from the Scott Guy trial to New Zealand Fashion Week, being a reporter for the past three years for 3 News before joining The Paul Henry Show lineup as the news presenter.

She is married to Ross Karl, rugby reporter for the now-defunct Newshub.

== Career ==
She studied political science and media studies at Victoria University of Wellington, before completing her journalism training at the New Zealand Broadcasting School in Christchurch. After a six-month stint at RadioLIVE, she joined 3 News. She has been a reporter for 3 News for three years, based in the Wellington bureau, and has worked across Firstline, 3 News’ 6pm bulletin, and Nightline.

On 27 January 2014, The Paul Henry Show premiered on TV3, with ter Ellen as the news presenter alongside show host Paul Henry.

She was the recipient of the Best Dressed Female Supreme Award in David Hartnell's 2014 Best-Dressed List.

== See also ==
- The Paul Henry Show
- List of New Zealand television personalities
