= List of art rock musicians =

This is a list of musicians whose general body of work is described as art rock.

- Al Berkowitz
- Animal Collective
- The Beatles
- Black Country, New Road
- Blank Manuskript
- The Blue Nile
- Deadsy
- Deaf School
- Engine Alley
- FFS
- Franz Ferdinand (Band)
- Forenzics
- Gazpacho
- Henry Cow
- The Gunga Din
- King Missile
- Little Tragedies
- London Grammar
- Methyl Ethel
- MGMT
- Neøv
- Ok Goodnight
- Pere Ubu
- Red Krayola
- Roxy Music
- Television
- The Sea and Cake
- The Smile
- The Stranglers
- Split Enz
- U2
