= Julia Moore =

Julia Moore may refer to:

- Julia A. Moore (1847–1920), American poet
- Julia Compton Moore (1929–2004), wife of United States Army officer Hal Moore
- Julia Hartley Moore, New Zealand private investigator, author and producer

== See also ==
- Julie Moore, British civil servant in the National Health Service
- Julianne Moore (born 1960), American actress and children's author
