= Sky Open (TV channel) =

New Zealand free-to-air television network

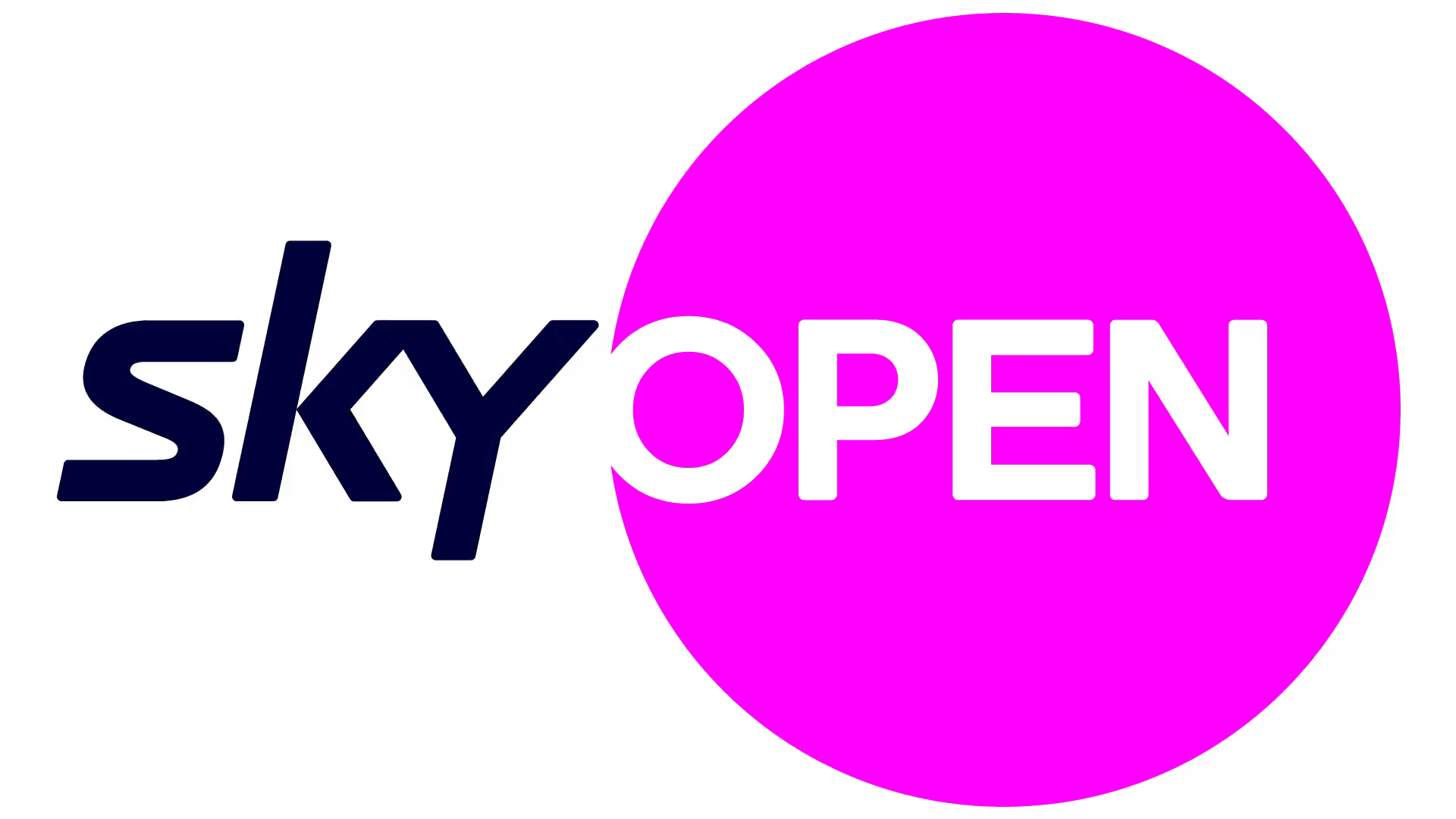
- Country: New Zealand
- Broadcast area: National

Programming
- Picture format: 1080i HDTV

Ownership
- Owner: Sky Network Television
- Sister channels: Bravo; Eden; HGTV; Rush; Three

History
- Launched: 30 August 1998
- Former names: Prime (1998–2023)

Links
- Website: www.sky.co.nz/skyopen

Availability

Terrestrial
- Freeview: Channel 8

Sky Open (formerly known as Prime) is a New Zealand free-to-air television network. It airs a varied mix of programming, largely imported from Australia, the United Kingdom and the United States.

It was originally owned by Prime Television Limited in Australia. Prime later entered into a joint-venture agreement with Nine Entertainment Co. (Nine Network Australia) in February 2002, causing the network's graphics to look like the Nine Network. On 8 February 2006, the Commerce Commission gave Sky clearance to purchase the station for NZ$31 million.

Prime's analogue terrestrial signals had covered 91% of the population via the state-owned Kordia transmission network. It is currently available free-to-air on Sky on satellite and Kordia on terrestrial.

== History ==
=== Prime (1998–2023) ===
Logo, 2013–2016

Logo, 2016–2023

Logo, 2023

In 1997, the Australian Prime Media Group, owner of Seven affiliates in south-eastern Australia (Prime Television) and regional Western Australia (GWN) announced its plan to enter the New Zealand TV market. While it was aligned with Seven, it could not air programmes from that network because the rights were already held by the two existing major companies: TVNZ and TV3. These limitations proved to be hurdles for the development of the network in New Zealand, as it planned to enter with live sport and feature films.

During early 1998, the United Christian Broadcasters purchased 34 TV licences of UHF spectrum from TVNZ that had been used for the defunct Horizon Pacific and MTV channels. Then during June 1998, Prime Television Limited in Australia purchased the unused 34 TV licences from United Christian Broadcasters for approximately A$3.6 million. The licences covered all major cities and towns, mainly on UHF, except for the Gisborne area, which is served via a VHF signal. On 30 August 1998, Prime Television New Zealand began broadcasting at 6.30 pm with Two Fat Ladies.

Originally the station broadcast classic British programming, documentaries, sports and dramas aimed at the 30 years and above age bracket. In Waikato and Christchurch, Prime produced a half-hour nightly news programme. Although these programmes rated well, they were unprofitable.

In February 2002, Prime New Zealand entered into an agreement with Australian media mogul Kerry Packer's PBL (parent of the Nine Network). Under this five-year agreement, Nine agreed to provide the station with content it owned the rights to, expertise and an amount of cash. In return, Nine was given the right to acquire 54% of Prime New Zealand at the end of the contract. If Prime New Zealand continued to lose money, Nine could choose not to take this up.

After this deal, Prime took on a broader and more expensive programming mix and axed the local content to cut costs. This increased ratings and profits significantly. This new format was modelled closely on the Global Television Network in Canada, whose parent company Canwest happened to own TV3 at the time.

Almost immediately, some Australian programmes produced by Nine Network and shown on Prime NZ took on a slightly New Zealand flavour. For example, one New Zealander per week began to appear on the Australian version of Who Wants to Be a Millionaire?, and weather details for New Zealand cities appeared on the Australian Today breakfast programme. Localisation of Australian programmes increased, with New Zealander Charlotte Dawson becoming the presenter of a New Zealand version of Nine travel programme Getaway (Dawson left this position at the end of 2006). Many Australian programmes were simply broadcast on Prime without any adaptation for New Zealand audiences, however.

The new line-up was comparable to TV2, as the British programming was replaced largely by made-for-TV movies and infotainment programmes. In addition to Nine's content, Prime had an output deal with Paramount for films and TV series.

During 2003–2004, the number of Australian programmes broadcast decreased. These were largely replaced with more expensive (and higher rated) British and American programmes, such as a Sunday evening British drama slot.

On 2 November 2004, TVNZ presenter Paul Holmes announced that he was resigning from his Holmes programme on the state broadcaster and beginning a new one on Prime in 2005. This new programme, called Paul Holmes, began on 7 February 2005. The arrival of Holmes was seen as a major sign of Prime's rise in status, from a small, second-tier network to a major player on the New Zealand scene, joining TVNZ and TV3 in this regard. The programme, however, did not rate well. In June 2005, Prime moved the show to 6 pm, directly following Prime News, in an attempt to increase ratings. This was ultimately unsuccessful and Prime TV cancelled the programme on 8 August 2005 due to poor ratings. Holmes returned to host a one-hour weekly current affairs/interview programme, which was still called Holmes, and screened on Thursday evenings. In 2006, the show was relaunched as a strictly entertainment-oriented talk show and screened on Wednesday evenings. It did not return in 2007, but two "specials" were filmed. For most of 2007, Holmes' work for Prime consisted solely of a weekly opinion segment, broadcast Sunday nights as part of Prime News.

In late December 2004, Prime announced it had acquired New Zealand broadcast rights for the new series of Doctor Who, one of its highest-profile imported shows, which went on to screen in June 2005 to generally good ratings until December 2017 when TVNZ 2 took over the broadcasting rights to the show.

In 2005, Prime announced that it would broadcast a minimum of 5.5% of local programmes, following recommendations from NZ On Air.

From 6 October 2005, Prime showed a weekly programme called New Zealand's Top 100 History Makers, where a brief biography of notable New Zealanders was shown as ranked by a panel of experts. The final episode, screened on 17 November 2005, showed the rankings of these people as a result of votes collected from the public via text and Internet.

In November 2005, Sky Television purchased Prime for NZ$30 million. The deal was subject to Commerce Commission approval and undisclosed conditions. On 8 February 2006, following receipt of Commerce Commission clearance, Sky Television purchased Prime New Zealand from Australian-based Prime Television. The acquisition of Prime by Sky Television saw a range of shows screened on Sky channels now included on Prime, these shows included American Chopper and MythBusters, which screen on the Discovery Channel. The move was seen with some concerns from the local television industry, under the grounds that Sky's money would be used to buy content for it.

In December 2005, it was announced that Prime had secured the 2006 free-to-air delayed broadcast of rugby union from TV3.

On 4 September 2006, the network relaunched with a modified logo, already seen in print advertisements, and new on-air branding.

In April 2008, Prime switch to broadcasting in a lower quality anamorphic widescreen 16:9 format following the lead of other Freeview and Sky channels. Previously they had opted to use the more proportionally scaled letterboxed format for 16:9 content. They like other Kordia PAL analogue broadcasters are using a 14:9 letterbox format on their PAL simulcast.

Prime signed a deal with CBS Television Distribution to air exclusive first run content from 1 January 2013.

On 13 February 2016, Prime underwent a brand refresh and began permanently broadcasting in High Definition.

In 2018, Love Island started showing on this channel shifting from TVNZ 2.

On 28 March 2023, Prime updated with a new look featuring the outline version of the 2016 logo.

On 17 August 2023, it was announced that Prime would change its name to Sky Open on 23 August 2023.

=== High Definition ===
In 2010, Prime HD was temporarily launched only on Sky TV Channel 140 to cover the 2010 Winter Olympics. Prime HD was only available during every Olympics or Commonwealth games on Channel 444. Freeview HD viewers did not have the option to see the Olympic or Commonwealth games in high definition.

On 13 February 2016, Prime underwent a brand refresh and began permanently broadcasting in High Definition.

On 11 December 2019, Prime was made available in HD to Freeview DTT viewers.

=== Freeview ===
On 7 May 2007, a consortium of broadcasters including TVNZ, MediaWorks (owners of TV3 and C4), Maori Television Service, and Radio New Zealand launched the non-profit, free-to-air Freeview service, the nationwide digital free-to-air system in New Zealand. The service was initially broadcast via the Optus D1 satellite in standard definition only, but in April 2008 extended to a high definition digital terrestrial service which is broadcast in main centres only.

Prime was widely expected to be included in the initial group of Freeview channels, but Sky Television had consistently refused to take part, citing poor economics. Broadcasting Minister Jonathan Coleman then asked officials to invite Sky, Freeview and state-owned transmission company Kordia to meet him to discuss the matter, but Sky TV spokesman Tony O'Brien was quoted as saying "It is not economic for Prime to be on Freeview at this time." The economics had to do with non-government-owned broadcasters paying less for transmission costs on the government-owned Kordia network.

A deal between TVNZ and Sky to have TVNZ 6 and 7 available to Sky subscribers in exchange for Prime finally being launched on Freeview with a virtual channel assignment of 10 on 17 August 2009. If Prime would have joined at launch then they may have been able to get a lower assignment, however virtual channel assignments are only enforced on certified receivers. It is also noted virtual channel 10 is not far off its usual tuning to push-button 9 on analogue television sets, due to its historic links with the Nine Network, its allocation on Sky's former analogue terrestrial service, and for compatibility with video recorders using the G-Code scheduling system.

Prime joined Freeview on 17 August 2009 and is broadcasting in the clear on both the satellite and terrestrial services.

From October 2013, Sky ceased the encryption on the three regional satellite feeds for Prime, so they could be used for channel locked, Freeview certified satellite receivers. However, TVNZ is still only linking to the Auckland regional feed for all areas.

Prime swapped Freeview positions with Te Reo, on 1 March 2023, with Prime moving to channel 15, and Te Reo moving to channel 10.

On 29 January 2026, Sky Open was shifted to Freeview channel 8 as part of a reshuffling of Sky Free's various channels, taking over the position of Eden. At the same time, the channel was also made available to stream live on the ThreeNow app.

== News First ==
From launch Prime broadcast local newscasts in Christchurch and Hamilton on weeknights at 5:30pm. Christchurch's bulletin was anchored by Vanessa Rawson, with Mei Taare anchoring Hamilton's bulletin. Both bulletins ran for half an hour, but due to intense competition for local news in Christchurch and a lack of viewership, both bulletins were cancelled. Prime launched a nightly news bulletin – branded as Prime News – First at 5:30, from 2004. Unlike their early foray into local news, the new bulletins were screened nationwide and as a result, held a stronger national focus.

It was confirmed on April 10, 2024, News First at 5:30PM would cease production due to Warner Bros. Discovery's closure of the Newshub newsroom. It is unknown whether the newscast "could be salvaged, whether or not it was under the Newshub banner," according to Stuff NZ, however the newscast ceased broadcasting on the same day as Newshub.

=== Hosts ===
- Weekdays – Eric Young 2006 – 2024
- Weekends – Janika ter Ellen 2015 – 2023
- Substitute – Janika ter Ellen

=== Former hosts ===
- Suzy Clarkson (née Aiken) 2004 – 2010
- Ross Karl (Sports)
- Kelly Swanson-Roe
- Karen Rutherford
- Alistar Wilkinson
- Charlotte Bellis
- Wayne Hay
- Garry Wilkinson

=== Presentation ===
2004–2006
Launched in February 2004 as Prime News – First at 5:30 and was presented on weeknights by former Getaway (TVNZ version) presenter and ABC (US) reporter Suzy Clarkson (née Aiken) and was produced in Sydney by Sky News Australia, using the resources of Sky News Australia and Newstalk ZB broadcasting from a chroma keyed studio.

2006–2015
In 2006 Prime and Sky TV moved to a new broadcast hub in Albany near Auckland New Zealand, A new studio and host Eric Young coincided with the move and a relaunch of Prime. Prime News, and used the same graphics and music as its sister bulletin Sky News, it also sourced more local content sourced primarily from 3 News.

The role of sports newsreader was held by Suzy Clarkson (née Aiken), and newcomers Kelly Swanson-Roe and Ross Karl, with Clarkson also reading the weekend news. Political coverage was provided by Newstalk ZB political editor Barry Soper, along with several other Wellington-based reporters, at this stage Prime had no full-time South Island reporters.

During the Rugby World Cup 2011, Prime News hosted several bulletins from the ANZ Viaduct Events Centre in Central Auckland.

During the 2012 London Olympic Games Prime News broadcast from a temporary shared space with Sky Sport.

2015-2023

On 23 January 2015 it was announced that Prime News will be Produced by MediaWorks (now produced by Warner Bros. Discovery NZ), and it was confirmed that Janika ter Ellen, and Wayne Hay will replace Eric Young due to his current commitments he was unable to present the show.

The new look show debuted on Sunday 1 March presented by Janika ter Ellen. On Monday 13 April Eric Young returned as Weekday Anchor, with Wayne Hay moving to 60 Minutes and Janika ter Ellen staying at weekends.

On 16 February 2016 a new look logo was launched and news began being presented and broadcast in High Definition.

As part of the rebranding to Sky Open on 23 August 2023, Prime News was rebranded as News First.

=== Current affairs ===
Current affairs is provided as a New Zealand-hosted version of the CBS show 60 Minutes with the bulk of the stories coming from the foreign show.

Hosts included:

2015 : Charlotte Bellis

2016 : Alistair Wilkinson

== Programming ==
=== Sports ===
With Sky Open fully owned by Sky Network Television, it has access to a large selection of sports content that Sky broadcasts, this content is typically delayed with some live coverage of certain events to fulfill free-to-air requirements, as Sky is effectively selling them to itself. Prime used to broadcast a weekly Sunday afternoon sports highlights show called Ultimate Sport Sunday, which included highlights of cricket, rugby union, NRL, Formula One, WRC and Moto GP.

Prime was also granted the rights to broadcast the free to air screening of Euro 2008. Free to air coverage of the 2012 London and 2016 Rio Olympics was seen on Prime with Sky being the new rights holder.. Prime/Sky Open also broadcast one-hour versions of WWE Raw, WWE NXT and WWE Smackdown from 2019-2024.

=== NZ On Air funded ===
==== Native concept ====
- Back Benches
- The Brokenwood Mysteries

=== Locally made programmes ===
The following shows are screened for most of the year (normally only excluding summer months)

Show	Release date	Notes
60 Minutes	2013	New Zealand version of the news and current affairs show 60 Minutes. Previously screened on TV3.
The Crowd Goes Wild	2006	Sports entertainment show presented by Andrew Mulligan and James McOnie.
Fishing NZ		Fishing show presented by Adam Clancey
Getaway	2002	Travel show previously screened on TVNZ
News First	2004	Evening news bulletin which screens 30 minutes earlier than rivals 1News At 6pm and Newshub Live at 6pm. Formerly Prime News - First at 5:30.
Sky Sport		Coverage of various sporting matches.

=== Past/ended locally-made programmes ===
Show	Screened	Notes
Holmes	2005	Current affairs show presented by Paul Holmes. He previously presented a nightly current affairs show titled Holmes on One between 1989 and 2004 but moved to Prime in 2005. The show was initially titled Paul Holmes and screened at 7pm. The show moved to 6pm, mid-2005, now titled as Holmes and was later cancelled due to low ratings.
New Zealand's Got Talent	2008	New Zealand version of the Got Talent series. The show screened one season on Prime in 2008, a second screened on One in 2012, and a third season in 2013 but was axed in 2014.

=== Past news programming ===
Prime used to broadcast Nine Network Australia's early morning news programmes such as Today and, until 6 February 2007, National Nine News: Morning Edition when the Nine Network had ownership. Overnight, and during important international news events such as the 2008 US Presidential Election, it has relayed the international feed of US news channel Fox News.

=== Output contracts ===
- Skydance
  - Paramount Global Distribution Group (exclusive)
  - Warner Bros. Worldwide Television Distribution (from 2019)
- NBCUniversal International Television Distribution (non-exclusive)
- Lionsgate Worldwide Television Distribution Group (first-option with Sky and Prime channels)

== Sky Open +1 ==
Sky Open +1
- Broadcast area: National

History
- Launched: 1 February 2017
- Closed: 29 January 2026
- Former names: Prime Plus 1 (2017–2023)

Sky Open +1 was an hour delayed timeshift channel of the Sky Open broadcast. It was launched on 1 February 2017 as Prime Plus 1. It was available on Sky channel 514 and Freeview channel 21.

The channel was removed from Sky and the Freeview satellite platform on 19 December 2024, leaving it only on the Freeview streaming app. On 29 January 2026, Sky Open +1 discontinued broadcasting.

== See also ==
- Sky News Australia
- Sky News
- Sky Network Television
