= Melody Rules =

- Created by: Geoff Houtman; Mihera Paterson
- Developed by: Geoff Steven
- Written by: Kathryn Burnett; David Geary
- Directed by: Michael Robinson
- Starring: Belinda Todd; Jodie Rimmer; Iain Chapman; Elliott O'Donnell; Alistair Douglas; Susan Brady; Alan Brough
- Composer: Steve Robinson
- Country of origin: New Zealand
- Original language: English
- No. of seasons: 2
- No. of episodes: 40

Production
- Executive producer: Geoff Steven
- Producer: Ross Jennings
- Running time: 22 minutes
- Production company: Ross Jennings Productions

Original release
- Network: TV3
- Release: April 2, 1995 – 1995

Melody Rules is a New Zealand sitcom created by Geoff Houtman and Mihera Paterson for TV3. It featured former Nightline host Belinda Todd as Melody, a hard-working sibling guardian surrounded by a gaggle of eccentric friends and family. The series was structured in a similar manner to an American sitcom, containing elements such as a laugh track and vaudeville-esque humour.

Although it ran for a total of 40 episodes over two seasons in 1995 and 1996/97, it was neither a critical nor commercial success. It has been named one of the worst sitcoms of all time.

== Premise ==
Melody Rules centred on Melody Robbins (Belinda Todd), a conscientious and mild-mannered travel agent attempting to rein in her wayward siblings while her mother is off on an archaeological dig in Malaysia. She is aided and abetted by Fiona (Susan Brady), her ditzy air hostess best friend; Brendan (Alan Brough), her hapless co-worker; and Neville (Alistair Douglas), her nosy, filthy, and unkempt neighbour with the catchphrase "Ya decent?".

At the time, Todd was best known for her role as co-host of TV3's late news programme Nightline. She had little acting experience and was known more for her sexy, outrageous on-screen persona.

== Production ==
Melody Rules was fledgling broadcaster TV3's first attempt at a sitcom, and it was hoped the show would form one of a number of flagship productions for the station. They received $1,262,990 funding from NZ On Air for production.

TV3 paid an American television writer, John Vorhaus, to hold workshops in New Zealand, teaching hopeful writers how to script an American-style sitcom. This influenced the style of Melody Rules.

According to director Michael Robinson, the recording of Melody Rules took place in a small studio at TV3's headquarters in Auckland. The scenes were shot with three cameras and the footage was vision switched (compiled at the time of recording from the three camera shots provided) from an outside broadcast unit in the loading bay instead of the studio control room. Due to the studio's size, there was no live audience so the laugh tracks had to be added during post production.

== List of episodes ==
=== Season 1 ===
1. "Going, Going...Goner" (2 April 1995)
2. "Maximum Security" (9 April 1995)
3. "Basic Insect" (16 April 1995)
4. "Superstar: The Zoe Robbins Story" (30 April 1995)
5. "Crayfish L'Amour" (7 May 1995)
6. "Fried Green Blobs" (14 May 1995)
7. "Air Brendan" (21 May 1995)
8. "Gentlemen Prefer Babes" (28 May 1995)
9. "Lost in the Masquerade" (3 June 1995)
10. "The Fugitive" (11 June 1995)
11. "Movin' On Up" (17 June 1995)
12. "Here's to You, Misses Robbins" (24 June 1995)
13. "Death of a Saleswoman" (1 July 1995)
14. "Quality Time" (8 July 1995)
15. "Brendanstein" (15 July 1995)
16. "Tie a Yellow Chainsaw Round the Old Oak Tree" (22 July 1995)
17. "Stop Press" (5 August 1995)
18. "Luck Be a Monkey Tonight" (12 August 1995)
19. "Friendly Fire" (19 August 1995)
20. "The Honourable Mr Robbins" (26 August 1995)

=== Season 2 ===
1. "Inside Job"
2. "We Are Family"
3. "The Devil You Know"
4. "Gullibles Travels"
5. "Double Scotch"

== Reception ==
=== Critical reception ===
Critical reception for Melody Rules was poor, and it is considered in New Zealand to be one of the worst sitcoms of all time. It has also become part of the lexicon within the Kiwi television industry to describe an unsuccessful sitcom; for example, "That show will be the next Melody Rules." The series has been labelled as "cringeworthy" and "atrocious" by The New Zealand Herald, one of New Zealand television's "disasters" by Scoop, and "awful" by the Waikato Times.

Alan Brough and Belinda Todd both regret starring in the series; Todd compared it to Macbeth in terms of "bad luck", and described it as "absolutely ghastly." Brough described working on the series as "such a horrendous experience", adding "I was so embarrassed by it, I had to go overseas." Both Brough and Todd claim the series was substantial in convincing them to leave New Zealand and move to Australia and the United States, respectively. The series has developed a "certain cult status" for its perceived low quality. Despite this, Brough and Jodie Rimmer went on to lead fruitful acting careers, while Elliott O'Donnell is now known as Askew, a successful graffiti artist.

The failure of Melody Rules has been attributed to poor comedy writing, low budget production, miscast actors, and cultural incompatibility between the American-style sitcom and the comedy that New Zealanders prefer. In the years since Melody Rules, there have been no further American-style sitcoms produced in New Zealand.

=== Scheduling and ratings ===
Melody Rules initially aired at 7pm on Sundays with the first episode ("Going, Going... Goner") aired on 2 April 1995. After being pulled from its Sunday night timeslot due to poor ratings, the series was moved to Saturdays at 7pm from 17 June to 26 August and then "stripped" five days a week, Monday to Friday, at 5pm during the summer of 1996/97.

== Cultural references ==
In 2019, a comedy podcast about the creation of the sitcom titled "The Worst Sitcom Ever Made" was released by RNZ. Episodes were presented by creator Geoff Houtman and featured interviews from the writing staff, crew and cast members.
