= Suzy Clarkson =

New Zealand television personality

Suzanne Elizabeth "Suzy" Clarkson (née Aiken) is an author and former New Zealand television personality. She was a news presenter at Prime Television from 2004 to 2010.

== Television career ==
Aiken qualified as a physiotherapist and moved into television roles in the late 1980s, appearing on the New Zealand version of Blind Date as a presenter in 1989. Through the 1990s, she presented a range of travel programmes including Holiday and Getaway. She also produced and presented a collection of aerobic series in the early 1990s, The New Zealand Fit Kit 1 and 2, Fitness Plus and Move It, and made a cameo appearance as an aerobics instructor in the first episode of Shortland Street.

She presented from New Zealand for several international broadcasts including for the ABC Millennium Special in 2000, for which she won an American Emmy Award.

Aiken became the anchor and producer for Prime News First at 5:30 from its launch in February 2004. She became Suzy Clarkson after her marriage to Tim Clarkson in early 2006. On 15 February 2006 the New Zealand press announced Prime was replacing Clarkson as its news presenter with Alison Mau. However, on 24 February it was reported that Prime had withdrawn its offer to Mau after what she described as "inexplicably callous treatment." Eric Young took over hosting the weekday show, with Clarkson moving to presenting the weekend news and weekday sports news. She left this role in November 2010 to work in corporate communications positions for Coca-Cola Amatil New Zealand and, later, Metlifecare.

== Personal life and family ==
Suzy Aiken married Tim Clarkson in early 2006. They have two children.

She has published two books: published Fit for Birth and Beyond: The guide for women over 35. This was her second book, following Healthy Body Healthy Mind, which was published in 1997.

== See also ==
- List of New Zealand television personalities
