= Forenzics =

New Zealand band

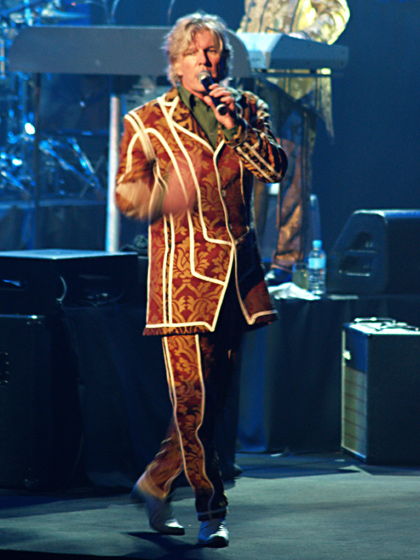
- Tim Finn live with Split Enz in 2006

Background information
- Also known as: ForENZics
- Origin: Auckland, New Zealand
- Genre: Art-rock
- Years active: 2020–present
- Label: Warner Music New Zealand
- Members: Tim Finn; Eddie Rayner; Noel Crombie; Phil Manzanera

Forenzics is a New Zealand musical project formed by Tim Finn and Eddie Rayner in 2020. It's a project that includes 'shades & echoes' of early Split Enz repertoire. The songs are combinations of new and re-imagined lyrics and music.

The "guest" players on the recordings include former member of Split Enz Noel Crombie. Phil Manzanera, who produced Split Enz's second album Second Thoughts is a featured guitarist on several songs. It also features Megan Washington. Other players come via Eddie Rayner's instrumental ensemble Double Life - Mark Denison (saxes, clarinet, flute), Adrian Stuckey (guitars, bass) and Patrick Kuhtze (drums). Double Life had created a bunch of inspired instrumental 'jams' which Eddie sent to Tim to imagine lyrics and melodies. This resulted in half the album's repertoire resulting from the jams and the other half using 'shades & echoes' of early Split Enz songs and ideas. The name "Forenzics" is a play on the band's original name "Split Enz", a name they changed from "Split Ends" to represent New Zealand. The name and album name is to project the idea that they are using fragments from their past songs into their new ones.

== History ==
Phil Manzanera said the project was instigated in 2020 when he found an old rehearsal tape of Split Enz; he digitised it, thought it sounded "amazing" and emailed it to Tim Finn, the first re-engagement between the pair in years. This also later ignited another project between the two, releasing an album in August 2020 called Caught by the Heart.

In early 2020, the band spontaneously released its first single on YouTube (accompanied by a video) called "Walking", which was a reinvention of Split Enz's "Walking Down a Road" from the Split Enz album Mental Notes. Between then and early 2021, they released two more music videos inspired by Mental Notes songs: "Strange Stars" (inspired by "Under the Wheel") and "Abandoned" (inspired by "129/Matinee Idyll"). All of these songs are included in the 2022 debut album Shades and Echoes.

"I sent Eddie a garage band [sic] sketch and loved how he developed it. We live in different parts of Auckland, different strands of the isthmus, and avoid traveling across town as much as possible. So we were summoning memories and working blind throughout." Tim Finn says.

Eddie Rayner handled the production of all the songs in his own home studio. The release of Shades and Echoes was postponed from 2021 to 2022 due to the delayed manufacturing and delivery of vinyl and the COVID-19 pandemic.

== Discography ==
This discography relates to releases by Forenzics. See Split Enz discography for other works by Forenzics.

=== Studio albums ===
Title	Year	Peak chart positions
Title	Year	NZ
Shades and Echoes	2022	26

=== Singles ===
Title	Year	Album
"Chances Are"	2021	Shades and Echoes
"Premiere Fois"	2021	Shades and Echoes
