= How's Life? =

New Zealand television talk show

- Opening title sequence in 2002
- Genre: Talk show
- Developed by: Greenstone TV
- Presented by: Charlotte Dawson
- Country of origin: New Zealand
- Original language: English
- No. of seasons: 3

Production
- Running time: 22–26 minutes

Original release
- Network: TVNZ 1
- Release: 2001 – 2003

How's Life? is a New Zealand television talk show produced by Greenstone TV and broadcast on TVNZ 1 from 2001 to 2003. It was hosted by Charlotte Dawson and featured a recurring panel of New Zealand entertainment figures, politicians, journalists and specialists. In each episode, questions sent in by viewers would be discussed by the panellists, who would offer advice and share perspectives. The questions typically concerned interpersonal issues.

== Format ==
Each episode takes place with Dawson and four panellists seated at a table, with Dawson in the middle acting as the main host. Several questions by viewers are put to the panel each episode, often in the form of a prerecorded video. The panellists would then have an open conversation about the issue, offering different advice and perspectives, and often talking directly to the camera as if they are speaking to the viewer. The format drew comparisons to agony aunt media.

The show was angled towards a lighter tone, with banter between Dawson and the panellists, light comedy, and tongue-in-cheek questions. However, the show also dealt with questions of a serious nature, including abusive relationships and health issues. On at least two occasions, the BSA received complaints about the advice given on How's Life?, but did not uphold them, in part due to the show presenting itself as entertainment.

The production team claimed that at its peak, the show received up to 60 letters and emails a day from viewers seeking advice.

== Panellists ==
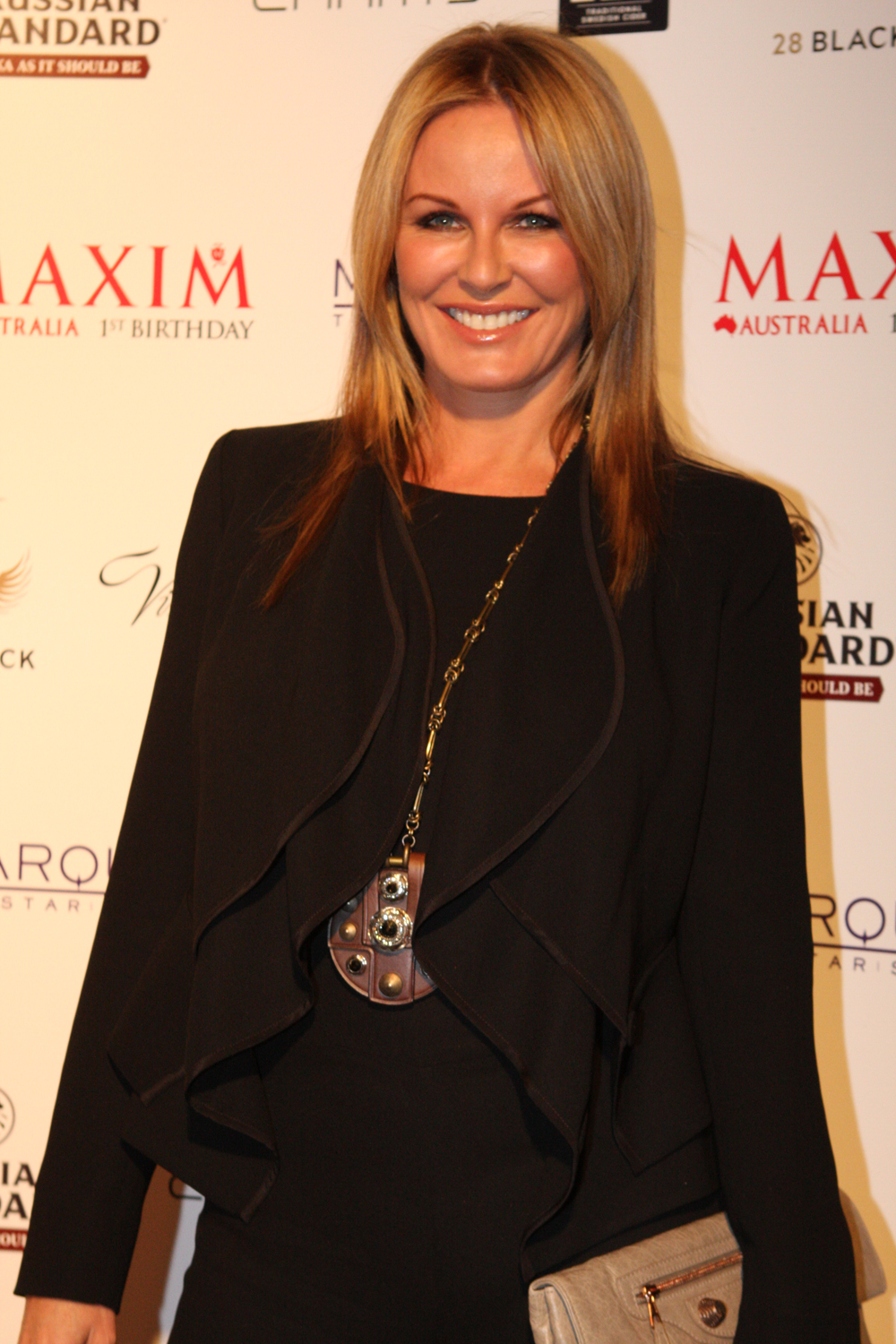
Dawson in 2012, who was the host of the show

How's Life? had a recurring panel of co-hosts in addition to Dawson. The makeup of the panel varied during the course of the series. Panellists included media personalities, actors, politicians, authors, and journalists, as well as guests with specialist skills such as private investigators and former military.

- Christine Rankin
- Jude Dobson
- Julia Hartley Moore
- Kerre Woodham
- Marcus Lush
- Mark Wright
- Merepeka Raukawa-Tait
- Paul Henry
- Peta Mathias
- Pio Terei
- Robyn Malcolm
- Suzanne Paul
- Tau Henare
- Lani Lopez
- Cindy Gibbons
- Colin Hogg
- John 'Horse' McLeod
- Martin Crump
- Vena Crawley

== Production and broadcast ==
How's Life? was developed by Greenstone TV and recorded in Auckland, and was loosely inspired by Beauty and the Beast, a 1970s New Zealand show hosted by Selwyn Toogood. It was produced by Wendyl Nissen and Jo Raj, and was directed by Wayne Leonard, Julia Leonard, and Norman Sievewright at different times throughout the series. Julia Parnell also worked as production coordinator.

The show was broadcast each weekday on TVNZ 1 during the 5:30pm timeslot. Panellist Raukawa-Tait wrote in 2014 that the production team would record 3 to 4 episodes in half a day to meet the schedule.
