= Joanna Paul-Robie =

New Zealand journalist and news presenter

Joanna Paul-Robie is a New Zealand news presenter and producer. She grew up in Hamilton, and made her screen acting debut in 1978. She started in broadcasting as a trainee programme director with Radio New Zealand in the 1980s, while also participating in "behind the camera" film roles. She made her television presenting debut with TVNZ's Wildtrack in 1989, but was soon recruited to be the breakfast newsreader on the new TV3 channel. Six months later, she took over presenting the evening news from Philip Sherry, as well as TV3 programme Nightline from 1990 to 1992.

After leaving TV3 in 1992, she returned to TVOne as an anchor on One Network News. In 2002, she moved to Maori Television as General Manager of Programmes and Production until leaving in 2004.

In 2011, she reflected on her career in an interview with Screentalk.

Since then, she has made further documentaries, worked as a media consultant, and lectured in Media Studies. On 27 June 2024, Paul-Robie announced she had terminal cancer.

== See also ==
- List of New Zealand television personalities
