= Sacha McNeil =

New Zealand journalist and news presenter

Sacha McNeil (born 1975) is a New Zealand journalist and news presenter, and is the daughter of Jeanette and Bob McNeil, who was also a television news reporter.

McNeil has been a TV reporter and presenter since 1999, including appearing on the shows One News, Breakfast and Tonight, before joining the 3 News and Sunrise teams in August 2007, where she worked alongside her father Bob McNeil.

She gave birth to a girl in 2009. McNeil presented the news on early morning programme Sunrise till 2010 and then became presenter of the 3 News Midday bulletin.

She presented TV3 programme Nightline from 2011 to 2013. She left her presenting position in 2011 on maternity leave, with Ingrid Hipkiss filling in. She gave birth to her second child in 2012 and returned to presenting Nightline in April 2012.

In December 2013 it was announced that McNeil would present early morning news programme Firstline alongside Michael Wilson in 2014, following Nightline's cancellation. Firstline was later cancelled in April 2015.

In 2019 she left TV3 to join TVNZ as a reporter on Seven Sharp and has since been both a reporter and occasional fill-in host.

McNeil describes herself as a hand-crafter, and has started a webpage to celebrate things creative.

== See also ==
- List of New Zealand television personalities
