= Blank Manuskript =

- Origin: Salzburg, Austria
- Genres: Progressive rock, art rock
- Years active: 2008-present
- Members: Jakob Aistleitner, Peter Baxrainer, Simon Strasshofer, Dominik Wallner, Alfons Wohlmuth
- Website: www.blankmanuskript.at

Blank Manuskript is an art rock project from Salzburg, Austria. They are usually described as Progressive Rock with a certain focus towards contemporary rock program music. They are known for their exotical costumes on stage and their almost theatre-like performances. The band members are all multiinstrumentalists and play many different instruments on stage. They have released five studio albums so far, which are all concept albums. Their latest release was an album consisting of three concerts in 2022: Argekultur Salzburg, Night of the prog and Woodstock Forever. They have been on numeral European tours since 2015 and have played major Progressive Rock-Festivals all over Europe including Prog%27Sud 2018, Festival Crescendo 2019, Night of the-Prog 2022, Woodstock Forever 2022, Minnuendo 2022, ArtRock-Festival Reichenbach 2023.

== Band members ==
- Jakob Widerin – Saxophone, Flute, Electric Guitar, Glockenspiel, Percussion, Vocals
- Peter Baxrainer – Electric Guitar, Acoustic Guitar, Vocals
- Simon Strasshofer – Drums, Percussion
- Dominik Wallner – Piano, Electric Piano, Organ, Synthesizer, Vocals
- Alfons Wohlmuth – Electric Bass, Flute, Vocals

== Discography ==
=== Albums ===
- Tales from an Island - Impressions from Rapa Nui (2008)
- A Profound Path (2013)
- The Waiting Soldier (2015)
- Krásná Hora (2019)
- Himmelfahrt (2020)
- A Live Document (2023)

=== Compilations ===
- The Divine Comedy Part II - Purgatorio (2009; Musea)
- Rökstenen - A Tribute to Swedish Progressive Rock of the 70's (2009; Musea)
- The Divine Comedy Part III - Paradiso (2010; Musea)
- The Tales of Edgar Allan Poe (2010; Musea)
- The Stories of H.P. Lovecraft (2012; Musea)
- Decamerone - Ten Days In 100 Novellas Part III (2016; Colossus/Just for Kicks)
- Live-Session at ORF Radiokulturhaus (2018; Melodic Revolution Records)

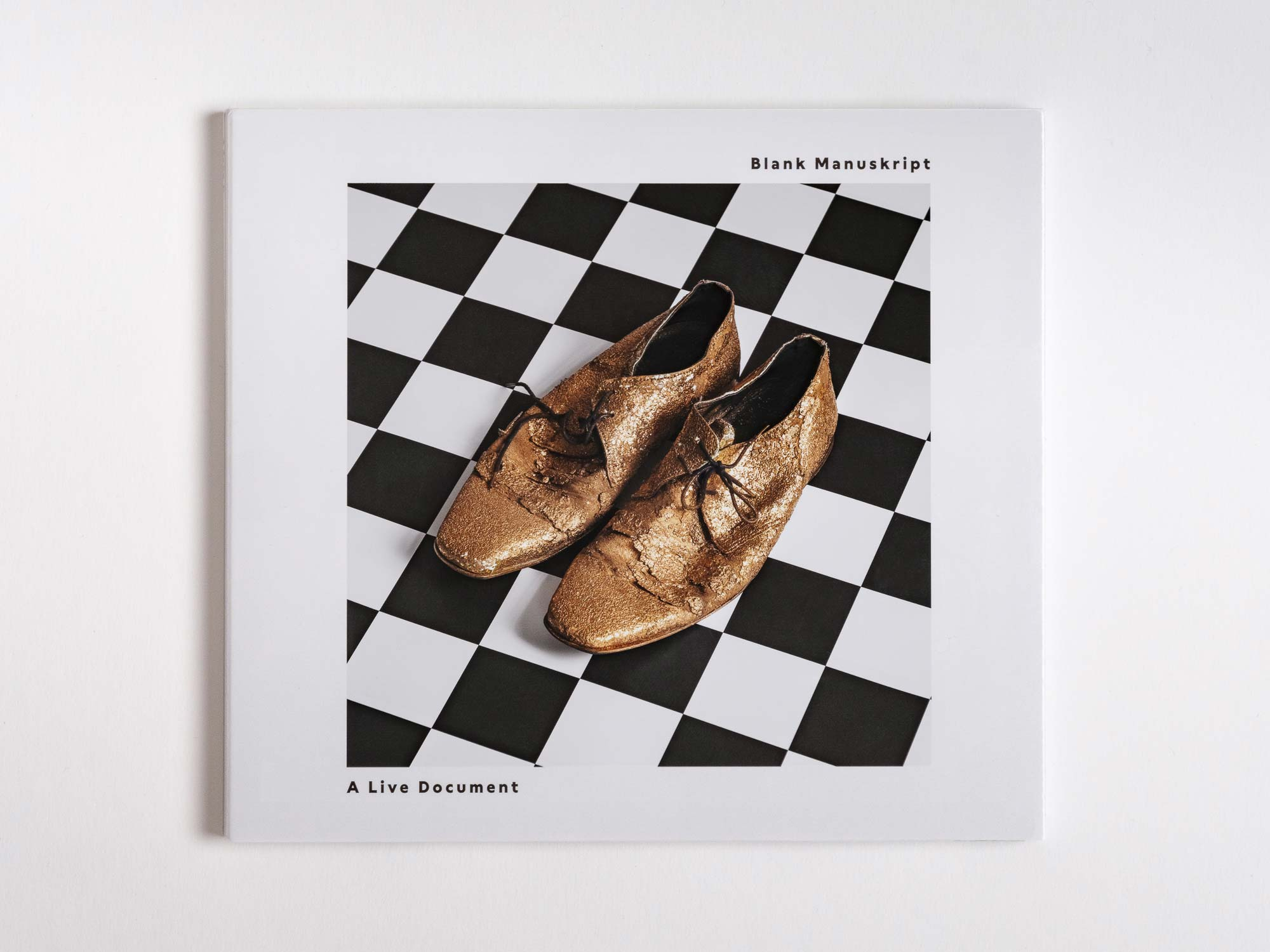
Album Artwork: A Live Document 2023

== Album Artworks ==
Philip Reitsperger and the design Studio Identity Lab designed the album artworks for Blank Manuskript's releases.
