= Darren McDonald =

Australian news anchor (born 1967)

Darren McDonald (born 1967) is an Australian news anchor known for his work on Australia's Seven Network and New Zealand's TV3.

== Career ==
McDonald was one of Australia's youngest news anchors, first presenting at age 17. Darren went on to read the news on 11am, and then became the first anchor of Sunrise News when it launched to cover the first Gulf War.

Darren later worked at National Nine News, and was a reporter with the program Sex.

He later became a news reader in New Zealand at TV3 in the late 1990s, where he regularly presented late night news programme Nightline.

== Personal life ==
McDonald is gay. In early 2002, a number of people were arrested for selling methamphetamine and importing MDMA into New Zealand; McDonald was amongst them. In 2003, he pleaded guilty to offering to supply methamphetamine and conspiracy to supply ecstasy. He admitted having been a drug addict from the age of 21, saying that he would spend around $1000 on drugs each week, and that he had even read the news while high on methamphetamine.

== See also ==
- List of New Zealand television personalities
