= Blue Monkey (song) =

1994 single by Suzanne Paul

- Cover for the compact disc compilation release

Single by Suzanne Paul
- Released: 1994
- Studio: Auckland Audio, Ponsonby
- Genre: Dance, house, novelty song
- Songwriters: Paddy Free, Suzanne Paul

"Blue Monkey" is a novelty dance song released by Suzanne Paul in 1994. It is the only original single to be released by Paul, and was distributed by Prestige Marketing in a compilation album, Blue Monkey Plus 70's Dance Hits. The album also includes an extended dance mix version.

In December 1994, the song entered the New Zealand single charts at 41, where it remained for one week.

== Background ==
In 1994, Paul was in the early stages of building a television career, becoming recognisable in New Zealand for her work as an infomercial presenter. In a magazine interview, Paul said she released the single to demonstrate she was more than "the intense over-the-top woman who sold things on television".

Paul stated that the concept was inspired by a conversation between herself and a friend visiting from Britain, about a perceived lack of dancing in nightclub culture in New Zealand. The song is allegedly named after a British nightclub they both visited, and was intended as a comedy song to get people dancing.

The "Blue Monkey" refers to a dance that was created for the song, with a more complicated version dubbed the "Funky Blue Monkey", choreographed by dancer and actress Janine Burchett. In a promotional instructional video released by Prestige Marketing, Paul and Burchett demonstrate both versions of the dance.

== Composition and recording ==
Blue Monkey
Section of "Blue Monkey" with infomercial samples and monkey noises.

"Blue Monkey" was written by Paddy Free of Pitch Black, with lyrics jointly written by Suzanne Paul. It is primarily sung by Paul, but includes backing vocals by Boh Runga and Mark Hickstead, and saxophone by Walter Bianco of the band Herbs. It was recorded at Auckland Audio, a studio in Ponsonby.

"Blue Monkey" is a fusion of house, funk and pop, with a four-on-the-floor beat. In addition to the main vocal performances, it uses repeating vocal samples from Paul's infomercials, including her "luminous spheres" catchphrase from the Natural Glow products she is closely associated with. There are also monkey noises playing in the background in multiple sections of the song.

== Music video ==
The music video for "Blue Monkey" depicts Paul arriving at a nightclub with a friend, then doing "The Blue Monkey" dance with a crowd of dancers, inter-spliced with stylised shots of Paul presenting infomercials to match the vocal samples in the song. The club shots were recorded at a gay nightclub named Staircase, located on K Road. The video was directed by Mark Tierney of the band Strawpeople.

== Response and legacy ==
"Blue Monkey" received mixed responses. It was reportedly popular in the gay community and praised by fellow TV personalities, but was also criticised as a novelty production. In a retrospective piece, Elizabeth Beattie of Junkee ranked the single number 3 in a list of "10 Weirdest New Zealand TV Moments Of All Time". In 2017 at CANZ conference at the University of Canterbury, Dr Scott Wilson of the Unitec Institute of Technology cited "Blue Monkey" as a notable example in his presentation about New Zealand one-hit-wonders and novelty songs.

In 2015, Paul said she was "ecstatic about the song" and believed it would have gone viral if it was made in the 2010s. However, in a 2024 interview, Paul said that she wished she never thought of the song and wanted to "forget all about" the track, claiming that she was frequently asked by members of the public if she wanted to "do The Blue Monkey".

== Charts ==
Chart (1994)	Peak position
New Zealand (Recorded Music NZ)	41
