= Patrick Kuhtze =

New Zealand drummer and actor

- Born: Patrick Kuhtze; 1962 or 1963 (age 63–64)
- Other name: Pat Kuhtze
- Occupations: Session musician; drummer; actor
- Spouse: Suzanne Paul (married 2022–present)

Patrick Kuhtze (born 1962 or 1963) is a New Zealand drummer, session musician, and actor. Kuhtze has performed as a session drummer in both live and studio performances with a large variety of acts since the 1990s, and is credited on albums including Dane Rumble's The Experiment and Carly Binding's Passenger. Kuhtze also performs in Double Life, an ensemble led by Eddie Rayner, and the related musical project Forenzics with Tim Finn. In in 2022, Kuhtze, Rayner, and Andrew Snoid formed Another Life and released an album together. The following year, Kuhtze joined the glam rock band Space Waltz.

As an actor, Kuhtze has appeared in commercials and television shows since the mid-1990s, including Shortland Street and Xena: Warrior Princess, and the docudramas Pike River and Friend of the Friendless. Kuhtze played a detective in the television film Lawless (1999), but made his first theatrical film appearances with small roles in The Subtle Art of Not Giving a Fuck (2023) and Pike River (2026).

== Early and personal life ==
Kuhtze married Suzanne Paul in 2022. The couple live together in their coastal home in Auckland.

Kuhtze is also a drum clinician and runs educational events through schools.

== Career ==
=== Acting career (1994–present) ===
Kuhtze's first credited appearance was in a commercial was for DB Breweries in 1994. He has consistently acted in commercials throughout his career, appearing in over 40 as of 2026. Kuhtze's first performance in a television series was a small part in an episode of Plainclothes, broadcast in 1995. He went on to appear in Xena: Warrior Princess as a guard and Belart in series 2 and 3, respectively. Other roles in the 90s include as Wax Man in series 4 of Hercules: The Legendary Journeys, and a detective in the television film Lawless (1999). In the 2000s and 2010s, Kuhtze's roles included multiple appearances on Shortland Street and appearing in episodes of The Almighty Johnsons, Westside, and Power Rangers S.P.D.. In 2016, Kuhtze appeared in Pike River, a docudrama following the events of the 2010 Pike River Mine Disaster. This is not to be confused with his later role as Spud in the 2025 theatrical film Pike River. In 2024, Kuhtze played Bruce in series 2 of Not Even.

=== Drumming and session work ===
Kuhtze is recognised in the New Zealand music industry for his work as a drummer and session musician, and has performed with acts such as Dane Rumble, Jordan Luck, Ray Columbus, and Dennis Chambers. He claims to have been Billy T. James' "full time drummer" for the last two years of the comedian's life.

In 2018, Kuhtze contributed to the CD for Chris Sanders' children's picture book and album These Memories Make You and Me.

In 2022, Kuhtze formed the group Another Life with Eddie Rayner and Andrew Snoid. The group toured the north island and has released two albums on Bandcamp. Kuhtze also worked with Rayner on other projects including a jazz album, and is part of Rayner's ensemble Double Life. Since 2020, Kuhtze has performed with Forenzics as a joint project with Double Life.

In 2023, Kuhtze joined the glam rock band Space Waltz for their return album Victory.

In 2026, Kuhtze led the performance as a drummer at the New Zealand Ball 2026, organised by the New Zealand Society Thailand and New Zealand–Thai Chamber of Commerce.

== Filmography ==
=== Film ===
Year	Title	Role	Notes	Ref.
1999	Lawless	Detective	Television film	
2023	The Subtle Art of Not Giving a Fuck	Cop		
2025	Pike River	Spud		

=== Television ===
Year	Title	Role	Notes	Ref.
1994	Plainclothes	Drugs buyer		
1996	Xena: Warrior Princess	Ballart	Series 2	
1997	Xena: Warrior Princess	Guard	Series 3	
1996	Hercules: The Legendary Journeys	Wax man		
1997	Pio!		Also credited as writer	
1999	Tunnel Vision	Host		
2002	Mataku	Drummer		
2003	Shortland Street	Andrew Bolton		
2005	Power Rangers: S.P.D.	Worker		
2006	Orange Roughies	Bradbury		
2006	Doves of War	Prison Warder		
2012	The Almighty Johnsons	Judge		
2012	Shortland Street	Mr Maher		
2013	Agent Anna	Mechanic		
2015	The Brokenwood Mysteries	Motel Owner	S02E04	
2015	Shortland Street	Derek Skelton		
2016	Westside	Keppler	Series 2	
2016	Pike River	Sparkie	Docudrama	
2020	Friend of the Friendless	Glen Jackson	Docudrama	
2022	Good Grief	Rob	S02E06	
2024	Not Even	Bruce	Series 2	
