= Paul Henry (broadcaster) =

New Zealand radio and television broadcaster

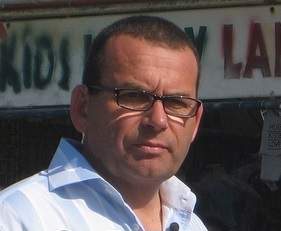
- Henry in 2008
- Born: Paul Henry Hopes; 4 August 1960 (age 66); Auckland, New Zealand
- Occupations: Television presenter; radio personality; news presenter; game show host; Author
- Years active: 1987–present
- Employers: MediaWorks New Zealand; TVNZ
- Political party: ACT; (since 2026)
- Other political affiliations: National (1999–2024)
- Spouses: Rachael Hopes (divorced); Linzi Dryburgh (m. 2009; div. 2019); Diane Foreman (m. 2020)
- Children: 3

Paul Henry Hopes (born 4 August 1960), known professionally as Paul Henry, is a New Zealand radio and television broadcaster. After starting his career at the BBC Henry spent time working for National Radio, and later 2ZD, before starting his own station, TodayFM. Henry then spent much of the early 2000s working for Television New Zealand and Radio Live. In 2012 Henry moved to Australia to host Network Ten's new morning show.

Upon his return, Henry spent much of the 2010s working for TV3, first hosting late night show The Paul Henry Show, before hosting simulcast breakfast show Paul Henry on TV3 and Radio Live. In 2016, Henry announced his semi-retirement. Since then he has hosted two seasons of The Traitors NZ. He won Bronze as Best Host for series 1 at the New York Festivals in April 2024. As of 2026, Henry is now host of The Chase New Zealand and has sat on the board of Television New Zealand.

== Early life ==
Paul Henry Hopes was born in Auckland, New Zealand, to Brian and Olive Hopes, on 4 August 1960. He attended Cockle Bay Primary in Howick, Auckland. His parents separated when he was 11, and in 1971 he moved with his English-born mother to Bristol, United Kingdom, where he finished his education and won a drama school scholarship. Paul and his mother Olive lived in a council flat. Olive worked triple shifts in a plastic bag factory to make ends meet. Henry says that when he was 25 he discovered that his grandmother was a "Gypsy".

== Television and radio career ==
=== New Zealand ===
Henry began his broadcasting career working for the BBC, as a studio assistant and in the mail room. He worked as a projectionist in the Natural History Unit, where, according to the Sunday Star Times, "David Attenborough would come in and Henry would play the rushes". Henry returned to New Zealand when he was 19 and worked as a producer on National Radio.

From 1986 to 1990, Henry worked as a breakfast host on 2ZD Wairarapa. In 1991, Henry left 2ZD to establish rival radio station Today FM, hosting the station's breakfast show. Other notable Today FM staff included Hilary Pankhurst, Georgina Beyer, local identity Rick Long, and former 2ZD station manager John Shearer. In 1992, Henry sold the station to the owner of Port FM.

In the early 2000s, Henry was a panellist on the show How's Life?. He went on to be a foreign correspondent and weekend talkback host for Radio Pacific, later presenting breakfast programme The Morning Grill with Arch Tambakis, then Pam Corkery. Henry also presented the station's drive programme, and was the inaugural drive presenter at Radio Live when the station launched in 2005.

In 2004, Henry was appointed co-host of TV One's Breakfast. In 2009, ratings for the show had improved to around 150,000 viewers from a base of around 100,000. Between 2007 and 2008, Henry also presented episodes of This Is Your Life, and was a backup host for current affairs show Close Up. At the 2010 Qantas Film and Television Awards, Henry was awarded the People's Choice Award for Best Presenter. His acceptance speech attracted more than 300,000 views on YouTube.

In October 2010, Henry was forced to apologise, and later resigned from TVNZ, after controversy over his pronunciation and ridicule of the name of Indian politician Sheila Dikshit, as well as comments made about the then-Governor-General of New Zealand, Sir Anand Satyanand. In an interview the following month, Henry claimed that TVNZ, in particular chief executive Rick Ellis, had "capitalised" on him by encouraging him to be controversial on-air, adding that he believed it was wrong for the New Zealand Government to apologise to India for his remarks.

On 1 April 2011, MediaWorks New Zealand announced Henry would return to Radio Live in July, replacing Maggie Barry as the host of the station's drivetime show, a position he had held four years previously. His tenure in the role would this time last just over half a year; Henry moved to Australia the following year to host Network Ten's new morning show.

In 2011, Henry published an autobiography, What Was I Thinking. The book was a bestseller upon release.

=== Move to Australia ===
In February 2012, Henry relocated to Sydney, Australia, to co-host Network Ten's morning show Breakfast. The show debuted on 23 February 2012 to low ratings. As in New Zealand, Henry's on-air comments caused controversy: in May 2012 he suggested asylum seekers could stay in people's linen cupboards, and implied they were "dirty".

Due to low ratings, Henry's Breakfast was cancelled on 30 November 2012 after less than one year on air. During the show's broadcast period, one of Henry's co-hosts and the show's executive producer quit, prompting speculation about whether the departures were due to tension with Henry. A newspaper reported other staff at the network resented Henry, claiming many wouldn't look at him when he walked in the room, and were planning to boycott the Christmas party. Both Henry and the low ratings of the show were continually lampooned by the comedy show The Hamster Wheel.

=== Return to New Zealand and semi-retirement ===
Henry returned to New Zealand after Breakfast's cancellation. While in Australia, Henry maintained work in New Zealand media as an Australian correspondent for Radio Live and as the host of Would I Lie to You? on TV3. In 2013, Henry released another book, Outraged, also a bestseller.

In late 2013 it was revealed that from 2014 Paul Henry would be hosting a late night current affairs show called The Paul Henry Show, which would replace the long-running Nightline. The Paul Henry Show lasted one year; in early October 2014 Henry was announced as the presenter for Mediaworks' new breakfast show to air simultaneously on TV3 and Radio Live. This new venture, entitled Paul Henry, replaces both TV3's Firstline and Marcus Lush's morning segment on Radio Live. In 2016, Henry departed Mediaworks and announced he would be entering a period of "semi-retirement", splitting his time between New Zealand and the United States, and producing wine.

Following the effects of the COVID-19 pandemic in New Zealand, MediaWorks announced a new show hosted by Henry titled Rebuilding Paradise with Paul Henry. The show ran over four weeks in April 2020 and featured live interviews in regards to the country's response to COVID-19. This is the first project Henry had taken part in since the announcement of this period of "semi-retirement".

In late 2020, Henry released his third bestseller, titled I'm in a United State.

Henry has released three vintages of Central Otago Pinot Noir, the most recent in 2020. All sold out within weeks.

In June 2024, Henry spoke as a guest speaker at the ACT Party's 2024 "Change Makers" event. In his speech, he accused the previous Labour Government of saddling the country with "astonishing debt." Henry said that New Zealand was "broken and in desperate need of repair." He also said that he "believed that ACT could be the last cab left on the rank heading in the right direction."

Henry hosted series 1 and 2 of The Traitors NZ. He won Bronze as Best Host for series 1 at the New York Festivals in April 2024. Series 2 aired in 2024.

In 2025, Henry was announced as host of The Chase New Zealand which aired in of 2026. In June 2025, Henry was appointed to the board of Television New Zealand and held that position until his resignation in July 2026 following his political candidacy announcement for the ACT Party.

== Personal life ==
Henry is currently married to entrepreneur Diane Foreman. He was previously married to Rachael Hopes (née Orsman), with whom he had three children. Henry was also previously married to radio producer Linzi Dryburgh.

In 2014 it was reported in an interview that Henry was a nudist, which Henry has also stated on his show.

== Political career ==
New Zealand Parliament
Years	Term	Electorate	List	Party
2026–present	55th	List	4	ACT

Henry ran as the National Party candidate for the Wairarapa electorate in the 1999 general election. He lost to former radio colleague and Labour candidate Georgina Beyer by 3,033 votes.

In July 2026, Henry announced his candidacy with the ACT Party in the 2026 New Zealand general election as a list candidate. He was ranked fourth place on the ACT party list. On 7 November, Henry was elected to the New Zealand Parliament on the ACT Party list.

== Views and controversies ==
=== Female facial hair ===
In March 2009, Henry caused offence by making fun of the facial hair of female guest anti-nuclear campaigner and Greenpeace worker Stephanie Mills. TVNZ stated that it had received a "handful" of complaints. Henry stated to the Sunday Star Times: "I certainly have no intention of apologising to people who have written in and complained. The key thing to me is what a fortunate life they must have that they can afford time and energy to complain about such an insignificant thing."

=== Views on homosexuality ===
In August 2009, Henry referred to homosexuals as "unnatural", prompting a complaint to the Broadcasting Standards Authority, which regulates broadcast radio and television content within New Zealand. In February 2010, the Broadcasting Standards Authority declined to uphold the complaint.

=== Susan Boyle ===
In November 2009, Henry sparked controversy when he called singer Susan Boyle 'retarded'. His comments led to almost 200 complaints to the Broadcasting Standards Authority and an apology from Television New Zealand.

=== Governor-General of New Zealand Sir Anand Satyanand ===
In October 2010, Henry was again the subject of complaints after a live broadcast in which he asked Prime Minister John Key whether the Governor-General, Sir Anand Satyanand, was "even a New Zealander". Henry went on to ask "Are you going to choose a New Zealander who looks and sounds like a New Zealander this time... are we going to go for someone who is more like a New Zealander this time?" Anand is of Indian descent but was born and raised in Auckland. Henry was criticised by Key, Labour leader Phil Goff and race relations commissioner Joris de Bres. Henry later apologised for his comments. After initially expressing its support for Henry, TVNZ announced the following day that it had suspended the presenter for two weeks without pay.

=== Sheila Dikshit ===
Following the decision to suspend Henry, TVNZ continued to air a clip in which Henry referred to Delhi's chief minister Sheila Dikshit during the 2010 Commonwealth Games as "the dipshit woman" and pronouncing her surname as "Dick Shit" despite later being told it was "Dixit", going on to state that "it's so appropriate, because she's Indian, so she'd be dick-in-shit wouldn't she, do you know what I mean? Walking along the street... it's just so funny." An interview with Sheila Dikshit confirmed Henry's pronunciation was correct. In an interview with Sunrise, Henry claimed people in India also find the name humorous and that he thinks the "biggest insult" is deliberately mispronouncing someone's name just because it sounds funny.

New Zealand Indian Central Association president Paul Singh Bains said the fact that TVNZ was still "promoting" the clip on its website showed it had "totally lost the plot" and was insensitive to the offence Henry had caused. Following at least four complaints against the video, TVNZ removed it from the "Video extras" section of their website. Henry's resignation polarised the New Zealand public, with supporters claiming he was a victim of political correctness, and critics accusing him of pandering to the lowest common denominator. Henry later explained his resignation from TVNZ, saying, "there was a lot of stuff going down against Television New Zealand and I didn't want to put them through that anymore."

India summoned New Zealand's high commissioner Rupert Holborow to protest against Henry's "racist and bigoted" comments, and Holborow expressed his regret for the "deep hurt" they had caused.

=== Asylum seekers ===
On 16 May 2012, Henry was criticised for comments made on Breakfast regarding asylum seekers. When commenting on a newspaper article, about the Australian Government offering families money to house asylum seekers, Henry suggested that the idea could be "broadened out" saying: "I mean if this is all about saving money you could broaden it out. Why not criminals? Not murderers, but low level criminals. You could - the jails could be smaller and you could put them in homestay situations. The mentally ill". He later suggested the asylum seekers could be housed in linen cupboards. His remarks were featured on Media Watch.

Henry caused further controversy on 27 August 2012, by suggesting on the programme that asylum seekers should "starve to death" following reports that they would be conducting a hunger strike over plans to shift them to Nauru. He issued an apology the following morning following public backlash on Twitter.

=== Risqué shooting comments ===
During a Radio Hauraki interview on 23 July 2026, Henry said that he would shoot Labour Party leader Chris Hipkins when asked by his host which three political leaders (National Party leader Christopher Luxon, Hipkins and New Zealand First leader Winston Peters) he would choose to "shoot, shag or marry." He drew criticism from Hipkins and Labour MP Ayesha Verrall, who described them as offensive and amounting to a death threat against Hipkins. Henry defended his remarks and accused the Labour Party of "manufactured outrage." ACT party leader David Seymour and ACT MP Nicole McKee defended Henry's remarks, with the latter saying they needed to be taken with the context of a risqué game.

== See also ==
- List of New Zealand television personalities
