= Bob McNeil (journalist) =

New Zealand journalist and news presenter (1942–2024)

Robert William McNeil (19 March 1942 – 29 December 2024) was a New Zealand radio and television journalist who worked for TV3 for over 20 years.

== Biography ==
McNeil was born on 19 March 1942 in Wellington to parents Neil and Jean McNeil, and his childhood was spent in Saint Bathans, Ōkato, Waipukurau, and Hāwera. After leaving school, he first worked for the Taranaki Daily News in New Plymouth, but because of rugby commitments, left to work in a dairy factory for a year. He then studied at Palmerston North Teachers' College from 1961 to 1962, and worked as a school teacher for seven years.

McNeil met his future wife, Jeanette, in 1967 during his OE in the United Kingdom, and they later married when they returned to New Zealand in early 1969. He then taught for two years at Devon Intermediate in New Plymouth. He gave up teaching at the end of 1970 and took a job at Radio Waikato in Hamilton, where his three children—including Sacha, who also became a journalist—were born between 1973 and 1977. He covered the Springbok tour protests there in 1981 while working at 1ZH. In 1987, he moved to 1ZB radio in Auckland.

After 19 years, McNeil left radio behind in 1989 to join the new TV3 television channel, and worked there for over 20 years as a news journalist until his retirement aged 67 in 2010.

McNeil wrote an autobiography titled News Travels, published in 2014.

McNeil died after a long battle with Alzheimer’s disease on 29 December 2024, at the age of 82.

== See also ==
- List of New Zealand television personalities
