= Paul Henry (TV programme) =

- Genre: News & Entertainment
- Starring: Paul Henry; Ingrid Hipkiss; Jim Kayes; Verity Johnson
- Country of origin: New Zealand
- Original language: English

Production
- Executive producer: Sarah Bristow
- Production location: Auckland
- Camera setup: 6 multi-cam
- Running time: 3 hours
- Production company: Mediaworks New Zealand

Original release
- Network: Three
- Release: 7 April 2015 – 16 December 2016

Related
- Firstline; The AM Show

Paul Henry is a New Zealand morning news and talk show that aired weekdays on Three, and was simulcast on Radio Live. Its final lineup consisted of host Paul Henry, news anchor Ingrid Hipkiss, sports anchor Jim Kayes and social media anchor Verity Johnson.

The initial incarnation following Henry's move from TVNZ to MediaWorks was a late night news programme entitled The Paul Henry Show, which debuted on 27 January 2014 on Three, to replace the former late night news show Nightline. Mediaworks announced that the show was going to move into the morning timeslot in late 2014. It was replaced in its original timeslot by Newsworthy.

Paul Henry resigned from his morning programme in November 2016, with the final episode being aired on 16 December 2016. It was replaced by The AM Show in February 2017, hosted by Duncan Garner.

== Presenters ==
=== Anchors ===
Tenure	Presenter
7 April 2015 – 16 December 2016	Paul Henry

=== News anchor ===
Tenure	Presenter
7 April 2015 – 27 May 2016	Hilary Barry
30 May 2016 – 16 December 2016	Ingrid Hipkiss

=== Sports anchor ===
Tenure	Presenter
7 April 2015 – 16 December 2016	Jim Kayes

=== Social media presenter ===
Tenure	Presenter
7 April 2015 – 25 September 2015	Perlina Lau
28 September 2015 – 4 March 2016	Charlotte Ryan
7 March 2016 – 16 December 2016	Verity Johnson

== Backup presenters ==
=== Anchor ===
- Alison Mau
- Mark Sainsbury

=== Newsreader ===
- Judy Bailey
- Sacha McNeil
- Amanda Gillies

=== Sports anchor ===
- Jeff McTainsh
- Melodie Robinson

=== Social media presenter ===
- Aziz Al-Saafin
- Gracie Taylor

== History ==
=== The Paul Henry Show ===
The Paul Henry Show premiered on 27 January 2014 from 10:35 p.m. to 11:15 p.m. with Paul Henry as the show's host, and Janika ter Ellen as the news anchor, with Fiona McMillan as the show's executive producer. Labour Party leader David Cunliffe and Prime Minister John Key were both interviewed on the episode.

Henry kicked off the interview with Cunliffe by stating "I'd never vote for you", and teased Cunliffe on his misspelling of Lorde on Twitter, as Cunliffe spelt it as "Lord" when he tweeted congratulating her on her Grammy Awards. Key only managed to name three native New Zealand birds in the '9 in 10' challenge, where participants have to answer a question with 9 answers in 10 seconds. Henry asked Key to name native New Zealand birds, with Key naming tūī, kiwi, kākāpō, and "some kind of pigeon".

At the end of 2014 an announcement was made that Paul Henry will move to presenting a morning news show and as a result this marked the end for The Paul Henry Show. The final show aired on 19 December 2014. The replacement evening show called Newsworthy replaced the late night show.

=== Paul Henry ===
The new breakfast show presented by Paul Henry first aired 7 April 2015. The new breakfast show is broadcast live from a purpose-built hybrid radio/television studio at MediaWorks’ Flower Street offices. It replaced both Firstline on TV3 and the breakfast show on RadioLIVE. It's New Zealand's first cross-platformed show.

The morning show, entitled Paul Henry, is hosted by Paul Henry, Ingrid Hipkiss, Verity Johnson and Jim Kayes. The show covers local and international news, including sport, weather and much more. The show airs across TV3, RadioLIVE, mobile devices and the internet and is broadcast weekdays 6am-9am. On the first episode, Paul was joined by Prime Minister John Key, Kiwi musician Brooke Fraser and Rocket Lab founder Glenn Martin.

== Studio ==
Both versions of the show broadcast from TV3's Flower Street headquarters from studio 3 which was refitted between the late night show ending and the morning show beginning, the morning edition studio was designed by Jago Design who also designed the main Newshub studio in 2016, Studio 3 was home to Ice TV.
