= Belinda Todd =

New Zealand television presenter

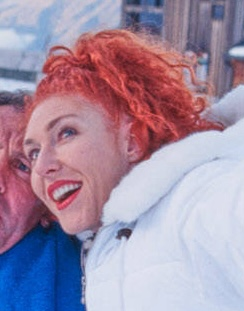
- Occupation: Screenwriter
- Employer: self employed

Belinda Todd is a New Zealand television broadcaster who rose to fame as a presenter on Nightline.

She grew up in Christchurch, and had ambitions to become a doctor. She joined the new TV3 network when it launched in 1989 as a weather presenter, and shortly after became known for her off-the-cuff contributions as co-presenter on Nightline.

She also was in Melody Rules, a short-lived sitcom that was critically panned.

In 1994, she left TV3 and subsequently worked for independent production company Communicado for 7 years. She departed New Zealand for Los Angeles in 2003, and has lived there since, working in several roles including production and freelance screenwriting.

She participated in the 20th anniversary episode of Nightline in 2010.

== See also ==
- List of New Zealand television personalities
