= Ok Goodnight =

American progressive rock/metal band

- Also known as: OKGN
- Origin: Boston, Massachusetts, U.S.
- Genres: Art rock; Progressive rock; Progressive metal; Math rock; Indie rock
- Years active: 2019–present
- Members: Casey Lee Williams; Martín de Lima; Augusto Bussio; Peter de Reyna
- Past members: Martin Gonzalez; Ron Bernhaut
- Website: okgoodnight.com

Ok Goodnight is an independent American art rock, progressive rock, and progressive metal band from Boston, Massachusetts.

== History ==
The band was founded while members were studying at the Berklee College of Music. Members Casey Lee Williams, Martin Gonzales, and Martín de Lima are well known for their work on the soundtrack of the animated web series RWBY.

In 2019, they released their first two singles, Rapture, and Think Again. Later that year, these two songs were included on their first album, Limbo. In 2020, they released an EP, Under the Veil. Both albums featured backing vocals by Elizabeth Hull. The song Awake from Under the Veil is featured in Volume 8 of RWBY.

In 2023, they released their second album The Fox and the Bird, which received recognition for its composition, creativity, and storytelling from critics. This featured guest vocals by Elizabeth Hull, including death growls. It also featured bassist Peter de Reyna of the symphonic metal band Seven Spires, similarly based in Boston, who then joined the band. That summer, they went on their first tour in North America.

In 2024, they went on their second North American tour. They played as the last day's opening band at the final Night of the Prog, at the Loreley Amphitheater in Sankt Goarshausen, Germany.

Their third album, stop/go, was released in 2026, featuring a more experimental style. They then played at the Midsummer Prog festival in Maastricht, Netherlands, and started their third North American tour.

== Band members ==
Current

- Casey Lee Williams – vocals
- Martín de Lima – piano/guitar
- Augusto Bussio – drums/guitar
- Peter de Reyna – bass

Former

- Martin Gonzalez – guitar
- Ron Bernhaut – bass
