= Suzanne Paul =

New Zealand television personality

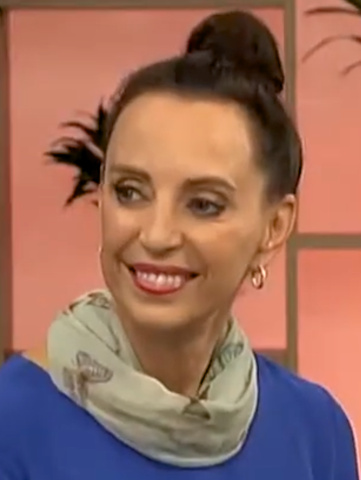
- Paul in 2017
- Born: Susan Barnes; November 16, 1956 (age 70); Wolverhampton, United Kingdom
- Other names: Suzanne Kilworth, Suzanne Wilson
- Spouses: Dean Kilworth (divorced); Duncan wilson (m. 2005; div. 2016); Patrick Kuhtze (m. 2022)

Suzanne Paul (born Susan Barnes, 16 November 1956) is an English-born New Zealand television personality and actress. She first gained fame for marketing Natural Glow makeup and appearing in infomercials in the 1990s, for which she was affectionately nicknamed the "infomercial queen".

In the late 1990s, Paul was the host of Guess Who’s Coming to Dinner? and Garage Sale. In the 2000s, she hosted Second Honeymoon, and had minor roles and cameos in Being Eve, Outrageous Fortune, and was a regular panellist on How's Life?. Paul's other acting credits include as Paloma in season 3 of My Life Is Murder in 2022, and performing on stage in two productions: Stepping Out in 2010 with the Auckland Theatre Company, and Dirty Dusting in 2011. Paul has also appeared in several reality shows as a contestant or guest, including Celebrity Treasure Island, Intrepid Journeys, and most notably as the winner of season 3 of Dancing with the Stars in 2007.

In addition to her work in entertainment, Paul also started her own clothing brand for short women in 2009, named "Suzanne Paul: Petite". She was formerly bankrupted in 2005, following the demise of Rawaka Māori Village, a controversial tourist business she had opened in 2004. However, she paid back a portion of the debt and sought early discharge, and returned to her work in products and sales to make a financial recovery. In 2008, she published her memoir, But Wait, There's More.

In 2025, Paul was awarded the Scroll of Honour from the Variety Artists Club of New Zealand for her contribution to New Zealand entertainment and support of charities.

== Early and personal life ==
Paul was born in Wolverhampton and grew up in the working class area of Whitmore Reans. She described her childhood as "very low-working class", saying her family home lacked an indoor toilet and hot water. Paul's mother left their family, and she was raised by her father, who worked long hours at a factory. As an older child, Paul earned pocket money helping clean tables in a local pub.

Paul has said she struggled at school due to dyscalculia and was expelled at age 15. She worked as a sales demonstrator for almost two decades in the United Kingdom. Originally intending to go to Australia, she relocated to New Zealand in 1991 after first visiting Auckland on a stopover.

Paul has been married three times. Her first marriage was to Dean Kilworth, whom she met when she was 40. Their marriage failed in part due to the stress of unsuccessful IVF treatments. In 2005, she married Duncan Wilson. They divorced in 2016 due to Wilson's struggle with Asperger syndrome. In March 2020, she became engaged to drummer Patrick Kuhtze. He had also been married twice before. The wedding was planned for October 2021, but was postponed due to the COVID-19 pandemic. They got married on 30 October 2022 and live together in Auckland.

In September 2021, Paul collapsed in her office while hosting a motivational talk via Zoom to an audience of 250 people. She spent two days in hospital and was diagnosed with low blood pressure, high cholesterol and a leaky heart valve. The incident caused false speculation about Paul's health online, including false rumours of a cancer diagnosis and COVID-19 complications.

== Career ==
=== Early career ===
Paul worked as a sales demonstrator in the UK for nearly two decades, where she developed her experience in sales and product promotion. She relocated to New Zealand in 1991 and began working as a presenter on infomercials. Paul became known for selling products such as Natural Glow makeup in 1992 (known for the catchphrase "thousands of luminous spheres"), the Massage Pillow and the Suzanne Clip. In 2022, online news website The Spinoff described her as "New Zealand's undisputed infomercial queen" who "has a knack for reinventing herself and popping up where we least expect her to".

In 1994, Paul released the novelty dance single "Blue Monkey", which entered at 41 on the New Zealand singles chart, remaining for one week. It was accompanied with a music video depicting Paul dancing at a club, inter-spliced with infomercial footage. In 1997, Paul released a cover of the single "Life Begins at 40" by Dave and the Dynamos.

=== Television and acting ===
In the late 90s, Paul presented various television programmes for TVNZ produced by Greenstone TV. She hosted Guess Who’s Coming to Dinner?, a 1998 show in which ordinary people cooked a meal in their home before the arrival of a surprise celebrity guest. She was also the host of Garage Sale, a show in which rooms were decorated with items bought at a garage sale, also featuring Anthony Ray Parker and designer Brett Schwieters; the series ran until 1999. In 2001, Paul presented Second Honeymoon alongside Parker and Cherie Penney, in which couples go on a second honeymoon.

In the 2000s, Paul appeared on numerous reality and comedy shows including City Celebrity Country Nobody, Celebrity Treasure Island (2003 and 2024), How's Life?, Intrepid Journeys, and Best Bits, among other shows. She also appeared on morning television including Good Morning and The Café. In 2007, Paul won season 3 of Dancing with the Stars with dance partner Stefano Olivier, despite breaking a rib in the final.

Paul has had small acting roles in television, both in character and as a cameo. She played Suzy Sonnenschein in season 2 of Being Eve, and appeared in season 5 of Outrageous Fortune. In 2022, she played a minor character named Paloma in My Life Is Murder. In 2010, she performed a rap song named "Stranger Danger" with rapper Scribe, as part of a comedy skit for The Jono Project. Paul has also appeared in stage productions; from July to August 2010, Paul had a starring role in the Auckland Theatre Company production of Stepping Out by Richard Harris. In 2011, she appeared in the show Dirty Dusting, which toured around New Zealand.

In 2021, Paul appeared as a guest in episode 5 of the first season of RuPaul's Drag Race Down Under. In 2025 she was awarded the Scroll of Honour from the Variety Artists Club of New Zealand for her contribution to New Zealand entertainment and support of charitable organisations.

=== Business ventures and other work ===
In April 2004, Paul opened Rawaka Māori Village, a tourist centre in Auckland, which she described as "cabaret meets kapa haka". The Rotorua Daily Post said the venture was shunned by some Māori who described it as "tiki tacky and culturally questionable". The venture closed in July 2004 and was put into voluntary liquidation, owning more than $1 million. A year later, Paul was declared bankrupt. She vowed to pay back her debts and sought early discharge from bankruptcy.

In September 2008, Paul published a memoir titled But Wait, There's More.

In August 2009, Paul launched her own clothing range named "Suzanne Paul: Petite", designed for women under 5 ft 4 inches in height.

== Filmography ==
=== Television ===
Year	Title	Role	Notes	Ref.
1989	Blind Date	Herself	Contestant (S01E03)	
1998	Guess Who’s Coming to Dinner?	Presenter		
1998–1999	Garage Sale	Presenter		
2001	Second Honeymoon	Presenter		
2001–2003	How's Life?	Herself	Regular panellist	
2002	Being Eve	Suzy Sonnenschein	"Being Reborn" (S02E08)	
2003	Celebrity Treasure Island	Herself	Season 2, eliminated in episode 4	
2004	City Celebrity Country Nobody	Herself	Season 1	
2009	Outrageous Fortune	Cameo	"What Company At What Expense?" (S05E05)	
2007	Intrepid Journeys	Herself	Season 5	
2007	Dancing with the Stars	Herself	Winner of season 3	
2008	The Sitting	Herself	Episode 14	
2010	The Jono Project	Cameo	"Stranger Danger" musical skit with Scribe	
2015	Good Morning	Herself	Final episode	
2018	Get It to Te Papa	Herself	Episode 4 and 5	
2019	Anika Moa Unleashed	Herself		
2020	Dog Almighty	Herself	S01E09	
2021	RuPaul’s Drag Race Down Under	Special guest	Episode 5	
2022	My Life Is Murder	Paloma		

=== Music videos ===
Year	Artist	Title	Role	Ref.
1994	Suzanne Paul	"Blue Monkey"	Singer / performer	
1998	Suzanne Paul	"Life Begins at 40"		
2015	Ron Cribb	"This Could Be The Night"	Cameo (as dancer)	
2018	JessB	"Set it Off"	Coach	

== Stage ==
Production	Dates	Role	Theatre	Ref.
Stepping Out	10 June - 3 July 2010	Vera	SkyCity Theatre, Auckland	
Dirty Dusting	29 April - 5 June 2011		Various	

== Discography ==
Title	Year	Peak chart positions
Title	Year	NZ
"Blue Monkey"	1994	41
"Life Begins at 40"	1997	

== See also ==
- List of New Zealand television personalities

Awards and achievements
Preceded by Lorraine Downes & Aaron Gilmore	Dancing with the Stars (New Zealand) winner (with partner Stefano Olivieri); Season 3 (2007)	Succeeded by Temepara George & Stefano Olivieri
