= Eric Young (broadcaster) =

New Zealand journalist and television presenter

- Born: Taranaki, New Zealand
- Education: St John's College, Hastings
- Occupation: Journalist

Eric Young is a New Zealand journalist and television presenter. He presented Prime News – First at 5:30 between March 2006 and July 2024.

Young's broadcasting career began on radio in Auckland in the early 1980s. After a seven-year diversion to the Auckland Star's sports department, Young returned to broadcasting with the launch of TV3 in 1989.

He has been the New Zealand Sports Writer of the Year and New Zealand Sports Broadcaster of the Year. In 2008 he was the Sports Journalist of the Year, largely for work done as editor of SKY Sport: The Magazine.

He began as a sports newsreader for Radio-i (Auckland, NZ) in 1981. Subsequently, he worked at the Auckland Star for six years as chief cricket and rugby league writer. Young has also worked for TVNZ, TV3, Optus Vision and ESPN Star Sports, as a sports commentator and news presenter.

== See also ==
- List of New Zealand television personalities
