= Julia Hartley Moore =

New Zealand female Private Investigator

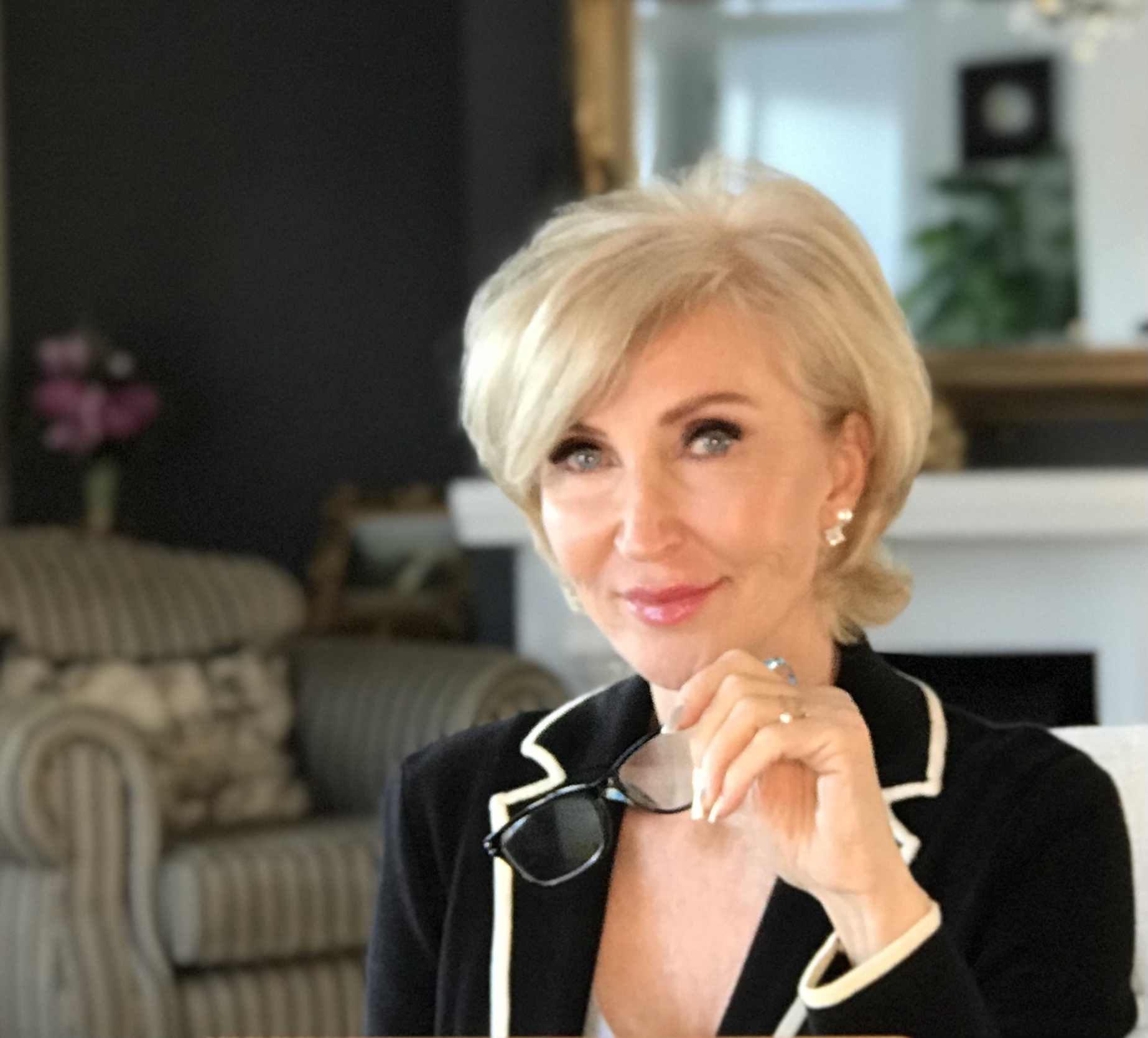
- Moore in 2020
- Occupations: Private investigator; Media commentator; Motivational speaker; Author
- Years active: 1996–present
- Known for: Work as Private investigator
- Website: juliahartleymoore.com

Julia Hartley Moore is a New Zealand private investigator, author and producer who is the founder of the Auckland-based private investigation firm, Julia Hartley Moore Limited (previously Arbeth & Co Limited). Her firm specialises in infidelity, scam, and child custody cases. She has published several books about her work as a private investigator, including multiple editions of Infidelity: Exploding the Myths.

== Personal life ==
Julia Hartley Moore is a native of New Zealand. She is a great-granddaughter of the Yorkshire poet John Hartley. Julia is dyslexic (a fact that was not discovered until she was aged 40) and left school at age 14. She had her first child at age 15 and married her first husband when she found out she was pregnant. When she was 16, Hartley Moore gave birth to twins. She met her second husband when she worked as a secretary with the National Party in her 20s.

Hartley Moore has married four times. She is currently married to television producer Steve Butler, whom she married in 2009.

== Career ==
In the 1990s when her children were grown, she moved to London where she worked a job at Harrods department store. In this role she helped uncover a staff theft ring. In 1996, Hartley Moore returned to New Zealand and opened her private investigation firm, Julia Hartley Moore Limited (formerly Arbeth & Co Limited). She was the first woman to own a private investigation company in New Zealand. She initially worked fraud cases for an insurance company, but soon began specialising in infidelity cases. She has also worked other types of cases involving scenarios like extortion, missing persons, and employee monitoring (among others). In 2000 she wrote her first book Julia Moore, PI, which was published by Penguin Books. In 2004, she authored Infidelity: Exploding the Myths, which was published by HarperCollins in which she documents her work investigating infidelity cases. Multiple editions of the latter book have since been released, including by Ulysses Press in 2006 and Exisle Publishing in 2011. This was followed up by Suddenly Single, which was published by HarperCollins in 2007.

Hartley Moore is a regular commentator on television and radio, appearing on TVNZ's 1News, TVNZ's current affairs programme Seven Sharp, and has been a panelist on Radio New Zealand's The Panel for over 20 years. In the 1990s she appeared on the television show Private Investigators. She was also a panelist for two series of TVNZ's chat show How's Life?. She has also appeared on Australian television's Channel 7.

In addition to television, Hartley Moore frequently appears in print and online news media publications such as Stuff Ltd and The New Zealand Herald to talk about aspects of her investigative work.

In 2021, Hartley Moore expanded into television production, founding her own production company Blonde Ambition Films Limited. The company’s first project, Polk: The Trial of Philip Polkinghorne, premiered on New Zealand’s Three network in 2025. It was subsequently released in the UK on Sky and in Australia in Channel 9. The documentary investigates the high-profile case of an eye surgeon accused of murdering his wife, exploring the complex legal and emotional dimensions of the trial.
