= Michael Campbell (pianist and author) =

American pianist, teacher and author (born 1945)

Michael Campbell (born 1945) is an American pianist, teacher and author. He has written two of the most widely-used college textbooks on the development of popular music, Popular Music in America (originally titled And the Beat Goes On, first published 1996) and Rock and Roll: an Introduction (written with James Brody, first published 1999).

== Biography ==
Campbell was born and grew up in and around San Francisco, California. He attended Amherst College until 1967, and, after graduating, served in the United States Naval Academy Band, where he began studying under Leon Fleisher. He continued studying with Fleisher at Peabody Conservatory, where he gained degrees in piano in 1972 and 1982. At the same time, he worked as a commercial musician with artists including Angela Lansbury, Ethel Merman, and Don McLean.

He began teaching at Western Illinois University in 1981, while continuing to perform around the U.S. and Canada. His repertoire includes both classical and 20th century popular music, including the music of Roger Sessions and transcriptions of jazz solos such as those of Art Tatum. He was clinician for G. Henle Verlag in the U.S., and a member of the Suzuki Association of the Americas, composing and arranging material for teaching.

His first textbook, And the Beat Goes On, was first published in 1996, and, retitled as Popular Music in America, has gone through several editions and has been described as "the first text to offer a comprehensive account of two centuries of popular music". He also wrote, with James Brody, Rock and Roll: an Introduction, first published in 1999; and Music, first published in 2011.

As professor at Western Illinois University, Campbell taught courses in popular music, jazz improvisation, and American music. He retired in 2003. After moving to Westerly, Rhode Island, he taught an online rock music course at Arizona State University. He has also given presentations on "The Golden Age of the Piano", playing excerpts from all varieties of piano music that would have been heard in the early 20th century.
