= Nightline (New Zealand TV programme) =

New Zealand late night television news programme

- Presented by: Joanna Paul-Robie (1990–1991); Belinda Todd (1990–1992); Neil Waka (1992–1994); Janet Wilson (1993–1994); Leanne Malcolm (1995–1998); Darren McDonald (1998-2002); Carolyn Robinson (1999–2004); Carly Flynn (2005–2007); Samantha Hayes (2007–2009); Rachel Smalley (2010–2011); Sacha McNeil (2011–2013)
- Country of origin: New Zealand

Production
- Running time: 30 minutes

Original release
- Network: TV3
- Release: 19 February 1990 – 20 December 2013

Related
- The Paul Henry Show

Nightline was a New Zealand late night news programme that premiered on TV3 on 19 February 1990. Its final host was Sacha McNeil, and Nightline ceased to air in December 2013, replaced by controversial broadcaster Paul Henry's new programme The Paul Henry Show in early 2014, and then in 2015 by a new late night news bulletin programme called Newsworthy with Samantha Hayes and David Farrier at the desk. This was replaced in 2016 by Newshub Late.

== Format ==
Screening Mondays to Fridays at around 10.30pm (subject to scheduling), Nightline was TV3's late night news programme and provided its viewers with a wrap-up of the day's big news stories, along with breaking news from New Zealand and around the world – all of which were drawn on the resources of the 3 News newsroom. The entertainment content blended arts and culture, plus interviews and profiles with public figures from New Zealand.

Nightline began life in November 1989 as an extended, three-minute newsbreak at around 10.30pm when TV3 began broadcasting. It later became a half hour, late night bulletin under its producer, Susan Baldacci, and the first full-length edition of Nightline was broadcast at 10.30pm on the evening of Monday 19 February 1990. A wrap of the day's news was read by Joanna Paul-Robie, with Belinda Todd presenting a not-so-serious look at the day's events through off-the-wall entertainment. The programme's contributor was Bill Ralston, TV3's political editor at the time.

When Joanna Paul-Robie left TV3 at the end of 1991 to join TVNZ, Neil Waka took over as Nightline's newsreader in 1992. Belinda Todd left at the end of that year.

Successive presenters, from 1993 until Nightline ended in 2013, have included Janet Wilson (1993–94), Leanne Malcolm (1995–98), Darren McDonald (1998-2003), Carolyn Robinson (1999–2004), Carly Flynn (2005–2007), Samantha Hayes (2007–2009), Rachel Smalley (2010–2011) and Sacha McNeil (2011–2013).

A 20th anniversary episode was aired in 2010.

== Cancellation ==
In early 2014, MediaWorks confirmed that The Paul Henry Show would replace Nightline. A release from MediaWorks said: "The Nightline brand remains a valued part of the 3 News stable and will sit in reserve." According to Rachel Lorimer, MediaWorks' group communication manager for news and current affairs at the time, this meant, "that the [Nightline] brand will be available for use in future years."

Over the last few years the programme had struggled to maintain its viewership, and MediaWorks felt that it was time for change. According to Nielsen, the programme's average audience per episode declined by 29% over the last five years of its life, with viewers dropping from 155,000 in 2009 to 110,000 in 2013.

In the release, Mark Jennings, MediaWorks' director of news and current affairs at the time, said, "Nightline has been a great programme for us over many years and produced some of our best broadcasters, but the landscape is due for change and Paul Henry will lead that change in later evening viewing."

TV3 cancelled The Paul Henry Show at the end of 2014 and broadcast a temporary bulletin in the slot known as 3 News Late Edition with rotating anchors hosting. News programme Newsworthy was broadcast from 8 June 2015 to 18 December 2015. It was officially replaced on 1 February 2016 with Newshub Late hosted by Samantha Hayes.
