= Rachel Smalley =

New Zealand television presenter

Rachel Smalley MNZM
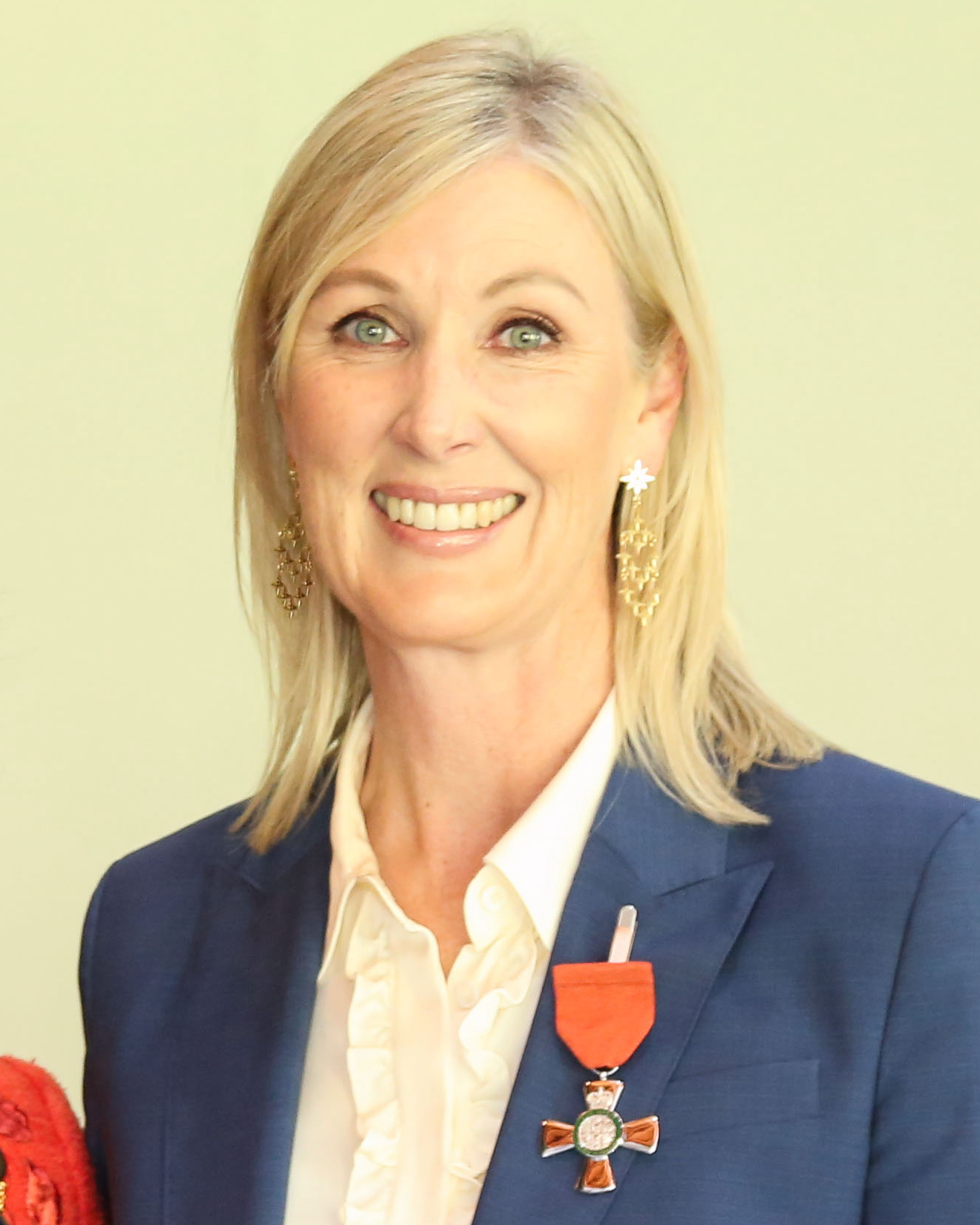
- Smalley in 2024
- Occupation: Broadcaster

Rachel Jane Smalley MNZM is a New Zealand television and radio journalist and presenter. From 2013 to 2017 she hosted Early Edition every weekday morning on Newstalk ZB and wrote regular columns for The New Zealand Herald.

== Early life ==
Smalley grew up in rural Canterbury and received her secondary education from Lincoln High School, where she graduated in 1988 (sixth form).

== Career ==
After graduating from Wellington Polytechnic, Smalley began her career in radio journalism with Newstalk ZB before moving to TV3. Smalley moved to the UK and worked for Sky News. She later became the MediaWorks Europe correspondent for a time before returning to New Zealand to host TV3's Nightline. In 2011 Smalley began fronting the station's breakfast programme Firstline. She also hosted weekly politics and current affairs programme The Nation. In 2013 Smalley began hosting early morning radio programme Early Edition on Newstalk ZB, airing weekdays 5am-6am. In 2014 Smalley joined TVNZ's Q + A team on TV One.

On 13 October 2017, Smalley announced her departure from Newstalk ZB and her 20-year journalism career. Her final Early Edition show was broadcast on 15 December 2017.

She later worked at radio station Today FM, until it closed down in March 2023.

In the 2024 King's Birthday Honours, Smalley was appointed a Member of the New Zealand Order of Merit, for services to broadcasting and health advocacy.

== See also ==
- List of New Zealand television personalities
