= Firstline =

- Genre: News
- Presented by: Sacha McNeil and Michael Wilson
- Country of origin: New Zealand
- Original language: English

Production
- Running time: 150 minutes

Original release
- Network: TV3
- Release: 7 March 2011 – 2 April 2015

Firstline is a New Zealand morning news programme produced by 3 News, the news division of TV3. The show was cancelled in April 2015 and was replaced by Paul Henry, a new multi-platform show with Paul Henry at the helm.

The two-and-a-half-hour programme, designed to compete with TVNZ's Breakfast, first went to air on 7 March 2011. It was hosted by Rachel Smalley until mid-2013, after which the host's seat rotated amongst other 3 News presenters. From January 2014, Sacha McNeil and Michael Wilson presented the show. Sports news was presented by Sam Ackerman. Firstline features regular technology segments including Tech Bytes on Thursdays, and commentary by Steve Simms, Paul Spain or Ben Gracewood on Mondays.

Unlike most other morning news services at the time, Firstline was solely a news show and did not include magazine or lifestyle segments, instead chose to focus on recent current events, with reports from 3 News reporters and live or pre-recorded interviews.
