= Art rock =

Subgenre of rock music

- Other names: Progressive rock
- Stylistic origins: Experimental rock; avant-garde; psychedelic rock; folk; jazz; classical
- Cultural origins: 1960s, United States and United Kingdom
- Derivative forms: Post-progressive; post-punk; new wave

Other topics
- Art music; art pop; art punk; serious music

Art rock is rock music that aims to distinguish the genre from popular entertainment, with the term typically being applied as the middle ground between mainstream and experimental rock. Art rock primarily draws influences from the wider art world and academia; which includes contemporary art, art music, avant-garde art, experimental music, avant-garde music, alongside classical music and jazz. The term is sometimes deployed interchangeably with "progressive rock" and to refer to some experimental rock acts.

Critics have defined art rock as a "rejection" of rock music intended solely for the purpose of popular entertainment or dancing. The term was closely associated with a specific period beginning over 1966 and 1967. Its usage waned after the late-1970s while elements of the style were infused into various popular music genres through the 1990s.

== Etymology and characteristics ==
In the academic perspective of music critics, such as those for The New York Times, high art and pop music had increasingly engaged with each other throughout the second half of the 20th century. Historically, the term has been used to describe at least two related, but distinct, types of rock music. One usage refers to groups who rejected psychedelia and the hippie counterculture in favour of a modernist, avant-garde approach defined by the Velvet Underground. Essayist Ellen Willis compared these two types:

From the early sixties ... there was a counter-tradition in rock and roll that had much more in common with high art—in particular avant-garde art—than the ballyhooed art-rock synthesis [progressive rock]; it involved more or less consciously using the basic formal canons of rock and roll as material (much as pop artists used mass art in general) and refining, elaborating, playing off that material to produce ... rockand-roll art. While art rock was implicitly based on the claim that rock and roll was or could be as worthy as more established art forms, rock-and-roll art came out of an obsessive commitment to the language of rock and roll and an equally obsessive disdain for those who rejected that language or wanted it watered down, made easier ... the new wave has inherited the counter-tradition.

Art rock frequently intertwines with "serious music". Critic John Rockwell described the term as referring to wide-ranging and eclectic tendencies in rock music. The Encyclopedia Britannica states that "art rock" was frequently applied to strains of experimental rock music, including work by Laurie Anderson, David Bowie, Brian Eno, the Velvet Underground, and Frank Zappa. In the rock music of the 1970s, the application of the "art" descriptor by music critics and journalists was taken derogatorily, understood by musicians and fans as meaning that it was "aggressively avant-garde" or "pretentiously progressive". According to AllMusic, art rock is "more challenging, noisy and unconventional" and "less classically influenced", with more of an emphasis on avant-garde music, depending on what was considered avant-garde at the time of the term's use.

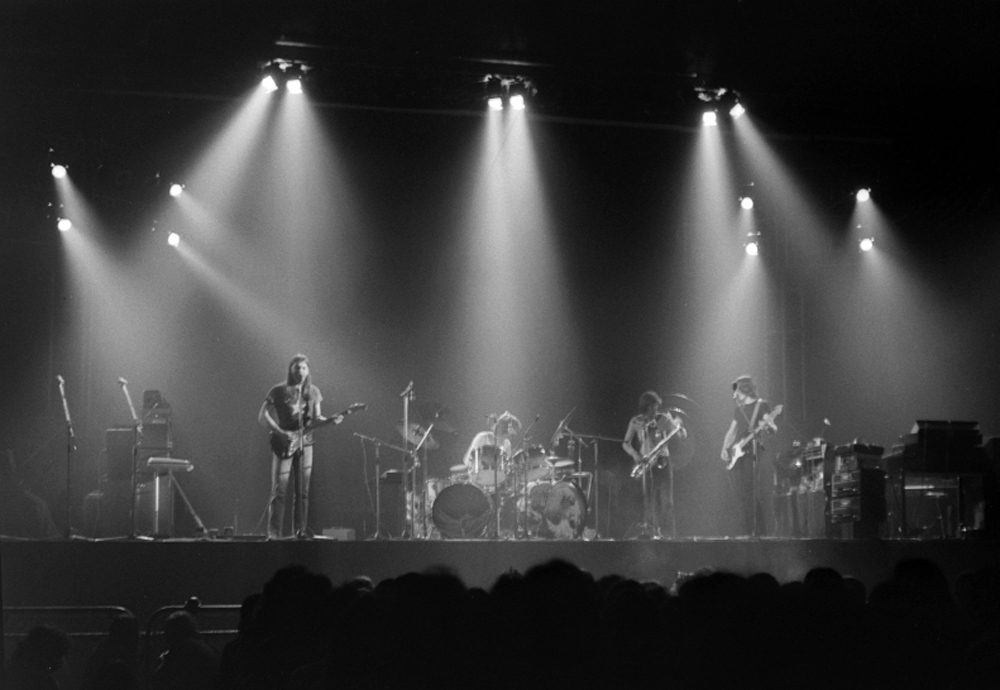
Pink Floyd performing their concept album The Dark Side of the Moon (1973)

"Art rock" is used synonymously with progressive rock and the two terms are sometimes deployed interchangeably. They both describe a mostly British attempt to elevate rock music to new levels of artistic credibility, and became the instrumental analogue to concept albums and rock operas, which were typically more vocal oriented. Art rock can also refer to either classically driven rock, or to a progressive rock-folk fusion. Authors Simon Frith and Howard Horne describe it as emphasizing Romantic and autonomous traditions, in distinction to the aesthetic of the everyday and the disposable embodied by art pop. Larry Starr and Christopher Waterman's American Popular Music defines art rock as a "form of rock music that blended elements of rock and European classical music", citing the English progressive rock bands King Crimson, Emerson, Lake & Palmer, and Pink Floyd as examples.

Common characteristics include album-oriented music divided into compositions rather than songs, with usually complicated and long instrumental sections and symphonic orchestration. Its music was traditionally used within the context of concept records, and its lyrical themes tended to be "imaginative" and politically oriented. Bruce Eder's essay The Early History of Art-Rock/Prog Rock states that "'progressive rock,' also sometimes known as 'art rock,' or 'classical rock'" is music in which the "bands [are] playing suites, not songs; borrowing riffs from Bach, Beethoven, and Wagner instead of Chuck Berry and Bo Diddley; and using language closer to William Blake or T. S. Eliot than to Carl Perkins or Willie Dixon."

== History ==
=== 1960s: Origins ===
In the late sixties and early seventies, rock both co-opted and challenged the prevailing view of musical art, often at the same time. This is evident in a diverse body of music that includes the Beach Boys' Pet Sounds and the Beatles' Sgt. Pepper; Frank Zappa's Freak Out ... the Who's rock opera Tommy; Pink Floyd's technologically advanced concept album Dark Side of the Moon; and Miles Davis's jazz/rock fusion.

— Michael Campbell, Popular Music in America, 2012

The earliest figure of art rock has been assumed to be record producer and songwriter Phil Spector, who became known as an auteur for his Wall of Sound productions that aspired to a "classical grandiosity". According to biographer Richard Williams, Spector transformed rock music from a performing art into an art that could only exist in the recording studio, which "paved the way for art rock". The Beach Boys' leader Brian Wilson is cited by biographer Peter Ames Carlin as the forerunner of "a new kind of art-rock that would combine the transcendent possibilities of art with the mainstream accessibility of pop music". Critic Stephen Holden says that mid-1960s recordings by the Beatles, Spector and Wilson are often identified as marking the start of art pop, which preceded the "bombastic, classically inflected" art rock that started in the late 1960s. Writing in 1972, music journalist Nat Freedland of Billboard magazine, stated "during the golden period of the mid '60s, Bob Dylan and the Beatles led the way to an expansion of rock into an area of art songs with a beat".

Many of the top British groups during the 1960s and 1970s – including members of the Beatles, the Rolling Stones, the Kinks, the Who, 10cc, the Move, the Yardbirds and Pink Floyd – came to music via art school. This institution differed from its US counterpart in terms of having a less industry-applicable syllabus and in its focus on furthering eccentric talent. By the mid-1960s, several of these acts espoused an approach based on art and originality, where previously they had been absorbed solely in authentic interpretation of US-derived musical styles, such as rock 'n' roll and R&B.

==== Influential albums ====
The December 1965 release of the Beatles' Rubber Soul has been regarded as signifying a watershed for the form of the pop album. The album garnered recognition for the Beatles as artists from the American mainstream press due to the use of unconventional studio techniques and instruments which were not popular in rock music at the time. Writing in 1968, Gene Sculatti of Jazz & Pop recognised Rubber Soul as "the definitive 'rock as art' album" and "the necessary prototype" that major artists such as the Rolling Stones (with Aftermath) and the Beach Boys had felt compelled to follow. According to Bandcamp Daily, the record was "one of the premier art rock albums".

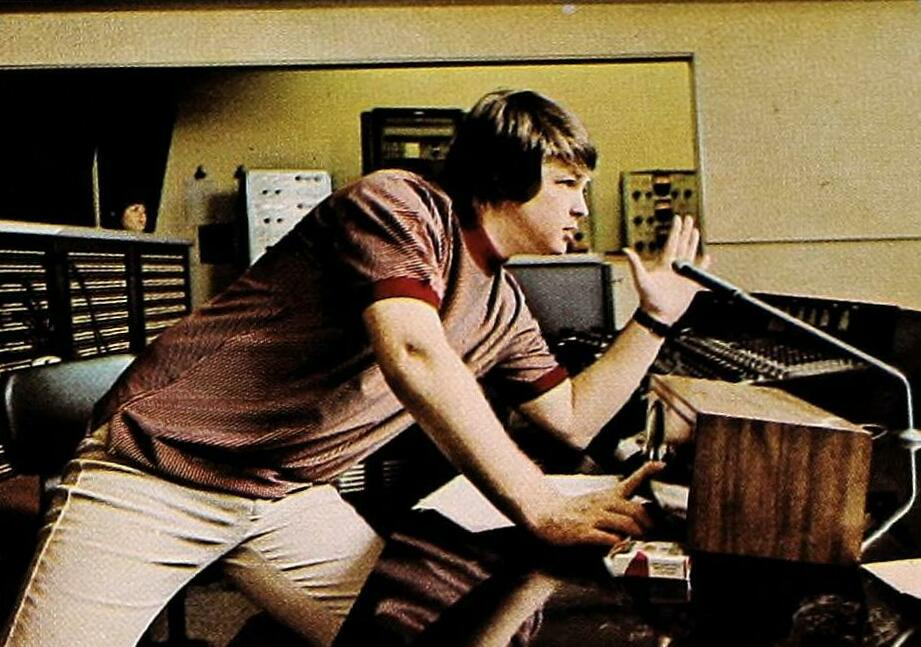
Brian Wilson recording Pet Sounds in the studio, 1966

The period when rock music became most closely aligned with the contemporary art world began in 1966 and continued until the mid-1970s. Academic Michael Johnson associates "the first documented moments of ascension in rock music" to the Beach Boys' Pet Sounds (May 1966). Biographer David Leaf wrote that the album heralded art rock, while Cue magazine described the Beach Boys as having been "among the vanguard" with regard to art rock, among many other aspects relating to the counterculture through late 1967.

Jacqueline Edmondson's 2013 encyclopaedia Music in American Life states that, although it was preceded by earlier examples, Frank Zappa and the Mothers of Invention's debut album Freak Out! (June 1966) came to be seen as "the first successful incorporation of art music in a pop context". With Los Angeles as his base since the early 1960s, Zappa was able to work in an environment where student radicalism was closely aligned with an active avant-garde scene, a setting that placed the city ahead of other countercultural centres at the time and would continue to inform his music.

By August 1966, the Beatles' Revolver furthered the rock album-as-art perspective and continued pop music's evolution. It expanded the genre's scope in terms of the range of musical styles, which included Indian, avant-garde and classical, and the lyrical content of the album, and also in its departure from previous notions of melody and structure in pop songwriting. As with Rubber Soul, the album inspired many of the progressive rock artists of the 1970s, and each of its songs has been recognised as anticipating a new subgenre or style.

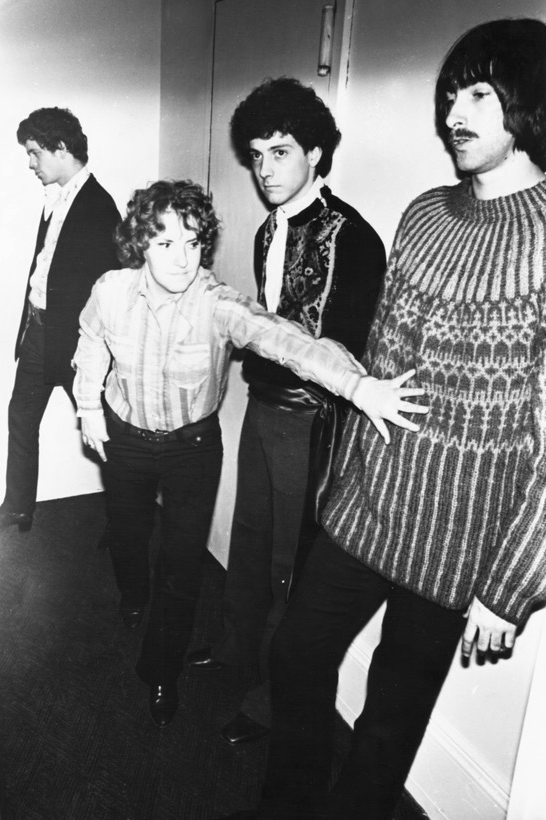
The Velvet Underground, 1968

Author Matthew Bannister traces "the more self-conscious, camp aesthetic of art rock" to pop artist Andy Warhol and the Velvet Underground, who emulated Warhol's art/pop synthesis. Accordingly, "Warhol took Spector's combination of the disembodiment, 'distance' and refinement of high culture with the 'immediacy' of mass cultural forms like rock and roll several stages further ... But Warhol's aesthetic was more thoroughly worked out than Spector's, which represented a transitional phase between old-fashioned auteurism and the thoroughly postmodern, detached tenets of pop art. ... Warhol's approach reverberates throughout art rock, most obviously in his stance of distance and disengagement." Clash Music names the Velvet Underground's debut March 1967 album The Velvet Underground & Nico "the original art-rock record". Bannister writes of the Velvet Underground: "no other band exerted the same grip on the minds of 1970s/1980s art/alternative rock artists, writers and audiences." Their influence would recur from the 1970s onwards to various worldwide indie scenes and "nearly every sub-variety of avant-garde rock, from 70s art-rock to no-wave, new-wave, and punk", according to the Library of Congress' National Recording Registry.

AllMusic states that the first wave of art rock musicians were inspired by the Beatles' Sgt. Pepper's Lonely Hearts Club Band (May 1967) and believed that for rock music to grow artistically, they should incorporate elements of European and classical music to the genre. Many British groups flowered in the album's wake; those who are listed in Music in American Life include the Moody Blues, the Strawbs, Genesis, and "most notably", Pink Floyd.

=== 1970s ===
English band Roxy Music have been credited as "art rock pioneers". British newspaper The Economist labeled Roxy Music "the best art-rock band since the Beatles". Adding that, "They are, quite simply, the greatest art-rock group Britain has produced this side of the Beatles."

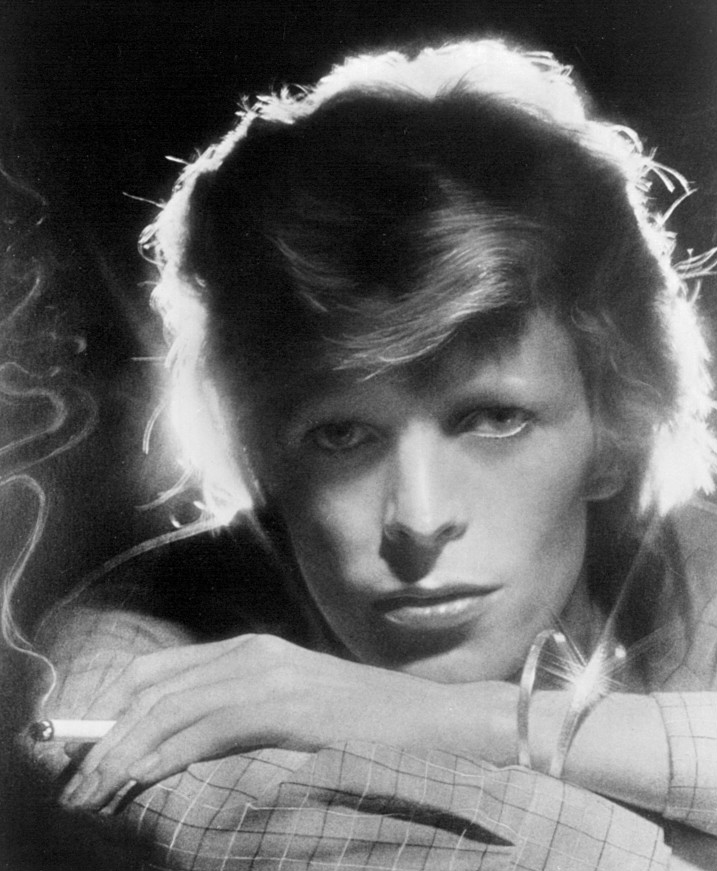
David Bowie photographed in 1974

Enthusiasm for usage of the term in music criticism and journalism waned in the mid-1970s. From then to the 1990s, art rock was infused within various popular music genres. Encyclopædia Britannica states that its genre's tendencies were continued by some British and American hard rock and pop rock artists, and that Brian Eno's late 1970s and early 1980s collaborations with David Bowie and Talking Heads are exemplary of "the successful infusion of art rock tendencies into other popular music genres". Bowie and Eno collaborated on a series of consecutive albums called the "Berlin Trilogy", characterised as an "art rock trifecta" by Consequence of Sound, who noted that at the time of their release, "The experimental records weren't connecting with audiences on the scale Bowie was used to... New Wave had exploded, and a generation of Bowie descendants had taken the stage."

According to Pitchfork, Television's debut album Marquee Moon (1977) "harnessed the energy you associate with punk, even as they crossed it with art-rock and the poetic urges of frontman Tom Verlaine". According to Bandcamp Daily, Cleveland band Pere Ubu were "the pinnacle of American art rock", stating that "art rock is an ideal American language because it's highbrow content in lowbrow language, and no one gets the balance better than this band."

=== 1980s–1990s ===
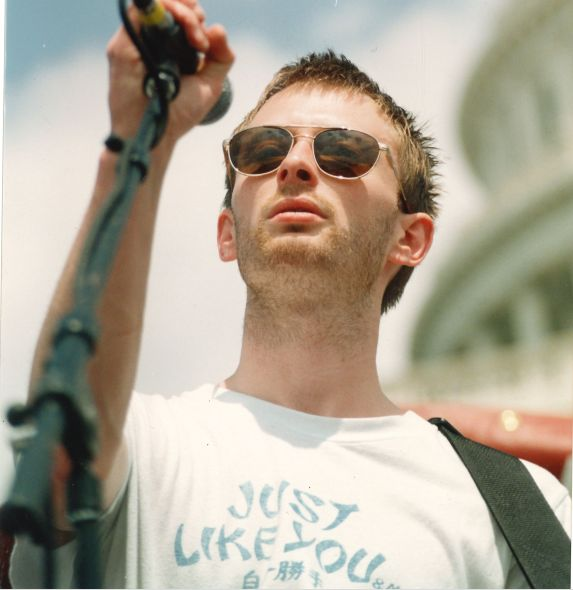
Thom Yorke performing with Radiohead in 1998

During the 1980s, Talk Talk was described as "art-rock pioneers" by the Quietus. At the time, many of the original art rock artists of the 1970s had abandoned their experimental sound. Writing in 1981, journalist Roy Trakin stated: "Of course, these stalwarts can still fill Madison Square Garden and sell a great many records, as they always have, but their days of adventurous risk-taking and musical innovation are long gone – replaced by the smug satisfaction of commercial success."

During the 1990s, according to The Guardian, Radiohead's 1995 album The Bends "was the point when Radiohead went from being a mid-level alt-rock band to an art-rock band". In 1997, Radiohead released the album OK Computer, which has been labeled an "art rock" album. However, the band rejected links to art rock, despite comparisons to Pink Floyd's 1973 album The Dark Side of the Moon. Robert Christgau from The Village Voice said Radiohead immersed lead singer Thom Yorke's vocals in "enough electronic marginal distinction to feed a coal town for a month" to compensate for the "soulless" songs, resulting in "arid" art rock.

=== 2000s–2020s ===
In the 2000s, art rock continued to evolve as a new generation of artists drew on the genre's traditions while incorporating elements of electronic music, noise rock, and post-punk. American band Deerhunter, led by Bradford Cox, were noted for their combination of ambient textures and guitar-driven experimentation, with The Guardian describing them as part of a broader art rock resurgence in the late 2000s. Animal Collective similarly gained attention for their eclectic approach to songwriting, blending psychedelia, electronics, and folk traditions in a manner that critics frequently associated with the art rock lineage.

In 2007, NPR described Arcade Fire as an "art-rock outfit".

In 2013, in a Pitchfork review of American rock duo MGMT's album MGMT, writer Ian Cohen stated the band released "fluke hits" which allowed them to "become stealth operatives for uncompromising art-rock in the compromised major label system."

St. Vincent, the project of multi-instrumentalist Annie Clark, became one of the most prominent art rock artists of the 2010s. Her self-titled 2014 album St. Vincent received widespread critical acclaim, with NME calling it a landmark of modern art rock that combined angular guitar work with electronic production and art pop sensibilities.

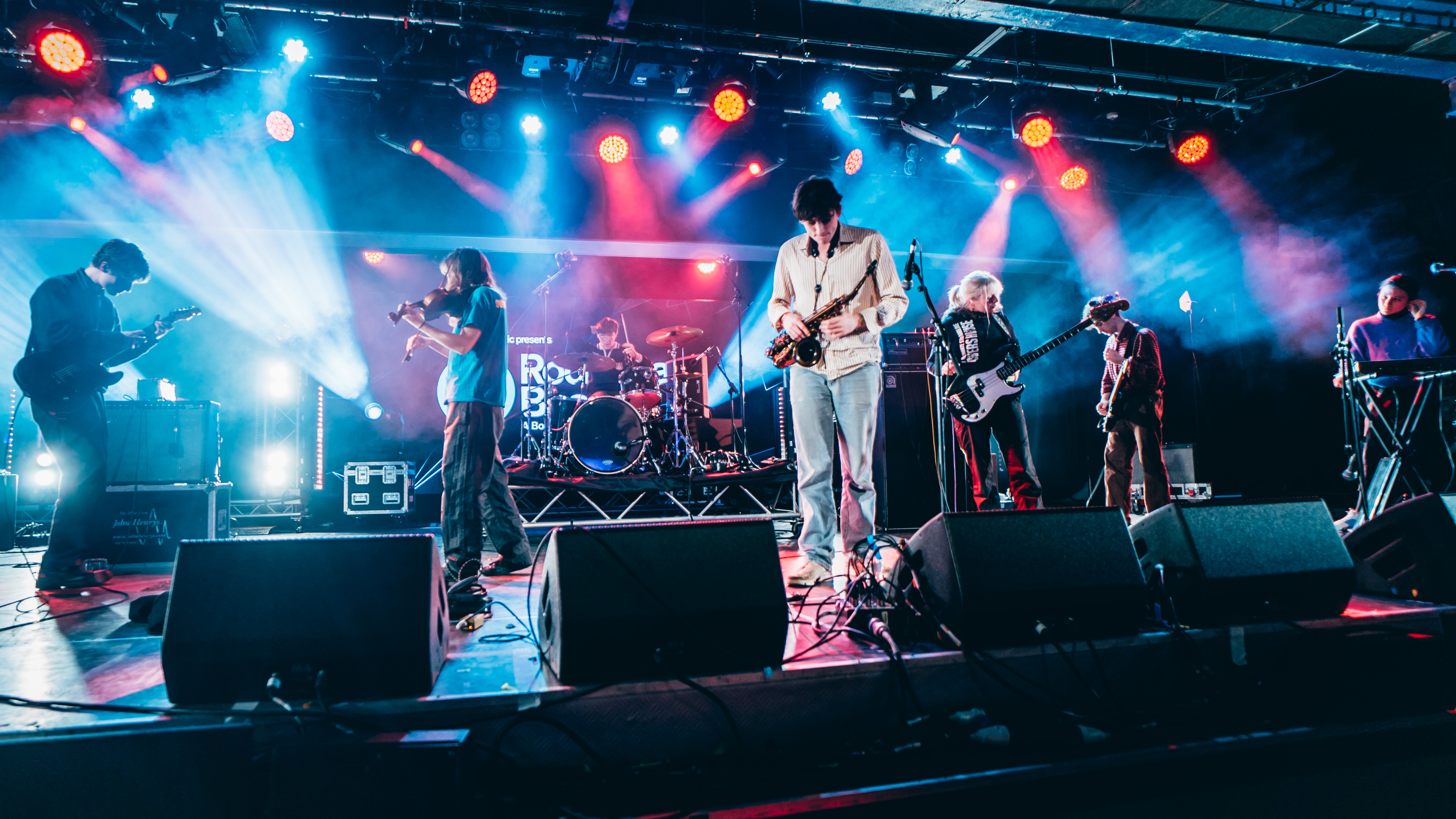
Black Country, New Road performing in January 2020

In the late 2010s and early 2020s, the Windmill scene in Brixton, South London, became a focal point for a new wave of art rock. Centered around the Windmill venue, bands such as black midi, Squid, and Black Country, New Road developed a distinctive sound characterized by complex time signatures, abrasive textures, and genre-defying compositions. The English group Black Country, New Road have been described as an "art-rock collective" by the BBC. Varsity writers Anuk Weerawardana and Wilf Vall cited their 2022 album Ants from Up There as "art rock meets chamber pop". Black midi's debut album Schlagenheim (2019) was described by The Quietus as a landmark of the post-punk and art rock revival.

In 2026, Bandcamp Daily stated that art rock has "never been frozen in time", with brand new artists evolving the genre "with every generation".

== See also ==
- List of art rock musicians
- Postmodern music

== Bibliography ==
- Bannister, Matthew (2007). White Boys, White Noise: Masculinities and 1980s Indie Guitar Rock. Ashgate Publishing, Ltd. ISBN 978-0-7546-8803-7.
- Campbell, Michael (2012). Popular Music in America:The Beat Goes On. Cengage Learning. ISBN 978-1-133-71260-2.
- Edmondson, Jacqueline, ed. (2013). Music in American Life: An Encyclopedia of the Songs, Styles, Stars, and Stories that Shaped our Culture. ABC-CLIO. ISBN 978-0-313-39348-8.
- Everett, Walter (1999). The Beatles as Musicians: Revolver Through the Anthology. New York, NY: Oxford University Press. ISBN 978-0-19-512941-0.
- Frith, Simon (1989). Facing the Music: A Pantheon Guide to Popular Culture. London: Pantheon Books. ISBN 0-394-55849-9.
- Frith, Simon; Horne, Howard (2016) [1988]. Art Into Pop. Routledge. ISBN 978-1-317-22803-5.
- Frontani, Michael R. (2007). The Beatles: Image and the Media. Jackson, MS: University Press of Mississippi. ISBN 978-1-57806-966-8.
- Greene, Doyle (2016). Rock, Counterculture and the Avant-Garde, 1966–1970: How the Beatles, Frank Zappa and the Velvet Underground Defined an Era. Jefferson, NC: McFarland. ISBN 978-1-4766-6214-5.
- Hegarty, Paul; Halliwell, Martin (2011), Beyond and Before: Progressive Rock Since the 1960s, New York: The Continuum International Publishing Group, ISBN 978-0-8264-2332-0
- Howard, David N. (2004). Sonic Alchemy: Visionary Music Producers and Their Maverick Recordings. Milwaukee, WI: Hal Leonard. ISBN 0-634-05560-7.
- Jones, Carys Wyn (2008). The Rock Canon: Canonical Values in the Reception of Rock Albums. Ashgate Publishing, Ltd. ISBN 978-0-7546-6244-0.
- Johnson, Michael (2009). Pop Music Theory: Harmony, Form, and Composition (2nd ed.). Boston, Mass.: Cinemasonique Music. ISBN 978-0-578-03539-0.
- Julien, Oliver (2008). Julien, Olivier (ed.). Sgt. Pepper and the Beatles: It Was Forty Years Ago Today. Ashgate. ISBN 978-0-7546-6708-7.
- Kent, Nick (2009). "The Last Beach Movie Revisited: The Life of Brian Wilson". The Dark Stuff: Selected Writings on Rock Music. Da Capo Press. ISBN 9780786730742.
- Leaf, David (1985). The Beach Boys. Courage Books. ISBN 978-0-89471-412-2.
- Lindberg, Ulf; Guomundsson, Gestur; Michelsen, Morten; Weisethaunet, Hans (2005). Rock Criticism from the Beginning: Amusers, Bruisers, and Cool-Headed Cruisers. New York, NY: Peter Lang. ISBN 978-0-8204-7490-8.
- MacDonald, Ian (1998). Revolution in the Head: The Beatles' Records and the Sixties. London: Pimlico. ISBN 978-0-7126-6697-8.
- Moon, Tom (2008). 1,000 Recordings to Hear Before You Die. Workman Publishing. ISBN 978-0-7611-3963-8.
- Perone, James E. (2004). Music of the Counterculture Era. Westport, CT: Greenwood Press. ISBN 0-313-32689-4.
- Reynolds, Simon (2005). Rip it Up and Start Again: Postpunk 1978-1984. Penguin Books. ISBN 978-0-14-303672-2.
- Rodriguez, Robert (2012). Revolver: How the Beatles Reimagined Rock 'n' Roll. Milwaukee, WI: Backbeat Books. ISBN 978-1-61713-009-0.
- Rosenberg, Stuart (2009). Rock and Roll and the American Landscape: The Birth of an Industry and the Expansion of the Popular Culture, 1955-1969. iUniverse. ISBN 978-1-4401-6458-3.
- Schinder, Scott (2007). "The Beach Boys". In Schinder, Scott; Schwartz, Andy (eds.). Icons of Rock: An Encyclopedia of the Legends Who Changed Music Forever. Westport, Connecticut: Greenwood Press. ISBN 978-0313338458.
- Spitz, Bob (2005). The Beatles: The Biography. New York, NY: Little, Brown and Company. ISBN 1-84513-160-6.
- Unterberger, Richie (2009). White Light/White Heat: The Velvet Underground Day by Day. Jawbone. ISBN 978-1-906002-22-0.
- Williams, Richard (2003). Phil Spector: Out of His Head. Music Sales Group. ISBN 978-0-7119-9864-3.
- Lonkin, Claudia (2024). Neue Deutsche Welle (Kindle ed.). Bloomsbury Academic. ISBN 979-8765103340.
