= Bravo (New Zealand) =

- Country: New Zealand

Programming
- Picture format: 576i SDTV
- Timeshift service: Bravo Plus 1

Ownership
- Owner: NBCUniversal International Networks (managed by Sky Network Television)
- Sister channels: Eden; HGTV; Rush; Sky Open; Three; Universal TV

History
- Launched: 3 July 2016
- Replaced: Four

Availability

Terrestrial
- Freeview: 4

Bravo is a New Zealand television channel owned by NBCUniversal International Networks. It is broadcast via the state-owned Kordia transmission network, Sky and on the streaming service ThreeNow. The channel launched on 3 July 2016, replacing Four. Much like its American cable network counterpart, Bravo focuses on design, food, glamour and pop culture.

== History ==
The channel was announced by Mediaworks on 2 May 2016. The goal of the channel was to increase the amount of reality shows available on free-to-air television in New Zealand, and boosting production of such formats in the country, as New Zealand had "very low" airtime for reality formats, and filling in a gap for female audiences, in a market where subscription television was decreasing, favouring Freeview. The channel scheduled its first original production, The Real Housewives of Auckland, for August 2016.

Bravo launched on 3 July 2016. Following the closure of Four, a one and a half minute promotion aired, previewing the content to be expected on Bravo. The first show to be broadcast on Bravo was Top Chef, at 5:10 am.

Launch ratings exceeded all expectations; attracting a cumulative audience of 1,238,900 viewers in its launch week, compared to Four, whose ratings began to fall in 2014.

On 1 May 2017, Bravo adopted a new black logo to match its U.S counterpart, which had rebranded to that same logo three months earlier.

In April 2018, MediaWorks revealed that it had no plans to renew its hit local title, The Real Housewives of Auckland, for a second season.

In early September 2020, MediaWorks confirmed that it would be selling its television media assets, which include Bravo, to the US mass media multinational company Discovery, Inc.

On 1 December 2020, Discovery, Inc completed the acquisition of MediaWorks TV Limited. This acquisition also includes sister channels The Edge TV, The Breeze TV and Three, and news service Newshub.

On 10 December 2024, Warner Bros. Discovery New Zealand sold their stake in the joint venture. NBCUniversal International Networks is now the sole owner of the channel. Bravo content is still available on Warner Bros. Discovery's ThreeNow through a renewed partnership created between the two companies.

On 22 July 2025, Warner Bros. confirmed it would be selling its New Zealand free-to-air television assets (Bravo, Three, Eden, Rush and HGTV) and streaming operations (ThreeNow) to Sky for NZ$1. The sale completed on 1 August 2025, with Warner Bros. Discovery continuing to provide channels a continued supply of company's content under a multi-year commercial agreement.

== Bravo Plus 1 ==
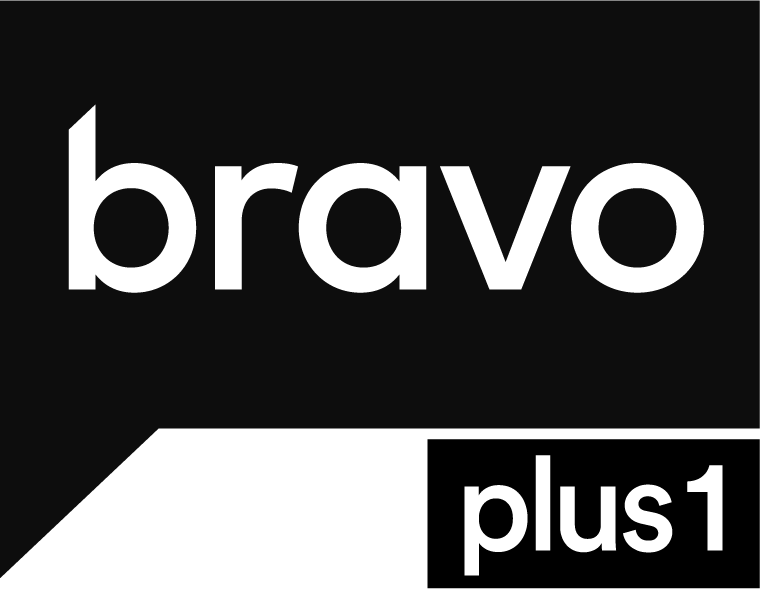
Bravo Plus 1 logo

On 3 July 2016, coinciding with the launch of Bravo, MediaWorks launched a standard hour delayed timeshift channel of the broadcast to replace Four Plus 1.
