= Freeview (New Zealand) =

Digital television platform in New Zealand

Freeview New Zealand Limited
- Logo used since 2023
- Industry: Digital television provider
- Founded: 2 May 2007
- Headquarters: Auckland, New Zealand
- Products: Free-to-air television
- Services: Digital terrestrial television Satellite television Internet Protocol television
- Website: www.freeviewnz.tv

Freeview is New Zealand's free-to-air television platform. It is operated by a joint venture between the country's major free-to-air broadcasters – government-owned Television New Zealand and Radio New Zealand, government-subsidised Whakaata Māori, and the commercially owned Sky Network Television.

It consists of a digital terrestrial television service to around 86% of the population in the major urban and provincial centres of New Zealand, and a satellite television service, covering the whole of mainland New Zealand and the major offshore islands. Both services are HD-capable as of 2025. Freeview uses the DVB-S2 and DVB-T standards on government-provided spectrum.

Additionally, an IPTV service is provided via the Freeview Streaming TV app, available on a range of smart TVs and Android TV devices.

Freeview was launched in May 2007, preparing for analogue switch-off, which began on 30 September 2012 and was completed on 1 December 2013. In 2014, it was estimated that Freeview made up approximately 61.7% of the television share in New Zealand.

Freeview-certified set-top boxes and IDTVs, as well as PVRs, are available at most major retailers. Uncertified equipment can also be used to receive the service, which may have advantages (cheaper, extra features, international channels) and disadvantages (no/limited EPG, no auto-retuning) over certified equipment.

== History ==
Former logo (2007–2011)

Former logo (2011–2023)

On 15 June 2006, New Zealand's Minister of Broadcasting, Steve Maharey announced that Freeview's digital television would broadcast via satellite (DVB-S) from mid-2007 and via terrestrial transmissions (DVB-T) from mid-2008. Freeview's marketing campaign began on 23 April 2007 through a website and through four television advertisements shown on Freeview's shareholders' TV channels, using the slogan "Make bad reception a thing of the past", and showing people using proverbial substitutes for rabbit ears for receiving TV reception. Since 2012, Māori comedian Pio Terei has been the advertising face of Freeview.

It was announced the satellite service (up-linked from the Avalon studios in Lower Hutt), would have up to 18 channels available, with six each assigned to TVNZ and Mediaworks frequencies, and the balance to other networks.

Freeview's satellite service began on 2 May 2007 with five television channels: TV One, TV2, TV3, C4, and Māori Television. Freeview's first digital-only channel, TVNZ Sport Extra temporary channel from TVNZ, began on 18 May 2007, providing coverage of the V8 Supercar racing. The channel has since ceased broadcasting.

The Freeview terrestrial service, originally named "Freeview|HD", officially launched on 14 April 2008. The service initially operated only from Kordia sites for areas surrounding Auckland, Hamilton, Tauranga, Napier-Hastings, Palmerston North, Wellington, Christchurch, and Dunedin. JDA sites were upgraded later with DVB-T QAM modulating multiplexers for non-metro areas.

An IPTV streaming app, Freeview Streaming TV was launched in 2019 by Dish TV. This app was originally locked to devices sold by Dish TV only. From 12 December 2022, the app was made available for many smart TVs running the Android TV operating system, as well as some LG, Samsung and Panasonic TVs running a proprietary operating system.

== Services ==
=== Virtual channels ===
The Freeview ordering groups broadcasters by how much they pay for government owned Kordia transmission services.

==== Higher viewership nationwide ====
- original nationwide (that were analogue simulcast):
  - TVNZ 1 (4 regions, selected HD, timeshifted, government-owned)
  - TVNZ 2 (selected HD, timeshifted, government-owned)
  - Three (selected HD, timeshifted)
  - Bravo (timeshifted and Sky transponder on satellite)
  - Whakaata Māori (government subsidised, selected HD)
  - Sky Open (selected HD and Sky transponder on satellite)
- Digital only:
  - TVNZ Duke (selected HD, timeshifted)
  - Rush (selected HD)
  - Te Reo (government subsidised, streaming only)
  - Eden (selected HD)
  - HGTV
  - Al Jazeera

==== Lower viewership nationwide ====
- All Kordia and JDA national sites:
  - Shine TV (with satellite and streaming coverage)
  - Firstlight TV (with satellite coverage)
  - Hope Channel (with satellite and streaming coverage)
  - CH200 (terrestrial only)
- Kordia metro terrestrial sites: (Note: Terrestrial coverage is limited to Kordia sites in Auckland, Waikato, Tauranga, Hawke's Bay, Manawatu, Kapiti, Wellington, Christchurch, and Dunedin)
  - Trackside 1 and 2 (selected HD, streaming coverage)
  - Parliament TV (with satellite and streaming coverage, government subsidised)
  - Channel 33
- Streaming coverage only:
  - Juice TV

==== Locally inserted terrestrial only ====
- Kordia local terrestrial site only:
  - Apna Television (Auckland)
  - Channel 39 (Dunedin)
- JDA local terrestrial site only:
  - Television Hawke's Bay (Hawke's Bay)
  - Wairarapa TV (Wairarapa)

==== Higher priority nationwide radio ====
- Satellite and Kordia terrestrial sites only
  - Radio New Zealand National (government subsidised)
  - Radio New Zealand Concert (government subsidised)

==== Lower priority nationwide radio ====
- Radio Aotearoa

==== Local independent non-Freeview terrestrial only ====
- Auckland Sky Tower JDA site: (Note: Formerly on UHF-50 (706 MHz), these channels were forced off this frequency on 1 December 2013. These channels returned in early 2014 with a infill for the far northern Auckland community close to the Whangaparāoa Peninsula on UHF-26 (514 MHz). DTV channels above 698 MHz should never have been allocated due to the planned reallocation of the 700 MHz spectrum for LTE mobile networks.)
  - SCTV (Korean Christian)
  - V1 (Korean movies)
  - V2 – YTN (Korean commercial news)
  - K-POP (Korean music videos)
  - V4 – CNC (Chinese state news in English)
  - V5 – NHK World (Japanese state news and documentaries in English)
  - V6 – Arirang TV (Korean documentaries in English)
  - V7 – Zee TV (Indian entertainment)
  - V8 – Republic TV (Indian commercial news)
  - Mainland TV 1 and 2 (previously simulcast on analogue)
  - local news (looped video)
  - VOA (rebroadcast)
  - VOA Music Mix (rebroadcast)
- 45 South TV for Oamaru from Cape Wanbrow owned site @ 34 (578 MHz)

==== MHEG Interaction Channel ====
MHEG-IC channels are from LCN 200 to 299. From 2011 it is mandatory for all TVs over 32 inches (81 cm) and PVRs to include IP-based MHEG Interaction Channel. it is optional on receivers to ensure that a lower-cost option is available as New Zealand heads towards DSO.

In October 2014, Worldnet TV launched the first commercial MHEG-IC channel in New Zealand and was added to JDA regional sites as an MHEG-IC application on LCN 250 which includes seven live streams. As of 29 October 2014, live channels include NHK World, Arirang TV, MBC, Yonhap, MBN, HiTV+ and BTN.

=== Metadata ===
Freeview has its own eight-day electronic programme guide (EPG), named Freeview EPG; TVNZ's Teletext service was also available until it was discontinued in April 2013. The EPG via the satellite service provides an eight-day schedule with programme details on both a traditional EIT and MHEG-5 application, whereas the EPG via the terrestrial service has limited programme details via the traditional EIT with full details available only via the MHEG-5 application.

For all certified NZ Freeview (also all Australian "Freeview EPG" branded) receivers to activate the MHEG-5 EPG, the receiver must remap the remote control's guide button to be an extended function key for use by MHEG-5 applications which are normally limited to the four coloured buttons for launching functions. This is more common on terrestrial than on satellite due to the differences in launch dates. Receivers that do this make the traditional EIT function useless, which is why independent local broadcasters (such as the Hawke's Bay's TVHB) have to pay Freeview to include their scheduling details within the Freeview guide. Broadcasters within the UK do not have this problem as they only use the traditional EIT with MHEG-5's use limited to interactive services such as the Red Button Teletext replacement and internet streaming services.

During the third week of December 2014, TVNZ tested using the same Huffman look-up tables the BBC implemented to force viewers to use approved Freeview receivers that restrict HD recording and viewing. The Huffman tables are being used to compress the EIT text used for terrestrial schedule event names and descriptions. From March 2015, TVNZ began compressing the EIT schedule again. Compressing the EIT text in the schedule would not achieve the same receiver use given the terrestrial EIT only has limited programme details. Receivers that do not use the BBC huffman tables will either display no details or display garbage characters.

The assigned identifiers managed by TVNZ and Kordia on behalf of Freeview are as follows:

H.222 Program IDs (aka Service IDs)

- 10xx – TVNZ provided satellite channels
- 12xx – TVNZ provided terrestrial channels
- 13xx – Sky Free provided terrestrial channels
- 14xx – Kordia/JDA provided terrestrial channels
- 15xx – Kordia provided terrestrial channels
- 16xx – independently provided terrestrial channels
- 19xx – All other provided satellite channels
- 41xx – Sky Network Television provided terrestrial channels

H.222 Transport IDs

- 21 for the Sky Free leased satellite service
- 22 for the TVNZ leased satellite service
- 23 – 24 are reserved for future operated satellite services
- 25 for the TVNZ operated Auckland terrestrial service
- 26 for the TVNZ operated Waikato/Bay of Plenty terrestrial service
- 27 for the TVNZ operated Wellington terrestrial service
- 28 for the TVNZ operated South Island terrestrial service
- 29 for the Sky Free operated Auckland terrestrial service
- 30 for the Sky Free operated Waikato/Bay of Plenty terrestrial service
- 31 for the Sky Free operated Wellington terrestrial service
- 32 for the Sky Free operated South Island terrestrial service
- 33 for the Kordia metro (K1) and JDA (J1) regional operated terrestrial service
- 34 for the Kordia only (K2) operated terrestrial service
- 35 – 36 are reserved for future Kordia operated terrestrial services
- 38 for an independently operated terrestrial service
- 65 for the Sky Network Television operated terrestrial service

DVB Transmission Network ID for the Freeview terrestrial service is 13313.

DVB Original (content) Network ID for the terrestrial service is 8746.

DVB Transmission and Original (content) Network ID for the satellite service is 47 and registered to TVNZ.

DVB Transmission and Original (content) Network ID for the Igloo terrestrial service is 11008 and registered to Sky.

DVB-T Cell ID used by the Kordia operated terrestrial service for filtering channels by transmitter site:

This is a five digit number with the first digit identifying the transport provider, the second digit identifies the multiplexed transport, the third digit identifies the region with the final two specifying the region's transmitter site.

Provider

1. TVNZ
2. Sky Free
3. Kordia
- 6 – Independent

Regions

1. Upper North Island
2. Waikato/Bay of Plenty
3. Hawke's Bay
4. Taranaki/Manawatu
5. Lower North Island
6. Upper South Island
7. Lower South Island

Transmitter Site

- 00 – Kordia primary
- 01 – 04 – Kordia infill
- 05 – Independent
- 10/20/40/50 – JDA primary
- 11 – JDA infill
- 30 – Kordia Lower North Island secondary

=== Distribution ===
As of 2023 the Freeview platform has 29 television channels and 4 radio stations.

== Defunct channels ==
Services (taken from AsiaSat 3S @ 105 east) that were available before the Freeview launch on satellite were Zing channels ZEE TV, Cinema, News and Punjabi, BHARAT TV, Al Jazeera Arabic and English channels, DWTV, TV5 and VOA.

The Freeview|HD Demo terrestrial channel 100 was removed to free up space for various SD channels.

The TVNZ Sport Extra channel 20 was temporarily provided for the 2008 Olympics, the space on DVB-S was later used by a regional version of TV One.

The Auckland-based STRATOS channel 21 was discontinued due to service fee increases that occurred when its ratings increased, it was later replaced by ChoiceTV. STRATOS later reemerged on pay TV under the name Face TV.

TVNZ 6 and 7 were discontinued due to the government-provided funding coming to an end and were respectively, replaced by U and an hour delay of TV One. TVNZ U was replaced by an hour delay of TV2 in 2013.

Trackside became a pay TV-only channel on 14 April 2014 as a measure to raise more revenue for increased services for New Zealand Racing Board customers.

C4 closed down on 26 June 2014 to free space for a time-shifted version of FOUR.

The following channels were closed down due to being unable to meet transmission costs: Sommet Sports on 12 December 2014, Cue on 10 April 2015, and tvCentral (Hamilton and Tauranga) and TV Rotorua both on 30 April 2015.

TV29, also known as Panda Channel 29, was closed by Best News Entertainment on 1 October 2021.

Breeze TV and sister channel The Edge TV, were both closed on 22 March 2022.

Te Reo stopped broadcasting over-the-air on 28 March 2025. It is still available on the Freeview streaming app.

== Other broadcasters ==
Freeview will be open to other free-to-air broadcasters if they want to join.

According to Kordia there is space for approximately only 20 channels on the two satellite transponders that Freeview leases as of 2011. However at 22.5 MBd with a FEC of 3/4 one 23 MHz frequency can only accommodate either six SD 4:3 H.262 QPSK channels or four HD 16:9 H.264 8PSK channels while maintaining an optimal bit rate.

== Quality ==
Satellite transmissions are broadcast in 576i, but the satellite transponder is high-definition capable. Terrestrial transmissions can be broadcast in high definition, and the government lets the broadcasters decide whether to broadcast in high definition or to continue in standard definition.

Six channels currently broadcast in high definition: TVNZ 1, TVNZ 2, TVNZ DUKE, Three, Whakaata Māori and Te Reo in 1080i.

Freeview satellite broadcasts have declined in quality since the service launched as TV ONE and TV3 are now being broadcast many times to provide region-specific advertisements; this reduces the bandwidth available to other channels on that frequency. From July 2016, Mediaworks deregionalised TV3 so that it uses 1 SD channel alongside its HD channel.

The TVNZ frequency currently has 8 SD channels while the Sky Free frequency has 12 TV channels and 5 radio channels.

== Technology ==
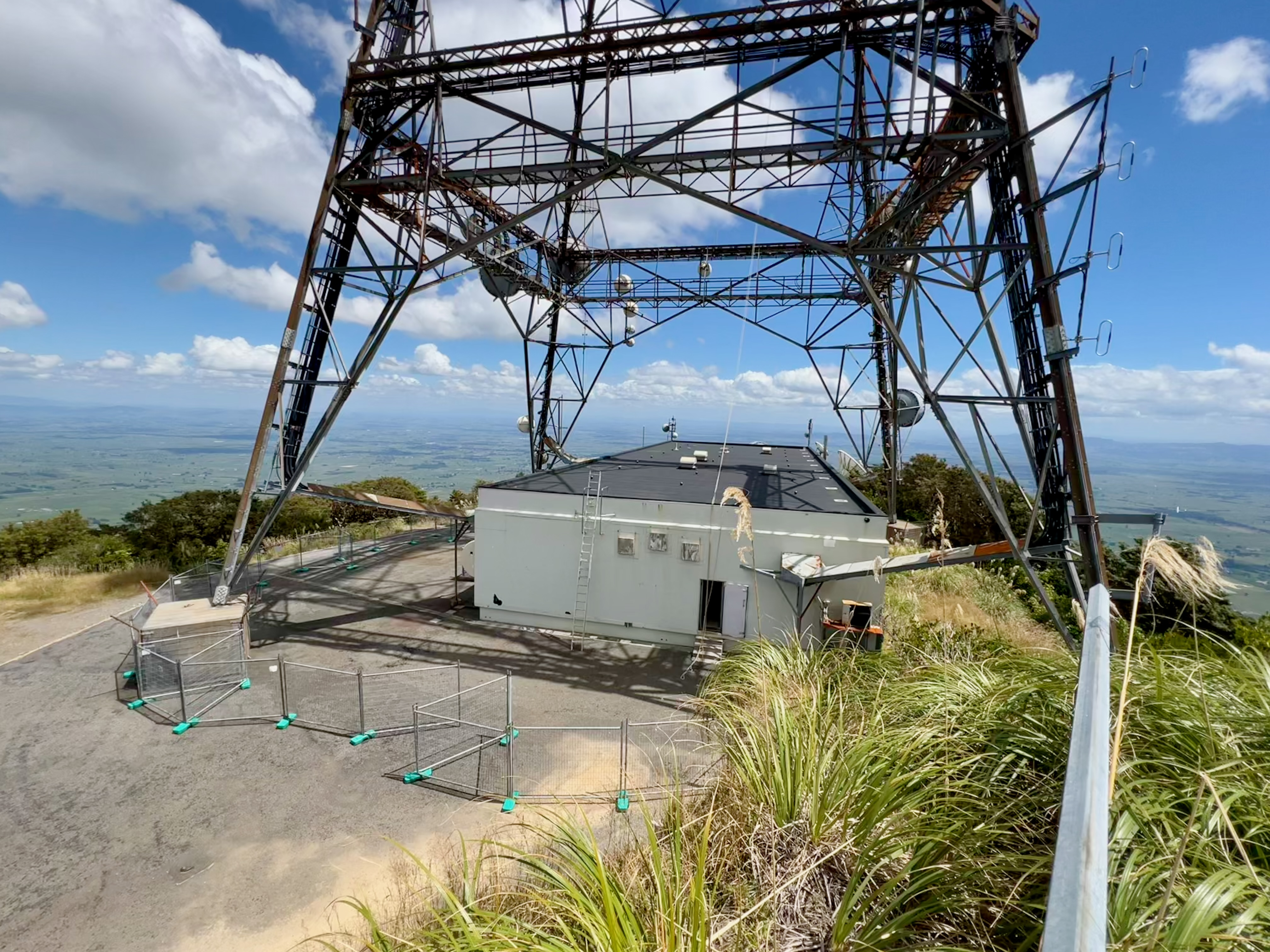
Te Aroha transmitter

UHF terrestrial broadcasting using DVB-T H.264 (also known as DVB-T HD), and currently covers 86 percent of the country's population. Only three towns with a population over 10,000 do not have terrestrial service: Queenstown (population 29,000), Blenheim (population 29,800) and Whakatāne (population 16,950). In addition, Oamaru (population 14,300) has limited terrestrial service through local station 45 South TV, while coverage of Cambridge (population 22,700) is intermittent as hills partially block the signal from Te Aroha transmitter and Hamilton Towers transmitter is not powerful enough (63 watts) to reach the town. Freeview's terrestrial transmissions are broadcast from Kordia's and JDA's transmitter towers.

Freeview uses the DVB-T ODFM standard for terrestrial transmission, as established in 2001 with NZS6610:2001, to avoid the multipath problem caused by New Zealand's rugged topography. ATSC, the rival US standard that uses 8-VSB modulation, had a number of first gen. demodulators that could not handle multipath well, so it was not chosen.

Terrestrial Freeview is broadcast in H.264, which unlike H.262 has an expensive transmission patent licensing tax for free TV and subscription use. People who took part in the Auckland digital trial using terrestrial H.262 receivers needed to change their receivers to more expensive H.264 models in order to receive terrestrial Freeview. DVB-T H.264 is also known in other countries as DVB-T HD, due to H.262 being used for SD. Currently the government owned TVNZ and Kordia which operate the H.264 re-compression multiplexers are failing to fully meet the in Good Standing payments to be included in the licensees listing. MHEG-5 is used for the electronic programming guide.

MHEG-5 support is built by the UK's Strategy and Technology who provided the similar applications for the BBC's Red Button and terrestrial internet streaming platform.

Freeview Satellite uses the Optus fleet of satellites#Optus D2 satellite @ 160°E to broadcast, on two transponders, leased from Kordia. The satellite transmissions utilise H.262 video. Freeview cannot easily move to H.264 video broadcasting in the future as the encoding is unsupported by a large number of the receivers in the Freeview Satellite install base, also the additional patent licensing tax would make the satellite service even more expensive for channel operators. Unlike the terrestrial service, the satellite service broadcasts a more useful traditional DVB EPG alongside the functionally limited MHEG-5 EPG.

Freeview had discussed with Telecom about the provision of IPTV over ADSL until it was shelved due to bandwidth and availability limitations.

=== Certification ===
Freeview certifies set-top boxes but does not sell them; they are marketed by electronics retailers. Freeview certification centres the localisation of multimedia data, primarily for the electronic programming guide (EPG). This data is broadcast over DVB using the MHEG-5 standard. At the moment this is only used to transmit EPG data.

Freeview Record certification of digital video recorders is similar to Freeview certification, but also includes dual tuner with smart conflict resolution including alternate recordings of repeat programmes and one touch series recording from the EPG. Full fast forward and rewind cuing is available while an automatic ad skip function is not allowed. For copyrighted HD content, only devices that comply with studio DTCP are allowed to externally transfer content while all SD content is transferable. There are no time limits on content playback. As of May 2012, there are currently two certified MyFreeview Satellite receivers available, which are from the New Zealand-based Dish TV company.

MHEG-5 is used exclusively for a full 8-day terrestrial broadcast schedule as Freeview do not fully populate the DVB EIT EPG, this means there are few uncertified terrestrial receivers on the market able to run the MHEG-5 Freeview EPG application. An uncertified terrestrial DVR would have to know the specific files to extract from the DSM-CC stream to support a full EPG.

Freeview certification requires set-top boxes to disallow high definition video output over connections that do not support HDCP. In practice this means nearly all HD CRT televisions sold in New Zealand and many early flat screen televisions can only receive high definition from an uncertified set-top box, which can output high definition over HDCP-free connections like component cables or on HDMI without HDCP.

Digital TV Labs is an officially approved test centre for Freeview New Zealand conformance testing, where manufacturers wishing to deploy devices with the associated Freeview New Zealand logos and access to the Freeview EPG can obtain pass reports.

There are also many non-certified options are available. These and other FTA receivers have no limit on advert skipping nor restrict access to the recorded files or prevent streaming of recordings to other devices, Ultraplus X-9200HD PVR, Vu+ Duo, Xcruiser XDSR385HD PVR are all examples of units that are or have been sold in NZ and have all of this capability. They can also receive any other available non-freeview channel.

=== Terrestrial transmitters ===
Map of transmitters in New Zealand – high power in red, medium power in yellow, and low power non-infill in green

Kordia and Johnson Dick and Associates (JDA) maintain a terrestrial network of 64-QAM and 256-QAM capable transmitters around New Zealand.

Kordia-owned sites are on mostly Crown-owned DOC land and provide television and radio digital services to only Freeview and Igloo, whereas JDA-equipped sites are only on commercial land. Shared sites (such as Auckland's Sky Tower) have the advantage of not requiring a separate antenna – unlike Nelson's Mainland TV, which is located between sites. In the Wairarapa and Southland, JDA's Popoiti and Forest Hill transmitters were used rather than Kordia's Otahoua and Hedgehope transmitters, which had previously been used for UHF transmitters, necessitating viewers in these regions to rotate their outdoor antennas.

Polarisation (i.e., antenna orientation) is either horizontal/flat (H) or vertical/tall (V). A high-power site has a licensed broadcasting power of 10,000 watts or greater; a medium-power site has a licensed broadcasting power of between 500 and 10,000 watts; and a low-power site has a licensed broadcasting power of less than 500 watts.

High-power sites (all except the last operated by Kordia):

- Waiatarua (H) for the Auckland metropolitan area (including Pukekohe)
- Te Aroha (H) for the Waikato and parts of Tauranga
- Mount Erin (V) for Hawke's Bay
- Mount Taranaki (H) for Taranaki
- Wharite (V) for the Manawatū
- Kaukau for the Wellington (H) metropolitan area
- Sugarloaf (H) for Christchurch
- Mount Cargill (H) for Dunedin
- Forest Hill (V) for Invercargill

Medium-power sites run by Kordia:

- Waiheke Island Airstrip (V) for Waiheke Island
- Kopukairua (V) for Tauranga
- Ngarara (V) for Kāpiti
- Fitzherbert (V) for Lower Hutt and Wainuiomata

Medium-power sites run by JDA:

- Parihaka (V) for Whangārei
- Sky Tower (V) for Auckland
- Pukepoto (V) for Rotorua
- Whakaroa (V) for Taupō
- Parikanapa (H) and Wheatstone Road (H) for Gisborne
- Popoiti (H) for the Wairarapa
- Mount Campbell (V) and Botanical Ridge (H) for Nelson
- Cave Hill (V) for Timaru

Low-power sites (all except the last operated by Kordia):

- Pinehill (H) for Auckland's North Shore, (Note: While named after the suburb of Pinehill, the transmitter is actually located in the suburb of Murrays Bay)
- Remuera (V) for the Remuera area
- Hamilton Towers (V) for Hamilton city
- Napier Airport (V) for northern Napier
- Mount Jowett (H) for Whanganui
- Baxters Knob (H) for Porirua and Tawa
- Haywards (V) for the Hutt Valley

== Finance ==
Freeview is the second digital TV system attempted by the government. The first, in 2000, cost NZ$6.8 million.

The government will pay up to NZ$25 million and provide free radio spectrum, estimated to be worth up to NZ$10 million during the transition to digital; the companies involved will pay the remaining $50 million. Canterbury TV estimates it will need to pay NZ$1 million a year if it joins Freeview. The government claims a NZ$230 million benefit to the economy.

== Competition ==
Sky had a decoder rental package where free-to-air channels similar to the ones available on Freeview were available for a low monthly fee. In 2006, around 90,000 people used this service, generally those who could not get a high quality signal from analogue terrestrial television. Sky has been relatively unaffected by the launch of Freeview. Because both services use Optus D1, a Sky dish can be used to receive Freeview, but a separate set-top box is required.

== See also ==
- Television in New Zealand
- List of free-to-air channels in New Zealand
- Digital changeover dates in New Zealand
- Lounge TV
