= Sky Free =

New Zealand media subsidiary

Sky Free Limited
- Formerly: MediaWorks TV Limited (2013–2020); Discovery NZ Limited (2020–2025)
- Type: Subsidiary
- Industry: Media
- Predecessor: TVWorks
- Founded: August 9, 2013; 13 years ago
- Headquarters: Auckland, New Zealand
- Area served: New Zealand
- Brands: Eden; HGTV; Rush; Sky Open; Three; ThreeNow
- Parent: Sky Network Television
- Website: skyfree.co.nz

Sky Free Limited is a subsidiary of Sky Network Television that operates six national free-to-air television channels and the ad-supported streaming television service, ThreeNow in New Zealand.

The subsidiary company was formed in 2013 as MediaWorks TV Limited, a division of MediaWorks New Zealand and successor to TVWorks (1990–2013).

In 2019, MediaWorks announced that they were selling their television operations. In September 2020, Discovery, Inc. purchased MediaWorks TV with the acquisition being finalised on 1 December 2020. The subsidiary was subsequently rebranded as Discovery New Zealand, and the company was renamed to Discovery NZ Limited. In late July 2025, Warner Bros. Discovery announced it would exit New Zealand and sell its assets to Sky TV, effective 1 August 2025. Sky TV also confirmed that Discovery NZ would be rebranded as Sky Free for trademarking reasons.

== History ==
=== Background ===
Three was founded as TV3 in 1989 after the Fourth Labour government allowed for a private television broadcaster. CanWest obtained TV3 between 1991 and 1997 after the National government loosened rules on foreign ownership. In March 1998, Under CanWest control, TV3 relaunched with a new brand and a 3 News bulletin hosted by John Campbell and Carol Hirschfeld.

MediaWorks was created in 2004 following the merger of TVWorks and RadioWorks, and owned TV3 and C4. In 2005, Hilary Barry & Mike McRoberts became the station's news anchors. TV3 staff also launched youth station TV4 in 1997, and replaced it with C4 on October 3, 2003.

In 2009, the timeshift channel TV3 Plus 1 was launched. C4 2 was launched in 2010, then, when TV4 returned as FOUR, taking over C4's Channel 4 position in early 2011, C4 converted C4 2 into a music show as it was moved to Freeview Channel 9.

=== MediaWorks New Zealand (2013–2020) ===
In 2014, timeshift channel Four Plus 1 was launched, and The Edge TV replaced C4. In May 2016, MediaWorks and NBCUniversal Television Distribution entered into a joint venture and revamped FOUR as the new reality television channel Bravo. In August 2016, Michael Anderson was appointed as CEO of MediaWorks.

In 2017, TV3 was rebranded as Three. On 15 April 2018, MediaWorks launched ThreeLife, a lifestyle channel. On 1 July 2019, The Edge TV moved exclusively online, and was replaced on TV by ThreeLife + 1.

On 18 October 2019, it was announced that MediaWorks was intending to sell off its television division, including Three, ThreeLife, and Bravo. MediaWorks also intends to sell its Flower Street head office and studios in Auckland's Eden Terrace. Several Three television programs and shows have also been canceled. Media commentator Bill Ralston has claimed that hundreds of jobs could be lost if a buyer is not found.

ThreeLife and ThreeLife + 1 went off air on 26 March 2020. ThreeLife was replaced by The Edge TV. ThreeLife + 1 was replaced by a simulcast of The Breeze, then The Breeze TV on 16 April.

On 25 May 2020, MediaWorks CEO Michael Anderson announced that the company would be eliminating 130 jobs in its sales, out-of-home, and radio divisions as a result of the economic effects of the COVID-19 pandemic in New Zealand.

=== Discovery, Inc. (2020–2022) ===
Former logo between 2020 and 2022.

On 7 September 2020, MediaWorks confirmed that it would be selling its entire television arm including Three, Bravo, The Edge TV, The Breeze TV, streaming service ThreeNow, and current affairs service Newshub to Discovery, Inc. The acquisition of MediaWorks was finalised on 1 December 2020, with the subsidiary being rebranded as Discovery NZ Limited.

On 27 April 2021, Discovery Inc. confirmed that it would be restructuring its business operations in Australia and New Zealand with the goal of incorporating Three, Bravo, and Newshub into a single trans-Tasman organisation. Earlier in the month, Discovery announced that this new trans-Tasman organisation would be headed by two general managers, the Sydney–based Rebecca Kent and Glen Kyne in Auckland. Discovery had also separately acquired New Zealand's TopTV operations in 2019.

On 13 May 2021, Newshub closed its Dunedin office as part of a restructuring of Discovery's business operations in Australia and New Zealand. Following the closure of the Dunedin newsroom, the network's South Island operations will consist of its Christchurch–based bureau as well as freelancers.

On 10 November 2021, it was announced that Choice TV would be rebranded as Gusto in March 2022. However, shortly before launch the name Gusto was scrapped and changed to "eden" in order to avoid confusion with the former TVNZ OnDemand food channel of the same name. The rebranded channel will retain most of Choice's programming, with the major additions of Newshub Live at 8pm, an extension of Discovery New Zealand's news brand Newshub, and more drama programming. The channel will host British drama, game shows, and "intelligent" movies including Changing Rooms, Big Family Farm, Finding Alice, and a new local show called Great Southern Truckers.

A second channel called Rush will host "high energy shows" within the survival and adventure genres including Wheeler Dealers, Man vs. Wild, Street Outlaws and Treehouse Masters. Discovery also confirmed that its working on several local productions including MasterChef New Zealand, The Masked Singer NZ, Dancing with the Stars, Match Fit, Patrick Gower: On series, David Lomas Investigates, and 7 Days. In addition, Discovery also announced plans to launch a new Newshub Live at 8pm bulletin and AM Early show in 2022.

=== Warner Bros. Discovery (2022–2025) ===
On 8 April 2022, Discovery, Inc. acquired WarnerMedia from AT&T, with the two companies being merged into a new entity called Warner Bros. Discovery. As a result, Discovery New Zealand and its assets Newshub and channel Three became part of the new media company.

As a result, Discovery New Zealand was rebranded as Warner Bros. Discovery New Zealand. On 20 April 2022, World Rugby and Spark Sport announced that Warner Bros. Discovery NZ's channel Three would be the free-to-air broadcaster for the delayed Rugby World Cup 2021, held in New Zealand from 8 October to 12 November 2022.

On 28 February 2024, Warner Bros. Discovery announced a proposal to shutter the news division of Three, Newshub, permanently beginning 1 July. About 300 staff lost their jobs. The head of Warner Bros. Discovery Asia Pacific cited a significant decline in TV ad revenues as the key motivator for the decision. Initial reactions of shock have been compounded by concerns over the effects this could have on media concentration in New Zealand, leaving the country with only two television news broadcasters, the state-owned 1News and Whakaata Māori.

On 10 April 2024, Warner Bros. Discovery confirmed that Newshub would air its final bulletin on 5 July 2024, resulting in about 300 job losses. The company rejected a staff proposal for a pared down news bulletin service. On 16 April 2024, Warner Bros. Discovery and newspaper company Stuff jointly confirmed that Stuff would produce 6pm news bulletins for Three, commencing 6 July. Stuff publisher Sinead Boucher also confirmed that Stuff would hire several former Newshub staff (less than 40-50) to produce the 6pm bulletins. In late May 2024, Stuff revealed that the news bulletin service would be called ThreeNews.

In late July 2025, Discovery NZ reported a NZ$77.6 million loss for the 2024 financial year, ending December 2024.

=== Sky Network Television (2025–present) ===
On 22 July 2025, it was announced at the New Zealand's Exchange that company's free-to-air television and streaming operations will be bought by Sky Network Television Limited for NZ$1. The sale was completed on 1 August 2025 with Warner Bros. Discovery continuing pay TV, HBO Max and local production operations in New Zealand.

On 28 July, Sky TV confirmed that Discovery New Zealand would be renamed Sky Free following the acquisition since they would no longer be able to use the old name due to legal reasons. Sky also filed trademark applications for the names and logos for Sky Free and SkyFree with the Intellectual Property Office of New Zealand. The website address skyfree.co.nz was also registered with a domain company. Sky also confirmed that it would retain the Three and ThreeNow brands.

According to Stop Press, Sky's acquisition of Warner Bros. Discovery's former assets is projected to give the television broadcaster a combined audience reach of 2.2 million linear viewers and 1.2 million digital viewers per week. In addition, Sky and Three will share NZ Rugby's broadcast rights for the next five years.

=== Ownership and brands ===
Ownership	Channel Year	3	4	8	9	11	13	14	18	Online only
TV3	1989	TV3	—N/a	—N/a	—N/a	—N/a	—N/a	—N/a	—N/a	—N/a
Westpac	1990	TV3	—N/a	—N/a	—N/a	—N/a	—N/a	—N/a	—N/a	—N/a
Canwest	1997	TV3	TV4	—N/a	—N/a	—N/a	—N/a	—N/a	—N/a	—N/a
Canwest	2003	TV3	C4	—N/a	—N/a	—N/a	—N/a	—N/a	—N/a	—N/a
MediaWorks	2004	TV3	C4	—N/a	—N/a	—N/a	—N/a	—N/a	—N/a	—N/a
MediaWorks	2009	TV3	C4	TV3 Plus 1	—N/a	—N/a	—N/a	—N/a	—N/a	—N/a
MediaWorks	2010	TV3	C4	TV3 Plus 1	C4 2	—N/a	—N/a	—N/a	—N/a	—N/a
MediaWorks	2011	TV3	Four	TV3 Plus 1	C4	—N/a	—N/a	—N/a	—N/a	—N/a
MediaWorks	2014	TV3	Four	TV3 Plus 1	Four Plus 1	The Edge TV	—N/a	—N/a	—N/a	—N/a
MediaWorks	2016	TV3	Bravo	TV3 Plus 1	Bravo Plus 1	The Edge TV	—N/a	—N/a	—N/a	—N/a
MediaWorks	2017	Three	Bravo	ThreePlus1	Bravo Plus 1	The Edge TV	—N/a	—N/a	—N/a	—N/a
MediaWorks	2018	Three	Bravo	ThreePlus1	Bravo Plus 1	ThreeLife	—N/a	—N/a	The Edge TV	—N/a
MediaWorks	2018	Three	Bravo	ThreePlus1	Bravo Plus 1	ThreeLife	—N/a	The Edge TV	—N/a	—N/a
MediaWorks	2019	Three	Bravo	ThreePlus1	Bravo Plus 1	ThreeLife	—N/a	ThreeLife + 1	—N/a	The Edge TV
Discovery	2020	Three	Bravo	ThreePlus1	Bravo Plus 1	The Edge TV	—N/a	Breeze TV	—N/a	—N/a
Warner Bros. Discovery	2022	Three	Bravo	Eden	Bravo Plus 1	—N/a	ThreePlus1	Rush	Eden+1	—N/a
Sky Network Television	2025	Three	Bravo	Eden	Bravo Plus 1	—N/a	ThreePlus1	Rush	Eden+1	—N/a
Sky Network Television	2026	Three	Bravo	Sky Open	Rush	—N/a	ThreePlus1	Bravo Plus 1	Eden	—N/a

== Services ==
=== Television ===
Three, Bravo, Eden and Rush are operated out of Auckland. Television advertising was sold by the MediaWorks offices in Auckland, Wellington, Christchurch, Melbourne, Sydney and Hamilton. There were Newshub bureaus in the Three Headquarters in Auckland and MediaWorks offices in Wellington, Christchurch and Dunedin, with news staff working out of other offices as needed. Three provided mature content, Newshub bulletins, current affairs and sport. The Edge TV launched in 2014 and broadcasts music videos and entertainment news. All are available via all digital platforms such as terrestrial, satellite and cable. TV3 and Four were the only ones previously available via analogue terrestrial on the VHF band before the 2013 switch-off. The Edge TV was added in 2018. Bravo and Bravo Plus 1 replaced Four and Four Plus 1 in 2016. ThreeLife was added in 2018, and ThreeLife + 1 replaced The Edge TV on terrestrial in 2019. On 25 March 2020, ThreeLife went off air, and was replaced by The Edge TV, and its timeshift channel by Breeze TV. In 2022, The Edge TV and Breeze TV went off air to make way for the new Rush, Eden and Eden+1 (timeshift) channels.

==== Free-to-air television brands ====
Name	Freeview Channel	Sky Channel	Launched	Notes
Three	3 (13 - Plus1)	3 (503 - Plus1)	1989	
Bravo	4 (14 - Plus 1)	12 (512 - Plus 1)	2016	Owned by NBCUniversal. Operated as a joint venture until 2024.
Sky Open	8	4	1998	Sky's existing free-to-air channel. Purchased by Sky Network Television in 2006, known as Prime until 2023.
Rush	14	24	2022	
Eden	18	13	2012	Acquired from the merger of Discovery NZ and Top TV Limited in 2021. Known as Choice TV until 2022.
HGTV	19	21	2016	Acquired from the merger of Discovery NZ and Top TV Limited in 2021. Brand licensed from Skydance.

==== Former free-to-air television brands ====
Name	Launched	Closed	Notes
Four	1997	2016	Formerly TV4. Replaced by C4 in October 2003. Relaunched as Four in February 2011.
C4	2003	2014	Replaced by The Edge TV. The first and final ever music video to air on C4 was The D4 - Exit To The City.
C42	2010	2011	Replaced by Four and converted to a music show for C4.
The Edge TV	2014	2022	Extension of the MediaWorks-owned radio brand, The Edge.
ThreeLife	2018	2020	ThreeLife and ThreeLife + 1 replaced by The Edge TV and Breeze TV respectively.
Breeze TV	2020	2022	Extension of MediaWorks-owned radio brand, The Breeze.

=== Websites ===
Website Name	Primary purpose
skyfree.co.nz	Corporate website for various TV channels
Threenow.co.nz	On-demand service for Sky's various free-to-air channels

==== Defunct websites ====
Website Name	Primary purpose
choicetv.co.nz	On-demand service for Choice TV
hgtv.co.nz	On-demand service for HGTV
newshub.co.nz	Global and New Zealand news content

=== Newshub ===
Newshub was a New Zealand news service that aired on TV channel Three and had articles on their website and app. The Newshub brand replaced 3 News service on the TV3 network and the Radio Live news service heard on MediaWorks Radio stations on 1 February 2016.

== See also ==
- Freeview
- MediaWorks New Zealand
