= ThreeNow =

New Zealand streaming service

- Logo used from 2017 with 2023 version.
- Former names: TV3 On Demand; 3Now
- Website type: OTT platform
- Headquarters: New Zealand
- Owners: MediaWorks New Zealand (until 2020); Discovery, Inc. (2020–2022); Warner Bros. Discovery (2022–2025); Sky Network Television (2025–present)
- Industry: Entertainment
- Parent: Sky Free
- Website: www.threenow.co.nz
- Current status: Active

ThreeNow (previously called TV3 On Demand and 3Now) is a New Zealand over-the-top ad-supported streaming television service owned by Sky Network Television. The service hosts content from Three and its sister channels Bravo, Sky Open, Rush, eden and HGTV. It also hosts content from Warner Bros. Discovery's content library including the live-streaming channels WBTV Paranormal, WBTV Reality, WBTV House Hunters International, WBTV True Crime and WBTV 90 Day Fiancé. It is available on Apple, Android, LG, Panasonic and Sony devices and Smart TVs.

== History ==
=== MediaWorks New Zealand ===
Former 3NOW logo used between 2014 and 2017

In late March 2013, TV3 suspended its TV3 On Demand video service for mobile users while investigating a breach that allowed several users to illegally download content onto their mobile devices. The video service was available on the website with some shows being available on Android devices.

In late February 2014, MediaWorks New Zealand revamped TV3 On Demand as the 3Now app, which was launched on both iOS and Android devices. MediaWorks said that it had online rights to 95% of the video content, which came from TV3, Four and 3 News. The new app also included a new programme guide and was able to recommend shows to viewers. The 3Now app was also sponsored by 2Degrees, which received advertising and promotion in exchange.

In mid April 2016, MediaWorks launched a revamped version of the 3Now app with several improvements including an improved front end, better design and a newer viewing experience tailored to individual users. MediaWorks also redesigned the app's systems to stream advertisements that were able to bypass ad blocking software. In addition, users were also required to log into the 3Now app through various platforms including Facebook. MediaWorks chief information and product officer Tom Cotter said that mandatory logins would help advertisers to connect with their most relevant audiences for targeting purposes.

In September 2019, Stuff columnist Chris Shultz criticised ThreeNow for what he regarded as its "terrible" website and "wonky" mobile app. He criticised the website for not being able to remember passwords, the difficulty in searching for content, its frequent apps and its unavailability on computer gaming consoles.

In October 2019, a Horizon Research survey found that 28% of more than 1,000 New Zealanders surveyed used ThreeNow. The survey found that 59% used TVNZ OnDemand, 29% used Sky TV, 56% used Netflix, and 18% used Lightbox, and 7% used Neon.

=== Discovery New Zealand, 2020–2022 ===
In September 2020, MediaWorks confirmed plans to sell its entire television arm including its streaming service ThreeNow to American mass media company Discovery, Inc. The sale was completed on 1 December 2020.

On 15 June 2021, Three announced it would release the ninth season of the reality television series The Block NZ on the platform at noon before releasing it on its linear channel Three at 7:30pm. Previously, The Block had been released on channel Three first before streaming on ThreeNow. This marked the first time that Three had implemented a digital first strategy to its programming. The digital first strategy came in response to a 2021 JustWatch study showing that ThreeNow was a niche player in a crowded streaming market dominated by Netflix, Disney+, Amazon Prime, Sky's Neon platform and TVNZ On Demand. On 17 June, Discovery's General Manager for Australia and New Zealand, Glen Kyne, announced plans to replace ThreeNow with Discovery's own streaming service Discovery+ as part of the company's plans to expand into New Zealand.

=== Warner Bros. Discovery, 2022–2025 ===
Following Discovery's merger with WarnerMedia to former Warner Bros. Discovery in April 2022, the new entity acquired Discovery's New Zealand assets including Three. In late April 2023, The Spinoff guest columnist Chris Shultz ranked ThreeNow as the 16th top streaming service in New Zealand, describing it as "a shockingly bad streaming service. It plays the same ads over and over again, crashes often, and rarely bothers to do the job it's supposed to do."

On 22 November 2023, WarnerBros Discover ANZ revamped the ThreeNow to include a new menu organised around genre categories, content watchlists, and making it easier for users to watch more content without having to exit playing episodes and pick the next one to stream. In addition, five new livestreaming channels—WBTV Paranormal, WBTV Reality, WBTV House Hunters International, WBTV True Crime and WBTV 90 Day Fiancé—were added to the platform. The Spinoff's Tara Ward regarded the revamped app as an improvement, which placed it on par with other streaming services operating in New Zealand.

=== Sky Network Television, 2025–present ===
On 22 July, Warner Bros. Discovery confirmed that it would sell its New Zealand assets including ThreeNow to Sky Network Television, effective 1 August.

In mid-February 2026, Canstar reported that ThreeNow comprised three percent of the viewership in New Zealand's streaming market during the fourth quarter of 2025, based on measured interest on SVOD from JustWatch. ThreeNow came seventh place, trailing behind Netflix (22%), Amazon Prime Video (21%), Disney+ (17%), Neon (15%), Apple TV+ (9%) and TVNZ+ (6%). Canstar reported that ThreeNow and local platforms Neon and TVNZ+ had experienced a decline in viewership due to competition from international streaming platforms.

== Services ==
By late March 2013, TV3 On Demand was available on Adobe Flash and HTML5 Video but not on iOS devices. By late February 2014, the revamped 3Now app was available on various Android and iOS devices including Samsung Galaxy S3, Samsung Galaxy S4, smart TVs, blu-ray and home theatre devices, iPhone 4, iPhone 5, iPod Touch and some iPads. By April 2016, 3Now was available on both Apple TV and Airplay.

In September 2019, ThreeNow was available on Apple TV and Chromecast but was unavailable on Samsung Smart TVs, PlayStation 4 and Xbox One. In mid-September 2023, ThreeNow was made available on Samsung Smart TVs dating back to at least 2017. By November 2023, ThreeNow's availability was extended to various LG, Panasonic and Sony devices.

== Content ==
ThreeNow's content library hosts several New Zealand and international programmes including The Block NZ, Law & Order: SVU, Blue Bloods, Come Dine with Me New Zealand, Below Deck Mediterranean, Dancing with the Stars, Gogglebox, Chicago Med, Australia's Best Houses, Hawaii Five-O, Married at First Sight Australia, Planet Sex With Cara Delevingne, Blue Lights, One Night, and Mystery Road. The streaming service also hosts content from ThreeNews (the successor to Newshub). In September 2023, the streaming service gained access to WarnerBros Discovery's on-demand content library through ThreeNow's addition to Samsung Smart TVs.

Notable New Zealand content has included the comedy series Guy Montgomery's Guy Mont-Spelling Bee, Far North, Tracked, The Traitors NZ, David Lomas Investigates, 7 Days, Friends Like Her and Tangata Pai.
