= Broadcast Communications =

Broadcast Communications can refer to:

- Kordia, formerly Broadcast Communications Ltd, a New Zealand telecommunications company
- Banijay UK Productions, formerly Broadcast Communications PLC, a British television production company
