= TVNZ Teletext =

TVNZ teletext was the only analogue teletext in New Zealand. It was also available on Freeview and was launched on 1 February 1984 with funding raised in the 1981 New Zealand Telethon, to provide news and information for the deaf. The service was improved in 2006, incorporating more information.

Teletext was available to viewers of TVNZ channels such as TV One, TV2 and TVNZ U. The service was also available on privately owned station TV3; unlike TVNZ, it was available only on its terrestrial service. A separate Teletext service is available to Trackside viewers on page 600; this service has continued to operate following the closure of the TVNZ service. TAB horse was also available on the TVNZ service.

== Closure ==
TVNZ announced in December 2012 that the information service would close on 2 April 2013 due to the decreasing number of regular users, but television captions will continue. TVNZ had announced that the plans to discontinue the service as early as 2009. TVNZ cited the reasons for closure due to the ageing equipment used and the reduce need for such a service as most information can now be found online.

== Pages and content ==
It carried:

- World and New Zealand news
- Extensive weather information, including marine and coastal forecasts
- Sports news, results and statistics
- Business news
- Financial market information
- International and domestic flight arrivals and departures
- TV schedules
- Lottery results
- TAB horse racing and sports betting odds and results (still available on Trackside Channel, page 600)
- Lifestyle information such as horoscopes

It also had captions to most recorded programmes.

From 2006 to its closure:

- 100: Index
- 101: News index
- 102: Sport index
- 103: Weather index
- 104: TV index
- 105: Business index
- 106: Travel index
- 109: A-Z index
- 110-139: News
- 140-149: Weather
- 200-299: Sport
- 301-304: Listings for the four main terrestrial channels for today
- 310: Now/Next
- 311-314: Listings for tomorrow
- 331-337: Daily highlights
- 400-499: Business and Travel
- 500: Lifestyle index
- 510: Horoscopes
- 550-552: Newsreels (international, national, sport)
- 555: Lotto results
- 600: Tabtext (Trackside)
- 801: Captions
