= Kordia =

New Zealand state-owned enterprise

- Type: State-owned enterprise
- Industry: telecommunications
- Founded: New Zealand, 1989 as Broadcast Communications Ltd; New Zealand, 2003 as THL; New Zealand, 2006 as Kordia
- Headquarters: New Zealand
- Key people: Neil Livingston, CEO
- Website: www.kordia.co.nz

Kordia is a New Zealand state-owned enterprise. It provides a range of services, including connectivity, cloud and cyber security services, as well as managed IT, field services, broadcast and safety of life communications.

Kordia owns and operates a network in New Zealand, which is based primarily on digital microwave technology. The company also has access to a number of fibre networks running between Auckland, Wellington and Christchurch. Part of Kordia's 65-year heritage is the nationwide network of transmission towers that was built by the company in its various iterations, including: NZBC, Television New Zealand, BCL and now Kordia. In 2007, Kordia upgraded its high sites to build the digital terrestrial television (DTT) platform, which now hosts Freeview (Free-to-air digital television in New Zealand).

In recent years, Kordia has made several acquisitions in the cyber security, cloud and managed IT space.

== History ==
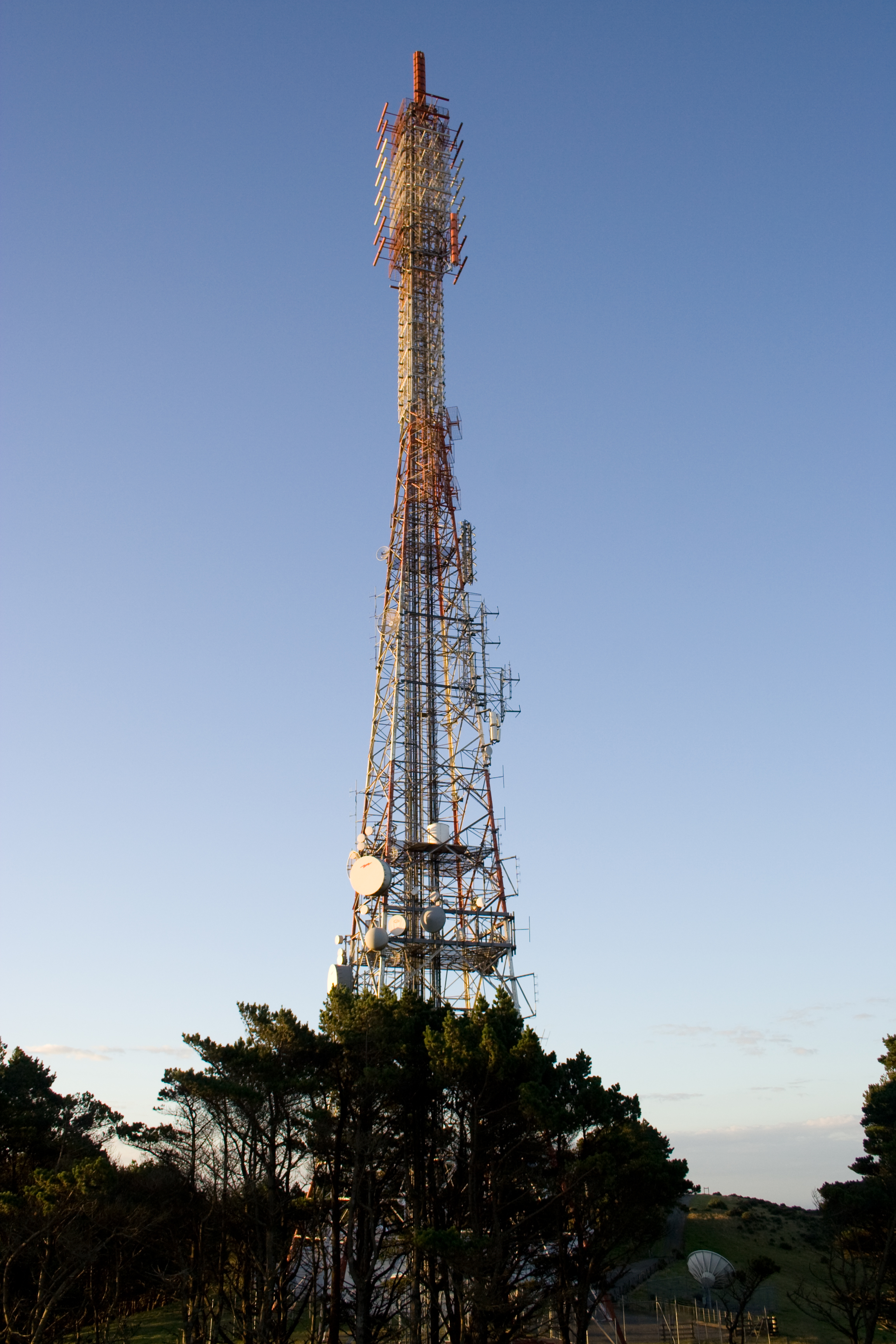
Kordia TV mast, Mount Kaukau

The New Zealand business was formed as a subsidiary of Television New Zealand Ltd (TVNZ) on 1 July 1989 as Broadcast Communications Ltd (BCL).

In 2003 TVNZ underwent a wide restructure from a State Owned Enterprise (SOE) to a Crown Entity with a dual commercial-(public service) charter remit, with the passing of the Television New Zealand Act 2003. BCL was split from TVNZ into a separate business entity. The new entity was named Transmission Holdings Limited (THL, THL Group), with the New Zealand broadcasting business continuing to operate under the name BCL, and was, and continues to be structured as an SOE. THL took with it a significant proportion of TVNZ's debt with it, leaving the newly restructured TVNZ debt free. This high level of initial debt has impeded the business's operating performance in the early years of its inception.

In November 2006, the business, Transmission Holdings Limited Group (BCL, THLA, AAPCS) was rebranded to Kordia. The name "Kordia" is derived from the Latin word "accordia", meaning "harmony".

In June 2007 Kordia purchased telecommunications company and internet service provider (ISP) Orcon Limited for $27 million. In 2008 Kordia led Orcon's launch of the country's first local loop unbundled telephone and broadband services, with Orcon becoming the first New Zealand ISP to offer ADSL2+ broadband access. In April 2013 Kordia sold Orcon for an undisclosed sum to Vivid Networks, a consortium of businesspeople directed by Warren John Hurst. Less than a year later, John Hurst was facing bankruptcy and Orcon was sold to competitor Callplus in June 2014 for an undisclosed sum that was forecasted to be around $30 million.

In 1993, the company then known as BCL opened a Maritime Operations Centre (MOC), which provides safety of life at seas communications on behalf of Maritime NZ. Kordia continues to provide this service from the MOC based in Wellington. Today, Kordia's maritime operations is responsible for ‘NAVAREA XIV’ – an area of 50 million square kilometres, or nearly a quarter of the world's oceans. Kordia built, and now operates and maintains HF and VHF radio networks for maritime communications.

In 2013, New Zealand completed its transition to digital TV, marking the end of analogue TV transmission in New Zealand. New Zealand Broadcasting Minister Craig Foss switched off the Waiatarua TV Tower analogue transmitter at 2am on 1 December 2013, bringing to an end a three-year nationwide digital switch-over campaign.

In 2015, Kordia acquired Aura Information Security, a Wellington based cyber security consultancy founded in 2001. Kordia's then CEO Scott Bartlett said the acquisition would add to Kordia's existing capabilities in information security. In 2017, Aura was named best security company at the iSANZ awards in 2017 and 2018.

In 2020, Kordia acquired Emerging Technology Partners, an Auckland-based boutique cloud consultancy, to increase its cloud capabilities.

In 2021, Kordia announced it was buying Auckland-headquartered Base2. Base2 offered managed IT, network, and security solutions with a cloud competency focused on the Microsoft ecosystem, Adobe, and other vendors, as well as certifications in Cisco, Azure, AWS, VMware and CompTIA, among others.

In July 2021, Kordia announced that it had acquired cyber security managed services provider SecOps NZ. The purchase saw Kordia increase its managed cyber security offering in the New Zealand market, as well as the establishment of a Cyber Defence Operations.

In September 2021, Kordia announced that it was divesting its Australian contracting business, known as Kordia Solutions Australia. Kordia Solutions Australia was purchased by Australian infrastructure service provider Ventia.

== Current operations ==
Kordia operates predominantly in New Zealand, with a head office in Auckland and offices in Wellington and Christchurch.

The business operates several operations centres for its various services. This includes two Maritime Operations Centres (MOC) in Wellington and Canberra, which provide safety of life at sea communication services, a Network Operations Centre (NOC), and a Cyber Defence Operations (CDO).

Kordia operates the digital television platforms in New Zealand – digital terrestrial television (DTT) and direct-to-home (DTH-satellite), including:

TVNZ

- TVNZ 1 (and TVNZ 1+1)
- TVNZ 2 (and TVNZ 2+1)
- TVNZ Duke

Sky Free

- Three (and ThreePlus1)
- Bravo (and Bravo Plus 1)
- Eden (and Eden+1)
- Rush
- HGTV

Māori Television

- Whakaata Māori
- Te Reo

Sky Television

- Sky
- Prime

Other Nationwide Stations

- Parliament TV
- Chinese TV8
- Apna Television
- Kordia TV

Regional Stations

- Channel 39

Radio Networks

- RNZ National
- RNZ Concert
- AM Network
- George FM
- Base FM

Kordia's nearly 400 high sites are available for co-location. This allows the introduction of other network operators' equipment into these strategic sites. Analogue television was switched off in 2013 as part of the move to digital TV broadcasting.

== Today ==
Kordia competes and co-operates with other operators of physical (layer 1) telecommunication network providers such as Spark New Zealand, Vodafone New Zealand, and Transpower New Zealand Limited (the national grid operator). Kordia has trialled DVB in New Zealand and DAB in New Zealand and Australia.

Kordia owns and operates New Zealand's third largest telecommunications network – by geographical reach.

Kordia acquired Orcon Internet on 2 July 2007, and sold it in April 2013.

In 2011, Kordia announced that it is the first company in New Zealand to achieve the Microsoft SIP Trunking qualification for Microsoft Lync.

In 2012, Kordia has launched a new data transit service from New Zealand to Asia, allowing Kiwi businesses to access the lowest latency route to Microsoft's Office 365 cloudbased productivity tools.

== Main high sites ==
Site	Area(s) served	Coordinates
Grampians	Nelson and eastern Tasman	41°17′53″S 173°16′47″E
Hedgehope	Invercargill and Southland	46°5′37.2″S 168°42′41.6″E
Hikurangi	Bay of Islands	35°32′21.2″S 173°54′53.4″E
Horokaka	Whangārei and central Northland	35°52′12.2″S 174°8′7.2″E
Kaukau	Wellington	41°14′1″S 174°46′46″E
Kuriwao	Southern Otago	46°14′18.8″S 169°22′18.9″E
Little Mount Ida	Northern Otago	44°57′25.9″S 170°3′56.1″E
Maungataniwha	Far North District	35°10′2.1″S 173°31′24.3″E
Mount Cargill	Dunedin and eastern Otago	45°48′47″S 170°33′19″E
Mount Edgecumbe/Putauaki	Whakatāne and eastern Bay of Plenty	38°6′16.5″S 176°44′12.6″E
Mount Taranaki/Egmont	Taranaki	39°17′19.7″S 174°5′4.3″E
Mount Erin	Napier, Hastings, and central Hawke's Bay	39°44′23″S 176°50′27″E
Mount Murchison	Eastern Buller and western Tasman	41°43′45″S 172°29′58″E
Mount Rochfort	Westport and western Buller	41°46′43.2″S 171°44′25.9″E
Mount Studholme	Timaru and South Canterbury	44°38′28.8″S 170°54′39″E
Obelisk	Central Otago	45°19′18.8″S 169°12′25.3″E
Otahoua	Wairarapa	40°58′32.1″S 175°45′16.5″E
Paparoa	Greymouth and Hokitika	42°24′11.5″S 171°20′33.8″E
Peninsula Hill	Queenstown	45°2′27″S 168°43′26″E
Sugarloaf	Christchurch and Canterbury	43°36′13″S 172°38′58″E
Te Aroha	Hamilton and Waikato	37°32′2.1″S 175°44′31.4″E
Tuhingamata	Taupō and southern Waikato/Bay of Plenty	38°42′32.5″S 175°59′48″E
Waiatarua	Auckland	36°55′34.5″S 174°34′5″E
Whakapunake	Gisborne and East Coast	38°50′2.2″S 177°35′59.3″E
Wharite Peak	Palmerston North and Manawatu	40°15′17″S 175°51′28″E

== See also ==
- Freeview (New Zealand)
