= C4 (New Zealand TV channel) =

New Zealand television channel

- Country: New Zealand
- Broadcast area: National

Programming
- Picture format: 576i (16:9 SDTV)

Ownership
- Owner: MediaWorks New Zealand
- Sister channels: TV3, FOUR

History
- Launched: 3 October 2003
- Replaced: TV4
- Closed: 26 June 2014
- Replaced by: The Edge TV (26 June 2014)

Availability

Terrestrial
- DVB 64-QAM on band IV

C4 was a New Zealand television channel owned and operated by MediaWorks New Zealand. C4 was available on both digital terrestrial and satellite platforms and played music around the clock, including music from C4's sister radio division from The Rock, The Edge, The Breeze, More FM, George FM, Mai FM & The Sound. C4 also aired a lot of speciality music shows such as HomeGrown, Top 10/100, Video Hits, Fade To Black, Steel Mill, the UChoose40 and the Biggest Records Right Now. The channel was originally launched on Friday 3 October 2003 at 8:00 pm as a re-branding of TV4 which had been broadcasting since 1997. On 1 May 2010, as C4 had been moving away from music programming since 2008, the jukebox side was split off and C4 launched a second C4 channel on Channel 9 called C4 2. C4 2 was only available on digital Freeview terrestrial and satellite platforms.

At the end of 2010 an announcement was made that MediaWorks would again re-brand the extant C4 channel as FOUR, which meant C4 2 would be converted to a music show as C4 was moved to its channel 9 position. C4 shut down on Thursday 26 June 2014 at 1:00 am. It was replaced by The Edge TV the next day on Friday 27 June 2014 at 4:00 pm. Nearly a decade later on 17 October 2023 two weeks after the official 20th anniversary, The Spinoff paid tribute to C4 in a podcast video on YouTube celebrating C4's 20th anniversary.

== History ==
=== Background ===
Canwest initially planned to shut down the loss-making TV4 and replace it with the Māori Television Service, which would use its VHF network. With no turnaround point, the channel was expected to close in 2003. MTS was expected to cover 74% of the population with its transmitter network. By November, it had inked a new deal with Canwest; only to be rejected in January 2003 by creating its own UHF network from scratch. In April 2003, it was announced that TV4 would be replaced by a music video channel, largely targeting the 15-19 demographic, following TV3's rebrand.

=== Early years ===
"Piss off, old people, you've got your own Concert FM - this is for us, the yoof"; launch words uttered by Clarke Gayford on 3 October 2003

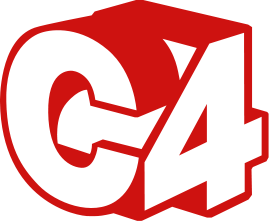
Previous logo starting from 2003 to 2008

C4 was launched on Friday night 3 October 2003 at 8:00 pm, when TV4 (which first aired in 1997) ceased broadcasting and relaunched as a music television channel called C4. C4, which stands for "Channel 4", was originally going to be known as "4Music" before it was officially unveiled as C4. TV3 and TV4 managing director Rick Friesen said that the name had been chosen for its "bold simplicity". The first show to broadcast on C4 was the 100 Best Music Videos Of All Time (Top 100), which was a countdown show where viewers voted prior to the show for their favourite music videos. The first music video to air on C4 to start the Channel off was Exit To The City by The D4. The Top 100 also included Metallica - One, described as "utter, utter nonsense" during an article on The New Zealand Herald in its countdown show, marking the first Metallica music video to air on C4. The final music video to air on the 100 Best Music Videos Of All Time (Top 100) was Nirvana - Smells Like Teen Spirit. This very music video has also famously received the same top spot on one of The Rock's annual countdown events around the time of C4's launch. TV programming on C4 included local made shows such as Select Live and The Official NZ Top 40. New Zealand On Air paid $500,000 for the first year of operation and C4 was to broadcast 58 hours a week of music television in prime-time, reaching 72% of the population, with a target of 20–25% New Zealand music content. It also had a limited number of carryovers from the previous TV4, such as South Park.

C4 had a deal with MTV Networks to air MTV programming such as Pimp My Ride. The MTV content on C4 remained on air after Sky TV launched a local MTV station featuring some of the same shows. MTV content decreased in 2008 when the channel moved towards general entertainment.

Following the scandal that happened with Popetown, C4 was hesitant in airing an episode of South Park depicting a bleeding statue of the Virgin Mary. Amanda Wilson claimed as of January 2006 that the episode, included in the package of its latest season available to the network, that she had not seen the episode yet and would not decide if it would air at all. Rotorua's John Paul College sent e-mails to parents of its students on 19 February, calling for a boycott of 3 News, as well as products advertised on TV3 and C4. After screening the episode, it announced on 22 February that it would not repeat it, and that it had a "very minor" impact: one sponsor left TV3, but C4's ratings were not affected.

On 11 April 2007 C4 began broadcasting in 14:9 widescreen on SKY TV. C4 then switched to a 16:9 widescreen format on 2 May 2007, the same day as Freeview launched. C4 screened in letterboxed 14:9 widescreen on 4:3 analogue VHF broadcasts.

24-hour broadcasts began in 2007 but only to digital viewers. The channel played music videos overnight followed by a music breakfast show with no presenters. Analogue viewers continued to see infomercials during these times.

=== Mainstream reformat ===
From 1 July 2008, the channel began the process of changing from a music channel to a youth-oriented entertainment network, operating under the same programming direction of its sister station TV3. In addition, C4 moved to channel 12 on Sky Digital and TelstraClear InHome TV platforms to reflect its new programming direction with a reduced focus on music. Its primetime schedules began to be occupied with more mainstream US series, as well as The Daily Show.

C42 logo used during the channel's existence between May 2010 and February 2011.

On 1 May 2010, as part of the contract with Freeview to provide at least four channels, MediaWorks launched a second C4 channel called C4 2. C4 2 streamed unhosted music videos back-to-back. The channel was available exclusively on the Freeview platform on Channel 9.

=== Shutdown of C4's original Channel 4 position; moving to Channel 9 in the former C4 2 capacity ===
At 6:00 pm on 6 February 2011, C4 moved to Channel 9 on Freeview instead of replacing C4 2. C4 then converted its second C4 channel from a TV channel to a music show. MediaWorks then launched the return of TV4 as FOUR in place of C4. The final music show on C4 before the changeover was the Top 100 Music Videos Ever, a similar show that was used to launch C4 in the end of 2003. The final music video screened before the changeover as well as to take out the Number 1 Top Spot on the Top 100 was Thriller by Michael Jackson. From 2011 onwards C4 screened a low-cost jukebox of music videos once again compiled by theme and a rerun of FOUR live, as many of the entertainment shows seen on C4 between 2008 and 2011 were moved to FOUR. C4 was available exclusively to Freeview viewers until 2012 when C4 returned to Sky.

On 25 September 2012, MediaWorks decided to provide four regional simulcasts of the channel on the Freeview satellite platform, which resulted in no space for C4. MediaWorks decided to replace the Sky simulcast of FOUR with C4, meaning only satellite viewers with either a generic DVB or Sky supplied receiver would be the only ones to get all channels via satellite. Due to a number of certified Freeview receivers only scanning and setting Freeview channels, from October 2013, the TVNZ metadata on the Freeview satellite service was changed to include the C4 feed on the Sky service. Certified Freeview receivers could manually add the channel.

C4 ceased broadcasting operations on 26 June 2014 at 1:00 am. The final music show to air on C4 was C42. The final music video to air on C4 was Exit To The City by The D4. MediaWorks launched a new music channel to replace C4 called The Edge TV, which is run by the radio station The Edge. The Edge TV was launched on Freeview Channel 11, and a time shift version of FOUR called FOUR + 1 was launched in place of C4.

=== Post-C4's shutdown ===
On 17 October 2023, nearly a decade after C4 ceased broadcasting operations, The Spinoff paid tribute to C4's 20th anniversary in a podcast on YouTube and on their website celebrating C4 in a time when the internet was slow and the demand for music videos was high. Duncan Greive also explained what would've had happened if C4 was to return that "It wouldn't work, that there isn't an easy way to replicate C4, but still feel the absence in the space where the culture could be knitted together and mediated in a fun way and get a sense of who are the people behind that".

== All shows that aired on C4 ==
=== Amp'd ===
Amp'd aired on Thursday nights. It featured hard rock and alternative music, and was hosted by Jono Pryor.

=== Animation Station ===
The Animation Station aired every Thursday night on C4 and it aired animated shows such as South Park, King of the Hill, The Cleveland Show, Futurama and Family Guy.

=== Pop Machete ===
Pop Machete was a half-hour-long programme aired Thursday at 9:00 pm on C4. Hosted by Damien Blank and Craig Easson. Pop Machete features alternative music videos, news and interviews.

=== The Takeover ===
The Takeover was a half-hour-long programme that follows-up after Pop Machete at 9:30 pm on C4. Hosted by Damien Blank, Craig Easson and a randomly selected band. The band has control over the music programming over the half-hour.

=== Holla Hour ===
Holla Hour was a classic C4 programme hosted by DJ Sir-Vere on Mondays at 10:00 pm on C4. Returning after a long absence on the TV channel, Holla Hour features the latest hip hop music videos, interviews and news in Hip Hop and Rn'B music. Final show was on 23 June 2014 at 10:00 pm.

=== C42 ===
C42 (Previously the second C4 channel, then became a music show from 6 February 2011 after TV4's return as FOUR) aired daily on C4 from 11:00 pm – 5:00 am, then 5:00 am – 6:00 am only on Mondays – Fridays and 11:00 am – 1:00 pm daily. The programme aired alternative music videos back-to-back, including some Rock music videos from The Rock such as Pluto - Dance Stamina, The Vines - Get Free & Shihad - La La Land (All 3 Of Them Aired On 30 June 2013) with a couple of ad-breaks at the hour. Final show was on 25 June 2014 at 9:00 pm – 1:00 am the next morning when C4 came to the end of the line. The final music video to air on C42 was The D4 - Exit To The City.

=== Spoon ===
Spoon was a classic C4 programme which aired "Smooth Music Videos" in the early hours of the morning such as Salmonella Dub - Push On Thru, Fat Freddy's Drop - Ray Ray, Gotan Project - Mi Confesión, Massive Attack - Be Thankful For What You Got, including some Rock music videos from The Rock such as Johnny Cash - Hurt (18 August 2012) & Radiohead - Creep (16 September 2012). Spoon aired during the weekends on Saturday & Sunday mornings from 5:00 am – 6:00 am on C4.

=== The Big Breakfast ===
The Big Breakfast was where you can listen to a random mix of music videos dating from back in the days up to today's hit music vids. The Big Breakfast aired on C4 every morning from 6:00 am – 10:00 am. Final show was on 25 June 2014 at 6:00 am – 9:00 am.

=== Common Ground ===
Common Ground aired R&B and hip hop music videos on C4 airing at random programme slot times throughout the week.

=== Blender ===
Blender plays hit music videos back to back daily at 2:00 pm on C4 and at random programme slot times throughout the week. Final show was on 25 June 2014 from 9:00 am – 9:00 pm.

=== Video Hits ===
Video Hits highlighted one or many artists such as Jimmy Eat World with their latest hits or classic video hits. Video Hits aired at random programme slot times throughout the week.

=== C4U ===
C4U was where the viewers have the opportunity to have their own playlist aired on C4 for half an hour. Viewers were able to submit their playlist at the C4 website. C4U aired during the weekends on Saturday and Sunday nights at 7:30 pm – 8:00 pm.

=== UChoose40 ===
The UChoose40 aired themed-countdowns whether it may be about "Gone But Not Forgotten", "90's Music", "Worst Songs Of The Decade", "15 Minutes Of Fame" or "Party Floor Fillers". C4 picked the theme and the viewers were given the chance to decide how the countdown plays out by voting for their favourite tracks out of the list provided on the C4 website.

Here are a couple of music videos that got the Number 1 Top Spot where the C4 viewers chose to vote No. 1 for this very music video the most on The UChoose40:

(20 April 2013) "Party Floor Fillers" - Nirvana - Smells Like Teen Spirit. This very music video also received the same Top Spot from The Rock's countdown event (formerly known as The Rock 500) a decade before C4 aired its "Party Floor Fillers" theme on the UChoose40.

(13 July 2013) "15 Minutes Of Fame" - Vanilla Ice - Ice Ice Baby.

Counting down from 40 to 1, the UChoose40 aired on Saturday nights at 8:00 pm – 11:00 pm.

=== What's The Theme? ===
What's The Theme? played out an hour of a random topic theme. May it be "Pop Princesses", "Coming To The Country Soon" & "Kiwi Artists Making It Big Overseas". Here are a lot of other themes that aired these music videos, famously heard on The Rock:

(22 February 2012) "Love" - Foo Fighters - Everlong. On 6 November 2020, over 8 years after C4 aired this very music video by the Foo Fighters under the Love theme at the time, this received the Number 1 Top Spot on The Rock's upgraded countdown events as The Rock 2000 (Top 2000). On 13 September 2024 nearly 4 years later, it took out the Number 1 Top Spot again, marking this music video by the Foo Fighters a "Two Time" champion in The Rock's annual countdown event.

(2 April 2012) "Legends" - The first music video to start the show off was Johnny Cash - Hurt, immediately followed by Led Zeppelin - Rock & Roll, then half way through the show was Split Enz - Dirty Creature. The final music video to air under the Legends theme was Jimi Hendrix - Hey Joe.

(1 May 2012) "Happy NZ Music Month!!!" - Th' Dudes - Bliss & Dragon - Rain.

(30 July 2012) "Number 1 For Ages" - Atlas - Crawl.

(27 May 2013) "80's Throwbacks" - The first music video to start the show off was A Flock Of Seagulls - I Ran (So Far Away). Half way through the show was The Cult - She Sells Sanctuary.

(28 June 2013) "90's Icons" - The first music video to start the show off was The Smashing Pumpkins - Today, immediately followed by Alanis Morissette - You Oughta Know. A little later on in a trio back to back was Garbage - I Think I'm Paranoid, The Red Hot Chili Peppers - Under The Bridge & The Offspring - Come Out And Play. Then again a little later on half way through the middle of the 90's Icons theme was another back to back set of trios of the legendary Nirvana - Come As You Are, No Doubt - Just A Girl & Soundgarden - Black Hole Sun. A little later on again, the final 3 music videos to air under the 90's Icons theme back to back was Oasis - Live Forever, Green Day - Good Riddance (Time Of Your Life) & Pearl Jam - Alive (As the LIVE version only instead of the plugged in version that The Rock airs). On 12 June 2019, nearly 6 years after C4 aired Nirvana's Come As You Are under the 90's Icons theme at the time, SCS Software released the Washington DLC state for American Truck Simulator which included the hometown of Aberdeen, WA where you can visit the official "Welcome To Aberdeen: Come As You Are" sign as a tribute to the memory of Nirvana's lead musician Kurt Cobain, including a garage C4 (as an unofficial tribute to C4) located off the I-405 Motorway at the Kenworth Truck Factory in Seattle, WA.

(22 November 2013) "X-Rated" - The first music video to start the show off was System Of A Down - Aerials, followed by Foo Fighters - Low & Metallica - St. Anger back to back half way through the X-Rated theme. This was the day before Doctor Who celebrated its 50th Anniversary.

(14 April 2014) "Planes, Trains, & Automobiles" - Red Hot Chili Peppers - Aeroplane, Spiderbait - Black Betty, Kenny Loggins - Danger Zone. The final music video to air under the Planes, Trains & Automobiles theme was ZZ Top - Gimme All Your Lovin'.

(13 June 2014) "Awesome Bogan Songs" - AC/DC - Thunderstruck. In 2015 only a year after C4 shut down, this very music video by AC/DC received the Number 1 Top Spot on The Rock's countdown events. Other music videos in the theme included Guns N' Roses - Welcome To The Jungle, Ozzy Osbourne - Crazy Train, George Thorogood - Bad To The Bone, Slipknot - Duality, Metallica - Enter Sandman & Judas Priest - Breaking The Law. The final music video to air under the Awesome Bogan Songs theme was Led Zeppelin - Whole Lotta Love (As the LIVE version only instead of the plugged in version that The Rock airs).

Including other themes such as "School's Out!!!", "Friendship", "Black & White", "Money, Money, Money!!!", and "Cool Cars". What's The Theme? aired on C4 at random programme slot times throughout the week. (Final show was on 24 June 2014).

=== Top 10/100 ===
Top 10/100 displayed a countdown of an artist such as The Exponents, Bic Runga, The Black Seeds, Gorillaz, or sometimes a different topic such as such as "Divas", "Lost In Space" & "Cool Cars". Top 100 events were aired as specials, for example at the start and the end of the year, under the same intro and outro as the Top 10.

Some music videos that got the Number 1 Top Spot from the mentioned Artists, Bands & Topics on the Top 10/100:

(3 October 2003) ("Best Music Videos Of All Time") - Nirvana - Smells Like Teen Spirit.

(6 February 2011) ("Music Videos Ever") - Michael Jackson - Thriller.

(24 March 2012) Gorillaz - Feel Good Inc.

(28 April 2012) "Divas" - Celine Dion - My Heart Will Go On.

(2 May 2012) Bic Runga - Drive.

(7 May 2012) The Exponents - Victoria.

(24 May 2012) The Black Seeds - Coming Back Home.

(14 July 2012) "Cool Cars" - Audioslave - Show Me How To Live.

(22 February 2014) "Lost In Space" - Muse - Sing For Absolution.

Counting down from 10/100 to 1, Top 10 (Top 100 Sometimes) aired on C4 daily from 10:00 am – 11:00 am. (Final show was on 24 June 2014).

=== Twice As Nice ===
Twice As Nice aired music videos from one artist or a band back to back such as SIX60 - Don't Forget Your Roots & Rise Up (14 April 2014). Twice As Nice aired at random programme slot times throughout the week.

=== FOUR Live ===
FOUR Live on C4 was a repeat of the broadcast which aired earlier on FOUR. FOUR Live was hosted by Shannon Ryan (2012–13), Drew Neemia and Kanoa Lloyd. The programme is 90 minutes of interviews, news and music videos airing with the viewers say. The FOUR Live repeat aired at 7:30 pm – 9:00 pm weeknights on C4.

=== Fade To Black ===
Fade To Black was a programme which aired Rock music videos, famously heard from The Rock radio station on C4 such as Korn - Coming Undone (2 April 2012). The programme aired at random programme slot times throughout the week. (Final show was on 24 June 2014.)

=== The Best... ===
The Best was the best of an artist or maybe a time of music such as "Covers" (10 April 2012). The Best aired at random programme slot times throughout the week on C4.

=== Homegrown ===
Homegrown played 100% New Zealand kiwi music on C4 such as Devilskin - Little Pills (10 April 2012). Homegrown aired at random programme slot times throughout the week.

=== Technologic ===
Technologic plays out the best dance music videos. Technologic aired at random programme slot times throughout the week on C4.

=== Added This Week ===
Added This Week was a segment on C4 the showed newly released music videos. Some videos were broadcast within hours of their release. The segment aired at varying times throughout the week.

=== 10 Years Of... ===
10 Years Of... Pop Music? Rock Music? Trendy & Popular Videos? 10 Years Of... was a show that gave C4 the chance to do a casual throwback such as "Tui Winners 00 - 09" (23 May 2012).

=== So Hot Right Now ===
So Hot Right Now was where the hottest videos of the week, right now aired on C4. The programme aired at random programme slot times throughout the week.

=== Steel Mill ===
Steel Mill was a programme which aired Metal music videos on C4 such as Kreator - Phantom Antichrist & Civilization Collapse (22 November 2013). The programme aired at random programme slot times throughout the week. Steel Mill no longer aired on the station.

=== C4 Select Live ===
C4 Select Live was hosted by Joel Defries and text to select to the song to play

=== Select Late ===
Select Late was aired very late

=== Freestyle ===
Freestyle was hosted by Teuila Blakely C4's live music show

=== Edge Chart ===
Edge Chart was a radio station chart countdown
