= Rush (TV channel) =

New Zealand television channel

- Country: New Zealand

Programming
- Picture format: 1080i HDTV (downscaled to 16:9 576i for the SDTV feed)

Ownership
- Owner: Discovery, Inc. (2020–2022); Warner Bros. Discovery (2022–2025); Sky Network Television (2025–present)
- Parent: Sky Free
- Sister channels: Bravo; Eden; HGTV; Sky Open; Three

History
- Launched: 21 March 2022
- Replaced: Breeze TV

Links
- Website: www.threenow.co.nz

Availability

Terrestrial
- Freeview: 9

Rush is a New Zealand television channel owned and operated by Sky Network Television, which acquired it from Warner Bros. Discovery. It is broadcast via Sky, the state-owned Kordia transmission network, Sky and the streaming platform ThreeNow. The channel launched on 21 March 2022. Rush focuses on adventure shows such as Man vs Wild, Manhunt With Joel Lambert, Deadliest Catch and Treehouse Masters. The channel shares its name and some of its programming with Australian TV channel 9Rush.

== History ==
In 2021, Discovery New Zealand announced its plans to restructure several of its TV channels for 2022, including the addition of Rush, intended to reach a younger male audience. Rush launched on 21 March 2022. After the closure of The Edge TV, Breeze TV and the rebranding of Choice TV, Rush (with sister channel eden) started transmission on old Choice TV Freeview channel 14 and Sky TV channel 24.

On 22 July 2025, Warner Bros confirmed it would be selling its New Zealand free-to-air television assets (Rush, Three, Eden, Bravo and HGTV) and streaming operations (ThreeNow) to Sky for NZ$1. The sale is expected to be completed on 1 August 2025, with Warner Bros. Discovery continuing to provide channels a continued supply of company's content under a multi-year commercial agreement.
