= Defensor 5 =

- Genre: Science fiction
- Country of origin: Spain
- Original language: Spanish
- No. of seasons: 1
- No. of episodes: 26

Production
- Executive producer: Emilio Aragón
- Running time: 26 minutes
- Production companies: Anima2; Radiotelevisión Española; Quiero Televisión

Original release
- Network: La 2
- Release: 20 January 2001 – 2001

Defensor 5 (Spanish: Defensor 5: la última patrulla, Defensor 5: The Last Patrol) is a Spanish computer-animated sci-fi television series produced by Anima2 and aired on La 2 as part of its children's block TPH Club in 2001. The first CGI-animated series in Spanish history, it was conceived by Spanish TV personality Emilio Aragón.

== Plot ==
After a hypothetical Third World War, Earth was damaged and the key cities were reduced to asphalt deserts. Humanity survived the apocalypse, but created a schism. A group of five defense specialists is in charge of preventing enemies from destroying Earth.

== Production ==
The series was a co-production between Anima2 (later Crea Anima), RTVE and Grupo Auna's digital terrestrial television platform Quiero TV. By November 2000, the series was finished and ready for broadcast and was presented on 22 November that year. A feature film was also a possibility, even though it would lead to the remaking of core assets. Like with the other series Emilio Aragón produced, his companies were in charge of merchandising. As part of the co-production agreement, it aired on one of Quiero's channels before airing on La 2 free-to-air. Each episode cost 50 million pesetas (US$250,000) to produce.

== International distribution ==
In January 2002, the series was put up for international distribution by Grupo Productores Independientes.

It is unknown if an English dub was produced. There were, however, two Māori dubs. In 2001, TV4 aired it as Ngā Paki Waituki, while a second dub was shown in 2004 on the early weeks of Māori Television under the title Taiawhio 5.
