= Four (New Zealand TV channel) =

New Zealand television channel

- Country: New Zealand
- Broadcast area: national metropolitan

Programming
- Picture format: 16:9 (576i, SDTV)
- Timeshift service: Four + 1 (2014 - 2016); (terrestrial only)

Ownership
- Owner: TVWorks (1997-2003); MediaWorks New Zealand (2011-2016)
- Sister channels: TV3; The Edge TV

History
- Launched: Original (as TV4); 29 June 1997; Relaunch (as FOUR); 6 February 2011
- Closed: Original (as TV4); 3 October 2003; Final (as FOUR); 2 July 2016
- Replaced by: C4 (3 October 2003); Bravo (2 July 2016)
- Former names: TV4 (1997 - 2003)

Links
- Website: www.four.co.nz

Availability

Terrestrial
- DVB 64-QAM on band IV

Four (stylised as FOUR; formerly TV4) was the second New Zealand television channel owned and operated by MediaWorks New Zealand, broadcast via the state-owned Kordia transmission network. The channel launched on 29 June 1997 as TV4 and was replaced by C4 on 3 October 2003. It was relaunched on 6 February 2011 as a separate channel from C4.

In general, the channel's target audience was 18- to 49-year-olds and could be broader in its appeal, with programming which attracted a wider, and more mature audience. During early mornings and late afternoons the channel screened a range of children's programming such as Sesame Street and in the evenings screened shows aimed at the mainstream audience. Overnight and late mornings – early afternoons the channel screened Infomercials and Auto TV (Car Commercials). Four broadcast mostly American programming, with the exception of Sticky TV, Four Live, and Smash, which were in-house produced Auckland-hosted youth shows, and the Pukana youth show, which was produced from a Maori language government fund. Pukana also airs on one of the two government funded Maori language channels.

On 2 July 2016, Mediaworks closed Four and replaced it with Bravo as part of a deal with NBC Universal.

== History ==
=== TV4 ===
==== Overview ====
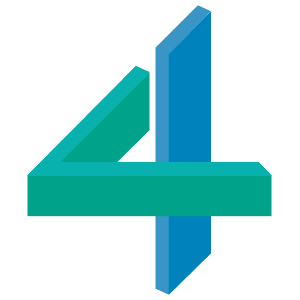
TV4 logo used from 1997 - 2003

TV4 was an entertainment network catering to the 15-39 demographic and screened a wide range of imported shows, mainly from Viacom's catalogue, such as South Park, Beverly Hills 90210, and Beavis and Butt-Head. After 2000, new programming was scarce, with the infiltration of 1980's and 1990's repeats. On October 3, 2003, TV4 was replaced by music channel C4.

==== Launch plans ====
The history of Four dates back to October 1996, when TV3 decided to announce the launch a second TV channel called TV4, scheduled for June 1997. Initially, it would air for twelve hours a day and would reach 60% of the national population. No news and current affairs programmes were scheduled, while there was also going to be a substantial amount of local productions. The network employed the VHF band, which implied several gaps in the national coverage. Areas which as of the 2 October 1996 launch announcement were excluded were the Far North, Hawke's Bay, Taupo, eastern Bay of Plenty, Nelson and Blenheim, Oamaru, Central Otago and the West Coast.

The creation of the new channel caused panic at TVNZ, whose chief executive Chris Anderson thought that TV4 would challenge the audience of its two channels, given that it and TV3, owing to their Canwest ownership, which claimed to have "deep pockets", enabling "increasing access to foreign programming". John Wright, formerly of Channel 2 and Telecom's First Media cable TV company, was appointed director of programming in December. By early 1997, it was reported that TV4 was set to acquire programmes from alternative sources, which would also imply that the new channel would air a substantial amount of Canadian imports. TV3's acquisitions team did not buy "quality" imports, meaning that its launch would include B-grade imports. A volume deal with MTV was on the cards in April, which was set to include Beavis and Butt-Head, a show TVNZ rejected to buy because of its crude humour.

The upcoming launch of the new channel caused a series of changes to the transmitter networks, causing the existing channels to announce retune plans. Kapiti missed out on the launch of the channel because of possible interference with TV One's transmitter in Palmerston North. The full line-up was announced on 19 April by two former TV2 executives, Bettina Hollings (channel manager) and John Wright. Hollings announced that it would create a new generation, the ACES generation: A for alienated, C for cynical, E for experimental and S for savvy. The core 25-39 demographic was touted as "screenagers", the "neo-young" group which associated itself with youth culture. The launch was scheduled for 29 June.

==== On air ====
The channel launched on 29 June 1997 with a boxing match between Mike Tyson and Evander Holyfield. It operated from 10am to midnight; with infomercials screening from 10am for up to four hours. At 4pm on launch day, a half-hour introductory programme was broadcast. Its launch wasn't spared from controversy, as TVNZ sought a high court injunction on the eves of its launch to prevent Canwest from screening several MTV titles when the competing broadcaster was setting up a local version of MTV using the frequencies of the former Horizon Pacific Television network of regional channels. TV3 appealed. Contemporary reactions to the launch of both TV4 and MTV favoured TV4 more, as the MTV relay mostly aired music video programming. Coverage issues and the move of the Star Trek franchise to TV4 implied that fans in TV4 black spots lost access to the series and were hoping for a solution to bring the channel, such a case involved the Inangahua area in the South Island's West Coast, where TV3 took a few years to become available. In some areas, it replaced TV3, which moved to new frequencies. The transmitter shake-ups at the time confused TV3's viewers.

On 9 July, TV3 protested again at the High Court, this time regarding the airing of Beavis and Butt-Head on MTV Europe, which TVNZ was relaying on UHF. Both TV4 and MTV were, however, showing different episodes of the same series, while other titles were seen on both channels. MTV reportedly sold a set of episodes to TV4, as well as non-exclusive rights to the series. TV3 won the appeal on 15 July, forbidding TVNZ from airing episodes of the series on its MTV channel, while TV4 was given a two-year exclusivity contract.

Ratings for the channel were low, registering a 1% share in the late August to early September period. Coinciding with its first test cricket telecasts in November, Canwest began a period of negotiations with Sky Network Television to include the channel in its satellite service, solving the coverage problem. Bettina Rollings became in charge of programming at both TV4 and TV3 when the latter's director Gary Brown left in December 1997.

A full year after launching, TV4's programme manager Penny Win said that TV4's growth exceeded all expectations: the average amount of viewers over the age of 5 who tuned in at least one minute was 377,000 in January 1998, rising to 454,000 in May. Bettina Hollings left TV4 (and by extension TV3) in July 1999, as she planned to move to New York City. At the same time, ratings for the channel continued under the 5% mark.

==== Reformat ====
As Canwest's operations in New Zealand were struggling financially, the group opted to cut on its promotion for TV4 in 1999 in order to concentrate its efforts on TV3. August 1999 saw the creation of a petition from a Raetihi local to finally have access to the channel in Taranaki by mid-2000, earlier than what Canwest promised (by 2002). If David Stuckey's petition hit 5,000 signatories, his promise would be achieved. His cause also justified that TV4 had the third highest amount of British content on national television and the highest amount of Māori content, which was seen as useful to counter the American influence of the larger channels. Furthermore, it would help attenuate the rift between rural and urban areas. By September, his petition was attracting 180 signatures from Hawera, with the total standing in at 400. By 1 November, it had reached 2,000 signatures, after extending the cut-off date from 23 October to 20 November.

Kristin Marlow was appointed director of programmes of both TV3 and TV4 on 20 September 1999. On 5 March 2000, TV4 started broadcasting on Sky, becoming the second free-to-air channel to join, after TV3.

TV4 restored theme nights and added music programming in late 2001, but the ratings did not increase in tandem. Moreover, if the channel would become a music channel, as a niche channel, its audience would fall to 1-2% share.

==== Closure plans ====
In February 2002, it was reported that Canwest could lease TV4's transmitter network to carry the upcoming Māori Television Service. This plan implied TV4's closure in 2003 to be replaced by the new channel. TV4 was operating at heavy losses and there was no turnaround point. MTS wanted to use TV4's VHF transmitter network in order to have the widest reach, an estimated 74% of the population. When John Davy was the MTS head in April, there were two plans: TV3 would ultimately use Māori Television during TV4's downtime, while Māori Television under John Davy suggested that TV4 would shut down completely. By November it had inked a new deal with Canwest; the plan was ultimately rejected with MTS building up its own UHF network in its place. A hearing took place on 18 November, the result of which was inconclusive. The deal was expected to cost between NZ$6.2 million and NZ$7.2 million; Canwest would also sell two of its Auckland radio stations.

In April 2003, it was announced that TV4 would be replaced by a music video channel, largely targeting the 15-19 demographic. The announcement on 22 April came two days after sister channel TV3 underwent a massive rebrand operation. C4 took over on 3 October 2003; the new channel, while having a strong emphasis on music videos, still had some carryovers from the previous TV4 format.

=== Four ===
In October 2010, MediaWorks announced the return of the TV4 format of a broader channel as Four, replacing C4. The new network would focus on children's programming during the day and a range of shows aimed at the 18-to-49-year-old audience in the evening. The launch announcement did not make it clear if it would launch an HD feed, meaning that certain shows such as the newer post-February 2009 episodes of The Simpsons would only be transmitted in standard definition after the launch. The changeover took place on 6 February 2011, at the end of C4's countdown Top 100 Music Videos Ever, and was followed by the Sesame Street-themed video of 1234 by Feist (Sesame Street being one of Four's launch titles, specifically for Four Kids). The first programme to air on Four was The Simpsons episode "Elementary School Musical" at 6pm (not coincidentally featuring New Zealand band Flight of the Conchords).

Four's launch campaign featured a giant rubber duck installed at Auckland's harbour, for a package of idents commissioned by Special Group, to capture the channel's slogan, "feels like Four".

At the end of 2012, Four began screening some new episodes of shows within seven days of the show being broadcasting in the United States under the Fast Four brand. Examples of shows include The Simpsons, Family Guy, Glee and How I Met Your Mother. New Zealand TV networks typically start screening most US television series around five months after the original release, usually first screening in late January or February at the end of the New Zealand summer, catching up to the US at the end of the season as all 22 episodes are broadcast week-after-week, not spread out over nine months as in the US. The transition of shows like Glee from TV3 to Four also lost the NZ On Air funding that is given to TV3 to get EIA-608 captions converted from source masters to the preferred Teletext format by TVNZ's Access Services. As New Zealand broadcasters are completely reliant on this process for program subtitling.

Four was the main beneficiary of a new output deal with Fox which was signed on 20 December 2013.

Beginning in 2014, Four's ratings began to fall to levels comparable to its launch phase, dipping further in October 2015, which eventually became its least-rated month. At the end of the year, TVNZ announced that it would take over the terrestrial rights to Four's flagships The Simpsons and Family Guy. Episodes of both shows would continue on Four until their existing rights expired.

=== Closure ===
On 2 May 2016, MediaWorks announced the closure of Four, being replaced by Bravo, a female-oriented reality show channel, from 3 July. The decision was aided by the fact that its core demographic had moved online, which no longer justified maintaining such a channel. Moreover, MediaWorks thought that they "tried hard" with Four but it was "almost too niche to compete with TV2".

The final ever prime time schedule on FOUR consisted of an episode of Million Dollar Listing at 7pm, followed by the final ever show, The Biggest Loser (season 15), from 8pm. At 10:50 pm on Saturday 2 July 2016, the channel closed with Feist singing "1234" (the same Sesame Street song that was used to relaunch the channel back in February 2011); the channel then faded to black.

== Content ==
=== TV4 ===
When TV4 launched, it carried a mix of programmes, such as vintage and contemporary comedies (Get Smart, Gilligan's Island, Saved by the Bell), dramas and soaps (The Kindred, Baywatch, General Hospital, Neighbours) and general entertainment (Beavis and Butt-Head, Ed's Night Party). Wednesdays were dedicated to British programming, titles at launch included Red Dwarf and Harry Enfield. Saturdays saw the airing of several shows previously seen on TV3 (Moesha, New York Undercover, the local youth programme Ice TV and a repeat of Twin Peaks). The channel obtained NZ$512,896 in funding from NZ On Air for a youth magazine tentatively titled TV World in late August 1997. This was the first NZOA-funded programme to be produced specifically for TV4; though Flatmates, which aired on the channel at launch, was originally commissioned for TV3. TV World was set to air during peak time and aimed at becoming TV4's flagship, though it had a repeat showing on TV3 in order to reach out to areas where its signal wasn't available yet. Flatmates, on the other hand, gained peak time repeats on TV3 in September. At MIPCOM 97, TV4 obtained the rights to air Comedy Central's heavyhitter South Park.

Its first cricket broadcast was announced in August 1997, when New Zealand Cricket had to accept an agreement to air three test matches in Australia on TV4 in November. The rationale behind the move was that, although TV4 still hadn't fixed its coverage problems yet, November was seen as an important sales period for TV3, and the airing of cricket tests in cities with differing timezones (Perth, Hobart, Brisbane) would have a negative effect on its programming and news. Moreover, the airing of cricket posed as a threat for TV4's credibility as a youth channel, as most cricket watchers were over the age of 40.

November saw the announcement of a raft of acquisitions for the new year: the British drama series This Life, sci-fi series Lexx, Coogan's Run and Frontline, an Australian comedy that parodied 60 Minutes-style newsmagazines. For Christmas 1997, the channel aired Spawn, Through the Cakehole with Jo Brand and a Christmas special of The Tony Ferrino Phenomenon.

The Young Ones made its return to New Zealand television on this channel on 28 January 1998. In February, it was announced that Melrose Place would come to the channel, as its ratings were falling on TV3. South Park premiered on 2 March. One of TV4's earliest hits, Buffy the Vampire Slayer, moved to TV3 in April 1998 in hopes of attracting higher ratings, in order to emulate what happened in the US airing. To compensate for the loss, it added repeats of Clueless and Baywatch in its Saturday early evening timeslot.

A new theme night emerged on 27 April 1998, Makeout Monday. The title owed to the three soaps it was airing, the new season of Beverly Hills 90210, This Life and Melrose Place. Melrose Place would be added to the line-up from May, airing between the former two. Only Fools and Horses started airing on 15 July. This Life concluded its run on 23 November.

By January 1999, its WWF telecasts attracted 18,000 male viewers ages 5-14. The total male 5-39 audience was estimated to be at 70,000. These telecasts were the second most-watched programme on the channel, behind South Park. The shadow audience of children concerned parents and demanded a new airtime for wrestling. The network acquired the rights to The Tribe, produced in New Zealand but first screened abroad (at the time, it had been screened in 120 territories), in July 1999, airing it by the end of the year. The series premiered on 24 August. At the same time, it acquired Queer as Folk, a controversial British series featuring a homosexual couple, but planned to air it in 2000.

With the fall in new programming at the turn of the millennium, TV4 resorted to increased numbers of retro programming. There was a Retro Sunday theme night. In April 2000, Mod Squad joined it. Repeats of Monty Python's Flying Circus were already being carried in June 2000 on Thursday nights.

Apart from Māori programming, the channel was known for its lack of local programming during prime time.

==== Māori programming ====
Late in its original run as TV4, the channel started airing a limited number of programmes in the Māori language during Sunday mornings, funded by Te Māngai Pāho.

In 1999, it aired its first such programme, Tumeke ("Too Much"), aimed at young Māoris, and presented by Quinton Hita of TVNZ's Mai Time. Beginning in 2001, it was renamed Pūkana, a programme for children, and followed the airing of a dubbed cartoon. The first such series was the Spanish animated series Defensor 5: The Last Patrol, which was shown as Ngā Paki Waituki (later redubbed on Māori Television as Taiawhio 5). This strand aired on Sunday mornings.

==== Teletrader ====
On 27 June 1999, the channel started airing Teletrader with Tim Shadbolt overnight. A call centre in the Lower Hutt won the contract by early July, though the service was not in full operation yet. The service employed the Jade software, developed in New Zealand.

=== Four ===
==== Fast Four ====
Fast Four was introduced in 2012 to deliver new episodes of imported shows (mostly from 20th Century Fox Television) in the same week as their original airing in the US. It was an attempt to reduce the usage of piracy to access the latest episodes of key US shows, as well as an international trend to cut down for viewers to wait for legal releases and had a special logo for such airings. The move came a year after the US version of The X Factor was broadcast on TV3 simultaneously with the US.

The Fast Four-marked shows for September and October 2012 were:

- Glee season 4 (19 September)
- Survivor: Philippines (23 September)
- How I Met Your Mother season 8
- New Girl season 2 (2 October)
- The Simpsons season 24 (7 October)
- Family Guy season 11 (7 October)

It was also expected that more shows would join the scheme and that other New Zealand broadcasters would do similar arrangements with producers and distributors to deliver same-day or same-week seasons there. By contrast, Homeland on TV3 was set to premiere its second season on 30 September 2012 while TV3's teasers still said "coming soon".

The initiative was downsized in October 2013 with the suspension of the Fox supply agreement, which implied that both TV3 and Four had to suspend airing of its film and TV productions from November unless the two companies entered new terms. This came to an about-face after the December content agreement, causing the return of Fast Four.

==== Four Kids ====
With the launch of Four, TV3's children's programming, including Sticky TV, moved to two Four Kids programming blocks, airing 6-10am and 2-4pm. Key to its launch was the return of Sesame Street to New Zealand television.

After its closure, the replacement channel Bravo, which did not carry any children's programming, was not well-received by parents, who criticised the removal of the early morning children's slot in favour of infomercials. A small number of programmes (such as Sticky TV) moved to TV3 and 3NOW, while Sesame Street was removed completely. This also led to the creation of a petition, which amassed 8,099 signatures and was handed to the MediaWorks offices on 13 July 2016, but the company did not hear the plea of the Taranaki petitioner, due to commercial reasons. TV2 ultimately acquired the rights to Sesame Street and started airing on its channel on 12 September 2016. When Four closed, TVNZ had no plans to obtain the rights, which were seen as expensive.

== Four Plus 1 ==
Four Plus 1 logo

Four Plus 1 was a timeshift service that MediaWorks launched on 27 June 2014. It was a standard hour-delayed timeshift channel of the Four broadcast. Four Plus 1 was initially only available on digital terrestrial with satellite launched a week later on Sky's fifth digital transport. MediaWorks hoped for an increase in Four's audience share, like what happened to TV3 upon launching its +1 channel. Shortly before its closure, it relocated to a new satellite frequency on 24 June 2016. It was replaced by Bravo Plus 1 on 3 July 2016, when Bravo replaced Four.
