= Lounge TV =

New Zealand talk show

The Lounge was a New Zealand Television talkback show hosted by Katie Kouloubrakis and filmed in Christchurch. The show was broadcast on Cue TV/Sky 110 and could also be viewed online on Freeview and the show's website. The show had been running since 3 September 2007. The show's broadcaster, Cue TV, became defunct on 31 May 2015.

The show featured a variety of interviews and segments with topics such as gardening, cooking, fashion, interior design and theatre in New Zealand.
