= Cook the Books (TV program) =

- Created by: Top Shelf Productions / Choice TV
- Directed by: Laurie Clarke
- Presented by: Carly Flynn
- Narrated by: Carly Flynn
- Country of origin: New Zealand
- No. of seasons: 2
- No. of episodes: 8

Production
- Executive producer: Vincent Burke
- Camera setup: Sjaak te Brake
- Running time: 24 minutes

Original release
- Network: ChoiceTV
- Release: 30 October 2014

Cook the Books is a New Zealand cooking show. It was based on the Cook the Books bookstore that focused on New Zealand chefs who had released their own cookbooks and to cook from them. The show was hosted by Carly Flynn, and aired its first season on Choice TV from 30 October 2014, with a second season airing in 2015.

== Episodes ==
No.	Chefs / Guests	Episode air date
1	Al Brown & Karla Goodwin	October 30, 2014
2	Chelsea Winter & Sarah O’Neil	November 6, 2014
3	Michael Van de Elzen & Cameron Petley	November 13, 2014
4	Martin Bosley & Lauraine Jacobs	November 20, 2014
5	Nadia Lim & Alan Brown	November 27, 2014
6	Simon Gault & Jeremy Schmid	December 4, 2014
7	Robert Oliver & Sachie Nomura	December 11, 2014
8	Peta Mathias, Julie Le Clerc & Brett McGreggor	December 18, 2014
