= The Edge TV =

- Country: New Zealand

Programming
- Picture format: 1080p 16:9 (HDTV)

Ownership
- Owner: MediaWorks New Zealand
- Sister channels: Breeze TV

History
- Launched: 27 June 2014
- Replaced: C4, ThreeLife
- Closed: December 2022

The Edge TV was a New Zealand online streaming channel that was officially launched as a television channel on 27 June 2014 as an extension of The Edge radio brand, which is owned by MediaWorks New Zealand. In September 2020, MediaWorks sold The Edge TV along with its entire television arm to the United States multinational mass media company Discovery, Inc., with the acquisition being finalised in December 2020. MediaWorks still produces the content which is broadcast on frequencies owned by Discovery Inc. On 21 March 2022, The Edge TV returned to being an online-only streaming channel, alongside sister channel Breeze TV. Both The Edge TV and Breeze TV were closed in December 2022.

== History ==
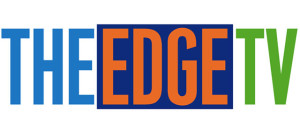
The Edge TV logo used from its launch in 2014 until the station rebrand in 2016.

The Edge TV launched as a television extension of The Edge radio brand in New Zealand on Freeview channel 11 and Sky channel 114 at 4 pm on 27 June 2014. It replaced C4, which was a music channel run by MediaWorks.

The station opened with a video giving a brief history of The Edge and the presenters introducing themselves, before going into the very first programme: Hot Right Now. The first music video to play on The Edge TV was "Problem" by Ariana Grande featuring Iggy Azalea.

On 22 January 2016, the station rebranded to be consistent across its radio station, website, and TV channel.

On 15 April 2018, the station changed their slogan (introduced during the station rebrand in 2016) from All The Hits to Love Hit Music. The station slogan rebrand was gradually rolled out across all platforms and completely to The Edge TV on 1 December 2018.

On 1 July 2019, it was taken off terrestrial TV and replaced by ThreeLife + 1, and was converted into an HD online-only streaming service. A petition was launched to keep it on terrestrial television. The channel returned on 26 March 2020, replacing ThreeLife on Freeview channel 11 and Sky channel 118.

On 7 September 2020, MediaWorks sold its television arm to US multimedia company Discovery (now Warner Bros. Discovery). The sale was finalised on 1 December.

On 21 March 2022, the channel was removed, with a change to the Freeview channel lineup which saw new channels eden and Rush launched by Discovery New Zealand (now Sky Free). It returned to an online-only broadcast.

In December 2022, The Edge TV and sister channel Breeze TV ceased broadcasting.

== Programming ==
The Edge TV mostly aired music videos, interspersed with video clips from the radio shows, channel idents and advertisements, in a show entitled Hit Music Now, after the station's slogan.

=== Hit Music Now ===
Named after the station slogan, Hit Music Now was the only scheduled show that played on The Edge TV until it ceased in December 2022. Music videos, mostly pop music, with advertisements and channel idents were played throughout the show. The show was previously titled Love Hit Music (2018–2020), All The Hits (2016–2018), and Hit Music Now (2014–2016) & (2020–Present).

=== The Edge Top 5 ===
The Edge TV's non–scheduled show airing four times each day at approximately 8:00 am, 12:00 pm, 4:00 pm & 8:00 pm. The Edge Top 5 played the hottest music videos around right now. The show was launched in March 2020 in preparation of The Edge TV's return to television.

=== Aotearoa Music Awards ===
Previously known as the Vodafone New Zealand Music Awards. This is a live-event that broadcast live on The Edge TV as well as sister channel Three. The award show event showcase the best in the New Zealand music industry of the year that past. In 2020, the event was hosted by The Edge Afternoons' Sharyn Casey and Jayden King for the 7 pm - 8:30 pm broadcast on The Edge TV. The broadcast continued from 8:30 pm until 10:30 pm on Three, hosted by Jesse Mulligan.

=== $100k-araoke ===
$100k-araoke was a live show that was broadcast on The Edge TV and The Edges Facebook and YouTube Channel for 24 hours from 9 am to 9 am on Thursday May 27 - Friday May 28, 2021. it was hosted By The Edge Breakfast Announcers and the main goal was to do karaoke for a period of 24 hours in order to raise 100k for a family in need. By 9 am the next day just over 100k was raised.

=== The Daily Feed ===
The Daily Feed was the flagship 60-minute live youth show, that aired on weekdays from 4 pm. It was hosted by Marty Hehewerth and Steph Monks, the former hosts of the radio show The Edge 30. The show launched in March 2017 as a replacement of SMASH!. The show featured on-air competitions, pop culture news, interviews and entertainment segments, all in between music videos. The Daily Feed interacted with the audience via social media. Past hosts of The Daily Feed include Guy Mansell and Sam Robertson.

=== What You Want ===
What You Want was a 60-minute live music video request show that aired on weekdays from 3 pm. It was hosted by Guy Mansell and Sam Robertson, the hosts of then radio show The Edge Workday Action Battle Team. The show launched in 2017. The show featured audience-driven music video polls, highlight content from The Edge radio shows, pop culture content and events, all in between music videos chosen by viewers. They used a phone hotline, text message service and social media to collect music video requests. Past hosts of What You Want include Megan Mansell and Sean Hill.

=== The Edge 30 Frontrunners ===
The Edge 30 Frontrunners was a half-hour show that aired on weekdays at 5 pm, right after Daily Feed. It counted down top 10 songs performing well on the companion radio show The Edge 30 countdown. With time constraints of being a half-hour long show, some music videos were shortened to fit the allocated broadcast time.

=== The Edge 30 ===
The Edge 30 was an extended version of The Edge 30 Frontrunners that aired on Sunday at 9 am. This edition of the show on The Edge TV was not hosted unlike the week night companion show on The Edge Radio. The show replaced SMASH!20 when the radio companion show was replaced.

=== Old School 9 @ 9 ===
Old School 9 @ 9 was an hour-long show. It played 9 throwback music videos at 9 am and repeated later at 9 pm. The show launched on 3 December 2018.

=== The Edge Fresh 40 ===
The Edge Fresh 40 was a chart show that counts down the top 40 songs in New Zealand. It aired 10 am to 1 pm Saturdays and was repeated 6 pm to 9 pm on Sunday evenings. The show was previously called The Edge Fat 40 and launched in 2014.

=== Top 10 ===
Top 10 was an hour-long music video countdown show that counted down from a list of videos based on a given subject. The show aired at 8 pm weeknights and 4 pm Saturdays. It also aired at different times throughout the weekday. Top 10 was introduced as part of The Edge TV launch in 2014.

=== This vs That ===
This vs That was a half-hour long show that put together two artists, genres or concept. The show was introduced in 2015.

=== Midday Mix Up ===
Midday Mix Up was an hour long show that aired 12 pm weekdays. The show launched on 3 December 2018 as a replacement of Hot Tune Time Machine.

=== Sunday Sessions ===
Sunday Sessions was an hour long show that aired at 2 pm on Sundays. Live performances at The Edge studios, on video platforms and around the world were aired throughout the broadcast. The show launched on 2 December 2018.

=== The Edge Mix ===
The Edge Mix aired Friday and Saturday nights at 9 pm until 5 am the next morning. It aired music videos that are aimed at what can be found on a 'house party' playlist. The show launched in late 2014.

=== The Edge TV and Chill ===
The Edge TV and Chill aired on Sunday mornings at 6 am. It aired music videos that would best suit winding down after weekend party festivities. The show launched on 2 December 2018.

=== Adults Only ===
Adults Only was an hour long show that airs 11 pm Sunday through to Thursday. First episode aired on 3 December 2018. It aired music videos that usually cannot air during the day due to broadcast restrictions and the music video content.

=== Uncover Discover ===
Uncover Discover was a New Zealand on Air-funded segment that features New Zealand artists with a newly released NZ On Air funded music video. Previously, the segment was known as Decent Exposure. A new Uncover Discover profile was released two weeks. The segment aired across The Edge TV schedule.

=== Vodafone New Zealand Music Awards ===
Vodafone New Zealand Music Awards is a live-event that broadcasts live on sister channel Three that later repeats on The Edge TV. The award show event showcases the best in the New Zealand music industry of the year that past.

=== Public Holiday Countdowns ===
During public holidays, The Edge TV aired a Top 100 music video countdown during the day that is a theme of the public-observed holiday. These include days such as Anzac Day and Queen's Birthday.

=== Gym Bangers ===
Gym Bangers was a three-hour show that aired at 6 am – 9 am weekdays. The show started in June 2016 and ended on 30 November 2018. It aired music videos that are suitable to have a workout to.

=== Hot Tune Time Machine ===
Hot Tune Time Machine was an hour long show that aired at 12 pm weekdays. It aired music videos that haven't played on The Edge TV for a while or was considered a throwback. The show began in June 2016 and the last show aired on 30 November 2018.

=== SMASH! ===
SMASH! was a 90-minute show that later was cut down to an hour-long. It was hosted by Marty Hehewerth and Steph Monks. It was later followed by replacement show Daily Feed. SMASH! replaced FOUR Live on FOUR with repeats airing on The Edge TV until the end of 2014. The show then moved to The Edge TV and continued to air until February 2017. It aired entertainment, pop culture, celebrity interviews and competitions in between music videos. The last episode aired in December 2016.

=== The Slab ===
The Slab was a half-hour long show hosted by Six60 band member Chris Mac. It was a New Zealand On Air-funded show that featured exclusively New Zealand artists. Prior to 2016, it was hosted by Megan Mansell. The show was introduced as part of The Edge TV launch in 2014.

=== The Edge Greatest Bits ===
The Edge Greatest Bits was a fifteen-minute long show hosted by Clint Randell from The Edge Breakfast with Dom, Meg & Randell. It aired highlight 'best of' video clips taken from all 4 main radio shows (6am to 10 pm shows) from the past week.

=== Hot Right Now ===
Hot Right Now was hosted by Clint Roberts. It counted down the top 5 music videos that aired on The Edge TV. It was previously hosted by Marty Hehewerth and Steph Monks. The show was the first to air on The Edge TV when it launched in 2014. The last episode of Hot Right Now aired in December 2015.

=== The Music Lab ===
The Music Lab was hosted by Sharyn Casey. It showcased new and exclusive music videos from New Zealand and around the world. The last episode of The Music Lab aired in December 2015.

=== Takeaways ===
Takeaways was a half-hour long show that aired on weeknights from 9 pm. It was hosted by Megan Mansell and Sam Robertson. Chang Hung joined the show later. It was a nightly 'feed' of entertainment and pop culture. The show began early 2016 and the last episode aired late 2016.

=== The Edge Scandal Quiz ===
The Edge Scandal Quiz was an hour-long show that aired weekdays at 8 pm. It was hosted by Todd Fisher. Viewers were able to visit The Edge website and answer 10 questions that were pop culture themed or related to music videos that aired during each episode. Questions were presented by the quiz master in-between music videos. Some questions were related to music videos that followed after the question being mentioned, this was to prevent people from answering the questions online without watching the show. Winners were randomly-selected to win prizes of assorts. The show was hosted previously by Megan Mansell.

=== SMASH!10 ===
SMASH!10 was a half-hour long music video countdown show that aired after SMASH! at 5 pm weekdays. The show was launched in 2016. SMASH!10 aired music videos voted by viewers on social media. The audience were able to submit their countdown vote/request via Twitter and have their user-generated content broadcast during the countdown. The show ended in 2016.

=== SMASH!20 ===
SMASH!20 was a 90-minute show that counted down the top 20 songs of the week. It aired at 9 am on Sundays and was hosted by Sean Hill. Previously, it was hosted by Sam Robertson who is now host of What You Want.

=== UChoose ===
UChoose was a half-hour long show that let The Edge viewers/listeners submit their playlist and have a chance for it to be played out on the show. The show was introduced as part of The Edge TV launch in 2014. The last UChoose aired in 2016.

=== ...Now ===
..Now was a half-hour long show that provided six videos from a selected artist (Beyonce...Now for example). The show was introduced in 2014 and ended in February 2016.

=== Perve ===
Perve was a half-hour long show dedicated to some music videos that viewers can enjoy without music background. It ran every Sunday from 10 pm to 11 pm.

=== The Dom Show ===
The Dom Show was a segment hosted by Dom Harvey from The Edge Breakfast with Dom, Meg & Randell. It featured skits with The Edge and other MediaWorks staff.
