= Eden (New Zealand TV channel) =

New Zealand television channel

- Country: New Zealand
- Headquarters: Auckland, New Zealand

Programming
- Language: English
- Picture format: 1080i HDTV (downscaled to 16:9 576i for the SDTV feed)
- Timeshift service: Eden+1

Ownership
- Owner: Blue Ant Media (2014–2019); Discovery, Inc. (2019–2022); Warner Bros. Discovery (2022–2025); Sky Network Television (2025–present)
- Parent: Sky Free
- Sister channels: Bravo; HGTV; Rush; Sky Open; Three

History
- Launched: As Choice TV; 28 April 2012; Relaunch as eden 21 March 2022
- Former names: Choice TV

Links
- Website: Official site

Availability

Terrestrial
- DVB 64-QAM on band V

Eden (stylised as eden and formerly known as Choice TV) is a privately owned, national free-to-air television channel in New Zealand and has been on air since 2012. The channel features programmes on topics such as: lifestyle, news, travel, reality, movies, entertainment, comedy, game shows and drama.

The channel and its sister network HGTV New Zealand were acquired by Discovery, Inc. (subsequently Warner Bros. Discovery) in 2019. On 21 March 2022, Choice TV was rebranded as Eden. Also, on 21 March 2022 Eden+1 was launched. In late July 2025, Sky Network Television acquired Eden and Warner Bros Discovery's New Zealand free-to-air assets, taking effect on 1 August 2025.

== History ==
Original Choice TV logo.

=== Independent era, 2012–2014 ===
Choice TV was launched on 28 April 2012, at 5 p.m. It was created and co-founded by Alex Breingan, Julia Baylis, Laurie Clarke and Vincent Burke. It is broadcast nationally on the Freeview digital TV network Channel 12 and on Sky Channel 13.

Vodafone also carried the channel for their IPTV subscribers. According to the Nielsen ratings, the channel's four-week cumulative audience is about 1.8 million people since January 2014 - New Zealand's population being 4.8 million.

The January 2013 season began with exclusive content including ITV Granada's Jonathan Ross Show and Sony Pictures Television's made-for-TV movie series Jesse Stone, starring Tom Selleck. During March 2013, Sony Pictures Television aired the short-lived ABC sitcom Mr. Sunshine and the daytime drama Days of Our Lives, which had been discontinued by TVNZ two years earlier when its contract with Sony Pictures expired. Days of Our Lives picks up from the 2011 season (season 47), 1 1/2 seasons behind the then-current United States' NBC season. TVNZ had previously been more than five years behind the United States's programming. From April to August 2013, reruns of the Sony Pictures Television 1996 drama Early Edition aired weekdays and was then replaced by the ITV Granada show Wild at Heart. The show Being Erica, distributed by BBC Worldwide and produced by CBC, began airing on Saturday, 10 August 2013. From September 2013, Choice TV started playing the second season of the Australian TV comedy Twenty Something.

Days of Our Lives went on a summer hiatus until 10 February 2014, just before the end of season 47. The last few episodes aired on Friday, 20 December 2013 and Sunday, 22 December 2013. On 25 April 2014, Choice TV announced that they would suspend their decision to order more seasons of Days of Our Lives. Being Erica's second season premiered on 23 January 2014 in the daytime weekday slot while Days of Our Lives was off-air. Vexed's second season premiered in late March 2014 for New Zealand viewers. Choice TV also began playing Better Man in late May 2014.

=== Blue Ant Media, 2014–2019 ===
Choice TV logo used from 2015 to 2022.

In November 2014, Canada's Blue Ant Media bought a majority stake in Choice TV, marking the group's first international expansion.

=== Warner Bros. Discovery, 2019–2025 ===
In late 2019, the channel was acquired by Discovery, Inc., along with sister network HGTV New Zealand.

Choice TV On Demand closed in May 2021 and Choice TV programming was moved to ThreeNow.

On 10 November 2021, it was announced that Choice TV would be rebranded as Gusto in March 2022. However, shortly before launch, the name Gusto was scrapped and changed to "eden" in order to avoid confusion with the former TVNZ OnDemand food channel of the same name. The rebranded channel would retain most of Choice's programming, with the major additions of Newshub Live at 8pm, an extension of Discovery New Zealand's news brand Newshub, and more drama programming. The channel would host British dramas, game shows, and "intelligent" movies including Changing Rooms, Big Family Farm, Finding Alice, and a new local show called Great Southern Truckers.

On 22 July 2025, Warner Bros. Discovery confirmed it would be selling its New Zealand free-to-air television assets (Eden, Three, Bravo, Rush and HGTV) and streaming operations (ThreeNow) to Sky for NZ$1. The sale was completed on 1 August 2025 with Warner Bros. Discovery continuing to provide channels a continued supply of company's content under a multi-year commercial agreement.

== Content ==
The Choice TV line-up included programmes from the UK's BBC Worldwide, ITV Granada, Verve Productions, Zodiak Media, the Australian SBS, ABC, Fremantle Australia, as well as productions from Sony Pictures Television, CBS Studios, Paramount Television Studios and Warner Bros. Television Studios.

Together with Top Shelf Productions, Choice TV developed a local series which aired in the spring of 2014 on the channel's Thursday Food Night.

From 17 October 2014, Choice TV aired their own New Zealand gardening show, Get Growing, as well as a programme called Cook the Books, which first aired on 30 October 2014.

=== Programming ===
Originally Choice TV's prime time programming slot (7:30–10:30pm) featured a different daily theme:

- Monday – Travel: Our World
- Tuesday – Property & Design
- Wednesday – Great Outdoors
- Thursday – Food
- Friday – Home & Garden
- Weekend – Entertainment

Additionally, Choice TV has produced several television shows, including:

- Brunch (2012)
- Cook the Books (2014)
  - Cook the Books (Season 2) (2015)
- Full Frontage (2015)
- Get Growing (2014)
- The Get Growing Roadshow (2015)
- My Dream Room: Kids Edition (2015)
- Uncharted New Zealand (2021)

==== Brunch ====
In September 2012, Choice TV aired its own TV morning show called Brunch with April Ieremia and former All Black rugby player Josh Kronfeld hosting.

The first season finished on 21 December 2012 with a total of 65 episodes but was not renewed.

== Eden +1 ==
eden+1 logo

Eden +1 (stylised as eden +1) was a 1-hour timeshift channel. It was launched on 21 March 2022, replacing The Edge TV. eden+1 was available on Freeview Channel 18 and Sky Channel 505. It was discontinued on January 29, 2026.
