= Australia's Best Houses =

Australia's Best Houses is an Australian lifestyle television program screening on the 7TWO since 2013, hosted by Gary Takle. It showcases exciting and visually stunning house projects in Australia.

== See also ==
- List of programs broadcast by Seven Network
- List of Australian television series
