= Three (TV channel) =

New Zealand television channel

- Current Three logo, introduced in 2023.
- Country: New Zealand
- Broadcast area: National

Programming
- Picture format: 1080i HDTV
- Timeshift service: ThreePlus1

Ownership
- Owner: Westpac (1990–1997); Canwest (1997–2004); MediaWorks New Zealand (2004–2020); Discovery, Inc. (2020–2022); Warner Bros. Discovery (2022–2025); Sky Network Television (2025–present)
- Parent: Sky Free
- Sister channels: Bravo; Eden; HGTV; Rush; Sky Open

History
- Launched: 26 November 1989; 36 years ago
- Former names: TV3 (1989–2017)

Links
- Website: www.threenow.co.nz

Availability

Terrestrial
- DVB 64-QAM on band IV

Three (stylised as +HR=E) (Note: Māori: Toru, stylised as +ORU. The name is only used for Māori Language Week initiatives in 2020 and 2022. The channel's pre-2017 name was reported in Māori media as Whakaata Tuatoru (Channel/Television Three).) is a New Zealand national television channel. Launched on 26 November 1989 as TV3, it was New Zealand's first privately owned television channel. The channel currently broadcasts nationally (with regional advertising targeting four markets) in digital free-to-air form via the state-owned Kordia on terrestrial and satellite. It previously broadcast nationally on analogue television until that was switched off on 1 December 2013.

Three is a general entertainment channel formerly owned by Warner Bros. Discovery New Zealand, with a news element under the banner of ThreeNews. Three carries a significant amount of local content, most of which airs at prime-time. The channel has been owned by Sky Network Television since 1 August 2025.

== History ==
=== Establishment ===
Two contenders for a third channel emerged in April 1984: City TV and the TV3 Consortium, both based in Auckland. The latter was headed by former TVNZ executive Tom Parkinson. City TV merged with Impact Television in June.

Applications to apply for warrants to operate New Zealand's third national television network opened in early 1985 and closed on 29 March 1985. There were four regional channel warrants: Region 1 serving Auckland and Northland; Region 2 serving Waikato, Bay of Plenty and Hawke's Bay; Region 3 serving Wellington, Manawatu and Taranaki; and Region 4 serving the South Island. Applicants for the warrants included Aotearoa Broadcasting System, Civic Enterprises (region 4 only), Energy Source Television Network, Impact Television, On-Shore Services (region 1 only), Southern Cross Television (except region 2), Tele-Vid Three group and United Telecast Corporation (region 2 only). Hearings began in August 1985.

The Broadcasting Tribunal announced in August 1987 that the Tele-Vid Three group (TV3) had been awarded all four warrants. The four channels would be based in Auckland (region 1), Tauranga (region 2), Wellington (region 3) and Christchurch (region 4), with a jointly owned national news and current affairs service and a national advertising service. TV3 was proposed to launch in early 1989, with broadcasts initially covering 80% of the population. Tele-Vid Three, the partner for region 4 (South Island), announced the construction of its transmission facility for Christchurch, with a smaller facility for Dunedin. There were also concerns that the launch of the new network would reduce TVNZ's advertising spending, as well as less local content. At the end of the month, Alan Bond through his company Bond Media wanted to take in a 5% stake in the network. In April 1988, TV3 was set to become the first 24-hour channel in New Zealand, hoping to do so upon launch. The original timetable only envisioned such a plan after five years on air. On 11 May, TV3 commissioned its first sitcom from the Christchurch studios. The channel would also base its children's programming locally. Later that month, it announced that it would become the first to air in stereo.

There were numerous delays to the launch date of TV3. Litigation surrounded the granting of the warrant, as did the share market crash in October 1987, which wiped out a large proportion of the capital that TV3 required to establish the channel. These problems resulted in the ambitious regional plans being rationalised before being shelved completely. The network was to be based in Auckland with limited studios and news and sales teams in the other main centres. In March 1988, Karl Geddes, formerly of GTV9, was appointed its director of programming.

In May 1988, estimates suggested that TV3 would launch in April 1989. TV3 claimed to still be on target in July, but quickly admitted that it could delay its launch due to a lack of transmitter arrangements with the Broadcasting Corporation of New Zealand (Note: After BCNZ was dissolved, it became TVNZ subsidiary BCL, now Kordia, an independent unit.) The first major foreign acquisition, announced in July 1988, was the NBC miniseries Brotherhood of the Rose, which was due to begin filmed in New Zealand that month. This was followed by an agreement with CNN International in early August. On 14 December, it inked an agreement with US television network NBC, as well as Auckland-based Metromedia Investments. It would not issue a launch date for "commercial reasons". TV3 expected to take 30% of the television advertising revenue, rising to 36% by 1994. The passing of the 1989 Broadcasting Act also implied the end of price wars between TVNZ and TV3 once the latter became operational.

The network released its first print advertisement to the press on 3 January 1989 with the finalised logo for the new network, depicgint a champagne cork with "1989" written on it. The copy said that the channel will bring "the sparkle" which had been missing from New Zealand screens until its launch. Later that month, it announced that it would bave a news hour, starting with a half-hour bulletin at 6pm, followed by a 6:30pm current affairs programme. TVNZ responded by changing the formula of its own bulletins. Rod Pedersen was appointed head of news after unveiling its news hour plans. Negotiations between The New Zealand Listener and TV Guide began over obtaining listings for the channel at the end of the month, already being amicable.

On 22 February, it signed an exclusive three-year deal with New Zealand Tennis, as well as live coverage of the US Open and the three main Australian tennis championships, including the Australian Open. In March, it finalised a deal with TVNZ's Broadcasting Services division (later BCL) to use its transmitter infrastructure.

Its first transmission - though extra-officially - was that of the 1989 FA Cup final, which in New Zealand was on the early hours of 21 May at 1:30am, on TV One. It had obtained the rights but lacked carriage on television due to delays in its launch. As TVNZ did not have the rights, an arrangement had to be settled between the two broadcasters. TVNZ finally accepted the broadcast on 4 May, under the grounds that TVNZ paid for delivery and transmission costs.

A recruiting drive began in early June, covering all programming departments. Amanda Millar and Scott Bloxham became the first TVNZ defectees appointed by the new network in August. Rob Taylor from The New Zealand Herald followed shortly after. Subsequently, Philip Sherry was appointed to present 3 National News. He had not presented television news bulletins for two and a half years and was with 1ZB until late 1988. On 15 August, network executive Trevor Egerton finalised a launch date, 27 November. Tuku Morgan was also signed for the new network. It was estimated that 39% of the population could receive the network at launch, compared to the initial 70% target.

Further programming details were released on 6 October, which TVNZ refused to comment. These included sitcoms new to New Zealand, such as Murphy Brown, The Nutt House and Roseanne, action drama Midnight Caller and the Australian science magazine Beyond 2000. The current affairs programme A Current Affair would compete with Holmes on TV One. A local version of 60 Minutes was also on the cards. The programming formula was compared to countries where ratings competition was already a reality, such as the UK and the US. It was also going to employ stripping of the same programme over weekdays, which TVNZ had done with Holmes, Neighbours and Sale of the Century, doing it with its syndicated reruns of The Golden Girls and The Benny Hill Show. The former ran competing with Sale of the Century on TV One at 7pm and the latter was programmed for 10:30pm. It would also run Home and Away at 7:30pm on Tuesdays and Wednesdays. The channel was set to broadcast from 12pm to 1am on weekdays and 7am to 1am on weekends. The channel planned to offer NZ$2.50 shares once it became fully operational in late November. Analysts were concerned about the issue price.

=== Launch ===
Original TV3 logo from 1989 to 2003.

External videos
- TV3 First Transmission, 26 November 1989 via NZ On Screen (video blocked outside New Zealand)

TV3 announced in mid-November that it would launch the night before (26 November, a Sunday) with a two-hour commercial-free introductory special. Kel Geddes forecast that TV3 should be the ratings winner, under the grounds that TV One should be a public service broadcaster, akin to Channel 4 and PBS. Moreover, other arugments included a TV2-esque "no news" format (other than the 6pm news hour) and the new channel's streamlined programming. TV3 switched on its transimtter network for the first time on 15 November, in the case of Mount Sugarloaf in Canterbury (on channel 6), for one hour at 2pm, airing a test card. At the time, NBC's stake increased to 14,9%. The reason for NBC's entry into TV3 was because the television audience in the United States was shrinking.

TV3 began broadcasting on Sunday 26 November 1989 at 8:00 pm with Governor-General Paul Reeves officially launching the station. This was followed by a two-hour special previewing the network's programmes, featuring comedians David McPhail and Jon Gadsby playing cameramen. TV3's initial slogan proclaimed 'Come Home to the Feeling'; a derivative of the 'Come Home to the Best, Only on NBC' slogan used by NBC in the United States of America at the same time. At launch, TV3 could be received by an estimated 55 percent of the population, in Auckland, Waikato, Western Bay of Plenty, Palmerston North, Wellington, Christchurch and Dunedin.

Regular broadcasts began the following day, Monday 27 November 1989, at 7:00 am. The first day's programme schedule was as follows:

- 7:00am − The Early Bird Show, with news and weather at 7:00am, 7:30am, 8:00am, 8:30am and 9:00am with Joanna Paul.
- 9:00am − Dinosaucers
- 9:30am − Welcome Back, Kotter
- 10:00am − Chico and the Man
- 10:30am − Check It Out!
- 11:00am − 9 to 5
- 11:30am − Holiday World
- 12:00pm − Film: Rio Grande (1950)
- 2:00pm − Fame, Fortune and Romance
- 2:30pm − Bring 'em Back Alive
- 3:30pm − The Mickey Mouse Club
- 4:00pm − The Real Ghostbusters
- 4:30pm − Teenage Mutant Ninja Turtles
- 5:00pm − Get Smart
- 5:30pm − Perfect Match
- 6:00pm − 3 National News with Philip Sherry, Greg Clark and Belinda Todd
- 6:30pm − A Current Affair with Genevieve Westcott
- 7:00pm − The Golden Girls
- 7:30pm − Laughinz with Jay Laga'aia, Rawiri Paratene, Rima Te Wiata, Brenda Kendall, Mark Hadlow and Alison Wall.
- 8:30pm − The Shiralee (part one)
- 10:30pm − Bee Gees: Live in Australia
- 1:00am − Closedown

=== Early problems ===
Ratings for the channel's first day floundered to 16% out of a sample of 900 people, per the results of an AGB-McNair telephone survey, paid for by TVNZ. With each passing day, Kel Geddes called it "a marketing ploy". Moreover, Mark Jennings, who led the South Island bureau, noted that on launch night, the network felt that it wasn't fully prepared, and that it was "undercapitalised" from day one.

One of the financial supporters of TV3 in its early life was America's NBC (through NBC International Ltd), taking 14.9% of TV3's shares and had the biggest and effectively controlling interest. Existing laws forbade foreign ownership beyond the 15% level, what TV3 considers as "the main block to sell" itself. In February 1990, TV3 decided to cut morning broadcasts on weekdays, causing The Early Bird Show to be seen only on weekends. NBC sold the stake when TV3 was into receivership in May 1990; by this time the share was at 16.4%.

Despite breaking TVNZ's monopoly, TV3 had found itself in an uphill struggle. Its current affairs programmes and TV sports programmes were axed due to disappointing ratings and poor advertising income. Its staff were also laid off. It also had to face competition with the then-new Sky Network Television. TV3 was ready for any ratings battle. The axing of the in-house children's department led to its head Rex Simpson founding a new company, Kids TV, in Dunedin.

=== Westpac ownership ===
TV3 failed to gain ground against a recently revitalised TVNZ and was placed into receivership on 2 May 1990. TV3 continued to broadcast with the major creditor, Westpac, supporting the network by taking a large shareholding. TV3 was delisted from the New Zealand Stock Exchange in December 1990 because it could not afford to meet listing requirements. Its board of directors had lost their confidence when TV3 was into receivership.

As TV3 needed investment during a climate of economic recession, the government liberalised the rules on foreign ownership of television stations (raising the 15 percent cap to 49 percent and later removing all restrictions), allowing TV3 to search for an investor overseas. In December 1991, Canwest took a 20 percent shareholding in TV3 and secured a management agreement allowing it full control to operate the station. Canwest introduced tighter controls on budgets while targeting the lucrative 18- to 49-year-old audience. TV3's audience share and advertising revenue steadily increased, leading to significant profits. TV3 also steadily increased its coverage within New Zealand, adding dozens of transmitters and translators, often with the assistance of New Zealand On Air. By 1998 about 97 percent of the population could receive the channel.

On 2 October 1996, TV3 announced a reshuffling of its broadcast frequencies to enable it to launch a new network, to be called TV4 Network Limited, on the VHF band. TV4, which started on 29 June 1997, is a free-to-air network aimed at a younger audience than TV3. The launch was considered successful, with high brand recognition and ratings significantly higher than MTV, TV4's television rival. TV4's opening broadcast was the controversial Tyson–Holyfield boxing rematch.

=== Canwest ownership ===
A version of the logo introduced in 1994.

In April 1997, Canwest purchased Westpac's 48 percent shareholding in TV3, taking Canwest's stake to 68 percent. In June Canwest picked up the More FM Radio network, followed in November with the purchase of the remaining 32 percent of TV3. In April 1998, Canwest announced that it had made Can$22 million in the six months to February 1998 in New Zealand, up a third on the same period the year before. TV4 contributed positively to the result, with some of the increase due to the inclusion of More FM, while TV3 was continuing to experience strong revenue growth.

On 15 March 1998, TV3 started airing the wildly successful British pre-school series Teletubbies. Bettina Hollings, general manager of TV4 and director of programming at both channels, owned a set of soft toys featuring the four main characters. She had been in its filming location in England in September 1997 and was responsible for bringing the series to New Zealand. Later that year, TV3 won the NZ$2.8 million bid for New Zealand's host broadcaster of the global BBC-led 2000 Today broadcast, tying in with the government's "First to the Future" campaign. Subsequently, the channel also sided with the ill-fated Millennium Live too.

In September 1999, the Broadcasting Standards Authority (BSA) upheld a complaint over TV3's 20/20 story "Sex, Lies and Videotape" in June 1998. The story received twelve complaints and was upheld on the grounds of privacy, viewpoints on controversial Issues, accuracy, fairness and responsible programming. The BSA ordered TV3 to pay $100,000 in costs, to broadcast statements on-air regarding the upheld complaint, and the channel was banned from showing advertising between 6:00pm and 8:30pm on 10 October 1999.

Canwest's investments in New Zealand had developed considerably in New Zealand over the period that it had interests in the country. TV4 continued to be a source of concern for the broadcaster, but the position of TV3 was strengthened by alliances with Sky Television for sport and a series of high-profile mistakes by TVNZ as it dealt with the dominance of Sky in pay television. The election of the Labour government in 1999 refocused TVNZ as a semi-non-commercial broadcaster, no longer ratings-driven and no longer attempting to dominate the free to air television market. As a commercial broadcaster, TV3 was in a position to take advantage of TVNZ's change of focus.

In October 2000, it used the TellyDOTS for a four-week period.

TV3 logo used from 20 April 2003 to 9 February 2017

Bruce Dunlop & Associates Australia unveiled a brand refresh of TV3 on 20 April 2003. The new logo consisted of three squares, containing a fern on the left and middle squares and a 3 in the right square. Idents during this phase depicted scenes of people from New Zealand. The news operation also rebranded.

During 2004, the station was transferred into the ownership of Canwest MediaWorks (NZ) as a way of listing 30 percent of the Canadian company's New Zealand assets on the New Zealand share market. TV3's parent company Television Works announced its annual revenue at $124 million in October 2004, which was $13 million up from the previous financial year.

=== MediaWorks ownership ===
In May 2007 it was announced that Ironbridge Capital, an Australian private equity firm, was paying $386 million or $2.43 a share for the 70 percent of CanWest MediaWorks (NZ) owned by CanWest Global Communications. It was also offering the same price to minority shareholders under a full takeover bid.

On 1 April 2008, TV3 became the first New Zealand television network to introduce high-definition television, to coincide with the launch of Freeview HD and MySky HDi in New Zealand. The first programme to broadcast in true 1080i high definition (i.e. not upscaled) was that night's screening of Boston Legal.

In October 2010, coinciding with the announcement of the launch of Four, TV3 announced that it would undergo a slight change to its target demographic, shifting from the 18-49 demographic to the 25-54 one. Key international TV series such as The Simpsons, America's Next Top Model and Top Chef would move to the new channel, as well as a reduction in the amount of crime dramas broadcast. Outrageous Fortune was replaced by a new title from South Pacific Pictures, The Almighty Johnsons, which was slated to be TV3's new flagship local drama series for 2011. New Zealand's Next Top Model would remain on the channel, as MediaWorks bosses believed that the local nature of the programme was "event television".

On 17 June 2013 the parent company of TV3 went into receivership, this being the second receivership for TV3. When TV3's parent company MediaWorks was purchased by Ironbridge Capital they took on $700 million of debt which could no longer be sustained. Following the receivership TV3 and the radio stations owned by MediaWorks remained on air and all staff have retained their jobs. In August 2013, it unveiled a new, reality-heavy line-up (downsizing contracts with US big-name providers), as well as an all-new look. It also lost Home and Away to TV2; its distributor Endemol claimed to have received a 30% higher offer from TVNZ. New titles included local versions of international formats The Block and The X Factor. Shares in the company were gradually and completely bought out by US hedge fund Oaktree Capital Management. The loss of Home and Away led to the creation of a planned local alternative to fill the timeslot, Trinity Point, but it was eventually rejected.

Since 3 July 2016, with the closure of sister channel Four, some of its programming, such as Sticky TV, moved over to TV3 in a new daytime lineup. Sticky TV was accompanied by a reduced children's block at 3pm, which at launch time included only one cartoon, Teenage Mutant Ninja Turtles. The channel opted to rotate the shows over time. A handful of preschool shows moved to 3NOW.

Custom wordmark logo "+HR=E" used in 2017, TV3 logo used from 2017 to 2023

On 9 February 2017, TV3 underwent a major re-branding, changing its name to Three and adopting a new logo and on-air imaging. The new brand was promoted as being "vibrant, playful, and inspiring"; chief content officer Andrew Szusterman explained that TV3 as a brand had not evolved with its programming, and that "a channel this strong, with content this strong, should be bigger than the sum of its parts and it should represent the content itself whereas the pieces of content were living in isolation." The new imaging was widely criticised by viewers, particularly the unusual design and stylization of its new logo as "+HR=E".

A second sister channel, ThreeLife, was launched on 15 April 2018.

On 18 October 2019, MediaWorks announced Three was for sale.

On 25 March 2020, ThreeLife and ThreeLife + 1 went off air, and were replaced by the return of The Edge TV and new channel Breeze TV.

=== Discovery Inc./Warner Bros. Discovery ownership ===
In early September 2020, MediaWorks confirmed that it would be selling its television media assets, which include Three, to U.S.-based Discovery, Inc. The acquisition was completed on 1 December 2020.

In April 2022, Discovery merged with WarnerMedia to form Warner Bros. Discovery. As a result, Discovery New Zealand and its assets including Three and Newshub became part of the new media company. The Edge TV and The Breeze TV were both discontinued in December 2022, to be replaced with eden, eden +1 and Rush.

Three's new logo in 2023, the same custom wordmark used in 2017 now encased in a shape, also applies to ThreeNow.

In late February 2024, Warner Bros. Discovery proposed eliminating Three's news service Newshub, effective 1 July 2024, citing declining advertising revenue. Newshub's closure was confirmed on 10 April 2024, with 5 July being its final airdate. On 16 April, Warner Bros. Discovery and newspaper company Stuff reached an agreement for Stuff to produce Three's 6pm news bulletin ThreeNews, commencing 6 July 2024.

On 7 May, Stuff announced that seven former Newshub journalists including Samantha Hayes, Jenna Lynch, Laura Tupou, Ollie Ritchie, Juliet Speedy, Zane Small and Heather Keats would produce Stuff's 6pm news bulletin and other news content.

=== Sky Network Television ownership ===
On 22 July 2025, it was announced at the New Zealand's Exchange that Warner Bros. Discovery New Zealand free-to-air television (Three, Bravo, eden, Rush and HGTV) and streaming operations (ThreeNow) would be acquired by Sky for NZ$1. The sale was completed on 1 August 2025 with Warner Bros. Discovery (now Skydance Corporation) continuing to provide channels a continued supply of company's content under a multi-year commercial agreement.

The network announced at Sky's 2026 upfront that it would air the 2026 Commonwealth Games and added the Australian version of Millionaire Hot Seat to the competitive 7pm slot, as well as new dramas, returning local reality shows and the return of Married at First Sight Australia.

== Content ==
=== Output contracts ===
Mediaworks acquired a first-run and re-run contract with HD sourced material for 20th Century Fox Television content (which includes films under the brands 20th Century Fox, DreamWorks Animation – 2008 to present, Fox Atomic, Fox Searchlight Pictures, Icon Films – 2007 to 2012, now belongs to Prime Television New Zealand and Regency Enterprises), which was previously held by TVNZ. When TVNZ outbid them for their previous Disney Media Distribution contract. In 2015, they had the rights to Metro-Goldwyn-Mayer for more recent films.

Exclusive contracts with CBS News, ITV News, and Seven News for international news coverage.

Mediaworks has long held first-option contracts with NBC Universal (which includes films under the brands Focus Features and Universal Pictures) with select HD material from February 2011. As well as until the start of the US 2012 season, a first-option contract with CBS Television Distribution (which included films under the brands Paramount Pictures and non-animated DreamWorks Pictures) with select HD material from the end of 2012, this deal came to an end for new content from the start of 2013. From mid-2013, TV3 secured a first option deal with Sony Pictures Television for new content for TV series and movies that will be scheduled for late 2013 and the 2014 season. This deal signals a move away from the more expensive exclusive Fox deal, which is still under re-negotiation following the broadcaster's change in ownership.

On 20 December 2013, MediaWorks re-signed a revised down scaled exclusive deal with Fox. As a result of their receivership, they lost their first-option rights over NBCUniversal shows, which resulted in TVNZ acquiring the rights to Brooklyn Nine-Nine in 2014. They also lost their rights to air 20th Television programmes, which resulted in Prime airing Sleepy Hollow, and TVNZ airing Empire.

== Broadcasting details ==
From launch in November 1989 until digital television transition was completed on 1 December 2013, TV3 broadcast terrestrially using the analogue PAL-B&G. In some areas, TV3's analogue broadcast was on a different transmitter from TV One and TV2's analogue broadcasts, and viewers needed an additional antenna to pick up the channel; these included Hamilton, Tauranga, Taupo, Gisborne, Kapiti, Masterton, and Nelson. Most transmitters were on the VHF band; even before launch, it was deicded that some small pockets of the country would only receive it on UHF. In July 1988, it was decided that the channel would broadcast in the Canterbury area on channel 6, which implied a relocation of TV One and TV2 relays to channel 10 to avoid interference. This could also mean some viewers had to realign their sets or install UHF antennas. For the Wellington area, viewers were advised to buy television sets that could receive all VHF and UHF channels. Following the launch of TV4 in 1997, TV3 was displaced from some transmitters and moved to new frequencies.

Three is a broadcasting member of the Freeview platform as well as broadcasting on Sky. TV3 began screening widescreen transmissions on both platforms on 11 April 2007, although TelstraClear InHomeTV which got most of its content from Sky, switched back to screening the cropped version of TV3 for a couple of months due to non-widescreen customer complaints. TelstraClear resumed broadcasting the widescreen version of TV3 on 24 July 2007. In April 2008 TV3 commenced 1080i high definition broadcasts on the Freeview terrestrial platform and on Sky's HD satellite platform.

Three also broadcasts a livestream of the Auckland feed on its ThreeNow website and app.

== ThreeNow ==
ThreeNow (previously called TV3 On Demand and 3Now) is a free ad-supported New Zealand streaming platform owned by Sky Free. It is available on Apple, Android, LG, Panasonic and Sony devices and smart TVs. The streaming service hosts content from Three and its sister channels Bravo, Sky Open, Rush, Eden and HGTV. It also hosts content from Warner Bros. Discovery's content library including the live-streaming channels WBTV Paranormal, WBTV Reality, WBTV House Hunters International, WBTV True Crime and WBTV 90 Day Fiancé. Notable New Zealand and international programmes including Law & Order: SVU, Blue Bloods, Come Dine with Me New Zealand, Below Deck Mediterranean, Dancing with the Stars, Gogglebox, Chicago Med, Australia's Best Houses, and Hawaii Five-O. The streaming service also hosts content from ThreeNow.

== ThreePlus1 ==
ThreePlus1 logo

ThreePlus1 (previously called TV3 Plus 1) is a 1-hour timeshift channel. It was launched on 30 March 2009, as part of Three's contract with Freeview to provide at least four channels. It is a standard hour delayed timeshift channel of the Three broadcast taken from their Auckland feed that was created originally for the Sky platform, meaning the channel broadcasts Auckland regional advertising. ThreePlus1 is available on digital terrestrial and digital satellite.

== Defunct ==
=== ThreeLife ===
ThreeLife
- Country: New Zealand
- Broadcast area: National

Programming
- Picture format: 1080i (HDTV)
- Timeshift service: ThreeLife + 1

Ownership
- Owner: MediaWorks New Zealand
- Sister channels: Three, Bravo, The Edge TV

History
- Launched: 15 April 2018
- Closed: 25 March 2020
- Replaced by: The Edge TV

Links
- Website: www.threenow.co.nz

ThreeLife was a New Zealand nationwide television channel that was launched on 15 April 2018. It aired lifestyle shows. The content aired on ThreeLife was themed, as follows:

- Monday: Taste Life
- Tuesday: Explore Life
- Wednesday: Fast Life
- Thursday: DIY Life
- Friday: Love Life
- Saturday: Lifestyle
- Sunday: Wild Life

Good Chef Bad Chef, Everyday Gourmet with Justine Schofield and The Home Team were aired from 6 pm to 7:30 pm every night. During the day, the channel repeated programmes from the previous night. These aired from 9 am on Monday through Friday, from 11:30 am on Saturday, and from 6 am on Sunday. From midnight to 6 am, a simulcast of Magic Talk was broadcast.

ThreeLife was shut down at the end of 25 March 2020, and was replaced by the return of The Edge TV a little over an hour later. The final show to air on ThreeLife was Good Chef Bad Chef.

=== ThreeLife + 1 ===
ThreeLife + 1 was a 1-hour timeshift channel. It was launched on 1 July 2019, in the place of The Edge TV. The station was shut down at 1 am on 26 March 2020, and was replaced on 16 April by The Breeze TV.
