= Breeze TV =

- Country: New Zealand
- Broadcast area: New Zealand

Programming
- Picture format: 1080p 16:9 (HDTV)

Ownership
- Owner: MediaWorks New Zealand
- Sister channels: The Edge TV

History
- Launched: 16 April 2020
- Replaced: ThreeLife + 1
- Closed: December 2022

Breeze TV was a New Zealand music streaming channel that was launched by The Breeze radio station on 16 April 2020 as a replacement for MediaWorks New Zealand's former ThreeLife + 1 on channel 14. Breeze TV was launched alongside sister channel The Edge TV, which replaced ThreeLife on channel 11. On 1 December 2020, Discovery, Inc. acquired Breeze TV as part of its acquisition of MediaWorks' television operations. On 21 March 2022, Breeze TV became an exclusively online streaming channel, alongside sister channel The Edge TV. In December 2022, Breeze TV and The Edge TV both ceased broadcasting.
