= List of Jono and Ben episodes =

This is a list of episodes of Jono and Ben (called Jono and Ben at Ten until it moved to the 7:30 pm time slot), the New Zealand comedy show.

The show is presented by Jono Pryor and Ben Boyce, with the third presenter's chair filled by Guy Williams. In 2013, series two saw Williams being credited underneath the hosts instead of as a guest. In November 2013, the hosts announced that comedian Rose Matafeo would also be joining the team as a co-host.

== Series overview ==
Series	Episodes	Originally released	
Series	Episodes	First released	Last released
1	20	13 July 2012	30 November 2012
2	21	31 May 2013	20 December 2013
3	31	21 February 2014	12 December 2014
4	27	27 March 2015	4 December 2015
5	32	12 February 2016	11 November 2016
6	27	23 February 2017	12 October 2017
7	25	31 May 2018	15 November 2018

== Episodes ==
=== Series 1 (2012) ===
No. overall	No. in series	Title	Guest(s)	Original release date
1	1	"Pilot"	Guy Williams, Jeremy Corbett, Shannon Ryan, Frankie O'Halloran, Chopper Read, Steve Wrigley, Nathan Bevan, Tammy Davis, Britta Brandt, Jaime Ridge, Sonny Bill Williams and Mark Richardson	13 July 2012
Jono and Ben break into song, parodying the State Insurance commercial and explaining that their former shows have merged. Guy interviews Sonny Bill Williams during his retirement press release, creating the Sonny Guy Williams feud. The first Jono vs. Ben creates new adverts for their show. The first Action Men has the boys play 400m I Can't Touch The Ground; The Changing Room turns Mr. Vintage into an elderly couple's bedroom; The Manchilds interview The Block NZ host and co-host, Mark Richardson and Shannon Ryan while in the Guy Williams Television Segment, the boys make Guy to perform stand-up in public places.
2	2	"Bieber Fever"	Guy Williams, Justin Bieber, Britta Brandt, Frankie O'Halloran, Johnny Barker, Darcy-Ray Flavell-Hudson, Nathan Bevan, Natalie Medlock, Ben Crawford and Libby Crawford	20 July 2012
Guy is sent to cover Justin Bieber's arrival in New Zealand inadvertently creating a news fluff piece; Jono and Ben give unsuspecting men the Bieber treatment; In Jono vs. Ben, the boys adapt a book into a film; In Action Men, the boys go Ghost Chipping; The Changing Room sees Mr. Vintage transformed into a funeral; The Manchilds interview Sally and Jaime Ridge; in the Guy Williams Television Segment the boys send Guy to interview Justin Bieber but Guy doesn't show up and Jono punishes Ben in Sux to Be.
3	3	"Smoking"	Guy Williams, Sir Peter Leitch, Dayna Vawdrey, Frankie O'Halloran, Britta Brandt, Bryce Casey, Nathan Bevan, Natalie Medlock, Tame Noema, Sienna Boyce, Indie Boyce, Oscar Pryor and Peter Mochrie	27 July 2012
In Jono vs. Ben, the boys recreate reality shows; Action Men has the boys play Ribbon Racing; The Manchilds interview Tame Noema from The GC; Guy is still hoping the Crawford siblings will kiss in The Block NZ; The Changing Room transforms Mr. Vintage into a sweat shop; Jono announces he has stopped smoking which leads to Guy blocking out smokers in Guy Williams Television Segment and Jono punishes Ben by making him wear fetish gear while reading excerpts from 50 Shades of Grey in Sux To Be.
4	4	"Olympic"	3 August 2012	
5	5	"Olympic Fever"	Guy Williams, Toni Potter, Sonia Gray, Nathan Bevan, Jimmy James Fletcher, Steven Gray, Frankie O'Halloran, Ella Sagison, Tessa Clement, Jay-Jay Feeney, Vahe Grigorian, Anna Hutchison	10 August 2012
The boys do a sports parody Scribe's song "Not Many"; In Jono vs. Ben the boys make new medical dramas; in Action Men the boys do Phanding; The Manchilds interview actress, Anna Hutchison; The Changing Room transforms Mr. Vintage into a Girls Locker Room; Guy Williams Television Segment attends the Chiefs Victory Parade in Hamilton; Jono punishes Ben by making him strip in Sux to Be.
6	6	"Welcome Home"	Guy Williams, Anna Julienne, Nathan Bevan, Steve Wrigley, Frankie O'Halloran, Andrew Mulligan, David Farrier, Jay McGuiness, Nathan Sykes, Nathan Cohen, Aaron Gate, Mahé Drysdale, Sarah Walker, Simon Van Velthooven, Daniel Bell, Marc Ryan, Joseph Sullivan, Storm Uru, Eric Murray and John Campbell	17 August 2012
Jono sings the Olympics; In Jono vs. Ben, the boys create their own children's shows; in Action Men, the boys do a "Shop Smart-Ass New Zealand" at a Countdown supermarket; The Manchilds interview two members of The Wanted; The Changing Room transforms Mr. Vintage into a Police line-up; The Guy Williams Television Segment, Guy welcomes the New Zealand Olympians back and in Sux to Be, Ben punishes Jono by making him do a live version of the board game Operation.
7	7	"Red Nose Day Special"	Guy Williams, Frankie O'Halloran, Nathan Bevan, Jason Gunn, Tammy Davis, Ashley Hawkes, Hayley Holt, Michael Murphy, Andrew Mulligan, Stephen McIvor, Lana Garland, Bruce Hopkins, Jay-Jay Feeney, Mike Puru, Dom Harvey, Ben Franks, Kieran Read, Glen Osborne	24 August 2012
Jeremy Corbett replaces Guy Williams as third chair as he is at the Red Nose Day Charity Event; Jono, Ben and Guy try to raise money for Red Nose Day including making a charity song (Do You Know Who Any of Us Are?) to challenge the Flight of the Conchords's song, Feel Inside (And Stuff Like That); in Jono vs. Ben, the boys create their own sitcoms; the Man Childs interview, Target presenter, Brooke Howard Smith; The Changing Room changes a Mr Vintage store into an interview with The GC cast members, Serena Cooper; Guy revenge interviews Sonny Bill Williams and loses, Ben and Jono's Australian counterparts, Hamish Blake and Andy Lee send a charity message from England and Jono gets his revenge against Ben in Sux To Be.
8	8	"Father's Day"	Guy Williams, Colin Mathura Jeffree, Dayna Vawdrey, James McOnie, Nathan Bevan, Frankie O'Halloran, Carena West, Mack Gray Sr, Mitchell Tipene, Fa'onelua Ofa Haare, Joey Te Hira, Marcus Kingi, Siale Tunoka, Ben Crawford, Libby Crawford and Urzila Carlson	31 August 2012
In Jono vs. Ben, the boys make their own versions of fragrance commercials; Guy goes to The Block Open Homes with a Kiss-Cam in pursuit of the allusive kiss between the winners; The Man Childs interview New Zealand Olympic Gold medallists, Eric Murray and Hamish Bond; Daydreaming in the middle of a conversation with a stranger is the theme in Action Men; a Mr Vintage store is turned into a pub scene from Once Were Warriors in The Changing Room; and Ben gets to punish Jono after winning last week's Jono vs. Ben in Sux To Be.
9	9	"Fashion Week"	Guy Williams, Frankie O'Halloran, Nathan Bevan, Levi Hawken, Steve Wrigley, Duncan Heyde, Twitter Bird, Hunter Edwards, Jaime Ridge, and Sally Ridge	7 September 2012
Guy Williams flies to Japan to confront his rival, Sonny Bill Williams while Tammy Davis sits in as the third chair; Jono and Ben practice Phanding (the Art of handing an object to a stranger while they are on the phone); in Jono vs. Ben, the boys create fashion television shows; The Man Childs interview The Block NZ winners, Libby and Ben Crawford; Mr Vintage changes into a prison room in the final of The Changing Room; and Jono gets to punish Ben in Sux To Be.
10	10	"New Zealand Pilot Week"	Guy Williams, Suzy Cato, Kimberley Crossman, Rosanna Arkle, Frankie O'Halloran, Nathan Bevan, Tame Noema, Jordan Watson, Frank Bunce, Libby Crawford and Ben Crawford	14 September 2012
The boys audition for New Zealand's Got Talent incognito as The Butter Boys; in Jono vs. Ben, the boys 'kiwify' television shows; The Bloke Test is the theme in Action Men; Guy Williams Television Segment makes its debut; The Man Childs interview Two Little Boys stars Hamish Blake and Bret McKenzie; The Changing Room: Extreme pranks The Block NZ host, Mark Richardson and Jono and Ben punish Guy in Sux To Be.
11	11	"Superheroes"	Guy Williams, Frankie O'Halloran, Nathan Bevan, Sir Peter Leitch, Levi Vaoga, Suzanne Paul, Tom Walsh, Shotgun.co.nz, Steve Wrigley, Urzila Carlson, Tammy Davis, Michelle Pickles, Petra Bagust and Craig Stanaway	21 September 2012
Guy interviews Valerie Adams upon her return from the 2012 Summer Olympics, in Action Men they have an "Awkward-athlon"; in Jono vs. Ben, the boys make their own superhero movies; The Man Childs interview New Zealand's Got Talent judge, Jason Kerrison; and Jono gets punished by Ben for losing last week.
12	12	"New Zealand's Got Talent?"	Guy Williams, Frankie O'Halloran, Nathan Bevan, Robbie Magasiva, David Mulligan, Manel Exposito, Darcey-Ray Flavell-Hudson, Rob MacKinnon, Preston Bardell, Shannon Ryan	28 September 2012
In Jono vs. Ben, the boys reboot 80's television shows; Day Dreaming returns in Action Men; the Man Childs interview singer/dancer, Timomatic; Guy Williams tries to get into the New Zealand iPhone 5 launch and Ben punishes Jono in Sux To Be.
13	13	"Redundant"	Guy Williams, Frankie O'Halloran, Nathan Bevan, Ben Crawford, Richard Till, Michael Laws, Nigel Corbett, Anthony Ray Parker, Preston Bardell, Indie Boyce	5 October 2012
Jono and Ben reminiscence about being made redundant from their previous shows being cancelled; Action Men do Stores in Their Eyes; in Jono vs. Ben, the boys try to make their own drama; the Man Childs interview Jeremy Corbett and Ben punishes Jono in Sux To Be.
14	14	"7 Days"	Guy Williams, Frankie O'Halloran, Nathan Bevan, Ben Crawford, Jade Louise, Michael Murphy, Dai Henwood, Jeremy Corbett, Michele Hine	12 October 2012
In Jono vs. Ben, the boys make commercials featuring presenters from 7 Days; Guy Williams tries to interview Usain Bolt; Jono and Ben do a 200-metre Can't Touch The Ground in Action Men; the boys are inspired to create a music video call "I Want To Be a Reality Star"; The Man Childs interview Anika Moa, Boh Runga and Hollie Smith and while Ben punishes Jono for losing in Sux To Be, it backfires.
15	15	"Muppets"	Guy Williams, Kimberley Crossman, Les the Horse, Frankie O'Halloran, Rawiri Paratene, Nitro Circus, Nathan Bevan, Bushwacker Luke, Sesame Street Cast, Adam Thompson, John Key, Butch Williams, Dusty Wygle	19 October 2012
Jono and Ben try to place stickers on people in public; In Guy Williams Television Segment, Guy tries to get the National Bank horse its job back as a company logo in Mt Eden; In Jono vs. Ben the challenge was to recreate a show featuring Muppets; In Action Men, Jono and Ben are challenged to recreate the John Key Three Way Handshake; The Manchilds interview Luke Williams from the Bushwhackers; and in Sux to Be, Jono uses Ben as an Angry Bird slingshot.
16	16	"No Guy Williams"	Guy Williams, Chopper Read, Violet O'Halloran, Nathan Bevan, Amber Peebles, Kimberley Crossman, Frankie O'Halloran, Carena West, Stan Walker, Keisha Castle-Hughes, John Campbell, Kim Dotcom, Temuera Morrison, Shannon Ryan and Candy Lane	26 October 2012
Urzila Carlson sits in for Guy while he is getting McDonald's after his appearance on 7 Days. Guy tries to give away free Marmite during the Great New Zealand Marmite Crisis. Jono and Ben scare people by hiding in a box in public (aptly named "Dick in a Box"). In Jono vs. Ben the boys recreate their own infomercials. The Manchilds interview Temuera Morrison. In Action Men, Jono and Ben recreate The Hunger Games and Ben punishes Jono, Angry Birds style in Sux To Be.
17	17	"Gay Red Shirt"	Guy Williams, Ming-Jen Huang, Tammy Davis, Nathan Bevan, Natalie Medlock, John Leigh, Frankie O'Halloran, Siobhan Marshall, Anna Guy, Ali Campbell, Jon Bridges, Kimbra, Karl Urban, Wi$h Bone, Darcy-Ray Flavell-Hudson, Lui Gumaka, Harry Huavi, Chris Mac, Eli Paewai, Ji Fraser, Marlon Gerbes, Matiu Walters, Tame Noema, Hollie Smith, Savage, Kimberley Crossman, Annah Mac, Starboy, Marcus Mumford, Winston Marshall, Ben Lovett, Ted Dwane, Shannon Ryan, Zowie and Jaime Ridge.	9 November 2012
Ben sings "Songs in the Key of Key"; Action Men see the boys do "New Zealand's Got Talent on the Street"; In Jono vs. Ben, the boys make current television shows more saucy; the boys switch signs in public; The Manchilds do their interviews at the 2012 Vodafone Music Awards; Guy covers the Auckland Marathon and in Sux To Be, Ben punishes Jono by making him Bungee jumping off the Auckland Harbour Bridge dressed as Mary Poppins.
18	18	"New Lows"	Guy Williams, Kimberley Crossman, Greg Goodyer, Nathan Bevan, Chris Rene, Natalie Medlock, Frankie O'Halloran, Steve Wrigley, Richard Till, Len Brown, Prince Charles, Colin Mathura-Jeffree, Michelle Pickles, John Campbell, Amanda Boyce and Indie Boyce.	16 November 2012
Guy covers the Queen Street parade for Prince Charles's visit in Auckland, Jono & Ben enter the Fashion in the Field Best Dressed Competition during Cup Day in Christchurch; in Jono vs. Ben make TV dramas; In Action Men, the boys Share A Coke with a twist; The Manchilds interview Chris Rene and Jono punishes Ben by scaring him in Sux to Be.
19	19	"Middle Earth"	Guy Williams, Kimberley Crossman, Jaime Ridge, Nathan Bevan, Delta Goodrem, Sally Ridge, Frankie O'Halloran, Winston Peters, Reece Mastin, Mike Puru, Dominic Harvey, Hamish McKay, DJ Sir-Vere and Valerie Adams	23 October 2012
In Action Men, Stores in their Eyes returns with Reece Mastin judging; in Jono vs. Ben, the boys recreate Box Office Movies; Guy was made to read his harshest tweets in public; The Manchilds interview Delta Goodrem and in Sux to Be, Ben punishes Jono by making him wing walk on a plane.
20	20	"1 Hour series Finale"	Guy Williams, Jamie Christmas, Dai Henwood, Nathan Bevan, Tammy Davis, Paul Ego, Frankie O'Halloran, Jeremy Corbett, John McDonald, Dobbo, Hayley Holt, Rosanna Arkle, Sarah Walker, Ming Jen Huang, Jordan Luck Band, Tāmati Coffey, John Campbell, Elijah Wood, James Cameron, Hugo Weaving, Peter Jackson, DJ Sir-Vere, Nathan Cohen, Aaron Gate, Mahé Drysdale, Petra Bagust, Ben Crawford, Libby Crawford, Valerie Adams, Jonah Lomu, Mark Sainsbury, John Key, Anna Hutchison, Bret McKenzie, Hamish Blake, Jay McGuiness, Nathan Sykes, Brooke Howard-Smith, Delta Goodrem, Hamish Bond, Eric Murray, Sally Ridge, Jaime Ridge, Ali Williams, Chris Rene, Temuera Morrison, Jimmy James Fletcher, Tessa Clement and Tame Noema.	30 October 2012
In this double length episode (which aired half an hour earlier), Jono and Ben get advice from the 7 Days cast before the show; Guy is sent to Wellington to cover the first Hobbit movie premiere; Jono vs. Ben hold the JABbies announcing the best sketches; The Manchilds run through their best interview questions while Little Guy makes his debut; In Sux to Be, Jono punishes Ben by taking some of the best punishments and turns them into a mega prank. The boys have their boss, John McDonald have a disciplinary meeting with Guy; Action Men go through their top ten events; Jono and Ben hold a popularity contest with Ben winning Part 1 and Jono winning Parts 2 and 3; the boys show what shows are coming up on TV3 including The JC, True Bro'd, The Dentalist, The BMX Factor, Toastwatch, Bored Security and Private Cactus; Ben shrinkwraps Jono's Holden Kingswood while Jono is performing his prank on Ben and as neither Jono nor Ben won the ultimate Jono vs. Ben, Guy Williams will have to take the punishment.

=== Series 2 (2013) ===
Although TV3 and its parent company MediaWorks were in receivership at the time, Jono and Ben at Ten returned for a second series. Guy Williams is now billed directly under the main presenters, Jono Pryor and Ben Boyce. Frankie O'Halloran and Nathan Bevan return as Man Childs, Little Ben and Little Johnny, with Jamie Christmas appearing more as Little Guy. Both The Changing Room and Old News segments were retired with The NeXt Actor (a comedic celebrity version of The X-Factor) making its debut. The second series began airing 31 May 2013.

No. overall	No. in series	Title	Guest(s)	Original release date
21	1	"We're Back"	Nathan Bevan, Tammy Davis, Shannon Ryan, Frankie O'Halloran, Steve Wrigley, Robbie Magasiva, Jamie Christmas, Jeremy Corbett, Jason Gunn, Jaquie Brown, Andrew Mulligan, Rosanna Arkle, Melanie Blatt, Greg Goodyer, Tame Noema, Kim Dotcom, Gareth Morgan and Colin Craig.	31 May 2013
series two starts with a "The Funder Games" sketch having television hosts "fight to the death" for funding; In Jono vs. Ben, the boys choose an event of 2013 and turn it into a movie; the first NeXt Actor has Jaquie Brown work in the Pita Pit; Guy helps a customer become sunsmart in regards to their milk carton; In Action Men, Jono and Ben are in the Gold Coast where they do "Beach Sports"; The Manchilds interview Jono and Ben; In Sux To Be, both Jono and Ben are punished by having to walk through the Gold Coast in Speedos.
22	2	"Episode 2"	TBA	7 June 2013
23	3	"Episode 3"	TBA	14 June 2013
24	4	"Episode 4"	TBA	21 June 2013
25	5	"Episode 5"	TBA	28 June 2013
26	6	"Episode 6"	TBA	5 July 2013
27	7	"Episode 7"	TBA	12 July 2013
28	8	"Episode 8"	TBA	19 July 2013
29	9	"Episode 9"	TBA	27 September 2013
30	10	"Episode 10"	TBA	4 October 2013
31	11	"Episode 11"	TBA	11 October 2013
32	12	"Episode 12"	TBA	18 October 2013
33	13	"Episode 13"	TBA	25 October 2013
34	14	"Episode 14"	TBA	1 November 2013
35	15	"Episode 15"	TBA	8 November 2013
36	16	"Episode 16"	TBA	15 November 2013
37	17	"Episode 17"	TBA	22 November 2013
38	18	"Episode 18"	TBA	29 November 2013
39	19	"Episode 19"	TBA	6 December 2013
40	20	"Episode 20"	TBA	13 December 2013
41	21	"Xmas Party"	TBA	20 December 2013

=== Red Nose Day Comedy Cure For Kids (2013) ===
While not entirely a part of the Jono & Ben at Ten show, the special was to raise money for the Cure For Kids cause. Jono, Ben and Guy, "biked" the length of New Zealand (Invercargill to Cape Reinga) while performing their shows skits and challenges in different cities. The special was an amalgamation between the Friday night primetime shows on TV3, including 7 Days, Jono and Ben at Ten, Super City and The X-Factor. At the time of airing, both 7 Days and Jono and Ben at Ten were on their mid-series hiatus. In Bluff, Dunedin, Christchurch, Picton, Wellington, Palmerston North, Taupo, Hamilton and Whangarei.

No. overall	No. in series	Title	Original release date
1	1	"Special"	23 August 2013
Hosted by Jeremy Corbett, Paul Ego, Ben Hurley and Steve Wrigley. Special appearances by Jackie Thomas, Benny Tipene, Brock Ashby, Piri Weepu, Jason Aileone, Marley Wilcox-Nanai, Rory McKenna, Tom Batchelor, Ewen Gilmour, Hannah-Jane Thorne, Nica Israel, Nicole Hedder, Taiva Ioane, Fletcher Mills, Cory Jane, Dai Henwood, Urzila Carlson, Jeremy Elwood, Madeleine Sami, Shannon Ryan, Rose Matafeo, Brendan Pongia, Mahé Drysdale, Jeremy Wells, Bret McKenzie, Jemaine Clement, Peter Urlich, Boh Runga, Murray Hewitt, Samuel Scott, Savage, Elizabeth Marvelly, Ruby Frost, Mel, Claire Chitham, Craig Parker, Rena Owen, Zoë Bell, Melanie Lynskey, Lucy Lawless, Dominic Bowden, Sarah Walker, Jon Bridges, Mark Richardson, Colin Mathura-Jeffree, Mike McRoberts, Chris Martin, Josh Kronfeld, Hayley Holt, Beauden Barrett, Dane Coles, Francis Saili, Colin Slade, Aaron Smith, Cassie Henderson, Tariana Turia, Trevor Mallard, Phil Goff, John Banks, David Shearer, Grant Robertson, Paula Bennett, Hone Harawira, Guy Sebastian, Stan Walker, Michael Winslow, Arj Barker, Petra Bagust, Nathan Rarere, Chopper Read, Jesse Griffin, Josh Thompson, Kimbra, Ladyhawke, Anna Hutchison, Fleur Saville and some of the kids who appeared in Feel Inside (And Stuff Like That).

=== Series 3 (2014) ===
No. overall	No. in series	Title	Guest(s)	Original release date
42	1	"Episode 1"	TBA	21 February 2014
43	2	"Episode 2"	TBA	28 February 2014
44	3	"Episode 3"	TBA	7 March 2014
45	4	"Episode 4"	TBA	14 March 2014
46	5	"Episode 5"	TBA	21 March 2014
47	6	"Episode 6"	TBA	28 March 2014
48	7	"Episode 7"	TBA	4 April 2014
49	8	"Episode 8"	TBA	11 April 2014
50	9	"Episode 9"	TBA	18 April 2014
51	10	"Episode 10"	TBA	13 June 2014
52	11	"Episode 11"	TBA	20 June 2014
53	12	"Episode 12"	TBA	27 June 2014
54	13	"Episode 13"	TBA	4 July 2014
55	14	"Episode 14"	TBA	11 July 2014
56	15	"Episode 15"	TBA	18 July 2014
57	16	"Episode 16"	TBA	25 July 2014
58	17	"Episode 17"	TBA	1 August 2014
59	18	"Episode 18"	TBA	8 August 2014
60	19	"Episode 19"	TBA	15 August 2014
61	20	"Live Election Results Show"	TBA	19 September 2014
62	21	"Episode 21"	TBA	3 October 2014
63	22	"Episode 22"	TBA	10 October 2014
64	23	"Episode 23"	TBA	17 October 2014
65	24	"Episode 24"	TBA	25 October 2014
66	25	"Episode 25"	TBA	31 October 2014
67	26	"Episode 26"	TBA	7 November 2014
68	27	"Episode 27"	TBA	14 November 2014
69	28	"Jono and Ben Celebrate TV3's Half Half Century"	TBA	21 November 2014
70	29	"Best of Jono and Ben Part 1"	TBA	28 November 2014
71	30	"Best of Jono and Ben Part 2"	TBA	5 December 2014
72	31	"Best of Jono and Ben Part 3"	TBA	12 December 2014

=== Series 4 (2015) ===
No. overall	No. in series	Title	Guest(s)	Original release date
73	1	"Episode 1"	TBA	27 March 2015
74	2	"Episode 2"	TBA	3 April 2015
75	3	"Episode 3"	TBA	10 April 2015
76	4	"Episode 4"	TBA	17 April 2015
77	5	"Episode 5"	TBA	24 April 2015
78	6	"Episode 6"	TBA	1 May 2015
79	7	"Episode 7"	TBA	8 May 2015
80	8	"Episode 8"	TBA	15 May 2015
81	9	"Episode 9"	TBA	22 May 2015
82	10	"Episode 10"	TBA	26 June 2015
83	11	"Episode 11"	TBA	3 July 2015
84	12	"Episode 12"	TBA	10 July 2015
85	13	"Episode 13"	TBA	17 July 2015
86	14	"Episode 14"	TBA	24 July 2015
87	15	"Episode 15"	TBA	31 July 2015
88	16	"Episode 16"	TBA	7 August 2015
89	17	"Episode 17"	TBA	14 August 2015
90	18	"Episode 18"	TBA	21 August 2015
91	19	"Episode 19"	TBA	29 August 2015
92	20	"Episode 20"	TBA	16 October 2015
93	21	"Episode 21"	TBA	23 October 2015
94	22	"Episode 22"	TBA	30 October 2015
95	23	"Episode 23"	TBA	6 November 2015
96	24	"Episode 24"	TBA	13 November 2015
97	25	"Episode 25"	TBA	20 November 2015
98	26	"Episode 26"	TBA	27 November 2015
99	27	"Episode 27"	TBA	4 December 2015

=== Series 5 (2016) ===
No. overall	No. in series	Title	Guest(s)	Original release date
100	1	"Episode 1"	TBA	12 February 2016
101	2	"Episode 2"	TBA	19 February 2016
102	3	"Episode 3"	TBA	26 February 2016
103	4	"Episode 4"	TBA	4 March 2016
104	5	"Episode 5"	TBA	11 March 2016
105	6	"Episode 6"	TBA	18 March 2016
106	7	"Episode 7"	TBA	1 April 2016
107	8	"Episode 8"	TBA	8 April 2016
108	9	"Episode 9"	TBA	15 April 2016
109	10	"Episode 10"	TBA	22 April 2016
110	11	"Episode 11"	TBA	29 April 2016
111	12	"Episode 12"	TBA	6 May 2016
112	13	"Episode 13"	TBA	13 May 2016
113	14	"Episode 14"	TBA	20 May 2016
114	15	"Episode 15"	TBA	27 May 2016
115	16	"Episode 16"	TBA	3 June 2016
116	17	"Episode 17"	TBA	29 July 2016
117	18	"Episode 18"	TBA	5 August 2016
118	19	"Episode 19"	TBA	12 August 2016
119	20	"Episode 20"	TBA	19 August 2016
120	21	"Episode 21"	TBA	26 August 2016
121	22	"Episode 22"	TBA	2 September 2016
122	23	"Episode 23"	TBA	9 September 2016
123	24	"Episode 24"	TBA	16 September 2016
124	25	"Episode 25"	TBA	23 September 2016
125	26	"Episode 26"	TBA	30 September 2016
126	27	"Episode 27"	TBA	7 October 2016
127	28	"Episode 28"	TBA	14 October 2016
128	29	"Episode 29"	TBA	21 October 2016
129	30	"Episode 30"	TBA	28 October 2016
130	31	"Episode 31"	TBA	4 November 2016
131	32	"Best of Jono and Ben 2016"	TBA	11 November 2016

=== Series 6 (2017) ===
No. overall	No. in series	Title	Guest(s)	Original release date
132	1	"Episode 1"	TBA	23 February 2017
133	2	"Episode 2"	TBA	2 March 2017
134	3	"Episode 3"	TBA	9 March 2017
135	4	"Episode 4"	TBA	16 March 2017
136	5	"Episode 5"	TBA	23 March 2017
137	6	"Episode 6"	TBA	30 March 2017
138	7	"Episode 7"	TBA	6 April 2017
139	8	"Episode 8"	TBA	13 April 2017
140	9	"Episode 9"	TBA	20 April 2017
141	10	"Episode 10"	TBA	27 April 2017
142	11	"Episode 11"	TBA	4 May 2017
143	12	"Episode 12"	TBA	11 May 2017
144	13	"Episode 13"	TBA	18 May 2017
145	14	"Episode 14"	TBA	25 May 2017
146	15	"Episode 15"	TBA	1 June 2017
147	16	"Episode 16"	TBA	8 June 2017
148	17	"Cool Town Bro"	TBA	15 June 2017
149	18	"Episode 18"	TBA	10 August 2017
150	19	"Episode 19"	TBA	17 August 2017
151	20	"Episode 20"	TBA	24 August 2017
152	21	"Episode 21"	TBA	31 August 2017
153	22	"Episode 22"	TBA	7 September 2017
154	23	"Episode 23"	TBA	14 September 2017
155	24	"Election Special"	TBA	21 September 2017
156	25	"Episode 25"	TBA	29 September 2017
157	26	"Episode 26"	TBA	5 October 2017
158	27	"Episode 27"	TBA	12 October 2017

=== Series 7 (2018) ===
No. overall	No. in series	Title	Guest(s)	Original release date
159	1	"Episode 1"	TBA	31 May 2018
160	2	"Episode 2"	TBA	7 June 2018
161	3	"Episode 3"	TBA	14 June 2018
162	4	"Episode 4"	TBA	21 June 2018
163	5	"Episode 5"	TBA	28 June 2018
164	6	"Episode 6"	TBA	5 July 2018
165	7	"Episode 7"	TBA	12 July 2018
166	8	"Episode 8"	TBA	19 July 2018
167	9	"Episode 9"	TBA	26 July 2018
168	10	"Episode 10"	TBA	2 August 2018
169	11	"Episode 11"	TBA	9 August 2018
170	12	"Episode 12"	TBA	16 August 2018
171	13	"Episode 13"	TBA	23 August 2018
172	14	"Episode 14"	TBA	30 August 2018
173	15	"Episode 15"	TBA	6 September 2018
174	16	"Episode 16"	TBA	13 September 2018
175	17	"Episode 17"	TBA	20 September 2018
176	18	"Episode 18"	TBA	27 September 2018
177	19	"Episode 19"	TBA	4 October 2018
178	20	"Episode 20"	TBA	11 October 2018
179	21	"Episode 21"	TBA	18 October 2018
180	22	"Episode 22"	TBA	25 October 2018
181	23	"Episode 23"	TBA	1 November 2018
182	24	"Episode 24"	TBA	8 November 2018
183	25	"Episode 25"	TBA	15 November 2018

== Jono vs. Ben/Sux To Be ==
Each week, Jono and Ben challenge each other to creating the most popular video where the audience votes by liking either or both videos on Facebook. The losing video's creator ends up being punished by the winning video's creator in the next episode of Jono & Ben at Ten's segment Sux To Be. Where there is a draw, Guy Williams is the recipient of the punishment instead of either Jono or Ben.

– indicates the presenter with the winning video.
– indicates the presenter with the losing video and the one who gets punished in the following episode.
– indicates a draw so Guy Williams gets the punishment in the following episode.

Episode	Jono Sketch	Ben Sketch
series 1
1	Mitre 10 Dream Ad	Push To Add Comedy
2	Where's Wally?	Hairy Maclary from Donaldson's Dairy
3	Baby MasterChef	The Butchelor
4	Man	Milton Bradley
5	Shorty Street	Sonia Gray's Anatomy/Steve Gray's Anatomy
6	Play With Myself	Jake The Bus
7	Shit Jokes My Dad Says	Churs
8	KFShe	Colin
9	Fashion Police Ten 7	New Zealand's Nek Top Minnit
10	Black Jersey Boys	G CSI
11	Captain Awkward	Advengers
12	Magasiva, P.I.	Ghost CHiPs
13	Laws & Order	NCIS: Nursery Crimes Investigation Squad
14	Dai Henwood DVD Box Set	Jeremy Corbett Infomercial
15	Little Ted	Sesame Land Street
16	New Zealand News Anchors Action Figures	The Tall Poppy Chopper
17	Home & Walk Away	Downtrou Abbey
18	Overbelly: The Kim Dotcom Story	Homebrand
19	Parliamentary Activity	Taken: A Ridge Too Far
20	The JABbies; Where's Wally? Man; Home & Walk Away	The JABbies; Churs; Shorty Street; The GCSI
series 2
1	Mission: Kim Possible	The Nike Hangover
2	Dora the Explorer Dora The Movie	Underbelly (TV series) The Wiggles Under Telly the tale of Four Skivves
3	Dirty Dancing Dirty Lancing	Now That's What I Call Music! Now That's What I Call Musicals
4	Inception Reception (Inception Parody)	Anchorman 2: The Legend Continues Anchorman : The Legend of John Hawkesby
5	The Terminator The School Terminator	Oz: the Great and Powerful Oz: The Great and Bludgerful
6	Rush Hour Rush Ow	Fast and Furious 6 Fast and Furious Learners Edition
7	The Block (Australian TV series) The Block Old	The X Factor (British TV series) Baby X Factor
8	The Shining The Blockening	Tetris Tetris The Movie
9	The Voice (TV series) The Boyce	Mad Men (TV series) Mad Ben
10	You, Me and Dupree You, Me and John Key	White House Down Bee Hive Down
11		
12	The Waking Dead The Taking Dead	Speed Dating
13	House, M.D. Dr. Seuss	Shortland Street Shortland Street Jnr
14	Breaking Bad Baking Bad	Ninja Turtles Sesame Street Postman Pat Where are they Now
15	Freaky Friday	
16	love actually Woman The Movie	A Good Day to Die Hard Man The Movie
17		
18		
Series 3
1		

- In episode 1x08, Jono's wife leaves Ben a spare key to perform the punishment.
- In episode 1x10, Jono and Ben state their videos were a draw therefore Guy Williams was punished by having to pose in a life drawing class.
- In episode 1x14, while Ben's video won and his punishment for Jono was packaging up his car, their crew felt sorry for Jono and stole the flour cannon. As such, Jono shot Ben with the flour cannon before he could complete the punishment.
- In episode 1x16 Jono was helped out by Nitro Circus
- In episode 1x17, Ben made out Jono (who has a fear of heights) was bungy jumping, only to later push him off. Also this episode saw the debut of the flour cannon.
- In episode 1x18, Ben's wife, Amanda, lets Jono into the house to do a final scare.
- In the series one finale, when Jono was about to perform the final punishment on Ben (who was scared, had ice cold Powerade dumped on him, shot by a flour cannon and punched in the head by a female boxer), Jono slips on the ice and does not complete the prank. Later, while Ben is pranking Jono's pride and joy, his car, by shrink wrapping it then dropping a barricade on to it which crushes it, Ben reveals he switched Jono's car with a decoy.
- As this was the series finale, the Sux To Be punishment was decided by the JABbies, where the top three sketches from both Jono and Ben were voted for on Facebook. However, the boys decide to punish Guy. His punishment was that he had to stick his hand (and head for the third box) into three blind boxes while singing with "I'll Say Goodbye (Even Though I'm Blue)" with the Jordan Luck reminiscent of Guy singing this song at Sonny Bill Williams's press release. The boxes contained cockroaches, a rabbit and live eels respectively.
