= April Ieremia =

New Zealand netball player and television host

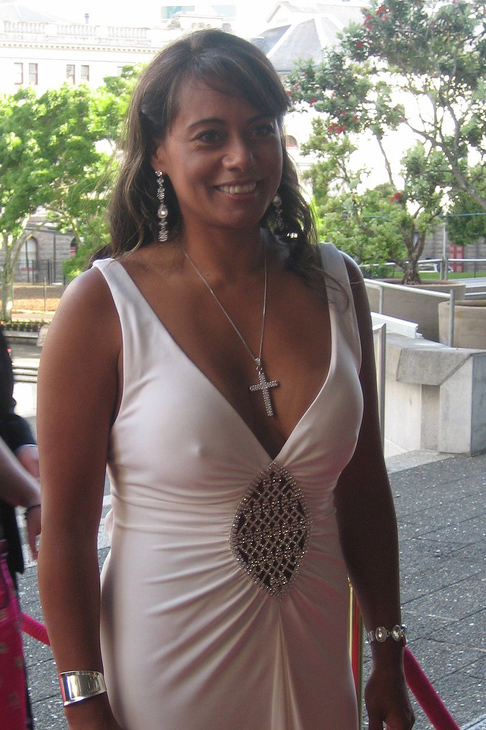
- Ieremia in 2006

Personal information
- Born: 31 October 1967 (age 59) Apia, Western Samoa
- Occupation: Television broadcaster
- Spouse: Andrew Bruce (2002-2006)
- Children: 2
- University: University of Canterbury

Netball career
- Playing positions: GA, GS, WA
Years	Club team	Apps
1983–92	Canterbury Netball	
Years	National team	Caps
1988–90, 1992	New Zealand	9
- Updated on 30 March 2010

April Ieremia (born 31 October 1967) is a New Zealand former netball player and television host.

== Netball career ==
April Ieremia was a New Zealand attacking player from Christchurch who represented Canterbury from 1983–1992. In 1985 she made the Young Internationals before being selected for New Zealand Under 21 in 1986 and then again in 1988 at the inaugural World Youth Cup. At 20, Ieremia represented the Silver Ferns (New Zealand's national netball team) from 1988–1990 and again in 1992.

== Sports Presenting career ==
In 1993, after retiring from international netball, Ieremia co-hosted the magazine sports show, Moro SportsExtra on TVNZ with Greg Clark, Stu Wilson, Jeff Crowe and Brent Todd. She became the main sports anchor for ONE NEWS from 1994 until 2003. In 1994, she presented for ONE Sport hosting at the 1994 Victoria Commonwealth Games, 1996 Olympic Games in Atlanta, 1998 Commonwealth Games in Kuala Lumpur, 2000 Sydney Olympics and 2002 Commonwealth Games in Manchester. Ieremia was the face of netball for ONE Sport hosting national and international netball competitions from 1995 including the 1999 and 2003 Netball World Championships, the regional National Bank Cup, Fisher and Paykel test Internationals and National Provincial Championships. In 2002, Ieremia hosted ASB Tennis Classic international in Auckland featuring Anna Kournikova and the men's Heinekin Open with Marat Safin and Goran Ivanisevic. From 1994–2003, Ieremia co-hosted the Halberg Sports Awards. In 1997, Ieremia won the coveted Qantas Award for Best Presenter. She finished sports presenting in December, 2003.

== General career ==
Ieremia hosted a number of major television specials like the 'Opening of Te Papa', 'The Big Jump' and the TV2 show, April's Angels, in 1997 and 1998. In 2001, Ieremia joined The Radio Network (TRN) as a breakfast show radio host with Mark Leishman on "Easy Listening i". Returning to television in 2007, she joined the Living Channel and Food TV on Sky TV.

April hosted a television talk show on SKY TV's The Living Channel called April in the Afternoon. The show started on 1 April 2008. She also developed her career behind the scenes in production and sponsorship in programmes for Food TV, the Living Channel and Eyeworks NZ. In 2012, Ieremia joined the new lifestyle channel Choice TV as a presenter and producer. Ieremia co-hosted a Choice TV daily chat show called Brunch with Josh Kronfeld in 2012. Ieremia also began working with HGTV (Home and Garden TV) in 2016.

== Personal life ==
Born in Apia, Western Samoa, April moved to Christchurch with her family in 1970. In Canterbury, she developed her deep love of sport and in particular, netball which has laid the foundation for most of her career as a player, broadcaster and coach. She graduated from the University of Canterbury with a BA in History and a Diploma of Teaching at the Christchurch College of Education in 1991. She taught at Avonside Girls School in Christchurch before moving to Auckland for a career in television.

In 2012, Ieremia published her first book, "April Loses It" on weight loss, which went on to feature on the best seller list for 4 weeks.

== See also ==
- List of New Zealand television personalities
