= Alex Breingan =

New Zealand television executive producer

- Breingan in 2018
- Born: Alexander James Breingan; May 4, 1972 (age 54); Lyme Regis, England, United Kingdom
- Other names: Alex James, AJ James, Alex B, Alexander J, Alexander James
- Citizenship: United Kingdom; New Zealand
- Education: Durham University
- Occupations: Former television producer/writer, former radio host
- Years active: 1990s–present

Alex Breingan (born May 4, 1972) (Note: Breingan claimed to be an American citizen as of April 2026. He also lived in New Zealand from 2002-2024 and possesses UK citizenship by birth. He also applied for American residency in late 2025.) is a television producer, television writer and former radio producer and host based in Los Angeles, USA, and previously in New Zealand. He is currently facing 33 fraud and forgery-related charges in New Zealand.

Starting his career in UK commercial radio and later as a producer at the BBC, Breingan moved to New Zealand in 2002, where he worked in radio management before transitioning into television. He co-founded Choice TV, now known as Eden in 2012, which was later acquired by international media companies, and established Stripe Studios, a production company responsible for various TV series in New Zealand.

In February 2026, the Serious Fraud Office announced that they had filed 33 charges of fraud in the Auckland District Court against Breingan. The charges allege that Breingan made false representations and used forged documents to obtain approximately NZ$14.5 million in funding, comprising more than NZ$4.3 million in government funded rebates and NZ$10.2 million in lending. Breingan has denied the charges against him and has said the matter was before the New Zealand courts.

In August 2026, Breingan appeared in the Auckland District Court by video link from the United States and pleaded not guilty to all charges. The court subsequently rejected his application to withdraw an outstanding arrest warrant and ordered him to return to New Zealand for further proceedings. The SFO has initiated extradition proceedings in the United States, and a jury trial is expected in mid-2028.

== Early life ==
Breingan was born and raised in Lyme Regis, England. He attended Woodroffe School and left in 1989. He then started working at RACAL Electronics in Seaton, England before going to Durham University in the mid 1990s. After leaving University he then went on to work as an intern for BBC Radio 1.

== Personal life ==
He is legally married to Rachel Hart, a former Three News reporter and food blogger. The couple were both a subject for the 2019 series 100 Day Renovation. Breingan and Hart have since separated.

Breingan has lived in Los Angeles with his partner, since 2024. In late 2025, Breingan applied for permanent residency in the United States.

== Career ==
After Breingan graduated from Durham University in the 1990s, he went to work as an intern on Radio 1. He then moved to Orchard FM in Taunton, before being a producer on Radio 2. He then moved to New Zealand in 2002. He spent 10 years in NZ radio including as Mediawork's Radio Operations Manager and Assistant Programme Director for both More FM and RadioLIVE.

After working in Radio, Breingan then moved into TV as Channel Manager for SKY TV's Food TV and The Living Channel. In 2012 Breingan co-founded free to air TV channel Choice TV which launched on Freeview and Sky that year. Canadian Media company Blue Ant Media acquired the channel in 2014. Discovery Inc. later acquired Choice TV in 2019.

In TV production, Breingan established production company Stripe Media in 2014, also known as Stripe Studios. The production company produced various television shows across New Zealand including the TV3 morning series, The Cafe which aired from 2016 until 2020.

Stripe Studios production includes series previously on SKY Open New Zealand, Discovery Australia New Zealand, TVNZ and NBCU NZ for the channel Bravo. Breingan created, co-wrote and produced The Circus, Rich Listers, and Discovery's Great Southern Truckers.

From 2019 to 2026, Breingan was a semi finals judge for the International Emmy Awards and later a finals judge in 2022.

=== Legal issues ===
==== Company collapse and move to the United States ====
In February 2024 reports emerged that Stripe Studios had failed to pay post-production companies for their work. In March 2024, one of the company's production entities, Stripe Studios (Comedy) Ltd, was placed into court-ordered liquidation, and Stripe Media entered both receivership and voluntary receivership. A receiver's report initially identified over NZD $20 million in outstanding debts and financial irregularities were subsequently referred to the Serious Fraud Office. Additional companies associated with Stripe Studios were placed into liquidation in July 2024.

Breingan stated that allegations reported were false and defamatory, writing that the NZ Herald was provided with false information. This was later followed up by a statement in September 2025 from a law firm in the US, purportedly representing Breingan. They later told media that they were no longer representing Breingan.

During the liquidation process Breingan registered two production companies in the UK. The production registration and website subsequently closed down.

Breingan then later established 2nd Hour Films with under the alias Alex James. Several projects disappeared from the website for 2nd Hour Films once reported in the media.

TV show Hoff Roading, which was heavily delayed in post production due to the financial issues, finally aired in New Zealand in September 2025 after being rescued by another production house. Another show, This Tastes Funny with Iliza Shlesinger was also rescued and released in 2026. It was understood that David Hasslehoff and Iliza Shlesinger both were owed money for the work on the productions.

In February 2026, the New Zealand Herald reported that a Los Angeles production company had severed ties with Breingan after he listed himself under the name “Alex James” as a producer on two of its projects on IMDb and on his company website, 2nd Hour Films. The company stated that he had no formal role and that the credits were not authorised.

==== Serious Fraud Investigation ====
In February 2026, the Serious Fraud Office announced that it had filed 33 charges of fraud in the Auckland District Court against Breingan. The charges allege that Breingan made false representations and used forged documents to obtain approximately NZ$14.5 million in funding, comprising more than NZ$4.3 million in government funded rebates and NZ$10.2 million in lending.

The alleged offending relates to the financing of 13 television programmes that were produced, or proposed to be produced, through companies associated with Breingan, including Stripe Studios. The investigation followed a referral from the New Zealand Film Commission, which raised concerns about applications made for the New Zealand Screen Production Rebate by entities linked to Stripe Media.

At the time the charges were filed, Breingan was still reported to be residing overseas in the Calabasas area of Los Angeles and had not yet appeared in court. Media reports stated that no date had been set for his first court appearance and raised questions about whether he would return to New Zealand voluntarily or face extradition proceedings.

Breingan told the New Zealand Herald that he denies the charges against him by the SFO and said the matter was before the New Zealand courts.

In March 2026, the Serious Fraud Office revealed further details of the 33 charges, stating that 20 charges relate to allegedly using a forged document and the other 13 charges are of allegedly obtaining by deception. The SFO stated the alleged offending relates to the financing of 13 television programmes that were produced, or proposed to be produced, by Breingan through his now collapsed Stripe Studios companies.

==== Court proceedings ====
In August 2026, Breingan appeared in the Auckland District Court by video link from the United States and pleaded not guilty to all 33 charges. He elected a jury trial, which the court indicated was unlikely to take place before May 2028.

Breingan applied to have an outstanding warrant for his arrest withdrawn and sought permission to continue attending procedural hearings remotely from the United States. His lawyer said Breingan intended to return to New Zealand for trial. The SFO opposed both applications and said the outstanding arrest warrant was necessary for extradition proceedings it had initiated.

District Court Judge David Clark subsequently dismissed both applications, finding that the risk Breingan would not voluntarily return to New Zealand was too high. Clark ordered Breingan to return to New Zealand and attend future preliminary and substantive proceedings in person. The case was expected to proceed to a Crown case review in November 2026.

== Filmography ==
=== Television ===
Year	Title	Role	Notes
2015	100 Day Bach	Executive producer	
2017	Slice of Paradise	Associate producer	
2016–2020	The Cafe	Executive producer	
2019	100 Day Renovation	Executive producer	
2020	The Bach that JK built	Producer, director and writer	
2020	Dream Home Dilemma	Executive producer	
2021	Uncharted New Zealand	Executive producer and writer	
2019	Great Southern Truckers	Executive producer, director and writer	
2020–2024	The Circus	Executive producer and writer	
2022	Reunited	Executive producer and cowriter	
2022	Rich Listers	Executive producer and writer	
2022	Clubhouse Rescue	Executive producer	
2023	Snow Crew	Executive producer and writer	
