= Brunch (disambiguation) =

Brunch is a mid-morning meal, a combination of breakfast and lunch.

Brunch may also refer to:

- Brunch., the standard author abbreviation for Norwegian naturalist Jørgen Brunchorst (1862–1917)
- Brunch (album), a 1993 album by Wink
- Brunch (EP), a 1999 EP by Self
- Brunch (musical), 2009 rock musical about the New York City restaurant scene
- Brunch (TV program), 2012 New Zealand morning television program
- "Brunch" (How I Met Your Mother), 2006 episode of the American sitcom How I Met Your Mother
- Brunch Bar, a brand of cereal bars made by Cadbury
