= Hamish Dodd =

New Zealand interior designer and television and radio presenter

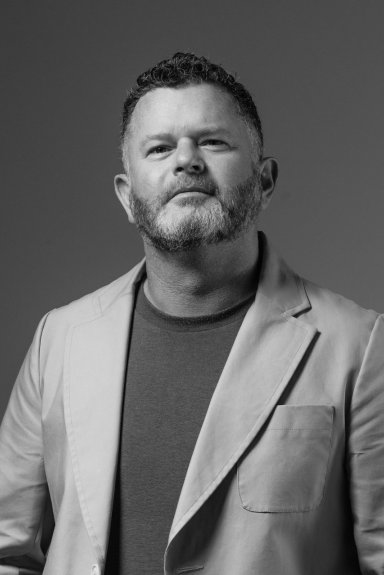
- Dodd in 2022
- Born: Hamish Morley Dodd; 25 May 1976 (age 50)
- Occupations: Broadcaster and interior designer
- Years active: 1999–present
- Spouse: Anita Dodd

Hamish Morley Dodd (born 25 May 1976) is a New Zealand celebrity interior designer, television and radio presenter. He is most notable for appearing on the New Zealand television show My House My Castle, as the interior designer. The show aired for ten years, from 1999 until the final season in 2009.

Since My House My Castle, Dodd continued to work as a television interior designer for various New Zealand television shows including Home Sick in 2008, an episode of The Apprentice New Zealand in 2010 and Get Growing with New Zealand Gardener in the same year.

In 2015, Dodd designed his own holiday home which became part of the television series, 100 Day Bach. In 2019, the follow-up, 100 Day Renovation was released.

Outside of his television career, Dodd co-hosted the Design & Build Show on Today FM, previously The DIY Experts and The Home & Garden Show.

== Early life and career ==
=== 1976 – 1993: Early life ===
Dodd was born in 1976 to interior designer Adrienne and accountant Paul.

With his father Paul teaching Hamish how to fly, Dodd gained an interest with becoming a Fighter pilot as a child. His father owned an old Warbird plane from Vietnam that Dodd flew as a child with his father.

=== 1993 – 1999: Early career ===
When Dodd was 17 years old after he finished school, his father enrolled him at Manukau Tech to study horticulture. He studied landscaping at a design school in London before returning to New Zealand to set up a design business with his mother Adrienne Dodd.

=== 1999 – 2009: My House My Castle ===
Dodd first appeared on television for the New Zealand series, Ground Force, appearing as the interior designer for an indoor-outdoor special for the series. Dodd was then asked to audition as the interior designer for My House My Castle. The show ran for ten seasons from 1999 up until 2009.

=== 2009 – 2022: Later projects ===
Since My House My Castle finished airing in 2009, Dodd has appeared on various other television shows which involve interior designing. In 2015, Dodd appeared in 100 Day Bach. The first series which included him and his wife, Anita.

In 2020, Dodd appeared again continuing his interior designing work on screen for the series, Dream Home Dilemma and The Bach that JK Built.

=== 2023: Clubhouse Rescue ===
In 2023, Dodd along with Israel Dagg and Stephen Donald appeared in the 2023 New Zealand television series, Clubhouse Rescue.

== Personal life ==
Dodd has a son, Hunter. He is married to Anita Dodd. 100 Day Bach https://nz.linkedin.com/in/anita-dodd-b2828537

== Television work ==
- Ground Force (1999)
- My House My Castle (10 seasons, 1999–2009)
- Home Sick (2008)
- The Apprentice New Zealand (Episode 7, 2010)
- Get Growing with New Zealand Gardener (2010)
- Brunch (2012)
- 100 Day Bach (2015)
- 100 Day Renovation (2019)
- The Café (2016–2020)
- Dream Home Dilemma (2020)
- The Bach that JK Built (2020)
- Clubhouse Rescue (2023)
