= Alex Gilbert (adoption advocate) =

New Zealand adoption advocate

- Gilbert in 2023
- Born: Gusovskoi Alexander Viktorovich; 1 April 1992 (age 34); Arkhangelsk, Russia
- Years active: 2011–present

YouTube information
- Channel: Alex Gilbert
- Genres: Adoption; Vlogs
- Subscribers: 49.5 thousand
- Views: 8.8 million
- Alex Gilbert's voice recorded April 2023 for BBC World Service
- Last updated: November 16, 2026
- Website: alexgilbert.co.nz and imadopted.org

Sasha Alexander Gilbert (Russian: Саша Александр "Алекс" Гилберт; born 1 April 1992) is a Russian-born New Zealand documentary series producer, writer and media presenter focused on adoption, best known as the founder of the online community I'm Adopted, which he established in 2015. His work includes public discussions and media projects related to adoption.

Gilbert, whose name at birth is Gusovskoi Alexander Viktorovich, was born in Arkhangelsk, where he was placed in a local orphanage for the first two years of his life until 1994, when he was adopted by his New Zealand parents. In 2013, Gilbert started searching for and located his Russian genetic parents, with whom he had no connection; his genetic father did not know about Gilbert's existence until Gilbert contacted him in 2013.

In 2015, Gilbert established I'm Adopted, an international support network that connects and supports people with personal experiences of adoption. Gilbert has been nominated for several awards for his adoption work, including Young New Zealander of the Year in 2018 and New Zealander of the Year in 2020.

Gilbert has made several appearances on television shows and documentaries about international adoption, and has written two books. Gilbert regularly publishes videos to his YouTube channel about his own story, as well as his award-winning documentary series An Adoption Story, which features the stories of others adopted, as told by themselves.

== Early life ==
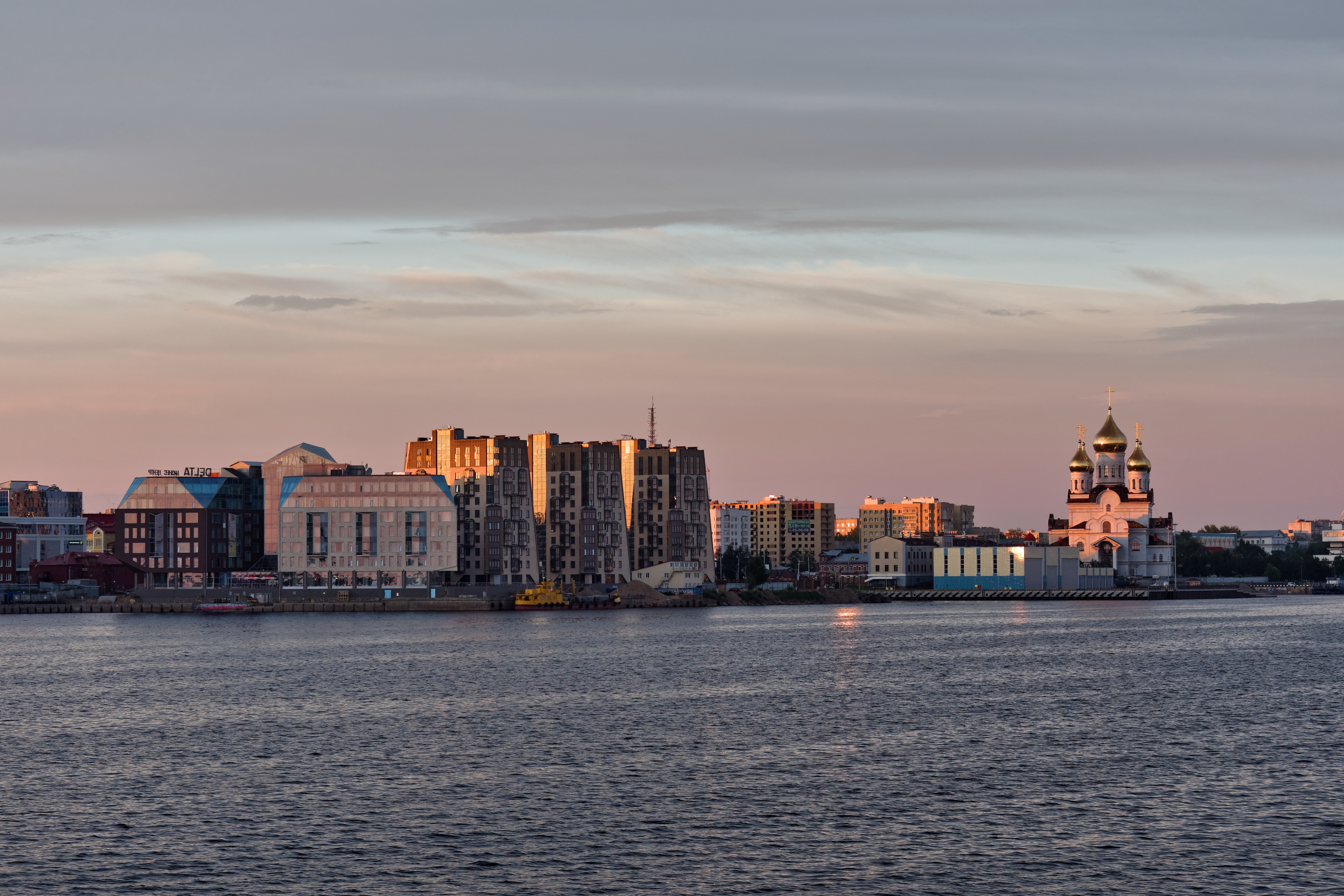
Arkhangelsk, Russia, the city were Alex Gilbert was born.

Alex Gilbert was born Gusovskoi Alexander Viktorovich on 1 April 1992 in Arkhangelsk, Russia, to Mihail Viktorovich Kovkov and Tatiana Taimurazovna Gusovskaia. Gilbert's mother placed him in an orphanage in Arkhangelsk after he was born. His genetic father Mihail did not know of Alexander's existence until 2013 after hearing through a series of online messages Alexander was searching for him. The father's name on Alexander's birth certificate and adoption papers had been falsified.

In 1994, New Zealand couple Mark and Janice Gilbert adopted Alexander and his brother Andrei. His name was legally changed to Sasha Alexander Gilbert in 1994. The Gilbert family lived in Whangārei, New Zealand, and Alex lived there until he was 18 years old. In early 2011, Gilbert moved to Auckland to study and work in television.

== Career ==
=== 2013–2014 ===
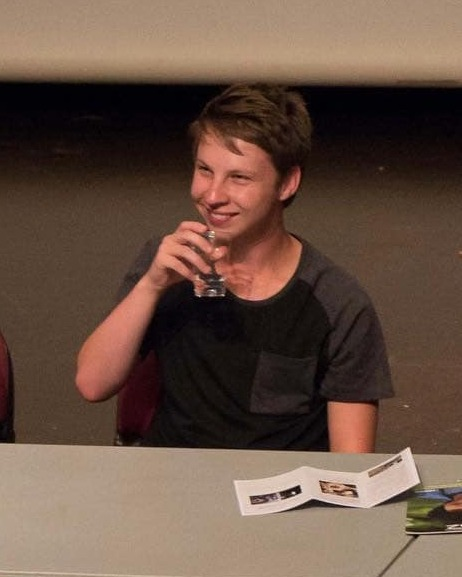
Gilbert in 2015

After an unsuccessful attempt in 2009, Gilbert recommenced his search for his birth parents in 2013. He used Russian social networking websites to locate them. In November 2013, Gilbert travelled to Russia to meet his birth parents for the first time.

Gilbert's trip and his meetings with his birth parents was filmed for New Zealand's TV One's current affairs show Sunday, and the report was broadcast in 2014. In the same year' Gilbert wrote and released his autobiographical book My Russian Side, along with an autobiographical documentary film.

=== 2015–2017 ===
In July 2015 Gilbert established an online community I'm Adopted to allow adopted people to share their stories. The project is a platform that helps adoptees around the world to share their personal experiences with adoption through social media. The project also holds meet-ups and events. Since 2019, I'm Adopted also produces a podcast.

At the end of 2015, Gilbert appeared on Russian television station 1TV's programme Let them Talk, where his biological parents met his New Zealand parents for the first time. The show highlighted the early impact of the organisation I'm Adopted. In February 2017, Gilbert was a key speaker at an event at the New Zealand Parliament to help raise awareness for I'm Adopted.

In October 2017 Gilbert went to Russia to visit the orphanage in Arkhangelsk for the first time since he left in 1994. He returned to the orphanage the following year. Gilbert also talked with adopted teenagers and parents in Moscow for the adoption charity Arifmetika Dobra.

In November 2017, Gilbert shared a video of his first meeting with his birth father on the social media platform Reddit; the video went viral and was published on the LADbible Facebook page.

=== 2018–2019 ===
In early 2018, Gilbert independently released his second autobiography I'm Adopted. A full-length interview that was based on the book was released in late June. Gilbert collected and hand-delivered supplies for his orphanage in Arkhangelsk, Russia, in October 2018.

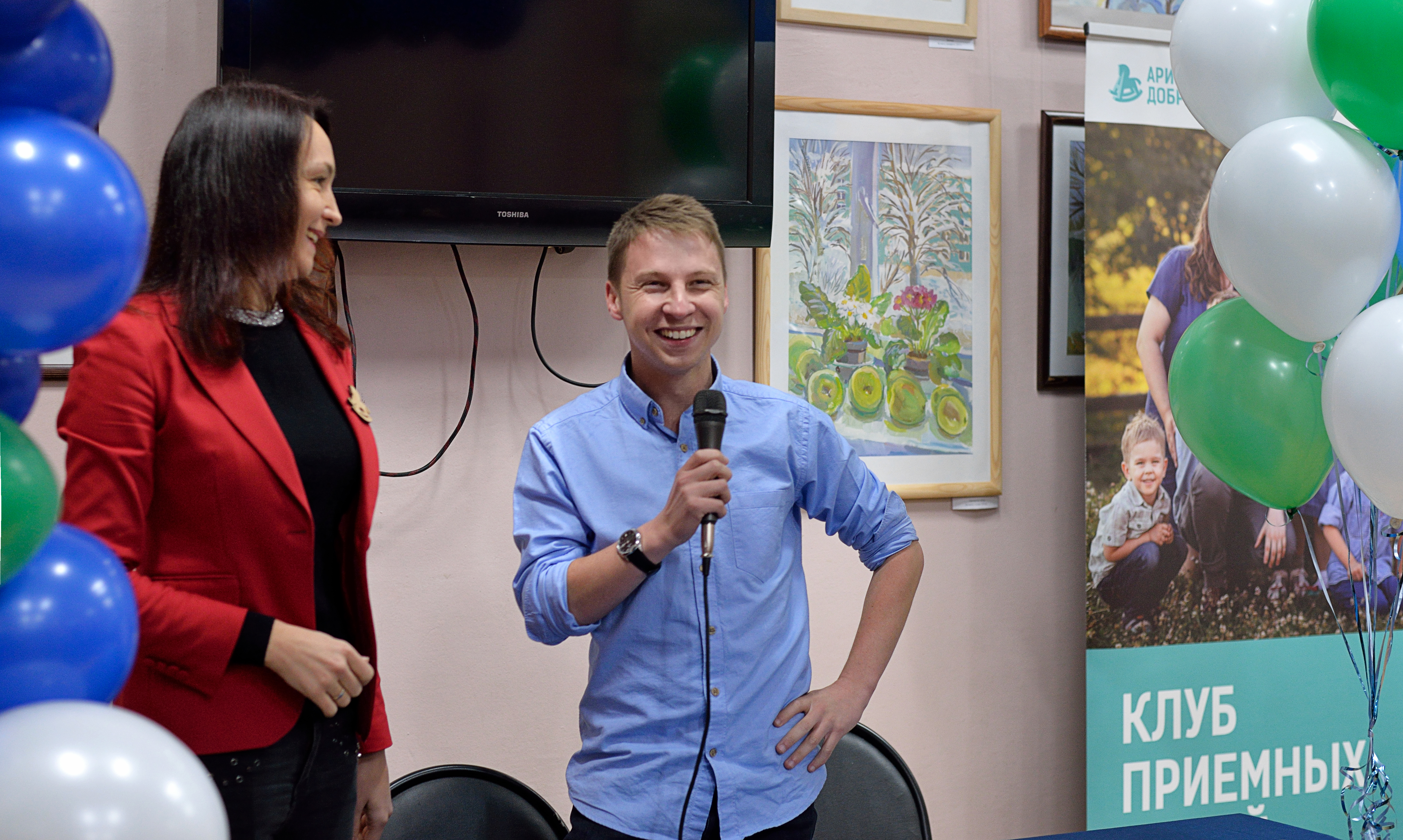
Gilbert speaking in Elektrostal, Russia, 2019

In January 2018, Gilbert appeared in the Russian documentary "The Man from Nowhere" which was directed by Russian journalist and documentary writer Katerina Gordeeva.

In July 2018, Gilbert spoke via video link at the International Conference on Adoption Research 6 in Montreal, Canada, and hosted the first I'm Adopted overseas meetup in Galway, Ireland, on 1 August 2018.

Also in 2018, Gilbert teamed up with the charity Arifmetika Dobra for another presentation with parents and adopted children. He was joined with Russian author Diana Mashkova. The event was held at Elektrostal inside of the Moscow region of Russia.

In January 2019, the Russian version of his autobiography titled «Я – приёмный сын» (I'm an Adopted Son) was released with a physical limited release with support of the Timchenko Foundation in Moscow, Russia. The book is published by Alpina Books, Russia, and a copy is held at the Russian State Library in Moscow.

=== 2020 ===
In September 2020, Gilbert contributed to the Rudd Adoption Program for the University of Massachusetts Amherst with his work with I'm Adopted.

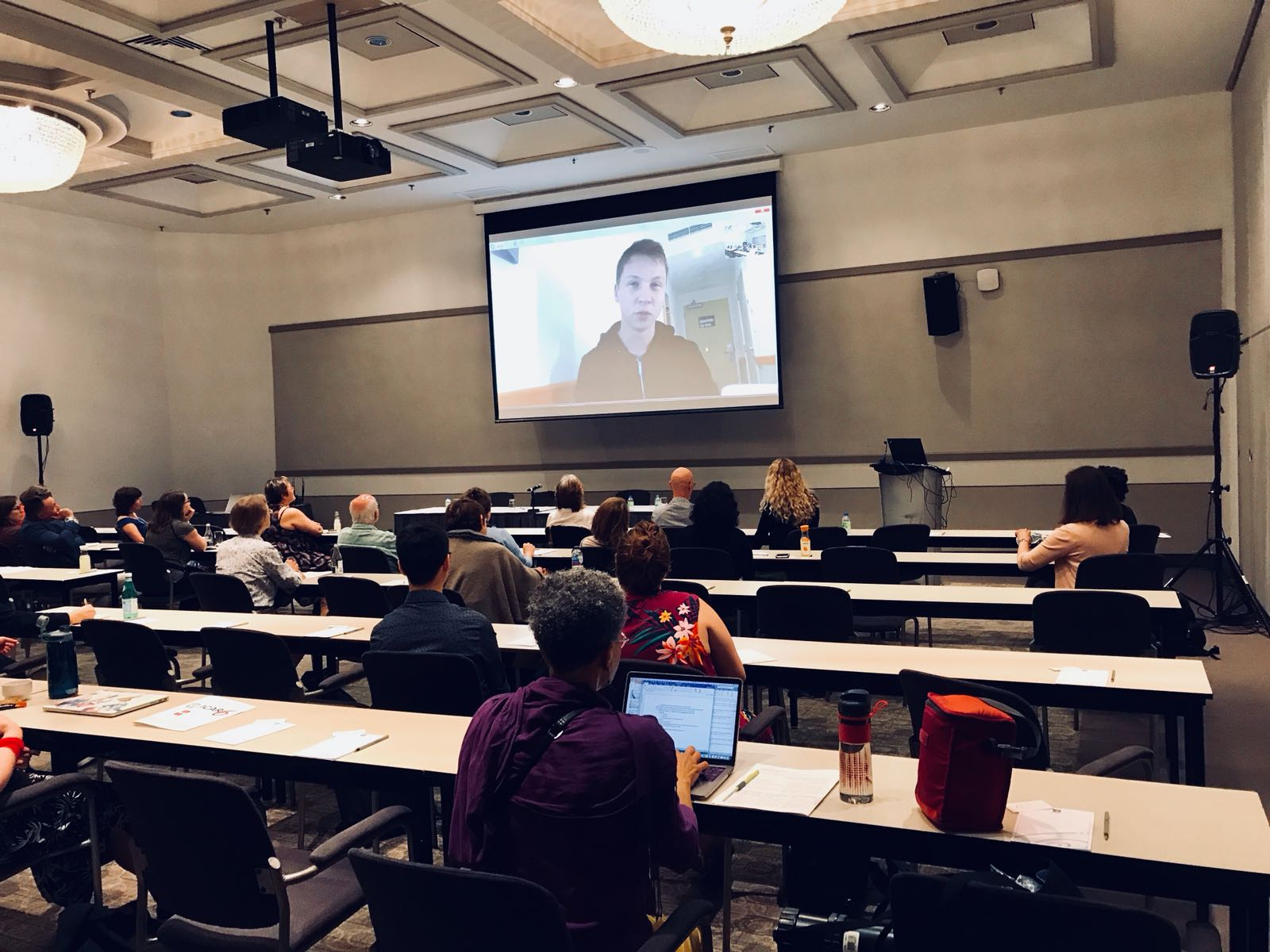
Gilbert speaking via video at the International Conference on Adoption Research 6 conference in Montreal, Canada, 2018

The following year, Gilbert was nominated for Young New Zealander of the Year for 2019, as well as a nomination for New Zealander of the Year.

Gilbert appeared in the Stuff documentary film Emma (2020), in which he helps a girl named Emma find her birth family in Russia. Emma then visits to Russia to meet her birth parents for the first time. In 2021, the documentary won the Best Documentary award at that year's Voyager Internet Media Awards.

=== 2021-2022 ===
In the beginning of 2021, Gilbert temporarily moved to Russia, living mostly in the Moscow region. Gilbert documented his time there by publishing videos to his YouTube channel. He also again met with his birth mother Tatiana in Rybinsk, as well as his birth father Mihail and his family in Saint Petersburg.

He had also visited Arkhangelsk, a village in Vladimir Oblast and Altai Krai in Western Siberia. Gilbert also completed filming for Reunited during his time there. After almost six months, by the end of July 2021, Gilbert returned to New Zealand.

In September 2019, TVNZ announced Gilbert would be hosting a television series called Reunited. The show focuses on his work with I'm Adopted and the help with adopted people finding their birth families. Filming for the series finished in 2021. Gilbert also served as a writer and narrator for the series. Season One aired in February 2022 on TVNZ 1; it had a positive reception, noting Gilberts compassion towards the adopted person. The series was noted for its cinematography.

=== 2023-present ===
From November 2022, Gilbert began to publish his first online ongoing documentary series An Adoption Story through his YouTube channel. The series follows Alex as he meets other adoptees to share their stories. Series one was filmed in New Zealand, the United States and Italy. The second series for An Adoption Story began in June 2024. Stories from the series have included those adopted from inside of New Zealand domestically and from overseas. A story included a man from Tauranga who found out he was adopted at age 48, to then discovering his Māori heritage.

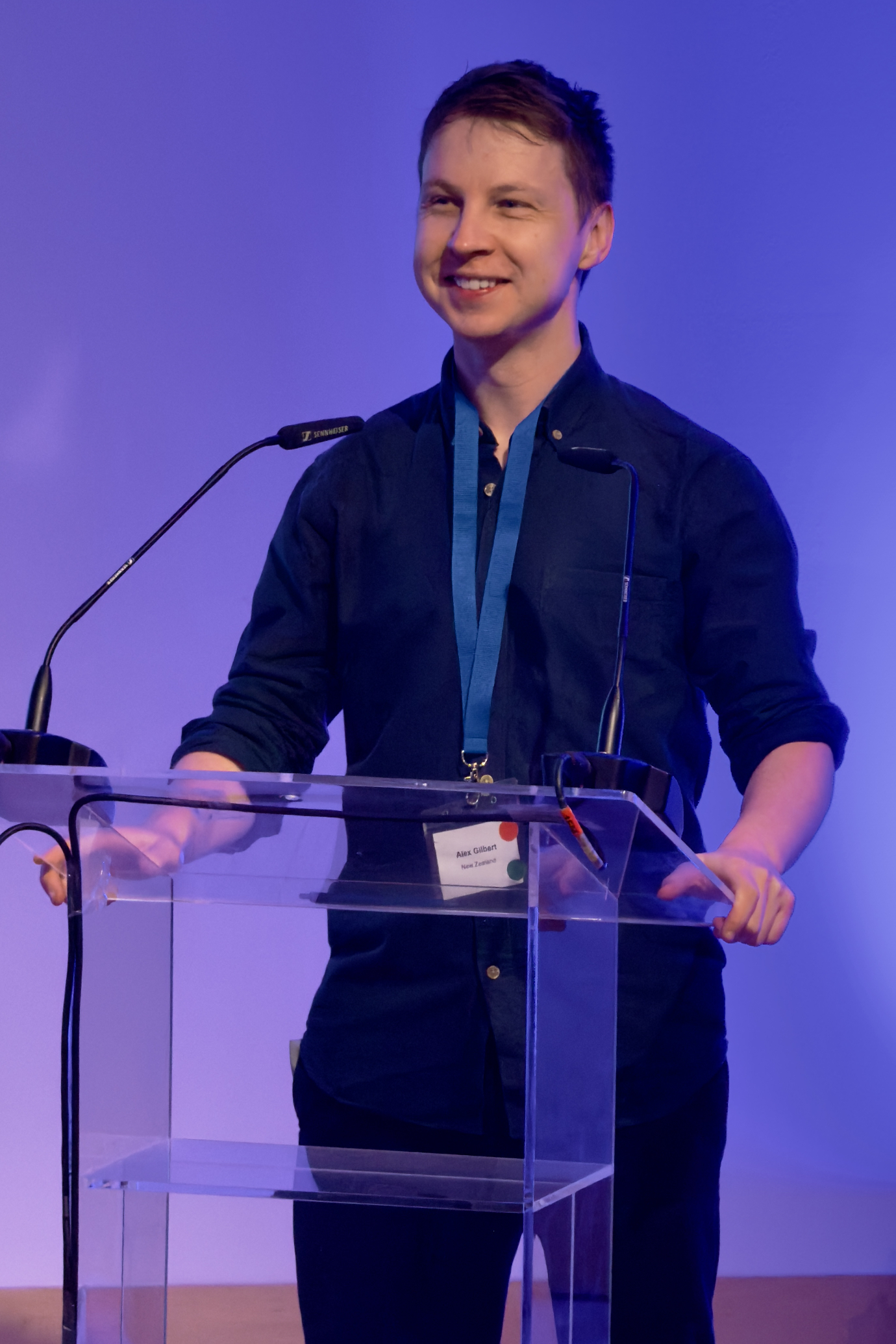
Gilbert at ICAR9, Porto, Portugal, 2026

Another episode included an adoptee who had been separated from her two brothers since birth and was previously unaware of their existence, met for the first time. A story was shared in April 2025 for the series which Alex helped an adoptee born in Velikiye Luki, Russia during the Soviet Union learn about the fate of his birth mother. Gilbert has spoken publicly about the complexities of adoption and those affected in stories published.

Gilberts documentary short film, My Kazakhstan Connection which follows the story of Gilbert searching for his biological family links in Kazakhstan was released in September 2025.

In January 2026, the third season of An Adoption Story began, with episodes continuing to be released on Gilbert's YouTube channel. The second episode featured Tauranga woman Daniela Brown, who was adopted from Romania and documented her search for her birth family. In April 2026, the episode was officially selected for NZ Web Fest in the Factual category.

In July 2026, Gilbert presented his work and introduced a symposium at the 9th International Conference on Adoption Research which was held in Porto, Portugal.

In November 2026, Gilbert's documentary series An Adoption Story won the award for Best Series in the Factual Series category at the 2026 NZ Web Fest.

== Personal life ==
Alex Gilbert is of East European, Russian, Baltic and West Asian ancestry. Gilbert noted on his Facebook page the impact of the 2022 Russian invasion on his family in Russia and his relatives living in a village north of Kyiv, Ukraine. Gilbert's relatives in Ukraine are the brother and niece of his birth mother Tatiana.

In May 2023, Gilbert went to the Kazakh village Tulkibas to trace his family origins in a search for his biological grandmother.

Gilbert is currently in a relationship. His partner went with him while he documented his search for his family origins in Kazakhstan for My Kazakhstan Connection. She also helped document the journey.

== Awards ==
In 2018, Gilbert was nominated for Young New Zealander of the Year as part of the 2019 New Zealander of the Year Awards, as well as for New Zealander of the Year. He received a certificate of achievement from the Ministry of Health of the Arkhangelsk region in Russia for his orphanage initiative in November 2018.

In November 2020, Gilbert became a finalist in the Global category for the 2020 New Zealand Impact Awards.

In 2026, An Adoption Story received the Best Series award in the Factual Series category at NZ Web Fest.

== Books ==
- My Russian Side (Моя Русская семья) (2014) ISBN 978-1-32-002582-9
- I'm Adopted (Я — приемный сын) (2018) ISBN 978-1-9835-1900-0

== Filmography ==
Television / Films
Year	Title	Notes
2014	Sunday	
2014	My Russian Side	Documentary film
2015	Anatomy of the Day	
2015	Let Them Talk	Season 15, Episode 68
2015	Sunday	
2016	Breakfast	
2017	TV Rain	TV special about adoption
2018	The Man from Nowhere	Russian documentary
2018	I'm Adopted - The Interview w/ Meg Andrews	
2018	Live on Air	
2019	Seven Sharp	
2020	Emma - A Stuff Circuit documentary	
2021	The Search	Russian documentary
2022	Reunited	Series / Host and Writer
2025	My Kazakhstan Connection	
2022–present	An Adoption Story	
