= Mashkov =

Mashkov (Russian: Машков, masculine) or Mashkova (Russian: Машкова, feminine) is a Russian surname that may refer to the following notable people:

- Anatoly Mashkov (born 1944), Soviet speed skater
- Diana Mashkova (born 1977), Russian journalist, writer and author
- Ilya Mashkov (1881–1944), Russian artist
- Ivan Mashkov (1867–1945), Russian architect and preservationist
- Roman Mashkov (1922–1971), commander of an intelligence platoon in World War II, Hero of the Soviet Union
- Tatyana Mashkova (born 1983), Kazakhstani beach volleyball player
- Vladimir Mashkov (born 1963), Russian actor
