= Reunited (New Zealand TV series) =

New Zealand TV Series

- Reunited Title Card
- Genre: Documentary
- Written by: Alex Breingan; Matthew Metcalfe; Penny Ashbook; Alex Gilbert
- Directed by: Glen Broomhall
- Presented by: Alex Gilbert
- Narrated by: Alex Gilbert
- Country of origin: New Zealand
- Original languages: English; Russian
- No. of seasons: 1
- No. of episodes: 6

Production
- Executive producers: Alex Breingan; Matthew Metcalfe
- Production company: Stripe Studios

Original release
- Network: TVNZ 1
- Release: 1 February – 8 March 2022

Reunited is a New Zealand television series. Presented by adoption advocate Alex Gilbert, the series follows six Russian-born adoptees on their own personal story of re-connecting with their birth families. It first aired on TVNZ 1 in February, 2022. Gilbert also serves as the narrator for the series and as one of the writers.

== Episodes ==
No.	Title	Original release date
1	"Viktoria"	February 1, 2022
Alex Gilbert helps Viktoria Rundle search for her birth mother. Going back to Russia in the middle of the Arctic chill, Viktoria is confronted with some news she didn't expect.
2	"Daria"	February 8, 2022
Alex Gilbert helps Russian-American adoptee Daria Rottenberk search for her birth parents in Saint Petersburg. What she finds out in Russia isn't what she expected.
3	"Anya"	February 15, 2022
Anya Gibson has always struggled with unanswered questions. Born in Saint Petersburg, Russia, Anya is determined to know what happened years ago with her grandmother before she was placed in an orphanage.
4	"Siblings, Erin and Nick"	February 22, 2022
Erin and Nick were both adopted from the Siberian city of Barnaul and raised in America by their adoptive mother. Now both in their 20s, they have asked Alex Gilbert to help them find their birth families.
5	"Anna"	March 1, 2022
Anna Calhoun was adopted at the age of only 14 months from the Russian town of Abinsk. Raised in Birmingham, Alabama, Anna has always been curious to know what happened with her birth family.
6	"The Gilbert Family"	March 8, 2022
Alex Gilbert takes on a personal challenge when his adoptive brother Andrei wants to connect with his birth family.

== Reception ==
In a review from stuff.co.nz, Reunited was mentioned with Alex Gilbert being adopted himself, he shows compassion with each adopted person during the series. It has also been noted for its cinematography work.
