= April in the Afternoon =

Original release
- Network: Living
- Release: April 1, 2008

April in the Afternoon is a talk show on Sky Television's Living channel in New Zealand.
