= Mel Homer =

New Zealand television and radio presenter

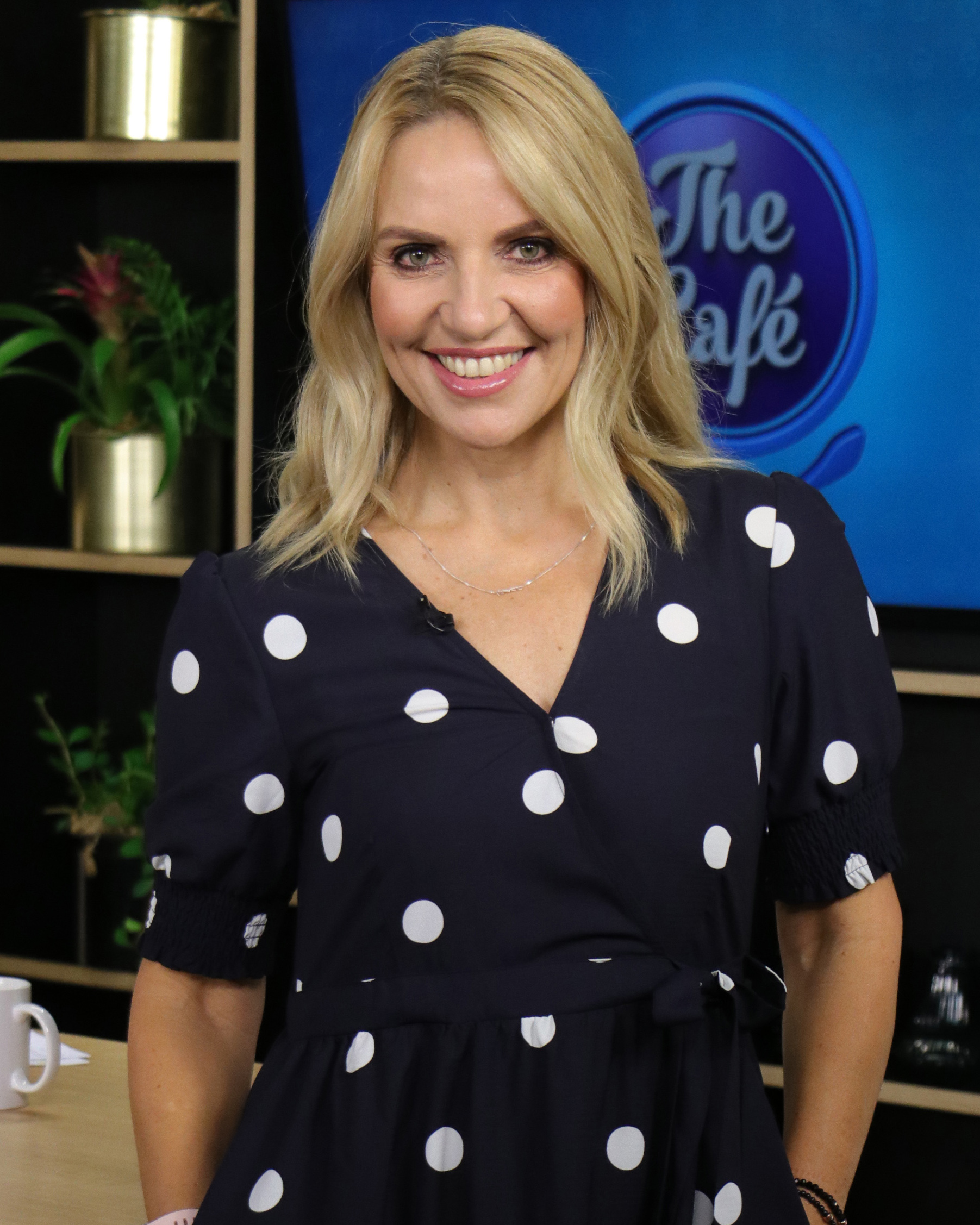
- Homer in 2020
- Born: Melanie Homer; July 10, 1970 (age 56)
- Years active: 2015–present
- Spouse: Andy Pilcher
- Children: 3

Melanie Homer (born July 10, 1970) is a New Zealand radio presenter, television presenter, writer and master of ceremonies.

She was previously the host the New Zealand Radio show, Sunday Cafe that aired on the now defunct network Today FM. She previously hosted Three's morning show The Café with Mike Puru and Carly Flynn from 2016 until 2020.

She also previously presented the morning radio show on Mix 98.2. Homer began her career as a producer for Breakfast Radio at Classic Hits (now known as The Hits) in the late 1990s.

Homer has also previously worked in Hong Kong at Radio Television Hong Kong (RTKH) from 1998 to 2004. In 2023 Homer appeared on Celebrity Treasure Island.

Homer was previously a chief reporter for the radio network Mediaworks in New Zealand. She then went on to host The House of Wellness on The Breeze.

== Career ==
=== Radio ===
Homer has previously been the morning radio host for New Zealand's Mix98. Before this, she previously worked for The Hits, Newstalk ZB and Radio Hauraki And Magic Talk.

Homer hosted the New Zealand Radio Show, Sunday Cafe on Today FM. The station shut down on 30 March 2023.

Homer currently hosts The House of Wellness on The Breeze.

=== Television ===
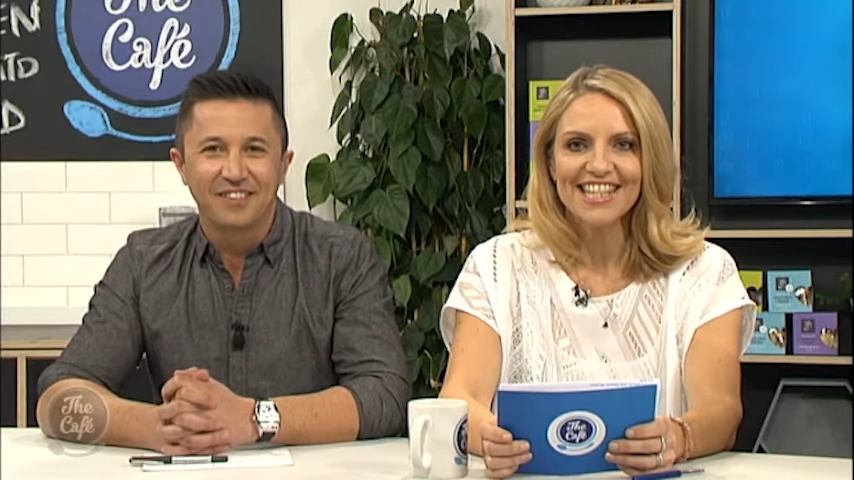
Homer with Mike Puru in 2016 for The Cafe

In 2015 Homer was the host for a show on eden (previously known as Choice TV) called My Dream Room. From the start of April 2016, Homer began hosting the Three morning show The Café originally with Mike Puru until May 2020 to then with Carly Flynn from June 2020. The series finished at the end of 2020.

In 2023 Homer appeared on the 2023 series of Celebrity Treasure Island. She was the 12th person eliminated from the season.

== Personal life ==
Homer spent six years in Hong Kong, from 1998 to 2004. She worked at Radio Television Hong Kong during this period.

She has three boys, Jesse, Finn and Tom. One of whom was born in Hong Kong.

She is married to New Zealand sailmaker Andy Pilcher. They both have regularly been involved with Yacht races with their boat, the 'Kaimai Flyer'.

Homer family history traces back to Ireland. In 2019 she began to trace her family from Ireland to revisiting again in 2022.

=== Cancer diagnosis ===
In July 2025, Homer shared that she was diagnosed with acute myeloid leukaemia. In January 2026, she confirmed that a suitable donor had been identified and that she was preparing to undergo a stem cell transplant. She underwent the transplant in late January 2026. The transplant was by an anonymous French donor.

In May 2026, Homer shared that she no longer showed signs of leukaemia after her recovery from her stem cell transplant.
