= Mike Puru =

New Zealand broadcaster

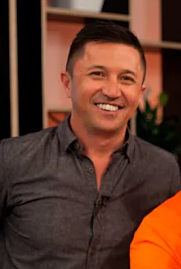
- Puru in 2017
- Born: Michael Puru; 20 August 1975 (age 51); Gore, New Zealand
- Education: St Peter's College (1987–1993)
- Years active: 1995–present
- Known for: New Zealand radio and television work
- Partner: Anton Chartier (2014–present)

Mike Puru (born 20 August 1975) is a New Zealand television personality, radio host and weather presenter.

Puru worked at the New Zealand radio station The Edge from 1995 until 2015 and hosted the first two seasons of The Bachelor New Zealand on TV3. He co-hosted the morning television show The Cafe along with Mel Homer from 2016 until 2020.

Mike previously hosted the Flava breakfast show alongside Stacey Morrison, Azura Lane and previously Anika Moa. Before this, Puru along with Morrison and Moa hosted the afternoon show on The Hits radio station.

Since 2024 Puru has been hosting the weekday morning show for the New Zealand radio network The Breeze.

== Early life ==
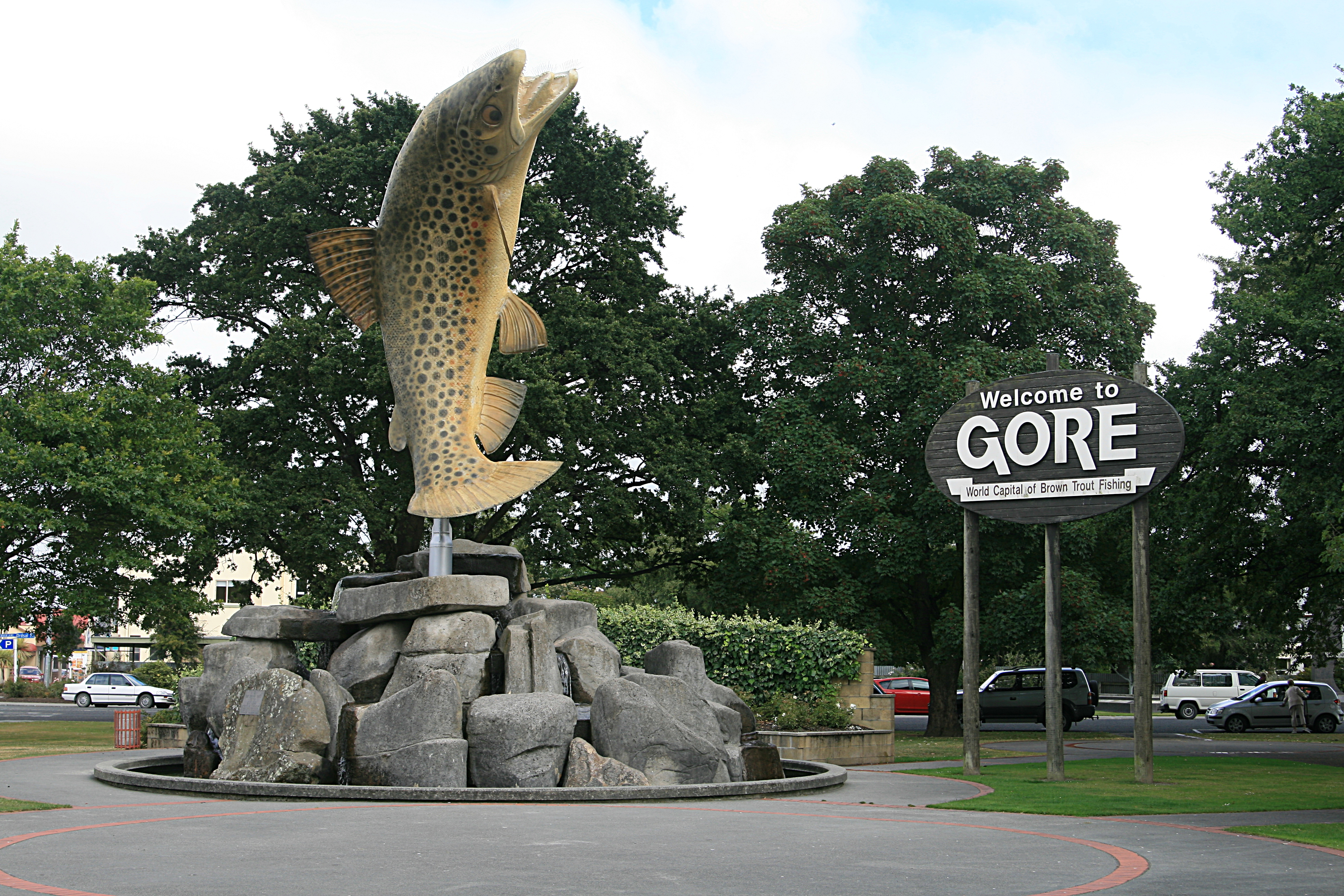
Gore, New Zealand, where Puru was born

Michael Puru was born on 20 August 1975 in Gore, a town and district in the Southland region in the South Island of New Zealand. Puru was born to Wayne and Diana. His father Wayne grew up in Ōpōtiki and who is of Te Whānau-ā-Apanui and Ngāpuhi descent. Puru is the second of three children: he has an elder sister Gloria and a younger sister Kelli.

His family lived in the small town of Waikoikoi, New Zealand until he was nine years old. Puru attended St Peter's College in Gore from 1987 to 1993. When Puru was a young boy he was a local paperboy in Gore.

== Early career and education ==
Puru started working in radio and television after he finished high school in 1993. Puru set up an hour-long radio show for St Peter's College to present weekly events from Invercargill.

Mike also had involvement with the Gore Operatic Society, which is now known as the Gore Musical Theatre.

During his final year at St Peter's College, Puru became head boy, and then left to pursue his career in radio and television by attending NZ Broadcasting School. He later moved to Hamilton for seven years and then to Auckland.

== Career ==
=== 1995–2002: Early radio career ===
In 1995 Puru began his radio career as a Radio DJ for the New Zealand radio station The Edge. The first song that Puru introduced on the station in 1995 was "Back for Good" by the English pop group Take That. He worked alongside Dom Harvey and Jay-Jay Feeney for the morning show at The Edge. Puru moved to Auckland to work for the station.

=== 2002–2004: Flipside ===
In 2002 while still being a Radio DJ for The Edge Puru began co-hosting the youth-oriented current affairs show Flipside, also known as Flipside Live which aired on TVNZ 2, known then as TV2. Puru co-hosted the show alongside fellow television presenter Evie Ashton. New Zealand television presenter Sonya Gray also appeared on the show as a reporter. Flipside aired as a "two-screen" approach, targeted for youth audiences.

While the show aired on television, news was also shared through its own dedicated page on the now defunct New Zealand news website "nzoom.com". "nzoom.com" later changed to the 1News website for TVNZ.

=== 2004–2012: Sing Like a Superstar and television hiatus ===
After Flipside finished in 2004 Puru continued working as a Radio DJ for The Edge. He made an appearance as one of the singers on the television show Sing Like a Superstar which aired in 2005 on Three, known then as TV3. Puru said that around this time viewers who watched him on Flipside would write in letters about his teeth. Puru later got his teeth done but was not sure if his appearance on Sing Like a Superstar or not fixing his teeth at the time was the reason as to why he was not able to get more television work around this period of his career.

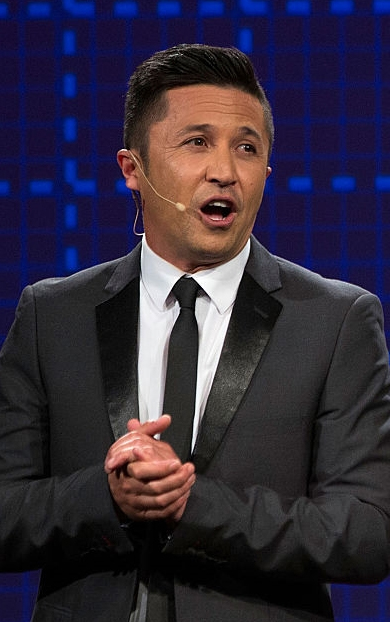
Puru in 2014

=== 2012–2016: Yesshop ===
In October 2012, he became one of the inaugural TV presenters on New Zealand's first, but short-lived Yesshop home shopping channel. A career highlight included interviewing Eva Longoria live on air during the Hollywood star's brief first visit to New Zealand as a guest of the shopping channel.

=== 2015: Leaving The Edge ===
On 7 December 2015, Puru announced he was leaving The Edge, and did so officially on 11 December. He was replaced by Clinton Randell and the station's breakfast show was renamed The Jay-Jay, Dom & Randell Show.

=== 2016–2023: The Bachelor & The Café morning show ===
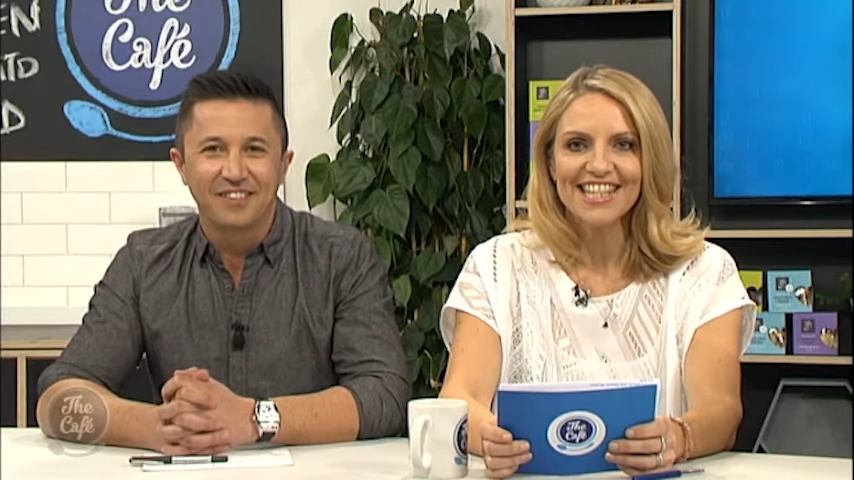
Puru co-hosting with Mel Homer for The Café in 2016

In 2016 Puru continued as host for the second season of The Bachelor, but was not selected to host its third season. He was co-host of Three's morning show The Café with Mel Homer from 2016 until May 2020.

Puru became a part time weather presenter for Newshub. He continued this role until its closure in July 2024.

Puru became a host of The Hits along with Stacey Morrison in 2019. Anika Moa joined the show later in 2019 but left in late 2022. In 2022 they all moved to the Flava breakfast show with Azura Lane who replaced Anika Moa. Puru left the show in December 2022.

=== 2024 – present: The Breeze ===
Puru continued to work as a part-time weather presenter for Newshub until the closure in July 2024. At the start of 2024 Puru began hosting the morning weekday radio show on The Breeze.

== Personal life ==
=== Relationships ===
Puru came out on air as gay in 2010, and shortly after he announced his engagement to his partner of eight years, Regan Wallis. However, in May 2012 he confirmed the relationship was over. Puru has been in a long-term relationship with Anton Chartier since 2014. They both reside in Arch Hill, Auckland along with their dog Rufus.

=== Hospitalisation ===
In 2019 Puru suffered a broken rib and concussion after crashing his bike. He was hospitalised at Auckland Hospital after being found unconscious. Puru's helmet was damaged in the crash which he believes saved him from a more serious injury.

=== Proposed bed and breakfast in France ===
In August 2023, Puru announced that he would be moving with his partner Anton to France in 2024 where they both plan to run a Bed and Breakfast and to launch a country music radio station. He however later cancelled his plans with moving.

=== Father's cancer diagnosis ===
Puru shared that his father Wayne was diagnosed with cancer of the liver and bowels. He said that the diagnosis came “out of the blue”. Puru's father Wayne started feeling unwell towards the end of 2023.

== See also ==
- List of New Zealand television personalities
