= Carly Flynn =

New Zealand journalist and TV personality

- Born: Carly Kirkwood; 1978 (age 47–48); Taupō, New Zealand
- Occupation: Television journalist
- Notable credit(s): The Café; Sunrise; Nightline
- Spouse: Dave Flynn

Carly Flynn (née Kirkwood) is a New Zealand journalist and television personality.

== Personal life ==
Born and raised in Taupō, New Zealand, where both of her parents were English teachers at Tauhara College, Flynn is the eldest of the three siblings. She completed a Bachelor of MediArts majoring in journalism from Waikato Polytech (now WINTEC) and a Diploma in Journalism from the Journalists Training Organisation.

She married cameraman Dave Flynn on Sunday, 22 October 2006. They have three children, Tilly, Jude and Freddie.

== Career ==
Flynn began her career in print journalism for the Herald community group newspapers before working for Counties Manukau Radio station then reporting, presenting and producing for Prime TV's Waikato and Bay of Plenty regional news.

She travelled extensively, with a stint living and working in Dublin where she worked for local radio station Newstalk 106 as well as You're A Star, an Irish pop star programme, before returning to New Zealand where she began as a reporter for 3 News.

She presented NZ News Week, a half-hour weekly wrap of New Zealand's top news stories, produced by TV3 for Sky News Australia and the TV3 website, before this was discontinued in early 2007.

On 14 March 2005, Flynn took over as the presenter on TV3's late-night news programme Nightline, replacing long-time TV3 presenter Carolyn Robinson, who became 3 News' weekend presenter. Flynn also continued to file reports for the show at the same time as presenting.

Flynn left the role at Nightline on 7 September 2007 to host TV3's short lived breakfast show, Sunrise. Sunrise began on 2 October 2007 and she co-hosted the show with James Coleman, but from 6 October 2008 she began hosting alongside news presenter Oliver Driver. Sunrise went off the air on 8 April 2010 as it was not financially sustainable.

In 2012, she was appointed as co-host of Three consumer affairs show Target alongside Brooke Howard-Smith taking over from Jeanette Thomas. Target has been off the air since 2013.

In 2019, Flynn joined as a co-host for the Three Morning Show The Café as one of the hosts with Mel Homer. The series finished at the end of 2020.

== See also ==
- List of New Zealand television personalities
