= 100 Day Renovation =

New Zealand reality TV show

- Title Card
- Genre: Renovation
- Presented by: Hamish Dodd
- Starring: Hamish Dodd; Alex Breingan; Rachel Hart
- Narrated by: Hamish Dodd
- Country of origin: New Zealand
- No. of seasons: 1
- No. of episodes: 8

Production
- Executive producer: Alex Breingan
- Producer: Rachel Hart
- Production locations: Hibiscus Coast, New Zealand
- Cinematography: Marcus Clayton
- Running time: 44 minutes
- Production company: Stripe Media

Original release
- Network: Prime Television
- Release: March 9, 2019

100 Day Renovation is a 2019 New Zealand home renovation reality TV show broadcast on SKY Open, previously known as Prime Television.

The series follows television couple Alex Breingan and Rachel Hart as they renovate their house in 100 days. The series is hosted by Hamish Dodd.

The show is part of the 100 Day Home series.

It is the follow-up to 100 Day Bach, which was released in 2015.
