= Jaime Ridge =

New Zealand celebrity

Jaime Dillon Ridge
- Born: 1993 (age 32–33); Manly, New South Wales, Australia
- Education: Diocesan School for Girls, King's College, The University of Auckland
- Occupations: Fashion blogger, former model,
- Known for: Dillon Dot, The Ridges
- Partner: Tommy Bates
- Parent(s): Matthew, and Sally Ridge

Jaime Dillon Ridge (born 1993) is a New Zealand fashion blogger and owns the blog Dillon Dot. She has appeared in several Australasian fashion magazines, including Badlands and Denizen.

== Early life and education ==
Ridge was born in Manly, Australia in 1993 but the family returned to New Zealand in 1997 so Matthew could captain the Auckland Warriors. Ridge's parents are New Zealand rugby player and former All Black Matthew Ridge, and Sally Ridge. Growing up, Ridge was often in the public eye and appeared in gossip magazines.

After moving to New Zealand, Ridge was educated at Diocesan School for Girls. In 2010, she moved to Diocesan's brother school, King's College. Ridge also holds a Bachelor of Commerce from the University of Auckland.

Due to financial pressure following her split with Adam Parore, Ridge chose to go directly to university after Year 12, so Sally could save the over $20,000 annual fees charged to attend King's College.

== Career ==
=== Dillon Dot ===
Jaime started her personal style blog Dillon Dot in 2015 after having gained a considerable Instagram following. She had previously worked as a fashion and beauty account manager for an Auckland PR firm.

=== The Ridges ===
In 2012, age 19, Ridge and her mother starred in their own six-part reality television show The Ridges, based around their everyday lives. She was reportedly paid $24,000 for the series.

While the first episode debuted in the top five evening shows, the show quickly fell in the ratings. Despite the finale regaining viewers, in early 2013 TV3 announced the show would not be renewed for a second series.

=== Modelling ===
Ridge did some modelling for the clothing company that Sally and Parore established in 2004 and describes modelling in print media, catwalks and music videos as a temporary side job. Along with Sally, Ridge is represented by agent Sara Tetro.

== Personal life and family ==
Ridge claimed that while Sally and she were best friends, she hadn't spoken to her father in years. Ridge has expressed sadness at not meeting new half-brother London Ridge, father Matthew's son with then-partner Carly Binding, former member of New Zealand girl group TrueBliss and solo artist. Ridge and Matthew had reconciled by early 2014.

In February 2014, Ridge and mother Sally spoke out against online bullying following the death of New Zealand celebrity Charlotte Dawson. Previously, Ridge had publicly criticised an opinion article speculating as to the cause of Dawson's death.

ONE News reported Ridge as being one of the most followed New Zealanders on social media.

In August 2014, Jaime collaborated on a jewellery line for women and men with local designer Lindi Kingi.

== Charity work ==
During The Ridges, Ridge agreed to participate in a charity Boxing match. The show covered Ridge training for 7 weeks with father Matthew's former-Warrior teammate Monty Betham at Boxing Alley gym in Auckland. Ridge was pressured to lose 5 kg in one week, dropping to just over 60 kg. The show culminated in Ridge winning the 'KFC Godfather of All Fight Nights' match against fellow TV3 reality television star Rosanna Arkle of The GC.

In November 2013 Ridge acted as the face of Dress for Success Auckland's charitable fundraiser sale The Great Designer Sale.

In August 2014, Ridge produced a piece of art for ANZ Daffodil Day Art Auction charity art auction. The proceeds of the auction went to the Cancer Society of New Zealand.

== See also ==
- Celebutante
- WAGs
