= 100 Day Bach =

- 100 Day Bach Title Card
- Created by: Stripe Productions
- Directed by: Marcus Clayton
- Presented by: Hamish Dodd
- Narrated by: Robert Scott
- Opening theme: Straight to the Top (Hey, hey, hey) by Tim McMorris
- Country of origin: New Zealand
- No. of seasons: 1
- No. of episodes: 8

Production
- Executive producer: Alex Breingan
- Producer: Rachel Hart
- Production locations: Kuratau, New Zealand
- Camera setup: Marcus Clayton, Isaac Strati
- Running time: 24 minutes
- Production company: Stripe Productions

Original release
- Network: ChoiceTV
- Release: 18 September – 6 November 2015

Related
- 100 Day Renovation (2019)

100 Day Bach is a 2015 New Zealand home renovation reality TV show. The series follows New Zealand celebrity Interior designer and presenter Hamish Dodd as he works on building and designing a holiday home in 100 days with the help of his wife, at the time, his partner Anita Dodd.

From August 2017 the show appeared on Netflix in Canada, India, Ireland, South Africa, the United Kingdom and the United States.

100 Day Bach is the first series which is part of the 100 Day Home series. The follow-up series to 100 Day Bach is 100 Day Renovation which aired in 2019.

== Synopsis ==
Interior designer Hamish Dodd and wife, at the time, his partner Anita Dodd purchased some property in Kuratau, New Zealand in late 2014. This developed the idea to film the project for 100 Day Bach. The aim of the series is to get their holiday home built in under 100 days. As mentioned throughout the series, Dodd grew up with his own family in Kuratau as a child.

== Production ==
The television show was filmed over the New Zealand winter in 2015. They made the decision to build during the winter the previous summer.
