= Home Front (TV series) =

- Presented by: Alison Mau; Jayne Kiely; Dave Cull; Sally Ridge
- Country of origin: New Zealand

Original release
- Network: TV1
- Release: 6 July 2000 – 2005

Home Front is a lifestyle television series that aired on TVNZ's channel Television One in New Zealand. It combines "home makeover" ideas, home maintenance and DIY tips, and guided tours around the homes of well-known New Zealanders. The series premiered on 6 July 2000 with several series of 13 episodes each.

Home Front was hosted by Jayne Kiely, Dave Cull, and Sally Ridge, each of whom covered a particular area of the show. Kiely was the primary presenter, and also presented the guided tours. Cull presented hints and advice for DIYers (do-it-yourselfers), and Ridge presented the home makeovers section of the show.

Originally hosted by Alison Mau, until she left TVNZ for Prime Television, this series was hugely successful for TV One. A rushed reshoot, of Jayne Kiely fronting many stories previously shot using Alison Mau, added to the demise of the series when it was finally axed in 2005.
