= Target (New Zealand TV series) =

- Starring: Carly Flynn, Brooke Howard-Smith
- Country of origin: New Zealand

Production
- Running time: 30 minutes

Original release
- Network: TV3
- Release: February 1999 – 7 August 2012

Target was a New Zealand consumer advice show. It was hosted by Carly Flynn and Brooke Howard-Smith. The show ran for 14 seasons from 1999 to 2012, and remained one of New Zealand's highest rated factual programs and had won one Qantas Media Award.

Hosts included Leanne Malcolm, Ian Orchard, Greg Boyed and Janet Wilson.

== Hidden camera trials ==
This has been a major part of the show since the launch of Target in 1999. It is used to reveal trades people and shops misconduct and illegal behaviour, including urinating in showers.

=== Retail trials ===
In these trials, young actors under the age of 18 are sent into a store to purchase an item restricted to persons aged 18 or over, such as cigarettes, pornographic material and alcohol. The actor is given an expired EFTPOS card or less change than required to purchase the item, so they do not purchase the items in question. (To avoid legal consequences to Target and the actor since the trials are not legally-sanctioned controlled purchase operations).

In the 2009 Christchurch liquor trial, there was a record broken for the youngest ever actor used in the trial: a 10-year-old girl, who was allowed to buy alcohol.

=== Hidden camera house trials ===
Target has its own hidden camera house, which is located in a different area of New Zealand each season. The house has hidden cameras throughout and is used to send various tradesmen there to carry out work. The tradesmen are left in the home alone while the occupant of the house goes out. Jobs can range from repairing appliances in the home to building, electrical or plumbing work. The test is not only to see the standard of the work carried out but also the actions of the worker, whether they wander into rooms of the house they have no reason to be in, and whether the worker acts in a professional manner.

In March 2011, the house that Target uses for filming in Tauranga was uncovered by an electrician who had been called to fit a power point in the bedroom. The electrician started the job but quickly suspected something was out of the ordinary when he noticed a diary lying open next to where he was working, bikinis on the bed, and photographs of women. He also found a hidden camera in a smoke alarm. He left the job immediately and phoned his lawyer who advised him not to continue. This event has not aired yet.

In May 2012 a hidden camera trial was aired revealing a carpet cleaner performing an indecent act in the actor's home. Within minutes of the occupant leaving the house, the tradesman was filmed sniffing various items of clothing in a laundry basket and later spraying perfume onto a pair of woman's underwear. He then turns on the household computer, visiting a pornography website, and begins masturbating into a pair of the actor's underwear. The tradesman performs this act at least twice during the segment. This particular episode focused around this one hidden camera trial with trials of other carpet cleaners not aired. Neither the company the carpet cleaner worked for was named, nor was the tradesman. The matter was referred to the New Zealand Police and the tradesman was charged with burglary and wilfully accessing a computer. The tradesman was fired from his job and granted name suppression.

=== Restaurant trials ===
Some trials have involved an actor visiting a restaurant or other food service place and while dining there taking a sample of the food purchased. The sample is sent to a lab for analysis. The standard of the service and any hygiene practices are also examined.

The 16 June 2009 edition of the consumer show featured a hidden camera segment assessing the hygiene standards of eight Auckland cafes, and claimed chicken from Cafe Cézanne contained high levels of faecal coliforms. TV3 released a statement on behalf of production company Top Shelf Productions admitting food samples from the cafes were incorrectly coded and they were unable to confirm which one had produced the contaminated food. Subsequently, the owners of Cafe Cézanne has started legal proceedings against Top Shelf Productions.

=== Service/repair trials ===
These trials were more common in the earlier seasons. A fault is created in an appliance, such as a TV set, microwave, or DVD player, and the item is then taken to repair outlets. When the appliance is returned to the actor, the presenters then check to see whether the appliance has actually been repaired and the standard of the repair, as well as the time taken to repair the appliance and the cost.

=== Other trials ===
The other trials have included taxis, LPG bottle fills, children's visits to Santa (2006 Christmas Special) and standards of services such as public toilets.

== Product check ==
Every week the Target test family test a chosen product. In this test about 5 brands of a particular product are tested by the family. The test is done by placing each brand on a colour-coded dish, with the family members unaware of what brand they are testing. Food items are usually taken to a lab to run other tests on the product as well. The test family are used for most product checks, but for some products a group of students or experts in a particular industry may be used. The test family changes every year and is typically a nuclear family with mostly teenage children. The first and most well-recognized test family were the Coombs, who were the test family for three years.

== Shame on you ==
Introduced in the 2007 series, Brooke follows up on personal stories by consumers that have been ripped off, poorly dealt with or misled about a certain product. Some stories are not hard luck stories, but just stories that cover wider issues and interviewing experts or affected parties. The dodgy operator is named.

== What's Up With That? ==
An occasional feature on the show. What's Up With That? looks at issues consumers may face. For example, one week a segment was covered on paying a fee for a cancelled appointment. Another example was retailers selling items marked as 'Not for Individual Sale' individually.

== Seconds Anyone ==
Part of the 2008 series, each week Jeanette looked at buying a particular item second hand. An expert told consumers what to look for, how much to expect to pay and which brands were the best to choose from.

== Things That Hack You Off ==
A segment in the 2006 series, it covered anything that most likely annoyed the consumer, from slow service or poor service to parking fines.

== Know Your Rights ==
This was regular segment in all of the earlier seasons from 1999 to 2003. A role play was done with two actors who would get into a different situation each week and would then ask what their rights were in this situation. The screen would then cut to David Russell from the Consumers Institute, who would explain what the consumer's rights were in this situation. The role play would continue, and as various points were raised, again David would explain the consumer's rights.

In the early seasons of Target, the show partnered with the Consumer's Institute, offering discounted Consumer magazine subscriptions.

== Controversies ==
=== Broadcasting standards breaches ===
In June 2008, Target was found to have breached broadcasting standards of privacy and fairness by covertly filming four caregivers in a private residence without their informed consent. The Broadcasting Standards Authority (BSA) upheld a complaint stating that the hidden camera footage—captured under deceptive circumstances and later broadcast—was an offensive intrusion into the caregivers' reasonable expectation of privacy and seclusion. The Authority ruled that there was insufficient public interest to justify the breach, particularly as some caregivers had performed competently. TVWorks, the broadcaster, was ordered to broadcast a statement summarising the decision. The ruling clarified that hidden camera footage in private settings must meet strict thresholds of consent or public interest to comply with broadcasting standards.

Also in June 2008, the BSA upheld another complaint against Target for breaching accuracy standards in an August 2007 segment about formaldehyde levels in imported clothing. The episode compared “total” formaldehyde test results (including bound formaldehyde) with international safety limits that apply only to “free” formaldehyde—an invalid comparison that significantly exaggerated the risks. The programme also claimed, without credible sourcing, that exposure to 20 parts per million could cause cancer. The Authority ruled that the item misled and unnecessarily alarmed viewers, and ordered TVWorks to broadcast a corrective statement and pay $4,000 to the Crown.

In May 2010, Target was found to have breached broadcasting standards following a June 2009 hidden camera investigation that falsely reported food contamination at Café Cézanne in Ponsonby, Auckland. The programme incorrectly stated that a chicken sandwich from the café tested positive for faecal coliforms, a serious health allegation. Despite being alerted to discrepancies before airing, the broadcaster, TVWorks, failed to verify the claim, and a subsequent on-air apology also inaccurately suggested the café could still have been the source. The BSA upheld complaints of inaccuracy and unfairness, ordered a public correction and apology across television, radio, and print, and imposed $28,068.75 in legal costs to the complainants and $10,000 in costs to the Crown.

== See also ==
- Fair Go
