= Dom Harvey =

New Zealand radio personality

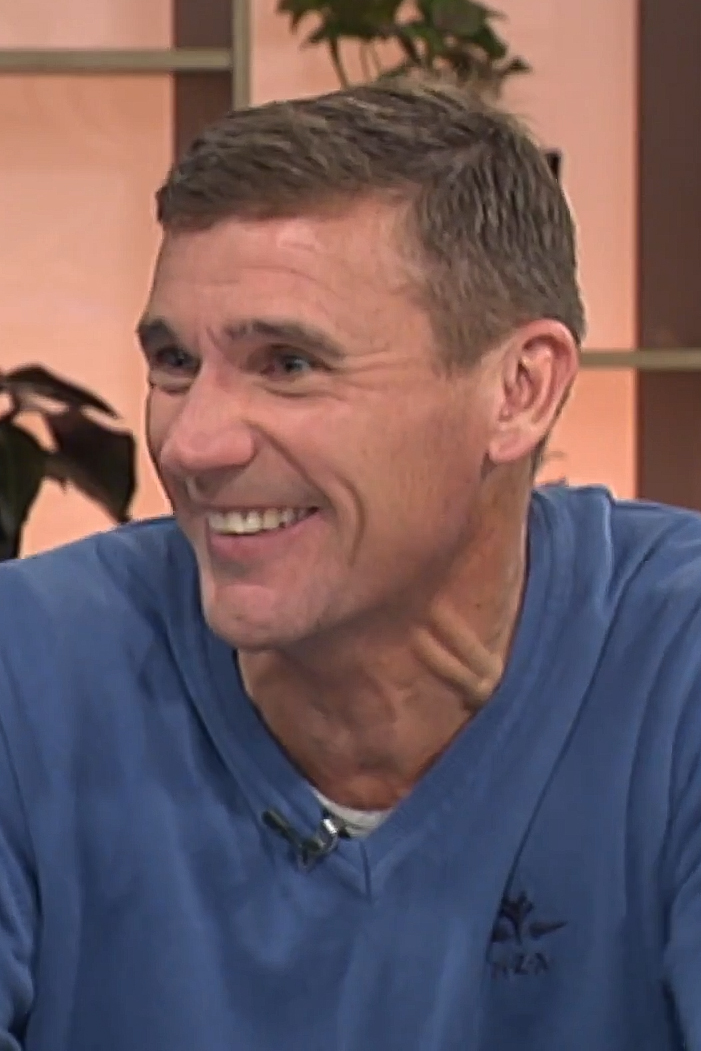
- Harvey in 2018
- Born: Dominic Mark Harvey; 3 February 1973 (age 53); Levin, New Zealand
- Spouse: Jay-Jay Feeney (m. 2004; sep. 2017)
- Partner: Ash Males (2022–present)
- Presenting career
- Station: The Edge (2001-2021)
- Network: MediaWorks New Zealand
- Country: New Zealand

YouTube information
- Channel: Dom Harvey
- Genre: Podcast
- Subscribers: 29.6 thousand
- Views: 16 million
- Last updated: August 12, 2026
- Website: https://www.dom.co.nz/

Dom Harvey (born 3 February 1973) is a New Zealand podcaster and former radio host. Known to be a 'shock jock', Harvey started his radio career on the morning breakfast show which aired on The Edge from 2001 until 2021.

After leaving The Edge, Harvey began his own podcast, The Dom Harvey Podcast. He founded a Podcast production company in Auckland called PodLab which he co-owns with his ex-wife Jay-Jay Feeney.

== Early life ==
Harvey was born in Levin, New Zealand. He later grew up in Palmerston North.

== Career ==
=== Radio ===
Harvey began his radio career with joining the now-defunct radio station 2XS FM. After this, Harvey joined the morning team on The Edge with co-hosts, Mike Puru and Jay-Jay Feeney.

On 30 July 2021, Harvey left The Edge due to exhaustion and mental health issues.

=== Podcast ===
Harvey started his own podcast, The Dom Harvey Podcast. Here he would talk with prominent New Zealanders. The podcast was originally titled Runners Only! but was later changed.

A highlighted episode of his podcast was of Tracy Hickman who was terminally ill and battling breast cancer. She shared her story with Harvey about her choice to end her life through the New Zealand euthanasia law. She died on 22 May 2024.

Harvey along with his ex-wife Jay-Jay Feeney established their own Podcast studio, PodLab in 2024.

In 2025 Harvey signed a global multi year deal with the podcast distribution platform Acast.

== Works ==
In 2012 Harvey published his first book Bucket List of an Idiot. This book was followed by Childhood of an Idiot which was released in 2014. In 2017 he released a book about his love for running in his book Running: A Love Story.

== Awards ==
Harvey is a recipient for the Sir Paul Holmes Award for NZ Broadcaster of the Year. In 2022 Harvey won bronze at the 2022 NZ Podcast Awards.

In 2024 Harvey was a finalist for his podcast at the 2024 NZ Radio & Podcast Awards, and The Dom Harvey Podcast won "Best Independent Podcast" at the 2024 NZ Radio & Podcast Awards. He also won Podcast of the Year at the 2024 NZ Podcast Awards, as well as God for Best Entertainment Podcast, Gold for Best Independent Podcast and Silver for best Interview Podcast.

== Personal life ==
Harvey was married to radio co-host Jay-Jay Feeney from 2004 until 2017. In 2018 Harvey said he had a new girlfriend but kept her name anonymous. In 2022 Harvey said he was in a new relationship with Wellington art student Ash Males.

Harvey has opened up about his mental health publicly on the radio. In January 2020 he shared publicly that he decided to seek therapy to address longstanding and unresolved trauma. Citing issues from the end of his marriage with fellow radio host Jay-Jay Feeney, his infertility and the stress of his career.

Harvey has completed several marathons around the world. Harvey was an ambassador for the World Masters Games in 2017 that was held in Auckland, New Zealand. In 2018 Harvey raised over $260,000 (NZD) that went to life-saving treatment for a girl with Neuroblastoma.

== Public controversies ==
During his years as a breakfast radio host on The Edge, Harvey was frequently described in the media as a "shock jock", reflecting the provocative and sometimes controversial style of humour associated with his on-air persona. Several incidents during this period attracted media attention and public criticism.

=== Jason Reeves text-message incident ===
In 2005, Harvey and his then-wife and co-host Jay-Jay Feeney were involved in a dispute with former colleague Jason Reeves after sending him a series of text messages while posing as an anonymous fan. The messages, which reportedly numbered up to 100 a day over a ten-day period, were described as largely innocuous. Reeves later reached a settlement with CanWest over the incident.

=== Alison Mau jingle ===
In 2010, Harvey was suspended without pay for 24 hours after an offensive jingle about broadcaster Alison Mau and her partner, Karleen Edmonds, was aired on The Edge. The recording was subsequently removed from the station's website and YouTube channel.

=== 2013 X Factor tweet ===
During the 2013 series of The X Factor New Zealand, Harvey was criticised for a tweet posted after contestant Grace Ikanasio was eliminated from the competition. The tweet referenced the New Zealand film Once Were Warriors and prompted complaints from members of the public. Harvey subsequently apologised.

=== Sophie Pascoe photograph incident ===
In 2013, Harvey inadvertently sent Paralympian Sophie Pascoe an intimate photograph that he said had been intended for a producer at The Edge who shared the same first name. His employer, MediaWorks, criticised the incident but took no further action. Pascoe publicly treated the mistake humorously, and Harvey later apologised.

=== 2015 Dancing With the Stars tweet ===
During the 2015 final of Dancing with the Stars New Zealand, Harvey posted a screenshot of contestant Chrystal Chenery accompanied by a caption that attracted criticism. He later apologised for the post.
