= Brunch (musical) =

BRUNCH The Musical
- Music: Anthony Funaro
- Lyrics: Rick Kunzi
- Book: Rick Kunzi; Adam Barnosky
- Productions: 2009 New York City Showcase; 2009 Off-Broadway

BRUNCH The Musical is a rock musical with music and lyrics by Rick Kunzi and a book by Kunzi and Adam Barnosky about the New York City restaurant scene.

Brunch was most recently performed Off-Broadway in New York City at the American Theater of Actors in 2009, and featured Meghann Dreyfuss (formerly in Mamma Mia! on Broadway), Kevin Collins, and Maxx Mann (former lead singer of the rock orchestra Trans-Siberian Orchestra).

== Synopsis ==
The story takes place behind the scenes at a hip New York restaurant for which this is the big meal of the week (there are 200 reservations). The characters consist of wait staff and bussers, a few patrons, a manager, a bartender, and a chef.

== Critical reception ==
Robert Windeler of Backstage magazine wrote, "You'd have to go to Broadway's Hair to find a more exuberant—not to mention more rock-oriented—current musical than this one." New Theater Corps described the show as, "A witty script filled with stinging one-liners and snappy comebacks. The rock and roll score starts off strong, fast, and loud, and keep it that way."
