= Josh Kronfeld =

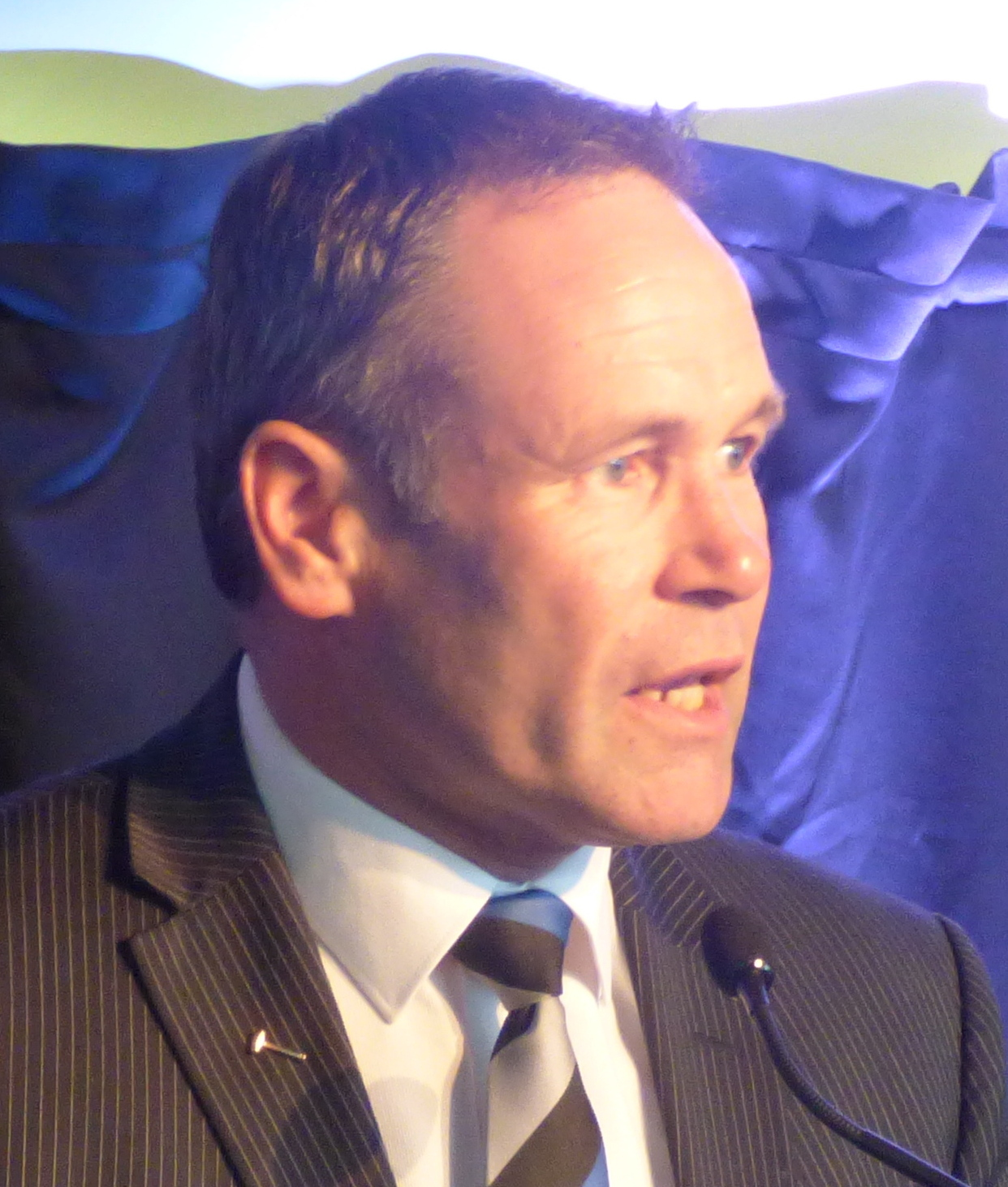
- Born: Joshua Adrian Kronfeld; 20 June 1971 (age 55) Hastings, New Zealand
- Height: 1.85 m (6 ft 1 in)
- Weight: 96 kg (15 st 2 lb)
- School: Hastings Boys High
- University: University of Otago
- Occupation: Physiotherapist

Rugby union career
- Position: Flanker
Senior career
| Years | Team | Apps | (Points) |
| 2001–03 | Leicester | 39 | (35) |
- Correct as of 12 December 2007
Provincial / State sides
| Years | Team | Apps | (Points) |
| 1993-2000 | Otago | 69 | ((-)) |
Super Rugby
| Years | Team | Apps | (Points) |
| 1996-2000 | Highlanders | 42 | ((-)) |
- Correct as of 12 December 2007
International career
| Years | Team | Apps | (Points) |
| 1995-2000 | New Zealand | 54 | (70) |
- Correct as of 12 December 2007

Joshua Adrian Kronfeld (born 20 June 1971) is a New Zealand former rugby union player. He played as an openside flanker for Otago, the Highlanders and Leicester. At international level, Kronfeld played in 56 games for the New Zealand national rugby union team (the All Blacks) earning 54 test caps, including appearances at the 1995 and 1999 Rugby World Cups.

Kronfeld is an alumnus of Aquinas College, Dunedin, and is a great-nephew of two All Blacks of the 1930s, brothers Dave and Frank Solomon.

== Early life ==
Kronfeld was born in Hastings in Hawkes Bay, and attended Hastings Boys' High School. Kronfeld described himself as "German-Samoan" and he is Jewish. He played his early rugby union at scrum-half and centre, switching to flanker at high school.

In 1990 Kronfeld moved to Dunedin to study physical education at the University of Otago, and became involved in the Otago University Rugby Club. After playing one game in 1992, Kronfeld gained a starting position in the Otago team in the National Provincial Championship (NPC) for 1993. Kronfeld eventually played 69 matches for Otago. He completed his BPhEd degree in 1993.

== Rugby career ==
Kronfeld made his test debut for New Zealand in 1995, playing against Canada at Eden Park in Auckland. He played in the 1995 Rugby World Cup including the final in which the All Blacks lost to South Africa.

After the inception of the Super 12 competition in 1996, Kronfeld also played for the Highlanders Super 12 franchise. In total, Kronfeld made 42 appearances for the Highlanders.

He made five appearances in the All Blacks’ 1999 World Cup campaign, which included the game against England and a semi-final with France that took place at Twickenham.

Kronfeld remained a first choice player for Otago, the Highlanders and the All Blacks until 2000. At the end of the 2000 season, after 69 matches for Otago, 42 for the Highlanders in the Super 12 and 56 All Black matches including 54 tests, Kronfeld left New Zealand rugby to take up a lucrative contract with the English club, Leicester. In May 2001 he officially signed with English club Leicester Tigers.

After an injury-hit start to the 2001-02 season Kronfeld recovered well, establishing himself as a regular first-team player. He was an unused replacement as Leicester won the 2002 Heineken Cup Final. He was twice voted by fans Player of the Month, once Zurich Premiership Player of the Month and then named by his Tigers colleagues as their Players' Player of the Season 2002-03.

In 2003, Kronfeld returned to New Zealand, and subsequently retired from first-class rugby.

== Life after rugby ==
Kronfeld has returned to the University of Otago to study physiotherapy.

He has made numerous media appearances, including on Celebrity Treasure Island.

In 2009, he participated in the fifth season of TVNZ's entertainment series Dancing with the Stars.

From September to December 2012, Kronfeld hosted Season One of the ChoiceTV show Brunch with April Ieremia.

== See also ==
- List of select Jewish rugby union players

Awards and achievements
| Preceded by Miriama Smith & Jonny Williams | Dancing with the Stars (New Zealand) third place contestant Season 5 (2009 with Rachel Burstein) | Succeeded by Show Axed |
