= The Café (New Zealand TV programme) =

New Zealand morning television show

- Title Card
- Genre: Morning television
- Presented by: Mel Homer; Carly Flynn
- Country of origin: New Zealand
- Original language: English
- No. of seasons: 5

Production
- Executive producers: Alex Breingan; Holly Pollock
- Producers: Jazz Heaven; Braydon Priest; Holly Pollock
- Running time: 60 minutes
- Production company: Toe Rag Productions

Original release
- Network: Three
- Release: 11 April 2016 – 31 December 2020

The Café is a New Zealand morning television lifestyle show that was first aired on 11 April 2016. The series finished at the end of 2020.

The program was hosted by Mel Homer and Carly Flynn, with Mike Puru co-hosting the show until May 2020.
