= Sally Ridge =

New Zealand interior and fashion designer

Sally Ridge is a New Zealand interior designer, television personality and socialite from Auckland. She is currently working as a real estate agent in Auckland city.

== Career ==
Ridge has been a television presenter on several shows dealing with interior decorating, including the TVNZ television series, Home Front and Changing Rooms. She was also one of the celebrities, on the 2001 New Zealand series of Celebrity Treasure Island. Along with Anita Simpson, she ran 24 Simpson Ridge, an interior design company. She formed clothing company James & August Ltd. in 2004. This failed, and went into liquidation in May 2010. The liquidation report filed with the Companies Office stated that the company owed $1 million.

Ridge has worked as a painter and fashion designer, having created some fashion items with Verge New Generation. In 2011, Ridge was writing a weekly crafts column for a woman's magazine, and making appearances at various events.

In May 2011, Ridge took part in a fashion show in Christchurch, also featuring model Nicky Watson, to raise money for the earthquake relief as part of the successful Rise Up Christchurch Telethon on Māori Television.

In September 2012, Ridge along with her eldest daughter Jaime, appeared in reality TV show The Ridges on TV3.

In February 2020, it was announced that Sally Ridge had split from Rich Lister Glenn Cotterill and is now focusing on her real estate career. She works for Bayleys Auckland central.

== Personal life ==
Ridge married former All Black and rugby league captain Matthew Ridge. Together they had two children, a daughter, Jaime Ridge, and son, Boston, before they broke up in 2001.

In 2003, Ridge started a relationship with ex-international cricketer Adam Parore.
