= Food Network (New Zealand) =

- Country: New Zealand

Programming
- Picture format: 16:9 576i SDTV

Ownership
- Owner: Discovery, Inc. (2014–2021); The Living Channel New Zealand Limited (2005–2014)
- Sister channels: Animal Planet; Bravo; Breeze TV; Choice TV; Discovery; Discovery Turbo; The Edge TV; HGTV; Living; Three; TLC

History
- Launched: 1 November 2005; 20 years ago
- Closed: 1 March 2021; 4 years ago
- Replaced by: Investigation Discovery
- Former names: Food TV (2005–2018)

Links
- Website: sky.co.nz/food-network

Food Network was a New Zealand pay television channel focused entirely on programming relating to food. It was based in Auckland and was New Zealand's only channel dedicated to the food, wine and restaurant society. The network never originated its own domestic content.

The channel was launched on Sky on 1 November 2005 as Food TV by The Living Channel New Zealand Limited.

The Living Channel New Zealand Limited, which owned Food TV as well as sister channel Living was acquired by Discovery, Inc. on 2 July 2014.

On 1 December 2018, Food TV was rebranded as a localised version of the American Food Network.

On 3 February 2021, Sky announced that Food Network would close in New Zealand and a selection of Food Network shows would be moved to its sister channel, Living. On 1 March 2021, the channel's schedule was replaced with a localised version of Investigation Discovery.

Food TV logo used from 2014 to 2018
