= Jay-Jay Feeney =

New Zealand radio host

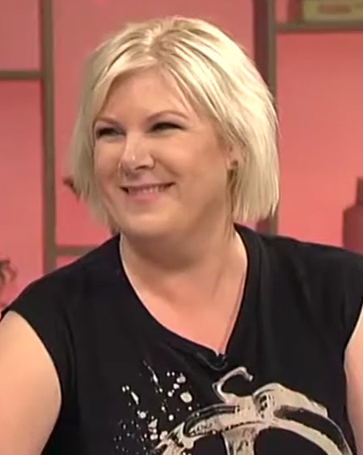
- Feeney in 2016
- Born: Jacqulyn-Joanne Barbara Feeney; 28 March 1974 (age 52)
- Occupation: Radio Host
- Spouse: Dominic Harvey (m. 2004; sep. 2017)
- Partner(s): Hoani Molnar (2021–2024); Minou (2024-present)

Jay-Jay Feeney (previously Jay-Jay Harvey; born 28 March 1974) is a New Zealand podcast co-host of How To Have Sex, media personality, podcast studio director and former radio host. She previously was a co-host for More FM's drive show, Jay-Jay & Flynny Driving You Home, with Paul Flynn. She has spent the majority of her career at The Edge, mostly on its breakfast show, until she left in December 2017. Feeney currently is a co-director for PodLab with Dom Harvey.

== Early life ==
Feeney was born Jacqulyn-Joanne Barbara Feeney on 28 March 1974, to Robynne Andersen. Her mother Robynne married Gary Feeney who later raised Feeney as his own daughter even though Robynne and Gary separated when Jay-Jay was four years old.

When Feeney was 37 years old she found her biological father on social media. Since meeting him, she has acquired five more half-siblings to then finding out that she has ten in total. She grew up in Hamilton and New Plymouth. She changed her name via Deed Poll in 2014 from Jacqulyn-Joanne to Jay-Jay.

== Career ==
=== Early career ===
Feeney began her radio career doing six weeks of work experience at Energy FM in New Plymouth at the age of 15. Over the next two years, she helped out with station promotions.

Feeney left school at the end of sixth form and studied towards a certificate in Media Studies at Taranaki Polytechnic, while continuing to work at Energy FM; she had her first on-air radio work in February 1991, when the usual 1 am – 7 am weekend host did not show up. She was later given the Monday-Friday midnight – 6 am shift, then a couple of weeks later, promoted to 7 pm – midnight.

=== Radio career ===
In 1994, she moved to The Breeze in Hamilton, where she hosted the drive show. She then left four months later, to host the drive show (2 pm – 7 pm) on the new station The Edge, where she started on air on 26 September 1994. In May 1995, she moved to host breakfast (6 am – 10 am) with Malcolm Paul, and drive (10 am – 2 pm) by herself.

In 2015, she appeared in the sixth series of Dancing with the Stars, where she placed fourth. In 2017, Feeney left The Edge after hosting for 23 years, with her last day on air being 22 December 2017.

In April 2018, she began on More FM, hosting the drive show, Jase & Jay-Jay Driving You Home, with Jason Gunn. Paul "Flynny" Flynn joined the show in May 2019, which became Jay-Jay, Flynny & Jase Driving You Home. Gunn subsequently left the show, and it is now known as Jay-Jay & Flynny Driving You Home.

In June 2024, Feeney announced that she would be leaving More FM. She hosted her final broadcast with the station on 5 July 2024.

=== PodLab & How To Have Sex Podcast ===
After leaving More FM, Feeney along with her ex-husband Dom Harvey established their own Podcast studio, PodLab. In 2026, Feeny began to co-host her first podcast with Sex & Relationship Coach Melissa Vranjes called How To Have Sex.

== Awards ==
Feeney won her first two radio awards, for Best Individual Air Personality, in 1995 and 1996. In 2012, the show won Best Morning Show at the New Zealand Radio Awards. In 2014, Feeney hosted the New Zealand Radio Awards and the show won Best Morning Show, The Sir Paul Holmes Broadcaster of the Year award, and the 'Blackie' award (named in honor of broadcaster Kevin Black). In 2018, she received a New Zealand Radio Award for Outstanding Contribution to Radio.

== Books ==
In 2013 she published an autobiographical book about her struggle with fertility, Misconception: A True Story of Life, Love and Infertility. In 2016 she published a memoir, Life on the Edge.

== Personal life ==
Feeney married co-host Dominic Harvey in 2004. They were legal guardians of a relative's child from 2007 to 2017.

She changed her name to Harvey in 2014 as a ten year anniversary gift to her husband Dominic Harvey, before changing it back to Feeney early 2018. In 2017, Feeney and Harvey announced their separation and she reverted to her surname of Feeney.

In 2017 Feeney was allegedly assaulted by a taxi driver. The case was highly publicised by New Zealand media. The driver was later found not guilty.

From 2021 until March 2024 Feeney was in a relationship with former army man Hoani Molnar. Feeney kept his identity private until revealing him through social media in 2022.

Feeney was previously in a long-distance relationship with Minou, an Algerian national who has been described in media reports as working in accounting and medical sales. The pair first connected online in 2018 and later met in person during overseas holidays, including trips to the Maldives and Malaysia. Their relationship ended in 2020 following international travel restrictions caused by the COVID-19 pandemic.

In December 2024, Jay-Jay Feeney confirmed in an interview with Woman's Day that she and Minou had reunited earlier that year after meeting again in Bali. She stated that the couple had resumed their relationship and were navigating the challenges of living in different countries. Feeney also disclosed that Minou had been granted a New Zealand visa in September 2025, although he later returned to Algeria temporarily in order to renew his passport.

=== Social media ===
Feeney regularly shares updates on her life on social media. She has also spoken openly about online bullying due to her highly publicised life through the New Zealand media.
