= Brunch (TV program) =

- Created by: Debra Kelleher
- Presented by: April Ieremia; Josh Kronfeld
- Country of origin: New Zealand
- No. of episodes: 65

Production
- Executive producer: Brian Holland
- Production location: Avalon studios
- Camera setup: Jane Vaughan; Trevor Rowe; Mike Varney
- Running time: 60 minutes

Original release
- Network: ChoiceTV
- Release: 24 September – 21 December 2012

Brunch is a New Zealand morning television program. It aired on Choice TV. It was hosted by April Ieremia and Josh Kronfeld, and was filmed in the Avalon Studios, in Wellington.

The program finished its first season on 21 December 2012; it was announced later on the Choice TV Facebook page by a viewer that the program was not getting renewed for a second season.

== Background ==
This show covered a lot of general audience and was targeted at an older generation. The show included home renovation, entertainment, music, and do-it-yourself segments.
