= Diana Mashkova =

Soviet writer (born 1977)

- Born: Diana Vladimirovna Mashkova; 29 November 1977 (age 48); Kazan, Republic of Tatarstan Russia
- Occupations: Writer and Journalist
- Years active: 2007 -Present
- Website: dmashkova.ru

Diana Vladimirovna Mashkova (Russian: Диана Владимировна Машкова; born 29 November 1977) is a Russian journalist, writer and author.

== Early life and education ==
Mashkova was born in Kazan. She was born in the family of a professor and engineer. Mashkova graduated from Kazan State Pedagogical University and was a postgraduate at Kazan State University where she learnt the English language and foreign literature. In 2002 Mashkova obtained her Ph.D. for foreign literature.

Mashkova moved to Moscow in 2002 where she worked as an interpreter with journalists from the Daily Telegraph. From 2002 until 2010 she was an employee for Transaero Airlines. There she worked as the Director for VIP clients.

== Career ==
In 2007 Mashkova released her first book. All of her books are published under the Eksmo publishing house in Russia.

== Personal life ==
Mashkova is married. She has three daughters and two sons, four of whom are adopted.
