= The GC =

- Genre: Reality Television Documentary
- Created by: Bailey Mackey
- Starring: Tylah Jones Wharehinga; Rosanna Arkle; Zane Houia; Elyse Minhinnick (DJ Tuini); Alby Waititi; Cole Smith; Nuz Ngatai; Matai Smith; Holly Subritzky; Matatia Brell; Braydon Mcmahon
- Narrated by: Tame Noema; Season 1-2; Tylah Jones Wharehinga; Season 3
- Opening theme: "Vibrations" by Jade Louise featuring Savage
- Country of origin: New Zealand
- Original languages: English, Maori
- No. of seasons: 3
- No. of episodes: 24

Production
- Executive producer: Bailey Mackey
- Production locations: Gold Coast, Australia
- Camera setup: Multi-camera
- Running time: 30 minutes (including commercials)
- Production company: Eyeworks Touchdown

Original release
- Network: TV3 (2012–14); Four (2015)
- Release: 2 May 2012 – 29 July 2015

The GC is a New Zealand reality television series that premiered on TV3 on 2 May 2012 in New Zealand. The series follows the lives of a group of Māori living in Gold Coast, Queensland.

The series has been compared to the American reality show The Hills.

== Production ==
The show was originally pitched as an observational documentary series called Golden Mozzies, described as "looking at seven Māori families living on Australia's Gold Coast". In August 2011, the producers of Golden Mozzies received $419,408 from broadcast funding agency NZ On Air for the production of eight 30 minute episodes. However, the format and title of the series was changed with NZ On Air's knowledge.

In 2013, a second season of The GC was funded by Maori broadcast funding agency Te Māngai Pāho with stricter requirements for Maori language and cultural content. $419,384 was granted for eight 30 minute episodes.

In 2015, it was announced via the shows Facebook page that the show was renewed for a third season, along with new cast members and the show being moved to Four.

The third season premiered in July 2015.

=== Theme tune ===
The opening theme tune for the series, a song called "Vibrations", was written by Xy Latu and performed by GC cast member Jade Louise Dewson-Hawera (known professionally as Jade Louise) featuring rapper Savage. The track was released as a single and reached number seven on the New Zealand Singles Chart in June 2012.

== Cast ==
The show revolves around Tylah Jones Wharehinga, Rosanna Arkle, Zane Houia, Elyse Minhinnick, Braydon McMahon, Holly Subritzky, Cole Smith, Alby Waititi, Nuz Ngatai, Matai Smith, and Matatia Brell. Former cast members include Tame Noema, Jade Louise, Jessie Nugent, Nathan Waikato, Brooke James, and Jade Ruwhiu.

=== Main ===
Name	Seasons		
Name	1	2	3
Elyse Minhinnick (DJ Tuini)	Main		
Rosanna "Rosie" Arckle	Main		
Zane Houia	Main		
Alby Waititi	Main		
Jade Louise Harawira	Main		Recurring
Tame Noema	Main		
Nathan Waikato	Main		
Brooke James	Main		
Jade Ruwhiu	Main		
Jessie Nugent	Main	Guest	
Cole Smith	Recurring	Main	
Ngahere "Nuz" Ngatai	Recurring		Main
Matai Smith		Guest	Main
Holly Subritzky			Main
Matatia			Main
Braydon			Main
Tylah			Main
Layla Subritzky			Recurring

== Critical reception ==
Following the screening of the pilot episode viewers branded the show as "fake" and "pathetic" and within hours a Facebook page called "Cancel the GC TV Show" was started. According to a New Zealand Herald article the Facebook page had over 2100 "likes" within 12 hours of the show's airing.

There have also been questions about the show's funding. Following the screening of the pilot episode it was revealed that NZ on Air gave NZ$419,408 to fund the first series of The GC. According to news website Scoop Independent News, NZ on Air thought they were funding a series about seven Māori families living on the Gold Coast of Australia with the working title Golden Mozzies. The same website published a press release from NZ on Air in August 2011 outlining that NZ on Air had approved funding for Golden Mozzies, which was then labeled as a documentary series.

== Episodes ==
=== Series 1 (2012) ===
No.	Title	Ratings	Time-shifted ratings	Original release date
1	"Episode 1"	370,660	17,490	2 May 2012
Tame throws a housewarming party with his flatmates Jade and Zane, their girlfriends Jessi and Rose, and friends Nate, Nuz, Alby, DJ Tuini and Jade Louise.
2	"Episode 2"	289,480	24,030	9 May 2012
Tame faces the morning after the party; Jessi attends her first glamour model shoot; Alby reveals a shocking revelation.
3	"Episode 3"	297,920	7110	16 May 2012
Tame confesses all; Jade Louise considers her singing career; the whare boys look are more investment opportunities; Rosie take Alby to a photo shoot; and the boys check out Cole's new gym.
4	"Episode 4"	245,620	—	23 May 2012
Nate auditions; Cole's father helps out with the gym; Tame and Jade Louise are pushed to take things further; Jade Louise has a confession for Tame.
5	"Episode 5"	294,670	9810	30 May 2012
The girls crash the boys night out; Cole's gym opening is close; Jade Louise and Nuz put on a show; Rosie is jealous of Zane; DJ Tuini discovers a family secret.
6	"Episode 6"	254,970	21,940	6 June 2012
DJ Tuini considers a return to New Zealand, Zane tries to make peace with Rosie, Jessi is jealous of Jade; Cole wants to get back in the ring.
7	"Episode 7"	325,860	20,480	13 June 2012
DJ Tuini returns to her marae; Cole's gym opening is running behind schedule; the boys make it to haka practise; Jade and Jessi's have relationship troubles.
8	"Episode 8"	318,860	20,960	20 June 2012
Cole's whanau arrive from New Zealand; Jade Louise records her first single; Nate takes driving lessons; Tame has a surprise.
