= Living (New Zealand TV station) =

New Zealand television station

- Country: New Zealand

Programming
- Picture format: 1080i (HDTV) 16:9

Ownership
- Owner: The Living Channel New Zealand Limited (2001–14); Discovery, Inc. (2014–22); Warner Bros. Discovery (2022–present)
- Sister channels: Animal Planet; Bravo; Discovery; Discovery Turbo; Eden; HGTV; ID; Rush; Three; TLC

History
- Launched: 2001; 24 years ago
- Former names: The Living Channel (2001–2010); Living Channel (2015–2019)

Links
- Website: Living Channel

Living is a New Zealand television station. The channel focuses entirely on programming relating to lifestyle and is similar to The LifeStyle Channel in Australia or HGTV in the US. It broadcasts on Sky in New Zealand and features local programming as well as a range of international programming. It features programming in areas such as design, health, well-being, travel, pets, fashion, automotive, antiques, gardening, fitness, art, homemaking and food. Programmes include Antiques Roadshow UK, Jon and Kate Plus 8, Greatest Cities of the World with Griff Rhys Jones, Grand Designs, Homes Under the Hammer, Better Homes and Gardens, Holmes Inspection, Extreme Fishing with Robson Green, Location, Location, Location, What Not to Wear, and The Secret Millionaire.

The channel was launched on Sky Network Television in 2001 by The Living Channel New Zealand Limited.

The Living Channel New Zealand Limited, which owned Living as well as sister channel Food TV was acquired by Discovery, Inc. on July 2, 2014. Food TV was rebranded as Food Network in 2018.

On 1 March 2021, Living's sister channel Food Network closed and a selection of Food Network shows were moved to Living.

Original The Living Channel logo
