= Regional television in New Zealand =

In New Zealand, regional television refers to television stations, which in the analogue age broadcast on the UHF band, that had local programming, as well as specialist programming. As of October 2026, there are three such stations still on air: Apna Television, Wairarapa TV and Television Hawke's Bay. Invercargill's Cue TV was broadcast nationwide on the Sky platform from 2003 until its closure in 2015. Most stations have shut down over time, often due to a lack of funds.

== History ==
=== Background ===
When the New Zealand Broadcasting Service (renamed New Zealand Broadcasting Corporation in 1962) started broadcasting its television service in 1960, there was no uniform national network. There were four stations which provided television programmes initially to the city of licence, before expanding its coverage to include adjacent areas. The stations were:

- AKTV2 (Auckland, 1 June 1960)
- CHTV3 (Christchurch, June 1961)
- WNTV1 (Wellington, July 1961)
- DNTV2 (Dunedin, 31 July 1962)

After the TEV Wahine disaster on 9 April 1968, NZBC announced the creation of a national microwave relay network to connect the four centres; the network was completed on 25 October 1969 and the first broadcasts started on 3 November 1969 with the first edition of the NZBC Network News produced by WNTV1 in Wellington. Gradually, over time, the original four-region model for television broadcasts was replaced by a centralised system. Initially it was semi-centralised: on 17 July 1976, viewers in most of the South Island were deprived from seeing TV One's coverage of the opening ceremony of the 1976 Summer Olympics when the Blue Duck transmitter in Kaikōura lost its generator due to heavy wind and gales. On 31 March 1980, weeks after the two television channels (Television One and TV2) merged to form the current TVNZ, regional news programmes were restored. These aired at 7.30pm and ran for half an hour. The regional programmes broadcast from the four main TVNZ studios, the ones that operated as independent TV stations in the 1960s: in Auckland (Top Half), Wellington (Today Tonight), Christchurch (The Mainland Touch) and Dunedin (7.30 South). In 1982, the regional programmes were incorporated into the network news bulletin with 7.30 South rebranded as The South Tonight. Each region would break out from the network news for a 20-minute regional programme before returning to the network news for the weather. In 1989 the regional programmes were transferred to Network Two in the new timeslot of 5.45pm, and Top Half and Today Tonight were axed later that year. In 1990, The Mainland Touch and The South Tonight were transferred back to Television One and screened immediately after the Māori news programme Te Karere (live at 5.20pm in the North Island, delayed at 5.35pm in the South Island) and before the network news. Both programmes were axed altogether at the end of 1990.

=== Commercial television ===
The newspaper industry was also keen on obtaining licences for private television stations, the likes of which only came into fruition in 1989. On 11 December 1980, publishing company Wilson and Horton won a bid for a third television channel; this was one of the three regional television licenses granted to the newspaper industry, the other two being the Central Television Network and one for the South Island. Technical training from Australia was brought in to study transmission and frequency issues to enable its broadcasts. Northern Television ultimately broadcast nationwide on TV One's frequencies with Good Morning New Zealand, making it the first television programme on TVNZ to be produced by an independent company. It aired for the first time on 21 June 1982 but, over time, it was renamed 11AM and had its closure set for 17 June 1983. In September 1983, it even announced plans to broadcast on the UHF band and in stereo.

The bid for a third channel was revived in 1985. Like what was intended for Northern Television, the bids were regionalised. The North Island received three bids instead of two and the South Island still received one. These were:

- Region 1 serving Auckland and Northland
- Region 2 serving Waikato, Bay of Plenty and Hawke's Bay
- Region 3 serving Wellington, Manawatu and Taranaki
- Region 4 serving the South Island

Applicants for the warrants included Aotearoa Broadcasting System, Civic Enterprises (region 4 only), Energy Source Television Network, Impact Television, On-Shore Services (region 1 only), Southern Cross Television (except region 2), Tele-Vid Three group and United Telecast Corporation (region 2 only). Hearings began in August 1985. The Broadcasting Tribunal announced in August 1987 that the Tele-Vid Three group (TV3) had been awarded all four warrants. The four channels would be based in Auckland, Tauranga, Wellington and Christchurch, with a jointly owned national news and current affairs service and a national advertising service. TV3 was proposed to launch in early 1989, with broadcasts initially covering 80% of the population. However, TV3 was affected by the share market crash in October 1987, rationalising the plans for four regional services before being shelved completely. The network was to be based in Auckland with limited studios and news and sales teams in the other main centres.

=== UHF ===
UHF broadcasts in the early half of the 1990s, coupled by the deregulation of the media landscape, facilitated the creation of new local television stations. These were either general services catering local communities, as well as specialist ethnic and music channels. One of the earliest stations was Canterbury Television in Christchurch, which broadcast from facilities that TVNZ used there in the past. It started on 17 June 1991.

TVNZ launched the Horizon Pacific Television network to counter its national networks lacking regional programming. There was an excess in the amount of UK and US-made programmes (including the relays of BBC World) which meant that the service was considered to be an "oxymoron" countering its plan to be "regional public service television". There were four stations in the network:

- ATV (Auckland)
- Coast to Coast (Hamilton)
- Capital City Television (Wellington)
- Southern Television (Dunedin)

The privately-owned Canterbury Television joined the network in November 1995, when Horizon Pacific acquired it. Four of the five stations (all but Southern) aired the first LGBT-centric programme on New Zealand television, Express Report, which became famous for being rejected by Southern Television owing to ratings and advertising concerns. It was subsequently renamed Out There and ended in April 1997.

Horizon Pacific operated at a loss throughout its existence, the initial 7pm news hour was replaced by a 5.30pm bulletin and was scrapped later on, in order to enable One News relays on the network. Local news services were restored in February 1997, but TVNZ announced plans to shut it down as it was unsustainable, replacing it by MTV Europe, a more competitive alternative, in June.

Music channels also sprung on the UHF band. Auckland had Max TV and Christchurch had Cry TV. In 1996, Te Māngai Pāho saw a need for a trial television station in the Māori language, the Aotearoa Television Network, which broadcast from a low-powered transmitter in the Auckland area. It failed a number of funding issues, as well as a notorious scandal in which Tuku Morgan, one of the partners of the project, was involved in using $89 out of ATN's $4,000 budget for buying a pair of Hugo Boss underpants at Politiks in Newmarket, as well as other misuse of funds. ATN's director Morehu McDonald also spent his budget buying clothes there. These actions prompted an audit. By April 1997, ATN was renting airtime to Patrick McPhee, and planned negotiations with Taiwanese, Indian and Chinese groups for ethnic programming. ATN shut down in July and liquidated two months later. At the end of 1996, licences were given to trusts in Auckland, Chirstchurch and Dunedin.

Religious groups were also interested in such licences. This led to the creation of the Family Television Network in 1996: first in Auckland, on terrestrial and cable, then in 1997 it had spread to Christchurch, using Cry TV's frequency, but Cry TV was blocked as a formal sale wasn't approved yet. FTN in Canterbury moved to CTV's frequency in October 1997, after Horizon Pacific shut down, leaving CTV off air for months. For much of 1998, it also owned half of Mercury Television's operating company CRT, later leaving the South Island in 2000 by selling its Canterbury station.

As of November 1997, the following stations were in operation:

- Auckland: Music channel Max TV, community channel Family Television Network, community channel Triangle TV (due early 1998)
- Hamilton: Music channel Static TV (suspended at the time)
- Gisborne: Music channel Eastland Television
- Palmerston North: Music channel Dog TV
- Wellington: Community station Channel 7 (due by March 1998)
- Nelson: Community stations Mainland Local, Mainland Network and Bays TV
- Christchurch: Community stations CHTV and CTV. Dunedin: Music station Channel 9
- Invercargill: Community station Mercury Television

=== Later years and downfall ===
Southland TV became a national channel in 2003 when it started broadcasting on the Sky platform. The stations also used the new Freeview platform. From 19 April 2011, Canterbury Television, whose building was damaged in an earthquake two months earlier, made its programmes available nationwide on Māori Television, which aired the previous day's offering. World TV, owner of Japanese, Chinese and Korean services on the Sky platform, launched an English-language channel, TV9, on 1 February 2012, mostly relaying CCTV News programming.

However, the 2010s led to a rapid decrease in the amount of regional television stations. Cue TV shut down in 2015, its operating company downsized to a mere production company. In December 2023, Channel 39 announced its plans to shut down, due to declining funding from NZ On Air.

== List of stations ==
=== Current ===
Name	Owner	Launched	Coverage	Format
Apna Television	Apna Networks	2014	Auckland	Ethnic (Hindi)
Television Hawke's Bay	Sawyer Television Ltd	1994	Napier	General
Wairarapa TV	Wairarapa TV	24 October 2016	Auckland	General

=== Former ===
Name	Owner	Launched	Closed	Coverage	Format
Channel North Television	Channel North Television	1 August 2008	31 August 2017	Whangārei	General
Auckland Television	Horizon Pacific Television (TVNZ)	19 March 1995	30 June 1997	Auckland	General
Max TV	Horizon Pacific Television (TVNZ)	28 October 1993	3 December 1997	Auckland	Music
Aotearoa Television	Aotearoa Television Network	1 May 1996	July 1997	Auckland	Māori
Coast to Coast	Horizon Pacific Television (TVNZ)	19 March 1995	30 June 1997	Hamilton	General
Capital City Television	Horizon Pacific Television (TVNZ)	19 March 1995	30 June 1997	Wellington	General
Wellington Television	Wellington Television	2000	14 November 2002	Wellington	General
Canterbury Television	Star Media	17 June 1991	19 December 2016	Christchurch	General
Cry TV	Cry TV	1993	1997	Christchurch	Music
Visitor Television	Star Media	September 2005	February 2011	Christchurch	Tourism
45 South Television	45 South Television	September 2006	December 2024	Oamaru	General
Southern Television	Horizon Pacific Television (TVNZ)	19 March 1995	30 June 1997	Dunedin	General
Cue TV	Cue TV	31 October 1996	10 April 2015	Invercargill	General
