= MTV (New Zealand) =

- Final logo used from 1 July 2009 to 30 November 2010
- Country: New Zealand
- Headquarters: Auckland

Programming
- Language: English
- Picture format: 576i (SDTV)

Ownership
- Owner: MTV Networks Australia & New Zealand

History
- Launched: 18 August 2006
- Closed: 30 November 2010
- Replaced by: MTV Australia

Links
- Website: www.mtv.co.nz

MTV New Zealand was a 24-hour general television entertainment channel operated by MTV Networks International. The channel launched on 18 August 2006. From its launch MTV New Zealand employed 23 people at its headquarters in Auckland. MTV New Zealand was replaced with MTV Australia on 30 November 2010 while still retaining localised advertising and website for New Zealand. As of November 2011, MTV.co.nz redirects viewers to MTV.com.au.

== History ==
Between June 1997 to June 1998, MTV was operated in New Zealand as a free-to-air channel by TVNZ using content from UK version of MTV, using the frequency network formerly used by the loss-making Horizon Pacific Television network of regional stations. It controversially replaced Auckland's free-to-air music TV channel Max TV and Christchurch's Cry TV, and was only broadcast in Auckland, Wellington, Tauranga, Hamilton, Christchurch and Dunedin.

On 18 May 2006 SKY Network Television announced the launch of a licensed, localised MTV channel, operated by Viacom New Zealand.

The announcement of the channel triggered discussion among the public and in online forums. The channel had the backing of several influential New Zealanders in the music industry including: Ed St. John, President and CEO, Warner Music Australasia; Denis Handlin, Chairman & CEO, Sony BMG Music Entertainment Australia & New Zealand; Andy Murnane, CEO, Dawn Raid Entertainment; and local hip-hop artist Savage.

It commenced full operations on 16 August 2006. Chris Keely oversaw its operations and believed that the need for a New Zealand feed of the channel owed to its rising population, the "booming" nature of the country's broadcast market and the increase in demand for local music.

In 2007 MTV Australia announced its nominees for the MTV Australia Video Music Awards 2007. Along with the usual categories came the New Zealand viewers choice award which was a special category for New Zealand artists. The winner (which was announced on the night) was Goodnight Nurse. In celebration of this MTV New Zealand (along with Air New Zealand) hosted the world's first MTV Mile High Gig which made its way from New Zealand to the MTV Australia Video Music Awards and had live bands, Goodnight Nurse and Dukes, on the plane.

MTV aired MTV Snow Jam to celebrate their first birthday, featuring acts such as Lupe Fiasco, Savage, Mareko and The Mint Chicks, on 18 August 2007 at Snow Park in Wānaka. The show was in conjunction with the finals of the Billabong Slopestyle Jam competition.

In October 2008, MTV Networks ANZ managing director Dave Sibley refused a comment from The New Zealand Herald reporter John Drinnan regarding the possibility of local content.

=== Website ===
The website officially launched in July 2006 and only showed a promo for the channel (which related to cows and cow milk which makes people do strange things), a form to win tickets to the 2006 VMAs, VJ search and launch party info. The full site launched with the channel on 18 August 2006 and included a home page with MTV New Zealand promos, news, features, competitions, interactive forums, a page on MTV Full Tank and more. A redesigned website was launched on Monday, 29 May 2007. This redesign mirrored the then-recently launched MTV Australia website and utilised a different key colour to differentiate it. This was the website design that was used until the channel's shutdown.

=== Closure of New Zealand office ===
It was confirmed on 28 September 2010 that MTV Networks International would close its offices in Auckland and relocate MTV New Zealand to MTV Networks Australia & New Zealand's offices in Sydney, Australia. This came into effect as of 30 November 2010, alongside the channel's closure.

== Programming and schedule ==
MTV New Zealand broadcast flagship MTV programs including Punk'd, Pimp My Ride, Laguna Beach and The Hills.

Local MTV programs included Full Tank hosted by Amber Peebles and Jay Reeve, and 100% Pure NZ, a local music show dedicated to NZ music releases.

MTV also broadcast a Top 10 Countdown nightly, although the genre of songs played changed from one day to the next.

On 6 July 2007 MTV launched The Mix which was hosted by Amber Peebles and Jay Reeve.

Despite MTV marketing itself as 'Music Television', there were only 3–4 music shows shown on MTV within each 24-hour day. Most of the programming was MTV created content that has little to do with music (Pimp My Ride, Laguna Beach, Full Tank, The Hills, etc.), however music videos were often shown between shows.

=== Programming blocks ===
MTV (New Zealand) showed a variety of specialty programming blocks. This is a somewhat exhaustive list:

- Dumb-ass Tuesday - Comedy shows like Punk'd, Jackass, Wildboyz, and Dirty Sanchez, some shows could be seen in groups of 2 episodes. It ran from 8pm to midnight on Tuesdays.
- Nu-shite (sometimes bowdlerized to Nu-sh*te) - If you missed something new during the week or want to see it again, this is where you would go. It ran from 4pm to 8pm on Saturdays.
- The 10-spot - Different shows aired at 10pm every weeknight.
- Monday Night's a B*tch (seen as Monday Night's a Bitch on the channel) - Shows like Laguna Beach, My Super Sweet 16, and The Hills could be seen here. It ran from 8pm to midnight on Mondays.
- Lowrider Thursday - Car shows like Pimp My Ride, Road Rules, and Trick It Out dominate. It ran from 8pm to midnight on Thursdays.
- Larry & Spud Sunday Roast - Programs strategically placed for easy viewing. It ran from 8pm to midnight on Sunday nights.
- Wacked Out Wednesdays - Programs such as Room 401, Fist of Zen, and Scarred are broadcast during this programming block on Wednesdays.
- Slip Slop Slapper Sundays - Programs repeated twice running from 6pm-11pm. Shows such as Maui Fever, The Hills, Living Lahaina and A Shot at Love with Tila Tequila were aired.
- Sweatin' Beats - Music videos played from 3am-5am for partiers. Usually techno or dance songs were played.

A themed marathon ran every weekend, from 10am-3pm on Saturday and 1pm-8pm on Sunday. The theme changed every week.

=== Former VJs ===
- Amber Peebles
- Jay Reeve
- Sam Kelway

== MTV Networks New Zealand ==
MTV Networks New Zealand consisted of:

- MTV (New Zealand)
- Nickelodeon (New Zealand)
- Comedy Central (Australia & New Zealand)

== See also ==
- Nickelodeon (New Zealand)
- Recipients of the MTV AVMA's New Zealand Choice Award
