= List of programs broadcast by MTV Australia =

This is a list of programmes that have been shown on MTV Australia.

== 0–9 ==
- 8th and Ocean

== A ==
- The Adventures of Chico and Guapo
- After Hours
- America's Best Dance Crew
- America's Most Smartest Model
- The Andy Dick Show
- The Andy Milonakis Show
- The Assistant

== B ==
- Bad Girls Club
- Barrio 19
- Battle for Ozzfest
- Beavis and Butt-Head
- Becoming
- The Big 12
- Billabong Pro Jeffreys Bay
- The Blame Game
- Blowin' Up
- Boiling Points
- Bromance
- Burned

== C ==
- Call to Greatness
- Camp Jim
- Celebrity Deathmatch
- Charm School
- The City

== D ==
- Daddy's Girls
- DanceLife
- Daria
- Date My Mom
- Degrassi: The Next Generation
- Dirty Sanchez
- Dismissed
- Dogg After Dark
- Doggy Fizzle Televizzle
- A Double Shot at Love
- Dr. Steve-O

== E ==
- Engaged and Underage
- Exiled

== F ==
- Fast Inc.
- Final Fu
- Fist of Zen
- Fraternity Life
- From G's to Gents

== G ==
- Go and Get Rock'd!
- Gotti's Way

== H ==
- Headbangers Ball
- High School Stories
- The Hills
- Hip Hop Candy
- Hip Hop Countdown
- Hogan Knows Best
- Homewrecker

== I ==
- I Bet You Will
- I Love Money
- I Want to Work for Diddy
- I'm from Rolling Stone

== J ==
- Jackass

== L ==
- Laguna Beach: The Real Orange County
- Legally Blonde: The Musical: The Search for Elle Woods
- Life of Ryan
- Liquid Television
- Little Talent Show
- Live Earth
- Living Lahaina

== M ==
- Made
- Making the Band
- Making the Video
- Maui Fever
- Meet the Barkers
- Meet or Delete
- Miss Seventeen
- Motolalert – Artist of the Month
- MTV and Billabong Presents...
- MTV Cribs
- MTV Duets
- MTV Full Tank
- MTV Goal
- MTV Hits
- MTV Live
- MTV Screen
- MTV World Stage
- MTV's The 70s House
- MTV's The Lair
- MTV's Official Motorola ARIA Chart Show
- My Block
- My Own
- My Pix
- My Super Sweet 16

== N ==
- Newlyweds: Nick and Jessica
- Newport Harbor: The Real Orange County
- Next
- Nick Cannon's Wild 'n Out
- Nitro Circus

== O ==
- The Osbournes

== P ==
- Pageant Place
- Parental Control
- Paris Hilton's My New BFF
- Pimp My Ride
- Pimp My Ride International
- Pimp My Ride UK
- Popalicious
- PoweR Girls
- Punk'd

== Q ==
- QT

== R ==
- The Real World
- Real World/Road Rules Challenge
- Rich Girls
- Road Rules
- Rob and Big
- Rock of Love with Bret Michaels
- Room Raiders

== S ==
- Scarred
- Scream Queens
- Senseless
- A Shot at Love with Tila Tequila
- The Sifl and Olly Show
- Singled Out
- Sorority Life
- SpongeBob's Truth or Square
- Spy Groove
- Stankervision
- Suckers

== T ==
- Taildaters
- Taking the Stage
- That's Amoré!
- There and Back
- Tiara Girls
- The Tom Green Show
- Tool Academy
- Total Request Live
- Totally Jodie Marsh
- Trick It Out
- The Trip
- Trippin'
- True Life

== V ==
- The Veronicas: Blood Is for Life
- Verushka's Closet
- The Virgin Diaries
- Viva La Bam
- VMA Favourite Performances
- VMAs Uncensored
- Vodafone Live at the Chapel

== W ==
- The Wade Robson Project
- Wake Up
- Where My Dogs At?
- Why Can't I Be You?
- Wild 'n Out
- Wildboyz
- Wonder Showzen

== X ==
- The X Effect

== Y ==
- Yo Momma

== Current ==
Since the formation of MTV Networks Australia in 2005 more original programming has emerged from the channel.

=== MTV's Official Motorola ARIA Chart Show ===
Through a partnership with ARIA MTV began broadcasting MTV's Official Motorola ARIA Chart Show which shows the current top 20 chart, music news, interviews and reviews.

=== MTV's The Lair ===
MTV's The Lair made its premiere on 26 January 2007, and is aired live every Thursday at the Metro Theatre in Sydney. The show features established and un-signed Australian and international bands.

=== MTV Screen ===
Features previews and reviews of the latest movie and DVD releases.

=== Music blocks ===
Features non-stop music between MTV's reality TV schedule including:

- After Hours
- Hits
- Popalicious
- Wake Up

=== Music video countdowns ===
Features music video countdowns including:

- Hip-Hop Countdown
- The Big 12

=== Vodafone Live at the Chapel ===
Live intimate shows featuring Australian and international artists.

==== Surf programming ====
During Spring 2005 MTV Australia featured a range of surf related programming that had been produced the previous summer. The shows had commercial ties with the Billabong surf brand. Included in the lineup was Surf Shorts, a show featuring participants in the Jack McCoy Surf Film Festival, and Girls Get Out There, an edutainment program on female surfers.

== Defunct ==
=== MTV Most Wanted ===
This was MTV Australia's flagship request show, started in 1996 and adopted from the formula used on MTV Asia. In subsequent years the show also used the same visuals as the Asian version. It was originally hosted by Yvette Duncan, the only VJ on the station at the time. Most Wanted ran weekdays for around two hours each day and was hosted from either a studio set or live location such as music stores. The show was replaced with TRL Australia in 2005.

=== TRL Australia ===
Shortly after the UK and Ireland version of MTV developed its own version of the American TRL, plans began for an Australian TRL. At first the show was weekly, broadcasting live on Fridays and running alongside MTV Most Wanted. TRL Australia uses the same logo as TRL UK. Shows were produced on a large cruise yacht, dubbed the "MTV Cruiser", which floated around Sydney Harbour, containing the audience, performing bands and VJs. Australian band Killing Heidi were the first to perform on the show.

Later TRL Australia became a daily show, with the Monday – Thursday slots being broadcast from a small boxed set at Global Television Studios in Sydney. Shows from the MTV Cruiser are produced on Fridays and are titled TRL Weekend. Both the weekly and weekend editions of TRL Australia feature prominent local and overseas celebrities, often during tours of Australia. They closely follow the formula of the original TRL.

During 2006 production on TRL Australia ceased without any announcement and as of May 2007 has not recommenced. It was replaced on-air with Full Tank and The Lair.

=== Quality Time ===
Shown in 2005, featuring local VJs spending time with a musical celebrity. The show uses a "day in the life of" format, including candid interviews and footage. Most of the shows feature the VJ in the United States.

==== Full Tank ====
The Full Tank crew hits the roads of Australia in search of the exciting, the kinky, the glamorous and the downright weird. They are discovering all the festivals, concerts, events, comps and parties that makes Australia unique.

==== MTV Mobbed ====
Be prepared to get Mobbed on air, online and on mobile with the hottest downloads downunder!

==== Other shows ====
Some shows are collaborated by MTV Australia, such as The Rock Chart and Scrambled Megs. These shows are not hosted by MTV VJs. Occasionally MTV Australia produces special shows such as VJ Hunts and summer surf specials. In the past MTV Australia has also been involved in novel original programming such as Digital Lili, a live phone-in show featuring a computer generated host. The show aired in Australia and Asia.
