= List of free-to-air channels in New Zealand =

This article is a list of free-to-air channels in New Zealand.

== New Zealand broadcast channels ==
Notes

- The PAL-B&G (analogue) television switch off was completed on 1 December 2013. AM and FM radio is unaffected.
- DVB 64-QAM terrestrial channels use ITU system G channel allocations within UHF television band IV and band V. On 1 December 2013, Band V above 698 MHz was reallocated to LTE mobile telephony, hence some channels that were broadcasting on Band V above 698 MHz on 30 November 2013 have been forced off air until a new frequency is allocated.
- All digital terrestrial television channels are encoded in H.264 and subject to a MPEG-LA controlled transmission patent licensing tax which is in included in the Freeview broadcaster cost and varies on viewership figures.
- High-definition 1080i DVB 64-QAM are only available on TVNZ 1, TVNZ 2, Three, Whakaata Māori, TVNZ Duke, Sky Open, Trackside 1 & 2. All other TV channels are standard-definition 576i anamorphic widescreen.
- Metro means Kordia owned sites only in Auckland, Hamilton, Tauranga, Napier/Hastings, Palmerston North, the Wellington metropolitan area (including Kapiti), Christchurch and Dunedin.
- A grey box in the 64-QAM column means the channel(s) is temporarily off-air.
- All New Zealand operated direct-broadcast satellite channels are from Optus D1 at 160.0°E, and can be received via a standard 60 cm parabolic antenna. There are two main up-links - the original one from Sky in Auckland, on transports 3 @ 12519 MHz, 5 @ 12644 MHz or 6 @ 12671 MHz and the one from TVNZ's Avalon comm hub in Lower Hutt, with channels broadcast on either Freeview transport 21 @ 12456 MHz or 22 @ 12483 MHz.
- IPTV resolution is generally better than 576i due to not being scaled to an anamorphic widescreen width of 720, but may be lower depending on the bandwidth selected or calculated at the time of connection. Playback performance may vary with network traffic conditions. Most metropolitan New Zealanders have access to fibre broadband.

Freeview high viewership nationwide channels
Channel number		DVB name(s)	Owner/parent company	Launch	H.222 Transport	Availability			
Channel number		DVB name(s)	Owner/parent company	Launch	H.222 Transport	Terrestrial	Satellite DVB		IPTV
Freeview	Sky	DVB name(s)	Owner/parent company	Launch	H.222 Transport	DVB 64-QAM	Freeview	Sky	IPTV
1		TVNZ 1	TVNZ (govt.)	1 June 1960	TVNZ	1080i	1080i	1080i	Live stream and on-demand
New Zealand's first television channel. Started as four stations (AKTV2, WNTV1, CHTV3, DNTV2); amalgamated into one channel (NZBC TV) in October 1973. Renamed TV One on 1 April 1975.
2		TVNZ 2	TVNZ (govt.)	1 June 1975	TVNZ	1080i	1080i	1080i	Live stream and on-demand
Youth focused channel, named South Pacific Television from 1976 to 1980.
3		Three	Sky Free	26 November 1989	Sky Free	1080i	1080i	1080i	Live stream and on-demand
Started off as NZ's first private TV network, sold off to Canadian, Australian and American interests. Currently owned by Sky Network Television.
4	12	Bravo	NBCUniversal International Networks	3 July 2016	Sky Free	576i	576i	576i	Live stream and on-demand
Lifestyle and reality television channel. Originally launched as a youth entertainment channel TV4 in 1997, became music video C4 in October 2003, reverted in 2008, renamed to FOUR in February 2011, then rebranded to its current form, Bravo in July 2016.
5	19	Whakaata Māori	Māori Television Service (govt.)	28 March 2004	Maori Television, Sky Free	1080i	576i	576i	Live stream and on-demand
Tax-payer funded content in Māori and English. Known as Maori Television from 2004 to 2022.
6	23	TVNZ Duke	TVNZ (govt.)	20 March 2016	TVNZ	1080i	1080i	1080i	Live stream and on-demand
operates between the hours of 12pm and 3am. Screens sport and general entertainment.
7	502	TVNZ 2+1	TVNZ (govt.)	1 September 2013	TVNZ	576i	576i	576i	on-demand
Timeshifted TVNZ 2, delayed by one hour (replaced TVNZ U)
8	4	Sky Open	Sky Network Television	30 August 1998	Kordia	1080i	1080i	1080i	Live stream and on-demand
Started off as a Subsidiary of Australia's Prime TV of three localised feeds before being sold to Sky TV in 2006
9	24	Rush	Sky Free	21 March 2022	Sky Free	1080i	576i	576i	Live stream and on-demand
10	N/A	Te Reo	Māori Television Service (govt.)	2008	N/A	No	No	No	Live stream and on-demand
Tax-payer funded content in 100% Māori. Previously broadcast on terrestrial and satellite until March 2025.
11	501	TVNZ 1+1	TVNZ (govt.)	1 July 2012	TVNZ	576i	576i	576i	on-demand
Timeshifted TVNZ 1, delayed by one hour (replaced TVNZ 7)
12	504	TVNZ Duke+1	TVNZ (govt.)	17 November 2020	TVNZ; Sky	576i	576i	576i	on-demand
Timeshifted TVNZ Duke, delayed by one hour.
13	503	ThreePlus1	Sky Free	30 March 2009	Sky Free	576i	576i	576i	Live stream and on-demand
timeshifted Three, delayed by one hour
14	512	Bravo Plus 1	NBCUniversal International Networks	26 June 2014	Sky Free	576i	576i	576i	Live stream and on-demand
Timeshifted Bravo, delayed by one hour
18	13	Eden	Sky Free	28 April 2012	Sky Free	1080i	576i	576i	Live stream and on-demand
Formerly known as Choice TV, rebranded eden on 21 March 2022.
19	21	HGTV	Sky Free	27 June 2016	Kordia; Sky Free	576i	576i	576i	Live stream and on-demand
Shows with a focus on home improvement, gardening, crafts, and remodeling.
20	90	Al Jazeera	Al Jazeera Media Network	25 October 2013	Kordia	576i	576i	576i	live unicast
Foreign news service

Freeview lower viewership nationwide channels
Channel number		DVB name(s)	Owner/parent company	Launch	H.222 Transport	Availability			
Channel number		DVB name(s)	Owner/parent company	Launch	H.222 Transport	Terrestrial	Satellite DVB		IPTV
Freeview	Sky	DVB name(s)	Owner/parent company	Launch	H.222 Transport	DVB 64-QAM	Freeview	Sky	IPTV
25	201	Shine TV	Rhema Media (corp.)	1 December 2002	Kordia; Sky Free	576i Whangarei, Rotorua, Taupo, Gisborne, Whanganui, Masterton, Nelson, South Canterbury, Invercargill	576i	576i	live unicast
Christian programming
26	206	Firstlight	Firstlight Charitable Trust	17 September 2012	Kordia; Sky Free	576i	576i	576i	live unicast
Family safe Christian programming
27	204	Hope Channel	Seventh-day Adventist Church	12 September 2015	Kordia; Sky Free	576i	576i	576i	live unicast
Christian Programming
31	86	Parliament TV	Kordia (distributor, govt.)	9 October 2007	Kordia; Sky Free	576i Kordia Metro only	576i	576i	live unicast
Live and replayed coverage of the New Zealand parliamentary sessions
200	N/A	CH200	Kordia	1 December 2020	Kordia	1080i	No	No	No
Formerly known as Kordia TV.

Freeview Kordia limited viewership local channels
NorDig LCN	DVB name	Owner/parent company	Launch	H.222 Transport	Availability	
NorDig LCN	DVB name	Owner/parent company	Launch	H.222 Transport	DVB 64-QAM	IPTV
33	Channel 33	New Zealand Culture and Media Group	16 November 2020	Kordia	Kordia Metro only	No
Local and international Chinese programming
36	Apna Television	Golam Moinuddin (private)	25 March 2014	Kordia	Auckland	selected on-demand
International Hindu programming in Hindi
39	Channel 39	Allied Press	1995	Kordia	Dunedin	No
Regional programming as well as Al Jazeera, DW TV, etc.
48	Television Hawke's Bay	Sawyer Television Limited	1994	local	Napier; Hastings only	No
Programming from local, national and international sources.

Freeview JDA limited viewership local channels
NorDig LCN	DVB name	Owner/parent company	Launch	H.222 Transport	Availability	
NorDig LCN	DVB name	Owner/parent company	Launch	H.222 Transport	DVB 64-QAM	IPTV
41	Wairarapa TV	noise productions ltd	2016	local	Wairarapa	Yes
Locally generated television content via its partner More FM.

Independent digital local channels
NorDig LCN	DVB name	Owner/parent company	Launch	H.222 Transport	Availability	
NorDig LCN	DVB name	Owner/parent company	Launch	H.222 Transport	DVB 64-QAM	IPTV
	Mainland Television	Media-7	1992	local	Nelson only	No
Rebroadcasts BBC World, Al Jazeera, DW TV, CCTV, VOA and locally produced news
	45 South TV			local	Oamaru only	No
Broadcasts 98% local content. Community station run by volunteers. Rebroadcasts TV3, Sommet Sports & Cue Television.

Freeview high priority nationwide audio only channels
Channel number		DVB name(s)	Owner/parent company	Launch	H.222 Transport	Availability				
Channel number		DVB name(s)	Owner/parent company	Launch	H.222 Transport	Terrestrial		Satellite DVB		IPTV
Freeview	Sky	DVB name(s)	Owner/parent company	Launch	H.222 Transport	FM/AM	DVB 64-QAM	Freeview	Sky	IPTV
50	421	RNZ National	Radio New Zealand (govt.)	1925	Kordia; Sky Free	Yes	Kordia metro only	Yes	Yes	live unicast
News/talk-back
51	422	RNZ Concert	Radio New Zealand (govt.)	24 February 1933; 93 years ago (as 2YC)	Kordia; Sky Free	Yes	Kordia metro only	Yes	Yes	live unicast
New Zealand's only commercial free classical music channel.

Freeview/Sky low priority nationwide audio only channels
NorDig LCN	DVB name	Owner/parent company	Launch	H.222 Transport	Availability				
NorDig LCN	DVB name	Owner/parent company	Launch	H.222 Transport	Terrestrial		Satellite DVB		IPTV
NorDig LCN	DVB name	Owner/parent company	Launch	H.222 Transport	FM	DVB 64-QAM	Freeview	Sky	IPTV
70	George FM	MediaWorks NZ (corp.)	1998	Sky Free	Yes	No	Yes	No	live unicast
Dance music station started off in Auckland only, sold off to Canadian and, later, Australian interests.
71	Radio Aotearoa		2023	Kordia; Sky Free	Auckland, Tauranga, Bay of Plenty	Yes	Yes	No	live unicast
hip hop music station that split from George FM.
	Niu FM	National Pacific Radio Trust	31 August 2002	Sky Free	Yes	No	Available on non-certified FTA receivers	No	live unicast
Pacific Island immigrate targeted music and news.
	Tahu FM	Independent iwi trusts	6 February 1991	Sky	Timaru, Christchurch, Kaikoura, Dunedin, Invercargill	No	Available on non-certified FTA receivers	No	live unicast

== Television stations in NZ-associated states ==
=== Cook Islands ===
- Cook Islands Television
- Mangaia Television
- Vaka Television

=== Niue ===
- TV Niue

== Foreign satellite channels ==
The following is a list of free-to-air DVB satellite services available in New Zealand. Most New Zealand homes already have a standard 60 cm satellite dish fitted which can pick up most of these channels, as these are also used (or have been used in the past) to pick up free-to-air and pay New Zealand television channels from Optus D1 (and historically, Optus B1). A frequency scanning (aka blind-scan) capable set-top box can be used to locate other services.

Name	Description	Frequency @ Pulse rate LNB IEEE band polarization
Optus D1 for 60 cm dish or greater
9 Network feed for STW	backhaul	12383 MHz @ 3.75 MBd; Ku linear vertical
7 Network SNG 1	backhaul	12635 MHz @ 7.2 MBd; Ku linear vertical
7 Network SNG 2	backhaul	12644 MHz @ 7.2 MBd; Ku linear vertical
7 Network SNG 3	backhaul	12653 MHz @ 7.2 MBd; Ku linear vertical
9 Network SNG 1	backhaul	12407 MHz @ 6.111 MBd; Ku linear vertical
9 Network SNG 2	backhaul	12421 MHz @ 6.111 MBd; Ku linear vertical
9 Network SNG 3	backhaul	12431 MHz @ 6.111 MBd; Ku linear vertical
Optus C1 for 60 cm dish or greater
Australian wildfeed links	backhaul	12407 MHz @ 24.45 MBd; Ku linear vertical
Intelsat 19 for 100 cm dish or greater
NHK World Japan TV	1080i state-owned English service	4060 MHz @ 26.59 MBd; C linear horizontal
NHK World Japan TV	576i state-owned English service	4060 MHz @ 26.59 MBd; C linear horizontal
Optus D2 for 60 cm dish or greater
Tele Padre Pio	Catholic Italian service	12396 MHz @ 22.5 MBd; Ku linear horizontal
Telepace	Catholic Italian/English service	12425 MHz @ 22.5 MBd; Ku linear horizontal
Al Hayat	Arabic service	12519 MHz @ 22.5 MBd; Ku linear vertical
AON	Religious English service	12519 MHz @ 22.5 MBd; Ku linear vertical
Channel NewsAsia	state-owned English service	12545 MHz @ 22.5 MBd; Ku linear vertical
Al Iraqiya	Arabic service	12545 MHz @ 22.5 MBd; Ku linear vertical
Salaam	Arabic service	12545 MHz @ 22.5 MBd; Ku linear vertical
3ABN	Religious English service	12545 MHz @ 22.5 MBd; Ku linear vertical
TVRI	state-owned Indonesian service	12.608 GHz @ 22.5 MBd; Ku linear horizontal
Kurdistan TV	Kurdish service	12.608 GHz @ 22.5 MBd; Ku linear horizontal
BVN	state-owned Dutch service	12644 MHz @ 22.5 MBd; Ku linear vertical
TRT 1	state-owned Turkish service	12644 MHz @ 22.5 MBd; Ku linear vertical
JUCETV	Religious English service	12644 MHz @ 22.5 MBd; Ku linear vertical
TBN	Religious English service	12644 MHz @ 22.5 MBd; Ku linear vertical
Church Channel	Religious English service	12644 MHz @ 22.5 MBd; Ku linear vertical
Smile of a Child	Religious English service	12644 MHz @ 22.5 MBd; Ku linear vertical
God TV	Religious English service	12644 MHz @ 22.5 MBd; Ku linear vertical
Daystar	Religious English service	12644 MHz @ 22.5 MBd; Ku linear vertical
Inspiration	Religious English service	12644 MHz @ 22.5 MBd; Ku linear vertical
EWTN	Religious English service	12644 MHz @ 22.5 MBd; Ku linear vertical
Al Forat	Arabic service	12706 MHz @ 22.5 MBd; Ku linear vertical
Press TV	English service	12706 MHz @ 22.5 MBd; Ku linear vertical
CGNTV	Religious English service	12706 MHz @ 22.5 MBd; Ku linear vertical
Hope Channel	Religious English service	12706 MHz @ 22.5 MBd; Ku linear vertical
Aghapy TV	Religious English service	12706 MHz @ 22.5 MBd; Ku linear vertical
RT	state-owned English service	12734 MHz @ 22.5 MBd; Ku linear vertical
TV3	private-owned Malaysian service	12734 MHz @ 22.5 MBd; Ku linear vertical
Suria	Singaporean-Malay service	12734 MHz @ 22.5 MBd; Ku linear vertical
EPT World	state-owned Greek service	12734 MHz @ 22.5 MBd; Ku linear vertical
Kurdsat	Kurdish service	12734 MHz @ 22.5 MBd; Ku linear vertical
TVR International	Romanian service	12734 MHz @ 22.5 MBd; Ku linear vertical
Duna	Hungarian service	12734 MHz @ 22.5 MBd; Ku linear vertical
Abu Dhabi Al Oula	Arabic service	12734 MHz @ 22.5 MBd; Ku linear vertical
Oman TV	Arabic service	12734 MHz @ 22.5 MBd; Ku linear vertical
AsiaSat 4 for 90 cm dish or greater
DaAi World	Taiwanese service	12430 MHz @ 20 MBd; Ku linear vertical
Intelsat 19 for 90 cm dish or greater
Arirang	state-owned English/Korean service	13557 MHz @ 13.333 MBd; Ku linear horizontal
NSS-9
BYU TV	Mormon Multilingual service	4185 MHz @ 6.527 MBd; 2m dish or greater C right hand circular
RFO Wallis & Futuna	French service	3922 MHz @ 2.895 MBd; 1m dish or greater C right hand circular

Historical discontinued services
Name	Description	Frequency @ Pulse rate LNB IEEE band polarization
Optus D1 for 60 cm dish or greater
Southern Cross 10	regional backup	12635 MHz @ 5.1 MBd; Ku linear vertical
Tasmanian SBS One	state-owned English/Foreign service	12646 MHz @ 12.6 MBd; Ku linear vertical
Tasmanian SBS Two	state-owned English/Foreign service	12646 MHz @ 12.6 MBd; Ku linear vertical
Tasmanian SBS HD	simulcast service	12646 MHz @ 12.6 MBd; Ku linear vertical
Intelsat 5 for 90 cm dish or greater
BBC World News	state-owned English service	4160 MHz @ 26.48 MBd; C linear horizontal
Iqraa	Arabic	4.16 GHz @ 26.48 MBd; C linear horizontal
Intelsat 8
ABC Australia	state-owned English service	4.1 GHz @ 26.48 MBd; 180 cm dish or greater C linear horizontal
MAC TV	Taiwanese service	12504 MHz @ 3.073 MBd; 90 cm dish or greater Ku linear vertical

== See also ==
- Australasian television frequencies
- Television in New Zealand
