= Now TV (New Zealand) =

- Country: New Zealand
- Broadcast area: Christchurch

Programming
- Language: English
- Picture format: 576i PAL colour

History
- Launched: 3 November 1997
- Closed: 31 March 2002
- Former names: CHTV

Availability

Terrestrial
- Analogue: Channel 52 (Christchurch)

Now TV (formerly Christchurch Television or CHTV) was a television station in Christchurch. It opened in 1997 by initiative of former Canterbury Television staff, and closed in 2002, merging with the aforementioned station.

== History ==
=== CHTV ===
CHTV was due to begin transmission in October 1997. Channel Seven Ltd., owner of Nelson's Mainland Television, which sought to bring back local television to Wellington, set up a joint-venture with the operating company, It inherited most of CTV's team, as the station joined the Family Television Network following the closure of TVNZ's Horizon Pacific Television, to which it was an affiliate.

CHTV started broadcasting on 3 November 1997, employing 15 staff. The weekday programmes would begin at 5:30pm with the news. It also aired programmes on sports, motoring and gardening. Among the station's non-news programmes was On Q, a youth magazine, and a three-hour programme on William Shakespeare, An Evening with Shakespeare, in April 1998. In December, it inked an agreement with the Canterbury Rugby Football Union to transmit Saturday matches from April 1998.

Sue Wells returned to host Canterbury Today on 24 April 1998 after two months of sick leave, replacing George Balani. The station was temporarily off air for three hours starting from 1pm on 20 May 1998, when a contractor cut the cable on Marleys Hill at the Port Hills. Overnight and during the morning, the channel aired Welcome to Canterbury (formerly on CTV), which in July 1998 was set to be screened all day as a closed-circuit channel on city hotels. The station broadcast the opening of the RDH Steel Technology Centre on 24 July. At the end of 1998, the station ran The Press Debate over a seven-week period.

The channel carried both the Canterbury Tennis Championships and the ASB Bank Trans-Tasman Challenge at Wilding Park on 18-19 January 1999. On 19-23 April, it aired Newsnight at 7:30pm, a pilot service produced by students of Christchurch Polytechnic's Broadcasting School. On 29 August, it aired St Andrew's performance of Romeo and Juliet.

The station had lost its profitability in 2000, as it had invested on a radio station on 1017 AM. By December of that year, it was airing Community Access Television on Sundays from 10am to 12pm.

=== Now TV ===
On 26 March 2001, CHTV was renamed Now TV. The name change came following the grafual purchase of shares to West Media Limited, as well as a move by general manager David Compton to focus more on affairs outside of Canterbury. The company also owned two other stations on the island, Channel 9 in Dunedin and Mercury Television in Invercargill. It was set to premiere The Voice of Migrants as part of Community Access Television in late July of that year, but got its first edition postponed due to a technical mishap. Beginning August, it screened the Ken Burns documentary Jazz. The station on 1017 AM, formerly Canterbury On Air, was renamed Now Radio in late 2001; it closed at the end of May as West 175 Media sought to concentrate its efforts on Now TV.

In July 2002, the station closed and CTV took over some of its staff and programmes following a NZ$900,000 acquisition by Canterbury Television.
