= Visitor Television =

- Country: New Zealand
- Broadcast area: Canterbury
- Headquarters: 12 Venture Place; Christchurch

Programming
- Picture format: 16:9

Ownership
- Owner: Star Media
- Sister channels: Canterbury Television

History
- Launched: 2005
- Closed: 2011

Availability

Terrestrial
- Digital (Ceased 16 December 2016 11:59pm NZDT): Freeview Channel 40; Canterbury
- Analogue (Ceased 28 April 2013 2:00am NZST): UHF Channel 48, 687.25 MHz (later channel 44 655.25 MHz) from Sugarloaf

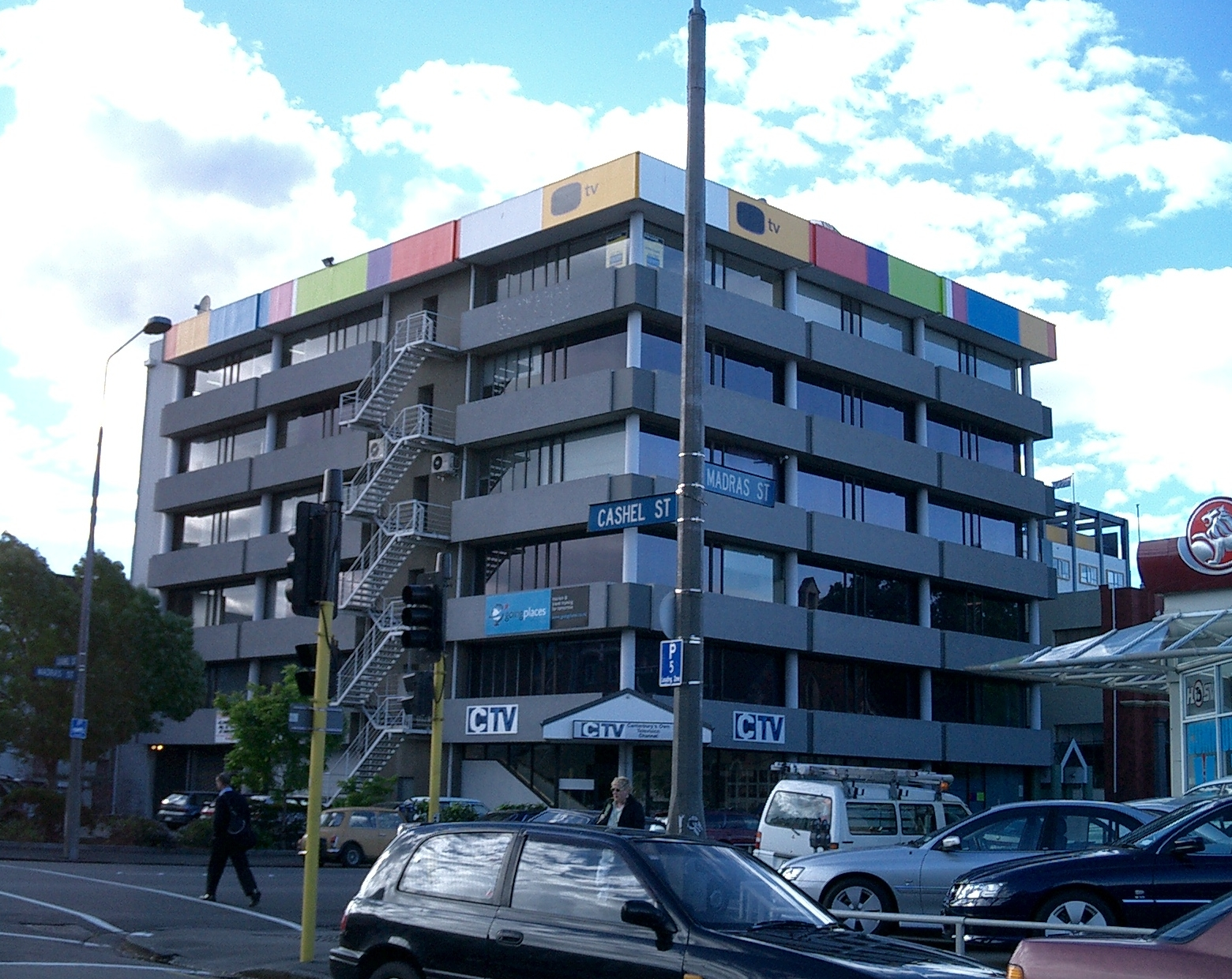
The CTV building in 2004

Visitor Television (VTV) was a tourist television station broadcasting in Canterbury, New Zealand.

A sister operation to Canterbury Television, it began broadcasting in 2005, airing a tourist programme for one hour on loop. The station was available on terrestrial television and on TelstraClear's cable TV service.

== History ==
Canterbury Television (and, from 1997 to 2002, Now TV) aired Welcome to Canterbury, generally after dark, and as a closed circuit channel for hotels beginning in 1998.

VTV was announced in May 2005, precisely when the Canterbury region was receiving three million visits as of 2003. In addition to the one-hour looped programme, advertisers could book spots on the channel. It broadcast on UHF channel 52 at first. (Note: Formerly used by Cry TV and Freedom TV.)

VTV reportedly shut down due to the 2011 Christchurch earthquake and never resumed operations.
