= FTN =

FTN may refer to:

- Ftn (TV channel), a former British channel
- Family Television Network, a defunct New Zealand network of local television stations
- FemTechNet, a website
- First Temperate Neolithic
- Franja Transversal del Norte, a region of Guatemala
- Fratton railway station, in England
- Fulton (Amtrak station), in Kentucky, US
- Faculty of Technical Sciences, (Serbian: Fakultet Tehničkih Nauka), in Novi Sad, Serbia
- Nikkormat FTn, a Nikon film SLR camera
