= List of Christchurch City Council elected members =

The Christchurch City Council is the local government authority for Christchurch, New Zealand. The council is elected for three-year terms; at each election voters elect a mayor, city councillors and community board members. There are current 15 city councillors and 37 community board members across 6 community boards.

The mayor, Phil Mauger, is an independent (he ran with the slogan "Let's Get Stuff Done" on the ballot); he has generally been categorised as centre-right. On the left, three city councillors affiliate exclusively to The People's Choice, one exclusively to the New Zealand Labour Party, and two to both groups. On the right, two city councillors affiliate to Independent Citizens. Eight city councillors (of various political leanings) are independents with no stated affiliations.

== 2025–2028 (current) term ==
=== Council ===
The composition of the council for the 2025–2028 term is:

Role	Portrait	Name	Affiliation	Ward
Mayor		Phil Mauger	Let's Get Stuff Done	Elected at-large
Deputy mayor		Victoria Henstock	Your Local Independent Community Voice	Papanui
Councillor		Tyrone Fields	The People's Choice	Banks Peninsula
Councillor		Kelly Barber	Independent for Burwood	Burwood
Councillor		Tim Scandrett	Independent	Cashmere
Councillor		Jake McLellan	Labour	Central
Councillor		Celeste Donovan	Independent	Coastal
Councillor		David Cartwright	Independent Citizens	Fendalton
Councillor		Andrei Moore	Independent	Halswell
Councillor		Aaron Keown	Independent Candidate for Harewood	Harewood
Councillor		Nathaniel Herz Jardine	The People's Choice	Heathcote
Councillor		Mark Peters	Independent for Hornby	Hornby
Councillor		Yani Johanson	The People's Choice – Labour	Linwood
Councillor		Pauline Cotter	The People's Choice	Innes
Councillor		Tyla Harrison-Hunt	The People's Choice	Riccarton
Councillor		Melanie Coker	The People's Choice – Labour	Spreydon
Councillor		Sam MacDonald	Independent Citizens	Waimairi

== 2022–2025 ==
=== Council ===
The composition of the council for the 2022–2025 term is:

Christchurch City Council
Position	Ward	Photo	Name	Ticket
Mayor	At large		Phil Mauger	Let's Get Stuff Done
Deputy mayor	Innes		Pauline Cotter	The People's Choice
Councillor	Banks Peninsula		Tyrone Fields	The People's Choice
Councillor	Burwood		Kelly Barber	Independent for Burwood
Councillor	Cashmere		Tim Scandrett	Truly Independent
Councillor	Central		Jake McLellan	Labour
Councillor	Coastal		Celeste Donovan	Independent – Let's Make Waves
Councillor	Fendalton		James Gough	Independent Citizens
Councillor	Halswell		Andrei Moore	Independent
Councillor	Harewood		Aaron Keown	Independent Voice of Harewood
Councillor	Heathcote		Sara Templeton	Strong Community: Sustainable Future
Councillor	Hornby		Mark Peters	Independent for Hornby
Councillor	Linwood		Yani Johanson	The People's Choice – Labour
Councillor	Papanui		Victoria Henstock	Your Local Independent Community Voice
Councillor	Riccarton		Tyla Harrison-Hunt	The People's Choice
Councillor	Spreydon		Melanie Coker	The People's Choice – Labour
Councillor	Waimairi		Sam MacDonald	Independent Citizens

=== Community Boards ===
==== Te Pātaka o Rākaihautū Banks Peninsula ====
Board member Jillian Frater was elected at a by-election in 2024. Reuben Davidson resigned to stand as the Labour candidate for Christchurch East in the 2023 general election, which he won.

Te Pātaka o Rākaihautū Banks Peninsula Community Board
Position	Subdivision	Name	Affiliation (if any)
Chairperson	Wairewa	Lyn Leslie	Independent
Member	Lyttelton	Cathy Lum-Webb	The People's Choice
Member	Mount Herbert	Howard Needham	Independent
Member	Mount Herbert	Luana Swindells	The People's Choice
Member	Akaroa	Nigel Harrison	Independent
Member	Akaroa	Asif Hussain	Independent
Member	Lyttelton	Jillian Frater	The People's Choice
Former Members
Member	Lyttelton	Reuben Davidson	The People's Choice

==== Waitai Coastal-Burwood-Linwood ====
Waitai Coastal-Burwood-Linwood Community Board
Position	Ward	Member	Affiliation (if any)
Chairperson	Linwood	Paul McMahon	The People's Choice – Labour
Deputy Chairperson	Linwood	Jackie Simons	The People's Choice – Labour
Member	Burwood	Greg Mitchell	Independent
Member	Burwood	Tim Baker	Labour
Member	Coastal	Jo Zervos	Independent
Member	Coastal	Alex Hewison	The People's Choice – Labour

==== Waimāero Fendalton–Waimairi–Harewood ====
Board member Shirish Paranjape resigned from the board 1 July 2025; the vacancy will not be filled until the 2025 election.

Waimāero Fendalton–Waimairi–Harewood Community Board
Position	Ward	Member	Affiliation (if any)
Chairperson	Harewood	Jason Middlemiss	Independent Citizens
Deputy Chairperson	Fendalton	Bridget Williams	Independent Citizens
Member	Harewood	Linda Chen	Independent Citizens
Member	Waimairi	Nicola McCormick	Avonhead Community Group
Member	Waimairi	Shirish Paranjape	Independent Citizens
Member	Fendalton	David Cartwright	Independent Citizens

==== Waipuna Halswell-Hornby-Riccarton ====
Helen Broughton was chairperson from the 2022 election until 9 May 2024. She reigned amid controversy over her leadership and the state of "dysfunction" on the board. Her initial resignation was rejected, as she included the stipulation that she remain board representative for issues relating to planning. She later resigned again, that time with no stipulations (which was accepted). She remained a member of the community board, serving as deputy chairperson. Marie Pollisco took over from Broughton. Polilisco was previously deputy chairperson. She has been the subject of concerns around a possible conflict of interest, as she also works for the city council's planning department.

Henk Buunk was formerly affiliated to The People's Choice, but resigned the affiliation to vote against the appointment of Pollisco as chair.

Gamal Fouda, the Imam of Al Noor Mosque, was a board member from the 2022 election until 31 March 2025. He moved to Australia in early 2025 and thus resigned from the board. Luke Chandler was appointed to the vacancy.

Waipuna Halswell-Hornby-Riccarton Community Board
Position	Ward	Member	Affiliation (if any)
Chairperson	Halswell	Marie Pollisco	The People's Choice
Deputy Chairperson	Riccarton	Helen Broughton	Independent Citizens
Member 2022	Hornby	Sarah Brunton	Independent
Member	Hornby	Henk Buunk	Independent
Member	Halswell	Debbie Mora	Independent
Member	Riccarton	Luke Chandler	Independent Citizens
Former Members
Member	Riccarton	Gamal Fouda	The People's Choice

==== Waipapa Papanui-Innes-Central ====
Ali Jones was elected at a by-election in 2023. Shreejana Chhetri resigned within one month of the election, triggering a by-election.

Waipapa Papanui-Innes-Central Community Board
Position	Ward	Member	Affiliation (if any)
Chairperson	Papanui	Emma Norrish	Independent
Deputy Chairperson	Papanui	Simon Britten	Think Papanui
Member	Innes	Emma Twaddell	Independent
Member	Central	Sunita Gautam	Labour
Member	Central	John Miller	Labour
Member	Innes	Ali Jones	Independent
Former Members
Member	Innes	Shreejana Chhetri	The People's Choice

==== Waihoro Spreydon-Cashmere-Heathcote ====
Waihoro Spreydon-Cashmere-Heathcote Community Board
Position	Ward	Member	Affiliation (if any)
Chairperson	Spreydon	Callum Ward	The People's Choice – Labour
Deputy Chairperson	Cashmere	Keir Leslie	The People's Choice – Labour
Member	Spreydon	Roy Kenneally	The People's Choice – Labour
Member	Cashmere	Lee Sampson	The People's Choice – Labour
Member	Heathcote	Will Hall	Independent Voice For Heathcote
Member	Heathcote	Tim Lindley	For Communities You'll Love To Live In

== 2019–2022 ==
=== Council ===
The composition of the council for the 2019–2022 term was:

Position	Name	Ticket	Ward
Mayor	Lianne Dalziel	Best for Christchurch	At large
Deputy mayor	Andrew Turner	The People's Choice	Banks Peninsula
Councillor	Phil Mauger	Independent	Burwood
Councillor	Tim Scandrett	Independent	Cashmere
Councillor	Jake McLellan	Labour	Central
Councillor	James Daniels (until June 2021)	Your Vote – Your Voice Independent	Coastal
Councillor	Celeste Donovan (from October 2021)	Independent	Coastal
Councillor	James Gough	Independent Citizens	Fendalton
Councillor	Anne Galloway	The People's Choice	Halswell
Councillor	Aaron Keown	Independent	Harewood
Councillor	Sara Templeton	Strong Community: Healthy Environment	Heathcote
Councillor	Jimmy Chen	The People's Choice – Labour	Hornby
Councillor	Pauline Cotter	The People's Choice	Innes
Councillor	Yani Johanson	The People's Choice – Labour	Linwood
Councillor	Mike Davidson	Independent	Papanui
Councillor	Catherine Chu	Independent Citizens	Riccarton
Councillor	Melanie Coker	The People's Choice – Labour	Spreydon
Councillor	Sam MacDonald	Independent Citizens	Waimairi

== 2016–2019 ==
=== Council ===
The election held via postal vote on 8 October 2016, was the first to use the new wards as a result of the representation review.

Key features of the Local Government Commission's final decision included:

16 councillors, plus the mayor, with one councillor elected from each of the 16 wards (a change from the current 13 councillors elected from six wards, each with two members, apart from Banks Peninsula, which currently has a single member) Banks Peninsula Ward stays as it is Six urban community boards One Banks Peninsula community board Overall, the number of elected members stays the same as present, at 54.

Position	Name	Ticket	Ward
Mayor	Lianne Dalziel	Best for Christchurch	At large
Deputy mayor	Andrew Turner	The People's Choice	Banks Peninsula
Councillor	Glenn Livingstone	The People's Choice – Labour	Burwood
Councillor	Tim Scandrett	Independent	Cashmere
Councillor	Deon Swiggs	Independent – Let's Get It Done	Central
Councillor	David East	Independent	Coastal
Councillor	Jamie Gough	Independent Citizens	Fendalton
Councillor	Anne Galloway	The People's Choice	Halswell
Councillor	Aaron Keown	True Independent	Harewood
Councillor	Sara Templeton	Strong Communities for a Stronger Christchurch	Heathcote
Councillor	Jimmy Chen	The People's Choice – Labour	Hornby
Councillor	Pauline Cotter	The People's Choice	Innes
Councillor	Yani Johnson	The People's Choice – Labour	Linwood
Councillor	Mike Davidson	The Right Choice for Papanui & Christchurch	Papanui
Councillor	Vicki Buck		Riccarton
Councillor	Phil Clearwater	The People's Choice – Labour	Spreydon
Councillor	Raf Manji	Independent	Waimairi

== 2013–2016 ==
=== Council ===
Five of the thirteen councillors did not stand for re-election in 2013. Another four councillors failed to get re-elected (deputy-mayor Ngaire Button, Helen Broughton, Claudia Reid, and Aaron Keown). Hence, only four councillor were returned for another term (Yani Johanson, Jimmy Chen, Glenn Livingstone, and Jamie Gough), to be joined by nine new members plus a new mayor. For the 2013–2016 term, the composition of the council is as follows:

Position	Name	Ticket	Ward
Mayor	Lianne Dalziel	One City Together	At large
Deputy mayor	Vicki Buck	A Vote for me is a Vote for You	Riccarton–Wigram
Councillor	Jimmy Chen	The People's Choice – Labour	Riccarton–Wigram
Councillor	Andrew Turner	The People's Choice	Banks Peninsula
Councillor	David East	Independent	Burwood–Pegasus
Councillor	Glenn Livingstone	The People's Choice – Labour	Burwood–Pegasus
Councillor	Jamie Gough	Independent Citizens	Fendalton–Waimairi
Councillor	Raf Manji	Independent	Fendalton–Waimairi
Councillor	Yani Johanson	The People's Choice – Labour	Hagley–Ferrymead
Councillor	Paul Lonsdale	Independent	Hagley–Ferrymead
Councillor	Ali Jones	Independent	Shirley–Papanui
Councillor	Pauline Cotter	The People's Choice – Labour	Shirley–Papanui
Councillor	Phil Clearwater	The People's Choice – Labour	Spreydon–Heathcote
Councillor	Tim Scandrett	Independent	Spreydon–Heathcote

== 2010–2013 ==
=== Council ===
During the 2010–2013 term, the composition of the council was as shown in the table below. The Press in an editorial described the situation during the three years as often "tumultuous" and there were many calls for a cleanout of elected members at the 2013 local body elections. During the term, the government appointed an overseer to council (Kerry Marshall) and "came within an ace of sacking the council completely." Five city councillors (Sue Wells, Barry Corbett, Sally Buck, Tim Carter, and Peter Beck) and the mayor (Bob Parker) did not stand for re-election.

Position	Name	Ticket	Ward
Mayor	Bob Parker	Independent	At large
Deputy mayor	Ngaire Button	Independent Citizens	Shirley–Papanui
Councillor	Aaron Keown	Christchurch City Vision	Shirley–Papanui
Councillor	Claudia Reid	Independent	Banks Peninsula
Councillor	Glenn Livingstone	The People's Choice	Burwood–Pegasus
Councillor	Chrissie Williams (resigned)	Independent	Burwood–Pegasus
Councillor	Peter Beck (succeeded Williams)	Independent	Burwood–Pegasus
Councillor	Sally Buck	Independent	Fendalton–Waimairi
Councillor	Jamie Gough	Independent Citizens	Fendalton–Waimairi
Councillor	Tim Carter	Independent	Hagley–Ferrymead
Councillor	Yani Johanson	The People's Choice	Hagley–Ferrymead
Councillor	Helen Broughton	Independent Citizens	Riccarton–Wigram
Councillor	Jimmy Chen	The People's Choice	Riccarton–Wigram
Councillor	Barry Corbett	Independent	Spreydon–Heathcote
Councillor	Sue Wells	Independent	Spreydon–Heathcote

== 2007–2010 ==
=== Council ===
During the 2007–2010 term, the composition of the council was as shown in the table below. The mayor was elected at large. There were seven wards, with six of them electing two councillors each, plus one councillor in the Banks Peninsula ward. Bob Parker won his first mayoral election following the amalgamation of Christchurch City and Banks Peninsula District in 2006; Parker had been Banks Peninsula's last mayor. He defeated Megan Woods, who later became an MP for the Labour Party.

Claudia Reid won her first term on the council for the Banks Peninsula ward, defeating Steve Lowndes who would later become chairman of Environment Canterbury. In the Shirley–Papanui ward, Norm Withers and Ngaire Button were elected, with Aaron Keown coming in third place. Keown has since won most subsequent elections.

Position	Name	Ticket	Ward
Mayor	Bob Parker	Independent	At large
Deputy mayor	Norm Withers	Independent	Shirley–Papanui
Councillor	Ngaire Button	Christchurch City Vision	Shirley–Papanui
Councillor	Claudia Reid	Independent	Banks Peninsula
Councillor	Gail Sheriff	Independent	Burwood–Pegasus
Councillor	Chrissie Williams	Christchurch 2021	Burwood–Pegasus
Councillor	Sally Buck	Independent	Fendalton–Waimairi
Councillor	Mike Wall	Independent Citizens	Fendalton–Waimairi
Councillor	David Cox	Independent	Hagley–Ferrymead
Councillor	Yani Johanson	Christchurch 2021	Hagley–Ferrymead
Councillor	Helen Broughton	Independent Citizens	Riccarton–Wigram
Councillor	Bob Shearing	Independent Citizens	Riccarton–Wigram
Councillor	Sue Wells	Independent	Spreydon–Heathcote
Councillor	Barry Corbett	Independent	Spreydon–Heathcote

== 2004–2007 ==
=== Council ===
During the 2004–2007 term, the composition of the council was as shown in the table below. The mayor was elected at large. At the time of the 2004 local elections, there were six wards electing two councillors each. Garry Moore won his third mayoral election, with Aaron Keown coming a distant second; Keown has since the 2010 local elections won most subsequent elections as a city councillor. Denis O'Rourke, who had been a councillor since the 1989 local elections, stood in the Hagley–Ferrymead ward and came fifth.

On 6 March 2006, Banks Peninsula District was merged with Christchurch City. Banks Peninsula's outgoing mayor, Bob Parker, won the by-election for the new Banks Peninsula ward and was sworn in as a city councillor on 9 March 2006.

Position	Name	Ticket	Ward
Mayor	Garry Moore	Christchurch 2021	At large
Deputy mayor	Carole Evans	Independent	Burwood–Pegasus
Councillor	Gail Sheriff	Christchurch 2021	Burwood–Pegasus
Councillor	Norm Withers	Independent	Shirley–Papanui
Councillor	Graham Condon	Independent	Shirley–Papanui
Councillor	Pat Harrow	Independent Citizens	Fendalton–Waimairi
Councillor	Sally Buck	Independent	Fendalton–Waimairi
Councillor	David Cox	Independent	Hagley–Ferrymead
Councillor	Anna Crighton	Christchurch 2021	Hagley–Ferrymead
Councillor	Helen Broughton	Independent Citizens	Riccarton–Wigram
Councillor	Bob Shearing	Independent Citizens	Riccarton–Wigram
Councillor	Barry Corbett	Independent	Spreydon–Heathcote
Councillor	Sue Wells	Independent	Spreydon–Heathcote
Councillor	Bob Parker (from March 2006)	Independent	Banks Peninsula
