= Channel North Television =

New Zealand television channel

- Country: New Zealand
- Broadcast area: Whangārei
- Headquarters: Whangārei, New Zealand

Programming
- Picture format: 576i (SDTV) 16:9

Ownership
- Owner: Northland TV Charitable Trust

History
- Launched: 1 August 2008
- Closed: 31 August 2017

Links
- Website: Official Website

Availability

Terrestrial
- UHF: Channel 40
- Freeview|HD: Channel 35

Channel North was a free to air public channel in Whangārei, New Zealand.

The channel was owned by the Northland TV Charitable Trust a not-for-profit community group. On 1 December 2011 Channel North was broadcasting digital signals on the Freeview|HD platform. On 31 August 2017 Channel North stopped broadcasting on Freeview|HD and became an online-only channel.

== See also ==
- List of New Zealand television channels
