= Canterbury Television =

New Zealand television station

CTV – Canterbury Television
- Country: New Zealand
- Broadcast area: Canterbury
- Headquarters: 12 Venture Place; Christchurch

Programming
- Picture format: 16:9

Ownership
- Owner: Star Media
- Sister channels: Visitor Television

History
- Launched: 17 June 1991
- Former names: CHTV, NOW TV

Links
- Website: CTV

Availability

Terrestrial
- Digital (Ceased 16 December 2016 11:59pm NZDT): Freeview Channel 40; Canterbury
- Analogue (Ceased 28 April 2013 2:00am NZST): UHF Channel 48, 687.25 MHz (later channel 44 655.25 MHz) from Sugarloaf

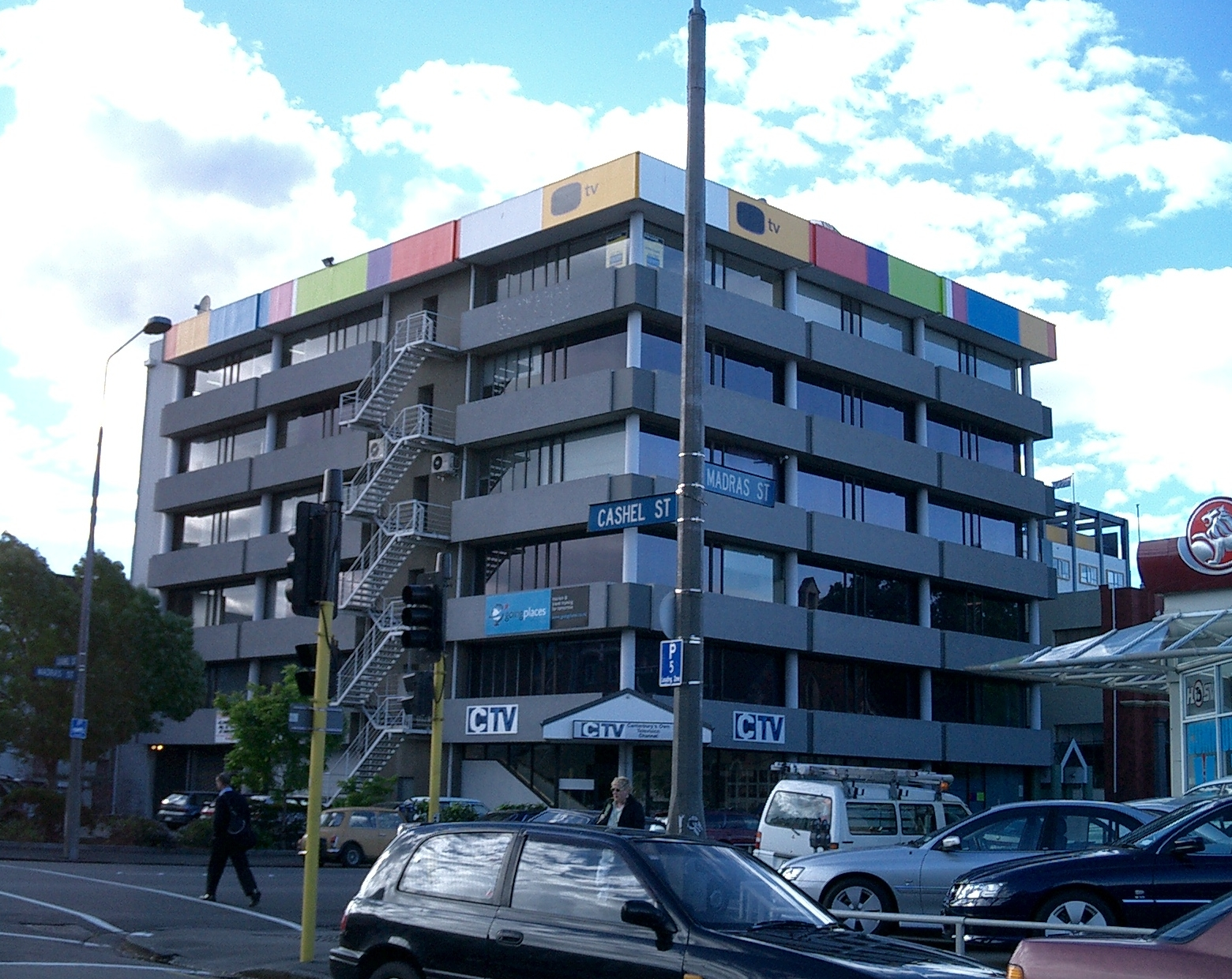
The CTV building in 2004

Canterbury Television (CTV) was an independent television station broadcasting in Canterbury, New Zealand.

The name is synonymous with regional television in New Zealand as it was the name of the first regional broadcaster to operate in New Zealand. CTV produced and screened more than twenty hours of locally based programming every week. It also screened overseas programming from Deutsche Welle and Al Jazeera. It was broadcast from the Sugarloaf transmitter on the Port Hills. The transmitter, on UHF channel 48, was an NEC 2kW transmitter and the radiated EIRP was 25kW.

On 22 February 2011 Christchurch, was hit by a 6.3 magnitude earthquake and the CTV Building collapsed killing 16 staff members and destroying all of CTV's equipment. On 18 April 2011 CTV resumed service in a new base location at the Mainland Press building in the Christchurch suburb of Harewood.

As of 18 March 2013, CTV commenced digital free-to-air transmissions on Freeview logical channel 40. CTV was also on Vodafone Channel 199. The station ceased broadcasting on Friday, 16 December 2016 at midnight. CTV now operates as a web-based platform as of 19 December 2016 under the Star Media brand.

== History ==
Canterbury Television successfully applied for a UHF tender in early 1990. Its three key people at founding time were Joanna McMenamin, formerly editor of TV One's regional news programme The Mainland Touch, local broadcaster Brian Allpress and Don Crerar. The team pledged that the station would fill the gap in regional programming and advertising provided by national networks.

CTV began broadcasting from the original TVNZ Christchurch studios at Gloucester Street on 17 June 1991 and initially ran from 5 pm until approximately 11 pm, seven days a week. The schedule for CTV's opening night was as follows:

- 5:00pm − Mork & Mindy
- 5:30pm − First Report: The news for Canterbury, about Canterbury, presented by Grant Mangin. News, issues and features from the region plus national and international headlines.
- 6:10pm − Taxi
- 6:40pm − The Tripods
- 7:15pm − DB Sport (published as CTV Monday Sport): Sue Wells, Wayne Smith and David Di Somma bring a Canterbury perspective to the best of the weekend's sporting action.
- 7:50pm − Colin's Sandwich
- 8:35pm − George Balani: George Balani hosts a live show covering any issues − entertaining, controversial, political or just plain fun.
- 9:15pm − CTV Report: Headlines from New Zealand and overseas. News and features from Canterbury.
- 9:30pm − Widows (series one)
- 10:45pm − Soap
- 11:30pm − Closedown

The station sided with Horizon Pacific Television until its closure in 1997, which suspended its operations. On 23 October, the Family Television Network, through its Canterbury affiliate company CFTN, agreed to move from the former Cry TV frequency to UHF 44, where CTV was housed, also causing the return of almost 20 former staff. During this phase, the station was known as CTV Family Television Network. The move came a week before CHTV was set to begin operations.

In 1999, yet to be signed New Zealand soprano Hayley Westenra performed on CTV. The appearance led to her being signed by Universal Music Group New Zealand.

FTN sold its shares in CTV to businessman Dennis Chapman, now being owned by the Challenge Media Foundation. Its new owners also decided to cut its staff in order to keep the station afloat.

In 2002, NowTV (formerly known as CHTV) and CTV merged, headquartered into the NowTV Building.

In 2006, CTV was the chief sponsor of the Canterbury United soccer team.

Today in Canterbury, a nightly news programme, started in March 2008.

In late 2008 CTV gained popularity with the New Zealand professional wrestling promotion Impact Pro Wrestling airing IPW Ignition weekly. The first episode premiered on 5 October 2008.

In March 2009, CTV started screening Graham Kerr's Kitchen and Nick Stellino's Cucina Amore, half-hour cooking programmes from the 1990s.

In September 2010, the CTV Building had received superficial damage in the 4 September earthquake, but was "given a clean bill of health" by structural engineers, according to the owners. Nevertheless, it collapsed in the February 2011 earthquake while the programme Witness was playing, resulting in the greatest single source of loss of life in that earthquake. The building had been built around 1986 (although reports of the building's construction date vary: Chip Le Grand of The Australian said – possibly confusing it with the older CHTV3 building – 1960; a 1 March 2011 NZPA report said 1991 or shortly before; and a 4 March 2011 New Zealand Herald editorial said 1972).

On 18 April 2011, CTV was back on air at 5.30 pm for the first time since February's earthquake. The station began with a two-hour broadcast of news and then another hour of interviews with people involved in the earthquake recovery. Shows would screen nationwide on Māori Television the day after each CTV broadcast.

On 18 March 2013, CTV joined Freeview, broadcasting from Sugarloaf, Christchurch on Channel 40. They extended their reach to South Canterbury on 1 June 2013, broadcasting from Cave Hill, Timaru.

CTV was bought by Star Media in August 2015 and relocated to the company's premises in Middleton.

=== 2011 Christchurch earthquake ===
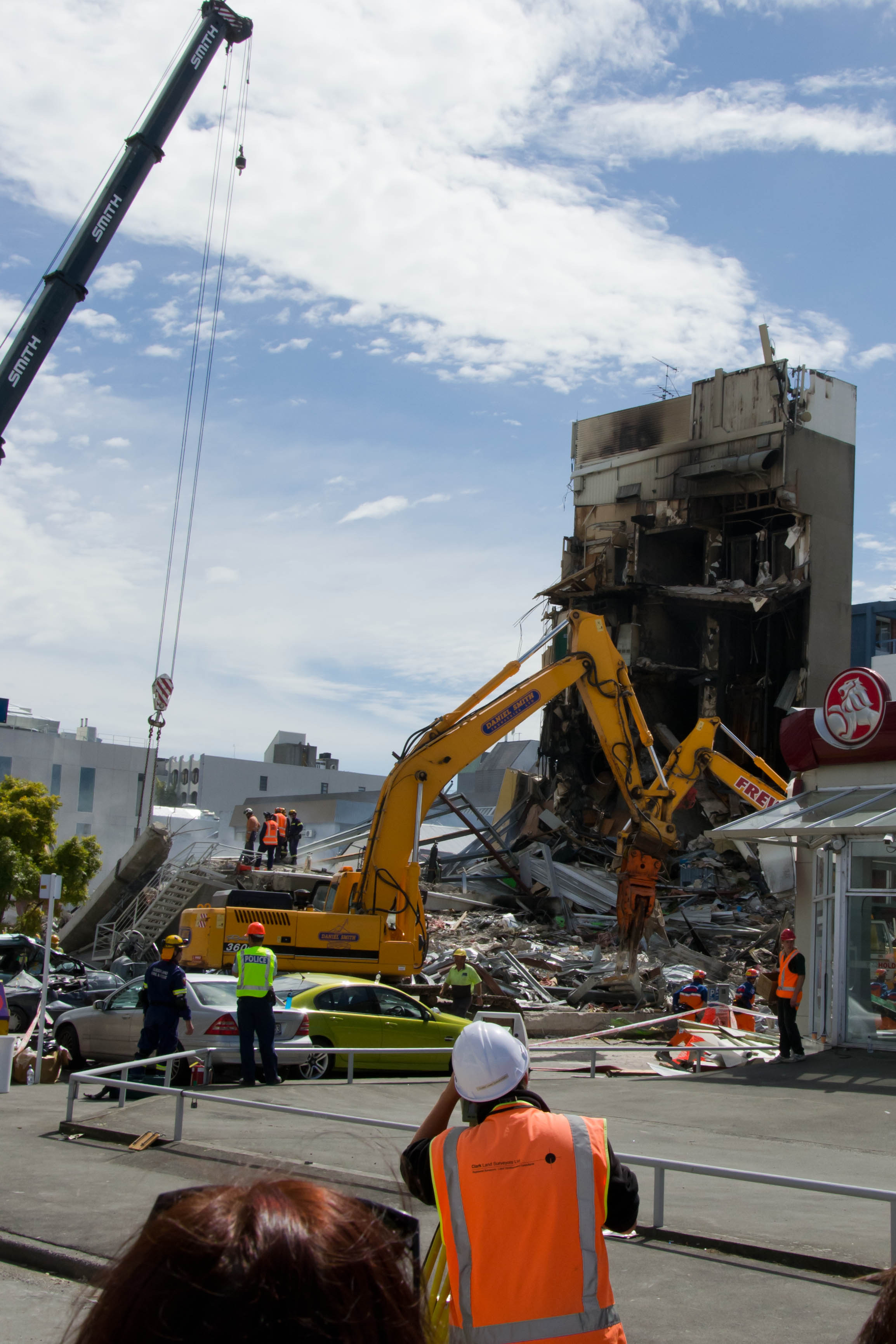
The CTV Building post-earthquake (24 February 2011)

The six-story CTV Building located at 249 Madras Street, on the Cashel Street corner (43.532751°S 172.6424°E), collapsed in the 22 February 2011 Christchurch earthquake and CTV lost transmission. CTV's main studios were destroyed and the building's lift cavity, the main part of the structure left upright, caught fire. On 23 February, police decided that the damage was not survivable, and rescue efforts at the building were suspended. Initially more than 100 people were believed to have died in the building. Fire-fighting and recovery operations resumed that evening. Of the 166 confirmed dead by 12 March 2011, 94 were recovered from the CTV building. Many of the dead and missing were faculty and students at the King's Education school for English language, located on the third floor of the CTV building. King's drew students from Asia and elsewhere. The school was attempting to provide as much information as possible to families.

The Port Hills transmitters were understood to be undamaged. CTV's sister channel VTV (Visitors Television) also ceased broadcasting because of the quake.

CTV's website was still functioning immediately after the earthquake, but was later replaced with this statement:

The building that housed the operations of Canterbury Television was destroyed in the earthquake of February 22, 2011. Many of our staff are missing and lives have been lost. The thoughts and heartfelt sympathies of those who remain go out to the families and friends of our missing colleagues, and to all in Christchurch who are missing or have lost a loved one in this tragedy.

A coronial inquest into the CTV building's collapse reported back to the Government in December 2012, one month later than expected, finding the building's design was deficient and should not have been approved.

== Past presenters ==
- Sue Wells – host of Susan Sells
- Phil Gifford – Co-host of 'Gifford and Balani'
- Jo Giles – host of 'Shopping with Jo' and 'In Depth' (died in the 2011 Canterbury earthquake)
- Jim Hopkins – host of The Knackered Chef, Jim Hopkins Tonight and A Smattering of Ominions
