= 45 South Television =

- Broadcast area: Oamaru

Programming
- Picture format: PAL

History
- Launched: 2006
- Closed: December 2024

45 South Television was a regional television station operating in Oamaru, New Zealand, founded by Ken Jones. The station was, throughout its existence, the smallest such station in the country, often lagging behind in funding allocations. The station closed down in December 2024.

== History ==
45 South started broadcasting in September 2006 using an NZ$10 kitchen wok (an NZ$20,000 transmitter was not within the budget of the station) from The Warehouse as the basis for its transmitter, which he developed in his spare time. He had originally built the transmitter as a means to receive broadband internet. It initially broadcast on UHF channel 41 on analogue terrestrial television from Cape Wanbrow. Regular broadcasts began in January 2007. The station unsuccessfully applied for a New Zealand On Air funding plan in 2009. Station manager Tony Reynolds showed his dissatisfaction, largely because the funding body applied changes based on viewing audience criteria.

By 2012, the station started broadcasting on Freeview channel 34, sharing a multiplex with TV3, Prime, Trackside and local services QTV and Whitestone City Music. The analogue switch-off would however bring a further bureaucratic problem to the station, as the long-term licence was due November 2013 and it had to pay a sum of between NZ$12,000 and NZ$13,000 to continue operating. Moreover, the government was reportedly blocking the station from obtaining a NZ$70,000 grant to update its equipment post-switchover. This point would be argued in the next two to three months. This was negotiated successfully; at midnight on 28 April 2013, 45 South shut down its analogue signal and, by using spare parts of the former transmitter, hoped to either by maintaining its power (10 kilowatts) or increasing its range.

The station quietly closed down in December 2024. This was posted onto the channel's Facebook account on 14 February 2026. This stemmed from a hunt for volunteers, two of which were found but, according to a comment from a station staff, "nothing eventuated".
