= Wellington Television =

- Country: New Zealand
- Broadcast area: Wellington

Programming
- Language: English
- Picture format: 576i PAL colour

History
- Launched: 3 November 2000
- Closed: 15 November 2002

Wellington Television (or Wellington TV) was a local, volunteer-run television station in Wellington. It existed for two years from 2000 to 2002. It shut down due to lack of funds.

== History ==
The idea for a local television station for Wellington stemmed from the closure of TVNZ's Horizon Pacific Television network in 1997, which included Capital City Television. These stations shut down on 30 June 1997, being replaced by an MTV feed. A group of former Capital City staff, led by Jim Cross, announced to the press that their station could be operational by November. By late September, a separate bid by Channel Seven began; it eyed a frequency reserved for non-commercial broadcasting. Channel Seven was originally expected to be on air in February 1998 and then April 1999 and 1 June 1999.

Wellington Television was operational in 2000. As of June 2002, it operated on a 24-hour schedule, however the only publication providing its listings, TV Week, only provided a seven-hour sample. During the two-year period it was on air, it produced over 300 programmes. As of March 2002, an estimated 53,000 viewers were receiving the channel.

The channel's chief executive David Brown announced on 11 November 2002 that it would shut down on 15 November, justifying the closure on the lack of a funding allocation for it. Mayor Kerry Prendergast noticed that it was a disappointment, and that the station "filled a real need in Wellington".
