= Northern Television (New Zealand) =

New Zealand production company

Northern Television was a New Zealand production company. It was also the first private company to broadcast legally on New Zealand television by leasing airtime on the existing channels.

== History ==
In the early years of national television, TVNZ was responsible for the television monopoly which it had inherited from the NZBC.

On 11 December 1980, publishing company Wilson & Horton won a bid for a third television channel; this was one of the three regional television licences granted to the newspaper industry, the other two being Central Television (for the lower North Island) and Southern Television (for the South Island). Technical training from Australia was brought in to study transmission and frequency issues to enable its broadcasts. NTV accepted the idea of leasing airtime to the BCNZ, but such leases could not detract the plan to launch the third channel.

At the end of January 1981, the company was recruiting personnel to design its Auckland studios. The Panorama Road facilities in the Auckland suburb of Mount Wellington were meant to be the most technologically advanced in the country at the time and it was planning an early morning programme using unused TV2 airtime. The Labour Party spokesman for broadcasting J. J. Terris was concerned by the decision.

Other programmes announced besides the breakfast show included game shows and similar cheap programming, preferably in the 9am to 2pm slots on weekdays and 9am to 12 noon on weekends, which were of low priority for TVNZ.

On 1 June 1981, NTV received a 31-hour tender to broadcast its programmes on the TV2 network. Construction work for its NZ$5.5 million studio complex continued in August.

Northern Television was authorised on 11 February 1982 to broadcast one hour of programming per day on TV One, from 11am to 12 noon. The programme, Good Morning! (originally Good Morning New Zealand), was set to launch in May, while NZ$850,000 had been spend on independent productions. TVNZ would be responsible for the programme and the playout due to existing BCNZ rules covering broadcasting standards while NTV would produce and package the material. Tina Grenville was going to be its presenter.

The Northern Television studio complex was opened by PM Muldoon on 16 April 1982, costing NZ$8 million. The company was limited to broadcast on TV One for five hours a week (one hour a day). On 5 May, an emergency meeting was held at the TVNZ premises in Auckland to show their opposition to Good Morning and restricted its promotional material. It was later announced that the programme would debut on 21 June, which included advertising on Fridays (which TV One forbade). TVNZ was planning to amend the law to enable such advertisements, which were provided by NTV. The company renewed its bid for a private channel at the end of May.

On 17 June 1982, ahead of the premiere of Good Morning!, NTV was allowed to show advertisements on Friday mornings. The Public Service Association submitted an attempted bid to block the launch of its television operations. An agreement was reached on 18 June.

The first edition of Good Morning! aired on the scheduled 21 June 1982 date, replacing foreign-made cooking, comedy and fitness shows. Its first edition was criticised by the press due to a lack of quality and coordination. The programme was viewed by 2% of the national population on average, per monthly BCNZ surveys. By December, Tina Grenville resigned, with her last live appearance being on 17 December, yet pre-recorded interviews featuring her were screened until the end of the month. The exit was not related with the low ratings Good Morning! received; TVNZ renewed the programme for 1983.

With a new season of Good Morning! scheduled to start on 21 March 1983, the company had not found a suitable replacement by January due to a lack of contracts. A replacement, Heather Lindsay, was selected in February. NTV co-operated with TBS for the production of a programme related to the Adidas City of Christchurch International Marathon in May 1983.

On 21 May 1983, NTV announced that from 17 June, 11AM (formerly Good Morning!) would end. The company received applications for a new breakfast programme from August. It and City Television withdrew their bids in July due to the high cost of the tender. Without its slot on TV One, NTV lobbied for the creation of its own television channel, while withdrawing from its lease time application.

In September 1983, NTV suggested the creation of a UHF channel (the existing TVNZ channels operated on the VHF band). The possibility of delivering stereo broadcasts was on the cards.

In May 1987, the production company was acquired by the Deco Group while its Panorama Park facilities were acquired by Sky Network Television.
