= Sue Wells =

New Zealand media personality and politician (born 1965)

Sue Wells (born 29 September 1965) is a media personality and former city councillor in Christchurch, New Zealand.

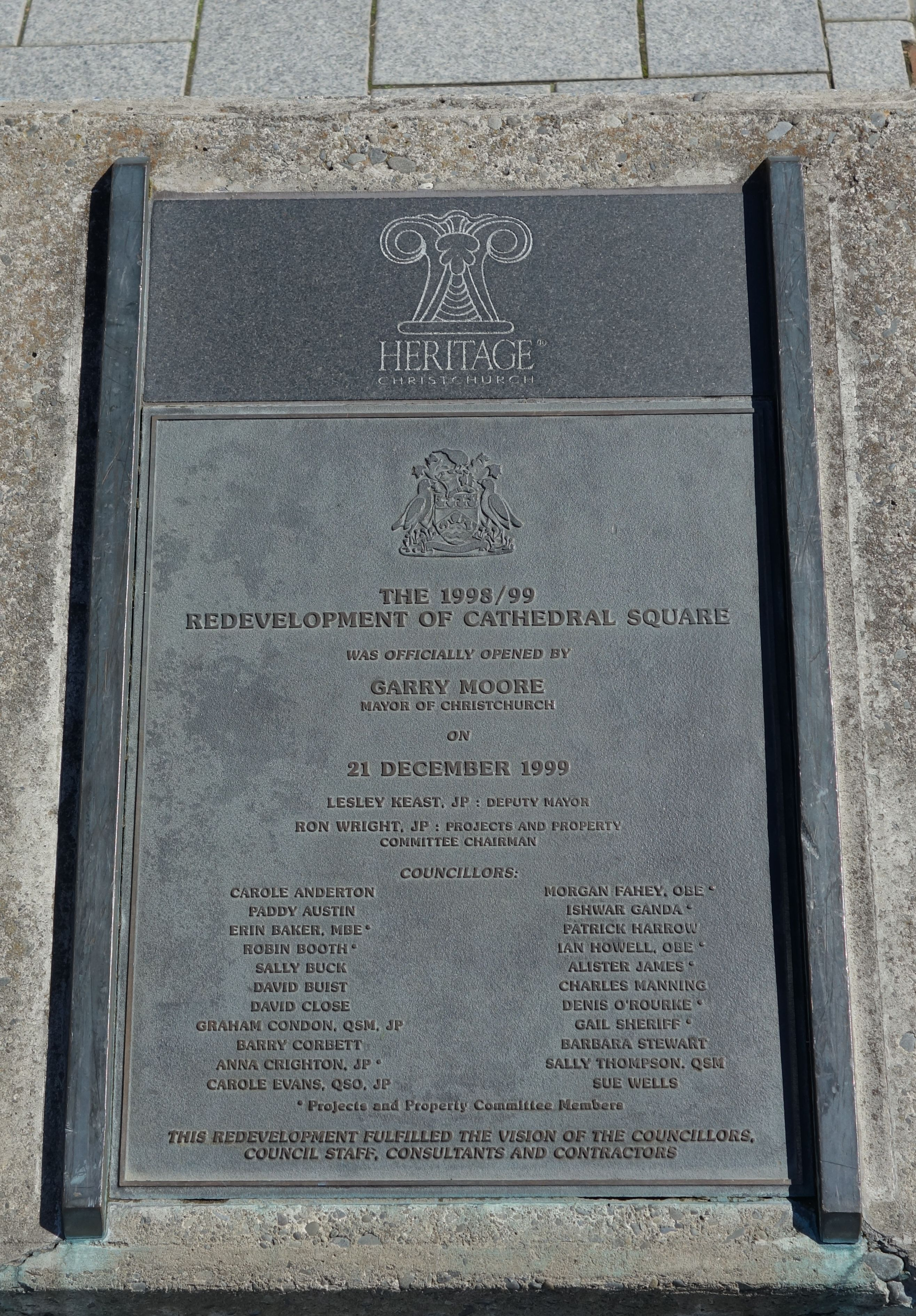
Plaque commemorating the redevelopment of Cathedral Square in 1998/99, with Wells listed as one of the councillors

Wells received her education at Heaton Intermediate (1976–1977) and Christchurch Girls' High School (1978–1982). Wells is the author of a novel called Nearly Twelve and appears on The Panel, a discussion programme on Radio New Zealand. She is a presenter on Canterbury Television, as host of her program, Susan Sells. She was previously a presenter for radio station Classic Hits 98FM. On the 24 May 2007 edition of The Panel, she requested her own Wikipedia page be made to complement those of host Jim Mora and fellow panel member Clive Matthew-Wilson. The page was up before the end of the programme.

She was first elected onto the Shirley-Papanui community board in 1995. In 1998 and 2001, she was a city councillor in the Heathcote ward. After the numbers of city councillors were reduced from 24 to 12 and the number of wards reduced accordingly, she successfully stood in the Spreydon-Heathcote ward in the 2004, 2007, and 2010. Early in 2012, she called on the government to replace the Christchurch City Councillors with commissioners after they had become dysfunctional, a call that was rejected by the Minister for Local Government, Nick Smith.

She announced early in 2013 that she would stand for a sixth term. A strong supporter of mayor Bob Parker, she changed her mind only when nominations were due in August 2013, after Parker had withdrawn from the mayoralty race. Wells was the chair of the city council's planning committee, and as such, she was implicated in the 2013 debacle where the city council was stripped of its authority to issue building consents. Wells denied that the affair played any significant role in her not standing in the 2013 election. Barry Corbett, with whom she hosted radio shows and who also first became a city councillor in 1998, retired at the same election. Since the council ward amalgamation in 2004, Corbett and Wells had run their election campaigns for the Spreydon-Heathcote ward as a team.
