= MTV Full Tank =

- Created by: MTV Australia - Ean Thorley (EP), Gavin Jarratt, Tim Thatcher, Dean Tochini
- Starring: Australia: Maz Compton; Jason Dundas; Lyndsey Rodrigues; Nathan Sapsford; Darren McMullen; New Zealand: Phil Bostwick; Amber Peebles; Geoffrey Bell
- Country of origin: Australia

Production
- Producers: Gavin Jarratt, Tim Thatcher, Dean Tochini
- Running time: 60 minutes

Original release
- Network: MTV Australia
- Release: 2005 – present

MTV Full Tank is a music, culture and travel show that was developed in Australia by MTV producers Gavin Jarratt and Tim Thatcher with Ean Thorley (Executive Producer). Casing the many events and lifestyles of states around Australia. The show has so far travelled around all of Australia.

== Overseas ==
MTV Full Tank (Australia) has also ventured to Tokyo, Japan for the Fuji Rock Festival and USA for South By South West .

== International Versions ==
=== New Zealand ===
When Viacom announced that MTV would launch a new channel in New Zealand MTV Full Tank became one of the first original programmes to air on the channel taking viewers around the country, its first destination being North Island.

== Destinations ==
=== Australia ===
- Alice Springs
- Brisbane
- Byron Bay
- Casino
- Gold Coast
- Goulburn
- Melbourne
- Nimbin
- Sunshine Coast
- Sydney
  - Overseas
- Tokyo, Japan
- Austin, TX. USA

=== New Zealand ===
- Aotearoa
- North Island
