= Television Hawke's Bay =

- Country: New Zealand

Programming
- Picture format: 576i 16:9 (anamorphic)

Ownership
- Owner: Sawyer Television Ltd

History
- Launched: 1994
- Former names: Channel 51

Links
- Website: tvhb.co.nz

Availability

Terrestrial
- Mnt. Threave (DVB): 6001 @ 27 (522 MHz)
- Freeview (Virtual): 48
- Mnt. Threave (PAL-G until 2012): 51 (711.25 MHz)

Television Hawke's Bay (TVHB) is a regional television station based in Napier, Hawke's Bay, New Zealand.

TVHB is operated by Sawyer Television Ltd which also runs a news and current affairs bureau in Napier, makes TV commercials and is a provider of various services to broadcasting agencies.

TVHB is now broadcasting on virtual channel 48 via DVB-T in the Hawke's Bay.
