= Family Television Network =

- Country: New Zealand
- Headquarters: Warkworth

Programming
- Language: English

Ownership
- Owner: Family Television Network Trust

History
- Launched: 1996
- Closed: 2012

The Family Television Network (FTN or Family TV) was a New Zealand network of regional television stations, found largely on the North Island, which offered a family-friendly alternative to the programming seen on the larger commercial television networks. It was established in 1996 and defunct by the late 2000s.

== History ==
The Family Television Network Trust, a Christian group owned by Lifeway Ministries Trust, was established in mid-1996 in the Warkworth suburb of Auckland. Its philosophy was to "provide wholesome family entertainment and information", while evading programmes that showed "the ugly side of society", as well as providing more information for local communities. Trevor Yaxley was the trust's director. Although the channel was owned by a Christian trust, religious programming only made up 5 to 7% of the weekly programming, and mostly on Sundays. As of early August 1996, it was expected to have its national operations base in Warkworth, where a television station was already built, and had two UHF licenses plus cable carriage status. That year, it installed its first transmitter to cover the metro Auckland area.

In April 1997, it announced its intent to lease two hours to Pounamu Television, created mostly by former Aotearoa Television Network staff, for a breakfast show. Pounamu was formed in the wake of a scandal involving politician Tuku Morgan using public funds to buy an NZ$89 pair of underpants at Politiks in Newmarket earlier in the year. FTN in July 1997 was also planned to launch a second station in Christchurch (Canterbury Family Television Network or CFTN), but was faced with legal problems with Lifeway in Auckland. The channel was set to operate on Cry TV's former frequency, but the liquidator didn't sell its frequency or assets. CFTN was on air on 14 July and was reported by the local press to still be on air on the following evening. All programming was replaced on 17 July by a live fish cam, which Cry TV aired after closedown. The issue was solved by September when it was conducting new tests; CFTN carried a local programme, Marketplace, which used to air on another channel. A full launch for the local station was set for 1 October, that month, all of its equipment, which was "network-quality", was expected to arrive. With its full launch, CFTN carried Welcome to Canterbury, a tourism programme formerly seen on Canterbury Television, which shut down (though later resumed) following the closure of Horizon Pacific Television (CTV was private but sided with TVNZ's ill-fated local network). On 23 October, it was agreed that CFTN would move to UHF channel 44 and merge with CTV, creating CTV Family Television Network.

In March 1998, FTN acquired 50% of the shares of CRT Southland, operator of Mercury TV in Invercargill, but sold them in November. In 2000, CFTN withdrew from CTV, withdrawing FTN from the South Island.

FTN later retreated from larger urban centres and refocused on smaller areas. A new station opened in Matamata, Waikato in January 2001. The Waikato station obtained a funding boost in May 2005. In April 2006, FTN planned the launch of a new Family TV-branded station for the Bay of Plenty, initially due to launch in December. The new Tauranga station opened in February 2008.

FTN supported the Northern Soccer League from 2010 to 2012. It is unknown when FTN ceased its operations.
