= Wairarapa TV =

Television station in New Zealand

- Country: New Zealand
- Broadcast area: Wairarapa

Programming
- Picture format: 576i 16:9

History
- Launched: 24 October 2016

Links
- Website: wairarapatv.co.nz

Availability

Terrestrial
- Freeview (Virtual): 41

Wairarapa TV is a television station in New Zealand that transmits in the Wairarapa area of the North Island.

Wairarapa TV began transmitting in the Wairarapa on 24 October 2016. The channel is a Freeview regional channel covering Masterton, Carterton, Greytown, Featherston and Martinborough.

The channel broadcasts on Freeview Channel 41 from Popoiti Hill in Carterton. It broadcasts more than 50% locally generated television content via its partner More FM. The channel is funded and supported by Noise Productions Ltd, Trust House Ltd, The Wairarapa Times-Age, Media Works Wairarapa and Wairarapa Bush Rugby.

Wairarapa TV has no permanent staff and is fully automated using technology developed by founder Toby Mills. In 2018, Wairarapa TV signed a technology and content sharing agreement with Changchun Television in China.

In 2018, with the demolition of the Empire Lodge, the previous home of Arrow FM, Wairarapa TV moved into a new shared premises with Arrow FM at Radio House in Masterton.
