= Amber Peebles =

New Zealand TV host and beauty pageant titleholder

Amber Jean Peebles (born in 1983 in Wellington, New Zealand) is a New Zealand TV host and beauty pageant titleholder who won Miss World New Zealand 2004. She competed at Miss International 2003 and Miss World 2004.

Peebles attended Howick College. After college she studied fashion design and makeup artistry. She won the Miss World NZ title in 2003 and was a contestant for the 2003 Miss International and 2004 Miss World competitions.

Her broadcasting career began on radio at The Edge and on television for TV3 where she was a correspondent on its Melbourne Cup coverage. in 2006 Amber became the Host of MTV NZ, which took her around the world interviewing musicians and celebrities alike for four years. In 2010, she became a host of Red Bull Chronicles on Sky Sport 1. Amber was frequently featured on the Paul Henry Show's panel and is currently the host of Sky TV's 'All Access', a job that has her travelling and interviewing actors about upcoming projects.

Peebles is also an active Voice Over artist.

From 2011 to 2012 she hosted the morning show for More FM with Marc Ellis and Stu Tolin.

She spent 2014–2017 as the Fashion Editor at large for Remix Magazine; she is the New Zealand ambassador for Westfield Group and American Express, and is a Moet ambassador.

== Personal life ==
Peebles is married to television presenter Brooke Howard-Smith.

== See also ==
- List of New Zealand television personalities
