= Cue TV =

Defunct TV channel and production company based in Invercargill,

CUE TV
- Country: New Zealand
- Headquarters: Invercargill

Programming
- Language: English

History
- Launched: 31 October 1996
- Closed: 10 April 2015

Cue TV was a TV channel and production company based in Invercargill, New Zealand. It operated a full local service until 10 April 2015; from 2003 until its closure, it was also available on Sky.

== History ==
Cue TV, a local television channel based in Invercargill that aimed at serving the Southland Region, was started in October 1996 as Mercury TV. It was operated by CRT Southland. From March to November 1998, 50% of its shares were held by the Family Television Network. After FTN sold its shares, CRT only had 10%. It rebranded to Southland TV in 2003. In retrospect, owner Tom Conroy considered the rebrand to be a mistake, saying that the company was trying to attract an audience and advertisers from across the country, and naming it "Southland" would not help with that. On 1 March 2007 the channel was rebranded again to Cue TV. Starting in 2003, a lot of the channel's programmes were produced by the Southern Institute of Technology, for the distance learning SIT2LRN programme.

After working for Mobil, Tom Conroy became the manager of Mercury TV and then in 2002 he bought the company from the owners in Britain. In 2003 the channel was converted from analogue to digital and joined Sky TV. In 2009 Cue TV became the 10th channel to join the free digital television platform Freeview. In 2012 Invercargill mayor Tim Shadbolt and Conroy on Cue TV broke the Guinness World Record for the longest TV interview—26 hours.

In 2014 Cue TV revived the New Zealand version of television programme University Challenge after it had not been produced for 25 years. The TV channel stopped broadcasting on 10 April 2015, moving the company to just a production company and a company that manages venues and event bookings.
