= Trick It Out =

- Presented by: RJ de Vera; Becky and Jessie O'Donohue
- Narrated by: Sway Calloway

Original release
- Network: MTV2

Trick It Out: MTV's Tuner Challenge is an MTV reality television show focusing on automobile modification. The show aired primarily on MTV2 and is hosted by award-winning car tuner, RJ de Vera, and narrated by MTV news personality, Sway Calloway. It was directed by Zosimo Maximo.

The show is a tournament-style competition to find out who is the "most creative, resourceful, and ingenious Tuner in the nation". Each crew of four Tuners from rival car modification shops in Southern California gets a similar car to start with, 14 days, and $15,000 to do their very best cosmetic work. In the end, the teams are judged by de Vera on criteria such as craftsmanship, creativity, and the ability to have a theme. The winning crew gets to go home with their car, as well as the car of the losing team.

Each episode of the 30-minute show would follow the two teams as they took their cars from the planning stage to completion. Various situations, both positive and negative, would be highlighted, such as bad paint jobs, incomplete features, and insight into the creation of different features for the cars.

The tournament featured 8 teams from car modification shops in Southern California. Each round offered different rules for the contestants to follow.

- Round one, the quarterfinals, allowed teams to choose their own themes for their cars.
- Round two, the semifinals, had de Vera choose the theme for each contest.
  - In episode one of the semifinals, de Vera had the teams stick to a "secret agent" theme.
  - In episode two of the semifinals, de Vera had the teams stick to an "ultimate gaming" theme.
- Round three, the finals, de Vera gave the teams new cars, both the 2006 Honda Civic EX Coupe, and gave them the theme of "car of the future".

== Season 2 ==
Season 2 began airing on July 22, 2007. With the second season of Trick It Out, MTV brought on several changes. Gone was Sway as the host, replaced by former American Idol contestant Becky O'Donohue, as well as her twin sister, Jessie. Also, the time that teams get to work on the cars has been reduced from 14 days to 10. Also, round one cars are given themes by de Vera, rather than allowing teams to choose their theme. The teams also had to disclose their plans to Jessie while actually working on the projects.
