= Horizon Pacific Television =

- Country: New Zealand
- Broadcast area: New Zealand
- Headquarters: Auckland, New Zealand

Programming
- Picture format: 4:3

Ownership
- Owner: Television New Zealand, Ltd.
- Sister channels: TV One; TV2

History
- Launched: 19 March 1995; 31 years ago
- Closed: June 30, 1997

Horizon Pacific Television was a network of four regional television stations operated by Television New Zealand from 1995 to 1997, with services in Auckland, Hamilton, Wellington and Dunedin on the UHF band. The service carried a mix of local programmes and simulcasts of BBC World. It was later shut down and replaced by a time-shifted feed of MTV Europe with local inserts.

== History ==
Horizon Pacific International was established in Auckland in 1992 by Jeff Bennet and Trevor Egerton. It planned to use the TVNZ-owned BCL network. The group sought to establish five television stations at the cost of NZ$12 million. It envisioned five stations, in Wellington, Dunedin, Auckland, Hamilton and Palmerston North, due to be on air by March 1994. In order to break even, the planned Auckland station would capture 1% of the viewing audience.

In 1994, the plan was downsized to just four stations, scrapping the Palmerston North station, and, in August, it appointed each station's managers: Wilson Owen (Auckland), Alister Sherman (Wellington), Michael Kelly (Hamilton) and Bevan Rickaby (Dunedin). The network claimed a potential audience of 1.3 million. It planned to, upon establishment in early 1995, enabling TVNZ to sell the stations to local interests. One third of its programming was local; the rest was acquired. Expansion plans were also a possibility, though it would exclude Christchurch, where TVNZ had close ties with Canterbury Television.

Horizon Pacific Television started on 19 March 1995 (Sunday) at 3pm as part of a diversification of TVNZ's business units post-deregulation. It was created following criticisms regarding the lack of regional programming on TVNZ's channels, and competed against established local services such as Max TV, Mainland Television and Eastland Television.

The network was composed of the following stations:

- ATV (Auckland)
- Coast to Coast (Hamilton)
- Capital City Television (Wellington)
- Southern Television (Dunedin)

These stations were joined by a fifth, Christchurch's Canterbury Television, which was an independent television station, in November 1995.

In April 1996, the network's audience share doubled to 4,3%. In June, 25 staff were made redundant, five of which in Wellington. On 1 September 1996, the network started relaying One News live from TV One in an attempt to integrate the group into TVNZ.

In 1997, Television New Zealand announced that it was going to withdraw the operations of Horizon Pacific due to a lack of financial sustainability to continue. One of the proposals was to enable a Māori language service for primetime, as well as other niche public service offerings, similar to Australia's SBS. The plan was strongly opposed by ethnic Māori because they weren't formally advised to have airtime there. Early in June, TV3 confirmed that the network was set to close in late June, which TVNZ denied.

TVNZ replaced it with MTV, which was seen as a more "competitive" alternative. MTV would eventually become unprofitable and shut down less than a year later.

The shutdown led to redundancies at TVNZ, some of which were compensated for gaining new jobs at TVNZ's news and current affairs division.

== Programming ==
At launch, Horizon Pacific carried news bulletins from BBC World, documentaries, drama series (such as Hill Street Blues), lifestyle and musical programming, as well as local programmes. From its launch day, BBC World began being carried overnight on TV One instead of closing down. There was also National Business Review Weekly, produced in association with the National Business Review on Sunday nights.

Although the channel pledged "regional public service television", critics of the service called the supposed statement of the service as an "oxymoron" due to the abundance of foreign content. In 1995, Capital Television of Wellington pre-empted some national programmes.

The network unveiled a new line-up on 23 January 1996, with the appointment of Maureen Sinton, formerly of TV One, as its new director of programming. Its news bulletins were expanded to a full hour, while the quantity of imported material, especially movies and mini-series, fell, with the hope of using the allotted time for these items for better quality productions. Sundays were given for arts programming, such as The South Bank Show.

In January 1996, Southern Television rejected the airing of Express Report, New Zealand's first gay and lesbian lifestyle programme, a move touted by its manager Bevan Rickerby as it could lead to concerns that it wouldn't be well-received by viewers and would jeopardise its advertising revenue. Dunedin mayor Sukhi Turner criticised the ban, as she thought Dunedin was stuck in the past, when, in reality, by then, it was an open-minded city. The other stations in the network aired it in a 10pm timeslot.

With the cuts made at Horizon Pacific in June 1996, the local news bulletins reverted to the previous half-hour format from 1 July, moving from 7pm to 5:30pm. The new timeslot made it unable to compete with Holmes on TV One and Shortland Street on TV2. In July, it started broadcasting alternative British material for the youth such as Crapston Villas and Eurotrash. Maureen Sinton removed 60 Minutes repeats as it moved to TV One; the repeats, according to her, make sense because it aired on TV2. In addition to the inclusion of One News relays, from September 1996, the line-up added repeated British comedy series, while the gay programme Express Report was renamed Out There and added a new segment, Lesbian Cooking.

Capital Television aired The Hellenic Time in early 1997, produced by the local Greek community and with material from the Hellenic Broadcasting Corporation. Said community showed their concern for moving it to a Friday midnight slot. After five months, the regional news services were restored in February 1997; Capital's service included a segment where viewers had their say on current topics. Out There was axed, with its last episode airing on 15 April 1997, a decision criticised by gay and lesbian groups.

After closing, its imported output moved to TV One.
