= Cry TV =

Former New Zealand music television channel

Cry TV was a regional music television station broadcast in Christchurch, New Zealand, between 1993 and 1997.

It broadcast on UHF channel 56 using a 100 Watt transmitter from a shed on Marleys Hill, on the Port Hills, near the Sugarloaf Transmitter. It was started by Christian Birch and Chris Clarkson. Test transmissions consisted of a camera looking at an aquarium 24 hours a day for approximately 1 month during July and August 1993. When the station started regular transmissions, the aquarium was aired during its downtime.

The channel was notable for the launch of the careers of Petra Bagust and Jason Fa'afoi. Cry TV closed in April 1997, two months before TVNZ launched MTV.

The frequency was acquired by the Family Television Network who set up a local franchise on 14 July 1997. It aired its programming for three days because Cry TV's liquidator did not sell its frequency and assets to CFTN. After these events, CFTN halted all programming on its frequency and was replaced by its fish cam on 17 July. The frequency was taken over by religious station Freedom TV on 22 December.
