= Max TV =

Max TV was a New Zealand music channel available free to air on UHF channel 49 in Auckland, broadcasting from 28 October 1993 to 3 December 1997.

== History ==
Reforms in the New Zealand television landscape started in 1989, enabling the private sector to control television channels. Radio DJ Kevin Black, and Stereo FM director Allan Rutledge set a tender for a UHF music channel. The channel, named Much Music, collapsed in 1991, with the receiver selling the frequency. Auckland businessman Geoff Thorpe gained the rights to the frequency at a bargain price, after discussions with Black.

When Max TV began transmission it was known as Max: The Music Channel. The channel was jointly owned and operated by Aztel Holdings (consisting of Kevin Black, who owned the frequency licence, and his partner Jeff Thorpe) and On-Line Productions, a video production house. Broadcasts started on 28 October 1993 from the facilities of production company Vidcom.

In April 1996 its transmission hours grew to a full 24/7 service.

Since the channel only had UHF coverage, Max TV actively promoted the installation of UHF aerials, at a time when penetration of such aerials was limited primarily to subscribers of Sky's UHF service.

On 3 December 1997, the channel closed.
