= 2011 in New Zealand television =

This is a list of New Zealand television events and premieres that occurred in 2011, the 52nd year of continuous operation of television in New Zealand.

== Events ==
- 6 February – Four begins airing. This network focuses on programming for children, with shows such as Sesame Street, Bob the Builder, Thomas and Friends, Peppa Pig, Barney & Friends and several Nickelodeon television shows including original Nicktoons such as Rugrats, Rocko's Modern Life, The Fairly OddParents!, Invader Zim, Hey Arnold!, and SpongeBob SquarePants during the day and a range of programmes aimed at audiences aged 18 to 49 in the evenings. The first programme to air on Four was The Simpsons episode Elementary School Musical.
- 7 February – New Zealand fantasy comedy-drama television series The Almighty Johnsons begins on TV3.
- 28 February – TVNZ 6 closes down. Some TVNZ 6 content, including Kidzone and Shortland Street: From the Beginning, are moved to sister channels TVNZ 7, TVNZ Heartland and TVNZ Kidzone24.
- 13 March – TVNZ U, a social channel aimed at 15 to 24 year olds, is launched.

== Premieres ==
=== Domestic series ===
Domestic television series premieres on New Zealand television in 2011
Programme	Original airdate	Network	Ref
The Almighty Johnsons	7 February	TV3	
Bigger, Better, Faster, Stronger	7 February	TV3	
Drew and Shannon Live	7 February	Four	
Four Live	7 February	Four	
Firstline	7 March	TV3	
Mana Mamau	7 July	Māori Television	
Nothing Trivial	20 July	TV One	
U Live	13 March	U	
Underbelly NZ: Land of the Long Green Cloud	17 August	TV3	

=== International series ===
International television series premieres on New Zealand television in 2011
Programme	Original airdate	Network	Country of origin	Ref
Power Rangers Samurai	2 July	Nickelodeon	United States	
Bananas in Pyjamas (2011)	July 2011	Four	Australia	
The Looney Tunes Show	2011	TV2	United States	
Little Charley Bear	2011	TVNZ Kidzone 24	United Kingdom	

=== Telemovies and miniseries ===
Domestic television telemovie and miniseries premieres on New Zealand television in 2011
Programme	Original airdate	Network	Ref

=== Documentaries ===
Domestic television documentary premieres on New Zealand television in 2011
Programme	Original airdate(s)	Network	Ref

=== Specials ===
Domestic television special premieres on New Zealand television in 2011
Programme	Original airdate(s)	Network(s)	Ref

== Programming changes ==
=== Programmes changing networks ===
Criterion for inclusion in the following list is that New Zealand premiere episodes will air in New Zealand for the first time on the new network. This includes when a programme is moved from a free-to-air network's primary channel to a digital multi-channel, as well as when a programme moves between subscription television channels – provided the preceding criterion is met. Ended television series which change networks for repeat broadcasts are not included in the list.

Domestic television series which changed network affiliation in 2011
Programme	Date	New network	Previous network	Ref

International television programmes which changed channel/network in 2011
Programme	Date	New network	Previous network	Country of origin	Ref
The Simpsons	6 February	Four	TV3	United States	
The Wild Thornberrys	7 February	Four	TV2	United States	
Barney & Friends	7 February	Four	TV3	United States	
Thomas and Friends	7 February	Four	TV3	United Kingdom	
As Told by Ginger	7 February	Four	TV2	United States	
The X's	7 February	Four	TV3	United States	
El Tigre: The Adventures of Manny Rivera	7 February	Four	TV3	United States	
Sesame Street	7 February	Four	TV3	United States	
The Wiggles Show	7 February	Four	TV3	Australia	
Hey Arnold!	7 February	Four	TV3	United States	
Rugrats	7 February	Four	TV3	United States	
Curious George	7 February	Four	TV3	United States	

=== Free-to-air premieres ===
This is a list of programmes which made their premiere on New Zealand free-to-air television that had previously premiered on New Zealand subscription television. Programmes may still air on the original subscription television network.

Programme	Date	Free-to-air network	Subscription network(s)	Country of origin	Ref

=== Subscription premieres ===
This is a list of programmes which made their premiere on New Zealand subscription television that had previously premiered on New Zealand free-to-air television. Programmes may still air on the original free-to-air television network.

International television series that premiered on New Zealand free-to-air television in 2011
Programme	Date	Free-to-air network	Subscription network(s)	Country of origin	Ref

=== Programmes returning in 2011 ===
Returning programmes on New Zealand television in 2011
Programme	Return date	Network	Original run	Ref

=== Milestone episodes in 2011 ===
Domestic television series which have reached a milestone in 2011
Show	Network	Episode #	Episode title	Episode air date	Source

=== Programmes ending in 2011 ===
Domestic programmes ending on New Zealand television in 2011
Programme	End date	Network	Start date	Ref

== Channels ==
Launches:

- 1 March: Sky Arena

== Deaths ==
Date	Name	Age	Notability	Source
