= TVNZ Sport Extra =

New Zealand television channel

- Country: New Zealand

Programming
- Picture format: 576i 16:9 (SDTV)

Ownership
- Owner: TVNZ
- Sister channels: TV One, TV2, TVNZ 6, TVNZ 7, TVNZ Heartland

History
- Launched: June 2007
- Former names: Colloquially: 'V8's Channel'

Links
- Website: Official Site

Availability

Terrestrial
- Freeview|HD: Channel 020

TVNZ Sport Extra was a temporary sports television station in New Zealand, operated by TVNZ. Broadcasting on channel 20 on Freeview, it showed live and delayed free-to-air coverage of selected events. Eric Kearley, TVNZ's Digital Launch Manager, has stated there was no further plans for this channel until the 2008 Summer Olympics.

== Programming ==
Sport Extra had originally launched to show the V8 Supercars Series live. TVNZ however lost the rights to this at the end of the 2007 season to TV3.

=== 2007 ===
- V8 Supercars Series (Live)
- FIFA Under-20 World Cup (Delayed)
- AFC Asian Cup (Live)

=== 2008 ===
- 2008 Beijing Olympics

=== 2009 ===
- ASB Classic & Heineken Open (live, extended coverage)
- Louis Vuitton Pacific Series (live coverage and highlights)
- FA Cup (Semi-final, and final replays and highlights)
- IRB International Rugby Board Junior Cup
- Confederations Cup (New Zealands games and Final replay)
- Wimbledon World Tennis tournaments held in London

== Channel Future ==
The broadcast of TVNZ Sport Extra was terminated on NZST 10:00pm, 1 August 2009 to allow for increased capacity across other TVNZ digital channels, however the 2009 global recession has been blamed for the lack of resources maintained by TVNZ. TVNZ later launched a similar channel, TVNZ Pop-up in 2015. For the 2018 Commonwealth Games, TVNZ launched TVNZ Games Extra and TVNZ Games Online.

== Sister Channels ==
TVNZ Sport Extra was one of the six channels owned and operated by TVNZ. It was also the only TVNZ channel available exclusively on the Freeview platform.

- TV One
- TV2
- TVNZ 6 (closed, became TVNZ U (closed), now TV2 + 1)
- TVNZ 7 (Closed, became TV One Plus 1 (shifted), now TV One + 1)
- TVNZ Heartland (now defunct)
- TVNZ Kidzone24 (now defunct)
