= Goodnight Kiwi =

Animated short seen on Television New Zealand

The Goodnight Kiwi is an animated short which aired during closedown on Television New Zealand channels. The Goodnight Kiwi features two characters: the eponymous Goodnight Kiwi (later also called TV Kiwi), and his companion, simply known as The Cat. The animation was introduced in 1975 on TV2, and used on South Pacific Television between 1976 and 1980. Between 1980 and 19 October 1994, the animation was screened again on TV2. This animation returned on 6 September 2007 for use on TVNZ 6 when the channel ended transmission at midnight. TVNZ U also used the Goodnight Kiwi at midnight before overnight service.

The short was animated by Sam Harvey (1923–2014), with music arrangement by Bernie Allen and sound by Gary Potts. The name Goodnight Kiwi was in use as early as 1978, when it appeared in South Pacific Television's listings.

== History ==
=== TV2/South Pacific Televison era (1975-1980) ===
Three different clips have been used through time:

The first version of the clip was used when TV2 first signed off in 1975. In this version, Kiwi was a director. The cartoon began with Kiwi yawning in the director's chair. Kiwi wakes up the cat, while a few of broadcasting equipment move away. Kiwi then goes to the back of the studio, cuts the power and turns on the outside lights. Then Kiwi puts the empty bottle and the cat outside, but without it knowing the cat goes outside again while Kiwi is waving to the audience. Following this, Kiwi exits the studio, pulling down a shade revealing "GOODNIGHT FROM TV2". This version was thought to only exist in the form of small clips until TVNZ released it online for public viewing on 15 September 2016.

The second version of the Goodnight Kiwi clip was used by South Pacific Television somewhere between 1976 and 1980 and saw Kiwi living in a television camera (his cat had disappeared). After dusting his camera, throwing a blanket on top of it, winking at the audience, and turning out the lights, Kiwi would close the side flaps on the camera and then the South Pacific Television logo (reading "GOOD NIGHT FROM SOUTH PACIFIC TELEVISION") would appear as the music faded out. This version was also thought to only exist in the form of small clips until TVNZ released this version to their YouTube channel on 4 November 2019. During transmission breakdowns, a still picture of the Goodnight Kiwi was often used, in poses including one of sweeping the floor and accidentally smashing one of the television monitors with a broom, or accidentally cutting a wire.

=== TVNZ era (1980-1994) ===
When TVNZ was set to take over South Pacific Television, a new animation was already in production in October 1979. Chris Bourn, head of presentation at TV One, noted that the new version would be shared by the two channels. The new version was referred by TVNZ staff as a "fourth-generation kiwi, slightly older and fatter" than his predecessor.

The third iteration appeared in 1980 and aired on both channels until 1989. The one-minute-long animation begins with Goodnight Kiwi and the Cat in the master control room. Kiwi shuts down the screens and starts an audio cassette playing an instrumental arrangement of the lullaby "Hine E Hine" by Fanny Howie, this is accompanied by a continuity announcer bidding goodnight to viewers, Kiwi walks through the studio while Cat jumps and pulls faces into a camera. Kiwi turns out the lights, puts an empty bottle on the porch and locks the door, while the cat heads upstairs to the studio roof. Kiwi follows and rides an elevator (presumably just after it had been used by the cat) to the top of a transmission mast. At the top, Kiwi covers himself in blankets (in which the cat was already curled up) and goes to sleep in a satellite dish with the Cat sitting on his stomach, under a night sky featuring a crescent moon and the sparkling stars of the Southern Cross. The animation closes with the words: "Goodnight from TELEVISION NEW ZEALAND".

On 2 September 1980, viewers in parts of the South Island received an unexpected transmission following Goodnight Kiwi on TV2. The footage showed a woman removing her bra and panties with the assistance of a male companion. TVNZ denied that the transmission originated from its facilities, suggesting that unusual atmospheric conditions had allowed an Australian television signal to be received in New Zealand.

In 1989, TVNZ planned to turn the Goodnight Kiwi into a "megastar", without Americanising the character. This included a children's series as well as appearance in the 1990 Commonwealth Games telecasts and merchandising. The cat would also change his appearance. The puppet series Country Kiwi and the Cool City Cat, inspired by the Kiwi and Cat, first aired on TV2 in December.

There was a slight variation of the ending – from 1989 onwards, the Goodnight Kiwi was only seen on Channel 2 (TV1 adopted its closedown sequence, featuring the National Anthem) and ended with a voiceover stating "it's goodnight from Channel 2" and displaying the Channel 2 logo. On 19 October 1994, the last Goodnight Kiwi was broadcast on TV2, ending with a bumper saying:

Goodnight Kiwi and Cat

We are going to miss you (boo hoo!!)

Sleep well - from all of us here at TVNZ

On the next day, TVNZ started to broadcast for 24 hours on both TV1 and TV2, so there was no need to use the Goodnight Kiwi cartoon anymore. In the aftermath, an animated clip of the Goodnight Kiwi aired in the 8:30pm watershed, but was dropped in the late 90s, as it was seen unfitting within its commercial environment for being "old-fashioned looking".

The animation, characters and music are regarded as part of New Zealand culture and icons of kiwiana.

=== TVNZ 6 and 7 (2007-2012) ===
Later TVNZ revived The Goodnight Kiwi cartoon in 2007 and used to end programming on TVNZ 6 because the channel did not broadcast for 24 hours. The only difference between the original and the TVNZ 6 version was that the cartoon was displayed in 16:9, instead of 4:3, with some parts being cropped. There was also a lower third, which was displayed at the end of the cartoon. Lower third displayed: "Goodnight from TVNZ 6".

This same cartoon was also used for TVNZ 7, which displayed this same version as TVNZ 6, but with a lower third saying: "Goodnight from TVNZ 7". There was also a small alteration later on its final day, saying: "Goodbye from TVNZ 7". The Goodnight Kiwi was the last video ever played on this channel, as TVNZ 7 pulled the plug on June 30, 2012.

== Media produces by Goodnight Kiwi (2019-2023) ==
In 2019, the Kiwi returned once more as a TV series. The Goodnight Kiwi Stories featured prominent New Zealanders – including PM Jacinda Ardern – reading children's books in English and/or te reo Māori to help kids get to sleep. The show is only available on TVNZ+ (formerly TVNZ OnDemand).

There is a Matariki television special, Kiwi and Cat: Mānawātia a Matariki, where Kiwi and Cat learn about the stars of Matariki. The special features guest cameos, including Wellington Paranormal, Dame Lisa Carrington, Temuera Morrison, Jason Gunn and Benee.

== In popular culture ==
- TVNZ referred to the Goodnight Kiwi character as TV Kiwi in its cartoon merchandise. TVNZ produced a variety of Goodnight Kiwi memorabilia in the 1980s, including the magazine TV Kiwi and a book of short stories, TV Kiwi and the Cat.
- TVNZ 7 presenter Olly Ohlson used the name TV Kiwi for the character and occasionally performed a song 'The T. V. K. I. W. I.' on his afternoon show After School.
- Clips from, and references to, the Goodnight Kiwi occasionally appear in locally produced television, including an advertisement for the Retirement Commission's website Sorted.org.nz, in which a list of New Zealand's favourite logos appear in a group therapy session.
- In 2004, composer Victoria Kelly wrote a solo piano piece inspired by this animation. It was one of the set of 12 Landscape Preludes commissioned by Stephen de Pledge.
- The third edition of the 2005 season of Test the Nation: The New Zealand IQ featuring a Kiwiana quiz included the Goodnight Kiwi.
- The Goodnight Kiwi was referenced in episode 3 of season 3 of Outrageous Fortune ("Most true, she is a strumpet").
- The Goodnight Kiwi featured in a set of postage stamps entitled "A to Z of New Zealand", issued in 2008 by New Zealand Post to commemorate New Zealand's cultural heritage.
- The Goodnight Kiwi closedown clip is shown in the New Zealand movie Boy. The movie Boy was set in the year 1984; however, the Goodnight Kiwi clip shown was the version used on TV2 between 1989 and 1994 with the voiceover "Goodnight from Channel 2."
