= Back Benches =

- Presented by: Wallace Chapman; Damian Christie
- Country of origin: New Zealand
- Original language: English
- No. of series: 3
- No. of episodes: 102

Production
- Producer: Caroline Hall Bruner
- Production locations: Backbencher pub, Wellington
- Camera setup: Multi-camera
- Running time: 44–50 minutes
- Production company: TVNZ

Original release
- Network: TVNZ 7
- Release: 2 April 2008

Back Benches is a New Zealand political interview show, presented by Wallace Chapman and Damian Christie. It was primarily filmed at the Backbencher pub, across the street from Parliament Buildings in Wellington.

The show was cancelled on TVNZ 7 in July 2012 when the station was shut down, being replaced with TV ONE +1, a timeshift of TV ONE. The final three episodes were filmed at the Shepherd's Arms Hotel after an after-hours kitchen fire at the Backbencher pub rendered it unusable.

In August 2012, Prime TV expressed interest in reviving the series with a similar format. On 13 September 2012, it was confirmed that Prime would be bringing the show back in February 2013 by one of the show's hosts, Wallace Chapman. On 27 March 2013, the start date for the new series was confirmed as 10 April 2013 by Wallace Chapman and Damian Christie.

On 28 September 2017, it was announced by the producer Caroline Brunner on Twitter that Back Benches had aired its final show. The public agency that funds media, New Zealand On Air, did not renew funding for Back Benches.

== Format ==
Each episode a panel of about three to five people are present on the show. The panel members are usually sitting MPs. There is usually one from each of the National and Labour parties, and one from each of two other parties with seats (that is, Green, Māori, Mana, ACT, United Future and New Zealand First, parties).

There is also a summary of political news during the preceding week (from both New Zealand and internationally), a small (10 person) poll of a current issue or controversy, and a 'Who am I?' game where customers present at the pub can guess which sitting MP clues read out are about.

== See also ==
- Politics of New Zealand
- Parliament of New Zealand
