= Igloo (TV) =

New Zealand pay TV service

- Type: Joint-venture between Sky Network Television and TVNZ
- Industry: Prepaid Subscription Television
- Founded: December 2011
- Defunct: March 2017
- Headquarters: Auckland, New Zealand
- Key people: John Fellet, CEO of Sky; Peter Macourt, Chairman of Sky; Sir John Anderson, Chairman of TVNZ, Chaz Savage, GM of IGLOO
- Products: Igloo Prepaid Pay TV
- Website: igloo.co.nz

Igloo was a New Zealand prepaid pay TV service launched on 3 December 2012. The Pace-supplied receiver provides customers access to free-to-air channels through Freeview, and previously a small selection of pay TV channels could be purchased for 30 days. On 1 March 2017, Igloo closed and the receiver was updated to allow viewers to use New Zealand's Freeview television service.

== History ==
Igloo was founded by Sky Network Television and TVNZ in December 2011. Details were announced on December 8 via a press release. Sky held a 51% share in the venture while TVNZ, the minority shareholder has 49%. TVNZ later sold their shares back to Sky in 2013 before completely exiting the venture in 2014.

Igloo was originally scheduled to start during the first half of 2012, however, they encountered delays and had to push the launch date back to December 2012. The service offered free-to-air HD (via terrestrial), along with pay TV channels provided by Sky, to a set top box being developed by Sky. It used digital terrestrial frequencies owned by Sky previously used for their analogue terrestrial offering (which is no longer offered). Sky was required to make use of the spectrum or it would be taken by the Government.

In July 2016 Sky announced that Igloo will end its transmissions from March 2017. Customers will no longer be able to purchase Igloo Channel Packs, watch Front Row events or Igloo On Demand. Igloo boxes will still be able to receive Freeview channels but without any technical support or the EPG.

== Service ==
The service was targeted at individuals who may not be able to commit to a contract or do not need all of the channels available from the regular Sky pay TV offering.

Viewers could order live sport events via pay-per-view on the Front Row channel, as well as stream TV shows and movies using a broadband connection. The device provided by Igloo has the ability to "live pause" when a USB flash drive is inserted (as there is no hard disk drive built into the device). An 8 GB flash drive will allow for around 60 minutes of live pause.

Pay-channel broadcasting was DVB-T2 256-QAM transport via UHF channel 30 (546 MHz) or 31 (554 MHz). This was separate from the DVB-T 64-QAM transports used by Freeview.

=== Channels ===
Sky and TVNZ defined a virtual channel ordered that groups channels by importance to the service operator as follows.

General entertainment channels were below 20 which included TVNZ's free-to-air TV One (selected HD), free-to-air TV2 (selected HD), TVNZ Heartland and TVNZ Kidzone24 (later Nick Jr. from 2016-17), MediaWorks' free-to-air TV3 (selected HD) and free-to-air Four, free-to-air Prime, Front Row (pay-per-view sports), News Corporation's National Geographic, Viacom Media Networks channels MTV Hits and Comedy Central, Vibe, BBC Worldwide's BBC UKTV, BBC Knowledge and BBC World News, Food Television and Discovery Communications' Animal Planet.

All other national Freeview channels spilled over from 20 to 29 and 35 and from 50 to 59 which included timeshifted hour delay channels for TV One, TV2, TV3 and Four, government funded Māori Television and Parliament TV, Trackside, ChoiceTV, The Shopping Channel, World TV's Chinese channels CTV8 and TV9 and the Christian channels Firstlight and Hope Channel.

Kordia locally inserted channels were from 30 to 34 which for the Waikato and Bay of Plenty is tvCentral, for Rotorua are TV Rotorua and Info-Rotorua, for Auckland is TV33 and for Whangarei is Channel North.

Freeview audio only radio channels were from 36 to 39 which includes BaseFM.

=== Former digital H.222 transport (now closed) ===
DVB encrypted Terrestrial Services on transport 65 via the DTT – Sky New Zealand DVB network
Service	Description	Irdeto LCN	DVB name	Streams
4101	Animal focused reality TV	13	Animal Planet	2001 (H.264@2 Mbit/s – 720x576ix25), 3001 (HE-AACv2@32 kbit/s – 48000x2), 2101 (teletext subtitle), 1101 (Irdeto key control)
4102	BBC Worldwide news and information service	16	BBC World News	2002 (H.264@2 Mbit/s – 720x576ix25), 3002 (HE-AACv2@32 kbit/s – 48000x2), 1102 (Irdeto key control)
4103	US and UK re-run sitcoms, stand-up and sketch comedy	9	Comedy Central	2003 (H.264@2 Mbit/s – 720x576ix25), 3003 (HE-AACv2@32 kbit/s – 48000x2), 1103 (Irdeto key control)
4104	BBC Worldwide soap operas, re-run dramas and comedies	7	BBC UKTV	2004 (H.264@2 Mbit/s – 720x576ix25), 3004 (HE-AACv2@32 kbit/s – 48000x2), 2104 (teletext subtitle), 1104 (Irdeto key control)
4105	UK/Australian/US DIY and competition cooking	12	Food TV	2005 (H.264@2 Mbit/s – 720x576ix25), 3005 (HE-AACv2@32 kbit/s – 48000x2), 1105 (Irdeto key control)
4106	BBC Worldwide documentaries and reality TV	11	BBC Knowledge	2006 (H.264@2 Mbit/s – 720x576ix25), 3006 (HE-AACv2@32 kbit/s – 48000x2), 2106 (teletext subtitle), 1106 (Irdeto key control)
4107	Music video compilations	15	MTV Hits	2007(H.264@2 Mbit/s – 720x576ix25), 3007 (HE-AACv2@32 kbit/s – 48000x2), 1107 (Irdeto key control)
4108	TVNZ-owned packaging of youth shows	14	TVNZ Kidzone24	2008 (H.264@2 Mbit/s – 720x576ix25), 3008 (HE-AACv2@32 kbit/s – 48000x2), 1108 (Irdeto key control)
4109	US/Australian documentaries and reality TV	8	National Geographic	2009 (H.264@2 Mbit/s – 720x576ix25), 3009 (HE-AACv2@32 kbit/s – 48000x2), 2109 (teletext subtitle), 1109 (Irdeto key control)
4110	TVNZ-owned archived and funded material	17	TVNZ Heartland	2010 (H.264@2 Mbit/s – 720x576ix25), 3010 (HE-AACv2@32 kbit/s – 48000x2), 2110 (teletext subtitle), 1110 (Irdeto key control)
4111	US/UK re-runs and reality TV	10	Vibe	2011 (H.264@2 Mbit/s – 720x576ix25), 3011 (HE-AACv2@32 kbit/s – 48000x2), 1111 (Irdeto key control)
4112	Pay-per-view events	6	Front Row	2012 (H.264@2 Mbit/s – 720x576ix25), 3012 (HE-AACv2@32 kbit/s – 48000x2), 1112 (Irdeto key control)

== See also ==
- Subscription television in New Zealand
- List of free-to-air channels in New Zealand
