= TVNZ Sport =

New Zealand programming division of TVNZ

TVNZ Sport is a division of TVNZ which airs many of the sports telecasts in New Zealand.

TVNZ Sport broadcasts programs like The Championships, Wimbledon, Commonwealth Games, and the America's Cup.

TVNZ Sport was originally known as One Sport and later 1 Sport. It was renamed due to sports being broadcast on TVNZ 1, TVNZ Duke and TVNZ+.

== Past Sports Rights Held ==
They previously held the rights to live coverage of the international rugby union until 1996, live cricket matches until 1999, and the Olympic Games until 2008.

== Sports programming ==
=== Current ===
- ANZ Premiership netball
- FIFA World Cup football
- OFC Pro Leaugue football
- Paralympic Games
- LIV Golf Golf Chamionship
- Superbikes World Championship motorsport
- Women's Circut Racing World Championship motorsport
- South Island Boys First XV Rugby rugby union
- Asian Le Mans Series motorsport
- National Provincial Championship rugby union
- UFC Mixed Martial Arts
- WRC World Rally Championship
- King in the Ring Kickboxing
- America's Cup Sailing
- Men's Super Smash and Women's Super Smash cricket

=== Previous ===
- English Premier League
- English FA Cup (semis and final only)
- Super Rugby
- World Rugby Sevens Series Wellington tournament only
- New Zealand Golf Open
- V8 Supercars and the Bathurst 1000
- Wellington 500
- New Zealand ASB Tennis Classic
- New Zealand Heineken Tennis Open
- The Championships, Wimbledon
- Commonwealth Games
- Olympic Games
- 2020 Olympic Games - Free-to-air partner with Sky Sport
- 2023 Rugby World Cup - Free-to-air partner with Spark Sport
- 2021 America's Cup
- Formula One - Free-to-air from 1999 to 2005.
- England cricket internationals - 2023 season
- 2023 Ashes series
- The Hundred - 2023 season
- Vitality Blast - 2023 season
- PFL Mixed Martial Arts
- New Zealand Cricket home internationals

== See also ==
- Sky Sport (New Zealand)
- Spark Sport
