= TVNZ Kidzone =

New Zealand television channel

- Country: New Zealand
- Broadcast area: National

Ownership
- Owner: Television New Zealand, Ltd.
- Sister channels: TV One; TV2; U TVNZ 7 TVNZ Heartland; TVNZ Pop-up; Duke

History
- Launched: 1 May 2011
- Closed: 30 April 2016

Links
- Website: tvnz.co.nz/kidzone

TVNZ Kidzone was a 24-hour New Zealand children's channel service run by state broadcaster Television New Zealand. The channel ran on Digital 106, channel 46 on Sky and channel 14 on Igloo.

== History ==
Kidzone was originally a 12-hour service running on former TVNZ channel TVNZ 6. It then ran on TVNZ 7 for a year before its closure in 2012. TVNZ launched TVNZ Kidzone as TVNZ Kidzone24 on 1 May 2011, two months after the closure of TVNZ 6, by then, TVNZ 7 was carrying a two-hour Kidzone block.

TVNZ closed the channel on 30 April 2016, due to SKY's contract with TVNZ expiring at the end of that month. It was made available via TVNZ OnDemand on May 1, 2016.
