= Television New Zealand Ltd v Quinn =

New Zealand defamation case

- Court: Court of Appeal of New Zealand
- Full case name: Television New Zealand Limited v TA Quinn
- Decided: 19 April 1996
- Citation: [1996] 3 NZLR 24
- Transcript: High Court judgment

Court membership
- Judges sitting: Cooke P, Richardson J, Gault J, McKay J, Mcgechan J

Keywords
- defamation

Television New Zealand Ltd v Quinn [1996] 3 NZLR 24 is a New Zealand defamation case.

== Background ==
TVNZ current affairs show Holmes, in 2 different episodes alleging that the president of the Auckland Trotting Club, Mr Quinn was involved in illegal horse doping and financial misconduct involving the club.

Both allegations were later to be discovered to be untrue. It was also later held that the programs investigation at the time did not meet the expected journalist standards.

Quinn sued TVNZ for defamation for both matters, and was awarded $400,000 for the horse doping allegation, and $1.1 million for the financial misconduct allegation.

TVNZ appealed both awards.

== Held ==
The Court of Appeal ruled that the award for the $400,000 while it was at the upper amount for defamation, it was not going to be reversed. However, with regards to the award for $1.1 million, the court found this to be excessive, and referred it back to the High Court, with the recommendation that any award over $500,000 might be found excessive.
