= TVNZ Duke =

New Zealand television channel

- Country: New Zealand
- Broadcast area: National
- Headquarters: Auckland, New Zealand

Programming
- Picture format: 1080i (HDTV)

Ownership
- Owner: Television New Zealand
- Sister channels: TVNZ 1 TVNZ 2 TVNZ 1+1; TVNZ 2+1

History
- Launched: 20 March 2016; 10 years ago
- Former names: Duke

Links
- Webcast: Watch live (NZ only)
- Website: www.tvnz.co.nz/livetv/tvnz-duke

Availability

Terrestrial
- Freeview: 6

TVNZ Duke (formerly Duke; stylised as TVNZ DUKE or DUKE) is a New Zealand television channel run by state broadcaster Television New Zealand (TVNZ). It screens programming targeted at a male audience. It was launched on 20 March 2016 to replace TVNZ's popup channel that was used to air the Wimbledon Championships. Initially advertised as a male-skewed channel, this branding was later dropped.

TVNZ Duke offers a schedule of programmes which include comedy, drama, documentaries, movies, music (under the DUKEbox Music banner) and sport. It initially broadcast between the hours of 6pm and midnight, and occasionally screened live sport events outside these hours; On average, it currently broadcasts from 10.30am until late on weekdays and from 7am until late on weekends. The channel is available on Freeview channel 6 and channel 23 on Sky. Some programmes are also available on the streaming service TVNZ+.

TVNZ Duke started broadcasting in 1080i HD on terrestrially channel 13 on 11 January 2018; the online live stream of the channel had already been streaming up to 720p.

On 21 March 2022, TVNZ Duke moved to channel 6, a slot formerly occupied by TVNZ 6 and its replacement U. From 2013 to 2022, the slot was occupied by TVNZ's timeshift channels.

== Programming ==
=== Local series ===
- The Moment
- Banter
- NZ Hunter Adventures
- Misadventures
- Wild Kai Legends
- Short & Wide
- Quizmas
- The Inside Word
- Dog Squad
- Motorway Patrol
- Spiky Gold Hunters
- Southern Pro Wrestling
- Late Night Big Breakfast

== Sports rights ==
- Formula E (Live and Weekly Highlights Shows)

Licensed from Sky Sport :

- AFL Aussie Rules Football (Live, Delayed and Highlights)

Licensed from Spark Sport :

- Wimbledon Tennis Championships (Live, Highlights, Match of the Day)
- Heineken Champions Cup (Two matches per week in weekend morning)
- World Rally Championship (Live and Replays)
- FIH
  - 2022 Women's and 2023 Men's World Cups
  - Men's and Women's Hockey Pro Leagues (Live coverage for NZ matches only)
- Cricket
  - Men's Super Smash
  - Women's Super Smash

== TVNZ Duke+1 ==
TVNZ Duke+1
- Broadcast area: National

Programming
- Picture format: 16:9 (SDTV)

History
- Launched: 17 November 2020

Availability

Terrestrial
- DVB 64-QAM on band IV

TVNZ Duke+1 is a one-hour timeshifted channel that was launched on Freeview on 17 November 2020. TVNZ Duke+1 is available on Channel 12 on Freeview via UHF and Sky channel 504.

During the 2021 lockdown, Home Learning TV, which was carried on TVNZ 2+1 the previous year, moved to the TVNZ Duke+1 service.
