= TVNZ 7 =

New Zealand television channel

- Country: New Zealand
- Broadcast area: New Zealand; Pacific Islands
- Headquarters: Auckland, New Zealand

Programming
- Picture format: 576i 16:9 (SDTV)

Ownership
- Owner: Television New Zealand
- Sister channels: TV One; TV2; TVNZ 6; (later TVNZ U); TVNZ Heartland

History
- Launched: 30 March 2008
- Closed: 30 June 2012
- Replaced by: TVNZ 1+1
- Former names: TVNZ News 24 (working title)

Availability

Terrestrial
- Freeview|HD: Channel 7

TVNZ 7 was a commercial-free New Zealand 24-hour news and information channel on Freeview digital television platform and on Sky Network Television from 1 July 2009. It was produced by TVNZ, which received Government funding to launch two additional channels. The channel went to air just after 10 am on 25 March 2008 with a looped preview reel. The channel was officially launched at noon on 30 March 2008 with a special "kingmaker" political debate held within the Parliament building and featuring most of the elected minor party leaders. The channel went off air at midnight on 30 June 2012 to the Goodnight Kiwi.

It featured TVNZ News Now updates every hour from 6 am to 11 pm, with a specialised 'zone' between 6 am and 9 am on weekdays, throughout which ten-minute bulletins were aired back-to-back. TVNZ 7 also featured an hour-long bulletin, TVNZ News at 8, at 8 pm each night. It was hosted on weeknights by Greg Boyed and on weekends by Miriama Kamo.

While it was originally reported to be a 'rolling news channel', similar to Sky News and CNN Headline News, Eric Kearley, head of TVNZ's Digital Launch team, stated about 70% of the schedule would be "factual variety" programming – a mix of local and overseas documentaries, and programmes that discuss current events and sport, with the remaining 30% being the news updates. A full schedule was released on 28 February 2008.

== History ==
The New Zealand Government announced in November 2006 that it would finance two new TVNZ channels for the then-upcoming Freeview platform, in a six-year plan costing NZ$79 million. Initially known under the working title TVNZ News 24 (previously TVNZ 4 as of March 2007), its launch was initially scheduled for late 2007.

The channel was relaunched on 1 March 2011, taking some programming from TVNZ 6, another Freeview-based digital channel, when TVNZ decided to transform into an interactive broadcast station TVNZ U. On 6 April 2011, it was officially announced that TVNZ 7 would cease broadcast in June 2012. This was confirmed when Broadcasting Minister Jonathan Coleman stated on behalf of the government that they would not extend further funding for the channel due to low ratings. This was despite viewing figures that suggested half of all households with Freeview at the time were watching TVNZ 7 – around 700,000 people – and not the 207,000 claimed by Coleman. In March 2012, Television New Zealand confirmed this decision and announced there would be no eleventh-hour reprieve for TVNZ 7.

TVNZ 7 was replaced on 1 July 2012 by TV One Plus 1, a timeshift channel of TV One.

== Programming ==
=== TVNZ News Now ===
TVNZ 7 operated as a rolling news channel between 6 am and midnight, with bulletins broadcast for six to 12 minutes every hour. This included hourly bulletins from 6 am to 11 pm every day, except for at 8 pm.

Every TVNZ News Now bulletin was researched, written, produced and presented by a presenter/producer duo. These included Glen Larmer, Jenny-May Coffin, Brooke Dobson, Ben Christie, Tiffany Hardy, Fiona Anderson, Filipo McGrath, Andrew Scott, Susana Guttenbeil, Lisa Glass, Sandra Kailahi, Christopher Lynch, Sonia Voigt and Katie Chapman.

Because of limited resources, the bulletins were scripted from news gathered from wire sources. These included One News and TVNZ affiliates Newstalk ZB, ABC America, ABC Australia, and the BBC.

=== TVNZ News at 8 ===
TVNZ News at 8 was an hour-long commercial-free news and current affairs programme based on the One News at 6 bulletin of the same evening. It aired seven days a week at 8 pm. Because the programme was commercial-free, with less sports coverage and simpler weather forecasts than One News, it was able to include the extended interviews that were the basis for the shorter One News reports, as well as more world news reports from international affiliates such as ABC America, ABC Australia, the BBC and CNN.

The programme was hosted on weeknights by Tonight presenter Greg Boyed, and on weekends by Sunday presenter Miriama Kamo. The programme originally had a two presenter format, with Geraldine Knox on weekdays and Sonia Voigt on weekends.

=== Original programming ===
TVNZ 7 included two year-round, weekly flagship current affairs programmes:

- Media 7 – a media review programme with Russell Brown
- Back Benches – a weekly Wednesday show live from the Backbencher pub opposite the Parliament Buildings in Wellington by Wallace Chapman

On 23 September 2008, starting at 9 pm, TVNZ 7 hosted a one-off live debate on Internet-related issues from Avalon Studios in Wellington. The debate, co-sponsored by InternetNZ, was hosted by Damian Christie, and moderated by The New Zealand Herald's Fran O'Sullivan and Russell Brown. The debating panel included ICT Minister David Cunliffe, Opposition ICT spokesman Maurice Williamson, ACT leader Rodney Hide, and Green Party ICT spokeswoman Metiria Turei.

== Controversy ==
Starting in October 2009, TVNZ 7 ran a promo for a new series of shows under the title "Spotlight on the Economy". The promo was publicising a new show featuring finance minister Bill English. Critics pointed out that the promo voiced by Bill English was done in the style of a political advertisement and promised to explain the recession in "plain English" – the name of Bill English's weekly email newsletter. It later emerged in papers released under the Official Information Act that Bill English had re-written the majority of the script to replace lines written by TVNZ with rhetoric that might be considered more conducive towards National Party policies. TVNZ claimed that because they were not in an election year and that the promo in question was promoting another programme that they did not have to present a balanced view and that many of their viewers did not care about giving other voices equal time. Later in November 2009, TVNZ acknowledged having the minister in the channel's promos was a mistake.

Further controversy ensued when Broadcasting Minister Jonathan Coleman announced that TVNZ 7 would not have its funding renewed. This prompted a campaign by TVNZ 7 supporters to oppose the decision, as TVNZ 7 was the only non-commercial public television channel in New Zealand. In April 2011, TVNZ 7 supporters also pointed out that the government had happily given a handout to TVNZ competitor MediaWorks, in the form of a government-initiated deferral of payments scheme worth $43 million. They also cited the hypocrisy of shutting down TVNZ 7 while local shows with imported formats, such as The G.C. and New Zealand's Got Talent, were receiving taxpayer funding from NZ On Air. Media commentator Brian Edwards pointed out that without TVNZ 7, New Zealand was about to join Mexico as the only other country in the OECD without a public service television channel.

A report released under the Official Information Act in November 2012 showed 91 percent of people who were aware of TVNZ 7's existence believed it was important to have a publicly funded news and information TV station. The survey, conducted before the decision was made to close the TVNZ 7 channel, was not released to the public due to being "commercially sensitive", despite the station being non-commercial.

== Closure ==
On 28th June 2012 about 200 people marched through Wellington in protest of impending closure.

On the day of TVNZ 7's shutdown, a mock funeral procession was held in downtown Auckland. Among the more notable participants was Megaupload founder Kim Dotcom, who had warmed to Media7 for its championing of Internet freedom.

TVNZ 7 ceased broadcasting on 30 June 2012 just before midnight. It closed with the Goodnight Kiwi with "Goodbye from TVNZ 7" superimposed on it. At 7 am on 1 July, TV One Plus 1 started on the same channel.
