= The Official NZ Top 40 =

- Genre: Music
- Directed by: Damien Daniels
- Presented by: Shannon Ryan

Production
- Camera setup: Single-camera
- Running time: 60 – 120 minutes

Original release
- Network: C4
- Release: 2003 – 2010

Related
- Drew and Shannon Live

The Official NZ Top 40 is a NZ made music countdown television show which was a countdown of the New Zealand Singles Chart music. It used the official chart produced by the Recording Industry Association of New Zealand. While the RIANZ charts are published for the week ending Monday, and published on Tuesday, The Official NZ Top 40 was shown on Saturday evenings, usually at 6pm, unless changed due to other events. The Official NZ Top 40 was also replayed on C4 again on Tuesday from 2pm to 4pm which was an extended version of the show. The only change was that the show started showing most videos in full if applicable.

== Format ==
All of the 40 singles in the chart were named, with excerpts of their music videos (if they have them). Some songs had their entire music videos played. The top 5 albums were also listed. Number-one singles from other countries (including Australia, the UK and the US) were also shown

== See also ==
- Recording Industry Association of New Zealand
- C4
