= Four Live (New Zealand TV programme) =

- Directed by: Craig Easson
- Presented by: Drew Neemia and Kanoa Lloyd
- Music by: Phoebe Spiers
- Composer: Sam Harvey
- Country of origin: New Zealand
- Original language: English

Production
- Producer: Damien Daniels
- Editor: Dan Cummings
- Camera setup: multi-camera
- Running time: 90 minutes

Original release
- Network: FOUR
- Release: 13 February 2012 – August 2014

Four Live (stylised as FOUR Live) is a New Zealand topical entertainment programme that aired weekday afternoons (4:30-6 pm) on FOUR. It was hosted by Drew Neemia and Kanoa Lloyd. Many guests appeared on the programme to feature the latest in music, fashion, entertainment, gaming and film.

Four Live encouraged viewers to take part in the programme through Facebook and Twitter. The programme asked the opinions from viewers on their daily topic post and the presenters address those opinions from viewers throughout the programme. Viewers were allowed to win prizes through live on air telephone competitions, text in competitions and online competitions.

It was replaced by Smash! in 2014. In 2015, Smash! moved exclusively to The Edge TV; this was replaced by Daily Feed in 2017.

== Viewer requested music videos ==
Viewers were able to request music videos throughout the programme on Monday, Tuesday, Wednesday and Friday. Text codes that correspond to a music video scrolled along the bottom of the screen. Viewers were charged 50 cents when sending a text to 4440 and their request was taken on board for consideration to be played out on-air. Music video requests could be made on the Four Live Facebook and Twitter page, but whether or not the request is fulfilled was up to the presenters and directors. This channel was later banned in the prisons due to messages being sent to prisoners through the Four Live text system, when they showed texts on screen. A list of the text codes were to be found on the Four Live text request page.

== The Official NZ Top 40 ==
The Official NZ Top 40 is made up from a list of songs from the New Zealand Top 40 Singles Chart which is published by Recorded Music NZ. Recorded Music NZ also releases information on the Top 40 Albums in New Zealand.

Before Drew and Shannon Live (Four Live's predecessor programme) aired on Four, an individual programme 'The Official NZ Top 40' was formed. This programme ended in December 2010. The Official NZ Top 40 later became a part of Drew and Shannon Live's Thursday afternoon shows, then part of Four Live.

Thursdays were hosted by Kanoa Lloyd.

== Repeat ==
Four Live was aired live on Four, weekdays at 4:30 but the programme could be re-watched on C4, weeknights at 7:30. The programme on C4 was a repeat, meaning that votes for music videos and entries for competitions may have no longer applied.

== Previous presenters ==
In 2012, Four Live was hosted by Shannon Ryan and Serena Cooper. 2013 saw Shannon Ryan return as the regular host of the programme and Sharyn Casey replacing the presenter of the Top 40 and co-host of Four Live.

2014 introduced a new presenter lineup of Four Live, with Drew Neemia and Kanoa Lloyd being the co-hosts of FOUR Live.
