= Wallace Chapman =

New Zealand radio and television host (born 1969)

- Born: Walesi Leslie Chapman; 1969 (age 56–57)
- Presenting career
- Show: Back Benches
- Station: Prime TV
- Network: Sky TV
- Time slot: 10:30–11:30pm Wednesday
- Show: Sunday Morning
- Station: Radio New Zealand National
- Network: Radio New Zealand
- Style: Political commentator
- Country: New Zealand

Wallace Leslie Chapman (born 1969) is a New Zealand radio and television host.

== Early life ==
Chapman's parents were Wallace and Fay Chapman and his father was a Fijian minister. He attended Nelson College from 1982 to 1986.

== Career ==
He began his broadcasting career while a student at the University of Otago with student radio station Radio One. After moving from Dunedin to Auckland, he joined the staff of Radio 95bFM before changing to Kiwi FM where he hosted The Wallace Chapman Drive.

In December 2013 it was announced that he would be the new host of Sunday Morning on Radio New Zealand National, taking over from Chris Laidlaw.

Between 2008 and 2017, he co-hosted the political television show Back Benches.

In January 2019 he began hosting Radio New Zealand's late afternoon current affairs show, The Panel.

== Personal life ==
Chapman knew David Bain, a man accused of killing his own family in 1994, but found not guilty by a jury in 2009.

Chapman suffers from Gaucher's disease, a genetic disease which has left him with weakened hip joints.

== See also ==
- List of New Zealand television personalities
