= Drew and Shannon Live =

- Presented by: Drew Neemia, Shannon Ryan
- Country of origin: New Zealand
- Original language: English

Production
- Producer: Damien Daniels
- Running time: 90 minutes

Original release
- Network: FOUR
- Release: February 7, 2011 – December 2011

Related
- Four Live

Drew & Shannon Live is a topical entertainment show, airing weekday afternoons (4.30-6pm) on FOUR, and co-hosted by Drew Neemia and Shannon Ryan. It was aimed to be a daily wrap of relatable entertainment for an 18- to 49-year-old audience. Content is audience-focused and entertainment-driven, with a focus on eclecticism, featuring segments covering film, gaming, TV, music, fashion, sport, technology, among others.

Drew and Shannon Live posted on Facebook and Twitter a daily topic. Neemia and Ryan addressed the topic and people's opinions throughout the show.

It was service-driven, keeping the audience informed and entertained by also allowing them to engage both with the show and each other. Content is syndicated online and linked with social media (Facebook, Twitter feeds) allowing the establishment of member groups where interested viewers can connect with other viewers and contribute to the show's content. Other reviews/guests replaced either Drew or Shannon after a break or a music video.

The show was repeated on C4 at 7.30pm.

The show often had Serena Cooper and/or Sharyn Wakefield covering for Neemia and/or Ryan during their absence.

In January 2012, the show was replaced by Four Live.
