= TVNZ 6 =

New Zealand television channel

- TVNZ 6 Logo
- Country: New Zealand
- Broadcast area: New Zealand
- Network: TVNZ
- Headquarters: Auckland, New Zealand

Programming
- Picture format: 576i (16:9 SDTV)

Ownership
- Owner: Television New Zealand
- Sister channels: TV One; TV2; TVNZ 7 TVNZ Heartland; TVNZ Sport Extra

History
- Launched: 30 September 2007; 18 years ago
- Closed: 28 February 2011; 15 years ago
- Replaced by: TVNZ U
- Former names: TVNZ Home (working title)

Links
- Website: tvnz6.co.nz

Availability

Terrestrial
- Freeview|HD: Channel 6

TVNZ 6 was a digital-only, commercial-free television channel operated by Television New Zealand. It launched in September 2007, and was available in 60.3% of New Zealand homes on the Freeview and SKY Television Digital platforms. TVNZ 6 was on air daily from 6am to midnight.

The channel's working titles were TVNZ Home and later, TVNZ 3. The name TVNZ 6 was chosen because it was numeric, was deemed to allow "a broader content structure than any descriptive title", and matched the number assigned to it on the Freeview electronic programme guide.

== Schedule ==
TVNZ 6's Kidzone logo

TVNZ 6 showed pre-school programmes during the Kidzone block from 6am to 6pm. Until its closure at the end of June 2012, TVNZ 7 also aired Kidzone from 6am to 8am. Kidzone also received a 24-hour channel on Sky TV called Kidzone24. The channel then played family programmes after Kidzone until closedown at midnight.

=== At launch ===
At the very start of TVNZ 6's launch, the channel was structured such that its daily schedule had three separate services titled: TVNZ Kidzone (6am to 4pm), TVNZ Family (4pm to 8:30pm), and TVNZ Showcase (arts & drama service; 8:30pm to midnight).

== Closure ==
TVNZ 6 ceased broadcasting on 28 February 2011 and was replaced on 13 March 2011 by TVNZ U, a "social" channel targeted at 15- to 24-year-olds. Kidzone, Shortland Street: From the Beginning and other TVNZ 6 content moved to sister channels TVNZ 7, TVNZ Heartland and TVNZ Kidzone24. TVNZ U was advertiser-supported and ran from midday to midnight.
