= U (TV channel) =

Defunct New Zealand TV channel

- TVNZ U Logo
- Country: New Zealand
- Broadcast area: National
- Headquarters: Auckland, New Zealand

Programming
- Picture format: 16:9 (576i, SDTV)

Ownership
- Owner: TVNZ
- Sister channels: TV One; TV2; Heartland

History
- Launched: 13 March 2011; 15 years ago
- Replaced: TVNZ 6
- Closed: 31 August 2013; 13 years ago
- Replaced by: TVNZ 2+1

Links
- Website: TVNZ U website, http://www.facebook.com/tvnzu

Availability

Terrestrial
- DVB 64-QAM on band IV

TVNZ U, more known as U, was an interactive youth-oriented New Zealand television channel, owned and operated by TVNZ. The channel launched on 13 March 2011, and featured reality programming, as well as an interactive live show and music content. It replaced the now defunct TVNZ 6. Leading up to the launch of U, there were 13 days' worth of promotional videos and programming information aired to advertise the new channel.

Initially, U closed down every night at midnight, playing the Goodnight Kiwi animation to signal the end of nightly broadcast. During its closedown period of 12-midnight to 12-noon, the channel looped a video of non-stop dancing with text reading U 'returns at midday'.

From February 2012, the channel began broadcasting infomercials from midnight until midday, except on Saturday and Sunday mornings, when it is illegal to broadcast adverts. On Saturday and Sunday, the channel closes down as usual, with infomercials played until 6am, a graphic is displayed from 6am until midday, and then the broadcast 'returns at midday'.

In April 2013, the channel launched U Late, a late night version of its flagship programme U Live, but without the music videos. It was described as late night antics and chat, live and interactive every evening.

On 29 July 2013, TVNZ announced that U would cease broadcast on 31 August 2013, after two years since the channel launch.

== History ==
=== Pre-launch ===
In December 2010, TVNZ announced that it would discontinue TVNZ 6 in favor of a youth channel, whose concept was labelled as "social television" (by integrating social media into its operations). Unlike TVNZ 6, the new channel was set to be commercial from the outset. Eric Kearley justified the rationale for its launch based on two factors: the lack of a dedicated channel for the 15-24 demographic on free-to-air television, as well as the downsizing of youth TV in New Zealand, as MTV shut down its local channel a few weeks earlier and MediaWorks announced that it would replace C4 with Four, which would skew to an older demographic. A key characteristic of the new channel was the usage of Facebook for its flagship programme U Live.

In preparation of the launch of U, TVNZ established a Facebook page for their new channel, giving fans information and offering one person the chance to schedule a selected segment of programming on the new channel for a month (known as U TV). On the evening of 28 February 2011, TVNZ 6 was officially shut down, allowing TVNZ to air promotional material for the new channel. At 3 pm on 9 March 2011, TVNZ activated its U Live application on Facebook, which, upon the launch of the channel, would allow users to share content and have it displayed as part of the U Live TV show.

=== Launch ===
U was launched on 13 March 2011 at 4 pm on Freeview channel 6 and Sky channel 16. The first program to air was U Live.

The channel launched without delivering ratings data, a TVNZ spokesman suggested that ratings would only depend on U's growth strategy, as well as receiving a minimum sample of the population in order to release ratings. On the week between 8-14 May 2011, 1,392,400 viewers — 34% of the national population — tuned in to the channel at least once, exceeding all expectations, larger than MTV and E!, whose individual cumulative figures were slightly lower, but surpassed a million.

=== Later developments ===
On 1 April 2013, the channel premiered U Late, a late night counterpart to U Live.

=== Closure ===
TVNZ announced on 28 July 2013 that it would close U on 31 August 2013 after two years running at a loss. TVNZ announced that time-shift channel TV2+1 would launch to replace the channel on 1 September 2013 at 7 am. The final show to screen on U was U Live with the entire crew giving a farewell message, the final song to play on U Live was "2 Times" by Ann Lee. After the end credits for U Live, a message was displayed on the U channel advising viewers of the new channel number for TV One +1 and TV2+1 (now TVNZ 1 +1 and TVNZ 2 +1 respectively). The channel numbers vary for viewers of Sky, Freeview and Igloo.

== U Live ==
The flagship show of U was U Live, a live show which aired 4pm – 7pm daily. The show featured music, interviews, and other general interest content. Viewers were invited to participate via a Facebook application, where they could vote in polls, take part in discussions, and view the show via a live commercial and graphic free stream. Comments and polls were then selected and displayed on screen during broadcast. U Live was hosted by Rose Matafeo, Connor Nestor, Matt Gibb, Eli Matthewson and former George FM breakfast host Kirsteen MacKenzie. U Live drew many parallels to TVNZ's rival network MediaWorks' youth-oriented show Four Live, which aired on FOUR.

== U's themed nights ==
U had themed programming for the different days of the week, with each theme having a distinctive title. Selected programming available on each night is listed below.

Day	Theme	Shows
Monday	"Guts Monday"	BMX Road Fools; Airtime; Speeders Specials; Homegrown Maniacs
Tuesday	"Dude Tuesday"	The Cool Guy Files; Rhett And Link – Commercial Kings; Tough Guy Or Chicken?
Wednesday	"Pash Wednesday"	The Shire; Tough Love – New Orleans
Thursday	"Girl Thursday"	Made in Chelsea; Sorority Girls; Big Rich Texas
Friday	"Knock Out Friday"	The Exclusives; Real World – Road Rules
Saturday	"U Again Saturday"	Repeated programming
Sunday	"U Go Sunday"	Travelling Unplugged; Roam; Ultimate Traveller; Amazing Adventures of a Nobody

- Programming until closure (31 August 2013)

=== Other programming ===
Most of the channel's line-up consisted of international reality content, including the aforementioned theme nights. In addition to reality shows, it aired video game-related programming produced by Ginx TV, per a deal inked in January 2011.
