= TVNZ =

New Zealand state-owned television network

Television New Zealand Limited (TVNZ)
- Logo used since 2016
- Native name: Te Reo Tātaki o Aotearoa (Māori)
- Type: Crown entity company
- Industry: Broadcast television
- Predecessor: Television One; South Pacific Television
- Founded: February 1980; 46 years ago
- Headquarters: Auckland, New Zealand
- Number of locations: New Zealand
- Area served: Nationally (New Zealand) and some Pacific Island nations such as the Cook Islands, Fiji, and the Solomon Islands
- Key people: Jodi O'Donnell (CEO)
- Products: Television
- Revenue: NZ$155,900,000 (sixth months of 2023)
- Net income: NZ$−16,700,000 (sixth months of 2023)
- Total assets: 43.2% (2019)
- Owner: Minister of Finance (50%); Minister for Media and Communications (50%) (New Zealand government)
- Divisions: TVNZ 1; TVNZ 2; TVNZ 1+1; TVNZ 2+1; TVNZ Duke; TVNZ+; 1News; TVNZ Sport
- Subsidiaries: Former TV stations: TVNZ Sport Extra (2009); TVNZ 6 (2011); TVNZ 7 (2012); U (2013); TVNZ Heartland (2015); TVNZ Kidzone (2016)
- Website: www.tvnz.co.nz

Television New Zealand (TVNZ; Māori: Te Reo Tātaki o Aotearoa, lit. 'The Leading Voice of New Zealand'), more commonly referred to as TVNZ, is a New Zealand state-owned media company and Crown entity. The company operates a television network, streaming service, and news service that is available throughout New Zealand and parts of the Pacific region. All of its currently-operating channels are free-to-air and funded through advertising.

TVNZ was established in February 1980 following the merger of the two government-owned television networks, Television One (now TVNZ 1) and South Pacific Television (now TVNZ 2), under a single administration. It was the sole television broadcaster in New Zealand until November 1989 when private channel TV3 (now Three) was launched.

TVNZ operates playout services from its Auckland studio via Kordia's fibre and microwave network for TVNZ 1, TVNZ 2 and TVNZ Duke, with new media video services via the American-owned Brightcove which is streamed on the Akamai RTMP/HLS DNS based caching network, as TVNZ+. Its former channels include TVNZ Kidzone (closed 30 April 2016), TVNZ Heartland (closed 31 May 2015), TVNZ U (closed August 2013), TVNZ 7 (closed June 2012), TVNZ 6 (closed 2011), and TVNZ Sport Extra (closed 2009).

TVNZ is commercially supported and receives no direct government subsidies. Under the Television New Zealand Act, the broadcaster is legislatively required to "maintain its commercial performance" while providing "high-quality content" which "encompasses both New Zealand and international content and reflects Māori perspectives."

There has been reoccurring debate about TVNZ's role and whether it should be treated as a public-service broadcaster or a fully commercial network. The broadcaster currently operates as a wholly commercial business.

== History ==
| Ownership | Channel Year | 1 | 2 | 6 | 7 | 11 | 12 | 13 | 14 | 18 | 20 | Sky 17 | Sky 46 |
|---|---|---|---|---|---|---|---|---|---|---|---|---|---|
| Separate | 1960 | NZBC TV | —N/a | —N/a | —N/a | —N/a | —N/a | —N/a | —N/a | —N/a | —N/a | —N/a | —N/a |
| Separate | 1975 | TV One | TV2 | —N/a | —N/a | —N/a | —N/a | —N/a | —N/a | —N/a | —N/a | —N/a | —N/a |
| Separate | 1976 | TV One | South Pacific Television | —N/a | —N/a | —N/a | —N/a | —N/a | —N/a | —N/a | —N/a | —N/a | —N/a |
| TVNZ | 1980 | TV One | TV2 | —N/a | —N/a | —N/a | —N/a | —N/a | —N/a | —N/a | —N/a | —N/a | —N/a |
| TVNZ | 1989 | TV One | Channel 2 | —N/a | —N/a | —N/a | —N/a | —N/a | —N/a | —N/a | —N/a | —N/a | —N/a |
| TVNZ | 1995 | TV One | TV2 | —N/a | —N/a | —N/a | —N/a | —N/a | —N/a | —N/a | —N/a | —N/a | —N/a |
| TVNZ | 2007 | TV One | TV2 | TVNZ 6 | —N/a | —N/a | —N/a | —N/a | —N/a | —N/a | TVNZ Sport Extra | —N/a | —N/a |
| TVNZ | 2008 | TV One | TV2 | TVNZ 6 | TVNZ 7 | —N/a | —N/a | —N/a | —N/a | —N/a | TVNZ Sport Extra | —N/a | —N/a |
| TVNZ | 2010 | TV One | TV2 | TVNZ 6 | TVNZ 7 | —N/a | —N/a | —N/a | —N/a | —N/a | —N/a | TVNZ Heartland | —N/a |
| TVNZ | 2011 | TV One | TV2 | U | TVNZ 7 | —N/a | —N/a | —N/a | —N/a | —N/a | —N/a | TVNZ Heartland | TVNZ Kidzone24 |
| TVNZ | 2012 | TV One | TV2 | U | TV One Plus 1 | —N/a | —N/a | —N/a | —N/a | —N/a | —N/a | TVNZ Heartland | TVNZ Kidzone24 |
| TVNZ | 2013 | TV One | TV2 | TV One Plus 1 | TV2+1 | —N/a | —N/a | —N/a | —N/a | —N/a | —N/a | TVNZ Heartland | TVNZ Kidzone24 |
| TVNZ | 2014 | TV One | TV2 | TV One Plus 1 | TV2+1 | —N/a | —N/a | —N/a | —N/a | —N/a | —N/a | TVNZ Heartland | TVNZ Kidzone24 |
| TVNZ | 2015 | TV One | TV2 | TV One Plus 1 | TV2+1 | —N/a | —N/a | TVNZ Pop-up | —N/a | —N/a | —N/a | —N/a | TVNZ Kidzone24 |
| TVNZ | 2016 | TV One | TV2 | TV One Plus 1 | TV2+1 | —N/a | —N/a | Duke | —N/a | —N/a | —N/a | —N/a | —N/a |
| TVNZ | 2016 | TVNZ 1 | TVNZ 2 | TVNZ 1+1 | TVNZ 2+1 | —N/a | —N/a | TVNZ Duke | —N/a | —N/a | —N/a | —N/a | —N/a |
| TVNZ | 2018 | TVNZ 1 | TVNZ 2 | TVNZ 1+1 | TVNZ 2+1 | —N/a | —N/a | TVNZ Duke | TVNZ Games Extra | —N/a | —N/a | —N/a | —N/a |
| TVNZ | 2018 | TVNZ 1 | TVNZ 2 | TVNZ 1+1 | TVNZ 2+1 | —N/a | —N/a | TVNZ Duke | —N/a | —N/a | —N/a | —N/a | —N/a |
| TVNZ | 2020 | TVNZ 1 | TVNZ 2 | TVNZ 1+1 | TVNZ 2+1 | —N/a | —N/a | TVNZ Duke | —N/a | TVNZ Duke+1 | —N/a | —N/a | —N/a |
| TVNZ | 2022 | TVNZ 1 | TVNZ 2 | TVNZ Duke | TVNZ 2+1 | TVNZ 1+1 | TVNZ Duke+1 | —N/a | —N/a | —N/a | —N/a | —N/a | —N/a |

=== Formation ===
TVNZ was created in February 1980, through the merger of Television One and South Pacific Television (which was renamed TV2). Until January 1989, it was paired with Radio New Zealand as the Broadcasting Corporation of New Zealand (BCNZ).

The broadcaster was initially based in Television One's former headquarters at the Avalon television centre in Lower Hutt, with TV One broadcasting out of Avalon and TV2 broadcasting out of Auckland. However over the course of the 1980s, operations were gradually moved to Auckland. In 1989, TVNZ moved to a new television centre in central Auckland.

In preparation for the launch of TV3, TVNZ became a profit-oriented state-owned enterprise in 1988.

Broadcasting in New Zealand was deregulated in 1989. Private broadcasters were allowed to operate in competition to TVNZ, and Radio New Zealand was split off from TVNZ, becoming a separate company. The Broadcasting Act 1989 also established the organisation now called NZ on Air which funds public broadcasting and independent media production in New Zealand.

In 1990, TVNZ competed with TV3 with an advertising campaign backed by "expensive imported programmes" and local sports coverage.

=== Commercial agreements ===
A first-right supply agreement with Channel 4 was signed in October 2000. This disabled TV4 from having access to further programmes from the British channel's catalogue, although it still had a few programmes stocked at the time. The first programmes were set to come to the TVNZ channels within a two-month window.

In October 2002, it signed an agreement with The Walt Disney Company, displacing TV3 from its free-to-air rights.

=== Role as public broadcaster ===
The Labour-led government under Helen Clark from 1999 to 2008 pursued a programme of public broadcasting reforms. New Zealand's wide-ranging adoption of neoliberal policies in the mid-1980s and 1990s had large sections of the state sector privatised. As a state owned enterprise, TVNZ enjoyed enormous commercial success under CEO Julian Mounter (sustaining two-thirds of the overall audience share) and paid the Crown substantial dividends (over $250 million between 1989 and 1999). However, the commercial success had been achieved through an unabashed pursuit of ratings through populist and tabloid content, and prior to the 1999 election the National-led government was evidently positioning TVNZ for commercialisation Labour-led administrations since 1999 explicitly recognised the market failures of a wholly commercial broadcasting sector (e.g. saturation-level advertising, low levels of local content, heavy reliance on cheap imports and a disregard for quality genres and in-depth news and current affairs) and re-emphasised television's cultural and democratic functions in their policy thinking.

The Clark government's highest profile broadcasting reform to date was the restructuring of TVNZ as a Crown entity in 2003. This introduced a dual remit whereby the broadcaster had to maintain its commercial performance (continuing dividend payments to the Crown) while simultaneously implementing a new public service Charter.

The TVNZ Charter would require the negotiation and reconciliation of potentially contradictory commercial and public service imperatives. The final version of the TVNZ Charter included a range of public service objectives and expectations.

However, this dual remit precluded any transformation of TVNZ into fully-fledged public service broadcaster, and TVNZ's efforts to balance its pursuit of commercial performance and Charter objectives were soon being criticised. Despite some investment in local content, including new documentaries and discussion programmes, the content on TV One and TV2 remained similar to the pre-charter schedules, with a continuing high proportion of light entertainment and reality-TV shows.

TVNZ continues to pay dividends to the Crown. However, from 2006 until 2009 TVNZ received $15.11 million each year from Government to assist it with fulfilling Charter obligations. There was much debate about the initial secrecy surrounding funding allocations and the programmes supported. The allocation of $5 million toward coverage of the 2008 Olympics, the rights for which are secured by a competitive tender between broadcasters, was possibly the most controversial. In 2009 the Government gave control of that funding to funding agency NZ On Air. NZ On Air announced the creation of the contestable "Platinum Fund" in April 2009, setting aside the $15.11 million for high quality drama, documentary and other programme types. Following the election of a National Party-led government under John Key in 2008, the Charter was abolished in favour of a return to the 1990s model of a full commercial broadcaster.

There is much debate on the future of TVNZ, which focuses on the nature of public service broadcasting and its commercial role. An example was in a memo called A More Public Broadcaster written by outgoing Chief Executive Ian Fraser to the board of TVNZ in October 2005, was obtained and released by Green MP Sue Kedgley. The memo outlined three (four) options.

These were:

- TV One as a fully non-commercial network, like ABC in Australia, charged with delivering Charter values, and possibly merging with Radio New Zealand and Māori Television
- TV One a semi-commercial broadcaster with no more than six minutes of advertisements an hour like SBS in Australia
- TV One and TV2 remaining unchanged, but two new public service channels being broadcast via digital television.
- TV One and TV2 are now fully commercial with 15 – 20 minutes of ads per hour, plus ads overplayed over programmes.

On 15 February 2006, a group of 31 prominent New Zealanders signed an open letter, published as a full-page newspaper advertisement, calling for better quality programmes and less advertising on TVNZ. These included mountaineer Sir Edmund Hillary, and former governors-general Sir Michael Hardie Boys and Dame Catherine Tizard. However, they were accused of being out of touch and nostalgic for local programmes from the 1970s and 1980s, when New Zealand had only one or two TV channels. While the Broadcasting Minister, Steve Maharey, ruled out turning TVNZ into an entirely non-commercial broadcaster, on 25 February 2006, he stated that the Labour Government was "pretty much settled" on the introduction of two new free-to-air, non-commercial channels available via digital television. One screening high-end international documentaries, re-runs of One News and minority programmes with a high local content, and another, primarily for children, screening serious drama and arts at night. These channels would eventually become known as TVNZ 7 and TVNZ 6 respectively.

=== Digital era ===
In early 2006, TVNZ purchased Harmonic branded H.262 encoding equipment for the upcoming Freeview DTH service, which is an Electra 1000 on-the-fly video re-encoder.

On 14 November 2006, TVNZ announced plans to launch two commercial-free digital channels. The first, with the working title TVNZ News 24, would feature news, sport and special interest content, and be launched in late 2007. This would be followed by a channel featuring children's, families', arts and documentary programming, with the working title of TVNZ Home, in early 2008. While 80 per cent of the programming would be local content, 70 per cent of this would consist of repeats from TVNZ's existing channels or its archive.

In April 2008, TVNZ made another purchase of more H.264 encoding equipment for the upcoming Freeview HD DTT service, which are the Electra 7000 for HD and Electra 5400 for SD on-the-fly video re-encoders. The proposal was criticised by TV3, which accused the Government of "bailing out" TVNZ and argued that the money would be better spent on new programming. Although Sue Kedgely welcomed the decision to make the channels (including children's programming) commercial-free, she accused the Government of tight-fistedness.

In late 2011, TVNZ and its pay-TV rival Sky Network Television announced the joint venture Igloo, which is to provide a low-cost pay-TV service for households not currently covered by Freeview or Sky. Igloo closed in 2017.

In mid 2013, TVNZ changed its on-screen branding to a more flat, modern look. TVNZ went fully digital in December 2013, with the accompanying shutdown of the analogue transmitters to free up spectrum for telecommunications use.

In January 2017 TVNZ launched their 'New Blood Web Series Competition' supported by NZ On Air. The competition is calling for aspiring content creators to submit a web series pilot episode. The winner will receive $100,000 to make a complete web series, which will launch through TVNZ's online channels.

=== Proposed merger ===
Renewing previous debate about the role of TVNZ as a commercial broadcaster, the Sixth Labour Government announced a proposal to disestablish TVNZ and Radio New Zealand (RNZ) and establish a single public media entity. The television and radio broadcaster would have a public-service role to provide content on a variety of platforms, "some of which may be advertising free". By mid-March 2021, the merger proposal was still in its early stages.

In late December 2021, former National Party Member of Parliament Simon Power was appointed as the chief executive of TVNZ. Power had recently stepped down as acting chief of Westpac Bank when the bank appointed Catherine McGrath as chief executive in November 2021. Power assumed the position in March 2022, on the 4th April 2023 Power Resigned effective from the 30th June 2023 with Brent McAnulty taking over as acting CEO.

In mid-June 2022, Broadcasting Minister Willie Jackson introduced draft legislation to TVNZ and fellow public broadcaster Radio New Zealand into a new non-profit autonomous Crown entity called Aotearoa New Zealand Public Media (ANZPM), commencing 1 March 2023. Under the proposed legislation, both TVNZ and RNZ would become subsidiaries of the ANZPM, which would be supported by both government and commercial funding. The new organisation would also be headed by a board and be governed by a media charter outlining its goals and responsibilities including editorial independence. The Government has also allocated NZ$370m over four years in operating expenditure and $306m in capital funding from the 2022 New Zealand budget for funding the ANZPM.

On 8 February 2023, Prime Minister Chris Hipkins announced that the merger of TVNZ and RNZ into ANZPM would be scrapped due to a shift in government priorities towards "cost of living issues." He confirmed that RNZ and NZ On Air would receive additional government funding. Prior to the public media entity's cancellation, the two public broadcasters had spent a total of NZ$1,023,701 on ANZPM; with TVNZ spending NZ$592,424 in the period between 1 March and 31 October 2022.

=== 2024–present ===
In February 2024, Jodi O'Donnell became CEO of TVNZ.

In early March 2024, due to financial difficulties from competing large Internet companies such as Netflix and YouTube and a decline in advertisement revenue, the state-owned broadcaster proposed ending television programmes Fair Go and Sunday along with 1News' midday and late night news segments. In addition, TVNZ has proposed 68 job cuts (roughly 9 percent of its staff). In response to the proposed cuts and layoffs, the Better Public Media Trust has proposed funding TVNZ through a $60 annual levy on individuals or alternatively a digital services levy.

On 13 March 2024, TVNZ employees affiliated with the E tū union objected to TVNZ's proposal to slash almost 70 jobs. E tū negotiations specialist Michael Wood said that E tū members were unhappy with the proposed restructure and "shoddy" consultation process. In early May 2024, E Tū filed a case against TVNZ with the Employment Relations Authority (ERA), arguing that the broadcaster failed to follow the consultation requirements of its collective agreement with its members. On 6 May, TVNZ executives, staff members, and Wood submitted evidence during an investigative meeting at ERA's Auckland office. During the meeting, a Fair Go employee said that the company had not raised the issues of job cuts and programme cancellations during staff meetings on TVNZ's future direction. On 10 May, ERA ordered TVNZ to enter into mediation with the E tū union over THE staff redundancies caused by its programming cutbacks. TVNZ issued a statement voicing disappointment with ERA's decision and that "we will now take the time to consider the decision and our next steps." On 31 May, Employment Court Chief Judge Christina Inglis dismissed TVNZ's appeal against the Employment Relations Authority's ruling and ruled that TVNZ had to enter into collective bargaining with its employees.

On 7 October 2024, TVNZ's management proposed several measures to find NZ$30 million in cost-savings including closing down the 1News website by February 2025, investing more in its TVNZ+ streaming service and reorienting its youth-oriented platform Re:News to focus on video storytelling. On 29 October, TVNZ abandoned plans to shut down its 1News website but proposed expanding the news content of TVNZ+. On 7 November 2024, TVNZ proposed cutting 90 roles and creating 41 new roles in order to save NZ$30 million. This includes cutting several roles on its Breakfast and Seven Sharp current affairs shows.

In late March 2026, The New Zealand Herald reported that TVNZ was proposing cutting its Good Sorts evening news segment and its Re:News youth brand due to a challenging advertising market and a shift towards investing in digital technology.

== Governance ==
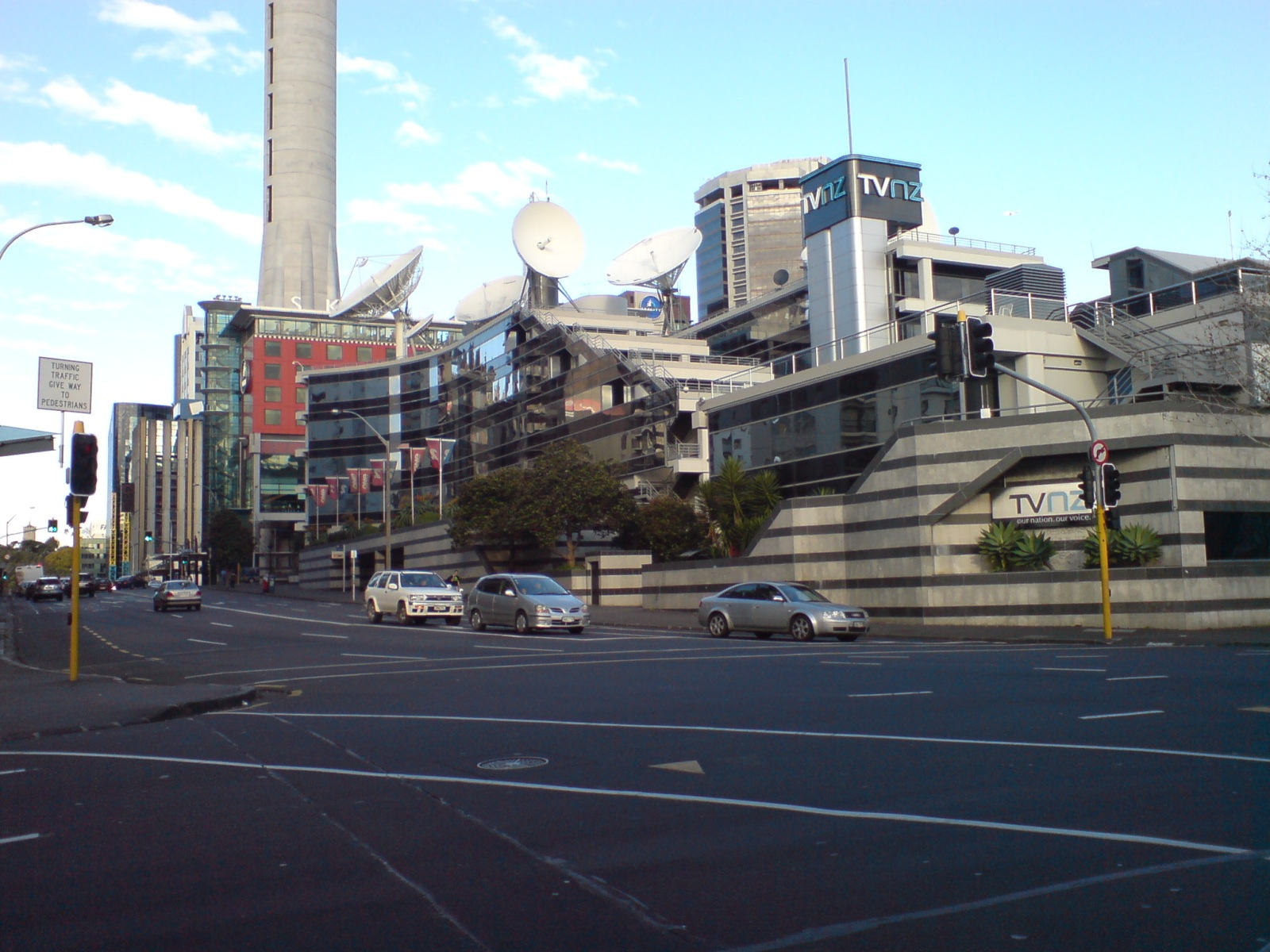
TVNZ headquarters in Auckland.

=== Board of directors ===
The TVNZ Board is the governing board of Television New Zealand. It is appointed by the Minister of Broadcasting and Media, who was at the time Willie Jackson. As of August 2017, the directors are: the chairperson Dame Therese Walsh (Wellington), deputy chairperson Andy Coupe (Hamilton), Abby Foote (Christchurch), Cameron Harland (Lower Hutt), Toko Kapea (Wellington), Kevin Malloy (Auckland), Julia Raue (Auckland) and Susan Turner (Auckland). Former board members include Roger MacDonnell (2010–2016).

=== Charter ===
The Fifth Labour Government introduced a "TVNZ Charter" in 2002. This was a list of objectives for TVNZ which specified it must broadcast a wide variety of New Zealand-made content; the broadcaster was given public responsibility to provide news, drama, documentaries and "promote understanding of the diversity of cultures". In 2008 the Government announced that the broadcaster was to become "more public-service" like. TVNZ responded by launching two commercial free channels; TVNZ 6 and TVNZ 7. By 2011 Prime Minister John Key announced the closure of these channels. 6 in 2011, and 7 in mid-2012, with much of their content put into TVNZ Heartland and TVNZ Kidzone24 which are only available behind a Sky TV paywall. The Fifth National Government abolished the Charter in 2011. Political opponents accused the Government of reducing TVNZ's commitments as a public broadcaster.

== Channels ==
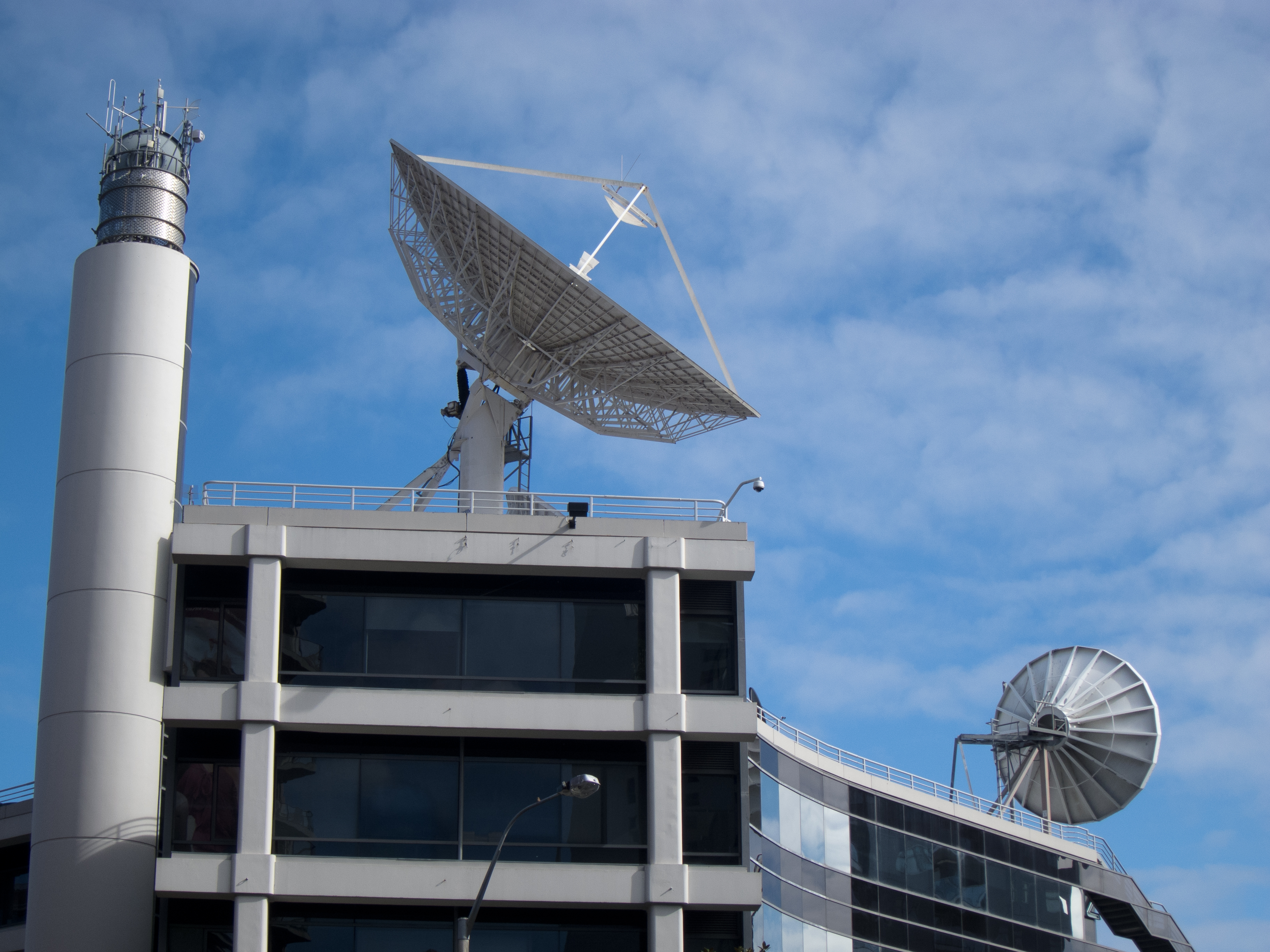
Satellite dish on roof of TVNZ Building, Hobson Street, Auckland CBD

=== TVNZ 1 ===
TVNZ 1 is TVNZ's flagship channel. Launched on 1 June 1960, it has a broad range of programming, including news, sport, food, drama, and comedy. Its news service is 1News and its sports division is 1 Sport.

The channel, once the traditional home of television sport, has since lost the rights to most of the world's main sporting events, including the Olympics, and All Blacks test matches to pay television competitor Sky. TVNZ's outside broadcasting division, Moving Pictures was established in 1962. It provided the production facilities for such events with 8 outside broadcast trucks across the country. This wound up in the mid-2000s after then-Australian owned outside broadcaster Onsite Broadcasting started to expand and took the OB contract off Moving Pictures for the filming of major sports for Sky TV. OSB was then owned by Sky before it was sold to American OB provider NEP. TVNZ 1 also broadcasts rural focused programmes such as Country Calendar and Rural Delivery, Māori community presentations such as Waka Huia, Marae Investigates and Te Karere, a daily Māori language news bulletin, and shows for minorities, such as Attitude, Neighbourhood, A Taste of Home and Tagata Pasifika. Elsewhere TVNZ 1 specialises in food shows, including the locally produced MasterChef, and international shows, mostly from the BBC and Network Ten Australia.

=== TVNZ 2 ===
TVNZ 2 targets a younger audience than TVNZ 1. Launched on 30 June 1975, its line up consists of dramas, sitcoms, comedies, children's programming, and reality shows, most of which are produced in New Zealand or imported from the United States.

Locally produced content includes Shortland Street, Motorway Patrol and What Now, and international shows (which are predominantly American) include The Big Bang Theory and The Walking Dead. TVNZ 2 is sold by TVNZ as the "home of entertainment".

=== TVNZ Duke ===
TVNZ Duke was launched on 20 March 2016. It initially broadcast between the hours of 6pm and midnight, although it occasionally screened live sport events outside of these hours. On average, the channel broadcasts from 10:30 am until late on weekdays, and from 7 am until late on weekends. It screens programming for a male audience with comedy, drama and factual series such as Two and a Half Men, Everybody Hates Chris and River Monsters. It also screens a number of sporting events such as the Men's and Women's Hockey Pro Leagues and the Dream11 Super Smash domestic cricket tournament.

=== Timeshift channels ===
TVNZ broadcasts timeshift channels of its three television channels. These broadcast the Auckland feed, delayed by one hour. TVNZ 1+1 was launched on 1 July 2012, replacing TVNZ 7. TVNZ 2+1 was launched on 1 September 2013, replacing TVNZ U. TVNZ Duke+1 was launched on 17 November 2020.

== Other services ==
Internationally, TVNZ has helped provide television services in Pacific Island nations such as the Cook Islands, Fiji, and the Solomon Islands. While TVNZ provides much of the programming, scheduling and continuity are done locally.

Because of its history TVNZ has inherited and developed its own services in the production and broadcasting services area. These include The New Zealand Television Archive, production facilities, television school.

=== TVNZ Archive ===
The TVNZ Archive collection contains over 600,000 hours of television spanning almost 55 years of New Zealand's public television history. It includes iconic New Zealand content such as documentaries, dramas, sports programmes and every TVNZ news broadcast from December 1986 to 2014. In a 2014 briefing to Minister Craig Foss, the Ministry for Culture and Heritage noted that the long-term preservation of the TVNZ Archive collection did not align with broadcaster's business needs and that transferring the collection to the Crown would allow for the proper preservation of the collection. Both the Ministry and TVNZ explicitly wanted to ensure the archive was preserved and that it was made increasingly available for re-use through online streaming and other means. On 1 August 2014 guardianship of the archive collection was transferred to the Crown. Budget 2014 included $24.4 million to facilitate the transfer and ongoing management of the archive. Of that, $11.32 million was for the purchase of the TVNZ Archive facility at Avalon – including land, building, fixtures, fittings and plant. $5.066 million was for the depreciation and capital charge of the facility, and $8 million (spread over four years) was for the ongoing management of the archive. The building and land were transferred to the Department of Internal Affairs and the Ministry for Culture and Heritage took over guardianship of the collection. The Ministry appointed Ngā Taonga Sound & Vision as the initial archive manager.

=== TVNZ+ ===
TVNZ+ is Television New Zealand's on-demand streaming platform, TVNZ OnDemand was launched 20 March 2007, and is available on PlayStation 3 and PlayStation 4 via the TVNZ app on PlayStation Network for New Zealanders. It is also available on FreeviewPlus, iOS, Android, Xbox One and Windows 10. The content uses geotargeting for New Zealand only connections via a US-based Brightcove media company using the Akamai RTMP network, with some local content being made available to an international audience via their YouTube channel. At the end of 2012, the contract with Brightcove was expanded to include streaming to iOS devices via the Akamai HLS network. From 2012, TVNZ OnDemand began uploading episodes of select shows prior to their airing on TVNZ channels and usually within a day of their original overseas airings (although sometimes this was weeks or months after their international airing). In September 2014, it was announced that episodes of seventeen shows would be uploaded within a day of their airings in the US, coinciding with the 2014–2015 season. One of the shows, Manhattan Love Story was cancelled by the US network ABC, but episodes continued to be uploaded to TVNZ OnDemand in line with their intended US airings, making TVNZ the de facto original broadcaster of the series. On 1 May 2016 (01.06 am), when TVNZ Kidzone (channel version) closed it is now on TVNZ OnDemand with lot of the shows to watch (it is still use the former channel programs). On June 13 the service rebranded to TVNZ+ after on Friday 10 TVNZ sent an email out to staff saying "exciting upgrade coming for TVNZ OnDemand."

=== Teletext ===
TVNZ began a teletext service in 1984 originally with the intention to help New Zealand's deaf community get improved access to news and information. A captioning service was available for certain television shows and could be accessed by browsing to page 801. The TVNZ Teletext service could be received on all TVNZ channels and the TVNZ service could be received on TV3 including captioning of some TV3 shows. Trackside also operated a Teletext service called TAB Text which only displayed the racing pages of Teletext.

A Teletext capable television was usually required to receive Teletext. With the arrival of digital television services such as Freeview, Teletext could be received through a Freeview decoder. In this case captions were normally accessed by subtitle button on a Freeview remote.

In December 2012, TVNZ announced the closure of their Teletext service from 3 April 2013. The captioning service would however continue to be available. TVNZ cited the reasons for the closure due to a decline in use particularly since most services are now available from the TVNZ website or other websites.

=== TiVo ===
On 26 March 2009 TVNZ announced that it had acquired a 33% stake in Hybrid Television Services (67% owned by Australia's Seven Media Group, later Seven West Media and Seven Media Group). Hybrid TV is the exclusive licensee of TiVo products in Australia and New Zealand. On the same day it was announced that TiVo would be arriving in New Zealand by Christmas 2009 (Hybrid launched it in Australia in July 2008). The TiVo service was discontinued on 31 October 2017.

=== Discontinued services ===
Between 1995 and 1997, TVNZ operated a network of regional TV stations under the 'Horizon Pacific' name and through a subsidiary called Horizon Pacific Television. Its broadcast content included BBC World and NZ documentary programming. The network consisted of newly formed stations ATV in Auckland, Coast to Coast in Hamilton, Capital Television in Wellington and Southern Television in Dunedin. TVNZ subsequently also purchased CTV, based in Christchurch. CTV continues to broadcast, but is no longer owned by TVNZ.

Horizon Pacific Television logos for ATV, Coast to Coast, Capital and Southern TV

Horizon Pacific was replaced by a local 'free to air' version of the music video channel MTV, based on MTV's UK service and local programming, although the channel was dropped in 1998. Prior to MTV's demise, TVNZ had bought the channel's competitor, Max TV.

TVNZ also operated a satellite services division organising and downlink facilities and across the globe, but this service was wound down in 2005.

TVNZ operated TVNZ 6 from 2007 to 2011. TVNZ 6 was a digital-only, commercial-free television channel. It was available in 60.3% of New Zealand homes on the Freeview and Sky Television Digital platforms. TVNZ 6 was on air daily from 6 am to midnight.

TVNZ 7 was launched in March 2008 and was a commercial-free news and information channel. It was available via the Freeview and Sky platforms. The New Zealand Government, under Prime Minister John Key and Broadcasting Minister Jonathan Coleman decided to discontinue funding for TVNZ 7. The final broadcast ended at midnight on 30 June 2012. TVNZ 7 was replaced with time shift channel TV One Plus 1 (now TVNZ 1 +1).

TVNZ launched U on 13 March 2011. U was a 24-hour youth orientated channel available via both Freeview and Sky. TVNZ U was launched to fill the gap when TVNZ 6 closed in 2011. TVNZ U specialised in musical tastes, reality, gaming, fashion and informative youth orientated documentaries.

On 29 July 2013, TVNZ announced that the channel would be closed on 31 August 2013 and be replaced by a time shift channel, TV2+1 (now TVNZ 2 +1).

TVNZ Heartland was a pay-TV channel that launched on the Sky Television platform on 1 June 2010. It was TVNZ's first channel available exclusively on a pay-TV platform and featured 100% New Zealand made programming, mostly sourced from the TVNZ archives. The channel closed in May 2015.

TVNZ ceased delivering its Pacific Service in October 2015. The service was taken over by Pacific Cooperation Broadcasting Limited, who expanded the service in February 2016 as Pasifika TV. The service became a collaboration of all major New Zealand broadcasters, as opposed to just TVNZ. The transition of the service meant that it was now funded by Ministry of Foreign Affairs and Trade, and the objectives were broadened beyond supplying content, to focus on strengthening partnerships in the Pacific by building capacity and capabilities amongst the respective Pacific free to air broadcasters.

== Transmission network ==
=== High Definition ===
TVNZ has offered HD broadcasts since July/August 2008, when the 2008 Summer Olympics were broadcast in High Definition. The service is offered on the Freeview|HD platform, using DVB-T transmission. Only TV One and TV2 are offered in HD, and the majority of programming is still up-converted from Standard Definition. From 1 July 2009 the HD versions of TV One and TV2 became available to Sky TV subscribers who have the MySky HDi decoders. Content on the HD versions of TV One and 2 are the same as the Standard Definition versions however when watching certain shows that broadcast in High Definition the HD logo is displayed next to the channel logo, this logo is not seen when watching the same show on the Standard Definition versions of TV1 and 2.

TVNZ has adopted 1080i as their HD broadcast format.

=== Kordia, formerly BCL, TVNZ's transmission partner ===
TVNZ's transmission network is operated by Kordia, formerly a subsidiary of TVNZ known as Broadcast Communications Limited until 2006. The company owns and operates the terrestrial transmission network used for broadcast of all major terrestrial television networks in New Zealand, including Discovery New Zealand and Sky Open – TVNZ's major competitors, along with other voice and data telecommunications services.

=== Geographic history ===
TVNZ's primary television channel TV One is provided as four distinct terrestrial feeds, localising to viewers within and around the Auckland, Waikato, Wellington and Christchurch regions. Localised satellite feeds were made available in 2010 to channel-locked SD receivers. Localised content currently only consists of targeted regional advertising spots toward the end of a commercial break. Localised regional news programming was discontinued in the late 1980s and all localised versions for TV2 were discontinued in the early 2000s in favour of only national advertising.

TVNZ's predecessor, NZBC started as distinct stations in Auckland, Wellington, Christchurch and Dunedin. Nationwide networked services were first introduced in July 1969 to broadcast the Apollo 11 landing footage, flown in specially from Australia, from Wellington simultaneously across all stations. However, the network was still incomplete, and in some places, outside broadcast vans were strategically placed to temporarily complete missing links. The network was fully completed in November that year. The original 1969 network linked Auckland to Dunedin via Wellington and Christchurch mainly used unidirectional microwave links, with off-air rebroadcasting used for linking in the reverse direction. By 1985, the network had been upgraded to a bidirectional microwave network extending from Maungataniwha in Northland to Obelisk in Central Otago. Broadcast relay stations served areas off the microwave network.

TVNZ also used to run telethons up until 1990 at locations around the country, viewers would be shown full coverage of the Telethon nearest their location. Originally when TVNZ began broadcasting TV One and TV2 on Sky Digital at the end of 2001 viewers would see only nationwide or Auckland advertisements when watching these channels through the Sky Digital service. In 2004 this was expanded to show one of three feeds for regional advertising spots targeting Auckland, Wellington or Christchurch with viewers outside of these regions seeing advertisements from the closest region. This was again dropped in March 2007 with a return to only nationwide advertising on TVNZ channels on Sky Digital before being reintroduced through the Freeview SD service. Regional advertising spots are only shown on TV One on both Digital and Analogue platforms however those that receive the HD version of TV One through their HD receiver will only see Auckland advertisements. Standard DVB satellite receivers will scan in all versions to be selected by the viewer.

Wellington-based Avalon Studios, long a nucleus of TV production in New Zealand, was finally put up for sale by TVNZ in 2011, with most of its remaining shows relocating to Auckland, completing a trend of northward drift by the broadcaster. TV production was spread evenly around the country in the 1970s, but according to Wellington-based TV personalities, the drift to Auckland began in 1980 with the formation of TVNZ, and the subsequent relocation of the TV One newsroom and headquarters to Auckland under then Prime Minister Rob Muldoon.

In Christchurch, the original TVNZ studios were located at Gloucester Street in the NZBC owned building used to broadcast 3YA and 3ZB. A 14-storey building was also built on Worcester Street as studios for various TVNZ shows, notable shows to be filmed here included What Now and The Son of a Gunn Show. In 1998 TVNZ closed its Christchurch studios. What Now was moved to the Wellington-based Avalon Studios for a few years but moved back to Christchurch to be filmed at the privately owned Whitebait studios. Prior to the 2011 Christchurch earthquake on 22 February, the Worcester Street building continued to house Christchurch radio stations previously owned by RNZ and now owned by NZME (formerly The Radio Network); stations included Newstalk ZB, Classic Hits 97.7 and 91ZM. The Gloucester Street building remained as Christchurch based newsroom for TVNZ until the building was badly damaged in the quake, and has since been demolished. The Worcester Street building was demolished on 5 August 2012 by implosion.

The Dunedin studios were used to film many iconic shows, such as Play School, University Challenge, Beauty and the Beast, and Spot On. When TVNZ scaled back its Dunedin studios in 1989, they were purchased by Ian Taylor, the founder of Animation Research and Taylormade Media.

=== DVB-S availability ===
TV One, TV2 and the hour delayed versions are available "in the clear" over DVB-S on Optus D1 as standard definition only. A Sky set-top box is not required, any satellite set-top box or tuner will work. However the high definition versions on DVB-S2 are scrambled and require a Sky Television H.264 set-top box such as MySky, which costs the price of a basic subscription plus addition MySky rental fee.

=== Civil Defence ===
TVNZ's functions are subject to lifeline utility requirements under NZ civil defence legislation. In practice, this status as a lifeline utility requires TVNZ to be able to function at least to a reduced level after an emergency, and to provide advice to civil defence authorities when requested.

=== Details prior to December 2013 digital switchover ===
==== Technical notes ====
New Zealand uses PAL B (7 MHz channel spacing) on VHF, and PAL G (8 MHz channel spacing) on UHF.

- While Australia also uses PAL B on VHF, the frequency allocations of NZ differ somewhat from Australia.
- Australia uses PAL B (7 MHz channel spacing) for UHF, so most UHF channels are on different frequencies.
- For stereo sound New Zealand uses NICAM on a non-standard offset from the monaural FM audio signal, while Australia uses the standard European offset for A2 Stereo. With NICAM being a digital signal, it has a higher chance of drop out over distance and from interference than A2 Stereo.
- Because of these differences, some Australian TV sets (when taken to NZ) are only capable of mono sound reproduction, and many VHF channels may not be received (properly) or come in at all.
- TVNZ (for historical and technical reasons) uses the greatest number of VHF frequencies in New Zealand.

==== NICAM stereo ====
New Zealand has a near nationwide implementation of NICAM stereo sound for TV One and TV2. NICAM stereo was first made available on TV2 in the Auckland region in 1989, also during the early 1990s Simulated Stereo was available in Wellington on TV2. NICAM stereo was not rolled out to the rest of the country or onto TV One until 1996 and for some regions (such as Southland) NICAM was not available until 2001. Rival network Three has offered NICAM stereo in all available regions since its launch in 1989; this is also the case with Prime TV. Stereo sound is available on all TVNZ channels if accessed through Sky Digital or Freeview.

== Visual identity ==
In 1980, TVNZ was launched as Television New Zealand, the logo consisted of four red stars overlapping together with the name below. Later in 1982, the logo changed to four four-pointed stars, forming the negative space of a red and blue octagon shape. 5 years later, the octagon was changed to blue and the stars are changed to red. In 1994, it changed the name to TVNZ, the logo consists of the letters TVNZ coloured in purple, red, green, and light blue. 10 years later, it consists of the name in a futuristic font with letters TV in black and letters NZ in light teal. Since 2016, TVNZ's logo consists of a blue spiral with the letters TVNZ in a lowercase ligature wordmark.

1980–1982

1982–1987

1987–1994

1994–2004

2004–2012

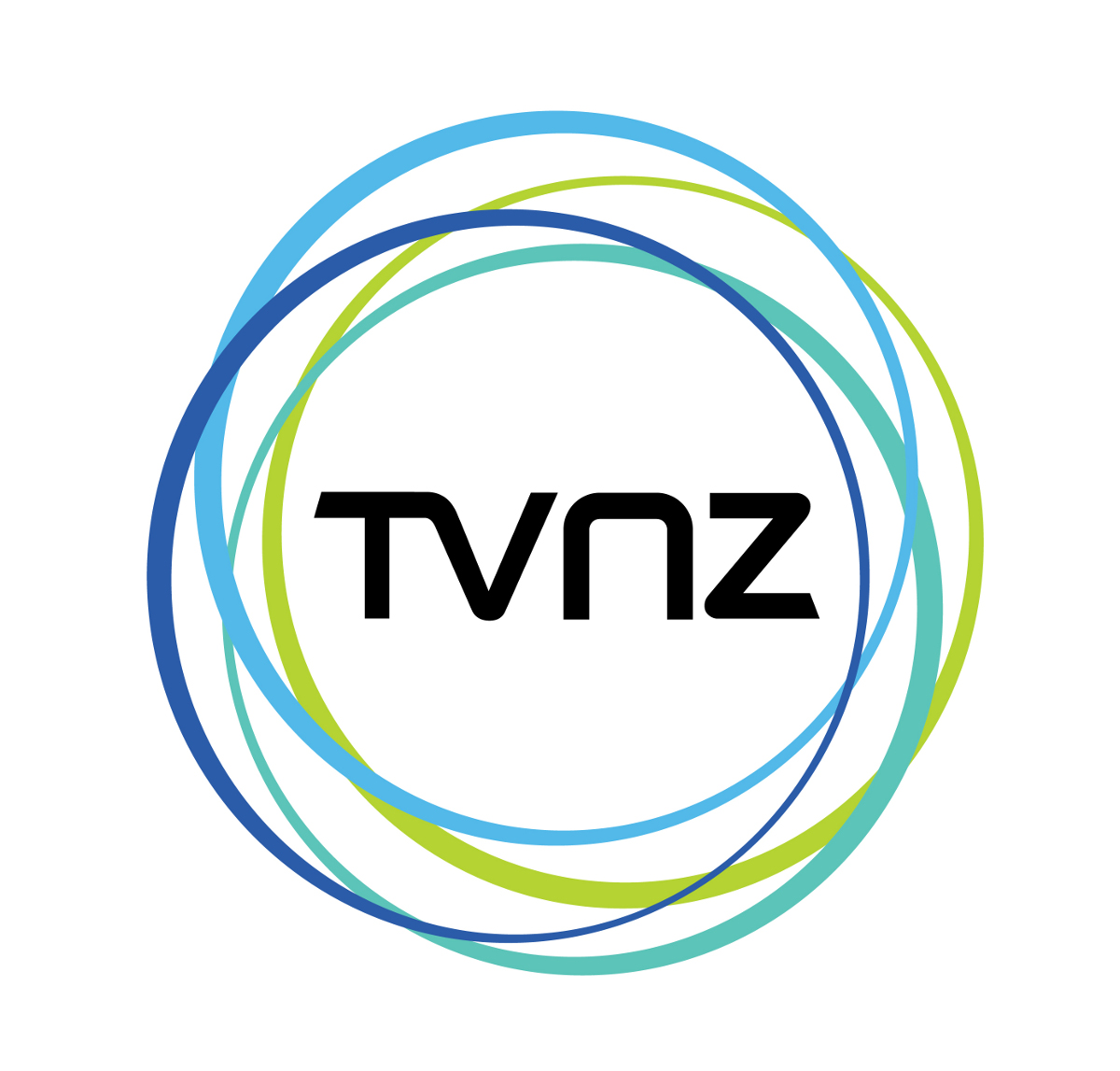
2012–2016

== Competitors ==
TVNZ's major competitors in the television market are

- Sky Free's Three, Bravo, Eden, Rush and Sky Open
- Whakaata Māori (Māori Television)

== Controversies ==
In addition to debates over whether TVNZ should be a public broadcaster or a commercial one, there have been other controversies.

=== 1990s ===
In 1996, the defamation case Television New Zealand Ltd v Quinn was decided at the Court of Appeal of New Zealand.

For 3 weeks in January–February 1999, John Hawkesby became a weekday newsreader for One News, replacing Richard Long (who moved to presenting weekend bulletins alongside Liz Gunn). The change was short-lived, and Hawkesby received a $5.2m payout.

=== 2000s ===
In 2000, the Broadcasting Standards Authority ruled against TVNZ over inaccuracies in a news story about the drug Lyprinol (an extract from the New Zealand green-lipped mussel), which was erroneously touted as a cure for cancer.

In 2004 current affairs veteran of 15 years Paul Holmes sparked a public outcry after he referred to United Nations Secretary-General Kofi Annan as a "cheeky darkie" on his radio show on Newstalk ZB and subsequently chose not to renew his contract at TVNZ.

Also in 2004 there was the public outcry over newsreader Judy Bailey's $800,000 salary package, negotiated with head of news and current affairs at TVNZ Bill Ralston, she finished her final 12-month contract the following year after 34 years working at the broadcaster.

=== 2010s ===
In late 2010, TVNZ garnered criticism over various comments made by Breakfast host Paul Henry. Henry had referred to Delhi Commonwealth Games organiser Sheila Dikshit as "the dip shit woman" and "Dick Shit", going on to state that "it's so appropriate, because she's Indian, so she'd be dick-in-shit wouldn't she, do you know what I mean? Walking along the street... she's just so funny, isn't she?" Henry also questioned whether the Governor-General of New Zealand Anand Satyanand was "even a New Zealander", going on to ask, "Are you going to choose a New Zealander who looks and sounds like a New Zealander this time ... are we going to go for someone who is more like a New Zealander this time?" Following widespread public complaints and official criticism, Henry was suspended from TVNZ for 2 weeks without pay, eventually resigning from the broadcaster. Henry's resignation polarised the New Zealand public, with supporters claiming he was a victim of political correctness, and critics accusing him of pandering to the lowest common denominator.

=== 2020s ===
In December 2021, food production company Talley's Group sued TVNZ and the journalist Thomas Mead for their reportage of the company's health and safety issues, alleging that the broadcaster had made a "series of false and defamatory broadcasts." On 17 December 2025, the case against TVNZ and Mead was dismissed by High Court Justice Pheroze Jagose, who found that a single broadcast in 2021 "incorrectly referred to insufficient emergency stop buttons" but that Talley's could not prove it had suffered any financial loss, as required by law. On 13 February 2026, Talley's appealed the High Court's decision dismissing their defamation case against TVNZ at the Court of Appeal. TVNZ has defended their coverage of Talley's workplace practices.

In September 2023, controversial anti-co-governance activist Julian Batchelor filed a defamation lawsuit against TVNZ and The Disinformation Project director Dr Sanjana Hattotuwa, disputing their assertions he had incited anti-Māori racism. He sought a payment of $50,000 and a public apology. Batchelor's legal action was funded by Canadian New Zealander billionaire and private equity investor Jim Grenon. A hearing took place at the Auckland District Court in December 2025, with broadcaster Peter Williams testifying during the proceedings. On 24 March 2026, Justice David Clark dismissed Batchelor's defamation claim against TVNZ and Dr Hattotuwa, ruling in favour of the broadcaster's defence based on truth, honest opinion and responsible communication.

In early May 2026, the Broadcasting Standards Authority (BSA) ruled that TVNZ had breached broadcasting standards when 1News aired a news broadcast item on 13 September 2025 by misrepresenting US President Donald Trump's comment "I couldn't care less" in response to a media question following the assassination of conservative American activist Charlie Kirk. The BSA ordered TVNZ to broadcast a statement on its 1News evening edition summarising the upheld aspects of the decision.
