= TVNZ Heartland =

New Zealand television channel

- Country: New Zealand
- Broadcast area: National
- Headquarters: Auckland, New Zealand

Programming
- Picture format: 16:9 (576i, SDTV)

Ownership
- Owner: TVNZ
- Sister channels: TV One; TV2; TVNZ Kidzone24

History
- Launched: 1 June 2010
- Closed: 31 May 2015

Links
- Website: TVNZ Heartland

Availability

Terrestrial
- DVB 256-QAM on band IV

TVNZ Heartland was a retro pay TV channel operated by TVNZ featuring only New Zealand made shows, mostly reruns of classic shows as well as more recent shows. While TVNZ channels are traditionally available free to air, TVNZ Heartland was only available to Sky Digital subscribers. The channel was broadcast on Sky Digital channel 17.

Heartland launched on 1 June 2010, 50 years to the day that TV broadcasting began in New Zealand. The first show introduced From the Archives, a compilation series of five decades of classic New Zealand TV shows.

In 2015, it was announced that TVNZ Heartland would permanently close down on 31 May that year, after TVNZ and Sky decided not to renew broadcast agreements.
