= List of number-one singles from the 2000s (New Zealand) =

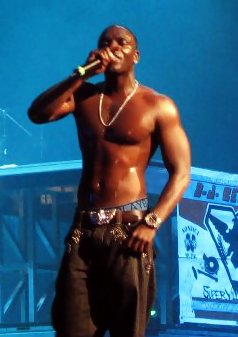
Akon achieved a total of seven number-ones this decade, the most of any artist: "Moonshine", "Lonely", "Smack That", "The Sweet Escape", "Don't Matter", "Bartender" and "Sexy Bitch".

In New Zealand, the Recording Industry Association of New Zealand (RIANZ) compiles the top forty singles chart each week. Sales of songs determined 75% of the sorting information, and radio airplay figures were responsible for 25%. From 18 April 2004 to 29 May 2007 the sales/radio airplay split was 50:50. Downloads of songs were included from 29 May 2007. The reporting period is from Monday to Sunday, with the week's chart published the next Monday. Before 18 April 2004, the chart week was from Sunday to Saturday, with the chart published on Sunday. Afterwards, the chart week was from Monday to Sunday, with the charts published on Monday. This meant there was a one-day charting period for 18 April 2004, with the next chart published on 19 April 2004. As a result, Usher spent three weeks and one day at number one with "Yeah!" instead of four complete weeks.

A total of 170 singles topped the chart in the 2000s, including 23 by New Zealand artists. Twenty artists had three or more number-one singles; the most successful was Akon, whose seven number-ones totalled twenty-three weeks on top of the chart. Chris Brown, Eminem, and the Black Eyed Peas each had five of their singles go to number one.

Scribe's double A-side "Stand Up"/"Not Many" spent the longest at number one, with twelve weeks. This is the most weeks at number one ever by a New Zealander, and the second most for any song, after Boney M.'s "Rivers of Babylon" had fourteen weeks in the top spot in 1978. "Axel F", by Crazy Frog, and "Brother", by Smashproof and Gin Wigmore each had eleven weeks at the top spot. "Brother" broke the record for the longest consecutive number-one reign by a New Zealand artist, previously set by "Sailing Away" by All of Us in 1986.

On 29 May 2006, "Crazy" by Gnarls Barkley replaced "Hips Don't Lie" by Shakira and Wyclef Jean at the top of the chart, and became the 500th number-one single in the RIANZ New Zealand Singles Chart's history.

The source for this decade is the Recorded Music NZ chart, the chart history of which can be found on the Recorded Music NZ website or Charts.nz.

* – Number-one single of the year (Note: Annual charts are sourced from the RIANZ website: "Annual Top 50 Singles Chart 2010")
† – Song of New Zealand origin (Note: Whether or not a song is of New Zealand origin is determined by the RMNZ)
‡ – Number-one single of the year, of New Zealand origin

== 2000 ==
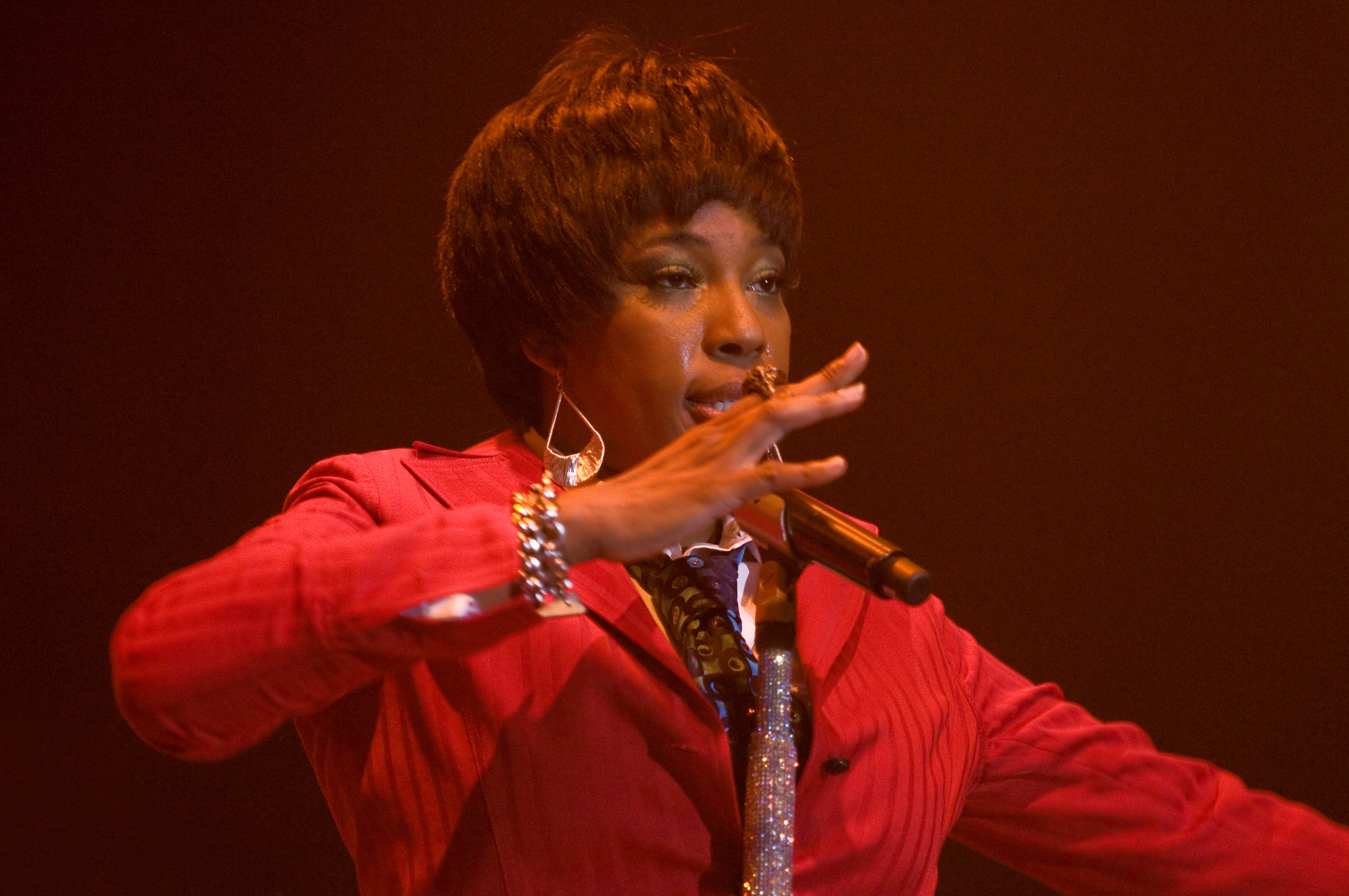
Macy Gray's "I Try" was number one for one week.

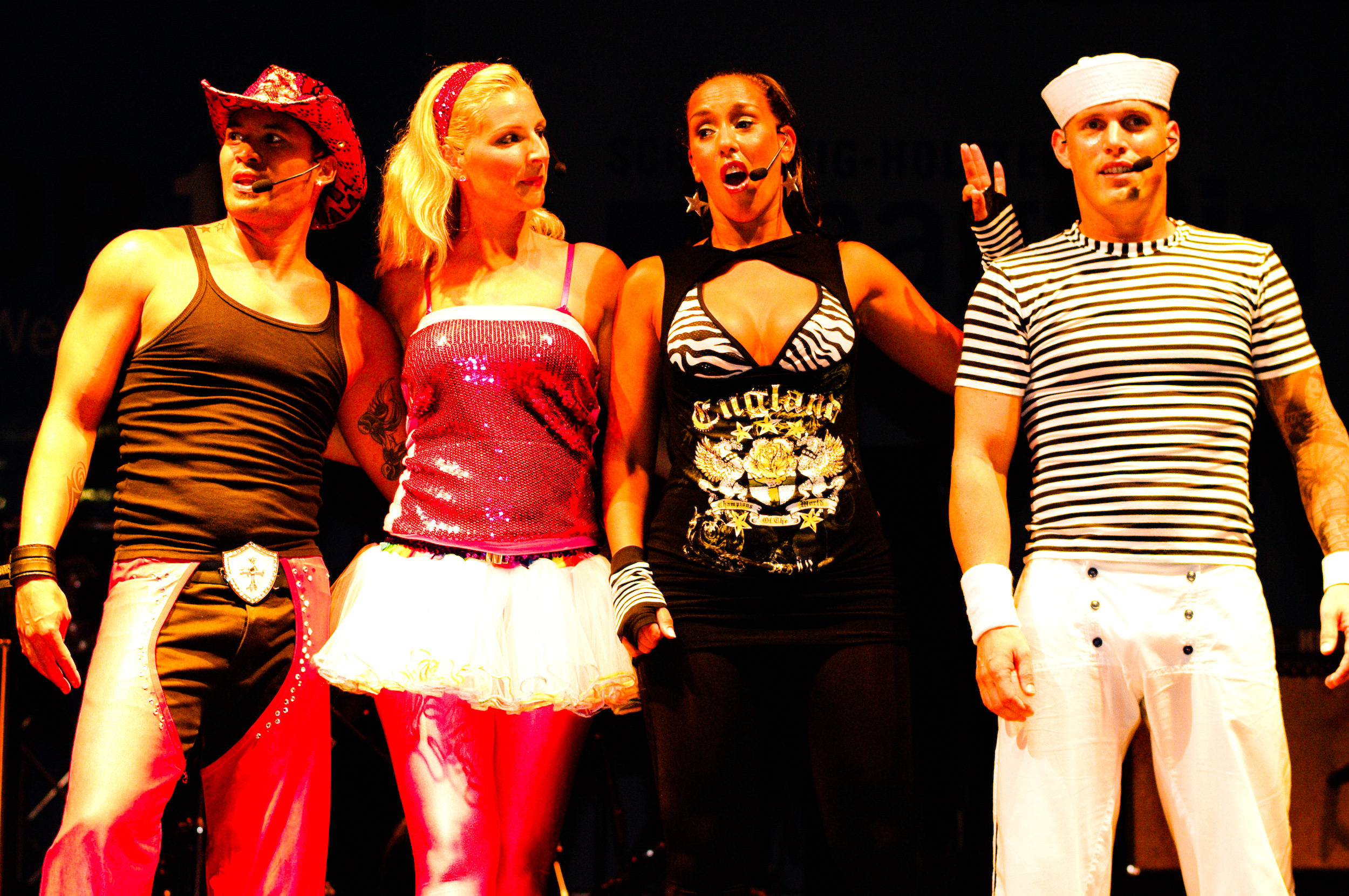
Vengaboys scored two chart-toppers this decade: "Kiss (When the Sun Don't Shine)" and "Shalala Lala".

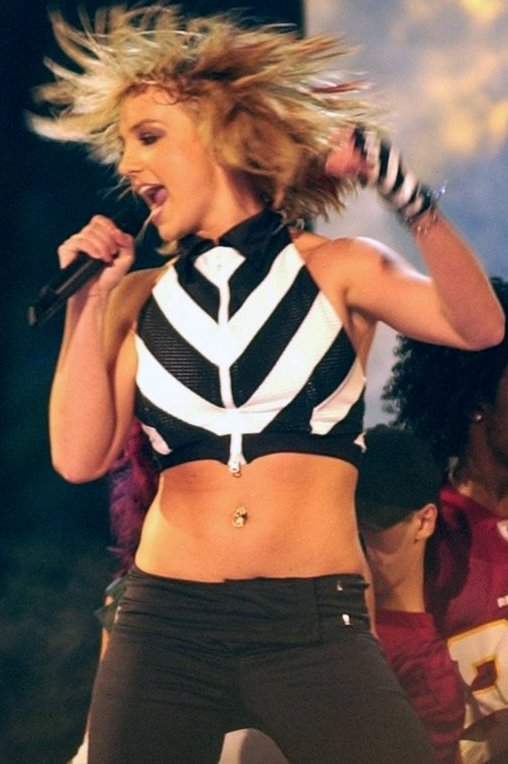
"Oops!... I Did It Again", by Britney Spears, spent one week at number one.

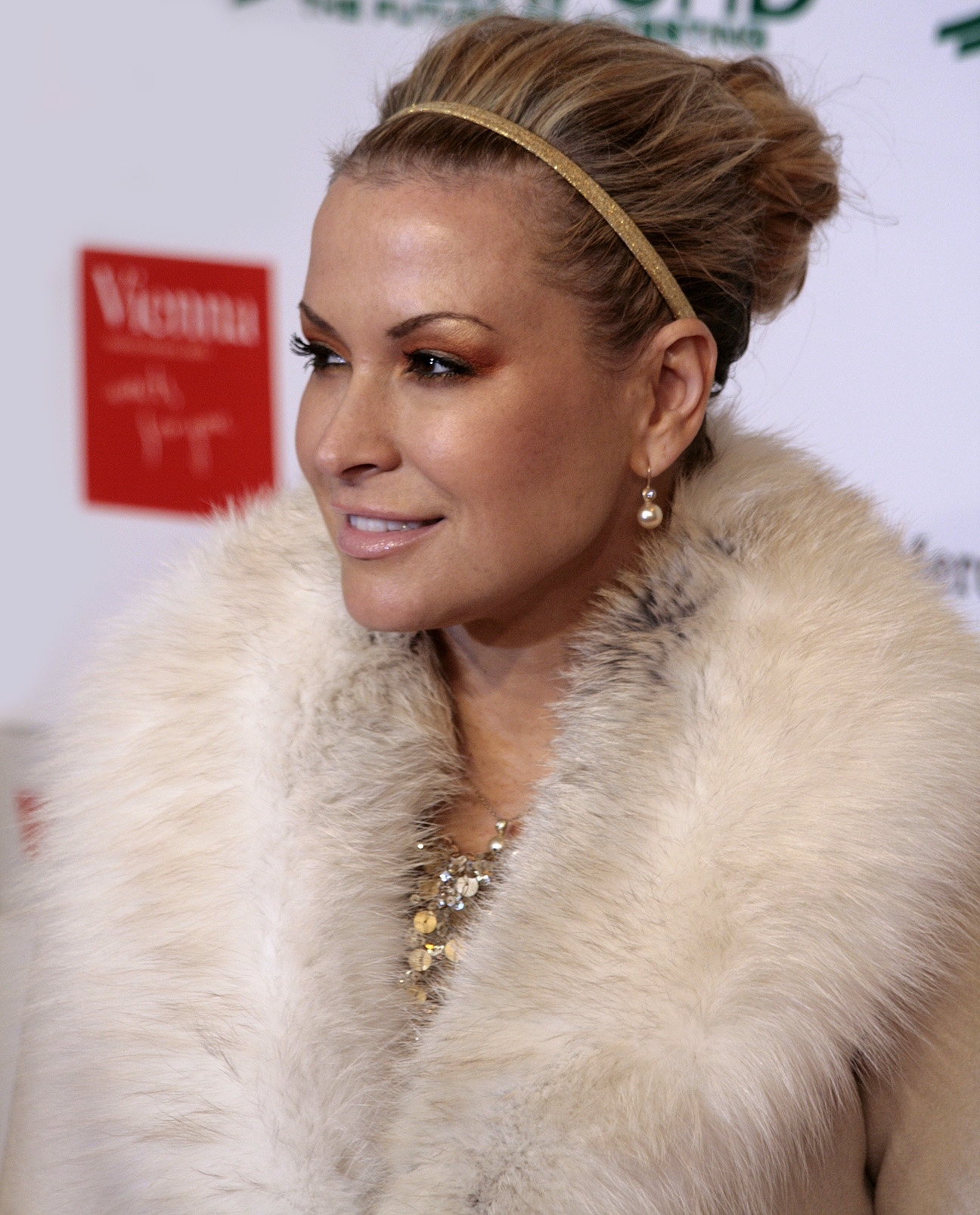
"I'm Outta Love" by Anastacia was the number-one single of 2000, after topping the chart for seven weeks.

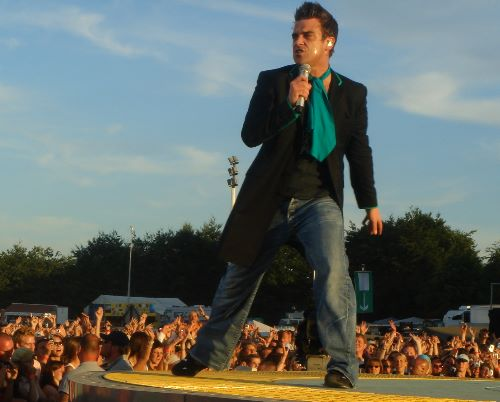
Robbie Williams' "Rock DJ" held the top spot for four weeks.

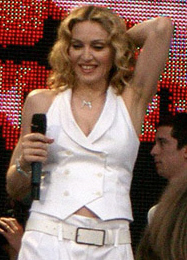
Madonna achieved her fourth and fifth number-one singles with "Music" and "Don't Tell Me".

Date	Artist	Single	Weeks at number one	Ref.
2 January	S Club 7	"S Club Party"	5 weeks (1 in 1999)	
9 January	S Club 7	"S Club Party"	5 weeks (1 in 1999)	
16 January	S Club 7	"S Club Party"	5 weeks (1 in 1999)	
23 January	S Club 7	"S Club Party"	5 weeks (1 in 1999)	
30 January	Macy Gray	"I Try"	1 week	
6 February	Christina Aguilera	"What a Girl Wants"	5 weeks	
13 February	Vengaboys	"Kiss (When the Sun Don't Shine)"	1 week	
20 February	Christina Aguilera	"What a Girl Wants"	5 weeks	
27 February	Beth Hart	"L.A. Song (Out of This Town)"	1 week	
5 March	Christina Aguilera	"What a Girl Wants"	5 weeks	
12 March	Christina Aguilera	"What a Girl Wants"	5 weeks	
19 March	Christina Aguilera	"What a Girl Wants"	5 weeks	
26 March	S Club 7	"Two in a Million"	1 week	
2 April	Madison Avenue	"Don't Call Me Baby"	1 week	
9 April	*NSYNC	"Bye Bye Bye"	1 week	
16 April	Vengaboys	"Shalala Lala"	3 weeks	
23 April	Vengaboys	"Shalala Lala"	3 weeks	
30 April	Vengaboys	"Shalala Lala"	3 weeks	
7 May	Bardot	"Poison"	3 weeks	
14 May	Bardot	"Poison"	3 weeks	
21 May	Bardot	"Poison"	3 weeks	
28 May	Sisqó	"Thong Song"	1 week	
4 June	Britney Spears	"Oops!... I Did It Again"	1 week	
11 June	Melanie C featuring Lisa "Left Eye" Lopes	"Never Be the Same Again"	3 weeks	
18 June	Melanie C featuring Lisa "Left Eye" Lopes	"Never Be the Same Again"	3 weeks	
25 June	Melanie C featuring Lisa "Left Eye" Lopes	"Never Be the Same Again"	3 weeks	
2 July	Anastacia	"I'm Outta Love"	7 weeks	
9 July	Anastacia	"I'm Outta Love"	7 weeks	
16 July	Anastacia	"I'm Outta Love"	7 weeks	
23 July	Anastacia	"I'm Outta Love"	7 weeks	
30 July	Anastacia	"I'm Outta Love"	7 weeks	
6 August	Anastacia	"I'm Outta Love"	7 weeks	
13 August	Anastacia	"I'm Outta Love"	7 weeks	
20 August	Robbie Williams	"Rock DJ"	4 weeks	
27 August	Robbie Williams	"Rock DJ"	4 weeks	
3 September	Robbie Williams	"Rock DJ"	4 weeks	
10 September	Bomfunk MC's	"Freestyler"	2 weeks	
17 September	Robbie Williams	"Rock DJ"	4 weeks	
24 September	Bomfunk MC's	"Freestyler"	2 weeks	
1 October	Madonna	"Music"	1 week	
8 October	Spiller featuring Sophie Ellis-Bextor	"Groovejet (If This Ain't Love)"	7 weeks	
15 October	Spiller featuring Sophie Ellis-Bextor	"Groovejet (If This Ain't Love)"	7 weeks	
22 October	Spiller featuring Sophie Ellis-Bextor	"Groovejet (If This Ain't Love)"	7 weeks	
29 October	Spiller featuring Sophie Ellis-Bextor	"Groovejet (If This Ain't Love)"	7 weeks	
5 November	Spiller featuring Sophie Ellis-Bextor	"Groovejet (If This Ain't Love)"	7 weeks	
12 November	Spiller featuring Sophie Ellis-Bextor	"Groovejet (If This Ain't Love)"	7 weeks	
19 November	Spiller featuring Sophie Ellis-Bextor	"Groovejet (If This Ain't Love)"	7 weeks	
26 November	Baha Men	"Who Let the Dogs Out?"	2 weeks	
3 December	Baha Men	"Who Let the Dogs Out?"	2 weeks	
10 December	Samantha Mumba	"Gotta Tell You"	1 week	
17 December	Destiny's Child	"Independent Women Part I"	1 week	
24 December	Fur Patrol	"Lydia"	3 weeks	
31 December	Fur Patrol	"Lydia"	3 weeks	

== 2001 ==
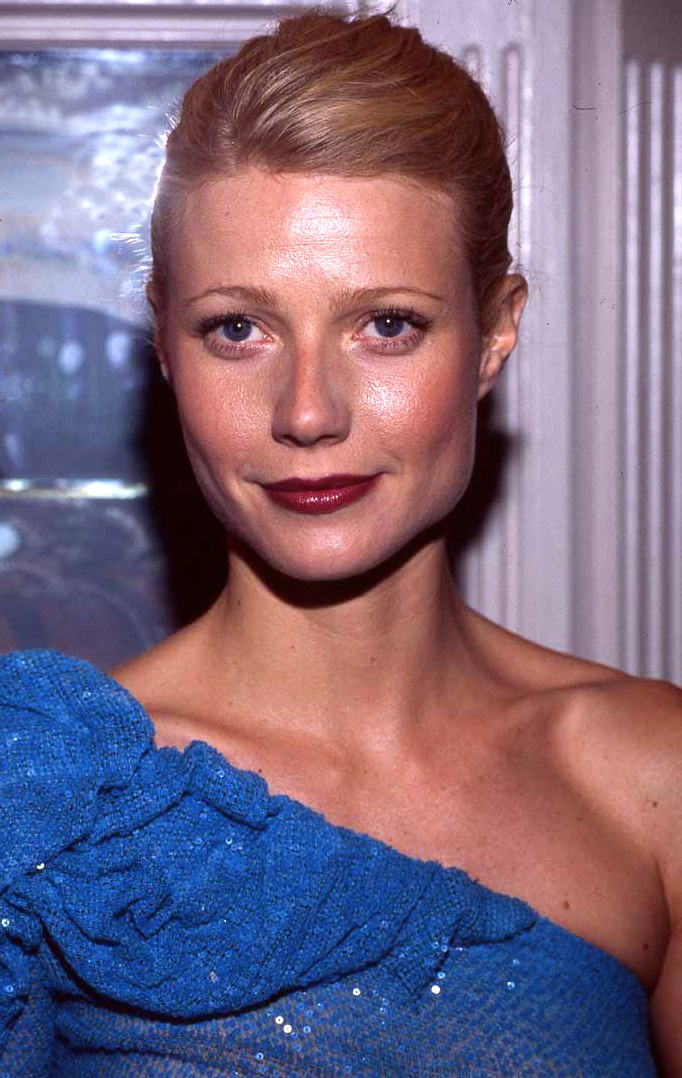
American actress Gwyneth Paltrow spent five weeks at number one with "Cruisin'", a duet with Huey Lewis.

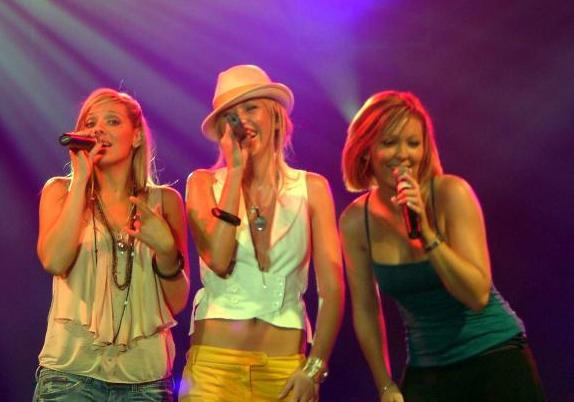
Atomic Kitten scored three number ones in the 2000s: "Whole Again", "Eternal Flame" and "The Tide Is High".

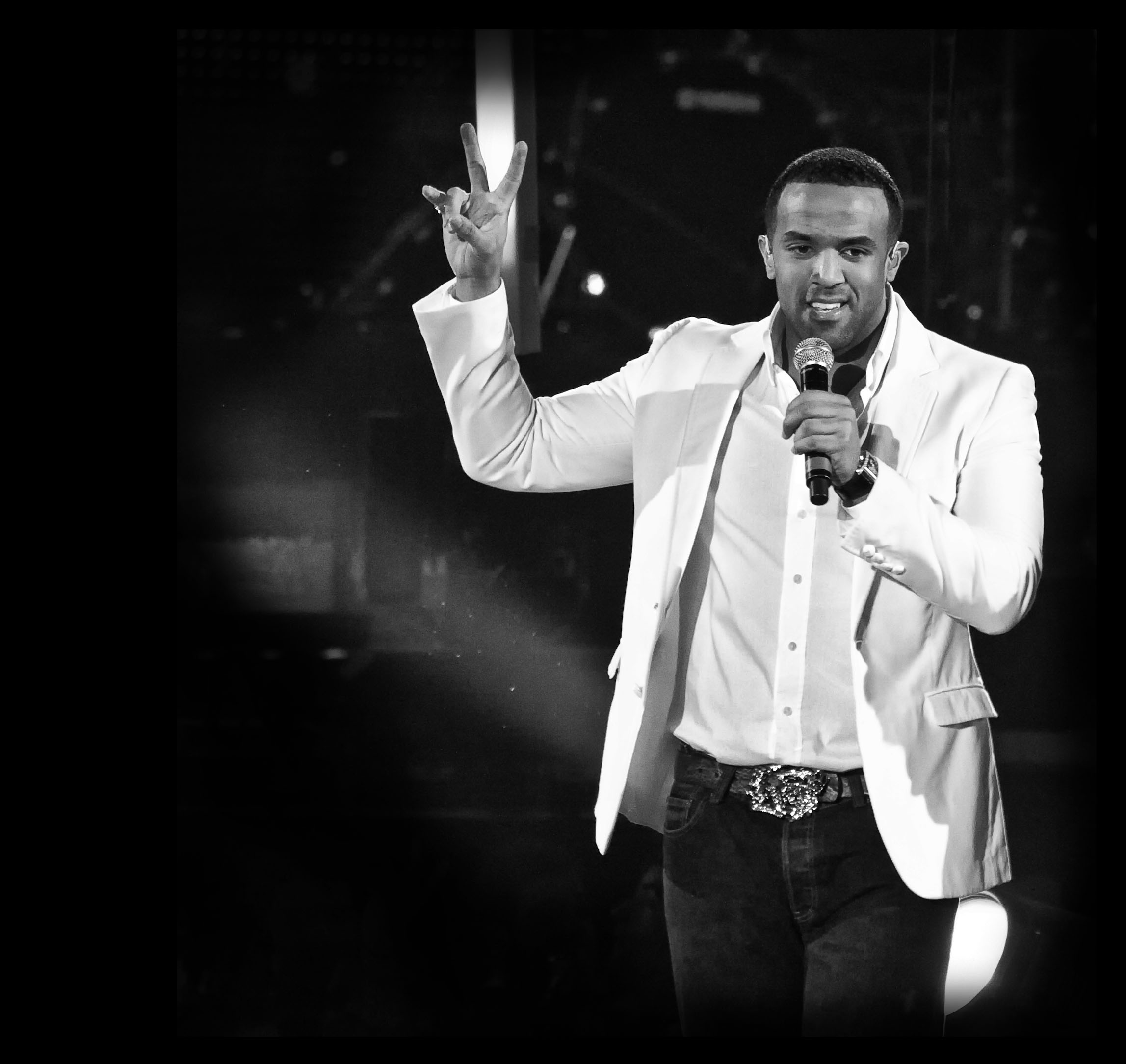
Craig David's "Walking Away" was the number-one single of 2001, despite only topping the chart for two weeks.

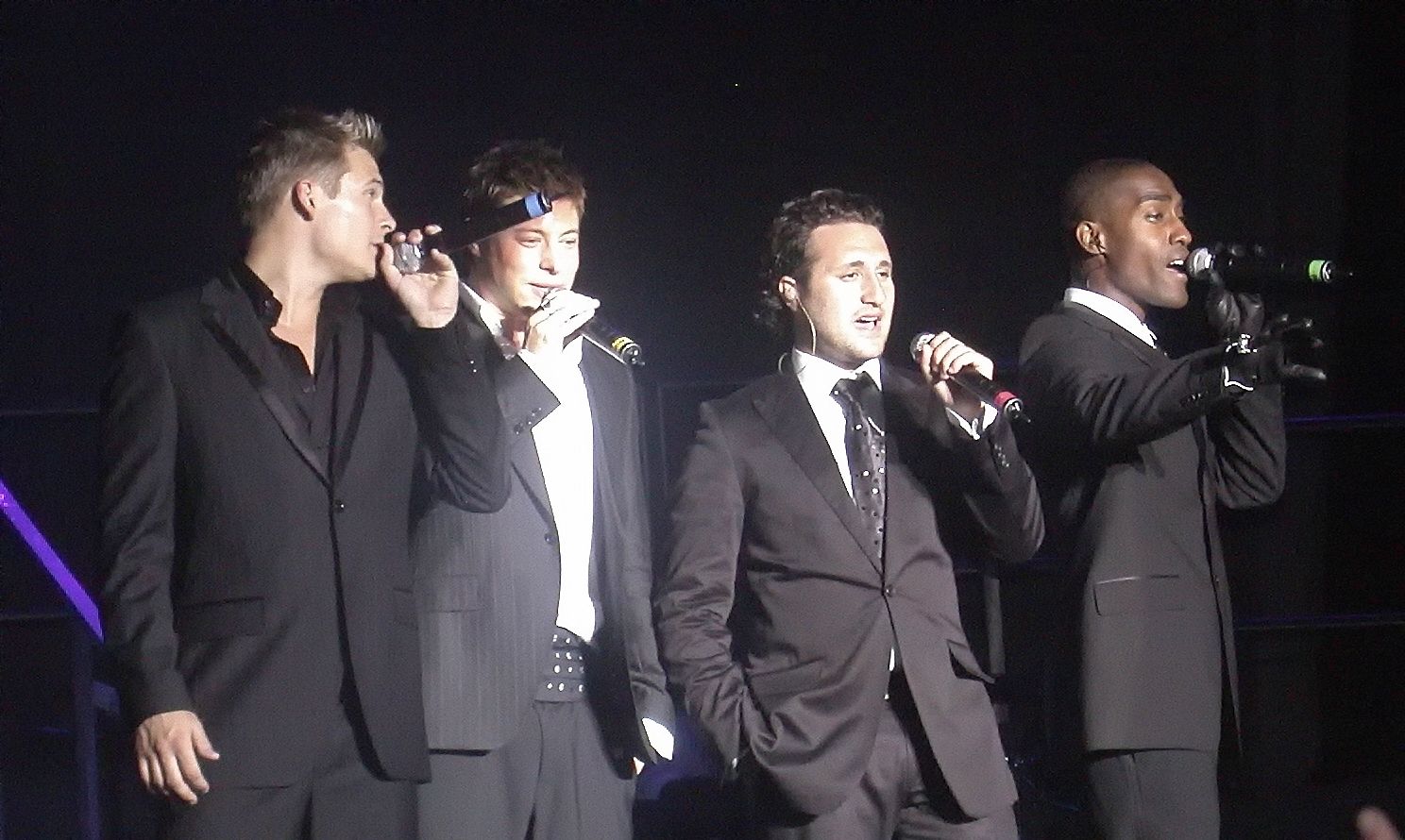
Two singles by Blue went to number one: "All Rise" and "Too Close".

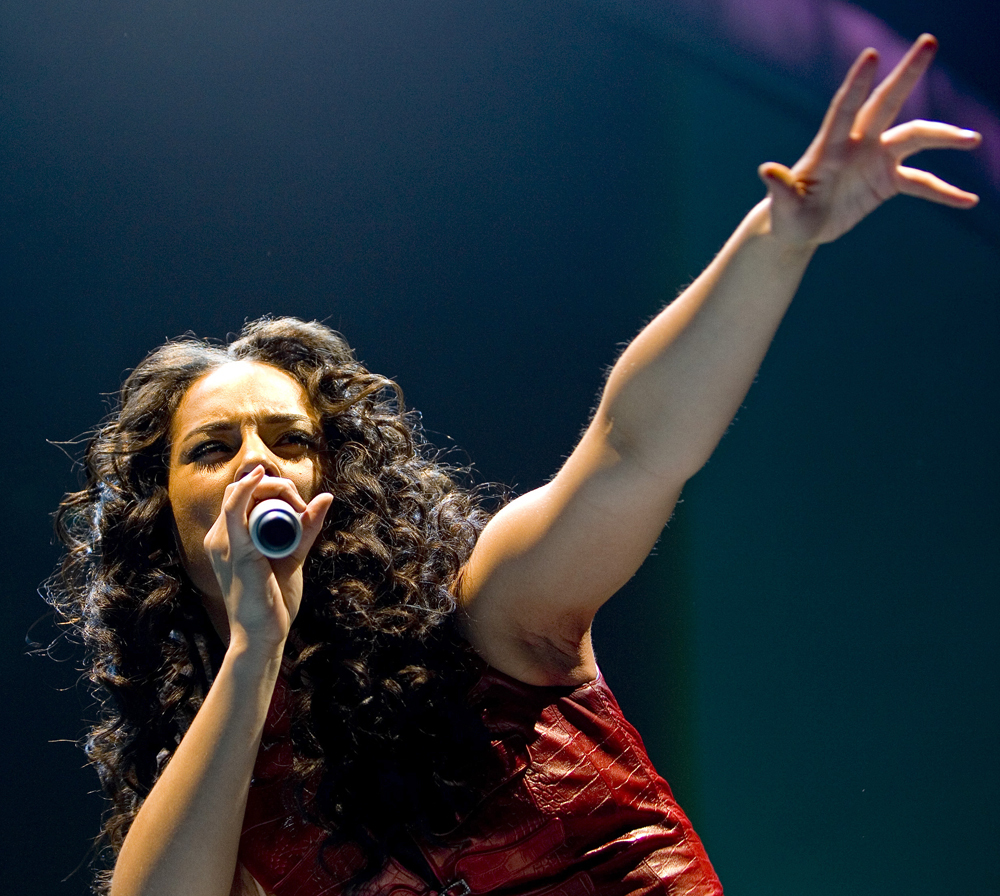
Alicia Keys' debut single, "Fallin'", was number one for three weeks.

Date	Artist	Single	Weeks at number one	Ref.
7 January	Fur Patrol	"Lydia"	3 weeks	
14 January	Backstreet Boys	"Shape of My Heart"	1 week	
21 January	Gwyneth Paltrow and Huey Lewis	"Cruisin'"	5 weeks	
28 January	Gwyneth Paltrow and Huey Lewis	"Cruisin'"	5 weeks	
4 February	Gwyneth Paltrow and Huey Lewis	"Cruisin'"	5 weeks	
11 February	Gwyneth Paltrow and Huey Lewis	"Cruisin'"	5 weeks	
18 February	Gwyneth Paltrow and Huey Lewis	"Cruisin'"	5 weeks	
25 February	Madonna	"Don't Tell Me"	1 week	
4 March	Jennifer Lopez	"Love Don't Cost a Thing"	2 weeks	
11 March	Jennifer Lopez	"Love Don't Cost a Thing"	2 weeks	
18 March	Ricky Martin with Christina Aguilera	"Nobody Wants to Be Lonely"	2 weeks	
25 March	LeAnn Rimes	"Can't Fight the Moonlight"	2 weeks	
1 April	Ricky Martin with Christina Aguilera	"Nobody Wants to Be Lonely"	2 weeks	
8 April	LeAnn Rimes	"Can't Fight the Moonlight"	2 weeks	
15 April	Atomic Kitten	"Whole Again"	6 weeks	
22 April	Atomic Kitten	"Whole Again"	6 weeks	
29 April	Atomic Kitten	"Whole Again"	6 weeks	
6 May	Atomic Kitten	"Whole Again"	6 weeks	
13 May	Atomic Kitten	"Whole Again"	6 weeks	
20 May	Atomic Kitten	"Whole Again"	6 weeks	
27 May	Craig David	"Walking Away"	2 weeks	
3 June	Craig David	"Walking Away"	2 weeks	
10 June	Christina Aguilera, Mýa, Lil' Kim and P!nk	"Lady Marmalade"	3 weeks	
17 June	Christina Aguilera, Mýa, Lil' Kim and P!nk	"Lady Marmalade"	3 weeks	
24 June	Christina Aguilera, Mýa, Lil' Kim and P!nk	"Lady Marmalade"	3 weeks	
1 July	Emma Bunton	"What Took You So Long?"	1 week	
8 July	Uncle Kracker	"Follow Me"	1 week	
15 July	Hear'Say	"Pure and Simple"	5 weeks	
22 July	Hear'Say	"Pure and Simple"	5 weeks	
29 July	Hear'Say	"Pure and Simple"	5 weeks	
5 August	Hear'Say	"Pure and Simple"	5 weeks	
12 August	Hear'Say	"Pure and Simple"	5 weeks	
19 August	Blue	"All Rise"	2 weeks	
26 August	Nelly Furtado	"Turn Off the Light"	2 weeks	
2 September	Nelly Furtado	"Turn Off the Light"	2 weeks	
9 September	Blue	"All Rise"	2 weeks	
16 September	Gorillaz	"19-2000"	1 week	
23 September	Atomic Kitten	"Eternal Flame"	1 week	
30 September	Robbie Williams	"Eternity"	1 week	
7 October	Afroman	"Because I Got High"	3 weeks	
14 October	Afroman	"Because I Got High"	3 weeks	
21 October	Afroman	"Because I Got High"	3 weeks	
28 October	Kylie Minogue	"Can't Get You Out of My Head"	3 weeks	
4 November	Kylie Minogue	"Can't Get You Out of My Head"	3 weeks	
11 November	Kylie Minogue	"Can't Get You Out of My Head"	3 weeks	
18 November	Alicia Keys	"Fallin'"	3 weeks	
25 November	Blue	"Too Close"	2 weeks	
2 December	Blue	"Too Close"	2 weeks	
9 December	Alicia Keys	"Fallin'"	3 weeks	
16 December	Alicia Keys	"Fallin'"	3 weeks	
23 December	Robbie Williams and Nicole Kidman	"Somethin' Stupid"	4 weeks	
30 December	Robbie Williams and Nicole Kidman	"Somethin' Stupid"	4 weeks	

== 2002 ==
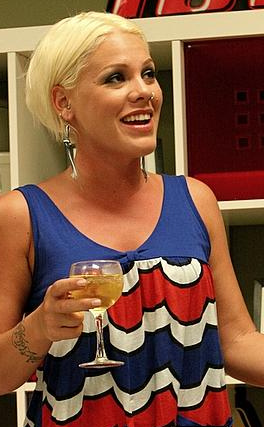
Pink earned her first solo number-ones in 2002, when "Get the Party Started" and "Don't Let Me Get Me" both reached the summit. "So What" also reached number one in 2008.

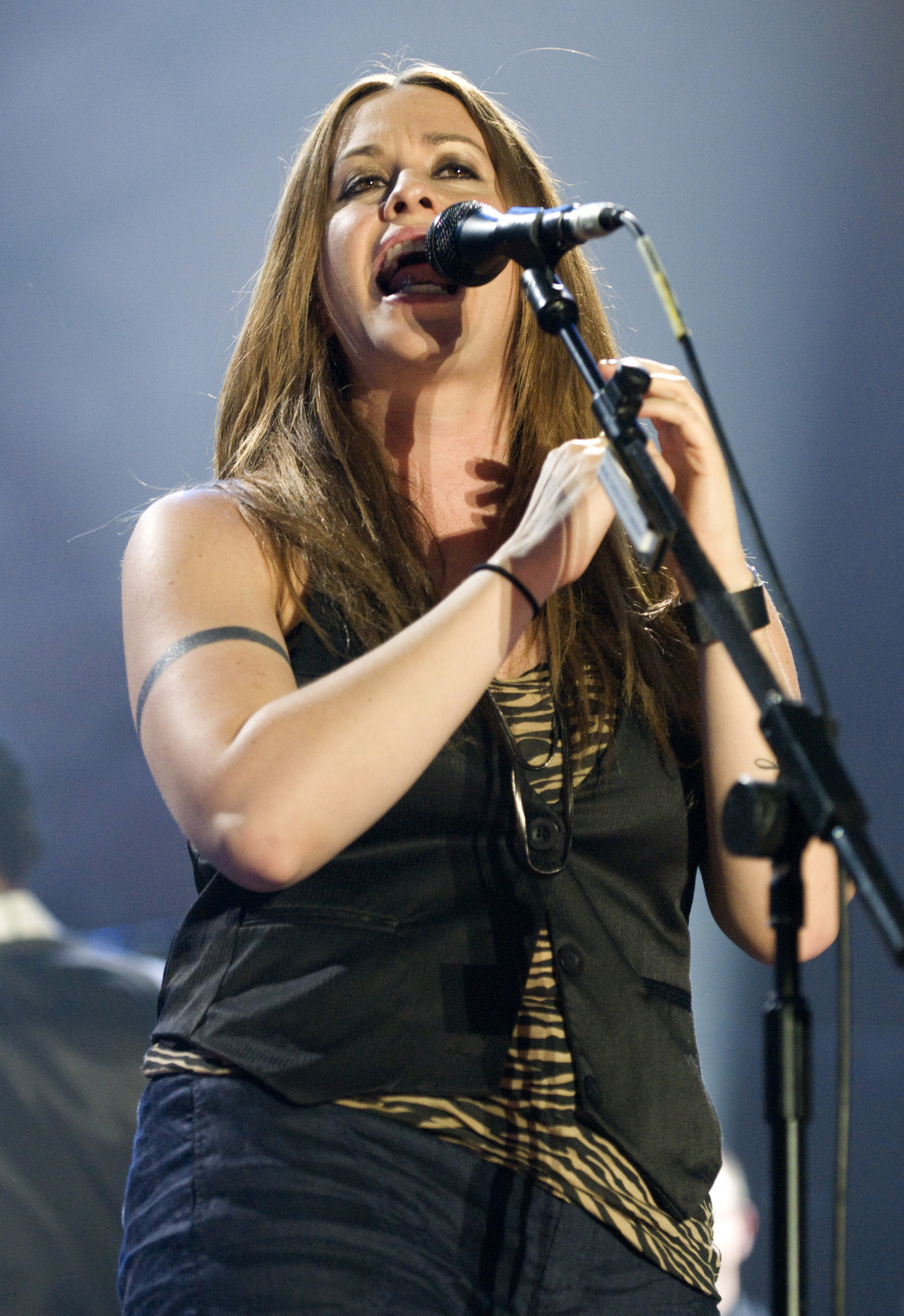
Alanis Morissette's "Hands Clean" went to number one in 2002.

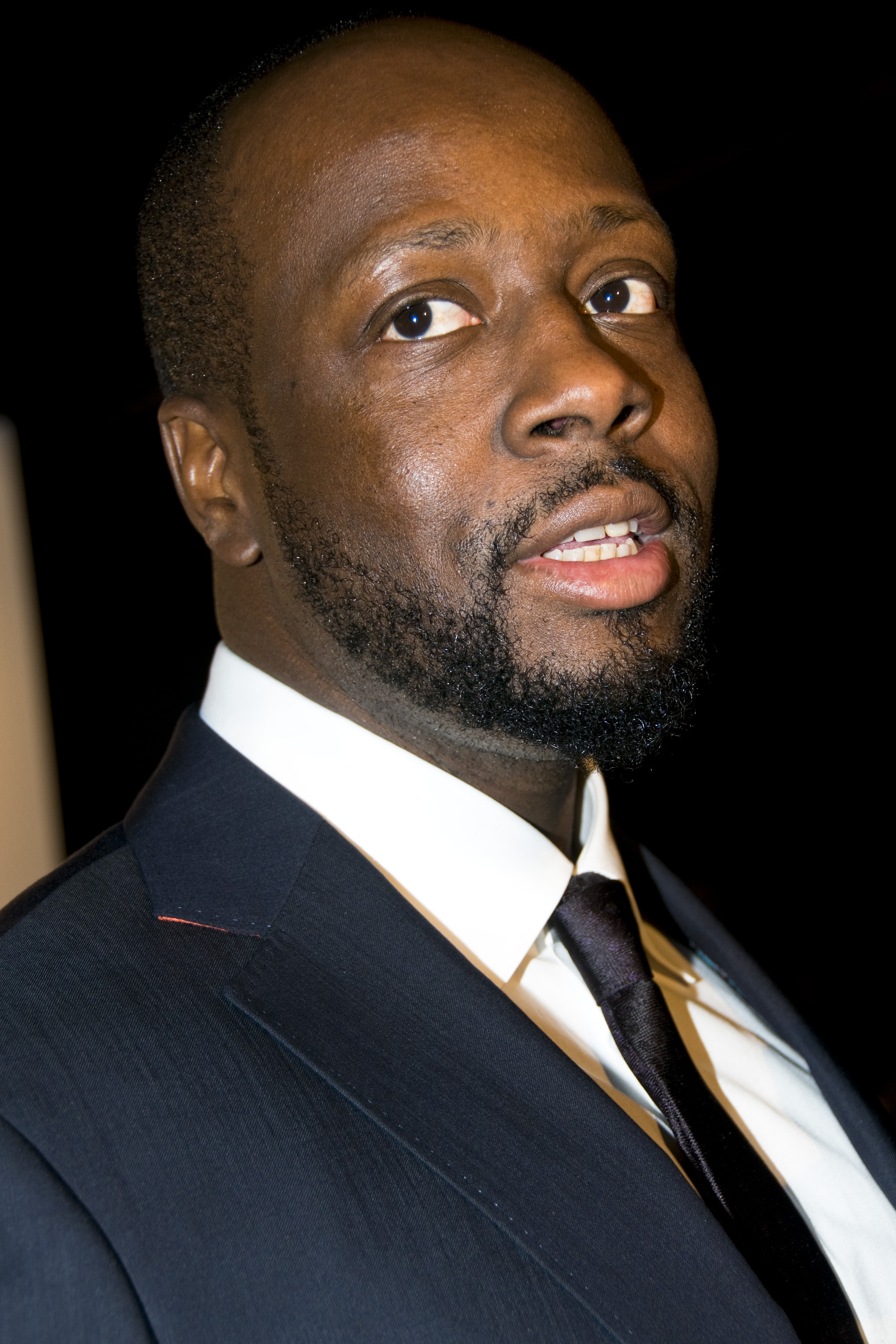
Wyclef Jean's "Two Wrongs", which features Claudette Ortiz, spent one week in the top spot.

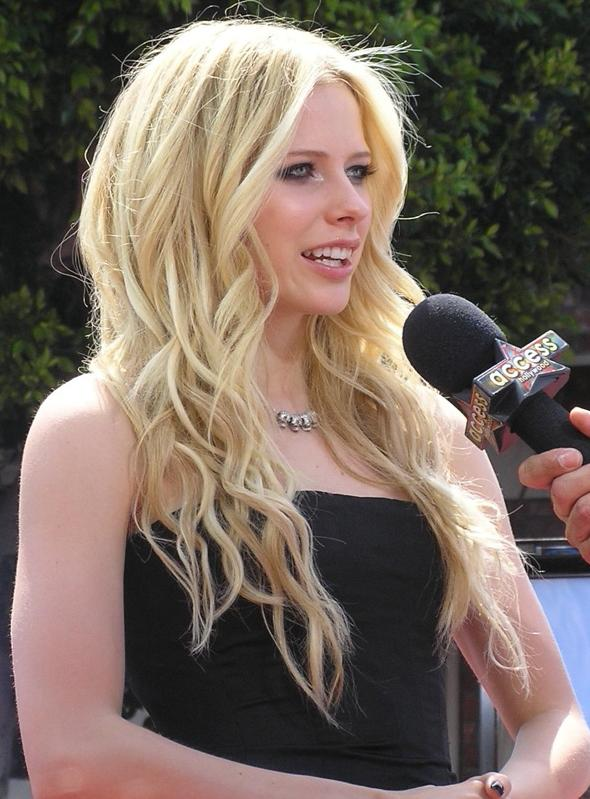
Avril Lavigne's "Complicated" spent nine weeks at number one, which helped it secure its place at the top of the 2002 annual singles chart. In 2007, "Girlfriend" topped the chart for a week.

Date	Artist	Single	Weeks at number one	Ref.
6 January	Robbie Williams and Nicole Kidman	"Somethin' Stupid"	4 weeks	
13 January	Robbie Williams and Nicole Kidman	"Somethin' Stupid"	4 weeks	
20 January	P!nk	"Get the Party Started"	3 weeks	
27 January	P!nk	"Get the Party Started"	3 weeks	
3 February	P!nk	"Get the Party Started"	3 weeks	
10 February	Shakira	"Whenever, Wherever"	8 weeks	
17 February	Shakira	"Whenever, Wherever"	8 weeks	
24 February	Shakira	"Whenever, Wherever"	8 weeks	
3 March	Shakira	"Whenever, Wherever"	8 weeks	
10 March	Alex Lloyd	"Amazing"	1 week	
17 March	Shakira	"Whenever, Wherever"	8 weeks	
24 March	Shakira	"Whenever, Wherever"	8 weeks	
31 March	Shakira	"Whenever, Wherever"	8 weeks	
7 April	Shakira	"Whenever, Wherever"	8 weeks	
14 April	Alanis Morissette	"Hands Clean"	1 week	
21 April	Darren Hayes	"Insatiable"	1 week	
28 April	The Calling	"Wherever You Will Go"	1 week	
5 May	P!nk	"Don't Let Me Get Me"	2 weeks	
12 May	Goodshirt	"Sophie"	1 week	
19 May	P!nk	"Don't Let Me Get Me"	2 weeks	
26 May	Wolverines	"65 Roses"	1 week	
2 June	Eminem	"Without Me"	7 weeks	
9 June	Eminem	"Without Me"	7 weeks	
16 June	Eminem	"Without Me"	7 weeks	
23 June	Eminem	"Without Me"	7 weeks	
30 June	Eminem	"Without Me"	7 weeks	
7 July	Eminem	"Without Me"	7 weeks	
14 July	Eminem	"Without Me"	7 weeks	
21 July	Elvis vs. JXL	"A Little Less Conversation"	3 weeks	
28 July	Elvis vs. JXL	"A Little Less Conversation"	3 weeks	
4 August	Elvis vs. JXL	"A Little Less Conversation"	3 weeks	
11 August	Wyclef Jean featuring Claudette Ortiz	"Two Wrongs"	1 week	
18 August	Avril Lavigne	"Complicated"	9 weeks	
25 August	Avril Lavigne	"Complicated"	9 weeks	
1 September	Avril Lavigne	"Complicated"	9 weeks	
8 September	Avril Lavigne	"Complicated"	9 weeks	
15 September	Avril Lavigne	"Complicated"	9 weeks	
22 September	Avril Lavigne	"Complicated"	9 weeks	
29 September	Avril Lavigne	"Complicated"	9 weeks	
6 October	Avril Lavigne	"Complicated"	9 weeks	
13 October	Avril Lavigne	"Complicated"	9 weeks	
20 October	Atomic Kitten	"The Tide Is High (Get the Feeling)"	4 weeks	
27 October	Atomic Kitten	"The Tide Is High (Get the Feeling)"	4 weeks	
3 November	Atomic Kitten	"The Tide Is High (Get the Feeling)"	4 weeks	
10 November	Atomic Kitten	"The Tide Is High (Get the Feeling)"	4 weeks	
17 November	Las Ketchup	"The Ketchup Song (Aserejé)"	10 weeks	
24 November	Las Ketchup	"The Ketchup Song (Aserejé)"	10 weeks	
1 December	Las Ketchup	"The Ketchup Song (Aserejé)"	10 weeks	
8 December	Las Ketchup	"The Ketchup Song (Aserejé)"	10 weeks	
15 December	Las Ketchup	"The Ketchup Song (Aserejé)"	10 weeks	
22 December	Las Ketchup	"The Ketchup Song (Aserejé)"	10 weeks	
29 December	Las Ketchup	"The Ketchup Song (Aserejé)"	10 weeks	

== 2003 ==
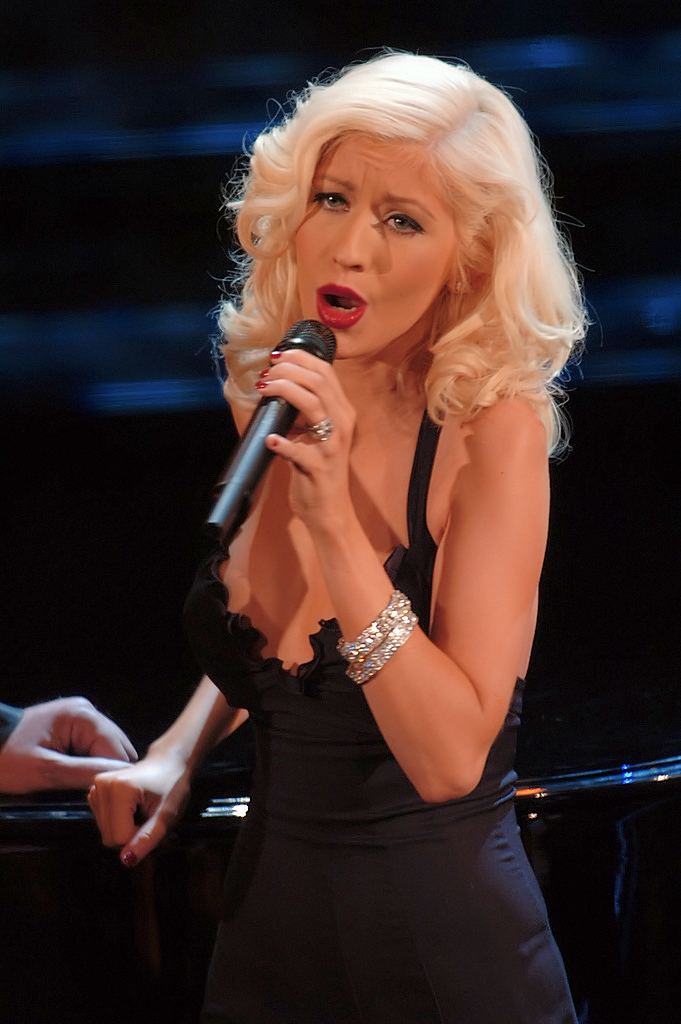
Christina Aguilera achieved four number-one singles in the 2000s: "What a Girl Wants", "Nobody Wants to Be Lonely", "Lady Marmalade" and "Beautiful".

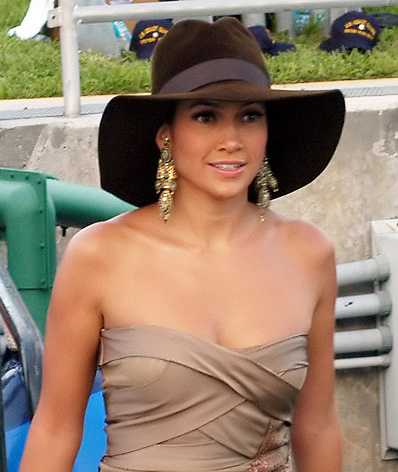
"Love Don't Cost a Thing" and "All I Have" by Jennifer Lopez both went to number one.

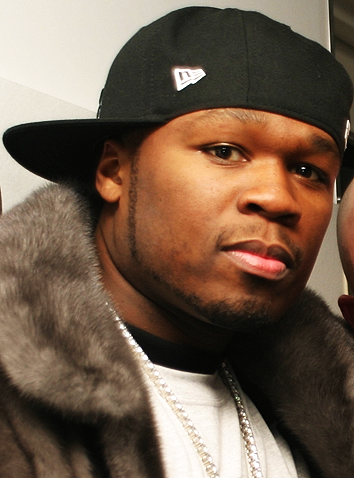
50 Cent's "In da Club" and "Ayo Technology" had runs in the top spot.

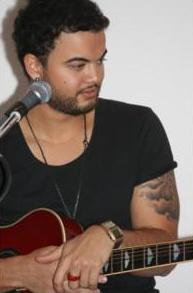
"Angels Brought Me Here" by Guy Sebastian ruled the chart for the last three weeks of 2003.

Date	Artist	Single	Weeks at number one	Ref.
5 January	Las Ketchup	"The Ketchup Song (Aserejé)"	10 weeks	
12 January	Las Ketchup	"The Ketchup Song (Aserejé)"	10 weeks	
19 January	Las Ketchup	"The Ketchup Song (Aserejé)"	10 weeks	
26 January	Eminem	"Lose Yourself"	4 weeks	
2 February	Eminem	"Lose Yourself"	4 weeks	
9 February	Eminem	"Lose Yourself"	4 weeks	
16 February	Big Brovaz	"Nu Flow"	1 week	
23 February	Eminem	"Lose Yourself"	4 weeks	
2 March	t.A.T.u.	"All the Things She Said"	3 weeks	
9 March	t.A.T.u.	"All the Things She Said"	3 weeks	
16 March	t.A.T.u.	"All the Things She Said"	3 weeks	
23 March	Christina Aguilera	"Beautiful"	1 week	
30 March	Jennifer Lopez featuring LL Cool J	"All I Have"	1 week	
6 April	50 Cent	"In da Club"	8 weeks	
13 April	Linkin Park	"Somewhere I Belong"	1 week	
20 April	50 Cent	"In da Club"	8 weeks	
27 April	50 Cent	"In da Club"	8 weeks	
4 May	50 Cent	"In da Club"	8 weeks	
11 May	50 Cent	"In da Club"	8 weeks	
18 May	Delta Goodrem	"Born to Try"	1 week	
25 May	50 Cent	"In da Club"	8 weeks	
1 June	50 Cent	"In da Club"	8 weeks	
8 June	50 Cent	"In da Club"	8 weeks	
15 June	Amanda Perez	"Angel"	2 weeks	
22 June	Amanda Perez	"Angel"	2 weeks	
29 June	Clay Aiken	"Bridge over Troubled Water"/"This Is the Night"	1 week	
6 July	R. Kelly	"Ignition (Remix)"	5 weeks	
13 July	R. Kelly	"Ignition (Remix)"	5 weeks	
20 July	R. Kelly	"Ignition (Remix)"	5 weeks	
27 July	R. Kelly	"Ignition (Remix)"	5 weeks	
3 August	R. Kelly	"Ignition (Remix)"	5 weeks	
10 August	The Black Eyed Peas featuring Justin Timberlake	"Where Is the Love?"	3 weeks	
17 August	Scribe	"Stand Up"/"Not Many"	12 weeks	
24 August	The Black Eyed Peas featuring Justin Timberlake	"Where Is the Love?"	3 weeks	
31 August	Scribe	"Stand Up"/"Not Many"	12 weeks	
7 September	Scribe	"Stand Up"/"Not Many"	12 weeks	
14 September	The Black Eyed Peas featuring Justin Timberlake	"Where Is the Love?"	3 weeks	
21 September	Scribe	"Stand Up"/"Not Many"	12 weeks	
28 September	Scribe	"Stand Up"/"Not Many"	12 weeks	
5 October	Chingy	"Right Thurr"	1 week	
12 October	Scribe	"Stand Up"/"Not Many"	12 weeks	
19 October	3 the Hard Way	"It's On (Move to This)"	1 week	
26 October	Scribe	"Stand Up"/"Not Many"	12 weeks	
2 November	Scribe	"Stand Up"/"Not Many"	12 weeks	
9 November	Scribe	"Stand Up"/"Not Many"	12 weeks	
16 November	Scribe	"Stand Up"/"Not Many"	12 weeks	
23 November	Scribe	"Stand Up"/"Not Many"	12 weeks	
30 November	Scribe	"Stand Up"/"Not Many"	12 weeks	
7 December	Guy Sebastian	"Angels Brought Me Here"	6 weeks	
14 December	Guy Sebastian	"Angels Brought Me Here"	6 weeks	
21 December	Guy Sebastian	"Angels Brought Me Here"	6 weeks	
28 December	Guy Sebastian	"Angels Brought Me Here"	6 weeks	

== 2004 ==
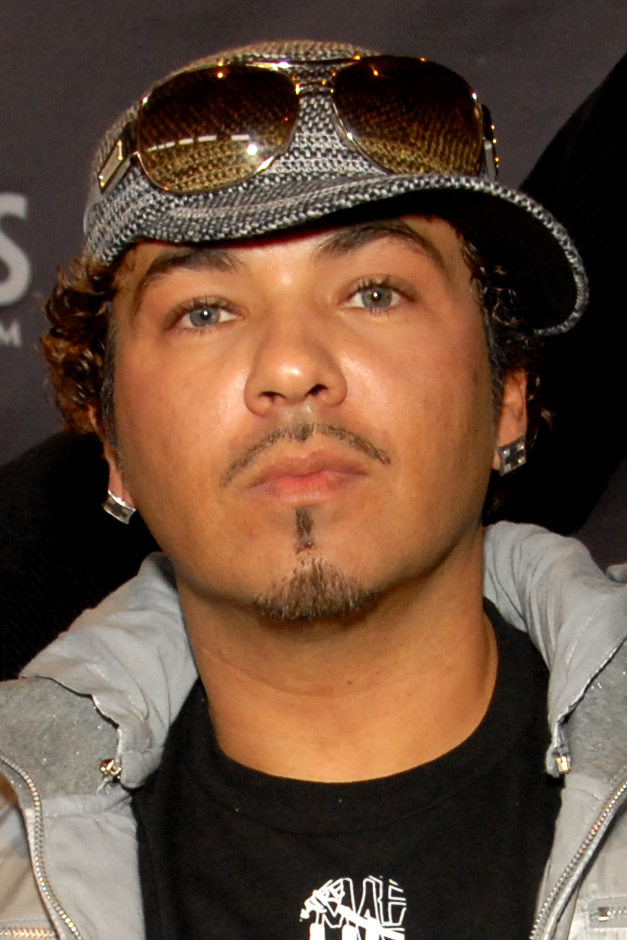
"Suga Suga", by Baby Bash, had three weeks at number one.

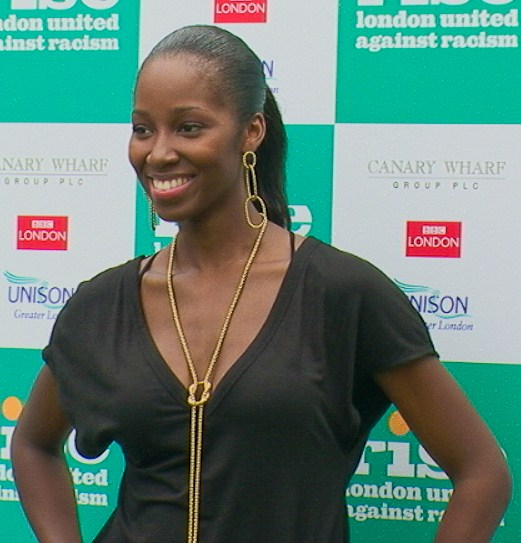
British singer Jamelia spent three non-consecutive weeks at number one in 2004 with "Superstar".

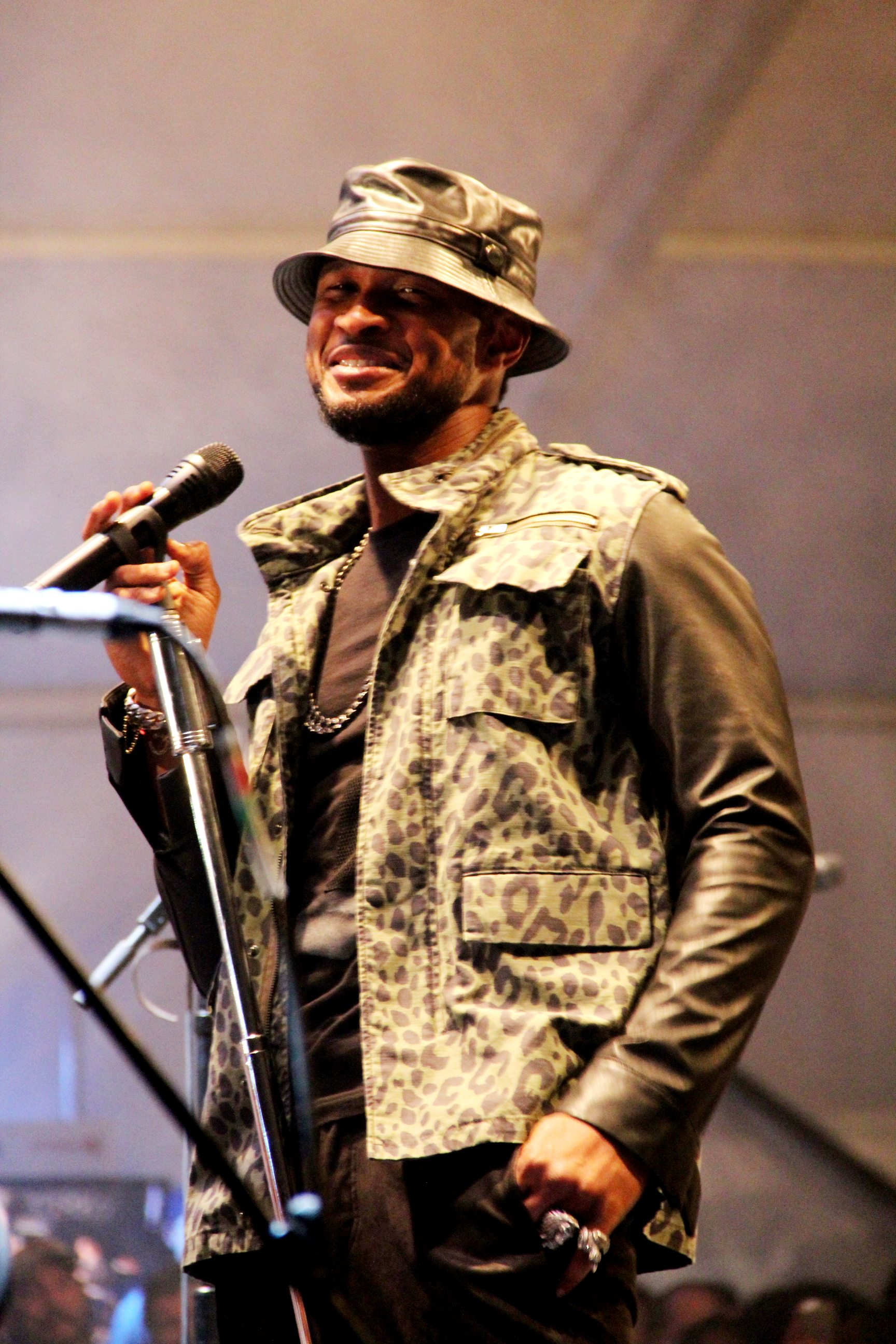
Usher achieved three number-ones this decade: "Yeah!", "Burn" and "Love in This Club".

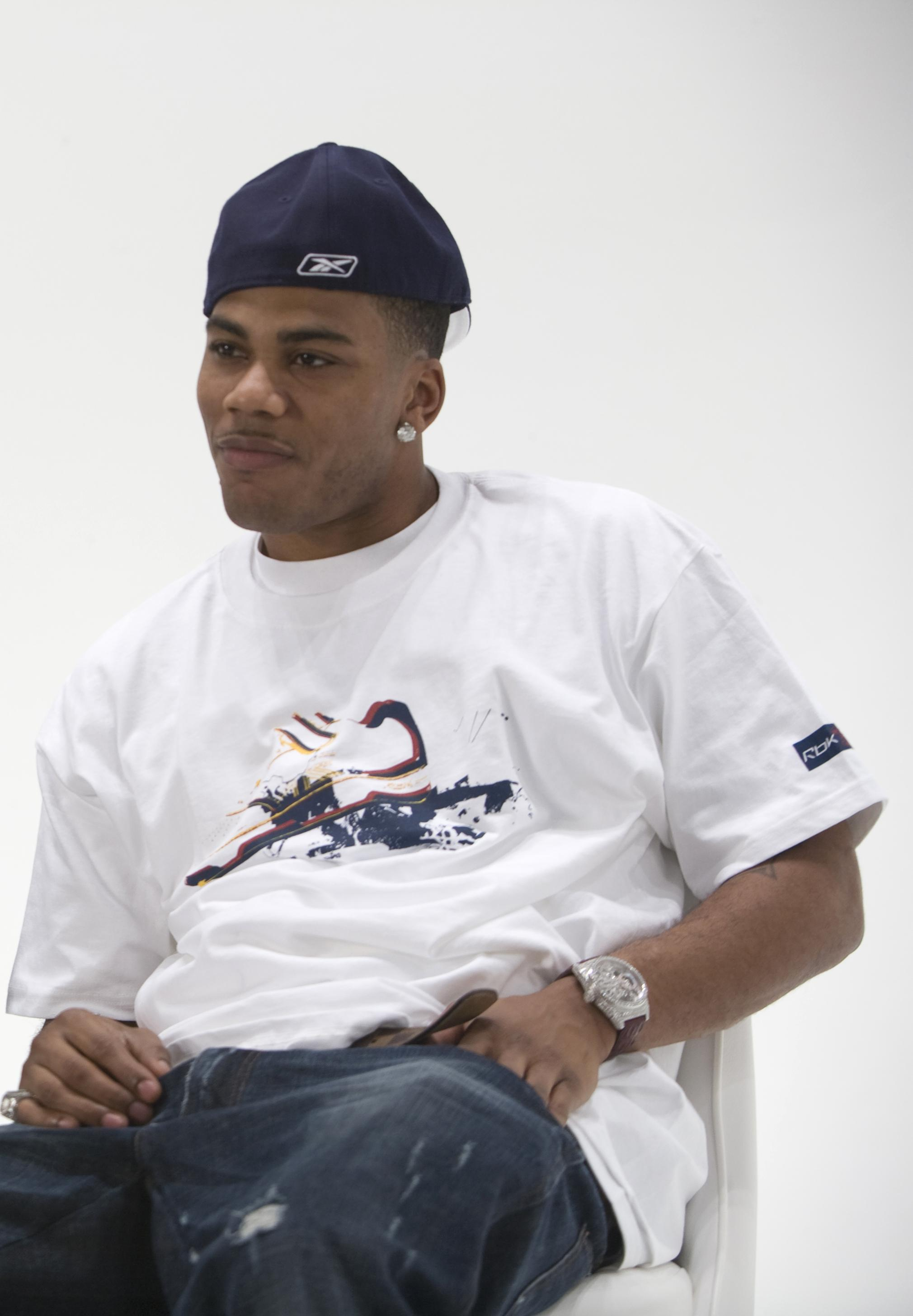
Nelly's double A-side "My Place"/"Flap Your Wings" topped the chart for a week.

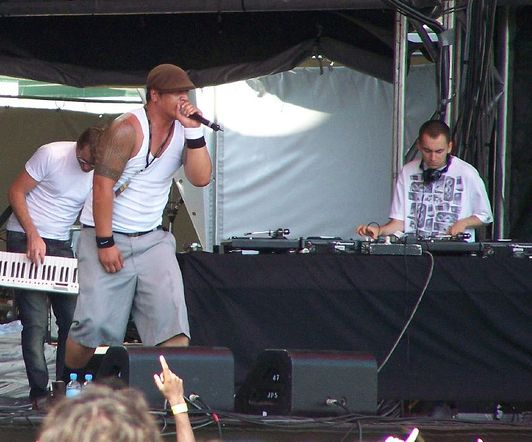
Scribe's "Stand Up"/"Not Many" had twelve weeks at number one, and became the number-one single of 2004. "Dreaming"/"So Nice" and "Stop the Music" also went to number one.

Date	Artist	Single	Weeks at number one	Ref.
4 January	Guy Sebastian	"Angels Brought Me Here"	6 weeks	
11 January	Guy Sebastian	"Angels Brought Me Here"	6 weeks	
18 January	The Black Eyed Peas	"Shut Up"	1 week	
25 January	Baby Bash featuring Frankie J	"Suga Suga"	3 weeks	
1 February	Baby Bash featuring Frankie J	"Suga Suga"	3 weeks	
8 February	Baby Bash featuring Frankie J	"Suga Suga"	3 weeks	
15 February	Jamelia	"Superstar"	3 weeks	
22 February	Scribe	"Dreaming"/"So Nice"	1 week	
29 February	Jamelia	"Superstar"	3 weeks	
7 March	Jamelia	"Superstar"	3 weeks	
14 March	Eamon	"Fuck It (I Don't Want You Back)"	5 weeks	
21 March	Eamon	"Fuck It (I Don't Want You Back)"	5 weeks	
28 March	Eamon	"Fuck It (I Don't Want You Back)"	5 weeks	
4 April	Eamon	"Fuck It (I Don't Want You Back)"	5 weeks	
11 April	Eamon	"Fuck It (I Don't Want You Back)"	5 weeks	
18 April	Usher featuring Lil Jon and Ludacris	"Yeah!"	3 weeks, 1 day	
19 April (Note: In April 2004, the chart publication date shifted from Sunday to Monday. Therefore there was a one-day chart period for 18 – 19 April 2004.)	D12	"My Band"	1 week	
26 April	Usher featuring Lil Jon and Ludacris	"Yeah!"	3 weeks, 1 day	
3 May	Usher featuring Lil Jon and Ludacris	"Yeah!"	3 weeks, 1 day	
10 May	Usher featuring Lil Jon and Ludacris	"Yeah!"	3 weeks, 1 day	
17 May	Ben Lummis	"They Can't Take That Away"	7 weeks	
24 May	Ben Lummis	"They Can't Take That Away"	7 weeks	
31 May	Ben Lummis	"They Can't Take That Away"	7 weeks	
7 June	Ben Lummis	"They Can't Take That Away"	7 weeks	
14 June	Ben Lummis	"They Can't Take That Away"	7 weeks	
21 June	Ben Lummis	"They Can't Take That Away"	7 weeks	
28 June	Ben Lummis	"They Can't Take That Away"	7 weeks	
5 July	Usher	"Burn"	3 weeks	
12 July	Usher	"Burn"	3 weeks	
19 July	Usher	"Burn"	3 weeks	
26 July	Misfits of Science	"Fools Love"	4 weeks	
2 August	Misfits of Science	"Fools Love"	4 weeks	
9 August	Misfits of Science	"Fools Love"	4 weeks	
16 August	Misfits of Science	"Fools Love"	4 weeks	
23 August	The Rasmus	"In the Shadows"	1 week	
30 August	Adeaze featuring Aaradhna	"Getting Stronger"	1 week	
6 September	Nelly	"My Place"/"Flap Your Wings"	1 week	
13 September	Michael Murphy	"So Damn Beautiful"	1 week	
20 September	Dei Hamo	"We Gon' Ride"	5 weeks	
27 September	Dei Hamo	"We Gon' Ride"	5 weeks	
4 October	Dei Hamo	"We Gon' Ride"	5 weeks	
11 October	Dei Hamo	"We Gon' Ride"	5 weeks	
18 October	Dei Hamo	"We Gon' Ride"	5 weeks	
25 October	P-Money featuring Scribe	"Stop the Music"	3 weeks	
1 November	P-Money featuring Scribe	"Stop the Music"	3 weeks	
8 November	P-Money featuring Scribe	"Stop the Music"	3 weeks	
15 November	Eminem	"Just Lose It"	5 weeks	
22 November	Eminem	"Just Lose It"	5 weeks	
29 November	Eminem	"Just Lose It"	5 weeks	
6 December	Eminem	"Just Lose It"	5 weeks	
13 December	Eminem	"Just Lose It"	5 weeks	
20 December	Band Aid 20	"Do They Know It's Christmas?"	1 week	
27 December	Snoop Dogg featuring Pharrell	"Drop It Like It's Hot"	4 weeks	

== 2005 ==
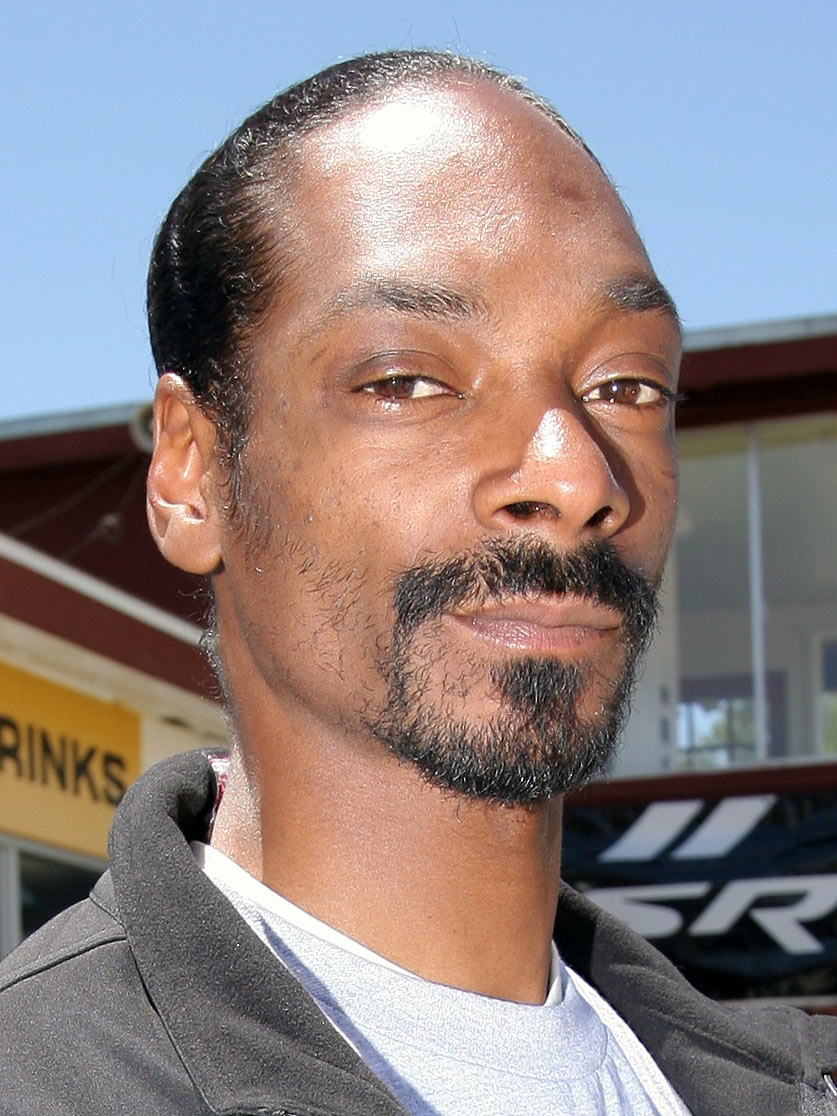
Snoop Dogg two number-ones with "Drop It Like It's Hot", featuring Pharrell, and "Buttons", with the Pussycat Dolls.

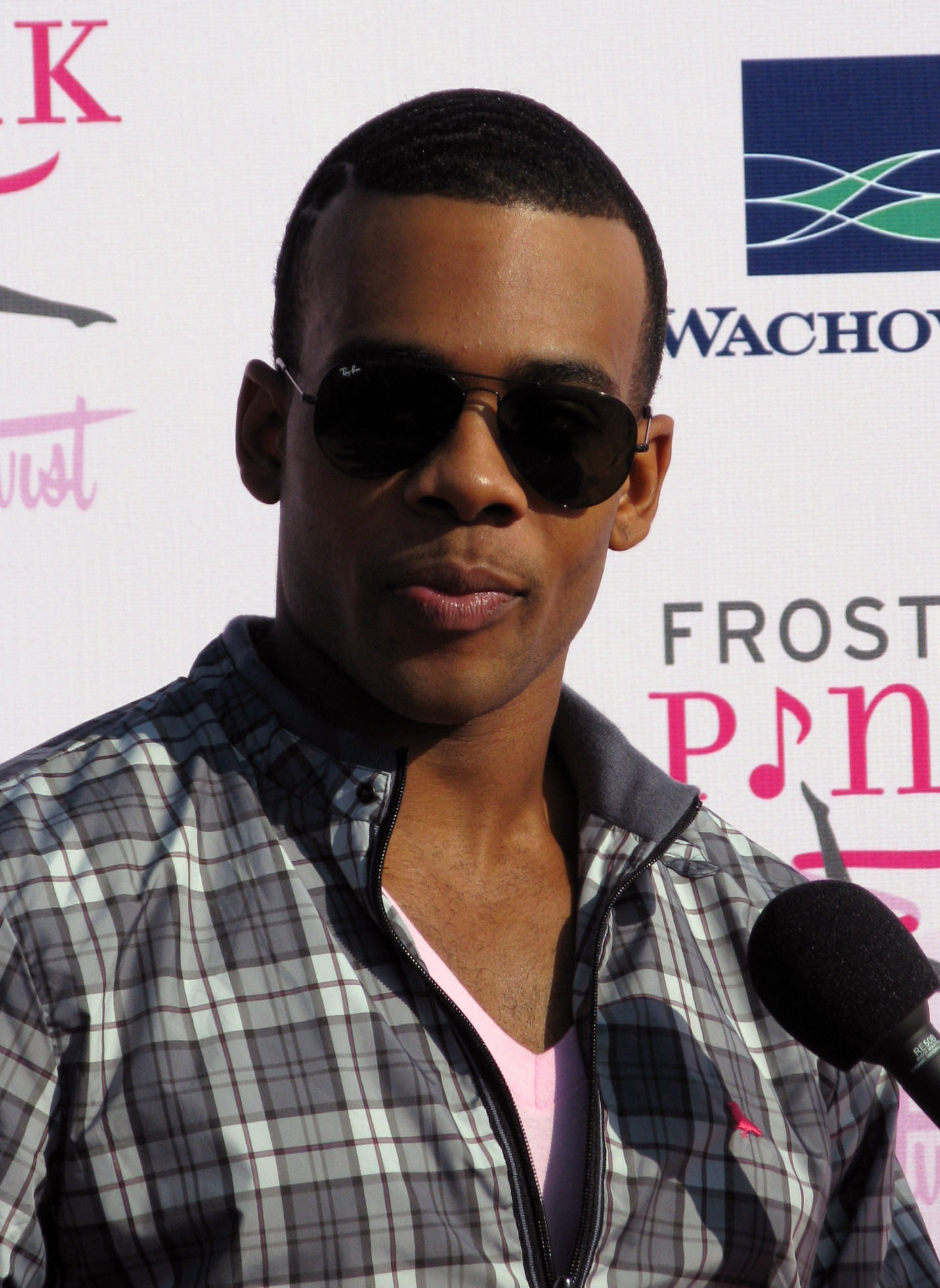
Mario's first number-one single, "Let Me Love You", held on to the top spot for five weeks.

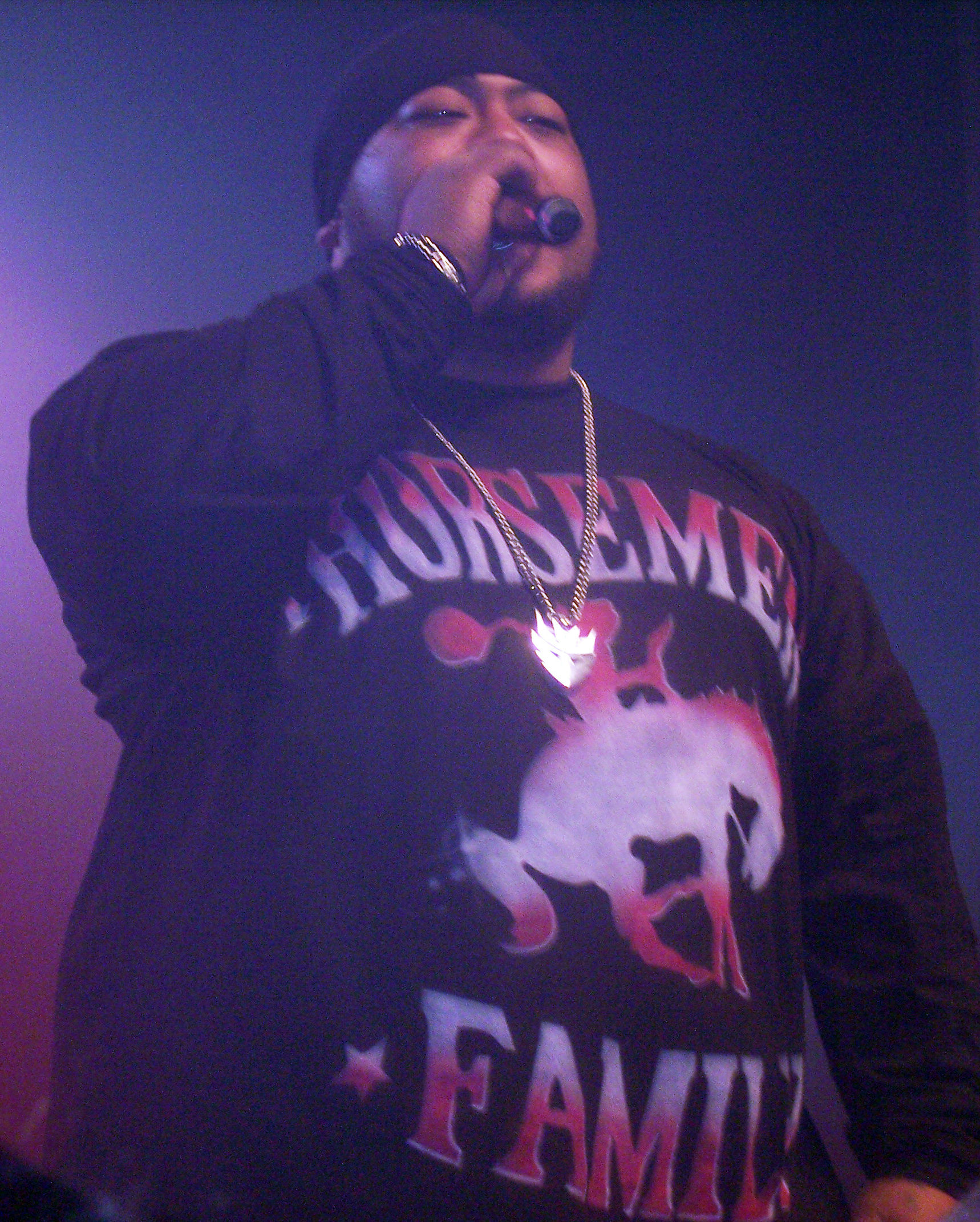
Savage had two number-one songs: "Swing" and "Moonshine".

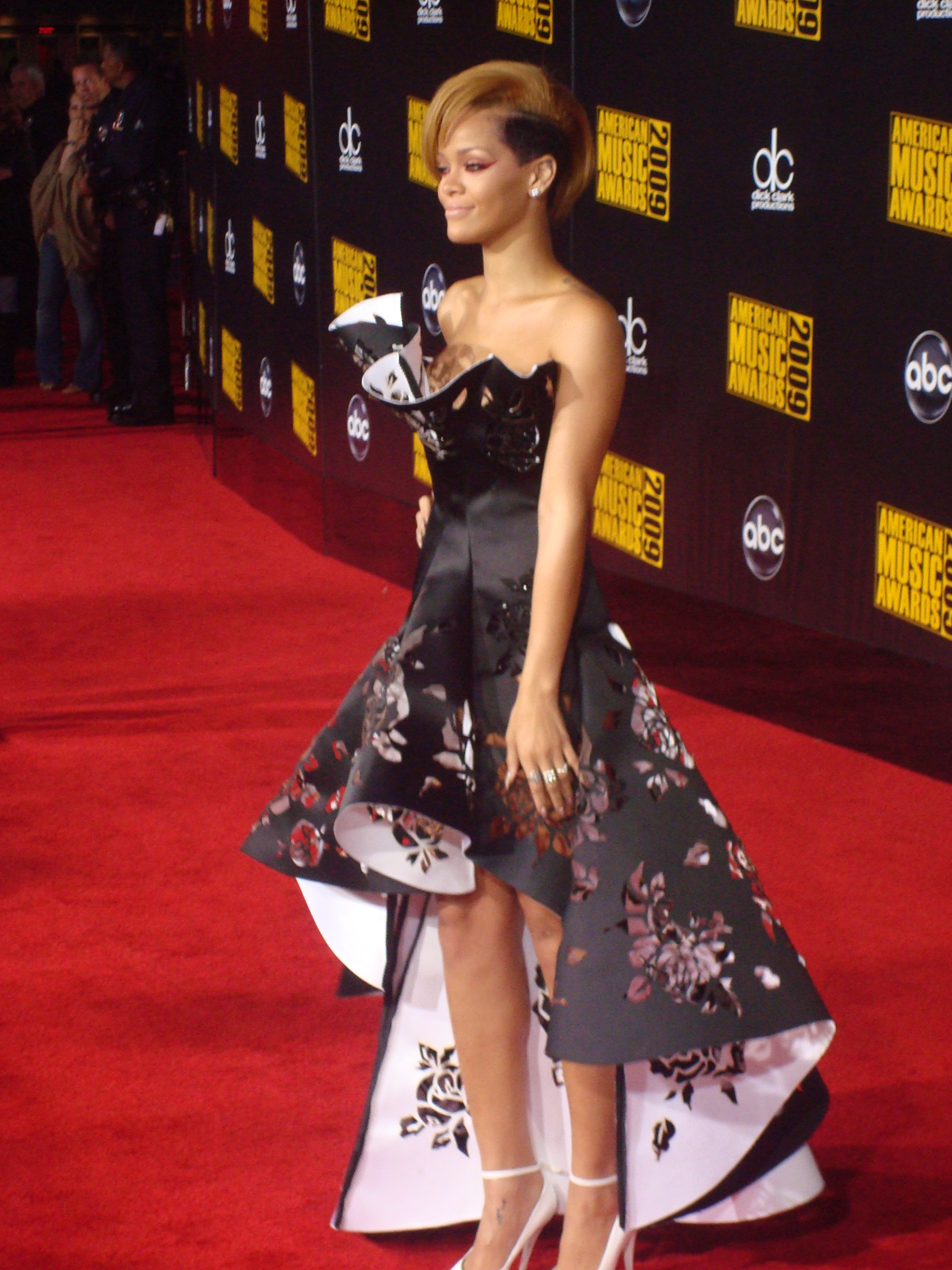
Rihanna released three number-ones: "Pon de Replay", "Umbrella" and "Disturbia". "Umbrella" became the top single of 2007.

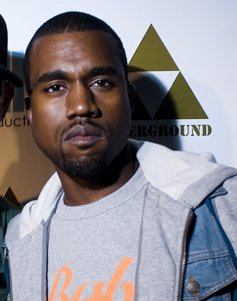
Kanye West had number-one hits with "Gold Digger", "Stronger" and "Knock You Down".

Date	Artist	Single	Weeks at number one	Ref.
3 January	Snoop Dogg featuring Pharrell	"Drop It Like It's Hot"	4 weeks	
10 January	Snoop Dogg featuring Pharrell	"Drop It Like It's Hot"	4 weeks	
17 January	Snoop Dogg featuring Pharrell	"Drop It Like It's Hot"	4 weeks	
24 January	Savage	"Swing"	5 weeks	
31 January	Savage	"Swing"	5 weeks	
7 February	Savage	"Swing"	5 weeks	
14 February	Savage	"Swing"	5 weeks	
21 February	Savage	"Swing"	5 weeks	
28 February	Mario	"Let Me Love You"	5 weeks	
7 March	Mario	"Let Me Love You"	5 weeks	
14 March	Mario	"Let Me Love You"	5 weeks	
21 March	Mario	"Let Me Love You"	5 weeks	
28 March	Mario	"Let Me Love You"	5 weeks	
4 April	Savage featuring Akon	"Moonshine"	7 weeks	
11 April	Savage featuring Akon	"Moonshine"	7 weeks	
18 April	Savage featuring Akon	"Moonshine"	7 weeks	
25 April	Savage featuring Akon	"Moonshine"	7 weeks	
2 May	Savage featuring Akon	"Moonshine"	7 weeks	
9 May	Savage featuring Akon	"Moonshine"	7 weeks	
16 May	Savage featuring Akon	"Moonshine"	7 weeks	
23 May	The Black Eyed Peas	"Don't Phunk with My Heart"	3 weeks	
30 May	The Black Eyed Peas	"Don't Phunk with My Heart"	3 weeks	
6 June	The Black Eyed Peas	"Don't Phunk with My Heart"	3 weeks	
13 June	Akon	"Lonely"	5 weeks	
20 June	Akon	"Lonely"	5 weeks	
27 June	Akon	"Lonely"	5 weeks	
4 July	Akon	"Lonely"	5 weeks	
11 July	Akon	"Lonely"	5 weeks	
18 July	Crazy Frog	"Axel F"	11 weeks	
25 July	Crazy Frog	"Axel F"	11 weeks	
1 August	Crazy Frog	"Axel F"	11 weeks	
8 August	Crazy Frog	"Axel F"	11 weeks	
15 August	Crazy Frog	"Axel F"	11 weeks	
22 August	The Pussycat Dolls featuring Busta Rhymes	"Don't Cha"	1 week	
29 August	Crazy Frog	"Axel F"	11 weeks	
5 September	Crazy Frog	"Axel F"	11 weeks	
12 September	Crazy Frog	"Axel F"	11 weeks	
19 September	Crazy Frog	"Axel F"	11 weeks	
26 September	Crazy Frog	"Axel F"	11 weeks	
3 October	Crazy Frog	"Axel F"	11 weeks	
10 October	Rihanna	"Pon de Replay"	1 week	
17 October	Crazy Frog	"Popcorn"	1 week	
24 October	Rosita Vai	"All I Ask"	2 weeks	
31 October	Rosita Vai	"All I Ask"	2 weeks	
7 November	Mattafix	"Big City Life"	1 week	
14 November	Kanye West featuring Jamie Foxx	"Gold Digger"	2 weeks	
21 November	Kanye West featuring Jamie Foxx	"Gold Digger"	2 weeks	
28 November	The Black Eyed Peas	"My Humps"	2 weeks	
5 December	Crazy Frog	"Jingle Bells/Last Christmas"	4 weeks	
12 December	Crazy Frog	"Jingle Bells/Last Christmas"	4 weeks	
19 December	Crazy Frog	"Jingle Bells/Last Christmas"	4 weeks	
26 December	Crazy Frog	"Jingle Bells/Last Christmas"	4 weeks	

== 2006 ==
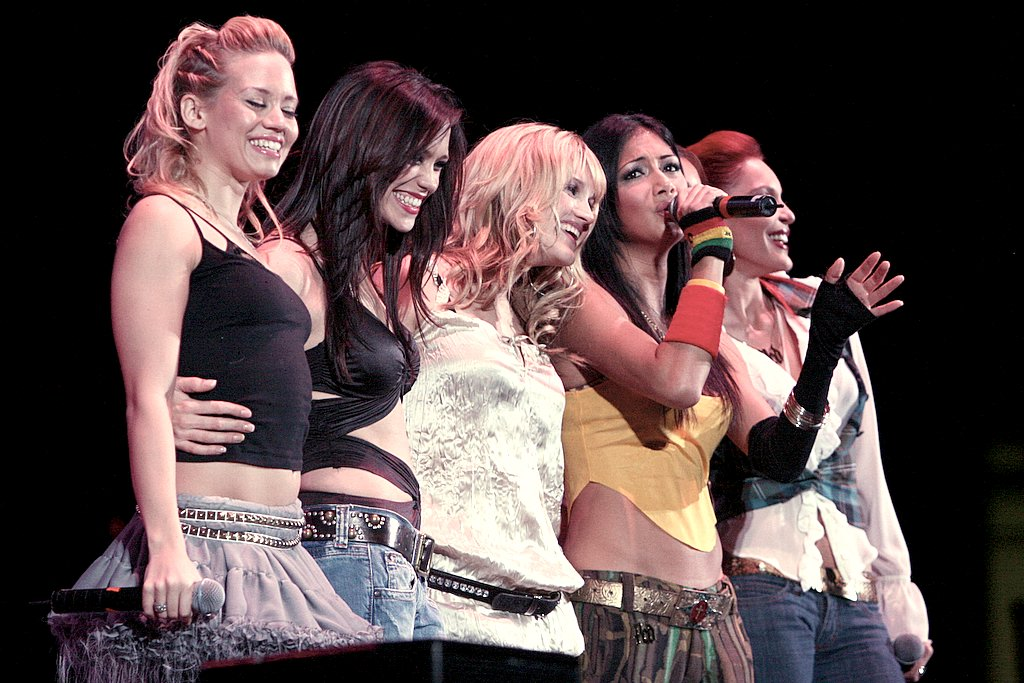
The Pussycat Dolls earned four consecutive number-one hits: "Don't Cha", "Stickwitu", "Beep", and "Buttons".

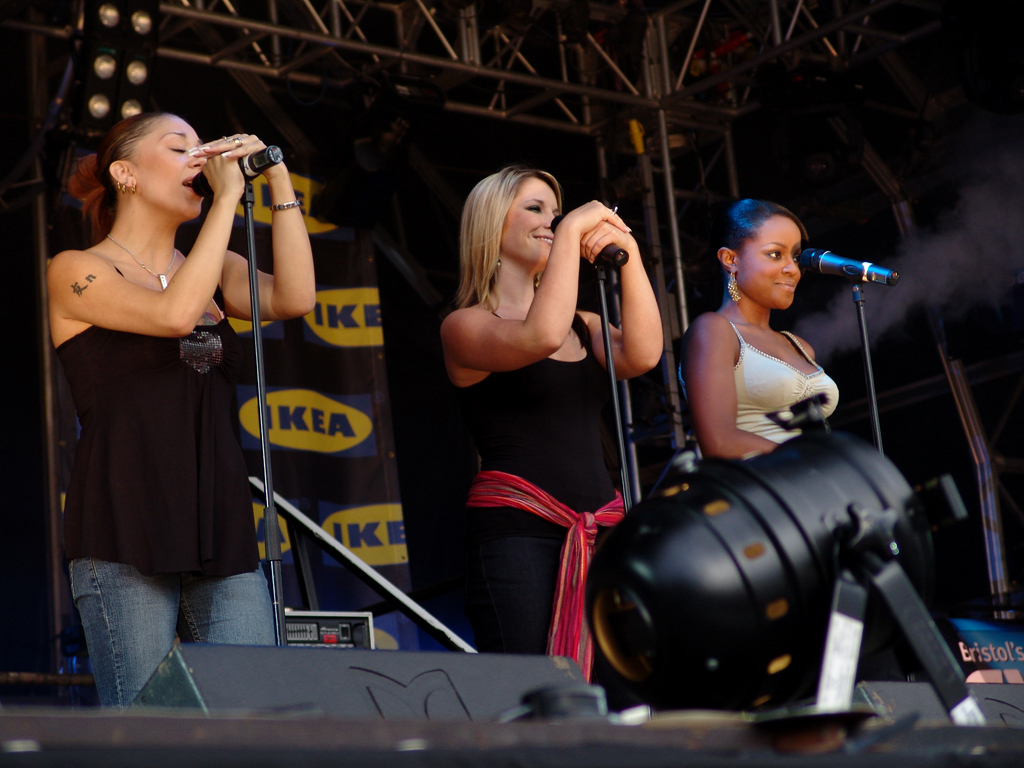
After five years of successful hits, English girl group Sugababes scored their only New Zealand number-one single in 2006, "Push the Button".

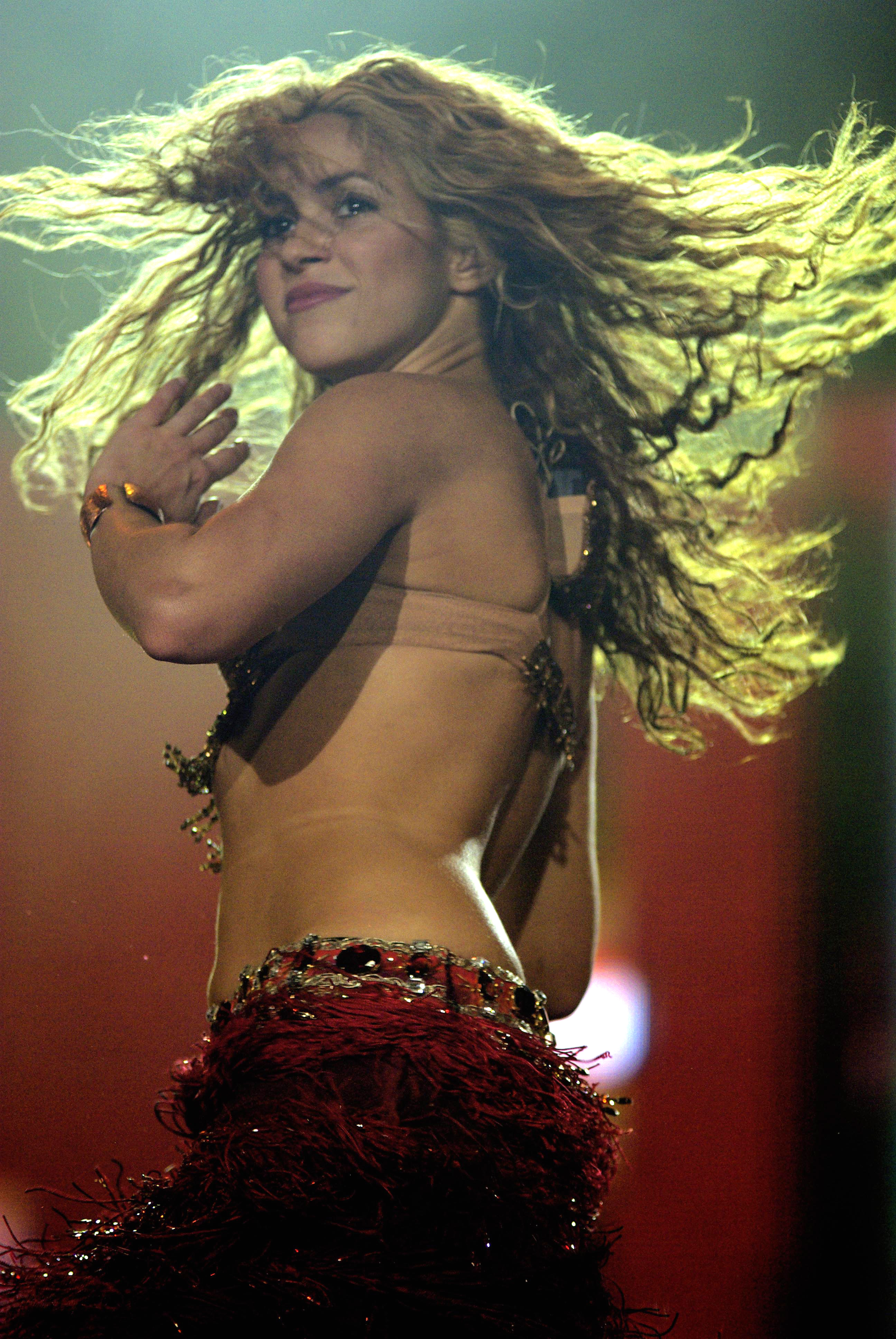
Shakira had three number-one singles in New Zealand this decade: "Whenever, Wherever", "Hips Don't Lie" and "Beautiful Liar".

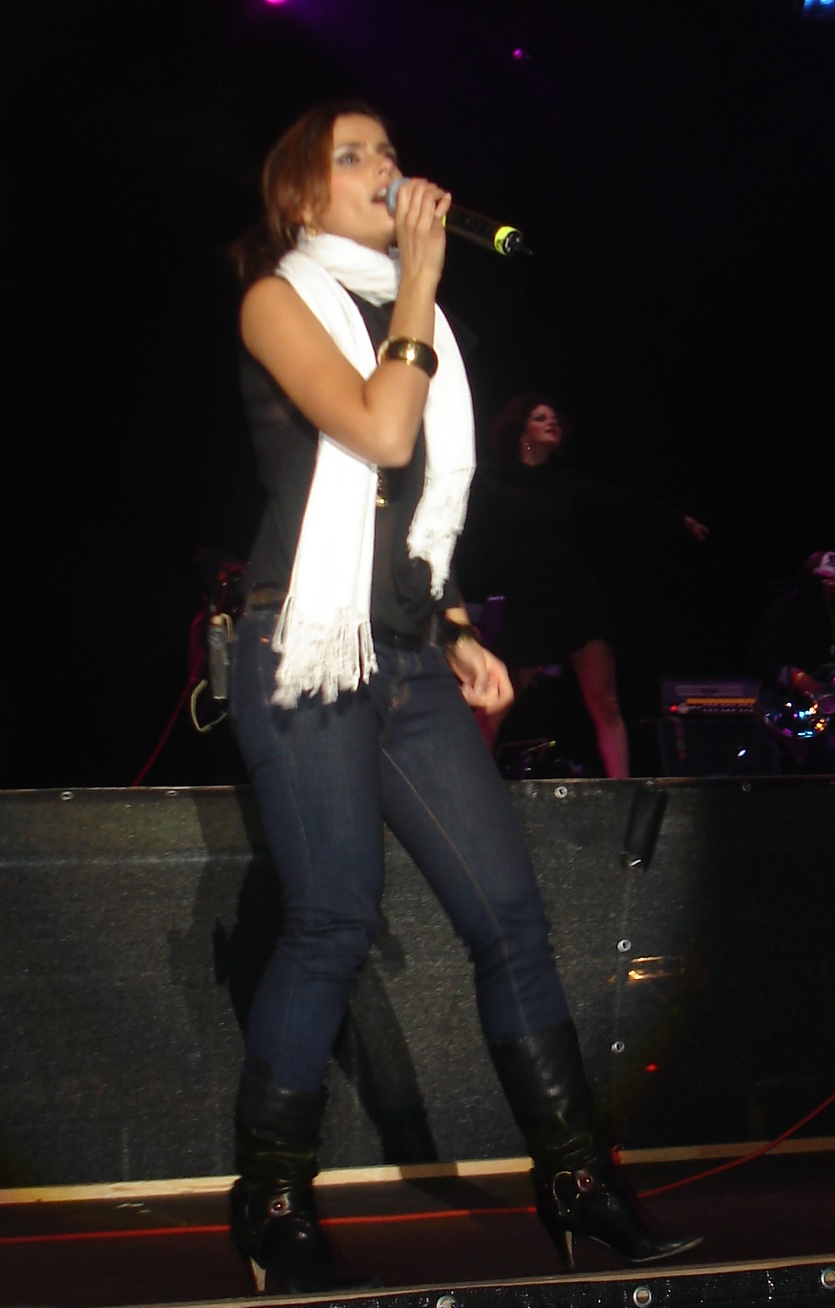
Nelly Furtado's "Turn Off the Light", "Promiscuous", featuring Timbaland, and "Say It Right" all topped the chart.

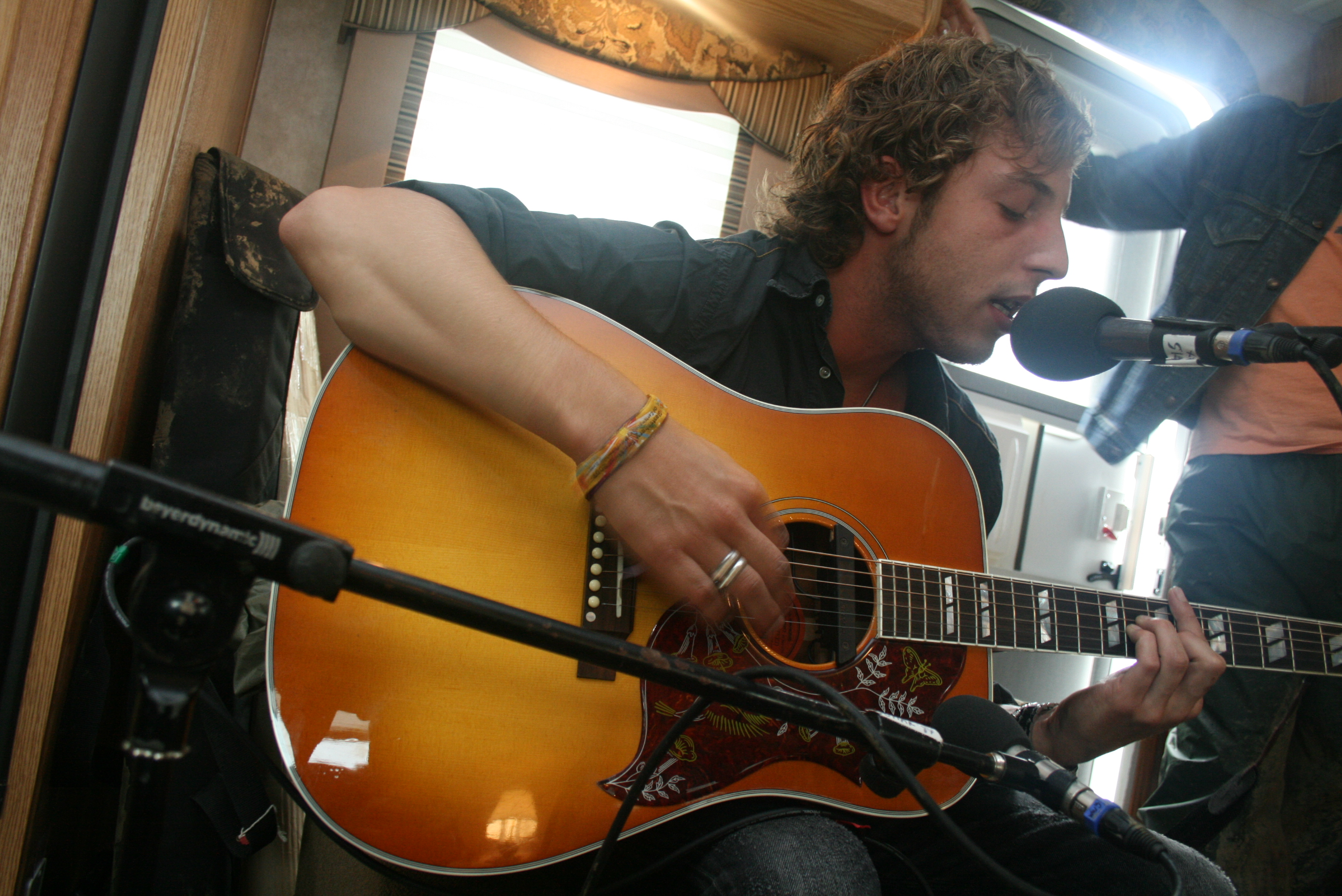
"You Give Me Something" by James Morrison was number one for a week.

Date	Artist	Single	Weeks at number one	Ref.
2 January	The Pussycat Dolls	"Stickwitu"	2 weeks	
9 January	The Black Eyed Peas	"My Humps"	2 weeks	
16 January	The Pussycat Dolls	"Stickwitu"	2 weeks	
23 January	Sugababes	"Push the Button"	3 weeks	
30 January	Sugababes	"Push the Button"	3 weeks	
6 February	Sugababes	"Push the Button"	3 weeks	
13 February	Chris Brown featuring Juelz Santana	"Run It!"	4 weeks	
20 February	Chris Brown featuring Juelz Santana	"Run It!"	4 weeks	
27 February	Chris Brown featuring Juelz Santana	"Run It!"	4 weeks	
6 March	Chris Brown featuring Juelz Santana	"Run It!"	4 weeks	
13 March	Beyoncé featuring Slim Thug	"Check on It"	2 weeks	
20 March	Beyoncé featuring Slim Thug	"Check on It"	2 weeks	
27 March	The Pussycat Dolls featuring will.i.am	"Beep"	7 weeks	
3 April	The Pussycat Dolls featuring will.i.am	"Beep"	7 weeks	
10 April	The Pussycat Dolls featuring will.i.am	"Beep"	7 weeks	
17 April	The Pussycat Dolls featuring will.i.am	"Beep"	7 weeks	
24 April	The Pussycat Dolls featuring will.i.am	"Beep"	7 weeks	
1 May	The Pussycat Dolls featuring will.i.am	"Beep"	7 weeks	
8 May	The Pussycat Dolls featuring will.i.am	"Beep"	7 weeks	
15 May	Busta Rhymes	"Touch It"	1 week	
22 May	Shakira featuring Wyclef Jean	"Hips Don't Lie"	1 week	
29 May	Gnarls Barkley	"Crazy"	7 weeks	
5 June	Gnarls Barkley	"Crazy"	7 weeks	
12 June	Gnarls Barkley	"Crazy"	7 weeks	
19 June	Gnarls Barkley	"Crazy"	7 weeks	
26 June	Gnarls Barkley	"Crazy"	7 weeks	
3 July	Gnarls Barkley	"Crazy"	7 weeks	
10 July	Gnarls Barkley	"Crazy"	7 weeks	
17 July	The Pussycat Dolls featuring Snoop Dogg	"Buttons"	1 week	
24 July	Nelly Furtado featuring Timbaland	"Promiscuous"	5 weeks	
31 July	Nelly Furtado featuring Timbaland	"Promiscuous"	5 weeks	
7 August	Nelly Furtado featuring Timbaland	"Promiscuous"	5 weeks	
14 August	Nelly Furtado featuring Timbaland	"Promiscuous"	5 weeks	
21 August	Nelly Furtado featuring Timbaland	"Promiscuous"	5 weeks	
28 August	Justin Timberlake featuring Timbaland	"SexyBack"	7 weeks	
4 September	Justin Timberlake featuring Timbaland	"SexyBack"	7 weeks	
11 September	Justin Timberlake featuring Timbaland	"SexyBack"	7 weeks	
18 September	Justin Timberlake featuring Timbaland	"SexyBack"	7 weeks	
25 September	Justin Timberlake featuring Timbaland	"SexyBack"	7 weeks	
2 October	Fergie	"London Bridge"	1 week	
9 October	Boyband	"You Really Got Me"	1 week	
16 October	Justin Timberlake featuring Timbaland	"SexyBack"	7 weeks	
23 October	Justin Timberlake featuring Timbaland	"SexyBack"	7 weeks	
30 October	James Morrison	"You Give Me Something"	1 week	
6 November	Matthew Saunoa	"Hold Out"	1 week	
13 November	Justin Timberlake featuring T.I.	"My Love"	5 weeks	
20 November	Justin Timberlake featuring T.I.	"My Love"	5 weeks	
27 November	Justin Timberlake featuring T.I.	"My Love"	5 weeks	
4 December	Justin Timberlake featuring T.I.	"My Love"	5 weeks	
11 December	Beyoncé	"Irreplaceable"	1 week	
18 December	Justin Timberlake featuring T.I.	"My Love"	5 weeks	
25 December	Gwen Stefani	"Wind It Up"	2 weeks	

== 2007 ==
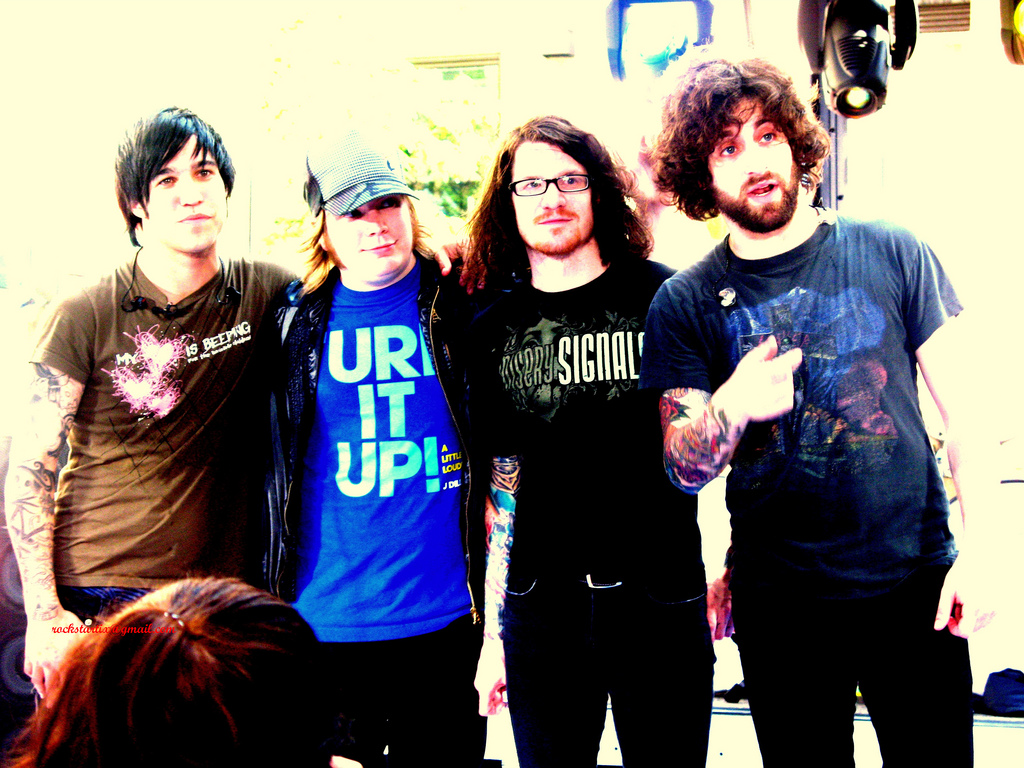
"This Ain't a Scene, It's an Arms Race" by Fall Out Boy spent one week at number one.

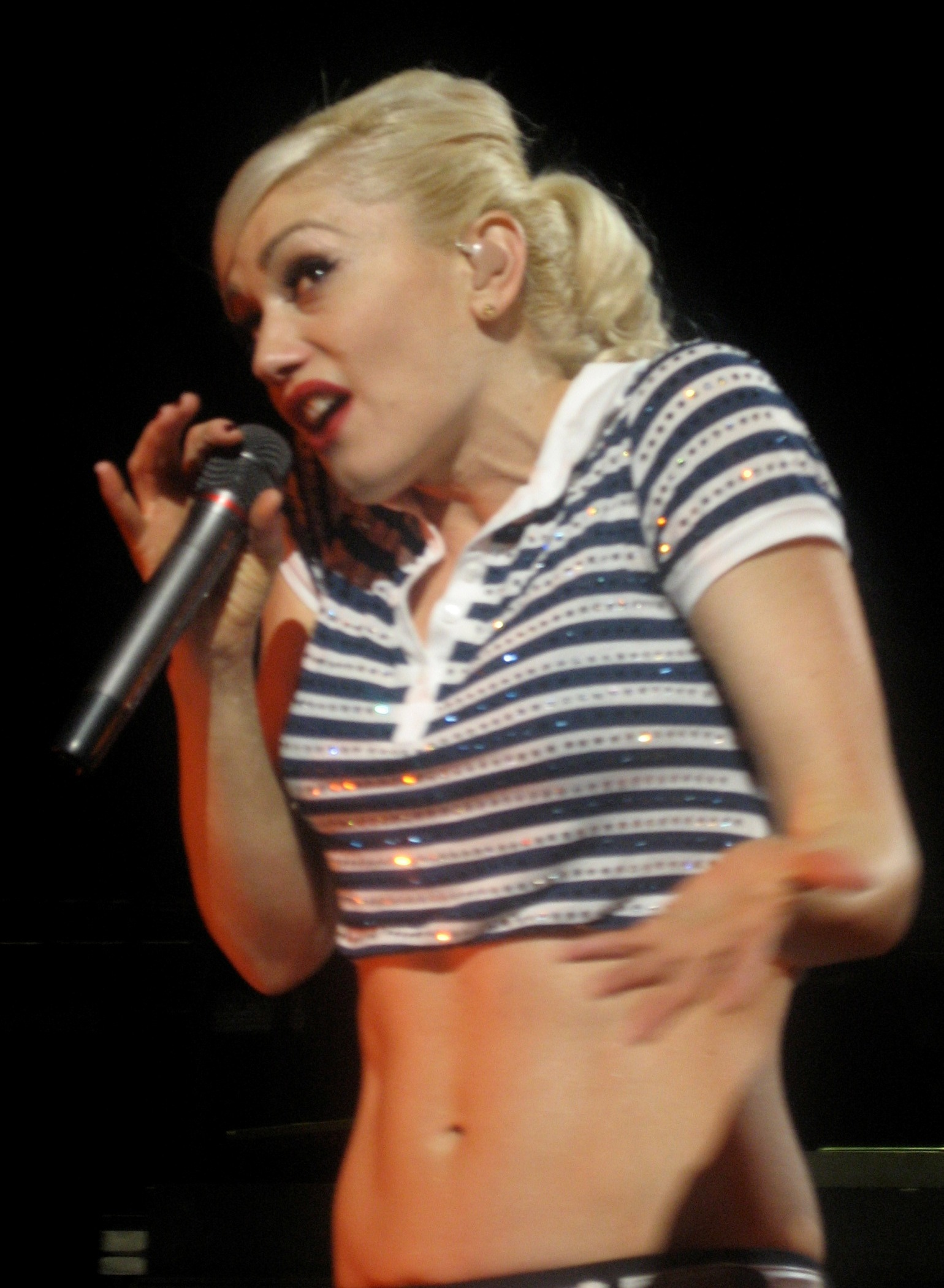
Gwen Stefani's "Wind It Up" and "The Sweet Escape" both made it to number one.

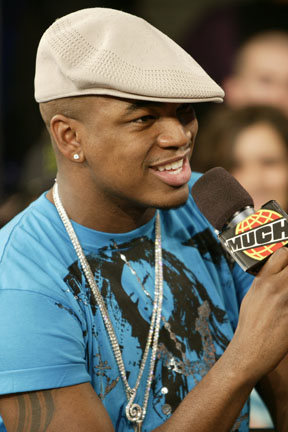
Ne-Yo's first New Zealand number-one single was "Because of You", and his second was "Knock You Down".

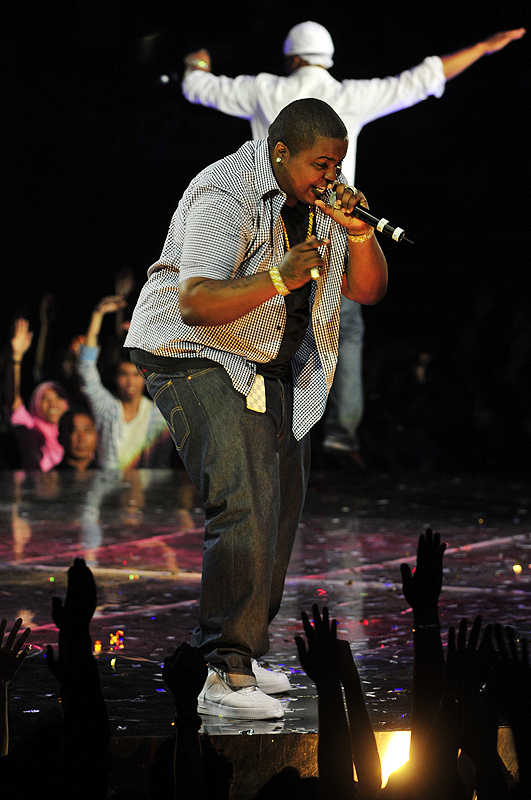
"Beautiful Girls", the debut single by Sean Kingston, spent six weeks at number one.

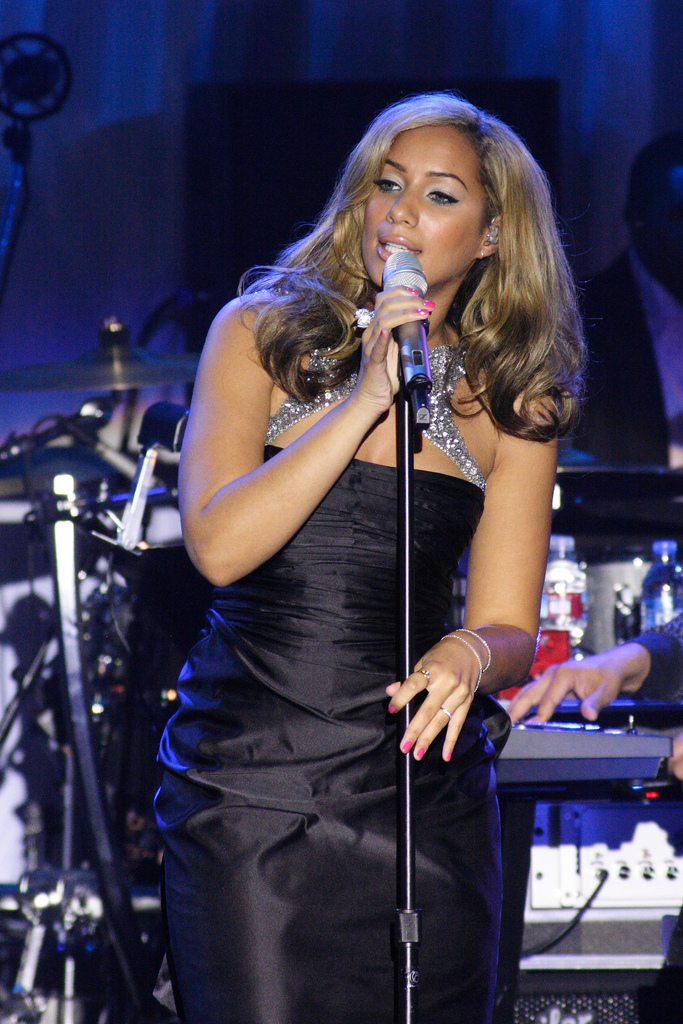
Leona Lewis' debut appearance on the New Zealand Singles Chart was chart-topper "Bleeding Love".

Date	Artist	Single	Weeks at number one	Ref.
1 January	Gwen Stefani	"Wind It Up"	2 weeks	
8 January	Akon featuring Eminem	"Smack That"	4 weeks	
15 January	Nelly Furtado	"Say It Right"	1 week	
22 January	Akon featuring Eminem	"Smack That"	4 weeks	
29 January	Akon featuring Eminem	"Smack That"	4 weeks	
5 February	Akon featuring Eminem	"Smack That"	4 weeks	
12 February	Hinder	"Lips of an Angel"	2 weeks	
19 February	Hinder	"Lips of an Angel"	2 weeks	
26 February	Fall Out Boy	"This Ain't a Scene, It's an Arms Race"	1 week	
5 March	Gwen Stefani featuring Akon	"The Sweet Escape"	1 week	
12 March	Atlas	"Crawl"	7 weeks	
19 March	Atlas	"Crawl"	7 weeks	
26 March	Atlas	"Crawl"	7 weeks	
2 April	Atlas	"Crawl"	7 weeks	
9 April	Atlas	"Crawl"	7 weeks	
16 April	Atlas	"Crawl"	7 weeks	
23 April	Beyoncé and Shakira	"Beautiful Liar"	1 week	
30 April	Atlas	"Crawl"	7 weeks	
7 May	Avril Lavigne	"Girlfriend"	1 week	
14 May	Akon	"Don't Matter"	2 weeks	
21 May	Akon	"Don't Matter"	2 weeks	
28 May	Ne-Yo	"Because of You"	1 week	
4 June	Rihanna featuring Jay-Z	"Umbrella"	6 weeks	
11 June	Rihanna featuring Jay-Z	"Umbrella"	6 weeks	
18 June	Rihanna featuring Jay-Z	"Umbrella"	6 weeks	
25 June	Rihanna featuring Jay-Z	"Umbrella"	6 weeks	
2 July	Rihanna featuring Jay-Z	"Umbrella"	6 weeks	
9 July	Rihanna featuring Jay-Z	"Umbrella"	6 weeks	
16 July	T-Pain featuring Akon	"Bartender"	1 week	
23 July	Fergie	"Big Girls Don't Cry"	1 week	
30 July	Sean Kingston	"Beautiful Girls"	6 weeks	
6 August	Sean Kingston	"Beautiful Girls"	6 weeks	
13 August	Sean Kingston	"Beautiful Girls"	6 weeks	
20 August	Sean Kingston	"Beautiful Girls"	6 weeks	
27 August	Sean Kingston	"Beautiful Girls"	6 weeks	
3 September	Sean Kingston	"Beautiful Girls"	6 weeks	
10 September	Kanye West	"Stronger"	1 week	
17 September	50 Cent featuring Justin Timberlake and Timbaland	"Ayo Technology"	3 weeks	
24 September	50 Cent featuring Justin Timberlake and Timbaland	"Ayo Technology"	3 weeks	
1 October	50 Cent featuring Justin Timberlake and Timbaland	"Ayo Technology"	3 weeks	
8 October	Chris Brown featuring T-Pain	"Kiss Kiss"	3 weeks	
15 October	Chris Brown featuring T-Pain	"Kiss Kiss"	3 weeks	
22 October	Chris Brown featuring T-Pain	"Kiss Kiss"	3 weeks	
29 October	Timbaland featuring OneRepublic	"Apologize"	7 weeks	
5 November	Timbaland featuring OneRepublic	"Apologize"	7 weeks	
12 November	Timbaland featuring OneRepublic	"Apologize"	7 weeks	
19 November	Timbaland featuring OneRepublic	"Apologize"	7 weeks	
26 November	Timbaland featuring OneRepublic	"Apologize"	7 weeks	
3 December	Timbaland featuring OneRepublic	"Apologize"	7 weeks	
10 December	Timbaland featuring OneRepublic	"Apologize"	7 weeks	
17 December	Leona Lewis	"Bleeding Love"	5 weeks	
24 December	The Underdogs	"A Very Silent Night"	1 week	
31 December	Leona Lewis	"Bleeding Love"	5 weeks	

== 2008 ==
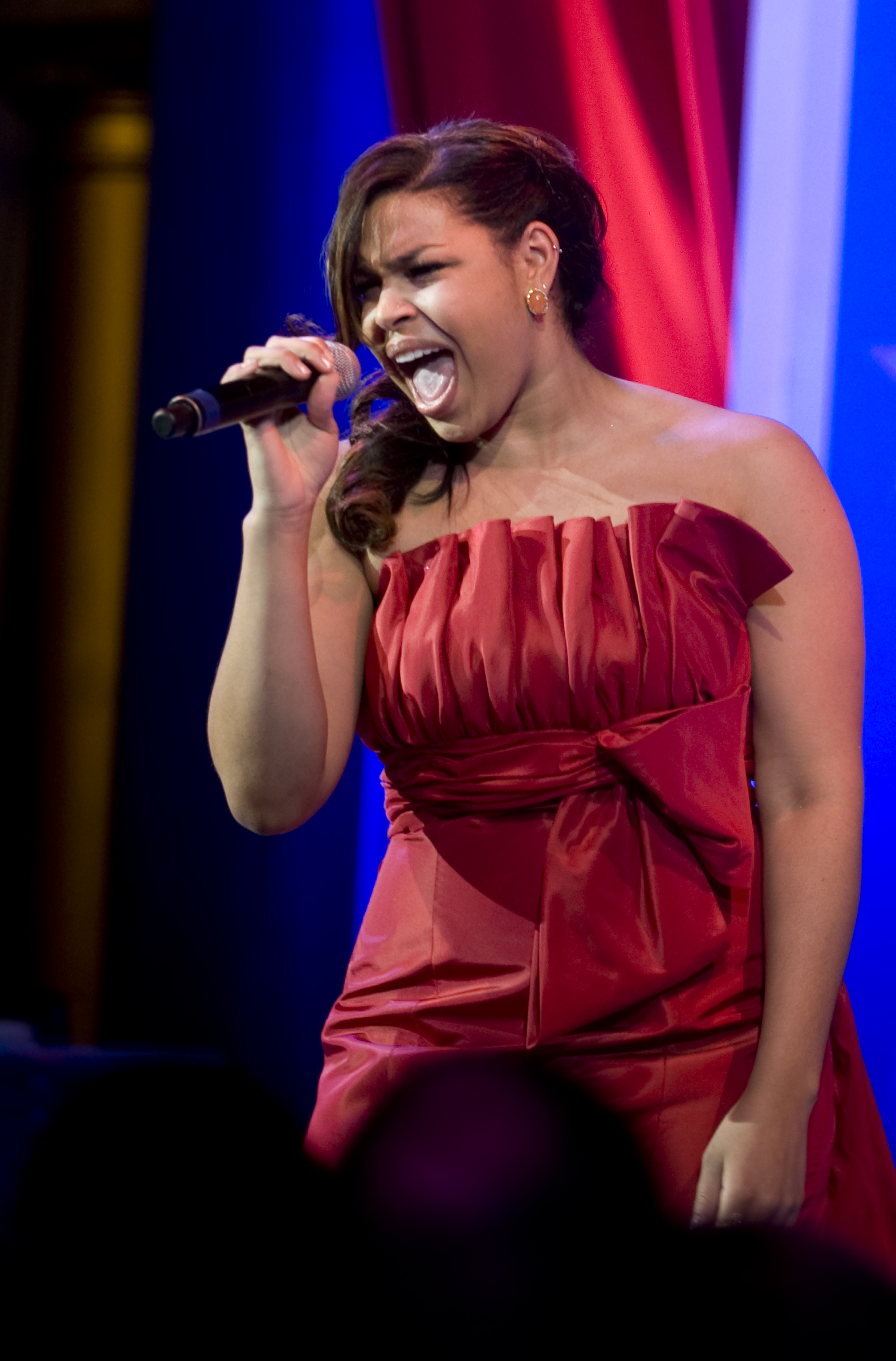
Jordin Sparks' "No Air", which featured Chris Brown, topped the chart for seven weeks, securing its place at number one on the 2008 annual chart.

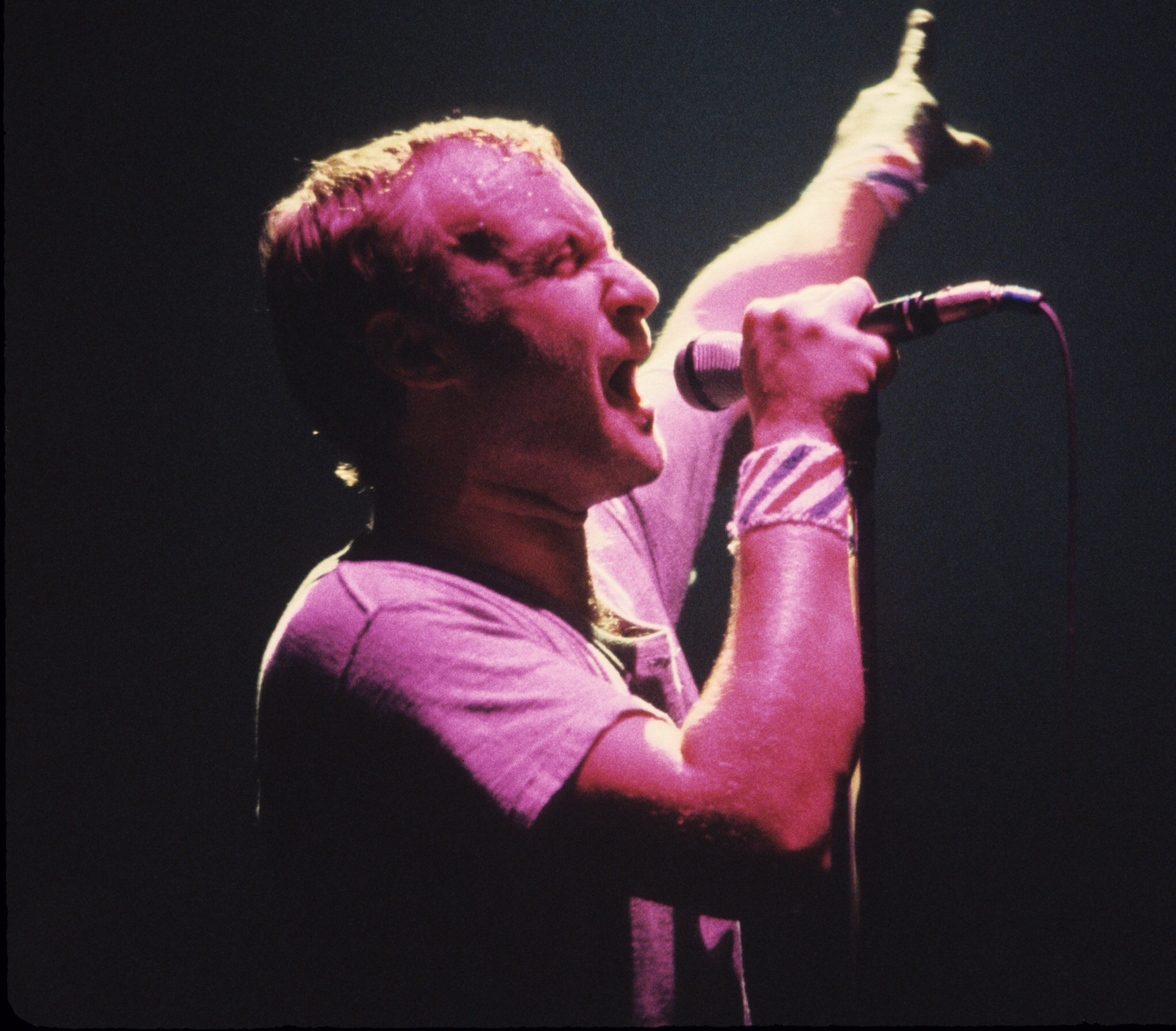
Originally released in 1981, Phil Collins' "In the Air Tonight" reached number one for two weeks in 2008 via its use in a TV advert.

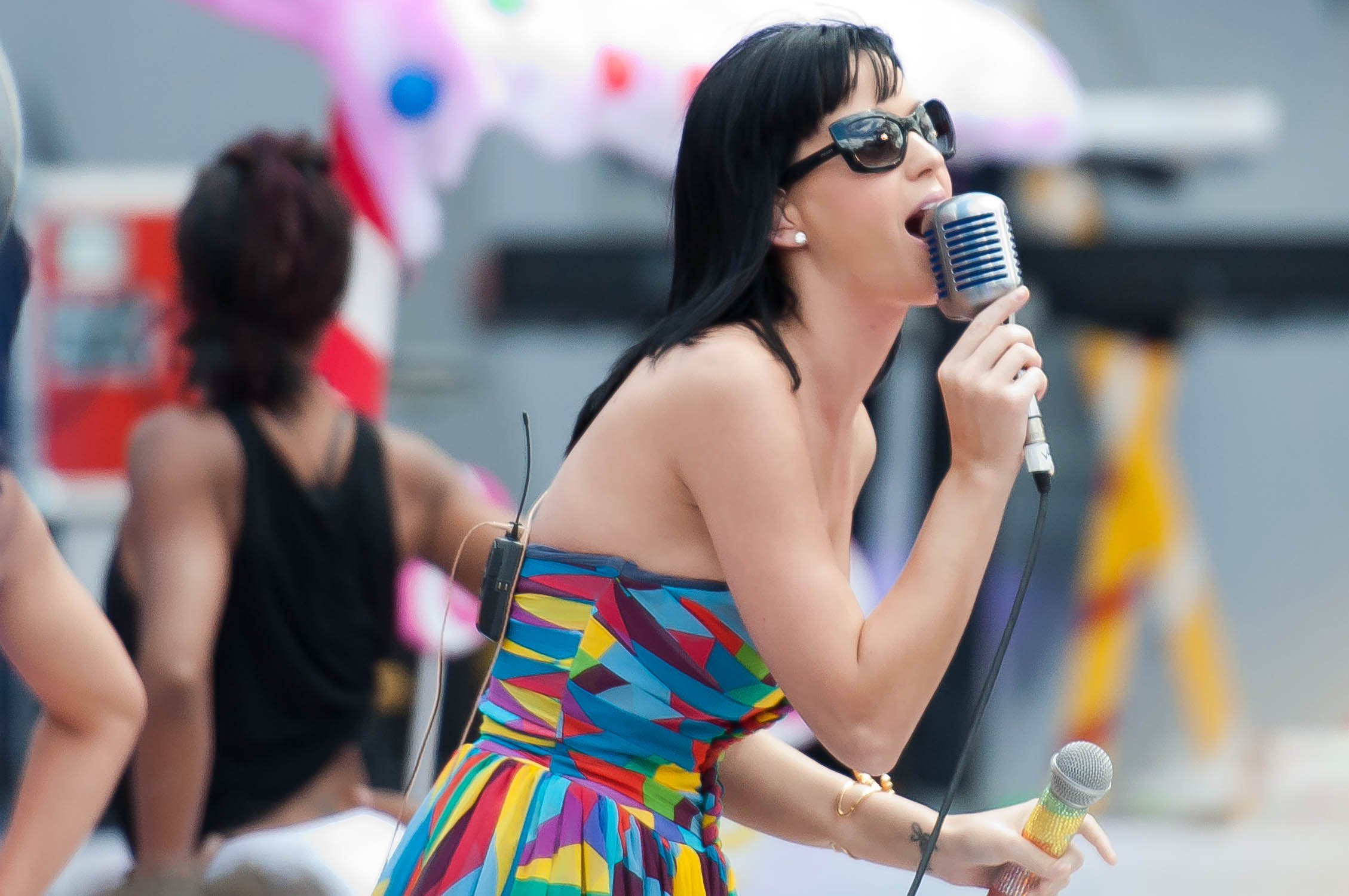
"I Kissed a Girl" by Katy Perry spent a week at the top of the chart.

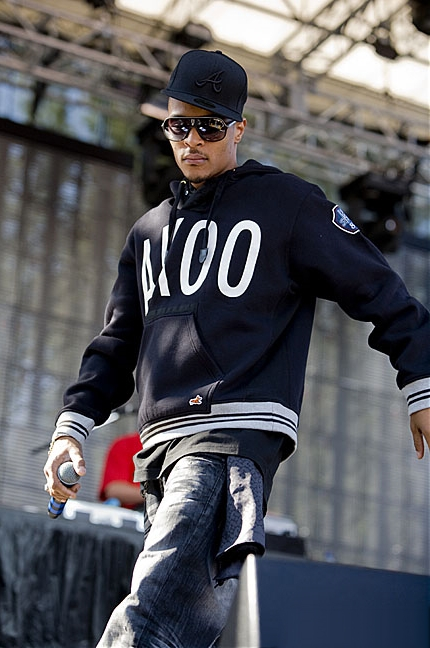
T.I. had number-one singles in New Zealand with "My Love" and "Whatever You Like".

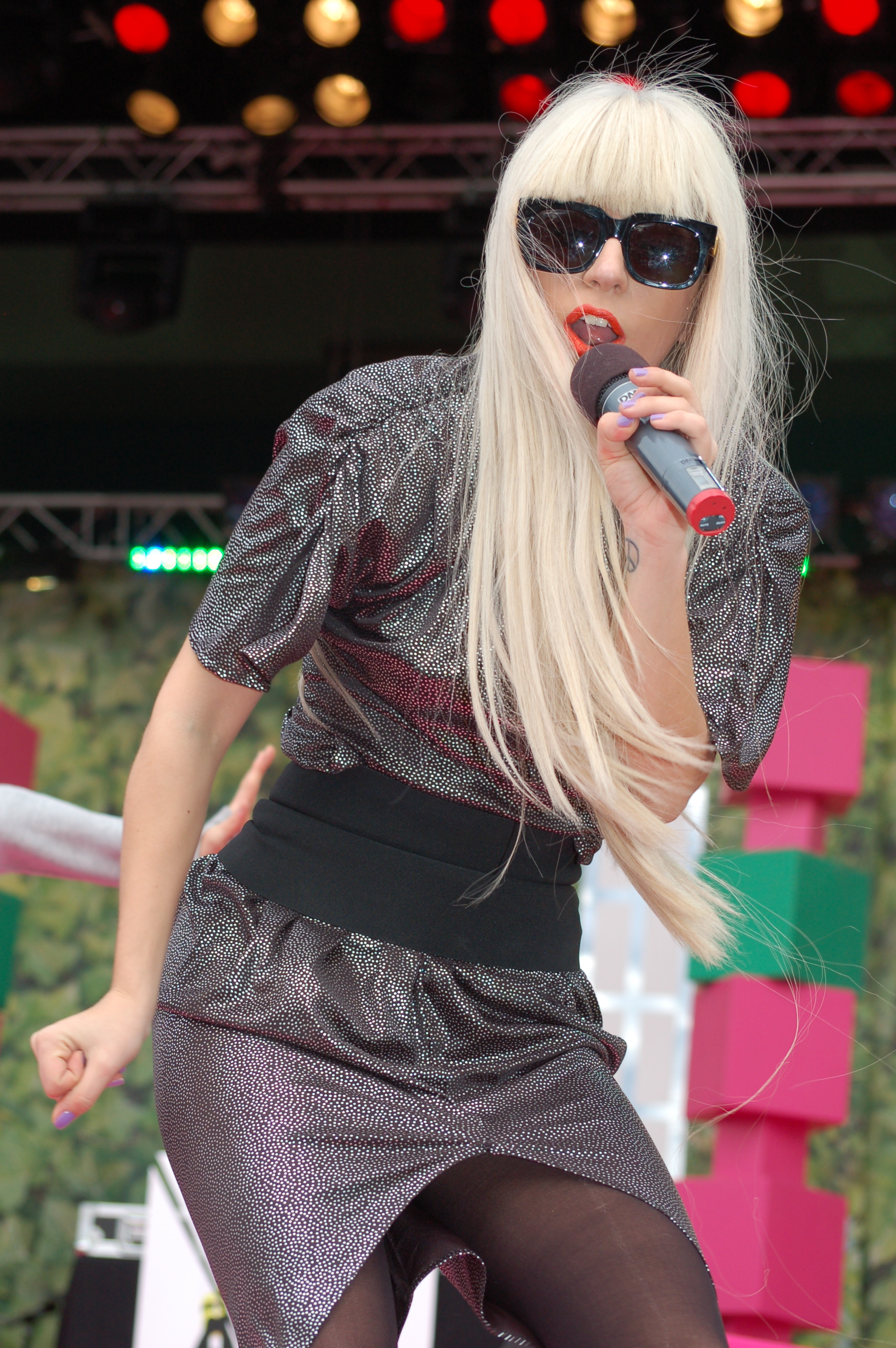
"Poker Face" by Lady Gaga remained as the number-one single in New Zealand for ten weeks.

Date	Artist	Single	Weeks at number one	Ref.
7 January	Leona Lewis	"Bleeding Love"	5 weeks	
14 January	Leona Lewis	"Bleeding Love"	5 weeks	
21 January	Leona Lewis	"Bleeding Love"	5 weeks	
28 January	Flo Rida featuring T-Pain	"Low"	3 weeks	
4 February	Flo Rida featuring T-Pain	"Low"	3 weeks	
11 February	Flo Rida featuring T-Pain	"Low"	3 weeks	
18 February	Chris Brown	"With You"	4 weeks	
25 February	Chris Brown	"With You"	4 weeks	
3 March	Chris Brown	"With You"	4 weeks	
10 March	Chris Brown	"With You"	4 weeks	
17 March	Jordin Sparks and Chris Brown	"No Air"	7 weeks	
24 March	Jordin Sparks and Chris Brown	"No Air"	7 weeks	
31 March	Jordin Sparks and Chris Brown	"No Air"	7 weeks	
7 April	Jordin Sparks and Chris Brown	"No Air"	7 weeks	
14 April	Jordin Sparks and Chris Brown	"No Air"	7 weeks	
21 April	Jordin Sparks and Chris Brown	"No Air"	7 weeks	
28 April	Jordin Sparks and Chris Brown	"No Air"	7 weeks	
5 May	Usher featuring Young Jeezy	"Love in This Club"	1 week	
12 May	Chris Brown	"Forever"	8 weeks	
19 May	Chris Brown	"Forever"	8 weeks	
26 May	Chris Brown	"Forever"	8 weeks	
2 June	Chris Brown	"Forever"	8 weeks	
9 June	Chris Brown	"Forever"	8 weeks	
16 June	Chris Brown	"Forever"	8 weeks	
23 June	Chris Brown	"Forever"	8 weeks	
30 June	Chris Brown	"Forever"	8 weeks	
7 July	Tiki Taane	"Always on My Mind"	2 weeks	
14 July	Tiki Taane	"Always on My Mind"	2 weeks	
21 July	Phil Collins	"In the Air Tonight"	2 weeks	
28 July	Phil Collins	"In the Air Tonight"	2 weeks	
4 August	Nesian Mystik	"Nesian 101"	1 week	
11 August	Katy Perry	"I Kissed a Girl"	1 week	
18 August	Rihanna	"Disturbia"	3 weeks	
25 August	Rihanna	"Disturbia"	3 weeks	
1 September	Rihanna	"Disturbia"	3 weeks	
8 September	P!nk	"So What"	5 weeks	
15 September	P!nk	"So What"	5 weeks	
22 September	P!nk	"So What"	5 weeks	
29 September	P!nk	"So What"	5 weeks	
6 October	P!nk	"So What"	5 weeks	
13 October	P-Money featuring Vince Harder	"Everything"	3 weeks	
20 October	T.I.	"Whatever You Like"	1 week	
27 October	P-Money featuring Vince Harder	"Everything"	3 weeks	
3 November	P-Money featuring Vince Harder	"Everything"	3 weeks	
10 November	Lady Gaga	"Poker Face"	10 weeks	
17 November	Lady Gaga	"Poker Face"	10 weeks	
24 November	Lady Gaga	"Poker Face"	10 weeks	
1 December	Lady Gaga	"Poker Face"	10 weeks	
8 December	Lady Gaga	"Poker Face"	10 weeks	
15 December	Lady Gaga	"Poker Face"	10 weeks	
22 December	Lady Gaga	"Poker Face"	10 weeks	
29 December	Lady Gaga	"Poker Face"	10 weeks	

== 2009 ==
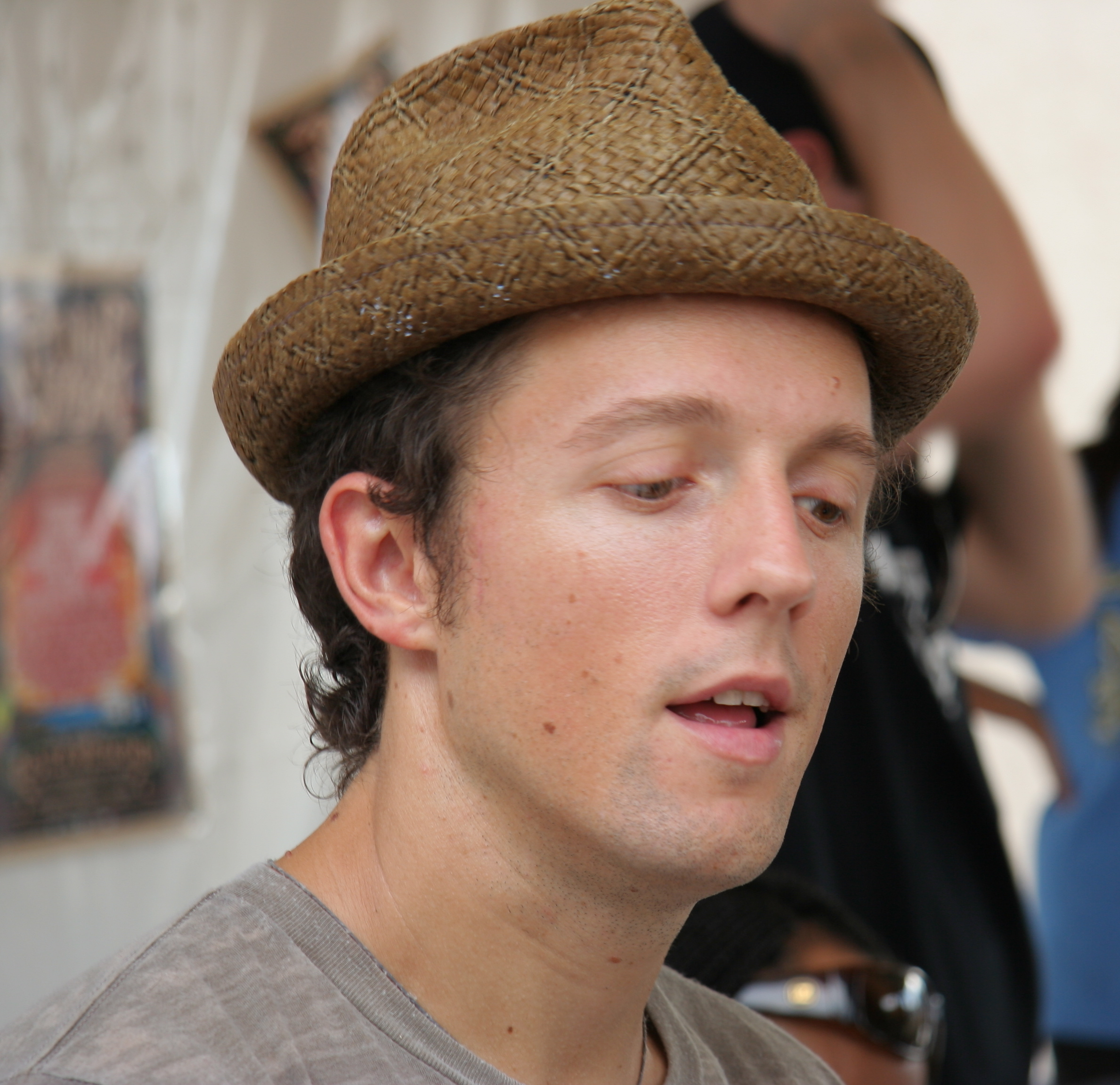
Jason Mraz achieved his first New Zealand number-one single with "I'm Yours".

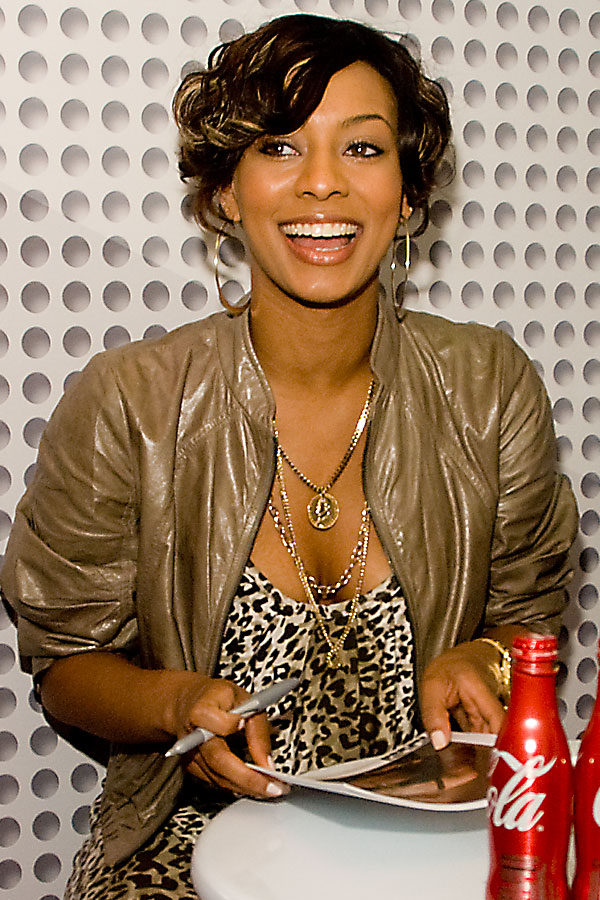
Keri Hilson's first chart-topper was "Knock You Down", which also featured R&B singer Ne-Yo and rapper Kanye West.

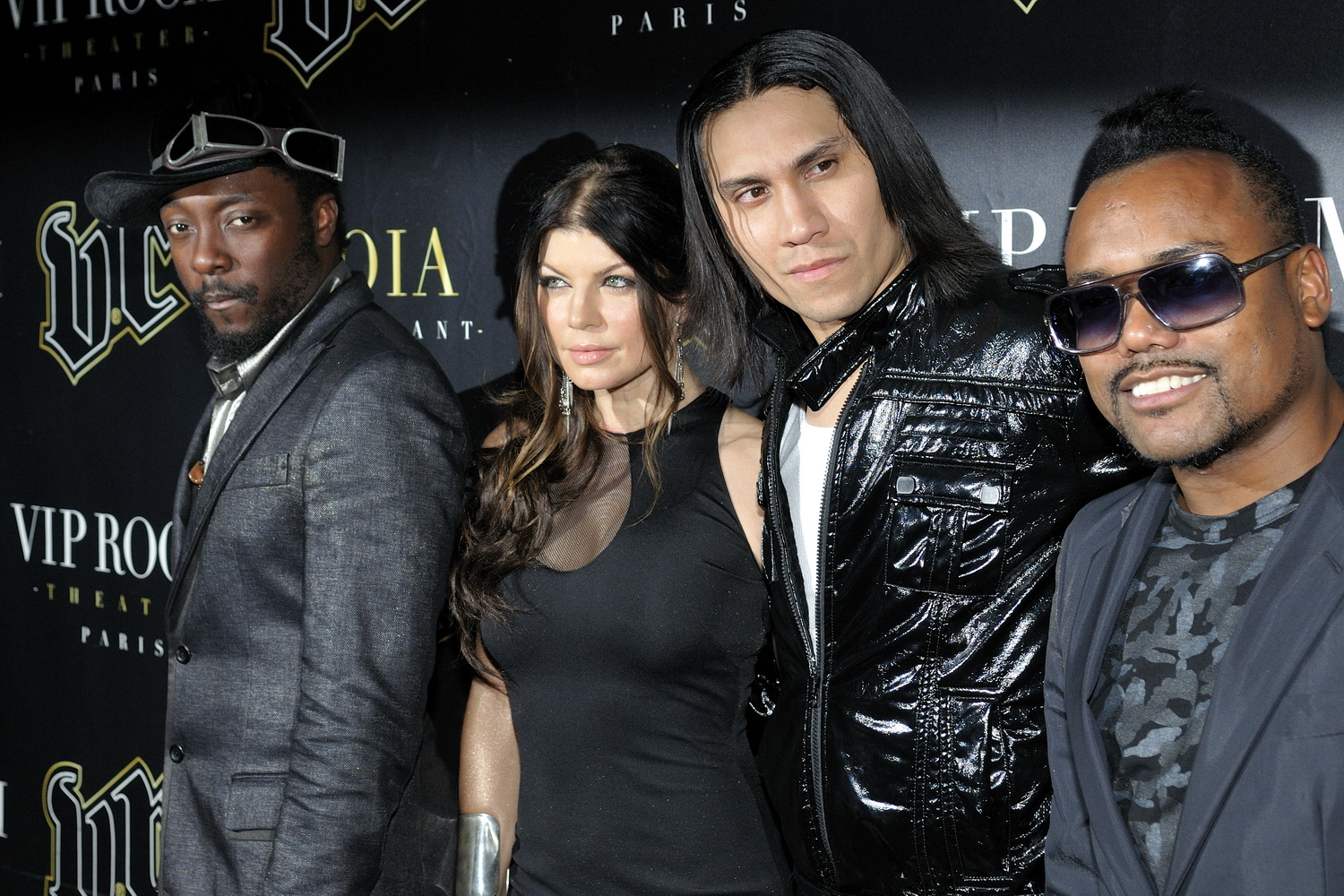
The Black Eyed Peas achieved five number-ones: "Where is the Love?", "Shut Up", "Don't Phunk With My Heart", "My Humps" and the top single of 2009, "I Gotta Feeling".

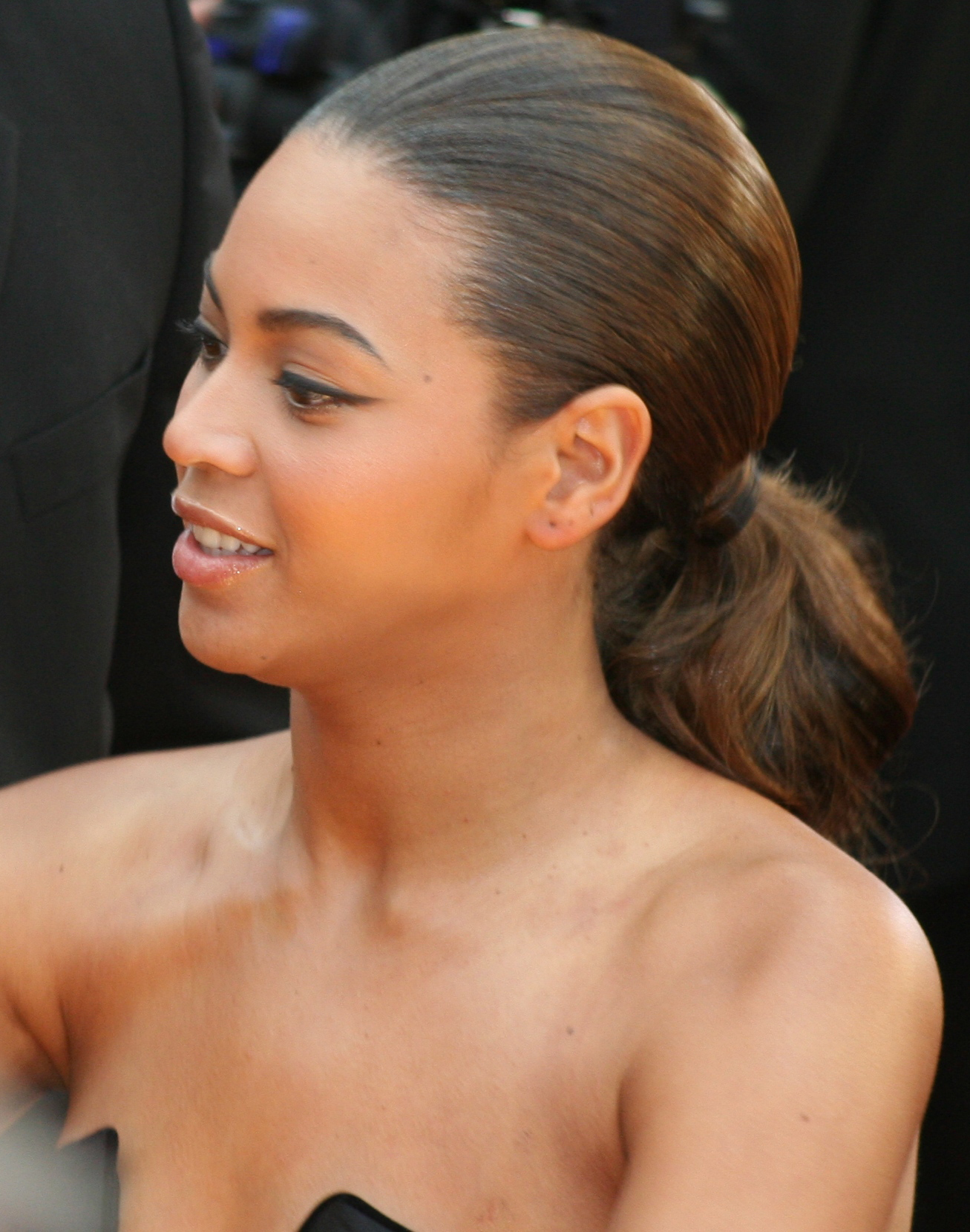
Beyoncé scored four number-one singles with "Check on It", "Irreplaceable", "Beautiful Liar" and "Sweet Dreams". Prior to the band's split, she was part of Destiny's Child, whose single "Independent Women Part I" topped the chart.

Date	Artist	Single	Weeks at number one	Ref.
5 January	Lady Gaga	"Poker Face"	10 weeks	
12 January	Lady Gaga	"Poker Face"	10 weeks	
19 January	Jason Mraz	"I'm Yours"	5 weeks	
26 January	Jason Mraz	"I'm Yours"	5 weeks	
2 February	Jason Mraz	"I'm Yours"	5 weeks	
9 February	Jason Mraz	"I'm Yours"	5 weeks	
16 February	Jason Mraz	"I'm Yours"	5 weeks	
23 February	Smashproof featuring Gin Wigmore	"Brother"	11 weeks	
2 March	Smashproof featuring Gin Wigmore	"Brother"	11 weeks	
9 March	Smashproof featuring Gin Wigmore	"Brother"	11 weeks	
16 March	Smashproof featuring Gin Wigmore	"Brother"	11 weeks	
23 March	Smashproof featuring Gin Wigmore	"Brother"	11 weeks	
30 March	Smashproof featuring Gin Wigmore	"Brother"	11 weeks	
6 April	Smashproof featuring Gin Wigmore	"Brother"	11 weeks	
13 April	Smashproof featuring Gin Wigmore	"Brother"	11 weeks	
20 April	Smashproof featuring Gin Wigmore	"Brother"	11 weeks	
27 April	Smashproof featuring Gin Wigmore	"Brother"	11 weeks	
4 May	Smashproof featuring Gin Wigmore	"Brother"	11 weeks	
11 May	Eminem	"We Made You"	1 week	
18 May	Keri Hilson featuring Kanye West and Ne-Yo	"Knock You Down"	6 weeks	
25 May	Keri Hilson featuring Kanye West and Ne-Yo	"Knock You Down"	6 weeks	
1 June	Keri Hilson featuring Kanye West and Ne-Yo	"Knock You Down"	6 weeks	
8 June	Keri Hilson featuring Kanye West and Ne-Yo	"Knock You Down"	6 weeks	
15 June	Keri Hilson featuring Kanye West and Ne-Yo	"Knock You Down"	6 weeks	
22 June	Keri Hilson featuring Kanye West and Ne-Yo	"Knock You Down"	6 weeks	
29 June	The Black Eyed Peas	"I Gotta Feeling"	9 weeks	
6 July	The Black Eyed Peas	"I Gotta Feeling"	9 weeks	
13 July	The Black Eyed Peas	"I Gotta Feeling"	9 weeks	
20 July	The Black Eyed Peas	"I Gotta Feeling"	9 weeks	
27 July	The Black Eyed Peas	"I Gotta Feeling"	9 weeks	
3 August	The Black Eyed Peas	"I Gotta Feeling"	9 weeks	
10 August	The Black Eyed Peas	"I Gotta Feeling"	9 weeks	
17 August	The Black Eyed Peas	"I Gotta Feeling"	9 weeks	
24 August	The Black Eyed Peas	"I Gotta Feeling"	9 weeks	
31 August	Beyoncé	"Sweet Dreams"	3 weeks	
7 September	Beyoncé	"Sweet Dreams"	3 weeks	
14 September	Beyoncé	"Sweet Dreams"	3 weeks	
21 September	David Guetta featuring Akon	"Sexy Bitch"	3 weeks	
28 September	David Guetta featuring Akon	"Sexy Bitch"	3 weeks	
5 October	David Guetta featuring Akon	"Sexy Bitch"	3 weeks	
12 October	Kesha	"TiK ToK"	5 weeks	
19 October	Kesha	"TiK ToK"	5 weeks	
26 October	Kesha	"TiK ToK"	5 weeks	
2 November	Kesha	"TiK ToK"	5 weeks	
9 November	Kesha	"TiK ToK"	5 weeks	
16 November	Jason Derulo	"Whatcha Say"	3 weeks	
23 November	Jason Derulo	"Whatcha Say"	3 weeks	
30 November	Jason Derulo	"Whatcha Say"	3 weeks	
7 December	Stan Walker	"Black Box"	10 weeks (6 in 2010)	
14 December	Stan Walker	"Black Box"	10 weeks (6 in 2010)	
21 December	Stan Walker	"Black Box"	10 weeks (6 in 2010)	
28 December	Stan Walker	"Black Box"	10 weeks (6 in 2010)	

== Artists with the most number-one songs ==
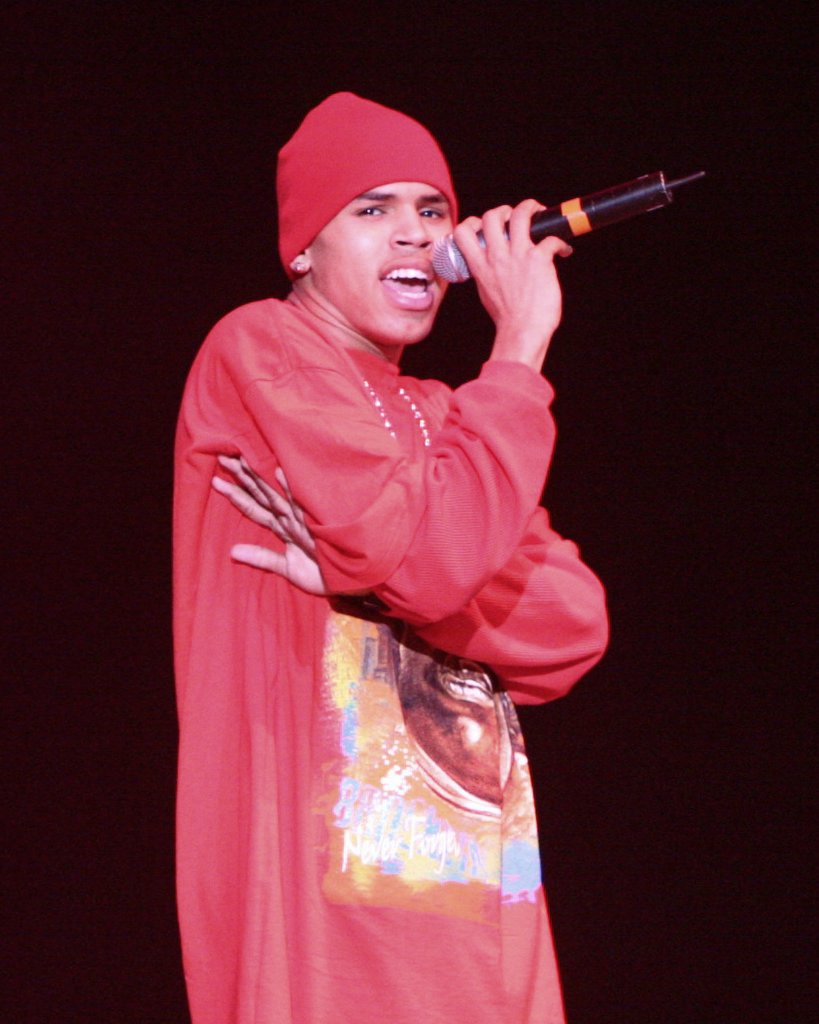
Chris Brown achieved five number-one singles this decade: "Run It!", "Kiss Kiss", "With You", "No Air" and "Forever".

These totals includes singles when the artist is "featured"; that is, not the main artist

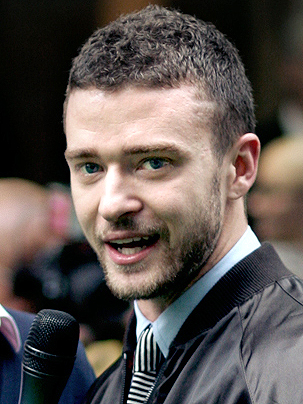
Justin Timberlake scored two number-one singles from FutureSex/LoveSounds—"SexyBack" and "My Love"—as well as two featured singles: "Where is the Love?" and "Ayo Technology".

Artist	Number-one singles	Longest run	Total weeks at number one
Akon	7	"Moonshine" (7 weeks)	23
Chris Brown	5	"Forever" (8 weeks)	25
Eminem	5	"Without Me" (7 weeks)	21
The Black Eyed Peas	5	"I Gotta Feeling" (9 weeks)	18^{A}
Timbaland	4	"Apologize" (7 weeks)	23
Justin Timberlake	4	"SexyBack" (7 weeks)	19
Pink	4	"So What" (5 weeks)	13
Pussycat Dolls	4	"Beep" (7 weeks)	12
Christina Aguilera	4	"What a Girl Wants" (5 weeks)	11
Beyoncé	4	"Sweet Dreams" (3 weeks)	7^{B}
Scribe	3	"Stand Up"/"Not Many" (12 weeks)	16
Crazy Frog	3	"Axel F" (11 weeks)	16
Atomic Kitten	3	"Whole Again" (6 weeks)	11
Shakira	3	"Whenever, Wherever" (8 weeks)	10
Rihanna	3	"Umbrella" (6 weeks)	10
Kanye West	3	"Knock You Down" (6 weeks)	9
Nelly Furtado	3	"Promiscuous" (5 weeks)	8
Usher	3	"Yeah!" (4 weeks)	8
Robbie Williams	3	"Rock DJ" (4 weeks)	6
T-Pain	3	"Low" (3 weeks)	6

Excluded statistics
^AThis excludes band members' individual number-ones. "Beep", by will.i.am, and Fergie's "London Bridge" and "Big Girls Don't Cry" also reached number one.
^BThis excludes "Independent Women Part I", by Beyoncé's former band, Destiny's Child.

== Most weeks at number-one ==
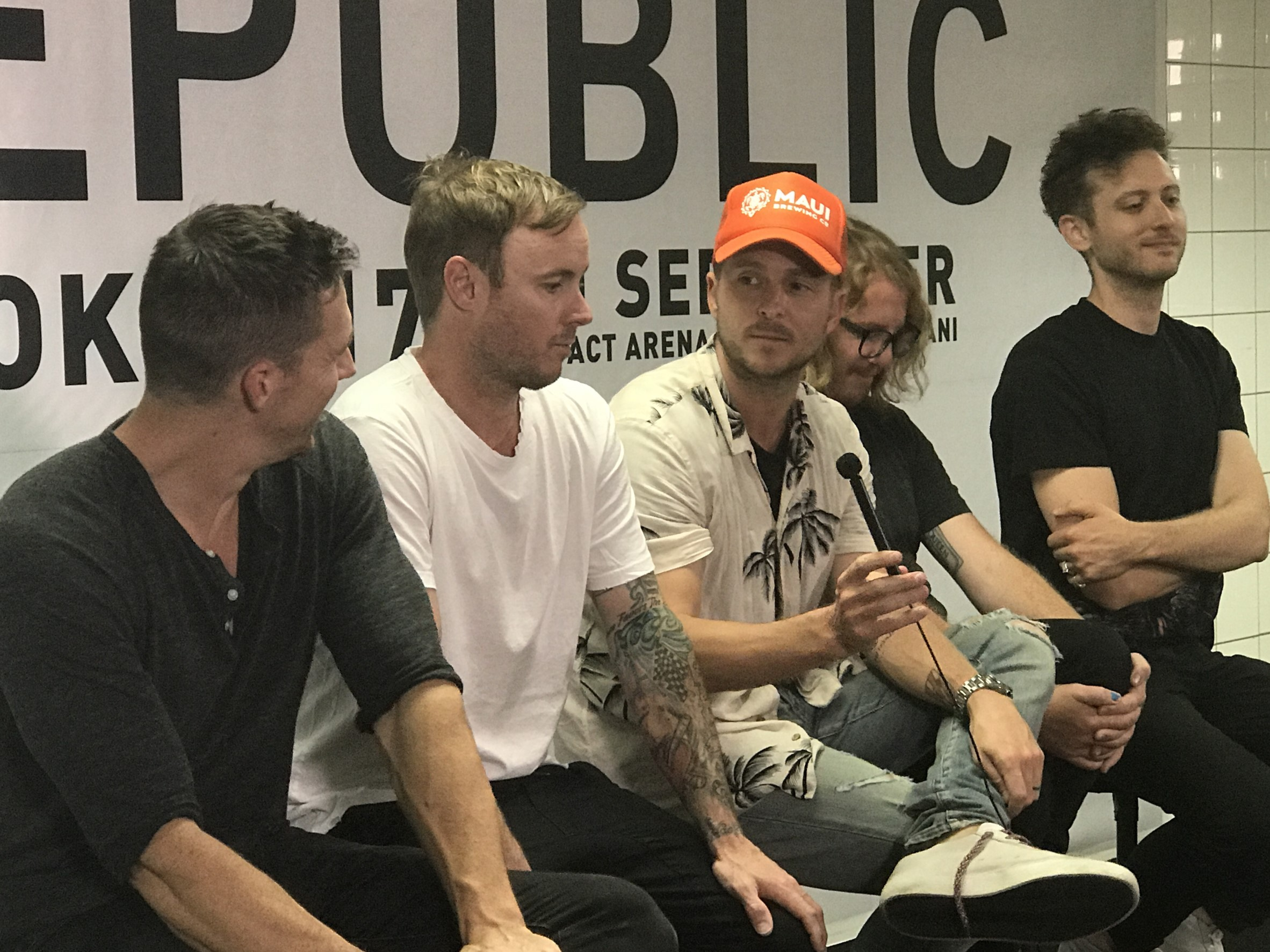
OneRepublic, working together with Timbaland, spent seven weeks at the top of the chart with "Apologize".

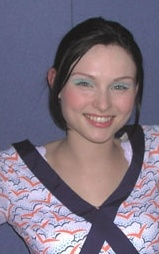
"Groovejet (If This Ain't Love)", which featured Sophie Ellis-Bextor, had a seven-week run at number one.

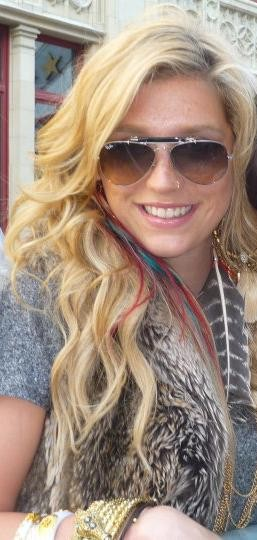
Kesha's "Tik Tok" ran for five weeks at number one.

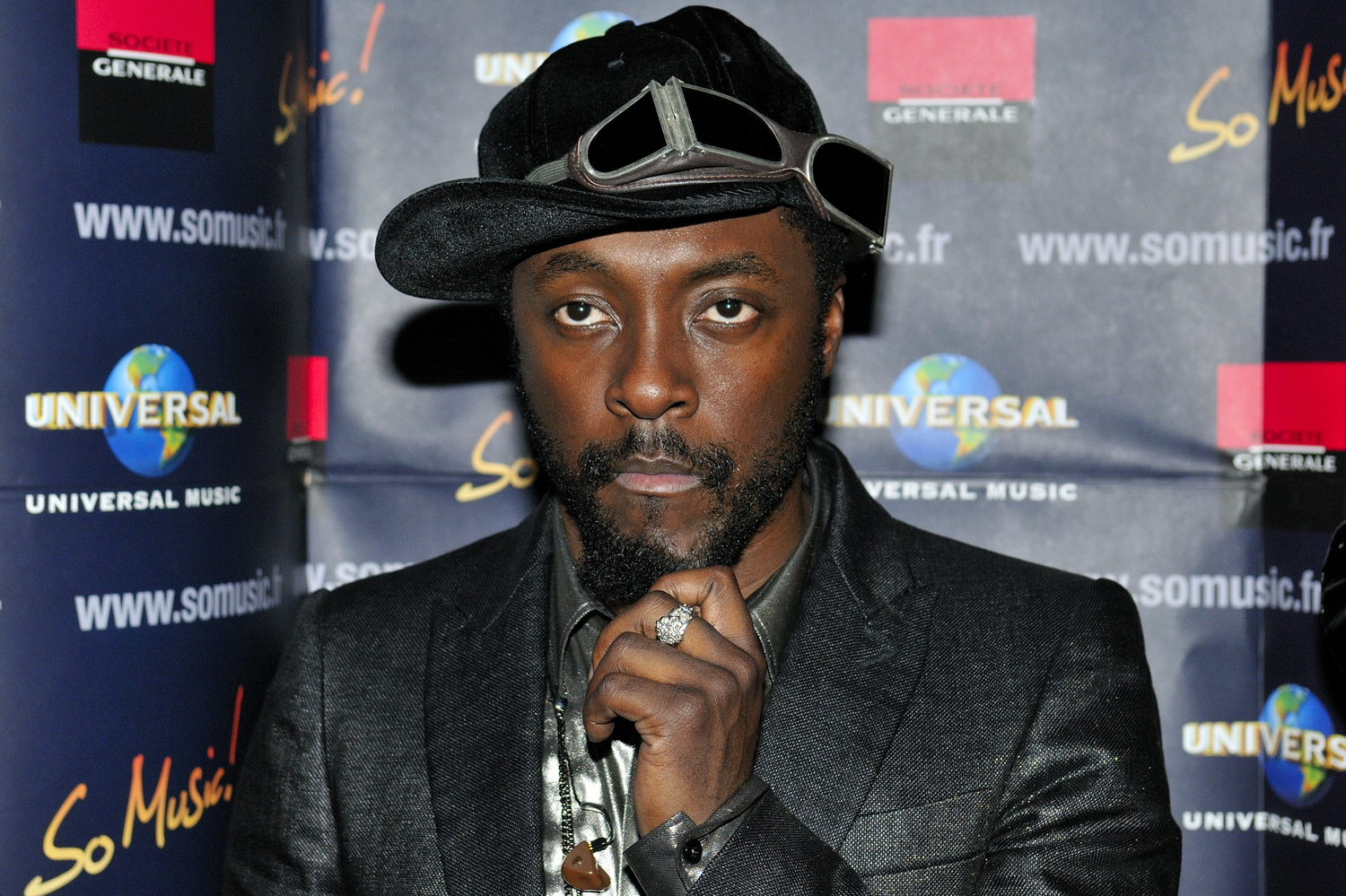
will.i.am had chart success with his band, the Black Eyed Peas, and independently with "Beep", in which he featured.

Title	Artist	Weeks at number one
"Stand Up"/"Not Many"	Scribe	12
"Axel F"	Crazy Frog	11
"Brother"	Smashproof featuring Gin Wigmore	11
"Poker Face"	Lady Gaga	10
"I Gotta Feeling"	The Black Eyed Peas	9
"Complicated"	Avril Lavigne	9
"Forever"	Chris Brown	8
"In da Club"	50 Cent	8
"Whenever, Wherever"	Shakira	8
"Apologize"	Timbaland featuring OneRepublic	7
"Beep"	Pussycat Dolls featuring will.i.am	7
"Crawl"	Atlas	7
"Crazy"	Gnarls Barkley	7
"Groovejet (If This Ain't Love)"	Spiller featuring Sophie Ellis-Bextor	7
"I'm Outta Love"	Anastacia	7
"No Air"	Jordin Sparks and Chris Brown	7
"The Ketchup Song"	Las Ketchup	7
"They Can't Take That Away"	Ben Lummis	7
"Moonshine"	Savage featuring Akon	7
"SexyBack"	Justin Timberlake featuring Timbaland	7
"Without Me"	Eminem	7
"Beautiful Girls"	Sean Kingston	6
"Knock You Down"	Keri Hilson featuring Kanye West and Ne-Yo	6
"Umbrella"	Rihanna featuring Jay-Z	6
"Whole Again"	Atomic Kitten	6
"What A Girl Wants"	Christina Aguilera	5
"Bleeding Love"	Leona Lewis	5
"Cruisin'"	Gwyneth Paltrow and Huey Lewis	5
"Fuck It (I Don't Want You Back)"	Eamon	5
"Ignition (Remix)"	R. Kelly	5
"I'm Yours"	Jason Mraz	5
"Just Lose It"	Eminem	5
"Let Me Love You"	Mario	5
"Lonely"	Akon	5
"My Love"	Justin Timberlake featuring T.I.	5
"Promiscuous"	Nelly Furtado featuring Timbaland	5
"Pure and Simple"	Hear'Say	5
"So What"	Pink	5
"Swing"	Savage	5
"Tik Tok"	Kesha	5
"We Gon' Ride"	Dei Hamo	5

== See also ==
- New Zealand Top 50 Singles of 2000
- New Zealand Top 50 Singles of 2001
- New Zealand Top 50 Singles of 2002
- New Zealand Top 50 Singles of 2003
- New Zealand Top 50 Singles of 2004
- New Zealand Top 50 Singles of 2005
- New Zealand Top 50 Singles of 2006
- New Zealand Top 50 Singles of 2007
- New Zealand Top 50 Singles of 2008
- New Zealand Top 50 Singles of 2009
- Music of New Zealand
- List of UK Singles Chart number ones of the 2000s
- List of Billboard number-one singles

== Bibliography ==
- Scapolo, Dean (2007). "Introduction". The Complete New Zealand Music Charts: 1966 – 2006. Maurienne House. ISBN 978-1-877443-00-8.
