= List of singer-songwriters =

This is a list of singer-songwriters who write, compose, and perform their own musical material. The list is divided into two sections to differentiate between artists categorized as singer-songwriters and others who do not fall under the definition associated with the genre:

- Traditional singer-songwriters
- Others who both write songs and sing

== Traditional singer-songwriters ==
This list enumerates people who record and perform in the traditional singer-songwriter approach. These performers write their own material, accompany themselves on guitar or keyboards, usually perform solo or with limited and understated accompaniment, and are known as much for their songwriting skills as for their performance abilities.

This list includes both living and deceased singer-songwriters.

=== Argentina ===
- Lisandro Abadie
- Miguel Abuelo
- Carlos Acuña
- Oscar Alemán
- Marcelo Álvarez
- Benjamin Amadeo
- Sandro de América
- Mike Amigorena
- Lisandro Aristimuño
- Federico Aubele
- Axel
- Pedro Aznar
- Juan Carlos Baglietto
- Bahiano
- Abel Balbo
- Adrián Barilari
- Dimi Bass
- Claudio Basso
- Alfredo Belusi
- Daniela Anahi Bessia
- Patricio Borghetti
- Germán Burgos
- Manuel Buzón
- Facundo Cabral
- Jorge Cafrune
- Andrés Calamaro
- Carlos Casella
- Gustavo Cerati
- Tito Climent
- Alberto Cortez
- Jimena Fama
- Dora Gález
- Charly García
- Carlos Gardel
- León Gieco
- Gilda
- Horacio Guarany
- Gloria Guzmán
- Víctor Heredia
- Alejandro Lerner
- Luisana Lopilato
- Valeria Lynch
- Juanita Martínez
- es:Lucas Masciano
- Emilia Mernes
- Sandra Mihanovich
- Amelia Mirel
- Ricardo Mollo
- Lely Morel
- Marcela Morelo
- Adrián Otero
- Fito Páez
- Soledad Pastorutti
- Luciano Pereyra
- Abel Pintos
- Luciana Salazar
- Noel Schajris
- Patricia Sosa
- Luis Alberto Spinetta
- Martina Stoessel
- Tanguito
- Diego Torres
- Bren Vaneske
- María Elena Walsh
- Atahualpa Yupanqui
- Miguel Zavaleta

=== Australia ===
- Peter Allen
- Tina Arena
- Jimmy Barnes
- Sarah Blasko
- Eric Bogle
- Daryl Braithwaite
- Rose Bygrave
- Kev Carmody
- Cletis Carr
- Nick Cave
- Ned Collette
- Ricki-Lee Coulter
- Paul Dempsey
- Johnny Diesel
- Joe Dolce
- Slim Dusty
- Bernard Fanning
- John Farnham
- Bobby Flynn
- Robert Forster
- Tim Freedman
- Corinne Gibbons
- Delta Goodrem
- Darren Hayes
- Missy Higgins
- Jarryd James
- Paul Kelly
- Ben Lee
- Dean Lewis
- Lior
- Alex Lloyd
- Robyn Loau
- Jessica Mauboy
- David McComb
- Chris McCusker
- Hugh McDonald
- Andrea McEwan
- Grant McLennan
- Lisa Miller
- Kate Miller-Heidke
- Tim Minchin
- Lisa Mitchell
- Benjamin Grant Mitchell
- Pete Murray
- Olivia Newton-John
- Kevin Parker
- Paulini
- Josh Pyke
- James Reyne
- Tim Rogers
- Xavier Rudd
- Saritah
- Guy Sebastian
- Mark Seymour
- Sia
- Troye Sivan
- Rob Swire
- Billy Thorpe
- Holly Throsby
- Megan Washington
- Darlene Zschech

=== Austria ===
- Wolfgang Ambros
- Peter Cornelius
- Georg Danzer
- Rainhard Fendrich
- Sissy Handler
- André Heller
- Michael Heltau
- Udo Jürgens
- Anja Plaschg
- Willi Resetarits

=== Barbados ===
- Alison Hinds
- Rupee
- Shontelle

=== Belgium ===
- Sam Bettens
- Jacques Brel
- Ozark Henry
- Lara Fabian
- Flip Kowlier
- Milow
- Selah Sue
- Stromae

=== Bosnia and Hercegovina ===
- Dino Merlin
- Kemal Monteno

=== Brazil ===
- Anitta
- Jorge Ben Jor
- Maria Bethânia
- Fernanda Brum
- Chico Buarque
- Roberto Carlos
- Alice Caymmi
- Fagner
- Ludmila Ferber
- Paula Fernandes
- Gilberto Gil
- João Gilberto
- Antônio Carlos Jobim
- Tom Jobim
- Daniela Mercury
- Vinicius de Moraes
- Ana Nóbrega
- Zé Ramalho
- Angela Ro Ro
- Gabriela Rocha
- Sandra de Sá
- Israel Salazar
- Sandy
- Luan Santana
- Almir Sater
- Nívea Soares
- Juliano Son
- Ana Paula Valadão
- André Valadão
- Mariana Valadão
- Caetano Veloso
- Xuxa

=== Cambodia ===
- Pan Ron
- Ros Serey Sothea
- Sinn Sisamouth

=== Canada ===
==== A–J ====
- Bryan Adams
- Susan Aglukark
- Paul Anka
- Jann Arden
- Tenille Arts
- Tal Bachman
- Jugpreet Singh Bajwa
- Victoria Banks
- Jill Barber
- Daniel Bélanger
- Willie P. Bennett
- Moe Berg
- Art Bergmann
- Justin Bieber
- Bif Naked
- David Bradstreet
- Dean Brody
- Jon Brooks
- Jim Bryson
- Michael Bublé
- Basia Bulat
- Meryn Cadell
- Alessia Cara
- Craig Cardiff
- Andrew Cash
- Alanna Clarke
- Tom Cochrane
- Bruce Cockburn
- Leonard Cohen
- Holly Cole
- Jason Collett
- Stompin' Tom Connors
- J.P. Cormier
- Rose Cousins
- Allison Crowe
- Lori Cullen
- Amelia Curran
- Rick Danko
- Mac Demarco
- Melanie Doane
- Bonnie Dobson
- Fefe Dobson
- Julie Doiron
- Luke Doucet
- Alan Doyle
- Damhnait Doyle
- Drake
- Fred Eaglesmith
- Kathleen Edwards
- Lara Fabian
- Stephen Fearing
- Feist
- Christine Fellows
- Ferron
- Jeremy Fisher
- David Francey
- Nelly Furtado
- Garou
- Joel Gibb
- Ariana Gillis
- Christian Kit Goguen
- Matthew Good
- Sebastien Grainger
- Jenn Grant
- Dallas Green
- Jack Grunsky
- Emm Gryner
- Emily Haines
- Sarah Harmer
- Hayden
- Rob Heath
- Dan Hill
- Veda Hille
- Terry Jacks
- Colin James
- Carly Rae Jepsen
- Steve Jocz
- Brad Johner
- Alexz Johnson
- Sass Jordan

==== K–Z ====
- Connie Kaldor
- James Keelaghan
- Chantal Kreviazuk
- k.d. lang
- Plume Latraverse
- Lisa Lavie
- Avril Lavigne
- Daniel Lavoie
- Félix Leclerc
- Jean Leloup
- Gordon Lightfoot
- Lights
- Old Man Luedecke
- Corb Lund
- Tara MacLean
- Catherine MacLellan
- Dan Mangan
- Richard Manuel
- Amanda Marshall
- Melissa McClelland
- Eileen McGann
- Kate & Anna McGarrigle
- Loreena McKennitt
- Chris McKhool
- Sarah McLachlan
- Holly McNarland
- Shawn Mendes
- Lynn Miles
- Amy Millan
- Joni Mitchell
- Ruth Moody
- Alanis Morissette
- Jess Moskaluke
- Emilie Mover
- Sierra Noble
- Mary Margaret O'Hara
- Maren Ord
- Blair Packham
- Carole Pope
- Powfu
- Jan Randall
- Jimmy Rankin
- Michel Rivard
- Sam Roberts
- Robbie Robertson
- Garnet Rogers
- Stan Rogers
- Louis Royer
- Allison Russell
- Buffy Sainte-Marie
- John K. Samson
- Drew Seeley
- Lorraine Segato
- Jay Semko
- Ron Sexsmith
- Jane Siberry
- R. Dean Taylor
- Tegan and Sara
- Tenille Townes
- Shania Twain
- Ian Tyson
- Sylvia Tyson
- Martha Wainwright
- Rufus Wainwright
- Patrick Watson
- The Weeknd
- David Wiffen
- Hawksley Workman
- Neil Young
- Brigitte Zarie
- Joel Zifkin

=== Chile ===
- Daniela Aleuy
- Beto Cuevas
- Daniel Puente Encina
- Manuel García
- Gepe
- Víctor Jara
- Mon Laferte
- Javiera Mena
- Ángel Parra
- Javiera Parra
- Violeta Parra
- Francisca Valenzuela

=== Colombia ===
- Alci Acosta
- Albalucía Ángel
- Lucas Arnau
- J Balvin
- Blessd
- Naty Botero
- Cabas
- Alex Campos
- Jorge Celedón
- Andrés Cepeda
- ChocQuibTown
- Silvestre Dangond
- Margarita Rosa de Francisco
- Diomedes Díaz
- Alejo Durán
- Andrea Echeverri
- Juan Carlos Echeverry
- Estéfano
- Fonseca
- Karol G
- Darío Gómez
- Marta Gómez
- Leonor Gonzalez Mina
- Ivonne Guzmán
- Illona
- Juanes
- Totó la Momposina
- Carolina la O
- Fanny Lú
- Maía
- Maluma
- Marbelle
- Marce
- Andrés Mercado
- Ericson Alexander Molano
- Jorge Oñate
- Elkin Ramírez
- Valentina Rendón
- Reykon
- Jery Sandoval
- Shakira
- Soraya
- Ali Stone
- Andrés Useche
- Jorge Villamizar
- Iván Villazón
- Carlos Vives
- Charlie Zaa
- Emiliano Zuleta

=== Croatia ===
- Arsen Dedić
- Oliver Dragojević

=== Cuba ===
- Albita
- Giselle Bellas
- Camila Cabello
- Osmani García
- Pablo Milanés
- Silvio Rodríguez

=== Czech Republic ===
- Jaroslav Hutka
- Tomáš Klus
- Karel Kryl
- Vladimír Merta
- Jaromír Nohavica
- Karel Plíhal
- Vlastimil Třešňák
- Xindl X
- Markéta Irglová

=== Denmark ===
- Steffen Brandt
- Tina Dico
- Michael Falch
- Claus Hempler
- Christian Hjelm
- Søren Huss
- C. V. Jørgensen
- Juncker
- Marie Key
- Poul Krebs
- Nanna Lüders Jensen
- Mads Langer
- Kim Larsen
- Lars Lilholt
- Anne Linnet
- Johnny Madsen
- Anne Dorte Michelsen
- Rasmus Nøhr
- Allan Olsen
- Naja Rosa
- Soluna Samay
- Sebastian
- Rasmus Seebach
- Tommy Seebach
- Niels Skousen
- Peter Sommer

=== Dominican Republic ===
- Anaís
- Charytín
- Juan Luis Guerra
- Sandra Zaiter
- Santaye

=== Egypt ===
- Moustafa Amar
- Angham
- Amr Diab
- Mohammad Fouad
- Mohamed Hamaki
- Tamer Hosny
- Amal Maher
- Hani Shaker
- Sherine
- Carmen Suleiman

=== El Salvador ===
- Álvaro Torres

=== Faroe Islands ===
- Eivør
- Guðrið Hansdóttir
- Teitur Lassen

=== Finland ===
- Ismo Alanko
- Chisu
- Jippu
- J. Karjalainen
- Anssi Kela
- Mikko Kuustonen
- Juice Leskinen
- Jarkko Martikainen
- Jonna Tervomaa
- Maija Vilkkumaa

=== France ===
- Dominique A
- Charles Aznavour
- Barbara
- Georges Brassens
- Carla Bruni
- Francis Cabrel
- Camille
- Louis Chedid
- Yves Duteil
- Mylène Farmer
- Jean Ferrat
- Léo Ferré
- Nino Ferrer
- Thomas Fersen
- Serge Gainsbourg
- Jean-Jacques Goldman
- Jacques Higelin
- Alexis HK
- Juliette
- Bernard Lavilliers
- Robert Lelièvre
- Nolwenn Leroy
- Albert Marcœur
- Nina Morato
- Georges Moustaki
- Claude Nougaro
- Pierre Perret
- Michel Polnareff
- Renaud
- Véronique Sanson
- Mano Solo
- Alain Souchon
- Hubert-Félix Thiéfaine
- Boris Vian
- Laurent Voulzy
- Indila
- Willy William

=== Georgia ===
- Katie Melua

=== Germany ===
- Ayọ
- Wolf Biermann
- Clemens Bittlinger
- Clueso
- Funny van Dannen
- Franz Josef Degenhardt
- Kurt Demmler
- Dota
- Siegfried Fietz
- Rob Georg
- Herbert Grönemeyer
- Klaus Hoffmann
- Hanns Dieter Hüsch
- Gisbert zu Knyphausen
- Udo Lindenberg
- Peter Maffay
- Reinhard Mey
- Marius Müller-Westernhagen
- Astrid North
- Markus Rill
- Martin Gotthard Schneider
- Olli Schulz
- Manfred Siebald
- Hannes Wader
- Konstantin Wecker
- Johanna Zeul
- Joana Zimmer

=== Greece ===
- Haris Alexiou
- Andriana Babali
- George Dalaras
- Michalis Hatzigiannis
- Lavrentis Machairitsas
- Vasilis Papakonstantinou
- Demis Roussos

=== Guatemala ===
- Ricardo Arjona
- Gaby Moreno
- Shery

=== Iceland ===
- Ólöf Arnalds
- Ásgeir Trausti
- Björk
- Jónsi
- Lay Low
- Megas
- Emilíana Torrini
- Svavar Knútur
- Jófríður Ákadóttir

=== India ===
- Talat Aziz
- Badshah
- Jugpreet Singh Bajwa
- S. P. Balasubrahmanyam
- Rekha Bhardwaj
- Vishal Bhardwaj
- Dilpreet Bhatia
- Asha Bhonsle
- Sunidhi Chauhan
- Alisha Chinai
- Vishal Dadlani
- Manna Dey
- AP Dhillon
- Zubeen Garg
- Gur Sidhu
- Jassa Dhillon
- Shreya Ghoshal
- Gurinder Gill
- Gippy Grewal
- Hariharan
- Ilaiyaraaja
- Mahalaxmi Iyer
- Neha Kakkar
- Suman Kalyanpur
- Hard Kaur
- Harshdeep Kaur
- Kishor Kumar
- Amrit Maan
- Babbu Maan
- Shankar Mahadevan
- Armaan Malik
- Jass Manak
- Anushka Manchanda
- Lata Mangeshkar
- Talat Mehmood
- Salim Merchant
- Palak Muchhal
- Mukesh
- Udit Narayan
- Sonu Nigam
- Damodar Raao
- Mohammad Rafi
- A. R. Rahman
- Tochi Raina
- Guru Randhawa
- Anirudh Ravichander
- Himesh Reshammiya
- Anupam Roy
- Kumar Sanu
- Shaan
- Arijit Singh
- Honey Singh
- Jagjit Singh
- Sukhwinder Singh
- Kavita Subramaniam
- Pankaj Udhas
- Usha Uthup
- Suresh Wadkar
- Sidhu Moose Wala
- Alka Yagnik
- K. J. Yesudas
- Ajay-Atul
- Sanju Rathod

=== Indonesia ===
- Ebiet G Ade
- Maudy Ayunda
- Iwan Fals
- Fariz RM
- Melly Goeslaw
- Gombloh
- Rhoma Irama
- Harry Roesli
- Sandhy Sondoro
- Yockie Suryoprayogo

=== Iran ===
- Faramarz Aslani
- Mohammad Esfahani
- Shahyar Ghanbari
- Hichkas
- Shahram Nazeri
- Mohammad Reza Shajarian
- Siavash Ghomayshi
- Reza Yazdani
- Mohsen Yeganeh

=== Ireland ===
- Luka Bloom
- Bono
- Paul Brady
- Paddy Casey
- Mic Christopher
- Andrea Corr
- Sharon Corr
- Damien Dempsey
- Janet Devlin
- EDEN
- Mick Flannery
- Dave Flynn
- Mark Geary
- Lisa Hannigan
- Glen Hansard
- Frank Harte
- Gemma Hayes
- Margaret Healy
- Christie Hennessy
- David Hopkins
- Niall Horan
- Hozier
- Andy Irvine
- Katie Kim
- Vyvienne Long
- Phil Lynott
- Shane MacGowan
- James Vincent McMorrow
- Christy Moore
- Van Morrison
- Johnny Moynihan
- Mundy
- Maura O'Connell
- Sinéad O'Connor
- Ted O'Neill
- Declan O'Rourke
- Fionn Regan
- Damien Rice
- Ann Scott
- Chris Singleton
- Andy White

=== Israel ===
- Chava Alberstein
- Meir Ariel
- Shlomo Artzi
- Izhar Ashdot
- Ehud Banai
- David Broza
- Matti Caspi
- Ilan Chester
- Arik Einstein
- Aviv Geffen
- Shlomo Gronich
- Shalom Hanoch
- Achinoam Nini
- Idan Raichel
- Naomi Shemer
- Ariel Zilber

=== Italy ===
- Alice
- Biagio Antonacci
- Claudio Baglioni
- Franco Battiato
- Lucio Battisti
- Edoardo Bennato
- Samuele Bersani
- Andrea Bocelli
- Angelo Branduardi
- Marianna Cataldi
- Adriano Celentano
- Chiara Civello
- Riccardo Cocciante
- Carmen Consoli
- Cesare Cremonini
- Lucio Dalla
- Pino Daniele
- Fabrizio De André
- Francesco De Gregori
- Dolcenera
- Elisa
- Sergio Endrigo
- Gabriella Ferri
- Tiziano Ferro
- Zucchero Fornaciari
- Ivano Fossati
- Giorgio Gaber
- Francesco Guccini
- Jovanotti
- Luciano Ligabue
- Nada
- Gianna Nannini
- Mia Martini
- Domenico Modugno
- Gianni Morandi
- Gino Paoli
- Laura Pausini
- Rita Pavone
- Eros Ramazzotti
- Stefano Righi
- Vasco Rossi
- Luigi Tenco
- Roberto Vecchioni
- Antonello Venditti

=== Jamaica ===
- Alaine
- Buju Banton
- Pato Banton
- Burning Spear
- Jimmy Cliff
- Beres Hammond
- Toots Hibbert
- Barrington Levy
- Bob Marley
- Damian Marley
- Rita Marley
- Skip Marley
- Stephen Marley
- Ziggy Marley
- Sizzla

=== Lebanon ===
- Joseph Attieh
- David M. Bailey
- IJK

=== Lithuania ===
- Vytautas Kernagis

=== Malaysia ===
- Sudirman Arshad
- Zee Avi
- Vince Chong
- M. Nasir
- P. Ramlee
- Shanon Shah
- Pete Teo
- Yuna
- Azmyl Yunor
- Meor Aziddin Yusof
- Alyah

=== Malta ===
- Walter Micallef

=== Mexico ===
- Roberto Cantoral
- Óscar Chávez
- Lolita de la Colina
- Fernando Delgadillo
- Emmanuel
- Rubén Fuentes
- Ana Gabriel
- Juan Gabriel
- María Grever
- Saúl Hernández
- José Alfredo Jiménez
- Natalia Lafourcade
- Agustín Lara
- Armando Manzanero
- Carla Morrison
- Sofía Reyes
- Cuco Sánchez
- Joan Sebastian
- Marco Antonio Solís
- Aleks Syntek
- Lynda Thomas
- Consuelo Velázquez
- Julieta Venegas

=== Moldova ===
- Dan Balan
- Pavel Stratan

=== Netherlands ===
- Stevie Ann
- Frank Boeijen
- Anneke van Giersbergen
- Marike Jager
- Laura Jansen
- Loona
- Lucky Fonz III
- Nielson
- Ntjam Rosie
- Ede Staal
- Jack Jersey
- Guus Meeuwis
- Anouk Teeuwe
- Herman van Veen
- Robert Westerholt

=== New Zealand ===
- Aaradhna
- Megan Alatini
- Daniel Bedingfield
- Carly Binding
- Jackie Clarke
- Ashely Cooper
- Joe Cotton
- Annie Crummer
- Martin Curtis
- Lynette Diaz
- Dave Dobbyn
- Liam Finn
- Neil Finn
- Tim Finn
- Brooke Fraser
- Che Fu
- Rob Guest
- Luke Hurley
- Greg Johnson
- Phil Judd
- David Kilgour
- Nathan King
- Ladyhawke
- Shona Laing
- Lorde
- Ben Lummis
- Jamie McDell
- Fiona McDonald
- Anika Moa
- Howard Morrison
- Tex Morton
- John Rowles
- Bic Runga
- Boh Runga
- Hollie Smith
- Frankie Stevens
- Tiki Taane
- Marcus Turner
- Keith Urban
- Rosita Vai
- Hayley Westenra
- Annie Whittle

=== Nigeria ===
- Asake
- Jahdiel
- Malcolm Guite
- Muma Gee
- Nneka
- Onyeka Onwenu
- Omawumi
- Tiwa Savage

=== Norway ===
- Aurora Aksnes
- Julie Bergan
- Kari Bremnes
- Ane Brun
- Thomas Dybdahl
- Torgunn Flaten
- Magne Furuholmen
- Christine Guldbrandsen
- Morten Harket
- Monica Heldal
- Thom Hell
- William Hut
- Alexandra Joner
- Sissel Kyrkjebø
- Marit Larsen
- Sondre Lerche
- Espen Lind
- Magnet (born Even Johansen)
- Marcus & Martinus
- Lene Marlin
- Maria Mena
- Moddi
- Silje Nergaard
- Lillebjørn Nilsen
- Siri Nilsen
- Janove Ottesen
- Robert Post
- Marion Ravn
- Kari Rueslåtten
- Astrid S
- Iselin Solheim
- Susanne Sundfør
- Paul Waaktaar-Savoy
- Vegard Ylvisåker
- Bertine Zetlitz

=== Panama ===
- Joey Montana

=== Peru ===
- Chabuca Granda
- Gian Marco
- Pedro Suarez Vertiz

=== Philippines ===
- Nilo Alcala
- Ogie Alcasid
- Jose Mari Chan
- Sharon Cuneta
- Glaiza de Castro
- Rodel Naval
- Robin Nievera
- Nityalila
- Rico J. Puno
- Max Surban
- Rey Valera
- Yoyoy Villame

=== Poland ===
- Edyta Bartosiewicz
- Edyta Górniak
- Katy Carr
- Jacek Kaczmarski
- Kasia Moś

=== Portugal ===
- Zeca Afonso
- Leonor Andrade
- Tiago Bettencourt
- David Carreira
- Mickael Carreira
- Fernando Daniel
- Carolina Deslandes
- Sérgio Godinho
- David Fonseca
- Rita Guerra
- Mariza
- Ana Moura
- Adriano Correia de Oliveira
- Jorge Palma
- Diogo Piçarra
- Mia Rose
- José Carlos Ary dos Santos
- Paulo Sousa
- JP Simões
- Raquel Tavares
- Fernando Tordo
- Vitorino
- António Zambujo

=== Puerto Rico ===
- Zayra Alvarez
- Tito Auger
- Puchi Balseiro
- Obie Bermúdez
- Americo Boschetti
- Lou Briel
- Roy Brown
- Antonio Cabán Vale
- Nano Cabrera
- Bobby Capó
- Vicente Carattini
- Santos Colón
- Elvis Crespo
- Tony Croatto
- Bobby Cruz
- Tite Curet Alonso
- Johnathan Dwayne
- Rafi Escudero
- Noel Estrada
- Farruko
- José Feliciano
- Luis Fonsi
- Kany García
- Gustavo Laureano
- Héctor Lavoe
- Ricky Martin
- Yolandita Monge
- Glenn Monroig
- Ednita Nazario
- Noelia
- José Nogueras
- Don Omar
- Angel "Cuco" Peña
- Ignacio Peña
- Carlos Ponce
- Sylvia Rexach
- Julito Rodríguez
- Dräco Rosa
- Zoraida Santiago
- Myrta Silva
- Olga Tañón
- Tommy Torres
- Juan Vélez
- Wilkins Vélez
- Yaire
- Daddy Yankee
- Zeny & Zory

=== Romania ===
- Akcent
- Andreea Banica
- Alexandra Stan
- Antonia Iacobescu
- Inna
- 3 Sud Est
- DJ Project
- Deepcentral
- Delia Matache
- Morandi
- Marius Moga
- Edward Maya
- Lora

=== Russia ===
- Veronika Dolina
- Yanka Dyagileva
- Alexander Gorodnitsky
- Lena Katina
- Eduard Khil
- Andrey Makarevich
- Sergey Nikitin
- Bulat Okudzhava
- Viktor Tsoi
- Yuri Vizbor
- Vladimir Vysotsky

=== Slovakia ===
- Celeste Buckingham
- Marika Gombitová
- Vašo Patejdl
- Dara Rolins
- Dežo Ursiny

=== South Africa ===
- Koos du Plessis
- Jennifer Ferguson
- Anton Goosen
- Sonja Herholdt
- Lira
- Steve Kekana
- Jim Neversink
- Karen Zoid

=== Spain ===
- Manuel Alejandro
- Pablo Alborán
- Luis Eduardo Aute
- María del Mar Bonet
- Miguel Bosé
- Nino Bravo
- Diego El Cigala
- Els Setze Jutges
- Manolo Garcia
- Paco Ibañez
- Enrique Iglesias
- Julio Iglesias
- Lluís Llach
- Victor Manuel
- Roger Mas
- Antonio Orozco
- Tomeu Penya
- José Luis Perales
- Porta
- Raimon
- Joaquín Sabina
- Joan Manuel Serrat
- Camilo Sesto
- Jaume Sisa
- Álex Ubago

=== Sri Lanka ===
- Desmond Kelly
- Nimal Mendis
- Clarence Wijewardena

=== Sweden ===
- PewDiePie
- Joel Berghult
- Basshunter
- Tommy Blom
- Mikael Åkerfeldt
- Fred Åkerström
- Ulla Andersson
- Tomas Andersson Wij
- AronChupa
- Kristofer Åström
- Thomas Di Leva
- Nicolai Dunger
- Marie Fredriksson
- Per Gessle
- José González
- Nanne Grönvall
- Håkan Hellström
- Tommy Karevik
- Christian Kjellvander
- Laleh
- Jens Lekman
- Göran Lagerberg
- Danne Larsson
- Zara Larsson
- Lykke Li
- Lisa Miskovsky
- Linn Berggren
- Stina Nordenstam
- Povel Ramel
- Robyn
- Ilya Salmanzadeh
- Stefan Sundström
- Tallest Man on Earth, The
- Evert Taube
- Joey Tempest
- Isa Tengblad
- Anna Ternheim
- Joakim Thåström
- Cornelis Vreeswijk
- Lars Winnerbäck
- Sophie Zelmani

=== Switzerland ===
- Bastian Baker
- David Buzzi
- Simone Drexel
- Mélanie René

=== United Kingdom ===
==== A–L ====
- Adele
- Lily Allen
- Ian Anderson
- Harvey Andrews
- Gabrielle Aplin
- Lauren Aquilina
- Joan Armatrading
- John Arter
- Rick Astley
- Kevin Ayers
- Gary Barlow
- Syd Barrett
- Rich Batsford
- James Bay
- Peter Bellamy
- Belouis Some
- Matt Bigland
- James Blunt
- David Bowie
- Robbie Boyd
- Mike Batt
- Billy Bragg
- Sarah Brightman
- Andy Brown
- Melanie Brown
- Kate Bush
- Euros Childs
- Melanie C
- Eric Clapton
- Dodie Clark
- Gary Clark
- Lloyd Cole
- JP Cooper
- Jessica Cornish
- Elvis Costello
- Barns Courtney
- Beverley Craven
- Charlotte Gordon Cumming
- Stanley J. Damerell
- Paul Stuart Davies
- Ray Davies
- Alex Day
- Sandy Denny
- Chris de Burgh
- Lynsey de Paul
- Marina Diamandis
- Dido
- Siobhán Donaghy
- Donovan
- Josh Doyle
- Nick Drake
- Duffy
- Ian Dury
- Perrie Edwards
- Emmy the Great
- Ella Eyre
- George Ezra
- Marianne Faithfull
- Newton Faulkner
- Lena Fiagbe
- Kat Flint
- Ryan Fletcher
- Andi Fraggs
- Barry Gibb
- Maurice Gibb
- David Gilmour
- David Gray
- Alistair Griffin
- Malcolm Guite
- Noel Gallagher
- Mick Greenwood
- Peter Hammill
- Albert Hammond
- Ed Harcourt
- Nick Harper
- Roy Harper
- George Harrison
- PJ Harvey
- Justin Hayward
- Matty Healy
- Imogen Heap
- Paul Heaton
- Ella Henderson
- Ant Henson
- Boo Hewerdine
- Robyn Hitchcock
- Trevor Horn
- Ben Howard
- HRVY
- Jamelia
- Mick Jagger
- Bert Jansch
- Sadie Jemmett
- Elton John
- Tom Jones
- Wizz Jones
- Martyn Joseph
- Nik Kershaw
- Wilson T. King
- Beverley Knight
- Steve Knightley
- Charlie Landsborough
- Lemmy
- John Lennon
- Adam Leonard
- Al Lewis
- Leona Lewis
- Cher Lloyd
- John Lodge
- Jez Lowe
- Nick Lowe
- Jeff Lynne

==== M–Z ====
- Ewan MacColl
- Kirsty MacColl
- Amy Macdonald
- Emily Maguire
- Zayn Malik
- Laura Marling
- Johnny Marr
- Michael Marra
- Steve Marriott
- John Martyn
- Brian May
- Conor Maynard
- Paul McCartney
- Shelagh McDonald
- Charlotte McDonnell
- Rory McLeod
- Sarah McQuaid
- Tom McRae
- Ralph McTell
- Mika
- Gary Moore
- James Morrison
- Morrissey
- Freddie Mercury
- Alexi Murdoch
- Graham Nash
- Nina Nesbitt
- Anthony Newley
- John Newman
- Sheila Nicholls
- Heather Nova
- Ivor Novello
- Gilbert O'Sullivan
- Tom Odell
- Beth Orton
- Ozzy Osbourne
- Mark Owen
- Nerina Pallot
- Alex Parks
- Passenger
- Liam Payne
- Precious Pepala
- Mike Pinder
- Leigh-Anne Pinnock
- Karen Poole
- Shelly Poole
- Mal Pope
- Paul Poulton
- Brian Protheroe
- Camille Purcell
- Gerry Rafferty
- Ricky Ross
- Kate Rusby
- Emeli Sandé
- Polly Scattergood
- Jay Sean
- Ed Sheeran
- Labi Siffre
- Lucie Silvas
- Robert Smith
- Sam Smith
- David Sneddon
- Yusuf Islam (formerly Cat Stevens)
- Al Stewart
- Joe Strummer
- Harry Styles
- Dave Swarbrick
- Allan Taylor
- Roger Taylor
- Jade Thirlwall
- Sandi Thom
- Ray Thomas
- Raye
- Richard Thompson
- Teddy Thompson
- Tanita Tikaram
- Steve Tilston
- Louis Tomlinson
- KT Tunstall
- Frank Turner
- Bonnie Tyler
- Bailey Tzuke
- Judie Tzuke
- Karl Wallinger
- Clifford T. Ward
- Shayne Ward
- Roger Waters
- Helen Watson
- Robbie Williams
- Robin Williamson
- Amy Winehouse
- Steve Winwood
- Robert Wyatt
- Pete Wylie
- Sami Yusuf

=== United States ===
==== A–B ====
- David Ackles
- Ryan Adams
- Trace Adkins
- Julien Aklei
- Steve Albini
- Jason Aldean
- Deborah Allen
- Terry Allen
- GG Allin
- Mose Allison
- Gregg Allman
- Peter Alsop
- Tori Amos
- Anastacia
- Eric Anders
- Eric Andersen
- Keith Anderson
- Laurie Anderson
- Theresa Andersson
- Jill Andrews
- Brooke Annibale
- Fiona Apple
- Peter Argyropoulos
- Joseph Arthur
- Ashanti
- Ashe
- Rodney Atkins
- Patti Austin
- Gene Autry
- Hoyt Axton
- Aubrey Ayala
- Dan Avidan
- Steve Azar
- Erykah Badu
- Joan Baez
- David M. Bailey
- Rachel Baiman
- Julien Baker
- Devendra Banhart
- Sara Bareilles
- Geoff Bartley
- Steve Baxter
- David Bazan
- Beck
- Drake Bell
- Rita Bell
- Vince Bell
- Giselle Bellas
- Alec Benjamin
- Dierks Bentley
- Matraca Berg
- Dan Bern
- Beyoncé
- Jim Bianco
- Eric Bibb
- Diane Birch
- Andrew Bird
- Tony Bird
- Alyse Black
- Clint Black
- Frank Black
- Terry Blade
- Janet Blair
- Norman Blake
- David Blue
- Leyla Blue
- Hugh Blumenfeld
- Suzy Bogguss
- Gordon Bok
- Crystal Bowersox
- Ralston Bowles
- Soulja Boy
- Michelle Branch
- Jesse Brand
- Chuck Brodsky
- David Bromberg
- Holly Brook
- Jonatha Brooke
- Garth Brooks
- Chris Brown
- Greg Brown
- Pieta Brown
- Jackson Browne
- Peabo Bryson
- Jeff Buckley
- Tim Buckley
- T-Bone Burnett
- Jonathan Byrd

==== C–D ====
- Colbie Caillat
- J.J. Cale
- Andrew Calhoun
- Terry Callier
- Glen Campbell
- Kate Campbell
- Laura Cantrell
- Mariah Carey
- Brandi Carlile
- Hayes Carll
- Vanessa Carlton
- Craig Carothers
- Sabrina Carpenter
- Mary Chapin Carpenter
- Adam Carroll
- Dee Carstensen
- Dave Carter
- June Carter
- Neko Case
- Peter Case
- Johnny Cash
- Rosanne Cash
- Harry Chapin
- Beth Nielsen Chapman
- Tracy Chapman
- Vic Chesnutt
- Frank Christian
- Lou Christie
- Eric Church
- Ciara
- Annie Clark
- Gene Clark
- Kelly Clarkson
- Guy Clark
- Slaid Cleaves
- Anita Cochran
- Marc Cohn
- Paula Cole
- Judy Collins
- Lui Collins
- Phil Collins
- Shawn Colvin
- Harry Connick Jr.
- Connie Converse
- David Cook
- Sam Cooke
- Alice Cooper
- Chris Cornell
- Matt Costa
- Elizabeth Cotten
- Ingrid Croce
- Charley Crockett
- Jim Croce
- Dash Crofts
- David Crosby
- Christopher Cross
- Mike Cross
- Sheryl Crow
- Rodney Crowell
- Bobbie Cryner
- Catie Curtis
- Chelsea Cutler
- Billy Ray Cyrus
- Miley Cyrus
- Noah Cyrus
- Vernon Dalhart
- Sean Danielsen
- Glenn Danzig
- John Darnielle
- Sophia Dashing
- Gail Davies
- Kimya Dawson
- Grey DeLisle
- Kris Delmhorst
- Lana Del Rey
- Rebekah Del Rio
- Iris DeMent
- Jason Derulo
- John Denver
- Neil Diamond
- Ani DiFranco
- Maria D'Luz
- John Doe
- Mike Doughty
- Gregory Douglass
- Connie Dover
- The-Dream
- Marshall Drew
- DW (Dave) Drouillard
- Bob Dylan
- Jakob Dylan

==== E–G ====
- Kate Earl
- Stacey Earle
- Justin Townes Earle
- Steve Earle
- Kenneth "Babyface" Edmonds
- Jonathan Edwards
- Ana Egge
- Billie Eilish
- Mark Erelli
- Alejandro Escovedo
- Carmen Espinoza-Rodriquez
- Melissa Etheridge
- Richard Fariña
- Sierra Ferrell
- Melissa Ferrick
- Roberta Flack
- Dan Fogelberg
- John Fogerty
- Ben Folds
- Blaze Foley
- Keith Follesé
- Steve Forbert
- Jon Foreman
- Ruthie Foster
- Jeffrey Foucault
- Michael Fracasso
- Black Francis
- Jackson C. Frank
- Bob Franke
- Carole Fredericks
- Glenn Frey
- Dean Friedman
- Lefty Frizzell
- Lady Gaga
- Noel Gallagher
- Annie Gallup
- Timothy Garon
- Mary Gauthier
- Marvin Gaye
- Teddy Geiger
- Natalie Gelman
- Billy Gibbons
- Daughn Gibson
- Vance Gilbert
- Vince Gill
- Jimmie Dale Gilmore
- Dominique Gizelle
- Lotti Golden
- Gabrielle Goodman
- Steve Goodman
- Lesley Gore
- John Gorka
- Nick Granato
- Jackie Greene
- Patty Griffin
- Nanci Griffith
- Jenn Grinels
- Arlo Guthrie
- Sarah Lee Guthrie
- Woody Guthrie
- Gwendolyn

==== H–J ====
- Merle Haggard
- Sammy Hagar
- Tom T. Hall
- Halsey
- Arin Hanson
- Kristy Hanson
- Tim Hardin
- Jack Hardy
- Ben Harper
- Ciara Harris
- Emmylou Harris
- Jesse Harris
- Debbie Harry
- Beth Hart
- John Hartford
- Juliana Hatfield
- Richie Havens
- Ted Hawkins
- Hunter Hayes
- Amy Helm
- Jimi Hendrix
- Terri Hendrix
- Don Henley
- Caroline Herring
- Ari Hest
- James Hetfield
- John Hiatt
- Sara Hickman
- Lauryn Hill
- Chris Hillman
- Anne Hills
- Keri Hilson
- Tyler Hilton
- Tish Hinojosa
- Will Hoge
- Malcolm Holcombe
- J. Holiday
- Cisco Houston
- Bob Howard
- Grayson Hugh
- Tim Hughes
- Sierra Hull
- Meg Hutchinson
- Walter Hyatt
- Janis Ian
- India.Arie
- James Ingram
- David Ippolito
- Allison Iraheta
- Iron & Wine
- Chris Isaak
- Gregory Alan Isakov
- Bon Iver
- Carl Jackson
- Janet Jackson
- Jermaine Jackson
- Michael Jackson
- Avi Jacob
- Nicky Jam
- Brendan James
- Sarah Jarosz
- Jaymay
- Nikki Jean
- Stephan Jenkins
- Mason Jennings
- Waylon Jennings
- Molly Jenson
- Justin Jesso
- Jewel
- Eilen Jewell
- Kari Jobe
- Billy Joel
- Jack Johnson
- Jamey Johnson
- Freedy Johnston
- Joshua Scott Jones
- Norah Jones
- Sharon Jones
- Montell Jordan
- Tyler Joseph
- Jon Bon Jovi
- Simon Joyner
- Gary Jules

==== K–L ====
- Si Kahn
- Kieran Kane
- Lucy Kaplansky
- Kashif
- Mat Kearney
- Robert Earl Keen
- Marianne Keith
- Toby Keith
- Kelis
- Malcolm David Kelley
- Ruston Kelly
- R. Kelly
- Tori Kelly
- Alicia Keys
- Monica Kim
- Carole King
- Charles E. King
- Claude King
- Elle King
- Terry Kirkman
- Sonya Kitchell
- Charles Michael Kittridge
- Hayley Kiyoko
- "Spider" John Koerner
- Matthew Koma
- Nikhil Korula
- Mark Kozelek
- Alison Krauss
- Lenny Kravitz
- Kris Kristofferson
- Ben Kweller
- Jimmy LaFave
- Miranda Lambert
- Ray LaMontagne
- Justin Lanning
- Patty Larkin
- Jim Lauderdale
- Lauv
- Christine Lavin
- Scott Law
- Lead Belly
- Jasper Leach
- Amos Lee
- Amy Lee
- Tom Lehrer
- Bethany Joy Lenz
- David Levin
- Hannah Lew
- Blake Lewis
- Bob Lind
- Lazer Lloyd
- Lisa Loeb
- Kenny Loggins
- Lindsay Lou
- Demi Lovato
- Laura Love
- Karen Lovely
- Lyle Lovett
- Lera Lynn
- Loretta Lynn

==== M–N ====
- Rod MacDonald
- Dougie MacLean
- Bill Madden
- Madeline the Person
- Martie Maguire
- Taj Mahal
- Sananda Maitreya
- David Mallett
- Michelle Malone
- Melissa Manchester
- Barry Manilow
- Barry Mann
- AmberRose Marie
- Teena Marie
- Bruno Mars
- Bob Martin
- Melanie Martinez
- Richard Marx
- Dana Mase
- Michael Masser
- Kathy Mattea
- Nanette Maxine
- Heather Maxwell
- John Mayer
- Curtis Mayfield
- Parker McCollum
- Jennette McCurdy
- Country Joe McDonald
- Reba McEntire
- Tim McGraw
- Roger McGuinn
- Nellie McKay
- Bonnie McKee
- Lori McKenna
- Erin McKeown
- Rod McKuen
- Don McLean
- James McMurtry
- Melanie
- John Mellencamp
- Colin Meloy
- Bridgit Mendler
- Idina Menzel
- Natalie Merchant
- Michael J. Merenda, Jr.
- Tift Merritt
- Pia Mia
- Julia Michaels
- Ingrid Michaelson
- Bea Miller
- Julie Miller
- Lin-Manuel Miranda
- Jim Messina
- Anaïs Mitchell
- Keb' Mo'
- Moby
- Tony Molina
- Janelle Monáe
- Ben Moody
- Mandy Moore
- Allison Moorer
- Gurf Morlix
- Bill Morrissey
- Jason Mraz
- Shawn Mullins
- Peter Mulvey
- Michael Martin Murphey
- Jimmy Murphy
- Kacey Musgraves
- Anna Nalick
- Graham Nash
- Leigh Nash
- Nina Nastasia
- Matt Nathanson
- Holly Near
- Fred Neil
- Lukas Nelson
- Ricky Nelson
- Willie Nelson
- Jennifer Nettles
- Mickey Newbury
- Carrie Newcomer
- Randy Newman
- Joanna Newsom
- Stevie Nicks
- Britt Nicole
- Willie Nile
- Harry Nilsson
- Keri Noble
- Noname
- The Notorious B.I.G.
- Bradley Nowell
- Ted Nugent
- Laura Nyro

==== O–R ====
- Conor Oberst
- Olivia O'Brien
- Tim O'Brien
- Phil Ochs
- Finneas O'Connell
- Aoife O'Donovan
- Will Oldham
- Tony Oller
- David Olney
- Joan Osborne
- Johnny Otis
- Faith Page
- Jim Page
- Brad Paisley
- Dolly Parton
- Ellis Paul
- Tom Paxton
- Johnny Paycheck
- Herb Pedersen
- Sarah Pedinotti
- Yolanda Pérez
- Katy Perry
- Pierce Pettis
- Tom Petty
- Madeleine Peyroux
- Liz Phair
- Kelly Joe Phelps
- Grant-Lee Phillips
- Sam Phillips
- Shawn Phillips
- Utah Phillips
- Rod Picott
- Pitbull
- Gene Pitney
- Doc Pomus
- Cassadee Pope
- Catherine Porter
- Willy Porter
- Mike Posner
- Grace Potter
- Elvis Presley
- Tristan Prettyman
- Dory Previn
- Margo Price
- Toni Price
- Prince
- John Prine
- Chuck Prophet
- Charlie Puth
- Top Quality
- Joshua Radin
- Bonnie Raitt
- India Ramey
- Tony Ramey
- Larry Ramos
- Willis Alan Ramsey
- Carmino Ravosa
- Otis Redding
- Ann Reed
- Lou Reed
- Bebe Rexha
- Trent Reznor
- Kim Richey
- Jonathan Richman
- Amy Rigby
- Rihanna
- Josh Ritter
- JT Roach
- Carson Robison
- Zack de la Rocha
- Lucy Wainwright Roche
- Jimmie Rodgers
- Olivia Rodrigo
- Sixto Rodriguez
- Henry Rollins
- Dräco Rosa
- Raina Rose
- Emmy Rossum
- Josh Rouse
- David Rovics
- Peter Rowan
- Darius Rucker
- Todd Rundgren
- Tom Rush
- Tom Russell

==== S–T ====
- Rachael Sage
- Doug Sahm
- Richie Sambora
- Martha Scanlan
- Marc Scibilia
- Darrell Scott
- Dan Seals
- Jim Seals
- John Sebastian
- Pebe Sebert
- Neil Sedaka
- Pete Seeger
- Martin Sexton
- Tupac Shakur
- Maia Sharp
- Billy Joe Shaver
- Tommy Shaw
- Jules Shear
- Duncan Sheik
- Blake Shelton
- Vonda Shepard
- Richard Shindell
- Amanda Shires
- Michelle Shocked
- Paul Siebel
- Judee Sill
- Gene Simmons
- Carly Simon
- Paul Simon
- Nina Simone
- Matt Simons
- Sisqó
- Ricky Skaggs
- Patrick Sky
- Megan Slankard
- P. F. Sloan
- Sasha Alex Sloan
- Darden Smith
- Elliott Smith
- Michael Smith
- Patti Smith
- Willow Smith
- Chris Smither
- Todd Snider
- Phoebe Snow
- Jill Sobule
- Ben Sollee
- Trey Songz
- Jo-El Sonnier
- Soraya
- Regina Spektor
- Bruce Springsteen
- Aaron Sprinkle
- Bill Staines
- Chris Stapleton
- David Steinhart
- Colin Stetson
- Sufjan Stevens
- John Stewart
- Wynn Stewart
- Stephen Stills
- Maria Straub
- Billy Strings
- Marty Stuart
- Patrick Stump
- Alison Sudol
- Gene Summers
- Patrick Swayze
- Taylor Swift
- Raven-Symoné
- SZA
- Corey Taylor
- Eric Taylor
- James Taylor
- Livingston Taylor
- Louise Taylor
- Ryan Tedder
- Jack Tempchin
- Chloe Temtchine
- Vienna Teng
- Robin Thicke
- Chris Thile
- Bryson Tiller
- Justin Timberlake
- Rob Thomas
- Chris Tomlin
- Meghan Trainor
- Alex Turner
- Molly Tuttle
- Shania Twain
- Steven Tyler

==== U–Z ====
- Usher Raymond
- Grace VanderWaal
- Guy Van Duser
- Dave Van Ronk
- Townes Van Zandt
- Phil Vassar
- Vassy
- Stoll Vaughan
- Eddie Vedder
- Suzanne Vega
- Laura Veirs
- Justin Vernon
- John Vesely
- Jack Vidgen
- Rhonda Vincent
- Eric Von Schmidt
- Rocky Votolato
- Loudon Wainwright III
- Sloan Wainwright
- Tom Waits
- Butch Walker
- Jerry Jeff Walker
- Summer Walker
- M. Ward
- Linda Waterfall
- Sara Watkins
- Doc Watson
- Willie Watson
- Lil Wayne
- Gillian Welch
- Kevin Welch
- Susan Werner
- Matt Wertz
- Tierra Whack
- Cheryl Wheeler
- Erica Wheeler
- Brooke White
- Jack White
- Josh White
- Maurice White
- Chris Whitley
- David Wilcox
- Brooks Williams
- Dar Williams
- Don Williams
- Geoffrey Williams
- Hank Williams
- Hank Williams Jr.
- Keller Williams
- Lucinda Williams
- Pharrell Williams
- Victoria Williams
- Cris Williamson
- Gretchen Wilson
- Jesse Winchester
- Cody Wise
- Bill Withers
- Denison Witmer
- Jim Wolf
- Kate Wolf
- Bobby Womack
- Bill Wurtz
- Juliet Wyers
- Rachael Yamagata
- Jim Yester
- Dwight Yoakam
- Jesse Colin Young
- Neil Young
- Steve Young
- Robin Zander
- Frank Zappa
- Mirah Yom Tov Zeitlyn
- Steven Zelin
- Warren Zevon
- Jeremy Zucker
- Natalia Zukerman

=== Venezuela ===
- Mirla Castellanos
- Ilan Chester
- Guillermo Dávila
- Ricardo Montaner
- Jose Luis Rodriguez
- Aldemaro Romero
- Franco De Vita

== Others who both write songs and sing ==
Following are performers who are not singer-songwriters in the traditional sense, but who both write and perform songs in other genres. This includes artists known more prominently as members of bands and not primarily as soloists.

=== Australia ===
- Tina Arena
- Sia
- Iggy Azalea
- John Butler
- Kasey Chambers
- Michael Hutchence
- Daniel Johns
- Jessica Mauboy
- Anne McCue
- Kylie Minogue
- Bon Scott
- Guy Sebastian
- Cody Simpson
- Rob Swire
- Angus and Julia Stone

=== Bosnia And Herzegovina ===
- Dino Merlin

=== Canada ===
- Bryan Adams
- Melissa Auf der Maur
- Justin Bieber
- Matthew Good
- Alexz Johnson
- Daniel Lanois
- James LaBrie
- Geddy Lee
- Gordon Lightfoot
- Lanie Banks
- Shawn Mendes
- Alanis Morissette
- Alannah Myles
- Carl Newman
- Aldo Nova
- Robbie Robertson
- Buffy Sainte-Marie
- Skye Sweetnam
- David Usher
- Neil Young
- Alessia Cara

=== Chile ===
- Tom Araya

=== Croatia ===
- Darko Rundek
- Zlatan Stipišić Gibonni
- Branimir Štulić

=== China ===
- Zhang Yixing

=== Denmark ===
- Alberte
- Sys Bjerre
- Maggie Björklund
- Burhan G
- Erika de Casier
- Tim Christensen
- Coco O.
- Anna David
- Dicte
- Aura Dione
- Fallulah
- Lukas Forchhammer
- Emmelie de Forest
- Troels Gustavsen
- Hugo Helmig
- Thomas Helmig
- Caroline Henderson
- Hjalmar
- Thomas Holm
- Lars H.U.G.
- Karen Jønsson
- King Diamond
- Jeppe Laursen
- Sebastian Lind
- Kwamie Liv
- Simon Kvamm
- Medina
- Joey Moe
- Myrkur
- MØ
- Oh Land
- Agnes Obel
- Jascha Richter
- Pernille Rosendahl
- Natasja Saad
- Søren Sko
- Kira Skov
- Mike Tramp
- Sune Rose Wagner
- Rasmus Walter
- Tue West
- Karl William
- Xander

=== Finland ===
- Jouni Hynynen
- Jyrki 69
- Andy McCoy
- Timo Rautiainen
- Gösta Sundqvist
- Timo Tolkki
- Ville Valo
- Toni Wirtanen
- Lauri Ylonen

=== France ===
- Bernard Bonvoisin
- Étienne Daho
- Zazie

=== Germany ===
- Udo Dirkschneider
- Max Koffler
- Klaus Meine

=== Hong Kong ===
- George Lam

=== Iceland ===
- Bjork

=== India ===
- Babbu Maan
- A. R. Rahman

=== Ireland ===
- Bono
- Enya
- Órla Fallon
- Lynn Hilary
- Niall Horan

=== Italy ===
- Stefano Righi
- Zucchero

=== Japan ===
- Aimer
- Mao Abe
- Aiko
- Angela Aki
- Yūko Andō
- Chara
- Cocco
- CooRie
- Joe Inoue
- Kurumi Enomoto
- Masaharu Fukuyama
- Gackt
- Ayumi Hamasaki
- Motohiro Hata
- Megumi Hinata
- Ken Hirai
- Mayumi Horikawa
- Hyde
- Leo Ieiri
- Mari Iijima
- Koshi Inaba
- Yōsui Inoue
- Shigeru Izumiya
- Yoohei Kawakami
- Ai Kawashima
- Hiroshi Kitadani
- Kokia
- Kotringo
- Koda Kumi
- Mai Kuraki
- Keisuke Kuwata
- Masato Hayakawa
- Olivia Lufkin
- Noriyuki Makihara
- Yumi Matsutoya
- Miwa
- Yui Mizuno
- Showtaro Morikubo
- Miyuki Nakajima
- Yuto Nakajima
- Uri Nakayama
- Haru Nemuri
- Sakurako Ohara
- Tamio Okuda
- Chihiro Onitsuka
- Ai Otsuka
- Yuki Saito
- Maaya Sakamoto
- Jun Shibata
- Ringo Shiina
- Akiko Shikata
- SoulJa
- Shikao Suga
- Yuya Takaki
- Yukihide Takekawa
- Mariya Takeuchi
- Nacomi Tanaka
- Hikaru Utada
- Hitomi Yaida
- Etsuko Yakushimaru
- Maria Yamamoto
- Tatsuro Yamashita
- Akiko Yano
- Takuro Yoshida
- Yui

=== Malaysia ===
- Yuna

=== New Zealand ===
- Liam Finn
- Neil Finn
- Tim Finn
- Lorde
- Jamie McDell
- Bic Runga
- Hollie Smith
- Stan Walker
- Hayley Westenra

=== Nigeria ===
- Muma Gee
- Niyola
- Waje

=== Pakistan ===
- Ali Baba Khan
- Bilal Saeed
- Salman Ahmad
- Ali Azmat
- Zeek Afridi
- Humaira Arshad
- Nadia Ali
- Atif Aslam
- Iqbal Bano
- Sara Haider
- Komal Rizvi
- Haroon
- Mehdi Hassan
- Ahmed Jahanzeb
- Ustad Nusrat Fateh Ali Khan
- Ali Zafar

=== Philippines ===
- Dong Abay
- Freddie Aguilar
- Ogie Alcasid
- Cynthia Alexander
- Barbie Almalbis
- Joey Ayala
- Christian Bautista
- Rico Blanco
- Ely Buendia
- Jose Mari Chan
- Charice (Jake Zyrus)
- Yeng Constantino
- Billy Joe Crawford
- Sharon Cuneta
- Jay Durias
- Eraserheads
- Pops Fernandez
- Sarah Geronimo
- Janno Gibbs
- Rachelle Ann Go
- Kyla
- Bamboo Mañalac
- Maine Mendoza
- Chito Miranda
- Morissette
- Kitchie Nadal
- Martin Nievera
- Nina
- Kylie Padilla
- Gary Valenciano
- Princess Velasco
- Regine Velasquez
- Yael Yuzon

=== Romania ===
- Alexandra Stan

=== Serbia ===
- Momčilo Bajagić
- Đorđe Balašević
- Zvonko Bogdan
- Dejan Cukić
- Nikola Čuturilo
- Vlada Divljan
- Bebi Dol
- Bora Đorđević
- Zvonimir Đukić Đule
- Bane Krstić
- Kiki Lesendrić
- Srđan Marjanović
- Slađana Milošević
- Milan Mladenović
- Ljuba Ninković
- Madame Piano
- Ana Popović
- Toma Zdravković
- Predrag Živković Tozovac

=== Singapore ===
- Tanya Chua
- JJ Lin
- Stefanie Sun

=== South Africa ===
- Cristina Boshoff
- Don Clarke
- Johnny Clegg
- Anton Goosen
- David Kramer
- Shekhinah (singer)
- Tellaman
- Karen Zoid

=== South Korea ===
- Ailee
- Bang Yongguk
- BoA
- Cho Yong-pil
- Im Chang-jung
- Jun Jinyoung
- Jung Yonghwa
- Kang Seungyoon
- Bang Chan
- Kangta
- Kim C
- Kim Dong-ryool
- Moon Hee-jun
- Kim Jong-seo
- Kim Kwang-Seok
- Kim Jaejoong
- Kim Junsu
- Kim Sa-rang
- Lee Jonghyun
- Lee Juck
- MC Sniper
- The One
- Park Hyo-shin
- Rain
- Seo Taiji
- Shin Hae Chul
- Shin Seung Hun
- Tablo
- Wheesung
- Park Ye-eun
- Yoon Jong-shin
- Yoo Hee-Yeol
- RM (musician)
- Jin
- Suga
- J-Hope
- Jimin
- V
- Jungkook
- G-Dragon
- T.O.P
- Young K
- Jae Park
- JB (South Korean Singer)
- B.I (rapper)
- Bobby (rapper)
- Zico (rapper)
- Jeon So-yeon
- Hui (singer)
- Bumzu
- Kang Seung-yoon
- Mino (rapper)
- Park Kyung
- LE (rapper)
- Chaeyoung
- Elkie Chong
- Lee Tae-yong
- Mark (rapper)
- Na Jaemin
- Onew
- Kim Jong-hyun
- Key (entertainer)
- Choi Min-ho
- Lee Tae-min
- Joohoney
- Wonho (singer)
- Solar (singer)
- Moonbyul
- Wheein
- Hwasa
- Chungha
- Park Jin-young
- Jessi (musician)
- Psy
- IU (entertainer)
- Eric Nam
- Chanyeol
- Suho
- Baekhyun
- Chen (singer)
- Sehun (singer)
- Ok Taec-yeon
- Jun. K
- Jang Wooyoung
- Nichkhun
- Lee Jun-ho
- Hwang Chan-sung
- Amber Liu (singer)
- Dami Im
- Hyuna
- Henry Lau

=== Sweden ===
- Agnetha Fältskog
- Caroline Hjelt
- Aino Jawo
- Tove Lo

=== Taiwan ===
- Chang Yu-sheng
- Chang Chen-yue
- Lala Hsu
- Eve Ai
- Enno Cheng
- Cheer Chen
- David Tao
- Evan Yo
- A-Lin
- Jay Chou
- Kenji Wu
- Deserts Chang
- Chih Siou
- Ella Chen
- Hebe Tien
- Selina Jen
- Leehom Wang
- Jolin Tsai
- Crowd Lu
- Tank
- Will Pan
- Wu Tsing-fong
- MC HotDog
- Yoga Lin
- Vivian Hsu
- Sun Sheng Xi
- Lo Ta-yu
- Phil Chang
- Ashin
- OSN
- Gary Chaw
- ØZI
- Nick Chou
- Eric Chou

=== Turkey ===
- Sezen Aksu
- Mazhar Alanson
- Kenan Doğulu
- Orhan Gencebay
- İlhan İrem
- Kayahan
- Barış Manço
- Bülent Ortaçgil
- Nazan Öncel
- Münir Nurettin Selçuk
- Tarkan
- Yıldız Tilbe

=== Ukraine ===
- Natalie Gioia

=== United Kingdom ===
==== A–L ====
- Sade Adu
- Damon Albarn
- Marc Almond
- Ian Anderson
- Jon Anderson
- Badly Drawn Boy (Damon Gough)
- Gary Barlow
- Syd Barrett
- Julian Barry
- Blaze Bayley
- Natasha Bedingfield
- Nick Beggs
- Adrian Belew
- Amelle Berrabah
- James Blunt
- Betty Boo
- David Bowie
- Sarah Brightman
- Keisha Buchanan
- Mutya Buena
- Jake Bugg
- Kate Bush
- Biff Byford
- Katy Carr
- Eric Clapton
- Phil Collins
- Tulisa Contostavlos
- Elvis Costello
- David Coverdale
- Charli XCX
- Charlotte Gordon Cumming
- Dappy
- Ray Davies
- Cathy Dennis
- Marina Lambrini Diamandis
- Paul Di'Anno
- Bruce Dickinson
- Pete Doherty
- Donovan
- Stephen Duffy
- Joe Elliott
- Geoff Everett
- Marianne Faithfull
- Peter Gabriel
- Liam Gallagher
- Noel Gallagher
- Barry Gibb
- Maurice Gibb
- Robin Gibb
- Ian Gillan
- David Gilmour
- Gary Glitter
- Ellie Goulding
- David Gray
- Gregory Gray
- Matt Hales
- Rob Halford
- Pete Ham
- Peter Hammill
- Calvin Harris
- George Harrison
- Justin Hawkins
- Justin Hayward
- Imogen Heap
- Mick Hucknall
- Ian Hunter
- Jessie J
- Joe Jackson
- Mick Jagger
- Jem
- Elton John
- Brian Johnson
- Matt Johnson
- Mick Jones
- Nik Kershaw
- Jim King
- David Knopfler
- Mark Knopfler
- Greg Lake
- Simon Le Bon
- Lemmy
- John Lennon
- Leona Lewis
- Gary Lightbody
- Limahl
- Dua Lipa
- Cher Lloyd
- Nick Lowe
- Jeff Lynne

==== M–Z ====
- Paddy McAloon
- Paul McCartney
- Christine McVie
- Shirley Manson
- Zayn Malik
- Steve Marriott
- Brian May
- Freddie Mercury
- George Michael
- Morrissey
- Kate Nash
- Simon Neil
- John Newman
- Jim Noir
- Richard O'Brien
- Rita Ora
- John Otway
- Bill Owen
- Mark Owen
- Ozzy Osbourne
- John Payne
- Liam Payne
- Robert Plant
- Plunkett
- Jon Poole
- Heidi Range
- Keith Relf
- Tim Rice
- Keith Richards
- Gavin Rossdale
- Graham Russell
- Emeli Sandé
- Sam Smith
- Tim Smith
- Ringo Starr
- Al Stewart
- Rod Stewart
- Sting
- Joss Stone
- Joe Strummer
- Harry Styles
- Jeremy Taylor
- Roger Taylor
- David Tibet
- Louis Tomlinson
- Alex Turner
- Tom Vek
- Roger Waters
- Florence Welch
- Paul Weller
- John Wetton
- Kim Wilde
- Roy Wood
- Richard Wright
- Thom Yorke
- Will Young

=== United States ===
==== A–E ====
- 50 Cent
- Ryan Adams
- Christina Aguilera
- Priscilla Ahn
- Ray Alder
- Nadia Ali
- Gregg Allman
- Dave Alvin
- Trey Anastasio
- Ken Andrews
- Michael Andrews
- Fiona Apple
- John Arch
- David Archuleta
- Billie Joe Armstrong
- Louis Armstrong
- Dan Auerbach
- Gene Autry
- Francesca Battistelli
- Beck
- Walter Becker
- Joey Belladonna
- Chuck Berry
- Dickey Betts
- Beyoncé
- Larry Blackmon
- Karl Blau
- Michael Bolton
- Jon Bon Jovi
- Olivia Bonilla
- Ralston Bowles
- Brandon Boyd
- Phoebe Bridgers
- Garth Brooks
- Jackson Browne
- Peabo Bryson
- Lindsey Buckingham
- Benjamin Burnley
- Glen Burtnik
- John Bush
- Paul Butterfield
- Sarah Buxton
- David Byrne
- Ryan Cabrera
- Jerry Cantrell
- Mariah Carey
- Eric Carmen
- Chris Carrabba
- Peter Cetera
- Bill Champlin
- Tracy Chapman
- Cher
- Gary Cherone
- Peter Cincotti
- Guy Clark
- Kelly Clarkson
- Roger Clyne
- Kurt Cobain
- Fred Cole
- Lisa Coleman
- Billy Corgan
- Chris Cornell
- Jonathan Coulton
- Dash Crofts
- Robert Cray
- Peter Criss
- Kevin Cronin
- David Crosby
- Sheryl Crow
- Rivers Cuomo
- John Curulewski
- Miley Cyrus
- Terence Trent D'Arby
- Jonathan Davis
- Howie Day
- Tom DeLonge
- John Denver
- Dennis DeYoung
- Neil Diamond
- Bo Diddley
- Ronnie James Dio
- Dion DiMucci
- Willie Dixon
- Don Dokken
- David Draiman
- Haylie Duff
- Hilary Duff
- Sean Duffy
- Fred Durst
- Bob Dylan
- Jakob Dylan
- Danny Elfman
- Eminem
- Ace Enders
- Mark Erelli
- Gloria Estefan

==== F–K ====
- Donald Fagen
- Don Felder
- Fergie
- William Fitzsimmons
- John Flansburgh
- Brandon Flowers
- John Fogerty
- Dan Fogleberg
- Ben Folds
- Ace Frehley
- Glenn Frey
- John Frusciante
- Vic Fuentes
- Becky G
- Lady Gaga
- David Gates
- Gloria Gaynor
- Barry Gibb
- Maurice Gibb
- Robin Gibb
- Benjamin Gibbard
- Billy Gibbons
- Eliza Gilkyson
- Selena Gomez
- Ariana Grande
- Hank Green
- Jeremy Gregory
- Christina Grimmie
- Dave Grohl
- Buddy Guy
- Sammy Hagar
- Daryl Hall
- Jessica Harp
- Ben Harper
- Mary Harris
- Deborah Harry
- Dan Hartman
- Sophie B. Hawkins
- Angel Haze
- Mark Heard
- Levon Helm
- Logan Henderson
- Jimi Hendrix
- Don Henley
- James Hetfield
- John Hiatt
- Malcolm Holcombe
- Buddy Holly
- Mark Hoppus
- Robert Hunter
- James Ingram
- Alan Jackson
- Janet Jackson
- Michael Jackson
- Jay-Z
- Stephan Jenkins
- Tiff Jimber
- Robert Johnson
- JoJo
- Joe Jonas
- Kevin Jonas
- Nick Jonas
- Rickie Lee Jones
- Janis Joplin
- Tyler Joseph
- Maynard James Keenan
- R. Kelly
- Mean Gene Kelton
- Eddie Kendricks
- Kenna
- Doug Kershaw
- Kesha
- Alicia Keys
- Thurane Aung Khin
- Anthony Kiedis
- Bobby Kimball
- B.B. King
- Carole King
- Terry Kirkman

==== L–N ====
- Adam Lambert
- Ray LaMontagne
- Mark Lanegan
- Cyndi Lauper
- Bernie Leadon
- Bethany Joy Lenz
- Jared Leto
- Adam Levine
- Aaron Lewis
- Philip Lindholm
- John Linnell
- Lisa Loeb
- Kenny Loggins
- Lindsay Lohan
- Joe Lopez
- Demi Lovato
- Courtney Love
- Lyle Lovett
- Ross Lynch
- Loretta Lynn
- Benji Madden
- Joel Madden
- Madonna
- Kaitlyn Maher
- Jeff Mangum
- Aimee Mann
- Marilyn Manson
- Marce
- Anthony Marinelli
- Chan Marshall
- Richard Marx
- James Maslow
- Dave Matthews
- John Mayer
- Edwin McCain
- Jesse McCartney
- Michael McDonald
- Jon McLaughlin
- Katharine McPhee
- Travis Meeks
- Randy Meisner
- John Mellencamp
- Wendy Melvoin
- Natalie Merchant
- Stephin Merritt
- AJ Michalka
- Aly Michalka
- Rhett Miller
- Roger Miller
- Steve Miller
- Nicki Minaj
- Freddy Moore
- Jim Morrison
- Chuck Mosley
- Elliott Murphy
- Dave Mustaine
- Frank J. Myers
- Faheem Najm
- Nelly
- Dan Nelson
- Michael Nesmith
- Mike Ness
- Randy Newman
- Ne-Yo
- Stevie Nicks
- Keri Noble
- The Notorious B.I.G.
- Justin Nozuka
- Ted Nugent

==== O–Z ====
- John Oates
- Ric Ocasek
- Roy Orbison
- Joan Osborne
- Buck Owens
- David Paich
- Mike Patton
- Carlos Pena, Jr.
- CeCe Peniston
- Christina Perri
- Katy Perry
- Linda Perry
- Steve Perry
- Tom Petty
- Glen Phillips
- Pink (Alecia Beth Moore-Hart)
- Dave Pirner
- Rachel Platten
- Jimmy Pop
- John Popper
- Poppy
- Grace Potter
- Prince
- John Prine
- Chuck Prophet
- Eddie Rabbitt
- Rakim
- Twiggy Ramirez
- Larry Ramos
- Redfoo
- Haley Reinhart
- Bebe Rexha
- Trent Reznor
- Lionel Richie
- Johnny Rivers
- Smokey Robinson
- Zack de la Rocha
- Sixto Rodriguez
- Gamble Rogers
- Kenny Rogers
- Ed Roland
- Axl Rose
- David Lee Roth
- Todd Rundgren
- Leon Russell
- John Rzeznik
- Kendall Schmidt
- Timothy B. Schmit
- Big Sean
- Drew Seeley
- Bob Seger
- Selena
- Adam Selzer
- Tommy Shaw
- Adam Shearer
- Duncan Sheik
- Shwayze
- Gene Simmons
- Paul Simon
- Ashlee Simpson
- Helen Slater
- Kathy Sledge
- Michael W. Smith
- Dee Snider
- JD Souther
- Britney Spears
- Bruce Springsteen
- Layne Staley
- James Lee Stanley
- Paul Stanley
- Scott Stapp
- Jeffree Star
- Gwen Stefani
- Stephen Stills
- Barbra Streisand
- Bruce Sudano
- Rebecca Sugar
- Donna Summer
- Gene Summers
- Matthew Sweet
- Michael Sweet
- Taylor Swift
- James Taylor
- Courtney Taylor-Taylor
- Rob Thomas
- Justin Timberlake
- Ashley Tisdale
- Mark Tornillo
- Meghan Trainor
- Roger Troutman
- Joe Lynn Turner
- Jeff Tweedy
- Conway Twitty
- Steven Tyler
- Carrie Underwood
- Dave Van Ronk
- Eddie Vedder
- Kate Voegele
- Tom Waits
- Joe Walsh
- Crystal Waters
- Gillian Welch
- Kanye West
- Paul Westerberg
- Brooke White
- Jack White
- Maurice White
- will.i.am
- Hayley Williams
- Joseph Williams
- Paul Williams
- Ann Wilson
- Brian Wilson
- Nancy Wilson
- Kip Winger
- Kate Wolf
- Stevie Wonder
- "Weird Al" Yankovic
- Jim Yester
- Doug Yoel
- James Young
- Steven Van Zandt
- Donnie Van Zant
- Johnny Van Zant
- Ronnie Van Zant
- Frank Zappa
- Zendaya
- Rob Zombie

=== Uruguay ===
- Pablo Sciuto

=== Venezuela ===
- Ilan Chester
- Guillermo Dávila
- Aldemaro Romero
- Franco De Vita

=== Vietnam ===
- Sơn Tùng M-TP

== See also ==
- Lists of musicians
