= Lanning =

Lanning is a surname. Notable people with the surname include:

- Andy Lanning, British comic book writer and artist
- Dan Lanning (born 1986), American college football coach for the University of Oregon
- Dave Lanning (1938–2016), English sports commentator
- Frank Lanning (1872–1945), American silent film actor
- George Lanning (1925–1995), American novelist
- Jim Lanning (born 1960), American wrestler
- Joel Lanning (born 1994), American football player
- Johnny Lanning (1910–1989), baseball player
- Justin Lanning (figure skater), British ice dancer
- Justin Lanning (musician), American singer-songwriter
- Lauren Lanning, American beauty queen
- Lorne Lanning (born 1964), American game designer, writer, voice actor and animated film director
- Meg Lanning (born 1992), Cricketer, former Australian women's cricket captain, currently captain of the Delhi Capitals franchise in Women's Premier League
- Michael Lee Lanning (born 1946), United States Army officer
- Spencer Lanning (born 1988), American former professional football player
- William M. Lanning (1849–1912), American Republican politician

== Fictional characters ==
- Alfred Lanning, a character in Isaac Asimov's Robot series
