= Justin Lanning =

Justin Lanning may refer to:

- Justin Lanning (figure skater)
- Justin Lanning (musician)
