= Rob Heath =

Canadian singer-songwriter (born 1953)

- Born: May 3, 1953 (age 73); Edmonton, Alberta, Canada
- Genres: Americana, folk
- Occupation: Singer-songwriter
- Years active: 1988–present

Rob Heath is a Canadian singer-songwriter. He has released four studio albums since starting his career in the mid 1980s. He is actively performing in North America, and accompanies his singing on acoustic guitar, solo or with supporting instruments. In 2011 Heath won first place in the Calgary Folk Music Festival Songwriting Contest, was the winner in 2003 at the New Folk competition at the prestigious Kerrville Folk Festival, and won a Canadian Radio Music Award for “Songwriter of the Year”. He was also nominated for Canadian Folk Music Awards “English Songwriter of the Year”. Heath has written for Glen Campbell Music, Don Goodman Music and Criterion/Atlantic Music. Every month Heath opens the doors of his Edmonton home to host a songwriter circle for local singer/songwriters.

== Early life ==
Heath is the only son of visual artist Mel Heath and synchronized swimming coach and published author, Francis Heath. His younger sister Karen is also a gifted artist.

He graduated from Vic Composite High school in 1972 and attended the University of Alberta towards a political science degree. He graduated in 1977 and started his own business soon after. Music was his favorite pastime. Over the years his style changed from rock and roll to folk music.

After the release of his first album Play On, Heath concentrated his efforts on writing for other acts and visited LA and Nashville frequently. He did not start performing live until years later.

== Recording career ==
His first album Play On, released in 1988 on cassette, vinyl and CD reached the Canadian Top 40 Charts with Let’s Go Around The World Tonight and Baby I Wanna Do Right His second album Couple Of Times Round The Sun was released on June 24, 2005. In 2011 the 8th track Starlight Tours won first place in the Calgary Folk Music Festival Songwriting contest. His third album One More Day Above Ground was released on October 28, 2008 and was recorded using modern technology with musicians and singers connected through Internet in Nashville, Edmonton, and Vancouver. Technology played even a greater role in Heath’s fourth album The Trick, which was released on March 2, 2013.

== Discography ==
- Play On (1988) Big Stick Records
- A Couple Of Times Around The Sun (2005) Rob Heath Music
- One More Day Above Ground (2008) Rob Heath Music
- The Trick (2013) Rob Heath Music
- The Key (2016) Rob Heath Music
- Ticket To Everywhere (2019) Rob Heath Music
