= Faith Page =

American singer/pianist/composer/playwright

- Born: Faith Page; August 31, 1951 (age 74); Guatemala City, Guatemala
- Genres: Performing music from around the world and original music
- Instrument: Piano/voice
- Years active: 1981-current
- Label: Silver Birch Publishing
- Website: http://www.faithpage.net

Faith Page (born August 31, 1951) is an American singer, composer, and playwright who is best known for her 1992 song "Morning In Seattle".

== Life and work ==
Page was born in Guatemala City when her concert violinist father was there for an engagement. Her musical training began with the violin at the age of five years and the piano at six. Her first stage experience was at the age of seven when she played the Bach Double Concerto for Two Violins with her father in Punta Arenas, Chile. She then went on to learn to play ten different musical instruments and started writing and arranging her own compositions at the age of eleven years. As the oldest of seven children, she sang and played all over the world with her family, similar to the Von Trapp Family Singers, about whom "The Sound of Music" film was created. In college, she majored in music and studied under a vocal instructor named Lou Kelly, who was a pupil of Olaf College.

Page sings in English, Spanish, French, Italian, German, Greek, Hebrew and Portuguese. She has written more than 25 published songs, 16 of which are in Spanish. She has been on several radio shows around the world. Two of her songs, "Morning in Seattle" and "Just Me" have enjoyed radio play in the U.S., Canada, Russia, Germany and Hungary.

Known as Faith Starchman at the time prior to her marriage to Derek Page, (now deceased) with whom she performed on the "Royal Cruise Lines" and in Seattle, WA at Caesar's Club. The Rainier Club of Seattle Washington chose Page to do the French Bicentennial Cabaret Show, attended by many French dignitaries.

Page's hit song, "Morning in Seattle" was reviewed in both the Seattle Times, and the Chicago Tribune. She appeared on KING talk radio with Bob Hardwick, performing the song. The song then went on to be introduced to the city by Larry King, who then was the DJ of the Morning Show on KOMO radio (Seattle's largest AM station at the time). It enjoyed international radio play.

She was also on Laura Lee's Into the Night talk show on KING radio, featuring "Morning in Seattle" and "Just Me" a song she wrote for an original musical. Her album Magic was released in 2002. It contains four of her originals, including "Morning in Seattle" and "Just Me", and other songs in six different languages.

Page currently resides in Albuquerque, NM where she is concentrating on writing and composing. She is currently working on two different Broadway-style musicals. These include her solo work "A Place Called Time" and a collaboration with lyricist Jack Turner on "Wisteria".

== Discography ==
- 2002: Magic
