= Fernando Delgadillo =

Mexican musician and composer

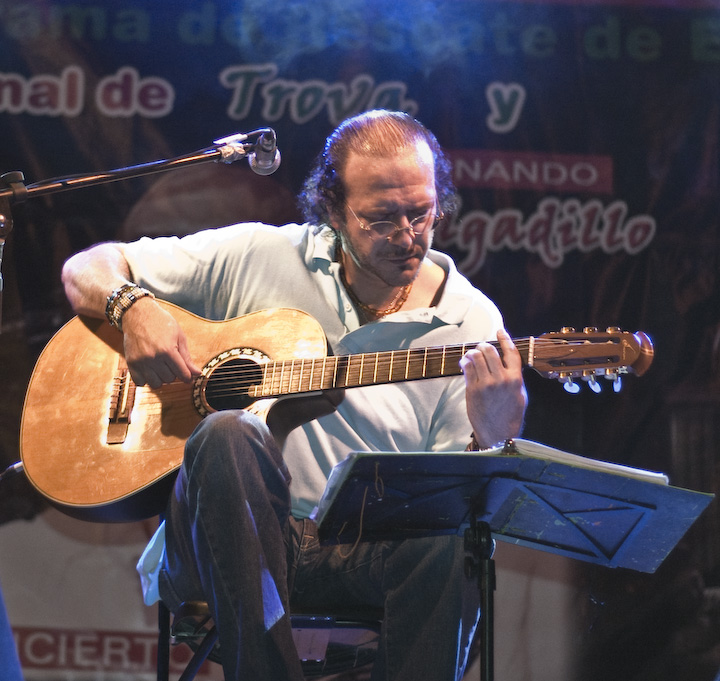
- Fernando Delgadillo in 2008.

Background information
- Born: December 7, 1965 (age 59); Tlalnepantla, State of Mexico, Mexico
- Origin: Mexico City, México
- Genres: Trova
- Occupation(s): Composer singer
- Instrument: Guitar
- Years active: 1986– present
- Labels: Discos Pueblo

Fernando Delgadillo (born December 7, 1965) is a Mexican musician and composer. He is considered a major representative of the Folk music genre in Mexico often referred to as ¨Trova¨ . He is considered the ¨Creador de la canción informal¨ (creator of informal songs.)

== Biography ==
In 1986, Delgadillo began performing in "El Sapo Cancionero", a venue in Mexico City popular with undiscovered folk singers. In 1988, he became a regular performer.

In 1989, along with other musicians and writers, he created SEIMUS, or "Sociedad de Escritores y Músicos Urbanos Subterraneos" (Society of Underground Urban Musicians and Writers).

In 1990, SEIMUS recorded a home-made cassette, and in the same year Delgadillo recorded another two, named "Fernando Delgadillo" and "La Cancion Informal" (Informal Song). in 1991 he recorded two more cassettes. In 1992, he recorded his first CD, "Con cierto aire a ti" (With a certain air of you). The words in this title also have a double-meaning in Spanish "Con cierto = With a certain; Concierto = concert".

He continued to record a number of albums in the years that followed, and in 1997 he travelled to the Beijing International Television Festival, as the only Spanish-speaking singer, and some of his songs are translated into Chinese.

Delgadillo was also invited to the "Youth Festival" in Cuba, and in 1998, he presented his first CD in front of a major audience in the Metropolitan Theater in Mexico City. Later on, he played alongside Cuban musician Silvio Rodríguez during his Mexican tour in the National Auditorium.

Later on, he recorded a compilation of his work in Spain.

Currently, he plays in major Mexican theatres on a regular basis.

== Topics ==
He mostly writes about everyday happenings, and has been often called the creator of an "informal" kind of songwriting. He is a master of metaphors and deals with topics such as nature, the longing of someone special, birthday gifts, popcorn fights, hot phone calls, etc. He specializes in describing the extraordinary out of something very ordinary.

== Selected discography ==
- Con cierto aire a ti (Fernando Delgadillo) [1993]
- Crónicas de Bruno del Breñal (Fernando Delgadillo) [1994]
- Desviaciones de la canción informal (Fernando Delgadillo) [1994]
- De vuelos y de sol (Fernando Delgadillo) [1995]
- Primer estrella de la tarde (Fernando Delgadillo) [1997]
- Entre pairos y derivas (Fernando Delgadillo) [1998]
- Hoy ten miedo de mí (Fernando Delgadillo) [1998]
- De vuelos y de sol (remaster) (Fernando Delgadillo) [1999]
- Febrero 13 (Volumen 1) (Fernando Delgadillo) [1999]
- Febrero 13 (Volumen 2) (Fernando Delgadillo) [2000]
- Febrero 13 (Volumen 3) [Web Only] (Fernando Delgadillo) [2000]
- Campo de sueños (Fernando Delgadillo) [2001]
- Variaciones de la canción informal (Fernando Delgadillo) [2004]
- Matutina (Fernando Delgadillo) [2004]
- Parque Naucalli (Fernando Delgadillo) [2006]
- Desde la Isla del olvido (Fernando Delgadillo) [2009]
- Sesiones Acústicas (Fernando Delgadillo) [2016]

== See also ==
- List of singer-songwriters/Mexico
