= David Steinhart =

American singer-songwriter and guitarist

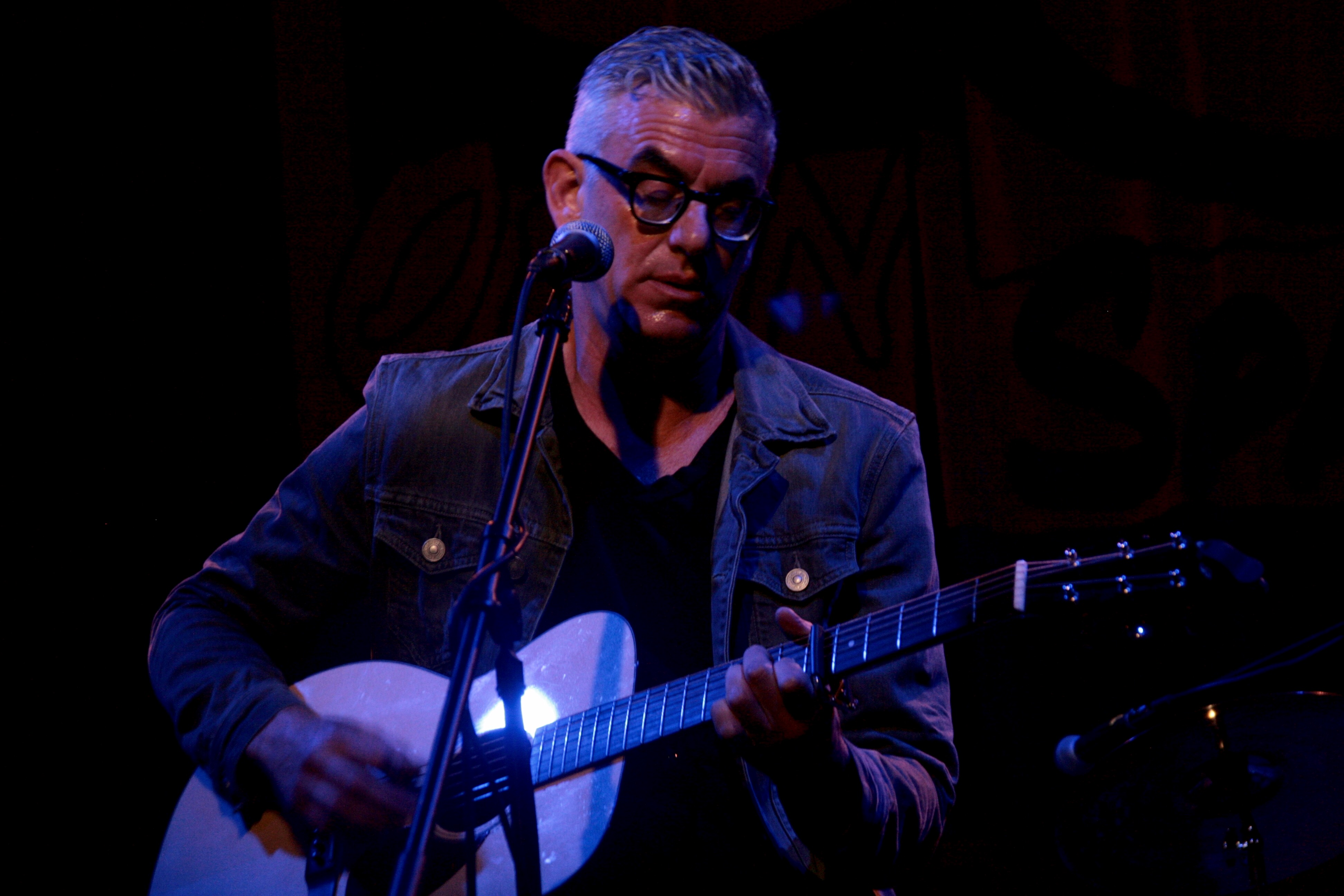
- Steinhart performing in 2016

Background information
- Born: David Steinhart
- Genres: pop, folk
- Years active: 1984–present
- Labels: Stonegarden Records

David Steinhart is an American singer-songwriter and guitarist, best known for the bands Pop Art, Smart Brown Handbag, and the Furious Seasons. He has been active in the Los Angeles pop scene since the 1980s.

== Career ==
Steinhart has been a staple of the Los Angeles indie pop scene since the 1980s. His career spans 30 years and over 20 releases.

He founded the band Pop Art in 1984 with his brothers, Jeff and Richard, and bassist Tony Ortega. Other players such as keyboardist Lyn Norton, drummers Steven Weisburd and his cousin, Steve LePatner, contributed to the band's albums over the years. Pop Art was active for 6 years and released 5 records.

After Pop Art disbanded, Steinhart released two solo albums before starting Smart Brown Handbag in 1993. Smart Brown Handbag included Norton, Cindy Albon, Steinhart's brother Jeff on bass, and John ‘Slim’ Glogovac on drums and percussion. SBH was active until 2006 and released 10 full-length albums.

Steinhart has been active in the Furious Seasons since 2008. Band members have included Jeff Steinhart (bass), Paul Nelson (guitar/vocals), Bob Gannon (drums/percussion), Eric Marin (keyboards), Nate Steinhart (guitars) and Ray Chang (violin/guitar/vocals). In late 2015, after the release of My Love is Strong, the band changed their focus to modern folk music. The band became an acoustic trio consisting of Steinhart and Nelson on acoustic guitar and vocals, and Jeff Steinhart on standup bass. The trio perform in the Los Angeles area, and has played shows with John Hiatt and David Lindley. Look West, the band's fifth album, was released in September 2016. It was Steinhart's first entirely acoustic studio album. The Furious Seasons have released 5 full-length albums and are still active and continue to record. In May 2017, the Furious Seasons released the single "We All Belong", a folk style protest song.

Steinhart's music has also been used in television and films.

== Musical style and reception ==
Music magazine the Big Takeover describes Steinhart's musical style as “soft, finely crafted, windswept pop,” commenting that Steinhart sings and writes, “warm, literate, sober, preoccupied folk pop, always well-crafted, and full of small, conspicuous, workmanlike extras (pacific strings, mellotron, piano, guitar tweets, a southern blues harmonica), [with an] aptitude for unpretentious, poppy hooks.”

Steinhart's music is often understated and driven by his distinct vocals, which critics have called a “privilege of craftsmanship”. His voice is noted for its range and has been called “soaring... redemptive... at once world-weary and angelic”, “cynical and charming at the same time.” The Arizona Daily Star labeled Steinhart's vocals in Pop Art, “clear, crisp, and angst-driven.”

Steinhart composes songs about relationships and heartbreak, earning him a reputation as “especially adept at chronicling complicated reunions with faded flames.” LA Weekly wrote that, “For anyone who needs a little reassurance about that thing called love (or has had it with whiny dirges on the radio), Smart Brown Handbag's ouch-that-hurts anti-luv songs, harmonies, bouncy bass lines, and-peppy rock-style riffing are just what the therapist ordered,” praising Steinhart's honesty in his lyrics.

Rolling Stone commended Smart Brown Handbag's The Big Sigh, writing that "Smart Brown Handbags catchy guitar pop has been rumored to be on the edge of greatness for a long time and we believe the hype." The Orange County Register defined SBH's sound as, “early R.E.M jangle-pop with Johnny Marr guitars and slightly, off-kilter Paul Weller-influenced vocals.”

== Discography ==
=== Solo ===
Year	Album details
1992	Everything She Says: Stonegarden Records
1993	The Almighty Night: Stonegarden Records
2001	Clean: Stonegarden Records

=== Pop Art ===
Year	Album details
1984	Radio Tokyo Tapes Vol 1: Ancient Art
1984	Pop Art: US 12-inch EP (Stonegarden SGN 266)
1985	A Perfect Mental Picture: US LP (Stonegarden SGN-267); GER LP - White Vinyl (Full Blast Records 941701)
1986	Long Walk to Nowhere: US LP (Stonegarden SGN-115); GER LP - White Vinyl (Full Blast Records)
1986	Live at KCRW: Bootleg
1987	Snap Crackle Pop Art: US LP (Stonegarden SGN-829); UK CD (Blue Moves BMCD 3001) (1988); UK LP (Blue Moves LPBM 3001) (1988); UK CS (Blue Moves)
1989	Never No: UK 7-inch Single (Blue Moves SBM 2); UK 12-inch EP (Blue Moves TSBM 2)
1989	Neon Fire: UK 7-inch Single (Blue Moves SBM 3)
1990	Later on in the Same Life: US CD (Stonegarden SGN 903)
2000	Really Blind Faith: A Retrospective, 1984-1990: US CD (Stonegarden SGN 954-2)

=== Smart Brown Handbag ===
Year	Album details
1993	Smart Brown Handbag: David Steinhart, Jeff Steinhart, Lyn Norton; Stonegarden Records
1994	Silverlake: David Steinhart, Jeff Steinhart, Lyn Norton, Steve LePatner; Stonegarden Records
1995	Sabrina: US 7-inch EP; Stonegarden Records
1996	Monkey in the Middle: Lineup change: David Steinhart, Cindy Albon, John Glogovac; Stonegarden Records
1997	Lullabies for Infidels: Stonegarden Records
1999	Little Things Are Everything: Stonegarden Records
2000	Just Like Driving Backwards: Stonegarden Records
2002	Fast Friends: Stonegarden Records
2004	The Big Sigh: with Jeff Steinhart; Stonegarden Records
2005	Harry Larry: Stonegarden Records
2002	Fast Friends: Stonegarden Records

=== Furious Seasons ===
Year	Album details
2008	The Furious Seasons: Stonegarden Records
2009	Thank You for Saturday: Stonegarden Records
2011	My Analog Face: Stonegarden Records
2015	My Love is Strong: Stonegarden Records
2016	Look West 2018  Now Residing Abroad  2020  La Fonda: Stonegarden Records
