= Eric Anders =

American singer-songwriter

- Years active: 2003–present
- Label: Baggage Room Records
- Website: www.ericanders.com

Eric Anders is an American singer-songwriter based in California.

== Music career ==
Anders released his first album in 2003, at the age of 39. Not at One was produced by Anders and Richard Barron. Anders collaborated on the songwriting with Mark O'Bitz and Benny Bohm. In 2004, Anders released the EP Songs For Wayward Days in protest of what Anders believed to be the illegitimate administration of George W. Bush. It was produced and mixed by Jeff Peters.

In 2005 Anders released his second album, More Regrets, produced by Grammy-winning guitarist, Randy Ray Mitchell. His third album, Tethered to the Ground, was released in 2006 and was produced by Matthew Emerson Brown. Anders' first releases were all mixed by Jeff Peters.

After a five-year break, Anders released the EP Remains In Me in 2011, also produced by Brown. The album was inspired the 1992 Michael Apted documentary, Incident at Oglala.

In 2017 Anders released the album Eleven Nine, which featured the Vilnius mural of Donald Trump kissing Vladimir Putin on its cover. The name of the album comes from the day on which President Trump was elected—the ninth of November—as well as referencing the date of the 9/11 Attacks, another event that Anders sees as catastrophic to the U.S.

In 2018, Anders released his first album as a duo with guitarist-composer Mark O'Bitz, Of All These Things.

After Of All These Things, the duo would release eight albums, six EPs, and seven singles.

Anders and O'Bitz released the single, "Matterbloomlight", in 2018 and it would be the inspiration for the duo's 2020 album American Bardo, created as an ode to the novel Lincoln in the Bardo by George Saunders.

Anders and O'Bitz worked with producer Mike Butler on both American Bardo and This Mortal Farce. They would work with Butler on every release after.

Anders, O'Bitz and Butler released their single "Careful Now My Son" in December 2020--and then their album Sirens Go By in February 2021. These releases are the first and second installments of their multi-release collection that is based around the theme of "music in the time of the coronavirus," which also includes the 2021 albums, Stuck Inside and Variant Blues.

Anders, O'Bitz, and Butler worked with Basque artist Joseba Elorza (Greenday) on the critically acclaimed "Searise" climate change music video.

Anders, O'Bitz, and Butler continued producing work that would mix Americana, rock, and folk with their albums The Loss We've Won (2022), So Far Gone (2022), Answers Belie (2023), and their EPs The Unencumbered Ones (2023) and Contrapasso (2024).

Their dual EP project, Bardo Hauntings (2022), were all remixes of the twelve American Bardo songs: six by Steven Jess Borth II and six by Mike Butler.

== Discography ==
Albums

- Not at One (2003)
- More Regrets (2005)
- Tethered to the Ground (2006)
- Big World Abide (2016)
- Eleven Nine (2017)
- Of All These Things (2018) with Mark O'Bitz
- Ghosts to Ancestors (2019) with Mark O'Bitz
- American Bardo (2020) with Mark O'Bitz
- Sirens Go By (2021) with Mark O'Bitz
- Variant Blues (2021) with Mark O'Bitz
- Stuck Inside (2021) with Mark O'Bitz
- Variant Blues (2021) with Mark O'Bitz
- The Loss We've Won (2021) with Mark O'Bitz
- So Far Gone (2021) with Mark O'Bitz
- Answers Belie (2021) with Mark O'Bitz

EPs

- Songs For Wayward Days (2004)
- Remains in Me (2011)
- This Mortal Farce (2020) with Mark O'Bitz
- Bardo Hauntings: Borth Remixes (2022) with Mark O'Bitz
- Bardo Hauntings: Butler Remixes (2022) with Mark O'Bitz
- The Unencumbered Ones (2023) with Mark O'Bitz
- Contrapasso (2024) with Mark O'Bitz

Singles

- Matterbloomlight (2018) with Mark O'Bitz
- Careful Now My Son (2020) with Mark O'Bitz
- Searise (2021) with Mark O'Bitz
- True September Songs (2021) with Mark O'Bitz
- One Life (2022) with Mark O'Bitz
- Simple Love (2023) with Mark O'Bitz
- Bryter Now: A Tribute to Nick Drake (2023) with Mark O'Bitz
