= Tiff Jimber =

American singer-songwriter

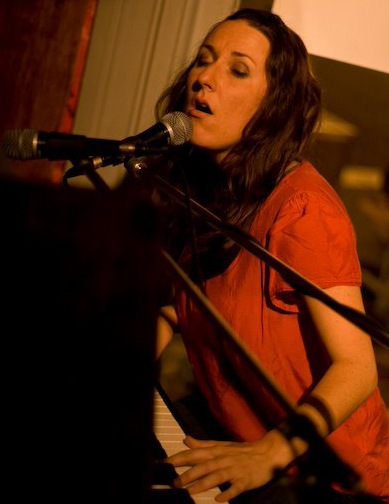
- Tiff Jimber performing live

Background information
- Birth name: Tiffany Anne Gyomber
- Born: Denver, Colorado, US
- Genres: Piano pop rock
- Occupation(s): Singer-songwriter, musician
- Instrument(s): Vocals, piano, accordion
- Years active: 2004–present
- Website: www.tiffjimber.com

Tiff Jimber is an American singer-songwriter whose songs have been used in movies and television, such as Love Happens, The Blind Side and Dolphin Tale. She was a contestant and finalist on VH1's Rock 'n Roll Fantasy Camp season 2.

== Early life ==
Jimber was born in Denver, Colorado, as "Tiffany Anne Gyomber" and was raised in San Diego. She began piano lessons at age 6 and was writing songs since she could speak. At the age of 16, she began performing at local open mike shows.

After high school, she was accepted to Berklee College of Music in Boston, Massachusetts, earning dual degrees in music production and engineering and songwriting. Immediately after graduation, she moved to Los Angeles and was employed at Conway Recording Studios in Hollywood and eventually began managing sound at the Whisky a Go Go. She slowly moved away from music engineering projects and started to focus on live performance, including a short time with the punk pop band Jerra. She eventually opted to perform solo, playing keyboard and accordion.

== Career ==
Jimber's first album, Obstacles, was recorded in fall 2004 and was self-produced and recorded in Santa Monica, California. Obstacles was nominated for AAA album of the year by The Los Angeles Music Awards. After two years of touring, she released her first LP, Perfectly, in 2006. In 2004, the composer Christopher Young used her vocals in the soundtrack for his score of the movie The Grudge. In 2009, Jimber released Burning at Both Ends, her second full-length record with the producer Matt Bobb.

In November 2009, her song "Love That You Need", co-written with Bobb, was placed in the iTunes movie trailer for the film The Blind Side. Young used her vocals again in his score of the film Love Happens. Her song "City Life" received honorable mention from the Billboard songwriting contest and was placed in the Australian Songwriting Contest. "Burning at Both Ends" was featured in US Weekly. She embarked on her first European tour in 2011, performing in various countries. She is the recipient of the ASCAP Plus Award from 2007 to 2013.

She was a finalist in VH1's Rock 'n Roll Fantasy Camp season 2, in the band The Bad Kick. She was the only keyboard player in the competition and was chosen by Matt Sorum to be a member of The Bad Kick. Jimber was coached by Sorum and The Bad Kick won the final battle during the season finale of the competition, hosted at the House of Blues in Hollywood.

In September 2011, "Reawakening", which was co-written with Bobb at Matchstick Music, was used in the Dolphin Tale exclusive featurette, Winter. Jimber co-wrote the song "Staying Up All Night" for the Disney star G. Hannelius and "Toyland" which was used as the opening number in the Disney Parks Christmas Day Parade.

== Songs ==
=== Tiff Jimber ===
All tracks are written by Tiff Jimber & Matt Bobb, except where noted

No.	Title	Length
1.	"Blind Love"	3:43
2.	"The Odyssey"	4:25
3.	"Reawakening"	3:30
4.	"Listening"	3:43
5.	"The Foundation" (Tiff Jimber)	5:06
6.	"Yours For Free"	4:19
Total length:		30:29

== Discography ==
Album name	Format	Year released
Obstacles	LP	2004
Perfectly	EP	2006
Burning at Both Ends	LP	2009
"Dynamite"	Single	2010
"Civil War"	Single	2011
The Foundation	EP	2013
