= Nanette Maxine =

- Also known as: Nanette Maxine Brown
- Born: Richmond, Virginia, Virginia, United States
- Genres: Christian
- Label: Xaman
- Website: www.nanettemaxine.com

Nanette Maxine is an American Gospel music and R&B singer, songwriter, and poet.

== Biography ==
Nanette Maxine Brown (born in Richmond, Virginia) was the fourth child in her family. She began singing at the age of five in a Southern Baptist church.

She was selected by the Songwriters Hall of Fame as the 1991 recipient of The National Academy of Popular Music's Abe Oleman Scholarship for songwriting excellence. In 2001 she won the Billboard R&B Songwriting Award and the Unisong International Song Competition. She has also been recognized by the John Lennon Songwriting Contest, the Mid-Atlantic Songwriters, and the Songwriters Association of Washington.

=== Discography ===
==== Albums ====
Don't Take Me for Granted

- Released: 2003
- Format: CD
- Label: Xaman

Conscious S.O.S.

- Released: 2005
- Format: CD
- Label: Xaman

== Awards and recognition ==
- 1991 recipient of The National Academy of Popular Music's Abe Oleman Scholarship for songwriting excellence presented by the Songwriters Hall of Fame.
