= Markus Rill =

German singer-songwriter (born 1970)

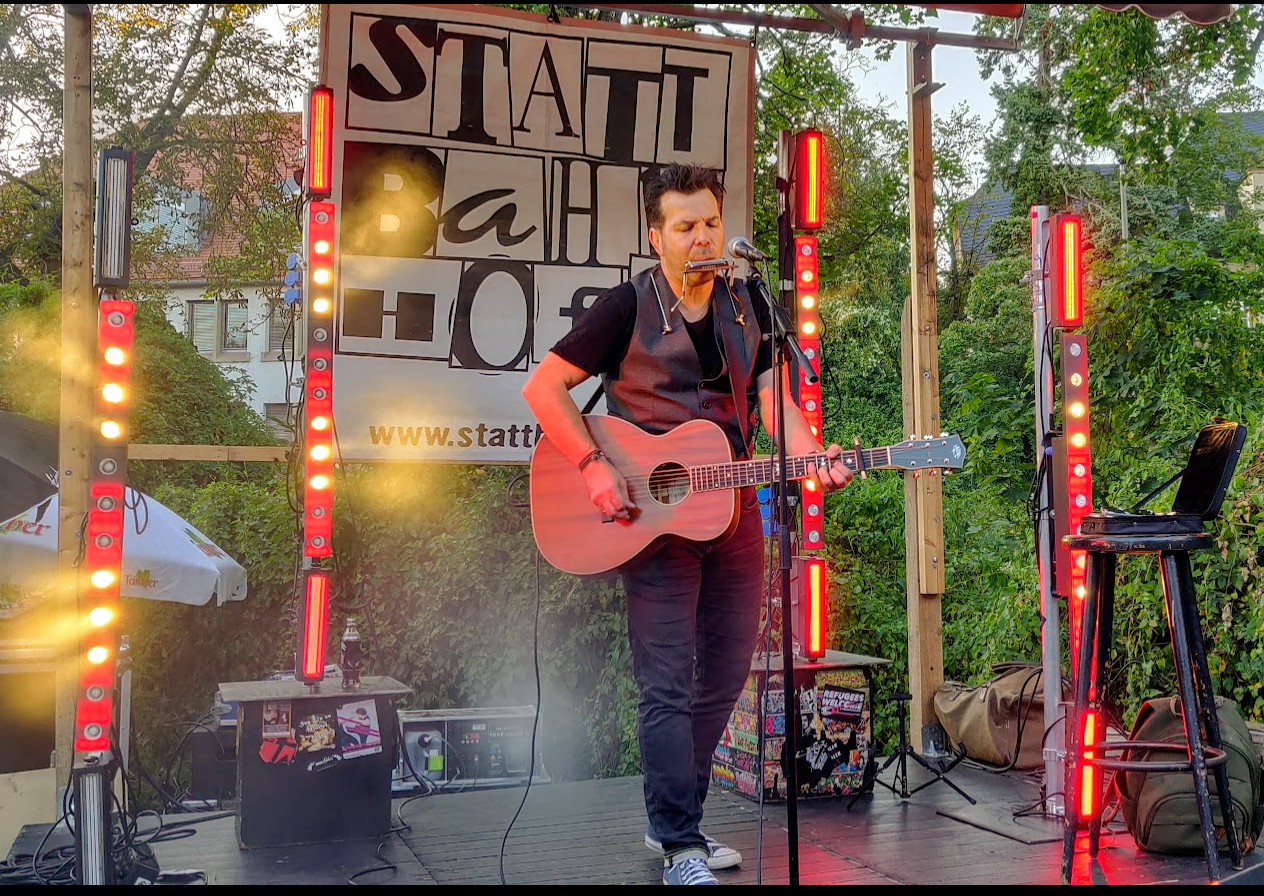
- Markus Rill on stage 2021
- Born: March 20, 1970 (age 56); Frankfurt am Main, West Germany
- Occupation: Singer-songwriter

Markus Rill is a German singer-songwriter.

== Biography ==
Rill was born on March 20, 1970, in Frankfurt am Main. He grew up in Goldbach near Aschaffenburg and won several German championship titles in wrestling and multiple team championships between 1987 and 1993 with the AC Bavaria Goldbach. He studied English, Sociology and Political Science at the Julius-Maximilians-Universität Würzburg.

In the course of his studies he spent a year in Austin, TX, where he followed his passion for American music in the tradition of Bob Dylan, Townes Van Zandt and Guy Clark, and got his first solo stage experience at Open Mics in the area.

== Career ==
After returning to Germany, he opened a show for his idol Townes van Zandt (in November 1996) and released his debut album Gunslinger's Talesin 1997 . After many gigs all over Germany supporting among others Hazeldine, Steve Wynn, and John Wesley Harding his second album The Devil and the Open Road was released on Blue Rose in 1999. Nowhere Begins on Music Network followed in 2001. Two albums came out in 2004: Hobo Dream, produced by guitarist Duane Jarvis and recorded in Nashville, TN and released once again by Blue Rose, and later the same year the self-released The Hobo Companion a collection of live recordings, demos, radio-cuts, and cover songs.

In May 2006, Blue Rose released Rill's sixth album The Price of Sin again recorded in Nashville.

Rill is strongly influenced by American rock, country, folk, blues, and gospel music. He counts as one of the leading Americana-artist in Europe, and is the only German who is under contract with Blue Rose Records. The label is based in Abstatt near Heilbronn, Germany, and is the European home for – among others – Kris Kristofferson, Steve Earle, Buddy Miller and Dwight Yoakam.

Rill's albums, Hobo Dream (2004) and The Price of Sin (2006), were recorded with well renowned musicians in Nashville, TN, who also have played with Grammy winners Lucinda Williams, Mark Knopfler, Buddy Miller or John Prine.

The Price of Sin climbed up to No,3 on the Euro-Americana Charts and was praised by the press. "If it’s one thing that I’ve learned about country music, it’s that it doesn’t always come from Nashville. Or even the United States for that matter. On his sixth album Rill conjures stories and peoples that could be our neighbors or figures from history. His expressive voice and direct songwriting have carried him throughout his career. On this latest effort he ups the ante and is ready to stake his claim to being as country as anyone else out there. He’s convinced us."

Since the release of Hobo Dream the singer and guitarist performs more frequently in the USA and all over Europe. After his performance at the Northwest Folklife Festival is Seattle, WA three of his songs were licensed for American independent film productions. A few of the songs Dying Bed (Hobo Dream), Broken Puppet, and The Price You Pay for Sin (The Price of Sin) were awarded by several renowned American songwriting competitions.

== Discography ==
- Gunslinger's Tales, 1997
- The Devil and the Open Road, 1999
- Nowhere Begins, 2001
- Hobo Dream, 2004
- The Hobo Companion, 2004
- The Price of Sin, 2006
- The Things That Count, January 2008
