= Dominique Gizelle =

American singer-songwriter

Dominique Gizelle is a full-time voice teacher and vocal coach, a singer/songwriter, producer, and arranger, who is active in both the creative and business aspects of music production and performance. She produces original music for use in television, film, video production and commercial release.

== Career ==
She has produced and managed original theater companies and productions. As an actor and vocal performing artist she has performed on national stages, in film and video, as well as voice over talent for commercial and industrial videos.

She has provided marketing and promotional consultation services to performing art venues and not-for-profit arts organizations including Town Hall for the Performing Arts (New York City, The Tilles Center for the Performing Arts (Long Island University C.W. Post Campus), and the Brooklyn Museum.

Gizelle is the co-founder, acting director, and membership chair of the Society of Independent Musical Artists. She is an Indiegrrl Performing Artist, and member of the Women In Music National Network.

== Credits ==
- Oxygen Network Pure Oxygen "Stripe" program and "DJ Monica" shows (featured artist)
- Laney Goodman’s "Women On Air" national radio show (featured artist)
- Michael Anthony Show Top 20 Songs of the Year; Voyage Beyond Radio
