= Sadie Jemmett =

- Born: Sadie Jemmett; 16 December 1970 (age 55)
- Origin: Cambridge, Cambridgeshire, England
- Genres: Folk rock, pop rock
- Occupations: Singer, songwriter, theatrical score writer
- Instruments: Vocals, guitar, dulcimer, piano, harmonica
- Years active: 1987–present
- Label: Mama's Music Recordings

Sadie Jemmett (born 16 December 1970) is a British singer-songwriter based in London, who plays guitar, piano, dulcimer and harmonica.

== Early life ==
Sadie Jemmett was born in Cambridge, and had a bohemian, runaway childhood. A major turning point came aged 12 when she discovered music and subsequently taught herself guitar. Between the ages of 14 and 21, Sadie Jemmett played in the bands African Ambassadors, Bridge, Easter Island and, most successfully, Soil. She wrote the music for plays at the Galway Arts Theatre, and toured around Europe, Estonia, Latvia and Lithuania with The Rose Theatre (International Touring) Company, writing the music and performing in the show "13 Mirrors" which received 5 star reviews in the Edinburgh Festival.

In 2000, she co-wrote (with DJ Frank Frenzy) the music for 'Résonances', which played at the Theatre d'Atelier, Paris, featuring French film star Irène Jacob and won a Molière award for best new show. An album of the songs from the show sold 3,000 copies in two months through the theatre while the song, "Making Sense", became a playlist favourite on Paris radio station FIP.

In 2001, she co-wrote (again with DJ Frank Frenzy) the music for Faustus Lite (Rose Theatre Co.), Edinburgh Festival, and Juliette & Romeo, Théâtre de Vidy, Lausanne, Switzerland. Some of this music has been used as the soundtrack of an educational Animal Rights DVD.

In 2003, Jemmett co-wrote with Robin Walden (aka Deepcutt) the score for a musical theatrical version of Bertolt Brecht's Good Woman of Szechuan at Théâtre Vidy, Lucerne & Théâtre de Chaillot, starring Irina Brook and Romane Bohringer. The score was later released on CD.

Jemmett performed at The Jazz Café, The Borderline, The Regal Rooms, The Bedford, The Stag and Monkey Chews in London, has supported KT Tunstall and Judy Collins and has played at the following festivals: Roxy Jam (2005, 2006), The Small World Festival (2005, 2006, 2008), The Secret Garden Party (2008), Down on the Farm (2009)

In 2012, Jemmett was featured on the compilation album Music is Love – A Singer-Songwriters' Tribute to the Music of Crosby, Stills, Nash and Young. Her cover of "Teach Your Children" has gained positive reviews and radio play in Europe and the United States.

In 2013, Jemmett self-released The Blacksmith's Girl on CD at Bandcamp and downloads on iTunes.

Jemmett's second album London Love Songs was released in August 2015.

== The Blacksmith's Girl ==
Jemmett's debut solo album, The Blacksmith's Girl, was written and performed by Sadie Jemmett, produced by Steve Lee, mixed and co-produced in Los Angeles by David Bianco and mastered in London by Kevin Metcalfe.

Reviews of The Blacksmith's Girl have been very positive: “Wowed us all – Record of the week" – Hit Sheet “Confessional and cathartic" – Uncut, "Moving and beautiful" – Acoustic Magazine, "Lovely and compelling" – Judy Collins, "A long time coming" ★★★★1/2 – Maverick Magazine, "Beautifully honest style & skills" ★★★★ – Belfast Telegraph, "A joy from start to finish" – Classic Rock Society
