= AmberRose Marie =

American singer

amberRose Marie
- Also known as: Amber Rose
- Born: Long Island, New York
- Genres: Dance, pop, house
- Occupations: Singer, songwriter
- Label: Catz Entertainment (2007–2011)
- Website: amberrosemarie.com

amberRose Marie (born in Long Island, New York) is an American dance and pop singer. She is known for her high energy stage shows, big vocals and always changing hair-color. She came on the club music scene with her 2008 debut single "Destiny" and her 2009 follow-up single "Wanna Be a DJ". In 2009, it was announced that she would be appearing in her own stage show.

== Early career ==
amberRose Marie (spelled with a small "a", two "r" second "R" capital, then Marie) gained an interest in singing early, singing in the choir at church. She took to her passion seriously, studying under Annabelle Franklin Allesse, and getting a classical training in singing. She also studied dance, and is well versed in dance techniques.

In her early career, amberRose Marie started out performing from an early age, at plays, festivals and small clubs and venues. She has a theater background, having starred in such plays as Woodstock Mania: Woodstock In Concert, in Theatre Three in New York. She involved herself in a traveling band performing in Atlantic City, Westbury Music Fair and nightclubs from Montauk and throughout New York. She recorded a number of self-penned songs, and proceeded to be noticed by the music world, by being invited to perform in the Long Island Radio Station, Party 105's Mega Jam, opening for Rockell, City High, and Digital Allies. According to amberRose Marie, "I began recording a few of my songs and even sold a few hundred records in local indie record stores, Mothers Music and Record Stop. So when I was chosen to perform at various shows to include radio station, Party 105 Mega Jam ... it motivated me to continue on.".

She then proceeded to perform at the Balloon Festival on the main stage, hosted by a top Long Island Top 40 radio station, 106.1 BLI, opening for Mýa and Dream Street. She also was invited to sing the national anthem for the Long Island Ducks, The New York Mets, and at various festivals, political events and parades. In 2006, amberRose Marie formed her cover band S.W.A.K. that performed a blend of rock and dance. At the same time, amberRose Marie formed a tribute to Janis Joplin and her band Joplins Pearl was born.

All the while, in order to continue to write songs and record demo?s, amberRose Marie held various jobs as a sign-maker, licensed cosmetologist, administrative assistant, a travel agent and advertising sales, in her teens and beyond. She also tried out for American Idol. While she made it to the west coast, she was forced to leave due to a personal friend ending up in the hospital.

In July 2007, 106.1 BLI's Hilary White who worked with amberRose Marie to promote one of her cover band gigs, suggested a meeting with an independent record label, Catz Entertainment. amberRose Marie wrote, "To my surprise, Catherine R. Laporte said, 'These demos are good, but let me hear what you sound like. Let me hear your voice.' You can imagine my surprise, when she said, 'We love your voice and your dance, pop, rock style!'". She was then signed with Catz Entertainment as a solo-artist under the name amberRose Marie.

== "Destiny" ==
In 2008, amberRose Marie released her debut single, 'Destiny'. After being introduced to DJs at the Billboard Dance Music Summit in Las Vegas, the song went on to reach #30 on Billboard's Hot Dance Club Party music chart, and remained on the chart for over 14 weeks. The dance single was picked USA DJs reported About.Dance, a subsidiary of The New York Times, at # 127 on Top 150 Club Chart- 2008 Year End music chart. It also remained on DJ Times chart for over 6 months, Myspace Music chart in the #1 spot for 3 weeks and the Top Ten for 6 weeks, as well as The Friday Morning Quarterback for 4 months. "Destiny" was played on over 100 radio mix shows and dance/top 40 radio stations, such as Sirius Radio, AOL Radio, PNN and others.

The maxi-single CD, released in 2008, included mixes by Norty Cotto, John Rizzo & Barry Huffine, Klubjumpers, Giuseppe D. Other notable remixes include mixes by Georgie Porgie, and Corey D.

amberRose Marie continued to do over 60 performances, playing in such venues as Jacob Javits Center, Resorts Casino at Boogie Nights, PURE Nightclub in Philadelphia, Virgin Megastore NYC, Prince's hotspot- The Empire Ballroom in Las Vegas, Gypsy, and shows for LIFEbeat, Simon Malls and the Billboard Dance Music Summit. She has opened for artists such as, The Trammps featuring Earl Young, Martha Wash, France Joli, Brett Michaels, and Randy Jones.

== 'Wanna Be A DJ" ==
In June 2009, amberRose Marie came out with a follow-up single to "Destiny", "Wanna Be a DJ". After debuting "Wanna Be a DJ" at the Winter Music Conference, the annual gathering of international DJs in South Beach Miami, "Wanna Be a DJ" was picked up by record pools around the US and Europe. The track became a Top 15 hit at #14 on the Billboard Hot Dance Club Party music chart and stayed on the chart for 13 weeks. It also ranked as a Top 10 at #7 on the DJ Times Crossover chart, #23 on the Dance Radio mix show chart, as well as making it onto the International Global Top 40 Chart on the Top 100, becoming an International dancefloor hit in over 15 countries.

In July 2009, the "Wanna Be a DJ" maxi-single entered full commercial release in stores, as part of a 23-track release with each mix bearing a different signature sound, from House to Jungle, Circuit, Rock, Trance, Euro and R&B. The CD features mixes by remixers/producers such as John Rizzo & Van Cronkhite, Klubjumpers, Maximus 3000, Davidson Ospina, Mike Cruz, Albert Castillo, Josh Harris, Giuseppe D., M-Deep (Mr. Mig and Sandeep Chatterjee), Majik Boys, Dave "Mix It Up" Fairman, and the R&B smooth lounge influenced M.I.S. featuring Atlanta rapper, Fresh.

== Community involvement ==
amberRose Marie has been heavily involved with LGBT issues, AIDS awareness, women, teen, and cancer organizations. As a LIFEBEAT Hearts & Voices artist, amberRose Marie lends her talent by performing her show in hospitals and residential locations where residents enjoy MTV styled concerts. amberRose Marie supports various LGBT organizations through Pride events and performing at the Original LGBT Expo. amberRose Marie has performed in Queens Pride, Staten Island Pride and Long Island Pride, Heritage of Pride Parade, and others. She has been an active member in LIFEBeat (The Music Industry Fights Aids), performing for charitable organizations, and has been a part of such service organizations as Kids in Action, University Hospice Hospital of Staten Island, and Long Island Gay and Lesbian Youth (LIGALY).

== Upcoming ==
In 2009, it was announced that amberRose Marie would be appearing in her own Casino stage show in Las Vegas in the Fall of 2009. The date, so far has not been released. amberRose Marie is also in the studio writing and recording songs for her first full-length CD to be released in 2010. amberRose Marie has also been tapped as a featured artist in the 2009 DJ Times International DJ Expo, the annual gathering of over 5000 DJs in Atlantic City. The performance will take place at the Trump Taj Mahal in August 2009.

== Discography ==
=== Singles ===
Year	Title	Chart Positions
Year	Title	Billboard Hot Dance Club Play
2008	"Destiny"	30
2009	"Wanna Be a DJ"	14
