= Jugpreet Singh Bajwa =

Indo-Canadian singer

Jugpreet Singh Bajwa ਜਗਪਰੀਤ ਬਾਜਵਾ
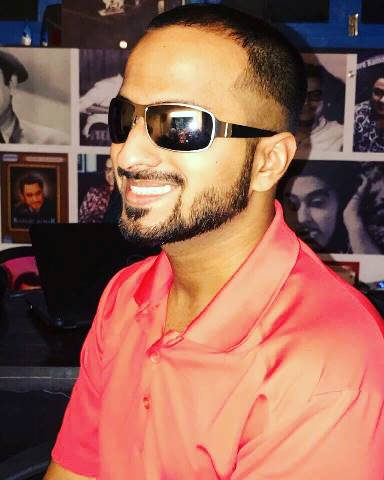

Background information
- Born: 5 October 1994 (age 31); Vancouver, British Columbia
- Occupation: Singer
- Years active: 2000–present
- Website: https://jugpreetbajwa.com/

Jugpreet Singh Bajwa (Punjabi: ਜਗਪਰੀਤ ਸਿੰਘ ਬਾਜਵਾ) is an Indo-Canadian Classical, Folk and Rock singer, who can sing in several languages – including English, French, Hindi & Punjabi. He has won many National and International Awards, and is known for his versatile performances in 'Bollywood Ek Tara Competition' (Vancouver, 2008) and 'Sa Re Ga Ma Pa' (Mumbai, 2016) – Actor Salman Khan praised Jugpreet's performance. Jugpreet also won the RED FM Idol 2010 Award. He was Runners-up in Canadian Desi Idol at Toronto in 2009, and in BC Junior Talent Competition. ‘Darpan’ magazine included Jugpreet amongst the ‘Newsmakers of 2016’.

‘Mid-Day’ newspaper wrote that Jugpreet Singh Bajwa lost his eyesight from retinoblastoma eye cancer when he was just six months old.

Jugpreet started singing on stage, and raised funds for various Charitable Societies & Trusts, e.g.: Sawan Mela, VIBC, Ismaili Walk A Thon, Surrey Fusion Festival, Festival of India, RBC DesiFest, Fiji Festival, Jamaican Festival, CFOFO, Cops for Cancer, BC Children Hospital, Post-Graduate Medical Institute & Hospital (Chandigarh), CNIB, Surrey Fusion Festival, etc.—more than 500 performances. ‘Desi Today’ magazine says that Jugpreet has been interviewed on several TV Channels, viz. Jus TV, Omni TV, Shaw TV, Delta TV, Sony TV, CKNW etc.

== Music albums ==
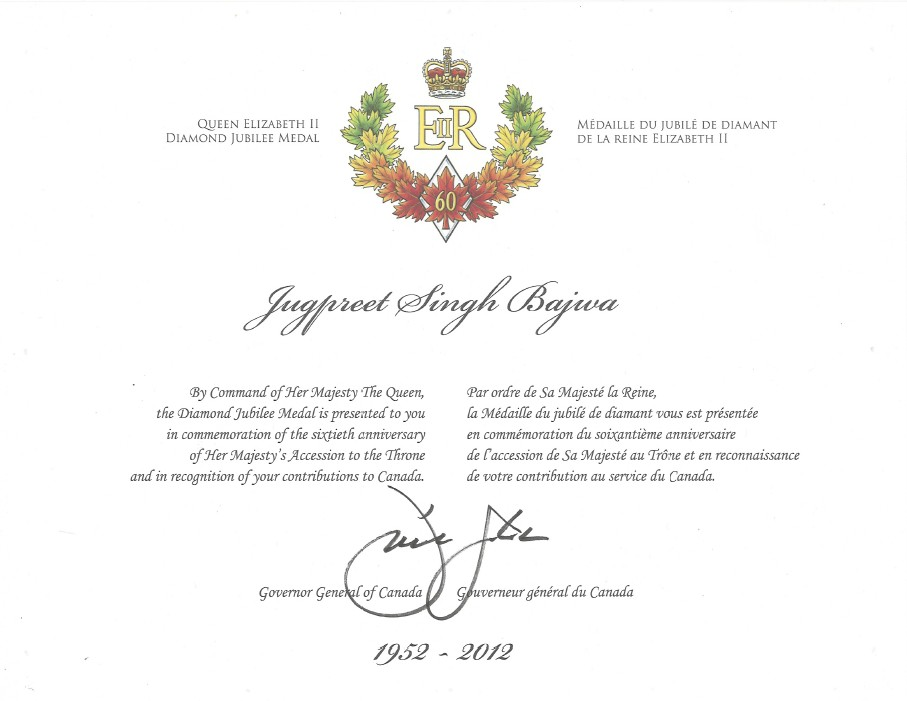
Certificate with Queen Elizabeth II Diamond Jubilee Medal presented to Bajwa by Governor General David Johnston, 2012

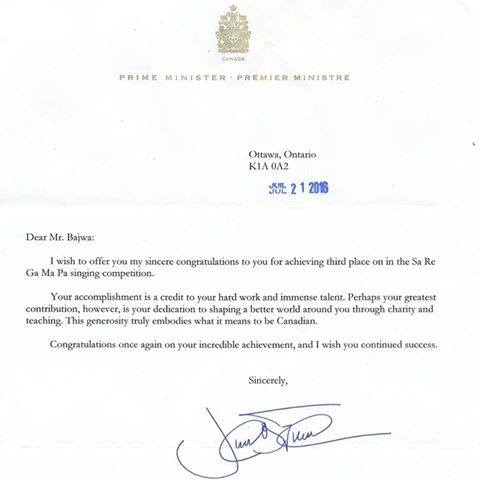
Letter from the Prime Minister of Canada, July 2016

Jugpreet recorded his first song, as a playback singer, for the Bollywood film that is being co-produced by Juhi Chawla. He has already released three music albums ‘Juggy de Nakhare’, ‘Gurbani Shabad Kirtan’, ‘Dil Vich’ and 'Rabb Diyaan Gallan'.
