= Marce =

Singer/songwriter

Marce (born 1974) is a singer/songwriter, born Marcela Pineros in Bogotá, Colombia. Marce is the second of four children born to filmmaker Antonio Jose Pineros and Reiki Master Maria Torres. She wrote her first song at age 9. Raised to be a nomad, Marce developed a diverse world view. Her commitment to social activism led her to pursue a degree in Women's Studies. Marce graduated summa cum laude from Florida International University in 2002. Her debut album, "Marce", was released that same year and received rave reviews. In 2005, she married Allen Guthier at a private ceremony in Gainesville, Florida. In recent years, Marce has performed across the United States and has been featured in publications such as InSite Magazine and FYI Weekly. She was awarded for Best Folk Song in 2006 by Song of the Year, sponsor of VH-1 Save the Music.

== Awards ==
- 2007 Independent Music Awards - Finalist - Band Website
- 2006 Singer/Songwriter Awards - Honorable Mention
- 2006 Song of the Year - Annual Winner - Best Folk Song
- 2006 Song of the Year - Monthly Winner - September 2006 - Best Folk Song
- 2006 Song of the Year - Monthly Winner - May 2006 - Best Folk Song
- 2006 Song of the Year - Monthly Winner - February 2006 - Best Folk Song

== Festivals/Showcases ==
- 2007 - International Folk Alliance Conference
- 2007 - NYC Chick Singer Night
- 2007 - LadyFest South
- 2006 - Dewey Beach Music Conference
- 2006 - First Coast Pride Festival
- 2006 - Miami Chick Singer Night

== Discography ==
- "Piece of Mind" (2009)
- "Hear My Voice - EP" (2006)
- "Sessions at Sonica" (2004)
- "Marce" (2002)
- "Echo" (2001)
