= Monica Kim =

Canadian singer-songwriter

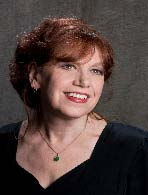
- Kim in 2008

Background information
- Born: 1947 (age 78–79); Germany
- Occupation: Singer-songwriter
- Years active: 1983–2000s
- Label: KAB Productions

Monica Kim is a Canadian singer-songwriter who had a hit in Colombia.

== Biography ==
Kim was born in Germany in 1947 and grew up in Stuttgart, immigrating with her parents to Canada in 1955. At age 30, her husband bought her a piano. Kim's first audiences were church members, and she soon branched out to create her own recordings and to perform in hotel lounges and concert halls.

In 1989, Kim spent four years performing in Colombia, Venezuela and Argentina. After her return to Canada in 2002, she began to teach vocals.

In 2008, KAB Productions released Kim's CD, Dreams Can Come True.

== Discography ==
- Dreams Can Come True (2008)

== Television appearances ==
- 1983: Weekend with the Stars
- 1982: Backstage CHCH-TV, Performance, Interview with Global TV News, Variety Club Telethon, Weekend with the Stars
- 1981: The Alan Thicke Show – four appearances
- 1980: The Bob McLean Show
- 1979: CBC Television special
