= Steven Zelin =

American singer/songwriter

Steven Zelin, also known as "The Singing CPA", is an independent singer/songwriter in New York City with a day job of a Certified Public Accountant. His music style spans humor, folk, and children's music.

Zelin was a 2006 winner of the iParenting Media Award for Best Audio Product for his CD Magical Boxes. He was featured in the NY Daily News "The Trusted Professional", and "Wall Street Journal.".
