= Bren Vaneske =

- Birth name: Brenda Vaneskeheian
- Origin: Ciudad Autónoma de Buenos Aires, Argentina
- Genres: Pop rock
- Years active: 2015–present

Bren Vaneske (full name: Brenda Vaneskeheian) is an Argentinian singer of Armenian background from Ciudad Autónoma de Buenos Aires. Some of her songs, including "1915", relate to her Armenian heritage and the Armenian genocide.

== Discography ==
=== Albums ===
- 2015 – Tiempo Real
