= Bob Hardwick =

American bandleader, pianist, and composer

Bob Hardwick was an American bandleader, pianist, and composer. He is best known as the bandleader of two long-established dance orchestras based in New York City, The Bob Hardwick Sound and The Bob Hardwick Sound Sensation.

The Bob Hardwick Sound is a multi-style big band dance orchestra that performs swing, society/two-step, rock, pop, soul, funk, R&B, disco, jazz, and latin. The Bob Hardwick Sound Sensation is primarily a pop-rock band, performing a full range of current and past Top 40 hits including rock ‘n’ roll, disco, funk, and R&B.

Hardwick and his musicians continue to be society regulars throughout the decades, performing for royalty, five Presidential Inaugural Balls, charity balls, and collaborating with musicians such as Paul McCartney and Natalie Cole.

== Early life and education ==
Hardwick was born in Louisville, Kentucky to parents John H. Hardwick, a banker and chairman of Louisville Trust, and June Warden, a model. Born with perfect pitch, he began playing the piano and composing at age four. He began taking classes at the University of Louisville School of Music when he was twelve.

Hardwick earned a B.A. from Centre College in Danville, KY, and continued his education at the University of North Texas, with a concentration in classical and jazz music. Hardwick also studied composition with Hall Overton at Juilliard School of Music, and attended Berklee College of Music on a scholarship from DownBeat magazine.

== Career ==
After his studies, Hardwick went into banking. He worked for Citibank in New York for nine years before joining U.S. Trust as vice president. Hardwick juggled careers in banking and music for over a decade by performing on weekends and holidays. Eventually, he decided to focus on his music career full-time in 1990.

The Bob Hardwick Sound has gone on to perform throughout the U.S., England, France, Italy, Ireland, Bermuda, and the Caribbean, with audiences including Presidents, British royalty, and celebrities. Today they can be heard at weddings, private parties, benefit galas, and corporate events, including performances at Lincoln Center's Midsummer Night Swing. Hardwick has been known to play over 300 engagements in one year.

Bob Hardwick is a past composer of the BMI Lehman Engel Musical Theatre Workshop. Hardwick's original theme scores can be heard in the television series America Goes To War: The Homefront in World War II and Hunters in the Sky.

Hardwick has worked with artists such as Tex Beneke, Buddy Morrow, and Joe Reichman. Two of his pop compositions are featured on the album Motivation by singer-songwriter Bob Crewe, originally released on Electra and later reissued under The Complete Electra Recordings on Real Gone Music (Rhino Entertainment Company). Bob Hardwick is also featured as a singer on the companion album Street Talk.

== Awards ==
He won a Coca-Cola Talent Contest and the Youth Talent Exhibit in Louisville, KY for a song titled "Keep-a-Going." Hardwick is also the recipient of two songwriter awards from The Castlebar International Song Contest, the second richest song contest in the world.

== Discography ==
- Dancing with the Rich and Famous (1994)
- Millennium Mornings (1999)
- High Society Dance Hits (Reissue) (2002)
- Party Time at the Coral Beach Club, Bermuda (2005)

== Personal life ==
Bob Hardwick works and resides in New York City with his wife, Elizabeth Hardwick.
