= Justin Lanning (musician) =

American singer-songwriter (born 1985)

- Birth name: Justin Drew Lanning
- Born: 28 November 1985 (age 39)
- Origin: Los Angeles, California
- Genres: Pop rock
- Instruments: Vocals, guitar, piano, drums
- Years active: 2007-present
- Labels: Just Love Records
- Website: JustinLanning.com

Justin Lanning (born November 28, 1985) is a Los Angeles–based singer-songwriter. He began singing at age nine.

== Career ==
In 2008, a DJ Escape remix of his single Take My Breath Away was listed on the Billboard Hot Dance Club Play Chart. It entered the chart at No. 45 on 28 June 2008 spending two weeks at its highest position of No. 13. It spent at least 11 weeks on the chart.
