= New Zealand Idol season 2 =

New Zealand Idol
- Season 2
- Hosted by: Dominic Bowden
- Judges: Paul Ellis; Jackie Clarke; Frankie Stevens
- Winner: Rosita Vai
- Runner-up: Nik Carlson

Release
- Original network: TVNZ
- Original release: 3 July – 17 October 2005

Season chronology
- ← Previous; Season 1 Next → Season 3

The second season of New Zealand Idol commenced on 3 July 2005. The judges were Paul Ellis, Jackie Clarke and Frankie Stevens.

== Auditions ==
The auditions were held at the following locations:

- Telstraclear Pacific Events Centre, Manukau
- Riccarton Racecourse, Riccarton, Christchurch
- Trentham Racecourse, Trentham, Upper Hutt

Those who were successful would proceed to the "Top 60" theatre rounds held at the Telstraclear Pacific Events Centre in Auckland.

== Theatre Week ==
The successful contestants who made it through to the "Top 60" rounds would spend a gruelling three days at the theatre.

- Day One: Contestants, in groups of six, were to sing in turn, a cappella, a song of their own choice. This year the judges deliberated immediately after each line sang, then delivered the verdict.

Eliminated: Carlie Howe, Francis Walker, Rachael, Kylie Adams, Amomai Pihema, Sera Devcich, Sally, Jamie,

- Day Two: Trio performances would test the contestants' teamwork skills, with the guys performing Ben E. King's "Stand by Me", while the girls would perform Bill Withers' classic "Lean on Me." At the end of this, the group was once more reduced by a further 12.

Eliminated: Herb, Tipene, Cre'-Ammon, Krystel, Ruth, Alison, Sarah,

- Day Three: The remaining 36 contestants have one last opportunity to impress the judges. Once again they were to perform solo, (a cappella), in front of the judges.

Eliminated: Lance Ainofo, Tiresa, Nikki, Letitia, Peter Jackson, Lorna, Jamie Lamb,

The decision of the final cut to the "Top 24" was delivered to three groups of twelve, with one group being sent home.

== Top 24 ==
=== Group 1 ===
- Frank Andrews – "Nice and Slow" by Usher
- Kevin Malagamaali'i – "I Believe I Can Fly" by R. Kelly
- Christine Hutt – "Out of the Blue" by Delta Goodrem
- Keshia Paulse – "Hero" by Mariah Carey
- Marcel Bramao – "How Sweet It Is (To Be Loved by You)" by James Taylor
- Steven Broad – "Here Without You" by 3 Doors Down
- Katherine Creed – "Breakaway" by Kelly Clarkson
- Pip Kayser – "One Way or Another" by Blondie

Advancing to the Top 10: Frank Andrews, Keshia Paulse and Steven Broad
Wildcard Contenders: Kevin Malagamaali'i, Marcel Bramao

=== Group 2 ===
- Saelyn Guyton – "I Feel the Earth Move" by Carole King
- Daniel Bell – "Virtual Insanity" by Jamiroquai
- Rick Bhatia – "This Love" by Maroon 5
- Lissel Stewart – "Chains" by Tina Arena
- Rosita Vai – "I Have Nothing" by Whitney Houston
- Shelley Paikea – "Saving All My Love for You" by Whitney Houston
- Mathew Morris – "When the War Is Over" by Cold Chisel
- Ashley Cooper – "Love Really Hurts Without You" by Billy Ocean

Advancing to the Top 10: Rosita Vai, Shelley Paikea and Ashley Cooper
Wildcard Contenders: Saelyn Guyton, Lissel Stewart

=== Group 3 ===
- Clark To'o – "If There's Any Justice" by Lemar
- Rongo Brightwell – "Superstar" by The Carpenters
- Jesse O'Brien – "If You Could Only See" by Tonic
- Maselina Leimoa – "If I Ain't Got You" by Alicia Keys
- Teresa Bergman – "Uninvited" by Alanis Morissette
- Malia Matthews – "One Moment in Time" by Whitney Houston
- Nik Carlson – "I'm Your Baby Tonight" by Whitney Houston
- Makuini Taikato – "Reflection" by Christina Aguilera

Advancing to the Top 10: Rongo Brightwell, Jesse O'Brien and Nik Carlson
Wildcard Contenders: Clark To'o, Maselina Leimoa, Teresa Bergman, Malia Matthews

=== Wildcards ===
- Saelyn Guyton – "All Cried Out" by Allure
- Kevin Malagamaali'i – "Dance with My Father" by Luther Vandross
- Maselina Leimoa – "Brown Eyes" by Destiny's Child
- Teresa Bergman – "Burn" by Tina Arena
- Lissel Stewart – "Hit 'em Up Style (Oops!)" by Blu Cantrell
- Clark To'o – "Ordinary People by John Legend
- Marcel Bramao – "Your Body Is a Wonderland" by John Mayer
- Malia Matthews – "Stranded" by Lutricia McNeal

Advancing to the Top 10: Teresa Bergman

== Weekly Song Themes ==
Date	Week	Theme	Guest Judge
21 August	Top 10	Contestant's Choice	none
28 August	Top 9	The '80's	none
4 September	Top 8	World #1's	none
11 September	Top 7	My Generation	none
18 September	Top 6	Soul	Marcia Hines
25 September	Top 5	Rock	Jon Stevens
3 October	Top 4	Homegrown	none
10 October	Top 3	Love Songs	none

== The Top 10 Contestants ==
=== Rosita Vai ===
Rosita Vai (born 4 June 1981 in Auckland) was the winner of the second series of "New Zealand Idol".

Audition: "I Have Nothing" by Whitney Houston
Theatre Week (Round 1):
Theatre Week (Round 3): "Work it Out" by Beyoncé Knowles
Top 24: "I Have Nothing" by Whitney Houston
Top 10: "Nobody's Supposed to Be Here" by Deborah Cox
Top 9: "I'm Coming Out" by Diana Ross
Top 8: "Always Be My Baby" by Mariah Carey
Top 7: "Golden" by Jill Scott
Top 6: You're All I Need" by Aretha Franklin
Top 5: "If It Makes You Happy" by Sheryl Crow
Top 4: "Sweet Lovers" by The Holidaymakers, "Language" by Annie Crummer
Top 3: "I Can't Tell You Why" by The Eagles, "Dangerously in Love" by Beyoncé Knowles
Top 2: "How Come You Don't Call Me?" by Alicia Keys, "Golden" by Jill Scott, "All I Ask" (Winner's single)

=== Nik Carlson ===
Nikat "Nik" Carlson (born 8 November 1978 in Masterton), was the runner-up.

Audition: "Let Me Love You" by Mario
Theatre Week (Round 1): "Hero" by Enrique Iglesias
Theatre Week (Round 3): "Me and Mrs. Jones" by Billy Paul
Top 24: "I'm Your Baby Tonight" by Whitney Houston
Top 10: "Don't You Worry 'bout a Thing" by Stevie Wonder Bottom 3
Top 9: "Sweet Love" by Anita Baker Bottom 2
Top 8: "Under the Bridge" by Red Hot Chili Peppers
Top 7: "I Believe in a Thing Called Love" by The Darkness / Lemar
Top 6: "Let's Stay Together" by Al Green
Top 5: "Beating Heart Baby" by Head Automatica
Top 4: "Watchin' U" by Ardijah, "It's Too Late" by Evermore Bottom 2
Top 3: "Someone to Love" by Jon B. & Babyface, "Is This Love" by Bob Marley
Top 2: "Never Too Much" by Luther Vandross, "I Believe in a Thing Called Love" by The Darkness / Lemar, "All I Ask" (Winner's single)

=== Steven Broad ===
Steven "Steve" Broad (born 29 January 1986, from Invercargill), was the last contestant sent home.

Audition: "Tomorrow" from the film, "Annie"
Theatre Week (Round 1): "Better Be Home Soon" by Crowded House
Theatre Week (Round 3): "I Can See Clearly Now" by Johnny Nash
Top 24: "Here Without You" by 3 Doors Down
Top 10: "Spin" by Lifehouse
Top 9: "With or Without You" by U2
Top 8: "(Everything I Do) I Do It for You" by Bryan Adams Bottom 3
Top 7: "Smooth" by Santana & Rob Thomas Bottom 3
Top 6: "Signed, Sealed, Delivered (I'm Yours)" by Stevie Wonder Bottom 3
Top 5: "Higher" by Creed
Top 4: "Walls" by Shihad, "Stand Up" by The Feelers
Top 3: "Your Song" by Elton John, "Burn for You" by John Farnham

=== Jesse O'Brien ===
Jesse O'Brien, (born 25 September 1977, in Dunedin, now residing in Hamilton), was the seventh contestant sent home.

Audition: "Be Yourself" by Audioslave
Theatre Week (Round 1): "One Last Breath" by Creed
Theatre Week (Round 3): "Nothing Can Wait" by Opshop
Top 24: "If You Could Only See" by Tonic
Top 10: "Be Yourself" by Audioslave
Top 9: "Where the Streets Have No Name" by U2
Top 8: "Incomplete" by The Backstreet Boys
Top 7: "I Don't Want to Be" by Gavin DeGraw
Top 6: "Hard to Handle" by Otis Redding Bottom 2
Top 5: "Best of You" by The Foo Fighters Bottom 2
Top 4: "Why Does Love Do This To Me?" by The Exponents, "No Ordinary Thing" by Opshop Eliminated

=== Teresa Bergman ===
Teresa Bergman (born 14 October 1986, in Lower Hutt), was the sixth contestant sent home. She originally missed out on a place in the Top 10 but was brought back for the Wildcard Special and received the last position into the live shows as a contestant.

Audition: "Secret Song" by Alanis Morissette
Theatre Week (Round 1): "Only When I Sleep" by The Corrs
Theatre Week (Round 3):
Top 24: "Uninvited" by Alanis Morissette
Wildcard: "Burn" by Tina Arena
Top 10: "Mascara" by Killing Heidi
Top 9: "Roam" by The B-52's Bottom 3
Top 8: "Foolish Games" by Jewel
Top 7: "Going Under" by Evanescence
Top 6: "Walk On By" by Dionne Warwick
Top 5: "Zombie" by The Cranberries Eliminated

=== Rongo Brightwell ===
Rongo Brightwell (16 September 1987 in Mohaka, Hawke's Bay), was the fifth contestant sent home.

Audition: "Superstar" by The Carpenters
Theatre Week (Round 1): "Dancing in the Street" by Martha and the Vandellas
Theatre Week (Round 3): "I Heard It Through the Grapevine" by Marvin Gaye
Top 24: "Superstar" by The Carpenters
Top 10: "Hidden Agenda" by Craig David
Top 9: "Get Outta My Dreams, Get into My Car" by Billy Ocean
Top 8: "Never Gonna Give You Up" by Rick Astley
Top 7: "Colour Me Life" by Katchafire Bottom 2
Top 6: "Ain't Too Proud to Beg" by The Temptations Eliminated

=== Frank Andrews ===
Franklin "Frank" Andrews (born 22 June 1985, in Rotorua), was the fourth contestant sent home.

Audition: "O" by Omarion
Theatre Week (Round 1): "Let Me Love You" by Mario
Theatre Week (Round 3): "A Whole New World" by Peabo Bryson and Regina Belle
Top 24: "Nice and Slow" by Usher
Top 10: "How Could You" by Mario
Top 9: "I Want to Wake Up with You" by Boris Gardiner
Top 8: "Bump, Bump, Bump" by B2K & P Diddy Bottom 2
Top 7: "That Girl" by Marques Houston Eliminated

=== Ashley Cooper ===
Ashley Cooper (born 23 February 1988 in Cambridge), was the third contestant sent home.

Audition: "When You Say Nothing at All" by Ronan Keating
Theatre Week (Round 1): "Midnight Train to Georgia" by Gladys Knight
Theatre Week (Round 3): "When I See You Smile" by Bic Runga
Top 24: "Love Really Hurts Without You" by Billy Ocean
Top 10: "Everywhere" by Michelle Branch Bottom 2
Top 9: "Listen to Your Heart" by Roxette
Top 8: "Don't Speak" by No Doubt Eliminated

=== Keshia Paulse ===
Keshia Paulse (born 14 December 1984 in Auckland), was the second contestant sent home.

Audition: "Natural Woman" by Aretha Franklin
Theatre Week (Round 1):
Theatre Week (Round 3): "Chain of Fools" by Aretha Franklin
Top 24: "Hero" by Mariah Carey
Top 10: "Only Believe" by Yolanda Adams
Top 9: "Let's Hear It for the Boy" by Deniece Williams Eliminated

=== Shelley Paikea ===
Shelley Paikea (born 25 May 1981 in Pukekohe), was the first contestant sent home.

Audition:
Theatre Week (Round 1): "I Wanna Dance with Somebody" by Whitney Houston
Theatre Week (Round 3):
Top 24: "Saving All My Love for You" by Whitney Houston
Top 10: "Lovin U" by Alicia Keys Eliminated

== The Top 10 Group Performances ==
The Top 10: "Dedicated to the One I Love" by The Shirelles
The Top 9: "Wake Me Up Before You Go-Go" by Wham!
The Top 8: "Unchain My Heart" by Joe Cocker
The Top 7: "The Reason" by Hoobastank
The Top 6: "You Can't Hurry Love" by The Supremes
The Top 5: "Life Is a Highway" by Tom Cochrane
The Top 4: "Glorafilia" by Zed
The Top 3: "If I Let You Go" by Westlife
The Top 2: "Upside Down" by Diana Ross

== The Grand Final ==
The final was held on 17 October, with the following performances:

- Lissel Stewart, Marcel Bramao, Saelyn Guyton: "Crazy" by Seal
- Shelley Paikea: "Lovin U" by Alicia Keys
- Keshia Paulse: "Only Believe" by Yolanda Adams
- Ashley Cooper: "Everywhere" by Michelle Branch
- Frank Andrews: "How Could You" by Mario
- Rongo Brightwell: "Get Outta My Dreams, Get into My Car" by Billy Ocean
- Teresa Bergman: "Going Under" by Evanescence
- Jesse O'Brien: "Where the Streets Have No Name" by U2
- Steve Broad: "Spin" by Lifehouse
- The Top 10: "Shout" by Tears for Fears
- Rosita Vai: "Dangerously in Love" by Beyoncé Knowles
- Nik Carlson: "Let's Stay Together" by Al Green
- Frank, Jesse, Rongo & Steve: "Tainted Love" by Soft Cell
- Keshia, Ashley, Shelley & Teresa: "Walking on Sunshine" by Katrina and the Waves
- Frankie Stevens & Jackie Clarke: "Put a Little Love in Your Heart" by Jackie DeShannon
- Ben Lummis & Sela Mahe: "Never Say I Love You" by Ben Lummis
- Rosita Vai: "All I Ask" (winner's single)

== Elimination chart ==
Legend
Did Not Perform	Top 24	Wild Card	Top 10

Stage:		Semi-Finals			WC	Finals								
Week:		25/7	1/8	8/8	15/8	22/8	29/8	5/9	12/9	19/9	26/9	3/10	10/10	17/10
Place	Contestant	Result												
1	Rosita Vai		Top 10											Winner
2	Nik Carlson			Top 10		Btm 3	Btm 2					Btm 2		Runner-up
3	Steven Broad	Top 10						Btm 3	Btm 3	Btm 3			Elim	
4	Jesse O'Brien			Top 10						Btm 2	Btm 2	Elim		
5	Teresa Bergman			Elim	Top 10		Btm 3				Elim			
6	Rongo Brightwell			Top 10					Btm 2	Elim				
7	Frank Andrews	Top 10						Btm 2	Elim					
8	Ashley Cooper		Top 10			Btm 2		Elim						
9	Keshia Paulse	Top 10					Elim							
10	Shelley Paikea		Top 10			Elim								
Wild; Card	Marcel Bramao	Elim			Elim									
Wild; Card	Saelyn Guyton		Elim		Elim									
Wild; Card	Maselina Leimoa			Elim	Elim									
Wild; Card	Kevin Malagamaali'i	Elim			Elim									
Wild; Card	Malia Matthews			Elim	Elim									
Wild; Card	Lissel Stewart		Elim		Elim									
Wild; Card	Clark To'o			Elim	Elim									
Semi- Final; 3	Makuini Taikato			Elim										
Semi- Final; 2	Daniel Bell		Elim											
Semi- Final; 2	Rick Bhatia		Elim											
Semi- Final; 2	Mathew Morris		Elim											
Semi- Final; 1	Christine Hutt	Elim												
Semi- Final; 1	Katherine	Elim												
Semi- Final; 1	Pip Kayser	Elim												
