= Carly Binding =

New Zealand singer-songwriter

- Born: Carly Binding; 2 February 1978 (age 48)
- Origin: Tauranga, Bay of Plenty, New Zealand
- Genre: Pop
- Instruments: Vocals, guitar

Carly Binding (born 2 February 1978) is a New Zealand pop singer-songwriter, and former member of the girl group TrueBliss.

== TrueBliss ==
After a successful string of auditions, Binding joined Joe Cotton, Keri Harper, Erika Takacs, and Megan Alatini, to be part of New Zealand pop girl group TrueBliss who formed in April 1999 on the popular television show Popstars, which aired on TVNZ's TV2 channel for nine weeks in the search for a new girl group. TrueBliss were the first ever group to be formed under the Popstars franchise.

They enjoyed commercial success with their debut single "Tonight" which debuted at No.1 and remained in the top 40 for 10 weeks, being certified platinum for sales of over 10,000 copies.

"Number One" was the follow-up to "Tonight", achieving a No.12 position on the New Zealand charts. In September 1999 a cover of the George Michael penned "Freedom" was released but failed to chart. Columbia discussed a follow-up album to the platinum 11-track debut Dream in 1999, but it was never recorded.

In 2000 she left the group, citing personal differences, and decided to pursue a solo career.

== Solo career ==
Bindings debut single, 'Alright With Me (Taking It Easy)' was released in July 2002, and peaked at No.10 on the charts. Her second single, 'We Kissed', was originally written by Binding for the first single off TrueBliss's cancelled second album and went on to peaked at No.7 on the New Zealand Chart.

Binding then released her third single, 'Love Will Save Me', in May 2003 before releasing her debut solo album Passenger which peaked at No.6 on the New Zealand album charts and went gold. Passenger was produced with Stellar's Andrew Maclaren and Chris van de Geer, with a number of tracks mixed in Los Angeles by Chris Lord-Alge. It was also released in Australia, where Binding has since toured extensively.

The final single, 'This Is It', was released in September 2003, completing a successful first album campaign with all 4 singles peaking within the Top 20 of the New Zealand Singles Chart.

In 2002 Binding supported Ronan Keating on his New Zealand tour and Paul Kelly in front of a Melbourne crowd, and then the next year she supported Bryan Adams.

Her second (and final) album So Radiate was released on 3 July 2006 and featured 3 singles although these did not chart. Supporting this album, she undertook a tour of New Zealand with fellow singer-songwriter Donald Reid.

In 2007, Binding was invited to play at the music festival SXSW which is held in Austin, Texas each year. This led to her spending a further four months in the US playing regular shows at venues on the Sunset Strip and surrounding areas in Los Angeles.

== Personal life ==
Binding was born and raised in the city of Tauranga, to Wellesley Binding who is a New Zealand painter and was named after singer Carly Simon.

She grew up on a farm in Paengaroa, Bay of Plenty, and was home-schooled until the age of 9.

From 2009 to 2015, Binding was in a relationship with former Kiwi league player Matthew Ridge. In November 2010, the couple had a son, London Luca Ridge. The couple separated in 2014 and Binding confirmed the split in February 2015.

She became engaged to long-term partner Andy Mateljan in March 2022, and they share a son together who they welcomed into the world in November 2019.

== Other Work ==
Binding appeared in Xena: Warrior Princess in one episode in 2001, Soul Possession. She also appeared in one episode of The Jaquie Brown Diaries in 2008, Self - Kiwi Olympic Supporters Inc.

In 2012 Binding appeared on the Auckland musical theatre scene , making her musical theatre debut starring in the one-woman show "Tell Me On A Sunday" (directed by David Coddington, music by Andrew Lloyd Webber, lyrics by Don Black). The show ran 14-24 November at Q's Loft theatre in Auckland and was highly critically-acclaimed.

== Discography ==
=== With TrueBliss ===
- Dream (1999) Columbia

=== Albums ===
Year	Title	Details	Peak chart positions	Certifications
Year	Title	Details	NZ	Certifications
2003	Passenger	Released: 12 June 2003; Rereleased: 18 November 2003; Label: Festival Mushroom Records; Catalogue: 336182	6	NZ: Gold
2005	So Radiate	Released: 14 November 2005; Label: Festival Mushroom Records	—	
"—" denotes a recording that did not chart or was not released in that territory.

=== Singles ===
Year	Title	Peak chart positions	Album
Year	Title	NZ	Album
2002	"Alright With Me (Taking It Easy)"	10	Passenger
2002	"We Kissed"	7	Passenger
2003	"Love Will Save Me"	18	Passenger
2003	"This Is It"	12	Passenger
2006	"I See the World"	—	So Radiate
2006	"So Radiate"	—	So Radiate
2007	"My Satellite"	—	So Radiate
2008	"Tears" (Boh Runga & Carly Binding)	—	Non-album single
2015	"Team, Ball, Player, Thing" (#KiwisCureBatten featuring Lorde, Kimbra, Brooke Fraser, et al.)	2	Non-album single
"—" denotes a recording that did not chart or was not released in that territory.
