= Matthew Saunoa =

- Born: 1986 (age 39–40); Papatoetoe, New Zealand
- Genre: Pop
- Years active: 2006–2007
- Label: Shock

Matthew Saunoa (born 1986) is a New Zealand pop singer who rose to musical fame as the winner of the third season of New Zealand Idol in 2006. After winning the third season, his winner's single, "Hold Out" topped the New Zealand Singles Chart, however it did not secure Saunoa an album contract with Sony Music. In 2007 he appeared on Pop's Ultimate Star. He has experienced drug and alcohol addiction, and in 2023 he was imprisoned for over six years for injuring a police officer in a deliberate hit-and-run.

== Early life ==
Saunoa was born in Papatoetoe, Auckland. His mother is English and his father is Samoan. He attended De La Salle College, where he was a lead singer at school events. Before appearing on Idol, he worked as a builder in Levin. Saunoa relocated to the Gold Coast in 2009.

== New Zealand Idol ==
Saunoa unsuccessfully auditioned for the initial season of New Zealand Idol in 2004. After the birth of his first son, Saunoa tried again and was accepted onto the show.

On 17 October 2006, betting agency Centrebet announced their final-week prediction that Saunoa would win the competition, with his odds at $1.66 and runner up Indira Moala's at $2.10. However, before the finale began, the odds moved to put Moala as the favourite to win. Along with the 'New Zealand Idol' title, he won NZ$50,000 cash, a Daihatsu Terios, a holiday in Rarotonga and recording contract. Saunoa shared some of the prize money with Moala, and sold the Tarios to raise money for a deposit on a house purchase to provide security for his family.

== After NZ Idol ==
Saunoa performed his winner's single, "Hold Out", on the finale of New Zealand Idol on 29 October 2006. Written by James Reid of The Feelers, it was released for purchase by Shock Records on 31 October 2006, with a download available on 6 November. The song debuted on the New Zealand Singles Chart at number one the day of its digital release, and remained on the chart for twenty-three weeks. "Hold Out" was also used as TV One's theme tune in the summer of 2006–07. However, due to the low sales of the song, Saunoa did not secure a contract to record a studio album.

The following year, Saunoa contested the reality television show Pop's Ultimate Star, and came third, with TrueBliss singer Joe Cotton and New Zealand Idol season two runner-up Nik Carlson receiving first and second places, respectively.

As "Hold Out" was Saunoa's only solo musical release, Saunoa felt guilty for not making more of his New Zealand Idol title, and for letting his supporters down. In an interview with the Manawatu Standard in 2010, Saunoa stated, "I got to release a single, and that was it. I just felt I was left to rot. After climbing what seemed an impossible mountain it felt like I had fallen and landed flat on my face." However, in 2009, Saunoa formed a band with Lionel Nelson, formerly of Herbs, and Melaanie Viether. The group, named Brown Suga, began performing at the Gold Coast, in Australia. Of the collaboration, Saunoa said, "We work really well together and I get to do a lot of solo stuff...Being with Kiwi people and other Polynesian people, I don't know, something really clicks." Around this time, he moved to Mudgeeraba with his partner and children.

== Convictions ==
Saunoa has struggled with drug and alcohol addiction since his teenage years. In 2020, Saunoa was sentenced to 13 months' imprisonment in Australia for various drug-related and property offences. He was deported from Australia after serving his sentence.

On 18 October 2023, Saunoa was jailed in New Zealand for six years and seven months after he committed a deliberate hit-and-run and caused serious injuries to a police officer who was trying to stop him during a November 2021 car chase. Saunoa had pled guilty to aggravated grievous bodily harm, unlawfully taking a motor vehicle, burglary and other motor vehicle offences relating to the chase.
