= New Zealand Idol season 1 =

New Zealand Idol
- Season 1
- Hosted by: Dominic Bowden
- Judges: Paul Ellis; Fiona McDonald; Frankie Stevens
- Winner: Ben Lummis
- Runner-up: Michael Murphy

Release
- Original network: TVNZ
- Original release: 1 February – 10 May 2004

Season chronology
- Next → Season 2

The first season of New Zealand Idol was produced by Fremantle Media subsidiary Grundy Television in association with UK company 19TV, and was broadcast on TVNZ in the early half of 2004. The judges were Paul Ellis, Fiona McDonald and Frankie Stevens.

== Auditions ==
The auditions were held at the following locations:

- Trentham Racecourse, Trentham, Upper Hutt
- Riccarton Racecourse, Riccarton, Christchurch
- Ellerslie Racecourse, Ellerslie, Auckland

Those who were successful would proceed to the "Top 60" theatre rounds held at the Maidment Theatre in Auckland.

== Theatre Week ==
The successful contestants who made it through to the "Top 60" rounds would spend a gruelling three days at the theatre.

- Day One: Contestants, in groups of six, were to sing in turn, a cappella, a song of their own choice. At the end of the day, twelve were sent home, leaving 48 remaining.

Eliminated: Faith, Petia, Darryl, Kasanita, Ria, George, Dominic, Naomi, Charli, Hiwi, Ruth, Matthew

- Day Two: Trio performances would test the contestants' teamwork skills, with the guys performing Elvis Presley's "Suspicious Minds", while the girls would perform the Burt Bacharach classic "I Say a Little Prayer." At the end of this, the group was once more reduced by a further 12.

Eliminated: Jazmine, Conrad, Pairama, Wiremu, James, Krista, Rebekah, Daniel, Chantel, Jessica, Katherine, Clarke

- Day Three: The remaining 36 contestants have one last opportunity to impress the judges. Once again they were to perform solo, (a cappella), in front of the judges and all other remaining contestants.

Eliminated: TJ, Liam, Courtenay, Ian, Maisey, Rochelle, Akina, Toni, Rusila, Pania, Sacha, Paranihia

The decision of the final cut to the "Top 24" was delivered to three groups of twelve, with one group being sent home.

== Top 24 ==
=== Group 1 ===
- Nigel Withington – "Right Here Waiting" by Richard Marx
- Christine Hutt – "Think Twice" by Celine Dion
- Camillia Temple – "Exhale (Shoop Shoop)" by Whitney Houston
- Karly Ryder – "Not That Kind" by Anastacia
- Faaose "Oz" Aneru – "Against All Odds" by Phil Collins
- Ben Lummis – "Back at One" by Brian McKnight
- Emily Kay – "Respect" by Aretha Franklin
- Filipo Saipani – "Still" by Brian McKnight

Advancing to the Top 10: Camillia Temple, Ben Lummis and Filipo Saipani
Wildcard Contender: Nigel Withington

=== Group 2 ===
- Ngahekenga Growcott – "The Voice Within" by Christina Aguilera
- Gemma Russell – "Ain't No Mountain High Enough" by Marvin Gaye & Tammi Terrell
- Inangaro Tangianau – "Everything Is Everything" by Lauryn Hill
- Sam Cowley-Lupo – "Unchained Melody" by The Righteous Brothers
- Jessie Cassin – "Angel" by Sarah McLachlan
- Luke Whaanga – "The Greatest Love of All" by Whitney Houston
- Dave Houma – "Yesterday Once More" by The Carpenters
- Michael Murphy – "Drive" by Incubus

Advancing to the Top 10: Luke Whaanga, Dave Houma and Michael Murphy
Wildcard Contender: Jessie Cassin

=== Group 3 ===
- Alana Plews – "Come On Over" by Christina Aguilera
- Robin Johnson – "Ribbon in the Sky" by Stevie Wonder
- Amanda Boyce – "Because You Loved Me" by Celine Dion
- Lee Fidow – "Incomplete" by Sisqó
- Lemuel Misa – "Every Time I Close My Eyes" by Babyface / Backstreet Boys
- Sela Mahe – "How Come You Don't Call Me?" by Alicia Keys
- Ariana Roberts – "You Don't Know My Name" by Alicia Keys
- Eddie Gaiger – "Drift Away" by Dobie Gray

Advancing to the Top 10: Robin Johnson, Sela Mahe and Eddie Gaiger
Wildcard Contender: Amanda Boyce

=== Wildcards ===
- Nigel Withington – "Lady in Red" by Chris de Burgh
- Jessie Cassin – "Something Good" by Bic Runga
- Amanda Boyce – "Amazing Grace"

Advancing to the Top 10: Jessie Cassin

== Weekly Song Themes ==
Date	Week	Theme	Guest Judge
14 March	Top 10	Contestant's Choice	Guy Sebastian
21 March	Top 9	Homegrown	Annie Crummer
28 March	Top 8	Disco	none
4 April	Top 7	Ballads	Nathan King
11 April	Top 6	British Invasion	Ian "Dicko" Dickson
18 April	Top 5	Soul	Peter Urlich
25 April	Top 4	Rock	Karyn Hay
3 May	Top 3	The '80's	Lucy Lawless

== The Top 10 Contestants ==
=== Ben Lummis ===
Ben Lummis (born 1 June 1978 in Wellington) was the winner of the first series of New Zealand Idol.

Audition: "Back at One" by Brian McKnight
Theatre Week (Round 1): "I Believe I Can Fly" by R. Kelly
Theatre Week (Round 3): "The Day" by Babyface
Top 24: "Back at One" by Brian McKnight
Top 10: "Never Too Much" by Luther Vandross
Top 9: "Oughta Be in Love" by Dave Dobbyn
Top 8: "Hang On in There Baby" by Johnny Bristol
Top 7: "I Can Love You Like That" by All-4-One
Top 6: "Kiss from a Rose" by Seal
Top 5: "Treat Her Like a Lady" by The Temptations
Top 4: "American Woman" by Lenny Kravitz, "Livin' on a Prayer" by Bon Jovi
Top 3: "The Power of Love" by Huey Lewis and the News, "Rhythm of the Night" by DeBarge
Top 2: "Kiss from a Rose" by Seal, "Livin' on a Prayer" by Bon Jovi, "I Believe I Can Fly" by R. Kelly, "They Can't Take That Away" (Winner's single)

=== Michael Murphy ===
Michael Murphy (born 4 September 1986 in Taupō), was runner-up to winner Ben Lummis.

Audition: "Don't Dream It's Over" by Crowded House
Theatre Week (Round 1): "Drive" by Incubus
Theatre Week (Round 3): "Better Be Home Soon" by Crowded House
Top 24: "Drive" by Incubus
Top 10: "Here Without You" by 3 Doors Down
Top 9: "Better Be Home Soon" by Crowded House
Top 8: "Play That Funky Music" by Wild Cherry
Top 7: "Tears in Heaven" by Eric Clapton
Top 6: "Let Me Entertain You" by Robbie Williams
Top 5: "(Sittin' On) The Dock of the Bay" by Otis Redding
Top 4: "Rock and Roll" by Led Zeppelin, "Wherever You Will Go" by The Calling
Top 3: "Should I Stay or Should I Go" by The Clash, "Angel of Harlem" by U2
Top 2: "Let Me Entertain You" by Robbie Williams, "Tears in Heaven" by Eric Clapton, "One" by U2, "They Can't Take That Away" (Winner's single)

=== Camillia Temple ===
Camillia Temple (aged 28, from Hamilton), was the last contestant sent home.

Audition: "My Love Is Your Love" by Whitney Houston
Theatre Week (Round 1): "How Come You Don't Call Me?" by Alicia Keys
Theatre Week (Round 3): "Bohemian Rhapsody" by Queen
Top 24: "Exhale (Shoop Shoop)" by Whitney Houston
Top 10: "Natural Woman" by Aretha Franklin
Top 9: "Escaping" by Margaret Urlich
Top 8: "Lady Marmalade" by Labelle
Top 7: "Purple Rain" by Prince
Top 6: "Superstar" by Jamelia
Top 5: "Piece of My Heart" by Janis Joplin
Top 4: "Alone" by Heart, "Black Velvet" by Alannah Myles
Top 3: "I Want to Know What Love Is" by Foreigner, "How Will I Know" by Whitney Houston

=== Luke Whaanga ===
Luke Whaanga, (aged 20, from Lower Hutt), was the seventh contestant sent home.

Audition: "I Love Every Little Thing About You" by Stevie Wonder
Theatre Week (Round 1): "A Whole New World" by Peabo Bryson and Regina Belle
Theatre Week (Round 3): "If I Had No Loot" by Tony! Toni! Toné!
Top 24: "The Greatest Love of All" by Whitney Houston
Top 10: "Slippin' Away" by Max Merritt
Top 9: "Sitting Inside My Head" by Supergroove
Top 8: "You to Me Are Everything" by The Real Thing
Top 7: "When A Man Loves A Woman" by Percy Sledge
Top 6: "Come Together" by The Beatles
Top 5: "Shining Star" by The Manhattans
Top 4: "Behind Blue Eyes" by Limp Bizkit, "You Shook Me All Night Long" by AC/DC

=== Dave Houma ===
David "Dave" Houma (aged 28, from Auckland), was the sixth contestant sent home.

Audition: "Yesterday Once More" by The Carpenters
Theatre Week (Round 1): "Hard to Say I'm Sorry" by Chicago
Theatre Week (Round 3): "Love X Love" by George Benson
Top 24: "Yesterday Once More" by The Carpenters
Top 10: "Hard to Find Her" by Zed
Top 9: "Better" by Brooke Fraser
Top 8: "Give Me the Night" by George Benson
Top 7: "Truly" by Lionel Richie
Top 6: "Empty Garden (Hey Hey Johnny)" by Elton John
Top 5: "Reach Out (I'll Be There)" by The Four Tops

=== Eddie Gaiger ===
Edward "Eddie" Gaiger (aged 25, from the Coromandel), was the fifth contestant sent home.

Audition: "Don't Dream It's Over" by Crowded House
Theatre Week (Round 1): "Oughta Be in Love" by Dave Dobbyn
Theatre Week (Round 3): "Burn for You" by John Farnham
Top 24: "Drift Away" by Dobie Gray
Top 10: "One Last Breath" by Creed
Top 9: "Misty Frequencies" by Che Fu
Top 8: "Superstition" by Stevie Wonder
Top 7: "Against All Odds" by Phil Collins
Top 6: "Somebody To Love" by Queen

=== Robin Johnson ===
Robin Johnson (aged 18, from Upper Hutt), was the fourth contestant sent home.

Audition: "Man of the Hour" by John Farnham
Theatre Week (Round 1): "Ain't Too Proud to Beg" by The Temptations
Theatre Week (Round 3): "Kiss" by Prince
Top 24: "Ribbon in the Sky" by Stevie Wonder
Top 10: "Cry Me A River" by Justin Timberlake
Top 9: "Don't Dream It's Over" by Crowded House
Top 8: "Blame It on the Boogie" by The Jackson 5
Top 7: "I'll Be There" by Mariah Carey

=== Jessie Cassin ===
Jessica "Jessie" Cassin (aged 18, from Browns Bay, Auckland), was the third contestant sent home. Prior to Idol, Jessie was completing a Bachelor of Music, majoring in Performance Music – Classical.

Audition: "Drive" by Bic Runga
Theatre Week (Round 1): "Songbird" by Eva Cassidy
Theatre Week (Round 3): "The Greatest Love of All" by Whitney Houston
Top 24: "Angel" by Sarah McLachlan
Wildcards: "Something Good" by Bic Runga
Top 10: "Something Good" by Bic Runga
Top 9: "I Hope I Never" by Split Enz
Top 8: "Dancing Queen" by Abba

=== Sela Mahe ===
Sela Mahe (aged 17, from Māngere, Auckland), was the second contestant sent home. She is of Tongan descent.

Audition: "It's Only a Paper Moon" by Natalie Cole
Theatre Week (Round 1):
Theatre Week (Round 3): "It's Only a Paper Moon" by Natalie Cole
Top 24: "How Come You Don't Call Me?" by Alicia Keys
Top 10: "Gettin' In The Way" by Jill Scott
Top 9: "Time Makes A Wine" by Ardijah

=== Filipo Saipani ===
Filipo Saipani (aged 18, from Wellington), was the first contestant sent home.

Audition: "God Defend New Zealand"
Theatre Week (Round 1): "Whenever You Call" by Brian McKnight
Theatre Week (Round 3): "I'll Be There" by The Jackson 5
Top 24: "Still" by Brian McKnight
Top 10: "Whenever You Call" by Brian McKnight

== The Grand Final ==
The final was held on 10 May, with the following performances:

- The Top 10: "Kids" by Robbie Williams and Kylie Minogue
- Luke Whaanga: "Sitting Inside My Head" by Supergroove
- Ben Lummis: "They Can't Take That Away" (winner's single)
- Eddie Gaiger: "Somebody To Love" by Queen
- Camillia Temple: "Purple Rain" by Prince
- Michael Murphy: "They Can't Take That Away" (winner's single)
- Jessie Cassin: "Drive" by Bic Runga
- Fiona McDonald & Frankie Stevens: "Somethin' Stupid" by Frank Sinatra and Nancy Sinatra
- Robin Johnson: "Cry Me A River" by Justin Timberlake
- Filipo Saipani: "Whenever You Call" by Brian McKnight
- Sela Mahe: "How Come You Don't Call Me?" by Alicia Keys
- Michael Murphy: "Wherever You Will Go" by The Calling
- Ben Lummis: "American Woman" by Lenny Kravitz
- Dave Houma: "Empty Garden (Hey Hey Johnny)" by Elton John
- Ben Lummis: "They Can't Take That Away"

== Elimination chart ==
Legend
Did Not Perform	Top 24	Wild Card	Top 10

Stage:		Semi-Finals			WC	Finals								
Week:		23/2	1/3	8/3	13/3	15/3	22/3	29/3	5/4	12/4	19/4	26/4	3/5	10/5
Place	Contestant	Result												
1	Ben Lummis	Top 10				Btm 3		Btm 3	Btm 3					Winner
2	Michael Murphy		Top 10											Runner-up
3	Camillia Temple	Top 10									Btm 2	Btm 2	Elim	
4	Luke Whaanga		Top 10							Btm 2		Elim		
5	Dave Houma		Top 10							Btm 3	Elim			
6	Eddie Gaiger			Top 10		Btm 2		Btm 2	Btm 2	Elim				
7	Robin Johnson			Top 10			Btm 2		Elim					
8	Jessie Cassin		Elim		Top 10		Btm 3	Elim						
9	Sela Mahe			Top 10			Elim							
10	Filipo Saipani	Top 10				Elim								
Wild; Card	Nigel Worthington	Elim			Elim									
Wild; Card	Amanda Boyce			Elim	Elim									
Semi- Final; 3	Lee Fidow			Elim										
Semi- Final; 3	Lemuel Misa			Elim										
Semi- Final; 3	Alana Plews			Elim										
Semi- Final; 3	Ariana Roberts			Elim										
Semi- Final; 2	Sam Cowley-Lupo		Elim											
Semi- Final; 2	Ngahekenga Growcott		Elim											
Semi- Final; 2	Gemma Russell		Elim											
Semi- Final; 2	Inangaro Tangianau		Elim											
Semi- Final; 1	Faaose "Oz" Aneru	Elim												
Semi- Final; 1	Christine Hutt	Elim												
Semi- Final; 1	Emily Kay	Elim												
Semi- Final; 1	Karly Ryder	Elim												
