= One Road =

Studio album by Ben Lummis
- Released: 16 June 2004
- Recorded: May–June 2004
- Genre: R&B/Pop
- Label: BMG New Zealand
- Producer: Paul Ellis

Singles from One Road
- 1. "They Can't Take That Away" Released: 10 May 2004

One Road is the debut album by first-season New Zealand Idol winner Ben Lummis, released in New Zealand on 16 June 2004. It was rapidly recorded in 15 days and released only a month after Lummis' victory on the show, and is his only studio album to date.

One Road was a commercial success, debuting at number 1 on the New Zealand music charts where it remained for two weeks. The album was certified 3× platinum. The single "They Can't Take That Away" also topped the charts and became the best-selling single in 2004, breaking records for most units sold in a week.

Lummis abruptly left Sony BMG a year after the albums release. The decision was reportedly mutual, although some commentators speculated on the cause, noting that the album had been a commercial success.

== Background ==
Lummis was the winner of New Zealand Idol in 2004. Following his victory, Lummis signed a recording contract with Sony BMG and released his debut single "They Can't Take That Away", which debuted at number one on the New Zealand Singles Chart. Lummis completed a nationwide New Zealand Idol Live! tour with his fellow finalists.

One Road was recorded in 15 days and released just 4 weeks after winning the show. The rushed production process raised subsequent criticism against New Zealand Idol and Sony BMG. Paul Ellis, then Lummis' manager and a judge on New Zealand Idol, produced the album but publicly slated his own production work as "crap" and the "worst-sounding album" of his career due to the limited time he had to work on it. Former contestants Michael Murphy and Rosita Vai also criticised the speed of the process.

A year after the album was released, Lummis abruptly left Sony BMG, despite the commercial success of the album. Ellis and Lummis stated it was a "mutual decision" with the label. Sony BMG would later pull out of involvement with New Zealand Idol and its contestants altogether. Regan Cunliffe, a blogger for Idolblog, speculated that Lummis' focus on religious media activities may have caused issues behind the scenes, writing "I don't think Ben's choice to spend the majority of his time preaching to the converted was a wise decision. [.... ] The people of New Zealand gave him a title and he seems to have ignored them and focused on singing and speaking in churches."

Lummis did not follow with a second album, and his music career stalled. In 2022, comedian James Mustapic interviewed Lummis in his TV series Abandonment Issues. Lummis revealed he was still interested in music but had pursued a career in the fitness industry instead.

== Commercial performance ==
One Road debuted on the official New Zealand albums chart at number 1 and held the position for two consecutive weeks. It sold over 45,000 copies and has been certified 3× platinum by the RIANZ.

"They Can't Take That Away" was the only single released from the album on 10 May 2004, shortly after he won New Zealand Idol. It debuted at number 1 on the official New Zealand singles chart, a position that it held for several weeks. The single was certified 4× platinum by the RIANZ with over 40,000 copies sold. It was 2004's number-one single in New Zealand, breaking records by selling nearly 12,000 copies in a week. It held this record for eight years until it was overtaken by Flight of the Conchords' 2012 charity single "Feel Inside (And Stuff Like That)".

== Critical reception ==
Professional ratings
Review scores
Source	Rating
The New Zealand Herald	2/5 stars

One Road was met with mixed reviews by critics. Rebecca Barry of The New Zealand Herald described the album as a "slick, formulaic effort chocka with syrupy love songs and inspirational themes so broad they could be about his Idol win or his best friend's neighbour's new puppy". A review for Stuff described Lummis as an "underdog" but panned the album's rushed production process as "cheap and tinny".

== Track listing ==
No.	Title	Length
1.	"I Love You Love Me"	3:45
2.	"One More Time (With Feeling)"	2:57
3.	"They Can't Take That Away"	3:56
4.	"Fool for Love"	3:29
5.	"Easier To Leave"	3:47
6.	"Its All Good"	3:49
7.	"Searchin'"	3:48
8.	"Alright With Me"	3:33
9.	"Not Like This"	4:15
10.	"Never Say I Love you"	4:38
11.	"Only One Road"	4:39
12.	"Kiss From A Rose"	3:02
Total length:		45:53

== Charts ==
=== Weekly charts ===
Chart (2004)	Peak position
New Zealand Albums (RMNZ)	1

=== Year-end charts ===
Chart (2004)	Position
New Zealand Albums (RMNZ)	31
