= Pop's Ultimate Star =

Pop's Ultimate Star is a TV2's reality television show which put former reality contestants against each other, most of then were former NZ Idol contestants. The show was produced by Eyeworks Touchdown, with the first prize being $50,000 and a Kia 'Rio' car. It was hosted by Dominic Bowden, and was originally scheduled to be held in the St. James Theatre in Auckland, but after damage to the theatre, the show was eventually shifted to the Bruce Mason theatre, before finally relocating to the TVNZ's Avalon studio in Wellington.

Originally, public voting occurred on the performance show on Sundays, where the eventual two contestants who had the lowest public votes were due to be in a "sing off" on Wednesdays, where the judges eliminated one contestant. After week five, TVNZ changed the format and a contestant was eliminated in the Sunday night show by the judges, after the two with the lowest number of public votes were chosen.

The judges were music industry veterans Peter Urlich from Th' Dudes, Jordan Luck from The Exponents, Harry Lyon from Hello Sailor and Kim Willoughby from When The Cat's Away. Lyon was the show's musical director, and Willoughby, the performance coach and stylist.

The show debuted on 29 May 2007. It received mainly negative reviews, ranging from the judges and song choice, lighting, singing and the most common one, the sound issue. Another controversial issue was the introduction of immunity challenges during episodes two through four.

Contestant	Placing	Status	Bottom 2
Joe Cotton	Former singer – TrueBliss	Winner	
Nik Carlson	Runner-up, NZ Idol Season two	Runner-Up	
Matthew Saunoa	Winner, NZ Idol Season three	Eliminated	
Emily Williams	Runner-up, Australian Idol and singer – Young Divas	Eliminated	Nik Carlson
David Wikaira-Paul	Former actor – Shortland Street	Eliminated	Nik Carlson
Ben Lummis	Winner, NZ Idol Season one	Eliminated	Emily Williams
Camillia Temple	3rd place, NZ Idol Season one	Eliminated	Nik Carlson
Steve Broad	3rd place, NZ Idol Season two	Eliminated	Camillia Temple
Rosita Vai	Winner, NZ Idol Season two	Eliminated	Nik Carlson
Keri Harper	Former singer – TrueBliss	Eliminated	Emily Williams
