= Alatini =

Alatini is both a surname and a given name. Notable people with the name include:

Surname:

- Megan Alatini (born 1976), South African-born New Zealand singer, actress and television personality
- Pita Alatini (born 1976), Tongan-born New Zealand rugby union player

Given name:

- Alatini Saulala (born 1967), Tongan rugby union player and coach
