= Popstars (New Zealand TV series) =

1999 New Zealand TV series

- Genre: Reality
- Created by: Jonathan Dowling; Bill Toepfer
- Presented by: Peter Urlich (1999); Kimbra (2021)
- Judges: Peter Urlich (1999); Mark Tierney (1999); Kimbra (2021-); Nathan King (2021); Vince Harder (2021)
- Narrated by: Ian Hughes (1999)
- Opening theme: "Pop Muzik" (1999)
- Country of origin: New Zealand
- Original language: English
- No. of seasons: 2
- No. of episodes: 33

Production
- Executive producer: Geoff Steven (1999)
- Producer: Jonathan Dowling (1999)
- Running time: 30 minutes (1999); 60 minutes (2021)
- Production company: Screentime

Original release
- Network: TVNZ
- Release: 20 April 1999 – present

Related
- Popstars

Popstars is a New Zealand reality documentary television show. The first edition aired on TVNZ in 1999 and showed the establishment of a five-piece girl group, TrueBliss. The series was the origin of the Popstars reality TV series format, which went on to be sold to over 50 countries. A reboot of Popstars screened in 2021.

== Format ==
Unlike the modern Idol or The X Factor television franchises — which are presented as singing contests with public votes — the original 1999 New Zealand series of Popstars was presented as a documentary. It looked at the formation of a modern pop group from the auditions through to the first released single. There was no public vote – the five group members were decided by a panel of music industry experts.

Popstars creator Jonathan Dowling licensed the series concept to production company Screentime in Australia, who then on sold it to TresorTV in Germany before taking it worldwide. The series format was sold to over 50 countries internationally.

== First Edition (1999) ==
The inaugural season of Popstars screened on TVNZ's TV2 channel in 1999 and was made up of nine half-hour episodes. The show's producers received $291,170 in funding from NZ On Air.

The format focused on the development of the five-piece girl group TrueBliss. The group's five members were Joe Cotton, Keri Harper, Erika Takacs, Carly Binding and Megan Alatini. Popstars followed TrueBliss as they recorded singles, music videos, album and embarked on a promotional tour of New Zealand.

The show also featured series creator and producer Jonathan Dowling and musician Peter Urlich.

== Second Edition (2021) ==
In April 2021, TVNZ debuted a 24 episode second season of Popstars. The show format was revamped. Unlike the original show in 1999, it was not a documentary following the formation of a girl group. Instead, the reboot focused on individual artists — both solo artists and groups of any gender, aged 16 or older, and placed its emphasis on original songwriting from the performers themselves.

The series involved a panel of three experts, headed by Kimbra, who was joined by Nathan King and Vince Harder. In the auditions phase, the singers were first assessed by vocal coaches Bella Kalolo and Jeremy Redmore.

The series screened on TVNZ 2 on Monday, Tuesday, and Wednesday nights. The first episode was also simultaneously screened on TVNZ 1.

In the end, Auckland based singer/songwriter Christabel Williams won and took home the $100,000 prize to continue her musical career.
