= New Zealand Idol season 3 =

New Zealand Idol
- Season 3
- Hosted by: Dominic Bowden
- Judges: Iain Stables; Megan Alatini; Frankie Stevens
- Winner: Matthew Saunoa
- Runner-up: Indira Moala
- Finals venue: St. James Theatre, Wellington

Release
- Original network: TVNZ
- Original release: July 2006 – 29 October 2006

Season chronology
- ← Previous; Season 2

The third season of New Zealand Idol commenced in July 2006. The judges were Iain Stables, Megan Alatini and Frankie Stevens.

== Auditions ==
The auditions were held at the following locations:

- Telstraclear Pacific Events Centre, Manukau
- Westpac Stadium, Wellington
- Addington Raceway, Addington, Christchurch

Those who were successful would proceed to the "Top 60" theatre rounds held at Sky City in Auckland.

== Theatre Week ==
The successful contestants who made it through to the "Top 60" rounds would spend three days of audition rounds at the Sky City theatre.

- Round One (Day 2): Contestants, in groups of six, were to sing in turn, a cappella, a song of their own choice. This year, the entire 58 contestants would sing before the judges decided on which 22 people would be eliminated.
- Round Two (Day 2): In a diversion away from the regular group rounds, 18 of the 37 remaining contestants would pair up for duet performances of the Elton John and Kiki Dee classic "Don't Go Breaking My Heart". Those remaining paired up to sing Maroon 5's "Sunday Morning", including a group of 3 due to the uneven numbers. At the end of this, 10 contestants were sent home.
- Round Three (Day 3): After the previous rounds, the remaining 27 contestants would have their last opportunity to impress the judges. Unlike previous years, each of the contestants were restricted to a choice of one of six songs, to perform in front of the judges and the remaining contestants, although they were accompanied by music.

- "For Once in My Life" by Stevie Wonder
- "I Don't Want to Miss a Thing" by Aerosmith
- "More Than Words" by Extreme
- "Torn" by Natalie Imbruglia
- "I Say a Little Prayer" by Burt Bacharach
- "Fallin'" by Alicia Keys

Following the final round, all remaining 27 were called on stage, to be told which nine were going home. After most of the contestants were either eliminated or told they were through, the remaining five – Toni, Lenken, Birgette, Ben and Emilie, were lastly given one more chance to sing for the 4 places left in the Top 18. The last contestant to be eliminated was Birgette, aged 21 from the Te Atatū area of West Auckland.

Eliminated: Naomi, Darren, Liana, Davinia, Tiresa, Vicki, Beau, Te Rau, Birgette

== Semi-finals ==
=== Group 1 ===
- George Gates – "Truly" by Lionel Richie
- Ashlee Fisher – "I Turn to You" by Christina Aguilera
- Lenken Isaa – "Brand New Jones" by Robin Thicke
- Alyce Burr – "Without You" by Brooke Fraser
- Clinton Randell – "Don't Let the Sun Go Down on Me" by Elton John
- Kali Kopae – "Imagine" by John Lennon

Advancing to the Top 10: Kali Kopae, Ashlee Fisher and Clinton Randell
Wildcard Contender: Lenken Isaac

=== Group 2 ===
- Wiremu Hohaia – "Oughta Be in Love" by Dave Dobbyn
- Stephen Wilton – "U Will Know" by Black Men United
- Vicki Eaton – "Last Dance" by Donna Summer
- Toni Baird – "Bathe in the River" by Hollie Smith
- Victor Sulfa – "Can We Talk" by Tevin Campbell
- Indira Moala – "Love Will Lead You Back" by Taylor Dayne

Advancing to the Top 10: Indira Moala, Victor Sulfa & Toni Baird
Wildcard Contenders: Wiremu Hohaia

=== Group 3 ===
- Matthew Saunoa – "To Love Somebody" by the Bee Gees
- Ben Hazlewood – "Move Along" by The All-American Rejects
- Aroha Robinson – "I'll Be There" by The Jackson 5
- Emilie Harwood – "It's All Coming Back to Me Now" by Celine Dion
- Cameron Clayton – "(Sittin' On) The Dock of the Bay" by Otis Redding
- Rebecca Wright – "Yesterday" by The Beatles

Advancing to the Top 10: Matt Saunoa, Aroha Robinson and Rebecca Wright
Wildcard Contender: Ben Hazlewood

=== Wildcards ===
- Ben Hazelwood – "Move Along" by The All-American Rejects
- Wiremu Hohaia – "Oughta Be in Love" by Dave Dobbyn
- Lenken Isaac – "Brand New Jones" by Robin Thicke

Advancing to the Top 10: Ben Hazelwood

== Weekly Song Themes ==
| Date | Week | Theme |
|---|---|---|
| 27 August | Top 10 | Soul |
| 3 September | Top 9 | Rock |
| 10 September | Top 8 | Country |
| 17 September | Top 7 | Elton John |
| 24 September | Top 6 | Groove |
| 1 October | Top 5 | Pop |
| 8 October | Top 4 | Homegrown |
| 15 October | Top 3 | Love Songs |
| 22 October | Top 2 | Judges' / Music Team's Choice |
| 23 October | Top 2 | The Final Showdown |

== The Top 10 Finalists ==
=== Matt Saunoa ===
Matt Saunoa (aged 21, from Levin) was the winner of the third series of "New Zealand Idol".

Audition: "My Girl" by The Temptations
Theatre Week (Round 1):
Theatre Week (Round 3): "Torn" by Natalie Imbruglia
Top 18: "To Love Somebody" by the Bee Gees
Top 10: "Living for the City" by Stevie Wonder
Top 9: "I Don't Want to Be" by Gavin DeGraw
Top 8: "Amazed" by Lonestar
Top 7: "Something About the Way You Look Tonight" by Elton John
Top 6: Try a Little Tenderness" by Otis Redding / The Commitments
Top 5: "Crazy" by Gnarls Barkley
Top 4: "Sitting Inside My Head" by Supergroove, "Welcome Home" by Dave Dobbyn
Top 3: "Let's Get It On" by Marvin Gaye, "Forever Now" by Cold Chisel
Top 2: "How Can You Mend a Broken Heart" by Bee Gees, "This Love" by Maroon 5,
The Final Showdown: "Crazy" by Gnarls Barkley, "Every Breath You Take" by The Police, "I Don't Want to Miss a Thing" by Aerosmith, "Living for the City" by Stevie Wonder

=== Indira Moala ===
Indira Moala (aged 21, from Glen Eden, Auckland), was runner-up to winner Matt Saunoa.

Audition: "Ordinary People" by John Legend
Theatre Week (Round 1):
Theatre Week (Round 3): "I Say A Little Prayer" by Burt Bacharach
Top 18: "Love Will Lead You Back" by Taylor Dayne
Top 10: "Think" by Aretha Franklin
Top 9: "You Oughta Know" by Alanis Morissette
Top 8: "Heartache Tonight" by Eagles
Top 7: "Can You Feel the Love Tonight" by Elton John
Top 6: "I'm Outta Love" by Anastacia
Top 5: "Hit Me, Baby, One More Time" by Britney Spears
Top 4: "Down Time" by Aaradhna, "Better Be Home Soon" by Crowded House
Top 3: "I Have Nothing" by Whitney Houston, "Don't Leave Me This Way" by Thelma Houston
Top 2: "Beautiful" by Christina Aguilera, "Sisters Are Doin' It for Themselves" by The Eurythmics & Aretha Franklin
The Final Showdown: "Hit Me, Baby, One More Time" by Britney Spears, "The Way You Make Me Feel" by Michael Jackson, "Open Arms" by Journey / Mariah Carey, "Think" by Aretha Franklin

=== Aroha Robinson ===
Aroha Robinson (aged 18, from Mt Maunganui, Bay of Plenty), came third.

Audition:
Theatre Week (Round 1):
Theatre Week (Round 3):
Top 18: "I'll Be There" by The Jackson 5
Top 10: "River Deep - Mountain High" by Ike & Tina Turner
Top 9: "Purple Rain" by Prince
Top 8: "From This Moment On" by Shania Twain
Top 7: "Circle of Life" by Elton John
Top 6: "I Wanna Dance with Somebody" by Whitney Houston
Top 5: "That Don't Impress Me Much" by Shania Twain
Top 4: "Watchin' U" by Ardijah, "Lifeline" by Brooke Fraser
Top 3: "Dance with My Father" by Luther Vandross, "Let's Stay Together" by Al Green

=== Ben Hazlewood ===
Ben Hazlewood (aged 17, from Papakowhai, Wellington), was placed fourth.

Audition: "Fall at Your Feet" by Crowded House
Theatre Week (Round 1): "Sugar, We're Goin Down" by Fall Out Boy
Theatre Week (Round 3): "If You're Not the One" by Daniel Bedingfield
Top 18: "Move Along" by The All-American Rejects
Wildcard: "Move Along" by The All-American Rejects
Top 10: "Ain't No Mountain High Enough" by The Temptations
Top 9: "Start Me Up" by The Rolling Stones
Top 8: "Take It Easy" by The Eagles
Top 7: "Saturday Night's Alright for Fighting" by Elton John
Top 6: "Like I Love You" by Justin Timberlake
Top 5: "For You I Will" by Teddy Geiger
Top 4: "Fall at Your Feet" by Crowded House, "Running" by Evermore

=== Kali Kopae ===
Kali Kopae (aged 21, from Christchurch), finished in fifth place.

Audition: "When I Fall in Love" by Nat King Cole
Theatre Week (Round 1): "Summertime" by Ella Fitzgerald
Theatre Week (Round 3):
Top 18: "Imagine" by John Lennon
Top 10: "Proud Mary" by Creedence Clearwater Revival / Tina Turner
Top 9: "Violent" by Stellar*
Top 8: "This One's for the Girls" by Martina McBride
Top 7: "I Guess That's Why They Call It the Blues" by Elton John
Top 6: "Sway" by Michael Bublé
Top 5: "Soak Up the Sun" by Sheryl Crow

=== Toni Baird ===
Toni Baird (aged 29, from Upper Hutt), was placed sixth.

Audition: "Stop!" by Sam Brown
Theatre Week (Round 1): "Black Velvet" by Alannah Myles
Theatre Week (Round 3): "Torn" by Natalie Imbruglia, "Stop!" by Sam Brown
Top 18: "Bathe in the River" by Hollie Smith
Top 10: "When Something Is Wrong with My Baby" by Sam & Dave / Jimmy Barnes
Top 9: "Edge of Seventeen" by Stevie Nicks
Top 8: "Jolene" by Dolly Parton
Top 7: "Your Song" by Elton John
Top 6: "Sweet Child o' Mine" by Guns N' Roses

=== Rebecca Wright ===
Rebecca Wright (aged 24, from Mt Albert, Auckland), finished in seventh place.

Audition: "Because of You" by Kelly Clarkson
Theatre Week (Round 1): "Black Horse and the Cherry Tree" by KT Tunstall
Theatre Week (Round 3): "Torn" by Natalie Imbruglia
Top 18: "Yesterday" by The Beatles
Top 10: "Lady Marmalade" by Labelle
Top 9: "Piece of My Heart" by Janis Joplin
Top 8: "How Do I Live" by LeAnn Rimes
Top 7: "Goodbye Yellow Brick Road" by Elton John

=== Clinton Randell ===
Clinton Randell (aged 20, from Mt Roskill, Auckland), placed eighth. He hosted The Edge Breakfast in the 2010s and 2020s.

Audition: "Somewhere Over the Rainbow" by Judy Garland
Theatre Week (Round 1):
Theatre Week (Round 3): "I Don't Want to Miss a Thing" by Aerosmith
Top 18: "Don't Let the Sun Go Down on Me" by Elton John
Top 10: "Superstition" by Stevie Wonder
Top 9: "Knockin' on Heaven's Door" by Bob Dylan
Top 8: "I'll Be" by Edwin McCain

=== Ashlee Fisher ===
Ashlee Fisher (aged 16, from Hamilton), finished ninth.

Audition: "Hero" by Mariah Carey
Theatre Week (Round 1): "Dance with My Father" by Luther Vandross
Theatre Week (Round 3): "Fallin'" by Alicia Keys
Top 18: "I Turn to You" by Christina Aguilera
Top 10: "Son of a Preacher Man" by Dusty Springfield
Top 9: "4ever" by The Veronicas

=== Victor Sulfa ===
Victor Sulfa (aged 19, from Papatoetoe, Auckland), was placed tenth.

Audition: "A Song for You" by Leon Russell
Theatre Week (Round 1):
Theatre Week (Round 3): "For Once in My Life" by Stevie Wonder
Top 18: "Can We Talk" by Tevin Campbell
Top 10: "Love Child" by Diana Ross & The Supremes

== The Group Performances ==
Group 1: "Kids" by Robbie Williams & Kylie Minogue, "Blame It on the Boogie" by The Jackson 5
Group 2: "Signed, Sealed, Delivered" by Stevie Wonder, "Upside Down" by Diana Ross
Group 3: "You Can't Hurry Love" by The Supremes
The Top 10: "Reach Out (I'll Be There)" by The Four Tops, "Ain't Too Proud to Beg" by The Temptations
The Top 9: "I Love Rock 'n' Roll" by Joan Jett, "I Want You to Want Me" by Cheap Trick
The Top 8: "Sweet Home Alabama" by Lynyrd Skynyrd, "The Gambler" by Kenny Rogers
The Top 7: "I'm Still Standing", "Crocodile Rock" by Elton John
The Top 6: "Hey Ya!" by Outkast,
The Top 5: "Reach" by S Club 7, "Keep on Movin'" by Five
The Top 4: "Slice of Heaven" by Dave Dobbyn, "Why Does Love Do This To Me?" The Exponents
The Top 3: "(Your Love Keeps Lifting Me) Higher and Higher" by Rita Coolidge, "Faith" by George Michael
The Top 2: "You Give Me Something" by James Morrison

== The Grand Final ==
The final was held on 29 October, with the following performances:

- "Indira Moala: "Hold Out" (Winner's single)
- "Indira Moala: "Crazy in Love" by Beyoncé Knowles & Jay-Z
- "Matt Saunoa: "Hold Out" (Winner's single)
- "Matt Saunoa: "When I Get You Alone" by Robin Thicke
- "Top 10 Girls: "It's Raining Men" by The Weather Girls / Geri Halliwell
- "Top 10 Guys: "I Heard It Through the Grapevine" by Marvin Gaye
- "Top 10: "Blame It on the Boogie" by The Jackson 5
- "Top 10: "Reach Out (I'll Be There)" by The Four Tops

== Elimination chart ==
Legend
| Did Not Perform | Top 18 | Wild Card | Top 10 |

| Stage: | | Semi-Finals | | | WC | Finals | | | | | | | | | |
| Week: | | 7/8 | 14/8 | 21/8 | 21/8 | 28/8 | 4/9 | 11/9 | 18/9 | 25/9 | 2/10 | 9/10 | 16/10 | 23/10 | 29/10 |
| Place | Contestant | Result | | | | | | | | | | | | | |
| 1 | Matt Saunoa | | | Top 10 | | | | | | | | | | | Winner |
| 2 | Indira Moala | | Top 10 | | | | | | Btm 2 | | | | | | Runner-up |
| 3 | Aroha Robinson | | | Top 10 | | | | | | | Btm 2 | Btm 2 | Elim | | |
| 4 | Ben Hazlewood | | | Elim | Top 10 | | | | | Btm 2 | | Elim | | | |
| 5 | Kali Kopae | Top 10 | | | | | Btm 2 | Btm 2 | | | Elim | | | | |
| 6 | Toni Baird | | Top 10 | | | Btm 3 | | | | Elim | | | | | |
| 7 | Rebecca Wright | | | Top 10 | | | | | Elim | | | | | | |
| 8 | Clinton Randell | Top 10 | | | | | | Elim | | | | | | | |
| 9 | Ashlee Fisher | Top 10 | | | | Btm 2 | Elim | | | | | | | | |
| 10 | Victor Sulfa | | Top 10 | | | Elim | | | | | | | | | |
| Wild; Card | Lenken Isaac | Elim | | | Elim | | | | | | | | | | |
| Wild; Card | Wiremu Hohaia | | Elim | | Elim | | | | | | | | | | |
| Semi- Final; 3 | Emilie Harwood | | | Elim | | | | | | | | | | | |
| Semi- Final; 3 | Cameron Clayton | | | Elim | | | | | | | | | | | |
| Semi- Final; 2 | Stephen Wilton | | Elim | | | | | | | | | | | | |
| Semi- Final; 2 | Vicki Eaton | | Elim | | | | | | | | | | | | |
| Semi- Final; 1 | George Gates | Elim | | | | | | | | | | | | | |
| Semi- Final; 1 | Alyce Burr | Elim | | | | | | | | | | | | | |
