= TrueBliss =

New Zealand pop girl group

- Origin: New Zealand
- Genres: Pop; teen pop
- Years active: 1999–2000; 2012
- Label: Sony BMG (1999–2000)
- Past members: Keri Harper; Joe Cotton; Megan Cassie; Carly Binding; Erika Takacs

TrueBliss were a New Zealand pop girl group formed in April 1999. The band were formed on the popular television show Popstars, which aired on TVNZ's TV2 channel for nine weeks in the search for a new girl group. TrueBliss were the first ever group to be formed under the Popstars franchise, before the concept was sold to broadcasters in Australia (who formed the group Bardot in similar style), continental Europe, United Kingdom, United States and Latin America.

== Formation ==
Five girls, Joe Cotton, Keri Harper, Erika Takacs, Carly Binding and Megan Alatini, were taken from obscurity to instant stardom overnight while enjoying commercial success with their No.1 single "Tonight". TrueBliss were managed by Jonathan Dowling, and briefly by Simon Grigg, although on TV they were portrayed as being managed by Peter Urlich, and enjoyed three single releases with label Columbia, an imprint of Sony Music.

The girls signed sponsorship deals with Pepsi and Burger King before embarking on the 'Number One Tour' across 17 towns nationwide. Demand for tickets to the shows was so strong that matinee performances were put on in most venues.

"Number One" was the follow-up to "Tonight", achieving a #12 position on the New Zealand charts. In September 1999 a cover of the George Michael penned "Freedom" was released but failed to chart. Columbia discussed a follow-up album to the platinum 11-track debut Dream in 1999, but it was never recorded. The planned first single 'We Kissed' was written by Carly Binding who then left the band in early 2000 citing personal differences. She has since gone on to record a string of hits - including releasing the aforementioned "We Kissed" as a solo single.

== Post TrueBliss ==
South African-born Megan Cassie later married All Black Pita Alatini. She also opened a hair braiding shop in Dunedin she ran herself. In July 2006 Megan Alatini reappeared on screens in NZ Idol as the new female judge along with Iain Stables and Frankie Stevens. She also played Java in Cloud 9's The Tribe along with her two sisters Monique Cassie and Meryl Cassie and Atlantis High by the same production company where she played Dr. Legges. Megan and her sisters recorded music for the shows including the opening and closing songs to The Tribe. Megan also competed on the third season of New Zealand's Dancing with the Stars finishing a controversial second place. Post DWTS the sisters formed a band called Nubian Angelz (Dark Angels) performing at private functions and events with the hope of recording some new music. She has appeared as a celebrity guest on many shows and is passionate about her Charity work. Megan is currently in Japan with her family.

Carly Binding has had the most successful career afterwards scoring six top 40 hits and a gold-selling album Passenger as well as donating her hit song "This Is It" to the New Zealand AIDS Foundation's 'Love Is...' campaign. Her most recent album to date So Radiate was released on 3 July 2006.

Joe Cotton was the winner of Pop's Ultimate Star in 2007. The show showcased winners of various Kiwi singing contests over recent years. Her other screen work included hosting TV2's Thursday-Saturday M2 show (a graveyard shift alternative music programme). Joe left M2 (when it was cancelled in February 2003) and after appearing on Celebrity Treasure Island became a fill-in host on the C4 music channel show Select Live. She has recently appeared on the shows The Great New Zealand Spelling Bee, Pop Goes The Weasel and Celebrity Joker Poker. After hosting her own show on the New Zealand radio station The Edge she went on to be co-host on More FM Auckland's breakfast show and was then moved to host the evening show. She then co-hosted breakfast on More FM in Invercargill, before leaving radio entirely in late 2023. She was also the vocal coach for Boyband and did backing vocals on their b-side "Pour Some Sugar On Me" from their chart-topping single "You Really Got Me".

Erika Takacs hosted the weekly Coke RTR Top 20 show which ran on TV2 from 2000 to 2003, appeared on commercials for the chain store Video Ezy and appeared on celebrity shows. She was signed to Sony for a single "Do It" which remains unreleased.

Keri Harper kept the lowest profile post-TrueBliss; although a song called 'Atmosphere' was produced by Che Fu, it has never been released. She has also had cameos in the finale song of the 2002 "Coca Cola Christmas in the Park" (Auckland performance) and, in 2005, in the series final of the charitable show So You Wanna Be A Popstar? with all other True Bliss members except Binding. Keri has continued with theatre work including a stint with Michael Barrymore in Joseph And The Amazing Technicolour Dreamcoat. In 2007 Keri competed in Pop's Ultimate Star, but was the first contestant to be eliminated.

== Reformation ==
In 2012 Megan Alatini, Joe Cotton, Keri Harper and Erica Takacs reformed the group to sing and release a single for the New Zealand Child Cancer Foundation. The song was performed live at a Northern Mystics versus NSW Swifts netball game. The single "A Minute of One Day" was released via iTunes on 20 July 2012 with all proceeds going to the Children's Cancer Foundation. Carly Binding, was in a relationship with former Kiwi league player Matthew Ridge. In November 2010, the couple had a son, London Luca Ridge. The couple separated in 2014 and Binding confirmed the split in February 2015 with Matthew Ridge. Carly Binding was not part of the reformed band.

== Discography ==
=== Album ===
Year	Title	Details	Peak chart positions	Certifications
Year	Title	Details	NZ	Certifications
1999	Dream	Label: Columbia; Catalogue: 494809 2	1	NZ: 2× Platinum

=== Singles ===
Year	Title	Peak chart positions	Album
Year	Title	NZ	Album
1999	"Tonight"	1	Dream
1999	"Number One"	12	Dream
2000	"Freedom"	—	Dream
2012	"A Minute of One Day"	—	Non-album single
"—" denotes a recording that did not chart or was not released in that territory.
