= Shake 30 Countdown =

The Coke Shake 30 Countdown was a radio show played in syndication across independently owned radio stations in New Zealand (and some ZM stations) during the early to mid 1990s. Typically the countdown was pre-recorded during the week and played at various times on each individual station during the weekend. Countdown data was taken from request and votes for local countdown shows during the week on each station as well as airplay and this information put together made up the hottest 30 songs for the week on New Zealand radio. At the end of every year a Best Of show was produced playing the 30 best songs for the entire year, based on chart information taken from the previous years Top 30 countdowns.

Originally the Shake 30 Countdown was hosted by Robert Scott but in 1993 the show was taken over by Robert Rakete, today both announcers work on Auckland's The Breeze. An extra to the show was a short segment by The Filth Man, this was the latest Hollywood gossip.

In 1995 The Coke Shake 30 Countdown became the Power Jam Countdown, the format was slightly changed but still remained the similar Top 30 Countdown. The Power Jam Countdown ceased in around 1998, this was due to many stations networking across the country and offering similar countdowns. Stables Fat 40 Countdown which played on The Edge FM was syndicated to radio stations around New Zealand in regions where The Edge did not broadcast after The Power Jam Countdown ended. Today The Edge still operate The Fresh 40 Countdown across The Edge Network.
