= Homegrown (New Zealand Idol album) =

Compilation album by Various artists
- Released: April 2004
- Recorded: 2004
- Genre: Pop
- Length: 41 mins

Homegrown is the New Zealand compilation album released in 2004 by the Final 10 of NZ Idol.

== Track listing ==
1. "Yesterday Was Just the Beginning of My Life" - The Final 10
2. "Sitting Inside My Head" - Luke Whaanga
3. "Better" - Dave Houma
4. "Better Be Home Soon" - Michael Murphy
5. "Escaping" - Camillia Temple
6. "A Life with You" - Filipo Saipani
7. "Misty Frequencies" - Eddie Gaiger
8. "I Hope I Never" - Jessie Cassin
9. "You Oughta Be in Love" - Ben Lummis
10. "Time Makes the Wine" - Sela Mahe
11. "Don't Dream It's Over" - Robin Johnson

== Charts ==
Chart (2004)	Peak position
New Zealand (Official New Zealand Music Chart)	3
