= Boyband (band) =

New Zealand musical group

- Origin: New Zealand
- Genre: Pop
- Years active: 2006
- Label: WEA
- Members: Jay Coote; Rob Arnold; Gerard Clark; Pieter T Chris Murray

Boyband was a short-lived New Zealand pop vocal group created in September 2006 from the winners of The Edge radio station's promotion to manufacture New Zealand's own boy band. The Edge Radio station hosted auditions across the New Zealand to find the best males for the band. Filling the five stereotype roles were Rob Arnold (Gay Boy) from Wellington, Gerard Clark (Bad Boy) from Auckland, Jay Coote (Fat Boy) from Bluff, Chris Murray (Mummy's Boy) from Whakatane and Pieter T (Hot Boy) from Hamilton.

== Formation ==
Over the course of a few weeks starting in September 2006, New Zealand radio station The Edge began a nationwide search to find five guys to front what they claimed to be New Zealand's first manufactured novelty boyband, with the aim of taking them to the top of the New Zealand music charts. Contestants' auditions were broadcast over the radio and there were five roles created: hot boy, fat boy, bad boy, mummy's boy and gay boy. Two finalists in each category were picked and sent to "boyband camp". At the end of the week public voting for the guys opened.

== "You Really Got Me" ==
The Kinks' classic "You Really Got Me" was chosen as the first single and was recorded in two days with vocal coaching provided by former TrueBliss-star Joe Cotton. The single was backed with a cover of Def Leppard's "Pour Some Sugar On Me". The song made an immediate impact on radio, being the eighth most-added song to radio on the week of release. The boys then embarked on an intense two-week nationwide publicity tour stretching from Fat Boy's hometown of Bluff to Whangārei and on the week ending 8 October 2006 they debuted at #1 on the New Zealand music charts, knocking Fergie's "London Bridge" from number one.

Boyband followed the release of their single with performances at the Waikato vs Otago NPC semi-final rugby game in Hamilton and performing at the 2006 New Zealand Music Awards. While it was announced that their performance at the New Zealand Music Awards would be their final performance together, they have since performed at the launch of OK! magazine's New Zealand edition and headlined Auckland's Big Gay Out in February and the Wellington Gay and Lesbian Fair in March and its accompanying afterparty alongside The Glamazons. Further plans to record are unknown at this stage.

At the 2007 Vodafone New Zealand Music Awards on 19 October 2007, Boyband placed second in the category of Highest Selling New Zealand Single for "You Really Got Me".

== Discography ==
Year	Single	Album	NZ Singles Chart	Certification
2006	"You Really Got Me"		#1 (NZ)	-

== Trivia ==
- Rob Arnold (Gay Boy) had featured in all three seasons of NZ Idol but had never progressed past the top 60, however he was a finalist in the TV show Showstoppers as well as featuring on the short-lived Ultimate Challenge, and had previously done modelling work. He was also crowned Queer Idol at the 2005 Queer Idol competition as part of Wellington's gay pride week celebrations.
- Former TrueBliss singer and The Edge FM daytime host Joe Cotton was the group's vocal coach and contributes un-credited back-up vocals to the b-side "Pour Some Sugar On Me".
- Jay Coote (Fat Boy) was crowned New Zealand's King of Dad Dancing by winning Seven Sharp's Dad Dance competition during Lockdown April, 2020.
- Pieter Tuhoro (Hot Boy) has so far been the only member to continue pursuing a music career, Tuhoro is now an R&B singer known as Pieter T.
