= Passenger (Carly Binding album) =

Debut studio album by New Zealand singer-songwriter Carly Binding

Studio album by Carly Binding
- Released: 29 June 2003
- Venue: Helen Young Studios
- Genre: Pop
- Length: 39:18
- Label: Festival Records (NZ) Ltd
- Producer: Andrew Maclaren, Chris van de Geer

Carly Binding chronology
Passenger (2003)	So Radiate (2005)

Singles from Passenger
- 1. "Alright With Me (Taking It Easy)" Released: 14 July 2002; 2. "We Kissed" Released: 22 December 2002; 3. "Love Will Save Me" Released: 18 May 2003; 4. "This Is It" Released: 28 September 2003

Passenger is the debut studio album by New Zealand singer-songwriter Carly Binding. It was released on 29 June 2003 in New Zealand. The album was also released in Australia and received high rotation radio play for the single 'Alright With Me (Taking It Easy)' and 'We Kissed'.

A Special Edition version of the album was released on October 27, 2003, containing acoustic covers, a remix of 'This Is It' and one additional track.

== Background ==
The album was written by Binding and produced with Stellar's Andrew Maclaren and Chris van de Geer, with a number of tracks mixed in Los Angeles by Chris Lord-Alge. It was recorded at Helen Young Studios, mixed at York Street Studios and mastered at Studios 301, Sydney.

== Reception ==
=== Critical reception ===
Russell Baillie from New Zealand Herald gave a 4 star review, citing "It is pop — but its 10 songs are solid, thoughtful, guitar-powered, sometimes bittersweet things brought to life with confident arrangements and hooks of the non-annoying variety.". Stuff.co.nz wrote "...a highly polished collection of 10 kiwi pop tracks oozing with warmth and emotion." and gave 4 stars.

=== Commercial performance ===
Passenger debuted at No.6 on the New Zealand Albums Chart on 29 June 2003, charting for 17 weeks.

The album also went Gold in New Zealand, selling over 7,500 units within the first month of release.

== Singles ==
The album's first track "Alright With Me (Taking It Easy)" was released in July 2002 and debuted at No.30 and peaked at No.10 in week 7 on the New Zealand Singles Chart.

Second single "We Kissed", released December 2002, gave Binding a career peak of No.7 and spending 20 weeks on the chart.

Third single "Love Will Save Me" was released in May 2003 ahead of the album and peaked at No.18 and the fourth and final single, "This Is It", released in September 2003 peaked at No.12.

== Track listing ==
No.	Title	Writer(s)	Length
1.	"Alright With Me (Taking It Easy)"	Carly Binding, Boh Runga	3:53
2.	"Love Will Save Me"	Binding, Barry Palmer	3:43
3.	"This Is It"	Binding, Andrew Maclaren	3:29
4.	"Unable Too"	Binding	3:58
5.	"We Kissed"	Binding	3:29
6.	"Let It Slide"	Binding	3:45
7.	"Rescue Me"	Binding	3:49
8.	"For What It's Worth"	Binding	4:04
9.	"Not That Cold"	Binding	3:30
10.	"My Liberty"	Binding	4:41
Total length:			39:18

Special Edition
No.	Title	Length
12.	"A Day Like This (Acoustic)"	3:18
13.	"Alright With Me (Acoustic)"	4:03
14.	"We Kissed (A Kiss Is Just A Kiss)"	3:33
15.	"This Is It (Crazy Baby Mix)"	4:17
16.	"Boys Won't Change"	3:31
17.	"For What It's Worth (Acoustic)"	3:55

== Charts ==
Chart (2003)	Peak position
New Zealand Albums (RMNZ)	6
