= Teresa Bergman =

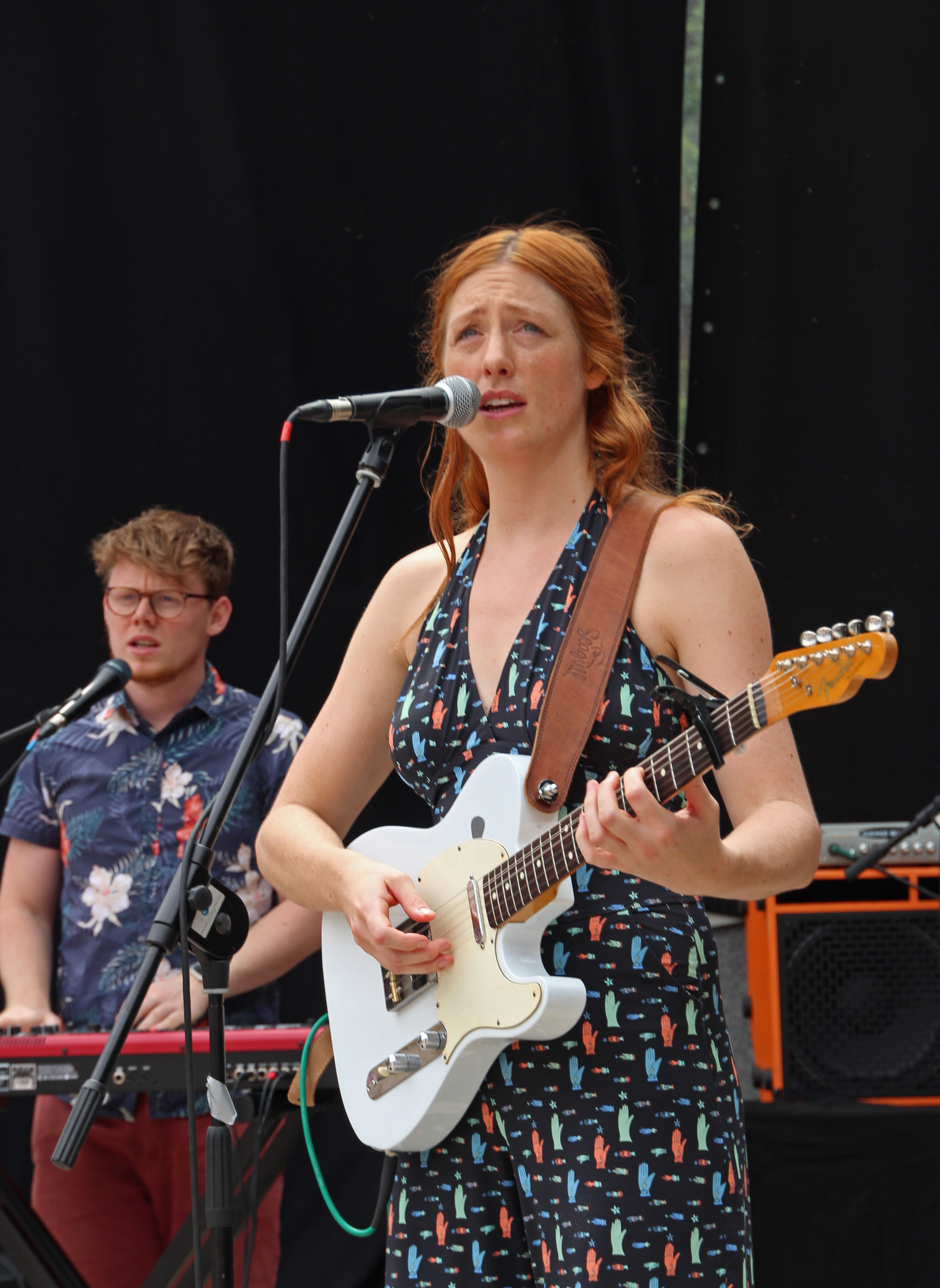
- At the 23rd Jazztage, Idar-Oberstein, Germany, June 2018.

Background information
- Born: Teresa Anne Bergman; 1986 (age 39–40); Lower Hutt, Wellington, New Zealand
- Genres: Indie pop; funk; jazz
- Occupation: Musician
- Instruments: Vocals; guitar; acoustic guitar
- Years active: 2000–present
- Labels: Musszo; Jazzhaus
- Website: teresabergman.com

Teresa Anne Bergman (born 1986) is a New Zealand-born singer-songwriter-guitarist based in Berlin since 2009. She finished fifth on New Zealand Idol in 2005. Bergman has released three studio albums, Bird of a Feather (2014), Apart (2019) and 33, Single and Broke (2022).

== Biography ==
Teresa Anne Bergman was born in Lower Hutt and grew up in neighbouring Wellington with two siblings. While a student at Chilton Saint James School she was taught by her father, Les, and was recorded on a CD, Take Note (1997), which included fellow students performing. She was a busker on the streets of Wellington and sang in a barbershop quartet from the age of 14. In 2004 she was the dux in her final year of secondary school at Sacred Heart College, where her mother, Judith, was a mathematics teacher. Also in that year she finished in the top 20 for the Play It Strange secondary schools songwriting competition with her track, "There You Go", which was recorded for the related CD.

From July to September 2005 Bergman was a contestant on the second season of New Zealand Idol. She originally missed out on a place in the Final 10 but was brought back for the Wildcard Special and received the last position into the finals and was eliminated after reaching the top 5. She graduated from Victoria University of Wellington with a Bachelor of Arts in anthropology and German language in 2007.

In 2008 she travelled to Breslau, Poland to study social sciences, then moved to Leipzig, Germany and has been based in Berlin, initially as a busker, from 2009. In October 2011 she issued a self-titled six-trsck extended play via local label, Musszo Records. Zitty (a Berlin magazine) journalist Joe Metzroff rated her as the best busker in the city in 2012. He described, "her crystal clear voice" as she presented "her songs [which] are self-written, full of soul, without being tearful."

Bergman released her debut studio album, Bird of a Feather, in November 2014 via Musszo Records. She returned to Wellington in December to promote the album. In the following month she travelled to Melbourne to busk and perform shows, and then went back to Berlin. Sirens of Stage's writer described how she "has created an eclectic stylistic fusion of acoustic-folk, funk and jazz... From soaring heights to soul dripping depths, the dynamism of [her] music and live performances is infectious."

Her second album, Apart, was issued in September 2019 via Jazzhaus Records. It was co-produced with Sebastian Adam; while her backing band both in the studio and on tour were Pier Ciaccio on drums, Tobias Kabiersch on bass guitar and Matt Paull on keyboards. Herbert of We Got Music observed, "[it] is extremely complex and very groovy, a pop-soul album at its best. After just a few bars, the listener realizes: A fantastic singer and composer is at work here - with good songwriting, a good dose of soul, lots of energy and her own personality and charisma." During October and November she toured Germany in support of its release.

== New Zealand Idol performances (2005) ==
| Week | Song choice | Original artist | Result | Refs |
|---|---|---|---|---|
| Audition | "Secret Song" | Alanis Morissette | Top 60 | |
| Theatre Week (Round 1) | "Only When I Sleep" | The Corrs | Top 24 | |
| Semi-finals (Group 3) | "Uninvited" | Alanis Morissette | Wildcard contender | |
| Wildcard special | "Burn" | Tina Arena | Finalist | |
| Top 10 | "Mascara" | Killing Heidi | Top 9 | |
| Top 9 | "Roam" | The B-52's | Bottom 3 | |
| Top 8 | "Foolish Games" | Jewel | Top 7 | |
| Top 7 | "Going Under" | Evanescence | Top 6 | |
| Top 6 | "Walk On By" | Dionne Warwick | Top 5 | |
| Top 5 | "Zombie" | The Cranberries | Eliminated | |

== Discography ==
=== Studio albums ===
- Bird of a Feather (14 November 2014) – Musszo Records
- Apart (27 September 2019) – Jazzhaus Records
- 33, Single and Broke (21 Oktober 2022) – Jazzhaus Records

=== Extended plays ===
- Teresa Bergman (1 October 2011) – Musszo Records

=== Singles ===
- "Tui Sings Blue" (March 2017) – KTF Records/Musszo Records
