= Ben Lummis =

- Born: Benjamin Lummis; 1 June 1978 (age 48)
- Origin: Wellington, New Zealand
- Genres: Pop, R&B
- Occupation: Singer fitness instructor
- Instrument: Singing
- Years active: 2004–2007
- Label: Sony BMG (2004) Soul'd Out (2007–present)
- Website: web.archive.org/web/20080308121327/http://www.benlummismusic.com/

Ben Lummis (born Isileli Junior Brown on 1 June 1978) is a New Zealand R&B/pop/gospel recording artist who won the first season of New Zealand Idol in 2004.

== Biography ==
=== New Zealand Idol 2004 ===
Lummis auditioned for the first season of New Zealand Idol in early 2004, and after passing through the theatre rounds, he qualified for the semi-finals, where the public voted him through to the Top 10. Lummis landed in the bottom three contestants on three separate occasions but, from the top six onwards, he was never in the bottom three again, and on 10 May 2004, he was crowned as the first New Zealand Idol, defeating Michael Murphy. Lummis is one of only two Idol winners worldwide to land in the bottom three in the first week of the finals. The other is 2005 Canadian Idol Melissa O'Neil.

== Post Idol career ==
=== 2004–2005: One Road ===
Immediately after his victory, Lummis signed a recording contract with Sony BMG and released his debut single "They Can't Take That Away", which debuted at number one on the New Zealand Singles Chart. It held the position for seven weeks and was certified 4xPlatinum, selling 40,000 copies. Lummis completed a nationwide New Zealand Idol Live! tour with his fellow finalists, and then on 15 June 2004, just four weeks after his Idol victory, Lummis released his debut album, One Road. The album sold 45,000 copies and was certified 3xPlatinum. Paul Ellis, Lummis's manager at the time and New Zealand Idol judge later described it as the "worst-sounding album of my entire career" due to the short timeframe in which it was produced.

Three months after the release of his album, Lummis left his record label Sony BMG after a mutual disagreement. As Lummis had held the top spot on the albums and singles chart simultaneously for more than a week with strong sales, but he was dropped by his label nevertheless.

=== 2006–2007: Independent music and Pop's Ultimate Star ===
Having taken a career break following his debut album and departure from Sony BMG, Lummis released the single "Gotta Move" in 2006, independently and exclusively through his personal website. Although well received by fans, the single was unable to chart as its sales were online only and at the time, not tracked by the RIANZ.

After another short break, Lummis was announced as one of the ten contestants on Pop's Ultimate Star, a new New Zealand reality television show whose aim was to take contestants from past singing competitions and pit them against one another to discover the country's favourite reality show singing star. The show debuted on 29 May 2007, and after passing through the first four weeks without falling into the bottom two at all, Lummis made it to the final six. At this point he fell into the bottom two alongside Emily Williams, the runner-up from the third season of Australian Idol, and was voted off on 1 July after an elimination duel with Williams, finishing in sixth place. After this, he announced his intention to release more new music independently.

=== 2007–present: New album ===
Lummis announced in late 2007, that he had intentions on writing more of his own music, and releasing songs independently on a new album. Since then Lummis has been working on a new album, right throughout 2008. He has also appeared on the TVNZ morning show, Good Morning, where he made a live performance of one of his new tracks called, "Smooth Lady", the first song from the album. However, this album has not been released as of 2025.

== Discography ==
Ben Lummis discography
- Studio albums: 1
- Singles: 2
- Music videos: 3
- B-sides: 1
- Other charted songs: 1
- Collaborations: 1
- Tours: 1

The following article is a complete discography of the albums and singles released by New Zealand R&B/Pop singer/artist Ben Lummis.

=== Albums ===
Year	Information	New Zealand	Certifications
2004	One Road: First studio album; Released: 16 June 2004; Label: Sony BMG; Format: CD	1	NZ: Platinum x2

=== Singles ===
Year	Song	New Zealand	Certification	Album
2004	"They Can't Take That Away"	1	4xPlatinum	One Road
2006	"Risen"	—	—	The Rising EP

=== Other albums/singles ===
Statistics	Singles
Home Grown (with the Top 10 of NZ Idol): Released: 21 April 2004; Label: Sony BMG; Peak chart positions: #3 New Zealand; New Zealand sales: 7,500; RIANZ Certification: Gold	"Yesterday Was Just the Beginning of My Life" – No. 4 (Gold) (with the Top 10 of NZ Idol)

Preceded by None	NZ Idol winner Season 1 (2004)	Succeeded by Rosita Vai
