= Hold Out (Matthew Saunoa song) =

Single by Matthew Saunoa
- Released: 2006
- Genre: Pop
- Length: 3:24
- Songwriter: James Reid

"Hold Out" is a single released by New Zealand Idol Season three winner Matthew Saunoa as the winner's single. This single was written by The Feelers front man, James Reid.

It reached number one on the New Zealand charts for one week 1 in 2006.

== Track listing ==
Digital download

1. "Hold Out" – 3:24
2. "Hold Out" (instrumental) – 3:24
