= Golden (Rosita Vai album) =

Studio album by Rosita Vai
- Released: 1 November 2005
- Recorded: October 2005
- Genre: R&B/Pop
- Length: 38:04
- Label: Sony BMG

Singles from Golden
- 1. "All I Ask" Released: 17 October 2005

Golden is the debut album from second-season NZ Idol winner Rosita Vai, released in New Zealand on 1 November 2005.

== Chart and single information ==
=== Chart ===
Golden debuted on the official New Zealand albums chart at number 15, but fell to number 25 its second week. In its third week, the album fell to number 33, and then it dropped out of the Top 40 completely. Despite the fact that it received very positive critical reviews, the album spent a mere three weeks on the chart and sold less than 7,000 copies. It therefore failed to reach gold status (7,500 copies sold).

=== Singles ===
Rosita's New Zealand Idol winner's song, "All I Ask", was the only single released from the album on 18 October 2005. It debuted at number 1 on the official New Zealand singles chart, a position that it held for two consecutive weeks. The single remained in the top 40 for 9 weeks and was certified double platinum (30,000 copies sold). The album's title track was originally slated to be released as the second single, however this never materialised.

== Track listing ==
1. "Take Me High" – 3:00
2. "You're All I Need To Get By" – 3:30
3. "Knowing" – 3:37
4. "Golden" – 3:23
5. "Chocolate" – 4:21
6. "Déjà Vous" – 4:13
7. "Bang" – 3:36
8. "I Can't Tell You Why" – 3:42
9. "If This Is The Love" – 3:11
10. "Nobody's Supposed To Be Here" – 3:44
11. "All I Ask" – 3:47
