= So Damn Beautiful (Michael Murphy song) =

Single by Michael Murphy

from the album No Place to Land
- Released: 2004
- Recorded: 2004
- Genre: Pop
- Label: Sony

Michael Murphy singles chronology
"So Damn Beautiful" (2004)	"Music Without a Song" (2004)

"So Damn Beautiful" is a single by New Zealand Idol season one runner-up, Michael Murphy, released in 2004. It was a #1 hit on the RIANZ charts.

== Charts ==
Chart (2004)	Peak Position
New Zealand (Recorded Music NZ)	1

== Certifications ==
In New Zealand, the song was certified gold during 2004.

== Track listing ==
1. So Damn Beautiful
2. All We Are
