= Ashley Cooper (singer) =

- Born: 23 February 1988 (age 38)
- Origin: Cambridge, New Zealand
- Genre: Country
- Years active: 2005–present

Ashley Cooper (born 23 February 1988) is a country singer from New Zealand.

== Biography ==
Cooper was born in Cambridge, New Zealand. She was a contestant on the second series of New Zealand Idol. After being the third person to be eliminated out of the top ten on Idol, she released her first single "I Want You", which debuted at nineteen and eventually peaked at number nine. Most of the single's success can be based on the physical sales of the single, as well as airplay, which it received.

Cooper and songwriter Michael Tipping began working together in 2007, forming the duo 2am. They later changed the name to Michael & Ashley, and then to Cooper's Run. They were named New Zealand's Rising Stars and Horizon Winners at the New Zealand National Country Music Awards in 2009. In the same year, Cooper became the first New Zealander to sing at the Global Artist Showcase in Nashville. The duo also released the album "Missing Home".

In 2010 the duo won Duo/Group of the Year at the New Zealand National Country Music Awards. In 2011 the pair were the opening support act for country group Lady Antebellum at their Auckland concert.

== Discography ==
- (2005) "Dedicated to the One I Love", (with the finalists of NZ Idol) - #5 NZ
- (2006) "I Want You" - #9 NZ
- (2010) "Summertime"
