= They Can't Take That Away =

Single by Ben Lummis

from the album One Road
- Released: 2004
- Recorded: 2004
- Genre: Pop
- Label: Sony
- Songwriter(s): Andrew Frampton, Shaye Smith, Steve Kipner

Ben Lummis singles chronology
"They Can't Take That Away" (2004)	"I Love You Love Me" (2004)

"They Can't Take That Away" is a single by New Zealand Idol season one winner Benjamin Lummis, released in 2004. It went to number one in its first week, where it remained for seven weeks. It was the only single released for Lummis' debut album, One Road.

"They Can't Take That Away" was commercially successful, becoming 2004's number-one single in New Zealand, breaking records by selling nearly 12,000 copies in a week. It held this record for eight years until it was overtaken by Flight of the Conchords' 2012 charity single "Feel Inside (And Stuff Like That)".

"They Can't Take That Away" spent 14 weeks on the charts peaking at number 1, and was number 1 in the top 50 singles of 2004.

== Track listing ==
1. "They Can't Take That Away"
2. "Coffee & Cream"
