= Dream (TrueBliss album) =

Studio album by TrueBliss
- Released: May 1999 (New Zealand)
- Recorded: 1999
- Genre: Pop
- Length: 49:04
- Label: Columbia

Professional ratings
Review scores
| Source | Rating |
|---|---|
| Dominion Post | (Favorable) |

Dream is New Zealand band TrueBliss's only album, released in 1999 in New Zealand on the Columbia Records label.

== Album information ==
The lead single, "Tonight", was a number one hit in New Zealand and the biggest-selling single of 1999 there. The album sold in excess of double-platinum copies in New Zealand and was supported by the Number One Tour.

The recording of the album was documented in the very first series of PopStars a TV show which became a global hit. The recording was completed in a matter of a few weeks to ensure the album would sell off the back of the TV series. It was almost entirely written by Anthony Ioasa with three cover versions included.

== Track listing ==
| No. | Title | Writer(s) | Length |
|---|---|---|---|
| 1. | "Tonight" | Anthony Ioasa | 3:46 |
| 2. | "Number One" | Anthony Ioasa | 4:05 |
| 3. | "La Isla Bonita" | Madonna, Patrick Leonard, Bruce Gaitsch | 4:46 |
| 4. | "I Love The Way" | Chris Thompson, John Van Tongeren | 4:17 |
| 5. | "Believe" | Anthony Ioasa | 3:15 |
| 6. | "Don't Turn Your Back" | Anthony Ioasa | 5:00 |
| 7. | "My Sweet Love" | Anthony Ioasa | 4:52 |
| 8. | "Freedom" | George Michael | 4:45 |
| 9. | "Dream (Let This Be The Love)" | Anthony Ioasa | 4:43 |
| 10. | "Heaven" | Anthony Ioasa | 3:18 |
| 11. | "Love To Love" | Anthony Ioasa | 4:15 |
| 12. | "Closer (a capella)" | Stock/Waterman/Minogue | 1:54 |

== Singles ==
"Tonight" was released in May 1999 and debuted at #1 in New Zealand where it stayed for two weeks. It was named the biggest-selling New Zealand single of 1999 at the New Zealand Tui Music Awards.

"Number One" was released in August 1999. It debuted at #13 in the charts and after falling out of the top 20 the following week, it climbed back up to its peak of #12. To this day, the video clip remains the most expensive clip ever made in New Zealand. Its relative lack of success can be put down to radio ignoring the track and playing the album track "Freedom", a cover of the Wham! hit which Joe had sung at her audition.

"Freedom" was released in October 1999. However it failed to chart as the week it was released the New Zealand charts started to incorporate a 50% radio-play component and its radio play had died down weeks before its commercial release. It ended up being the 76th most played song on new Zealand radio of 1999.

"Don't Turn Your Back" was the final single release and was issued to radio stations only. Airplay was low, no video was made and the planned commercial release was cancelled.

== Chart performance ==
In 1999, Dream peaked at #1 in New Zealand.

== Sales and certifications ==
In 1999, Dream was certified Platinum in New Zealand.
