= Michael Murphy (singer) =

- Born: 4 September 1986 (age 40)
- Origin: Taupō, New Zealand
- Genres: Pop rock, Cinematic Rock, Hard rock, Metalcore
- Occupations: Singer, actor
- Instrument: Singing
- Years active: 2004–present
- Label: BMG
- Member of: Written by Wolves
- Formerly of: 5star Fallout
- Website: writtenbywolves.com

Michael Sean D'Arcy Murphy (born 4 September 1986) is a New Zealand singer. He was runner-up of New Zealand Idol (NZ Idol) in 2004, behind Ben Lummis, who became his friend over the course of the contest.

After NZ Idol, Michael Murphy had signed to BMG records. Murphy's first single debuted at No. 1 and stayed a while at the top of radio charts. He gained a gold status for No Place to Land, his debut album. He then toured New Zealand, singing to sold-out audiences. With 5star Fallout, Michael toured New Zealand, the U.S. and English pubs. He is now the lead singer of New Zealand Rock Band Written By Wolves.

== 5star Fallout ==
In 2006, Murphy joined his four former Deadset bandmates to form the band 5star Fallout, with him as the lead singer.

== Rent ==
Murphy appeared in the Theatre Company's production of RENT at the civic theatre in Auckland.

== Coca-Cola Christmas in the Park ==
Murphy performed in the 2010 Christmas in the Park concert in Christchurch on 27 November and in Auckland on 11 December 2010, as one of three years performing the Christmas concerts.

== Written by Wolves ==
In late 2014, Murphy formed his current band, Written By Wolves.

On 8 November 2019, they released their debut album, Secrets. This was later followed by an EP, The Collab Project // Secrets, on 17 September 2021, comprising five reimagined songs from the prior album. These songs feature guest vocals from Kellin Quinn, Sonny Sandoval, Sydney Rae White, Trenton Woodley, and Becks.

Their second album, The Lighthouse, released on 26th Jule 2024.

== Discography ==
=== With 5star Fallout ===
Studio Albums

- Say Goodnight (2008)

=== With Written by Wolves ===
Studio Albums

- Secrets (2019)
- The Lighthouse (2024)

Compilation Albums

- The Archives (2025)

Extended Plays

- The Secret Sessions (2016)
- To Tell You The Truth / Starlight (2017)
- Prologue (2019)
- The Collab Project // Secrets (2021)
- Altar (2023)
- Goddess (2023)
- Burn (2023)
- The Secret Sessions Volume II (2025)

Singles

| Year | Song | Album |
|---|---|---|
| 2015 | "Not Afraid to Die" | The Archives |
| 2015 | "Explode" | The Archives |
| 2015 | "Elastic Heart" (Sia cover) | The Archives |
| 2015 | "Pretty Lies" | The Archives |
| 2016 | "Lights" | The Archives |
| 2016 | "Genius" | The Archives |
| 2017 | "Timebombs & Hurricanes" | Prologue |
| 2017 | "To Tell You The Truth" | The Archives |
| 2017 | "Starlight" | Prologue |
| 2017 | "Apathy (Is A Hell Of A Drug)" | Non-album singles |
| 2018 | "Follow Me" | The Archives |
| 2018 | "Ripple" | Non-album singles |
| 2018 | "Oxygen" | Prologue |
| 2019 | "Tell Me What You're Running From?" | Secrets |
| 2019 | "Secrets" | Secrets |
| 2019 | "As Long As It Takes" | Secrets |
| 2020 | "Demons" | Secrets |
| 2020 | "Let It Burn" (Acoustic Version) | Non-album singles |
| 2020 | "Any Second" | The Archives |
| 2020 | "Oh No" | The Archives |
| 2021 | "Help Me Through The Night" (featuring Kellin Quinn) | The Collab Project // Secrets |
| 2021 | "Better Luck Next Time" (featuring Trenton Woodley of Hands Like Houses) | The Collab Project // Secrets |
| 2021 | "Forever & Always" (featuring Becks) | The Collab Project // Secrets |
| 2021 | "Papercut" (Linkin Park cover) | The Archives |
| 2023 | "Give 'Em Hell" | The Lighthouse |
| 2023 | "Misery" | The Lighthouse |
| 2023 | "Take Me Home" | The Lighthouse |
| 2023 | "Altar" | The Lighthouse |
| 2023 | "Goddess" | The Lighthouse |
| 2023 | "Burn" | The Lighthouse |
| 2024 | "Please, Just Breath" | The Lighthouse |
| 2025 | "Please, Just Breath" (The Secret Sessions Version) | The Secret Sessions Volume II |
| 2025 | "Misery" (The Secret Sessions Version) | The Secret Sessions Volume II |
| 2026 | "End of Beginning" (Djo cover) | Non-album single |

=== Solo career ===
Albums

| Year | Title | Label | Charted | Country |
|---|---|---|---|---|
| 2004 | Homegrown with the NZ Idol 2004 finalists | | #3 (Gold) | New Zealand |
| 2004 | No Place to Land | BMG New Zealand | #22 (Gold) | New Zealand |
| 2007 | Say Goodnight | Charta Records Limited | | New Zealand |

Singles

| Year | Single | Album | Charted | Certification |
|---|---|---|---|---|
| 2004 | "Yesterday Was Just The Beginning of My Life" with the finalists of NZ Idol. | Homegrown | #4 (NZ) | Gold (NZ) |
| 2004 | "So Damn Beautiful" | No Place to Land | #1 (NZ) | Gold |
| 2005 | "Music Without A Song" | No Place to Land | Did Not Chart | - |
| 2005 | "How Good Does It Feel?" | No Place to Land | Did Not Chart | - |
