= Megan Alatini =

New Zealand pop singer (born 1976)

- Born: Megan Brinwinne Cassie; 29 September 1976 (age 50)
- Origin: George, Cape Province, South Africa
- Genre: Pop
- Occupations: Actress, singer, TV personality
- Instrument: Vocals
- Years active: 1999–present
- Formerly of: TrueBliss

Megan Bronwinne Alatini (née Cassie, born 29 September 1976) is a South African-New Zealand pop singer, actress and television personality. She rose to fame in New Zealand on the reality television series Popstars. She went on to become a member in the girl group TrueBliss. She is also known for portraying the part of Java in the popular sci-fi series The Tribe. Later she gained more exposure appearing as a judge on New Zealand Idol.

== Early life ==
Alatini was born in George, Cape Province, South Africa, as the first child of Barbara and Daniel Cassie. She spent the first eleven years of her life there, until her family relocated to New Zealand in 1987. She enrolled in Papatoetoe High School in Auckland, becoming a prefect and being considered a good student and role model. At age 17 she met Pita Alatini, a future New Zealand All Black rugby player, and began dating him. She soon became pregnant – her future plans of going to University were disrupted, and on 13 May 1995, her daughter Tonica was born. Megan loved singing from an early age and considered it a part of her culture. Through Pita, she also became fluent in Tongan.

== Career ==
Her family encouraged her to audition for Popstars in early 1999, and, much to her astonishment, she made the cut and eventually became a member of TrueBliss, the first band ever to be formed out of Popstars. The five girls went on to cut a #1 single followed by a #1 album, before they (unofficially) parted in late 2000.

In February 2000, Alatini married her long-time boyfriend Pita, who had proposed to her on her 24th birthday. She also formed a singing group with her sisters and made various singing appearances all over New Zealand throughout the years. In late 2001, she recorded several songs with her sisters, some of which have been released on the Abe Messiah: New Edition album.

Alatini has also enjoyed a lively career as an actress. She started off with guest stints on Hercules and Young Hercules. Her actress sister Meryl Cassie helped her and her younger sister Monique land parts as core characters in The Tribe. In addition, she played Dr. Leggz in the wacky comedic drama series Atlantis High. Soon after filming ended, Alatini gave birth to her second daughter named Tiara. In 2005, she delivered her first son, Trey.

From 2003 to 2006, Alatini lived in Tokyo, Japan with her husband, where he plays rugby, and their three children.

On 12 May 2006, it was announced that Alatini had accepted the offer of becoming a judge on the panel of the forthcoming third season of New Zealand Idol. In 2007, Megan appeared on the third season of Dancing with the Stars in New Zealand, where she placed runner-up.

In mid 2008, along with Pita and her three children, she moved back to Japan so he could play rugby union.

In March 2011, Megan and her family were affected by the Japanese 9.0 magnitude earthquake and tsunami where they were evacuated from their home. They were safely transported back to New Zealand approximately 1 week after the disaster occurred.

In 2014, she became a flight attendant with Air New Zealand.

Alatini and her husband later separated, and she married Natalie McDade in March 2025.

== Discography ==
=== Albums ===
- 1999: Dream - #1 NZ (TrueBliss)
- 2003: Abe Messiah: Remix (The Tribe, Yugeslavian release only)

=== Singles ===
- 1999: "Tonight" - #1 NZ (highest selling single of the year) (True Bliss)
- 1999: "Number One" - #12 NZ (TrueBliss)
- 1999: "Freedom" (TrueBliss)

== Filmography ==
=== Starring roles ===
- 1999: Popstars as herself
- 2001: Atlantis High as Dr. Leggz
- 2001–03: The Tribe as Java
- 2006: New Zealand Idol as judge
- 2007: Dancing with the Stars as contestant

=== Guest roles ===
- 1992: Shortland Street
- 1999: Hercules: The Legendary Journeys
- 1999: Young Hercules as Sea Nymph in the episode 'Apollo'
