= New Zealand Idol =

- Created by: Simon Fuller
- Presented by: Dominic Bowden
- Judges: Frankie Stevens (2004-06); Fiona McDonald (2004); Paul Ellis (2004–05); Jackie Clarke (2005); Iain Stables (2006); Megan Alatini (2006)
- Country of origin: New Zealand
- No. of seasons: 3

Production
- Executive producers: Andrew Shaw (2004); Adrian Brant (2005); Gavin Wood (2006); Jane Millichip (2006)
- Production locations: South Pacific Pictures, Auckland (2004–2006)
- Running time: Auditions/Performance show 60–90 minutes Elimination show 60 minutes (Both shows include commercials)

Original release
- Network: TV2
- Release: 1 February 2004 – 29 October 2006

New Zealand Idol, also known as NZ Idol, is the New Zealand version of the Idol series which originated in the United Kingdom as Pop Idol. New Zealand first saw the Idol format when TV2 aired American Idol 2, which garnered impressive ratings. After Australian Idol also received good ratings in New Zealand, TVNZ decided to order the first season of NZ Idol, which was broadcast on TV2. After the third season in 2006, TVNZ made a decision not to fund or broadcast a fourth season.

NZ Idol was produced by South Pacific Pictures in association with Grundy Television and developed by Fremantle Media.

== Season one ==
The show was hosted by TV presenter Dominic Bowden and the panel of judges consisted of Frankie Stevens, Fiona McDonald and Paul Ellis. The first episode was watched by over 1.15 million viewers.

The competition was tough in the final few rounds of NZ Idol but it was finally whittled down to the top ten. Nine of these were voted in by the public through three heats (Camillia Temple, Ben Lummis and Filipo Saipani; Michael Murphy, Luke Whaanga and 'Big' Dave Houma; Robin Johnson, Sela Mahe and Eddie Gaiger). Jessie Cassin was added by the judges as a wildcard. Ben Lummis eventually won the competition despite being in the bottom 3 in the first, third and fourth round of the competition, while Michael Murphy who eventually came second in the season had not been in the bottom 3 at all. Camillia Temple, the oldest contestant at 28, who had been a favourite to win, ended up in third place.

Ben Lummis released his idol-winning single "They Can't Take That Away" which spent 7 weeks at #1, selling over 40,000 units. His Album 'One Road' debuted at #1 on the album charts, selling over 30,000 copies. His second single, "I Love You Love Me" failed to make radio playlists and the single was shelved. His video for the single, however, did play on video music channels.

=== Semi Final Qualifyings ===
Top 24

Format: 3 out of 8 making the final each week plus one Wildcard

Date	First	Second	Third
22 February	Camillia Temple	Ben Lummis	Filipo Saipani
29 February	Michael Murphy	Luke Whaanga	Dave Houma
7 March	Sela Mahe	Robin Johnson	Eddie Gaiger
13 March (Wildcard)	Jessie Cassin (Judges Choice)	Amanda Boyce (missed out)	Nigel Withington (missed out)

=== Bottom three statistics ===
Date	Theme	Contestants		
Bottom three
15 March	Contestant's Choice	Filipo Saipani	Eddie Gaiger	Ben Lummis
22 March	Homegrown Hits	Sela Mahe	Robin Johnson	Jessie Cassin
29 March	Disco Hits	Jessie Cassin (2)	Eddie Gaiger (2)	Ben Lummis (2)
5 April	Ballads	Robin Johnson (2)	Eddie Gaiger (3)	Ben Lummis (3)
12 April	British Invasion	Eddie Gaiger (4)	Luke Whaanga	Dave Houma
Bottom two
19 April	Soul Hits	Dave Houma (2)		Camillia Temple
26 April	Rock Hits	Luke Whaanga (3)		Camillia Temple (2)
Bottom three
3 May	80s Hits	Camillia Temple (3)		
10 May	Grand Finale	Michael Murphy		Ben Lummis (3)

== Season two ==
Auditions for the second series of NZ Idol began in June 2005. The show was once again hosted by Dominic Bowden, with Jackie Clarke replacing Fiona McDonald, who was pregnant with her first child, as one of the three judges. The nine that got in by public vote were: Nik Carlson, Frank Andrews, Jesse O'Brien, Rosita Vai, Rongo Brightwell, Keshia Paulse and Shelley Paikea. Teresa Bergman, failed to make the top nine, eventually being asked back by the judges in the wildcard, and winning the wildcard vote. Keshia Paulse, who was one of the favourites to win the competition, was voted out unexpectedly in the second round. Rosita Vai was the eventual winner of NZ Idol 2 and the first female contestant to win the competition. Rosita had not been in the bottom 3 in the whole season. Nik Carlson from Masterton came second, while Steven Broad finished in third place.

Rosita released her single "All I Ask" which spent two weeks at #1 and went platinum. However her debut album Golden only reached #15 without being certified and spent only three weeks in the top 40 album chart.

In 2006 Ashley Cooper has enjoyed success with her single "I Want You" debuting at #19, eventually peaking at #11 on physical sales and very little airplay. Also in 2006, Robert Arnold, who had auditioned unsuccessfully for all three seasons made it to #1 in the New Zealand charts as part of Boyband – a radio station stunt – three weeks before Matt Saunoa hit the top.

While these singers got to high places, there were many wannabe applicants that did poorly. One of note was a certain Liz Shaw, who came not just to audition but to also try to take over host Dominic Bowden's presenting job, only to spectacularly fail.

The series once again proved a ratings hit in New Zealand, but Sony BMG were reportedly unhappy with the format and reviewed their role in the program.

=== Semifinal qualifyings ===
Top 24
Format: 3 out of 8 making the final each week and one wildcard

Date
First
Second
Third
25 July
Keshia Paulse
Steve Broad
Frank Andrews
1 August
Rosita Vai
Shelley Paikea
Ashley Cooper
8 August
Nik Carlson
Jesse O'Brien
Rongo Brightwell
15 August

(Wildcard)

Teresa Bergman
(Viewers Choice)
Lissel Stewart
(missed out)
Kevin Malagamaali'i
(missed out)

=== Bottom three statistics ===
Date	Bottom Three
22 August	Shelley Paikea	Ashley Cooper	Nik Carlson
29 August	Keshia Paulse	Nik Carlson (2)	Teresa Bergman
5 September	Ashley Cooper (2)	Frank Andrews	Steven Broad
12 September	Frank Andrews (2)	Rongo Brightwell	Steven Broad (2)
19 September	Rongo Brightwell (2)	Jesse O'Brien	Steven Broad (3)
	Bottom Two
26 September	Teresa Bergman (2)	Jesse O'Brien (2)
3 October	Jesse O'Brien (3)	Nik Carlson (3)
	Final Three
10 October	Steven Broad (4)
17 October	Nik Carlson (4)	Rosita Vai

== Season three ==
The third (and to date, last) season of NZ Idol began screening in July 2006. Dominic Bowden returned as host, and judges Paul Ellis and Jackie Clarke were replaced by Iain Stables, a popular radio DJ from the ZM radio station, and Megan Alatini, a former member of girlgroup TrueBliss, the first band created from the popular TV show Popstars. This left Frankie Stevens as the only original judge. In addition to a recording contract, in series 3 contestestants are also in the running for a cash prize of $50,000 and a Daihatsu SUV. The maximum age limit to enter was increased from 28 to 30. Another key difference in the third season is the inclusion of a live band in the top ten shows. On 31 May 2006, South Pacific Pictures announced that SonyBMG was to discontinue its association with NZ Idol.

On 21 August the top 9 was officially announced. Aroha Robinson, Ashlee Fisher, Clinton Randell, Indira Moala, Kali Kopae, Matthew Saunoa, Rebecca Wright, Victor Sulfa and Toni Baird. On the same night the 3 wildcards were announced. The host, Dominic Bowden stated that the viewers had 12 hours to choice their 10th person to make up the final 10. The 3 wildcards were: Ben Hazlewood, Lenken Isaac and Wiremu Hohaia. On 22 August Ben Hazlewood won the wildcard vote. It had been announced that the top 10 was not going to release a single, like previous seasons.

On 29 October Matt Saunoa won the competition without falling into the bottom 2/ 3 throughout the whole season. Although betting agency Centrebet had Indira Moala favourite to win . His debut single "Hold Out" was written by James Reid from The Feelers. The single charted at #1 in the first week, but failed to reach gold status (at least 5,000 copies sold), and dropped the following week to #3.

=== Semi Final Qualifyings ===
Top 18
Format: 3 out of 6 making the final each week in another city + one Wildcard

Date	Location	First	Second	Third
7 August	Christchurch	Clinton Randell	Kali Kopae	Ashlee Fisher
14 August	Auckland	Indira Moala	Toni Baird	Victor Sulfa
21 August	Wellington	Rebecca Wright	Matthew Saunoa	Aroha Robinson
22 August	Wildcard	Ben Hazlewood	Lenken Isaac	Wiremu Hohaia

=== Bottom three statistics ===
Date	Bottom Three
28 August	Victor Sulfa	Ashlee Fisher	Toni Baird
	Bottom Two
4 September	Ashlee Fisher (2)	Kali Kopae
11 September	Clinton Randell	Kali Kopae (2)
18 September	Rebecca Wright	Indira Moala
25 September	Toni Baird (2)	Ben Hazlewood
2 October	Kali Kopae (3)	Aroha Robinson
9 October	Ben Hazlewood (2)	Aroha Robinson (2)
	Final Three
16 October	Aroha Robinson (3)
29 October	Indira Moala (2)	Matthew Saunoa

== Pop's Ultimate Star ==
Many previous contestants later appeared on Pop's Ultimate Star, along with other New Zealand celebrities.

== Criticism ==
Critics have suggested that contestants in all seasons have not been as musically strong as Idol performers from American Idol or Australian Idol, and have referred to the performances as 'karaoke'.

Complaints have been made in regards to a variety of production issues including the lack of a live band in seasons one and two, the lighting and the sound quality.

Concerns have also been expressed about the apparent lack of ongoing opportunities for Idols after the show. Three months after winning New Zealand Idol, Lummis' music label, Sony BMG dropped him.

Various New Zealand musicians have openly criticised the show, and refused invitations to appear on it. Boh Runga stated that she "would rather lick the inside of a toilet bowl than appear on Idol." TV Guide stated after the third series aired that the show had lost around 100,000 viewers since the first series, and that "if NZ Idol was a horse, you would have to shoot it. It really is that lame."

== NZ Idol in the charts ==
=== DVD ===
- (2004) NZ Idol 1 – Greatest Moments – #4 NZ

=== Albums ===
- (2004) NZ Idol: The Final 10 – Homegrown – #3 NZ (Gold)
- (2004) Ben Lummis – One Road – #1 NZ (2 weeks) (4× Platinum)
- (2004) Michael Murphy – No Place to Land – #22 NZ (Gold)
- (2005) Rosita Vai – Golden – #15 NZ

=== Singles ===
Date	Artist	Title	NZ Chart	Accreditation
From Season one:
2004	NZ Idol: Final 10	"Yesterday Was Just the Beginning of My Life"	#4	Gold
2004	Ben Lummis	"They Can't Take That Away"	#1 (7 weeks)	4× Platinum
2004	Ben Lummis	"I Love You Love Me"	-	-
2004	Jessie Cassin	"Another Suitcase in Another Hall"	-	-
2004	Michael Murphy	"So Damn Beautiful"	#1 (1 week)	Gold
2005	Michael Murphy	"Music Without a Song"	-	-
2005	Michael Murphy	"How Good Does It Feel?"	-	-
2006	Ben Lummis	"Gotta Move"	-	-
From Season two:
2005	NZ Idol 2: Final 10	"Dedicated to the One I Love"	#5	-
2005	Rosita Vai	"All I Ask"	#1 (2 weeks)	2× Platinum
2005	Rosita Vai	"Golden"	-	-
2005	Nik Carlson	"I Believe in a Thing Called Love"	-	-
2006	Ashley Cooper	"I Want You"	#11	-
From Season three:
2006	Matthew Saunoa	"Hold Out"	#1 (1 week)	
