= Pita Alatini =

NZ & Tonga international rugby union player

- Born: Pita Faiva-ki-moana Alatini; 11 April 1976 (age 50) Nukuʻalofa, Tonga
- Height: 1.79 m (5 ft 10 in)
- Weight: 90 kg (14 st 2 lb; 198 lb)
- School: King's College
- University: University of Otago

Rugby union career
- Position: Centre
Senior career
| Years | Team | Apps | (Points) |
| 1995–1996 | Counties Manukau | 30 | |
| 1997–1998 | Southland | 21 | |
| 1999–2001 | Otago | 16 | (20) |
| 2002–2003 | Wellington | 14 | (10) |
| 2004–2006 | Suntory Sungoliath | 21 | (42) |
| 2006–2013 | Kamaishi Seawaves | | |
Super Rugby
| Years | Team | Apps | (Points) |
| 1996 | Crusaders | 5 | |
| 1997 | Chiefs | 3 | |
| 1998–2001 | Highlanders | 48 | |
| 2002–2003 | Hurricanes | 16 | |
International career
| Years | Team | Apps | (Points) |
| 1995 | Tonga | 1 | (0) |
| 1999–2001 | New Zealand | 17 | (30) |
Coaching career
- Years: Team
- 2013–: Pakuranga United

Pita Faiva-ki-moana Alatini (born 11 April 1976) is a former professional rugby union footballer who played as a midfield back. Although he was born in Tonga, he played in 17 tests for New Zealand between 1999 and 2001, scoring six test tries.

Alatini played 81 NPC matches for four different provinces (Counties-Manukau, Southland, Otago, and Wellington), and 72 Super 12 matches for four different franchises (Crusaders, Chiefs, Highlanders, and Hurricanes). He has also played professionally in Japan for Suntory Sungoliath and Kamaishi Seawaves.

Alatini is married to pop singer and actress Megan Alatini. His brothers Tevita, Anthony and Sam Alatini have played for the Tonga national rugby union team.

== Career overview ==
Alatini moved to Auckland from Tonga as a child. He attended King's College, and played for the national secondary school side in 1993-94 and the national under-19 team in 1995. He played 30 matches for the Counties-Manukau NPC team in 1995–96, and five matches for the Crusaders in the Super 12 in 1996. He represented the New Zealand Colts and played three Super 12 matches for the Chiefs in 1997.

In 1997–98, Alatini played for Southland in the NPC, and began to specialise as a midfielder (up until then, he had often played as a fullback). Alatini played for the Highlanders in the Super 12 from 1998 to 2001, and it was during this time that he became a regular selection for the All Blacks.

In 2002 and 2003, Alatini played for the Hurricanes in the Super 12 and Wellington in the NPC. By this time, he had fallen out of favor with the All Black selectors, and in 2004 he moved to Japan to play for Suntory Sungoliath. In 2006, he left Suntory to play for Kamaishi Seawaves.

In 2013, Pita started a new role as Director of Rugby at Pakuranga United Rugby Club in Auckland's eastern suburbs. In his first year of coaching the premier side, he led Pakuranga United to their first Gallaher Shield victory in the club's 48-year history.

=== All Black career ===
Alatini made his debut for the All Blacks on 11 June 1999, in a 22–11 victory over New Zealand A at Jade Stadium. He played his first test on 26 June 1999, in a 54–7 victory over France at Athletic Park. He was selected for the 1999 Rugby World Cup squad, playing in a pool match against Italy which the All Blacks won 101–3, and coming on as a replacement for Tana Umaga in the third-place playoff against South Africa, which South Africa won 22–18.

Alatini was the All Blacks' first choice second five-eighth during the 2000 Tri Nations, and was selected for the All Blacks' end-of-year tour to France and Italy. He was dropped from the starting line-up for the tests against France, with the selectors preferring Daryl Gibson at second five-eighth due to his more physical defense. He played as an unused reserve in the second test against France, and started the test against Italy. He regained his place as the All Blacks' first choice second five-eighth for the 2001 domestic tests and Tri Nations. Alatini played his last test for the All Blacks on 1 September 2001, in a 29–26 loss to Australia at Stadium Australia.

After the 2001 Tri Nations, the All Blacks coaches Wayne Smith and Tony Gilbert were replaced by John Mitchell and Robbie Deans. Alatini was selected for the All Blacks for the last time on the 2001 tour of Ireland and Argentina. He was relegated to the mid-week team, with the new coaches preferring Aaron Mauger at second five-eighth for the test matches due to his superior distribution skills.

== Post rugby ==
In 2020 Alatini revealed on the docu-series Match Fit that he developed binge drinking problems shortly after being dropped from the All Blacks by Mitchell, but had recovered by 2020. He had the lowest possible metabolic age in season one of Match Fit, at 29 years old as a 44-year-old (-15), and becoming the only graduates of the program with Troy Flavell. He returned in season 2 of Match Fit in 2021, but as emergency backup squad. On the first tackle rugby scrimmage against East Coast, he dislocated his shoulder after scoring a try in the second half.

In 2024, he returned as a featured centre for Match Fit: Union vs. League. Before the start of the journey, he and Carlos Spencer already got max score for metabolic age, which is 15 years younger than biological age.

== Personal life ==
Pita married Megan Alatini in 2000, they met in 1994. He has three children: Two daughters, Tonica, born 13 May 1995 and Tiara born 2002, and one son, Trey, born 2005.
