= Joe Cotton =

Canadian-born New Zealand pop singer

- Also known as: Joe
- Born: Joanne Monique Cotton; 1978 (age 47–48)
- Genres: Pop
- Instrument: Vocals

Joanne Monique "Joe" Cotton, is a Canadian-born New Zealand pop singer who gained recognition as a member of the girl group TrueBliss, formed in 1999 on Popstars. Cotton has since joined a cover band, The Mermaids Danceband. She has also worked as a radio presenter, for More FM and The Edge.

== Biography ==
Cotton was born in Vancouver, Canada. She relocated with her family to Wellington, New Zealand in 1985. She has one brother, Paul Cotton, who was a member of popular kiwi Christian rock group, the Lads. Her niece, Hope Cotton, is also a prominent advocate within the Disability and LGBTQ+ spaces.

She studied music throughout her time at Wellington Girls' College leaving at the start of her seventh form year to do a three-year diploma in Rock and Commercial music at Whitireia Community Polytechnic.

Joe enjoyed performing from an early age and during fifth form her school choir attended the Australasian Choral Championships which they were the joint winners of. In late 1998 she auditioned for Popstars - she made the cut and eventually became a member of True Bliss, the first band to be formed out of Popstars.

The five girls went on to cut a #1 single followed by a #1 album, before they (unofficially) parted in late 2000.

Joe subsequently found work on the C4 television station and in radio, first with The Edge and most recently with More FM.

She also has a career alongside Amber Claire, Pauline Berry, guitarist Martin Winch and Becks Wright as a member of the cover band Mermaids Danceband which she joined in July 2000 after moving from Wellington to Auckland.

She won Pop's Ultimate Star, which aired on TV2 on Sundays at 7 pm.

Joe continued to work as a Radio DJ. She hosted the weekday (10 am-2 pm) show at The Edge before moving to the More FM Auckland afternoon show (weekdays 3 pm-7 pm) with Jesse Mulligan. After longtime breakfast host (Kim Adamson) left the station in August 2009, she and Jesse joined Jeremy Corbett to form "The Morning Fix with Corbett, Jesse and Joe" 6 am-10 am weekdays. In March 2011, Jesse left the show and was replaced with former More FM Auckland Workday and Saturday breakfast host, Peter Dakin, which made "More FM Morning Fix with Corbett, Joe and Peter" 5:30 am-10 am. The show was axed in October 2011 (just 8 months after it began), due to Jeremy's resignation and More FM switching to a new breakfast show hosted by Marc Ellis, Amber Peebles and Stu Tolan (which was fed to Auckland, Waikato and Wellington). She hosted the nationwide More FM Nights 7 pm-midnight (Sunday - Thursday). She was originally just filling in for Lee Plummer (who was taking 3 months maternity leave) but was given a permanent position on the show, which she remained in until December 2021. She then started a position at the Southland More FM Breakfast show which continued until late 2023.

She is married to Daniel Shields.

== Discography ==
=== Albums ===
- 1999: Dream - #1 NZ (TrueBliss)

=== Singles ===
- 1999: "Tonight" - #1 NZ (highest selling single of the year) (True Bliss)
- 1999: "Number One" - #12 NZ (TrueBliss)
- 1999: "Freedom" (TrueBliss)
- 2012: "A Minute of One Day" (TrueBliss)
- 2025: "SMARTEST GUYS" (Dusty Carpets - featured)

== Filmography ==
=== Starring roles ===
- 1999: Popstars as herself
- 2004: Celebrity Treasure Island NZ as herself
- 2007: Pop's Ultimate Star as herself
- 2021: The Masked Singer NZ as Medusa/Herself
- 2023: Celebrity Treasure Island NZ - All Stars as herself
