= Iain Stables =

New Zealand shock jock

- Born: Iain Phillip Stables; 1971 (age 55); Australia
- Occupations: Radio presenter; TV presenter
- Employers: ZM Network; Drive ZM Network; Drive The Edge

Iain Phillip Stables (born 1971) is a New Zealand shock jock and former owner of the Ski FM radio network. Stables worked on ZM and various other radio stations across New Zealand, beginning his radio career on Radio Windy in Wellington at the age of 14. He has also appeared in several television roles including as the "bad boy" judge on NZ Idol Series 3 in 2006, and as a regular guest on Good Morning and Shock Treatment. In 2007, Stables won the award for Best Non-Breakfast Host or Hosts (Metropolitan) at the New Zealand Radio Awards.

In the 2000s, Stables was involved in a number of controversial on-air media stunts, several of which attracted complaints to the broadcasting authority, and some which led to legal issues. Stables has been the subject of investigations by police multiple times, including for impersonating a traffic safety manager and assaulting members of the public. He has been convicted and fined for impersonating an Interpol detective, and was banned from flying with Qantas airlines after inflating a life-jacket during a flight. In 2000, Stables was sued by April Ieremia for defamation after falsely claiming to be married to her.

Stables has been charged with assault several times since the early 2010s. In 2011, he faced multiple charges of assault after he was filmed in an altercation with a Jetstar employee. The charges were subsequently dropped. In 2012, Stables was acquitted after being accused of assaulting his ex-partner's parents, but found guilty of assaulting her brother. In 2025, Stables admitted to assaulting a security guard, and is expected to be sentenced in August. In an unrelated case, Stables is currently facing accusations of strangling and assaulting his ex-partner, and will stand trial in November.

== Career ==
During his radio career Stables worked for a total of 16 radio stations in New Zealand and was fired from four. In the past Stables worked on two of New Zealand's largest radio networks ZM between 2003 and 2008 and before this on opposition station The Edge FM between 1995 and 2002.

On 24 February 2008, Stables announced to the Sunday News that he was no longer working for ZM, and has been taken off the air. After leaving ZM, Stables appeared on Jono's New Show on C4, and was appointed a role at Sky TV NZ where he worked as a presentation director. In 2008 Stables appeared on the TVNZ show Shock Treatment where he was sent to Jamaica to partake in military training. However, he left the show after only one day - the first Kiwi celebrity to quit the show. Stables also appeared on the TVNZ show The Sitting, which screens on TVNZ 6, on this show Stables spoke about himself while Painter Marty Welch painted Stables portrait.

In November 2009 Stables was approached to head independent CHR station Hit Radio X105, however Hit Radio X105 went off the air on 14 September 2010. Stables was due to begin working on Radio Hauraki on 11 October 2010. However, this was delayed after Stables became involved in a physical confrontation with a check-in employee of the airline Jetstar after a verbal altercation. Stables was stood down from his position following the fight with the Jetstar employee. A month later Stables contract with Radio Hauraki was terminated.

In 2013 Stables became the owner of the radio network Ski FM which is based in the central region of the North Island of New Zealand.

In 2021 Stables was criticised for posting job advertisements for his Taupo-Ruapehu central north island radio network Ski FM that joked about sexual harassment in the workplace, including having 'sexual harassment Sundays.' Further, the advertisements also joked about not being an accessible workplace, and had racist overtures. After complaints, the job advertisements were edited and Ski FM issued an apology.

=== Stunts ===
Stables' has a reputation for on-air stunts, many of which have landed him in trouble. Some of these include:

- In October, 2001, Stables courted controversy after holding a "Kiss My Arse for a Backstage Pass" contest. Stables dropped his pants and got a woman to kiss his bottom in front of 10,000 people at Hamilton's Summer Jam Concert.
- In February, 2002 Stables called Beach FM in Kapiti stating he was a Police Officer and had a traffic report to read out. When the announcer allowed Stables to read out his report on air, Stables told listeners if they are stuck in the traffic jam they can help pass the time by 'playing with themselves'.
- In September, 2003, the Broadcasting Complaints Authority upheld a complaint against Stables for inciting "bus rage" while on air. The complaint came after Stables called for passengers to dance, rip up seats, or leave chewing gum on buses if they were angry with a bus company's service.
- In December 2003, Stables caused a mass evacuation of 800 people from three beaches after falsely reporting sewage contamination and sharks in the waters.
- In February 2005, after Paul Holmes planted a new pōhutukawa tree on One Tree Hill in Auckland which was later removed by the Auckland City Council, Stables decided to erect a Swingball Set on One Tree Hill as a replacement for the original tree that was cut down in 2000, the Swingball pole was mounted in 90kg of concrete. Stables felt a Swingball Set was the fitting replacement for the tree that once stood in this location as the Swingball is a true Kiwi icon and could be enjoyed by generations to come. Auckland City Council removed the Swingball Set. In protest, ZM ran Swingball competitions all around New Zealand with mayors in various regions supporting the event
- In July 2006, while judging NZ Idol, Stables told an applicant that she "was no good at singing but would make an excellent 'Shag'". The applicant complained about Stables remarks, and as a result, the organisers allowed the applicant through to the next round, but she was eliminated in the following round where Stables had been stood down from judging.
- In January 2010, Stables assisted X105 workmate Warwick Slow into gatecrashing a party held for Prince William at Premier House in Wellington. The party was to show the Prince a true New Zealand barbecue and when Stables realised that "Sizzlers" (a brand of New Zealand sausages) weren't on the menu Stables sent workmate Slow to Premier House armed with a pack of Sizzlers and a loaf of Bread. Slow managed to gain entry by jumping the fence and was on the ground for eight minutes before being removed from the premises by Police. Stables conversed with Slow throughout the time via cellphone until the phone was confiscated by Police.

=== Legal issues ===
In September 2000, Stables was sued for Defamation of Character by TV presenter April Ieremia for stating that he was married to her, on his profile page, on The Edge website. His comments included not only saying that he was married to April but also that he 'Did it with her on the TV2 bus'. Other comments on Stables profile page stated that Stables liked working for The Edge most because he could steal CDs to support his drug problem, and stated that when he grows up he would like to be the 'TV2 Bus Driver'.

In September 2000, Stables was convicted and fined $1100 after impersonating a detective from Interpol. He called the Los Angeles police and claimed his co-workers Jason Reeves, Jay-Jay Feeney and Clarke Gayford were trying to enter the United States with kiwi eggs hidden in their "rear cavities". The trio were subsequently held for two hours at LA Airport, questioned and searched. Stables appeared in court wearing a Superman outfit, saying: "You can't put a Superhero in prison".

In 2002, Stables was investigated by police after impersonating a traffic safety manager as part of a phone call prank.

Following the 2010 termination at Radio Hauraki after the Jetstar incident, it was revealed that Stables had a clause in his contract stating it would be terminated if Stables became involved in any court action.The Jetstar employee was found not guilty of assaulting Stables, who was judged to be aggressive and abusive, and allegedly used a racist slur. During this court case, Stables had sought name suppression because of the effect it might have on his mental health, notably his Bipolar disorder, but this was application was rejected by the court. The Radio Network (who owns Radio Hauraki) had come to an arrangement and no legal action ensued.

In 2012, Stables was acquitted in the Wellington District Court of assaulting his ex-partner's parents, was found guilty of assaulting his ex-partner's brother, and not tried on a charge of threatening to kill.

In 2022, Stables was fined after falling asleep at the wheel, and crashing into a mailbox.

In 2025, Stables was accused of strangling and assaulting his ex-partner, and will stand trial in November. He also admitted to assaulting a security guard in an unrelated incident, and is expected to sentenced in August.

== Awards ==
Stables was the winner in the category Best Non-Breakfast Host or Hosts (Metropolitan) at the New Zealand Radio Awards in 2007. Stables created a stir with his offensive acceptance speech with remarks aimed at his former employer Canwest MediaWorks, Stables' speech prompted the Radio Broadcasters Association to adopt a Code of Conduct for all attending the awards including guidelines for acceptance speeches.

== Albums ==
In 2003 ZM and Stables released their own album called Stables Label Volume 3. It is unknown if there ever was a Volume 1 or 2. The Album features parodies of popular songs created by Stables and other ZM announcers.
