= Tonight (TrueBliss song) =

Single by TrueBliss

from the album Dream
- B-side: "Closer"
- Released: 1999
- Recorded: Air Force Studios, Auckland, March 1999
- Genre: Pop
- Length: 3:48
- Label: Columbia
- Songwriter(s): Anthony Ioasa
- Producer(s): Anthony Ioasa

TrueBliss singles chronology
"Tonight" (1999)	"Number One" (1999)

"Tonight" is the 1999 debut single of New Zealand girl group TrueBliss, the first ever group to be formed under the Popstars banner, as part of the 1999 TVNZ series. "Tonight" debuted at number one on the New Zealand Singles Chart, remained in the top 40 for 10 weeks and was certified platinum for sales of over 10,000 copies.

== Background ==
"Tonight" was written and produced by Silver Scroll-winning songwriter Anthony Ioasa as part of the Popstars television programme. The single included a karaoke version of the song and a cover of the 1992 Kylie Minogue song "Closer". The song was also the opening track on TrueBliss' debut album Dream.

== Music video ==
A music video was made for the single, directed by Andy Gale. It features TrueBliss at a slumber party, relaxing on a beach, hanging out on the street, eating at a diner, and dancing by a pool. The making of the music video was shown as part of Popstars.

== Track listings ==
CD single

1. "Tonight" (Radio Edit) — 3:48
2. "Tonight" (Karaoke Version) — 3:48
3. "Closer" — 1:55

== Charts ==
=== Weekly charts ===
Chart (1999)	Peak position
New Zealand (Recorded Music NZ)	1

=== Year-end charts ===
Chart (1999)	Position
New Zealand (Recorded Music NZ)	33

== Certifications ==
Region	Certification	Certified units/sales
New Zealand (RMNZ)	Platinum	10,000^{*}
^{*} Sales figures based on certification alone.
