= Rosita Vai =

- Also known as: Rosita Gibbons, Rosie
- Born: Rosita Angelica Vai; 4 June 1981 (age 45)
- Origin: Wellington, New Zealand
- Genres: Pop, soul
- Instruments: Vocals, piano
- Years active: 2005–present
- Label: Independent (2005–2007)
- Website: www.facebook.com

Rosita Angelica Gibbons née Vai (born 4 June 1981) is a New Zealand singer who rose to musical fame as the winner of the second season of New Zealand Idol in 2005.

== Early life ==
Rosita Gibbons was born in Wellington, brought up by her grandmother whom she acknowledges as one of the main influences in her life. She started singing at a very young age, at church and within family gatherings. Her parents were the caretakers of Wesley Methodist Church in Wellington. Gibbons' mother Niutao was a secretary, and her father Peniamina a mechanic.

In 1986, Gibbons moved with her family to Auckland. She was involved with music from an early age, and a At the age of seven, she started learning the piano with a neighbour and at age 13, she won a scholarship to study classical singing which allowed her to attend Westlake Girls High School, on Auckland's North Shore where she studied under the direction of Isabel Barnes, Beatrice Webster and Sheila Richardson. She also travelled internationally with her school choir.

After high school, she was accepted for a placement at the University of Auckland for the performing arts degree in classical singing, but withdrew after her second year to pursue dreams of becoming a songwriter in the music industry.

== NZ Idol ==
In 2005, Gibbons rose to fame as the winner of the second season of NZ Idol. Prior to her win, Gibbons managed to stay out of the "bottom three" placings for the entire competition, the only contestant to have done so in the history of NZ Idol. The very first female crowned New Zealand Idol, she also appeared on TV2's Showstoppers and Pop's Ultimate Star, which featured various winners from New Zealand Idol and PopStars; however, she was voted out in the second week of the competition.

After she won Idol, entertainer Sir Howard Morrison made comments about her large body size, saying it would affect her career and give the wrong image to her fans. Morrison and Gibbons reconciled on the TVNZ television show Close Up, and the two performed a duet together at a live concert in 2006.

She released an album titled Golden which made the Top 20 NZ Albums chart. She also won a Tui Award for Best Selling Single for her #1 hit "All I Ask" - her winners single for NZ Idol. She was nominated as the best female artist at the Pacific Music awards 2006.

== Later career ==
Of Samoan ethnicity, Gibbons performed at the opening ceremony of the 2007 Pacific Games, held in Apia, Samoa. The songstress expanded her skills to include musical theatre with her debut in Sinarella, a Pacific interpretation of the classic fairytale Cinderella in 2012, quickly followed by a 2013 season of Auckland Theatre Company's rock comedy The Little Shop of Horrors. Gibbons spent the majority of 2014 globe trotting as part of the ensemble cast of the critically acclaimed The Factory, created by Kila Kokonut Krew company – a nod to Pacific migration into Aotearoa during the 1960s and early 1970s. The Factory performed to sell-out audiences including the Edinburgh Fringe Festival. Her vocals have enabled her to collaborate with some of New Zealand's most talented musicians including Dame Malvina Major, Sir Howard Morrison, Bella Kalolo and Aaradhna. With a deep sense of pride in her heritage, she combines her Pacific culture with her classical training and a fusion of soul, gospel, hip hop and R&B to create music that a diverse audience can appreciate. Gibbons is now signed up with Soul Note Agency run by Te Awanui Reed of Nesian Mystik and is working on the edgy rock-opera Jesus Christ Superstar in Auckland, NZ.

The singer released her single and video clip "Koko Rice" in 2015. Later in the same year she released her debut EP Everything's Rosie in 2015. She was nominated again in 2016 for best female artist at the Vodafone Pacific Music awards.

Gibbons now resides in Sydney, working in the entertainment industry while working on new music.
