= Frankie Stevens =

New Zealand entertainer and singer

Frankie Stevens MNZM (né Francis Donald McKechnie Stevenson; born 1950) is a New Zealand entertainer and singer. He was a judge for all three seasons on the reality series New Zealand Idol.

== Early life and career ==
Born in Wellington in 1950 of Scottish and of Māori descent, Stevens is the brother of singer Jon Stevens. He got his start singing in a band while at Heretaunga College. He began his career at the age of 16, when he moved to Sydney, Australia to join a group called "Peter Nelson and the Castaways". After several years of touring and recording with the group, he went solo.

As a solo artist, his first record "My Elusive Dreams" in 1969 was a major hit in New Zealand.

The next year, he moved to London where he won the talent show Opportunity Knocks six times in a row, sang at both The Palladium and Albert Hall, represented Great Britain in several song contests, winning the Silver Prize in the Second Tokyo Music Festival, the Bronze Medal in Caracas Venezuela, and the Gold Medal at the Golden Orpheus Song Festival in Bulgaria.

Through the 1970s, he toured extensively, working with many major acts including Olivia Newton-John, Shirley Bassey, Milton Berle, and Sammy Davis Jr. and acting in Hawaii Five-O. played King Nikolas in the Hercules TV series.

== Return to New Zealand ==
In 1982, Stevens returned to New Zealand.

In 1994, he played the High Priest Caiaphas in the New Zealand tour of Jesus Christ Superstar, and later the '94-95' tour of Australia - with his younger brother Jon playing Judas.

From 2004, he was a judge on all three seasons on New Zealand Idol.

In the 2005 New Year Honours, Stevens was made a Member of the New Zealand Order of Merit, for services to entertainment.

Stevens has been honoured by his home town of Upper Hutt, which named a street in the suburb of Riverstone Terraces, Frankie Stevens Place, after the entertainer.

He is an ambassador of the Prostate Cancer Foundation of New Zealand.

In October 2015 he was presented with a Scroll of Honour from the Variety Artists Club of New Zealand for his contribution to the New Zealand entertainment industry.

In November 2024 he was presented with the Benny Award from the Variety Artists Club of New Zealand, the highest honour for a New Zealand variety entertainer.
