= James Marriott discography =

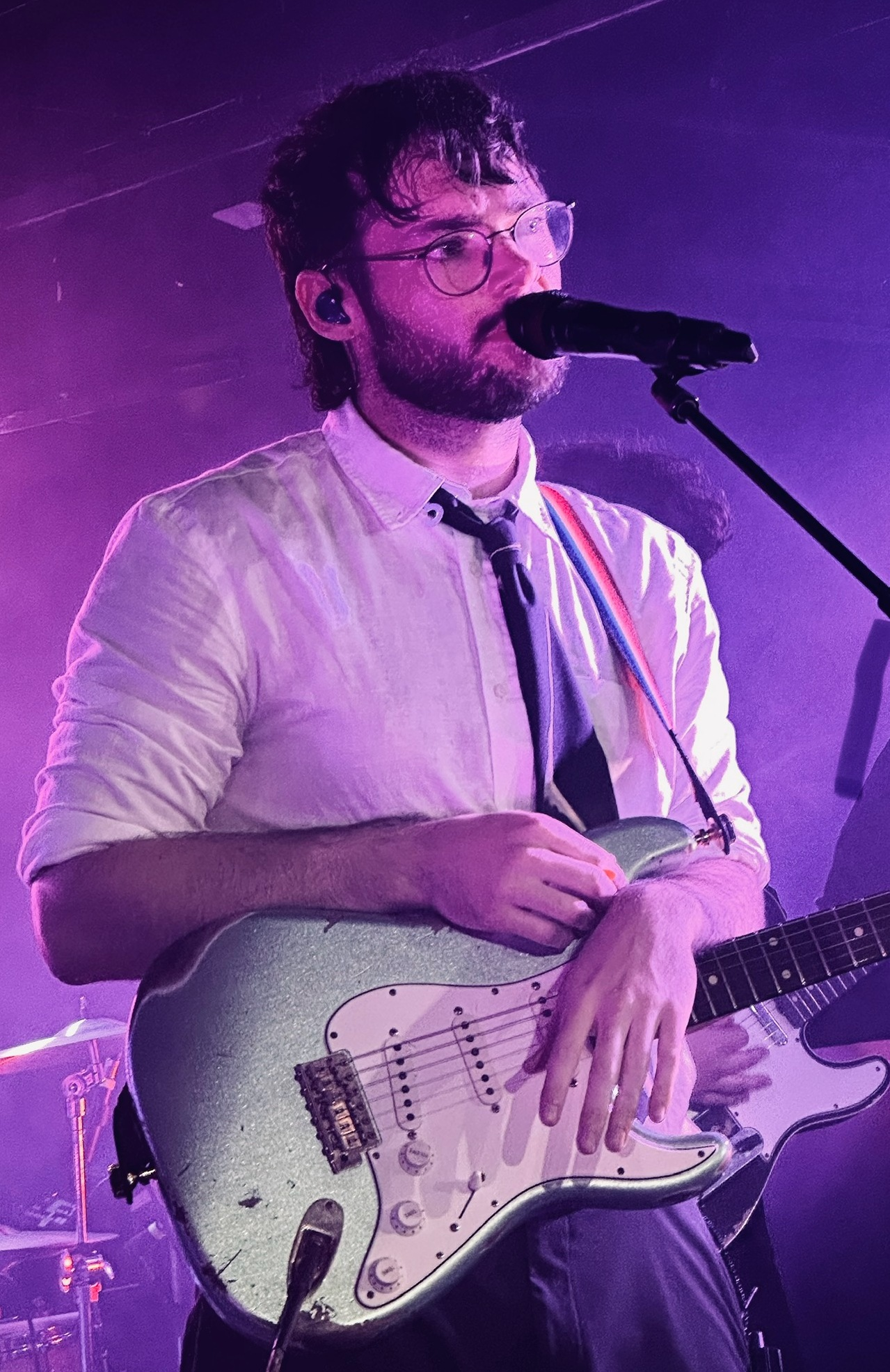
- Marriott performing in Leeds in 2024
- Studio albums: 3
- EPs: 2
- Singles: 16
- Music videos: 16

The following is a comprehensive discography of Swiss-born English musician and YouTuber James Marriott. His discography comprises three studio albums, two extended-plays and 16 singles, among others.

== Albums ==
=== Studio albums ===
List of studio albums, with selected details, peak chart positions and certifications
Title	Details	Peak chart positions				
Title	Details	UK	UK Indie	BEL (FL)	IRE	SCO
Are We There Yet?	Released: 10 November 2023; Formats: CD, digital download, LP, streaming; Label: Independent	17	2	—	—	7
Don't Tell The Dog	Released: 13 June 2025; Formats: Cassette, CD, digital download, LP, streaming; Label: AWAL	1	1	80	27	1
Warning Signs	To be released on: 15 January 2027; Formats: Cassette, CD, digital download, LP, streaming; Label: AWAL	—	—	—	—	—
"—" denotes a recording that did not chart or was not released in that territory.

== Extended-plays ==
Title	EP details	Peak chart positions	
Title	EP details	UK Indie	SCO
No Left Brain	Released: 15 January 2021; Format: Digital; Label: Independent	—	—
Bitter Tongues	Released: 24 June 2022 (digital); 29 November 2024 (vinyl); Label: Independent	4	9
"—" denotes recording did not chart in that territory.

== Singles ==
Title	Year	Peak chart positions			Album	Ref.
Title	Year	UK	LTU Air.	NZ Hot	Album	Ref.
"Slow Down"	2020	—	—	—	Non-album single	
"Him"	2021	—	—	—	No Left Brain	
"Wake Up!"	2021	—	—	—	Non-album single	
"Gold"	2021	—	—	—	Bitter Tongues	
"Sleeping on Trains"	2022	—	—	—	Bitter Tongues	
"Grapes"	2022	—	—	—	Bitter Tongues	
"So Long"	2023	—	—	—	Are We There Yet?	
"Romanticise This"	2023	—	—	—	Are We There Yet?	
"Don't Blame Me"	2023	—	—	—	Are We There Yet?	
"I Don't Want to Live Like This"	2025	67	—	31	Don't Tell the Dog	
"Toothache"	2025	—	—	—	Don't Tell the Dog	
"It's Only Love"	2025	—	—	37	Don't Tell the Dog	
"Something's Wrong"	2025	—	—	35	Don't Tell the Dog	
"California Rain"	2026	22	68	11	Non-album single	
"Burn Down the Disco"	2026	72	—	16	Warning Signs	
"Lovestruck"	2026	—	—	—	Warning Signs	
"Kiss"	2026	—	—	—	Warning Signs	
"—" denotes recording did not chart in that territory.

== Music videos ==
Title	Year	Director(s)	Album
"Him"	2021	Thomas Pearson; James Marriott	No Left Brain
"Wake Up!"	2021	Will Dawson	—N/a
"Gold"	2021	Ted Nivison	Bitter Tongues
"Sleeping on Trains"	2022	James Marriott	Bitter Tongues
"Grapes"	2022	James Marriott; Ash Kabosu	Bitter Tongues
"So Long"	2023	Kieran Wall	Are We There Yet?
"Romanticise This"	2023	Maya Katherine; Orr Piamenta	Are We There Yet?
"Don't Blame Me"	2023	James Marriott	Are We There Yet?
"I Don't Want to Live Like This"	2025	Orr Piamenta	Don't Tell The Dog
"Toothache"	2025	Orr Piamenta	Don't Tell The Dog
"It's Only Love"	2025	Orr Piamenta	Don't Tell The Dog
"Something's Wrong"	2025	Orr Piamenta	Don't Tell The Dog
"Pillow Fight"	2025	Ted Nivison	Don't Tell The Dog
"California Rain"	2026	Herbie Elton	—N/a
"Burn Down the Disco"	2026	Herbie Elton	Warning Signs
"Lovestruck"	2026	Herbie Elton	Warning Signs
