= Hannah Grae =

Welsh musician

- Born: Port Talbot, Wales
- Genre: Pop
- Occupation: Musician
- Years active: 2021–present
- Member of: Loud LDN
- Website: www.hannahgrae.com

Hannah Grae is a Welsh rock musician from Port Talbot, Wales. She is best known for her album Nothing Lasts Forever and 2025 single "Bitch", as well as her viral rock covers of popular songs.

== Early life ==
Grae was born in Port Talbot, Wales. Her parents worked as a drama teacher and in the film industry. Growing up, she was a fan of Hannah Montana, and from her, she became a fan of Taylor Swift. She was inspired to make her own music after watching an episode of Friends in which Phoebe Buffay wrote a song. Her first was a song called "The Chicken Song", followed by a series of acoustic piano-based songs.

In a September 2023 interview with Rolling Stone, she stated that her father had built an office that rapidly transformed into first a Ninjutsu studio and then a music studio. The family had to soundproof it after her brother's band took over the cabin, and Neath Port Talbot County Borough Council complained.

== Career ==
=== 2021-2022: Covers ===
Grae began her career by recording rock-based covers of popular songs, such as a version of Olivia Rodrigo's "Drivers License" from the perspective of the ex-boyfriend's new partner. In 2021, she uploaded an anti-sexual harassment parody of Aqua's "Barbie Girl" to YouTube and TikTok, which went viral on both platforms. Commenters shared their own stories of abuse; moved by the response, Grae began composing original music.

=== 2022-2024: Hell Is a Teenage Girl and Nothing Lasts Forever ===
Grae's debut single, released in September 2022, was "Propaganda", a song about the pressures of social media. In November, she released "Time of Your Life", a song about adolescent issues, alongside a video filmed in a Port Talbot comprehensive school. She then released the singles "I Never Say No" and "Hell Is a Teenage Girl", the latter of which took its name from a line in the film Jennifer's Body,. In April 2023, she released "Jaded", an attempt at writing about feelings of inferiority in relationships; all five singles appeared on her debut EP Hell Is a Teenage Girl, which she released later that month through Atlantic Records. After she finished writing Hell Is a Teenage Girl, she took a five-month break, during which time she moved to London. She resumed writing as a way of distracting herself from external pressures.

Grae's next single, "Screw Loose", was released on 25 August 2023, written about feelings of confusion in her new surroundings. The following day, Grae and Nieve Ella performed at Reading Festival. In September 2023, she released "It Could've Been You", a pop-punk record about heartbreak which had previously been teased on TikTok and gone viral, and which NME likened to Blink-182's "All the Small Things" with lyrics "similar to Paramore’s "Misery Business". A music video for the song was filmed at The George Tavern, and was released in October 2023. For Halloween, she released "Who Dunnit?", an experimental song about not being taken seriously accompanied by a music video, and in December 2023, she appeared on Dork's Hype List. She announced her debut album, Nothing Lasts Forever, in February 2024, and released "Better Now You're Gone" at the same time, releasing the album the month after. In May 2024, she released "New Temptation", which she wrote towards the end of writing Nothing Lasts Forever, and "Aeroplane Jelly". In November 2025, Grae stated she had been dropped from Atlantic and was now an independent artist, releasing her first independent single, "Bitch".

=== 2025-present: I Hate London and independence ===
Following her departure from Atlantic Records, Grae released her first independent EP, "I Hate London" in April of 2026. The EP's five songs were met with a positive reaction, popularized by its lead single "Bitch", a song about Grae's self-admitted jealousy. On 18 June 2026, Grae headlined her first independent show at Colours, Hoxton in conjunction with Dork's Night Out. The event was opened by special guest Precious Pepala and featured a full band.

On 17 September 2026, she performed alongside Chloe Slater as a supporting act for James Marriott's show at Brixton Academy O2.

== Artistic influences ==
Kayleigh Watson from The Line of Best Fit wrote that Grae's music was "littered with female influences, from Swift’s songwriting sentimentalities and melodic prowess to the energy of No Doubt" [sic], and sported "a powerful vocal dexterity that, at its highest reaches, carries echoes of [...] Hayley Williams and [...] Demi Lovato". Grae has cited that the honesty of Alanis Morissette has been a "huge influence".

Hell Is a Teenage Girl was largely inspired by Paramore, My Chemical Romance, Queen, and Taylor Swift. When writing "It Could've Been You", Grae described drawing from Bowling for Soup, Green Day, Paramore, American Hi-Fi, Avril Lavigne, Mean Girls and Shrek,. When writing "Who Dunnit?", she was initially inspired by "Heart of Glass" by Blondie. For some of her songs, she writes as her influences themselves, imagining what Swift or Morissette would write about a particular topic. She is a member of Loud LDN, a collective of London-based women and genderqueer musicians founded in May 2022.
