= Tako-no-yama =

Playground slide

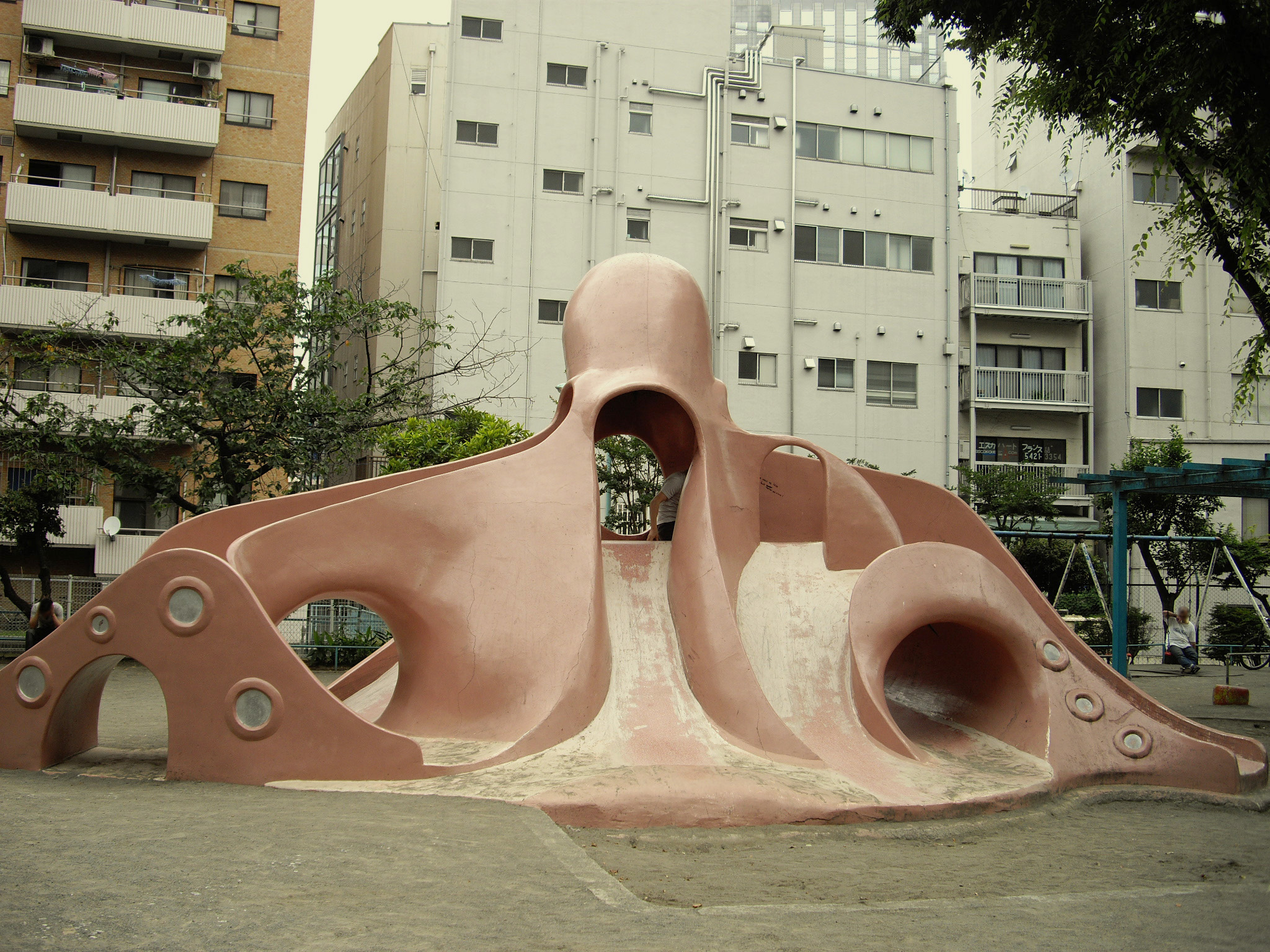
Tako-no-yama in Ebisu-Higashi Park (2009).

Tako-no-yama (タコの山, lit. 'octopus mountain') or octopus slide is a type of playground slide in Japan that has appearance of an octopus. Popularized by the company Maeda in the 1960s, tako-no-yama spread from Tokyo to all over Japan, and were even installed in Copenhagen, Denmark.

== History ==
Although the location of the first tako-no-yama is disputed, the most popular belief is that the first tako-no-yama was installed in 1965 in Shin-Nishiarai Park in Tokyo's Adachi Ward: an abstract playground design by a sculptor was rejected by the city council at first, but after he added the octopus theme it was accepted. Shin-Nishiarai is considered to be the oldest octopus slide in Japan. This slide is now decorated with space theme and won a design competition.

According to another theory, octopus slides in Japan became popular not because of the slide in Shin-Nishiarai Park, but because of octopus slides at Shinmei Children's Park in Shinagawa Ward. These slides were also installed by Maeda in 1968. Only one of the two slides has survived and is currently located in another park.

In 2019, Maeda sued Ans, a company that had installed two tako-no-yama, claiming that copyright of tako-no-yama belongs to them, and demanded 4.32 million yen. In 2022, the Supreme Court rejected their claim.

== Features ==
More than 260 tako-no-yama have been installed in Japan by Maeda. There are several types of tako-no-yama. For example, small-sized type is called "mini-octopus".

== Gallery ==
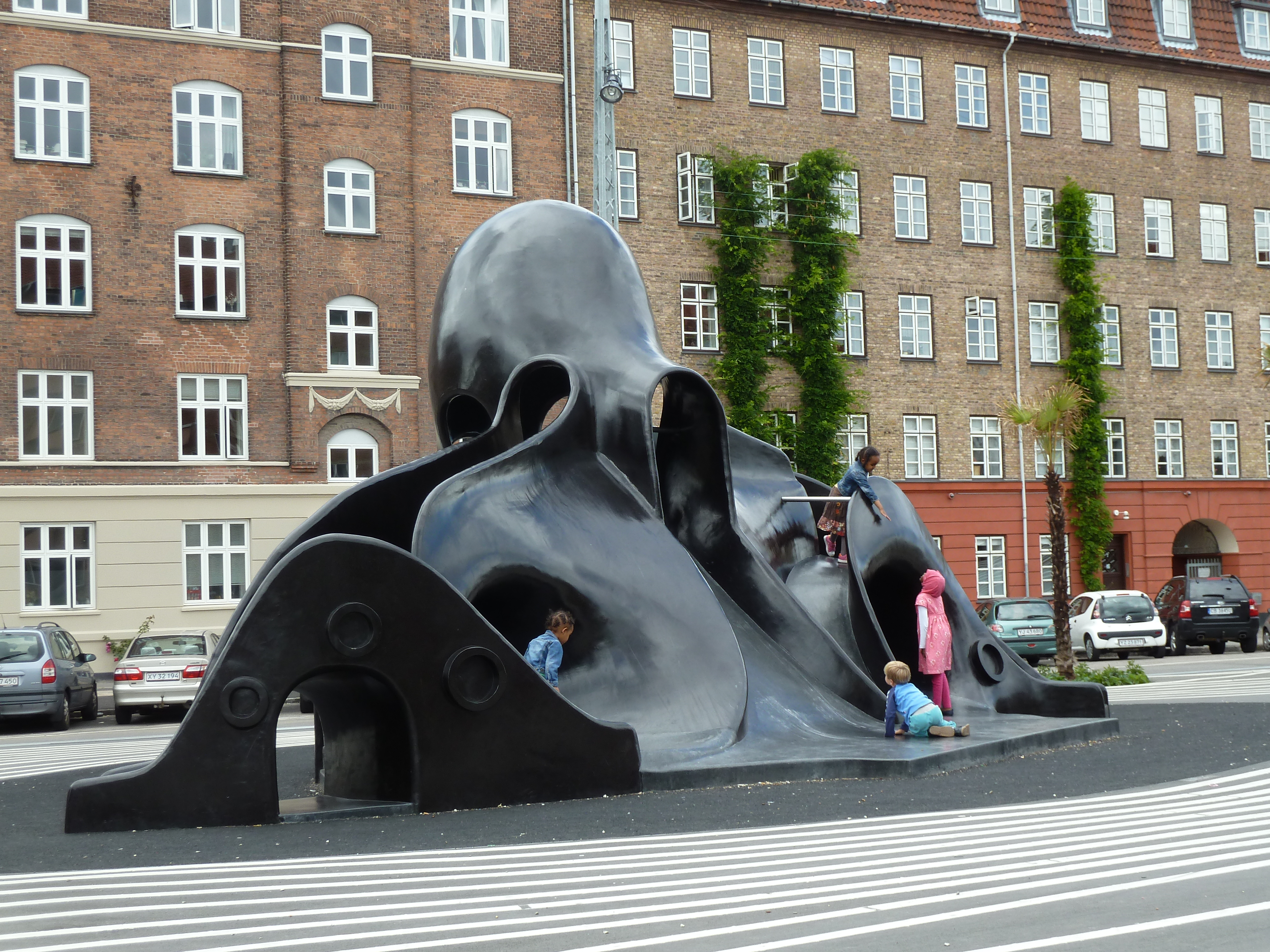
Octopus slide in Copenhagen

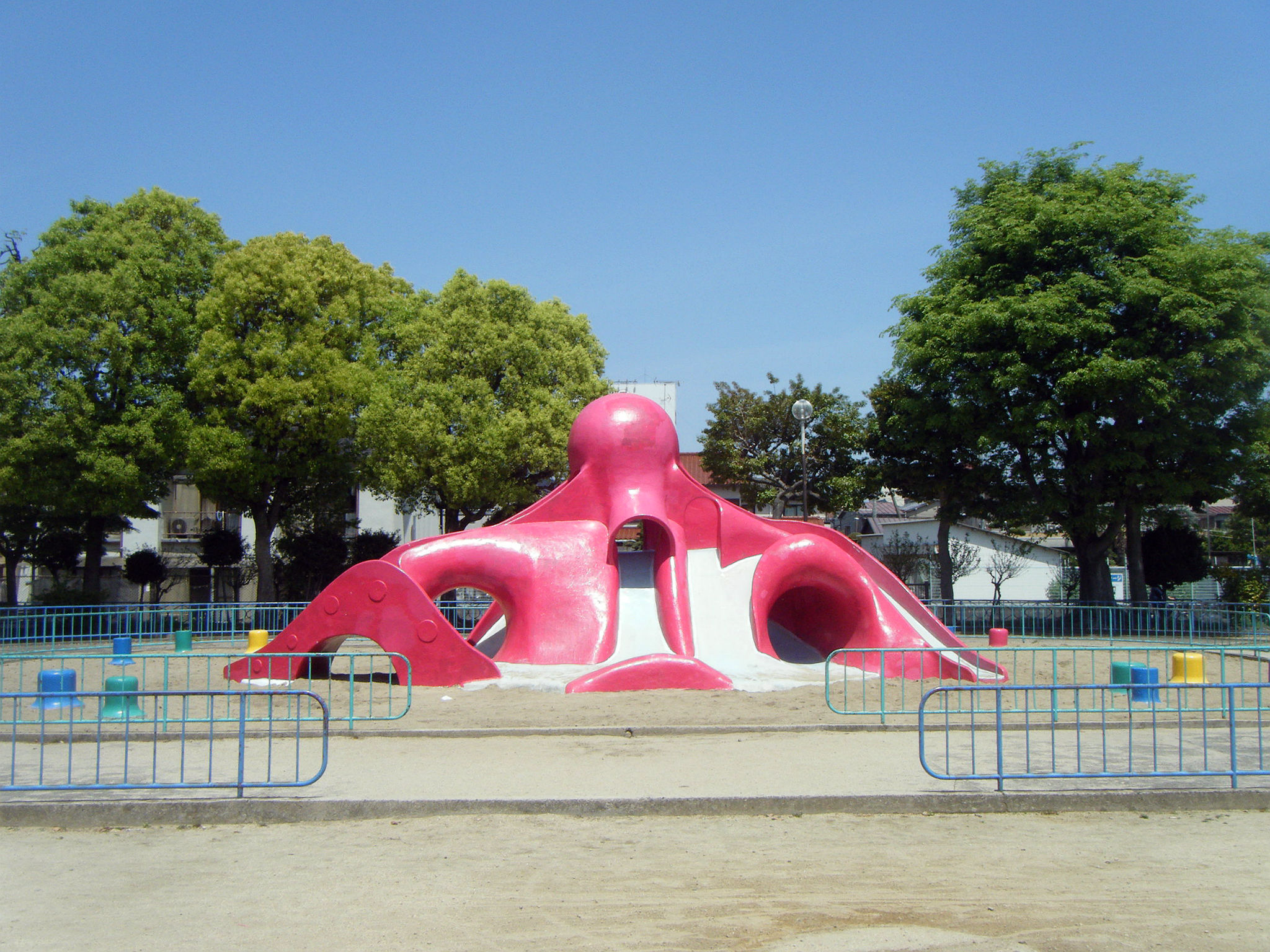
Tako-no-yama in Hyōgo Prefecture

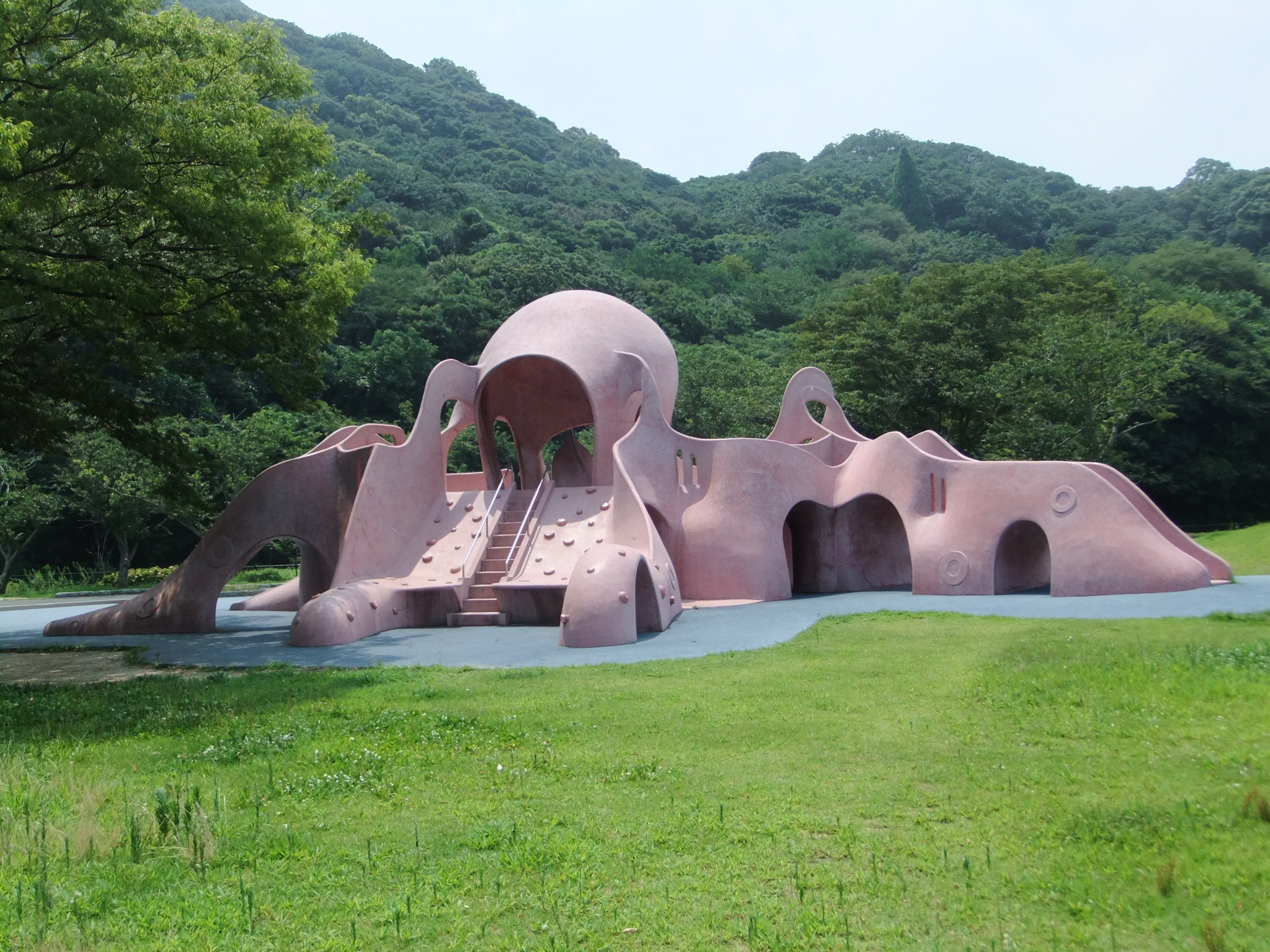
Tako-no-yama in Fukui Prefecture

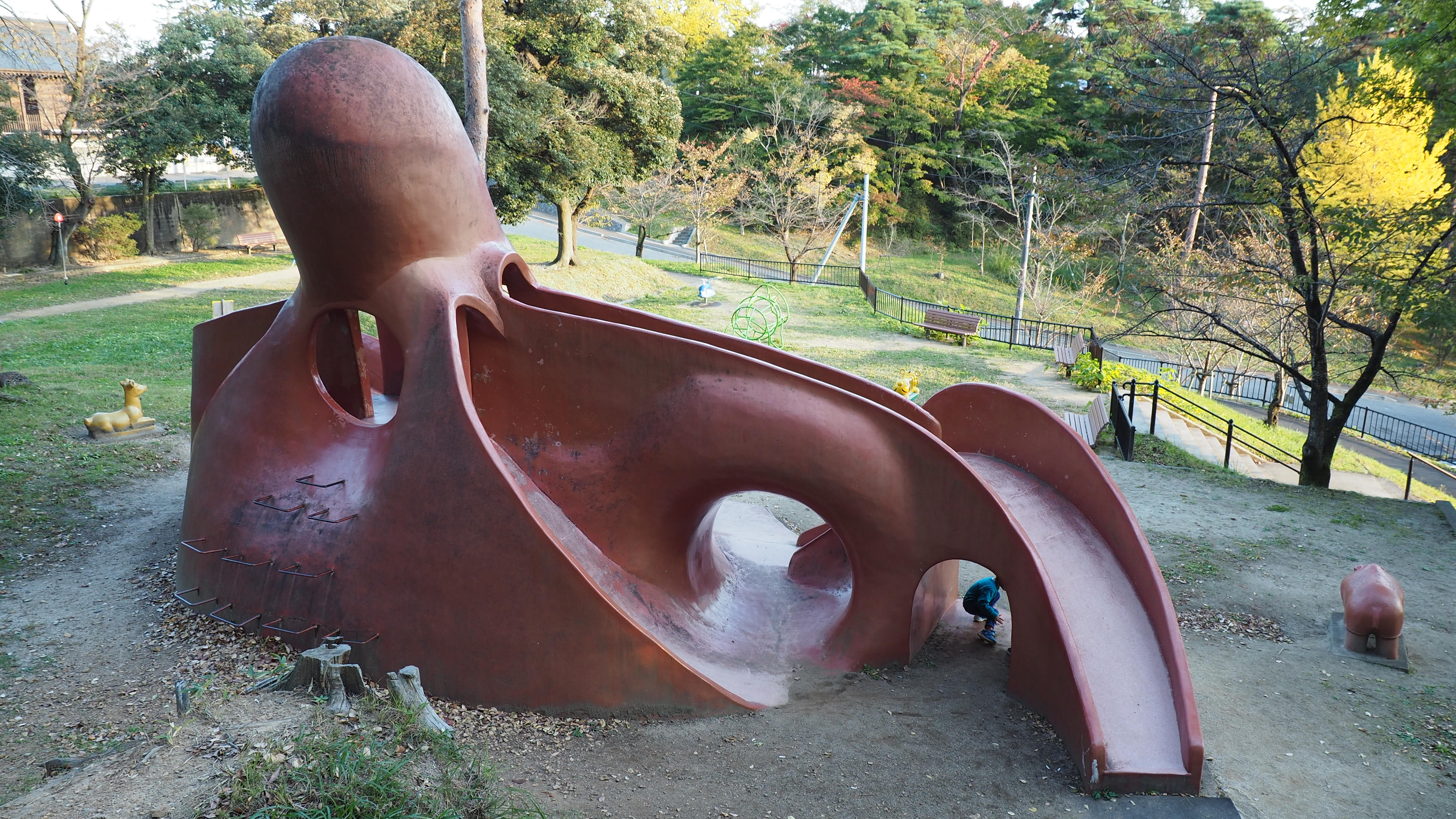
Tako-no-yama in Fukushima Prefecture

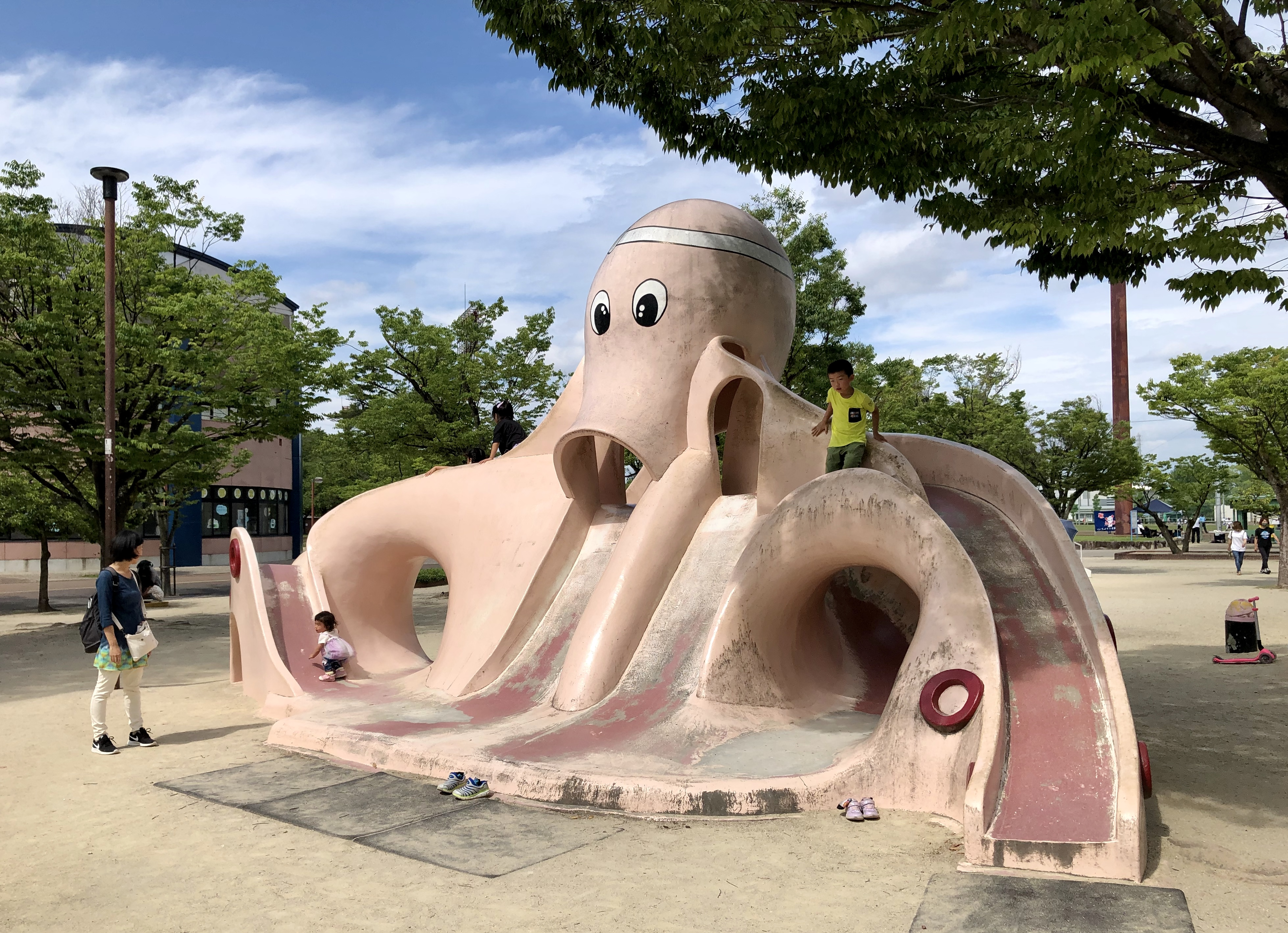
Tako-no-yama in Aichi Prefecture
