= Don't Tell the Dog =

Second studio album by James Marriott

Studio album by James Marriott
- Released: 13 June 2025
- Recorded: July 2024
- Studio: Big Jelly (Ramsgate)
- Genres: Alternative rock; indie pop; indie rock
- Length: 34:39
- Label: AWAL
- Producers: Aleksi Kiiskinen; James Marriott; Eeli Savolainen; Jono Suter

James Marriott chronology
Are We There Yet? (2023)	Don't Tell the Dog (2025)	Warning Signs (2027)

Singles from Don't Tell the Dog
- 1. "I Don't Want to Live Like This" Released: 30 January 2025; 2. "Toothache" Released: 20 March 2025; 3. "It's Only Love" Released: 16 May 2025; 4. "Something's Wrong" Released: 6 June 2025

Don't Tell the Dog is the second studio album by English indie rock musician James Marriott. Recorded in mid-2024, the album discussed childhood loss, breakups, anxiety, and unprocessed guilt. It featured the singles "I Don't Want to Live Like This", "Toothache", "It's Only Love", and "Something's Wrong". The album charted at No. 1 on the UK Albums Chart. It also topped the Official Vinyl Albums Chart and the Official Record Store Chart.

== Recording and production ==
Marriott's previous album Are We There Yet? had peaked at number 17 on the UK Albums Chart in 2023. He wrote his second album over the course of the following year while undergoing psychotherapy. Similar to his first album, Marriott wrote Don’t Tell The Dog in close collaboration with writing partners Jono Suter and Matt Gavin, who play keyboards and lead guitar on the album respectively. Marriott and his session band recorded it by July 2024 over three weeks at Big Jelly Studios in Ramsgate. In an interview with Dork, he described how he "wanted to take [the album] in a direction that was a little bit less indie-rock and more indie-pop" as he felt that parts of Are We There Yet? were slightly self-indulgent.

One track on the album sampled the squeaks of a nearby playground slide. "Plasticine" discussed his childhood hobby of making claymation models to process his loneliness, and had been considered for single release. "Toothache" had been written in the green room at Chalk in Brighton before Marriott's show that night. "I have this little snippet of it called 'phones on 1%'" he stated, "because I had a lyric, 'my phone was on 1%', which didn't make it, but the end of the song in that rough recording hasn't really changed since. That's always a good sign." "Limbs", the eleventh and final track on the album, had been purposefully left unfinished to evoke being broken.

== Themes ==
Don't Tell the Dog contains various references to childhood loss, breakups, and unprocessed guilt, and Marriott used the writing process to vocalize feelings he had been unable to process during therapy. The album's title took its name from an incident involving a childhood move in which his dog Jasper had been left behind. The cover featured a clay model of Jasper.

In an interview with Brig News, Marriott described the emotions that had driven his album, and how they manifested in his lyrics. "It feels like there is an intrinsic part of my brain that has always been built towards making other people feel emotions and how important that is for me," he stated. "['How Could I Say No'] is quite specifically about, how could I be a person that has that feeling and the fear of losing that. What if I get to a point where I can’t do that anymore? What if the negative side of it outweighs that at some point? I feel like I would feel incredibly lost. That song is about how no matter how bad it can be in the public eye, where you see every flaw you have, and every little feeling you have about yourself when you look in the mirror being amplified by people, how could I ever say no to this opportunity?"

== Release and reception ==
=== Commercial performance ===
The album's lead single, "I Don't Want to Live Like This", charted at No. 67 on the UK singles chart and No. 1 on the UK Singles Downloads Chart. He released the grunge track, "Toothache", as the album's second single in March 2025. He released a third single in May 2025, the indie folk track "It's Only Love", which was accompanied by a folk horror–inspired video featuring an axe throwing Marriott bringing scarecrow couples to life. He picked the track as a single to represent the second half of the album. "Something's Wrong" entered the UK singles chart update at No. 97.

Don't Tell the Dog was released on 13 June 2025. and charted at No. 1 on the UK Albums Chart, beating albums by Sabrina Carpenter and Oasis. It also topped the Official Vinyl Albums Chart and the Official Record Store Chart. The album was promoted with a string of in-store appearances.

=== Critical reception ===
Max Gayler from The Line of Best Fit wrote that the album "splits like a vinyl record: Side A filled with narrative vignettes, Side B drifting into uncertainty". Gayler was struck by how deeply Marriott was willing to excavate and described the album as "jagged, unvarnished, and quietly devastating". The Official Charts Company described the album as "playful yet profound" and "anchored by Marriott's signature introspective lyricism and theatrical flair", and wrote that its blue dog artwork was "a symbol of the album's balance between personal chaos and creative clarity".

== Track listing ==
All tracks are written by Aleksi Kiiskinen, James Marriott, and Jono Suter, with additional writers noted.

Don't Tell the Dog track listing
No.	Title	Writer(s)	Length
1.	"Ventriloquist"	Jere Särkkä; Louis Salanson	2:50
2.	"Something's Wrong"	Samuel Horsley; Eirik Næss; Salanson; Charlie Sale; Särkkä; Eeli Savolainen; Jago Shakoori	3:20
3.	"Plasticine"	Horsley; Savolainen; Kieran Shudall	3:02
4.	"It's Only Love"	Matthew Gavin; Samuel Horsley; Salanson; Savolainen	3:31
5.	"Food Poisoning"	Gavin; Næss; Salanson; Särkkä; Savolainen	3:05
6.	"Toothache"	Gavin; Horsley; Salanson; Savolainen	3:17
7.	"I Don't Want to Live Like This"	Gavin; Horsley; Salanson; Savolainen	2:54
8.	"How Could I Say No?"	Gavin; Horsley; Salanson; Savolainen	3:30
9.	"Pillow Fight"	Gavin; Horsley; Salanson; Särkkä; Savolainen	3:00
10.	"Why Don't You Kill Me?"	Gavin; Horsley; Salanson; Särkkä; Savolainen	2:40
11.	"Limbs"	Gavin; Horsley; Ossi Maristo; Salanson; Savolainen	3:24
Total length:			34:39

Digital deluxe edition
No.	Title	Length
12.	"Staring at the Sun"	3:27
13.	"Don't Tell the Dog"	3:15
14.	"Best Friend"	2:54
15.	"Wish You Were There"	2:36
16.	"Can I See You"	1:58
17.	"Ventriloquist" (demo)	3:06
18.	"Something's Wrong" (demo)	3:03
19.	"Plasticine" (demo)	1:19
20.	"It's Only Love" (demo)	3:43
21.	"Food Poisoning" (demo)	2:52
22.	"Toothache" (demo)	3:27
23.	"I Don't Want to Live Like This" (demo)	0:37
24.	"How Could I Say No?" (demo)	3:43
25.	"Pillow Fight" (demo)	2:43
26.	"Why Don't You Kill Me?" (demo)	2:35
27.	"Limbs" (demo)	2:48

=== Notes ===
- Tracks 13–16 are subtitled "(Scrapped)"

== Personnel ==
Standard edition credits adapted from the album's liner notes.

Marriott Band

- James Marriott – lead vocals, backing vocals, guitar, production; synthesised elements, programming (tracks 1, 3, 6, 7, 10)
- Jono Suter – production (all tracks), backing vocals (1–3, 6, 7, 10); synthesised elements, programming (1, 6, 7, 10); organ (2, 8), piano (3, 7), keyboard (4)
- Matt Gavin – guitar (1–9)
- Louis Salanson – recording assistance (all tracks), backing vocals (3, 6, 7), drums (11)
- Samuel Horsley – bass guitar (all tracks), backing vocals (6, 7)

=== Other personnel ===
- Aleksi Kiiskinen – percussion, synthesised elements, programming, production, engineering (all tracks); slide (2), backing vocals (5–7), drums (11)
- Jesse Vainio – mixing
- Matias Koskimies – mixing assistance
- Svante Forsbäck – mastering
- Eeli Savolainen – drums, engineering (2–11); production (2–7, 9–11)
- Sevina Lee – backing vocals (3, 6, 7)
- Sam McMahon – backing vocals (3)
- Kieran Shudall – synthesised elements, programming (3)
- Ossi Maristo – guitar (4), lap steel (11)
- Jere Särkkä – synthesised elements, programming (10)
- Rhianna Berthoud – illustration, clay artwork

== Charts ==
Chart performance for Don't Tell the Dog
Chart (2025)	Peak position
Belgian Albums (Ultratop Flanders)	80
Irish Albums (Official Charts)	27
Scottish Albums (Official Charts)	1
UK Albums (Official Charts)	1
UK Independent Albums (Official Charts)	1
