= Chloe Slater =

English singer-songwriter (born 2003)

- Born: Chloe Leanne Slater; 3 March 2003 (age 23); Bournemouth, England
- Occupations: Singer-songwriter; musician
- Musical career
- Genre: Indie rock
- Instruments: Vocals; guitar
- Years active: 2023–present
- Label: Stolen Juice (AWAL)
- Website: chloeslater.co.uk

Chloe Leanne Slater (born 2003) is an English singer-songwriter based in Manchester. Writing about social and political issues, she has been releasing music since 2023 and has issued two extended plays: You Can't Put a Price on Fun, and Love Me Please.

== Early life ==
Chloe Leanne Slater was born in 2003 and raised by a single mother in Bournemouth, England. Inspired by Taylor Swift, she started playing acoustic guitar at the age of 13, and then electric guitar. Slater took an interest in politics during the 2019 United Kingdom election campaign. At age 18, she moved to Manchester to pursue a music degree. She later dropped out.

== Career ==
Slater released her debut single, "Sinking Feeling!", in 2023. She started promoting her music on TikTok, and the clips for her second single "24 Hours", a "scathing takedown of influencer culture," went viral on the platform. Her debut extended play (EP), You Can't Put a Price on Fun, was issued in May 2024 via Stolen Juice, an imprint of AWAL. She issued a follow-up, Love Me Please, in February 2025. In June 2026, Slater released "Southern Youth" as the lead single to her debut album Riot Youth. The album is scheduled to release on October 9, 2026.

On 17 September 2026, she performed alongside Hannah Grae as a supporting act for James Marriott's show at Brixton Academy O2.

On 7 October 2026, Slater performed a live "Sofa Session" for Jo Whiley's evening show, which was broadcast on BBC Radio 2.

== Artistic influence ==
Some of Slater's most popular songs have been written in protest, inspired by Sam Fender and Declan McKenna's political music. She occasionally uses satire in her lyrics. The intention of her music is to engage young people in social and political issues, and to create a "stepping stone to [start] to think more about the world that we live in." Her second EP explores themes of influencer culture, feminism, and social class. Other musical acts Slater admires include Fontaines D.C., Wolf Alice, Arctic Monkeys and Bloc Party.

== Discography ==
=== Studio albums ===
- Riot Youth (2026)

=== Extended plays ===
● You Can't Put a Price on Fun (Stolen Juice via AWAL, 23 May 2024)

No.	Title	Length
1.	"24 Hours"	3:39
2.	"Nothing Shines on This Island"	2:09
3.	"Price on Fun"	3:22
4.	"Death Trap"	2:39
5.	"Thomas Street"	2:51
Total length:		14:42

● Love Me Please (Stolen Juice via AWAL, 4 February 2025)

No.	Title	Length
1.	"Tiny Screens"	2:58
2.	"Sucker"	2:38
3.	"Fig Tree"	3:41
4.	"We're Not the Same"	2:40
5.	"Imposter"	2:33
Total length:		14:31

=== Singles ===
- "Harriet" (AWAL, 30 July 2025)
- "War Crimes" (Stolen Juice via AWAL, 5 November 2025)
- "Ugly" (Stolen Juice via AWAL, 15 May 2026)
- "Southern Youth" (AWAL, 12 June 2026)
- "Mother Nature's Killing Spree" (Stolen Juice via AWAL, 24 July 2026)
