= Precious Pepala =

British singer-songwriter

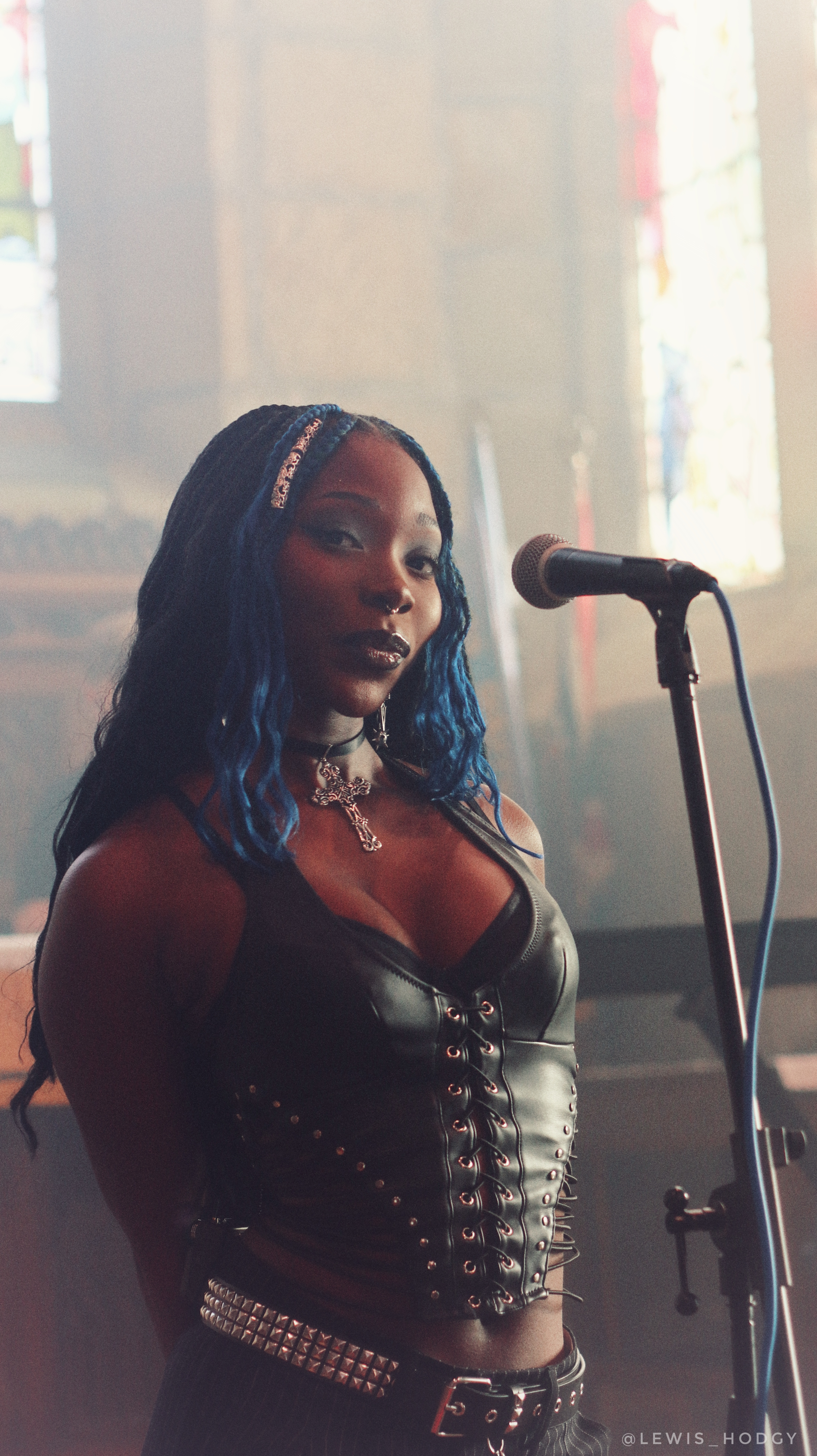
- Precious Pepala in 2025

Background information
- Born: February 12, 2005 (age 21); Sheffield, United Kingdom
- Genres: Pop rock; alternative; R&B; soul music
- Occupations: Singer; songwriter
- Years active: 2021—present
- Website: shoppreciouspepala.com

Precious Pepala (born February 12, 2005) is an Zambian-English singer-songwriter from Sheffield whose work focuses on dark pop, rock, alternative pop, indie rock, R&B, and soul music. Her lyrics are centered around religious trauma, romance and the difficulties of maintaining relationships, doubt, and her struggles with mental health.

Precious first began publishing independently-written songs in 2021 and has amassed approximately 37 million streams globally since then.

== Early life ==
Pepala was born in Sheffield, England to Zambian parents where she spoke Bemba at home. Her father is a pastor. At 10 years old, Precious joined her church choir, where she first discovered her love for singing and her foundations of kindness & honesty.

== Career ==
Pepala's first public recognition happened in 2021 when she was only 17 years old; her TikTok cover of the song Water Fountain by Alec Benjamin went viral, gaining 2.3 million views. Around the time of her viral video's peak in fame, Pepala's first contributions in the music industry came the same year with her singles "Stay" and "Water Fountain", but her first "debut" single released in 2022, titled "My Eyes Only". Her fourth single "Looking for Trouble" released that same year through Darkroom Records, with the intent of discussing rape culture and victim blaming.

Her fifth single, "Voices", released mid year in 2022, focused on the mental health spectrum and how losing control can be fearful. In an interview with NYLON, Pepala explained that the lyrics of the song was focused on the feelings of being left alone with your own thoughts. She also says she thinks lots of people must have related to her and her songs at some point, and how after pandemic, peoples lives were flipped upside down. The song was also included in Rolling Stone's Songs You Need To Know This Week.

By March 2023, Precious released "Pls Cheat On Me"-- a complex song about Precious' desire to have a reason to leave a relationship she wasn't content with without her being painted as the villain in the end-- which received more than 18 million streams as of November 2026, and has since been her most popular song out of all of her discography. In May, she released "Bubble Wrap", followed by "Fifth" in July, and finally, her very first EP, "Eve", in September-- which also featured "Pls Cheat on Me", "My Eyes Only", "Looking For Trouble", "Fifth", "Voices", and the as-of-release new songs "Familiar Stranger" and "231."

In early-to-late April 2024, Precious released "Death of the Party" and "Death of the Party (OG Version)" near back-to-back, then "Thumb War" and "Thumb War (Remix)" in May and June of that year. In August, she released "Unreal", followed by "The Effect"-- which mimicked the "My Eyes Only" album cover-- in October, then featured it again in November with the release of "Sunday Morning".

In January 2025, Precious released her seventeenth single titled "Lullaby". By March, she released the single "First Love", co-written and co-produced with Eg White and Jordan Rabjohn under Modern Sky UK. The single talks about the other side of romance, the grief, jealousy and guilt. Later that year, she released her second EP "Dark Days", making it her stay in the label.

By July 2025, Precious released "Church Live Sessions", her first live performance recorded & published for streaming and her third EP, where she performed her religious trauma-adjacent songs "Eve", "Bubble Wrap", and "Sunday Morning", alongside "The Effect" inside of the St Nicholas Church of High Bradfield, England. In November, she released "Dream Cheater".

As of 2026, Precious had released two more singles-- "Love Bombs" and "Too Good to Die"-- and her fourth EP, "Rosey", which featured the aforementioned singles that released that year, the titular "Rosey," "Dream Cheater", and "The After".

== Discography ==
=== Singles ===
- Stay (2021)
- Water Fountain (2021)
- My Eyes Only (2022)
- Looking for Trouble (2022)
- Voices (2022)
- Pls Cheat On Me (2023)
- Bubble Wrap (2023)
- Fifth (2023)
- Death of the Party (2024)
- Thumb War (2024)
- Thumb War – Remix (2024)
- Unreal (2024)
- Sunday Morning (2024)
- The Effect (2024)
- Lullaby (2025)
- First Love (2025)
- Dream Cheater (2025)

=== EPs ===
- Eve (2023)
- Dark Days (2025)
- Church Live Sessions (2025)
- Rosey (2026)
