= Playground slide =

Slides for children to play on in playgrounds

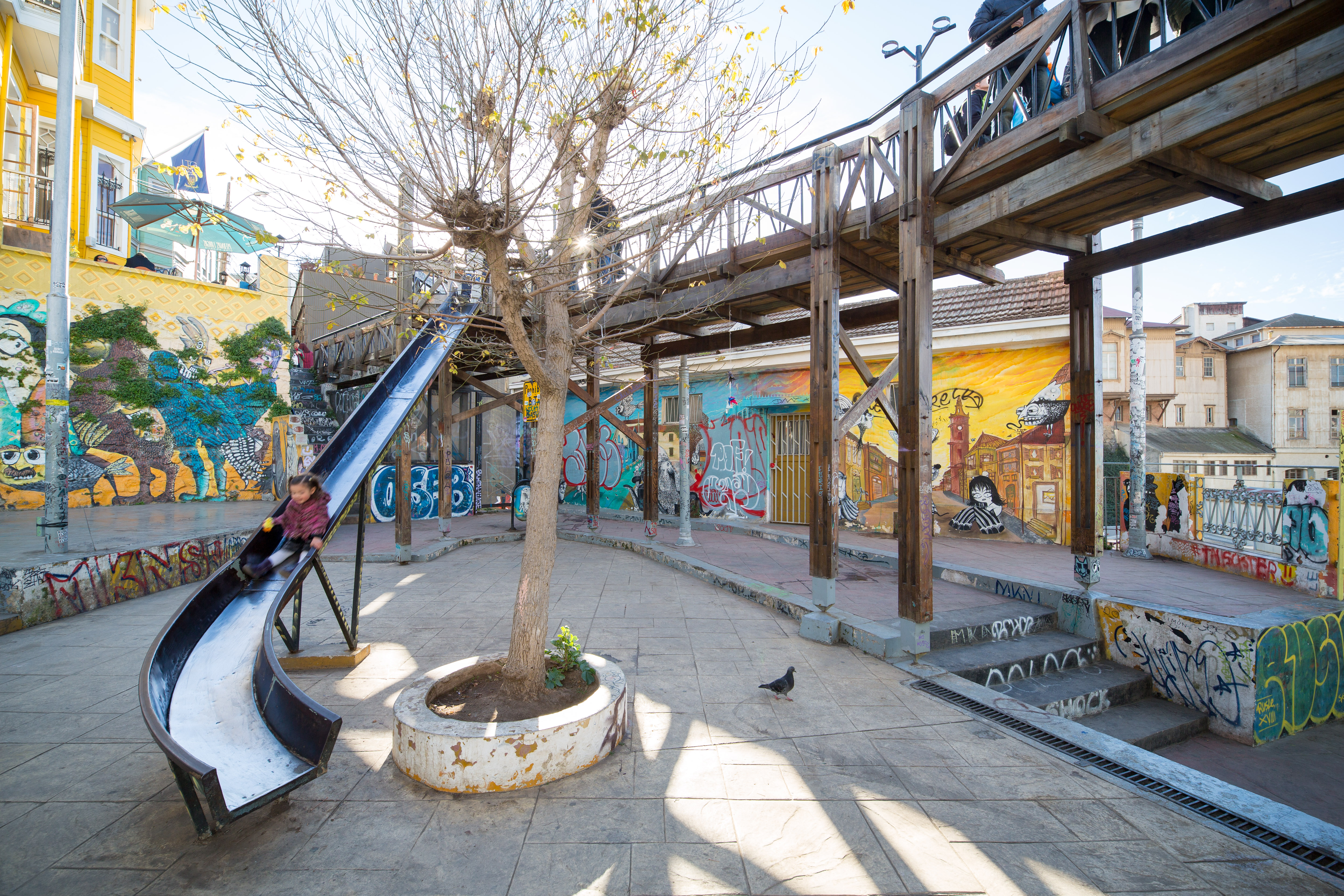
Slide in Valparaíso as an integral part of the square architecture

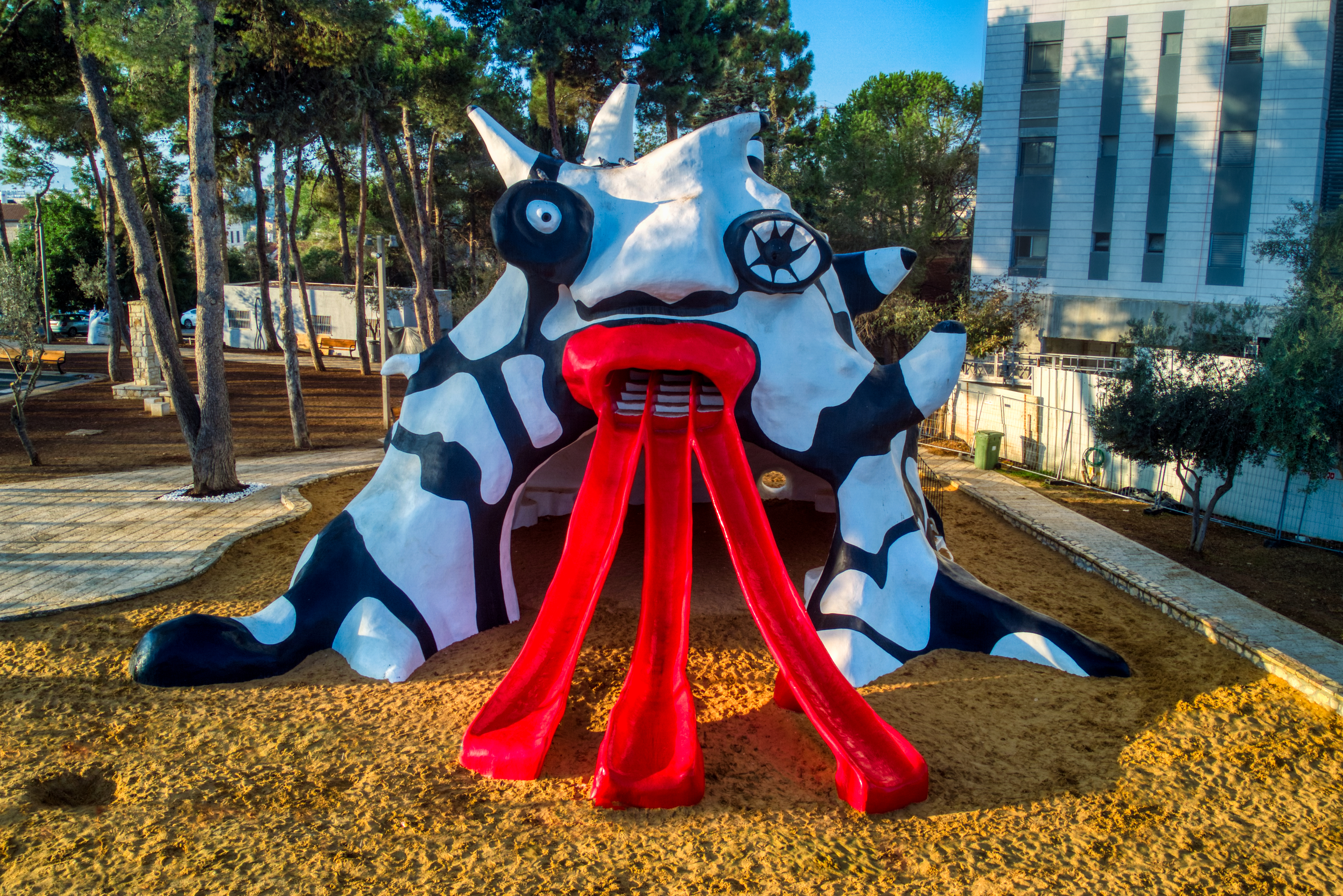
"The Golem" – a giant monster with three red tongues protruding from its mouth, which serve as playground slides, Jerusalem, made by the sculptor Niki de Saint Phalle

Playground slides are found in parks, schools, playgrounds and backyards. The slide is an example of the simple machine known as the inclined plane, which makes moving objects up and down easier, or in this case more fun. The slide may be flat, or half cylindrical or tubular to prevent falls. Slides are usually constructed of plastic, metal, and sometimes concrete. They have a smooth surface called a 'slide bed' that is either straight for the full length or can contain bends. The user, typically a child, climbs to the top of the slide via a ladder or stairs and sits down on the top of the slide and slides down the chute.

In Australia, the playground slide is known as a slide, slippery slide, slipper slide or slippery dip depending on the region. Sliding board is used in the Philadelphia area and other parts of the Mid-Atlantic United States.

== History ==
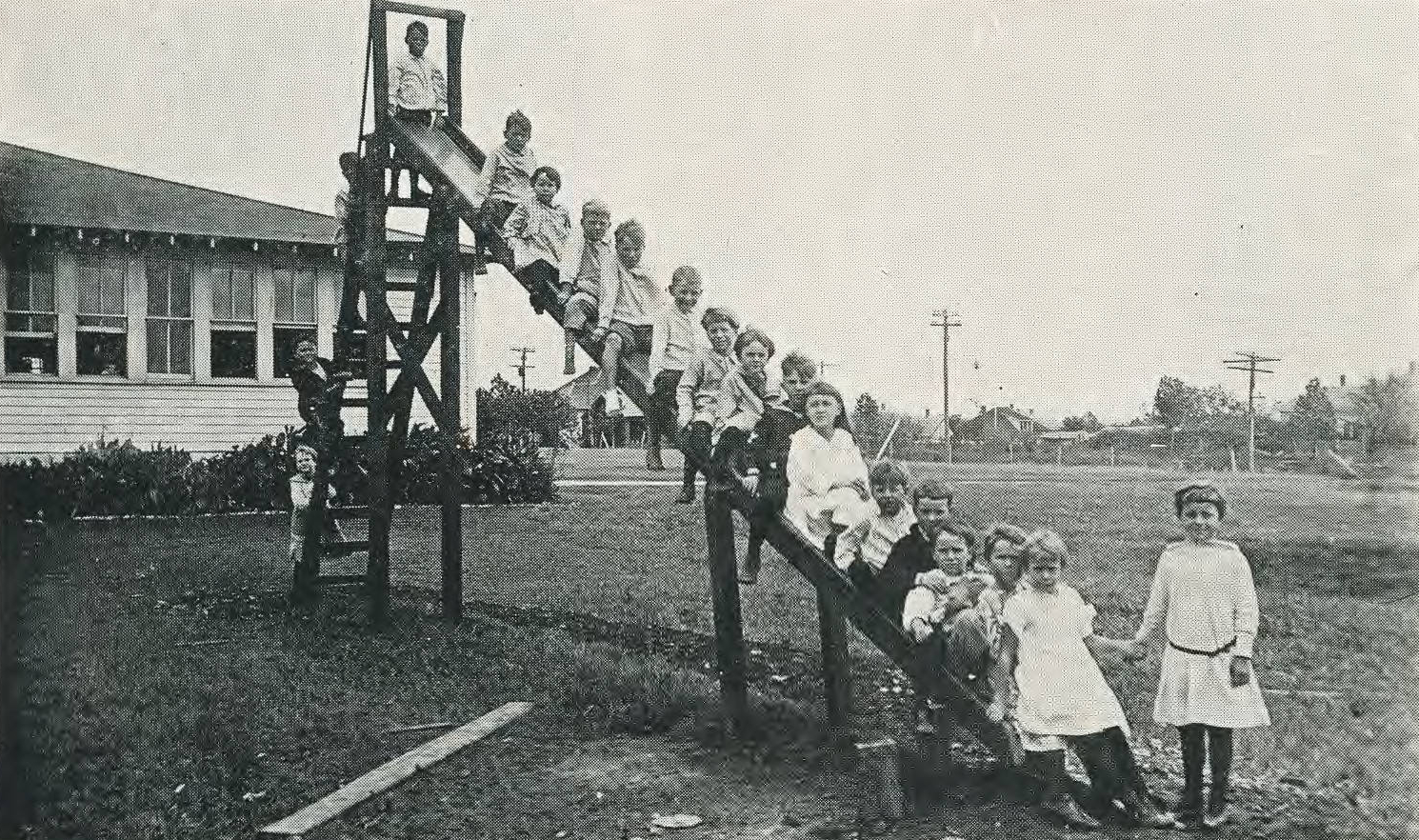
Schoolchildren on a slide at the East Texas State Normal College Training School in 1921

The earliest known playground slide was erected in the playground of Washington, D.C.'s "Neighborhood House" sometime between the establishment of the "Neighborhood House" in early 1902 and the publication of an image of the slide on August 1, 1903, in Evening Star (Washington DC). The first bamboo slide at Coney Island opened for business in May 1903, so it is unclear which slide was first – the playground slide or the amusement park slide.

Early slides were frequently referred to as "Slide, Kelly, Slide" (after the song of the same name), "Helter Skelter" (after the slide at Coney Island), or "Shoot the Chutes" (after the water slide made famous by "Captain" Paul Boyton).

The manufacturer, Wicksteed, ballyhoo claim that the playground slide was invented by founder, Charles Wicksteed, and installed in Wicksteed Park in 1922, The discovery of Wicksteed's oldest slide was announced by the company in 2013.

However, this has been countered by a 1916-07-25 US Patent and others who refer to a rooftop slide in NYC c. 1900, the nursery slide of the young Tsarevich Alexei, at Alexander Palace in Tsarkoye Selo built around 1910, the 45-foot (13.7 m) slide at the Smith Memorial Playground in Philadelphia, which was installed in 1904 (renovated and reopened in 2005), or the Coney Island Slide around 1905.

Indeed, Arthur Leyland's book "Playground Technique and Playcraft", volume 1, originally published in 1909 and revised in 1913, gives full instructions for the construction of a metal playground slide.

== Types ==
Here is a list of different slide types:

- A spiral slide is a playground slide that is wrapped around a central pole to form a descending spiral forming a simple helter skelter.
- A wavy slide is a slide that has waves in its shape, causing the person sliding to go up and down slightly while descending.
- A tube slide is simply a slide in the form of a tube. It can also curve or have bumps.
- A straight slide is a flat slide that just goes down at a slight angle.
- A roller slide is a slide made of horizontal cylinders which spin underneath the person sliding as they travel down.
- Amusement-park slides are just larger versions of the playground slide, much higher and with multiple parallel slideways. Participants may be provided with a sack to sit on to reduce friction for higher speeds and to protect clothing.
- Drop slides are slides with a vertical or nearly vertical drop (nicknamed the death slide or free-fall slide).
- Water slides are a type of slide that water streams down to create a slippery slide; found near water, generally in water parks or pools.
- Inflatable slides are a type of slide that is continuously blown up by an exterior blower. The air flow allows the slide to be softer than traditional slides. They are also used on airplanes during an emergency evacuation, where they are known as evacuation slides.
- An ice slide is a type of slide that is made with ice.

There are several other different types and styles of slides.

Slides can also be sub-classified as either free-standing slides, slides that stand on their own, or composite slides, which are slides that are connected to another or several pieces of playground equipment.

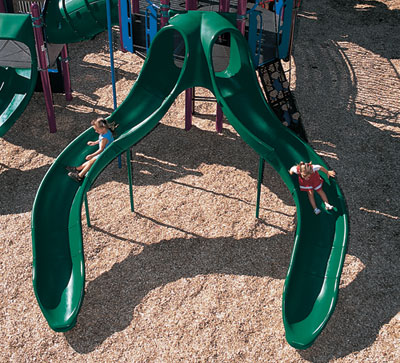
Two-slide play system

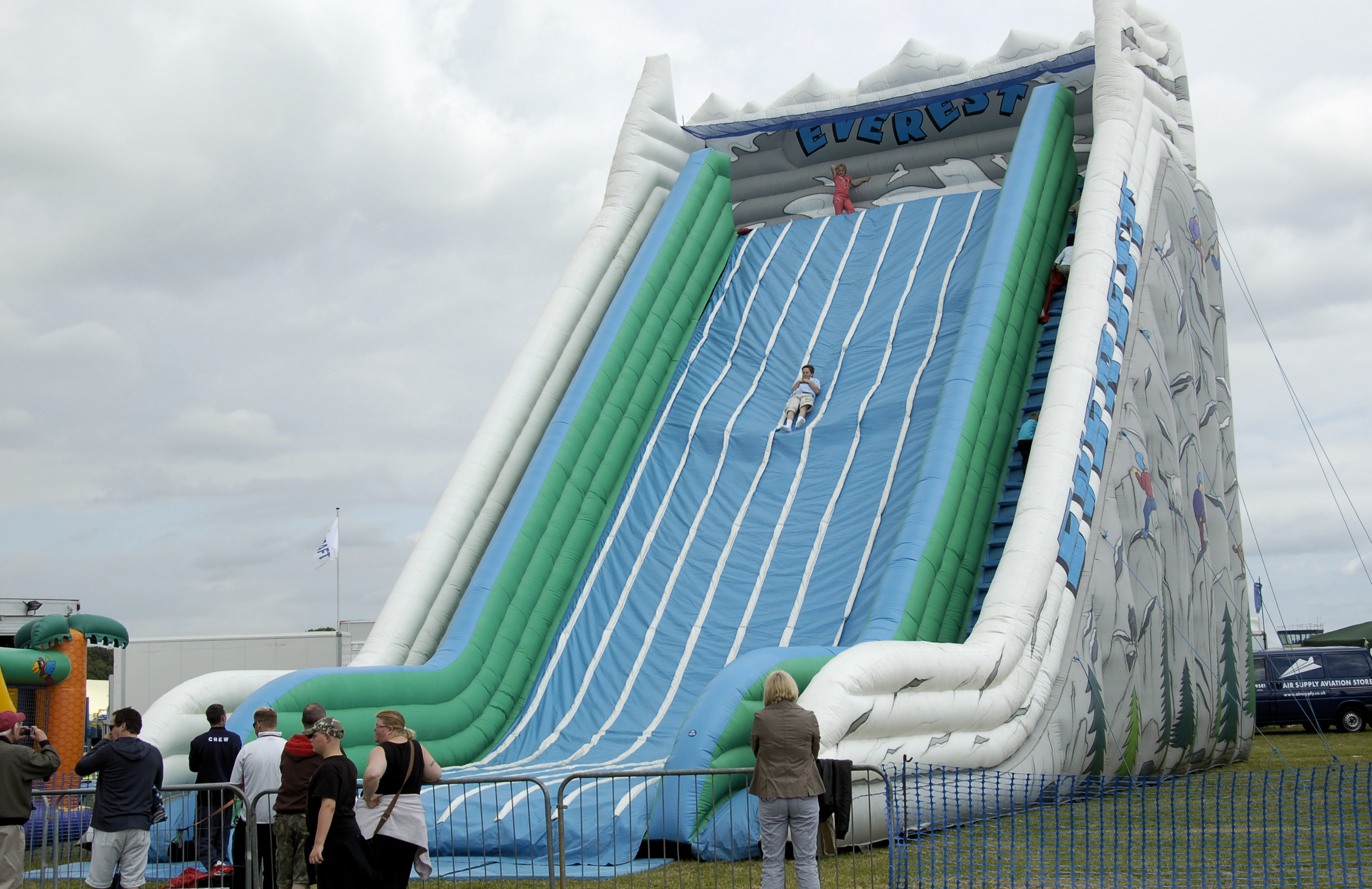
An inflatable slide at an air show in England

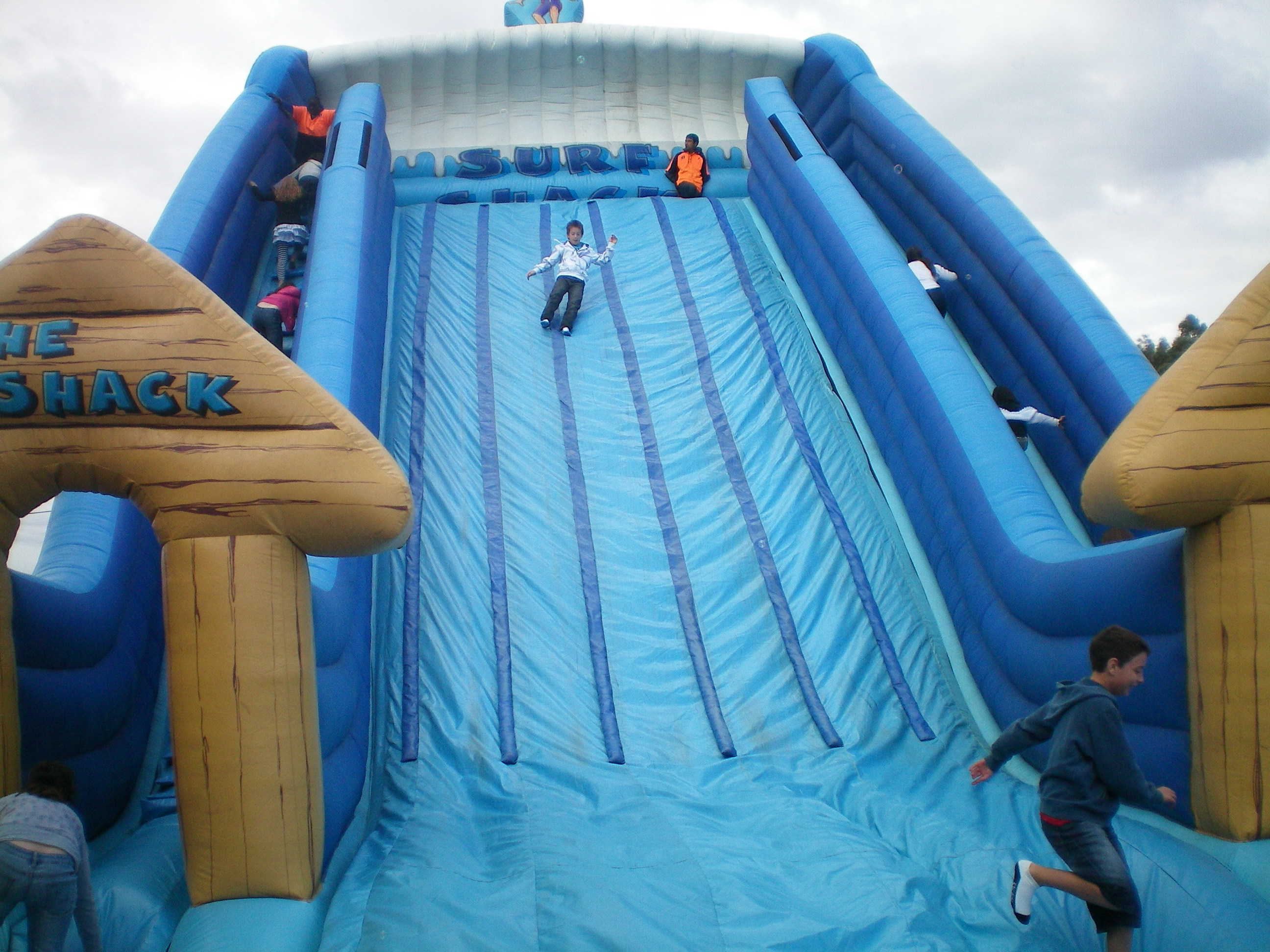
At a community festival in Australia

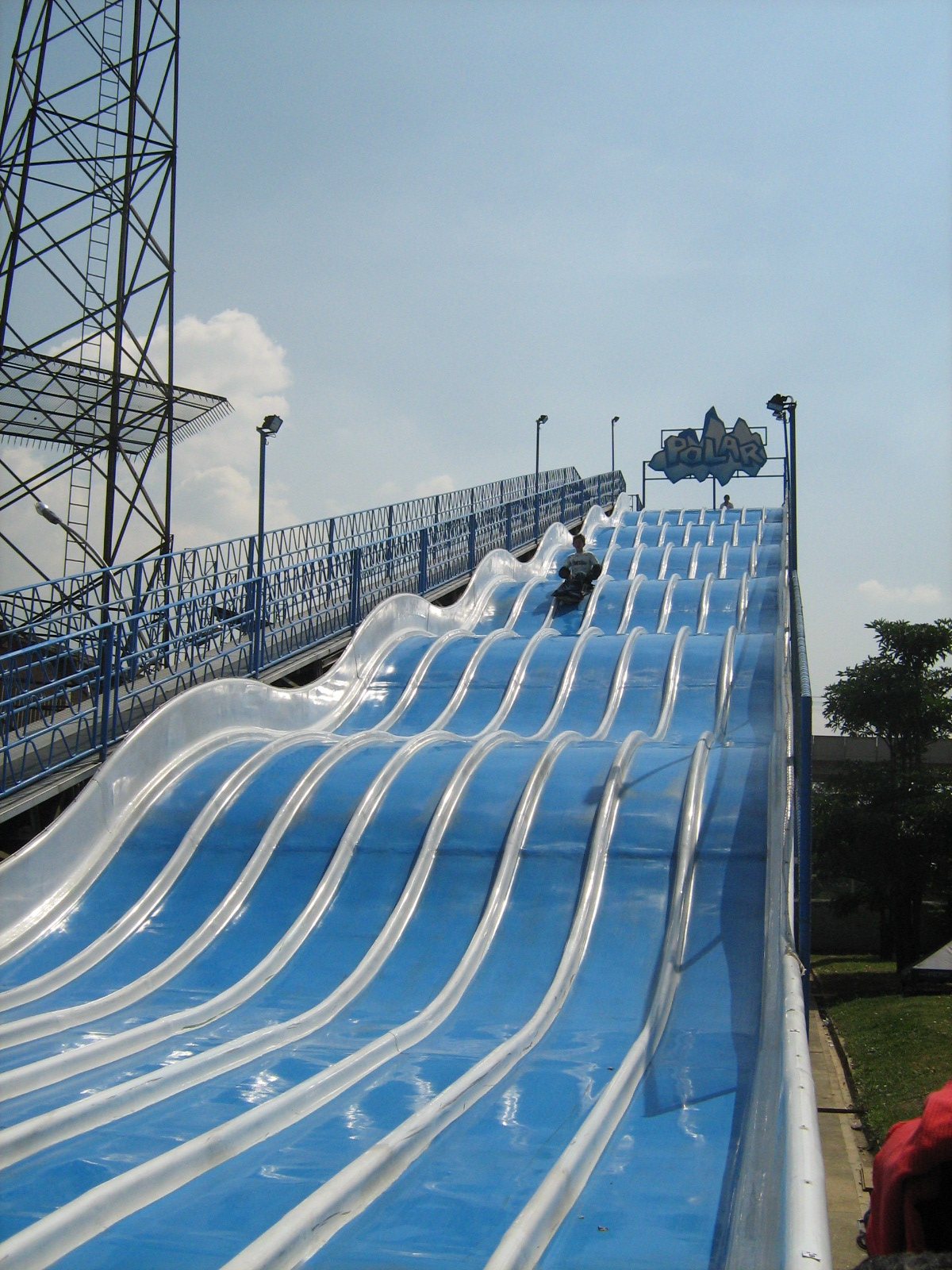
An amusement-park slide in Colombia

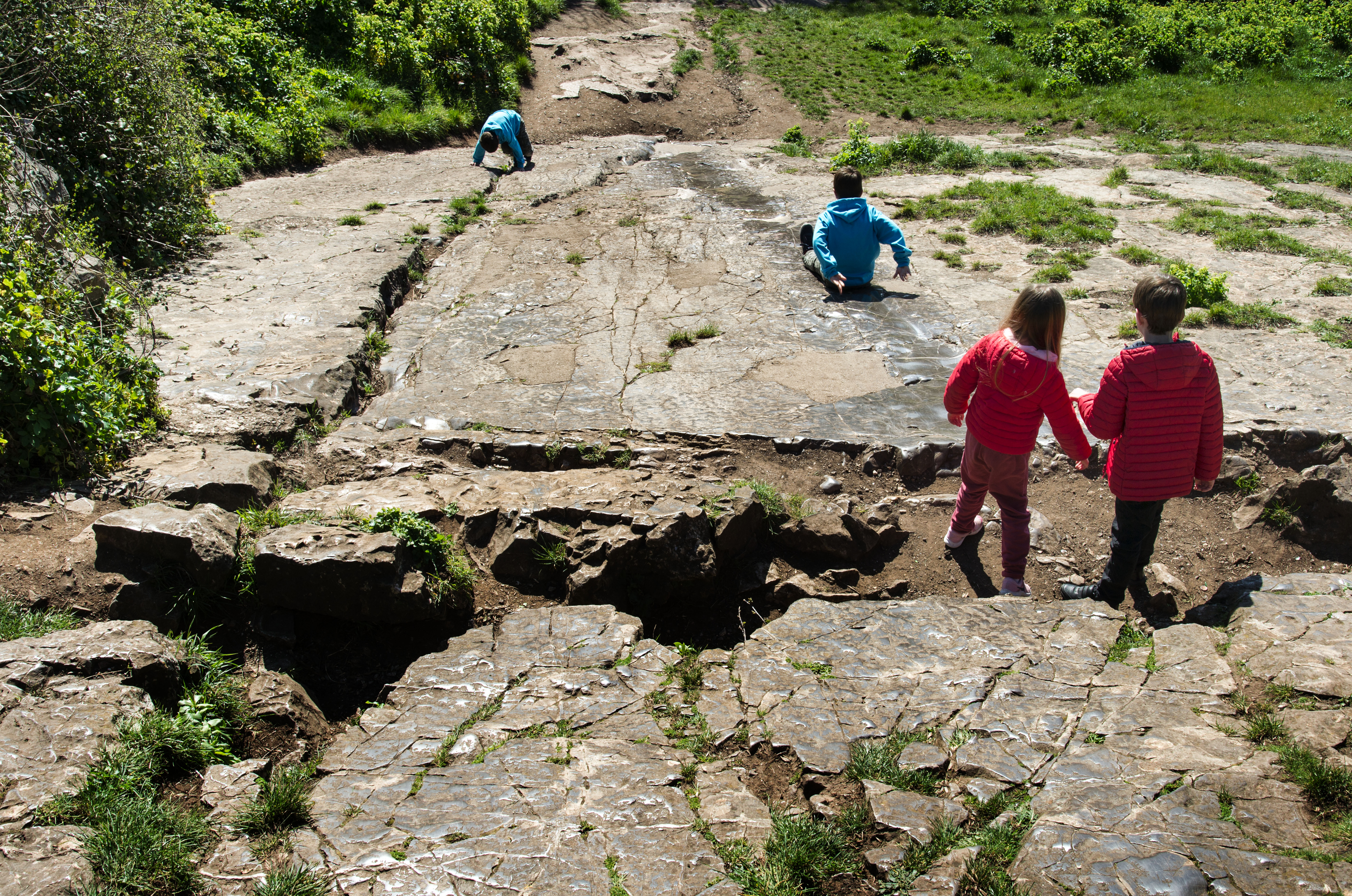
Clifton Rock Slide on the Slidey Rock by the Clifton Suspension Bridge in Bristol.

A wavy playground slide in use in Japan

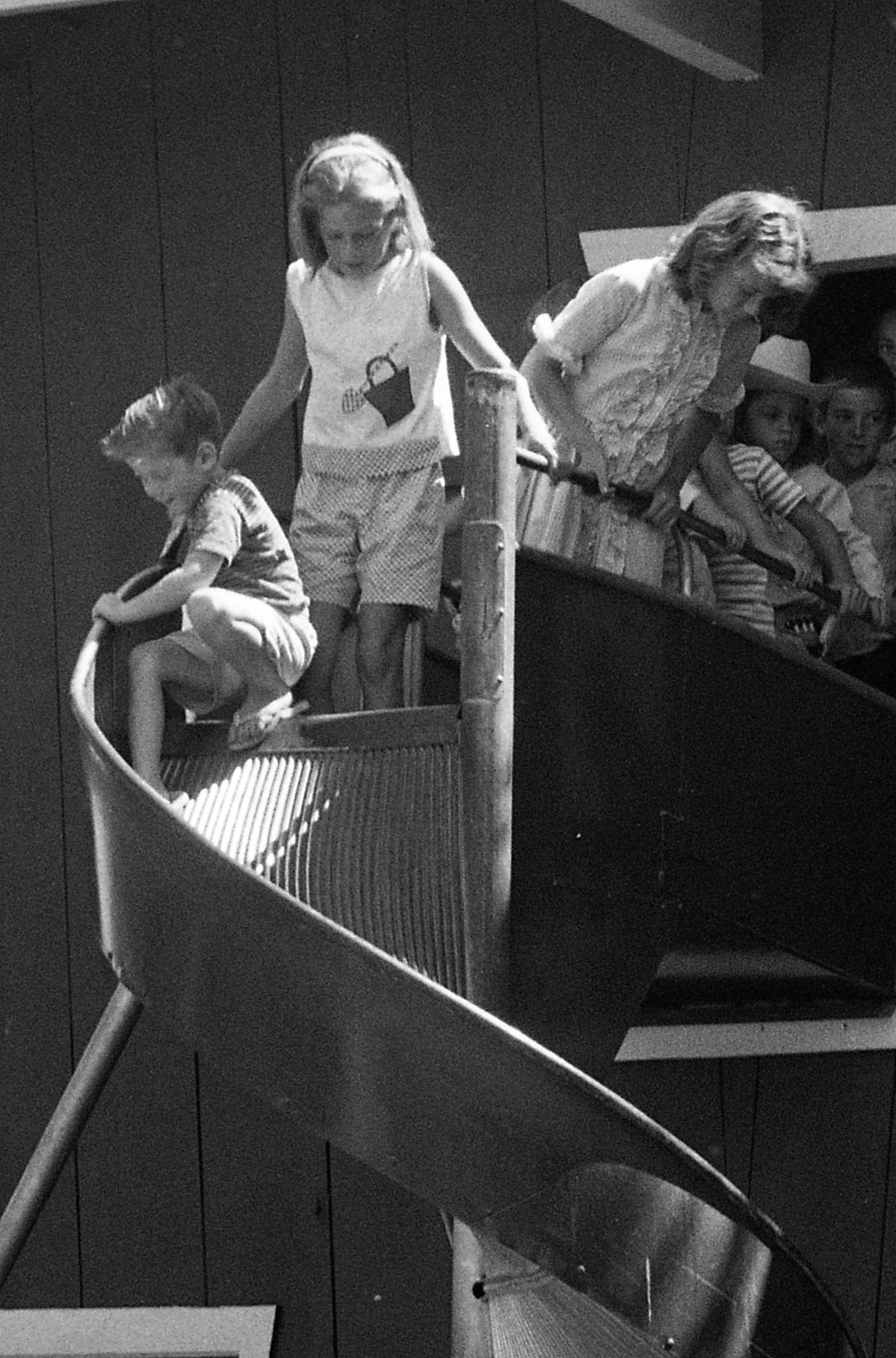
Children preparing to use a curving slide in Sacramento, California, 1963

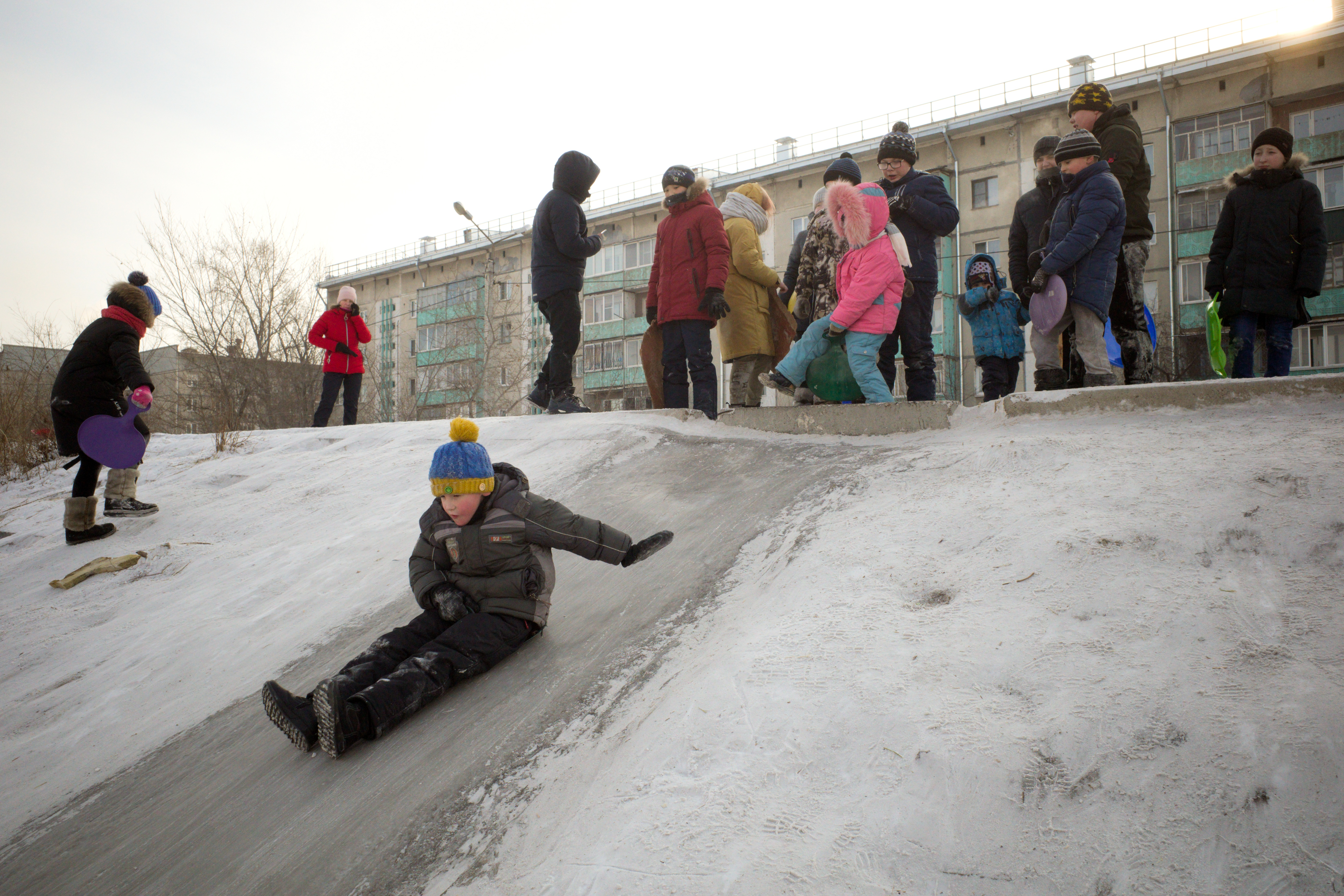
Ice slide in Russia

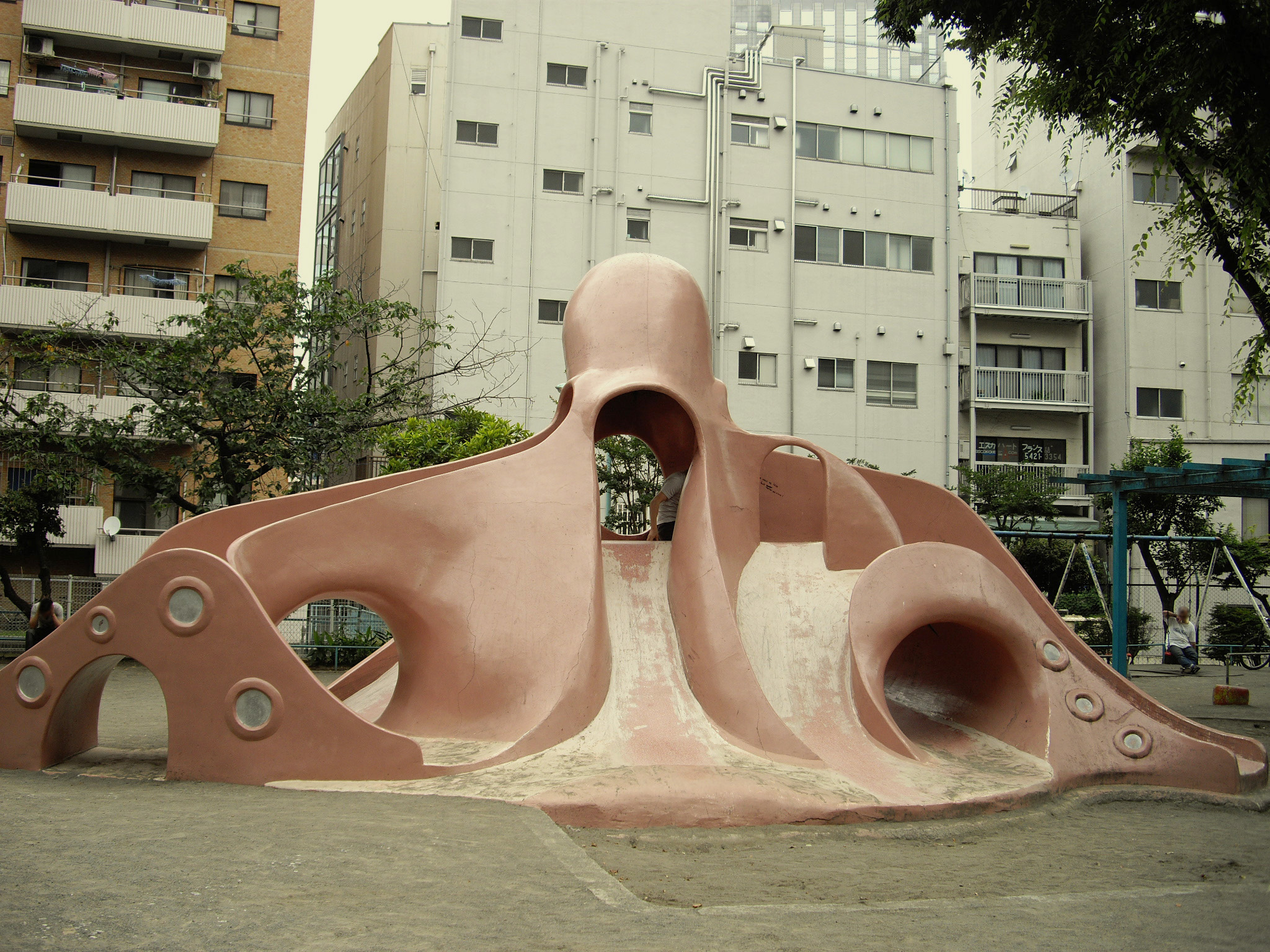
Octopus slide in Japan

== Safety ==
Playground slides are associated with several types of injury. The most obvious is that when a slide is not enclosed and is elevated above the playground surface, then users may fall off and incur bumps, bruises, sprains, broken bones, or traumatic head injuries. Some materials, such as metal, may become very hot during warm, sunny weather. Plastic slides can also be vulnerable to melting by arson.

Some efforts to keep children safe on slides may do more harm than good. Rather than letting young children play on slides by themselves, some parents seat the children on the adult's lap and go down the slide together. If the child's shoe catches on the edge of the slide, however, this arrangement frequently results in the child's leg being broken. If the child had been permitted to use the slide independently, then this injury would not happen, because when the shoe caught, the child would have stopped sliding rather than being propelled down the slide by the adult's weight. Well designed slides should have 'ability filters' to reduce the likelihood of small children using a slide that is designed for older children (such as a very long slide). Signs warning of the dangers of long slides can also assist in reducing injuries on large slides.

== See also ==
- Jungle gym (monkey bars)
- Outdoor playset
- Swing (seat)
- Slide (disambiguation)

== Sources ==
- Gold, David L. (1 January 1981). "Three New-York-Cityisms: Sliding Pond, Potsy, and Akey". American Speech. 56 (1): 17–32. doi:10.2307/454476. JSTOR 454476.
