= Warning Signs (James Marriott album) =

Upcoming third studio album by James Marriott

Studio album by James Marriott
- Released: 15 January 2027
- Label: AWAL
- Producers: Aleksi Kiiskinen; James Marriott; Eeli Savolainen; Jono Suter

James Marriott chronology
Don't Tell the Dog (2025)	Warning Signs (2027)

Singles from Warning Signs
- 1. "Burn Down the Disco" Released: 4 September 2026; 2. "Lovestruck" Released: 16 October 2026; 3. "Kiss" Released: 27 November 2026

Warning Signs is the upcoming third studio album by English indie rock musician James Marriott. The album is centered around uncertainty, relationships, and what the future looks like. It will feature the singles "Burn Down the Disco", "Lovestruck" and “Kiss”.

== Themes ==
While Marriott's previous album, Don't Tell the Dog, centered around reconciling with childhood loss and grief, Marriott’s third album is focused on effect a musician's life has on his personal life. He recorded most of the songs during a break he took to Finland with his band in February 2026. On a guest episode of the Bach and Arthur Podcast, Marriott stated that the album is “about what does planning for the future mean when every year it seems like my life takes a very different direction.”

== Release and reception ==
=== Commercial performance ===
The album's lead single, "Burn Down the Disco", was released on 4 September 2026. The song peaked at No. 10 on the UK singles chart.

On 17 September 2026, at his show in Brixton Academy O2, Marriott announced that his third album, Warning Signs, will be released on 15 January 2027.

=== Critical response ===
Jack Rogers from Rock Sound praised "Burn Down the Disco", writing that the song "may imply that [Marriott] wants to step away from the dancefloor, but based on the shimmering grooves and foot-tapping beats of the track, it’s going to be impossible to do that. Pulling on the most racuous elements of mid 00s indie chaos and forcing it through a modern lens, it’s going to be stuck in your head for months to come."

== Track listing ==
All tracks are written by James Marriott and Jono Suter, with additional writers noted.

Warning Signs track listing
No.	Title	Writer(s)	Length
1.	"Sleepwalker"		3:57
2.	"Double Bed"		2:47
3.	"Kiss"		2:55
4.	"Lovestruck"	Sam Horsley; Josh Caplin; Roope Kopperi; Psylla; Eeli Savolainen; Juho Koskivirta	3:12
5.	"Burn Down the Disco"	Psylla; Matt Gavin; Savolainen; Louis Salanson; Koskivirta	3:17
6.	"Déjà Vu"		4:18
7.	"Madeline"		3:01
8.	"Come Back To Me"		3:47
9.	"Lights Out"		3:34
10.	"Hell"		3:16
11.	"Five Year Plan"		3:57
