= Are We There Yet? (James Marriott album) =

Debut studio album by James Marriott

Studio album by James Marriott
- Released: 10 November 2023
- Genre: Indie rock
- Length: 31:46
- Producers: James Marriott; Psylla; Jono Suter

James Marriott chronology
Bitter Tongues (2022)	Are We There Yet? (2023)	Don't Tell the Dog (2025)

Singles from Are We There Yet?
- 1. "So Long" Released: 6 June 2023; 2. "Romanticise This" Released: 27 July 2023; 3. "Don't Blame Me" Released: 19 October 2023

Are We There Yet? is the debut studio album by English indie rock musician James Marriott. Released on 10 November 2023, the album focuses on themes of loss, journeys, and seeking peace. Featuring the singles "So Long", "Romanticise This", and "Don't Blame Me", the album reached No. 17 on the Official Albums Chart and No. 2 on UK Independent Albums Chart.

== Recording and production ==
The album began production in May 2022. The ninth track, "Denial", was in production since February 2022. The album was written by Marriott, in close collaboration with his writing partners Matt Gavin and Jono Suter. Marriott's bassist Samuel Horsley, musicians Psylla and Charlie Sale, drummer Eeli Savolainen, and orchestral arranger Jere Särkkä also were involved in the writing of the album. Marriott has stated that the album was "inspired by playing live".

Marriott played several tracks, including "The Other Side" and "So Long", during his previous tour "The Bitter Tour" before the album's official release in 2023. In an interview with the Official Charts Company, Marriott discussed releasing an album independently three years after his music debut:

"I am very lucky. Everyone always speaks about this idea that you have your whole life to write your debut album, but then only a year to make your second. This was a year's work for me, and I don't plan on stopping. A lot of the music I made as a kid has not made it [this far]. Honestly. because none of it was very good. But now I'm very grateful to be surrounded by some very talented musicians who've helped me craft my sound."

Marriott stated that, "My friend described the album as 10 songs to dye your hair blue to", and that "it's fairly eclectic in its approach to sound. I don't think there's a person that will listen to the album and go, 'there's not a single song here that I can enjoy."

The cover art for the album and all three singles was designed by James Fenner.

== Themes ==
Are We There Yet? describes Marriott's hypothetical leaving of the United Kingdom to return to Spain, and his own desire to know if his personal struggles would follow him to some new place. Sonically, the album drew inspiration from "Mountains" by Biffy Clyro, "Sex" by The 1975, and "Mr. Brightside" by The Killers.

== Release and reception ==
=== Commercial performance ===
"So Long" was released on 9 June 2023 as the album's official lead single. "Romanticise This" was released on 27 July 2023 and served the album's second single. "Don't Blame Me" was released on 19 October 2023 and served the album's third and final single. All three singles received music videos to support their release.

Are We There Yet? was released on 10 November 2023. The album peaked at 2 on the UK Independent Albums chart, as well as 7 on the Scottish Albums chart and 17 on the UK Albums chart. "Don’t Blame Me" debuted on Spotify’s Viral 50 and "White Noise", the eighth track on the album, gained momentum on TikTok.

=== Critical reception ===
Shyla Davidson of Square One Magazine gave the album a positive rating of 4 out of 5 stars, the article reads "With a mix of happy and melancholy tunes, this album leaves listeners feeling refreshed, and somewhat nostalgic. With just the right amount of slow, calming songs and songs that just make listeners want to dance, this album surely has something for listeners of all walks of life."

== Track listing ==
All tracks are written by James Marriott, Psylla and Matthew Gavin unless otherwise stated.

Are We There Yet? track listing
No.	Title	Writer(s)	Producer(s)	Length
1.	"You Are Here"	James Marriott; Psylla; Eeli Savolainen; Matt Gavin; Samuel Horsley	Marriott; Psylla	3:17
2.	"So Long"	Marriott; Psylla; Savolainen; Suter; Gavin; Horsley	Marriott; Psylla	3:19
3.	"Going Postal at the Party"	Marriott; Psylla; Savolainen; Suter; Horsley	Marriott; Psylla; Suter	3:25
4.	"Over My Head"		Marriott; Psylla; Suter	3:23
5.	"Romanticise This"	Gavin; Suter	Marriott; Psylla	2:55
6.	"In Between"		Marriott; Psylla; Suter	2:57
7.	"The Other Side"		Marriott; Psylla; Suter	3:22
8.	"White Noise"	Marriott; Psylla; Roope Kopperi	Marriott; Psylla; Suter	2:33
9.	"Denial"	Gavin	Marriott; Psylla; Suter	3:15
10.	"Don't Blame Me"	Marriott; Psylla; Suter; Gavin; Horsley	Marriott; Psylla	3:16
Total length:				31:46

== Charts ==
Chart performance for Are We There Yet?
Chart (2023–2026)	Peak position
Scottish Albums (Official Charts)	7
UK Albums (Official Charts)	17
UK Independent Albums (Official Charts)	2

== See also ==
- List of UK Album Downloads Chart number ones of the 2020s
