= Bitter Tongues (EP) =

EP by James Marriott
- Released: 24 June 2022
- Genre: Indie rock
- Length: 17:10
- Producers: James Marriott; Psylla; Jono Suter

James Marriott chronology
No Left Brain (2021)	Bitter Tongues (2022)	Are We There Yet? (2023)

Singles from Bitter Tongues
- 1. "Gold" Released: 10 December 2021; 2. "Sleeping On Trains" Released: 14 January 2022

Bitter Tongues is the second EP by English indie rock musician James Marriott. Released on 24 June 2022, the EP focuses on themes of heartbreak, sexuality, love, and his creative persona on social media. Featuring the singles “Gold” and “Sleeping on Trains”, the EP reached No. 4 on the UK Indie Chart and No. 9 on the Scottish Charts.

== Recording and production ==
After releasing his debut EP No Left Brain, Marriott invested nearly everything into the production and development Bitter Tongues. He dipped into his savings in order to make music videos and finish production on the project.

Several of the songs went through extensive rewrites. In an interview with Brig News, Marriott describes the various rewrites that "Grapes", the fifth and final track, went through: “I said the ‘did nobody ever tell you grapes are better in September’ [lyric] to someone, and then I immediately wrote it down, and then I just had that lyric like rolling around in my head for a while."

== Themes ==
Bitter Tongues depicts Marriott’s experiences with heartbreak, sexuality, love, and his creative persona on social media. The various tracks on the EP explore various emotions.

"Grapes" depicts the struggles of maturing into young adulthood, and the struggles that come with that transition. Marriott stated that “‘Grapes’ is the culmination of my want to write about the dichotomy of love and timing. A fragile man and a strong woman are childhood loves, but neither of them have lived their lives and become adults yet.”

== Release and reception ==
=== Release ===
"Gold" was released on 10 December 2021 as the first single from Bitter Tongues. It was followed up by the second single "Sleeping on Trains", released on 14 January 2022. Marriott announced both singles would appear on the then-upcoming EP Bitter Tongues via X on 7 June 2022.

Bitter Tongues was released on 24 June 2022, followed by a vinyl release on 29 November 2024.

=== Commercial reception ===
Bitter Tongues peaked at No. 4 on the UK Indie Chart and No. 9 on the Scottish Charts.

One of the songs, "Grapes", achieved viral popularity a few months after its release and has since experienced a strong resurgence every September.

=== Critical reception ===
In a review of "Grapes", Robin Murray from Clash stated that, "Brighton's own James Marriott is pushing forwards with alacrity, merging the spiky indie of The Strokes, say, with the dynamic, fly-on-wall lyricism of Sam Fender."

Jakk Breedon from music blog A1234 wrote that, "we’ve been able to see [Marriott's] soundscape evolve, going from parodies of latin music about Lele Pons to fully fledged alternative pop tracks featuring hooks so catchy you'd require an excavation crew to remove them from your head.” He continues on to write that “Grapes” is "one half The Wanted's memorable 'Glad You Came' and the other The 1975 during their self-titled album era mixed with The Wombats."

== Track listing ==
All tracks are written by James Marriott, Psylla and Eeli Savolainen and produced by Marriott and Psylla.

Bitter Tongues track listing
No.	Title	Length
1.	"Where Has Everyone Gone?"	3:36
2.	"Gold"	3:34
3.	"Car Lights"	3:10
4.	"Sleeping on Trains"	3:04
5.	"Grapes"	3:45
Total length:		17:10
