= James Marriott =

British musician and YouTuber (born 1997)

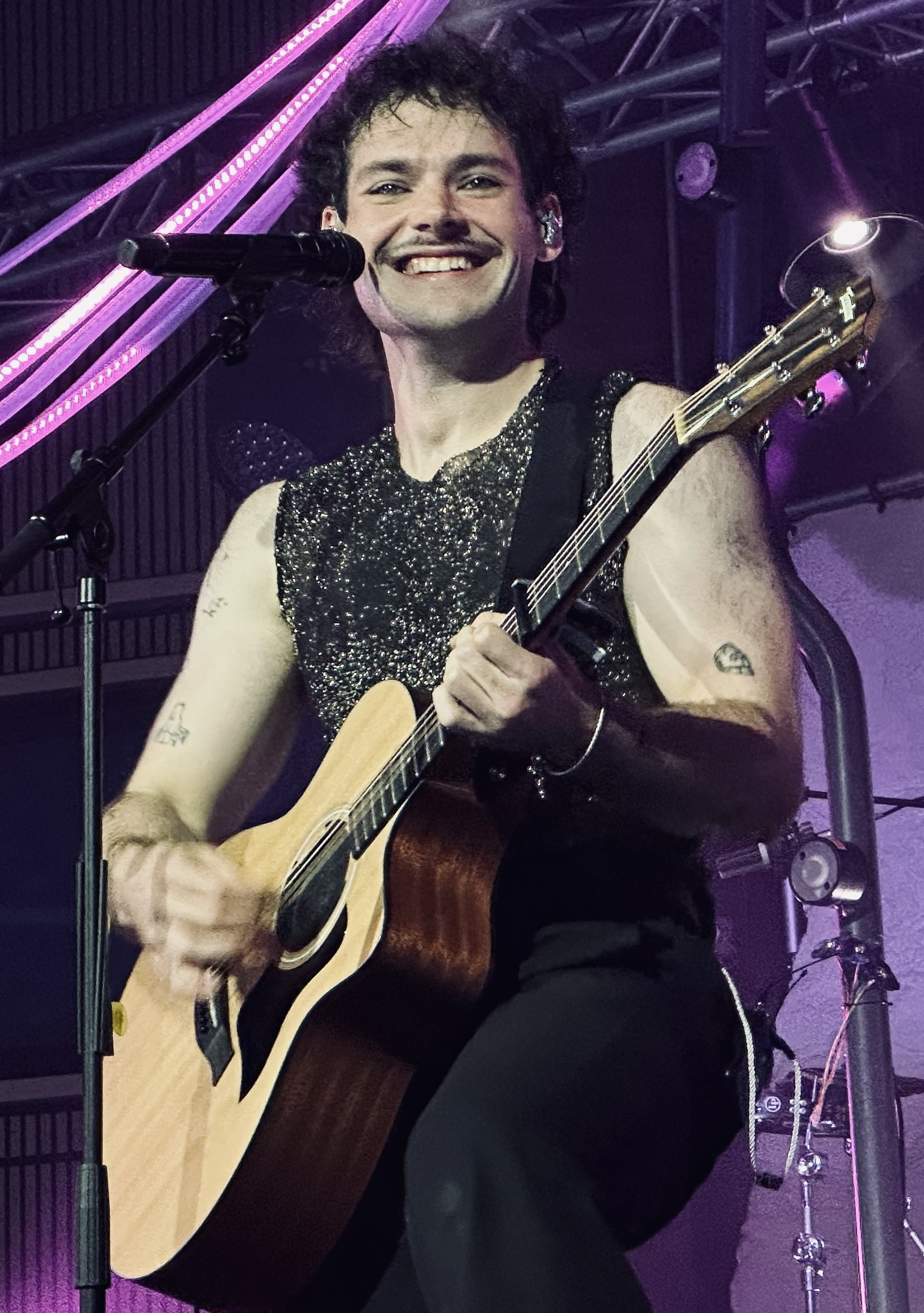
- Marriott performing in Sheffield, 2025

Background information
- Born: James William Marriott; 7 July 1997 (age 29); Kilchberg, Zurich, Switzerland
- Origin: Buckinghamshire, England
- Genre: Indie rock
- Occupations: Musician; singer; songwriter; YouTuber
- Instruments: Vocals; guitar
- Years active: 2012–present
- Label: AWAL
- Website: jamesmarriottmusic.com

Twitch information
- Channel: jamesmarriott
- Years active: 2019–2024
- Followers: 370,000

YouTube information
- Channel: James Marriott
- Subscribers: 2.03 million
- Views: 182.9 million
- Last updated: 2 August 2026

James William Marriott (born 7 July 1997) is a Swiss-born English musician and YouTuber. He is best known for his 2025 No. 1 UK-charting album Don't Tell the Dog and 2026 top-40 single "California Rain". Prior to this, he charted at No. 17 on the UK Albums Chart in 2023 with Are We There Yet? and No. 67 on the UK singles chart with "I Don't Want to Live Like This".

After uploading videos of his instrumental acoustic music, he attracted attention after diversifying into caustic YouTube commentary videos and Twitch livestreams. He stepped back from YouTube to pursue music full-time, releasing his debut single "Slow Down" in May 2020. This was followed by the extended plays No Left Brain and Bitter Tongues. His debut album Are We There Yet? was released in 2023, and his second album, Don't Tell the Dog, was released in 2025. His upcoming third album, Warning Signs, will be released on 15 January 2027.

Marriott cites Foals and the Strokes as major influences, and his music is generally described as indie rock. In 2025, he founded iced coffee company Rodd's alongside close friend and frequent collaborator WillNE.

== Early life ==
James William Marriott was born on 7 July 1997 in Kilchberg, Switzerland, but grew up in Buckinghamshire, England. Marriott was interested in music from a young age and his father was a pianist. In 2008, he began attending Aylesbury Grammar School, and uploading animations online; by 2012, he had diversified into uploading videos of his instrumental acoustic work.

Marriott moved to London in order to study modern languages at University College London. He spent six months of the course in Granada, Spain, to foster proficiency in Spanish and Portuguese.

== Career ==
=== 2016–2020: YouTube ===
In his final year at university, Marriott attracted attention for his YouTube channel as a commentator on popular culture and music, for which he gained more than two million subscribers. In an interview with Dork, he described his content during this period as "taking the piss out of other YouTubers' music". In 2020, Marriott joined the YouTube group Eboys with YouTubers Memeulous, WillNE, and ImAllexx. They hosted a podcast of the same name, and Marriott later gained a following as a live streamer on Twitch.

Later, in an interview with Brig News, Marriott discussed his regrets about his commentary videos and his journey through YouTube. "It's what got me here in the first place, but I was really mean," he stated. "It's a weird thing, because I feel like one of the reasons I'm here is because I had that moment. If I could have found another way to have made it on YouTube, without doing commentary, I would have absolutely taken that route ten times out of ten."

=== 2020–2023: Initial singles and breakthrough ===
Marriott released his first single, the yacht rock-inspired "Slow Down", in May 2020, He then released the single "Him", which appeared on his January 2021 extended play (EP) No Left Brain. In July 2021, Marriott released the single "Wake Up!", which GoldenPlec described as a combination of "angsty alt-rock" and indie rock. Following the release of "Wake Up!", Marriott moved from London to Brighton.

In June 2022, Marriott released his second EP, Bitter Tongues. The EP depicts his experiences with heartbreak, sexuality, love, and his creative persona on social media. One of the songs on the EP, "Grapes", gained viral popularity for a trend done with grapes in September, and has experienced a revival in popularity every September. The song depicts maturing into young adulthood, and the struggles that come with that transition. In an interview with Brig News, Marriott describes the various rewrites "Grapes" went through: "I said the 'did nobody ever tell you grapes are better in September' [lyric] to someone, and then I immediately wrote it down, and then I just had that lyric like rolling around in my head for a while."

=== 2023–2025: Are We There Yet? and festival shows ===
In March 2023, Marriott announced his debut album Are We There Yet? after a show at The Leadmill in Sheffield. Marriott joined several artists as supporting acts that year, including Jake Bugg in his Royal Albert Hall performance for the Teenage Cancer Trust, and Lovejoy on tour. That May, he performed at Brighton's annual Great Escape Festival. It was announced that he would support Lewis Capaldi in an acoustic set in June 2023, though Capaldi later cancelled the gig due to poor mental health. Marriott then released the singles "So Long" and "Romanticise This", the latter a deeply personal track about suicidal ideation. At the Reading and Leeds Festivals in August, Marriott debuted "Don't Blame Me", which was released as an official single in October 2023.

In early November, Marriott released Are We There Yet?, an album that describes Marriott's hypothetical leaving of the United Kingdom to return to Spain, and his own desire to know if his personal struggles would follow him to some new place. The album was produced and written in close collaboration with Marriott's guitarist and keyboardist Jono "Scooter" Suter, as well as Aleksi Kiiskinen. Are We There Yet? charted at number 17 on the UK Albums Chart and number 2 on the UK Independent Albums Chart. That year, Marriott performed his first Australian shows in Sydney and Melbourne and announced dates for a UK and European tour.

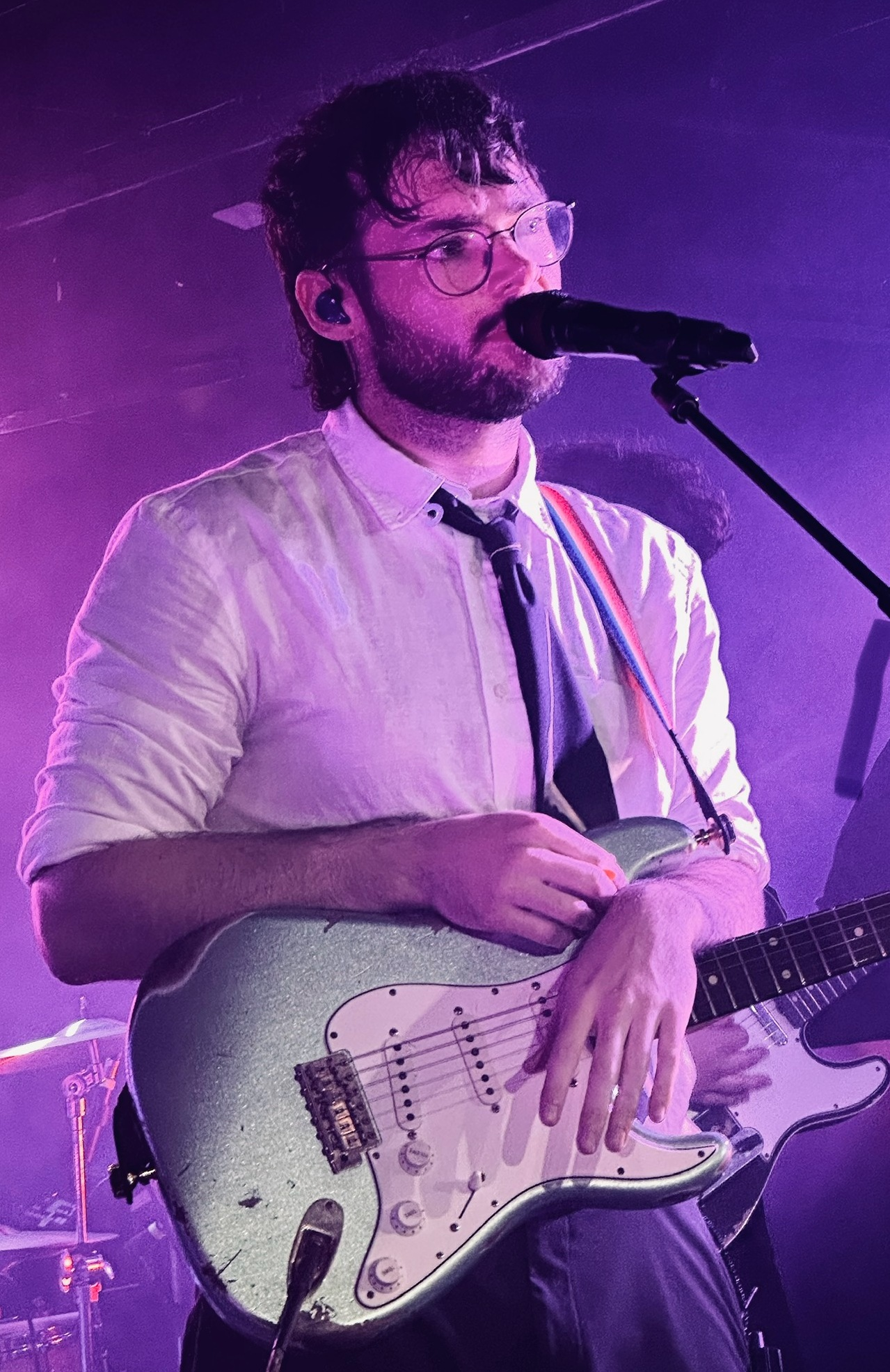
Marriott performing in Leeds in 2024

In February 2024, Marriott was announced to be playing at the annual Reading and Leeds Festivals on the BBC Radio 1 stage, as well as performing on the Big Top stage at the Isle of Wight Festival later in June 2024. A concert at Leeds Festival in August 2024 had to be cancelled on safety grounds due to Storm Lilian, following which Marriott was criticised for charging fans for a replacement gig at The Wardrobe in Leeds city centre.

=== 2025–2026: Don't Tell the Dog and chart success ===
In February 2025, Marriott released the indie pop single "I Don't Want to Live Like This". The song charted at number 67 on the UK singles chart, and in March 2025, Marriott stated that the song was the lead single from his second album Don't Tell the Dog. The album took its name from a childhood incident in which the family moved and left their dog behind. The album was Marriott's second recorded at Big Jelly Studios in Ramsgate, after Are We There Yet?. That month, he released the album's second and third singles, "Toothache" and "It's Only Love". The latter was indie folk track accompanied by a folk horror-inspired music video. The fourth and final single, "Something's Wrong", was released later that year, accompanied by a music video that featured Marriott's friend and collaborator WillNE. The song entered the UK Singles Chart at number 97.

Don't Tell the Dog was released in June 2025, and the album peaked at number 1 on the UK Official Albums Chart. In an interview with Billboard, Marriott stated, "Thank you so, so much for my first-ever official No. 1 album. It’s been such an amazing week traveling up and down the country, doing a little show. I’m just mind blown! Thank you so much for supporting me over the last week, and the last few years."

Marriott began playing the then-unreleased song "California Rain" live in concerts in late 2025. In January 2026, he released the song as a single. It peaked at number 22 in the UK Singles Chart, becoming his first top 40 single. Later, Marriott stated that the song would not be included on his upcoming third studio album.

=== 2026–present: Warning Signs ===
In August 2026, Marriott performed on the main stage at the Reading and Leeds Festivals. In September, he released "Burn Down the Disco" and announced a show at O2 Academy Brixton for 17 September 2026, with Chloe Slater and Hannah Grae as supporting acts. At the show, he announced his third studio album, Warning Signs, for release on 15 January 2027. In October, Marriott released the single "Lovestruck", as the third single.

== Artistic influences ==
Marriott initially "fell head over heels in love with music" after attending an ABBA tribute concert with family as a child. His early guitar work was inspired by Rodrigo y Gabriela, a flamenco and metal music duo. Marriott later deemed the guitar in his music as a "priority", and said he often sits down with an Epiphone Casino whenever emotions hit. In an August 2023 interview with Dork, Marriott cited the Strokes, Bloc Party, Foals, and Kelly Clarkson as influences, the latter for her "in your fucking face" vocal production, and stated that many of his inspirations came from video games he played, describing his music as "somewhere between Guitar Hero 3: Legends of Rock and any FIFA soundtrack between '06 and '13". He also stated that he likes "having choruses that feel Sam Fender-y", a name that Clash's Robin Murray used to describe his lyricism.

Marriott also cites Jacob Collier as having "an interesting way of writing melodies", and wants crowds at his shows to feel like how he did when seeing Delta Sleep perform "The Detail". Marriott also noted that a Dodie concert he attended "made [him] fall in love with having a string quartet over indie music". Speaking to the Official Charts Company, Marriott compared his song "Denial" to Biffy Clyro's "Mountains" and The 1975's "Sex". For Don't Tell the Dog, Marriott was inspired by the laissez-faire production style of Fizz's The Secret to Life. James Wilkinson of AllMusic wrote that Marriott produced "Foals- and Strokes-inspired indie rock".

== Other ventures ==
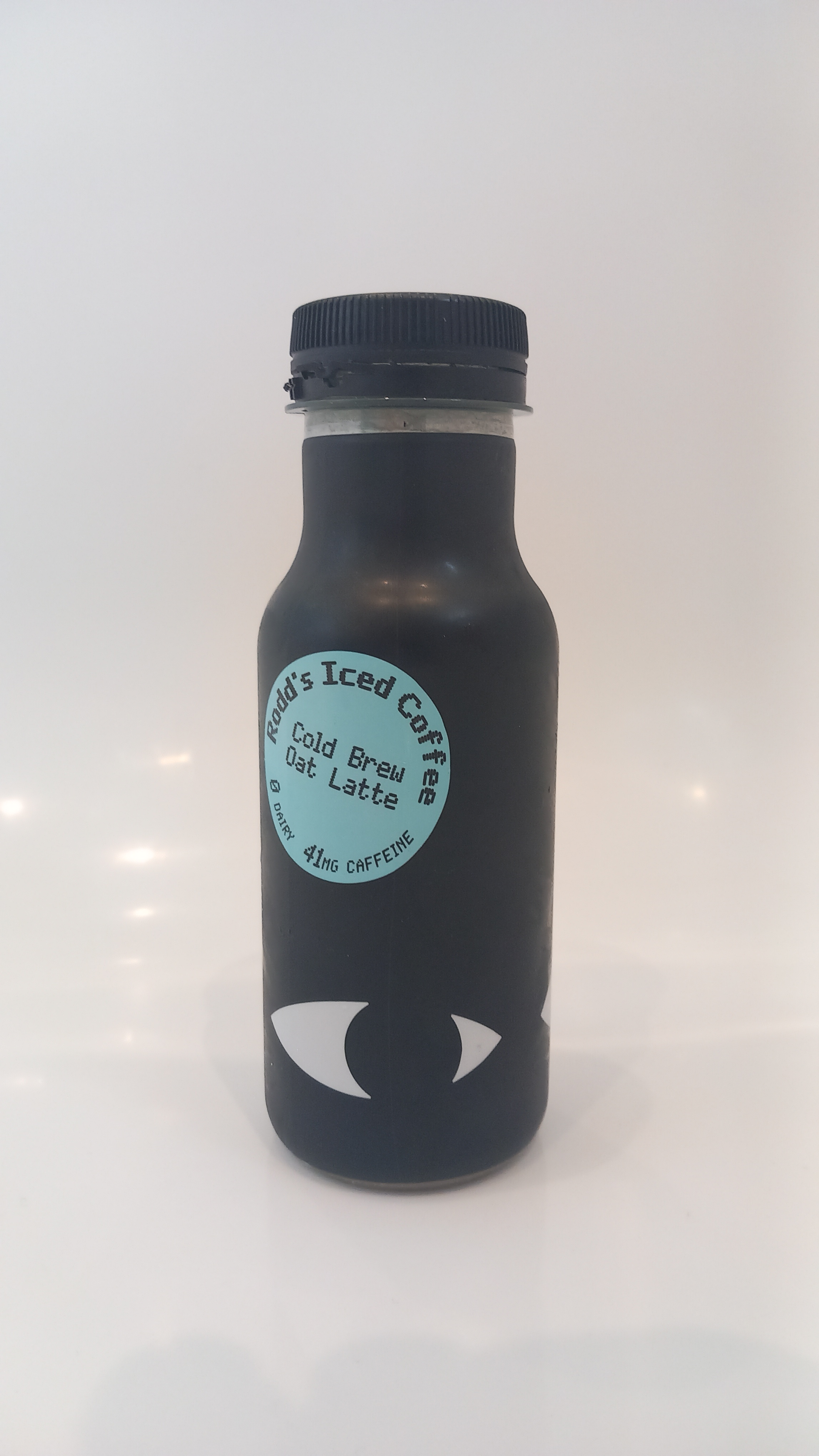
A Cold Brew Oat Latte bottle of Rodd's

In May 2025, Marriott co-founded iced coffee company Rodd's with close friend and frequent collaborator Will Lenney. Advertised as "iced coffee in a bottle that tastes like iced coffee not in a bottle", the brand debuted exclusively in the United Kingdom at 300 Sainsbury's stores. In its first year, the brand surpassed £3 million in retail sales and launched six SKUs. Rodd’s rapidly expanded from the 300 original Sainsbury's stores to nationwide Sainsbury's supermarket distribution within six months, while also launching in Sainsbury's Meal Deals, convenience, and forecourts. Distribution expanded again to include WHSmith, Ocado and food-to-go operator Sandwich Sandwich.

== Band members ==
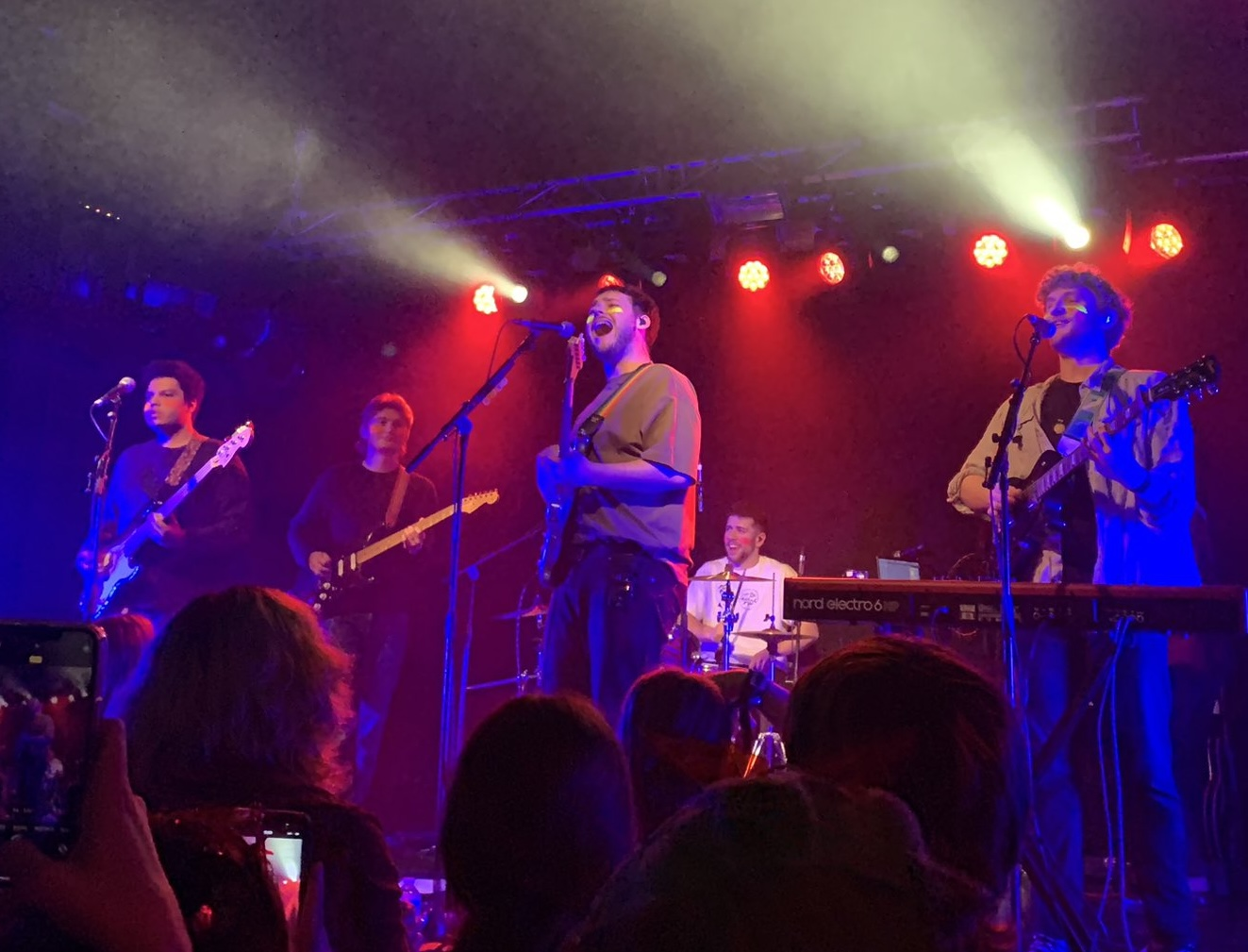
James Marriott (centre), performing at The Garage, 2023, with band members (L–R) Horsley, Gavin, Shakoori and Suter

=== Live members ===
- Matt Gavin – lead guitar (2021–present)
- Jono Scooter – guitar, keyboard (2021–present)
- Samuel Horsley – bass guitar (2021–present)
- Louis Salanson – guitar, percussion, tracks (2023–present)
- Josh Caplin – drums (2024–present)
- Jago Shakoori – drums (2021–2024)

=== Recording personnel ===
- Matt Gavin – lead guitar
- Jono Suter – guitar, keyboard, production
- Samuel Horsley – bass guitar
- Louis Salanson – guitar, percussion

== Discography ==
Studio albums

- Are We There Yet? (2023)
- Don't Tell The Dog (2025)
- Warning Signs (2027)

== Tours ==
=== Headlining ===
- Bitter/UK Tour (2023)
- Australia Tour (2023 + 2024)
- Are We There Yet? Tour (2024)
- Summer '24 Tour (2024)
- US + Canada Tour #1 (2025)
- North America: A James Marriott Tour (2025)
- UK & EU Tour (2025)
- Australia: A James Marriott Tour (2026)
- James Marriott World Tour (2027)

== See also ==
- List of YouTubers
- List of UK Album Downloads Chart number ones of the 2020s
