= The Great Kiwi Bake Off Celebrity Special =

New Zealand television programme

- Starring: Hayley Sproull; Madeleine Sami; Dean Brettschneider; Sue Fleischl; Peter Gordon; Jordan Rondel; Pax Assadi
- No. of episodes: 5

Release
- Original network: TVNZ 2
- Original release: 23 December 2019 - 16 December 2021

Season chronology
- ← Previous; Season 2

The Great Kiwi Bake Off Celebrity Special is a series of special Christmas-themed episodes of The Great Kiwi Bake Off that aired between 23 December 2019 and 22 December 2022. Each episode features six celebrities competing in two Bake Off challenges. For the 2019 edition, the winner won NZ$30,000 for the charity of their choice.

The 2019 edition was won by Jackie van Beek. The 2021 edition was won by Josh Thomson.

The 2022 edition was won by Bree Tomasel.

The 2022 Christmas Special screened on TVNZ 1, on Tuesday, 20 December 2022, and was won by Siouxie Wiles.

== The Great Kiwi Bake Off Celebrity Special 2019 ==
=== Bakers ===
Celebrity Baker	Charity	Amount Won
Art Green	SPCA	NZ$3,500
Bree Tomasel	Lifeline	NZ$3,500
David Fane	Stroke Foundation	NZ$2,000
Jackie van Beek	Women's Refuge	NZ$35,000
Paula Bennett	Dress For Success	NZ$3,500
Toni Street	Catwalk Trust	NZ$13,500

=== Bakes ===
In this Celebrity edition, the prize money totalled NZ$61,000. The celebrity bakers competed in honour of their chosen charity. At the start of the competition, each baker received NZ$2,000 for their charity.

For the technical challenge set by Sue, the celebrity bakers had one hour and forty-five minutes to bake 12 sweet ginger kisses. The winner of the technical would receive NZ$10,000.

For the showstopper challenge, the celebrity bakers had to bake a 3-D biscuit scene based on a Christmas memory in three hours. While no prize was directly awarded for the showstopper challenge, the celebrity bakers could also win spot prizes for creativity and other novelty awards.

- Art won NZ$1,500 for "Most Surprising Combination of Biscuit & Liquid."
- Paula won NZ$1,500 for "Best Death by Biscuit."
- Jackie won NZ$1,500 for "Spinning the Longest Yarn."
- Bree won NZ$750 for "Best Gingerbreast Woman" and NZ$750 for "Best New Zealand-Based Australian Celebrity Baker in the Celebrity Bake Off."
- David won NZ$750 for the "Sound Design Award" and NZ$750 for the "Most Mysterious Use of a Mysterious Bag", which he gave to Jackie & Women's Refuge.
- Toni won NZ$1,500 for "Best Lighting Design."

Jackie won the overall competition and won NZ$30,000.

Baker	Technical (12 Sweet Ginger Kisses)	Signature (3-D Biscuit Scene)
Art	2nd	Lakeside Biscuiting
Bree	5th	Howzat Christmas
David	6th	The Last Umu in Ponsonby
Jackie	3rd	Camping in Arthur's Pass
Paula	4th	The Morning After Christmas
Toni	1st	Christmas Tree Tower

== The Great Kiwi Bake Off Celebrity Special 2021 ==
=== Bakers ===
Celebrity Baker	Charity	Amount Won
Rebekah Randell	StarJam	NZ$12,500
Josh Thomson	Variety	NZ$23,500
Laura Daniel	Shine	NZ$3,500
Justine Smith	LPNZ (Little People of New Zealand)	NZ$3,500
Simon Bridges	Dress For Success (Bay of Plenty)	NZ$3,500
Francis Tipene	I Am Hope	NZ$3,500

=== Bakes ===
In the 2021 Celebrity Special, the prize money totalled NZ$50,000. At the start of the competition, each celebrity baker received NZ$1,000 for their charity.

For the technical challenge set by Sue, the celebrity bakers had one and a half hours to bake 12 festive cupcake snow people. The winner of the technical would receive NZ$10,000.

For the showstopper challenge, the celebrity bakers had to bake a Christmas-themed selfie cake in three hours. The winner of the showstopper would receive NZ$20,000. While no prize was directly awarded for the showstopper challenge, the celebrity bakers could also win spot prizes for creativity and other novelty awards.

- Francis won NZ$1,000 for complimenting the co-hosts' dress sense and NZ$1,500 for calling his wife for assistance.
- Josh won NZ$1,000 for the most fun cupcakes and NZ$1,500 for sharing a personal reflection.
- Justine won NZ$1,000 for the worst cupcakes and NZ$1,500 for dropping a cake onto the floor.
- Laura won NZ$1,000 for her sculpting skills and NZ$1,500 for the best selfie redemption.
- Rebekah won NZ$1,500 for her acting as an "amateur baker."
- Simon won NZ$1,000 for putting on a Green Party sweater and NZ$1,500 for the amount of his lollies the co-hosts had consumed.

Rebekah Randell won the technical challenge, and won a total of NZ$12,500 for her charity.

Josh Thomson was awarded star baker, and won a total of NZ$23,500 for his charity.

Baker	Technical (12 festive snow people)	Signature (Christmas-themed selfie cake)
Francis	4th	Classic Christmas Cake
Josh	3rd	Christmas Dinner Surprise
Justine	6th	Berry Christmouse
Laurie	2nd	Lifelike Lolly Cake
Rebekah	1st	Sugar Claus Cake
Simon	5th	Summer Santa Selfie

== The Great Kiwi Bake Off Celebrity Special 2022 ==
=== Bakers ===
Celebrity Baker	Charity	Amount Won
Bree Tomasel	Endometriosis New Zealand	NZ$8,000
Candy Lane	Endometriosis New Zealand	NZ$2,000
Cassie Roma	Make-A-Wish New Zealand	NZ$2,000
Courtenay Louise	Voices of Hope	NZ$9,000
Lana Searle	Pillars — Ka Pou Whakahou	NZ$2,000
Matt Chisholm	Rural Support Trust	NZ$2,000

=== Bakes ===
For the 2022 Celebrity Special, the prize money totalled NZ$25,000. At the start of the competition, each celebrity baker received NZ$1,000 for their charity.

For the technical challenge set by Jordan, the celebrity bakers had one and a half hours to bake Prosecco & Pear Cake. The winner of the technical challenge would receive NZ$7,000.

For the showstopper challenge, the celebrity bakers had to bake a three-dimension Celebrity Treasure Island moment biscuit in three hours. The winner of the showstopper would receive NZ$12,000.

Courtenay Louise won the technical challenge and won a total of NZ$8,000 for her charity.

Bree Tomasel was awarded star baker and won a total of NZ$13,000 for her charity. She later donated NZ$1,000 to other 5 celebrities from her winning.

Baker	Technical (Prosecco & Pear Cake)	Signature (3-D TV Biscuit Scene)
Bree	3rd	Treasured Sausage Rolls
Candy	2nd	Altercation Cookie
Cassie	5th	Cookie Cargo
Courtenay	1st	Cookie Island
Lana	4th	Treasure Island's Pizza-Gate
Matt	6th	Towering House of Cards

== The Great Kiwi Bake Off Celebrity Christmas Special 2022 ==
This programme screened on Tuesday, 20 December 2022. The prize money totalled NZ$25,000. At the start of the competition, each celebrity baker received NZ$1,000 for their charity.

For the technical challenge set by Peter, the celebrity bakers had one and a half hours to bake Christmas muffins, made according to his recipe. The winner of the technical challenge would receive NZ$7,000.

For the showstopper challenge, the celebrity bakers had to bake a Christmas scene, with at least 50% of it containing meringue, in three hours. The winner of the showstopper would receive NZ$12,000.

David Correos won the technical challenge and won a total of NZ$8,000 for his charity.

Siouxsie Wiles was awarded star baker and won a total of NZ$13,000 for her charity.

=== Bakers ===
Celebrity Baker	Charity	Amount Won
David Correos	Autism NZ	NZ$8,000
Edna Swart	Stroke Foundation NZ	NZ$1,000
JJ Fong	The Fred Hollows Foundation	NZ$1,000
Matt Gibb	StarJam	NZ$1,000
Siouxsie Wiles	OutLine	NZ$13,000
Suzy Cato	SPCA	NZ$1,000

=== Bakes ===
Baker	Technical (Christmas Muffins)	Signature (Meringue Christmas Scene)
David	1st	Pessimist Christmas
Edna	2nd	Christmas Tree
JJ	6th	Snowy Tiger Christmas
Matt	5th	Pōhutukawa Wow'er
Siouxsie	4th	Christmas Gift
Suzy	3rd	Christmas Morning
