= The Great Kiwi Bake Off season 3 =

The Great Kiwi Bake Off
- Season 3
- Starring: Hayley Sproull; Madeleine Sami; Dean Brettschneider; Sue Fleischl
- No. of episodes: 9

Release
- Original network: TVNZ 1
- Original release: 14 October – 9 December 2021

Season chronology
- ← Previous; Season 2 Next → Season 4

After a COVID-19 pandemic enforced break in 2020, the third season of The Great Kiwi Bake Off was filmed in 2021 at Parihoa Farm in Muriwai instead of the usual location, South Auckland's Puketutu Island Estate. This season premiered on 14 October 2021 on TVNZ 1 with Sproull, Sami, Brettschneider and Fleischl returning in their respective roles.

Mental Health Doctor, Alby Hailes, won the third season with Courtnay Fafeita and Jasmin Hohaia finishing as runner-ups.

== Bakers ==
Ages, names, and hometowns stated are at time of filming.

Bakers of The Great Kiwi Bake Off Season 3
Baker	Age	Occupation	Hometown	Outcome
Alby Hailes	26	Mental Health Doctor	Whangārei	Winner
Courtnay Fafeita	27	Wedding and Event Planner	Masterton	Runners-Up
Jasmin Hohaia	35	Beauty Retail Worker	Auckland	Runners-Up
Tom Anderson	38	Carpenter	Auckland	4th Place
Wendy Banks	43	Transportation Engineer	Queenstown	5th Place
Pera Bella Tipene	53	Counsellor	Tauranga	6th Place
Christina Fehlmann	30	Research Associate	Hamilton	7th Place (Note: Christina withdrew herself from the competition after her visit to the A&E)
Gabriel Weibl	43	Student Teacher	Timaru	8th Place
Teniqua Jones	29	Stay-at-home Mother	Hamilton	9th Place
Hamish Russell	32	Marketing Manager	Auckland	10th Place

== Bakers progress ==
Elimination chart
Baker	1	2	3	4	5	6	7	8	9
Alby	HIGH	SB	SAFE	SAFE	HIGH	LOW	HIGH	HIGH	WINNER
Courtnay	SB	HIGH	HIGH	SAFE	HIGH	LOW	LOW	SB	Runner-up
Jasmin	SAFE	HIGH	SAFE	HIGH	LOW	SB	SAFE	SAFE	Runner-up
Tom	SAFE	LOW	HIGH	SB	SB	HIGH	SB	OUT	
Wendy	HIGH	SAFE	SB	LOW	LOW	LOW	OUT		
Pera	LOW	SAFE	SAFE	LOW	OUT				
Christina	SAFE	SAFE	LOW	WDR					
Gabriel	LOW	LOW	OUT						
Teniqua	SAFE	OUT							
Hamish	OUT								

Colour key:

Baker got through to the next round.
Baker was eliminated
Baker withdrew from the competition
Baker was one of the judges' least favourite bakers that week, but was not eliminated.
Baker was one of the judges' favourite bakers that week.
Baker was Star Baker of the week
Baker was the series runner-up.
Baker was the series winner.

== Episodes ==
Baker eliminated/withdrew
Star Baker
Winner

=== Episode 1: Cake ===
For the signature challenge, the bakers had to bake a vertical cake in two hours. For the technical challenge set by Sue, the bakers had two hours to bake a vegan apple cake. For the showstopper challenge, the bakers had to bake a "super size me cake", a large version of something of significance to the bakers, in four hours.

Baker	Signature (Vertical Cake)	Technical (Vegan Apple Cake)	Showstopper ("Super Size Me Cake")
Alby	Saffron & Orange Blossom Cake	5th	Tennis Ball Cake
Christina	Tangy Raspberry & Lemonade Cake	10th	Naughty But Nice Poo Emoji Cake
Courtnay	Mocha & Marshmallow Cake	3rd	Oki Soosh Cake
Gabriel	Doge's Palace with Spicy Pears Cake	9th	Bow Tie Cake
Hamish	'A Little Bit Corny' Cake	6th	Paint Brush Cake
Jasmin	Tropical Heaven Cake	2nd	Flower Pot Teddy Bear Cake
Pera	Lime, Pink Ginger & Pistachio Cake	8th	Pōtae Cake (Hat Cake)
Teniqua	Strawberry & Cream Cake	4th	White Chocolate Raspberry Rose Cake
Tom	Sunday Roast Cake	7th	Tool Time Tape Measure Cake
Wendy	Chocolate & Green Tea Roll	1st	Kiwi with Pandan Cake

=== Episode 2: Biscuit ===
For the signature challenge, the bakers had to bake twelve melting moments in ninety minutes. For the technical challenge set by Sue, the bakers had two hours to bake chocolate marshmallow teacakes. For the showstopper challenge, the bakers had to bake a biscuit chandelier in three-and-a-half hours.

Baker	Signature (Melting Moments)	Technical (Chocolate Marshmallow Teacakes)	Showstopper (Biscuit Chandelier)
Alby	Matcha Melting Moments	5th	Shore to Sea Chandelier
Christina	Tiramisu in a Bite Melting Moments	6th	Spooktacular Spicy Chandelier
Courtnay	Pink Marble Melting Moments	1st	Shortbread Sakura in Spring Chandelier
Gabriel	Polar Bear Paws Melting Moments	8th	Christmas Bears & Lights Chandelier
Jasmin	High Tea Melting Moments	7th	Family Tree Chandelier
Pera	Kawakawa Melting Moments	2nd	Hīnaki Chandelier
Teniqua	Purple Passionfruit Melting Moments	3rd	Pink Diamond Chandelier
Tom	Classic Melting Moments	9th	Family Christmas Chandelier
Wendy	Fruit & Nut Melting Moments	4th	Floral Chandelier

=== Episode 3: Aotearoa ===
For the signature challenge, the bakers had to bake sixteen chocolate brownies in ninety minutes. For the technical challenge set by Dean, the bakers had two hours to bake Kawakawa pockets with Horopito relish. For the showstopper challenge, the bakers had to bake a cake made to resemble a New Zealand landmark in four-and-a-half hours.

Baker	Signature (Kiwi Chocolate Brownies)	Technical (Kawakawa Pockets & Horopito Relish)	Showstopper (Aotearoa Landmark Cake)
Alby	Kawakawa & Mānuka Honey Blondie	2nd	Pink & White Terraces
Christina	Buttered Jam Toast Blondie	5th	Lands of the flowing Waikato River
Courtnay	Peanut Brownie Brownie	8th	Ice Cream at Castlepoint
Gabriel	Avocado and Beetroot Brownie	6th	Punakaiki Zserbó Pancake Rocks
Jasmin	Kiwi Louise Cake Brownie	4th	Cathedral Cove
Pera	Chocolate Peanut with Kūmarahou Brownie	3rd	Putauaki
Tom	Roasted Hazelnut & Beetroot Honey Brownie	7th	Tokangawhā / Split Apple Rock
Wendy	Flat White & Hokey Pokey Brownie	1st	The Remarkables & Lake Wakatipu

=== Episode 4: Savoury ===
For the signature challenge, the bakers had to bake eight savoury doughnuts in two-and-a-half hours. For the technical challenge set by Dean, the bakers had two-and-a-half hours to bake eight pretzels. For the showstopper challenge, the bakers had to bake a decorated focaccia in four hours.

Baker	Signature (Doughnuts)	Technical (Pretzels)	Showstopper (Focaccia)
Alby	Beetroot Borani Doughnuts	5th	Haumoana Caddy Shack Focaccia
Christina	Butternut Squash & Ricotta Doughnuts	3rd	Did not compete (Medical Emergency)
Courtnay	Brekky Nuts	7th	Knead A Tropical Holiday Focaccia
Jasmin	Mum's Cheese Ball Doughnuts	2nd	Hubby's Hometown Focaccia
Pera	Taniwha Doughnuts	6th	Kawakawa Focaccia
Tom	Savoury Crab Filled Doughnuts	1st	Africa Safari Focaccia
Wendy	Pork & Prawn Doughnuts	4th	Sunset Fiji Focaccia

=== Episode 5: Fresh ===
For the signature challenge, the bakers had to bake twelve vegan slices in two-and-a-half hours. For the technical challenge set by Dean, the bakers had two-and-a-half hours to bake a vegetable spiral tart. For the showstopper challenge, the bakers had to bake a fruit pie in three-and-a-half hours.

Baker	Signature (Vegan Slices)	Technical (Vegetable Spiral Tart)	Showstopper (Fruit Pie)
Alby	Tropical Louise Vegan Slice	1st	Taste of Whangārei
Courtnay	Chocolate & Orange Vegan Slice	4th	Tangy Tamarillo Pie
Jasmin	Boozy Cherry Vegan Slice	6th	Family Favourite Apple Pie
Pera	Blueberry & Mint Chocolate Chip Vegan Slice	5th	Kete of Winter Fruits
Tom	Filipino Inspired Vegan Slice	3rd	Daddy's Favourite Cherry & Kirsch Pie
Wendy	Fruits of Asia Vegan Slice	2nd	Bakewell Pie-brid

=== Episode 6: Dairy ===
For the signature challenge, the bakers had to bake twelve choux au craquelins in two hours. For the technical challenge set by Sue, the bakers had two hours to bake a Portuguese milk pudding. For the showstopper challenge, the bakers had to bake a hand-painted two-tier dairy cake in four hours.

Baker	Signature (Choux Au Craquelin)	Technical (Portuguese Milk Pudding)	Showstopper (Dairy Cake)
Alby	Hazelnut Praline Choux Au Craquelin	5th	Graffiti Greyhound Cake
Courtnay	All Sorts of Choux	1st	Placid Peacock Cake
Jasmin	Chocolate Filled Choux	2nd	Girl with a Pearl Earring Cake
Tom	Tea for Two Choux	4th	Birds of New Zealand Cake
Wendy	Boysenberry Ripple Choux	3rd	Scottish Highland Cow Cake

=== Episode 7: Bread ===
For the signature challenge, the bakers had to bake eight vegetarian stuffed flatbreads in ninety minutes. For the technical challenge set by Dean, the bakers had two-and-a-half hours to bake a braided babka. For the showstopper challenge, the bakers had to bake an animal bread sculpture in four-and-a-half hours.

Baker	Signature (Flatbreads)	Technical (Braided Babka)	Showstopper (Animal Bread Sculpture)
Alby	Spiced Chickpea, Leek & Potato Flatbreads	1st	Octopus Bread
Courtnay	Cheesy Potatoey Flatbreads	4th	Piggies
Jasmin	Vegetarian Stuffed Wholemeal Flatbreads	2nd	Boston's Crocodile
Tom	Gözleme Turkish Stuffed Flatbreads	3rd	Pīwakawaka
Wendy	Potato & Spinach Curry Stuffed Flatbreads	5th	Peacock

=== Episode 8: Chocolate (Semi-Final) ===
For the signature, the bakers had to bake twelve chocolate biscuit bars in two-and-a-half hours. For the technical challenge set by Dean, the bakers had one hour to bake chocolate fondant. For the showstopper challenge, the bakers had to bake a multi-tiered chocolate cake in four hours.

Baker	Signature (Chocolate Biscuit Bars)	Technical (Chocolate Fondant)	Showstopper (Multi-tiered Chocolate Cake)
Alby	Pink Ladyfinger Chocolate Bars	1st	Cherry Blossom Cake
Courtnay	24 Carrot Chocolate Bars	2nd	Chocolate Buttermilk Cake
Jasmin	Banoffee Chocolate Bars	3rd	Pear, Ginger & Dark Chocolate Cake
Tom	Millionaire's Shortbread Chocolate Bar	4th	Black Forest Gateau

=== Episode 9: Final ===
For the signature, the bakers had to bake 12 petit fours in two-and-a-half hours. For the technical challenge set by Sue, the bakers had three hours to bake a cassata. For the showstopper challenge, the bakers were given the freedom to bake anything they wanted provided that it was at least 40 centimetres tall and had at least one cake element in five hours.

Baker	Signature (Petit Fours)	Technical (Cassata)	Showstopper (Anything)
Alby	Hazelnut Opera Cake Petit Four	3rd	Match-a Made in Heaven Tower
Courtnay	Glossy Girls Petit Four	2nd	Bang of Berry Pink
Jasmin	Spiced Apple Tarts & Biscuit Petit Four	1st	Bake Off Time Capsule
