= The Great Kiwi Bake Off season 5 =

The Great Kiwi Bake Off
- Season 5
- Presented by: Hayley Sproull; Pax Assadi
- Judges: Peter Gordon; Jordan Rondel; Michael Van de Elzen
- Winner: Anna Wainwright
- Runners-up: Devoney Scarfe; Sally Eagle
- Location: Parihoa Farm, Muriwai, Auckland
- No. of episodes: 8

Release
- Original network: TVNZ 1 TVNZ+
- Original release: 25 January – 14 March 2024

Season chronology
- ← Previous; Season 4

The fifth season of The Great Kiwi Bake Off return to Parihoa Farm in Muriwai, Auckland. This season premiered on Thursday 25 January 2024 at 7.30pm on TVNZ 1 and streams on TVNZ+. As with the previous season, it was hosted by comedians Pax Assadi and Hayley Sproull, with the judges being Peter Gordon, Jordan Rondel, and - for episode 3 - New Zealand TV chef and restaurateur Michael Van de Elzen.

== Bakers ==
Ages, names, and hometowns stated are at time of filming.

Bakers of The Great Kiwi Bake Off Season 5
Baker	Age	Occupation	Hometown	Outcome
Anna Wainwright	28	Teacher	Auckland	Winner
Devoney Scarfe	47	Commercial Artist	Auckland	Runners-up
Sally Eagle	37	Wedding Dress Designer	Lower Hutt	Runners-up
Danielle Windfuhr	39	Executive Assistant	Auckland	4th place
Aidan Woodward	42	Electrician/Registered Nurse	Nelson	5th place
Josephine Tjandra	36	Food Analyst	Palmerston North	6th place
Chantelle Reihana	23	Model/Hospitality	Kaikohe	7th place
Josh Duncan	32	Civil Engineering Project Manager	Nelson	8th place
Lillian Wrigglesworth	56	Homemaker	Amberley	9th place
Paul Dickson	45	Founder of Oke Charity	Auckland	10th place

== Bakers progress ==
Progress of bakers including rank/position in each episode
Baker	Episode							
Baker	1	2	3	4	5	6	7	8
Anna	SAFE	SB	SB	HIGH	LOW	SB	SAFE	WINNER
Devoney	SB	SAFE	SAFE	LOW	SAFE	SAFE	SAFE	Runner-up
Sally	HIGH	SAFE	HIGH	HIGH	SB	SAFE	SB	Runner-up
Danielle	SAFE	SAFE	HIGH	SAFE	SAFE	SAFE	OUT	
Aidan	SAFE	SAFE	LOW	SB	LOW	OUT		
Josephine	SAFE	SAFE	SAFE	SAFE	OUT			
Chantelle	SAFE	SAFE	SAFE	OUT				
Josh	LOW	SAFE	OUT					
Lillian	SAFE	OUT						
Paul	OUT							

Colour key:

Baker got through to the next round.
Baker was eliminated
Baker was one of the judges' least favourite bakers that week, but was not eliminated.
Baker was one of the judges' favourite bakers that week.
Baker was Star Baker of the week
Baker was the series runner-up.
Baker was the series winner.

== Episodes ==
Baker eliminated/withdrew
Star Baker
Winner

=== Episode 1: Cake Week (25 January 2024) ===
For their signature, bakers had ninety minutes to bake a Swiss roll, featuring two flavours. Peter Gordon's mini boiled orange cakes, with pandan custard was set as a technical challenge to be completed in ninety minutes. For the showstopper challenge, the bakers had to create a double-sided reveal cake in four hours, with one side of the cake representing who the baker is as a person, and the other side their family.

Baker	Signature (Swiss Roll)	Technical (Mini Boiled Orange Cakes, with Pandan Custard)	Showstopper (Double-sided Reveal Cake)
Aidan	Apple Crumble Swiss Roll Hybrid	3rd	Curtis-Sea Jaffa Cake
Anna	Clara the Caterpillar	5th	"Who is Anna?" Funfetti Cake
Chantelle	Chocolate & Coffee Swiss Roll	4th	Music and Camping Cake
Danielle	Spiced Roll with Fruit & Fragrance	6th	Pink & Blue Vanilla Caramel and Sticky Date Cakes
Devoney	Pistachio Roll with Sour Plums & Cream	9th	After Midnight Chocolate Cake
Josephine	Earl Grey & Poached Pear Swiss Roll	1st	A Cake of Two Twins
Josh	Strawberries & Cream with a Twist	10th	Wedding and Weight Loss
Lillian	Chocolate Roll with Banoffee Filling	7th	A Journey from Honiara to Beekeeping
Paul	Pistachio Roll with Cherry & White Chocolate	8th	Life Story and Love of Travel
Sally	Belgian Biscuit Inspired Roll	2nd	Gamer vs Nature

=== Episode 2: Biscuit Week (01 February 2024) ===
For their signature, bakers had ninety minutes to bake eight filled biscuits, with at least two flavour components. The technical challenge was to make ten Flødebollers within ninety minutes. For the showstopper challenge, the bakers had four hours to create an historical scene made using biscuits. Due to Peter Gordon being unavailable, this challenge was judged by Jordon Rondel alone.

Baker	Signature (Filled Biscuits)	Technical (Flødebollers)	Showstopper (Historical Moment using Biscuits)
Aidan	Afghan with Walnut Buttercream	9th	Anzac Day Memorial
Anna	Toasted Coconut and Raspberry Jammie Dodger	2nd	Rihanna Superbowl Half-Time Show
Chantelle	Lemon Melting Moments with Vanilla Buttercream	6th	Mother of the Nation
Danielle	Flourless Black Forest Cookies	3rd	The Fall of the Berlin Wall
Devoney	Carrot Cake and Almond Cookies	4th	Extinction of the Dinosaurs
Josephine	Alfajores	1st	Prehistoric Impact
Josh	Carrot Cake and Raisin Cookies	7th	Marriage Equality Bill Passing
Lillian	Chocolate Orange Sandwich Cookies	8th	The Queen's Passing
Sally	Honey and Almond Blossom Linzers	5th	The Royal Wedding William and Kate

=== Episode 3: Free-From Week (08 February 2024) ===
Due to Peter Gordon being unavailable, Michael Van de Elzen joined Jorden Rondel to judge this episode. For the Signature dish, the bakers had two hours to make a savoury vegetarian pie. The technical challenge was to make Jordon's vegan mulled wine and blackberry cake within two hours, with Jordon supplying instructions from the front of the shed. For the showstopper challenge, the bakers had four hours to create a dairy-free mousse and jelly art cake.

Baker	Signature (Vegetarian Pie)	Technical (Vegan Mulled Wine and Blackberry Cake)	Showstopper (Dairy-free Mousse and Jelly Art Cake)
Aidan	Creamy Leek & Potato Pie	5th	PB & J
Anna	Butter Paneer Pie	1st	Chocolate Blood Orange Jelly Mousse Cake
Chantelle	Potato Top Pie	6th	Berry Medley Mousse Cake
Danielle	Kūmara & Red Lentil Dahl Pie	4th	Orange Chocolate & Cointreau Mousse Cake
Devoney	Veggie Patch Pie	2nd	Guava, Apple & Coconut Entremet
Josephine	Rendang Potato Top Pie	8th	Java Jelly Avocado Mousse Cake
Josh	Samosa Pie	7th	Banoffee Mousse Cake
Sally	Gluten-Free Creamy Mushroom Pie	3rd	Summer Cocktail Dessert

=== Episode 4: Bread Week (15 February 2024) ===
For the signature dish, the bakers had two hours to make eight burger buns, two of which then being served as burgers. Judging was done by Jordon Rondel and Hayley Sproull. The technical challenge was to make a decorated focaccia bread, using a rēwena starter, within two hours. Judging for that challenge was done by Jordon. For the showstopper challenge, the bakers had four hours to create a Pull-Apart Sweetbread Centre-piece. Peter Gordon returned, to join Jordon to judge this challenge.

Baker	Signature (Burger Buns)	Technical (Decorated Focaccia)	Showstopper (Pull-Apart Sweetbread Centre-piece)
Aidan	Juicy Venison Burgers	2nd	Ode to the Millennium Dome
Anna	Cajun Chicken Burgers	1st	Carnavale Croquem-Buns
Chantelle	Cajun Veggie Burgers	3rd	Spiced Apple Flower Tower
Danielle	Classic Beef Burgers	5th	Boozy Bread Dome
Devoney	Secret Veggie Beef Burgers	4th	Braided Berry Bread
Josephine	Funky Blue Cheese Burgers	6th	Indonesian Inspired Stack
Sally	Jammy Beef Burgers	7th	Brioche Ballerina

=== Episode 5: Dessert Week (22 February 2024) ===
For the Signature dish, the bakers had two hours to make six small misu-style desserts. The technical challenge was to make Jordan's poached rhubarb tart within two hours. For the showstopper challenge, the bakers had four hours to create a bombe dessert.

Baker	Signature (Misu-style Desserts)	Technical (Poached Rhubarb Tart)	Showstopper (Bombe Dessert)
Aidan	Strawberry, Irish Cream & Caramel Misu	5th	Chocket Rocket
Anna	Chocolate Hazelnut Rumisu	6th	White Chocolate, Plum & Pistachio Bombe
Danielle	Strawberry & Brandy Misu	3rd	Death by Chocolate
Devoney	Strawberry & Cream Misu	2nd	Black Forest Bombe
Josephine	Kaya Misu	4th	Mont Bombe
Sally	Earl Grey & Chocolate Misu	1st	Plum, Ginger & Caramel Bombe

=== Episode 6: Sugar Week (29 February 2024) ===
For the Signature dish, the bakers had two hours to make twelve Middle Eastern pastries. The technical challenge was to make Peter's sugar six ways dessert within two hours. The dessert contains six different types of sugar; coconut, brown, raw, caster sugar, golden caster, and maple syrup. For the showstopper challenge, the bakers had four hours to create a fairytale-themed krokan-bouche, a hybrid of the croquembouche and krokan.

Baker	Signature (Middle Eastern Pastries)	Technical (Sugar Six Ways)	Showstopper (Krokan-Bouche)
Aidan	Baklava Ricotta Cigars	5th	Krokan the Beanstalk
Anna	Turkish Baklava	2nd	Rapunzel's Croquem Krokan
Danielle	Chocolate Baklava	4th	Toffee Apple Cinderella "Ever After"
Devoney	Knafeh	3rd	The Tower of Terror: An Orange Scented Nightmare
Sally	Fig and Honey Baklava	1st	The Swan Princess

=== Episode 7: Whānau Week (7 March 2024) ===
For the Signature dish, the bakers had two hours to make a jigsaw slice, made up of three layers and cut into twenty evenly-sized pieces. The technical challenge was to make Death by Chocolate within two hours. For the showstopper challenge, the bakers had half an hour to design, and then four hours to create, a child's birthday cake.

Baker	Signature (Jigsaw Slice)	Technical (Death by Chocolate)	Showstopper (Child's Birthday Cake)
Anna	Banana & Brown Butter Caramel Slice	1st	Sparkly Princess Kataleiya the Party Llama Cake
Danielle	Cinnamon, Pear & Panna Cotta Slice	3rd	Strawberry Mermaid Cake
Devoney	Busy Bee Ginger Slice	4th	Time to Party Cake
Sally	Chocolate Orange Butterfly Slice	2nd	Tropical Mermaid Cake

=== Episode 8: Season Final (14 March 2024) ===
For the Signature dish, the bakers had one hour 45 minutes to make four savoury soufflés, with an accompanying sauce or gravy. The technical challenge was to make a high tea, consisting of two sweet and one savoury bakes, and incorporating elements of their previous bakes. For the showstopper challenge, the bakers had four hours to create an anti-gravity illusion cake.

Baker	Signature (Savoury Soufflé)	Technical (High Tea)	Showstopper (Anti-gravity Illusion Cake)
Anna	Salmon Soufflé	3rd	Sticky Toffee Witch's Cauldron
Devoney	Pea and Gruyère Soufflé	1st	Reg the Raspberry Racehorse
Sally	Parmesan and Gruyère Soufflé	2nd	Let's Build a Sandcastle
