= The Great Kiwi Bake Off season 1 =

The Great Kiwi Bake Off
- Season 1
- Starring: Hayley Sproull; Madeleine Sami; Dean Brettschneider; Sue Fleischl
- No. of episodes: 10

Release
- Original network: TVNZ 2
- Original release: 16 October – 18 December 2018

Season chronology
- Next → Season 2

The first season of The Great Kiwi Bake Off premiered on TVNZ 2 on 16 October 2018 and was hosted by Hayley Sproull and Madeleine Sami with Dean Brettschneider and Sue Fleischl serving as judges. With the exception of the finale, each episode had two bakes out of the typical Signature, Technical and Showstopper format of Bake Off franchises.

The season was won by Annabel Coulter with Stacey Johnsen, Jeff Poole and Hannah Ward finishing as runner-ups.

== Bakers ==
Ages, names, and hometowns stated are at time of filming.

Bakers of The Great Kiwi Bake Off Season 1
Baker	Age	Occupation	Hometown	Outcome
Annabel Coulter	19	Student	Timaru	Winner
Hannah Ward	33	Teacher	Wellington	Runners-Up
Jeff Poole	49	Communications Consultant	New Plymouth	Runners-Up
Stacey Johnsen	29	Body Piercer	Invercargill	Runners-Up
Larissa Wilson	22	Mechanical Engineering Student	Christchurch	5th Place
Joel Arnold	24	Landscaper	Hamilton	6th Place
Clayton Barnett	39	TV Producer	Auckland	7th Place
Sonali Thakur	44	Flight Attendant	Auckland	8th Place
Vanessa Bradley	48	Business Owner	Auckland	9th Place
Shannon Patangata	41	IT Analyst	Wellington	10th Place
Ana Djokovic	28	HR Advisor	Auckland	11th Place
Jennie Verstappen	27	Registered Dietician	Tauranga	12th Place

== Bakers progress ==
Elimination chart
Baker	1	2	3	4	5	6	7	8	9 (Note: During the Showstopper challenge, Annabel became ill and required medical treatment. As she was unable to finish her bake, the judges decided that no one would be eliminated during Chocolate Week.)	10
Annabel	SB	HIGH	SB	SAFE	HIGH	SAFE	SAFE	HIGH	SAFE	WINNER
Hannah	SAFE	LOW	SAFE	SAFE	HIGH	SB	SAFE	SAFE	HIGH	Runner-up
Jeff	LOW	SAFE	SAFE	LOW	SB	SAFE	HIGH	LOW	SB	Runner-up
Stacey	HIGH	SB	SAFE	LOW	SAFE	HIGH	LOW	SB	HIGH	Runner-up
Larissa	SAFE	LOW	LOW	SAFE	SAFE	LOW	SB	OUT		
Joel	SAFE	SAFE	SAFE	HIGH	LOW	SAFE	OUT			
Clayton	SAFE	HIGH	HIGH	SAFE	SAFE	OUT				
Sonali	HIGH	SAFE	SAFE	SB	OUT					
Vanessa	SAFE	SAFE	HIGH	OUT						
Shannon	LOW	SAFE	OUT							
Ana	SAFE	OUT								
Jennie	OUT									

Colour key:

Baker got through to the next round.
Baker was eliminated
Baker was one of the judges' least favourite bakers that week, but was not eliminated.
Baker was one of the judges' favourite bakers that week.
Baker was Star Baker of the week
Baker was the series runner-up.
Baker was the series winner.

== Episodes ==
Baker eliminated
Star Baker
Winner

=== Episode 1: Cake ===
For the signature challenge, the bakers had to bake 24 cupcakes with up to two flavours in two hours. For the showstopper challenge, the bakers had to bake the ultimate kid's birthday cake in four hours.

Baker	Signature (24 Cupcakes)	Showstopper (Birthday Cake)
Ana	Maple Bacon & Lemon Curd Cupcakes	Ombre Ice Cream Surprise Cake
Annabel	Coconut Raspberry & Tiramisu Cupcakes	Buzzy Bee Cake
Clayton	Lemon Sunflower Surprise & Dulce De Leche Cupcakes	Jurassic Kowhai Park Chocolate Cake
Hannah	Maple Pecan & Orange Chocolate Cupcakes	Mermaid Cake
Jeff	Tiramisu & Raspberry Lemon Cupcakes	Tantrum Cake
Jennie	Beetroot Red Velvet & Coffee Maple Walnut Cupcakes	Igloo Cake
Joel	Lemon & Red Velvet Cupcakes	Volcano Cake
Larissa	Piña Colada & Tiramisu Cupcakes	Rabbit Garden Cake
Shannon	Rhubarb Custard & Lemon Passionfruit Cupcakes	Ice Cream Sundae Cake
Stacey	Mixed Berry Chocolate & Salted Caramel Cupcakes	Ice Cream Drip Cake
Sonali	Luck of the Irish & Lemon Meringue Cupcakes	Under the Sea Cake
Vanessa	Lime Coconut & Vanilla Raspberry Cupcakes	Unicorn Cake

=== Episode 2: Kiwi Classics ===
For the technical challenge set by Sue, the bakers had one hour and thirty minutes to bake an upside-down pineapple cake. For the signature challenge, the bakers had to bake 12 identical slices with three components in one hour and thirty minutes.

Baker	Technical (Upside-Down Pineapple Cake)	Signature (12 Slices)
Ana	11th	Caramel & Peanut Slices
Annabel	6th	Hokey Pokey Ginger Crunch Slices
Clayton	9th	Level Up Louise Slices
Hannah	5th	Caramel Hokey Pokey Slices
Jeff	1st	Chocolate Three Nut Slices
Joel	2nd	Hazelnut Caramel Slices
Larissa	4th	Banoffee Pie Slices
Shannon	8th	Orange, Cardamom and Walnut Caramel Slices
Stacey	3rd	Chocolate, Caramel & Marshmallow Slices
Sonali	10th	Mandarin, Frangipane & Thyme Slices
Vanessa	7th	Ginger Crunch Slices

=== Episode 3: Dessert ===
For the technical challenge set by Sue, the bakers had one hour and thirty minutes to bake a raspberry chocolate roulade in the shape of a tree branch. For the signature challenge, the bakers had to bake a pavlova with a layer of curd, an element of whipped cream, and at least three layers in two hours and thirty minutes.

Baker	Technical (Raspberry Chocolate Roulade)	Showstopper (Pavlova)
Annabel	1st	Kiwifruit and Lime Pavlova
Clayton	5th	Drunken Pavlova
Hannah	6th	Pineapple and White Chocolate Pavlova
Jeff	2nd	Pavlova with Pomegranate Jelly
Joel	3rd	Black Forest Pavlova
Larissa	8th	Chocolate and Raspberry Pavlova
Shannon	9th	Strawberry and Mango Pavlova
Stacey	4th	Hazelnut Pavlova
Sonali	10th	Pavlova with Rose Water and Rosemary
Vanessa	7th	Pavlova with Limoncello

=== Episode 4: Bread ===
For the technical challenge set by Dean, the bakers had two hours to bake two four-strand braided challah loaves as well as a homemade lemon surd and butter. For the signature challenge, the bakers had to bake 12 scones, 6 sweet and 6 savoury, in one hour and thirty minutes.

Baker	Technical (Challah)	Signature (12 Scones)
Annabel	2nd	Mandarin Scones & Sun-Dried Tomato & Feta Scones
Clayton	4th	Cinnamon, Date & Walnut Pinwheels & Pumpkin, Spinach & Feta Scones
Hannah	9th	Buttermilk & White Chocolate Scones & Pepperdew, Spinach & Feta Scones
Jeff	6th	Lebkuchengewürz Scones & Kumara, Cheese & Bacon Scones
Joel	3rd	Date & Orange Scones & Cheese & Spinach Scones
Larissa	5th	Apple & Allspice Pinwheels & Sun-Dried Tomato, Spinach & Feta Scones
Stacey	8th	Lemon Scones & Tomato & Smoked Cheddar Scones
Sonali	1st	Cranberry, Ginger & White Chocolate Scones & Paneer & Sun-Dried Tomato Scones
Vanessa	7th	Cinnamon & Pecan Pinwheels & Bacon & Onion Scones

=== Episode 5: Biscuit ===
For the technical challenge set by Dean, the bakers had one hour and fifteen minutes to bake 10 Belgian biscuits. For the showstopper challenge, the bakers had to bake and construct a biscuit landmark, with a personal connection to the baker, in three hours and thirty minutes.

Baker	Technical (10 Belgian Biscuits)	Showstopper (Biscuit Landmark)
Annabel	5th	Craighead Diocesan School Chapel
Clayton	3rd	Oh Beehive Yourself Gingerbread Government
Hannah	4th	Lighthouse
Jeff	6th	La Tour Eiffel
Joel	8th	Cookie Swing Bridge
Larissa	2nd	Larnach Castle
Stacey	1st	Invercargill Water Tower
Sonali	7th	Birdhouse of Love

=== Episode 6: Pie and Tart ===
For the technical challenge set by Dean, the bakers had one hour and thirty minutes to bake a Linzer torte. For the signature challenge, the bakers had to bake a family pie in two hours and thirty minutes.

Baker	Technical (Linzer Torte)	Signature (Family Pie)
Annabel	2nd	Peach, Pear & Basil Pie
Clayton	6th	Goodbye Pulled Pork Pie
Hannah	3rd	Chicken, Bacon & Pesto Pie
Jeff	7th	Blackberry & Custard Pie
Joel	4th	Chicken & Leek Pie
Larissa	5th	Chicken Tikka Pie
Stacey	1st	Triple Berry Pie

=== Episode 7: Free From ===
For the technical challenge set by Dean, the bakers had two hours to bake an orange & lavender gluten-free cake. For the showstopper challenge, the bakers had to bake a two-tiered gluten-free cheesecake in three hours.

Baker	Technical (Orange & Lavender Gluten-Free Cake)	Showstopper (Gluten-Free Cheesecake)
Annabel	3rd	Mocha & Chai Latte Cheesecakes
Hannah	2nd	Spiced Pumpkin & Chocolate Caramel Cheesecakes
Jeff	4th	Pumpkin, Ginger & White Chocolate and Tamarillo Cheesecakes
Joel	5th	Lemon & Lime Cheesecakes
Larissa	1st	Raspberry, White Chocolate & Rhubarb Ginger Cheesecakes
Stacey	6th	Raspberry & Lemon Cheesecakes

=== Episode 8: Pastry ===
For the technical challenge set by Dean, the bakers had two hours to bake 12 retro choux swans. For the signature challenge, the bakers had to bake 12 breakfast pastries, 6 sweet and 6 savoury, in two hours and thirty minutes.

Baker	Technical (12 Retro Choux Swans)	Signature (12 Breakfast Pastries)
Annabel	5th	Date, Pecan and Orange Sweet Pastries & Broccoli & Parmesan Savoury Pastries
Hannah	3rd	Hazelnut Sticky Sweet Pastries & Salmon & Cream Cheese Savoury Pastries
Jeff	1st	Katlama Sweet Pastries & Khachapuri Savoury Pastries
Larissa	4th	Creme Pat & Apricot Sweet Pastries & Egg & Bacon Savoury Pastries
Stacey	2nd	Apple & Cinnamon Croissants & Prosciutto & Gruyere Croissants

=== Episode 9: Chocolate (Semi-Final) ===
For the technical challenge set by Sue, the bakers had one hour and fifteen minutes to bake two chocolate soufflés. For the showstopper challenge, the bakers had three hours to bake a chocolate cake with at least two layers, white, milk and dark chocolate, and tempered chocolate decorations.

Baker	Technical (2 Chocolate Soufflés)	Showstopper (Chocolate Cake)
Annabel	3rd	"Walk in the Woods" and Chocolate Toadstools (Did not complete due to illness)
Hannah	1st	Chocolate Cherry Truffle Cake
Jeff	2nd	Chocolate Mousse Cake
Stacey	4th	White Chocolate Cake With Strawberry Mousse

=== Episode 10: Kiwi Picnic (Final) ===
For the showstopper challenge, the bakers had one hour and thirty minutes to bake 24 identical sausage rolls. For the technical challenge set by Dean, the bakers had two hours and thirty minutes to bake 12 Chelsea buns. For the showstopper challenge, the bakers had to bake an illusion cake, which had to resemble an item taken to a picnic, in five hours.

Baker	Signature (24 Sausage Rolls)	Technical (12 Chelsea Buns)	Showstopper (Illusion Cake)
Annabel	Sage & Smoked Paprika Sausage Rolls	3rd	"Fish and Chip Picnic at the Beach" Cake
Hannah	Chicken & Vegetable Sausage Rolls	4th	"Picnic Hamper with Flowers" Cake
Jeff	Pork, Beef, Carrot, Kumara & Red Onion Sausage Rolls	1st	"Bread, Butter & Oranges" Cake
Stacey	"Southern Man" Sausage Rolls	2nd	"Burger & Fries" Cake
