= The Great Kiwi Bake Off season 4 =

The Great Kiwi Bake Off
- Season 4
- Presented by: Hayley Sproull; Pax Assadi
- Judges: Peter Gordon; Jordan Rondel
- Winner: Brooke Walker
- Runners-up: Jonathan Willows; Victoria Hume
- Location: Parihoa Farm, Muriwai, Auckland
- No. of episodes: 8

Release
- Original network: TVNZ 1 TVNZ+
- Original release: 25 August – 13 October 2022

Season chronology
- ← Previous; Season 3 Next → Season 5

The fourth season of The Great Kiwi Bake Off return to Parihoa Farm in Muriwai, Auckland. This season premiered on Thursday 25 August at 7.30pm on TVNZ 1 and streams on TVNZ+; with Comedian Pax Assadi who joined Hayley Sproull as co-host and chef, restaurateur, writer, and food consultant Peter Gordon, alongside Jordan Rondel, an author and co-founder of international cakery The Caker took over the judging roles.

Brooke Walker, a marketing coordinator from Auckland, won the fourth season of The Great Kiwi Bake Off. Jonathan Willows and Victoria Hume were the other two finalists.

== Bakers ==
Ages, names, and hometowns stated are at time of filming.

Bakers of The Great Kiwi Bake Off Season 4
Baker	Age	Occupation	Hometown	Outcome
Brooke Walker	28	Marketing Coordinator	Auckland	Winner
Jonathan Willows	53	Sales Manager	Auckland	Runners-Up
Victoria Hume	27	Public Servant	Wellington	Runners-Up
Monique Harris	35	Art Teacher	Pahiatua	4th place
Lucas Neal	27	Theatre Set Designer	Wellington	5th place
Hugo Bussell	28	Public Servant	Wellington	6th place
Kee-Hee Lee	30	Piano Teacher	Auckland	7th place
Nikita Day	27	Lawyer	Christchurch	8th place
Francesca Boyle	27	Former Ballerina	Wellington	9th place
Katrina Keenan	51	Former White Fern	Christchurch	10th place

== Bakers progress ==
Progress of bakers including rank/position in each episode
Baker	Episode							
Baker	1	2	3	4	5	6	7	8
Brooke	SAFE	SAFE	HIGH	SAFE	LOW	SB	SAFE	WINNER
Jonathan	SAFE	HIGH	SAFE	SB	HIGH	SAFE	HIGH	Runner-up
Victoria	HIGH	SB	SB	LOW	HIGH	SAFE	SB	Runner-up
Monique	SAFE	SAFE	HIGH	SAFE	LOW	LOW	OUT	
Lucas	SAFE	HIGH	SAFE	HIGH	SB	OUT		
Hugo	SB	SAFE	LOW	SAFE	OUT			
Kee-Hee	LOW	LOW	SAFE	OUT				
Nikita	SAFE	SAFE	OUT					
Francesca	LOW	OUT						
Katrina	OUT							

Colour key:

Baker got through to the next round.
Baker was eliminated
Baker was one of the judges' least favourite bakers that week, but was not eliminated.
Baker was one of the judges' favourite bakers that week.
Baker was Star Baker of the week
Baker was the series runner-up.
Baker was the series winner.

== Episodes ==
Baker eliminated/withdrew
Star Baker
Winner

=== Episode 1: Cake Week (25 August 2022) ===
Bakers had two hours to bake their signature drizzle cake. Jordan's famous Crème brûlée cake was set as a technical challenge to be completed in two hours. For the showstopper challenge, the bakers had to bake an "Inside out cake" in four hours, a cake representing the bakers' flavours as an adult and a decorated cake symbolising their youth.

Baker	Signature (Drizzle Cake)	Technical (Crème brûlée cake)	Showstopper ("Inside Out Cake")
Brooke	Lemon, Raspberry and Poppy Seed Drizzle Cake	1st	Mocha Beach Cake
Francesca	Spiced Pear Caramel Drizzle Cake	10th	Mum's Music Box
Hugo	Persian Love Cake	9th	'Tottenham Memories' Cake
Jonathan	Middle Eastern Inspired Drizzle Cake	3rd	Seaside Beach Hut Cake
Katrina	Lemon & Passionfruit Drizzle Cake	8th	Blue & White China Chocolate Cake
Kee-Hee	Lemon & Blueberry Drizzle Cake	5th	Game Night Cake
Lucas	Orange & Cardamom Cake	4th	Mai Tai Treasure Box Cake
Monique	Coconut, Pineapple & Malibu Drizzle Cake	6th	'Starry Night' Cake
Nikita	Gin Drizzle Cake	7th	Musical Dirty Vanilla Chai Cake
Victoria	Lime & Coconut Drizzle Cake	2nd	'Espresso Martinis in the Secret Garden' Cake

=== Episode 2: Biscuits Week (1 September 2022) ===
Bakers have 90 minutes to bake their signature 24 identical shortbread biscuits of their choice. Peter set this week’s 90 minutes technical bake with Italian's Pistachio Sbricciolona. Bakers had 4 hours to bake their favourite meal-inspired biscuits for their showstopper.

Baker	Signature (Shortbread)	Technical (Pistachio Sbricciolona)	Showstopper (Meal-inspired Biscuits)
Brooke	Spiced Shortbread	2nd	Tacos
Francesca	Rose Shortbread	6th	Cheeseboard
Hugo	Pecan Espresso Shortbread Sandwiches	8th	Biscuit Pizza
Jonathan	Shortbread Swirls	5th	Brekkie Bickie 5 Ways
Kee-Hee	Mint Chocolate Shortbread	9th	Chimac
Lucas	Lemon Honey Ginger Shortbread	4th	Ramen Bowl
Monique	Savoury Shortbread	1st	Biscuit Soldiers
Nikita	Lemon & Ginger Shortbread	3rd	Chicken Burger
Victoria	Shortbread Ice Creams	7th	Boujee Brunch

=== Episode 3: Retro Classics Week (8 September 2022) ===
Taking a step back in time, our 8 remaining bakers take on retro classics. Perfecting pastry proves problematic for some, while tiny tarts get golden reviews. Bakers have 4 hours to bake their "decade-inspired" two-tier cake.

Baker	Signature (Quiche)	Technical (Neenish tart)	Showstopper (Decade-inspired)
Brooke	Back to Basics Vegetarian Quiche	3rd	Regency Wedding Cake
Hugo	70's Flower Quiche	8th	French Revolution Cake
Jonathan	Pōhutukawa Tree Quiche	4th	70's Punk Disco Cake
Kee-Hee	Retro Zucchini Quiche	6th	50's Diner Cake
Lucas	Beetroot & Goat's Cheese Quiche	7th	80's Keith Haring Tribute Cake
Monique	Crossdale Man Quiche	2nd	60's POP ART! Cake
Nikita	Simple Works Best Quiche	5th	70's Disco Cake
Victoria	Floral Bouquet Quiche	1st	Shagadelic Kombi Cake

=== Episode 4: Desserts Week (15 September 2022) ===
Bakers are required to baked or set cheesecakes in 2 hours. A mystery technical bake stuns even the best of bakers. A 5-layered free-standing Truffle Terrine is expected to be completed in 4 and half hours.

Baker	Signature (Cheesecakes)	Technical (Quince crumble tart)	Showstopper (Truffle Terrine)
Brooke	Chocolate Sesame Cheesecakes	3rd	White Chocolate & Pistachio Trifle Terrine
Hugo	Blueberry & Lime Cheesecakes	5th	Passionfruit & Chai Trifle Terrine
Jonathan	Cheesecake with Raspberry Glaze	7th	Asian Inspired Trifle Terrine
Kee-Hee	Espresso Cheesecakes	6th	Macha & Mango Trifle Terrine
Lucas	Cherry Garcia Cheesecakes	2nd	Peanut Butter & Jelly Trifle Terrine
Monique	Neopolitan Cheesecakes	1st	Banoffee Trifle Terrine
Victoria	Mini Mint Chocolate Cheesecakes	4th	Peach Melba Trifle Terrine

=== Episode 5: Kiwi Bakery Week (22 September 2022) ===
The kiwi bakery pie gets a gourmet makeover in 4 hours! Then, the bakers battle in the technical challenge to perfect the perfect pastry for Custard Squares in 135 minutes and things get fruity with a tarty showstopper that’s bound to wow the judges

Baker	Signature (Kiwi Bakery Pie)	Technical (Custard square)	Showstopper (Glazed Fruit tart)
Brooke	Potato Top Pies	3rd	White Chocolate Custard & Raspberry Tart
Hugo	Paprika Chicken, Mushroom & Leek Pies	6th	Mango, Kiwi & Strawberry Glazed Fruit Tart
Jonathan	Wagyu Beef & Red Wine Cheese Pies	4th	Glazed Fruit Tart with Orange Almond Sponge
Lucas	Mince, Cheese and Hashbrown Pies	2nd	Rhubarb and Star Go to Vista Del Mar
Monique	Creamed Pāua Mince and Cheese Pies	1st	Yin Yang Glazed Fruity Custard Tart
Victoria	Keema Matar Aloo Pies	5th	Lime & Mango Tart with Glazed Summer Fruits

=== Episode 6: International Week (29 September 2022) ===
The competition kicks up a notch with international week! A towering technical calls for a guest expert, and the stakes are higher than ever as they put their best choux forward. During the Technical Challenge, Master Chocolatier Thomas Schnetzler provided advice to the bakers.

Baker	Signature (Savoury Crêpe)	Technical (Dobos Torte)	Showstopper (Paris-Brest)
Brooke	Green Eggs & Ham Crêpe	1st	Strawberry Shortcake Flower
Jonathan	Taste of India Crêpe	5th	Croquem-Brest
Lucas	Smoked Salmon & Cream Cheese Crêpe	2nd	White Chocolate Macadamia Paris-Brest
Monique	Seared Steak & Roasted Tomato Crêpe	3rd	Caramelised Pear & Walnut Paris-Brest
Victoria	Goat's Feta, Spinach & Ricotta Crêpe	4th	Strawberry Paris-Brest

=== Episode 7: Chocolate Week (6 October 2022) ===
We're chock full of semi-final baking bliss for Chocolate week! The remaining four bakers gnash their teeth over chocolate ganache and tackle a unique Jordan Rondel mystery bake.

Baker	Signature (Chocolate cake)	Technical (Miso, caramelised white chocolate, and sesame cake)	Showstopper (Entremet)
Brooke	Chocolate & Ginger Cake	2nd	Tiramisu Entremet
Jonathan	Grown Up Chocolate Frenzy Cake	4th	Ode to Otago Entremet
Monique	Chocolate & Passionfruit Cake	1st	Peanut Caramel Entremet
Victoria	Malt Chocolate & Black Doris Plum Indulgence	3rd	Chocolat à L'orange

=== Episode 8: Season Final (13 October 2022) ===
10 bakers started, now, just three remain, but only one can be crowned winner of The Great Kiwi Bake Off NZ. With three more challenges to go, who will be named the winner?

Baker	Signature (Macarons)	Technical (Black Doris Plum Cake with Pavlova Mess and Plum Jelly)	Showstopper (Animated Character Cake)
Brooke	Crème Brûlée & Afghan Macarons	3rd	Ice Queen
Jonathan	Raspberry Pistachio, & Black Sesame Seed Macarons	1st	Ollie the Octopus
Victoria	Apple Pie & Sour Peach Macarons	2nd	Flowerpot
