= The Great Kiwi Bake Off season 2 =

The Great Kiwi Bake Off
- Season 2
- Starring: Hayley Sproull; Madeleine Sami; Dean Brettschneider; Sue Fleischl
- No. of episodes: 8

Release
- Original network: TVNZ 2
- Original release: 3 November – 22 December 2019

Season chronology
- ← Previous; Season 1 Next → Season 3

The second season of The Great Kiwi Bake Off premiered on TVNZ 2 on 3 November 2019 with hosts Hayley Sproull and Madeleine Sami and judges Dean Brettschneider and Sue Fleischl returning for the season. This season saw each episode expanded to ninety-minutes and featured the Signature, Technical, and Showstopper challenges on every episode instead of just the finale like the previous season.

The season was won by Trevor "Trev" Hall with Heather Andrew and Naomi Toilalo finishing as runner-ups.

== Bakers ==
Ages, names, and hometowns stated are at time of filming.

Bakers of The Great Kiwi Bake Off Season 2
Baker	Age	Occupation	Hometown	Outcome
Trevor "Trev" Hall	47	Efficiency Coach	Havelock North	Winner
Heather Andrew	24	Farmer	Mount Linton Station	Runners-up
Naomi Toilalo	37	Stay-at-Home Mum	Auckland	Runners-up
Louise Ing	26	Building Regulatory Consultant	Wellington	4th Place
Ethan Laby	21	Accounting Student	Christchurch	5th Place
Ana Hetem	52	Life Coach	Wellington	6th Place
Anadil Sameen	25	Civil Engineer	Auckland	7th Place
Emma Barker	19	Student	Ōtorohanga	8th Place
Anna Howley	28	Solution Sales Specialist	Napier	9th Place
Donna Ridings	58	Health and Safety Advisor	Milton	10th Place

== Bakers progress ==
Elimination chart
Baker	1	2	3	4	5	6	7	8
Trev	HIGH	HIGH	HIGH	SB	HIGH	SB	SAFE	WINNER
Heather	SB	SAFE	SB	SAFE	SB	LOW	SB	Runner-up
Naomi	LOW	SB	SAFE	HIGH	HIGH	SB	SAFE	Runner-up
Louise	SAFE	SAFE	HIGH	LOW	LOW	SAFE	OUT	
Ethan	HIGH	LOW	SAFE	HIGH	LOW	OUT		
Ana	SAFE	SAFE	LOW	LOW	OUT			
Anadil	LOW	HIGH	SAFE	OUT				
Emma	SAFE	LOW	OUT					
Anna	SAFE	OUT						
Donna	OUT							

Colour key:

Baker got through to the next round.
Baker was eliminated
Baker was one of the judges' least favourite bakers that week, but was not eliminated.
Baker was one of the judges' favourite bakers that week.
Baker was Star Baker of the week
Baker was the series runner-up.
Baker was the series winner.

== Episodes ==
Baker eliminated
Star Baker
Winner

=== Episode 1: Cake ===
For the signature challenge, the bakers had to bake 12 lamingtons in two hours. For the technical challenge set by Sue, the bakers had ninety minutes to bake a Battenberg cake. For the showstopper challenge, the bakers had to bake a two-tiered mirrored glazed cake that reflected the baker's personality in four hours.

Baker	Signature (12 Lamingtons)	Technical (Battenberg Cake)	Showstopper (Two-Tiered Mirror Glazed Cake)
Ana	Traditional Lamingtons with a Twist	9th	My Base & My Soul Mirror Cake
Anadil	Turkish Delight Lamingtons	7th	Tropical Mirror Cake
Anna	Lemon & Passionfruit Lamingtons	6th	Princess Anna Rose Mirror Cake
Donna	Pina Colada Lamingtons	5th	Tye Dyed Mirror Cake
Emma	Passionfruit & White Chocolate Lamingtons	2nd	Everything Pink Mirror Cake
Ethan	Jaffa Lamingtons	8th	Anti-Bullying Mirror Cake
Heather	Lime & Pistachio Lamingtons	3rd	Pāua Mirror Cake
Louise	Peanut Butter & Jelly Lamingtons	4th	Marble Pillar Mirror Cake
Naomi	Tiramisu Lamingtons	10th	Chocolate & Coffee Mirror Cake
Trev	Lemon & Passionfruit Lamingtons	1st	From the Dark to the Light Mirror Cake

=== Episode 2: Biscuits ===
For the signature challenge, the bakers had to bake 24 identical savoury sandwich biscuits in two hours. For the technical challenge set by Sue, the bakers had seventy-five minutes to bake 36 macarons, 18 dark chocolate & orange and 18 white chocolate & raspberry. For the showstopper challenge, the bakers had to bake a 3-D biscuit selfie that reflected a photograph of the baker in a memorable place in four hours.

Baker	Signature (24 Savoury Sandwich Biscuits)	Technical (36 Macarons)	Showstopper (3-D Biscuit Selfie)
Ana	Mediterranean Biscuits	8th	"A Trip From Brazil To New Zealand"
Anadil	Cheese Masala Shortbread with Tomato Chilli Relish	6th	"Monkey Thief In Bali"
Anna	Savoury Sundried Tomato & Basil Sandwich Biscuits	7th	"My First Crossfit Competition"
Emma	Olive Biscuit with Honey Cheese and Goats Cheese Mousse	9th	"Rowing Team Selfie"
Ethan	Walnut Biscuit with date Chutney & Whipped Cream Cheese	1st	"Cairns Holiday Highlights"
Heather	Turmeric Jeera Biscuits with Roasted Pumpkin & Garlic Hummus	4th	"Milford Sound Kayaking"
Louise	Creamy Mushroom Shortbread Biscuits	2nd	"Southern Alps Selfie"
Naomi	Parmesan & Thyme Shortbread Filled with Bacon, Cream Cheese & Pine Nuts	3rd	"The Most Important Things In My Life"
Trev	Blue Cheese & Walnut Cookies with Smoked Salmon Pate	5th	"Eat Clean, Train Dirty"

=== Episode 3: Celebration ===
For the signature challenge, the bakers had to bake 24 ANZAC biscuits in ninety minutes. For the technical challenge set by Dean, the bakers had three hours to bake 12 hot cross buns. For the showstopper challenge, the bakers had to bake a scary Halloween cake in four hours.

Baker	Signature (24 ANZAC Biscuits)	Technical (12 Hot Cross Buns)	Showstopper (Halloween Cake)
Ana	Macadamia ANZAC Biscuits	5th	The Brain on a Silver Plate
Anadil	Masala Chai & Walnut ANZAC Biscuits	8th	Bleeding Frankenstein Cake
Emma	Pear & Ginger ANZAC Biscuits	6th	Chocolate Black Forest Scare Cake
Ethan	ANZAC Biscuits	1st	Cemetery Spiced Pumpkin Halloween Cake
Heather	Ginger, Orange & Rosemary ANZAC Biscuits	7th	Death by Chocolate
Louise	Apricot ANZAC Biscuits	2nd	Poisonous Apple
Naomi	Cinnamon Scented ANZAC Biscuits	3rd	Monster with Bleeding Brains
Trev	Biscuits of Honour	4th	Ding Dong the Witch is Dead

=== Episode 4: Pastry ===
For the signature challenge, the bakers had to bake a freestanding tart with a pastry base, a custard filling, and fruit in two hours. For the technical challenge set by Dean, the bakers had two-and-a-half hours to bake an apple tarte tatin. For the showstopper challenge, the bakers had to bake and assemble a religieuse à l'ancienne that resembled a nun consisting of two flavours of decorated éclairs and a "head" of profiteroles in four hours.

Baker	Signature (Tart)	Technical (Apple Tarte Tatin)	Showstopper (Religieuse à l'ancienne)
Ana	Pear Paradise Tart	4th	The Nun That Had A Coffee Religieuse À L'Ancienne
Anadil	Spiced Toffee Apple Tart	6th	Almond, Chocolate & Raspberry Religieuse À L'Ancienne
Ethan	Dark Chocolate & Black Doris Plum Tart	3rd	Peanut Butter, Chocolate & Raspberry Religieuse À L'Ancienne
Heather	Rhubarb & Ginger Custard Tart	5th	Mocha & Blackberry Religieuse À L'Ancienne
Louise	Chocolate Vanilla & Orange Tart	7th	Red Bean & Chestnut Religieuse À L'Ancienne
Naomi	Raspberry & Custard Tart	1st	Fruit Choux Mountain Religieuse À L'Ancienne
Trev	Baked Plum & Rhubarb Custard Tart	2nd	Supersized Spicy Boozy Berry Religieuse À L'Ancienne

=== Episode 5: Bread ===
For the signature challenge, the bakers had to bake a 30-centimetre (12 in) diameter pizza in two hours. For the technical challenge set by Dean, the bakers had two-and-a-half hours to bake a chocolate kugelhupf. For the showstopper challenge, the bakers had to bake a bread centrepiece in four hours.

Baker	Signature (Pizza)	Technical (Chocolate Kugelhupf)	Showstopper (Bread Centerpiece)
Ana	Traditional Artichoke & Olive Pizza	5th	Mama's Cheese Garland
Ethan	Pesto Pizza	4th	Turkey
Heather	Ultimate Seafood Pizza	1st	Bevy of Swans
Louise	Cheeseburger Pizza	6th	Basket of Roses
Naomi	Cheesy Bacon Pizza	2nd	Three Tiered Bread Tower
Trev	Family Breakfast Pizza	3rd	Picnic Basket

=== Episode 6: International ===
For the signature challenge, the bakers had to bake 12 identical Cornish pasties in one hour and forty-five minutes. For the technical challenge set by Sue, the bakers had two hours to bake nastars. For the showstopper challenge, the bakers had to bake a freestanding charlotte cake with homemade sponge fingers, a set mousse, and three layers of genoise sponge in four hours.

Baker	Signature (12 Cornish Pasties)	Technical (12 Nastars)	Showstopper (Charlotte Cake)
Ethan	Vegetarian Green Thai Curry Pasties	4th	Lemon Meringue Charlotte Cake
Heather	Pork, Apple & Fennel Pasties	2nd	Chocolate, Mint & Strawberry Charlotte Cake
Louise	Cross Cultural Char Sui Pasties	5th	Chocolate, Lychee & Raspberry Charlotte Cake
Naomi	Taste of Home, Lamb Cornish Pasties	3rd	Cherry Chocolate Charlotte Cake
Trev	'Olde-Worldy' Venison & Bacon Pasties	1st	Raspberry & Lemon Charlotte Cake

=== Episode 7: Dessert (Semi-Final) ===
For the signature challenge, the bakers had to bake six crème brûlées that had to be brûléed traditionally in the oven instead of with a blowtorch in two hours. For the technical challenge set by Sue, the bakers had two hours and thirty minutes to bake 12 Opera cakes. For the showstopper challenge, the bakers had to bake a freestanding jelly creation that was 50% jelly with the rest an edible structure of the bakers' choosing and was at least 20 centimetres (7.9 in) tall in five hours.

Baker	Signature (6 Crème Brûlée)	Technical (12 Opera Cakes)	Showstopper (Jelly Creation)
Heather	Irish Coffee Crème Brûlée	2nd	"Milk for your Coffee"
Louise	Coffee Crème Brûlée	3rd	The Great Pyramids of Jellygpt
Naomi	Vanilla Chai Crème Brûlée	4th	Jelly Beehive
Trev	Passionfruit Crème Brûlée	1st	Double Fault Line Jelly Cake

=== Episode 8: Christmas (Final) ===
For the signature challenge, the bakers had to bake 24 mini Christmas pies in two hours. For the technical challenge set by Dean, the bakers had three hours to bake two Christmas stollens. For the showstopper challenge, the bakers had to bake a 50-centimetre (20 in) Christmas tree meringue with sugar work in five hours.

Baker	Signature (24 Christmas Pies)	Technical (Christmas Stollen)	Showstopper (Christmas Tree Meringue)
Heather	Ginger, Pecan & Cranberry Christmas Pies	1st	Orange & Raspberry Christmas Tree
Naomi	Blueberry & Frangipane Christmas Pies	3rd	I'm Dreaming of a White Christmas Tree
Trev	Fruit Mince & Frangipane Christmas Pies	2nd	Meringue & Macaron Christmas Tree
