= Have You Been Paying Attention? (New Zealand game show) =

New Zealand comedy TV series

- Genre: Game show
- Based on: Have You Been Paying Attention?
- Presented by: Hayley Sproull
- Starring: Vaughan Smith; Urzila Carlson
- Country of origin: New Zealand
- Original language: English
- No. of seasons: 4
- No. of episodes: 86

Production
- Production locations: TVNZ, 100 Victoria Street West, Auckland, New Zealand
- Running time: 60 minutes (including adverts)

Original release
- Network: TVNZ 2
- Release: 24 July 2019 – present

Have You Been Paying Attention? (abbreviated on social media as HYBPA? NZ and stylised on-screen in sentence case) is a New Zealand panel show on TVNZ 2, based on the original Australian series Have You Been Paying Attention? The series is a mix of news and comedy in which host Hayley Sproull quizzes five guests – permanent panelists Urzila Carlson and Vaughan Smith and three others – on the week's top news stories.

== Format ==
The series sees the host ask guests a range of news-related questions. In turn, guests give humorous or satirical answers. Correct answers are awarded points. In addition to questions regarding the previous week's events, the contestants are also quizzed in various other games. Some segments are partly presented by guest hosts as part of cross-promotion.

While the show declares a winner each episode, there is no prize, and the show records segments declaring each panelist a winner in case the edit changes the scores given in the final broadcast show. Speaking about the Australian version of HYBPA, on which she also appears, Carlson said "it's for laughs not really to win the game, although I like to win!"

== History ==
The series debuted on 24 July 2019. On 23 and 30 October, repeat episodes were aired, as the TVNZ studio had been evacuated due to the New Zealand International Convention Centre fire nearby.

The second season began in February 2020, but production was put on hold in March as a result of the COVID-19 pandemic. The series resumed on 29 April via remote work and videotelephony by all of the comedians. Filming returned to the studio on 20 May, after lockdown restrictions were reduced.

The third series debuted on 16 February 2021. On 20 August, a repeat episode was aired due to New Zealand returning to lockdown. The series resumed on 27 August using video conferencing.

The fourth series debuted on 5 August 2022, and on 21 October 2022, they announced on social media they were taking a break.

== Episodes ==
| Season | Episodes | Originally aired | |
| Season | Episodes | First aired | Last aired |
|---|---|---|---|
| **1** | 18 | 24 July 2019 | 18 December 2019 |
| **2** | 15 | 5 February 2020 | 17 June 2020 |
| **3** | 32 | 16 February 2021 | 24 September 2021 |
| **4** | 21 | 4 March 2022 | 14 October 2022 |

Note: Winners are listed in bold

=== Season 1 (2019) ===
| No. overall | No. in season | Guests | Guest Quiz Master(s) | Timeslot | Original release date |
|---|---|---|---|---|---|
| 1 | 1 | **Urzila Carlson**, Tom Sainsbury, Pax Assadi, Brynley Stent, Vaughan Smith | Ben Barrington | 7.30pm Wednesday | 24 July 2019 |
| 2 | 2 | Urzila Carlson, Eli Matthewson, Te Radar, Melanie Bracewell, **Vaughan Smith** | Matilda Green | 7.30pm Wednesday | 31 July 2019 |
| 3 | 3 | Urzila Carlson, Ray O'Leary, Matt Heath, Melanie Bracewell, **Vaughan Smith** | Iyia Liu & Edna Swart | 7.30pm Wednesday | 7 August 2019 |
| 4 | 4 | **Urzila Carlson**, Tom Sainsbury, Pax Assadi, Madeleine Sami, Rhys Darby | Matt Chisholm | 7.30pm Wednesday | 14 August 2019 |
| 5 | 5 | Urzila Carlson, Kimberley Crossman, Nick Rado, Melanie Bracewell, **Vaughan Smith** | Anika Moa | 7.30pm Wednesday | 21 August 2019 |
| 6 | 6 | Urzila Carlson, James Roque, Lloyd Langford, **Karen O'Leary**, Vaughan Smith | Andy Lynch & Nathan King | 7.30pm Wednesday | 28 August 2019 |
| 7 | 7 | **Urzila Carlson**, Ray O'Leary, Glenn Robbins, Melanie Bracewell, Vaughan Smith | Diamond Langi | 7.30pm Wednesday | 4 September 2019 |
| 8 | 8 | Urzila Carlson, Tom Sainsbury, **Matt Heath**, Bree Tomasel, Vaughan Smith | Matty McLean | 7.30pm Wednesday | 11 September 2019 |
| 9 | 9 | Urzila Carlson, Joseph Moore, Pax Assadi, **Brynley Stent**, Vaughan Smith | Glen Osborne | 7.30pm Wednesday | 18 September 2019 |
| 10 | 10 | Urzila Carlson, **Chris Parker**, Jesse Griffin, Madeleine Sami, Vaughan Smith | Sam Wallace | 7.30pm Wednesday | 25 September 2019 |
| 11 | 11 | Urzila Carlson, Chris Parker, Glenn Robbins, Melanie Bracewell, **Vaughan Smith** | Mike Minogue (as Officer Minogue) & Karen O'Leary (as Officer O'Leary) | 7.30pm Wednesday | 16 October 2019 |
| 12 | 12 | Urzila Carlson, Pax Assadi, Rove McManus, **Brynley Stent**, Vaughan Smith | Sue Fleischl | 7.30pm Wednesday | 6 November 2019 |
| 13 | 13 | Urzila Carlson, Tom Sainsbury, Jarred Christmas, Bree Tomasel, **Vaughan Smith** | Jon Toogood, Chris Mac | 7.30pm Wednesday | 13 November 2019 |
| 14 | 14 | Urzila Carlson, Ray O'Leary, **Lloyd Langford**, Melanie Bracewell, Vaughan Smith | Claire Chitham | 7.30pm Wednesday | 20 November 2019 |
| 15 | 15 | Urzila Carlson, Chris Parker, Andy Lee, Karen O'Leary, **Vaughan Smith** | Clarke Gayford, Liam Malone | 7.30pm Wednesday | 27 November 2019 |
| 16 | 16 | Urzila Carlson, Nick Rado, Pax Assadi, Kura Forrester, **Vaughan Smith** | Ladi6, Corey Webster | 7.30pm Wednesday | 4 December 2019 |
| 17 | 17 | Urzila Carlson, **Eli Matthewson**, Leigh Hart, Madeleine Sami, Vaughan Smith | David Seymour | 7.30pm Wednesday | 11 December 2019 |
| 18 | 18 | Urzila Carlson, Ray O'Leary, Pax Assadi, Melanie Bracewell, **Vaughan Smith** | Michael Galvin, Jenny-May Clarkson | 7.30pm Wednesday | 18 December 2019 |

=== Season 2 (2020) ===
| No. overall | No. in season | Guests | Guest Quiz Master(s) | Timeslot | Original release date |
|---|---|---|---|---|---|
| 19 | 1 | Urzila Carlson, Tom Sainsbury, Ben Hurley, Melanie Bracewell, Vaughan Smith | Lesina Nakhid-Schuster, Lily McManus, two others (TBA) | 8.30pm Wednesday | 5 February 2020 |
| 20 | 2 | Urzila Carlson, Ray O'Leary, Lloyd Langford, Madeleine Sami, Vaughan Smith | Erin Simpson, Zac Franich | 8.30pm Wednesday | 12 February 2020 |
| 21 | 3 | Urzila Carlson, Pax Assadi, Lloyd Langford, Anika Moa, Vaughan Smith | Shavaughn Ruakere, Uli Latukefu | 7.30pm Wednesday | 19 February 2020 |
| 22 | 4 | **Urzila Carlson**, Guy Montgomery, Ben Hurley, Melanie Bracewell, Vaughan Smith | Charlotte Crosby | 7.30pm Wednesday | 26 February 2020 |
| 23 | 5 | **Urzila Carlson**, Paul Ego, Jesse Griffin, Melanie Bracewell, Vaughan Smith | Steve Masters | 7.30pm Wednesday | 4 March 2020 |
| 24 | 6 | Urzila Carlson, **Rove McManus**, Pax Assadi, Laura Daniel, Vaughan Smith | Nicole Whippy, Kelvin Cruickshank | 7.30pm Wednesday | 11 March 2020 |
| 25 | 7 | **Urzila Carlson**, Chris Parker, Cori Gonzalez-Macuer, Bree Tomasel, Vaughan Smith | Logan Carr, Aaron McNabb | 7.30pm Wednesday | 18 March 2020 |
| 26 | 8 | **Urzila Carlson**, Tom Sainsbury, Paul Ego, Melanie Bracewell, Vaughan Smith | Bree Tomasel, Joseph Parker | 8.30pm Wednesday | 29 April 2020 |
| 27 | 9 | **Urzila Carlson**, Ray O'Leary, Chris Parker, Madeleine Sami, Vaughan Smith | Guy Williams | 8.30pm Wednesday | 6 May 2020 |
| 28 | 10 | Urzila Carlson, **Eli Matthewson**, Pax Assadi, Laura Daniel, Vaughan Smith | Paula Bennett | 8.30pm Wednesday | 13 May 2020 |
| 29 | 11 | Urzila Carlson, Jamaine Ross, Ben Hurley, Melanie Bracewell, **Vaughan Smith** | Rhys Darby | 8.30pm Wednesday | 20 May 2020 |
| 30 | 12 | **Urzila Carlson**, Chris Parker, Guy Williams, Justine Smith, Vaughan Smith | Jono Pryor & Ben Boyce | 8.30pm Wednesday | 27 May 2020 |
| 31 | 13 | **Urzila Carlson**, Guy Montgomery, Josh Thomson, Melanie Bracewell, Vaughan Smith | Iyia Liu & Edna Swart, Tom Robinson | 8.30pm Wednesday | 3 June 2020 |
| 32 | 14 | Urzila Carlson, Ben Hurley, Joseph Moore, **Madeleine Sami**, Vaughan Smith | Chlöe Swarbrick | 8.30pm Wednesday | 10 June 2020 |
| 33 | 15 | Urzila Carlson, Ray O'Leary, Brynley Stent, Mike Minogue, **Vaughan Smith** | Simon Bridges | 8.30pm Wednesday | 17 June 2020 |

=== Season 3 (2021) ===
| No. overall | No. in season | Guests | Guest Quiz Master(s) | Timeslot | Original release date |
|---|---|---|---|---|---|
| 34 | 1 | **Urzila Carlson**, Ray O'Leary, Ben Hurley, Madeleine Sami, Vaughan Smith | Sam Bunkall, Siouxsie Wiles | 8.30pm Tuesday | 16 February 2021 |
| 35 | 2 | Urzila Carlson, Pax Assadi, Paul Ego, Melanie Bracewell, **Vaughan Smith** | Paul Patterson, Jason Hoyte & Mike Minogue | 8.30pm Tuesday | 23 February 2021 |
| 36 | 3 | Urzila Carlson, **Guy Montgomery**, Aaron Chen, Justine Smith, Vaughan Smith | Lexie Brown & Hamish Boyt | 9pm Tuesday | 2 March 2021 |
| 37 | 4 | Urzila Carlson, Ben Hurley, Angella Dravid, Tom Sainsbury, **Vaughan Smith** | Ray Letoa & Tulima Nonu | 8.30pm Tuesday | 9 March 2021 |
| 38 | 5 | Urzila Carlson, Melanie Bracewell, **Pax Assadi**, James Nokise, Vaughan Smith | Francis Tipene & Kaiora Tipene, Jimmy Neesham | 8.30pm Tuesday | 16 March 2021 |
| 39 | 6 | **Urzila Carlson**, Josh Thompson, Ray O'Leary, Laura Daniel, Vaughan Smith | Devaney Davis, Jesse Tuke | 8.30pm Tuesday | 23 March 2021 |
| 40 | 7 | Urzila Carlson, Eli Matthewson, Jesse Griffin, **Madeleine Sami**, Vaughan Smith | Karen Walker, Angus Ta'avao | 8.30pm Tuesday | 30 March 2021 |
| 41 | 8 | Laura Daniel, Tom Sainsbury, Ben Hurley, Brynley Stent, **Vaughan Smith** | Laura Davis, Candy Lee | 8.30pm Tuesday | 6 April 2021 |
| 42 | 9 | Justine Smith, **Guy Montgomery**, Chris Parker, Angella Dravid, Vaughan Smith | JJ Fong & Perlina Lau, Jane Watson | 8.30pm Tuesday | 13 April 2021 |
| 43 | 10 | Urzila Carlson, Ray O'Leary, Pax Assadi, **Karen O'Leary**, Vaughan Smith | Eds Eramiha, Lynda Topp & Jools Topp | 8.30pm Tuesday | 20 April 2021 |
| 44 | 11 | Urzila Carlson, Ben Hurley, James Roque, Guy Montgomery, **Laura Daniel** | Tofiga Fepulea'i, Ben Elton | 8.30pm Tuesday | 27 April 2021 |
| 45 | 12 | Cal Wilson, Rhys Mathewson, Pax Assadi, **Madeleine Sami**, Vaughan Smith | Erika Takacs & Megan Alatini, Billy Stairmand | 8.30pm Tuesday | 4 May 2021 |
| 46 | 13 | Urzila Carlson, **Chris Parker**, Ben Hurley, Angella Dravid, Vaughan Smith | Sam Thomson & Shaan Singh, Ganesh Raj | 8.30pm Tuesday | 11 May 2021 |
| 47 | 14 | **Urzila Carlson**, Guy Montgomery, Bree Tomasel, Joe Daymond, Vaughan Smith | Cassie Roma, Mike King | 8.30pm Tuesday | 18 May 2021 |
| 48 | 15 | Urzila Carlson, Pax Assadi, Ray O'Leary, Livi Reihana, **Vaughan Smith** | Tami Neilson, Sarah Walker | 8.30pm Tuesday | 25 May 2021 |
| 49 | 16 | Justine Smith, Rhys Mathewson, James Nokise, Melanie Bracewell, **Vaughan Smith** | Fasitua Amosa, Michaela Blyde | 8.30pm Tuesday | 1 June 2021 |
| 50 | 17 | **Urzila Carlson**, Ray O'Leary, Pax Assadi, Kura Forrester, Vaughan Smith | Anita Wigl'it, Hayley Holt | 8.30pm Tuesday | 8 June 2021 |
| 51 | 18 | **Laura Daniel**, Ray O'Leary, Josh Thomson, Mel Bracewell, Vaughan Smith | Jodie Rimmer, Jack Goodhue | 8.30pm Friday | 2 July 2021 |
| 52 | 19 | Alice Snedden, **James Roque**, Ben Hurley, Angella Dravid, Vaughan Smith | Kita Mean, Troy Kingi | 8.30pm Friday | 9 July 2021 |
| 53 | 20 | **Laura Daniel**, Tom Sainsbury, Josh Thompson, Liv McKenzie, Rhys Mathewson | Jordan Luck, Chris Bishop | 8.30pm Friday | 16 July 2021 |
| 54 | 21 | Justine Smith, Joe Daymond, Eli Matthewson, **Madeleine Sami**, Vaughan Smith | Eric Murray, Barbara Kendall, Paul Williams & David Correos | 8.30pm Friday | 23 July 2021 |
| 55 | 22 | **Urzila Carlson**, Ray O'Leary, Josh Thomson, Laura Daniel, Vaughan Smith | Paula Bennett, Sulu Fitzpatrick | 8.30pm Friday | 13 August 2021 |
| 56 | 23 | Urzila Carlson, **Chris Parker**, Guy Montgomery, Madeleine Sami, Vaughan Smith | Kings, Ruby Tui | 8.30pm Friday | 27 August 2021 |
| 57 | 24 | Urzila Carlson, Pax Assadi, Rhys Mathewson, Laura Daniel, **Vaughan Smith** | Mark & Cathy Fren, Jono Pryor & Ben Boyce | 8.30pm Friday | 3 September 2021 |
| 58 | 25 | Urzila Carlson, Ray O'Leary, Josh Thomson, Brynley Stent, **Vaughan Smith** | John Pearce, Buck Shelford | 8.30pm Friday | 10 September 2021 |
| 59 | 26 | **Urzila Carlson**, Pax Assadi, Madeleine Sami, Chris Parker, Vaughan Smith | Tiki Taane, Maia Wilson | 8.30pm Friday | 17 September 2021 |
| 60 | 27 | Urzila Carlson, Eli Matthewson, **Guy Montgomery**, Angella Dravid, Vaughan Smith | Rena Owen, Shaun Johnson | 7.30pm Friday | 24 September 2021 |
| 61 | 28 | **Urzila Carlson**, James Roque, Josh Thomson, Liv McKenzie, Vaughan Smith | Edna Swart, Tom Mackintosh | 8.30pm Friday | 1 October 2021 |
| 62 | 29 | Urzila Carlson, Pax Assadi, Eli Matthewson, Laura Daniel, **Vaughan Smith** | Richie Barnett, Sue Fleischl | 8.30pm Friday | 8 October 2021 |
| 63 | 30 | Urzila Carlson, Ray O'Leary, Guy Montgomery, **Madeleine Sami**, Vaughan Smith | Vinnie Bennett, Hayden Paddon | 8.30pm Friday | 15 October 2021 |
| 64 | 31 | Urzila Carlson, Chris Parker, Josh Thomson, **Bree Tomasel**, Vaughan Smith | Clarke Gayford, Hollie Smith | 8.30pm Friday | 22 October 2021 |
| 65 | 32 | **Urzila Carlson**, Tom Sainsbury, Pax Assadi, Laura Daniel, Vaughan Smith | Chris Parker, Lisa Carrington, Melissa Leong | 7:30pm Friday | 17 December 2021 |
Note: 2021 Christmas Special

=== Season 4 (2022) ===
| No. overall | No. in season | Guests | Guest Quiz Master(s) | Timeslot | Original release date |
|---|---|---|---|---|---|
| 66 | 1 | Urzila Carlson, **Pax Assadi**, Paul Ego, Melanie Bracewell, Vaughan Smith | Jono & Victoria Fren, Katey Martin | 8:30pm Friday | 4 March 2022 |
| 67 | 2 | Urzila Carlson, James Roque, Eli Matthewson, Brynley Stent, **Vaughan Smith** | Lily McManus, Junior Fa | 8:30pm Friday | 11 March 2022 |
| 68 | 3 | Urzila Carlson, Chris Parker, Josh Thomson, Laura Daniel, Vaughan Smith | Clint Slight Roberts, Gina Crampton | 8:30pm Friday | 18 March 2022 |
| 69 | 4 | Urzila Carlson, Guy Montgomery, Josh Thomson, Liv McKenzie, Vaughan Smith | Brooke van Velden, Angus Taʻavao | 8:30pm Friday | 25 March 2022 |
| 70 | 5 | Laura Daniel, Ray O'Leary, Paul Ego, Janaye Henry, Vaughan Smith | Tova O'Brien, Frank Bunce, Jade Kevin Foster | 8:30pm Friday | 1 April 2022 |
| 71 | 6 | Justine Smith, Tom Sainsbury, Ben Hurley, Karen O'Leary, Vaughan Smith | Kimberley Crossman | 8:30pm Friday | 8 April 2022 |
| 72 | 7 | Justine Smith, Ray O'Leary, Rhys Mathewson, Liv McKenzie, Vaughan Smith | Brooke Howard-Smith | 8:30pm Friday | 22 April 2022 |
| 73 | 8 | Kimberley Crossman, Eli Mathewson, Ben Hurley, Angella Dravid, Vaughan Smith | Robert Loe | 8:30pm Friday | 29 April 2022 |
| 74 | 9 | Justine Smith, Ray O'Leary, Dai Henwood, Courtney Dawson, Vaughan Smith | TBA | 8:30pm Friday | 6 May 2022 |
| 75 | 10 | Urzila Carlson, Chris Parker, Josh Thomson, Janaye Henry, Vaughan Smith | Grant Lobban, Huriana Manuel | 8:30pm Friday | 13 May 2022 |
| 76 | 11 | Urzila Carlson, Ray O'Leary, Josh Thomson, Madeleine Sami, Rhys Mathewson | Tyler & Brandford Fisher | 8:30pm Friday | 5 August 2022 |
| 77 | 12 | Urzila Carlson, Pax Assadi, Dai Henwood, Liv McKenzie, Vaughn Smith | TBA | 8:30pm Friday | 12 August 2022 |
| 78 | 13 | Urzila Carlson, Pax Assadi, Paul Ego, Courtney Dawson, Vaughan Smith | TBA | 8:30pm Friday | 19 August 2022 |
| 79 | 14 | Justine Smith, Rhys Mathewson, Josh Thomson, Courtney Dawson, Vaughan Smith | TBA | 8:30pm Friday | 26 August 2022 |
Note: Pax Assadi replaced Hayley Sproull as guest host.
| 80 | 15 | Urzila Carlson, Ray O'Leary, Guy Montgomery, Madeleine Sami, Vaughan Smith | Anna Willcox-Silfverberg | 8:30pm Friday | 2 September 2022 |
| 81 | 16 | Kim Crossman, Pax Assadi, Dai Henwood, Melanie Bracewell, Vaughan Smith | Dylan Schmidt, Paige | 8:30pm Friday | 9 September 2022 |
| 82 | 17 | Angella Dravid, Rhys Mathewson, Cori Gonzalez-Macuer, Janaye Henry, Vaughan Smith | Tom Robinson, Dorian Calleja, Kevin He & Michael Teng | 8:35pm Friday | 16 September 2022 |
| 83 | 18 | Urzila Carlson, Ray O'Leary, Josh Thomson, Courtney Dawson, Vaughan Smith | Melodie Robinson, Julie Goodwin | 8:30pm Friday | 23 September 2022 |
| 84 | 19 | Urzila Carlson, James Mustapic, Laura Daniel, Courtney Dawson, Vaughan Smith | Jazz Thornton | 8:30pm Friday | 30 September 2022 |
| 85 | 20 | Urzila Carlson, Cori Gonzalez-Macuer, Josh Thomson, Liv McKenzie, Vaughan Smith | Carlos Ulberg | 9:10pm Friday | 7 October 2022 |
| 86 | 21 | Urzila Carlson, Kim Crossman, Ray O'Leary, Courtney Dawson, Vaughan Smith | Lauren Jenner | 8:30pm Friday | 14 October 2022 |

== Cast ==
=== Hosts ===
- Hayley Sproull
- Pax Assadi (1 episode)

=== Guests ===
| Contestant | Appearances | Show wins |
|---|---|---|
| Vaughan Smith | 57 | 17 |
| Urzila Carlson | 52 | 16 |
| Pax Assadi | 17 | 1 |
| Melanie Bracewell | 17 | 0 |
| Ray O'Leary | 15 | 0 |
| Madeleine Sami | 12 | 4 |
| Chris Parker | 10 | 3 |
| Ben Hurley | 10 | 0 |
| Laura Daniel | 9 | 3 |
| Eli Matthewson | 9 | 2 |
| Tom Sainsbury | 9 | 0 |
| Guy Montgomery | 8 | 3 |
| Brynley Stent | 7 | 2 |
| Liv McKenzie | 6 | 0 |
| Josh Thomson | 6 | 0 |
| Justine Smith | 5 | 0 |
| Angella Dravid | 5 | 0 |
| Lloyd Langford | 4 | 1 |
| Bree Tomasel | 4 | 0 |
| Rhys Mathewson | 4 | 0 |
| Karen O'Leary | 3 | 2 |
| James Roque | 3 | 1 |
| Jesse Griffin | 3 | 0 |
| Paul Ego | 3 | 0 |
| Matt Heath | 2 | 1 |
| Rove McManus | 2 | 1 |
| Glenn Robbins | 2 | 0 |
| Joseph Moore | 2 | 0 |
| Nick Rado | 2 | 0 |
| James Nokise | 2 | 0 |
| Kura Forrester | 2 | 0 |
| Joe Daymond | 2 | 0 |
| Aaron Chen | 1 | 0 |
| Andy Lee | 1 | 0 |
| Anika Moa | 1 | 0 |
| Cal Wilson | 1 | 0 |
| Cori Gonzalez-Macuer | 1 | 0 |
| Guy Williams | 1 | 0 |
| Jamaine Ross | 1 | 0 |
| Jarred Christmas | 1 | 0 |
| Kimberley Crossman | 1 | 0 |
| Leigh Hart | 1 | 0 |
| Mike Minogue | 1 | 0 |
| Rhys Darby | 1 | 0 |
| Te Radar | 1 | 0 |
| Livi Reihana | 1 | 0 |
| Alice Snedden | 1 | 0 |

== Controversy ==
The 20 May 2020 episode was pulled from TVNZ OnDemand over a segment where the panellist Urzila Carlson was asked if "Hipango" was the name of a member of parliament or a brand of yoghurt. Whanganui MP Harete Hipango said that the segment insulted her family, saying that "my adult children who carry my whanau name Hipango have paid attention and like their mother are not amused at the poor taste humour of a Sth Africa NZ kiwi (sic) so-called 'comedienne' bastardising our family/whanau name on national television in order to generate a few half-hearted laughs". TVNZ apologised, and removed the episode from OnDemand while it spoke with Hipango.
