= The Great Kiwi Bake Off =

New Zealand television show

- Genre: Baking; Reality
- Presented by: Hayley Sproull; Pax Assadi; Madeleine Sami (former)
- Judges: Peter Gordon; Jordan Rondel; Dean Brettschneider (former); Sue Fleischl (former)
- Theme music composer: Tom Howe
- Country of origin: New Zealand
- Original language: English
- No. of seasons: 5
- No. of episodes: 43

Production
- Executive producers: Emma White; Greg Heathcote
- Production locations: The Kelliher Estate, Puketutu Island, Auckland (2018–2019); Parihoa Farm, Muriwai, Auckland (2021–present)
- Running time: 60–90 minutes
- Production company: Warner Bros. International Television Production

Original release
- Network: TVNZ 2 (2018–2019); TVNZ 1 (2021–)
- Release: 16 October 2018 – present

Related
- The Great British Bake Off

The Great Kiwi Bake Off is a New Zealand television baking competition based on The Great British Bake Off in which 12 amateur bakers compete in a series of baking challenges. The show's first episode was aired on 16 October 2018 on TVNZ 2. The show is hosted by Hayley Sproull and Madeleine Sami, with judges Dean Brettschneider and Sue Fleischl, and guest judges. The show, like other spinoffs of The Great British Bake Off, uses a similar style, format, and opening theme song to the British series. Like the British series, the show is followed by a recap special called An Extra Slice, hosted by Chris Parker, discussing the episode of the week and interviewing contestants who have been eliminated.

== Format ==
The programme operates on a weekly elimination process to find the best all-round baker from the contestants who are all amateurs, where in each episode the bakers are tasked with different challenges: a signature bake, a technical bake, and a showstopper. The first season only included two of the three challenges with the exception of the finale. All three challenges were included during the second season. The bakes are critically examined by the judges who will then choose a "Star Baker" and a baker that is eliminated from the competition.

- Signature Challenge: This challenge allows the amateur bakers to show off their tried-and-tested recipes.
- Technical Challenge: This challenge shows who can follow minimal instructions and who also has the technical knowledge and experience to produce a finished product. The bakers are all given the same recipe and are not told the challenge beforehand. The finished product is ranked from worst to best with the judges not knowing who produced which bake.
- Showstopper Challenge: This challenge allows the bakers to show off their skills and talent with the judges looking for a bake with both a professional appearance and great taste.

== Season overview ==
Season	Contestants	Episodes	Judges	Presented by	Location	Channel	Premiere	Finale	Winner	Runners-up
1	12	10	Dean Brettschneider; Sue Fleischl	Hayley Sproull; Madeleine Sami	The Kelliher Estate, Puketutu Island, Auckland	TVNZ 2	16 October 2018	18 December 2018	Annabel Coulter	Hannah Ward; Jeff Poole; Stacey Johnsen
2	10	8	Dean Brettschneider; Sue Fleischl	Hayley Sproull; Madeleine Sami	The Kelliher Estate, Puketutu Island, Auckland	TVNZ 2	3 November 2019	22 December 2019	Trevor Hall	Heather Andrew; Naomi Toilalo
Celebrity Special	6	1	Dean Brettschneider; Sue Fleischl	Hayley Sproull; Madeleine Sami	The Kelliher Estate, Puketutu Island, Auckland	TVNZ 2	23 December 2019		Jackie van Beek	N/A
3	10	9	Dean Brettschneider; Sue Fleischl	Hayley Sproull; Madeleine Sami	Parihoa Farm, Muriwai, Auckland	TVNZ 1	14 October 2021	9 December 2021	Alby Hailes	Courtnay Fafeita; Jasmin Hohaia
Celebrity Special 2	6	1	Dean Brettschneider; Sue Fleischl	Hayley Sproull; Madeleine Sami	Parihoa Farm, Muriwai, Auckland	TVNZ 1	16 December 2021		Josh Thomson	N/A
4	10	8	Peter Gordon; Jordan Rondel	Hayley Sproull; Pax Assadi	Parihoa Farm, Muriwai, Auckland	TVNZ 1	25 August 2022	13 October 2022	Brooke Walker	Jonathan Willows; Victoria Hume
Celebrity Special 3	6	1	Peter Gordon; Jordan Rondel	Hayley Sproull; Pax Assadi	Parihoa Farm, Muriwai, Auckland	TVNZ 1	20 October 2022		Bree Tomasel	N/A
Celebrity Special 4	6	1	Peter Gordon; Jordan Rondel	Hayley Sproull; Pax Assadi	Parihoa Farm, Muriwai, Auckland	TVNZ 1	20 December 2022		David Correos; Siouxsie Wiles	N/A
5	10	8	Peter Gordon; Jordan Rondel	Hayley Sproull; Pax Assadi	Parihoa Farm, Muriwai, Auckland	TVNZ 1	25 January 2024	14 March 2024	Anna Wainwright	Devoney Scarfe; Sally Eagle

=== Season 1 (2018) ===
This season premiered on 16 October 2018 and featured four bakers in the finale instead of the typical three. The season was won by Annabel Coulter from Timaru. Runners-up were Stacey Johnsen, Jeff Poole and Hannah Ward.

=== Season 2 (2019) ===
This season premiered on 3 November 2019. The season concluded on 22 December 2019 with Trevor Hall from Havelock North as the season's winner. Runners-up were Heather Andrew and Naomi Toilalo.

=== Celebrity Bake Off NZ (2019) ===
On 23 December 2019, six celebrities competed in the Bake Off tent to win money for the charity of their choice. The special was won by Jackie van Beek.

=== Season 3 (2021) ===
After a COVID-19 pandemic enforced break in 2020, the third edition of The Great Kiwi Bake Off was filmed in 2021 in Muriwai instead of the usual location, South Auckland's Puketutu Island Estate. This season premiered on 14 October 2021 with ten new bakers, and airs weekly, Thursday, at 7:30 PM on TVNZ 1. Sproull, Sami, Brettschneider and Fleischl returned with their respective roles. Mental Health Doctor, Alby Hailes, won the third season with Courtnay Fafeita and Jasmin Hohaia finishing as runner-ups.

=== Celebrity Bake Off NZ (2021) ===
On 16 December 2021, six celebrities competed in the Bake Off tent to win money for the charity of their choice with actors Rebekah Randell and Josh Thomson, comedians Laura Daniel and Justine Smith, politician Simon Bridges, and Francis Tipene of The Casketeers. Josh Thomson won the grand prize of $20,000 and other #30,000 were divided across 6 various charities across Aotearoa.

=== Season 4 (2022) ===
The next season was confirmed and casting was opened on 9 December 2021. This season, Comedian Pax Assadi joined Hayley Sproull as co-host while taking over the judging roles are chef, restaurateur, writer, and food consultant Peter Gordon, alongside Jordan Rondel, an author and co-founder of international cakery The Caker. Marketing Coordinator, Brooke Walker, won the fourth season while Jonathan Willows and Victoria Hume finished as runners-up.

=== Celebrity Bake Off NZ (2022) ===
Celebrity Bake Off NZ (season 3) also known as The Great Kiwi Bake Off Celebrity Treasure Island Special. Celebrity Treasure Island's hosts Matt Chisholm and Bree Tomasel joined 2021's castaways; Candy Lane & Lana Searle and 2022's castaways; Cassie Roma & Courtney Louise competed in the Bake Off tent to win money for the charity of their choice.

=== Season 5 (2024) ===
Casting for Season 5 opened on 9 November 2022. The season was hosted again by Pax Assadi and Hayley Sproull, and was won by Anna Wainwright of Auckland.
