= Vaughan Smith (entertainer) =

New Zealand radio presenter and media personality (born 1982)

- Born: Vaughan Alan Smith; 20 February 1982 (age 44); Morrinsville, Waikato, New Zealand
- Education: New Zealand Broadcasting School
- Occupations: Radio personality; television presenter; voice actor
- Years active: 2002–present
- Employer: ZM
- Television: Have You Been Paying Attention? (NZ)

Vaughan Smith (born 20 February 1982) is a New Zealand radio presenter and media personality, best known for co-hosting the popular morning radio show Fletch, Vaughan & Hayley on ZM. He is also known for his role as a permanent panellist on the New Zealand edition of Have You Been Paying Attention?

== Early life and education ==
Vaughan Alan Smith was born in Morrinsville, New Zealand, to Christine and Ian Smith, on 20 February 1982. He attended Morrinsville Intermediate where he served on the student council alongside future prime minister Jacinda Ardern. Smith studied at Morrinsville College. While at school, Smith worked as a forecourt attendant at Shell and as a relief-milker at local dairy farms.

After completing high school, Smith studied broadcasting at the short-lived Auckland campus of the New Zealand Broadcasting School.

== Career ==
=== 2000s ===
Smith's radio career began in May 2002 at The Generator radio station in Hamilton. He initially worked as an unpaid intern before progressing to a position as an announcer and music director.

In 2004, while still working at The Generator, Smith entered a "Quit your day job" contest run by The Edge radio station. The prize was a position as a night announcer at station. However, due to staffing issues, the position was changed mid-contest to announcer on the afternoon drive show. After completing a number of radio stunts, Smith was eventually selected as the winner. The next week after winning, he joined existing presenters Carl "Fletch" Fletcher and Chang Hung to form the Fletch, Vaughan & Chang Drive Show.

In November 2009, completed the Auckland Marathon along with fellow The Edge presenters Jay-Jay Feeney, Dom Harvey, and Fletcher.

=== 2010s ===
In 2013, Smith launched a successful campaign to get Toto's 1982 hit " Africa" to No. 1 on the New Zealand iTunes charts.

In April 2014, Smith, Fletcher and Megan Papas moved to the ZM network. Their new show, The Fletch, Vaughan & Megan Show airs in the prime breakfast radio time slot.

In 2016, Smith starred in comedic miniseries The Critic and the Pig with comedian Josh Thomson on WatchMe. Smith and Thompson visit Auckland restaurants and rate them out of a possible five trotters.

In 2018, Smith presented online series MediaScrap on WatchMe. In the show, Smith comedically reviews clips collected from New Zealand television and online.

Since 2019, Smith has been a permanent panellist on the TVNZ 2 panel show Have You Been Paying Attention?.

=== 2020s ===
In 2021, Megan Papas left the show and was replaced by Hayley Sproull, leading to the rebranding of the program as Fletch, Vaughan & Hayley. The new trio continued the show's success, maintaining high listener ratings and a strong social media presence.

In 2024, Smith celebrated 20 years on air with Fletcher

== Personal life ==
Smith lives on a hobby farm in West Auckland with his two daughters.

It is rumored he and his wife split in 2025.

== Awards and nominations ==
| Year | Association | Category | Nominated work | Result | Ref |
|---|---|---|---|---|---|
| 2006 | New Zealand Radio Awards | Best Non-Breakfast Host or Hosts – Metropolitan | Fletch, Vaughan & Chang Drive Show – The Edge Network | Finalist | |
| 2009 | New Zealand Radio Awards | Best Music Non-Breakfast Host or Hosts – Metropolitan | Fletch & Vaughan – The Edge Network | Finalist | |
| 2011 | New Zealand Radio Awards | Best Music Non-Breakfast Host or Hosts – Metropolitan | Fletch & Vaughan – The Edge Network | Finalist | |
| 2012 | New Zealand Radio Awards | Best Music Non-Breakfast Host or Hosts – Metropolitan | The Edge Drive with Fletch & Vaughan – The Edge | Finalist | |
| 2013 | New Zealand Radio Awards | Best Music Non-Breakfast Host or Hosts – Metropolitan | Drive with Fletch & Vaughan – The Edge | Won | |
| 2016 | New Zealand Radio Awards | Best Video | April Fools – ZM Network | Finalist | |
| 2016 | New Zealand Radio Awards | Best Single Station Client Campaign | ZM’s Jelly Tipster – ZM Network | Finalist | |
| 2016 | New Zealand Radio Awards | Best Music Breakfast Show – Network | Fletch, Vaughan & Megan – ZM Network | Finalist | |
| 2017 | New Zealand Radio Awards | Best Client Digital/Social Promotion | ZM and Friskies Cat News – ZM Network | Won | |
| 2017 | New Zealand Radio Awards | Best Music Breakfast Show – Network | Fletch, Vaughan & Megan – ZM Network | Finalist | |
| 2017 | New Zealand Radio Awards | Best Network Station Promotion | ZM’s Wedding Unplanners – ZM Network | Finalist | |
| 2018 | New Zealand Radio Awards | Best Music Breakfast Show – Network | ZM's Fletch, Vaughan & Megan – ZM Network | Won | |
| 2018 | New Zealand Radio Awards | Best Video | Lorde-The Babysitter – ZM Network | Won | |
| 2018 | New Zealand Radio Awards | Best Video | The Intern – ZM Network | Finalist | |
| 2018 | New Zealand Radio Awards | The Blackie | Ed Sheeran's Plea for Citizenship – ZM Network | Finalist | |
| 2019 | New Zealand Radio Awards | Best Music Breakfast Show – Network | Fletch, Vaughan & Megan – ZM Network | Won | |
| 2019 | New Zealand Radio Awards | The Blackie | Fletch, Vaughan & Megan's Final Conversion | Won | |
| 2019 | New Zealand Radio Awards | Best Client Promotion/Activation – Single Market | Fletch, Vaughan & Megan's Car Raffle – ZM Network | Won | |
| 2020 | New Zealand Radio Awards | Best Breakfast Show – Music Network | ZM's Fletch, Vaughan & Megan – ZM Network | Won | |
| 2021 | New Zealand Radio Awards | Best Breakfast Show – Music Network | ZM's Fletch, Vaughan & Megan – ZM Network | Won | |
| 2022 | New Zealand Radio Awards | Best Network Team Show | ZM's Fletch, Vaughan & Megan – ZM Network | Won | |
| 2022 | New Zealand Radio Awards | Best Podcast by a Radio Show | ZM's Fletch, Vaughan & Megan – ZM Network | Finalist | |
| 2023 | New Zealand Radio Awards | Best Music Network Breakfast Show | ZM's Fletch, Vaughan & Megan – ZM Network | Won | |
| 2023 | New Zealand Radio Awards | Best Podcast by a Radio Show | ZM's Fletch, Vaughan & Megan – ZM Network | Finalist | |
| 2023 | New Zealand Radio Awards | The Blackie | Hayley's Version: We Didn't Start The Fire – ZM Network | Finalist | |
| 2024 | New Zealand Radio & Podcast Awards | Best Music Network Breakfast Show | ZM's Fletch, Vaughan & Hayley | Won | |
| 2024 | New Zealand Radio & Podcast Awards | The Blackie | ZM's Girl Math | Won | |
| 2024 | New Zealand Radio & Podcast Awards | The Blackie | Callum Presumed Dead | Finalist | |
| 2024 | New Zealand Radio & Podcast Awards | The Blackie | Fletch v Shania | Finalist | |
| 2024 | New Zealand Radio & Podcast Awards | The Blackie | Hayley Meets Jason Momoa | Finalist | |
| 2024 | New Zealand Radio & Podcast Awards | Best Network Station Promotion | ZM's Girl Math | Won | |
| 2024 | New Zealand Radio & Podcast Awards | Best Network Station Promotion | Fletch, Vaughan & Hayley Live | Finalist | |
| 2024 | New Zealand Radio & Podcast Awards | Best Podcast by a Radio Show | ZM's Fletch, Vaughan & Hayley | Finalist | |
