= Caker =

Caker or The Caker may refer to:

- The Caker, a boxed cake mix range founded by Jordan Daphne Rondel
- Caker Folley, an American actress
- Caker Stream, a tributary of the River Wey in south east England
- A derogatory term for an English Canadian
