= The Breaker Upperers =

2018 New Zealand comedy film

- Directed by: Madeleine Sami; Jackie van Beek
- Written by: Madeleine Sami; Jackie van Beek
- Produced by: Carthew Neal; Ainsley Gardiner; Georgina Conder
- Starring: Madeleine Sami; Jackie van Beek
- Cinematography: Ginny Loane
- Edited by: Tom Eagles
- Production company: Piki Films
- Distributed by: Madman Entertainment
- Release dates: 10 March 2018 (South by Southwest); 3 May 2018
- Running time: 80 minutes
- Country: New Zealand
- Language: English
- Box office: $3,410,666 (NZD)

The Breaker Upperers is a New Zealand romantic-comedy film written, directed by, and starring Madeleine Sami and Jackie van Beek. It was executive produced by Taika Waititi. The film is about two women cynical about love, who run an agency that helps break couples up. The film was released in New Zealand on 3 May 2018 and internationally on Netflix (excluding New Zealand and Australia) on 15 February 2019. Upon release, the film received positive reviews and was a box office hit in New Zealand.

== Plot ==
Jen and Mel run "The Breaker Upperers", an Auckland agency for people who need help breaking up with their partners. Using unorthodox means, such as impersonating police officers to inform a woman, Anna, that her husband has died and his body has gone missing, while in reality, he is hiding in their car.

The two women have been friends since their twenties, after finding out that they shared a boyfriend, Joe. Although Mel has moved on, Jen is still obsessed with Joe, who has moved back to town with his wife and children.

Mel and Jordan, a teenaged client afraid to break up with his fearsome girlfriend, Sepa, are mutually attracted, much to Jen's concern. The three meet with Sepa and her gang to break up the couple. Sepa ends up punching Jen in the face, and afterward, Mel and Jordan begin dating.

One day, Jen and Mel meet Anna again. She still believes her husband's body is missing and that they are police officers. Anna and Mel soon become friends, having many shared interests. Jen is annoyed and feels left out. Anna begs them to reveal her husband's file.

Jen and Mel, in their police costumes, continue the charade in the local police station. They are exposed when an officer mistakes them for strippers, requesting a lap dance. Afterwards, a shocked Anna storms out. Mel apologises, explaining that Anna's husband had hired them. Furious, she won't forgive them, declaring that what they do is wrong.

Taking Anna's words to heart, Mel considers quitting, infuriating Jen, who doesn't find fault with what they are doing. Jen blames Mel for causing her breakup with Joe many years ago. Despite being reminded that Joe had hurt both of them, Jen cuts Mel from her life and the agency.

Meeting Joe for dinner, Jen declares her longtime love for him, stating he is "the one". Initially believing she is joking, Joe laughs at her. He reveals that he had cheated on her with several other women as well. Joe rebuffs Jen by stating that although he was unfaithful in the past, he has since grown up.

Meanwhile, Mel continues to see Jordan. Although he is kind and caring, she realises that due to his age, he remains naive and childish. He is also still in love with Sepa, who had been supportive of his budding rugby career. Jen runs into Mel at the shops, the latter revealing that she is pregnant. She wishes to keep the baby, but is unsure of things with Jordan.

Jen enlists the help of Sepa, who is still in love with Jordan. At the local pub, Jordan is being publicly congratulated on his recent contract to play rugby with the Gold Coast Titans. Mel is also in attendance, and is worried when Jordan announces he will forfeit the contract to stay with her and the baby.

Sepa and her gang arrive with Jen. Declaring her love for Jordan, she apologises for her past aggression, realising her need to change. She and her gang sing for Jordan, while Jen sings to Mel about their friendship. Mel then coaxes Jordan to go back to Sepa and accept the rugby contract, telling him she and the baby will visit him as often as possible. With her support, Jordan reunites with Sepa, and Jen and Mel make amends.

In the end credits, Jen and Mel have rebranded their agency to help clients with "make-ups and break-ups". Anna has forgiven Mel, and they resume their friendship. Jordan has moved to the Gold Coast and is seen happily playing with his infant daughter.

== Cast ==
- Jackie van Beek as Jennifer
- Madeleine Sami as Mel
- James Rolleston as Jordan
- Celia Pacquola as Anna
- Rima Te Wiata as Jen's mother Shona
- Oscar Kightley as client
- Ana Scotney as Sepa
- Cohen Holloway as Joe
- Karen O'Leary as lesbian police officer
- Rose Matafeo as checkout chick
- Jemaine Clement as Tinder date
- Lucy Lawless as client
- Guy Montgomery as waiter

== Reception ==
The film received positive reviews. It holds an 87% on Rotten Tomatoes based on 47 critic reviews, with the consensus that the movie "brings the laughs early and often, thanks to the dry wit — and effervescent chemistry — of writer-director-star duo Jackie van Beek and Madeleine Sami." On Metacritic, the film holds a 76 based on seven reviews, indicating "generally favourable reviews". The film grossed over 1.7 million dollars at the New Zealand box office, becoming the best-selling New Zealand film of 2018, and is one of the top 20 grossing New Zealand films ever.
