= Pax Assadi =

New Zealand comedian

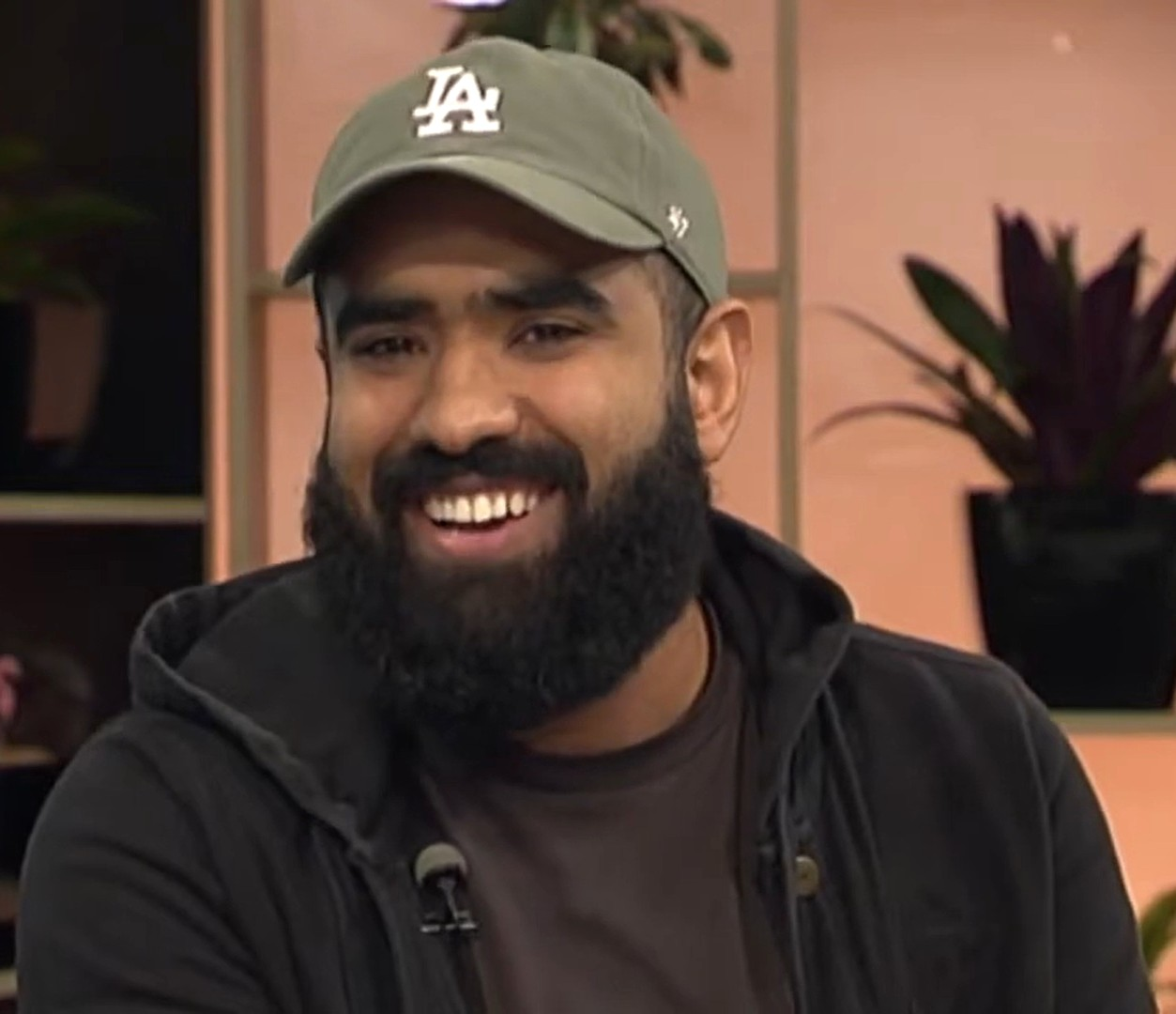
- Assadi in 2018
- Born: 1990 or 1991 (age 35–36); Auckland, New Zealand
- Occupations: Comedian; writer
- Known for: Endangered Species Aotearoa; The Great Kiwi Bake Off; Raised by Refugees; Taskmaster NZ

Comedy career
- Years active: 2012–present
- Medium: Television; stand-up
- Website: www.paxassadi.com

Pax Assadi (born 1990 or 1991) is a New Zealand comedian and writer.

== Early life ==
Assadi was born in 1990 or 1991 in New Zealand to an Iranian father and Pakistani mother. He grew up on the North Shore of Auckland before moving to Hamilton as a teenager, where he worked at his father's vacuum cleaner store. Later the family moved again to Christchurch.

He was inspired by comedians Omid Djalili, Jo Koy, Dylan Moran, and Dave Chappelle.

== Career ==
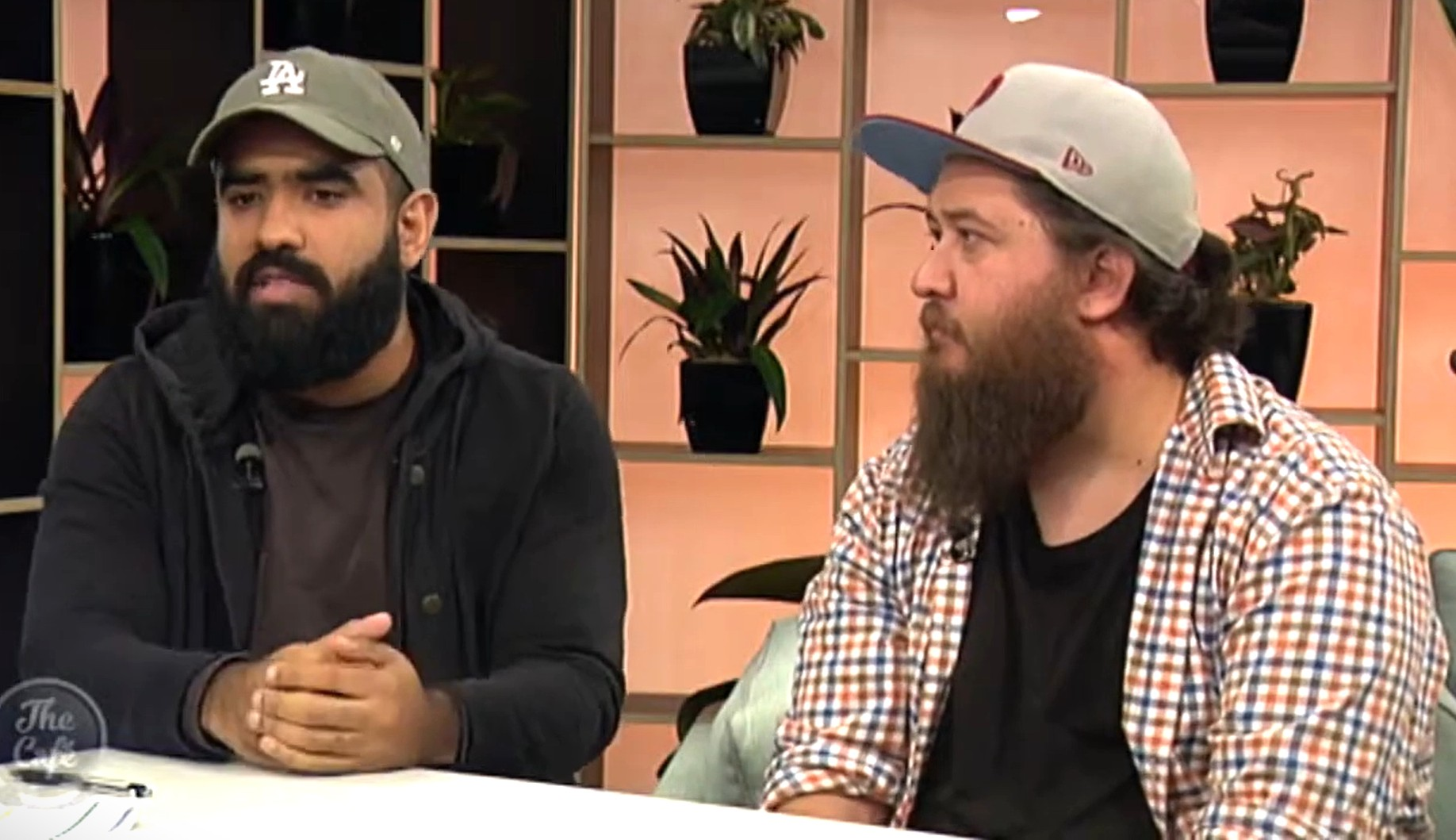
Left to right: Pax Assadi, Jamaine Ross in 2018

Assadi has been performing comedy since 2012. He won the NZ Comedy Guild's Gag of the Year award in 2016. He is part of the comedy trio Frickin Dangerous Bro with James Roque and Jamaine Ross.

In 2016, Assadi was nominated for the Fred Award for his show In Mid-Season Form. Frickin Dangerous Bro were nominated for Humble in 2018.

He was a co-presenter with Nicola Toki on the TVNZ series Endangered Species Aotearoa, and co-hosted The Great Kiwi Bake Off. In 2022 he created and starred in the series Raised by Refugees, which is based on his own childhood. He has also appeared on Word Up, 7 Days, The Project, Crack Up, 60 Seconds, Have You Been Paying Attention?, and Brown Eye. Scripted programmes Assadi has acted on include Jono And Ben, Funny Girls, and Tongue Tied.

In 2025, Assadi appeared on the sixth season of Taskmaster New Zealand. The same year, he declared he was "bored" doing stand-up and wanted to focus on film and television.

Assadi also did commercial voice work for a 2degrees ad campaign.

He is set to star in an upcoming television show alongside Hannah Marshall.

== Personal life ==
Assadi has lived in New Lynn, West Auckland since 2020. He practises Baháʼí, and he and his wife Sholeh, whom he met in Dunedin, have two daughters, Vaha and Lua. He is a fan of NBA basketball team the Utah Jazz.
