= Karen O'Leary =

New Zealand early childhood educator, comedian and television and film actress

- Notable work: Wellington Paranormal
- Website: https://olearious.co.nz/

Karen O'Leary is a New Zealand early childhood educator, comedian and actor. She played Officer O'Leary in Wellington Paranormal, which ran for four seasons from 2018–2022.

== Early life and education ==
O'Leary grew up in Miramar, Wellington and attended Wellington High School and Victoria University. She graduated with a bachelor's degree in education and was an early childhood teacher in Wellington for 21 years. She got involved in acting when casting director Tina Cleary, the parent of one of the children at her workplace, encouraged her to audition for a part in the 2014 film What We Do in the Shadows.

== Career ==
O'Leary played Officer O'Leary in the film What We Do in the Shadows and reprised the role in the spin-off television series Wellington Paranormal.

In 2018, O'Leary appeared in the comedy film The Breaker Upperers.

In 2020, O'Leary presented educational activities on Home Learning TV, a New Zealand television channel dedicated to children learning at home due to school closures during the national lockdown to control the COVID-19 pandemic.

In 2023, O'Leary appeared on the panel show Guy Montgomery's Guy Mont-Spelling Bee. She appeared in series 4 of Taskmaster New Zealand.

== Personal life ==
O'Leary lives in Wellington with her son Melvyn and her partner, Eilish Wilson.

== Filmography ==
=== Television ===
| Year | Title | Role | Notes |
|---|---|---|---|
| 2018 | The Water Cooler | Karen | 3 episodes |
| 2018 | Educators | Police Officer | Episode 1.8 |
| 2018–2022 | Wellington Paranormal | Officer O'Leary | Main role |
| 2020–2023 | The Eggplant | Principal Kathleen Morris | 13 episodes |
| 2023 | Bouncers | Marty; Barbs | 5 episodes |
| 2023 | Far North | Justine | 2 episodes |
| 2023 | Taskmaster New Zealand | Herself | 10 episodes |
| 2024 | Time Bandits | Stomachface | 7 episodes |

=== Film ===
| Year | Title | Role | Notes |
|---|---|---|---|
| 2014 | What We Do in the Shadows | Policewoman | |
| 2016 | Pot Luck | Donna | |
| 2018 | The Breaker Upperers | Police Officer | |
| 2021 | Two Idiots and a Tin Whistle | Guest Judge | |
| 2021 | Millie Lies Low | Campus Security | |
| 2021 | Finding the Lighthouse | Charlie | Short |
| 2022 | Nude Tuesday | Chen | |
| 2023 | Red, White & Brass | Lorraine | |
