= Funny Girls (TV series) =

New Zealand television series

- Genre: Sitcom, sketch comedy
- Starring: Rose Matafeo; Laura Daniel; Jackie van Beek; Kimberley Crossman
- Theme music composer: Johnny Barker
- Country of origin: New Zealand
- Original language: English
- No. of seasons: 3
- No. of episodes: 18 + Special

Production
- Executive producer: John McDonald
- Producer: Bronwynn Bakker
- Cinematography: Drew Sturge
- Editor: Luke Earl

Original release
- Network: Three
- Release: 23 October 2015 – 20 September 2018

Funny Girls is a New Zealand sitcom sketch comedy television series starring Rose Matafeo and Laura Daniel. It premiered on 23 October 2015 on Three and ran until 2018.

== Plot ==
The series follows Laura and Rose as they produce sketches for a fictional comedy series, fielding ideas from their male bosses and their producer Pauline.

== Cast ==
- Rose Matafeo as Rose, a sketch comedy actress
- Laura Daniel as Laura, a sketch comedy actress
- Jackie van Beek as Pauline, Laura and Rose's producer
- Kimberley Crossman
- Teuila Blakely

== Broadcast ==
The show premiered on 23 October 2015 on TV3. In 2016, the series returned for a second season with six episodes. Actress Madeleine Sami made her television directorial debut. Comedy Central was accused of ripping off an episode of the show. In 2018, the Prime Minister of New Zealand Jacinda Ardern appeared a sketch on the show about women's suffrage.

A third season ran in 2018 for six half-hour episodes.
