= Hayley Sproull =

New Zealand comedian, scriptwriter and television show host

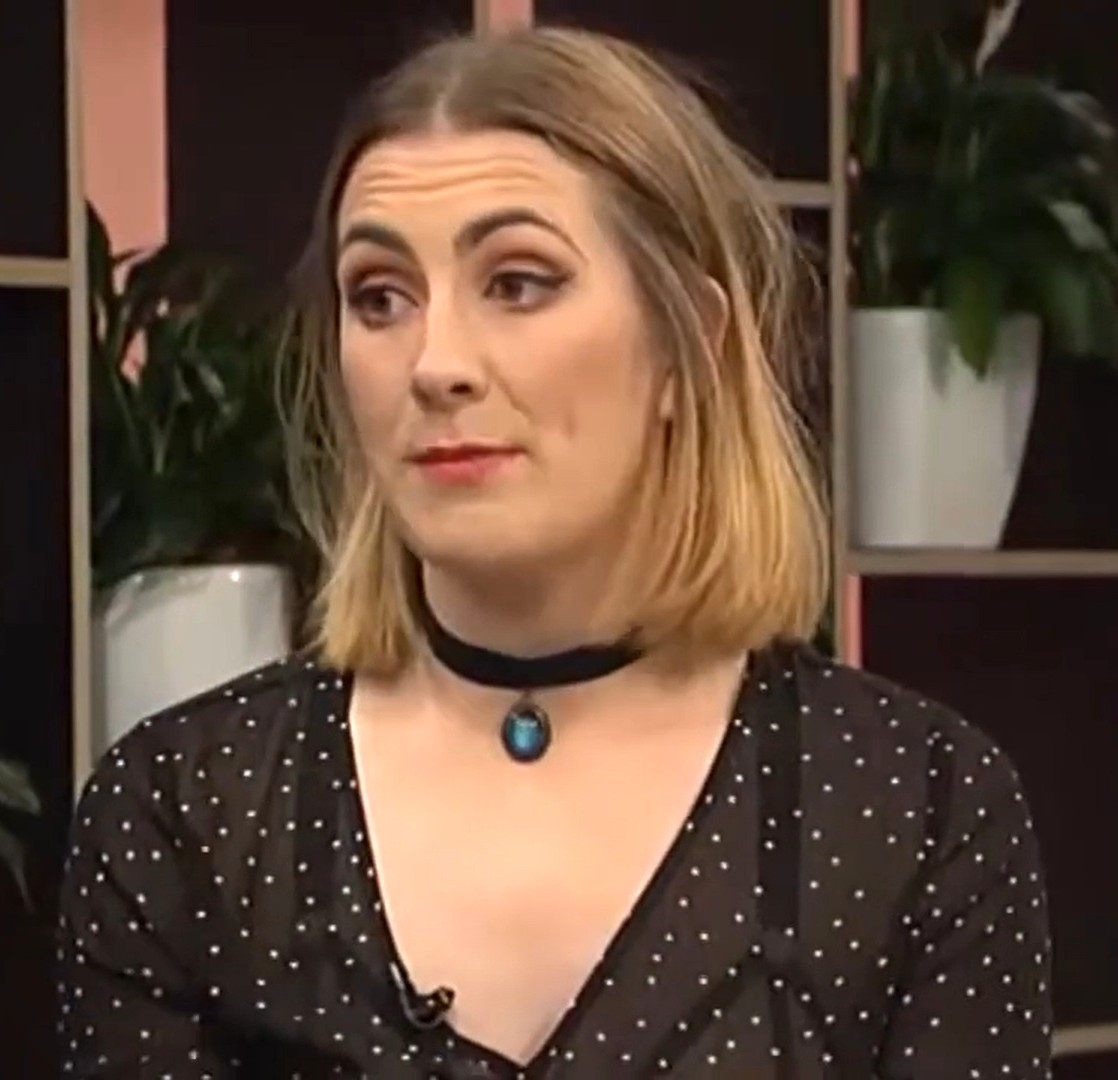
- Sproull in 2016
- Born: Hayley Jayne Sproull; 1989 (age 36–37); New Zealand
- Education: Toi Whakaari (2011)
- Occupations: Comedian; actor; writer
- Known for: The Great Kiwi Bake Off

Comedy career
- Years active: 2012–present
- Medium: Television; stand-up

Hayley Jayne Sproull (born 1989) is a New Zealand comedian, actor, scriptwriter, television show host and radio show co-host. She is the host of The Great Kiwi Bake Off and the New Zealand edition of Have You Been Paying Attention?

== Biography ==
In 2008 Sproull was selected to go to The Globe in London as part of the Young Shakespeare Company. Sproull studied drama at Toi Whakaari in Wellington, New Zealand, graduating in 2011 with a Bachelor of Performing Arts in Acting. She appeared in Three's 2019 sitcom Golden Boy and created and appeared in comedy web series Hayley's Kitchen for TVNZ. She has written for television shows Jono and Ben and 7 Days.

In 2018, she became co-host of The Great Kiwi Bake Off, alongside Madeleine Sami. In 2019, she began hosting Have You Been Paying Attention, a news-based gameshow based on the Australian show of the same name.

As an actor, Sproull has appeared on television shows Funny Girls, Jono and Ben at Ten, Educators, Fresh Eggs, and Golden Boy.

Sproull appeared on the panel show Patriot Brains in 2021.

In 2022, Sproull joined ZM, replacing Megan Papas as the co-host of the weekday breakfast show, alongside long-time radio hosts Carl Fletcher and Vaughan Smith. Sproull spent time on the breakfast show with Smith and Fletcher in 2021, covering Papas' maternity leave. Sproull appeared on the panel shows Guy Montgomery's Guy Mont-Spelling Bee and Taskmaster New Zealand in 2023 and 2024, respectively.

=== Recognition ===
Sproull has won Best Newcomer at the New Zealand International Comedy Festival 2012, the Chapman Tripp Theatre Award for Most Promising Female Newcomer in 2013 and Best Actress and Best Composer at The Wellington Theatre Awards 2017. She was also nominated for a New Zealand Film Award in 2014 for her part in the short film School Night, as well as winning the Peter Vere-Jones Award for Outstanding Performance at the 2007 Shakespeare's Globe Centre NZ University of Otago Sheilah Winn Shakespeare Festival, for her portrayal of the titular character in Richard III.
