= Josh Thomson (actor) =

New Zealand actor and comedian

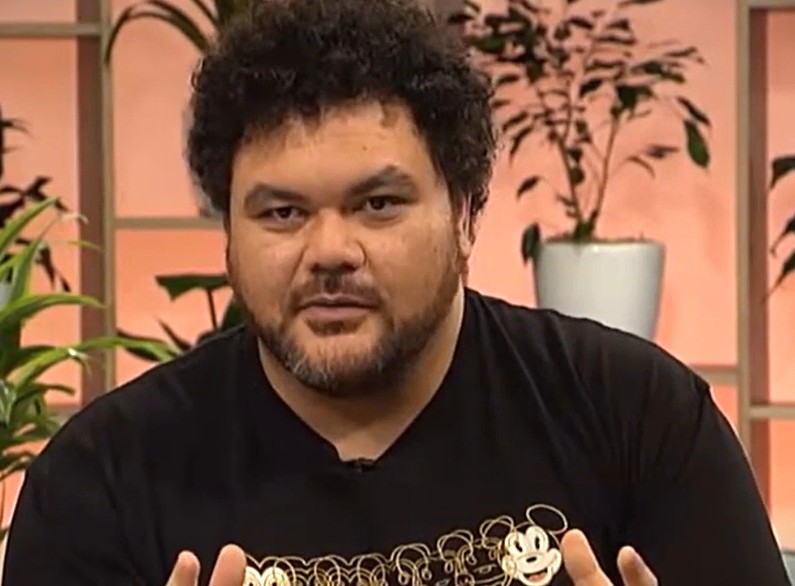
- Thomson in 2017
- Born: 1981 (age 44–45); Timaru, New Zealand
- Occupations: Actor; comedian

Josh Thomson (born 1981 in Timaru, New Zealand) is a New Zealand actor and comedian of Tongan heritage. He is best known for his work as a comedian on 7 Days, Taskmaster New Zealand, Have You Been Paying Attention NZ, Patriot Brains, and as a host on The Project NZ.

== Career ==
As an actor he is best known as Bob, the assistant of Lia Maivia, in Young Rock, Satan in Wellington Paranormal and Pigsy in the Netflix series The New Legends of Monkey.

He has frequently collaborated with production house thedownlowconcept starring as the lead in their movie Gary of the Pacific. He starred in and directed his own father in the award-winning web series Subject:Dad.

In 2021, Thomson appeared on the panel show Patriot Brains. Thomson won series 3 of Taskmaster NZ. In 2023, Thomson appeared on an episode of Guy Montgomery's Guy Mont-Spelling Bee.

In 2024, he was cast as Martin Katavake for the Australian adaptation of The Office.

He will portray the character Ledon in Godzilla x Kong: Supernova.
