= Madeleine Sami =

New Zealand actor, director, comedian and musician

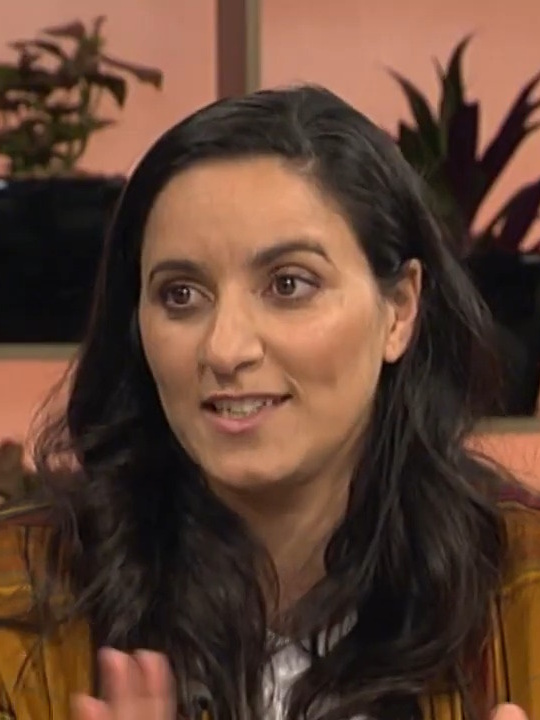
- Sami in 2018
- Born: Madeleine Nalini Sami; Auckland, New Zealand
- Occupations: Actress, director, comedian, musician
- Spouse: Ladyhawke (m. 2015–2023)
- Children: 1

Madeleine Nalini Sami (born 1980) is a New Zealand actress, director, comedian, and musician. She started her acting career in theatre before moving to television, where she created, co-wrote, and starred in Super City. She co-wrote, co-directed, and starred in the 2018 film The Breaker Upperers along with Jackie van Beek. Sami co-hosted The Great Kiwi Bake Off.

== Early life and education ==
Madeleine Nalini Sami is one of four children. Her parents are Christine Southee, who has Irish ancestry, and Naren Sami, a Fijian-Indian who immigrated to New Zealand from Fiji. Her parents separated when she was twelve.

She attended Onehunga High School.

== Career ==
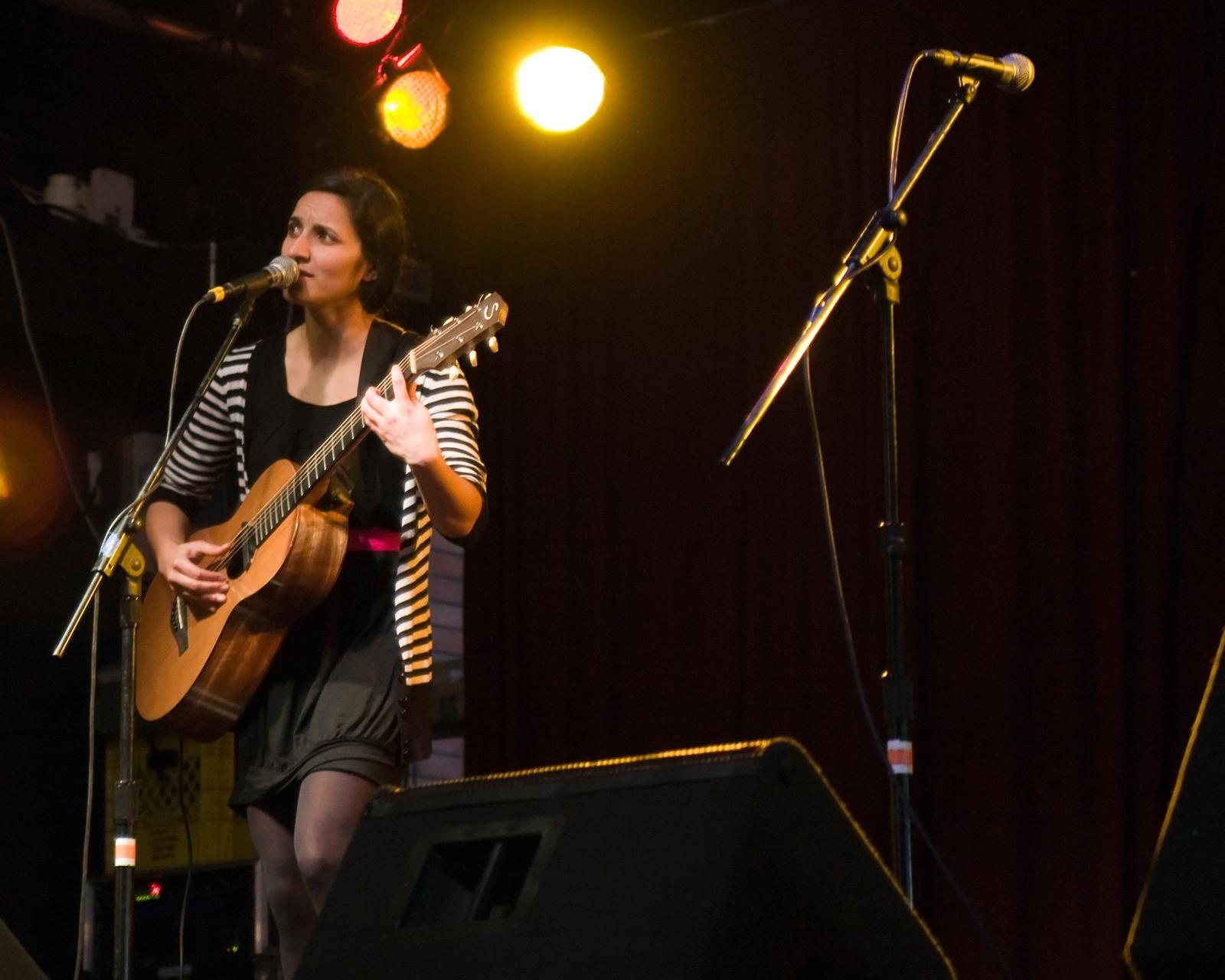
Madeleine Sami performing at the King's Arms, Auckland, 2007

Sami rose to prominence starring in Toa Fraser's play Bare, directed by Michael Robinson, winning Best newcomer and Best Actress at the 1999 Chapman Tripp Theatre Awards. She then was part of Fraser's next play, No. 2., which won a fringe first at the Edinburgh Fringe Festival.

In 2011, Sami created, co-wrote alongside Tom Sainsbury, and starred in her own comedy series, Super City, which was directed by Taika Waititi. Sami played five different characters in the show and won Best Performance by an Actress at the 2011 Aotearoa Film & Television Awards. She later co-hosted The Great Kiwi Bake Off and starred in the television series Golden Boy and The Bad Seed. She made her TV directorial debut with an episode of the second season of Funny Girls, eventually directing eleven episodes of the series.

Sami is a part of The Sami Sisters, a musical group consisting of herself and her two sisters. They released an album called Happy Heartbreak in 2011.

She co-wrote, co-directed, and starred in the 2018 film The Breaker Upperers, along with Jackie van Beek. The film received positive reviews and was a box office hit in New Zealand, becoming the best selling New Zealand film of 2018 and is one of the top 20 grossing New Zealand films ever. The pair are set to direct the Netflix film Hope, starring Aubrey Plaza. Sami also appeared in the 2019 film Come to Daddy, directed by Ant Timpson. and season 2 of Our Flag Means Death as Archie.

Madeleine has also directed and starred in two seasons of hit NZ tv show Double parked starring as Nat across from real life best friend Antonia Prebble.

Sami starred in the 2023 Australian television series Deadloch. On July 9, 2024, Deadloch was renewed for a second season, with Sami reprising the role of Eddie Redcliffe. She has been nominated for two logie awards for her role in the show.

She was a voice actor in the Australian comedy sci-fi film Lesbian Space Princess, which premiered at the Adelaide Film Festival in October 2024.

She is currently developing several films and TV shows and is also the host of The Traitors New Zealand.

== Personal life ==
In January 2015, Sami married Phillipa "Pip" Brown, more commonly known by her stage name Ladyhawke. Brown gave birth to their daughter in 2017. Sami and Brown announced the end of their relationship in 2023.

== Filmography ==
=== Film ===
Year	Title	Role	Notes
2000	Ice As: Ice House	Various	
2000	Fish Skin Suit	Libby	TV movie
2000	Teach You a Lesson	Narrator	Short film
2003	Perfect Strangers	Andrea	
2006	Sione's Wedding	Tania	
2007	Eagle vs Shark	Burger Girl Customer	
2009	Under the Mountain	Constable Green	
2012	Sione's 2: Unfinished Business	Tania	
2014	What We Do in the Shadows	Morana	
2015	Slow West	Marimacho	
2018	The Breaker Upperers	Mel	Also writer & director
2019	Come to Daddy	Gladys	
2020	Baby Done	Hospital Midwife	
2025	Lesbian Space Princess	Queen Anne	Voice actor

=== Television ===
Year	Title	Role	Notes
1998	Pio!	Various	
1999	Shortland Street	Dr. Shivani 'Vani' Naran	
2000	Fish Skin Suit	Libby	
2001	Xena: Warrior Princess	Tyro	Episode: "To Helicon and Back"
2004	Talent	Chemist	
2004	The Insiders Guide to Happiness	Tess	
2007	Rude Awakenings	Francesca Hoyle	
2007	Outrageous Fortune	Linda	
2006–2007	Bro'Town	Additional Voices/Bianca	5 episodes
2009	Diplomatic Immunity	Agent Amy Bickler	
2008–2009	The Jaquie Brown Diaries	Serita Singh	13 episodes
2009–2013	Buzzy Bee and Friends	Buzzy Bee	14 episodes
2009–2024	7 Days	Herself	21 episodes
2010	Radiradirah	Various	
2011	3 News	Self	
2011–2013	Super City	Pasha/Georgie/Azeem	Creator/writer/executive director
2013	Top of the Lake	Zena	
2013	Aroha Bridge	Mum/Aunty Winny/Angeline Hook	
2016	All Talk with Anika Moa	Self	
2016–2018	Funny Girls	Director	
2014	Flat3	Madeline	
2018–2021	The Great Kiwi Bake Off	Host	
2019	Get Krack!n	Amy Bryan	1 episode
2019	The Bad Seed	Marie Da Silva	5 episodes
2019	Golden Boy	Claire	8 episodes
2019	What's Your Problem?	Self	1 episode
2019–	Have You Been Paying Attention?	Guest	
2020, 2024	Taskmaster NZ	Self	10 episodes (contestant); 2 episodes (guest)
2021	The Masked Singer NZ	Monarch/Self	2 episodes
2023–present	Deadloch	Eddie Redcliffe	14 episodes
2023–present	Double Parked	Nat	9 episodes
2023	Our Flag Means Death	Archie	8 episodes

=== Theatre ===
Year	Title	Role	Theatre
1998	Three People in a Cinema	Various	Silo Theatre
1999	Legacy	Ensemble	Aotearoa Young People's Theatre
2000	No. 2	Various	Edinburgh Festival
2001	No. 2	Various	NZ Tour
2001	Bare	Various	Wellington Fringe Festival
2002	The Vagina Monologues	Various	Auckland Theatre Company
2005- 2006	Bad Jelly the Witch	Bad Jelly	Silo Theatre
2007	Some Girl(s)	Tyler	Silo Theatre
2008	Rabbit	Emily	Silo Theatre
2008	Whero's New Net	Various	Massive Company
2008	The 25th Annual Putnam County Spelling Bee	Logainne Schwartzandgrubenierre	Auckland Theatre Company
2009	No. 2	Various	Silo Theatre
2010	Dance Troupe Supreme	Kellyanna	Maidment Theatre
2014	Jesus Christ Superstar	King Herod	Auckland Theatre Company
2026	Losing face	Simone	Melbourne Theatre Company
