= Jackie van Beek =

New Zealand playwright, director and actor

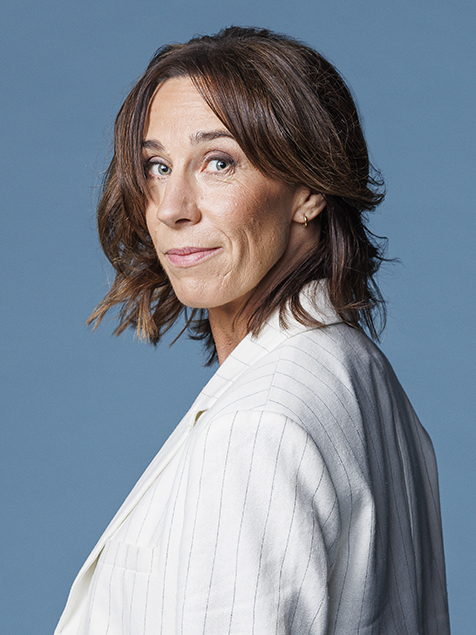
- Van Beek in 2018
- Born: Jacqueline van Beek; 10 May 1976 (age 50); Twizel, New Zealand
- Education: Onslow College, Victoria University
- Occupations: director, writer, actress, producer
- Years active: 1998–present
- Known for: Performing Arts
- Notable work: What We Do in the Shadows; The Breaker Upperers; Nude Tuesday; Time Bandits (TV series); The Office
- Spouse: Jesse Griffin
- Children: 3

Jackie van Beek (born 10 May 1976) is a New Zealand film and television director, writer and actress.

== Early life ==
Van Beek was born and raised in Wellington and attended Onslow College. She studied contemporary dance at the Wellington Performing Arts Centre, then completed a linguistics degree at Victoria University of Wellington, graduating in 1998. Throughout her studies she wrote and produced plays in Wellington theatres and schools.

== Career ==
In 1999 van Beek moved to Auckland and worked on theatre productions, and she spent a year at Ohio Northern University as the writer-in-residence. In 2006 van Beek moved to Australia and began making short films. Her first feature film was The Inland Road, which was screened at the Berlin International Film Festival and the Seattle International Film Festival, followed by her second feature film, The Breaker Upperers.

Van Beek has won a number of filmmaking awards, including SPADA New Filmmaker of the Year in 2013, as well as acting awards. In 2014 she won Best Supporting Actress at the New Zealand Film Awards for her performance in What We Do in the Shadows.

She is co-creator, with Jesse Griffin and Jonny Brugh, of the award-winning 2019 TV sitcom about teachers in a secondary school, called Educators. She also stars in the show. In 2024, she co-created the Australian adaptation of The Office with Julie De Fina.

== Personal life ==
Van Beek is married to comedian Jesse Griffin. They got engaged a month after they met in 2006. They have three children.

She is a cousin of writer Kathryn van Beek.

== Filmography ==
=== Plays ===
| Year | Title | Role | Notes |
|---|---|---|---|
| | The Swimming Lessons | Writer | |
| | The Mayfly | Writer | |
| | Space Migrant | Writer | |
| 2005 | My Brother and I are Porn Stars | Co-writer, lead actress | |

=== Films ===
| Year | Title | Role | Notes |
|---|---|---|---|
| 2007 | Eagle vs Shark | Burger Staff | Actress |
| 2008 | One Shoe Short | | |
| 2009 | Just Like The Others | | Co-producer |
| 2011 | Little Red Riding Hood | | Producer |
| 2011 | Go the Dogs | | Director, producer, writer |
| 2011 | In Safe Hands | | Director, writer, lead actress |
| 2014 | Uphill | | Director, writer, actress |
| 2014 | What We Do in the Shadows | Jackie | |
| 2017 | The Inland Road | | Director, writer |
| 2018 | The Breaker Upperers | Jen | Writer, co-director, actress |
| 2022 | Nude Tuesday | Laura | Writer, actress |
| 2024 | Audrey | Ronnie Lipsick | Actress |

=== Television ===
| Year | Title | Role | Notes |
|---|---|---|---|
| 2001 | Love Mussel | Actress | |
| 2007 | Rude Awakenings | Actress | |
| 2013-2015 | Best Bits | Panellist | |
| 2014 | Coverband | Stacey | Actress |
| 2014 | Short Poppies | Elisa | Actress |
| 2015-2018 | Funny Girls | Actress | |
| 2016-2017 | 800 Words | Gloria | |
| 2018 | Wellington Paranormal | Director | |
| 2019 | What We Do in the Shadows | Director | |
| 2019-2025 | Educators | Robyn | Also co-creator of the TVNZ+ (formerly TVNZ OnDemand) series, which is largely improvised |
| 2024 | The Office | Co-creator, director, writer and executive producer | Based on the British series of the same name |
| 2025 | Taskmaster NZ | Self | Season 6 |
