= Jordan Rondel =

American entrepreneur

Jordan Daphne Rondel (born April 8, 1989) is a New Zealand–born, Los Angeles–based entrepreneur, recipe writer. She is the founder of The Caker, a high-end box cake mix range.

== Early life and education ==
Rondel graduated from the University of Auckland in 2010 with a Bachelor of Commerce majoring in International Business and Marketing.

== Career ==
Rondel founded The Caker in 2010 after interning at architecture firms. It started out as a recipe blog she did on the side in 2013 while working a part-time job and studying business at a college in Auckland. The blog became a "vehicle for selling cakes," Rondel said.

In 2015, Anouk Rondel, Jordan's sister, joined The Caker. To expand the brand further, Jordan and Anouk moved to Los Angeles in 2019.

Rondel was a judge on The Great Kiwi Bake Off seasons 4 and 5. Jordan has also been a recipe contributor to the New Zealand Sunday magazine since 2013. In 2023, Rondel’s flagship bakery on Karangahape Road closed its doors to the public.

In 2022, Chrissy Teigen was accused of stealing recipes from Rondel.
