= Sue Fleischl =

New Zealand chef

Sue Fleischl is a New Zealand chef and business owner.

== Biography ==
Fleischl grew up in Napier, in New Zealand's North Island, and decided to become a chef at the age of 11. When she was 15, her father started writing letters to restaurants and hotels in Europe, asking for a position for her. The only reply was from London's Savoy Hotel, so at the age of 17, in 1985, Fleischl flew to London and spent two years at the hotel. She returned to New Zealand briefly, then moved to Bangkok and then to Melbourne. She started her own catering company in Melbourne, called "Sue-Chef Catering".

In the early 1990s she returned to New Zealand again, and worked with Julie Le Clerc in her cafe in Kingsland, Auckland. In 1995 she started The Great Catering Company with three corporate clients. She has grown the multi-million dollar company to employ 18 staff. In 2012 she opened Abbeville Estate, near Auckland Airport, and provides catering there for wedding parties and receptions.

Since 2018, Fleischl has appeared as a judge on the New Zealand television series The Great Kiwi Bake Off.

=== Awards and recognition ===
In 2016, Fleischl was inducted into the New Zealand Restaurant Association Hall of Fame in recognition of her contribution and leadership in the hospitality sector. The Great Catering Company has twice won the Lewisham Caterer of the Year Award.
