= Fred Award =

New Zealand International Comedy Festival award

- Awarded for: Best show by a Kiwi comedian at the NZICF
- Sponsored by: New Zealand Comedy Trust
- Location: SkyCity Auckland
- Country: New Zealand
- Presented by: Previous winner
- Reward: NZ$5,000
- First award: 2006; 20 years ago

Highlights
- Most awards: Dai Henwood (2); Trygve Wakenshaw (2)
- Website: Fred Award

The Fred Award is the highest honour at the New Zealand International Comedy Festival, awarded to the best show written and performed by a New Zealand comedian.

The award is named in honour of New Zealand comedian John Clarke's most well-known character, Fred Dagg. Dagg was one of New Zealand's most recognisable comedic characters during the 1970s and is considered to be an icon of New Zealand pop culture. The winner receives a trophy of Dagg's gumboot.

== History ==
The award was established in 2006 by the NZ Comedy Trust to recognise "The outstanding work of an established professional kiwi comedian." In 2014 the criteria were simplified to become "best show" by a New Zealander.

"The Fred" Gumboot is presented along with the Billy T Award at the end of festival prize-giving showcase "Last Laughs" where nominated finalists perform their final set of the festival. The winner is decided by a panel of judges and the prize is presented by the winner from the previous year.

== Winners ==
Fred Award winners by year
| Year | Winner | Other nominees |
|---|---|---|
| 2006 | Brendhan Lovegrove, The Brendhan Lovegrove Project | |
| 2007 | Dai Henwood, Dai-namic Scenario | Ewen Gilmour; Te Radar |
| 2008 | Ben Hurley, Boom | The Outwits; Justine Smith, Return of the Jussi |
| 2009 | Te Radar, Eating the Dog | Paul Ego; Steve Wrigley |
| 2010 | Wilson Dixon, Wilson Dixon's American Dream | |
| 2011 | Jan Maree, Fever Bitch! | |
| 2012 | Rhys Darby, This Way to Spaceship | Brendhan Lovegrove, Bury Me Happy; The Boy With Tape On His Face, More Tape |
| 2013 | Jarred Christmas, Let's Go Mofo | James Nokise, So-So Gangsta; Nick Rado, The Funniest Joke in the World |
| 2014 | Trygve Wakenshaw, Kraken | Jamie Bowen, Heart Goes Boom; Rhys Darby, Mr. Adventure |
| 2015 | Dai Henwood, Daigression | Jamie Bowen, Head Goes Bang; Urzila Carlson, Man Up |
| 2016 | Rhys Mathewson, Nouveau Rhys | Pax Assadi, In Mid-Season Form; Nic Sampson, Nic Sampson Has Fallen Down A Well |
| 2017 | Rose Matafeo, Sassy Best Friend | Fuq Boiz (Hamish Parkinson and Ryan Richards), Fuq Boiz; Eli Matthewson, The Year of Magical Fucking; Guy Montgomery, Let's All Get in a Room Together |
| 2018 | Chris Parker, Camp Binch | Frickin Dangerous Bro (Pax Assadi, James Roque, Jamaine Ross), Humble; Rose Matafeo, Horndog; Nick Rado, Nail It! |
| 2019 | James Nokise, God Damn Fancy Man | Barnie Duncan, Tap Head; James Roque, Boy Mestizo |
| 2021 | Eli Matthewson, Daddy-Short-Legs | David Correos, David Correos is David Postoffice; Two Hearts (Laura Daniel and Joseph Moore), We're Pregnant and The Baby is Music |
| 2023 | Guy Montgomery, My Brain is Blowing Me Crazy | Brendon Green, I'm Happy You're Here; Jamaine Ross, Vaguely Familiar |
| 2024 | Barnie Duncan and Trygve Wakenshaw, Different Party | Alice Snedden, Highly Credible; Hayley Sproull, Wild Flutters |
| 2025 | Angella Dravid, I'm Happy for You | Melanie Bracewell, A Little Treat; Abby Howells, Welcome to my Dream |
| 2026 | David Correos, Touching My Active Mind | Melanie Bracewell, Dilly Dallying; Bubbah, Lonly Fans |
