= Guy Montgomery's Guy Mont-Spelling Bee =

New Zealand comedy TV series

- Genre: Comedy; Panel show Game show
- Created by: Guy Montgomery
- Presented by: Guy Montgomery
- Starring: Sanjay Patel
- Composer: Mahuia Bridgman-Cooper
- Country of origin: New Zealand
- Original language: English
- No. of series: 3
- No. of episodes: 24

Production
- Camera setup: Multi-camera
- Running time: 45 minutes
- Production companies: Kevin & Co.

Original release
- Network: Three
- Release: 16 February 2023 – present

Related
- Guy Montgomery's Guy Mont-Spelling Bee (Australia)

Guy Montgomery's Guy Mont-Spelling Bee (Note: Sometimes Guy Montgomery's Guy Mont-Spelling Bee New Zealand.) is a New Zealand television comedy panel show on Three, created and presented by Guy Montgomery and co-hosted by Sanjay Patel. The show is loosely based on a spelling bee: each episode, four comedians participate in a series of rounds, where the goal is almost always to spell words or names in rounds that are "designed to be infuriating to take part in and entertaining to watch". The winner of each episode competes again the following week, and the loser of each episode (the one who got last place) must wear a dunce cap in the Dunce's Corner.

The first series of Guy Mont-Spelling Bee aired in 2023, and the second series aired in late 2024. An Australian version of the show was commissioned by the Australian Broadcasting Corporation (ABC) in 2024, which has since run for three series.

A third series was commissioned in 2025, and was broadcast from August 2026.

== Background and production ==
Guy Montgomery, inspired by the Scripps National Spelling Bee, began hosting spelling bees with other comedians over Zoom and broadcast live on YouTube during the COVID-19 pandemic. Following the success of those games, Montgomery developed the concept into a show at the Melbourne International Comedy Festival, and then into a television show in 2023.

=== YouTube broadcasts ===
The first YouTube series of six broadcasts took place in 2020. The contestants were Tim Batt, Tom Sainsbury, Rose Matafeo, Madeleine Sami, Paul Williams, Alice Snedden, Jackie van Beek, Kura Forrester, Chris Parker, Ayo Edebiri, Paul F. Tompkins, Blair Socci, Joe Mande, Aaron Chen, Lily Sullivan, Colin Burgess, Jamie Loftus and Amy Hoggart.

A shorter, second series of contests were streamed in 2021, featuring Laura Daniel, Urzila Carlson, David Correos, Rebecca Lucas, Alexei Toliopoulos, Angella Dravid, Brynley Stent, Concetta Caristo, Chris Parker, Alice Snedden, and Pax Assadi.

=== Live shows ===
After the streaming broadcasts, Montgomery took the spelling bee to the Melbourne International Comedy Festival in 2022, performing four shows across April. The guests for each show were Becky Lucas, Urzila Carlson, Chris Parker, and Suren Jayemanne; Melanie Bracewell, Sam Campbell, Phil Wang, and Rhys Nicholson; Emma Holland, David O'Doherty, Luke Heggie, and Fern Brady; and Danielle Walker and Vidya Rajan.

Guy Mont-Spelling Bee returned to the MICF in 2023, with five shows. The guests this year were Tim Batt, Josie Long, Patrick Golamco, and Patti Harrison; Anne Edmonds, Mark Watson, Jason Leong, and Frankie McNair; Ed Gamble, Courtney Dawson, Tim Key, and Chloe Petts; Kitty Flanagan, Urzila Carlson, Sam Pang, and Ed Kavalee; and Michael Hing, Rosie Jones, Geraldine Hickey, and Guy Williams. The next month in May 2023, Guy Mont-Spelling Bee premiered in Sydney.

A bee was held in August 2023 in Auckland, featuring Abby Howells, Courtney Dawson, Joe Daymond, and David Correos. Another live bee at the 2024 Melbourne International Comedy Festival featured John Kearns, Anne Edmonds, Anirban Dasgupta, and Fern Brady.

=== Television ===
Ordered by Discovery NZ, Guy Mont-Spelling Bee was developed into a television show by Montgomery together with comedian Joseph Moore and the production company Kevin & Co. Funding of the show comes from NZ On Air. Montgomery also serves as the showrunner.

The "retro" feel of the show is intentional, as Montgomery wanted the set to feel "timeless" by using physical props and as few screens as possible. Sacha Young was the stylist for the production. Additionally, Montgomery notes that the "hokey" title of the show "sets the tone for the experience".

Series 1 was filmed in November 2022 in Auckland, and was broadcast for eight weeks starting in February 2023 at the 7.30 pm timeslot on Three. On 10 July 2023, it was announced that the show had been renewed for a second eight-episode series.

Series 2 was filmed in November 2023 with at least one guest, Rose Matafeo, confirmed before broadcast. New episodes aired once a week for eight weeks at the slightly earlier 7.00 pm timeslot starting on 22 August 2024 on Three.

The third series was filmed in October 2025, with an airdate confirmed for 6 August 2026. Guests announced prior to broadcast were Johanna Cosgrove, Oscar Kightley, Jason Gunn, Lana Walters, Lynda Topp, and Bret McKenzie. Writers for this series were confirmed as Abby Howells and Rhys Mathewson.

== Format ==
Every episode begins with The Spelling Round, a standard spelling bee round in which the contestants select a word from three containers with varying levels of spelling difficulty ranging from 1–3 points: the Coward's Cup, the Person's Purse, or the Bucket of Bravery. Other rounds include:

=== Rounds introduced in season 1 ===
- Celebrities: Guests spell a celebrity's name given their picture.
- Choose A Letter: Guests pick a letter, and then must spell a given animal name without using that letter.
- Feelings: Guests must identify an item by touch and then spell it.
- Flags: Guests pick words from a board covered in flags, national or otherwise.
- Hard Words For a 13 Year Old: Guests are each joined by a 13-year-old, who may win a prize.
  - This round returned in season 2 under the name Hard Words for a Fourteen Year Old, where they are joined by the same children as the last season's round.
- High School Photo: Guests bring in photos from their time in high school and Montgomery picks a winner; "hardly even a game at all."
- Homophones: Guests must spell the correct word from homophones.
- Household Adjectives: Guests pick household items and then must spell a given adjective related to the item.
- How Many Letters: Guests guess how many letters are in a jar.
- Instruments: Guests hear a musical instrument and must spell it.
- Invent A Word: Guests must create the best new word for a given concept.
- Object Round: Guests spell a given word using physical objects.
- Punctuation: Guests are shown punctuation marks and must spell them.
- Social Media: Montgomery confronts guests with past social media posts, and they must recreate or rectify typos, or spell a given related word.
- Spell It Better: Guests invent a new and improved spelling for an existing word.
- Spell It On A Calculator: Guests must use a calculator to spell a given word.
- Spell Like a Six Year Old: Guests must match the spelling of a 6-year-old child.
- Spell The Animal: Montgomery wears a series of animal masks which inspire the words that the guests must spell.
- Spell The Audience Name: Guests choose a member of the audience and then must spell their full name.
- Spell The Colour: Guests pick words to spell from a multi-coloured board.
- Wingdings: Guests must translate a word displayed in Wingdings.

=== Rounds introduced in season 2 ===
- A Clever Round Of Spelling Things Interestingly and Creatively (ACROSTIC): Guests make an acrostic from a given word that must also be spelled correctly.
- The Animal Kingdom: select an animal from the board, and then spell the collective noun used to refer a group of them.
- Customs: Guests spell items prohibited from importation to New Zealand by the New Zealand Customs Service, trying to get the longest word among them. To be eligible for points, it must be spelled correctly as one word.
- A Decent Proposal: Guests are put into pairs. Each guest is assigned one easy word and one very hard word to have their partner spell. This is a prisoner's dilemma situation. If both guests spell correctly, they get two points each. If only one guest in the pair spells correctly, that guest gets four points.
- The Emotional Round: Guests spell and make emotions. Two separate points can be earned, one for spelling and one for performing the emotion.
- The Gift of Spelling: A Christmas-themed round in which guests spell the word based on the gift they received.
- The Hat Hat: Guests choose and wear a hat and spell it. Guests may remove their hat only on the next time they give a correct spelling.
- Horsing: A Round: Each guest has a horse assigned to them in a "horse race." Before starting the race, guests can bet up to five points on a horse they believe will win at 2/1 odds. A correct spelling moves their horse forward.
- Idioms: Guests try to spell the missing word in the idiom they chose.
- Letters: Guests must spell a specific word from mail that Guy has 'stolen from his neighbour'.
- Money: Guests pick a value of physical currency and spell a word associated with it. If they answer incorrectly, the selected denomination is deducted from their paycheck.
- Shut Up and Spell: Working in teams of two, one guest mimes a word to the other, who has to both guess the word and spell it correctly.
- Spel Itt Wurst: Guests try to spell the given word in the worst way possible; they can be penalised for giving an overly accurate spelling.
- Spell a Swear Word: Invent a new swear word, and explain it.
- Spell the Crew Member's Name: Guests must identify and spell the correct full name of a crew member of the show.
- Spell the Crime, Do the Time: Guests take turns to spell crime-related words; making a mistake causes them to "go to prison".
- Spell the Smell: Without their sense of sight, guests guess (using their sense of smell) and spell the contents of their given jar.
- Spell the Soup: Each guest is given the same soup in which they must identify and spell.
- Spelling Well: Guests attempt to decipher a word that Sanjay yells from within a well, and as a result is muffled and hard to hear.
- The Spelling Spell: Guests spell a word describing the object transformed with magic. The guest may ask to conjure again up to twice for a harder word that has twice the value of the previous word.
- The Time Machine: Guests have to spell words that originated from a specific year in history.
- Wifi Round: Guests pick a modem, and have to spell the Wi-Fi password for it.

=== The Buzz Round ===
Each episode ends with The Buzz Round, a themed, timed, fast-paced round in which contestants hit a buzzer first for the chance to spell each word; they lose a point if the spelling is incorrect. Montgomery may interrupt the guest at any time if they make a mistake in their spelling. The contestant in last place before the round begins gets to pick one of four categories provided; if there is a tie for last place, the guest closest to Montgomery gets the choice of categories. The time limit of this round varies with episode, ending once the voice of the "spelling gods" is heard.

If there is a tie between contestants with the highest score, a tie-break word is provided among the tied contestants. The player who spells the word correctly wins the episode, while an incorrect spelling forfeits the episode.

== Episodes ==
Series	Episodes	Originally released	
Series	Episodes	First released	Last released
1	8	16 February 2023	6 April 2023
2	8	22 August 2024	10 October 2024
3	8	6 August 2026	TBA

=== Series 1 (2023) ===
The average rating across the first three episodes was 106,000, which had improved to 118,100 for the average rating across the last three episodes.

No. in series	Title	Guests	Original release date
1	"The Yum Is Silent"	Abby Howells, Matt Heath, **Hayley Sproull**, Josh Thomson	16 February 2023
The Spelling Round; Spell It Better; Spell the Colour; Social Media; Spell Like a Six Year Old; The Buzz Round (sport)
2	"I Just Paint Myself Blue Sometimes"	**Brynley Stent**, Chris Parker, Courtney Dawson, Hayley Sproull	23 February 2023
The Spelling Round; Invent A Word; Flags; Hard Words For a 13 Year Old; Homophones; The Buzz Round (spooky) In the Hard Words for a 13 Year Old round, Hayley was paired with Chris, Courtney with Jordyn, Parker with Pearl, and Brynley with Vinnie.
3	"No One Is Wrestling, We're Spelling"	Urzila Carlson, Tim Batt, **James Mustapic**, Brynley Stent	2 March 2023
The Spelling Round; Wingdings; Spell the Animal; Household Adjectives; Spell The Audience Name; The Buzz Round (religion)
4	"Hail Satin"	Angella Dravid, Guy Williams, Audrey Porne, **James Mustapic**	9 March 2023
The Spelling Round; Object Round; Celebrities; Social Media; Homophones; The Buzz Round (romance)
5	"Screwed Over by an 'E' Again"	Laura Daniel, **David Correos**, Becky Lucas, James Mustapic	16 March 2023
The Spelling Round; Choose A Letter; Spell the Colour; Instruments; Spell Like a Six Year Old; The Buzz Round (human body)
6	"The Patriarchy Hasn't Let Me Down"	Ray O'Leary, Mel Bracewell, **Jamaine Ross**, David Correos	23 March 2023
The Spelling Round; How Many Letters; Flags; Feelings; Spell The Audience Name; The Buzz Round (numbers)
7	"Lock it in Eddie"	Kura Forrester, Jack Ansett, Karen O'Leary, **Jamaine Ross**	30 March 2023
The Spelling Round; Spell It On A Calculator; Celebrities; Household Adjectives; Homophones; The Buzz Round (fruit)
8	"Don't Be Funny, Just Win"	Paul Williams, Bubbah Olo, **Dai Henwood**, Jamaine Ross	6 April 2023
The Spelling Round; High School Photo; Spell the Colour; Punctuation; Spell Like a Six Year Old; The Buzz Round (cinema)

=== Series 2 (2024) ===
The series premiere recorded 98,800 viewers. The average viewership of the episodes broadcast in September 2024 was 77,700. After a brief uptick, viewership then settled at 75,600 for the final episode.

No. overall	No. in series	Title	Guests	Original release date
9	1	"Guy Montgomery's Mum, I'm Coming for You"	Kura Turuwhenua, Tom Sainsbury, **Nina Oyama**, Dai Henwood	22 August 2024
The Spelling Round; ACROSTIC; The Gift of Spelling; Spell the Crime, Do the Time; Homophones; The Buzz Round (technology)
10	2	"That's Not a Spelling, This Is a Spelling"	Pax Assadi, Justine Smith, **Robbie Nicol**, Nina Oyama	29 August 2024
The Spelling Round; Spel Itt Wurst; The Hat Hat; Horsing: A Round; Spell the Smell; The Buzz Round (geography)
11	3	"You Are Dirt, You're Scum"	Rose Matafeo, **Eli Matthewson**, Becky Umbers, Robbie Nicol	5 September 2024
The Spelling Round; Spell the Soup; Hard Words for a 14-Year-Old (offered $1,000 in $5 notes, won by Matafeo); A Decent Proposal; The Emotional Round; The Buzz Round (music) In the Hard Words for a 14-Year-Old round, Nicol was paired with Chris, Becky with Jordyn, Matthewson with Pearl, and Matafeo with Vinnie.
12	4	"Spelling Bee Crazy"	**Rhys Mathewson**, Liv McKenzie, Itay Dom, Eli Matthewson	12 September 2024
The Spelling Round; Customs; Idioms; The Spelling Spell; Social Media; The Buzz Round (space) Rhys Mathewson holds the record for the highest score in a single episode, with 16 points.
13	5	"I Do Like a Jazzy Cigarette on Occasion"	Maria Williams, Jason Hoyte, Julia Morris, **Rhys Mathewson**	19 September 2024
The Spelling Round; Spell a Swear Word; Feelings; The Animal Kingdom; Spell the Audience Name; The Buzz Round (ancient Egypt)
14	6	"I Before E, Except After F"	Paul Douglas, Kalyani Nagarajan, Jono Pryor, **Rhys Mathewson**	26 September 2024
The Spelling Round; Spelling Well; Money; Shut Up and Spell; Wifi Round; The Buzz Round (World War II)
15	7	"You Lost Me at, 'I Like You'"	Rhiannon McCall, **Ben Hurley**, Jaquie Brown, Rhys Mathewson	3 October 2024
The Spelling Round; Spell the Crew Member's Name; Flags; A Decent Proposal; Social Media; The Buzz Round (drinks)
16	8	"It's Not Your Fault, It's the Time Machine"	Joe Daymond, Janaye Henry, Paul Ego, **Ben Hurley**	10 October 2024
The Spelling Round; Spelling It Better; The Time Machine; Letters; Spell the Audience Name; The Buzz Round (New Zealand history) Paul Ego was awarded a word after The Buzz Round had concluded, and - after answering it correctly - thus an extra point, which did not materially impact on his position against the other contestants, remaining the dunce.

Winners in bold, dunces in italics.

=== Series 3 (2026) ===
The series was filmed in October 2025 and consists of 8 episodes.

No. overall	No. in series	Title	Guests	Original release date
17	1	"It's An Ass Specialist!"	Lana Walters, Oscar Kightley, Johanna Cosgrove, **Ben Hurley**	6 August 2026
The Spelling Round; Personalised Plates; The Spelling Round Again; Show and Spell, What Do You Do?, The Buzz Round (mermaids)
18	2	TBA	Sam Campbell, **Lesa Macleod-Whiting**, Tofiga Fepuleaʻi, Ben Hurley	13 August 2026
The Spelling Round; Theosaurus; The Hat Hat; Battle of the Codes; Wheel of Four Tunes; The Buzz Round (eggs) In Battle of the Codes, Ben was paired with Sam Cosgrove, Tofiga with Tyla King, Lesa with Bernice Mene and Sam with Leo Takahashi.
19	3	TBA	Madeleine Sami, **Jeremy Corbett**, Lynda Topp, Lesa Macleod-Whiting	20 August 2026
The Spelling Round; Neighbourhood Watch; Is That What I Look Like?; Homophones; The Buzz Round (musicals)
20	4	TBA	Jason Gunn, **Donna Brookbanks**, Henry Yan, Jeremy Corbett	27 August 2026
The Spelling Round; Spell the Spookiest Word; A Word in the Hand; An Offer You Can Refuse; Spelling Gym; The Buzz Round (precious gems)
21	5	TBA	**Jesse Mulligan**, Annie Guo, James Roque, Donna Brookbanks	3 September 2026
The Spelling Round; Name That Baby; Guy Montgomery's Guy Mont-Beauty Paegant; Hard Words To Spell For A Sixteen Year Old; Spell The Difference; The Buzz Round (P.U. stinky)
22	6	TBA	Anika Moa, **Bailey Poching**, Mike Minogue, Jesse Mulligan	10 September 2026
The Spelling Round; Hangman; O! What a Knight!; For Whom The Spell Tolls; Do The D.A.N.C.E.; The Buzz Round (magic)
23	7	TBA	Bret McKenzie, Michèle A'Court, Jonny Brugh, **Bailey Poching**	17 September 2026
The Spelling Round; Spell Your Own Epitaph; The Time Machine; Impressions; Quadcathlon; The Buzz Round (the shops)
24	8	TBA	Jackie van Beek, Jesse Griffin, Hoani Hotene, **Bailey Poching**	24 September 2026
The Spelling Round; A New Idiom; Spelling Carnival; Spell It Backwards; Spell the Audience Name; The Buzz Round (spicy)

Winners in bold, dunces in italics.

== Australian version ==
The Australian Broadcasting Corporation (ABC) commissioned an Australian version of the show in April 2024. It premiered on 14 August 2024 on ABC TV.
