= Patriot Brains =

New Zealand TV show

- Genre: Comedy panel game
- Presented by: Bill Bailey (series 1); Sue Perkins (series 2)
- Composer: James Dansey
- Country of origin: New Zealand
- Original language: English
- No. of seasons: 2
- No. of episodes: 20

Production
- Camera setup: Multi-camera
- Running time: 44 minutes
- Production company: thedownlowconcept

Original release
- Network: TVNZ 2, SBS Viceland
- Release: 7 April 2021 – present

Patriot Brains is a New Zealand comedy panel game show, airing on TVNZ 2 in New Zealand and SBS Viceland in Australia since April 2021.

== Premise ==
The show, hosted by English comedian Bill Bailey in series 1 and Sue Perkins in series 2, focuses on the trans-Tasman rivalry by pitting two teams of three comics from Australia and New Zealand against each other. The host asks the teams a series of general knowledge questions about their respective countries from a revolving pool of categories.

== Production ==
New Zealand production company thedownlowconcept produces the series, which receives funding from NZ On Air.

== Broadcast ==
The first series of Patriot Brains aired in early 2021 in Australia and New Zealand, and the second series was broadcast in February 2023 in New Zealand.

== Episodes ==
=== Series 1 ===
No. in series	Team Australia	Team New Zealand	Original release date
1	**Mel Buttle, Rhys Nicholson, Tom Ballard**	Melanie Bracewell, Guy Montgomery, Madeleine Sami	7 April 2021 (NZ); 13 April 2021 (AU)
2	Mel Buttle, Rhys Nicholson, Harley Breen	**Hayley Sproull, Josh Thomson, Ray O'Leary**	14 April 2021 (NZ); 20 April 2021 (AU)
3	**Mel Buttle, Aaron Chen, Tom Ballard**	**Mel Bracewell, Hayley Sproull, Josh Thomson**	21 April 2021 (NZ); 27 April 2021 (AU)
4	Mel Buttle, Laura Davis, Aaron Chen	**Mel Bracewell, Rhys Darby, Laura Daniel**	28 April 2021 (NZ); 4 May 2021 (AU)
5	**Mel Buttle, Aaron Chen, Tom Ballard**	Mel Bracewell, Kura Forrester, Ben Hurley	5 May 2021 (NZ); 11 May 2021 (AU)
6	Mel Buttle, Rhys Nicholson, Harley Breen	**Mel Bracewell, Ben Hurley, Laura Daniel**	12 May 2021 (NZ); 18 May 2021 (AU)
7	Mel Buttle, Aaron Chen, Harley Breen	**Mel Bracewell, James Nokise, Guy Montgomery**	19 May 2021 (NZ); 25 May 2021 (AU)
8	**Mel Buttle, Laura Davis, Tom Ballard**	Mel Bracewell, Justine Smith, Pax Assadi	26 May 2021 (NZ); 1 June 2021 (AU)
9	**Mel Buttle, Laura Davis, Tom Ballard**	Mel Bracewell, Hayley Sproull, Josh Thomson	2 June 2021 (NZ); 8 June 2021 (AU)
10	**Mel Buttle, Aaron Chen, Harley Breen**	Mel Bracewell, Cori Gonzalez-Macuer, Ben Hurley	9 June 2021 (NZ); 15 June 2021 (AU)

Note: Winners are listed in bold.

=== Series 2 ===
No. in series	Team Australia	Team New Zealand	Original release date
1	**Becky Lucas, Nath Valvo, Brett Blake**	Angella Dravid, Josh Thomson, Guy Montgomery	10 February 2023 (NZ); 14 June 2023 (AU)
2	Alex Ward, Luke McGregor, Brett Blake	**Dai Henwood, Ben Hurley, Hayley Sproull**	17 February 2023 (NZ)
3	Becky Lucas, Nath Valvo, Brett Blake	**Urzila Carlson, Hayley Sproull, Pax Assadi**	24 February 2023 (NZ)
4	**Nazeem Hussain, Alex Ward, Harley Breen**	Josh Thomson, Angella Dravid, Ben Hurley	3 March 2023 (NZ)
5	**Becky Lucas, Nath Valvo, Heath Franklin**	Becky Umbers, Chris Parker, Guy Montgomery	10 March 2023 (NZ)
6	Becky Lucas, Suraj Kolarkar, Nazeem Hussain	**Hayley Sproull, Urzila Carlson, Josh Thomson**	17 March 2023 (NZ)
7	Becky Lucas, Nazeem Hussain, Heath Franklin	**Chris Parker, Urzila Carlson, Guy Montgomery**	24 March 2023 (NZ)
8	**Alex Ward, Luke McGregor, Brett Blake**	Josh Thomson, Angella Dravid, Ben Hurley	31 March 2023 (NZ)
9	Luke McGregor, Alex Ward, Harley Breen	**Ray O'Leary, Becky Umbers, Ben Hurley**	14 April 2023 (NZ)
10	**Luke McGregor, Alex Ward, Claire Hooper**	Ray O'Leary, Becky Umbers, Dai Henwood	21 April 2023 (NZ)

Note: Winners are listed in bold.
