= Billy T Award =

New Zealand comedy award

- Awarded for: Kiwi comedian with "outstanding potential" at the NZICF
- Sponsored by: New Zealand Comedy Trust
- Location: SkyCity Auckland
- Country: New Zealand
- Presented by: Previous winner
- Reward: NZ$5,000
- First award: 1997; 29 years ago

Highlights
- Most nominations: Jamie Bowen (4); Benjamin Crellin (4)
- Website: Billy T Award

The Billy T Award is a New Zealand comedy award recognising up-and-coming New Zealand comedians with outstanding potential. It has been presented annually since its inception in 1997 when Cal Wilson and Ewen Gilmour shared the award. The Billy T was shared between two comedians until 2001 when it became a solo award.

The Billy T Award is presented alongside the Fred Award as part of an initiative by the New Zealand Comedy Trust to "foster and encourage outstanding New Zealand talent".

== Billy T. James ==
The Billy T Awards were named in honour of New Zealand comedian Billy T. James. The winner receives ‘the yellow towel’ in tribute to the towel worn by James in some of his most famous sketches.

== Judging ==
The winner is selected from five nominees performing during the New Zealand International Comedy Festival. Five judges select a winner based on their proven comedic ability, talent, dedication and potential.

== Winners and nominees ==
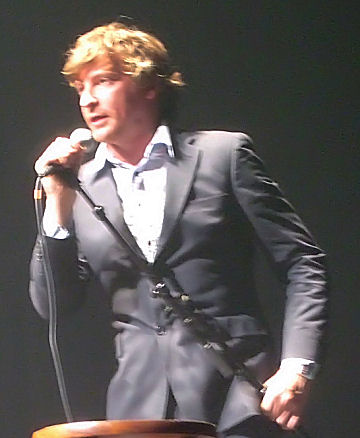
2001 and 2002 nominee Rhys Darby

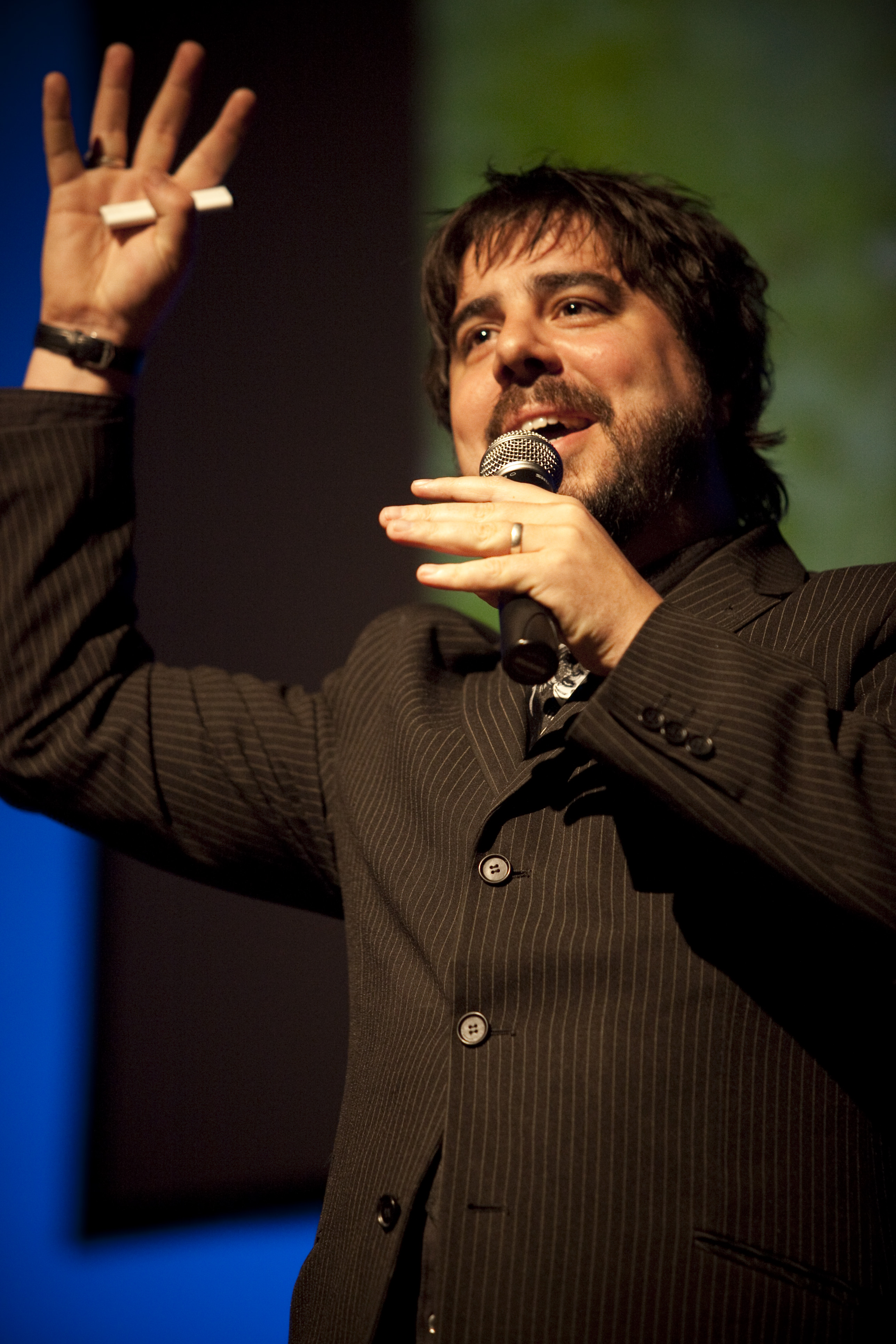
2004 winner Ben Hurley

Year	Billy T recipient(s)	Other nominees
1997	Cal Wilson, Dirty Bitch; Ewen Gilmour, Once Were Westies	Mike King; Brendhan Lovegrove; Radar; Raybon Kan
1998	Brendhan Lovegrove; Radar (Andrew Lumsden); Sugar and Spice (Jonathan Brugh and Jason Hoyte)	Philip Patston; Jaq Tweedie
1999	Philip Patston; The Humourbeasts (Jemaine Clement and Taika Cohen)	Paul Ego; Irene Pink; Jon Stubbs
2000	Mike Loder; Paul Ego, Cool	Jan Maree, Chick With Skills; Irene Pink, Summertime With Irene; Benjamin Crellin, Midful
2001	Jan Maree, It's In the Bag	Jeremy Elwood, Live From The Shadows; Rhys Darby, Rhys Darby and the Supernova; Jon Stubbs; Benjamin Crellin
2002	Dai Henwood, The Story of Funk	Rhys Darby, The Neon Outlaw; Tarun Mohanbhai, A D'Arranged Marriage; Benjamin Crellin, Pisstaker; GARY (Brett O'Gorman, Jamie Bowen and Mick Andrews), A Forbidden Score
2003	Justine Smith, The Justine Smith Hour	Penny Ashton, Dirty Pink; Sully O'Sullivan, Scriptless; Benjamin Crellin, Smacked Up; GARY (Brett O'Gorman, Jamie Bowen and Mick Andrews), Happy As Gary
2004	Ben Hurley, Political and Stuff	Cohen Holloway, Big Ted Speaks Out; Ezequiel Balmori, A War on Idiots; Jamie Bowen, Victim of Trend; Penny Ashton, Hot Pink Does Vegas
2005	Sam Wills, Dance Monkey Dance: The Evolution of Sam Wills	Cori Gonzalez-Macuer, I Love David Hasselhoff; Darren Jardine, Just A Buck Eejit; James Nokise, Enter The Jandal; Jo Randerson, Skazzle-Dazzle
2006	Cori Gonzalez-Macuer, The Neverending Cori	James Nokise, White Club; Jerome Chandrahasen, Backpacker's Guide; Cameron Blair, Gifted; Gish (Justin Hansen), Solid Rolled Hits
2007	Mrs Peacock (Jarrod Baker and Dave Smith), Rock 101	Alex Hawley, Party On; Jamie Bowen, I Do These Things So You Don't Have To... Grant Lobban
2008	Steve Wrigley, The First Time	Simon McKinney, Land of the Long White Clown; Grant Lobban, Laugh You Long Time; Armstrong Creative, The Lonesome Buckwhips; Jim Brown, A Woven Hour
2009	Chris Brain, In a Better Place	Jim Brown, A Legend in His Own Bathwater; James Keating, Billbored; Vaughan King, Inventor; Dave Wiggins, I'm a Believer
2010	Rhys Mathewson, Rhyspect	Jarred Fell, Dangerous Ideas; Clayton Carrick-Leslie, Bring It; Vaughan King, 0 to 20 in 60 Minutes; TJ McDonald, A Māori Ate My Great Granddad
2011	Nick Gibb, Pakehas Be All Like This	Urzila Carlson, The Truth According to Urzila Carlson; Joseph Harper, Bikes I've Owned Versus Girls I've Fallen In Love With; Cameron Murray, Logical Oddity; Nick Rado, Rado & Juliet
2012	Guy Williams, On the Verge of Nothing	Tom Furniss, The Free Ice Cream Show; Tevita Manukia, Knock Knock; Rose Matafeo, Scout's Honour; TJ McDonald, My Life Has Been a Series of Poorly Made Decisions
2013	Rose Matafeo, The Rose Matafeo Variety Hour	Pax Assadi, Pax's Magic Carpet Ride; Tom Furniss, The Diary of Gordon Leaf-Cooper; Eli Matthewson, Proposition: Great! Joseph Moore, Dope Ass Jokes
2014	Guy Montgomery, Presents a Succinct and Concise Summary of How He Feels About Certain Things	Tim Batt, Tim Batt Saves Planet Earth; Brendon Green, Some More Mr Nice Guy; Jamaine Ross, Jamaine Says Funny Things; Stephen Witt, ODD
2015	Hamish Parkinson, Fly or Die	Tim Batt, Tim Batt In the Human Experience; Eli Matthewson, Faith; Nic Sampson, National Treasure; Matt Stellingwerf, PsychoBabble
2016	David Correos, Second Place Winner	Alice Brine, Brinestorm; Laura Daniel, Pressure Makes Diamonds; James Malcolm, Marry Me Chris Warner; Matt Stellingwerf, Bachelor of Arts
2017	Angella Dravid, Down the Rabbit Hole	Li'i Alaimoana, Minority Rapport; Patch Lambert, Terrordactyl; Ray O'Leary, A Pessimist's Guide to Optimism; Paul Williams, Summer Time Love
2018	Melanie Bracewell, Melodrama	Donna Brookbanks, You Do You Babes; James Malcolm, Fameless; Alice Snedden, Self Titled: Vol. II; Two Hearts (Laura Daniel & Joseph Moore), Two Hearts
2019	Kura Forrester, Kura Shoulda Woulda	Donna Brookbanks, Heroic; James Mustapic, The Blair Witch Projector; Ray Shipley, All This Crying Is Making Me Hungry; Tom Sainsbury, Tom Foolery
2020	No award — festival cancelled	Josh Davies, Look! I'm Blind; James Mustapic, James Mustapic Is Coming Out (From Under a Rock); Ray O'Leary, Ray Against the Machine; Brynley Stent, Soft Carnage; Lana Walters, Problem Areas
2021	Brynley Stent, Soft Carnage	James Mustapic, Inside James Mustapic; Josh Davies, Look! I'm Blind; Lana Walters, Problem Areas
2023	Abby Howells, La Soupco	Gabby Anderson, Bad-ish Teacher; Jack Ansett, Are You Taking The Piss? Janaye Henry, Crush Season; Maria Williams, ADHD... The Musical!?!
2024	Lana Walters, Don't Lick That	Advait Kirtikar, New Show, Who Dis? Rhiannon McCall, Toxic Shock Bimbo; Liv McKenzie, Crybaby; Tough Tiger Fist, Star-Crossed Brothers
2025	Hoani Hotene, It’s Getting Hotene, So Tell Me All Your Jokes	David Stuart, The Immortal Legacy of Me; Itay Dom, Itay Phone Home; Lesa MacLeod-Whiting, Rebellina; Booth the Clown/Jak Darling, Delightfool
2026	Joel Vinsen, Renaissance Man	Kipling DC, Skuxx Cowboys Get Lonely Sometimes Too; Samantha Hannah, Peekaboo! Opeti Vaka, I Love My Mum; Henry Yan, Mum Wants A Girlfriend (For Me?)

== Controversy ==
In 2003, Mike Loder was blacklisted from the 2004 festival after sending fake congratulatory letters to nominees Sully O’Sullivan and Penny Ashton. In 2005, Philip Patston, the 1999 winner who is gay and disabled, volunteered to give up his award in response to the rhetoric and policies of the National Party under Don Brash.

== Trivia ==
- Rhys Mathewson is the youngest recipient of the award at age 19.
- Benjamin Crellin (2000–03) and Jamie Bowen (2002–04, 2007) share the record for most nominations (four).
