= Jack Ansett =

New Zealand comedian

- Ansett in 2026
- Born: May 10, 1998 (age 28); Christchurch, New Zealand
- Occupation: Comedian
- Known for: 7 Days; Taskmaster NZ
- Awards: Sydney Comedy Festival Best Newcomer Award (2025)

Comedy career
- Years active: 2013–present
- Medium: Television; stand-up

Jack Ansett (born 1998) is a New Zealand comedian and writer. Ansett has written for and appeared on various television panel shows such as 7 Days and Taskmaster New Zealand, and he won the Sydney Comedy Festival's Best Newcomer Award in 2025.

== Early life ==
Ansett attended Burnside High School in Burnside, Christchurch, New Zealand. During this time, Ansett began performing stand-up; he was encouraged to pursue comedy by comedian Derek Flores. After Ansett completed high school in 2017, he moved to Auckland.

== Career ==
Ansett has been a writer for television shows 7 Days and the New Zealand version of Have You Been Paying Attention?. He has also appeared on Seven Sharp and The Project.

Ansett was a finalist for the Billy T Award for his show Are You Taking The Piss? in 2023. In 2024, he and Itay Dom performed New Jokes in Whangārei.

He was a contestant on Guy Montgomery's Guy Mont-Spelling Bee and he appears in the sixth series of Taskmaster New Zealand, aired in 2025.

Ansett won the Best Newcomer Award at the Sydney Comedy Festival for his stand-up show What's Everyone Having for Dinner? in 2025; he also performed the show at the Melbourne International Comedy Festival. The same year, he performed the show Joke Warehouse with Liv Mckenzie and Angella Dravid.

As of 2025, Ansett is repped by Karen Kay Management.
