= Brendhan Lovegrove =

New Zealand-based comedian and public speaker

- Born: 1971 (age 54–55)
- Occupation: Comedian
- Years active: 1990s–present

Brendhan Lovegrove (born 1971) is a Swiss-born New Zealand comedian. He is known for his performances on the New Zealand comedy circuit, as well as his roles on TV2's Pulp Comedy and TVNZ's A Night at the Classic.

== Early and personal life ==
Lovegrove was born in 1971 in Switzerland. He moved to New Zealand as a young child, where he grew up and is based. He also lived in Australia in the mid-2000s for a period. Lovegrove attended Dilworth School, a boarding school.

== Career ==
After winning the Billy T Award in 1998, Lovegrove travelled and performed at international comedy festivals including Scotland, Canada and England. Lovegrove joined the UK comedy circuit in 2000, and in his first year played 300 clubs. Lovegrove has since performed at clubs like Jongleurs, The Comedy Store, The Glee Club and Up the Creek.

Between 2006 and 2007, he worked alongside Kevin Black on the Solid Gold FM breakfast show. In 2010 he starred in TVNZ's A Night at the Classic, which returned for a second season in 2012.

== Notable performances ==
Lovegrove received critical acclaim for 'The Brendhan Lovegrove Project,' which was performed during the 2006 New Zealand International Comedy Festival. This was followed with 'The Emperor's New Show' during the 2007 New Zealand International Comedy Festival. Lovegrove was a performer at The Sydney Cracker Comedy Festival in 2006, London’s Comedy Store, and was featured in two episodes of UK TV’s 'Live at Jongleurs'.

Lovegrove hosted the final series of TV2's Pulp Comedy and has also performed on Australia’s Rove Live.

== Awards ==
In 1998, Lovegrove received New Zealand's Billy T Award.

In 2006, he received the inaugural Fred Award for outstanding achievement in New Zealand comedy - the Best Show award, was named the best male comedian by the New Zealand Comedy Guild and was also honoured with the unofficial 'Most Offensive Gag Award'.

He has received the best male comedian award from the New Zealand Comedy Guild in 2006, 2007, 2008, 2009, 2010, 2011, 2012, 2014 and 2015 – a total of nine times.

Lovegrove received the Rielly Comedy Award from the Variety Artists Club of New Zealand in 2012.

In 2013, Lovegrove won best international act at the Jakarta International Comedy Festival.
