= Taskmaster New Zealand =

New Zealand comedy panel game show

- Also known as: Taskmaster; Taskmaster NZ
- Genre: Comedy panel game
- Created by: Alex Horne
- Based on: Taskmaster by Alex Horne
- Written by: Sam Smith; Joseph Moore; Paul Williams
- Directed by: Andy Robinson & Tom Furniss
- Presented by: Jeremy Wells
- Starring: Paul Williams (assistant)
- Theme music composer: The Horne Section
- Country of origin: New Zealand
- Original language: English
- No. of series: 7
- No. of episodes: 70

Production
- Executive producers: Bronwyn Bakker; Cameron Bakker; Richard Allen-Turner; James Taylor; Jon Thoday; Rob Aslett; Andy Devonshire; Alex Horne
- Editors: Ben Winter; Luke Earl
- Running time: 44 minutes
- Production companies: Kevin & Co.; Avalon Television

Original release
- Network: TVNZ 2
- Release: 21 October 2020 – present

Related
- Taskmaster (British TV series); Taskmaster Australia

Taskmaster New Zealand (also known as Taskmaster or Taskmaster NZ especially prior to season 4) is a New Zealand comedy panel game show, first broadcast in 2020 on TVNZ 2. The format for the show was created by British comedian Alex Horne during the Edinburgh Festival Fringe in 2010 and was subsequently developed into a successful UK television show in 2015.

Following the format of the original British version, the show consists of five contestants who compete in a series of strange and unusual tasks to gain points from the Taskmaster, Jeremy Wells, administered by his assistant, comedian Paul Williams.

Taskmaster New Zealand is produced for TVNZ with support from NZ On Air. The first series was broadcast in March 2020, and a new series has been released during each calendar year through series six in 2025. The show's seventh season, featuring David Fane, Hoani Hotene, Morgana O'Reilly, Rhys Mathewson, and Rose Matafeo, was announced in November 2025 and premiered on 14 September 2026.

== Cast ==
In the studio, other than while attempting the live task, the contestants sit on a row of chairs in alphabetical order of forename from left to right.
Key

- * Season champion

Series	Year	Seating				
Series	Year	1st	2nd	3rd	4th	5th
1	2020	Angella Dravid *	Brynley Stent	Guy Williams	Leigh Hart	Madeleine Sami
2	2021	David Correos	Guy Montgomery	Laura Daniel *	Matt Heath	Urzila Carlson
3	2022	Chris Parker	Josh Thomson *	Justine Smith	Kura Forrester	Paul Ego
4	2023	Bubbah	Dai Henwood	Karen O'Leary	Melanie Bracewell *	Ray O'Leary
5	2024	Abby Howells	Ben Hurley	Hayley Sproull *	Tofiga Fepuleaʻi	Tom Sainsbury
6	2025	Alice Snedden	Bree Tomasel	Jack Ansett	Jackie van Beek *	Pax Assadi
7	2026	David Fane	Hoani Hotene	Morgana O'Reilly	Rhys Mathewson	Rose Matafeo *

== Episodes ==
Series	Episodes	Originally released	
Series	Episodes	First released	Last released
1	10	21 October 2020	23 December 2020
2	10	7 July 2021	8 September 2021
3	10	6 July 2022	7 September 2022
4	10	14 August 2023	12 September 2023
5	10	6 August 2024	4 September 2024
6	10	18 August 2025	16 September 2025
7	10	14 September 2026	13 October 2026

=== Series 1 (2020) ===
The filming of the tasks was completed in March 2020, just before the COVID-19 pandemic caused a nationwide lockdown. The contestants were Angella Dravid, Brynley Stent, Guy Williams, Leigh Hart, and Madeleine Sami. Dravid was the overall winner of the series, with Sami in second, Stent in third, Hart in fourth, and Williams in last place.

For team tasks, the team of three was made up of Stent, Williams and Sami, with the team of two consisting of Dravid and Hart.

Greg Davies, the host of the original British version of Taskmaster, appeared as part of the prize task in the seventh episode.

No.	Title	Winner	Original release date	Viewership
1	"Gluten Free"	Brynley Stent	21 October 2020	N/A
2	"A Political Hotcake"	Madeleine Sami	28 October 2020	134,100
3	"D.A.P."	Brynley Stent	4 November 2020	N/A
4	"I'm Queer, I'm Here"	Guy Williams	11 November 2020	N/A
5	"Unhealth Must Be Dead"	Brynley Stent	18 November 2020	N/A
6	"The Problem Is Me"	Angella Dravid	25 November 2020	129,000
7	"An Intervention"	Leigh Hart	2 December 2020	N/A
8	"Sweaty Socks and Depression"	Angella Dravid	9 December 2020	108,100
9	"Astro Blasters"	Leigh Hart	16 December 2020	106,400
10	"My Uncle John"	Madeleine Sami	23 December 2020	N/A

=== Series 2 (2021) ===
On 30 May 2021, the contestants for series 2 were named as David Correos, Guy Montgomery, Laura Daniel, Matt Heath, and Urzila Carlson. Daniel was the overall winner of the series, with Montgomery as the runner-up, while Correos placed third, Heath placed fourth, and Carlson finished last.

For team tasks, the team of three was made up of Correos, Montgomery and Daniel, with the team of two consisting of Heath and Carlson.

Unlike the first series, ratings were reported in four-week averages rather than individually - and in consolidated ratings as opposed to overnights - but the series' audience generally improved throughout, from an average of 113,800 for the first four episodes, to an average of 165,800 for the last four episodes. The tenth and final episode, alone, received 187,700 viewers.

Series 1 contestant Angella Dravid cameoed in the tenth and final episode, as part of a task. MP Chlöe Swarbrick also appears during the first episode as part of the prize tasks.

No.	Title	Winner	Original release date
1	"Flight of Fantasy"	Matt Heath	7 July 2021
2	"Heat Stroke"	Laura Daniel	14 July 2021
3	"At Your Service"	David Correos	21 July 2021
4	"Unbung"	Guy Montgomery	28 July 2021
5	"Feel My Bean"	Urzila Carlson	4 August 2021
6	"Eat Your Asses"	Guy Montgomery	11 August 2021
7	"Completing the Set"	Laura Daniel	18 August 2021
8	"Judgement Day"	Guy Montgomery	25 August 2021
9	"Bing Bang Schlong"	Matt Heath	1 September 2021
10	"A Good Time, Not a Fast Time"	David Correos	8 September 2021

=== Series 3 (2022) ===
Funding from NZ On Air for a ten-episode third series was announced in April 2022, having been received months earlier. The tasks were written in February 2022. Filming for the studio shows took place in the last week of May.

The contestants for the series were announced in June 2022 as Chris Parker, Josh Thomson, Justine Smith, Kura Forrester and Paul Ego. The series premiered on 6 July 2022; in the run-up to the series, series 1 and 2 were repeated on TVNZ Duke across the two weekends before its launch. Thomson was the overall winner of the series, with Parker as the runner-up, while Forrester placed third, Ego placed fourth, and Smith finished last.

For team tasks, the team of three was made up of Thomson, Smith and Forrester, with the team of two consisting of Parker and Ego.

The series launch recorded 145,400 viewers in consolidated viewing figures.

Series 2 contestant and writer for the show (from this series onwards) David Correos cameoed in the seventh episode as part of a task, as did athlete Eliza McCartney as part of the prize task. Drag queen Edward Cowley, series 4 contestant Ray O'Leary, and series 6 contestant Bree Tomasel make appearances in the eighth episode as part of a task.

No.	Title	Winner	Original release date
1	"F**k Golf"	Josh Thomson	6 July 2022
2	"Sauce Tits"	Josh Thomson	13 July 2022
3	"Mexican Lasagna"	Paul Ego	20 July 2022
4	"Herbs and Spices"	Chris Parker	27 July 2022
5	"The Prime Minister Thanks You"	Kura Forrester	3 August 2022
6	"Sweet Navel Orange"	Chris Parker	10 August 2022
7	"Butt Heavy"	Chris Parker	17 August 2022
8	"Best Friends"	Chris Parker	24 August 2022
9	"Well Alright!"	Chris Parker	31 August 2022
10	"Wet Ass Cutlery"	Josh Thomson	7 September 2022

=== Series 4 (2023) ===
Funding for a fourth series was confirmed in December 2022. At the time, writer Sam Smith said he had already written at least some of the tasks for the series.

The cast was revealed on 27 May 2023, as Bubbah, Dai Henwood, Karen O'Leary, Melanie Bracewell and Ray O'Leary. Ray O'Leary previously appeared on the show as part of a studio task during the third series. Bracewell was the overall winner of the series, with Bubbah as the runner-up, while Ray O'Leary placed third, Henwood placed fourth, and Karen O'Leary finished last.

For team tasks, the team of three was made up of Bubbah, Henwood and Karen O'Leary, with the team of two consisting of Bracewell and Ray O'Leary.

Studio filming began on 31 May and lasted a week. It was confirmed on 1 August that the series would premiere on 14 August, with two episodes broadcast weekly.

Alex Horne made a cameo in the introduction to the third episode, with the voices of previous contestants Guy Williams, Guy Montgomery and Josh Thomson appearing together in one of the episode's tasks. Thomson also was the director for some location tasks. Series 2 contestant Matt Heath made an indirect cameo via a task attempt in the eighth episode.

Episodes aired at an earlier timeslot compared to preceding seasons to compete with Three's The Traitors NZ. The first two episodes achieved an average audience of 157,800 viewers in consolidated viewing figures, with the second set of episodes (the third and fourth) averaging approximately 152,200 viewers, the third week of episodes (the fifth and the sixth) averaging approximately 173,000 viewers, the fourth week (episodes seven and eight) averaging approximately 163,900, and the final (episodes nine and ten) averaging 178,300. Viewership for individual episodes is unavailable due to the unique way television ratings are reported.

Previous contestants Matt Heath, Brynley Stent, and Josh Thomson joined regular task writers Joseph Moore, Sam Smith, and Paul Williams; Thomson also directed.

No.	Title	Winner	Original release date
1	"A Love Bomb"	Melanie Bracewell	14 August 2023
2	"I'm a Therapist, Not a Greengrocer"	Dai Henwood	15 August 2023
3	"Everyone Is Just a Teal Dress"	Melanie Bracewell	21 August 2023
4	"More Licky Licky"	Karen O'Leary	22 August 2023
5	"Your Hand Can Do a Better Job"	Karen O'Leary	28 August 2023
6	"There Had to Be Blood"	Melanie Bracewell	29 August 2023
7	"A Pretty Skux Cartwheel"	Bubbah	4 September 2023
8	"Steroids and Cigarettes"	Ray O'Leary	5 September 2023
9	"Truffle Pig"	Bubbah	11 September 2023
10	"Where Is Scorpio?"	Melanie Bracewell	12 September 2023

=== Series 5 (2024) ===
The show's recommission for a fifth series was confirmed in November 2023. Studio filming took place between 4 and 8 June 2024.

The cast was revealed on 20 July 2024, as Abby Howells, Ben Hurley, Hayley Sproull, Tofiga Fepuleaʻi, and Tom Sainsbury. The series started airing on 6 August 2024, again with two episodes broadcast weekly at the same time slot as the season prior, and ended on 4 September 2024 with the 10th episode. Sproull was the overall winner of the series, with Hurley as the runner-up, while Sainsbury placed third, Fepulea'i placed fourth, and Howells finished last.

For team tasks, the team of three was made up of Howells, Fepulea'i and Sainsbury, with the team of two consisting of Hurley and Sproull.

The first two episodes achieved an average audience of 163,600 viewers in consolidated viewing figures, with the second week of episodes averaging approx. 154,000 viewers. The third week of episodes averaged approx. 135,100 viewers, with the fourth week averaging approx. 154,100 viewers, and the final, fifth week averaging 145,600 viewers. Viewership for individual episodes is unavailable due to the unique way television ratings are reported.

As Fepulea'i was ill during the studio record, various previous contestants returned to represent him and conduct the prize and live tasks on his behalf. For episodes 1 and 2, Season 1 contestant Madeleine Sami returned; for episodes 3 and 4, Season 2 contestant Matt Heath; for episodes 5 and 6, Season 3 winner Josh Thomson; for episodes 7 and 8, Season 4 contestant Bubbah; and for episodes 9 and 10, Season 3 contestant Chris Parker. Bubbah also made an appearance in a pre-filmed task in the tenth episode.

Tasks were written by Tom Furniss, Joseph Moore, Ray O'Leary, Sam Smith, Joshua Thompson, Josh Thomson, and Paul Williams. Thomson was series director.

No.	Title	Winner	Original release date
1	"A Long Denouement"	Abby Howells	6 August 2024
2	"Slightly Sucked Pasta"	Abby Howells	7 August 2024
3	"The Lamp Left Me on Read"	Tom Sainsbury	13 August 2024
4	"Having a Flare-Up"	Ben Hurley	14 August 2024
5	"A Marvellous Tool"	Hayley Sproull	20 August 2024
6	"The One Where Rachel Dies in Childbirth"	Tofiga Fepulea'i	21 August 2024
7	"Sierra Echo Xylophone"	Tom Sainsbury	27 August 2024
8	"A Genie Comes If You Rub It"	Ben Hurley	28 August 2024
9	"An Absolute Pedant"	Abby Howells	3 September 2024
10	"Oh Baby It's Elegance"	Tofiga Fepulea'i	4 September 2024

=== Series 6 (2025) ===
A sixth series was confirmed in November 2024. Studio filming took place between 22 and 26 June 2025.

The cast was revealed on 30 July 2025, as Alice Snedden, Bree Tomasel, Jack Ansett, Jackie van Beek, and Pax Assadi. The series started airing on 18 August 2025, again with two episodes broadcast weekly at the same time slot as the season prior, and ended on 16 September 2025 with the 10th episode. Van Beek was the overall winner of the series, with Ansett as the runner-up, while Tomasel placed third, Snedden placed fourth, and Assadi finished last.

For team tasks, the team of three was made up of Ansett, van Beek, and Assadi, with the team of two consisting of Snedden and Tomasel.

Tasks for series 6 were written by Abby Howells, Josh Thomson, and Paul Williams; Rhys Mathewson, Robbie Nicol, and Williams were script writers. Thomson returned as series director.

Series 9 UK Taskmaster contestant and host of Junior Taskmaster Rose Matafeo made a cameo appearance in episode 8. Additionally, series 1 contestants Brynley Stent and Madeleine Sami, series 2 contestants Matt Heath and David Correos, and series 3 contestant Paul Ego all had voice cameos as part of a task in episode 9; Josh Thomson made a cameo appearance as part of the same task. Taskmaster Australia assistant Tom Cashman makes a cameo appearance in the intro of episode 10.

This series featured on-location tasks filmed at Rainbow's End.

The first two episodes achieved an average audience of 167,900 viewers in consolidated viewing figures. Viewership for individual episodes is unavailable due to the unique way television ratings are reported.

No.	Title	Winner	Original release date
1	"It's Like a Make a Wish"	Alice Snedden	18 August 2025
2	"Toxic Sexual Energy"	Jackie van Beek	19 August 2025
3	"Get Out of My Box"	Alice Snedden	25 August 2025
4	"Who Knows Who I Am?"	Bree Tomasel	26 August 2025
5	"Two Guys on a Mop"	Bree Tomasel	1 September 2025
6	"A Duck Archery Fanatic"	Alice Snedden	2 September 2025
7	"Community Hip-Hop"	Jackie van Beek	8 September 2025
8	"Hoisted on a Petard"	Jack Ansett	9 September 2025
9	"Comfortable in Your Own Skin"	Jackie van Beek	15 September 2025
10	"Seen as Sneaky"	Jack Ansett	16 September 2025

=== Series 7 (2026) ===
The seventh series premiered on 14 September 2026, with the cast confirmed in late August: David Fane, Hoani Hotene, Morgana O'Reilly, Rhys Mathewson, and Rose Matafeo. Matafeo was the overall winner of the series, with Mathewson placed second, Hotene third, O'Reilly fourth, and Fane last.

For team tasks, the team of three was made up of Hotene, O'Reilly, and Mathewson, with the team of two consisting of Fane and Matafeo.

This series featured on-location tasks filmed at the Museum of Transport and Technology.

No.	Title	Winner	Original release date
1	"Stuck in a Dictator Train"	Rhys Mathewson	14 September 2026
2	"And Then the Pālagi's Got Involved"	Morgana O'Reilly	15 September 2026
3	"Rodney"	Rhys Mathewson	21 September 2026
4	"The Jazz Hands"	Rose Matafeo	22 September 2026
5	"Rhys Lightning"	Morgana O'Reilly	28 September 2026
6	"A Fan of Bigotry"	Morgana O'Reilly	29 September 2026
7	"That One Wasn't a Character"	Rose Matafeo	5 October 2026
8	"Two-Ply"	Hoani Hotene	6 October 2026
9	"Womansplaining Animal Facts"	Hoani Hotene	12 October 2026
10	"A New Way of Seeing the World"	Rose Matafeo	13 October 2026

== Production ==
Funding from NZ On Air for the first series was announced in September 2019. Pre-recorded tasks are filmed at a mansion in North Auckland referred to as the "Taskmaster House" or "Taskmaster Ranch", which is actually a boutique events venue marketed under the name "HUs", situated between the communities of Riverhead and Coatesville to the north-west of Auckland, adjacent to Riverhead Forest. The same venue is used for tasks in Taskmaster Australia. Pre-recorded tasks during season 6 are also filmed at Rainbow's End theme park.

Prior to the filming of the studio shows for the first series, a "warm-up episode" was shot with no studio audience – internally called "Episode Zero" – that allowed Wells and Williams to practice their roles, featuring some tasks that were going to be cut from the series proper. The studio shows were originally scheduled to film at South Pacific Pictures in Auckland in late August 2020, but were later cancelled – Auckland was moved into level 3 COVID-19 restrictions shortly beforehand – and were delayed into September. More relaxed measures were in place at time of filming, but mandated that Wells was spaced apart from the series' contestants in the studio, which Wells later remarked felt "pretty weird", and was an "unusual experience".

The second series was confirmed in March 2021, with the lineup confirmed that May. Pre-production took four weeks at the beginning of 2021, between writers Sam Smith and Williams, before moving from a studio onto Zoom after the February Auckland lockdown was put in place. During the series, to ensure contestants were unable to decipher, and thus prepare for, what a task could be prior to filming, tasks were given nicknames should they be written on call sheets. One task during the series was cut after Carlson broke her collarbone in an attempt to complete it.

Justine Smith, speaking of her experience filming the third series, noted that the entire process is very different to that of her other usual television appearances, and that "taking part in Taskmaster requires a different skill set"; she commented that it was "very secretive", with contestants not privy to witnessing tasks being set up and are unaware of "what's happening in advance". Smith recalled that she was "taken in – literally almost with a hood over [her] head – to a room [you're] not allowed to leave" before "[you] come out[,] do the task and go straight back into [your] room"; the lack of a reaction to the performance in a task troubled Smith, who commented "[y]ou turn around and walk away, [it being] a comedian's worst nightmare to not have someone tell you it was OK or laugh."

Coming up with tasks, writers Smith and Williams "abide by strict rules". Tasks have to be submitted to and approved by producers before being presented to contestants. One task from the first series ("Make the best desert") was almost cut from broadcast because all of the contestants misread it (as "Make the best dessert"), but Stent's reaction when she re-read the task and understood it properly – which Williams called one of "the season's best moments" – convinced the producers to retain it.

== Funding ==
Taskmaster New Zealand receives funding from NZ On Air for one season a year.

NZ On Air funding for Taskmaster
Season	Funding ($)	Ref.
1	734,953	
2	792,119	
3	886,574	
4	882,119	
5	935,059	
6	944,306	
7	990,231	

== Reception ==
=== Viewership ===
In a press release announcing the show's recommission, it was reported that the first series increased TVNZ 2's audience by 19% among 25-54s and more than doubled the channel's audience aged 15–34, "reach[ing] more people than any other local comedy series on air in 2020".

In consolidated viewership, the show - specifically its second series - was TVNZ2's tenth most popular show among adults aged 18–49 - the channel's target demographic - during the latter six months of 2021. In turn, for the year to March 2023, the show's third series was TVNZ2's fifth most popular show among that audience. The fourth series was TVNZ2's second most popular show in 2023 among 18-49s.

=== Critical response ===
The first episode received mixed to positive reviews from critics. James Croot of Stuff claimed the series was "off to a terrific start" and "you might just need to put an hour aside for the next few weeks", in contrast to comments of colleague Darren Bevan, who wrote that "while Taskmaster NZ hasn't romped away with a decisive victory, it has done enough to secure a technical win and an appointment for a second week's viewing". Bevan did offer praise, towards Paul Williams' role as the assistant, calling him "one of the show's MVPs before even 30 minutes of the first episode have passed". Stewart Sowman-Lund of The Spinoff agreed that Williams "is well-suited to the role" of the assistant. Sowman-Lund praised the first episode stating that "Taskmaster NZ starts high in the sky – and long may it continue." Karl Puschmann, writing for The New Zealand Herald did not give the show as favourable a review, stating that "it's okay. There's some good gags and it's great to see our comedians on screen. But still, it's not for me."

For the first episode of the second series, James Croot of Stuff – in contrast to his more positive comments regarding the first series – noted that, regarding the dynamic between Wells and Williams, "[t]he former still seems unsure of their relationship, the power dynamic less clear-cut than between the original's Greg Davies and Alex Horne", and that while some of the tasks "offer[ed] plenty of entertaining laughs", others were not "quite as successful". He concluded by admitting that "while Taskmaster NZ is trying to balance creating its own identity with maintaining the joy of the original, it's not always succeeding". The Spinoff's Stewart Sowman-Lund was more positive, praising the entire series as "truly hilarious", and that its contestants "will surely go down in the annals of Taskmaster history as one of the best casts the show has ever seen".

== Distribution ==
Taskmaster New Zealand was made available to stream in Sweden through SVT Play in December 2022 under the local name Bäst i test Nya Zeeland, is able to be viewed in Norway through Discovery+ (where it is called Kongen befaler New Zealand), and aired in the United Kingdom on Channel 4 starting 28 August 2023 with episodes subsequently made available on Channel 4's streaming service by the same name. The first six seasons are also available on the Taskmaster YouTube channel.

It is available for streaming on Taskmaster SuperMax+, a subscription streaming platform dedicated to hosting Taskmaster content able to be accessed internationally.
