= Ray O'Leary =

New Zealand comedian and actor

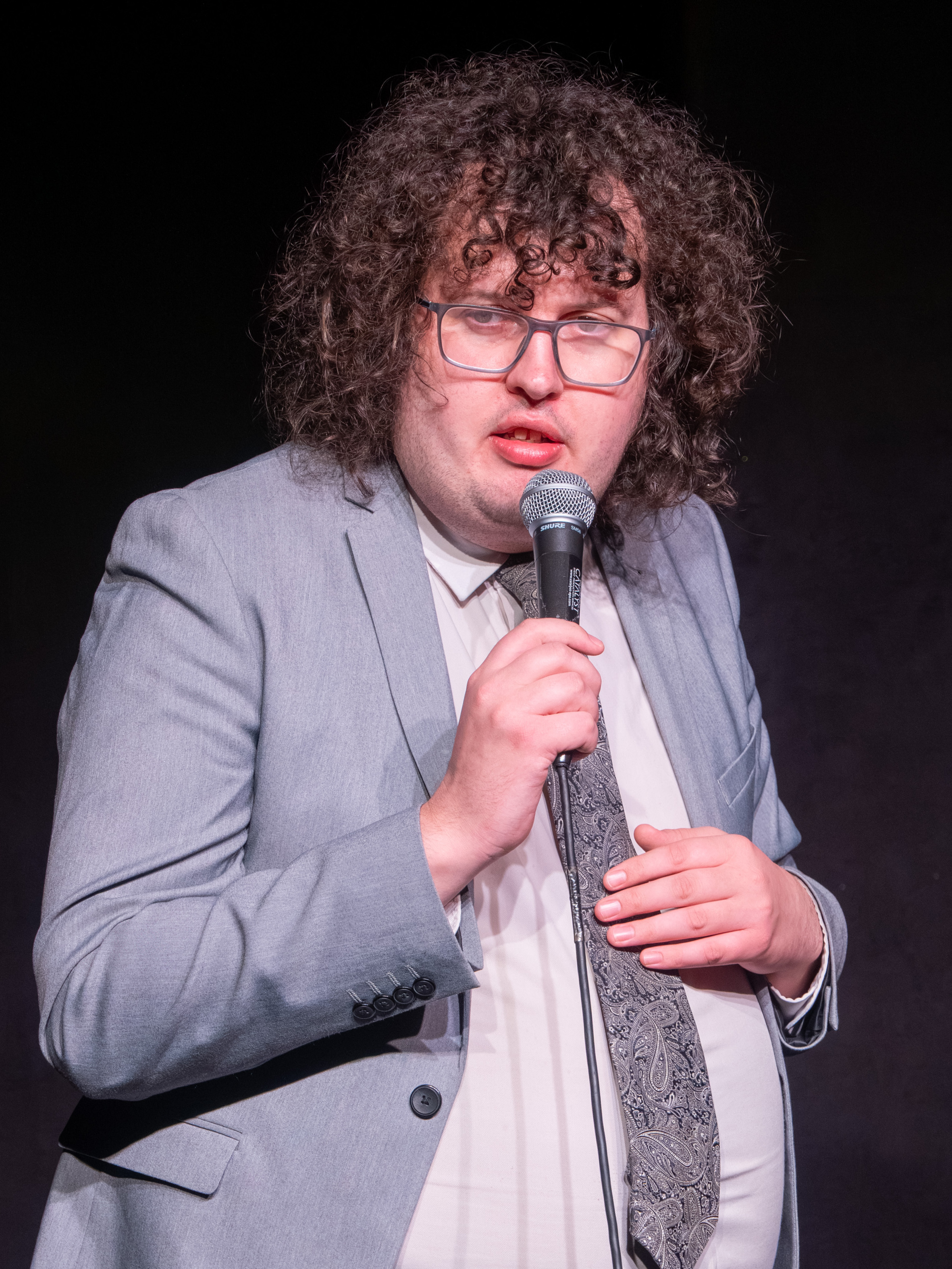
- O'Leary at the 2025 Edinburgh Festival Fringe
- Born: Matthew O'Leary; 1989 (age 36–37); Whanganui, New Zealand
- Education: Victoria University of Wellington (MPhil)
- Occupations: Comedian; actor

Comedy career
- Years active: 2015–present
- Medium: Television; stand-up
- Genres: Observational; deadpan

Matthew "Ray" O'Leary (born 1989) is a New Zealand comedian, TV personality, and actor, known for his deadpan humour and grey suit.

== Early life and education ==
O'Leary grew up in Whanganui, New Zealand, where he attended Cullinane College. He has a bachelor's and master's degree in philosophy from Victoria University of Wellington.

At university, O'Leary's friends gave him the nickname "Ray" because they thought he sounded like Ray Romano.

Peter Singer's 1975 book Animal Liberation convinced O’Leary to become vegan.

== Career ==
Tired of working as a public servant, O'Leary began performing stand-up comedy in 2015 in Wellington. By 2018, he was also writing for television shows. He has written for 7 Days.

O'Leary has appeared on various panel shows, including Have You Been Paying Attention?, The Cheap Seats, Guy Montgomery's Guy Mont-Spelling Bee, 7 Days and Patriot Brains. Other television programs O'Leary has been in include Thank God You're Here, Raised by Refugees, Golden Boy, and My Favourite Dead Person. Podcasts he has participated in include Waterdeep Mountain High and Socrates Walks into A Bar.

In 2018, O'Leary and Lucy Roche performed the show Young, Dumb and Full of Comedy. O'Leary presented his comedy show Everything Funny All the Time Always in 2023 across New Zealand and then at the Melbourne International Comedy Festival and the Sydney Comedy Festival.

He appeared in the fourth series of Taskmaster NZ in 2023. In 2024, he performed his show Your Laughter Is Just Making Me Stronger in Perth, Melbourne, Brisbane, Auckland, and Wellington.

Influences on O'Leary include Scott Aukerman, Nate Bargatze, Ellen DeGeneres, Stewart Lee, Norm Macdonald, Guy Montgomery, and Tig Notaro. Fans of O'Leary have been known to dress up as him at his shows.

O'Leary won Best Newcomer at the 2016 Wellington Comedy Awards, and was nominated for the Billy T Award in 2017, for his show A Pessimist's Guide to Optimism, and in 2020, for his show Ray Against the Machine.

As of 2024, O'Leary is repped by Jubilee Street Management.
