= Johanna Cosgrove =

New Zealand actor, comedian and writer (born 1990)

- Born: 1992
- Education: Toi Whakaari, Ecole Philippe Gaulier

Johanna Cosgrove (yoh-HAN-uh; born 1992) is a New Zealand actor, comedian and writer based in Auckland.

== Training and career ==
Cosgrove trained in performing arts at Toi Whakaari and trained as a clown at Ecole Philippe Gaulier in Paris.

Cosgrove hosted the 9th Annual Auckland Theatre Awards in 2017. In 2022 Cosgrove and Samuel Te Kani started a podcast Rats in the Gutter where they discuss art and pop culture. She made her television debut in the show, Madam in 2024.

She appeared in the third series of Guy Montgomery's Guy Mont-Spelling Bee in 2026.

=== Comedy shows ===
- AUNTY (2018) a solo show, received multiple accolades and toured internationally to sell-out crowds
- Hi, Delusion (2023)
- Iconoclasts (2024) was part of the NZ International Comedy Festival
- Sweetie (2025)

=== Publications ===
- Crying on the Phone (2022)
