= Viva La Dirt League =

New Zealand sketch comedy group

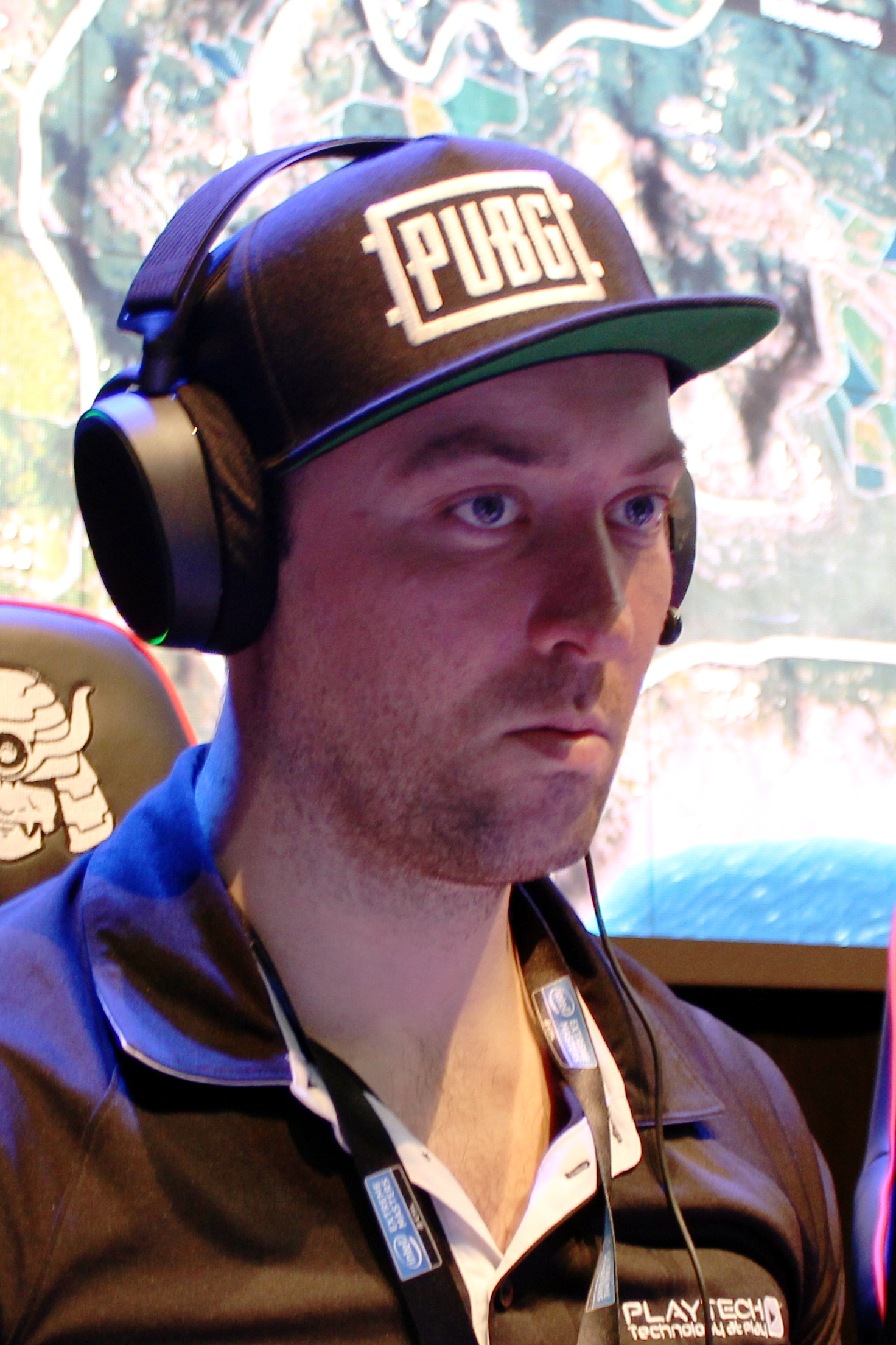
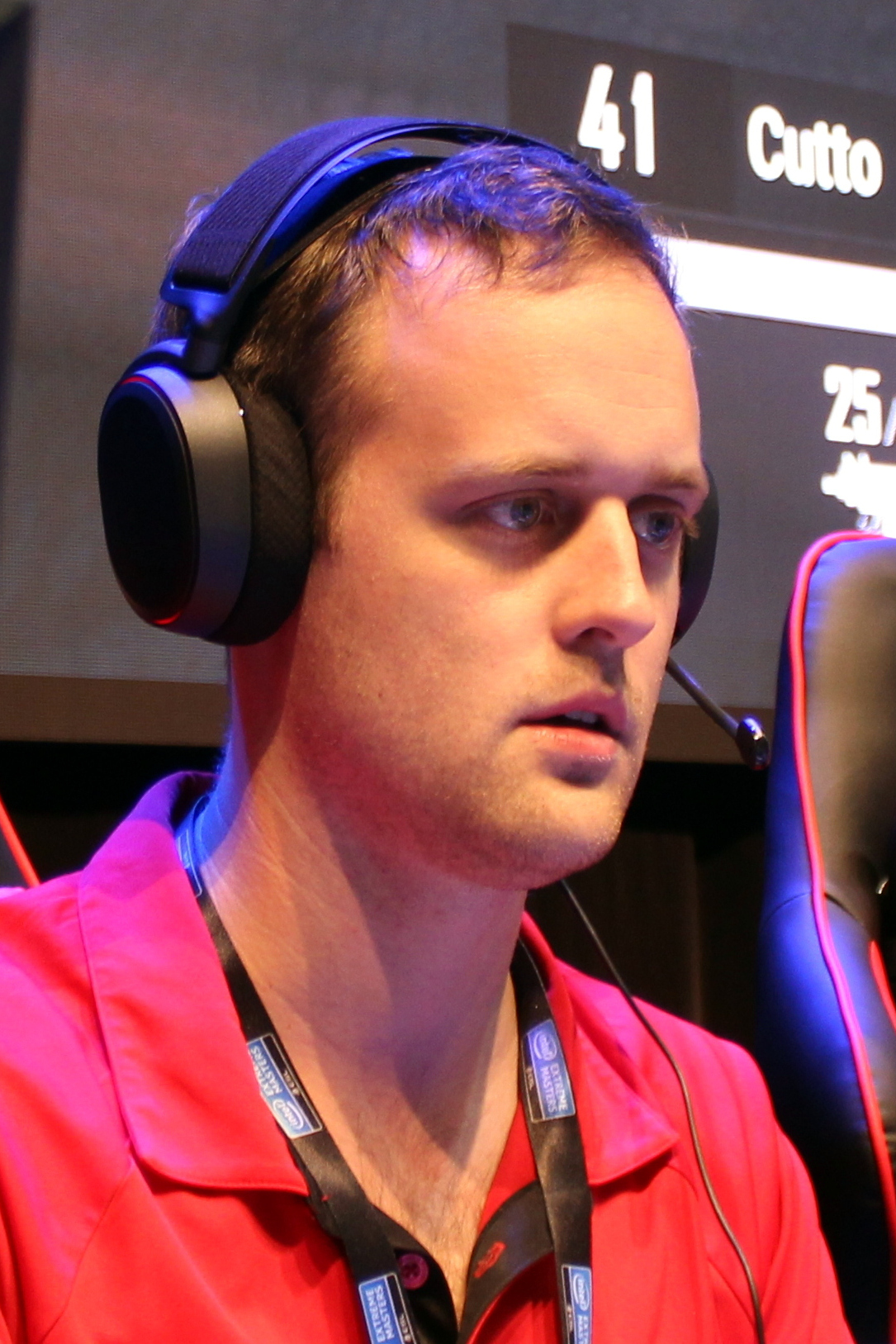
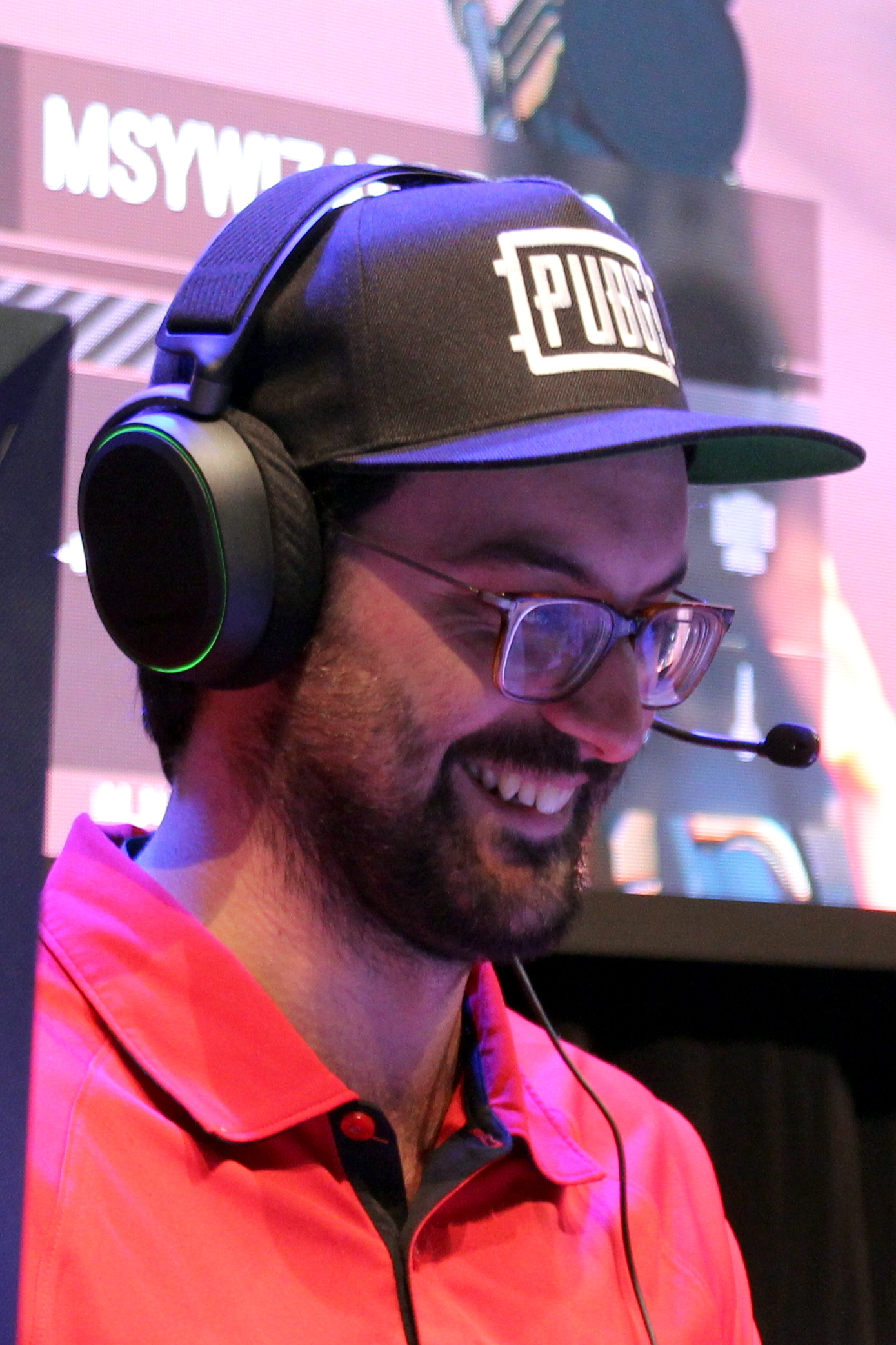
- Bettjeman, Morrison, and King in 2018
- Occupations: Sketch comedians and Production Company

YouTube information
- Channel: Viva La Dirt League
- Years active: 2011–present
- Genres: Comedy; Gamer Parody; Fantasy
- Subscribers: 7.49 million
- Views: 5.79 billion
- Last updated: 1 January 2026
- Website: vivaplus.tv

Viva La Dirt League (VLDL) is a sketch comedy troupe on YouTube and independent production company from New Zealand. The founding members and business owners are Rowan Bettjeman, Alan Morrison and Adam King.

Core cast members include Ben van Lier (actor and head writer), Britt Scott Clark, Ellie Harwood, Hamish Parkinson, Rhiannon McCall, Byron Coll, Phoenix Cross and Brynley Stent, as well as Robert Hartley for their D&D related content.

The extended cast includes Madeleine Adams, David Correos, Alison Quigan, John Leigh, Theo Shakes, Milo Cawthorne and Charisse Uy.

As of May 2026, their main YouTube channel has 7.49 million subscribers and 5.71 billion views and their D&D channel has 476 thousand subscribers and 85.1 million views.

== Background ==
Before forming VLDL, Bettjeman and Morrison's short Beached was selected for showing at the New Zealand International Film Festival in 2010. Bettjeman and Morrison present a weekly news media online clip show "Media Ocre Awards" for the WatchMe.co.nz. The group went full-time in 2017.

The group's sketches have been nominated for Streamy Awards. Fans of the group include English actor Andrew Koji. The group is represented by Creative Artists Agency.

== Series ==
=== PUBG Logic ===
PUBG Logic is set in an online multiplayer battle royale game (ostensibly PlayerUnknown's Battlegrounds). Characters are players' avatars and the comedy focuses on the bugs, gameplay limitations, and exploits in the game. Use of the PUBG imagery has been endorsed by the game's creators, and due to the popularity of the game, and the group's sketches, they have attended gaming conventions (Armageddon) and tournaments (League of Legends Pro League) to promote these characters. A supercut of the first season has reached over 17 million views on YouTube.

=== Epic NPC Man ===
Epic NPC Man is a sketch comedy set within "Skycraft", an entirely fictional fantasy MMORPG where non-player characters (NPCs) and players interact. Epic NPC Man deconstructs the in-universe logic of role playing games (RPGs), the mechanics of video games and the fantasy genre at large, typically spoofing real-life game franchises such as The Elder Scrolls, World of Warcraft, Baldur's Gate and The Witcher.

The series takes place in Azerim (a portmanteau of Azeroth and Skyrim), a sprawling medieval kingdom assailed by the neighbouring Orcish land of Shmargonrog. Initially, Epic NPC Man was presented almost exclusively from the perspective of Greg (Morrison), a lowly NPC, garlic farmer and quest-giver in the tranquil but unremarkable village of Honeywood, observing the confusing activities of players.

A core mechanic of the series and one of the characterising features of "Skycraft" are its sentient NPCs. In the tangentally-linked series DEV it is revealed that this sentience is the side effect of a developer being over-committed to improving the graphics of the game.

Many scenes have been filmed at Howick Historical Village.

==== Baelin's Route: An Epic NPC Man Adventure ====
In 2020, the group crowdfunded NZ$660,000 (c. €390,000) via Kickstarter to produce a short film set in the Epic NPC Man universe. Baelin's Route: An Epic NPC Man Adventure premiered on YouTube on 9 May 2021. The film, which was written by Morrison and directed by Morrison and King, stars Bettjeman as Baelin, a non-player character whose normal route, from home to fishing spot, is interrupted by a human player (Ben Van Lier) and a damsel in distress (Phoenix Cross) making him into a reluctant hero. It had over 900 thousand views within 24 hours of its release.

==== Hero Outage ====
In October 2024, an original eighty-page comic book titled Epic NPC Man: Hero Outage was co-produced by Viva la Dirt League and Bad Egg Publishing, written by Fred Van Lente and illustrated by Bailie Rosenlund. It features virtually every character from Epic NPC Man in a standalone story, wherein a server issue causes the "adventurers" of Azerim to vanish.

==== Nice Day for Fishing ====
Nice Day for Fishing was developed by studio FusionPlay and published for release by Team17 on 29 May 2025, for Steam, PlayStation, and Nintendo platforms. The 2D action RPG follows the NPC Baelin the Fisherman, who is changed into a playable character, aka an "Adventurer", as the player accepts quests from the various characters of the Epic NPC Man cast.

==== Mug 'Em ====
In mid-2025, a spin-off of Epic NPC Man premiered on Viva Plus entitled Mug 'Em. The series focuses on Charles (Bettjeman) and Bernard (Van Lier), a pair of dim-witted NPC muggers who audition new and often unsuccessful criminal activities.

=== Bored / TechTown ===
TechTown, previously known as Bored, is a series of sketches primarily based in a retail tech store. New Zealand Radio Award-winning presenter Ellie Harwood co-stars as an employee. The series originally took place within a PlayTech store (a real computer retail chain in New Zealand), although the sketches were created independently from the company. As of July 2023, the series is filmed and based in a fictional store called "TechTown" and is filmed in the Viva La Dirt League studio. As of 2025, the series was retroactively retitled TechTown.

=== Dev ===
Dev is a series made as of November 2024 showcasing the inner workings of the Dev team that created the fictional hit game "Skycraft" which Epic NPC Man is set in. Dev centers around the fictional studio "Arcticstorm", a pastiche of companies such as Activision Blizzard and Bethesda Softworks, satirising the business practices of the video game industry. In the series a newly hired community manager, Abby, witnesses the core team of Arcticstorm in their efforts to avariciously monetize their player base. Their tactics include promoting content they have little intention to produce and inflating the prices of in-game items, to varying success.

=== Witcher Logic ===
Witcher Logic is a serialized fantasy comedy series, a parody of the Witcher video games based on the fantasy novel series of the same title by Andrzej Sapkowski. Season one released weekly between April and May 2022 while season two released between March and April 2025. Bettjeman plays a dim-witted incarnation of Geralt of Rivia and Morrison plays his long-suffering companion Dandelion as they hunt monsters with varying success. Madeleine Adams stars as Yennefer. The series parodies the mechanics of the video games as well as the Witcher media franchise at large, including the live-action Netflix adaptation.

=== FPS Logic ===
FPS Logic is a miniseries, a parody of war-themed first-person shooter video games such as Call of Duty and Battlefield. Rowan Bettjeman stars as a player in the fictional FPS "War Battle", while Adam King and Alan Morrison play two NPC American soldiers. In a World War Two campaign, Bettjeman leads a secret mission to take out German anti-aircraft artillery, vexed by the poor AI of the NPCs, tedious plot and overall poor quality of the gameplay.

=== Red Dead Logic ===
Red Dead Logic is a series parodying the Red Dead video game series, particularly Red Dead Redemption 2 and Red Dead Online. The mechanics of the game series are parodied and deconstructed, such as the "dead eye" system which allows the player to seemingly slow the flow of time to improve their aim, as well as the AI of the game's NPCs. As of 2026, the compilation of season 2 has 2.6 million views.

== Viva La Dirt League D&D ==
Starting in July 2019, Viva released a short actual play series using Dungeons & Dragons where their Epic NPC Man characters adventured into Baldur's Gate: Descent into Avernus, with Robert Hartley as Dungeon Master. Building on its success, in March 2020, Viva launched their second YouTube channel focusing on Dungeons & Dragons and general tabletop role-playing game (TTRPG) content, with their main campaign "Adventures of Azerim" set in the world of "Skycraft" and shaping its lore.

In "Adventures of Azerim", King, Morrison and Bettjeman reprise their roles as Greg, Baradun and Bodger, and Van Lier debuts the character Bartholomew Osiris Bladesong (abbreviated as "Bob"). Hartley also returns as the Dungeon Master. The series featured a rotating cast and ran for five years, concluding with its 250th episode in September 2025.

In February 2024, Viva started a complementing campaign featuring Britt Scott Clark, Ellie Harwood, Phoenix Cross and Rhiannon McCall, called "Tales of the Misfits".

In October 2025, with "Adventures of Azerim" and "Tales of the Misfits" both ending previously, they started a new main campaign called "Into the Darklands". Hartley returned as Dungeon Master with players Adam King, Britt Scott Clark, Ben Van Lier and Brynley Stent debuting new characters.

Daggerheart: Azerim is an actual play collaboration between Viva La Dirt League and Critical Role Productions. The cast consists of Ben Van Lier, Adam King, Rowan Bettejeman, and Alan Morrison as players with Robert Hartley as the Game Master. It is set in the Azerim setting and features the Baradun and the Dickheads adventuring party. Unlike previous actual plays by the troupe, this show uses the Daggerheart system instead of Dungeons & Dragons. The show has a staggered release schedule across streaming platforms – it premiered on Beacon on 13 January 2026 and then was released on VIVA+ on 20 January 2026 and on YouTube on 27 January 2026.

== Studio ==
A Kickstarter campaign for a filming studio and office space for the company raised over US$2.5 Million in March 2022, with a location to be determined. In August, the Kickstarter campaign page (Update #38) and the VLDL YouTube channel updated with the news of the new studio location having been secured after a long search. The video shows a tour of the new, unrenovated facilities. The studio has been in operation since June 2023.
