= Orin Ruaine-Prattley =

Cook Islands footballer

- Born: Orin Moutira Ruaine-Prattley; 3 November 1997 (age 29); Palmerston North, New Zealand
- Education: Palmerston North Boys' High School; Massey University
- Occupations: Comedian; footballer

Orin Ruaine-Prattley
Personal information
- Full name: Orin Moutira Ruaine-Prattley
- Date of birth: 3 November 1997 (age 29)
- Place of birth: Palmerston North, New Zealand
- Positions: Defender; midfielder

Team information
- Current team: Alphington

Youth career
- Palmerston North Boys' High School

Senior career*
Years	Team	Apps	(Gls)
2013	YoungHeart Manawatu		
2018–2019	Miramar Rangers		
2020–2024	Brooklyn Northern United		
2024	Middle Park		
2025–	Alphington		

International career^{‡}
2016	Cook Islands U20	6	(0)
2022–	Cook Islands	9	(0)
- * Club domestic league appearances and goals as of 27 February 2026 ‡ National team caps and goals as of 27 February 2026

Orin Ruaine-Prattley (born 3 November 1997) is a New Zealand-born Cook Islands comedian and international footballer who plays for Waterside Karori AFC and the Cook Islands national football team.

Ruaine-Prattley grew up in Palmerston North. He initially pursued a sporting career, playing for the Cook Islands at the 2022 FIFA World Cup qualifiers, 2023 Pacific Games, 2026 FIFA World Cup qualifiers and the 2024 OFC Men's Nations Cup.

In 2019 Ruaine-Prattley was wrongly identified by Cook Island News and Radio New Zealand to have sued the Cook Islands Football Association for wrongful dismissal. The player in question was Bruce Akamoeau Bien, who was sacked from the under-20 team after going out to dinner with his family. Ruaine-Prattley had nothing to do with this event.

He branched out into standup comedy, winning a Best Newcomer award at the 2023 New Zealand International Comedy Festival. In 2022 he was awarded funding by Creative New Zealand to develop an act for the 2023 New Zealand Fringe Festival.

In 2026 he performed Orin Performs Performative Stand-Up Comedy at the 2026 Fringe and 2026 NZ International Comedy Festival.

== Football Career statistics ==
=== International ===
Cook Islands
Year	Apps	Goals
2022	1	0
2023	4	0
2024	4	0
Total	9	0

Statistics accurate as of match played 27 February 2026

== Awards ==
- 2021 Wellington RAW Comedy Quest
- Best Newcomer Wellington 2023
