= New Zealand International Comedy Festival =

Annual comedy festival in New Zealand

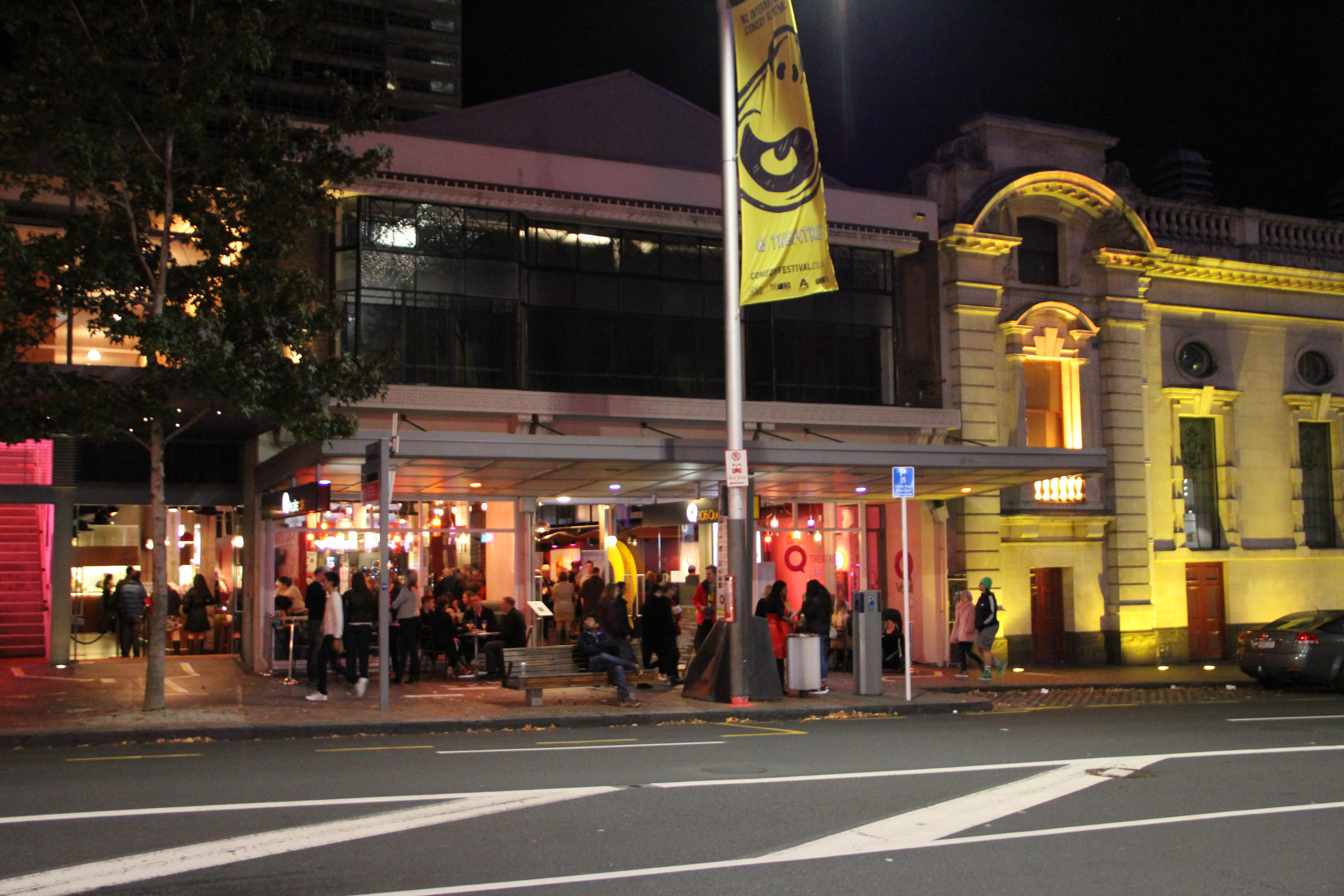
Taken outside of Q Theatre in Auckland, during the 2015 NZ International Comedy Festival.

The New Zealand International Comedy Festival (NZICF; sometimes the NZ Intl Comedy Fest) is a comedy festival in both Auckland and Wellington, New Zealand. The festival is run by the New Zealand Comedy Trust, and is held across three weeks during April and May. From its beginnings in 1993 as a 2-day event, the festival has developed into a major nationwide event, with a total attendance of over 100,000 people each year.

== Main events ==
Each year the Festival features over 200 shows and involves around 250 performers. The Festival contains a wide range of comedy performances – from emerging artists through to NZ comedy industry veterans and stars of the international comedy circuit.

Similarly, the Festival caters for a wide range of audiences with specific shows aimed at children and teenagers, and a diverse offering of comedy fare.

The opening of the Festival is the televised Comedy Gala, a showcase of performances by the top local and international comedians appearing in the festival. Past venues include St. James Theatre until 2008, and since then the Auckland Civic Theatre and ASB Theatre, Aotea Centre. Past hosts of the gala have included: Jeff Green, Ardal O'Hanlon, Arj Barker, Wayne Brady, Ed Byrne, Bill Bailey, Rove McManus, Greg Behrendt, Jeremy Corbett, Jason Byrne and Rhys Nicholson.

Alongside the large number of local and international shows, there are a number of events held annually such as the Class Comedians programme. This is an initiative set up to train talented high school students in the art of stand-up comedy and ends with a showcase at Q Theatre. Its most successful graduate is Rose Matafeo. The RAW rookie competition is also held every year, with the national finals at The Classic Comedy and Bar in Auckland.

=== Last Laughs! ===
To conclude the festival is the Last Laughs! awards showcase, held on the last Sunday. It is the last chance for the nominees for the Billy T Award and Fred Award to perform before the winners are announced at the end of the show. Other festival prizes awarded at Last Laughs include: Best International Show, Best Local Show, Best Newcomer, Best Marketing Campaign, and Spirit of the Festival.

Last Laughs! presentations and winners
Year	Host	Venue	Fred Award	Billy T Award	Auckland Newcomer(s)	Wellington Newcomer(s)	Director's Choice	Best Debut	Best International(s)
2026	Guy Montgomery	SkyCity Theatre	David Correos, Touching My Active Mind	Joel Vinsen, Renaissance Man	Sophie Stone, Winz Princess	Austin Harrison, F♠cking Ace	Elouise Eftos, Aphrodite		Hot Department, Amalgamation Elf Lyons, Swan
2025	Eli Matthewson	SkyCity Theatre	Angella Dravid, I'm Happy For You	Hoani Hotene, It's Getting Hotene, So Tell Me All Your Jokes	Sean Collier, Write-Off	Mo Munn, Is It Off? Liv Ward, EPIC WAY! I'm Gay? Oui oui faguette™ I LOVE KIM HILL (1999 version)	Johanna Cosgrove, SWEETIE		Elouise Eftos, Australia's First Attractive Comedian Rosco McClelland, Sudden Death
2024	Rhys Nicholson	SkyCity Theatre	Different Party (Barnie Duncan & Trygve Wakenshaw)	Lana Walters	Courtney Dawson	Samuel Gebreselassie	Rhys Mathewson		
2023	Chris Parker	SkyCity Theatre	Guy Montgomery, My Brain is Blowing Me Crazy	Abby Howells, La Soupco	Kura Turuwhenua	Orin Ruaine-Prattley	Liv Parker	Anthony Crum and Bailey Poching	
2021	Michèle A’Court	SkyCity Theatre	Eli Matthewson	Brynley Stent	Maria Williams	Tess Sullivan	Abby Howells, Jadwiga Green		
2019	Rhys Darby	SkyCity Theatre	James Nokise	Kura Forrester					
