= Benjamin Crellin =

Comedy career
- Medium: Stand-up actor writer

Benjamin Crellin is a New Zealand comedian, actor and writer.

== Comedy ==
He began his comedy career at 18 years old after attending the National Youth Drama School in the Hawkes Bay. He had originally signed up for an improv class but ended up attending a stand up class instead. Crellin is mostly known for his dark stand up that addresses social-political and taboo topics. He has been described as being “like a cross between Lenny Bruce and Dennis Leary with an angry smart guy vibe that is all his own".

Crellin received the maximum allowable amount of four nominations for the Billy T Award comedy award in 2000, 2001, 2002 and 2003. Crellin won "Best Artist Achievement 2004" at the New Zealand Comedy Awards. In 2009, Crellin won the 3rd edition of Radio New Zealand’s Stand up and be counted in which competitors were taken to a random location a few hours before the live show, then they wrote 6 minutes of comedy material based on the location. Also in 2009, Crellin was nominated for the New Zealand Comedy Guild Awards Andrew Kovacevich memorial cup.

Crellin co-authored his first book with Lee Baker entitled, Way Of The Jafa, a comprehensive guide to Auckland and Aucklanders. Published by Hachette New Zealand Ltd, in July 2004.

== TV appearances ==
Crellin has appeared on New Zealand Television, including four Billy T Award showcase performances in 2000, 2001, 2002 and 2003, as well as 7 episodes of Pulp Comedy and 6 appearances for The International Comedy Festival Gala. His gala routine in 2004 portrayed Paul Holmes as Gollum and was featured on the show Eating Media Lunch as one of the best media moments of 2004. In Europe Benjamin performed as a guest comedian on the Dutch television show Raymond is Laat.
