= Brynley Stent =

New Zealand actor, scriptwriter and comedian

- Born: Brynley Alexandra Stent; 24 June 1989 (age 37); Christchurch, New Zealand
- Education: Toi Whakaari
- Awards: Billy T Award (2021)

Comedy career
- Years active: 2014–present
- Medium: Television; theatre

Brynley Alexandra Stent (born 1989) is a New Zealand actor, comedian and scriptwriter. She appeared on the first season of the New Zealand adaptation of Taskmaster and played the character Kelly-Anne Johnson on long running New Zealand soap opera Shortland Street. She won the 2021 Billy T Award for best breakthrough comedian for her show Soft Carnage.

Stent studied drama at Toi Whakaari in Wellington, New Zealand, graduating in 2013 with a Bachelor of Performing Arts in Acting. She appeared as the recurring Gloriavale character Providence Gratitude in Three's Jono and Ben, alongside Rose Matafeo and Laura Daniel in Three's Funny Girls, in 2020 sitcom Golden Boy, and acts regularly on stage for Auckland Theatre Company.

Stent was a contestant on Series 1 of Taskmaster, which was broadcast on TVNZ 2 between 21 October 2020, and 23 December 2020; a total of 10 episodes. Stent came third overall at the end of the series.

In August 2021, it was announced that she would feature in Celebrity Treasure Island 2021 with her flatmate/contestant Chris Parker.

Stent appears regularly in videos for the Youtube channel Viva La Dirt League. She has appeared in the videos Surprise Replacement Boss, When Players Focus on the Wrong NPC, Assuming Someone's Pregnant and Managers Getting Aroused by their Power.

In 2023, Stent appeared on Guy Montgomery's Guy Mont-Spelling Bee.

In 2025, Stent released The SpinOff series on YouTube, Bryn & Ku's Singles Club, with Kura Forrester.
