= Abby Howells =

New Zealand comedian and actor

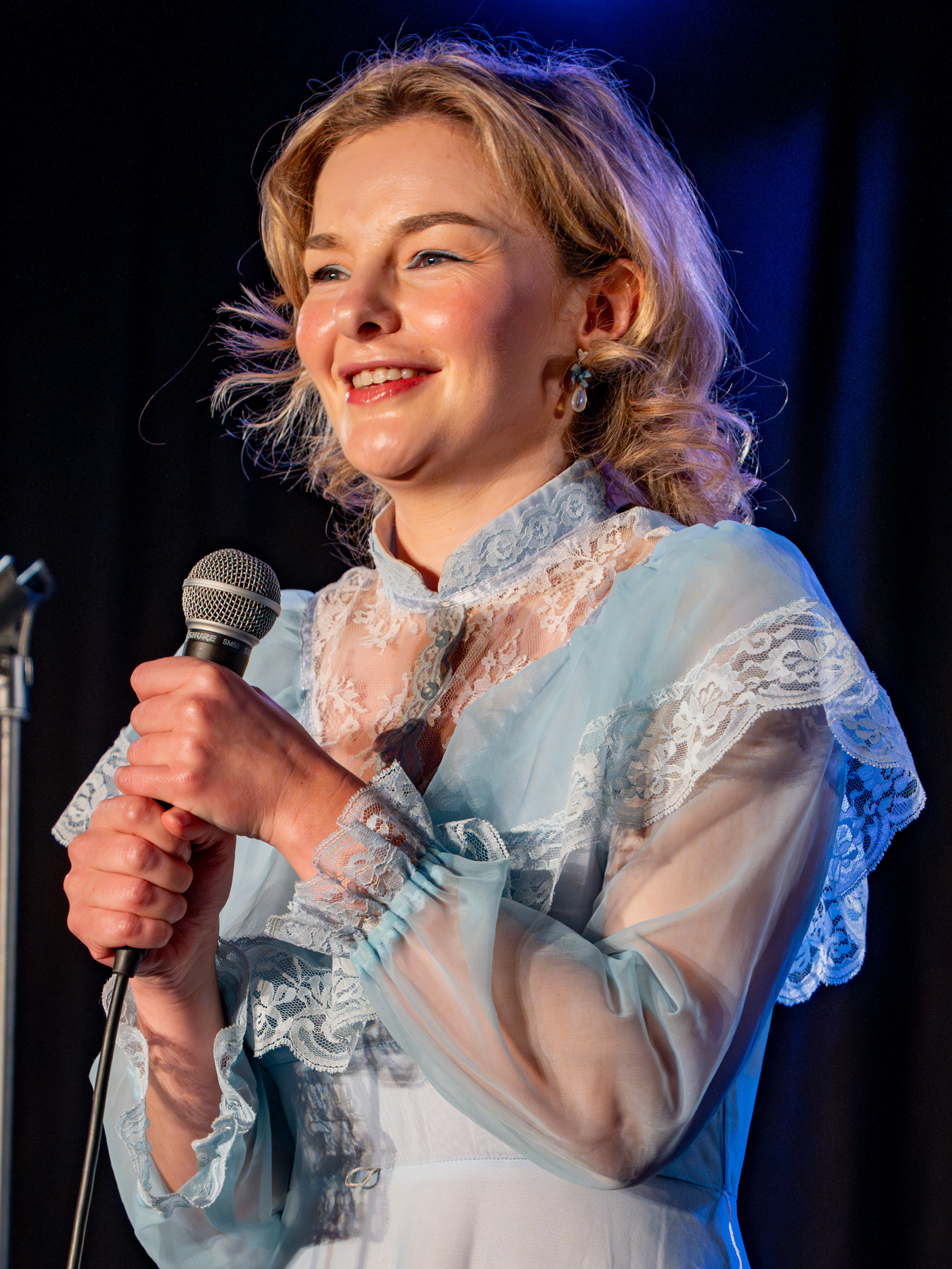
- Howells at the 2025 Edinburgh Festival Fringe
- Born: Abigail Mai Howells; 1990 or 1991 (age 35–36); Dunedin, New Zealand
- Education: University of Otago (BA, PhD); Victoria University of Wellington (MA)
- Awards: Billy T Award (2023)

Abigail Mai Howells is a New Zealand comedian, actor, and writer. She was the winner of the Billy T Award in 2023.

== Early life and education ==
Howells was born in and grew up in Dunedin, New Zealand. She attended an all-girls high school, where she acted in school productions of The Wizard of Oz as the Cowardly Lion and in Seussical as Horton the Elephant.

She received a bachelor of arts in film and media studies from the University of Otago, and a masters in creative writing (specifically screenwriting) from Victoria University of Wellington's International Institute of Modern Letters in 2014. At Victoria, she wrote the screenplay Standing Up, which won the Brad McGann Award.

Howells completed a PhD in theatre studies from the University of Otago; her thesis, titled "Performing Prison: How Is Life on the Inside Portrayed to the Outside World?", explored how incarcerated women are portrayed in film and television.

== Career ==
Howells was a founding member of Discharge, a female comedy collective. She served as head writer for the group, penning the shows What is This? Woman's Hour? (2012), Benedict Cumberbatch Must Die (2014), and 28 Days: A Period Piece (2015).

In 2014, Howells wrote Crossbow Cat, which won the Auckland Festival's Judges' Choice and People's Choice awards, and audio play The Crash in 2015, which aired on Radio New Zealand.

She presented her solo show Glocknid: Dwarf Warrior in 2014, which won the Best Newcomer Award at the 2015 Wellington International Comedy Festival. She portrayed Beatrix in Trick of the Light Theatre's Beards Beards Beards, which toured the United Kingdom, and her play Attila the Hun was part of the 2017 Young and Hungry Festival. In 2018 she performed White Men at the Dunedin Fringe Festival. Howells acted in Fold by Jo Randerson in 2018, and The Bald Soprano in 2019.

After starting stand-up in her 20s, Howells quit comedy for seven years following sexual harassment from another comedian and bad experiences with on-stage harassment; during this period she completed her PhD.

Howells's show HarleQueen, inspired by her experiences as a woman in comedy, won the Director's Award at the New Zealand International Comedy Festival in 2021; she also performed the show at Edinburgh Fringe. In 2023 at the NZICF, she wrote and performed La Soupco, which is "based on a screenplay Howells wrote when she was 11 years old ... a post-World War II nautical-themed romance set in Spain for little reason, where the characters don't have names". For the show, Howells won the Billy T Award. The New Zealand Herald wrote that La Soupco "strikes a wonderful balance between a theatrical concept and traditional stand-up".

In 2024, Howells and Angella Dravid formed an improv group called The Improfessionals and performed at the NZICF.

On television, Howells has appeared on 7 Days, Guy Montgomery's Guy Mont-Spelling Bee, Shortland Street, and Taskmaster New Zealand. She also acted in the Netflix film The Royal Treatment (2022). In the 2020s, she appeared in the episode "New Zealand" of the second season of Conan O'Brien Must Go, and was a writer on the sixth series of Taskmaster NZ and the third series of Guy Montgomery's Guy Mont-Spelling Bee (AU). She played the role of Isabelle in the 2026 television series New Zealand Spy.

Howells directed the second season of comedy podcast Did Titanic Sink?, hosted by Tim Batt and Carlo Ritchie. She has been a guest on Backyard Stories with Claudia Nankervis, No Such Thing as a Fish, and The Worst Idea of All Time.

She has cited Blackadder and Jerry Seinfeld as influences. As of 2024, Howells is represented by Token.

== Personal life ==
Howells is open about being autistic, explaining that "It takes the pressure off me a little bit. I can really relax and just be myself ... I don't have to process everything I do through a 'would a 'normal' person say this?' lens." She is interested in the Titanic disaster.

As of 2024, Howells is in a relationship with Robbie Nicol.
