= Turners Automotive Group =

- Traded as: NZX: TRA
- Key people: Todd Hunter (CEO)

Turners Automotive Group is a New Zealand automotive retail, finance and insurance company.

== History ==
Turners Automotive Group, then known as Turners Limited, was created in 2014 by the merging of retailer Turners Auctions and Dorchester Pacific, which deals with consumer insurance and finance.

In December 2023 Turners was added to the S&P NZX 50 and MidCap Index. Turners opened a Timaru dealership in March 2024.

== Marketing ==
Advertisements of Turners feature the character "Tina from Turners", who is played by stand-up comedian Sieni Leo'o Olo. In the advertisements she shouts out that she loves cars. Some Turners customers believe that Tina is a real employee, and request to have an appointment with her. Turners chief executive Greg Hedgepeth said that "the campaign and Tina have really helped put us on the map". A campaign cost $300,000 and was paid back in a month, which chief executive Todd Hunter described as "pretty unheard of". In 2022 the campaign won the New Zealand Marketing Supreme Award. When singer Tina Turner died in May 2023, many people throughout the country who heard about her death but did not know who she was believed that Tina from Turners was the one who died.
