= Sieni Leo'o Olo =

New Zealand comedian and actor

Bubbah Olo
- Born: Sieni Tiana Leo'o Olo; 1996 (age 29–30); Māngere, New Zealand
- Occupations: Actress; comedian

Sieni Tiana Leo'o Olo (also known as Bubbah Olo or Bubbah) is a Samoan–New Zealand actress and comedian. She is "Tina from Turners" in the advertisements of Turners Automotive Group.

== Early life ==
Leo'o Olo is from a self-described "huge" family. She was raised in Māngere, a suburb of Auckland. Her nickname comes from her family — Leo'o Olo has the same name as her grandmother, so they called her Bubbah to tell them apart. "They called me that because when I was born I was a little bubbah," she explained.

== Career ==
In 2012, when Leo'o Olo was sixteen, she joined the Massive Theatre Company, which started her path to acting. She was part of an ensemble that traveled in 2016 to Stirling, Scotland to present their play The Island. She appeared in Massive Theatre Company's play Chance To Ignite in 2017.

Leo'o Olo performed her show The Family Disappointment in 2018. In 2020, she wrote a show called My Ode To South Auckland and performed it in her backyard. She performed the show Catch You Up at the 2021 New Zealand International Comedy Festival.

Leo'o Olo was in the film Mama's Music Box, and on television she has appeared in SIS, Double Parked, Duckrockers, 7 Days, and Guy Montgomery's Guy Mont-Spelling Bee. She also portrayed "Tina from Turners" in a 2023 ad campaign for Turners Automotive Group.

She appeared in the fourth series of Taskmaster NZ in 2023 where she got a tattoo of the other four contestants as part of a task for the show. She began an internship writing for Shortland Street in late 2023. She was a contestant on Celebrity Treasure Island 2024, and in 2025 she co-hosted the three-part television documentary Don't.

Leo'o Olo relocated to Samoa in mid-2025.

She is inspired by Eddie Murphy and Patrice O'Neal.
