= Hoani Hotene =

New Zealand comedian

- Born: 1994 or 1995 (age 31–32); Petone, Lower Hutt, New Zealand
- Occupation: Comedian
- Awards: Billy T Award (2025)

Comedy career
- Years active: 2021–present
- Medium: Stand-up; television
- Genre: Observational comedy
- Subject: Māori culture

Hoani Hotene is a New Zealand comedian. Hotene is Māori, from the iwi Ngāti Hauā. He won the Billy T Award in 2025.

== Early life ==
Hotene is from Petone in Lower Hutt, New Zealand. The oldest of four children, Hotene is Māori, from the iwi Ngāti Hauā of the hapū Ngāti Werewere. He attended a kura kaupapa Māori school. His father is Mike Ross, a lecturer in Māori language and customs at Victoria University of Wellington.

He studied communications at Massey University, but did not complete his degree.

== Career ==
Hotene often incorporates observational comedy and Māori identity, culture, and language into his stand-up acts, including the fact that he does not appear Māori himself. He performed the show Hoh' Mamma Jamma at the New Zealand International Comedy Festival in 2024. He also has performed at the Melbourne International Comedy Festival (Hoani, Hoani, Hoani, Must Be Funny in a Rich Man's World, in 2026) and Edinburgh Fringe (Midnight Kiwi, 2025; Lord of the Zings, 2026, with Finn McLachlan and Danny Sewell).

He has been on the New Zealand panel show 7 Days, and he appeared on series 7 of Taskmaster New Zealand in 2026.

Hotene has won the Best Newcomer Award at the 2021 Wellington Comedy Awards, and the Billy T Award in 2025 for his show It's Getting Hot-ene, So Tell Me All Your Jokes.

As of 2026 he is represented by Notorious Management.

=== Stand-up shows ===
- Really Good Normal Show (2023; with Booth the Clown and Danny Sewell)
- USO Funny (2023)
- Hoh' Mamma Jamma (2024)
- Midnight Kiwi (2025)
- It's Getting Hot-ene, So Tell Me All Your Jokes (2025)
- Hoani, Hoani, Hoani, Must Be Funny in a Rich Man's World (2026)
- Lord of the Zings (2026; with Finn McLachlan and Danny Sewell)

== Personal life ==
Hotene plays the guitar as a hobby. He became vegetarian around 2019, and has since become pescatarian.
