= Chris Parker (comedian) =

New Zealand actor, comedian and writer

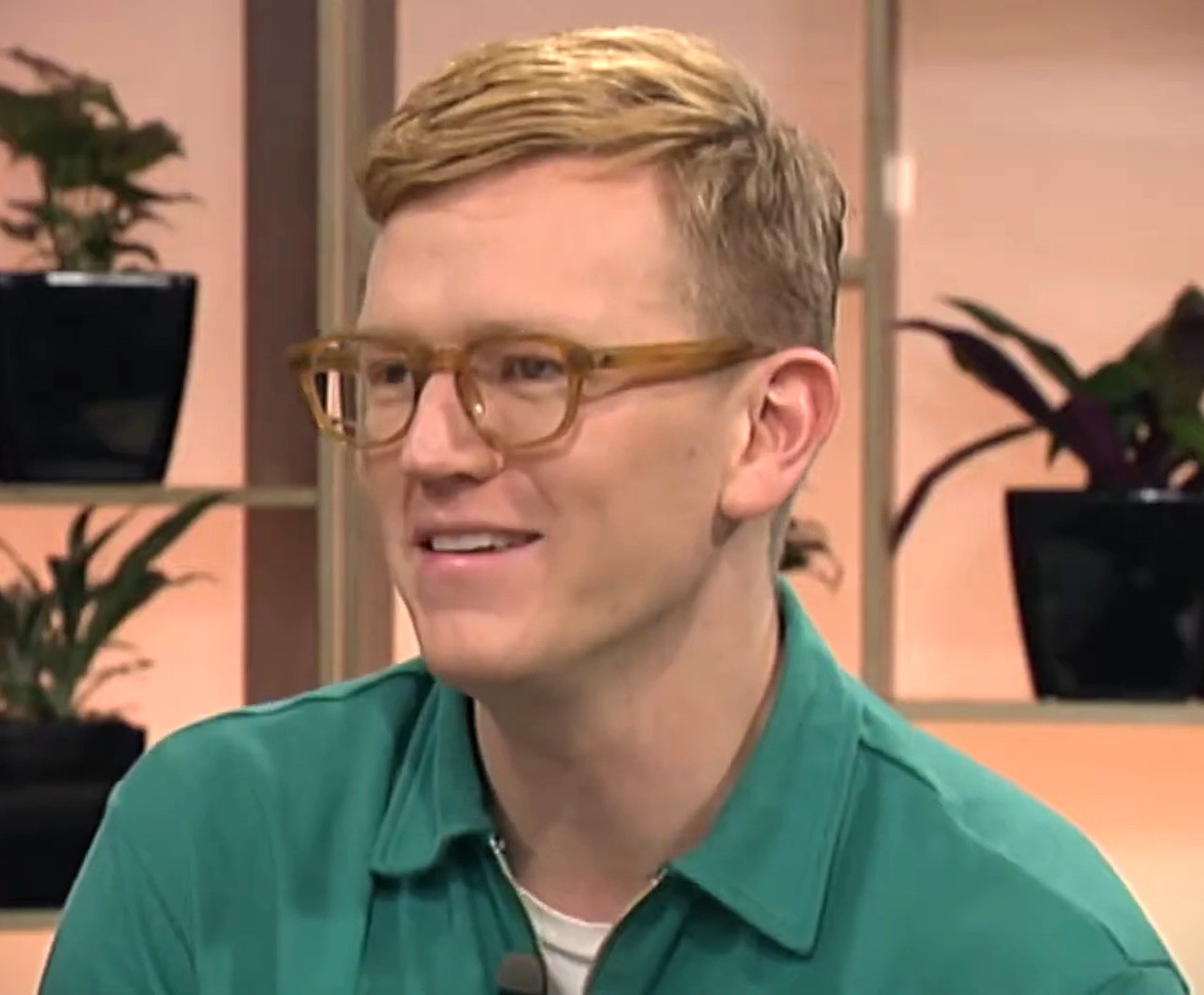
- Parker in 2018
- Born: September 25, 1990 (age 35); Christchurch, New Zealand
- Education: Toi Whakaari
- Spouse: Micheal McCabe
- Awards: Fred Award (2018)
- Website: www.chrisparkercomedy.com

Christopher Parker (born September 25, 1990) is a New Zealand actor, comedian, writer, TV personality, and podcaster.

Parker has written for and appeared in many local comedy shows such as Jono and Ben, 7 Days, Taskmaster NZ, and Have You Been Paying Attention. He has also acted in films like Baby Done, The Breaker Uppers, and Nude Tuesday.

== Early life and education ==
Parker grew up in Christchurch wanting to be a dancer while he was growing up. He spent ten years at the Christchurch-based Original Scripts Theatre School with teachers Wendy Steeds and Sonia Chappell.

He studied at the New Zealand national drama school, Toi Whakaari in Wellington, graduating in 2011 with a Bachelor of Performing Arts in Acting.

== Career ==
After moving to Auckland, he joined improv group Snort, which led to being cast as David Halls in the hit stage play Hudson and Halls Live. In 2016, he won Actor of the Year at the Wellington Theatre Awards for this role. Other stage acting credits include Shortland Street: The Musical, Gays in Space, and Another Dead Fag by Sam Brooks.

Parker has also written and performed extensively with Tom Sainsbury on live shows such as The Opening Night Before Christmas, Camping, D.O.C.ing, Giggly Gerties, and Hauraki Horror. He also created and performed several sketch comedy shows with Hayley Sproull, including Tighty Whiteys, The Outsiders' Guide, and Milky Bits.

In 2016, Parker began hosting The Male Gayz Podcast with fellow comic Eli Matthewson.

Parker won the Fred Award, an honour awarded to the best show written and performed by a NZ comedian at the New Zealand International Comedy Festival, in 2018 for his solo comedy show Camp Binch. He had previously won the Best Newcomer Award in Auckland in 2015 for his first solo show, No More Dancing in the Good Room.

In October 2018, Parker released his debut novel Here for a Good Time: Organised Thoughts From a Disorganized Mind.

In 2020 and 2021, Parker performed his show How I Felt, based on his experiences during the COVID-19 lockdown, where he gained prominence for his attempts to felt on Instagram Live. The felting videos were so popular that, in 2020, a hat that Parker created was added to the collection at Auckland Museum, and a photo of him wearing the hat was bought by the Museum of New Zealand Te Papa Tongarewa.

Parker appeared as a contestant in the 2021 season of Celebrity Treasure Island, a reality-competition television show in the style of Survivor. He won the series on behalf of Rainbow Youth, a charity that provides education, information, support and advocacy for queer, gender diverse, takatāpui and intersex youth in New Zealand.

In May 2022, Parker released a comedy documentary special, Back To School, about all-boys schools in New Zealand. Later that year, Chris and Eli's Porn Revolution was released, featuring Parker and his Male Gayz podcast co-host Eli Matthewson. The show is a Spinoff series aiming to start a nationwide conversation about pornography.

Also in 2022, Parker was a contestant on Series 3 of Taskmaster NZ, placing second in the series overall.

In 2023, Parker competed in an episode of Guy Montgomery's Guy Mont-Spelling Bee. In June 2023, Double Parked, a new Three series which Parker co-created with Alice Snedden, premiered.

== Personal life ==
As a friend of Paul Williams, Parker appeared in the fellow comedian's "Surf Music" music video as a background dancer alongside Brynley Stent and Rose Matafeo.

In October 2022, Parker married Micheal McCabe, an Auckland-based designer.

== Stand-up comedy ==
- No More Dancing in the Good Room (2015)
- Camp Binch (2018)
- Iconique (2019)
- The Best of Chris Parker (2022)
- Lots of Love (2023)

== Awards ==
- NZICF Best Newcomer Award (2015)
- NZICF Fred Award, Camp Binch (2018)
- Voted one of The Herald's Top 5 Entertainment Heroes (2020) and nominated for Television Personality of the Year (2021)
- Topp Prize (2022)
- Rielly Comedy Award, Variety Artists Club of New Zealand (2024)
