= Kura Forrester =

Comedian, actor, and writer from New Zealand

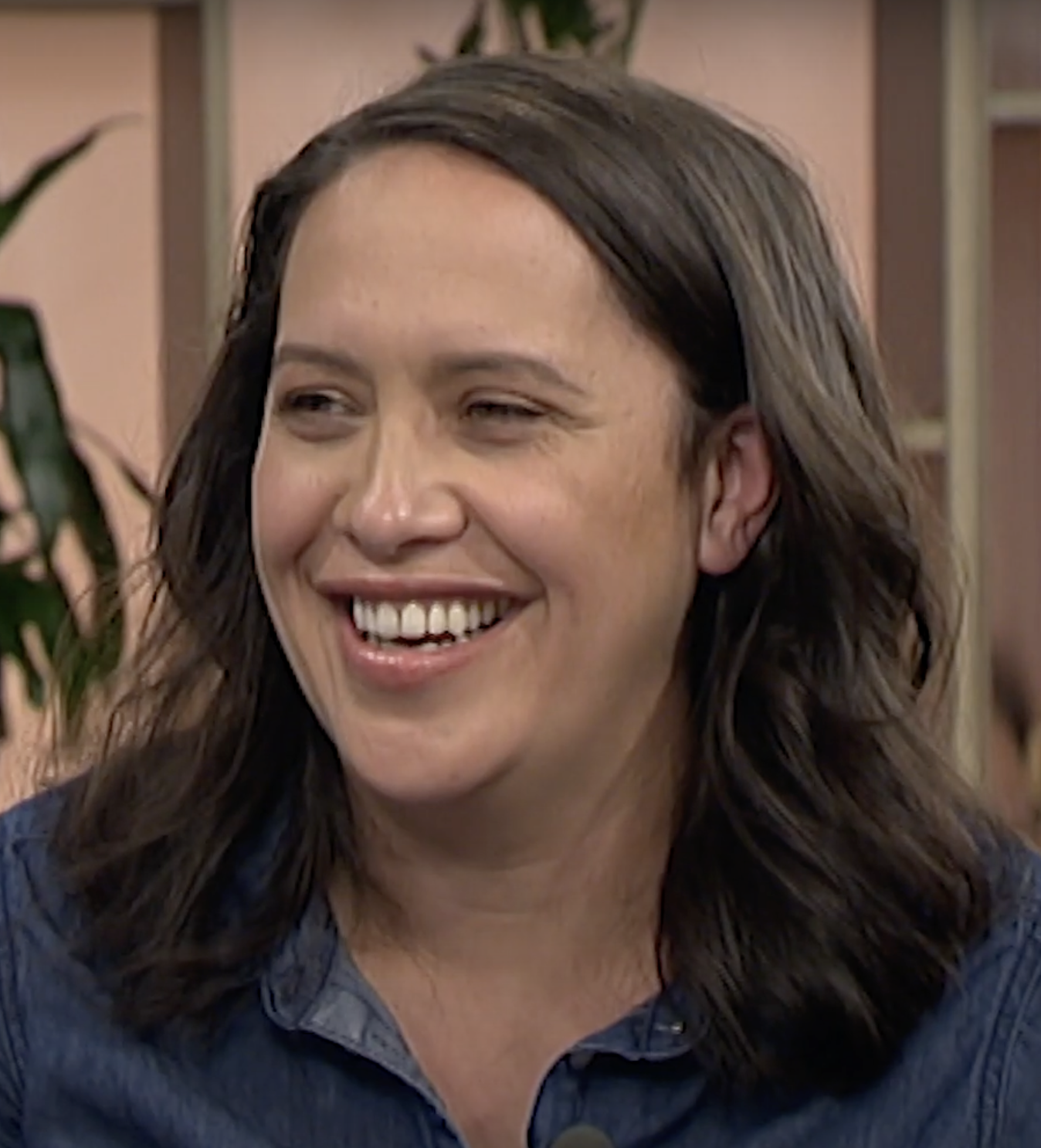
- Forrester in 2018
- Born: 1985 (age 39–40); Lower Hutt, Wellington, New Zealand
- Occupation(s): Comedian, actor, writer
- Awards: Billy T Award (2019)

Kura Leigh Forrester (born 1985) is a New Zealand comedian, actor, and writer. In 2019, she won the Billy T Award for best emerging comedian for her show Kura Shoulda Woulda. Forrester formerly appeared as core cast member Desdemona Schmidt on the prime-time soap opera Shortland Street.

== Biography ==
Forrester was born in Lower Hutt, Wellington to parents Amos (Ngāti Porou) and Robyn, who is Pākehā. Her early years were divided between Wellington and Dunedin. She attended high school at Wellington Girls' College, where she was involved in drama productions and the kapa haka roopu. Following that, Forrester studied performing arts at Auckland's Unitec Institute of Technology – graduating in 2005. She also trained for eight weeks at Philippe Gaulier's prestigious theatre school in Paris. Among her inspirations, Forrester cites Rachel House, Nancy Brunning, Miriama McDowell, Madeleine Sami, Billy T. James, Kristen Wiig, Tina Fey, Hannah Gadsby, Jackie van Beek and her family – particularly on her Māori side in Tokomaru Bay, a small community near Gisborne on New Zealand's East Coast.

== Career ==
In 2013, Forrester moved to London for two years as part of her OE, where she met fellow New Zealand comedian Jarred Christmas, who invited Forrester to perform at a comedy gig he was running. She returned to New Zealand in 2015 and performed her first solo comedy show, Tiki Tour, as part of the 2015 New Zealand International Comedy Festival.

Forrester has appeared in numerous productions across television, film, and theatre. She had a small role in Taika Waititi and Jemaine Clement's mockumentary film What We Do in the Shadows, as a victim of Viago – the vampire played by Waititi. Other feature film credits include The Breaker Upperers, Belief: The Possession of Janet Moses and Fantail.

On television, Forrester has had leading roles in Auckland Daze, Super City, Find Me A Māori Bride, The Barefoot Bandits, The Adventures of Suzy Boon, Jandal Burn, Golden Boy and Educators. In 2019, she joined the core cast of Shortland Street, New Zealand's longest-running drama and soap opera. She plays Desdemona Schmidt, the larger-than-life socialite mother of Angel Schmidt.

Forrester's theatre credits include Perplex, Camping, Ngā Pou Wahine, The Wholehearted, Amadeus and When Sun and Moon Collide.

In 2019, Forrester was nominated for the Billy T Award, an award named after iconic New Zealand comedian Billy T. James and awarded to the country's best up-and-coming stand-up comedian. As part of the 2019 New Zealand International Comedy Festival, Forrester performed her show Kura Shoulda Woulda at Auckland's Basement Theatre and Wellington's BATS Theatre. The award ceremony was held on 26 May 2019, and Forrester was awarded the Billy T. In doing so, she became the first woman of Māori descent to win the award, and the first Māori to win it since 2004. She later toured the show across New Zealand.

Forrester appeared on the panel show Patriot Brains in 2021. In 2022, Forrester was a contestant on series 3 of Taskmaster NZ. In 2023, she appeared on Guy Montgomery's Guy Mont-Spelling Bee.

She released a series on YouTube in 2025 for The Spinoff called Bryn & Ku's Singles Club with Brynley Stent.
