= Laura Daniel =

New Zealand comedian

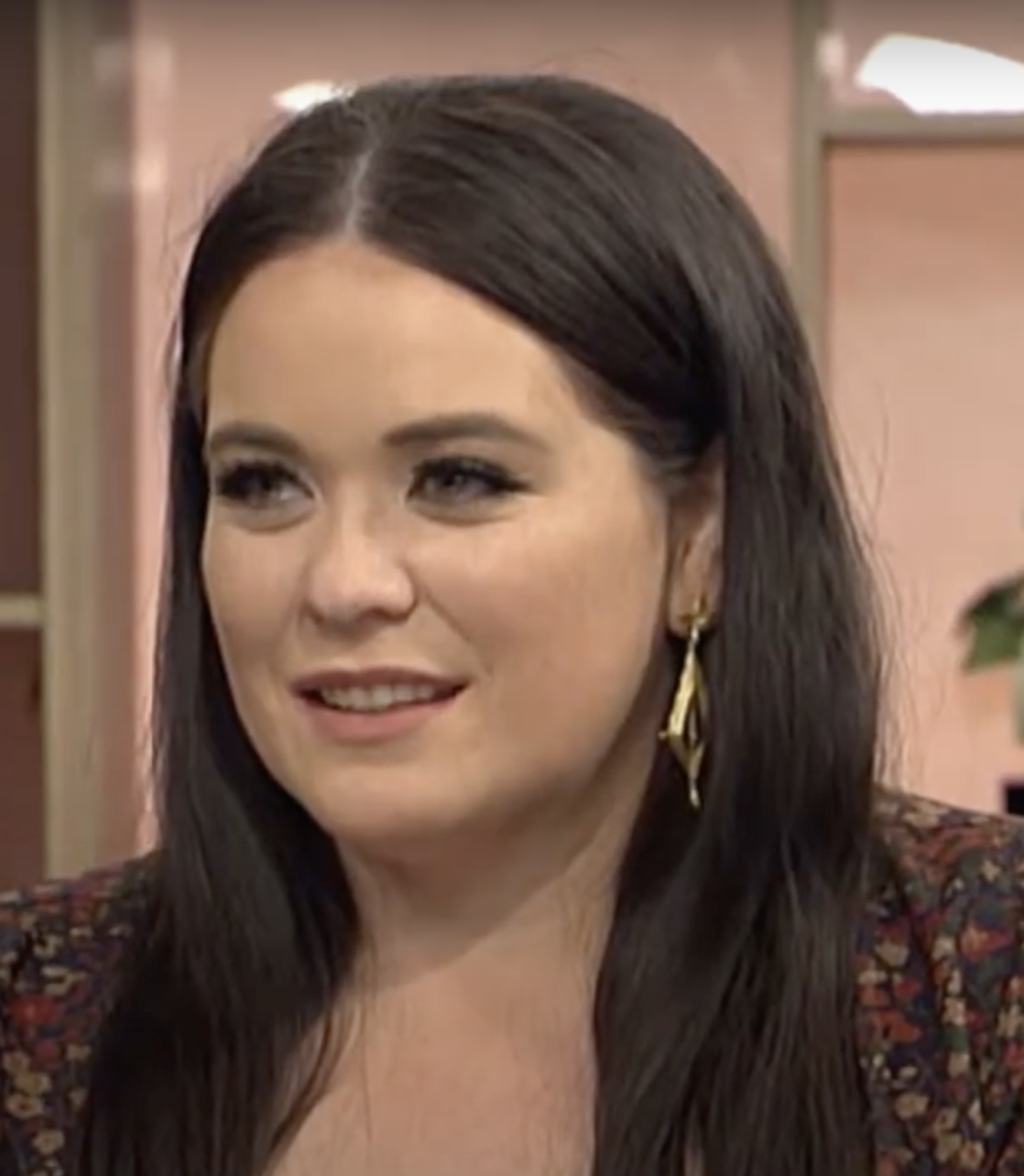
- Daniel in 2018
- Born: 1990 (age 35–36); Palmerston North, New Zealand
- Notable work: Seven Sharp; Funny Girls; Jono and Ben; Taskmaster NZ
- Spouse: Joseph Moore (m. 2022)

Comedy career
- Medium: Television

Laura Daniel (born 25 November 1990) is an actress and comedian from New Zealand.

== Career ==
She currently reports on television show Seven Sharp. Previously, she has starred in the television series Funny Girls and Jono and Ben.

She has also worked on 7 Days. She was the voice of Riley in the animated television series The Barefoot Bandits and has performed in theater and musical theater productions. Daniel also sang "This Is For My Girls" with Teuila Blakely, Daisy Lawless, Lucy Lawless, Saraid Cameron, Kimberley Crossman, Kura Forrester, and Ilah Cooper.

Daniel won series 2 of Taskmaster New Zealand in 2021. The same year she appeared on the panel show Patriot Brains.

She is a fan of the Eurovision Song Contest and has campaigned for New Zealand to take part.

In 2023, Daniel appeared on Guy Montgomery's Guy Mont-Spelling Bee.

== Personal life ==
She is in a relationship with fellow comedian Joseph Moore with whom she performs as the comedy duo Two Hearts. The couple were married in December 2022, and moved to London in 2024.

== Television ==
Year	Title	Role	Notes
2026	Saturday Night Live UK	Extended cast	Series
2023	Celebrity Treasure Island 2023	Contestant for Shine	Contestant
2023	Guy Montgomery's Guy Mont-Spelling Bee	Herself	Contestant
2022	Patriot Brains	Panelist	Series
2022	Masked Singer New Zealand	Contestant	Ruru
2022	Night Eyes	Voice Actress	Series
2021	Taskmaster New Zealand	Herself (Winner)	Series
2021	The Eggplant	Police Officer Danial	1 Episode
2021	My Life Is Murder	Isla	2 Episodes
2020	Channel Hopping With Jon Richardson	Self	Featured
2020	Alice Sneddens Bad News	Self	Featured
2018	Kiwi Christmas	Carlton	Series
2018	Making Kiwi Christmas	Herself	Series
2018	Vloggintons	Flo's Aunty	TV Mini Series
2018	The Breaker Uppers	Woman At Party	Movie
2017	Jono and Ben	Herself	Series
2016-	7 Days	Herself	Series
2014	Happy Hour	Herself	Series
