= David Correos =

Comedian from New Zealand

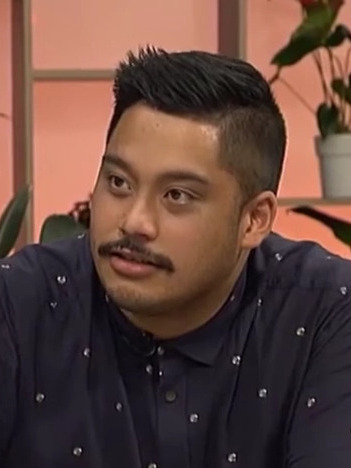
- Correos in 2017
- Born: 8 December 1992 (age 33)
- Occupation: Comedian

David Correos (/kɔːrˈeɪɔːs/ kor-AY-oss; born 8 December 1992) is a New Zealand comedian. He was the winner of the Billy T Award in 2016 and the Fred Award in 2026.

== Early life ==
Correos's parents immigrated to Christchurch in the 1980s from the Philippines; he grew up in Woolston.

During his teens, Correos trained as a weightlifter and represented New Zealand at several international events, and won his weight division at the 2012 Junior Oceania Championships. He narrowly missed out for qualification for the 2014 Commonwealth Games, where a broken ankle ended his sporting career.

Wishing to perform in musical theatre, Correos attended a two-year drama course at Hagley College, after which he applied to a broadcasting school but was denied entry. He became interested in comedy and started performing arts at Hagley Theatre Company. His friend created a variety show called Monday Night Magic for artists who had no space to perform after the 2011 Christchurch earthquake. Correos started performing stand-up alongside musicians and street performers, and began learning how to write comedy.

He moved to Auckland in 2014 where he pursued a comedy career.

== Career ==
In 2015, Correos debuted his first solo show at the New Zealand Comedy Festival called A Really Rough Ride with David Correos. Correos won the Billy T Award in 2016, with his show called Second Place Winner. and the Comic Originality award at the 2015 Comedy Guild Awards. He first performed at the Edinburgh Festival Fringe in 2017 with Matt Stellingwerf, their show entitled Chaos & Order. He also performed a solo show called Full Correos in 2017. He returned to the Edinburgh Festival Fringe in August 2018 with a new show titled The Correos Effect, and at a later date also performed it at the Fringe Festivals in Dunedin, Auckland and Adelaide. In 2019, he performed his show Better Than I Was The Last Time at Fringe. His 2021 show was called David Postoffice. His 2022 show was called Haha Horror which he performed with Hamish Parkinson. His 2023 show was called Topsy Turvy. His 2024 show was called I Can't Stop Vibrating. His 2025 show was called Noise Zealand.

Correos's television credits include appearances as a panelist on 7 Days (on which he was also a writer), The Project, and Taskmaster NZ season two; since then, Correos has also become a writer for Taskmaster NZ.

Correos has also appeared in videos by sketch comedy group Viva La Dirt League.
