= Paul Ego =

New Zealand comedian

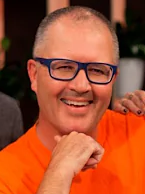
- Ego in 2017
- Born: Paul Jones; 12 March 1966 (age 60); New Zealand
- Awards: Billy T Award (2000)

Paul Ego (birth name Paul Jones; born 12 March 1966) is a Billy T Award winning New Zealand comedian. He is best known both for his past role as leader of Team One on the New Zealand comedy current affairs panel show 7 Days, and as the voice artist of the Stickman in television advertisements for PAK'nSAVE supermarket.

In the mid-1980s, Ego was the singer in an Auckland-based band called The Yes Men. He also worked as a signwriter.

Ego's first comedy gig was in London in 1994 and upon returning to New Zealand in 1995 he soon became a regular sight on the pro-comedy skyline. He performed his show Paul Ego's Show in 1999 in Auckland and Christchurch. Ego was nominated for the Billy T Award in 1999, and won the award in 2000 for his show Cool.

Ego's radio career began in 2000 with his role on the Kim & Corbett Breakfast Show on Auckland's More FM. His role on the award-winning show involved writing comedy scripts and voicing many of the show's regular characters. In 2006 Paul moved to NZ's Rock Network and became one quarter of The Morning Rumble. According to his website, he was "parolled in 2011" in order to "get to know his family again in the mornings."

In the early months of 2013 he co-starred alongside Jeremy Corbett in a comedy show called The Radio. Ego has been married to his wife Janine for 25 years, and has two sons; on his website, he claims to be a "loving but mostly ineffective father." He lives in the wealthy North Auckland suburb of Devonport, a source of several jokes from his fellow 7 Days colleagues.

In 2022, Ego was a contestant on Taskmaster New Zealand.

Ego's inspirations include Eddie Izzard.

== Awards ==
2000 Billy T award winner.

2008 WINNER Best Music & Entertainment Hosts, Metropolitan -2008 NZ Radio Awards.
