= Urzila Carlson =

South African–New Zealand comedian

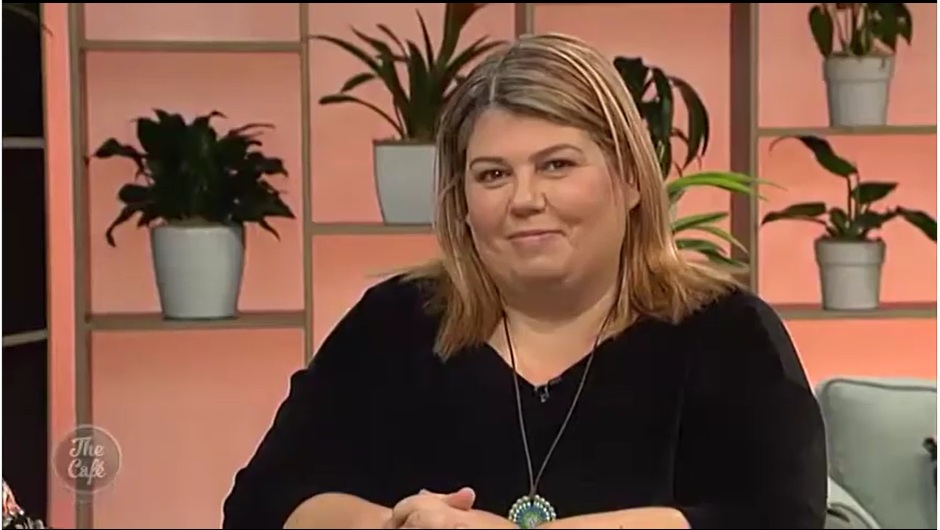
- Carlson in 2017
- Born: 1976 (age 49–50); South Africa
- Children: 2

Comedy career
- Years active: 2008–present
- Medium: Stand-up; Panel shows
- Subjects: Parenting; Emigration
- Known for: 7 Days; Have You Been Paying Attention? New Zealand; Have You Been Paying Attention? Australia; The Masked Singer Australia
- Website: urzilacarlson.com

Urzila Carlson (/ˈɜːrʃɪlə/ UR-shih-la) is a South African-born New Zealand comedian and actress, known for her stand-up performances as well as her appearances on television programs in both New Zealand and Australia. Carlson is a regular panellist on 7 Days and both the Australian and New Zealand version of Have You Been Paying Attention? She was also a panellist on The Masked Singer Australia for the show's second and third seasons and a contestant on both the second season of Taskmaster New Zealand and sixth season of Taskmaster Australia. Urzila also played Fallon in the comedy film Kinda Pregnant alongside Amy Schumer and Brianne Howey.

== Early life and education ==
Urzila Carlson was born in South Africa in 1976, the youngest of three siblings. She spent her early years in mining towns around the country. Her father was a violent alcoholic, who one night hunted his family with a handgun, until they were rescued by a neighbour. Her parents divorced when she was around 7 or 8 years old. The children were then raised by her mother, who worked 12 hours a day, 6 days a week. They lived in Benoni, near Johannesburg.

== Career ==
Carlson's first job was as a typesetter for a South African newspaper, which she did for 12 years. By the age of 24 she was production manager for a large African newspaper group, and won awards for graphic design and photograph retouching.

She moved to New Zealand in 2006 and transitioned into comedy in 2008, when she was 32.

Carlson has appeared on the Australian TV shows The Project, Studio 10, Spicks and Specks, Orange Is the New Brown, Have You Been Paying Attention?, Hughesy, We Have a Problem, and two seasons of The Masked Singer. She has also appeared on New Zealand shows 7 Days, Have You Been Paying Attention?, and Super City.

Her stand-up routines include The Long Flight To Freedom, and she has performed at the Melbourne International Comedy Festival Gala over several years.

In 2021, she was a contestant on the second series of Taskmaster New Zealand. In 2022, she was a guest judge on Drag Race Down Under, and in 2024 appeared on the Australian season of Guy Montgomery's Guy Mont-Spelling Bee.

Carlson's TV sketch show titled Urzila is being broadcast on ABC Television in Australia from 29 April 2026, and there is a sitcom with Nazeem Hussain in development during the year. She is touring Australia until 31 August 2026, followed by a tour of the UK and Ireland from 9 to 27 September 2026.

In July 2026, it was announced that Carlson would appear as part of the sixth season of Taskmaster Australia, making her the second contestant to compete in multiple international versions of the show.

== Recognition and awards ==
Carlson was nominated for the Helpmann Award for Best Comedy Performer in 2018.

In 2019, she appeared in Netflix's Comedians of the World. The same year, she was presented with the Rielly Comedy Award from the Variety Artists Club of New Zealand for her contribution to New Zealand entertainment.

She won Best Female Comedian at the New Zealand Comedy Guild Awards six times (2010–2014 and 2016).

== Personal life ==
Carlson speaks English, Zulu, and Afrikaans. She emigrated to New Zealand from South Africa in 2006 after being subjected to a series of thefts, including her car being stolen, an armed robbery at work, and a break-in at her home in which she and her neighbours confronted the intruder with cricket bats. She became a New Zealand citizen in 2012 and renounced her South African citizenship.

Carlson is a lesbian, and came out to her mother when she was 24. She refers to herself as a "lesbiterian", a portmanteau of lesbian and Presbyterian. She married her partner, Julie, in 2014, and they have a son and a daughter together. In 2024, Carlson revealed that she and her wife had divorced.

She released a memoir in 2016 called Rolling with the Punchlines.

In 2018, Carlson was named Australasian ambassador of South African Tourism, representing the country as part of an ongoing campaign to encourage Australians, New Zealanders, and South African expatriates to visit the country.

As of April 2026, she lives in West Auckland.
