= Angella Dravid =

New Zealand comedian

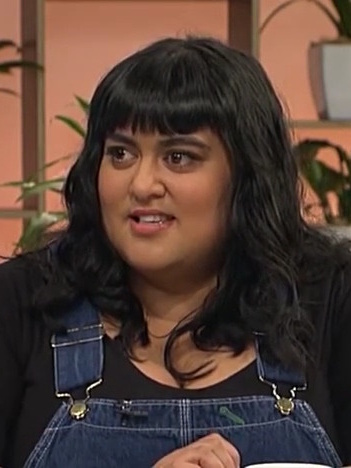
- Dravid in 2017
- Born: 1985 or 1986 (age 40–41); Oman
- Occupations: Comedian, writer, actress
- Awards: Billy T Award (2017); Fred Award (2025)

Angella Dravid (born C. 1985/1986) is a New Zealand stand-up comedian, writer and actress.

== Biography ==
Dravid was born c. 1985/1986 in Oman to a Samoan Christian mother and Indian Hindu father. She stated that being of mixed race, there were many arguments at the family dinner table, like whether to eat meat. She emigrated with her family when they settled into the rural town of Naracoorte, South Australia.

Dravid played the violin in high school and met a classical musician in a music chat room. He told her that he had been in the studio where The Spice Girls recorded. She moved to the UK to start a relationship with the man, who was older than her. They married the following year. Their relationship became abusive; aged 19, Dravid was arrested and convicted of assaulting her husband with a picture frame. There was nobody Dravid knew who could bail her out in the UK; she spent two months in prison and three years in a bail hostel, whilst pursuing work at the Royal Ascot racecourse before being deported back to New Zealand and divorcing her husband. Dravid referred to this time as a positive experience compared to the domestic violence in her marriage.

After her deportation, Dravid had no intention of pursuing a career in entertainment, and worked odd jobs including as a receptionist at a brothel. She initially attended an open mic night to get over her anxiety at working customer service facing jobs and her fear of public speaking, and continued to pursue stand-up comedy after her sets were successful.

In 2017, she decided on showbusiness, and perhaps writing a drama or serial based on her experiences; upon her choosing, she turned her thoughts of being in an abusive relationship into a show called Down the Rabbit Hole, which played the New Zealand International Comedy Festival (NZICF). For her performance Dravid won the 2017 Billy T Award, an accolade that recognises up and coming comedy performers. In 2020, it was announced she was working on adapting the play into a film.

In May 2025, Dravid received the Fred Award for best show at the New Zealand Comedy Festival for her show I'm Happy For You. She became the third woman recipient in the award's history. Dravid was nominated alongside Melanie Bracewell and Abby Howells, making 2025 the first year all nominees for the Fred Award were women.

== Filmography ==
Dravid's filmography includes:

Year	Title	Role	Notes
2017	Jono and Ben	Self	
2018	Funny Girls	Various	2 episodes
2020	Taskmaster New Zealand	Self	Series 1 Contestant
2021	Creamerie	Brandi	4 episodes
2023	Guy Montgomery's Guy Mont-Spelling Bee	Contestant	Series 1, Episode 4
2024	Under the Vines	Nurse Stacey	Recurring role
2025	Educators	Miss Patel	6 episodes
2026	Bad Company	Donna	6 episodes
