= Treasure Island (TV franchise) =

Reality competition television franchise

- Created by: Darryl McEwen
- Original work: Treasure Island (New Zealand)

Films and television
- Television series: Treasure Island; Celebrity Treasure Island

Miscellaneous
- First aired: June 1, 1997; 29 years ago
- Distributor: Warner Bros. International Television Production

Official website
- Production website New Zealand TVNZ website

Treasure Island is a reality competition television franchise. The programme originated in New Zealand in 1997, where it was originally produced by Touchdown Television and broadcast by TVNZ, with later editions produced for broadcasters in Australia and Ireland. In the programme, contestants are isolated on a remote Fijian island (early shows were filmed in Tonga) and compete for a cash prize of NZ$25,000. From the 2019 edition, the winner of the Celebrity Treasure Island will receive NZ$100,000 and NZ$50,000 for the regular season their chosen charity.

== Concept history ==
The Treasure Island concept was created by former Touchdown producer Darryl McEwen after searching in the local library for a story on which he could base a reality gameshow before the successful Swedish programme Expedition Robinson – the original version of the Survivor format.

=== Challenges ===
- 1997–2001: Contestants are required to complete a quiz on a computer about Treasure Island and about their teammates during an elimination challenge. Once both teams finished the quiz, the computer would generate the two lowest-scoring members (one from each tribe) as to who will be leaving the island.
- 2002–2007: In 2002, the winning team eliminated one person from their own tribe. The eliminated person will eliminate one of their opposition team members. In 2003, Terminator/Elimination challenge was introduced. One selected member of the team would compete with one selected member of the opposing team in a 'terminator' challenge. The winner would become the terminator and would eliminate one member from both teams at the end of each day.
- 2019–present: Tribes competed for various challenges including Rewards, face-offs and Captain's Test. Charity Challenges were introduced as individual challenges and rotated between teams daily. $170,000 was raised in the 2019 edition while 2021 season raised $215,000 for various charities across New Zealand.

== Series franchise overview ==
Legend:

Currently airing franchise
Franchise with an upcoming season
Franchise no longer aired
Status unknown

Country	Title	Network(s)	Winners	Host(s)
Australia	Treasure Island: A Quest for Survival	Seven Network	Series 1, 2000: James Wirtanen	None
Ireland	Treasure Island	RTÉ One	Series 1, 2001: Yvonne Cronin; Series 2, 2002: Sean O’Brien	None
New Zealand	Treasure Island (1–2); Treasure Island: Extreme (4); Superstars of Treasure Island (7); Treasure Island: Couples at War (8); Treasure Island: Pirates of the Pacific (9); Treasure Island: Fans vs Favs (13)	TVNZ 2	Series 1, 1997: Levi Bowen; Series 2, 1999: Tanya Pouwhare; Series 4, 2002: John "Horse" McLeod; Series 7, 2005: Josh Kronfeld; Series 8, 2006: Lance O'Sullivan & Bridgette O'Sullivan; Series 9, 2007: Hayley Holt; Series 13, 2023: Matty McLean	Mark Perry (Narrator) (1-2); Pieta Keating (2); Jacqui Rickards (4); Jon Stevens (7–8); Matthew Ridge (9); Bree Tomasel (13); Jayden Daniels (13)
New Zealand	Celebrity Treasure Island	TVNZ 2	Series 3, 2001: John "Cocksy" Cocks†; Series 5, 2003: Greer Robson; Series 6, 2004: Josh Kronfeld; Series 10, 2019: Sam Wallace; Series 11, 2021: Chris Parker; Series 12, 2022: Jesse Tuke; Series 14, 2023: James Mustapic; Series 15, 2024: JP Foliaki; Series 16, 2026: Nicola "Nix" Adams; Series 17, 2027: Upcoming series	Current; Bree Tomasel (10–present); Jayden Daniels (14, 16); Former; Pieta Keating (3, 5); John 'Horse' McLeod (5); Louise Wallace (6); Matt Chisholm (10–12); Jayden Daniels (14); Lance Savali (15)

=== New Zealand series overview ===
List of Treasure Island and Celebrity Treasure Island seasons
No.	Title	Premiere	Finale	Location	Days	Initial Tribes	Winner	Runner(s)-up	Grand Prize
1	Treasure Island	June 1, 1997	July 13, 1997	Mamanuca Islands, Fiji	21	Two tribes of six	Levi Bowen	Pieta Keating	$25,000
2	Treasure Island 2	1999	1999	Vavaʻu, Tonga	21	Two tribes of eight	Tanya Pouwhare	Graham Sayer	$25,000
3	Celebrity Treasure Island	26 August 2001	14 October 2001	Vavaʻu, Tonga	21	Two tribes of seven	John "Cocksy" Cocks†	Stacey Daniels	$20,000 (Charity: Youthline)
4	Treasure Island Extreme	15 October 2002	3 December 2002	Mamanuca Islands, Fiji	24	Two tribes of eight	John "Horse" McLeod	Paul Irwin	$30,000
5	Celebrity Treasure Island 2	5 October 2003	30 November 2003	Vavaʻu, Tonga	24	Two tribes of seven	Greer Robson	Paul Ellis	$30,000 (Charity: First Foundation)
6	Celebrity Treasure Island 3	13 June 2004	22 August 2004	Mamanuca Islands, Fiji	24	Two tribes of eight	Josh Kronfeld	Simon Barnett	$30,000 (Charity)
7	Superstars of Treasure Island	24 April 2005	26 June 2005	Vavaʻu, Tonga	24	Two tribes of eight	Josh Kronfeld	Brent Todd; John "Cocksy" Cocks†	$50,000
8	Treasure Island: Couples at War	5 February 2006	23 April 2006	Vavaʻu, Tonga	24	Two tribes of eight	Lance & Bridgette; O'Sullivan	Simon Doull; Peggy Bourne	$50,000
9	Treasure Island: Pirates of the Pacific	11 February 2007	6 May 2007	Mamanuca Islands, Fiji	24	Three tribes of six	Hayley Holt	Wendell Sailor	$50,000
10	Celebrity Treasure Island 2019	18 August 2019	24 September 2019	Mamanuca Islands, Fiji	18	Two tribes of eight	Sam Wallace	Shane Cameron; Gary 'The Wiz' Freeman	$100,000 (Charity: Starship Hospital)
11	Celebrity Treasure Island 2021	6 September 2021	3 November 2021	Ngataki, New Zealand	27	Three tribes of seven	Chris Parker	Edna Swart; Lance Savali	$100,000 (Charity: Rainbow Youth Inc)
12	Celebrity Treasure Island 2022	5 September 2022	2 November 2022	Ngataki, New Zealand	27	Three tribes of six and 3 intruders	Jesse Tuke	Courtenay Louise; Elvis Lopeti	$100,000 (Charity: Live Ocean)
13	Treasure Island: Fans Vs Faves	30 January 2023	1 March 2023	Mamanuca Islands, Fiji	15	Two tribes of eight	Matty McLean	Lana Searle; Susan Devoy	$50,000 (Charity: Zeal Education Trust)
14	Celebrity Treasure Island: Te Waipounamu	18 September 2023	25 October 2023	Wanaka, New Zealand	18	Two tribes of nine	James Mustapic	Courtney Dawson; Turia Schmidt-Peke	$100,000 (Chosen Charity: Gender Minorities Aotearoa)
15	Celebrity Treasure Island 2024	9 September 2024	16 October 2024	Mercury Bay, New Zealand	18	Two tribes of nine	JP Foliaki	Christian "Cully" Cullen; James Rolleston	$100,000 (Chosen Charity: Childfund – Water Run)
16	Celebrity Treasure Island 2026	27 April 2026	26 May 2026	Ngataki, New Zealand	18	Two tribes of eight	Nicola "Nix" Adams	Liv Parker; Louis Davis	$105,000 (Chosen Charity: Child Abuse Prevention Foundation)

==== Treasure Island (1997–2007, 2023–present) ====
Treasure Island
- Original Celebrity Treasure Island logo
- Also known as: Celebrity Treasure Island
- Genre: Reality competition
- Created by: Darryl McEwen
- Presented by: Pieta Keating; Jacqui Rickards; Louise Wallace; Jon Stevens; Matthew Ridge; Matt Chisholm; Bree Tomasel
- Narrated by: Mark Perry (1997)
- Country of origin: New Zealand
- Original language: English
- No. of seasons: 13
- No. of episodes: 58 (excluding celebrity series)

Production
- Running time: 60 minutes
- Production companies: Touchdown Television (1997–2007); Warner Bros International Television New Zealand (2019)

Original release
- Network: TVNZ
- Release: 1 June 1997 – present

==== Season 1 (1997) ====
Also called Treasure Island 1, Season 1 was shot in Fiji in 1997. Levi Bowen was the season's winner with Pieta Keating coming in second.

This season consists of 5 episodes. In Episode 1, 19 people were shortlisted from 3,000 applicants. They spend a weekend doing some team activities before 12 castaways were officially cast. The remaining 7 who didn't make the cast include Nikki (37, Farmer & Mother of 4 from Temuka), Daniel (25, Lawyer from Wellington), Hugo (22, Student from Dunedin), Ana (23, Special need teacher from Rakaia), Paul (25, Internet Technologist from Auckland), Clint (19, Student from Te Kauwhata) & Anneke (21, Trainee teacher from Devonport, Auckland) who withdrew from casting and was replaced by Loretta (20, Media Studies student).

They cast flew to Nadi, Fiji, and travelled westward to an inhabited island. Castaways were divided into 2 teams of six (3 men and 3 women). North (red) Team consist of Angus (32, Insurance Loss Adjuster from North Shore Auckland), Debbie (36, Stay-at-home Mother from Whangarei), Matt (28, PhD Genetics Student from Dunedin), Pieta (22, Writer/TV presenter from Auckland), Sunny (20, Advertising Clerk from New Plymouth) and Tama (24, Webpage designer). South (Blue) Team consist of Ally (24, Account Manager from Auckland), Chris (43, IT project manager from West Auckland), Herbie (22, Youth worker from Auckland), Levi Bowen (24yo, Trainee pilot and kitchen fitter from Hamilton East), Loretta (20, Media Studies student) and Susan Hornsby (29, Lawyer from Wellington). Every five days, two people were eliminated by a test. Day 5 - Tama (North) & Susan (South). Day 10 - Matt (North) & Chris (South). Day 13 (Unschedule elimination test) - Sunny (North) & Loretta (South). Day 15 - Debbie (North) & Herbie (South). Day 20 - Angus (North) & Ally (South). Day 21 - Pieta lost the treasure hunt. Levi won $25,000.

An additional special episode Treasure Island Revisited were showcased 2 weeks after the grand finale.

- Episode 1 – A reality series in which 12 people are deposited on a Pacific Island, with four weeks to survive and find hidden treasure. Today 19 New Zealanders participate in outdoor challenges, where only 12 will be selected to continue with the adventure.
- Episode 2 – Two teams made up of 12 people try to crack coded messages to find more parts of treasure map, the two eliminated contestants are Tama Keane and Susan Hornsby.
- Episode 3 – Two teams made up of 10 people try to crack coded messages to find more parts of treasure map, the two eliminated contestants are Matt Lambeth and Chris Robinson.
- Episode 4 – Two teams made up of eight people try to crack coded messages to find more parts of treasure map, the eliminated contestants are Sunita Torrance, Loretta Blackburn, Debbie Ujdur and Herbert Sherman.
- Episode 5 – Two teams made up of four people try to crack coded messages to find more parts of treasure map, the eliminated contestants are Angus Bradley, Ally Fox and Pieta Keating, the winner of the $25,000 is Levi Bowen.
- Episode 6 – A behind the scenes look at the reality series in which 12 people are deposited on a Pacific Island, with four weeks to survive and find hidden treasure.

==== Season 2 (1999) ====
A reality series in which 16 people are deposited on a Pacific Island in Tonga with four weeks to survive and find hidden treasure and hosted by previous contestant Pieta Keating. The 16 people were separated into two tribes with Tongan names based on the geographical camp base; Hahake (East) and Hihifo (West)

Radio DJ Tanya Pouwhare from Palmerston North was the season's winner against Graham. Gisborne C4 music TV host Clarke Gayford and Chad made it to the final 4.

- Episode 1 – 20 people endure the audition weekend and the final 16 are selected.
- Episode 2 – The 16 people arrive at their island and divide into two groups.
- Episode 3 – Teams struggle to understand a cryptic message and personality conflicts ensue, lack of food causes a snake fest, and Nikki and Maea are eliminated.
- Episode 4 – Teams are desperate for food, Hihifo suffer the effects of poorly prepared kape (Tongan taro), a pig is caught, tempers flare as there are difficulties decoding the clues, and Mia Pistorius and Daile are eliminated.
- Episode 5 – Team Hihifo delay their rivals through trade and speed ahead to their second part of the map, Harry and Hayden are eliminated.
- Episode 6 – Team internal conflicts continue, Hihifo find the fifth part of the treasure map, but lose equipment and food to Hahake in tough trade talks, Ngaio McGee and Sandra are eliminated.
- Episode 7 – Tensions arise between Revell and his Hihifo teammates, Michele braves a 15-metre climb up a palm tree, Diana and Michele are eliminated.
- Episode 8 – Hahake and Hihifo both race to the Kava Altar to find the seventh piece of the treasure map, Hahake are angry that their outrigger canoe was taken without their knowledge, Revell and Kane Stanford are eliminated.
- Episode 9 – Today, Chad Carter and Clarke Gayford are eliminated, the last two contestants Tanya Pouwhare and Graham Sayer fight it out for the $25,000 by following a series of clues, Hahake team member Tanya is the winner.
- Episode 10 – The last time they met they were battling it out on a deserted island in the pacific, now they meet again on TREASURE ISLAND 2: THE REUNION.

==== Season 3 (2002) ====
Treasure Island: Extreme was hosted by model Jacqui Rickards. The 16 personnel from the police, SAS, armed forces and soldiers competed against each other in the most "extreme" condition in the show history. They were marooned offshore of the island without any food, water or shelter and were separated into Blue Team and Red Team. On each elimination day, both teams lost a team player. John "Horse" McLeod was the season's winner.

A notable incident happened when the SAS contestant Baz Rice was eliminated from the game and refused to leave, instead of hiding in the jungle. Because of previous threats made to rival contestants, a security warning was issued to other competitors. He eventually returned from the jungle and left the island.

- Episode 1 – A reality series in which 16 of New Zealand's armed services elite arrive at their island and divide into two groups.
- Episode 2 – Red win the challenge and Roo and Red are eliminated.
- Episode 3 – Red win the third challenge, Baz and Tomo are eliminated but Baz goes missing.
- Episode 4 – Blue win the fourth challenge, Jeff considers leaving the island, Barry collapses in the water, Hayden breaks rules by swimming out to a yacht at night, Baz is found and Jeff and Nancy are eliminated.
- Episode 5 – Red win the fifth challenge, Hayden and Phill are eliminated.
- Episode 6 – Blue team win the sixth challenge, Red win bonus water, AJ and Barry Duffield are eliminated.
- Episode 7 – Blue win the challenge and Daz and Muddi are eliminated.
- Episode 8 – Blue win the challenge, Blue win bonus water and food, Aroha and Kelvin are eliminated, Horse finds the hidden treasure against Paul.

==== Season 4 (2005) ====
Superstars of Treasure Island was hosted by singer Jon Stevens. This season saw past winners and past season favourites put back onto the island, which included past Irish and Australian winners.

Euakafa Village (Blue team) consisted of Louise Wallace (NZ), John "Horse" McLeod (NZ), Bernadette Duffy (Ireland), Emma Forster (Australia), Josh Kronfeld (NZ), John 'Cocksy' Cocks (NZ), James Wirtanen (Australia) and Aroha Treacher (NZ). Taunga Village (Red team) consisted of Michael Laws (NZ), Levi Bowen (NZ), Sean O'Brien (Ireland), Pieta Keating (NZ), Brent Todd (NZ), Sally Maxwell (Australia), Cassie Edwards (Australia) and Erika Takacs (NZ)

Josh Kronfeld was the season's winner, becoming the first person to win two seasons of Treasure Island consecutively.

- Episode 1 – Teams establish camp and complete their first challenges.
- Episode 2 – Bernadette Duffy and Cassandra Edwards are eliminated and a coup replaces Michael Laws with Brent Todd as Team Chief for Team Taunga.
- Episode 3 – James Wirtanen and Michael Laws are eliminated and a coup replaces Louise Wallace with John McLeod (Horse) as Team Chief for Team Euakafa.
- Episode 4 – Louise Wallace and Levi Bowen are eliminated and a coup replaces John McLeod (Horse) with Emma Forster.
- Episode 5 – Aroha Treacher and Erika Takacs are eliminated and a coup replaces Emma Forster with Josh Kronfeld as Team Chief for Team Eakafa.
- Episode 6 – Sally Maxwell and Emma Forster are eliminated and two coups threaten the chiefs position but remains.
- Episode 7 – Sean O'Brien is eliminated, loyalty issues arise in the camps and a coup replaces John Cocks with Brent Todd as Team Chief for the new team.
- Episode 8 – Pieta Keating is eliminated and a coup replaces John (Horse) McLeod with Brent Todd as Team Chief for the new team.
- Episode 9 – The competitors are given their next challenges and John McLeod (Horse) is eliminated.
- Episode 10 – The last three competitors are given their final challenges and Josh Kronfeld wins and finds the treasure against Brent Todd & John "Cocksy" Cocks

==== Season 5 (2006) ====
Treasure Island: Couples at War was hosted by Jon Stevens in his second stint on the show. This season put 8 celebrity couples against each other; these included former Miss Popularity Vicky-Lee McIntyre & Scotty Rocker, Vadim Dale & Natalie Franzman, Jaimee Provan & Johnny Claxton, Bridgette O'Sullivan and Lance O'Sullivan, Simon Doull & Peggy Bourne, Jay-Jay Feeney & Dominic Harvey, Paula Stockwell & Zane Nicholl and Courtney Robinson & Mark Hewlett.

The O'Sullivans were the season's winners with Simon Doull and his partner Peggy Bourne coming in second.

- Episode 1 – A reality series in which eight couples are deposited on an island and must survive and find hidden treasure, today the teams are decided and the challenges begin.
- Episode 2 – The couples adjust to their separation, teams must find missing teammates, team leaders Lance O'Sullivan and Jay-Jay Feeney drink disgusting milkshakes and a surprise exit for Mark and Courtney.
- Episode 3 – Divisions within the teams, Vadim and Natalie go head to head in an endurance challenge, the teams navigate an obstacle course blindfolded and the women win a challenge and take the men's goats.
- Episode 4 – An elimination challenge sees Paula and Zane leave the island, the contestants must solve clues to find food, Vicky-Lee becomes the new leader of the women's team when Jay-Jay Feeney is overthrown.
- Episode 5 – The fallout from the leadership swap in the women's team, the team leaders must go up against their partners in a challenge, an elimination challenge sees Jay-Jay Feeney and Dominic Harvey leave the island and new team leaders Peggy Bourne and Vadim Dale take control.
- Episode 6 – The women are frightened by noises in the night, the men win a memory challenge and secure themselves more food, Vadim beats Peggy in the leaders challenge and wins steaks for the men, Natalie and Vadim win a romantic night away from their teams, Vicky-Lee and Scotty beat Jaimee and Johnny in the elimination challenge and the teams become one again.
- Episode 7 – Illness and injury abound, Vadim wins outright leadership before a challenge sees Bridgette take control, the contestants are concerned about strange occurrences on the island and Lance and Bridgette win a luxury night together.
- Episode 8 – Peggy and Simon win the Chief's challenge, Vadim and Natalie beat Scotty and Vicky-Lee in the elimination challenge leaving Vadim and Natalie with three pieces of the map.
- Episode 9 – Lance and Bridgette are accused of cheating and get put straight into the elimination round, Peggy and Simon get the final piece of the map, Vadim and Natalie compete in the elimination round against Lance and Bridgette and lose, leaving the Island.
- Episode 10 – The final two couples face off against each other and Lance and Bridgette O'Sullivan win the grand prize.
- Episode 11 – A special programme that looks back and reveals the truth about what happened behind the scenes on previous series of Treasure Island.

==== Season 6 (2007) ====
Treasure Island: Pirates of the Pacific was hosted by former celebrity contestants Matthew Ridge. This season initial featured two tribes – The Buccaneers, which included New Zealand Idol runner-up Michael Murphy, former New Zealand Warriors league player Monty Betham, Aja Rock, Carolyn Taylor, Jay Quinn and Elizabeth Grey; and The Corsairs, which included Australian disgraced rugby union player Wendell Sailor, David Beckham's former assistant Rebecca Loos, April Ieremia, Glen Osbourne, Steve Devine and Li Ming Hu.

The first twist of the season is an additional tribe, also known as The Others – consist of Dancing With The Stars dancer Hayley Holt, DIY Rescue builder Doug Thompson, personal trainer Keri Ropati, Mr India NZ Jay Singh, Miss Hawaiian Tropic Carena West and Cleo Bachelor Of The Year Nick Curnow. Hayley Holt was the season's winner with Wendell Sailor coming in second.

- Episode 1 – A reality series in which 18 celebrities are transported to a Fijian island, are split into teams and the challenges begin.
- Episode 2 – Team captains Jay Quinn and April Ieremia must escape from water filled barrels, new team The Others join game to compete for $50,000, teams must race to find missing captains, and Michael Murphy loses blindfold elimination race and is first to leave island.
- Episode 3 – Teams must race to collect coconuts from water and bring them to shore, Monty Betham wins captains challenge to keep leadership and loot five items from The Others camp, and Jay Singh is the second to leave island.
- Episode 4 – Teams must carry their captains through obstacle course, captains must shoot five netball hoops and their teammates eat live grubs for each missed shot, Li Ming Hu loses high wire elimination challenge and is third person to leave island.
- Episode 5 – Teams must cross three floating pontoons and dive for gold bars, Steve Devine wins captain's memory challenge to keep leadership, captains put weakest members into slave trade auction, and Rebecca Loos is fourth person to leave island.
- Episode 6 – A look back at the cunning tactics, shocks, surprises, truth and the lies that have shaped the game so far.
- Episode 7 – Teams must collect coconuts to win an outdoor bathroom, see-saw a team member high enough to light fuse hung in the air, Rebecca Loos returns to join the Corsairs team as a prize, and Jay Quinn and Keri Ropati are next to leave island.
- Episode 8 – Teams must negotiate an obstacle course chained together, captains face a maths test, and Carolyn Taylor and Steve Devine are the next to leave island.
- Episode 9 – Celebrities must compete in an individual challenge, Monty Betham and Glen Osborne choose new teams, captains are hung upside-down and tortured by other team, and Carena West and Elizabeth Gray are next to leave island.
- Episode 10 – Teams must fire coconuts into barrel to avoid team member being subjected to snakes crabs and leeches, captains must retrieve rocks from sea floor to complete puzzle, and Aja Rock and Rebecca Loos are next to leave island.
- Episode 11 – Teams are merged and game becomes individual, celebrities nominate who they would like to kick off island, they must collect clues from beneath water to solve puzzle, crack pirate code to unscramble words, and Nick Curnow is next to leave island.
- Episode 12 – Celebrities must navigate a minefield blindfolded, they are split into three teams of pairs for the remainder of the competition and sent to separate camps, teams must retrieve coconuts from floating pontoon and fill bucket with coconut milk, and Monty Betham and Glen Osborne are next to leave island.
- Episode 13 – The final show-down between The Corsairs (Hayley Holt & Wendell Sailor) vs The Buccaneers (April Ieremia & Doug Thompson) goes when they must memorise legend of Treasure Island and race to find pirate skeletons. Wendell Sailor and Hayley Holt win tie-breaker challenge and must turn on each other in race to find hidden treasure, and Hayley Holt wins $50,000 of treasure.

==== Season 7 (2023) ====
After 16 years of hiatus, the seventh edition of Treasure Island also known as Treasure Island: Fans vs Faves returned to Fiji which premiered on January 30, 2023 with Tomasel returning as host without Chisholm. TVNZ announced Jayden Daniels will be co-host with Tomsel in the upcoming season which will be broadcast on TVNZ 2 and TVNZ+. Eight fans go head to head with eight celebrities from previous seasons, all looking for redemption and hungry for the win. This season was the first season to include former seasons contestants and winner since Superstars of Treasure Island in 2005. Matty McLean won the treasure hunt on Day 15 and took $50,000 for Zeal NZ. Lana Searle and Dame Susan Devoy were the other two finalists. This season raised $120,000 across 9 various charities across New Zealand.

==== Season 1 (2001) ====
This season was hosted by Pieta Keating for the second consecutive season. This was the first Celebrity Treasure Island season.

Following the format of TV2's hit show Treasure Island, 14 celebrities divide into two teams to compete for $20,000 for the Youthline charity. South Team - Blue: Frank Bunce, rugby player; Nicky Watson, model; John "Cocksy" Cocks, My House, My Castle handyman; Katrina Hobbs, actor; Dominic Bowden, music show presenter; Jane Kiely, TV presenter; Trent Bray, swimmer. North Team - Red: Sally Ridge, Changing Rooms designer; Danny Morrison, NZ Cricketer; Nicki Sunderland, ZM DJ; Anthony Ray Parker, actor; Stacey Daniels, TV presenter; Andy Dye, Changing Rooms builder; Erika Takacs, singer. TV handyman John "Cocksy" Cocks won, with television presenter Stacey Daniels coming in second.

- Episode 1 – Following the format of TV2's hit show Treasure Island, celebrities divide into two teams to compete for $20,000 for Youthline. Both teams establish camp and solve their first clues.
- Episode 2 – The teams hunt for food, decipher clues and bid $4,200 for a mystery box of food.
- Episode 3 – The teams continue their quest to solve clues and find bounty, have a trade meeting after contraband is discovered, and Nicki and Trent are eliminated.
- Episode 4 – Teams continue their quest to solve clues and find bounty, have a trade meeting, and Danny and Jayne are eliminated.
- Episode 5 – North win a challenge for a breakfast, conflict, anger, and physical clash erupts between Anthony Ray Parker and John Cocks, teams have a trade meeting, Dominic and Erika are eliminated.
- Episode 6 – North win a challenge for a chocolate cake, teams have a trade meeting, Nicky and Anthony Ray Parker are eliminated.
- Episode 7 – South win a challenge for a cooked chicken, Sally and Katrina are eliminated.
- Episode 8 – Four famous faces will become two. Final elimination Frank and Andy are eliminated. There's more pain than they can bear to think about - no food, no fun, just the relentless pursuit of buried treasure. Because just one of them will take home $20,000 for Youthline. John wins the battle against Stacey for the grand prize.

==== Season 2 (2003) ====
Season 2 was hosted by Pieta Keating for the third consecutive season. The contestants were split into two teams – Girls Team, which included Greer Robson, Eva Evguenieva, Louise Wallace, Nicky Watson, Suzanne Paul, Jenny May Coffin and K'lee; and the Boys Team, which included Paul Ellis, Cory Hutchings, Michael Laws, Matthew Ridge, Jason Gunn, Ewen Gilmore and Marc Ellis. Shortland Street actress and current lawyer Greer Robson was the season's winner, with ex-Shortland Street star, Paul Ellis coming in second.

- Episode 1 – A reality series in which 14 celebrities are divided into 2 teams and establish camp and complete their first challenges.
- Episode 2 – K'Lee and Marc Ellis are eliminated.
- Episode 3 – The teams are evacuated due to bad weather, and Jason Gunn and Jenny-May Coffin are eliminated.
- Episode 4 – The teams face new mental and physical challenges and Suzanne Paul and Ewen Gilmour are eliminated.
- Episode 5 – The teams face new mental and physical challenges, and Nicky Watson and Matthew Ridge are eliminated.
- Episode 6 – The teams face new mental and physical challenges and Michael Laws and Louise Wallace are eliminated.
- Episode 7 – The final terminator challenges and Eva Eugeneva and Cory Hutchings are eliminated.
- Episode 8 – Greer Robson wins the $30,000 treasure for the First Foundation charity for talented children.
- Episode 9 – The celebrities reunite to review their experiences on the island.

==== Season 3 (2004) ====
Season 3 was hosted by previous contestant Louise Wallace. The season's contestants included Josh Kronfeld, Simon Barnett, Brent Todd, Ian Roberts, Maz Quinn, Troy Flavell, Torenzo Bozzone, Matthew Ridge, Aja Rock, Charlotte Dawson, Jayne Kiley, Joe Cotton, Lana Coc-Kroft, Wendy Botha, Hayley Marie Byrnes, and Nicky Watson. TV presenter Lana Coc-Kroft was struck down with a virus and had to be evacuated off the island. Ex-All Black Josh Kronfeld was the season's winner, with Simon Barnett coming in second place.

- Episode 1 – Teams establish camps and complete first challenges.
- Episode 2 – The teams face their first terminator challenge, Charlotte is marooned for a night and Troy Flavell, and Hayley Marie Byrnes are the first contestants eliminated.
- Episode 3 – Ian Roberts is crippled by a bad back and is encouraged to leave the island, plus league player Matthew Ridge and model Nicky Watson arrive to join the teams.
- Episode 4 – Joe Cotton and Josh Kronfeld are caught cheating, Nicky Watson is eliminated.
- Episode 5 – Clashes in the women's camp, Aja Rock becomes new women's captain, Matthew Ridge and Jayne Kiely are eliminated.
- Episode 6 – Food is in desperation, further clashes in the women's camp, and Wendy Botha-Todd and Terenzo Bozzone are eliminated.
- Episode 7 – Josh gets frustrated with the game and the victorious terminator is forced to swap team members with the opposite team.
- Episode 8 – A mystery illness strikes Red captain, Lana Coc-Kroft, and Aja Rock and Lana Coc-Kroft are eliminated.
- Episode 9 – Josh Kronfeld and Brent Todd are handcuffed together for 24 hours, Joe Cotton sneaks food to the opposing team, and Maz Quinn and Brent Todd are eliminated.
- Episode 10 – Josh Kronfeld becomes the winner of 2004 Celebrity Treasure Island.
- Episode 11 – The celebrities reunite to review their experiences on the island.

==== Season 4 (2019) ====
Celebrity Treasure Island 2019 marked the show's return after a hiatus of more than a decade. Hosted by Survivor NZ producer and host Matt Chisholm, as well as ZM's Drive host Bree Tomasel. The classic Kiwi game show featured 16 celebrity castaways paired up as they completed challenges for the chance to win $100,000 for their charity of choice in Fiji. The season premiered on Sunday 18 August, 7 pm and continues Monday & Tuesday 7.30 pm, TVNZ 2. This was to be the final show that Matt Chisholm presented with TVNZ. Sam Wallace was the sole Kāhu member left, and the eventual winner, who took $100,000 for Starship Hospital. Shane Cameron and Gary "the Wiz" Freeman were the other two finalists, and Athena Angelou finished fourth. This season raised $170,000 across 9 various charities across New Zealand.

==== Season 5 (2021) ====
After a COVID-19 pandemic enforced break in 2020, the fifth edition of Celebrity Treasure Island was filmed over summer 2021 on the coast of Ngataki, New Zealand, instead of the usual location in Fiji. The season premiered on the 6th of September. In this season, Chisholm and Tomasel returned as hosts, and 21 celebrity castaways go 'head-to-head' for the chance to win $100,000 for their chosen charity. By the end of this season, Chris Parker was the sole Katipō member left, and the eventual winner. Parker won $100,000, and donated it to Rainbow Youth Inc. The other two finalists were Edna Swart and Lance Savali. This season raised $215,000 across 13 various charities throughout New Zealand.

==== Season 6 (2022) ====
The sixth edition of Celebrity Treasure Island was filmed in the summer of 2022 on the coast of Northland, New Zealand with Chisholm and Tomasel returned as hosts. Va'aiga 'Inga' Tuigamala was confirmed to be part of the cast who died ahead of filming Celebrity Treasure Island. The rest of the cast were officially announced in August 2022 with Mike King, Dame Susan Devoy & Ron Cribb who entered the game as mystery intruders, joining Alex King, Siobhan Marshall & Guy Montgomery. Courtenay Louise, Te Kohe Tuhaka, Karen O'Leary, Shimpal Lelisi and Perlina Lau. Melodie Robinson, Cam Mansel, Elvis Lopeti, Dylan Schmidt & Cassie Roma. Jesse Tuke, Eds Eramiha, Lynette Forday, Dr Joel Rindelaub and Iyia Liu. This season premiered on 5 September, and airs weekly, Monday to Wednesday, at 7:30 PM on TVNZ 2 and TVNZ+; hosted by Matt Chisholm and Bree Tomasel. One of the twenty-one celebrities will win a grand prize of $100,000 for their chosen charity. Jesse Tuke won the treasure hunt on Day 27 and took $100,000 for Live Ocean. Courtenay Louise and Elvis Lopeti were the other two finalists. This season raised $205,000 across 14 various charities across New Zealand.

==== Season 7 (2023) ====
The seventh edition of Celebrity Treasure Island also known as Celebrity Treasure Island: Te Waipounamu was filmed in the summer of 2023 in Te Waipounamu, New Zealand, with Tomasel returning as host without Chisholm and Jayden Daniels returned after hosting Treasure Island: Fans vs Faves with Tomasel. This season premiered in September 18, and airs weekly, Monday to Wednesday, at 7:30 PM on TVNZ 2 and TVNZ+. One of the eighteen celebrities will win a grand prize of $100,000 for their chosen charity.

James Mustapic won the treasure hunt on Day 18, taking $100,000 for Gender Minorities Aotearoa. Courtney Dawson and Turia Schmidt-Peke were the other two finalists. This season raised $170,000 across nine various charities across New Zealand. James was the only person in history who had not competed in any elimination challenge and won the treasure hunt on his first attempt.

=== Australian Treasure Island (2000) ===
The Australian version, Treasure Island A Quest for Survival, produced by David Mason premiered on the Seven Network following the 2000 Summer Olympics. It aired on Sunday nights at 7pm, premiered on 10 January 2000 with 9 episodes.

Sixteen contestants are isolated on a Tongan island in the South Pacific to compete for a cash prize of A$50,000. Participants were chosen based on practical skills, adaptiveness, and humor. Throughout the competition, contestants mark estimated treasure locations on a map every three days, with the participant furthest from the target facing elimination. Following an initial training period, team members voted to reduce the group size from ten to eight participants.

The 16 castasways were split into two teams – West Team which included Michael "Mike" Kent, Emma Forster, Daniel Popping, Sally Maxwell, Cassandra 'Cassie' Edwards, Justine Salkilld-Campbell, Steve Ibbotson Craig Sharpe; and the East Team which included Tomi Pitra, Gavin Heath, Maggie Dawson, Monika Karwan, Alexandra "Alex" Simpson, Frank Matzka, Kym Clare and James Wirtanen, with James Wirtanen being crowned the winner.

Four contestants took part in the franchise's international edition, Superstars of Treasure Island. Emma Forster & James Wirtanen in Euakafa Village (Blue team) and Sally Maxwell & Cassandra 'Cassie' Edwards in Taunga Village (Red team).

=== Irish Treasure Island (2001–2002) ===
Treasure Island was one of Ireland's first major reality programme. It ran for two series, airing through the summers of 2001 and 2002 on RTÉ One. Based on a New Zealand format, two groups of strangers lived and survived on a remote island in Tonga with one winner taking home the £50,000 prize. COCO Television also produced the spin-off series Treasure Island Uncut and Treasure Island Live for RTÉ Network 2. The show was axed after its second series and replaced by Cabin Fever in 2003.

==== Series 1 (2001) ====
The first series aired on RTÉ One at 8pm each Sunday night from 15 July to 12 September 2001. Commissioned by Billy McGrath - then Commissioning Editor of Entertainment - it was RTÉ's and Ireland's first major reality TV series.

Almost 31,000 people applied to take part in the first series. The first programme involved 22 people vying to be part of the final 16. They ranged in age from 19 to 63. The group of 22 would then be taken to Killary Harbour, Connacht, where they faced a series of physical and psychological challenges. After two days the final 16 were chosen and taken immediately to Dublin Airport, where they departed for Tonga. When they arrived on the island the teams were split into two teams, the East/Blue team and the West/Red team locating on each side of the island.

- Blue Team: Yvonne Cronin (Winner), Tom Tom O'Brien, Becky Fennel, Robin Creagh, Geoff Fisher, Sheila Comerford, Lewize Crothers, Peter Finn
- Red Team: Tom Barton (2nd Place), Patrick Doorey, Carole Ross, Paul Gannon, Faith Atkinson, Mary Ann McCormack, Martin Laheen, Ann Murphy

A spin-off series was shown on Network 2 named Treasure Island Uncut on Monday nights at 10:35 pm.

==== Series 2 (2002) ====
The second series aired between June 16 and August 30, 2002. Before becoming a Senator, Mark Daly appeared on this series of Treasure Island; he came third in the series. The spin-off series Treasure Island Uncut was again shown on Network 2, but RTÉ introduced a new spin-off series for RTÉ One called Treasure Island Live, that was hosted by Brendan Courtney and shown on Tuesday nights at 8 pm.

Sean O'Brien won the treasure hunt beating Ann Collins, Annette Woolley, Aoife MacCana, Bernadette Duffy, Chantelle McCann, Damian Manning, Dave O'Brien, Ian Tighe, Mark Daly, Mary T. O'Connor, Patricia O'Mahony, Sabine Sheehan, Sean Paul Teeling, Trevor McDaniel and Winston Roberts.

Sean O'Brien (the winner of Series 2) and his wife Bernadette Duffy (a contestant of Series 2), took part in the franchise's international edition, Superstars of Treasure Island.
