= Bree Tomasel =

Australian radio host and author

- Born: 1988 or 1989 (age 37–38); Stanthorpe, Queensland, Australia
- Education: University of Queensland
- Occupations: Radio host; TV host; author
- Known for: Bree & Clint; Celebrity Treasure Island
- Awards: New Zealand TV Personality of the Year (2022)

Bree Tomasel (born 1988 or 1989) is an Australian radio host, television personality, and author based in New Zealand.

== Early life ==
Bree Tomasel was born to Dianne and Stephen Tomasel and raised on an apple orchard in Stanthorpe, Queensland, Australia. She has an older sister, Amber, and a younger brother, Aiden. She grew up in Pozieres where she attended Pozieres State School and Stanthorpe State High School; she was also involved with multiple sports.

When Tomasel was nine years old, she and her family were held at knifepoint during a home invasion at her grandmother's home. At 15, Tomasel moved to Brisbane to attend St Peters Lutheran College, a boarding school, where she continued to play sports.

Tomasel played softball for the Queensland Academy of Sport before attending the University of Queensland, where she earned a bachelors degree in communication.

== Career ==
After completing university, Tomasel started her career in radio in 2010 broadcasting during the weekend at Nova 106.9 in Brisbane, where she had had an internship. She then moved to Hit101.3 Central Coast in New South Wales where she co-hosted the breakfast show Bree and Gawndy. In 2018, Tomasel moved to New Zealand to co-host Bree & Clint with Clint Roberts on radio station ZM.

On television, Tomasel has co-hosted Celebrity Treasure Island for multiple seasons, presenting Celebrity Treasure Island 2021 and 2022, Treasure Island 2023, Celebrity Treasure Island: Te Waipounamu, and Celebrity Treasure Island 2024. She has also appeared on panel shows such as 7 Days, Have You Been Paying Attention?, and You Got This (which she hosted).

In 2022, she won the award for New Zealand TV Personality of the Year. Tomasel published the book Unapologetically Me: Tales From My Perfectly Imperfect Life in 2024. Tomasel was a contestant on the sixth season of Taskmaster New Zealand. As of 2025, Tomasel is represented by DRB Entertainment.

== Personal life ==
Tomasel is bisexual. She lives in Auckland with her partner, Sophia Gould, whom she met in 2018. The couple announced their engagement in March 2026. They have two dogs.

== Bibliography ==
- Tomasel, Bree (14 October 2024). Unapologetically Me: Tales From My Perfectly Imperfect Life. Allen & Unwin NZ. ISBN 9781991006752.
