= Celebrity Treasure Island 2019 =

- Season 4
- Presented by: Matt Chisholm; Bree Tomasel
- No. of days: 18
- No. of castaways: 16
- Winners: Sam Wallace (Starship Hospital)
- Runners-up: Gary 'The Wiz' Freeman; Shane Cameron
- Location: Fiji
- No. of episodes: 18

Release
- Original network: TVNZ 2 TVNZ OnDemand
- Original release: 18 August – 24 September 2019

Season chronology
- ← Previous; Pirates of the Pacific Next → 2021

Celebrity Treasure Island 2019 marked the show's return after a hiatus of more than a decade. Hosted by Survivor NZ producer and host, Matt Chisholm, as well as ZM radio's Drive host Bree Tomasel. The classic Kiwi game show will have 16 celebrity castaways pair up as they complete challenges for the chance to win $100,000 for their charity of choice in Fiji. The season premiered on Sunday 18 August, 7 pm and continues Monday & Tuesday 7.30 pm, TVNZ 2. This was to be the final show that Matt Chisholm presented with TVNZ.

Sam Wallace was the sole Kāhu member left, and the eventual winner, who took $100,000 for Starship Hospital. Shane Cameron and Gary 'The Wiz' Freeman were the other two finalists, and Athena Angelou finished fourth. This season raised $170,000 across 9 various charities across Aotearoa.

== Castaways ==
The 16 celebrities were initially separated into two tribes with te reo Māori names based on fauna of New Zealand: Mako (Shortfin Shark) and Kāhu (Swamp Harrier), including the merged tribe as Kākāriki (parakeets).

The 16 contestants were: Boxer Shane Cameron; former Canterbury and All Black winger, Zac Guildford; DJ Athena Angelou; Olympic champion board sailor Barbara Kendall; Olympic champion rower and road cycling time trialist, Eric Murray; former rugby league star and coach Gary 'The Wiz' Freeman; actress Jodie Rimmer; Former Shortland Street star Karl Burnett (retired due to mental exhaustion); singer Ladi6; fitness model and middle-distance runner Lana Van Hout; former Bachelor contestant Lily McManus; TVNZ morning show weatherman Matty McLean; former weatherman, children show host and current DJ Sam Wallace; Moses Mackay of Sol3 Mio; influencer, model and former charity boxer Roseanna Arkle; and former C4 host and DJ turned yoga instructor, Shannon Ryan.

Castaways of Celebrity Treasure Island season 2019
Castaways	Original tribe	Switched tribe	Merged tribe	Finish	Charity prize raised
Sam Wallace; 38, The Hits Breakfast Host; Chosen Charity: Starship Hospital	Kāhu	Kāhu	Kākāriki	Winner; Won Treasure Hunt; Day 18	$100,000 + $10,000
Gary 'The Wiz' Freeman; 56, Former Rugby League Footballer; Chosen Charity: Big Buddies NZ	Mako	Mako	Kākāriki	Runner-up; Lost Treasure Hunt; Day 18	N/A
Shane Cameron; 41, Boxer; Chosen Charity: Key to Life	Mako	Mako	Kākāriki	Runner-up; Lost Treasure Hunt; Day 18	$10,000
Athena Angelou; 28, Flava DJ; Chosen Charity: Diabetes NZ	Mako	Mako	Kākāriki	12th Eliminated; Lost Duel; Day 17	N/A
Shannon Ryan; 31, TV Host & Personality; Chosen Charity: Blind foundation guide dogs	Kāhu	Kāhu	Kākāriki	11th Eliminated; Lost Duel; Day 16	$10,000
Barbara "Barbs" Kendall; 51, Former Olympic Windsurfer; Chosen Charity: Surf Life Saving New Zealand	Mako	Mako	Kākāriki	10th Eliminated; Lost Duel; Day 15	$5,000
Moses Mackay; 28, Opera Singer; Chosen Charity: Dream Chaser Foundation	Mako	Kāhu	Kākāriki	9th Eliminated; Lost Duel; Day 14	$17,500
Eric Murray; 37, Former Olympic Rower; Chosen Charity: Autism NZ	Kāhu	Kāhu	Kākāriki	8th Eliminated; Lost Duel; Day 13	$10,000
Jodie Rimmer; 45, Actress; Chosen Charity: Talk Peach	Kāhu	Kāhu		7th Eliminated; Lost Duel; Day 12	$5,000
Matty McLean; 33, Breakfast Weatherman; Chosen Charity: Rainbow Youth Inc	Mako	Mako		6th Eliminated; Lost Duel; Day 9	N/A
Lily McManus; 22, International Reality Star; Chosen Charity: National foundation for the deaf	Kāhu			5th Eliminated; Lost Duel; Day 7	N/A
Lana Van Hout; 27, Middle Distance Athlete; Chosen Charity: Child Cancer Foundation	Mako			4th Eliminated; Lost Duel; Day 6	$2,500
Rosanna “Rosie” Arkle; 30, Instagram Influencer; Chosen Charity: Heart Kids NZ	Mako			3rd Eliminated; Lost Duel; Day 4	N/A
Karoline 'Ladi6' Park-Tamati; 36, Singer; Chosen Charity: Safe man, safe family	Kāhu			2nd Eliminated; Lost Duel; Day 3	$5,000
Zac Guildford; 30, Former All Blacks; Chosen Charity: Upside Downs NZ	Kāhu			1st Eliminated; Lost Duel; Day 2	N/A
Karl Burnett (Note: Karl Burnett withdrew from competition to be with his family); 43, Shortland Street Icon; Chosen Charity: St John New Zealand	Kāhu			Withdrew; Left Competition; Day 2	N/A

== Challenges overview ==
Castaways competed against one another in a series of formidable dramatic showdowns daily to test the celeb's brains, brawn and endurance, to their limit throughout their time on the island;

- Charity Challenges — offered cash prizes for the castaway’s chosen charities
- Team Face-Offs — pitting the tribes against each other in a fight for supplies
- Elimination Duels — Battles whittling down the numbers with tears, tantrums and twists

Challenges overview of Celebrity Treasure Island season 2019
Day	Individual charity		Reward	Face-off	Captaincy		Captain Test	Elimination			Eliminated	Ref.
1			Mako	Kāhu	Sam	Barbs	Barbs					
2	Mako	Moses		Kāhu	Sam	Barbs		Zac	vs.	Matty	Zac Guildford	
3	Kāhu	Ladi6		Kāhu	Sam	Barbs		Ladi6	vs.	Shane	Ladi6	
4	Mako	Moses & Shane		Kāhu	Sam	Barbs		Shannon	vs.	Rosie	Rosanna “Rosie” Arkle	
5	Kāhu	Jodie		Mako	Shannon	Barbs	Barbs					
6	Mako	Lana & Shane		Kāhu	Shannon	Barbs		Sam	vs.	Lana	Lana Van Hout	
7	Kāhu	Shannon		Kāhu	Shannon	Barbs		Lily	vs.	Gary	Lily McManus	
8	Mako	Moses		Kāhu	Shannon	Gary	Shannon					
9	Kāhu	Shannon		Kāhu	Shannon	Gary		Jodie	vs.	Matty	Matty McLean	
10	Mako	Shane		Mako	Shannon	Gary		Eric	vs.	Shane	~~Shane Cameron~~ (Note: Mako used the mercy card and save Shane from elimination)	
11	Kāhu	Eric		Mako	Moses	Gary	Gary					
12	Mako	Barbs		Mako	Shannon	Gary		Jodie	vs.	Athena	Jodie Rimmer	
13	Kākāriki	Eric		Athena+Barbs +Moses+Sam				Eric	vs.	Shannon	Eric Murray	
14	Kākāriki	Moses		Sam				Moses	vs.	Shannon	Moses Mackay	
15	Kākāriki	Sam		Sam				Barbs	vs.	Shannon	Barbara "Barbs" Kendall	
16			Shannon	Gary				Athena	vs.	Shannon	Shannon Ryan	
Day	Face-off		Elimination								Eliminated	Ref.
17	Sam		Athena		vs.	Gary		vs.	Shane		Athena Angelou	
18			Gary		vs.	Sam		vs.	Shane		Gary "The Wiz" Freeman	
18			Gary		vs.	Sam		vs.	Shane		Shane Cameron	

The contestant was eliminated after their first time in the elimination challenge.
The contestant was eliminated after their second time in the elimination challenge.
The contestant was eliminated after their third time in the elimination challenge.
The contestant was eliminated after the fourth or more time in the elimination challenge.
