= Celebrity Treasure Island 2022 =

- Season 6
- Presented by: Matt Chisholm; Bree Tomasel
- No. of days: 27
- No. of castaways: 21
- Winners: Jesse Tuke (Live Ocean)
- Runners-up: Courtenay Louise; Elvis Lopeti
- Location: Ngataki, Northland
- No. of episodes: 27

Release
- Original network: TVNZ 2 TVNZ+
- Original release: September 5 – November 2, 2022

Season chronology
- ← Previous; Celebrity Treasure Island 2021 Next → Treasure Island 2023

Celebrity Treasure Island 2022 is the sixth celebrity edition and the 12th season overall of the New Zealand reality-television series Treasure Island which returned to Ngataki, Northland, New Zealand. This season premiered on 5 September, and aired weekly, Monday to Wednesday, at 7:30 p.m. on TVNZ 2 and TVNZ+; hosted by Matt Chisholm and Bree Tomasel. One of the twenty-one celebrities won a grand prize of $100,000 for their chosen charity.

Jesse Tuke won the treasure hunt on Day 27 and took $100,000 for Live Ocean. Courtney Louise and Elvis Lopeti were the other two finalists. This season raised $205,000 across 14 various charities across New Zealand.

== Castaways ==
Eighteen celebrities were initially separated into three tribes with te reo Māori names based on flora and fauna of New Zealand: Kauri (Agathis australis), Kuaka (Bar-tailed godwit) and Mangō (Great white shark), including the merged tribe as Toroa (a Southern royal albatross).

This season was the first not to incorporate the show's pirate theme tradition in the game-play and introduced three celebrities (Dame Susan Devoy, Mike King and Ron Cribb) entered the competition subsequently as intruders on Day 2, Day 4 and Day 7 respectively.

On Day 1, the twenty-second contestant was honoured as part of the cast. Former All Black Va'aiga 'Inga' Tuigamala travelled to the filming location with the rest of the cast but left for health reasons and subsequently died. His chosen charity was awarded $5,000. On Day 9, Ron Cribb won the individual charity challenge and announced that he competed for two charities instead of one; (Stand for Children) & former All Blacks Inga's charity (Alliance Health Plus).

Castaways of Celebrity Treasure Island Season 2022
Castaways	Original Tribe	Intruded Tribe	Switched Tribe	Merged Tribe	Finish	Charity Prize Raised
Jesse Tuke; 30, Sports Commentator; Chosen Charity: Live Ocean	Mangō	Mangō	Kuaka	Toroa	Winner; Won Treasure Hunt; Day 27	$100,000 + $10,000
Courtenay Louise; 28, Actress; Chosen Charity: Voices of Hope	Mangō	Mangō	Mangō	Toroa	Runner-up; Lost Treasure Hunt; Day 27	$10,000
Elvis Lopeti; 28, Dancer/TikTok Star; Chosen Charity: Sisters United Trust	Kauri	Kauri	Mangō	Toroa	Runner-up; Lost Treasure Hunt; Day 27	$5,000
Siobhan Marshall; 40, Actress; Chosen Charity: South Pacific Animal Welfare (SPAW)	Kauri	Kauri	Kuaka	Toroa	18th Eliminated; Lost Duel; Day 26	$10,000
Cam Mansel; 30, Ngāti Whātua & Ngāpuhi ZM FM Host; Chosen Charity: Music Helps'	Kauri	Kauri	Kuaka	Toroa	16th Eliminated; Lost Duel; Day 24	$2,500
Dame Susan Devoy; 58, Former World Squash Champion; Chosen Charity: The Aunties	Intruder	Kauri	Kuaka	Toroa	16th Eliminated; Lost Duel; Day 24	$5,000
Ron Cribb; 46, Former All Blacks; Chosen Charity: Stand for Children & Alliance Health Plus	Intruder	Kuaka	Mangō	Toroa	15th Eliminated; Lost Duel; Day 22	$15,000
Dr. Joel Rindelaub; 35, TV Scientist; Chosen Charity: House of Science (South Auckland)	Kauri	Kauri	Mangō	Toroa	14th Eliminated; Lost Duel; Day 21	$10,000
Karen O'Leary; 44, Actress/Comedian; Chosen Charity: Mary Potter Hospice	Kuaka	Kuaka	Mangō	Toroa	13th Eliminated; Withdrew; Day 20	$2,500
Perlina Lau; 32, Actress; Chosen Charity: Duffy Books in Homes	Kuaka	Kuaka	Mangō	Toroa	12th Eliminated; Lost Duel; Day 19	N/A
Melodie "Mel" Robinson; 49, Kāi Tahu's Former Black Ferns; Chosen Charity: Make-A-Wish Foundation	Kauri	Kauri	Kuaka		11th Eliminated; Lost Duel; Day 18	$5,000
Shimpal "Shim" Lelisi; 49, Actor & Comedian; Chosen Charity: Women's Refuge	Kuaka	Kuaka	Kuaka		10th Eliminated; Lost Duel; Day 16	$5,000
Te Kohe "TK" Tuhaka; 40, Actor; Chosen Charity: Water Safety New Zealand	Mangō	Mangō	Mangō		9th Eliminated; Lost Duel; Day 15	N/A
Dylan Schmidt; 25, Olympian; Chosen Charity: Special Olympics New Zealand	Mangō	Mangō	Kuaka		8th Eliminated; Lost Duel; Day 14	$10,000
Lynette Forday; 54, Shortland Street Legend; Chosen Charity: Sticks 'n' Stones	Kauri	Kauri	Mangō		7th Eliminated; Lost Duel; Day 11	N/A
Cassie Roma; 41, Entrepreneur; Chosen Charity: Make-A-Wish Foundation	Mangō	Mangō			6th Eliminated; Withdrew; Day 10	N/A
Alex King; 24, Mai FM Host, Actress; Chosen Charity: I Am Hope	Kuaka	Kuaka			5th Eliminated; Lost Duel; Day 9	$10,000
Iyia Liu; 29, Entrepreneur/Influencer; Chosen Charity: Ronald McDonald House Auckland	Mangō	Mangō			4th Eliminated; Lost Duel; Day 8	N/A
Mike King; 60, Mental Health Advocate; Chosen Charity: Gumboot Friday	Intruder	Mangō			3rd Eliminated; Withdrew; Day 6	N/A
Eds Eramiha; 36, Ngāpuhi Actor; Chosen Charity: New Zealand Mental Health Awareness	Kuaka	Kuaka			2nd Eliminated; Lost Duel; Day 5	N/A
Guy Montgomery; 33, Comedian; Chosen Charity: Auckland City Mission	Kuaka	Kuaka			1st Eliminated; Lost Duel; Day 3	N/A
Va'aiga 'Inga' Tuigamala; 52, Former All Blacks; Chosen Charity: Alliance Health Plus	In memoriam					$5,000

== Challenges ==
Day	Individual Charity		Reward	Face-off	Intruder	Captaincy			Captain Test	Elimination			Eliminated	Ref.
1			Kauri	Kuaka		Alex	Lynette	Iyia	Iyia					
2	Kuaka	Alex		Mangō (Note: As winners, Mangō assigned the intruder, Susan, as a new captain of Kuaka.)	Susan	Alex	Susan	Iyia	Susan					
3	Kauri	Elvis		Kauri		Alex	Susan	Iyia		Guy	vs.	TK	Guy Montgomery	
4	Mangō	Dylan		Mangō (Note: As winners, Mangō received the intruder, Mike, as their new captain.)	Mike	Alex	Susan	Mike	Mike					
5	Kuaka	Alex		Kauri		Alex	Susan	Mike		Eds	vs.	Dylan	Eds Eramiha	
6	Kauri	Mel		Mangō (Note: For this face-off, Kuaka was given the privilege to choose any players to be part of their team and chose TK (Mangō).)		Alex	Susan	Mike		N/A	vs.	N/A	Mike King (Note: Mike King withdrew from competition.)	
7			Kuaka (Note: Lynnette (Kauri), Ron (Kuaka) and Dylan (Mangō) took part on individual endurance challenge)	Mangō (Note: Kauri used the "Steal" privilege from Mangō)	Ron (Note: Ron has defaulted to Kuaka as being the last intruder left.)	Ron (Note: Won the majority votes during change of captaincy voting.)	Susan	Cassie	Ron					
8	Mangō	Dylan		Kauri		Ron	Susan	Cassie		Karen	vs.	Iyia	Iyia Liu	
9	Kuaka	Ron (Note: Ron competed for two charity; Stand for Children & former All Blacks Inga's charity Alliance Health Plus.)		Kauri		Ron	Susan	Cassie		Alex	vs.	Courtenay	Alex King	
10	Kauri	Joel		Mangō (Note: Tribes reshuffled to Kuaka & Mangō.)		Jesse		Courtenay	Jesse					
11	Kuaka	Siobhan		Mangō		Jesse		Courtenay		Susan	vs.	Lynette	Lynette Forday	
12			Jesse (Note: Individual Challenge rewarded to be the sole person to access the monolith.)			Jesse		Courtenay						
13	Mangō	Ron		Mangō		Cam		Courtenay	Courtenay					
14	Kuaka	Shim		Kuaka		Cam		Courtenay		Dylan	vs.	TK	Dylan Schmidt	
15	Mangō	Courtenay		Kuaka		Cam		Courtenay		Mel	vs.	TK	Te Kohe "TK" Tuhaka	
16	Kuaka	Siobhan		Mangō		Jesse		Courtenay	Courtenay					
17	Mangō	Joel & Karen		Mangō		Jesse		Courtenay		Shim	vs.	Elvis	Shimpal "Shim" Lelisi	
18	Kuaka	Jesse		Mangō		Jesse		Courtenay		Mel	vs.	Joel	Melodie "Mel" Robinson	
19	Mangō	Joel & Ron		Courtenay (Note: As the tribes merged, Individual Challenge at play and immunity awarded to first four finishers; Courtenay, Joel, Sioban & Ron.)						Elvis	vs.	Perlina	Perlina Lau	
20	Toroa	Cam & Ron		Siobhan						Courtenay	vs.	Ron	~~Courtenay Louise~~; Karen O'Leary (Note: Karen switch out Courtney's elimination and withdrew from the game.)	
21	Toroa	Jesse		Jesse						Joel	vs.	Siobhan	Dr. Joel Rindelaub	
22	Toroa	Susan		Siobhan						Jesse	vs.	Ron	Ron Cribb	
23	Toroa	Courtenay	Jesse	Courtenay										
Day	Reward	Face-off	Elimination										Eliminated	Ref.
24		Elvis & Jesse	Cam & Susan				vs.		Courtenay & Siobhan				Cam Mansel	
24		Elvis & Jesse	Cam & Susan				vs.		Courtenay & Siobhan				Dame Susan Devoy	
25 & 26	Courtenay & Siobhan	Elvis & Jesse	Courtenay				vs.		Siobhan				Siobhan Marshall	
27			Courtenay			vs.	Elvis		vs.	Jesse			Courtenay Louise	
27			Courtenay			vs.	Elvis		vs.	Jesse			Elvis Lopeti	

The contestant was eliminated after their first time in the elimination challenge.
The contestant was eliminated after their second time in the elimination challenge.
The contestant was eliminated after their third time in the elimination challenge.
The contestant was eliminated after the fourth or more time in the elimination challenge.
