= Treasure Island 2023 =

- Season 7
- Presented by: Bree Tomasel; Jayden Daniels
- No. of days: 15
- No. of castaways: 16
- Winners: Matty McLean (Zeal NZ)
- Runners-up: Lana Searle; Dame Susan Devoy
- Location: Mamanuca Islands, Fiji
- No. of episodes: 15

Release
- Original network: TVNZ 2 TVNZ+
- Original release: 30 January – 1 March 2023

Season chronology
- ← Previous; Celebrity Treasure Island 2022 Next → Celebrity Treasure Island 2023

Treasure Island 2023 (Treasure Island: Fans v Faves) was the seventh regular edition and the 13th season overall of the New Zealand reality-television series Treasure Island which returned to Mamanuca Islands, Fiji since the COVID-19 pandemic. This season premiered on 30 January 2023, and aired weekly, Monday to Wednesday, at 7:30 PM on TVNZ 2 and TVNZ+; hosted by Bree Tomasel and a new co-host Jayden Daniels. This season was the first season to include former seasons contestants and a winner since Superstars of Treasure Island in 2005, competed in charity challenges and a chance to win $50,000.

Matty McLean won the treasure hunt on Day 15 and took $50,000 for Zeal NZ. Lana Searle and Dame Susan Devoy were the other two finalists. This season raised $120,000 across nine various charities across New Zealand.

== Castaways ==
Eight fans went head to head with eight celebrities from previous seasons, all looking for redemption and hungry for the win. The 16 castaways were initially separated into two tribes with Fijian names based on fauna of Fiji: Vai Vealoni (Fijian manta ray) and Beka Beka (Fijian monkey-faced bat).

Team Vai consisted of "The Fans" and Team Beka were "The Faves" of the show.

- Day 1 – Josh Oakley revealed to the cast that he was Dame Susan Devoy's son.
- Day 5 – Matty McLean won the captain's test and chose Alex King to switch tribes.
- Day 7 – Both tribes merged (Cokovata in Fijian) and became the most castaways within the camp in the show's history.
- Day 8 – The face-off winner, Art Green, chose three castaways (instead of the usual two) for a double-elimination challenge in the show's history.
- Day 14 – Matty McLean won the final reward challenge, which included $10,000 for his charity.

Castaways of Treasure Island: Fans v Faves Season 2023
Castaways	Original Tribe	Switched Tribe	Merged Tribe	Finish	Charity Prize Raised
Matty McLean; 33, Breakfast Weatherman; 2019, Chosen Charity: ZEAL Education Trust	Beka	Beka	Cokovata (Merged)	Winner; Won Treasure Hunt; Day 15	$50,000 + $10,000
Lana Searle; 34, More FM Host; 2021, Chosen Charity:The Cake Detective	Beka	Beka	Cokovata (Merged)	Runner-up; Lost Treasure Hunt; Day 15	$5,000
Dame Susan Devoy; 58, Former World Squash Champion; 2022, Chosen Charity: The Aunties NZ	Beka	Beka	Cokovata (Merged)	Runner-up; Lost Treasure Hunt; Day 15	$2,500
Dave "Wardie" Ward; 45, Nelson, Container Terminal Supervisor; Chosen Charity: Te Kiwi Maia	Vai	Vai	Cokovata (Merged)	13th Eliminated; Lost Duel; Day 14	$10,000
Art Green; 35, TV Host/Entrepreneur; 2021, Chosen Charity: Movember NZ	Beka	Beka	Cokovata (Merged)	11th/12th Eliminated; Lost Duel; Day 13	$10,000
Lance Savali; 29, International Dancer/Choreographer; 2021, Chosen Charity: Heart Foundation NZ	Beka	Beka	Cokovata (Merged)	11th/12th Eliminated; Lost Duel; Day 13	$15,000
Alex King; 25, Mai FM Host, Actress; 2022, Chosen Charity: Duffy Books	Beka	Vai	Cokovata (Merged)	10th Eliminated; Lost Duel; Day 11	$2,500
Joe Cotton; 45, Former TV/Radio Host; 2004, Chosen Charity: Motor Neuron Disease (MND) NZ	Beka	Beka	Cokovata (Merged)	9th Eliminated; Lost Duel; Day 10	N/A
Jane Yee; 43, Auckland, Podcaster, The Spinoff; Chosen Charity: Autism NZ	Vai	Vai	Cokovata (Merged)	8th Eliminated; Lost Duel; Day 9	$10,000
Adam O’Brien; 33, Auckland, Labourer/Former Survivor NZ Contestant; Chosen Charity: Trees That Count	Vai	Vai	Cokovata (Merged)	6th/7th Eliminated; Lost Duel; Day 8	N/A
Anna Thomas; 28, Auckland, Personal Trainer/Event Manager; Chosen Charity: The Kindness Institute	Vai	Vai	Cokovata (Merged)	6th/7th Eliminated; Lost Duel; Day 8	N/A
Katie Isla Middleton; 30, Artist/Nanny; Chosen Charity: Inner City Women's Group	Vai	Vai	Cokovata (Merged)	5th Eliminated; Lost Duel; Day 7	N/A
Josh Oakley; 26, Mount Maunganui, Area Sales Manager; Chosen Charity: Big Buddy NZ	Vai	Vai		4th Eliminated; Lost Duel; Day 6	$5,000
Josh "Joshie" Kronfeld; 51, Former All Blacks/Physiotherapist; 2004 & 2005, Chosen Charity: Race4Life NZ	Beka	Beka		3rd Eliminated; Lost Duel; Day 5	N/A
Jessica "Jess" Waru; 22, Auckland, Influencer; Chosen Charity: Revolution Tour Trust	Vai			2nd Eliminated; Lost Duel; Day 3	N/A
Micah Marsh; 22, Waiheke Island, Gym Membership Consultant; Chosen Charity: Child Fund	Vai			1st Eliminated; Lost Duel; Day 2	N/A

== Challenges ==
Day	Individual Charity		Reward	Face-off	Captaincy		Captain Test	Elimination					Eliminated	Ref.
1				Vai	Jane	Matty	Jane							
2	Vai	Josh		Beka	Jane	Matty		~~Wardie~~ (Note: Jane switched Wardie with Micah); Micah	vs.			Joshie	Micah Marsh	
3	Beka	Lance		Beka	Jane	Matty		Jess	vs.			Art	Jessica "Jess" Waru	
4	Vai	Wardie		Beka	Anna (Note: Won the majority votes during change of captaincy voting.)	Matty	Matty (Note: Chose Alex to switch to Vai.)							
5	Beka	Lance		Beka	Anna	Matty		Josh	vs.			Joshie	Josh "Joshie" Kronfeld	
6	Vai	Jane		Beka	Anna	Matty		Josh	vs.			Art	Josh Oakley	
7	Beka	Art		Wardie				Katie	vs.			Susan	Kathryn "Katie" Isla Middleton	
8	Cokovata	Art		Art				Adam	vs.	Anna	vs.	Jane	Adam O’Brien	
8	Cokovata	Jane		Art				Adam	vs.	Anna	vs.	Jane	Anna Thomas	
9	Cokovata	Lana		Lance				Alex	vs.			Jane	Jane Yee	
10	Cokovata	Alex (Note: Won $2,500 each); Susan		Wardie				Art	vs.			Joe	Joe Cotton	
11	Cokovata	Wardie		Lance				Alex	vs.			Lana	Alex King	
12	Cokovata	Lance	~~Art~~ (Note: Matty switched reward with Art and gain an advantage in the face-off); Matty	Art										
Day	Reward	Face-off	Elimination										Eliminated	Ref.
13		Lana & Matty	Art & Lance				vs.		Susan & Wardie				Art Green	
13		Lana & Matty	Art & Lance				vs.		Susan & Wardie				Lance Savali	
14	Matty (Note: Matty won $10,000 for his charity and a reward scroll.)	Lana & Matty	Susan				vs.		Wardie				Dave "Wardie" Ward	
15			Lana			vs.	Matty		vs.	Susan			Lana Searle	
15			Lana			vs.	Matty		vs.	Susan			Dame Susan Devoy	

The contestant was eliminated after their first time in the elimination challenge.
The contestant was eliminated after their second time in the elimination challenge.
The contestant was eliminated after their third time in the elimination challenge.
The contestant was eliminated after the fourth or more time in the elimination challenge.
