= John Cocks (builder) =

New Zealand celebrity builder (1966-2019)

John Mark 'Cocksy' Cocks
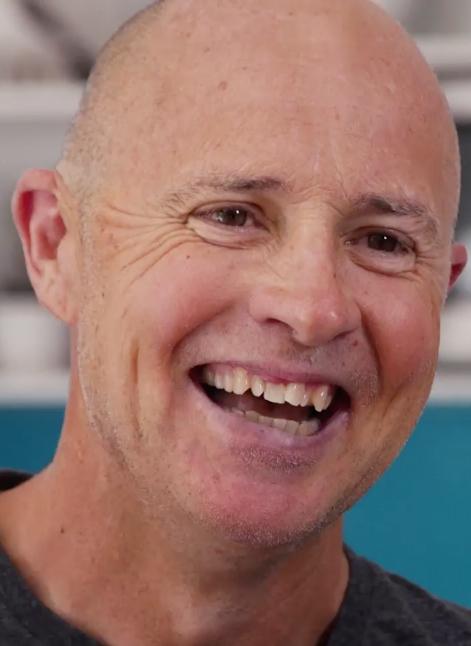
- Born: 23 August 1966
- Died: 6 February 2019 (aged 52); Tairua, New Zealand
- Occupation: Celebrity Builder
- Years active: 1998–2019
- Spouse: Dana Coote (m. 2017–2019)
- Children: 3

John Mark Cocks (23 August 1966 – 6 February 2019), also known as 'Cocksy', was a New Zealand celebrity builder and television presenter. He was most notable for working on the My House My Castle series in the 1990s for New Zealand's TV2. Throughout the late 1990s and early 2000s, Cocks was a prominent face on New Zealand television as Cocksy, New Zealand's favourite tradesman.

== Television career ==
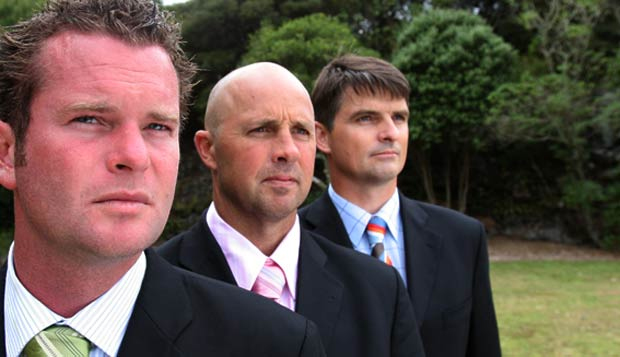
Hamish Dodd, Cocks and Robert Harte on My House My Castle in 2009

Cocks started his career in television in the late 1990s. His prominent role on television is a builder and renovator, though he has worked on other projects that are not related to building in his career. One of the earliest TV shows that he appeared on was April's Angels. He appeared on this show alongside April Ieremia in 1998. After this Cocks then started appearing on the popular New Zealand home renovation TV show My House My Castle as the building consultant and builder. This show ran from 1999 until 2009.

During the early 2000s, Cocks also appeared on several reality shows including City Celebrity Country Nobody and Celebrity Treasure Island to which he won on Season One of the show.

Cocks was also the voice and face of the Carters Building Supplies commercials in the early 2000s. Cocks appeared on television again in 2013 for the TV show How Did You Do That? alongside Amy Schaeffer and later in 2015 on My Dream Room: Kids Edition with television and radio host Mel Homer.

== Television work ==
- April's Angels (1998)
- My House My Castle (1999–2009)
- City Celebrity Country Nobody (2004)
- Celebrity Treasure Island (2005)
- Cocksys Day Off (2005)
- Jack of All Trades (2008)
- My Dream Room: Kids Edition (2015)
- How Did You Do That? (2013–2017)

== Personal life ==
In June 2017, Cocks married Dana Coote; he had three daughters from a previous marriage.

In 2016, Cocks was diagnosed with renal cancer, and he died on 6 February 2019.
