= Celebrity Treasure Island 2021 =

- Season 5
- Presented by: Matt Chisholm; Bree Tomasel
- No. of days: 27
- No. of castaways: 21
- Winners: Chris Parker (Rainbow Youth)
- Runners-up: Edna Swart; Lance Savali
- Location: Ngataki, Northland
- No. of episodes: 27

Release
- Original network: TVNZ 2 TVNZ OnDemand
- Original release: September 6 – November 3, 2021

Season chronology
- ← Previous; 2019 Next → 2022

Celebrity Treasure Island 2021 is the 11th season overall, and the fifth celebrity season of the New Zealand reality-television series Treasure Island. After a break in 2020 due to the COVID-19 pandemic, the fifth edition of Celebrity Treasure Island was filmed in the summer of 2021 on an island off the coast of Ngataki, in Northland, New Zealand, instead of the usual location, Fiji. The season premiered on 6 September, and airs weekly, Monday to Wednesday, at 7:30 PM on TVNZ 2. Matt Chisholm and Bree Tomasel returned as hosts. 21 new celebrity castaways take part on home soil, going head-to-head for the chance to win NZ$100,000 for their chosen charity.

Chris Parker was the sole Katipō member left, and the eventual winner, who took $100,000 for Rainbow Youth. Edna Swart and Lance Savali were the other two finalists. This season raised $215,000 across 13 various charities across Aotearoa.

== Castaways ==
The 21 celebrities were initially separated into three tribes with te reo Māori names based on fauna of New Zealand: Honu (green sea turtle), Katipō (a spider) and Repo (stingray), including the merged tribe as Tohoraha (a Eubalaena australis whale).

Team Honu consisted of "The Legends" of sports and television, Team Katipō (a spider) are "The Jokers" and Team Repo consist of "The Bosses" known for their successful businesses. On Day 7 there was a tribal shuffle which left one person a minority in their new tribe. On Day 14, the winning captain was able to move a team member from Repo to Katipō. Final 8 merged as one after Day 20 elimination challenge. Day 25 was the first double elimination since the 2007 series. The final treasure hunt is located in Kapowairua.

Castaways of Celebrity Treasure Island Season 2021
Castaways	Original tribe	Switched tribe	Kidnap tribe	Merged tribe	Finish	Charity prize raised
Chris Parker (Note: Chris Parker was removed from Repo to Katipo on Day 14.); 29, Comedian; Chosen Charity: Rainbow Youth Inc	Katipō	Repo	Katipō	Tohoraha	Winner; Won Treasure Hunt; Day 27	$100,000 + $7,500
Edna Swart; 31, Entrepreneur/Influencer; Chosen Charity: The Stroke Foundation	Repo	Repo	Repo	Tohoraha	Runner-up; Lost Treasure Hunt; Day 27	$10,000
Lance Savali; 29, International Dancer/Choreographer; Chosen Charity: The Heart Foundation	Repo	Repo	Repo	Tohoraha	Runner-up; Lost Treasure Hunt; Day 27	$5,000
Sir Wayne "Buck" Shelford; 63, Former All Blacks Captain; Chosen Charity: Te Kiwi Maia	Honu	Repo	Repo	Tohoraha	16th Eliminated; Lost Duel; Day 26	$5,000
Candy Lane; 61, Dance Icon; Chosen Charity: Endometriosis New Zealand	Repo	Repo	Repo	Tohoraha	14th Eliminated; Lost Duel; Day 25	$10,000
Jess Tyson; 28, Former Miss World New Zealand/Reporter; Chosen Charity: Brave	Repo	Katipō	Katipō	Tohoraha	14th Eliminated; Lost Duel; Day 25	$20,000
Anna Simcic; 49, Olympian; Chosen Charity: I Am Hope	Honu	Katipō	Katipō	Tohoraha	13th Eliminated; Lost Duel; Day 23	$10,000
Brynley Stent; 31, Actor/Comedian; Chosen Charity: Leukaemia & Blood Cancer NZ	Katipō	Repo	Repo	Tohoraha	12th Eliminated; Lost Duel; Day 22	$7,500
Lana Searle; 34, More FM Host; Chosen Charity: Ngāti Kurī, 4th Gen	Katipō	Katipō	Katipō		11th Eliminated; Lost Duel; Day 20	$10,000
Angela Bloomfield; 48, Shortland Street Icon; Chosen Charity: PolyEmp	Honu	Katipō	Katipō		10th Eliminated; Lost Duel; Day 18	$5,000
Joe Daymond; 25, Comedian; Chosen Charity: Movember NZ	Katipō	Repo	Repo		9th Eliminated; Lost Duel; Day 17	$15,000
Kimberley Crossman; 31, Actor/Comedian; Chosen Charity: RNZSPCA	Katipō	Repo	Repo		8th Eliminated; Lost Duel; Day 15	N/A
Richie Barnett; 49, Former Kiwi League Captain; Chosen Charity: Sports Implementation Foundation	Honu	Katipō	Katipō		7th Eliminated; Lost Duel; Day 14	$5,000
JJ Fong; 35, Actress; Chosen Charity: Leukaemia & Blood Cancer NZ	Katipō	Repo			6th Eliminated; Lost Duel; Day 11	N/A
Art Green; 33, TV Host/Entrepreneur; Chosen Charity: Surf Life Saving New Zealand	Repo	Katipō			5th Eliminated; Lost Duel; Day 9	N/A
Tammy Davis; 45, Actor/George FM Host; Chosen Charity: Love Somebody	Honu	Katipō			4th Eliminated; Lost Duel; Day 8	N/A
Tegan Yorwarth (Note: Tegan Yorwarth was removed from the competition due to an injury); 25, Mai FM Host; Chosen Charity: The Period Place	Repo	Katipō			Withdrew; Medically Evacuated; Day 8	N/A
Huriana Manuel; 34, Former Black Ferns; Chosen Charity: Starship Hospital	Honu				3rd Eliminated; Lost Duel; Day 6	$5,000
Johnny Tuivasa-Sheck; 25, Former Warrior/Entertainer; Chosen Charity: Le Va	Katipō				2nd Eliminated; Lost Duel; Day 5	N/A
Joe Naufahu (Note: Joe Naufahu withdrew from competition to be with his unwell mom); 43, Actor; Chosen Charity: NZ Breast Cancer Foundation	Repo				Withdrew; Left Competition; Day 3	N/A
Casey Frank; 43, Former Breakers player and Tall Black; Chosen Charity: KidsCan	Honu				1st Eliminated; Lost Duel; Day 2	N/A

== Challenges ==
Day	Individual Charity		Reward	Face-off	Captaincy			Captain Test	Elimination			Eliminated	Ref.
1			Katipō	Repo	Anna	Lana	Lance	Lana					
2	Katipō	Brynley		Repo	Anna	Lana	Lance		Casey	vs.	Brynley	Casey Frank	
3	Honu	Huriana		Repo	Anna	Lana	Lance		Richie	vs.	Kim	~~Kimberley Crossman~~; Joe Naufahu (Note: Joe switch out Kim's elimination and withdrew from the game.)	
4	Repo	Jess		Honu	Anna	Lana	Art	Lana					
5	Katipō	Joe D		Repo	Anna	Lana	Art		Richie	vs.	Johnny	Johnny Tuivasa-Sheck	
6	Honu	Angela		Repo	Anna	Lana	Art		Huriana	vs.	Chris	Huriana Manuel	
7	Repo	Jess		Katipō		Richie	Lance	Richie					
8	Repo	Chris		Repo		Richie	Lance		Tammy	vs.	Candy	Tammy Davis	
9	Katipō	Richie		Katipō		Richie	Lance		Art	vs.	Brynley	Art Green	
10			Katipō (Note: Richie won the individual endurance reward challenge against Edna.)	Repo		Jess	Lance	Lance					
11	Repo	Edna		Repo		Jess	Lance		Lana	vs.	JJ	JJ Fong	
11	Katipō	Lana (Note: Repo elected Lana as the winner in the Talent show.)		Repo		Jess	Lance		Lana	vs.	JJ	JJ Fong	
12	Katipō	Jess		Repo		Jess	Lance		Lana	vs.	Edna	~~Lana Searle~~ (Note: Katipō used the mercy card and save Lana from elimination)	
13	Katipō	Anna (Note: Katipō gave Anna the reward scroll from the pirates market.)	P.M. (Note: Pirates Market.)	Repo		Angela	Lance	Angela					
14	Repo	Joe D		Repo		Angela	Lance		Richie	vs.	Buck	Richie Barnett	
15	Katipō	Jess		Repo		Angela	Lance		Anna	vs.	Kim	Kimberley Crossman	
16	Repo	Joe D		Repo		Lana	Lance	Lana					
17	Katipō	Lana		Katipō		Lana	Lance		Jess	vs.	Joe D	Joe Daymond	
18	Repo	Buck		Katipō		Lana	Lance		Angela	vs.	~~Edna~~ (Note: Lance switched Edna with Candy); Candy	Angela Bloomfield	
19	Katipō	Anna		Katipō		Lana	Brynley	Brynley					
20	Repo	Edna		Repo		Lana	Brynley		Lana	vs.	Lance	Lana Searle	
21	Tohoraha	Lance	P.M. (Note: Pirates Market.)	Lance (Note: Face-off winner will choose one person for Day 22 elimination challenge)									
22	Tohoraha	Brynley & Chris		Jess (Note: Face-off winner will choose one person for Day 22 elimination challenge)					Brynley	vs.	~~Buck~~ (Note: Buck switched himself with Edna); Edna	Brynley Stent	
23	Tohoraha	Candy		Lance					Anna	vs.	Buck	Anna Simcic	
24	Tohoraha	Candy	Chris	Lance									
Day	Reward	Face-off	Elimination									Eliminated	Ref.
25		Chris & Lance	Buck & Edna				vs.	Candy & Jess				Candy Lane	
25		Chris & Lance	Buck & Edna				vs.	Candy & Jess				Jess Tyson	
26	Buck & Edna	Chris & Lance	Buck				vs.	Edna				Wayne "Buck" Shelford	
27			Chris			vs.	Edna	vs.	Lance			Edna Swart	
27			Chris			vs.	Edna	vs.	Lance			Lance Savali	

The contestant was eliminated after their first time in the elimination challenge.
The contestant was eliminated after their second time in the elimination challenge.
The contestant was eliminated after their third time in the elimination challenge.
The contestant was eliminated after the fourth or more time in the elimination challenge.

== Episodes ==
No. overall	No. in season	Title	Original release date
19	1	"Day 1"	6 September 2021
Celebrity Treasure Island returns, with a new tribe of celebrities battling it out to take home $100,000 for their chosen charity.: Reward Challenge: Assemble the team banner via 5 obstacle course; Reward Challenge Prize: Best campsite on the island, features two alfresco bedrooms and one bathroom with plumbing and the best fishing with three times the amount of toilet paper than any other camp.; Reward Challenge Winner: Katipō; Face-off Challenge: Statue, Bro?; Face-off Challenge Prize: Canned goods and power to choose a captain for all three teams; Face-off Challenge Winner: Repo; Honu Captain – Anna; Katipō Captain – Lana; Repo Captain – Lance; Captain's Test: Word Change; Captain's Test Prize: A card to allow other team to swapped their players from a challenge.; Captain's Test Winner: Katipō
20	2	"Day 2"	7 September 2021
The first elimination challenge brings a whole new level of pressure, as the three teams of celebrities compete for food, money for their charity, and the right to stay on the island.: Charity Challenge Players: Katipō; Charity Challenge: Wasabi Roullette – Each castaways will be tasting various food and convince the team that they were lying.; Charity Challenge Prize: $5,000 cash for their charity of choice; Charity Challenge Winner: Brynley Stent – Leukaemia & Blood Cancer New Zealand; Face-off Challenge: Melons Obstacles with 99 puzzles.; Face-off Challenge Prize: Breakfast bar and rights to choose any two castaways from any two opposing teams for elimination.; Face-off Challenge Winner: Repo; Elimination Challenge: Build a tower using letter blocks spelling ELIMINATION vertically on a balance beam.; Elimination Challenge Prize: A choice of a clue to the treasure or pirate gold.; Captain's Choices (Repo): Casey Frank (Honu) vs Brynley Stent (Katipō); Elimination Challenge Winner: Brynley Stent (Katipō) and choose a clue.; Eliminated: Casey Frank (Honu)
21	3	"Day 3"	8 September 2021
The pressure of the competition intensifies, and one celebrity weighs up their desire to be here, as they struggle with heartache from home.: Charity Challenge Players: Honu; Charity Challenge: Charity Challenge Prize: $5,000 cash for their charity of choice; Charity Challenge Winner: Huriana Manuel – Starship; Face-off Challenge: Face-off Challenge Prize: Fishing set; Face-off Challenge Winner:Repo; Elimination Challenge: Elimination Challenge Prize: Pirate Gold; Captain's Choices (Repo): Richie Barnett (Honu) vs Kimberley Crossman (Katipō); Elimination Challenge Winner: Richie Barnett (Honu); Withdrew/Eliminated: Joe Naufahu (Repo) took Kimberley Crossman's elimination spot.
22	4	"Day 4"	13 September 2021
The hunger and desperation to win causes alliances to form, and one team finds themselves a target of strategy – one that may prove to pay off.: Charity Challenge Players: Repo; Charity Challenge: In pairs, the guesser the correct phrases from the talker who have a plastic frame in the mouth.; Charity Challenge Prize: $5,000 cash for their charity of choice; Charity Challenge Winner: Jess Tyson – Brave; Face-off Challenge: With a giant slingshot, aim and take out the opposition team's flag; Face-off Challenge Prize: Camp pantry and additional 2 large jars of peanut butter. A change of captaincy for the last place.; Face-off Challenge Winner:Honu; Change of Captaincy: (Repo) from Lance Savali to Art Green; Captain's Test: Guess that quotes posted in Social Media; Captain's Test Prize: Reward steal - steal any opposition's reward following a team face-off challenge.; Captain's Test Winner: Katipō
23	5	"Day 5"	14 September 2021
After an agreement saw victory for one team, a shift in alliances could cause some major cracks in what appeared to be a strong team.: Charity Challenge Players: Katipō; Charity Challenge: Twister Pictionary; Charity Challenge Prize: $5,000 cash for their charity of choice; Charity Challenge Winner: Joe Daymond - Movember; Face-off Challenge: A game of Tag. Each team are required to carry a long bag of sands. First team to get tagged would be eliminated.; Face-off Challenge Prize: Cheese Toasties Cook Set; Face-off Challenge Winner: Repo; Reward Steal: Katipō; Elimination Challenge: Elimination Challenge Prize: Pirate gold.; Captain's Choices (Repo): Richie Barnett (Honu) vs Johnny Tuivasa-Sheck (Katipō); Elimination Challenge Winner: Richie Barnett (Honu); Eliminated: Johnny Tuivasa-Sheck (Katipō)
24	6	"Day 6"	15 September 2021
Feeling threatened, a strong team aims to grow stronger by seeking secret alliances, and the potential of betrayal jeopardises their allegiance.: Charity Challenge Players: Honu; Charity Challenge: Follow the instructions while using props; Charity Challenge Prize: $5,000 cash for their charity of choice; Charity Challenge Winner: Angela Bloomfield – PolyEmp; Face-off Challenge: FAST WORK WINS; Face-off Challenge Prize: Fruity Fantasy plus blueberry muffins; Face-off Challenge Winner:Repo; Elimination Challenge: Pirate Spin Wheel Maze; Elimination Challenge Prize: Pirate Gold; Captain's Choices (Repo): Huriana Manuel (Honu) vs Chris Parker (Katipō); Elimination Challenge Winner: Chris Parker (Katipō); Eliminated: Huriana Manuel (Honu) took Kimberley Crossman's elimination spot.
25	7	"Day 7"	20 September 2021
The teams must adjust to a massive shift in team dynamics, and one team is presented with an advantage that will change the course of the game for good.: Charity Challenge Players: Repo; Charity Challenge: Blindfolded Musical Chairs; Charity Challenge Prize: $5,000 cash for their charity of choice; Charity Challenge Winner: Jess Tyson – Brave; Change of Captaincy: (Katipō) Richie Barnett; Change of Captaincy: (Repo) Lance Savali; Face-off Challenge: Shot 3 points while undergo through rope obstacles.; Face-off Challenge Prize: Burgers and Grills; Face-off Challenge Winner:Katipō; Captain's Test: Fool the captain; Captain's Test Prize: Voting advantages at Repo's next captaincy voting; Captain's Test Winner: Katipō
26	8	"Day 8"	21 September 2021
With a shift in power comes new strategies, and betrayal that blindsides one team could cause a new mutiny as more than one player leaves the game.: Charity Challenge Players: Repo; Charity Challenge: Pass the message; Charity Challenge Prize: $5,000 cash for their charity of choice; Charity Challenge Winner: Chris Parker – Rainbow Youth; Face-off Challenge: Shot 3 points while standing on the pontoons.; Face-off Challenge Prize: Fresh items - fresh eggs, bread, milk, laundry; Face-off Challenge Winner:Katipō; Eliminated/Medical Evacuated: Tegan Yorwarth (Katipō); Elimination Challenge: Maths Puzzles; Elimination Challenge Prize: Pirate Gold; Captain's Choices (Repo): Tammy Davis (Katipō) vs Candy Lane (Repo); Elimination Challenge Winner:Candy Lane (Repo); Eliminated: Tammy Davis (Katipō)
27	9	"Day 9"	22 September 2021
With allegiances threatening to split the teams, one captain makes a bold decision to capitalize on their opponent's weakness, and it backfires.: Charity Challenge Players: Katipō; Charity Challenge: Round 1 - Placing the straw into the glass bottle. Round 2 - Walk a distance with a glass full of cold tea on their forehead.; Charity Challenge Prize: $5,000 cash for their charity of choice; Charity Challenge Winner: Richie Barnett – Sports Implementation Foundation; Face-off Challenge: Taki on the puzzle wall. Once all pieces on the floor, team required to rebuild it.; Face-off Challenge Prize: Team Raid of another campsite; Face-off Challenge Winner: Katipō; Elimination Challenge: Vertical Maze with 3 balls win.; Elimination Challenge Prize: Pirate gold.; Captain's Choices (Katipo): Art Green (Katipō) vs Brynley Stent (Repo); Elimination Challenge Winner:Brynley Stent (Repo); Eliminated: Art Green (Katipō)
28	10	"Day 10"	27 September 2021
A leader fights for redemption after a bold decision backfired. Meanwhile, the wahine form alliances and one team enjoys a prize of pies and sausage rolls.: Face-off Challenge: Each team on either side of large wall with a hole in it. Each team's selected shooter fire the balls from a giant slingshot through the hole in the wall. Other team members need to feed their shooters any missed or opposition balls. The First team to have no balls on their side of the arena for 10 seconds wins. The losing team losing their captaincy.; Face-off Challenge Prize: Boredom busters games plus pies and sausage rolls.; Face-off Challenge Winner: Repo; Change of Captaincy: (Katipō) Jess Tyson; Captain's Test: Kumara in the box -; Captain's Test Prize: A clue to the treasure chest (CAPTAIN'S RIGHT TO PICK); Captain's Test Winner: Repo; Individual Endurance Challenge: Stay under the bar for a few minutes. The bar will be lowered until someone won.; Individual Endurance Challenge Prize: Food Hampers and a bury treasure clue and save someone from elimination.; Team's Choices: Richie Barnett (Katipō) vs Edna Swart (Repo); Individual Endurance Challenge Winner: Richie Barnett (Katipō)
29	11	"Day 11"	28 September 2021
As tensions bubble and secret alliances threaten to take out big players, one celebrity's determination to prove themself backfires.: Charity Challenge Players: Repo; Charity Challenge: Toe Pulley - Using a toe and pulley, castaways need to finish eating the piece the gluten-free bread at the other end of the string. Fastest time wins.; Charity Challenge Prize: $5,000 cash for their charity of choice; Charity Challenge Winner: Edna Swart – The Stroke Foundation; Face-off Challenge: Relay Race; Face-off Challenge Prize: Matinee Performance Audience and refreshments of club sandwiches, popcorn and frizzydrink.; Face-off Challenge Winner:Repo; Talent Show Charity Winner: Lana Searle – Ngati Kuri, 4th Gen; Elimination Challenge: Build a puzzle tower -higgest tower wins.; Elimination Challenge Prize: Pirate Gold; Captain's Choices (Repo): Lana Searle (Katipō) vs JJ Fong (Repo); Elimination Challenge Winner:Lana Searle (Katipō); Eliminated: JJ Fong (Repo)
30	12	"Day 12"	29 September 2021
The cracks are starting to show as Katipo leader Richie finds himself on the outside.: Charity Challenge Players: Katipō; Charity Challenge: Banana Dunk - First blow a balloon till it burst, using your mouth, dunk into the bucket and fetch the banana out. Without using the hands, eat the banana. First one empty wins.; Charity Challenge Prize: $5,000 cash for their charity of choice; Charity Challenge Winner: Jess Tyson – Brave; Team Face-off Challenge: Team divided into 3 roles - Instructors, Receivers, Solvers.; Team Face-off Challenge Prize: Ice Cream Sundaes Galore.; Face-off Challenge Winner:Repo; Elimination Challenge: TBA; Elimination Challenge Prize: Pirate Gold; Captain's Choices (Repo): Lana Searle (Katipo) vs Edna Swart (Repo); Elimination Challenge Winner: Edna Swart (Repo); Eliminated: None (Katipō used the mercy card)
31	13	"Day 13"	4 October 2021
The first ever pirate market sees teams put everything on the line. Then, the biggest shock of the game so far threatens to change everything.: Face-off Challenge: Pirate Market Galore; Face-off Challenge Prize: Food sales and scrolls; Scroll #1: $5,000 cash for their charity of choice - Katipo give it to Anna Simcic (Katipō); Scroll #2: Brynley Stent & Chris Parker (Repo); Scroll #3: Edna Stewart (Repo); Face-off Challenge: Noughts & Crosses. The losing team losing their captaincy.; Face-off Challenge Prize: Tim Tam Biscuits; Face-off Challenge Winner: Repo; Change of Captaincy: Angela Bloomfield (Katipō); Captain's Test: Fool the captain; Captain's Test Prize: Captain's Right to pick a member of Repo to Katipō; Captain's Test Winner: Angela Bloomfield (Katipō); Captain's Choice: Chris Parker
32	14	"Day 14"	5 October 2021
Secret truths are revealed and sends a member of team Repo over the edge. And a face off challenge sees a physical force player of Katipo fall victim to injury.: Charity Challenge Players: Repo; Charity Challenge: Grape Toss; Charity Challenge Prize: $5,000 cash for their charity of choice; Charity Challenge Winner: Joe Daymond – Movember NZ; Team Face-off Challenge: Team Face-off Challenge Prize: Pies Galore; Face-off Challenge Winner:Repo; Elimination Challenge: Using 2 poles, stacks five blocks vertically in 10 secs wins.; Elimination Challenge Prize: Pirate Gold; Captain's Choices (Repo): Richie Barnett (Katipō) vs Sir Wayne "Buck" Shelford (Repo); Elimination Challenge Winner: Sir Wayne "Buck" Shelford (Repo); Eliminated: Richie Barnett (Katipō)
33	15	"Day 15"	6 October 2021
A player struggles with the expectations of their new team. Then, a secret plan is revealed, leaving a few players at team Repo blindsided by their captain's decision.: Charity Challenge Players: Katipō; Charity Challenge: Name that celebrity; Charity Challenge Prize: $5,000 cash for their charity of choice; Charity Challenge Winner: Jess Tyson – Brave; Team Face-off Challenge: Team Face-off Challenge Prize: Kiwi BBQ; Face-off Challenge Winner:Repo; Elimination Challenge: Hangman; Elimination Challenge Prize: Pirate Gold; Captain's Choices (Repo): Anna Simcic (Katipō) vs Kimberley Crossman (Repo); Elimination Challenge Winner: Anna Simcic (Katipō); Eliminated: Kimberley Crossman (Repo)
34	16	"Day 16"	11 October 2021
35	17	"Day 17"	12 October 2021
36	18	"Day 18"	13 October 2021

== See also ==
- Survivor NZ
