= Celebrity Treasure Island 2023 =

- Season 7
- Presented by: Bree Tomasel; Jayden Daniels
- No. of days: 18
- No. of castaways: 18
- Winners: James Mustapic (Gender Minorities Aotearoa)
- Runners-up: Courtney Dawson; Turia Schmidt-Peke
- Location: Wānaka, New Zealand
- No. of episodes: 18

Release
- Original network: TVNZ 2 TVNZ+
- Original release: 18 September – 25 October 2023

Season chronology
- ← Previous; Treasure Island 2023 Next → Celebrity Treasure Island 2024

Celebrity Treasure Island 2023 (Celebrity Treasure Island: Te Waipounamu) is the seventh celebrity edition and the 14th season overall of the New Zealand reality-television series Treasure Island which filmed for the first time in Wānaka, Te Waipounamu/South Island while Cyclone Gabrielle affected the North Island in the summer of 2023.

This season premiered on 18 September 2023, and aired weekly, Monday to Wednesday, at 7:30 pm on TVNZ 2 and TVNZ+, hosted by Bree Tomasel and Jayden Daniels.

James Mustapic won the treasure hunt on Day 18, taking $100,000 for Gender Minorities Aotearoa. Courtney Dawson and Turia Schmidt-Peke were the other two finalists. This season raised $170,000 across nine various charities across New Zealand. James was the only person in history who had not competed in any elimination challenge and won the treasure hunt on his first attempt.

== Castaways ==
Eighteen celebrities were separated into two tribes with te reo Māori names based on fauna of New Zealand: Kārearea (New Zealand falcon) and Tohorā (Eubalaena australis), including the merged tribe as Weka (Gallirallus australis).

For the first time in the game's history, the Captain's Coup was introduced. The day's winning team gets to pick a member from the losing team to go up against their captain. If the captain loses, they lose their captaincy, given to their teammate. If they win, they get to keep it.

- Day 1 – Matt was chosen by Kārearea to go against his captain, Matilda. Matilda retained her captaincy.
- Day 4 – James was chosen by Kārearea to go against his captain, Matilda. James won the coup.
- Day 7 – Tohorā chose Eli to go against his captain, Jordan. Eli won the coup.
- Day 8 – Tohorā used the block advantage card against Kārearea, who used the mercy card to save Jordan from elimination.
- Day 10 – Teams entered the face-off, which ended as an individual immunity, and both teams merged. Nick won the first individual face-off.
- Day 16 – Courtney won the face-off and placed herself in the elimination challenge. She won her spot in the final three.

Castaways of Celebrity Treasure Island: Te Waipounamu Season 2023
Castaways	Original Tribe	Switch Tribe	Merged Tribe	Finish	Charity Prize Raised
James Mustapic; 27, Comedian; Chosen Charity: Gender Minorities Aotearoa	Tohorā	Tohorā	Weka	Winner; Won Treasure Hunt; Day 18	$5,000 + $100,000
Courtney Dawson; 34, Comedian; Chosen Charity: Middlemore Foundation	Kārearea	Tohorā	Weka	Runner-up; Lost Treasure Hunt; Day 18	$10,000
Turia Schmidt-Peke; 29, Actor; Chosen Charity: Fonua Ola Network	Tohorā	Kārearea	Weka	Runner-up; Lost Treasure Hunt; Day 18	$5,000
Nick Afoa; 37, Musical Theatre star Chosen Charity: BBM Foundation / Just Move	Kārearea	Tohorā	Weka	15th Eliminated; Lost Duel; Day 17	$7,500
Laura Daniel; 32, Actor/Comedian; Chosen Charity: Shine	Tohorā	Tohorā	Weka	14th Eliminated; Lost Duel; Day 16	N/A
Eli Matthewson; 34, Comedian; Chosen Charity: Burnett Foundation Aotearoa	Kārearea	Kārearea	Weka	13th Eliminated; Lost Duel; Day 15	N/A
Mel Homer; 53, Broadcaster; Chosen Charity: The Aunties	Tohorā	Kārearea	Weka	12th Eliminated; Lost Duel; Day 14	N/A
Steve Price; 49, Rugby League Legend; Chosen Charity: Child Cancer Foundation	Tohorā	Tohorā	Weka	11th Eliminated; Lost Duel; Day 13	$15,000
Jazz Thornton; 28, Mental health advocate Chosen Charity: Voices of Hope	Kārearea	Kārearea	Weka	10th Eliminated; Lost Duel; Day 12	$2,500
Blair Strang; 51, Actor; Chosen Charity: Dementia Foundation	Kārearea	Tohorā	Weka	9th Eliminated; Lost Duel; Day 11	N/A
Matt Gibb; 42, Presenter; Chosen Charity: Cancer Society	Tohorā	Kārearea	Weka	8th Eliminated; Lost Duel; Day 10	$10,000
Miriama Smith; 47, Actor; Chosen Charity: Coastguard	Kārearea	Kārearea		7th Eliminated; Lost Duel; Day 9	$10,000
Jordan Vandermade; 36, Presenter; Chosen Charity: Youthline	Kārearea	Kārearea		6th Eliminated; Lost Duel; Day 8	N/A
Matilda Green; 32, Influencer; Chosen Charity: Variety Children’s Charity	Tohorā			5th Eliminated; Lost Duel; Day 6	N/A
Mary Lambie; 59, Presenter; Chosen Charity: Cure Our Ovarian Cancer	Kārearea			4th Eliminated; Lost Duel; Day 5	N/A
Tāme Iti; 71, Activist/Artist; Chosen Charity: I am Hope	Tohorā			3rd Eliminated; Withdrew; Day 5	N/A
Megan Alatini; 46, True Bliss star Chosen Charity: Women’s Refuge	Kārearea			2nd Eliminated; Lost Duel; Day 3	$5,000
Grant Lobban; 50, Actor; Chosen Charity: Mental Health Foundation	Tohorā			1st Eliminated; Lost Duel; Day 2	N/A

== Challenges ==
Day	Individual Charity		Reward	Face-off	Captaincy		Captain Coup	Elimination			Eliminated	Ref.
1				Kārearea	Jordan	Matilda	Matilda					
2	Tohorā	Steve		Tohorā	Jordan	Matilda		Jazz	vs.	Grant	Grant Lobban	
3	Kārearea	Megan		Tohorā	Jordan	Matilda		Megan	vs.	Mel	Megan Alatini	
4	Tohorā	Matt		Kārearea	Jordan	Matilda	James					
5	Kārearea	Jazz; Nick		Tohorā	Jordan	James		Mary	vs.	Matilda	Mary Lambie	
6	Tohorā	Matt		Kārearea	Jordan	James		Blair	vs.	Matilda	Matilda Green	
7	Kārearea	Miriama		Tohorā	Jordan	James	Eli					
8	Tohorā	Courtney		Tohorā	Eli	James		Jordan	vs.	Nick	Jordan Vandermade (Note: Tohorā used the block advantage card against Kārearea, who used the mercy card to save Jordan from elimination.)	
9	Kārearea	Miriama		Kārearea	Eli	James		Miriama	vs.	Blair	Miriama Smith	
10	Tohorā	James		Nick				Eli	vs.	Matt	Matt Gibb	
11	Weka	Steve		Courtney				Blair	vs.	Steve	Blair Strang	
12	Weka	Nick		Turia				Jazz	vs.	Steve	Jazz Thornton	
13	Weka	Steve		Turia				Mel	vs.	Steve	Steve Price	
14	Weka	Courtney		James				Mel	vs.	Nick	Mel Homer	
15	Weka	Turia		Courtney				Eli	vs.	Laura	Eli Matthewson	
Day	Reward	Face-off	Elimination								Eliminated	Ref.
16		Courtney	Courtney (Note: Courtney won the face-off but placed herself in the elimination challenge and won her spot in the final three.)			vs.		Laura			Laura Daniel	
17	Courtney (Note: Courtney won the endurance challenge against James, and able to steal an advantage card from anyone and she chose Nick.)	James	Nick			vs.		Turia			Nick Afoa	
18			Courtney		vs.	James		vs.	Turia		Courtney Dawson	
18			Courtney		vs.	James		vs.	Turia		Turia Schmidt-Peke	

The contestant was eliminated after their first time in the elimination challenge.
The contestant was eliminated after their second time in the elimination challenge.
The contestant was eliminated after their third time in the elimination challenge.
The contestant was eliminated after the fourth or more time in the elimination challenge.
