= James Mustapic =

New Zealand comedian (born 1995 or 1996)

- Born: 1 December 1995 (age 30); Dunedin, New Zealand
- Education: John McGlashan College
- Occupation: Comedian
- Father: Dan Mustapic

James Mustapic (born 1 December 1995) is a New Zealand comedian and YouTuber. He has created the television shows Abandonment Issues and James Must-a-pic His Mum a Man, has starred in the show Queer Academy, and has been a reporter for Seven Sharp. He won Celebrity Treasure Island 2023.

== Personal life ==
Mustapic was born in Dunedin in 1995. Mustapic's father is former curling champion Dan Mustapic. For most of his childhood James and his sister were raised by their mother alone. He attended John McGlashan College. In 2012 he won the New Zealand International Science Festival 'Science Idol' competition after creating a parody of a Justin Bieber song. The same year he made a Kony 2012 parody on YouTube which won a competition by the Otago School of Business. He moved to Auckland in 2015. Mustapic is gay.

== Career ==
Mustapic commenced his film career by starting a YouTube channel when he was 15. He created the channel Shortland Street Scandal which started by making recaps of television soap Shortland Street episodes. In 2015 he released a song about the show, named "Hold Your Hand in Mine Harry Warner". It was inspired by an interaction between the programme's characters Chris Warner and Harry. He later hosted The Spinoff's webseries Repressed Memories.

Mustapic first started stand-up comedy in 2015. His first solo show was in 2018 at the Dunedin Fringe Festival. In 2019 Mustapic performed stand-up comedy in the show The Blair Witch Projector at the New Zealand International Comedy Festival. He also performed at that festival in 2023.

Mustapic was nominated for the Billy T Award in 2019 and 2021. In 2021 he became a Seven Sharp reporter.

In 2022 Mustapic launched the show Abandonment Issues, in which he tracks down New Zealand celebrities who have decreased in popularity, focussing on iconic television moments of the 2000s. The Spinoff reported that it "tread[s] a very fine line between making fun of his guests and having a laugh with them".

James Mustapic competed in Celebrity Treasure Island 2023, and won. He joked that he planned on being the last blond, white and gay winner as the previous winners Matty McLean and Chris Parker were in that category. The prize money was donated to the charity Gender Minorities Aotearoa. He said that "I was very stressed the whole time on the island, but I hope people know I was also having a delightful time".

In 2023 Mustapic hosted the television show Queer Academy, which was written and directed by Re: News. He has also been on the game show Have You Been Paying Attention? and the comedy panel show Guy Montgomery's Guy Mont-Spelling Bee.

In 2024 Mustapic launched the comedy television show James Must-a-pic His Mum a Man in which he puts his single mother, Janet, on dates. Janet initially did not want to take part in the programme, and said that "I spent a couple of months with my fingers crossed hoping [the programme] would not get funding". One of Janet's dates was politician David Seymour, who became the deputy prime minister in 2025. The programme features other well-known individuals such as entertainer Suzy Cato and comedian Ray O'Leary. One topic in the show is finding Mustapic a new father. Mustapic's father is an "omnipresent villain" in the programme, although he does not make an appearance. His father made a complaint to the Broadcasting Standards Authority against TVNZ, saying that the show unfairly represented him and breached his privacy. The authority upheld the complaint.

In June 2026 Mustapic appeared in a New Zealand celebrity version of the game show Tipping Point.
