= Robert Harte (TV personality) =

New Zealand actor

Robert James Harte
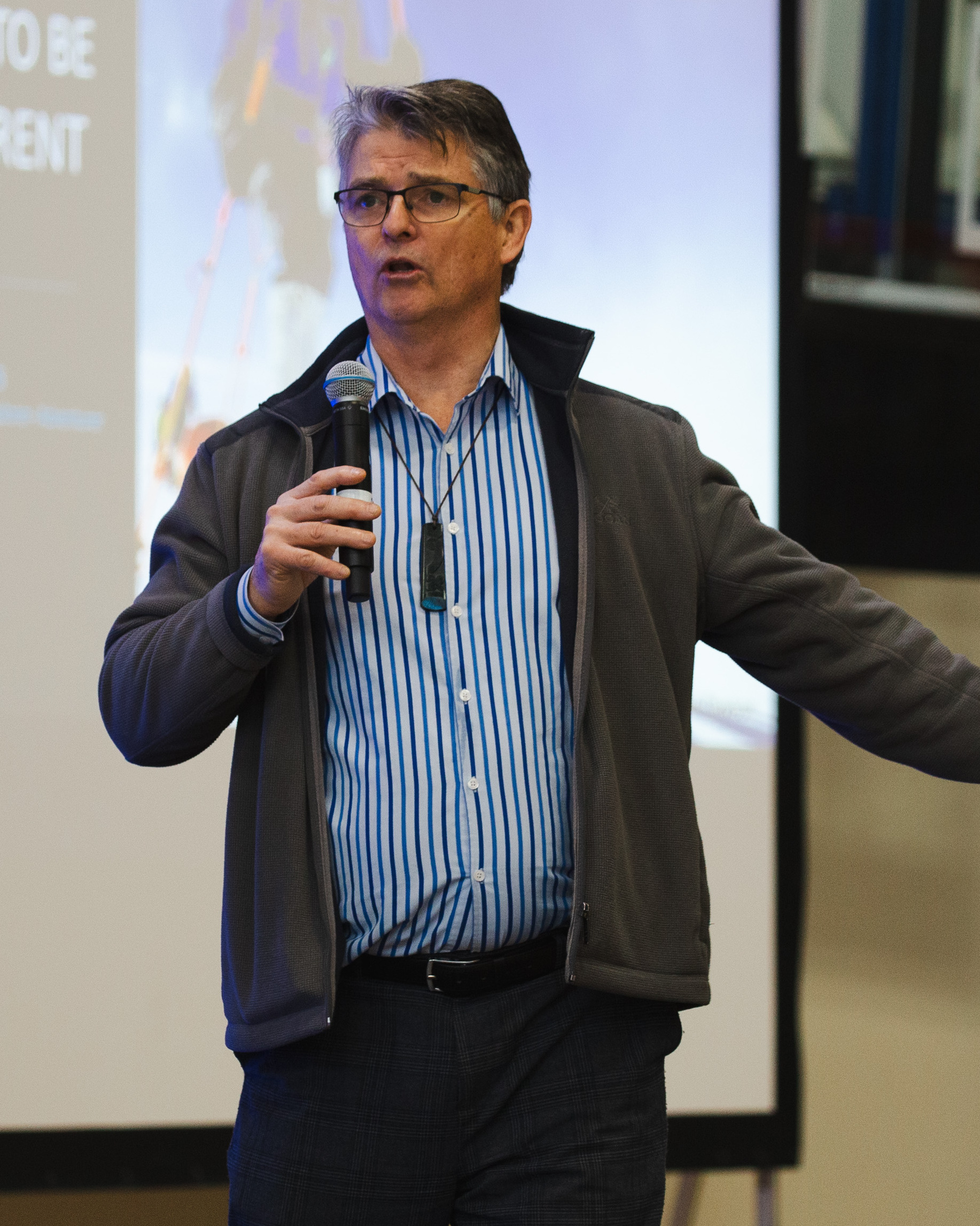
- Harte in 2023
- Born: Wellington, New Zealand
- Occupations: Lawyer, Former Actor & Television personality
- Years active: 1995–2009: Television personality and actor 1989–present: Lawyer

Robert 'Rob' Harte is a New Zealand lawyer, former actor and television personality. Harte is most notable for his work hosting the New Zealand television show My House, My Castle from 1999 until 2009. Harte also played Ryan Birch in Shortland Street, father of Minnie Crozier in 1995 until 1997. He currently resides in Whangārei, New Zealand, where he now works as a lawyer in his own law firm, Rob Harte, Lawyer.

== Career ==
After Harte received his law degree from Otago University he then began his legal career in 1989. His first practice in the field was in Blenheim, New Zealand to then Whangārei.

Harte began his acting career in 1995 with his role as Dax on the TV series Hercules: The Legendary Journeys. He then later appeared on Shortland Street, playing the role of Ryan Birch from 1995 until 1996. During this time he appeared on Xena: Warrior Princess where he played three roles in the series, Goewin, Maphias and Ugly Ruffian. Harte was on the series until 1997.

Harte made an appearance in 1998 on the New Zealand soap opera, City Life. In 1999 he began to host the series My House, My Castle. The series ran until 2009.

Since My House, My Castle Harte hasn't appeared in any television shows but continues to work with his practice as a lawyer in Whangārei.

== Television ==
- Hercules: The Legendary Journeys (1995)
- Shortland Street (1995–1996)
- Xena: Warrior Princess (1995–1997)
- City Life (1998)
- My House, My Castle (1999–2009)

== Personal life ==
Harte resides and lives in Whangārei.

== See also ==
- List of New Zealand television personalities
