= Celebrity Treasure Island 2024 =

- Season 8
- Presented by: Bree Tomasel; Lance Savali
- No. of days: 18
- No. of castaways: 18
- Winner: JP Foliaki
- Runners-up: Christian "Cully" Cullen; James Rolleston
- Location: Mercury Bay, New Zealand
- No. of episodes: 18

Release
- Original network: TVNZ 2 TVNZ+
- Original release: 9 September – 16 October 2024

Season chronology
- ← Previous; Celebrity Treasure Island 2023

Celebrity Treasure Island 2024 is the eighth celebrity edition and the 15th season overall of the New Zealand reality-television series Treasure Island which filmed for the first time in Mercury Bay, Coromandel Peninsula, North Island in the summer of 2024.

This season premiered on September 9, 2024, and aired weekly, Monday to Wednesday, at 7:30 PM on TVNZ 2 and TVNZ+, hosted by Bree Tomasel and former contestant Lance Savali.

== Castaways ==
Eighteen celebrities were separated into two tribes with te reo Māori names based on fauna of New Zealand: Aihe (Dolphin) and Wētā (Anostostomatidae), including the merged tribe as Kōura (Crayfish).

- Day 1 – JP was chosen by Wētā to go against his captain, Suzanne. Suzanne retained her captaincy.
- Day 3 – Millen was chosen by Wētā to go against his captain, Suzanne. Millen won the coup.
- Day 6 – Carmel & Spankie chose Duncan & Aidee to switch to Team Aihe with JP & Tāmati. Mea was immune from the elimination as a neutral player and later switched to Weta after Tāmati's elimination.
- Day 7 – JP was chosen by Aihe to go against his captain, Wairangi. Wairangi retained his captaincy.

Castaways of Celebrity Treasure Island 2024
Castaways	Original Tribe	Switched Tribe	Merged Tribe	Finish	Charity Prize Raised	Ref.
JP Foliaki; 30, Actor; Chosen Charity: Childfund – Water Run	Aihe	Wētā	Kōura	Winner; Won Treasure Hunt; Day 18	$5,000 + $100,000	
Christian "Cully" Cullen; 48, All Blacks legend Chosen Charity: Brain Tumour Support	Aihe	Aihe	Kōura	Runners-up; Lost Treasure Hunt; Day 18	$5,000	
James Rolleston; 27, Actor; Chosen Charity: Brake New Zealand	Wētā	Wētā	Kōura	Runners-up; Lost Treasure Hunt; Day 18	$2,500	
Sieni "Bubbah" Leo'o Olo; 28, Comedian; Chosen Charity: Pillars Ka Pou Whakahou	Aihe	Aihe	Kōura	15th Eliminated; Lost Duel; Day 17	$2,500	
Duncan Garner; 50, Broadcaster; Chosen Charity: The Cancer Society of New Zealand	Wētā	Aihe	Kōura	13th/14th Eliminated; Lost Duel; Day 16	$5000	
Millen "Millsy" Baird; 51, Actor; Chosen Charity: Taranaki Retreat	Aihe	Aihe	Kōura	13th/14th Eliminated; Lost Duel; Day 16	$10,000	
Gaby Solomona; 33, Actor; Chosen Charity: Taime Pasifika Cancer Support	Wētā	Wētā	Kōura	11th/12th Eliminated; Lost Duel; Day 14	$10,000	
Wairangi Koopu; 44, Former Warrior; Chosen Charity: HUHA – Helping You Help Animals Trust	Wētā	Wētā	Kōura	11th/12th Eliminated; Lost Duel; Day 14	$10,000	
Michelle "Mickey" Langstone; 45, Actor; Chosen Charity: Tōtara Hospice	Aihe	Aihe	Kōura	10th Eliminated; Lost Duel; Day 12	$10,000	
Carmel Sepuloni; 47, Former Deputy PM; Chosen Charity: TYLA – Turn Your Life Around	Wētā	Wētā	Kōura	9th Eliminated; Lost Duel; Day 10	N/A	
Janaye Henry; 27, Comedian; Chosen Charity: The Aunties	Aihe	Aihe		8th Eliminated; Lost Duel; Day 9	$5,000	
Mea Motu; 34, Boxer; Chosen Charity: I am Hope	Aihe	Wētā		7th Eliminated; Withdrew; Day 10	N/A	
Aidee Walker; 43, Actor-Director; Chosen Charity: Relief Aid	Wētā	Aihe		6th Eliminated; Lost Duel; Day 8	N/A	
Spankie Jackzon; 39, Drag Superstar; Chosen Charity: Arohanui Hospice	Wētā	Wētā		5th Eliminated; Withdrew; Day 8	$5,000	
Tāmati Coffey; 44, Former Politician/Broadcaster; Chosen Charity: Fertility New Zealand	Aihe	Wētā		4th Eliminated; Lost Duel; Day 6	N/A	
Suzanne Paul; 66, Infomercial queen 2003, Chosen Charity: SPCA NZ	Aihe			3rd Eliminated; Lost Duel; Day 5	N/A	
Casey Kopua; 39, Silver Ferns legend Chosen Charity: Lunches in Schools	Wētā			2nd Eliminated; Lost Duel; Day 3	N/A	
Vinnie Woolston; 39, International Model; Chosen Charity: Te Kōhanga Reo	Wētā			1st Eliminated; Lost Duel; Day 2	N/A	

== Challenges ==
Day	Individual Charity		Reward		Face-off	Captaincy		Captain Coup	Elimination					Eliminated	Ref.
1			Wētā	Wairangi	Wētā	Suzanne	Wairangi	Suzanne							
2	Wētā	Spankie			Wētā	Suzanne	Wairangi		Bubbah	vs.			Vinnie	Vinnie Woolston	
3	Aihe	Janaye			Aihe	Suzanne	Wairangi		Millen	vs.			Casey	Casey Kopua	
4	Wētā	Wairangi			Wētā	Millen	Wairangi	Millen							
5	Aihe	Michelle			Wētā	Millen	Wairangi		Suzanne	vs.			James	Suzanne Paul	
6					Wētā	Millen	Wairangi		Michelle	vs.			Tāmati	Tāmati Coffey	
7	Wētā	JP			Aihe	Millen	Wairangi	Wairangi							
8	Aihe	Michelle			Aihe	Millen	Wairangi		Aidee	vs.			Carmel	Aidee Walker	
9	Wētā	Gaby			NONE (Note: Face-off was cancelled due to severe weather,Mea was medically withdrawn from the game, and each Captain chose one member for the elimination challenge.)	Millen	Wairangi		Janaye	vs.			James	Janaye Henry	
10	Aihe	Millen			Christian				Carmel	vs.			Wairangi	Carmel Sepuloni	
11	Kōura	Millen			Wairangi				Michelle	vs.			Millen	~~Michelle Langstone~~ (Note: Michelle used the Mercy card to save herself from the elimination.)	
12	Kōura	Christian			Wairangi				Michelle	vs.			Millen	Michelle Langstone	
13	Kōura	Wairangi			Wairangi				James	vs.			Wairangi (Note: Wairangi volunteer himself for the elimination.)	~~James Rolleston~~ (Note: James used the Mercy card to save himself from the elimination.)	
14	Kōura	Gaby			James				Gaby	vs.	Millen	vs.	Wairangi	Gaby Solomona	
14	Kōura	Gaby			James				Gaby	vs.	Millen	vs.	Wairangi	Wairangi Koopu	
15	Kōura	JP			Duncan										
Day	Face-off					Elimination								Eliminated	Ref.
16	Bubbah (Note: Duncan assigned the pairs. Bubbah won the face-off and her spot in the final four against Duncan.)		Christian (Note: Duncan assigned the pairs. Christian won the face-off and his spot in the final four against JP.)		James (Note: Duncan assigned the pairs. James won the face-off and his spot in the final four against Millen.)	Duncan		vs.	JP		vs.	Millen		Duncan Garner	
16	Bubbah		Christian		James	Duncan		vs.	JP		vs.	Millen		Millen Baird	
17	James (Note: James won the first face-off and his spot in the final.)		JP (Note: JP won the second face-off and his spot in the final.)			Bubbah		vs.	Christian					Sieni "Bubbah" Leo'o Olo	

The contestant was eliminated after their first time in the elimination challenge.
The contestant was eliminated after their second time in the elimination challenge.
The contestant was eliminated after their third time in the elimination challenge.
The contestant was eliminated after the fourth or more time in the elimination challenge.
