= David McNee (interior designer) =

New Zealand interior designer and television personality (1947–2003)

McNee in 1998

William David McNee (born 1948/1949 - 20 July 2003) was a New Zealand interior designer and television personality.

McNee began his career as an interior designer in the 1970s. There he helped decorate Vogel House in Lower Hutt during the time that Sir Robert Muldoon was staying there. He briefly was a real state agent which then made him continue helping with interior design shortly after.

McNee went to America for several years to then coming back to New Zealand. He then appeared on New Zealand's My House, My Castle television show as one of the interior designers for the series. He also appeared on the television show Changing Rooms.

In July 2003 McNee was murdered at his home by 24-year-old Phillip Layton Edwards in St Marys Bay, Auckland.

== Personal life ==
McNee was openly gay. At the time of this death McNee lived with his two dogs, Felix and Jasper.

== Murder ==
On the evening of 20 July 2003, Phillip Layton Edwards, a 24-year-old homeless sex worker recently released from prison 11 days prior, was walking along K Road in central Auckland. McNee, who was driving a convertible, approached Edwards. After a conversation, Edwards agreed to perform a sexual act in exchange for money. In financial need, Edwards consented to accompany McNee to his home for a shower. During their time at McNee's residence in St Marys Bay, further sexual activity took place.

At some point, Edwards became violent and assaulted McNee, striking him multiple times in the head and face. Edwards later testified that he had lost control and that the incident became a blur. Following the attack, Edwards covered McNee's body with a blanket, robbed the house of money, alcohol, and the convertible, and then fled. Forensic experts reported that McNee was struck approximately 30 to 40 times and that the severity of the assault meant he likely survived only a short time after the attack stopped. His body was found two days later, naked and left with a blanket around his body, with his head severely bashed. McNee choked to death from the injuries while being unconscious. Edwards said his motive for killing him was because McNee thought he was gay, causing Edwards to attack him.

Edwards was sentenced to nine years for the killing of McNee in 2004. He was released from prison in 2012. Edwards was later sentenced to an additional three years in 2015 for the kidnapping of a two-year-old boy in Panmure, Auckland which took place in August 2013. At the sentencing he also charged for assaulting a female and for unlawfully taking a vehicle. Following his death both of McNee's dogs Felix and Jasper were euthanised and then buried with McNee.

== See also ==
- Gay panic defense
