= My House My Castle =

- Starring: Hayley Sproull; Shanta Trusewich; Mike Smith; Hamish Dodd; John 'Cocksy' Cocks ✝ David McNee ✝
- Country of origin: New Zealand
- Original language: English

Production
- Running time: 30 minutes (with commercials)

Original release
- Network: TV2 TV3
- Release: 2001 – present

My House My Castle is a New Zealand television reality show that helped New Zealand homeowners sort out issues related to their homes such as real estate agents and financing.

Also, a room was renovated each week and each episode ends with a finalist in the "Castle of the Year Competition". It aired on Monday nights at 8 pm on TV2.

A 2026 reboot was hosted by comedian Hayley Sproull, joined by interior designer Shanta Trusewich and builder Mike Smith . It aired on TV3 Wednesday nights at 7.30pm and on-demand on ThreeNOW.
