= Tanya Pouwhare =

Tanya Pouwhare (born in Blenheim, New Zealand) is a New Zealand former radio and television personality. Currently she is a New Zealand business executive who has been recognised for her leadership and strong advocacy for sustainable ethical labor practices in NZ.

She started her radio career at Coastal FM, in Kaikōura at the age of 15, a summer station run by independent Sounds FM. After leaving Marlborough Girls' college she joined Marlborough's local Iwi Radio Station Wairua FM, before moving back to the more commercially run Sounds FM in 1991. She moved to Energy FM in New Plymouth in 1993, one of the RadioWorks stable of provincial stations managed by Don Raine and Steven Joyce. In 1996, she moved to Palmerston North to work for The Radio Network station Classic Hits. Pouwhare has also worked for radio stations The Edge FM, The Rock FM, Solid Gold FM and Radio Pacific.

Pouwhare moved to television production in 2001 mostly as production manager. With Touchdown Television she was a contestant in Treasure Island a reality competition television franchise a show in 1999 winning the second series making her the first woman in the world to win a survival reality show, doing so weeks before Tina Wesson won the American show Survivor. In 2004, she became a senior television production manager at Greenstone TV with credits including Crash Investigation Unit and Highway Patrol for Australia's Channel Seven.

Tanya was also a recurring supporting role in New Zealand's children's comedy drama series The Amazing Extraordinary Friends. She appeared as satirical newsreader Dana Dinkley in all three series.

Pouwhare moved to Australia in 2009, to production manage a number of shows and departments for the Australian Broadcasting Corporation (ABC) There she worked in the Indigenous Department making Message Stick a show makes topical contemporary Indigenous programming. The live broadcasts of Australia's ANZAC Day Parade filmed live from Sydney & Anzac Cove on the Gallipoli Peninsula, and Australia Day commemorations in Canberra.. And she also production managed ABC's Multiplatform Department which included iView, producing digital content and online streaming for the ABC.

In 2014 she moved back to Marlborough and left the radio and television sector. She is now the General Manager of Grapeworx Marlborough Ltd and Deputy Chair and Human Rights Lead of NZ Ethical Employers (NZEE), where she champions fair employment practices. Her work at NZEE involved restructuring the organization as the then CEO, to enhance ethical standards in New Zealand’s primary industries. She is sought-after globally to commentate on the Recognised Seasonal Employer (RSE) Scheme, a limited work visa program under New Zealand Immigration on matters related to labor practices and policy within the viticulture and horticulture industries.

In addition to her operational and governance roles, Pouwhare is an active advocate for people-first leadership, which emphasizes the importance of fair and sustainable labor practices through frameworks such as UN Guiding Principles on Business and Human Rights and OECD Due Diligence Guidance for Responsible Business Conduct. She has been recognised for contributing to setting industry-wide ethical employment standards.
