= Live Ocean =

New Zealand conservation charity

Live Ocean is a New Zealand registered ocean conservation charity founded by Olympic gold and silver medalists Peter Burling and Blair Tuke. Live Ocean's mission is to amplify and accelerate ocean action in New Zealand. Live Ocean partners with people and projects on marine science and conservation initiatives. Live Ocean relies on donations, which directly support initiatives for ocean health and action in New Zealand.

== Activities ==
Live Ocean's initial project focused on The Race To Save the Endangered Antipodean Albatross, which remains one of their flagship efforts. The charity also supports efforts to monitor and restore populations of the New Zealand sea lion, one of the rarest sea lion species in the world, in partnership with local marine biologists.

=== Hauraki Gulf ===
In March 2021, Live Ocean launched an online video series focused on the conservation of the Hauraki Gulf in the Auckland Region of New Zealand. The initiative aligned with a broader objective of achieving 30 percent protection of the Gulf by 2030, a target supported by international scientific recommendations.

The organisation later expressed support for expanded protection measures for the Hauraki Gulf, announced by the New Zealand government on 22 June 2021.

In April 2024, Auckland resident Jono Ridler, with support from Live Ocean, completed a continuous ultra-distance open water swim from Karaka Bay on Aotea Great Barrier Island to Narrow Neck Beach in Auckland. Covering approximately 100 kilometres, the swim was described as record-breaking and was presented as drawing attention to environmental concerns affecting the Hauraki Gulf.

=== Citizen Science and Digital Tools ===
In 2024, Live Ocean launched digital tools to enhance the Marine Metre Squared citizen science project. This initiative empowers communities to monitor local coastal biodiversity, encouraging stewardship and action.

Live Ocean also introduced the "Citizens of the Sea" project, which enables sailors to contribute to marine conservation by collecting environmental DNA (eDNA) and other data to map biodiversity and monitor climate change impacts.

== Live Ocean Racing ==
In addition to its conservation work, Live Ocean established Live Ocean Racing, an independent sailing team aligned with its ocean health mission. The team competes globally and uses the platform to advocate for ocean conservation.

In 2024, Live Ocean Racing participated in the ETF26 Series, with New Zealander Liv Mackay as skipper, supported by Leonard Takahashi and Oscar Gunn. The team competed in events across Spain, France, and Italy.

== Funding and Support ==
Live Ocean relies on public donations to fund its projects. Donations are directed towards marine conservation efforts, ensuring that 100 percent of funds go to support ocean action in New Zealand.
