= Matty McLean =

New Zealand TV presenter (born 1986)

- Born: Matthew Bruce McLean; 29 September 1986 (age 40)
- Years active: 2007–present
- Television: Breakfast

Matthew Bruce McLean (born 29 September 1986) is a New Zealand journalist and television presenter. He previously presented Breakfast, and was a 1News reporter. He has also worked on the television programmes Seven Sharp, 20/20 and Close Up.

== Television ==
In 2007, McLean, aged 20, started working at Breakfast. He has also worked on 1News, Close Up, 20/20 and Seven Sharp. On 8 April 2016, he left TVNZ to travel overseas. He returned to Breakfast in 2017.

In an interview in 2018 McLean said that the he writes his weather scripts and broadcasts on Breakfast between 6 am and 9 am. In 2020, when presenting Breakfast, McLean left mid-show after realising that he got the times wrong for a flight to Nelson. He thought that the flight time was 10:45 am, but it was actually at 9:25 am. In 2022 McLean, who is gay, started the podcast Out The Gayte with two other gay men who are members of the NZ Falcons Auckland rugby club. It discusses gay issues and is adults-only.

In 2023, McLean accidentally dropped an "f-bomb" live while presenting Breakfast, after thinking that the programme was on an advertisement break. He also let out a "c-bomb" on the same show in 2017 after attempting to say the word "country".

In 2023, McLean was the winning contestant on the Fans vs Faves season of the reality television show, Treasure Island. He won $60,000 from the series, and donated it to Zeal Education Trust. On 5 October 2023 on Breakfast, he and Chris Chang wore the same outfit. The two also completed each other's sentences to act as twins. McLean announced on the Breakfast episode on 20 November 2023 that he would leave the show in the last episode of 2023. He then became a host of The Hits drive show.

== Personal life ==
McLean was born on 29 September 1986, and was educated at Wakatipu High School. He also attended the New Zealand Broadcasting School at Christchurch Polytechnic Institute of Technology. As he approached high school age, McLean realised that he was attracted to men. It was "a long time after that" when he came out as gay. A friend helped him come out to his mother. He was the first married gay man to appear on the cover of Woman's Day magazine.

He got married on 31 December 2022 on Muriwai Beach, after being proposed to by his husband, Ryan Teece, in February of the same year. They met on Tinder in 2015, but it was only in 2017 when they met in person. In 2023 McLean said on his podcast Out the Gayte that the two were considering starting a family. In 2012, before same-sex marriage was legal, McLean made a personal plea to Parliament to legalise it. In 2023 Teece became an ambassador of Auckland Thoroughbred Racing and starred in a television show.

McLean became a wedding celebrant in 2014.
