= Courtney Dawson =

New Zealand comedian and actor

- Born: 1988 or 1989 (age 37–38); Ōtāhuhu, New Zealand
- Occupations: Comedian; actor

Courtney Dawson is a Māori comedian from New Zealand. She and her father Heta perform as the comedy duo Half and Hāwhe.

== Early life and education ==
Dawson was born at Middlemore Hospital and raised in South Auckland. She is of Māori heritage, tracing her roots to the Ngāti Kurī and Waikato Tainui iwis.

== Career ==
Dawson's first comedy gig was at Manurewa AFC.

Dawson co-hosted Rags are Riches and has appeared on Have You Been Paying Attention?, Guy Montgomery's Guy Mont-Spelling Bee, My Favorite Dead Person, and 7 Days. In 2023 she was on Paddy Gower Has Issues.

In 2022, Dawson won the award for Outstanding Individual Performance Comedy at the Auckland Fringe Festival for her show Shoes Off (at the door). She and Becky Umbers performed Becky and Courtney Do Business at the 2023 Melbourne International Comedy Festival.

== Personal life ==
Dawson has a son. Her favourite book is The Autobiography of Malcolm X and she enjoys yoga.
