= Rainbow Youth =

New Zealand LGBTQIA+ non-profit organisation

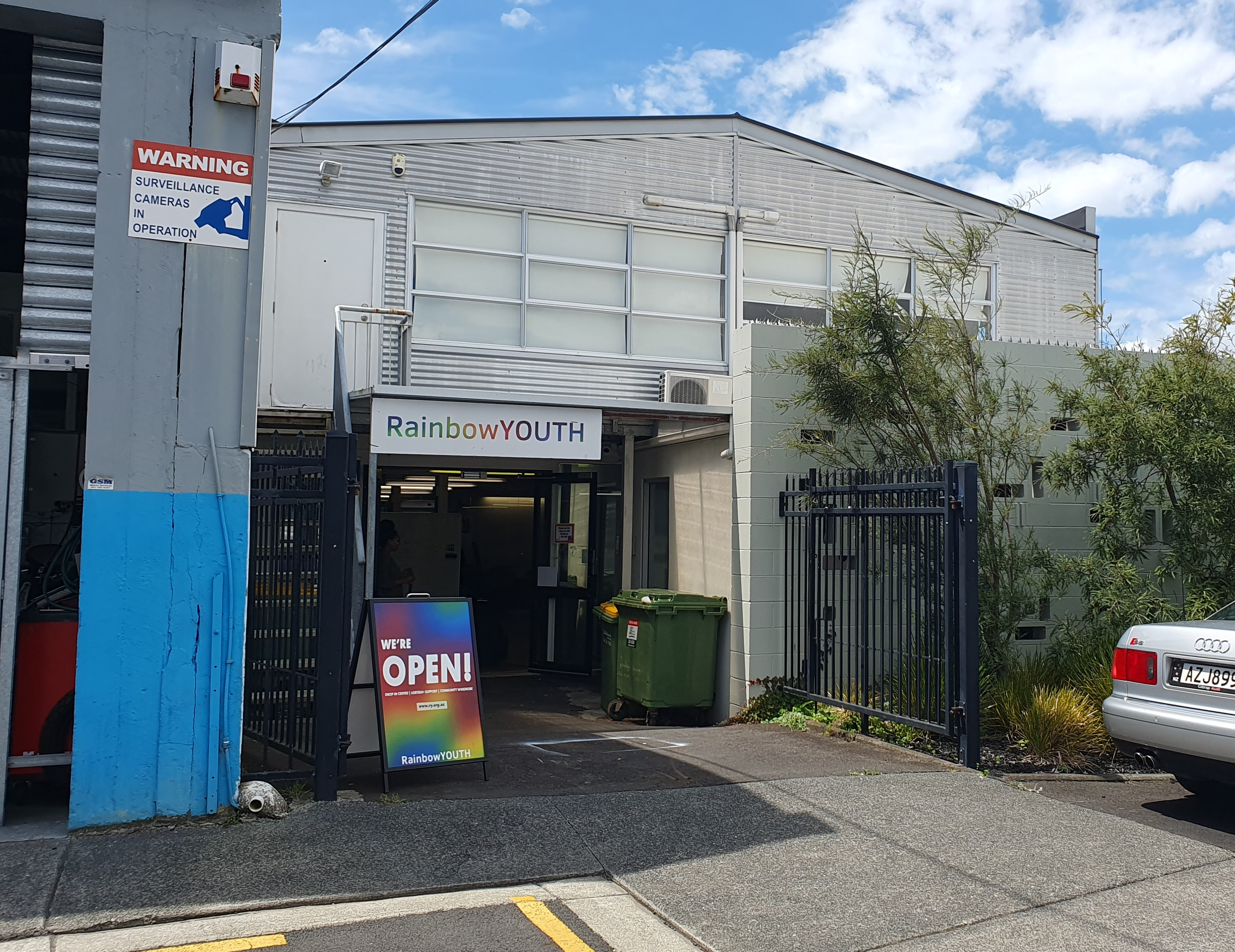
Rainbow Youth Auckland Drop-in Centre

Rainbow Youth (stylised RainbowYOUTH, formerly Auckland Lesbian and Gay Youth) is a registered charitable organisation that provides education, information, support and advocacy for LGBTIQ youth in New Zealand. It was formed in 1989.

== History ==
Rainbow Youth was originally formed under the name Auckland Lesbian and Gay Youth in 1989 and became an incorporated society in 1995, also being renamed Rainbow Youth at the same time. Between the late 1990s and 2005, RainbowYOUTH began their education program in Auckland high schools, as well as several of their peer support groups.

== Mission ==
Rainbow Youth's mission is “to provide unbiased information and education regarding sexuality, gender and identity to everyone in the community, in order to foster understanding and acceptance of diversity” and "to provide support, information and advocacy services to queer and questioning youth, their friends, and whānau".

== Governance ==
Rainbow Youth is run by youth and for youth, with its executive board being made up entirely of people under the age of 27.

== Services ==
Rainbow Youth runs up to seven peer-support groups in Auckland, Tauranga and Whangārei. Rainbow Youth's education programme is delivered throughout the year to participating high schools throughout the Auckland region. The workshops have been reported to be highly successful, with a study showing that between 91% and 94% of students would recommend the workshops to other young people. Rainbow Youth is also behind a rural outreach project called the I'm Local Project, which aims to provide free sexual and gender identity affirming resources and information to rural schools, medical centres and community organisations. Rainbow Youth provides in-person support peer support in Auckland, Bay of Plenty, Wellington, and Taranaki.
