= Starship Hospital =

Coordinates: 36.8596°S 174.7699°E

Starship Children's Health
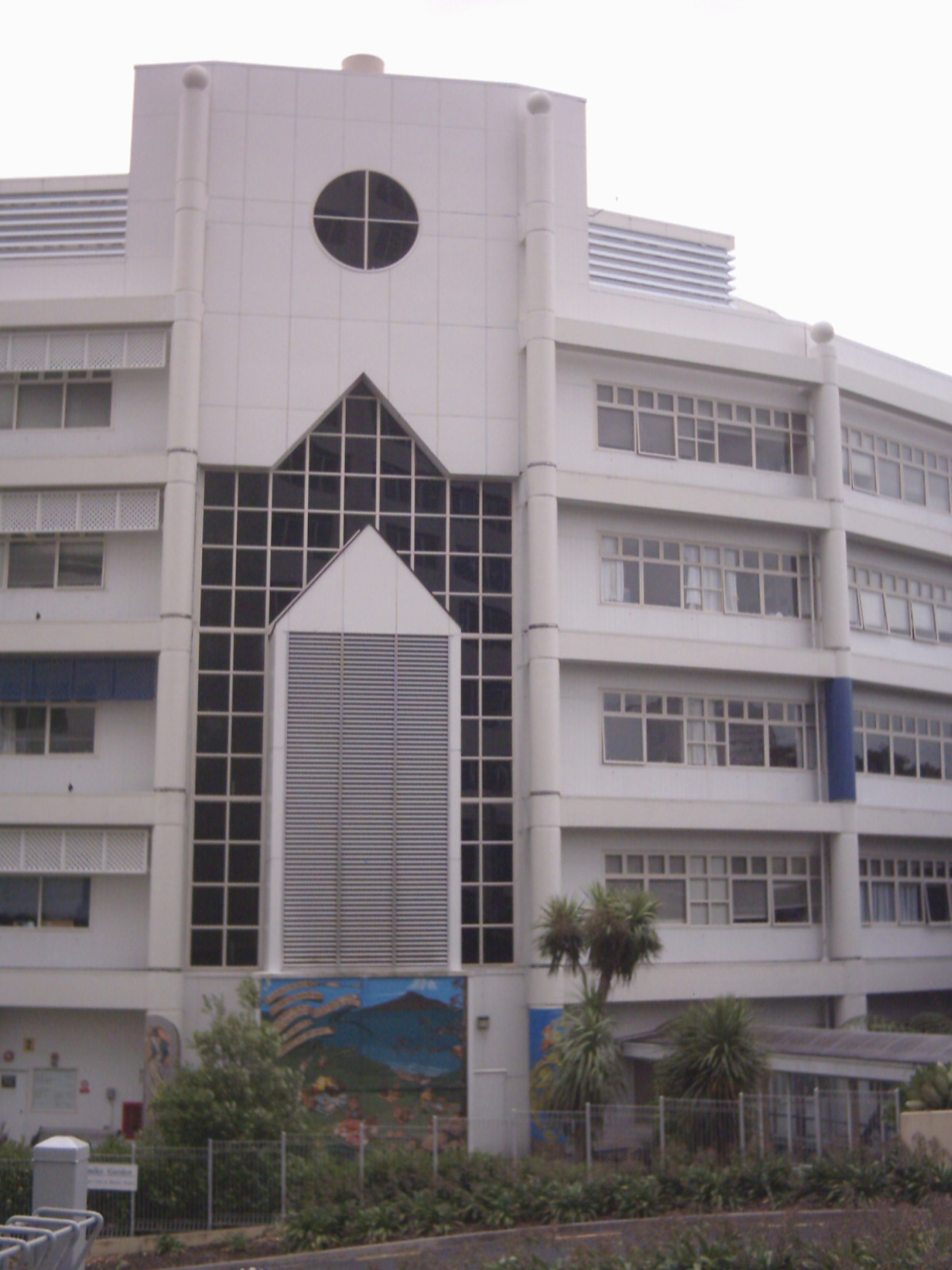
- Southern entrance of the hospital.

Geography
- Location: Auckland City, Auckland Region, New Zealand

Organisation
- Care system: Auckland District Health Board
- Type: Teaching, specialist

Services
- Emergency department: Yes
- Beds: 219

History
- Founded: 18 November 1991; 34 years ago

Links
- Website: www.starship.org.nz
- Lists: Hospitals in New Zealand

Starship Children's Hospital is a public children's hospital in Auckland, New Zealand. It was one of the first purpose-built children's hospitals in New Zealand, and is the largest such facility in the country. Although a separate facility, it is located on the same grounds as the Auckland City Hospital in Grafton, Auckland, and is adjacent to the Auckland Medical School.

On 1 July 2022 Te Whatu Ora – Health New Zealand and Te Aka Whai Ora – Māori Health Authority became New Zealand's new national health authorities and Starship became part of Health New Zealand.

== History ==
The Auckland Hospital Board agreed in principle in the 1960s that there was a need for a new children's hospital to replace the Princess Mary Children's Hospital and other paediatric wards. There was also a call for a national children's hospital offering high quality paediatric services. Approval for an 188-bed hospital was granted in 1982. The hospital opened on 18 November 1991. Its name was chosen to appeal to children and young people and while it met with some opposition it gained acceptance and was retained when Green Lane Hospital and National Women's Hospital were brought onto the Auckland Hospital site to form Auckland City Hospital.

== Building ==
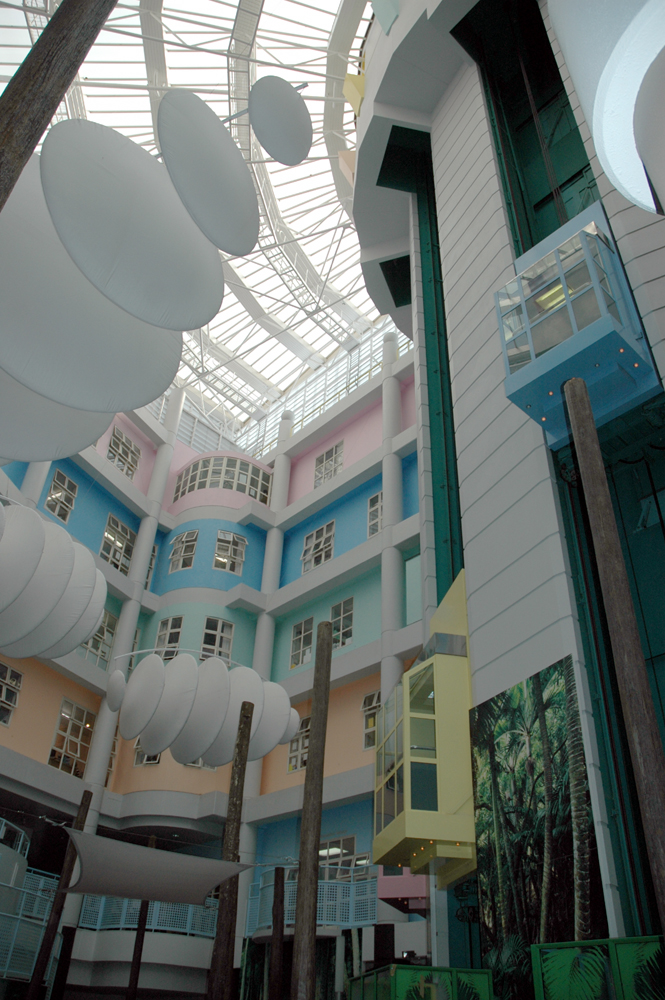
Main Starship building atrium looking up from the inner courtyard in 2006.

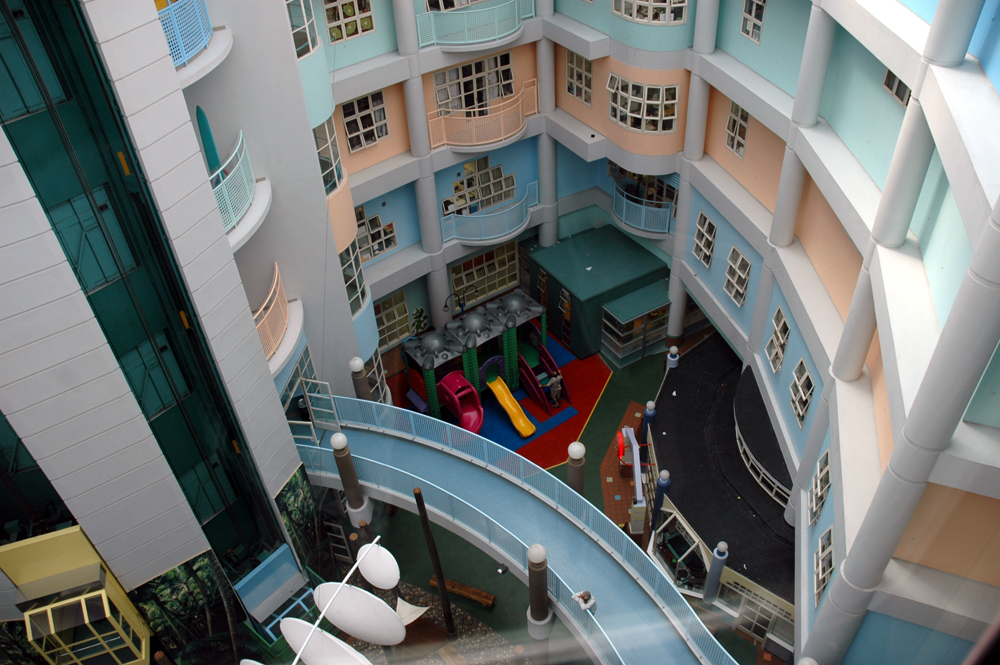
Main Starship building atrium from the top.

The building was designed by Stephenson & Turner architects to fit on a small sloping site. It has a central atrium with rooms that curve around the atrium; this allows natural light and ventilation, avoids long institutional corridors and reduces walking distance for staff and patients. The hospital was refurbished in 2003-4 with new brighter colour schemes.

== Facilities ==
Facilities include inpatient and outpatient services as well as community-based services such as Community Child Health and Disability Service, Safekids and Paediatric Home Care. The building has nine wards and a capacity of 219 beds. Besides the main building, Starship has outpatient clinics for the Auckland region in Tamaki, West Auckland and North Shore, as well as being associated with approximately 45 Outreach Clinics throughout the country.

Starship Hospital is the major trauma centre for children in the Auckland region, and the tertiary major trauma centre for children in the Northland, Auckland, and northern parts of the Waikato region. It also has its own Emergency Department separate from the main hospital.

The Green Lane Paediatric and Congenital Cardiac Service, based at Starship Hospital, provides national treatment for paediatric and adult congenital heart problems.

=== Radio Lollipop ===
The volunteer group Radio Lollipop operates a hospital radio station, as well as visiting children with games and entertainment in the evenings.
