= TVNZ+ =

New Zealand TV streaming service

TVNZ+ Te Reo Tātaki Ā-Tono
- Former name: TVNZ OnDemand (2007–2022)
- Website type: OTT platform
- Headquarters: {{{location_country}}}
- Owner: TVNZ
- Website: www.tvnz.co.nz
- Users: 2 million (As of 2022)
- Launched: 20 March 2007

TVNZ+ (Māori: Te Reo Tātaki Ā-Tono), formerly known as TVNZ OnDemand, is a New Zealand over-the-top video on demand streaming television service offered by TVNZ. It offers a variety of free content, such as news updates and programmes seen on TVNZ channels. TVNZ+ offers most of the programmes broadcast on air with licensing agreements to be shown for users in New Zealand. In addition, it offers dozens of local and international titles exclusively available on the platform.

== History ==
=== Launch ===
In January 2007, TVNZ announced the launch of a new online service called TVNZ OnDemand in March that year, which would feature a wide range of content including the drama series Shortland Street. TVNZ OnDemand was launched on 20 March 2007 with an initial selection of 300 videos from 100 television shows. Early content included the television series and programs Rude Awakenings, Karaoke High, Fair Go, Agenda, Eating Media Lunch, Praise Be, Treasure Island, and Mai Time. TVNZ OnDemand hosted shows and television clips from the TVNZ Archives. Some of the clips are free while others can be purchased using a credit purchasing system called PlayPoints. In early March, a young teenager named Kyle Wadsworth was able to access the unreleased website and start downloading shows prior to its official release.

In April 2010, TVNZ announced that TVNZ OnDemand would be available on the PlayStation 3 console, making it the first catch-up TV service to be optimised for viewing on the living room TV through PS3.

=== Watch First ===
From 2012, TVNZ OnDemand began uploading episodes of select shows prior to their airing on TVNZ channels and usually within a day of their original overseas airings (although sometimes this was weeks or months after their international airing).

In February 2014, senior telco figure Jason Foden was appointed as TVNZ OnDemand's new general manager and was tasked with leading the expansion of the streaming platform's content. TVNZ OnDemand reportedly experienced record growth over the past six months, a 90% increase on the previous year. It was also announced that TVNZ would be developing a newer and more innovative version of the streaming platform.

In September 2014, it was announced that episodes of seventeen shows would be uploaded within a day of their airings in the US, coinciding with the 2014–2015 season. One of the shows, Manhattan Love Story was cancelled by the US network ABC, but episodes continued to be uploaded to TVNZ OnDemand in line with their intended US airings, making TVNZ the de facto original broadcaster of the series.

=== Expansion ===
TVNZ On Demand logo used from 2017-2022

In April 2016, TVNZ shut down its children's programming channel TVNZ Kidzone after the satellite provider Sky TV decided not to renew their contract. TVNZ transferred Kidzone's content online to TVNZ OnDemand.

In October 2019, a Horizon Research survey of 1,000 adults estimated that 59% of adults used TVNZ OnDemand, making it the most widely used streaming service in New Zealand. Its competitors have included Netflix (56%), Sky TV (29%), MediaWorks' ThreeNow (28%), Lightbox (18%), and Neon (7%).

=== Rebranding ===
On 13 June 2022, the service rebranded from TVNZ OnDemand to TVNZ+. TVNZ confirmed that the rebrand was not being used as an opportunity to introduce a premium version that would allow viewers to skip ads.

On 7 October 2024, TVNZ proposed investing more in its TVNZ+ streaming service as part of restructuring measures to find NZ$30 million in cost savings. On 29 October, TVNZ proposed expanding the news content of TVNZ+ while abandoning plans to shut down the 1News website.

In mid-February 2026, Canstar reported that TVNZ+ comprised six percent of the viewership in New Zealand's streaming market during the fourth quarter of 2025, based on measured interest on SVOD from JustWatch. TVNZ+ came sixth place, trailing Netflix (22%), Amazon Prime Video (21%), Disney+ (17%), Neon (15%) and Apple TV+ (9%). Canstar reported that TVNZ+ and other local platforms Neon and ThreeNow had experienced a dip in viewership due to competition from international streaming platforms.

From 20 April 2026, TVNZ+ began launching sports subscription and greater personalisation functions on its apps. This digital upgrade's launched was plagued by various bug and error issues. The new upgraded app was also incompatible with 2015 and 2016 Samsung television models, affecting thousands of users.

== Services and pricing ==
TVNZ+ is available via its website, Apple iPhones and iPads, Android mobile devices and tablets; several Smart TVs including Apple TV, Samsung TV, Panasonic TV, Android TV, Sony TV, and LG TV; desktops and laptops; PlayStation 4, PlayStation 5, Xbox One and Xbox Series X/S game consoles; Google Chromecast and Freeview devices. When first launched in March 2007, content streamed though TVNZ OnDemand was previously charged for. All content is now free, ad-supported, with advertisements being shown before, during and after videos.

== Content ==
TVNZ+ has the distribution rights for Batwoman, and the New Zealand paranormal television series Wellington Paranormal. It also distributes the joint TVNZ and AMC Networks television series The Dead Lands, an adaptation of the 2014 New Zealand film The Dead Lands. TVNZ+ also has distribution rights to multiple Paramount+ series. TVNZ+ has announced that all Warner Bros. shows including Friends are exiting the platform in early 2024.
