= Valkyrian =

Valkyrian or Valkyrians may refer to:

- SS Valkyrian, a Swedish ship
- Hollow (band), a Swedish heavy metal band originally known as Valkyrian
- The Valkyrians, a Finnish ska and rocksteady band
- Valkyrian, a Swedish-American magazine
- Valkyrian, D. H. Conley High School's yearbook
- Valkyrian, the racehorse Kindergarten's damsire
- Valkyrians, characters in the video game series Valkyria Chronicles
- Valkyrian Airways, in the book series Cairo Jim

== See also ==
- Valkyria (disambiguation)
- Valkyrien (disambiguation)
- Valkyrie (disambiguation)
