= 7 Days (New Zealand game show) =

New Zealand TV comedy series

- Logo in use until Season 14
- Genre: Comedy
- Directed by: Nigel Carpenter
- Presented by: Jeremy Corbett; Paul Ego; Dai Henwood
- Country of origin: New Zealand
- Original language: English
- No. of seasons: 18
- No. of episodes: 465

Production
- Executive producer: John McDonald
- Producers: Jon Bridges (2009–2016); Rob Brown (2017–present)
- Production locations: Parnell, Auckland
- Camera setup: Multi-camera
- Running time: 23 minutes (seasons 1–13); 45 minutes (seasons 14–18)
- Production companies: thedownlowconcept; Sky

Original release
- Network: Three
- Release: 21 August 2009 – present

7 Days is a New Zealand comedy game show focused on current events, hosted by Jeremy Corbett and created by thedownlowconcept. It has aired on Three since its premiere in 2009. Two teams, consisting of a team captain — until 2022, nearly always Paul Ego and Dai Henwood — and other comedians, answer questions about stories from the last week; since 2022, the team captains have changed each week. As of 2026, 7 Days has aired for 18 seasons.

== Show format ==
During early seasons, at the start of each show, Jeremy Corbett announced a content warning, saying "the following show is for adults only and contains bad language that may offend some people". This was often followed by an opening joke based on an event in the past seven days. On some occasions, the content warning became the joke – including being said in a parody of Downfall (following several Auckland schoolboys saluting the Nazi flag), being missed out completely (while the Prime Minister was out of the country), and being texted while driving (two days before the ban on use of mobile phones while driving came into force). While the show is normally screened at 9:30pm and originally 10pm, the episode on 21 October 2011 was screened at the earlier time of 7:30pm and as a result was a PGR rated show. The opening segment mentioned the show was PGR and then replaced a few swear words with cleaner equivalents such as fudge. The show was moved to the earlier time to coincide with the screening of the 2011 Rugby World Cup Bronze Final.

After the title card, Corbett introduces the leaders of each team, normally Paul Ego for Team 1 and Dai Henwood for Team 2, although one episode featured an all-Australian team replacing Dai Henwood's team. After the leader of each team is introduced, the leader introduces the rest of their team. Regular team members include Ben Hurley, Josh Thomson, Steve Wrigley, Jeremy Elwood, Urzila Carlson, Jesse Griffin, Madeleine Sami, Michèle A'Court and Justine Smith. Special guest comedians appear on some episodes.

There are usually 5–7 games in each show, with "What's the Story" always being the first, and "Caption That" usually being last. After the teams guess the story, Corbett confirms the actual story before adding a joke of his own. In early episodes, Corbett also intervened if the joke made was in bad taste, or he became the butt of the joke, yelling "get out" and making the contestant pretend to leave.

Teams are allocated "points" at the end of the round based on numbers in the news. In earlier episodes, Corbett randomly allocated point to the teams based on their performance. The team winning the most rounds wins the episode, but this is not always the case.

An MVP was awarded in earlier episodes which was later removed. One of the panellists thanks NZ On Air to close the show.

=== Games ===
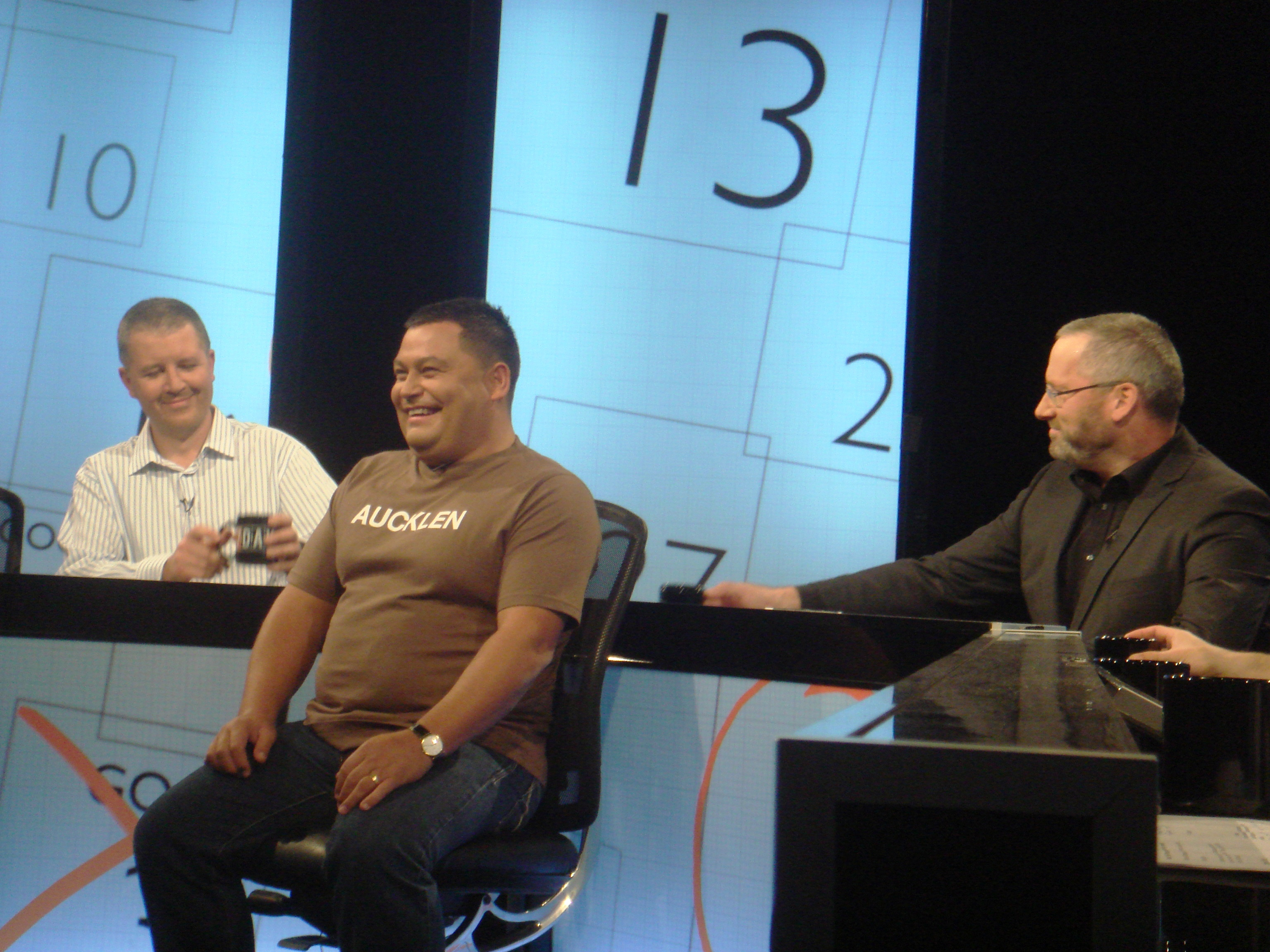
Charles Chauvel on 7 Days filming "Yes Minister" in July 2010.

Games played include:

What's the Story?
News footage with the sound removed or a photo, usually from 3 News but occasionally from ONE News, is shown while team members make humorous comments and then try and work out what the story is about.

Caption That
A caption contest: a news photograph is shown and the teams are required to invent their own (usually humorous) captions for it.

My Kid Could Draw That
A primary school child explains a picture they drew about a recent news story, and the teams must work out what it is before the kid tells them what it is.

Answers
Teams are given an answer related to a news event in the last 7 days and are required to work out what the question is, in the style of the American quiz Jeopardy!.

History
A video clip of a New Zealand historical event is played, and a person shown in the clip is then brought into the studio together with three look-alikes. The teams are required to guess which one is the person in the video. This is based on a segment in the British pop music quiz Never Mind the Buzzcocks. The segment was once played with when teams had to guess which one of the group of four was a Lawson quintuplet (New Zealand's only living set of quintuplets), not realising that the four people were four of the five quintuplets.

Community News
A newspaper headline is given, but with missing words, and the teams are required to work out the missing words. This is based on a round from the UK news quiz Have I Got News for You.

Slice of Seven
A musician comes on to the show and sings a song about a news story and the teams have to try guess the story. The name of the segment references the 1986 Dave Dobbyn single "Slice of Heaven".

Yes Minister
A political figure (usually an MP, but mayors are also common) makes an appearance, and the teams ask them closed-ended questions which the guest must answer without saying "yes" or "no" (or saying or gesturing similar). The team who makes the "minister" say 'yes' or 'no' wins. The segment's concept originated in the "Yes-No Interlude" in the game show Take Your Pick, and its name is a reference to the 1980s British sitcom Yes Minister.

Quote Me
A photo of a person and an acronym of a quote that person said during the last 7 days are given to each team, and they must come up with the correct full quote. This is based on a round from Mock the Week.

My Professional Opinion
A video clip is played with people with the same occupation (e.g. butchers, lifeguards etc.), sharing their opinion to a news story from the last 7 days but don't say what the story actually is. The teams must guess what they are talking about. After both teams have guessed another video clip is played with the people telling them "that was my professional opinion, on the (news story)". This game replaced a similar earlier game called Taxi Driver, in which a taxi driver talks about a story from the last seven days.

That's The Spirit
Used on the live show held at the SkyCity Casino in Auckland on 6 April 2011. Each team has to tell the audience about an interesting news story they have noticed in the last 7 days, an image of the article in a newspaper or webpage is shown to the audience. Formerly named Show and Tell.

In my opinion/To be honest/On the bright side/All I want for Christmas (used for the 2010 series finale)
A filler at the end of the show if running early, after the final scores have been added and the winner awarded. Team members form a humorous opinion on news stories of the week.

Guest who?
Introduced in season five, a person involved with a news story from the past week has their head covered with a black cloth, and the teams must ask closed-ended questions and the mystery guest will answer "yes" or "no". The teams will continue to ask yes-or-no questions until one team is able to work out who the guest is.

Yeah Nah
Introduced in season five, this game works very similar to a debate, where the host presents a statement and one team will be the agreeing team and one will be the disagreeing team. The teams will then give reasons as to why they agree or disagree. A winner is picked by the host at the end of the round.

AV Department
Introduced in season five, as a secondary school equivalent of 'My Kid Could Draw That'. A group of secondary school students must produce a short film based on a news story from the past 7 days, and the panellists are required to work out the story from the clip produced.

Like Sex
Introduced in season nine, each team has to describe how a thing is like sex.

Club Topicana
Introduced in season 14 - and similar to Mock the Week's "Scenes We'd Like to See" segment - it invites the panellists to tell a series of jokes by inhabiting a character in a certain situation dictated by Corbett based on a news story from the week.

== Recurring panellists ==
Dai Henwood and Paul Ego were permanent members of each team through season 14; a number of recurring comedians made up the remaining positions on the panels each night. This group have all been in more than two episodes and includes Ben Hurley, Josh Thomson, Steve Wrigley, Jeremy Elwood, Urzila Carlson, Jesse Grffin, Madeleine Sami, Michele A'Court, Cal Wilson, Claire Hooper, Heath Franklin (as Chopper), James Acaster, Joseph Moore, Jesse Mulligan, Peter Helliar and Jay-Jay Feeney.

== Episodes ==
Series	Episodes	Originally released	
Series	Episodes	First released	Last released
1	17	21 August 2009	11 December 2009
2	28	7 May 2010	24 December 2010
3	31	11 February 2011	25 November 2011
4	30	17 February 2012	23 November 2012
5	33	8 February 2013	13 December 2013
6	30	21 February 2014	21 November 2014
7	30	20 February 2015	4 December 2015
8	31	12 February 2016	4 November 2016
9	37	24 February 2017	15 December 2017
10	40	2 February 2018	14 December 2018
11	31	1 February 2019	4 October 2019
12	12	20 August 2020	5 November 2020
13	20	8 April 2021	25 November 2021
14	20	17 February 2022	30 June 2022
15	20	13 April 2023	24 August 2023
16	20	4 April 2024	15 August 2024
17	15	3 April 2025	10 July 2025
18	20	19 February 2026	2 July 2026

=== Season 1 (2009) ===
No. overall	No. in season	Title	Original release date
1	1	"21 August"	21 August 2009
2	2	"28 August"	28 August 2009
3	3	"4 September"	4 September 2009
4	4	"11 September"	11 September 2009
5	5	"18 September"	18 September 2009
6	6	"25 September"	25 September 2009
7	7	"2 October"	2 October 2009
8	8	"9 October"	9 October 2009
9	9	"16 October"	16 October 2009
10	10	"23 October"	23 October 2009
11	11	"30 October"	30 October 2009
12	12	"6 November"	6 November 2009
13	13	"13 November"	13 November 2009
14	14	"20 November"	20 November 2009
15	15	"27 November"	27 November 2009
16	16	"4 December"	4 December 2009
17	17	"11 December"	11 December 2009

=== Season 2 (2010) ===
No. overall	No. in season	Title	Original release date
19	1	"New Zealand vs. The World Special"	7 May 2010
20	2	"The Year So Far"	14 May 2010
21	3	"Season 2, Ep 3"	21 May 2010
22	4	"Season 2, Ep 4"	28 May 2010
23	5	"Season 2, Ep 5"	4 June 2010
24	6	"Season 2, Ep 6"	11 June 2010
25	7	"Season 2, Ep 7"	18 June 2010
26	8	"Season 2, Ep 8"	25 June 2010
27	9	"Season 2, Ep 9"	2 July 2010
28	10	"Season 2, Ep 10"	9 July 2010
29	11	"Season 2, Ep 11"	16 July 2010
30	12	"Season 2, Ep 12"	23 July 2010
31	13	"Season 2, Ep 13"	30 July 2010
32	14	"Season 2, Ep 14"	10 September 2010
33	15	"Season 2, Ep 15"	17 September 2010
34	16	"Season 2, Ep 16"	24 September 2010
35	17	"Season 2, Ep 17"	1 October 2010
36	18	"Season 2, Ep 18"	8 October 2010
37	19	"Season 2, Ep 19"	15 October 2010
38	20	"Season 2, Ep 20"	22 October 2010
39	21	"Season 2, Ep 21"	29 October 2010
40	22	"Season 2, Ep 22"	5 November 2010
41	23	"Season 2, Ep 23"	12 November 2010
42	24	"Season 2, Ep 24"	19 November 2010
43	25	"Season 2, Ep 25"	3 December 2010
44	26	"Season 2, Ep 26"	10 December 2010
45	27	"Season 2, Ep 27"	17 December 2010
46	28	"7 Days of Christmas"	24 December 2010
Featured news stories from the whole of 2010. A slight variation was team leaders chose their team members for each game played.

=== Season 3 (2011) ===
No. overall	No. in season	Title	Original release date
47	1	"Season 3, Ep 1"	11 February 2011
48	2	"Season 3, Ep 2"	18 February 2011
49	3	"Season 3, Ep 3"	25 February 2011
50	4	"Season 3, Ep 4"	4 March 2011
51	5	"Season 3, Ep 5"	11 March 2011
52	6	"Season 3, Ep 6"	18 March 2011
53	7	"Season 3, Ep 7"	25 March 2011
54	8	"Season 3, Ep 8"	1 April 2011
55	9	"Season 3, Ep 9"	8 April 2011
56	10	"Season 3, Ep 10"	15 April 2011
57	12	"Season 3, Ep 12"	22 April 2011
58	12	"Season 3, Ep 12"	6 May 2011
59	13	"Season 3, Ep 13"	13 May 2011
60	14	"Season 3, Ep 14"	17 June 2011
61	15	"Season 3, Ep 15"	24 June 2011
62	16	"Season 3, Ep 16"	1 July 2011
63	17	"Season 3, Ep 17"	8 July 2011
64	18	"Season 3, Ep 18"	15 July 2011
65	19	"Season 3, Ep 19"	22 July 2011
66	20	"Season 3, Ep 20"	29 July 2011
67	21	"Season 3, Ep 21"	5 August 2011
68	22	"Season 3, Ep 22"	23 September 2011
69	23	"Season 3, Ep 23"	30 September 2011
70	24	"Season 3, Ep 24"	7 October 2011
71	25	"Season 3, Ep 25"	14 October 2011
72	26	"Season 3, Ep 26"	21 October 2011
73	27	"Season 3, Ep 27"	28 October 2011
74	28	"Season 3, Ep 28"	4 November 2011
75	29	"Season 3, Ep 29"	11 November 2011
76	30	"Season 3, Ep 30"	18 November 2011
77	31	"Season 3, Ep 31"	25 November 2011

=== Season 4 (2012) ===
No. overall	No. in season	Title	Original release date
78	1	"Season 4 Ep 1"	17 February 2012
79	2	"Season 4 Ep 2"	24 February 2012
80	3	"Season 4 Ep 3"	2 March 2012
81	4	"Season 4 Ep 4"	9 March 2012
82	5	"Season 4 Ep 5"	16 March 2012
83	6	"Season 4 Ep 6"	23 March 2012
84	7	"Season 4 Ep 7"	30 March 2012
85	8	"Season 4 Ep 8"	6 April 2012
86	9	"Season 4 Ep 9"	13 April 2012
87	10	"Season 4 Ep 10"	20 April 2012
88	11	"Season 4 Ep 11"	27 April 2012
89	12	"Season 4 Ep 12"	1 June 2012
90	13	"Season 4 Ep 13"	8 June 2012
91	14	"Season 4 Ep 14"	15 June 2012
92	15	"Season 4 Ep 15"	22 June 2012
93	16	"Season 4 Ep 16"	29 June 2012
94	17	"Season 4 Ep 17"	6 July 2012
95	18	"Season 4 Ep 18"	13 July 2012
96	19	"Season 4 Ep 19"	20 July 2012
97	20	"Season 4 Ep 20"	27 July 2012
98	21	"Season 4 Ep 21"	3 August 2012
99	22	"Season 4 Ep 22"	24 August 2012
100	23	"Season 4 Ep 23"	5 October 2012
101	24	"Season 4 Ep 24"	12 October 2012
102	25	"Season 4 Ep 25"	19 October 2012
103	26	"Season 4 Ep 26"	26 October 2012
104	27	"Season 4 Ep 27"	2 November 2012
105	28	"Season 4 Ep 28"	9 November 2012
106	29	"Season 4 Ep 28"	16 November 2012
107	30	"Season 4 Ep 30"	23 November 2012

=== Season 5 (2013) ===
No. overall	No. in season	Title	Original release date
108	1	"Season 5 Ep 1"	8 February 2013
109	2	"Season 5 Ep 2"	15 February 2013
110	3	"Season 5 Ep 3"	22 February 2013
111	4	"Season 5 Ep 4"	1 March 2013
112	5	"Season 5 Ep 5"	8 March 2013
113	6	"Season 5 Ep 6"	15 March 2013
114	7	"Season 5 Ep 7"	22 March 2013
115	8	"Season 5 Ep 8"	29 March 2013
116	9	"Season 5 Ep 9"	5 April 2013
117	10	"Season 5 Ep 10"	12 April 2013
118	11	"Season 5 Ep 11"	19 April 2013
119	12	"Season 5 Ep 12"	26 April 2013
120	13	"Season 5 Ep 13"	31 May 2013
121	14	"Season 5 Ep 14"	7 June 2013
122	15	"Season 5 Ep 15"	14 June 2013
123	16	"Season 5 Ep 16"	21 June 2013
124	17	"Season 5 Ep 17"	28 June 2013
125	18	"Season 5 Ep 18"	5 July 2013
126	19	"Season 5 Ep 19"	12 July 2013
127	20	"Season 5 Ep 20"	19 July 2013
128	21	"Comedy for Cure Kids: Good Sports"	23 August 2013
129	22	"Season 5 Ep 22"	27 September 2013
130	23	"Season 5 Ep 23"	4 October 2013
131	24	"Season 5 Ep 24"	11 October 2013
132	25	"Season 5 Ep 25"	18 October 2013
133	26	"Season 5 Ep 26"	25 October 2013
134	27	"Season 5 Ep 27"	1 November 2013
135	28	"Season 5 Ep 28"	8 November 2013
136	29	"Season 5 Ep 29"	15 November 2013
137	30	"Season 5 Ep 30"	22 November 2013
138	31	"Season 5 Ep 31"	29 November 2013
139	32	"Season 5 Ep 32"	6 December 2013
140	33	"Season 5 Ep 33"	13 December 2013

=== Season 6 (2014) ===
No. overall	No. in season	Title	Original release date
141	1	"Season 6 Ep 1"	21 February 2014
142	2	"Season 6 Ep 2"	28 February 2014
143	3	"Season 6 Ep 3"	7 March 2014
144	4	"Season 6 Ep 4"	14 March 2014
145	5	"Season 6 Ep 5"	21 March 2014
146	6	"Season 6 Ep 6"	28 March 2014
147	7	"Season 6 Ep 7"	4 April 2014
148	8	"Season 6 Ep 8"	11 April 2014
149	9	"Season 6 Ep 9"	18 April 2014
150	10	"The Comedy Festival Live Special"	25 April 2014
151	11	"Season 6 Ep 11"	13 June 2014
152	12	"Season 6 Ep 12"	20 June 2014
153	13	"Season 6 Ep 13"	27 June 2014
154	14	"Season 6 Ep 14"	4 July 2014
155	15	"Season 6 Ep 15"	11 July 2014
156	16	"Season 6 Ep 16"	18 July 2014
157	17	"Season 6 Ep 17"	25 July 2014
158	18	"Season 6 Ep 18"	1 August 2014
159	19	"Season 6 Ep 19"	8 August 2014
160	20	"Season 6 Ep 20"	15 August 2014
161	21	"Red Nose Day 2014 Special"	22 August 2014
162	22	"Derision '14"	19 September 2014
163	23	"Season 6 Ep 23"	3 October 2014
164	24	"Season 6 Ep 24"	10 October 2014
165	25	"Season 6 Ep 25"	17 October 2014
166	26	"Season 6 Ep 26"	24 October 2014
167	27	"Season 6 Ep 27"	31 October 2014
168	28	"Season 7 Ep 1"	7 November 2014
169	29	"Season 7 Ep 2"	14 November 2014
170	30	"Season 7 Ep 3"	21 November 2014

=== Season 7 (2015) ===
No. overall	No. in season	Title	Original release date
171	1	"Season 7 Ep 4"	20 February 2015
172	2	"Season 7 Ep 5"	27 February 2015
173	3	"Season 7 Ep 6"	6 March 2015
174	4	"Season 7 Ep 7"	13 March 2015
157	5	"Season 7 Ep 8"	20 March 2015
176	6	"Season 7 Ep 9"	27 March 2015
177	7	"Season 7 Ep 10"	3 April 2015
178	8	"Season 7 Ep 11"	10 April 2015
179	9	"Season 7 Ep 12"	17 April 2015
180	10	"Comedy Fest Special"	24 April 2015
181	11	"Season 7 Ep 14"	12 June 2015
182	12	"Season 7 Ep 15"	19 June 2015
183	13	"Season 7 Ep 16"	26 June 2015
184	14	"Season 7 Ep 17"	3 July 2015
185	15	"Season 7 Ep 18"	10 July 2015
186	16	"Season 7 Ep 19"	17 July 2015
187	17	"Season 7 Ep 20"	24 July 2015
188	18	"Season 7 Ep 21"	31 July 2015
189	19	"Season 7 Ep 22"	7 August 2015
190	20	"Season 7 Ep 23"	14 August 2015
191	21	"Season 7 Ep 24"	21 August 2015
192	22	"Season 7 Ep 25"	9 October 2015
193	23	"Season 7 Ep 26"	16 October 2015
194	24	"Season 7 Ep 27"	23 October 2015
195	25	"Season 7 Ep 28"	30 October 2015
196	26	"Season 7 Ep 29"	6 November 2015
197	27	"Season 7 Ep 30"	13 November 2015
198	28	"Season 8 Ep 1"	20 November 2015
199	29	"Season 8 Ep 2"	27 November 2015
200	30	"200th Episode"	4 December 2015

=== Season 8 (2016) ===
No. overall	No. in season	Title	Original release date
201	1	"Season 8 Ep 4"	12 February 2016
202	2	"Season 8 Ep 5"	19 February 2016
203	3	"Season 8 Ep 6"	26 February 2016
204	4	"Season 8 Ep 7"	4 March 2016
205	5	"Season 8 Ep 8"	11 March 2016
206	6	"Season 8 Ep 9"	18 March 2016
207	7	"Season 8 Ep 10"	1 April 2016
208	8	"Season 8 Ep 11"	8 April 2016
209	9	"Season 8 Ep 12"	15 April 2016
210	10	"Season 8 Ep 13"	22 April 2016
211	11	"29 April 2016"	29 April 2016
212	12	"6 May 2016"	6 May 2016
213	13	"13 May 2016"	13 May 2016
214	14	"20 May 2016"	20 May 2016
215	15	"27 May 2016"	27 May 2016
216	16	"3 June 2016"	3 June 2016
217	17	"29 July 2016"	29 July 2016
218	18	"5 August 2016"	5 August 2016
219	19	"12 August 2016"	12 August 2016
220	20	"19 August 2016"	19 August 2016
221	21	"Rove Takes Over"	26 August 2016
222	22	"2 September 2016"	2 September 2016
223	23	"9 September 2016"	9 September 2016
224	24	"16 September 2016"	16 September 2016
225	25	"23 September 2016"	23 September 2016
226	26	"30 September 2016"	30 September 2016
227	27	"7 October 2016"	7 October 2016
228	28	"14 October 2016"	14 October 2016
229	29	"21 October 2016"	21 October 2016
230	30	"28 October 2016"	28 October 2016
231	31	"4 November 2016"	4 November 2016

=== Season 9 (2017) ===
No. overall	No. in season	Title	Original release date
232	1	"24 February 2017"	24 February 2017
233	2	"3 March 2017"	3 March 2017
234	3	"10 March 2017"	10 March 2017
235	4	"17 March 2017"	17 March 2017
236	5	"24 March 2017"	24 March 2017
237	6	"31 March 2017"	31 March 2017
238	7	"7 April 2017"	7 April 2017
239	8	"21 April 2017"	21 April 2017
240	9	"28 April 2017"	28 April 2017
241	10	"5 May 2017"	5 May 2017
242	11	"12 May 2017"	12 May 2017
243	12	"19 May 2017"	19 May 2017
244	13	"26 May 2017"	26 May 2017
245	14	"2 June 2017"	2 June 2017
246	15	"9 June 2017"	9 June 2017
247	16	"16 June 2017"	16 June 2017
248	17	"28 July 2017"	28 July 2017
249	18	"4 August 2017"	4 August 2017
250	19	"7 Days Says Sorry to Hamilton"	11 August 2017
251	20	"18 August 2017"	18 August 2017
252	21	"25 August 2017"	25 August 2017
253	22	"1 September 2017"	1 September 2017
254	23	"8 September 2017"	8 September 2017
255	24	"15 September 2017"	15 September 2017
256	25	"22 September 2017"	22 September 2017
257	26	"29 September 2017"	29 September 2017
258	27	"6 October 2017"	6 October 2017
259	28	"13 October 2017"	13 October 2017
260	29	"20 October 2017"	20 October 2017
261	30	"27 October 2017"	27 October 2017
262	31	"3 November 2017"	3 November 2017
263	32	"10 November 2017"	10 November 2017
264	33	"17 November 2017"	17 November 2017
265	34	"24 November 2017"	24 November 2017
266	35	"1 December 2017"	1 December 2017
267	36	"8 December 2017"	8 December 2017
268	37	"Best of 2017"	15 December 2017

=== Season 10 (2018) ===
No. overall	No. in season	Title	Original release date
269	1	"Friday 2 February 2018"	2 February 2018
270	2	"Friday 9 February 2018"	9 February 2018
271	3	"Friday 16 February 2018"	16 February 2018
272	4	"Friday 23 February 2018"	23 February 2018
273	5	"Friday 2 March 2018"	2 March 2018
274	6	"Friday 9 March 2018"	9 March 2018
275	7	"Friday 16 March 2018"	16 March 2018
276	8	"Friday 23 March 2018"	23 March 2018
277	9	"Friday 20 April 2018"	20 April 2018
278	10	"Friday 27 April 2018"	27 April 2018
279	11	"Friday 4 May 2018"	4 May 2018
280	12	"Friday 11 May 2018"	11 May 2018
281	13	"Friday 18 May 2018"	18 May 2018
282	14	"Friday 25 May 2018"	25 May 2018
283	15	"Friday 1 June 2018"	1 June 2018
284	16	"Friday 8 June 2018"	8 June 2018
285	17	"Friday 15 June 2018"	15 June 2018
286	18	"Friday 22 June 2018"	22 June 2018
287	19	"Friday 29 June 2018"	29 June 2018
288	20	"Friday 6 July 2018"	6 July 2018
289	21	"Friday 13 July 2018"	13 July 2018
290	22	"Friday 20 July 2018"	20 July 2018
291	23	"Friday 27 July 2018"	27 July 2018
292	24	"Friday 3 August 2018"	3 August 2018
293	25	"Friday 31 August 2018"	31 August 2018
294	26	"Friday 7 September 2018"	7 September 2018
295	27	"Friday 14 September 2018"	14 September 2018
296	28	"Friday 21 September 2018"	21 September 2018
297	29	"Friday 28 September 2018"	28 September 2018
298	30	"Friday 5 October 2018"	5 October 2018
299	31	"Friday 12 October 2018"	12 October 2018
300	32	"Spring Break"	19 October 2018
301	33	"Friday 26 October 2018"	26 October 2018
302	34	"Friday 2 November 2018"	2 November 2018
303	35	"Friday 9 November 2018"	9 November 2018
304	36	"Friday 16 November 2018"	16 November 2018
305	37	"Friday 23 November 2018"	23 November 2018
306	38	"Friday 30 November 2018"	30 November 2018
307	39	"Friday 7 December 2018"	7 December 2018
308	40	"Best of 2018"	14 December 2018

=== Season 11 (2019) ===
No. overall	No. in season	Title	Panellists	Original release date
309	1	"Friday 1 February 2019"	Cori Gonzalez-Macuer, Ben Hurley, Justine Smith, Hayley Sproull	1 February 2019
310	2	"Friday 8 February 2019"	Urzila Carlson, Laura Daniel, Tom Furniss, Chris Parker	8 February 2019
311	3	"Friday 15 February 2019"	Becky Lucas, Ray O'Leary, Justine Smith, Josh Thomson	15 February 2019
311	4	"Friday 22 February 2019"	Melanie Bracewell, Lloyd Langford, Rhys Mathewson, Hayley Sproull	22 February 2019
312	5	"Friday 1 March 2019"	Urzila Carlson, Ben Hurley, Rhys Nicholson, Madeleine Sami	1 March 2019
313	6	"Friday 8 March 2019"	Melanie Bracewell, Jeremy Elwood, Shavaughn Ruakere, Josh Thomson	8 March 2019
314	7	"Friday 15 March 2019"	Melanie Bracewell, Harley Breen, Joseph Moore, Justine Smith	15 March 2019
315	8	"Friday 22 March 2019"	Urzila Carlson, Bryce Casey, Ben Hurley, Brynley Stent	22 March 2019
316	9	"Friday 29 March 2019"	Jeremy Elwood, Tom Furniss, Claire Hooper, Hayley Sproull	29 March 2019
317	10	"Friday 5 April 2019"	Michele A'Court, Cori Gonzalez-Macuer, Madeleine Sami, Josh Thomson	5 April 2019
318	11	"Friday 12 April 2019"	Kura Forrester, Ben Hurley, Rhys Mathewson, Justine Smith	12 April 2019
319	12	"Friday 3 May 2019"	Heath Franklin (Chopper) (Guest Team 2 Leader); Dai Henwood, Ben Hurley, Lloyd Langford, Lauren Pattison	3 May 2019
320	13	"Friday 10 May 2019"	Jimmy McGhie, Rhys Nicholson, Hayley Sproull, Josh Thomson	10 May 2019
321	14	"Friday 17 May 2019"	Melanie Bracewell, Ed Byrne, Cori Gonzalez-Macuer, Alice Snedden	17 May 2019
322	15	"Friday 24 May 2019"	Pax Assadi, Jeremy Elwood, Chris Parker, Madeleine Sami	24 May 2019
323	16	"Friday 31 May 2019"	Urzila Carlson, Lloyd Langford, Matt Okine, Brynley Stent	31 May 2019
324	17	"Friday 7 June 2019"	Bryce Casey, Heath Franklin (Chopper), Ben Hurley, Justine Smith	7 June 2019
325	18	"Friday 14 June 2019"	Melanie Bracewell, Urzila Carlson, Heath Franklin (Chopper), Tom Furniss	14 June 2019
326	19	"Friday 21 June 2019"	Ben Hurley (Guest Team 2 Leader); Melanie Bracewell, Cori Gonzalez-Macuer, Chris Parker, Hayley Sproull	21 June 2019
327	20	"Friday 19 July 2019"	Pax Assadi, Kura Forrester, Heath Franklin (Chopper), Justine Smith	19 July 2019
328	21	"Friday 26 July 2019"	Cori Gonzalez-Macuer, Ben Hurley, Ray O'Leary, Livi Reihana	26 July 2019
329	22	"Friday 2 August 2019"	Harley Breen, Tom Furniss, Rhys Mathewson, Brynley Stent	2 August 2019
330	23	"Friday 9 August 2019"	Jeremy Elwood, Cori Gonzalez-Macuer, Livi Reihana, Justine Smith	9 August 2019
331	24	"Friday 16 August 2019"	Melanie Bracewell, Rhys Darby, Ben Hurley, Lana Walters	16 August 2019
332	25	"Friday 23 August 2019"	Michele A'Court, Rhys Mathewson, Sam Simmons, Justine Smith	23 August 2019
333	26	"10th Birthday Special"	Melanie Bracewell, Heath Franklin (Chopper), Madeleine Sami, Justine Smith, Josh Thomson	30 August 2019
334	27	"Friday 6 September 2019"	Kura Forrester, Tom Furniss, Ben Hurley, Ray O'Leary	6 September 2019
335	28	"Friday 13 September 2019"	Melanie Bracewell, Mel Buttle, Joseph Moore, Josh Thomson, Lana Walters	13 September 2019
336	29	"Friday 20 September 2019"	Bryce Casey (Guest Team 1 Leader); Laura Daniel, Claire Hooper, Ben Hurley, Chris Parker	20 September 2019
337	30	"Friday 27 September 2019"	Justine Smith (Guest Team 1 Leader); Heath Franklin (Chopper), Guy Montgomery, Josh Thomson, Lana Walters	27 September 2019
338	31	"Friday 4 October 2019"	Ben Hurley (Guest Team 1 Leader); Melanie Bracewell, Jeremy Elwood, Cori Gonzalez-Macuer, Joseph Moore	4 October 2019

=== Season 12 (2020) ===
No. overall	No. in season	Title	Panellists	Original release date
339	1	"Thursday 20 August 2020"	Melanie Bracewell, Laura Daniel, Rhys Mathewson, Josh Thomson	20 August 2020
340	2	"Thursday 27 August 2020"	Ben Hurley (Guest Team 2 Leader); Pax Assadi, Cori Gonzalez-Macuer, Alice Snedden, Hayley Sproull	27 August 2020
341	3	"Thursday 3 September 2020"	Melanie Bracewell (Guest Team 2 Leader); Ben Hurley, Ray O'Leary, Chris Parker, Justine Smith	3 September 2020
342	4	"Thursday 10 September 2020"	Leigh Hart, Hayley Sproull, Brynley Stent, Josh Thomson	10 September 2020
343	5	"Thursday 17 September 2020"	Melanie Bracewell, Ben Hurley, Lana Walters, Guy Williams	17 September 2020
344	6	"Thursday 24 September 2020"	Laura Daniel, Guy Montgomery, Justine Smith, Josh Thomson	25 September 2020
345	7	"Thursday 1 October 2020"	Cori Gonzalez-Macuer, Ben Hurley, Madeleine Sami, Lana Walters	1 October 2020
346	8	"Thursday 8 October 2020"	Melanie Bracewell, Urzila Carlson, Bryce Casey, Rhys Mathewson	8 October 2020
347	9	"Election Special"	Urzila Carlson, Jeremy Elwood, Ben Hurley, Hayley Sproull	15 October 2020
348	10	"Thursday 22 October 2020"	Urzila Carlson, Rhys Darby, Joseph Moore, Justine Smith	22 October 2020
349	11	"Thursday 29 October 2020"	Melanie Bracewell (Guest Team 2 Leader); Jeremy Elwood, Ben Hurley, Chris Parker, Hayley Sproull	29 October 2020
350	12	"Thursday 5 November 2020"	Michele A'Court, Urzila Carlson, Guy Montgomery, Nick Rado	5 November 2020

=== Season 13 (2021) ===
Following the lockdown in Auckland, from episode 12 onwards there was Perspex sheeting between the team leader and the guests, and the studio audience was replaced with a virtual one. The segment "That's the Spirit" was sponsored by Woodstock Bourbon.

No. overall	No. in season	Title	Team 1 (Paul Ego)	Team 2 (Dai Henwood)	Original release date
351	1	"Thursday 8 April 2021"	**Lana Walters, Josh Thomson**	Joe Daymond, Michele A'Court	8 April 2021
What's the Story; Guest Who? (with Robert Rakete); Slice of Seven (with Cassie Henderson); Answers; Caption That
352	2	"Thursday 15 April 2021"	Liv McKenzie, Rhys Mathewson	**Madeleine Sami**; **Laura Daniel, Ben Hurley**	15 April 2021
What's the Story; History; My Kid Could Draw That; That's the Spirit; Answers
353	3	"Thursday 22 April 2021"	Chris Parker, Urzila Carlson	**Rhiannon McCall, Guy Montgomery**	22 April 2021
What's the Story; Answers; Slice of Seven (with Harper Finn); Yes Minister (with Nicola Willis)
354	4	"Thursday 29 April 2021"	**Rhys Darby, Justine Smith**	Lana Walters, Guy Williams	29 April 2021
What's the Story; Guest Who? (with Eden Park CEO Nick Sautner); Answers; That's the Spirit; Caption This
355	5	"Thursday 6 May 2021"	Michele A'Court, Ben Hurley	**Paul Douglas, Melanie Bracewell**	6 May 2021
What's the Story; Answers; Slice of Seven (with Written By Wolves); A Thing is Like Sex
356	6	"Thursday 13 May 2021"	**Donna Brookbanks, Pax Assadi**	Heath Franklin (as Chopper); Liv McKenzie, Jeremy Elwood	13 May 2021
What's the Story; Answers; My Kid Could Draw That; That's the Spirit; Caption That
357	7	"Thursday 20 May 2021"	Justine Smith, Leigh Hart	**Madeleine Sami**; **Guy Montgomery, Nick Rado**	20 May 2021
What's the Story; Yes Minister (with Brooke van Velden); Answers; Caption That
358	8	"Thursday 27 May 2021"	Laura Daniel, Urzila Carlson	**Melanie Bracewell, Rhys Mathewson**	27 May 2021
What's the Story; Yes Minister (with Ricardo Menéndez March); My Kid Could Draw That; That's the Spirit; Caption That
359	9	"Thursday 3 June 2021"	**Melanie Bracewell, Ray O'Leary**	Rhiannon McCall, Heath Franklin (as Chopper)	3 June 2021
Guest Who? (with Kiran Parbhu); What's the Story; Answers; A Thing is Like Sex
360	10	"Thursday 10 June 2021"	Guy Montgomery, Laura Daniel	**Justine Smith, Ben Hurley**	10 June 2021
What's the Story; Slice of Seven (with Muroki); Answers; That's the Spirit; And This Is My Problem; Caption That
361	11	"Thursday 12 August 2021"	**Lana Walters, Rhys Mathewson**	Liv McKenzie, Josh Thomson	12 August 2021
Clues; That's the Spirit; Slice of Seven (with Jon Toogood); Answers
362	12	"Thursday 30 September 2021"	Madeleine Sami	**Laura Daniel**	30 September 2021
Clues; Answers; My Kid Could Draw That; That's the Spirit; Caption That
363	13	"Thursday 7 October 2021"	**Justine Smith, Guy Montgomery**	Brynley Stent, Leigh Hart	7 October 2021
Slice of Seven (with Jed Parsons); Answers; Clues; Caption That
364	14	"Thursday 14 October 2021"	Laura Daniel, Paul Douglas	**Floyd Alexander-Hunt, Jeremy Elwood**	14 October 2021
Clues; Answers; My Kid Could Draw That; That's the Spirit — due to COVID exposure, Josh Thomson filled in for Jeremy Corbett as host
365	15	"Thursday 21 October 2021"	**Angella Dravid, Joseph Moore**	Laura Daniel, Guy Montgomery	21 October 2021
Answers; That's the Spirit; Slice of Seven (with Emma Dilemma); Caption That
366	16	"Thursday 28 October 2021"	Chris Parker, Pax Assadi	**Madeleine Sami, Urzila Carlson**	28 October 2021
Clues; Answers; My Kid Could Draw That; Caption That
367	17	"Thursday 4 November 2021"	**Laura Daniel, Guy Montgomery**	Justine Smith, Ray O'Leary	4 November 2021
Clues; Answers; Slice of Seven (with Georgia Lines); What's the Spirit; Caption That
368	18	"Thursday 11 November 2021"	Madeline Sami, Urzila Carlson	**Tom Sainsbury, Rhys Mathewson**	11 November 2021
Good News Battle; Answers; My Kid Could Draw That; Caption That
369	19	"Thursday 18 November 2021"	**Bree Tomasel, Hayley Sproull**	Joseph Moore, Guy Montgomery	18 November 2021
Good News Battle; Answers; Slice of Seven (with Barnaby Weir); That's the Spirit; Caption This
370	20	"Thursday 25 November 2021"	David Correos, Urzila Carlson	**Justine Smith, Jeremy Elwood**	25 November 2021
Answers; Good News Battle; Slice of Seven (with Summer Thieves); Caption That

=== Season 14 (2022) ===
With this season, the show moved to an earlier 7:30 pm timeslot and a new hour-long broadcast; saw a new logo, redesigned set, and reworked theme song; and team leaders (in bold) became rotated week-to-week. Teams began receiving point totals at the end of each show. Each episode featured a caption contest sponsored by Frank Energy.

Episodes broadcast in May 2022 averaged over 180,000 viewers, an improvement from below 160,000 viewers for the series premiere in February. Ratings then declined below 170,000, before increasing steadily to over 200,000 viewers for the series finale.

No. overall	No. in season	Title	Team 1	Team 2	Original release date	Score
371	1	"Thursday 17 February 2022"	**Laura Daniel**; Melanie Bracewell, Urzila Carlson	**Guy Montgomery**; Joseph Moore, Hayley Sproull	17 February 2022	**4**–3
Newsmakers; Yes Minister (with Erica Stanford); Good News Battle; Where is the Lie; Guest Who (with Phil Goff); Home Movies; Quiztory Never Repeats; Club Topicana
372	2	"Thursday 24 February 2022"	**Melanie Bracewell**; Angella Dravid, Ben Hurley	**Rhys Mathewson**; David Correos, Urzila Carlson	24 February 2022	**5**–4
Newsmakers; Quiztory Never Repeats; Slice of Seven (with Jamie McDell); Where is the Lie; Club Topicana; Good News Battle; Beat the Ding; Yes Minister (with David Seymour)
373	3	"Thursday 3 March 2022"	**Chris Parker**; Joseph Moore, Melanie Bracewell	**Urzila Carlson**; Liv McKenzie, Ray O'Leary	3 March 2022	**5**–4
Newsmakers; Guest Who (with Efeso Collins); Home Movies; Where is the Lie; Club Topicana; Good News Battle; Quiztory Never Repeats; Beat the Ding
374	4	"Thursday 10 March 2022"	**Paul Ego**; Lana Walters, Ben Hurley	**Laura Daniel**; Brynley Stent, Ben Boyce	10 March 2022	**6**–5
Newsmakers; Yes Minister (with Simon Watts); My Audience Could Draw That; Where is the Lie; Club Topicana; Good News Battle; Beat the Ding
375	5	"Thursday 17 March 2022"	**Josh Thomson**; Livi Reihana, Pax Assadi	**Justine Smith**; Lana Walters, Ray O'Leary	17 March 2022	4–**5**
Newsmakers; Guest Who (with Susan Sherwen); History; Quiztory Never Repeats; Beat the Ding; Answers; Club Topicana
376	6	"Thursday 24 March 2022"	**Paul Ego**; Angella Dravid, Laura Daniel	**James Roque**; Guy Montgomery, Josh Thomson	24 March 2022	3–**4**
Newsmakers; Guest Who; Good News Battle; Club Topicana; Where is the Lie; Yes Minister (with Golriz Ghahraman); Quiztory Never Repeats; Beat the Ding
377	7	"Thursday 31 March 2022"	**Rhys Mathewson**; Lana Walters, Justine Smith	**Ben Hurley**; Michelle A'Court, Paul Douglas	31 March 2022	**5**–2
Newsmakers; Slice of Seven (with Valkyrie); Club Topicana; Where is the Lie; Quiztory Never Repeats; Beat the Ding
378	8	"Thursday 7 April 2022"	**Dai Henwood**; Angella Dravid, Tom Sainsbury	**Laura Daniel**; Abby Howells, Joseph Moore	7 April 2022	5–**6**
Newsmakers; Yes Minister (with Shane Reti); Club Topicana; My Kid Could Draw That; Quiztory Never Repeats; Beat the Ding
379	9	"Thursday 14 April 2022"	**Hayley Sproull**; Rhiannon McCall, Jeremy Elwood	**Paul Ego**; Ray O'Leary, Pax Assadi	14 April 2022	**6**–4
Newsmakers; Guest Who; My Audience Could Draw That; Club Topicana; Where is the Lie; Good News Battle; Beat the Ding
380	10	"Thursday 21 April 2022"	**Eli Matthewson**; Anika Moa, Laura Daniel	**James Roque**; Mel Buttle, Ben Hurley	21 April 2022	**4**–3
Newsmakers; History; Slice of Seven (with Miles Calder); Club Topicana; Guest Who; Beat the Ding
381	11	"Thursday 28 April 2022" (Anzac Day special)	Team New Zealand: **Josh Thomson**; Brynley Stent, Justine Smith	Team Australia: **Alex Ward**; Harley Breen, Heath Franklin	28 April 2022	3–**4**
Newsmakers; Yes Minister (with Carmel Sepuloni); Club Topicana; Slice of Seven (with Will Martin); Good News Battle; Beat the Ding
382	12	"Thursday 5 May 2022"	**Chris Parker**; Abby Howells, Lana Walters	**Paul Ego**; Angella Dravid, Guy Montgomery	5 May 2022	**5**–4
Newsmakers; Guest Who; Slice of Seven (with Anthonie Tonnon); Club Topicana; Where is the Lie; Beat the Ding;
383	13	"Thursday 12 May 2022"	**Dai Henwood**; Justine Smith, Ray O'Leary	**Eli Matthewson**; Angella Dravid, Rhys Mathewson	12 May 2022	4–**5**
Newsmakers; Yes Minister (with Christopher Luxon); Club Topicana; Where is the Lie; Answers; My Audience Could Draw That; Beat the Ding
384	14	"Thursday 19 May 2022"	**Hayley Sproull**; Alice Snedden, Joseph Moore	**Ben Hurley**; Donna Brookbank, Josh Thomson	19 May 2022	**6**–4
Newsmakers; Guest Who; Club Topicana; Good News Battle; Quiztory Never Repeats; Beat the Ding
385	15	"Thursday 26 May 2022"	**Laura Daniel**; Brynley Stent, Ben Boyce	**Dai Henwood**; Lana Walters, Heath Franklin	26 May 2022	2–**4**
Newsmakers; Yes Minister (with Cameron Luxton and Jan Tinetti); Slice of Seven (with Riiki Reid); Where is the Lie; Club Topicana; Quiztory Never Repeats; Beat the Ding
386	16	"Thursday 2 June 2022"	**Rhys Nicholson**; Alice Snedden, Guy Williams	**Guy Montgomery**; Becky Umbers, Chris Parker	2 June 2022	**6**–4
Newsmakers; History; My Kid Could Draw That; Where is the Lie; Club Topicana; Good News Battle; Beat the Ding
387	17	"Thursday 9 June 2022"	**Rhys Mathewson**; Angella Dravid, Joseph Moore	**Mel Buttle**; Bree Tomasel, Ben Hurley	9 June 2022	5–**6**
Newsmakers; History; Slice of Seven (with Anita Clark and Samuel Flynn Scott); Club Topicana; Quiztory Never Repeats; Beat the Ding
388	18	"Thursday 16 June 2022"	**Alex Ward**; Laura Daniel, Hayley Sproull	**Paul Ego**; Chris Parker, Josh Thomson	16 June 2022	**4**–3
Newsmakers; Guest Who; Club Topicana; My Audience Could Draw That; Good News Battle; Beat the Ding
389	19	"Thursday 23 June 2022"	**Dai Henwood**; Lana Walters, Harley Breen	**Madeleine Sami**; Angella Dravid, Ben Hurley	23 June 2022	3–**6**
Newsmakers; History; Club Topicana; My Kid Could Draw That; Quiztory Never Repeats; Beat the Ding
390	20	"Thursday 30 June 2022"	**Guy Montgomery**; Madeleine Sami, Tom Sainsbury	**Laura Daniel**; Ray O'Leary, Joseph Moore	30 June 2022	**6**–3
Newsmakers; History; Slice of Seven (with Lost Tribe); Club Topicana; Answers; Beat the Ding
391	21	"Best of 7 Days 2022"	N/A	N/A	7 July 2022	N/A

=== Season 15 (2023) ===
The series launched to 141,800 viewers. During this season, Dole sponsored the Club Topicana segment.

No. overall	No. in season	Title	Team 1	Team 2	Original release date	Score
TBA	1	"Thursday 13 April 2023"	**Hayley Sproull**; Rhys Mathewson, Josh Thomson	**Eli Matthewson**; Brynley Stent, Laura Daniel	13 April 2023	4–4
TBA	2	"Thursday 20 April 2023"	**Mel Bracewell**; Bailey Poching, Joseph Moore	**Dai Henwood**; Angella Dravid, Lana Walters	20 April 2023	**3**–2
TBA	3	"Thursday 27 April 2023"	**Paul Ego**; Becky Umbers, Guy Montgomery	**Alex Ward**; Frankie McNair, Chris Parker	27 April 2023	**6**–3
TBA	4	"Thursday 4 May 2023"	**Mel Bracewell**; Hayley Sproull, Josh Thomson	**Lloyd Langford**; Becky Lucas, Danny O'Brien	4 May 2023	**4**–3
Live special filmed at SkyCity Auckland.
395	5	"Thursday 11 May 2023"	**Urzila Carlson**; Sara Pascoe, Heath Franklin	**Ben Hurley**; Lana Walters, Ed Byrne	11 May 2023	5–**6**
396	6	"Thursday 18 May 2023"	**Hayley Sproull**; Courtney Dawson, Madeleine Sami	**Dai Henwood**; Jamaine Ross, Paul Douglas	18 May 2023	3–**6**
397	7	"Thursday 25 May 2023"	**Paul Ego**; Brett Blake, Alex Ward	**Laura Daniel**; Olga Koch, Rhys Mathewson	25 May 2023	3–**5**
398	8	"Thursday 1 June 2023"	**Josh Thomson**; Becky Umbers, Justine Smith	**Chris Parker**; Angella Dravid, Joseph Moore	1 June 2023	5–**6**
399	9	"Thursday 8 June 2023"	**Laura Daniel**; Abby Howells, Ray O'Leary	**Guy Montgomery**; Brynley Stent, Bailey Poching	8 June 2023	4–**5**
400	10	"Thursday 15 June 2023"	**Mel Bracewell**; Hayley Sproull, Harley Breen	**Dai Henwood**; Lana Walters, Ben Hurley	15 June 2023	**7**–2
401	11	"Thursday 22 June 2023"	**Paul Ego**; Courtney Dawson, Urzila Carlson	**Joseph Moore**; Eli Matthewson, Justine Smith	22 June 2023	**6**–4
402	12	"Thursday 29 June 2023"	**Laura Daniel**; Karen O'Leary, Ray O'Leary	**Madeleine Sami**; Rhys Mathewson, Jeremy Elwood	29 June 2023	**5**–4
403	13	"Thursday 6 July 2023"	**Hayley Sproull**; Frankie McNair, Joseph Moore	**Ben Hurley**; Rhiannon McCall, Tony Lyall	6 July 2023	**5**–4
Newsmakers; What's the Story; Yes Minister (with Kieran McAnulty); Club Topicana; Slice of Seven (with Hans Pucket); Answers; Beat the Ding
404	14	"Thursday 13 July 2023"	**Paul Ego**; Lana Walters, Laura Daniel	**Rhys Mathewson**; Michèle A'Court, Guy Montgomery	13 July 2023	4–**5**
Newsmakers; Guest Who (with Emma Poole, 2023 FMG Young Farmer of the Year); Club Topicana; History; My Audience Could Draw That; Beat the Ding
405	15	"Thursday 20 July 2023"	**Joseph Moore**; Emma Holland, Guy Williams	**Dai Henwood**; Abby Howells, Justine Smith	20 July 2023	3–**6**
Newsmakers; Yes Minister (with Nicola Willis); Club Topicana; History (with Alastair Riddell of Space Waltz); Answers; Beat the Ding
406	16	"Thursday 27 July 2023"	**Hayley Sproull**; Jack Ansett, Laura Daniel	**Chris Parker**; Angella Dravid, Heath Franklin	27 July 2023	**5**–4
Newsmakers; Yes Minister (with Rawiri Waititi); Club Topicana; My Kid Could Draw That; Guest Who (with Jack Popata); Beat the Ding
407	17	"Thursday 3 August 2023"	**Madeleine Sami**; Karen O'Leary, Ben Hurley	**Rhys Mathewson**; Rhys Nicholson, Alex Ward	3 August 2023	1–**5**
Newsmakers; History (with Derren Witcombe); Club Topicana; Slice of Seven (with Vikae); Guest Who (with Cherish from Spookers); Beat the Ding
408	18	"Thursday 10 August 2023"	**Hayley Sproull**; Rhiannon McCall, Bailey Poching	**Dai Henwood**; Lana Walters, Joseph Moore	10 August 2023	3–**7**
Newsmakers; Slice of Seven (with The Rubens); Club Topicana; Yes Minister (with Brooke van Velden); Answers; Beat the Ding
409	19	"Thursday 17 August 2023"	**Paul Ego**; Justine Smith, Josh Thomson	**Laura Daniel**; Liv McKenzie, Ben Boyce	17 August 2023	**5**–4
Newsmakers; Yes Minister (with Tāmati Coffey); Club Topicana; Slice of Seven (with Summer Thieves); Good News Battle; Beat the Ding
410	20	"Thursday 24 August 2023"	**Mel Bracewell**; Ray O'Leary, Hayley Sproull	**Josh Thomson**; Madeleine Sami, Chris Parker	24 August 2023	**7**–2
Newsmakers; Yes Minister (with Ben Bell); Club Topicana; History; Slice of Seven (with Balu Brigada); Beat the Ding
TBA	21	"Thursday 31 August 2023" "Best of 7 Days 2023"	N/A	N/A	31 August 2023	N/A

=== Season 16 (2024) ===
Season 16 premiered on 4 April 2024. Frank Energy sponsored this season's "Fill in the Frank" caption contest, and Dole again sponsored the Club Topicana segment.

No. overall	No. in season	Title	Team 1	Team 2	Original release date	Score
411	1	"Thursday 4 April 2024"	**Hayley Sproull**; Alice Snedden, Eli Matthewson	**Alex Ward**; Paul Douglas, Josh Thomson	4 April 2024	4–**6**
Newsmakers; Yes Minister (with Chlöe Swarbrick); Fill in the Frank; Slice of Seven (with Keith Pereira); Club Topicana; Guest Who; Beat the Ding
412	2	"Thursday 11 April 2024"	**Madeleine Sami**; Bridget Davies, Pax Assadi	**Dai Henwood**; Angella Dravid, Ben Hurley	11 April 2024	**5**–4
Newsmakers; Guest Who (with David Lomas); Fill in the Frank; Slice of Seven (with Mark Williams); My Audience Could Draw That; Club Topicana; Beat the Ding
413	3	"Thursday 18 April 2024"	**Paul Ego**; James Mustapic, Justine Smith	**Hayley Sproull**; Rhiannon McCall, Josh Thomson	18 April 2024	**4**–3
Newsmakers; Guest Who (with Katelyn Vaha'akolo); Fill in the Frank; Club Topicana; Yes Minister (with Barbara Edmonds); History; Beat the Ding
414	4	"Thursday 25 April 2024"	**Chris Parker**; Abby Howells, Cori Gonzales-Macuer	**Laura Daniel**; Becky Umbers, Rhys Mathewson	25 April 2024	5–**6**
Newsmakers; Guest Who; Fill in the Frank; Slice of Seven (with Fin Raziel); Club Topicana; History; Beat the Ding
415	5	"Thursday 2 May 2024" "New Zealand vs. The World"	**Dai Henwood**; Hayley Sproull, Melanie Bracewell	**Heath Franklin** (as Chopper); Olga Koch, Ian Smith	2 May 2024	5–**6**
Live special filmed on 1 May at SkyCity Auckland. Newsmakers, Yes Minister (with Chris Hipkins), Fill in the Frank, Club Topicana, Guest Who (with Mea Motu), Slice of Seven (with Julia Deans and Milan Borich), Beat the Ding
416	6	"Thursday 9 May 2024"	**Paul Ego**; Becky Umbers, Laura Daniel	**Josh Thomson**; Kirsty Webeck, Cori Gonzalez-Macuer	9 May 2024	**5**–3
Newsmakers; Guest Who (with Ria Hall); Fill in the Frank; Club Topicana; Slice of Seven (with Ha the Unclear); My Kid Could Draw That; Beat the Ding
417	7	"Thursday 16 May 2024"	**Guy Montgomery**; Frankie McNair, Justine Smith	**Dai Henwood**; Hannah Campbell, Joseph Moore	16 May 2024	**5**–4
Newsmakers; Yes Minister (with Tamatha Paul); Fill in the Frank; Slice of Seven (with When the Cat's Away); Club Topicana; Guest Who; Beat the Ding
418	8	"Thursday 23 May 2024"	**Madeleine Sami**; Abby Howells, Heath Franklin (as Chopper)	**Rhys Mathewson**; Ruby Esther, Eli Matthewson	23 May 2024	2–**7**
Newsmakers; Guest Who (with John Aiken); Fill in the Frank; Club Topicana; My Audience Could Draw That; Slice of Seven (with Tadpole); Beat the Ding
419	9	"Thursday 30 May 2024"	**Chris Parker**; Emma Holland, Ray O'Leary	**Ben Hurley**; Courtney Dawson, Lana Walters	30 May 2024	**4**–3
Newsmakers; Guest Who; Fill in the Frank; Slice of Seven (with Corrella); Club Topicana; My Kid Could Draw That; Beat the Ding
420	10	"Thursday 6 June 2024"	**Josh Thomson**; Brynley Stent, Madeleine Sami	**Dai Henwood**; Ben MacGougan, Urzila Carlson	6 June 2024	**6**–3
Newsmakers; Yes Minister (with Andrew Hoggard); Fill in the Frank; Club Topicana; Guest Who; Slice of Seven (with Deva Mahal); Beat the Ding
421	11	"Thursday 13 June 2024"	**Paul Ego**; Alex Ward, Lloyd Langford	**Hayley Sproull**; Rhiannon McCall, Guy Montgomery	13 June 2024	4–**5**
Newsmakers; Yes Minister (with Susan Devoy); Fill in the Frank; Slice of Seven (with Georgia Lines); Club Topicana; Guest Who; Beat the Ding
422	12	"Thursday 20 June 2024"	**Laura Daniel**; Bridget Davies, Joseph Moore	**Josh Thomson**; Mel Buttle, Tony Lyall	20 June 2024	**4**–2
Newsmakers; Guest Who; Fill in the Frank; Slice of Seven; Club Topicana; History (with Mark Inglis); Beat the Ding
423	13	"Thursday 27 June 2024"	**Melanie Bracewell**; Jack Ansett, Frankie McNair	**Dai Henwood**; Lana Walters, Cori Gonzalez-Macuer	27 June 2024	4–**6**
Newsmakers; Yes Minister (with Ashley Bloomfield); Fill in the Frank; Guest Who (with Paul Henry); Club Topicana; My Kid Could Draw That; Beat the Ding
424	14	"Thursday 4 July 2024"	**Chris Parker**; Abby Howells, Laura Daniel	**Eli Matthewson**; Bailey Poching, Joseph Moore	4 July 2024	**7**–4
Newsmakers; Guest Who; Fill in the Frank; Club Topicana; Slice of Seven (with Park Rd); Yes Minister (with Nigel Avery); Beat the Ding
425	15	"Thursday 11 July 2024"	**Melanie Bracewell**; Ray O'Leary, Rhys Mathewson	**Ben Hurley**; Madeleine Sami, Laura Daniel	11 July 2024	1–**6**
Newsmakers; Yes Minister (with Cameron Brewer); Fill in the Frank; Club Topicana; Slice of Seven (with Reiki Ruawai); Guest Who; Beat the Ding
426	16	"Thursday 18 July 2024"	**Paul Ego**; Brynley Stent, Tony Lyall	**Josh Thomson**; Angella Dravid, Guy Williams	18 July 2024	**6**–5
Newsmakers; Guest Who; Fill in the Frank; Slice of Seven (with Amy Shark); Club Topicana; Yes Minister (with Katie Nimon); Beat the Ding
427	17	"Thursday 25 July 2024"	**Hayley Sproull**; Abby Howells, Vaughan Smith	**Ben Hurley**; Lana Walters, Ed Byrne	25 July 2024	**5**–3
Newsmakers; Guest Who (with Levi Townley, FIM Motocross Junior World Championship 85cc winner); Fill in the Frank; Club Topicana; History; My Audience Could Draw That; Beat the Ding
428	18	"Thursday 1 August 2024"	**Josh Thomson**; Liv McKenzie, Guy Montgomery	**Dai Henwood**; Donna Brookbanks, Madeleine Sami	1 August 2024	4–**5**
Newsmakers; Guest Who; Fill in the Frank; Club Topicana; History (with Wayne Gould); My Kid Could Draw That; Beat the Ding
429	19	"Thursday 8 August 2024"	**Chris Parker**; Jack Ansett, Hayley Sproull	**Rhys Mathewson**; Michèle A'Court, Eli Matthewson	8 August 2024	**5**–4
Newsmakers; Yes Minister (with Patrick Gower); Fill in the Frank; Club Topicana; Guest Who (with Katie Trigg, 2024 Lexus Song Quest winner); Slice of Seven (with Flaxxies); Beat the Ding
430	20	"Thursday 15 August 2024"	**Hayley Sproull**; Lana Walters, Ben Hurley	**Dai Henwood**; Justine Smith, Jeremy Elwood	15 August 2024	**5**–4
Newsmakers; Yes Minister (with Tim Costley); Fill in the Frank; Club Topicana; Slice of Seven (with Valley Kids); Guest Who (with Abe Gray); Beat the Ding

=== Season 17 (2025) ===
The 17th season of 7 Days consisted of 15 episodes. It premiered on 3 April and introduced three new games: "The Sound of News-ic", "Beat the Audience", and "The Fast and the Sketchiest". Frank Energy sponsored the "Guest Who" segments, and Dole sponsored the "Club Topicana" segments. The season featured new graphics displaying the title of each segment.

No. overall	No. in season	Title	Team 1	Team 2	Original release date	Score
431	1	"Thursday 3 April 2025"	**Hayley Sproull**; Courtney Dawson, Josh Thomson	**Ben Hurley**; Bailey Poching, Justine Smith	3 April 2025	**6**–2
The Sound of News-ic; Guest Who (with Avila Allsop); Club Topicana; Slice of Seven (with Kirsten Morrell); History (with Linda McFetridge); Beat the Audience
432	2	"Thursday 10 April 2025"	**Heath Franklin** as Chopper; Lana Walters, Pax Assadi	**Dai Henwood**; Angella Dravid, Cori Gonzalez-Macuer	10 April 2025	1–**6**
The Sound of News-ic; Guest Who (with Luka Young); Club Topicana; Yes Minister (with Reuben Davidson); The Fast and the Sketchiest; Beat the Audience
433	3	"Thursday 17 April 2025"	**Paul Ego**; Bridget Davies, Joseph Moore	**Madeleine Sami**; Vaughan Smith, Justine Smith	17 April 2025	**6**–5
The Sound of News-ic; Guest Who; Club Topicana; Slice of Seven (with Frankie Venter); My Audience Could Draw That; Beat the Ding
434	4	"Thursday 24 April 2025"	**Mel Bracewell**; Emma Holland, Rhys Mathewson	**Dai Henwood**; Liv McKenzie, Tony Lyall	24 April 2025	1–**7**
The Sound of News-ic; Yes Minister (with Andy Foster); Club Topicana; History; Guest Who (with M'Lago Morris); Beat the Audience
435	5	"Thursday 1 May 2025"	**Josh Thomson**; Lana Walters, Chris Parker	**Heath Franklin** as Chopper; Mark Simmons, Felicity Ward	1 May 2025	**5**–2
The Sound of News-ic; Guest Who (with Logan Rogerson); Slice of Seven (with Shannon Beresford as Taylor Swift); Club Topicana; History; Beat the Audience "New Zealand vs. The World"-themed episode for the 2025 New Zealand International Comedy Festival
436	6	"Thursday 8 May 2025"	**Laura Daniel**; Becky Umbers, Joseph Moore	**Ben Hurley**; Laura Lexx, Nazeem Hussain	8 May 2025	3–**5**
The Sound of News-ic; History (with Judy Speight); Club Topicana; My Kid Could Draw That; Guest Who (with Simon Berry of Whitestone Cheese); Beat the Ding
437	7	"Thursday 15 May 2025"	**Paul Ego**; Brynley Stent, Hayley Sproull	**Rhys Mathewson**; Emma Holland, Jack Ansett	15 May 2025	2–**5**
The Sound of News-ic; Yes Minister (with David Parker); Club Topicana; Slice of Seven (with Rodney Fisher of Goodshirt); Guest Who (with Bubbah Olo); Beat the Audience
438	8	"Thursday 22 May 2025"	**Guy Montgomery**; Kura Forrester, Lana Walters	**Ben Hurley**; Becky Umbers, Cori Gonzalez-Macuer	22 May 2025	3–**5**
The Sound of News-ic; Guest Who (with Christian-Ray Simons); Club Topicana; Slice of Seven (with Devilskin); History (with Lydia Sewell of the Auckland Philharmonia); Beat the Audience
439	9	"Thursday 29 May 2025"	**Josh Thomson**; Paul Douglas, Madeleine Sami	**Alex Ward**; Abby Howells, Heath Franklin as Chopper	29 May 2025	**6**–2
The Sound of News-ic; Yes Minister (with Ayesha Verrall); Club Topicana; Guest Who; My Kid Could Draw That; Beat the Audience
440	10	"Thursday 5 June 2025"	**Chris Parker**; Angella Dravid, Tony Lyall	**Hayley Sproull**; Brynley Stent, Jack Ansett	5 June 2025	**6**–3
The Sound of News-ic; Guest Who (with Nigel Bowen, mayor of Timaru); Club Topicana; Slice of Seven (with Makayla); History (with Warren "Possum" Allen); Beat the Ding
441	11	"Thursday 12 June 2025"	**Paul Ego**; Lana Walters, Cori Gonzalez-Macuer	**Eli Matthewson**; Bridget Davies, Josh Thomson	12 June 2025	**4**–3
The Sound of News-ic; Yes Minister (with Tangi Utikere); Club Topicana; Guest Who (with Flynn MacGill-Brown); Slice of Seven (with Jazmine Mary); Beat the Ding
442	12	"Thursday 19 June 2025"	**Rhys Mathewson**; Emma Holland, Ray O'Leary	**Ben Hurley**; Liv McKenzie, Justine Smith	19 June 2025	**5**–4
The Sound of News-ic; Yes Minister (with Wayne Brown); Club Topicana; Guest Who (with Jayden Young); History (with Michelle Sadgrove); Beat the Ding
443	13	"Thursday 26 June 2025"	**Mel Bracewell**; Kura Forrester, Guy Montgomery	**Dai Henwood**; Guy Williams, Hayley Sproull	26 June 2025	3–**5**
The Sound of News-ic; Guest Who (with Shae Parsons, Miss Earth 2025); Slice of Seven (with Georgia Lines); Club Topicana; My Kid Could Draw That; Beat the Audience
444	14	"Thursday 3 July 2025"	**Ben Hurley**; Abby Howells, Madeleine Sami	**Josh Thomson**; Alex Ward, Eli Matthewson	3 July 2025	4–**6**
The Sound of News-ic; Guest Who (with Lisette Reymer); Slice of Seven (with Kaylee Bell); Club Topicana; My Audience Could Draw That; Beat the Ding
445	15	"Thursday 10 July 2025"	**Paul Ego**; Chris Parker, Justine Smith	**Dai Henwood**; Brynley Stent, Mel Bracewell	10 July 2025	**3**–**3**
The Sound of News-ic; Yes Minister (with Abby Plom and Ryan Grant-Derepa); Club Topicana; Slice of Seven (with The Western Guide); Guest Who (with Hugh Jackson, 2025 FMG Young Farmer of the Year); Caption That Sponsored by Superman (2025)

=== Season 18 (2026) ===
The 18th season of 7 Days comprised 20 episodes. The show featured a redesigned set, logo, and theme song. BurgerFuel became a new sponsor.

No. overall	No. in season	Title	Team 1	Team 2	Original release date	Score
446	1	"Thursday 19 February 2026"	**Rhys Mathewson**; Jack Ansett, Brynley Stent	**Dai Henwood**; Abby Howells, Justine Smith	19 February 2026	5–**6**
Newsmakers; Yes Minister (with Qiulae Wong); Brain Grill (part 1); Slice of Seven (with The Beths); Brain Grill (part 2); Club Topicana; Come On, Feel the News; Brain Grill (part 3); Beat the Ding
447	2	"Thursday 26 February 2026"	**Chris Parker**; Johanna Cosgrove, Emma Holland	**Ben Hurley**; Hoani Hotene, Lana Walters	26 February 2026	**6**–3
Newsmakers; Guest Who (with Chitty of Hokonui Southland); Brain Grill (part 1); Club Topicana; Slice of Seven (with Muroki); Brain Grill (part 2); Charade the News; Brain Grill (part 3); Beat the Ding
448	3	"Thursday 5 March 2026"	**Paul Ego**; Becky Umbers, Josh Thomson	**Hayley Sproull**; Lesa Macleod-Whiting, Tony Lyall	5 March 2026	**3**–**3**
Newsmakers; Guest Who (with Portia Woodman); Brain Grill (part 1); Club Topicana; Brain Grill (part 2); History (with Chunli Li); Ping Pong the News; Brain Grill (part 3); Caption That; Beat the Ding
449	4	"Thursday 12 March 2026"	**Ben Hurley**; Abby Howells, Cori Gonzalez-Macuer	**Laura Daniel**; Kura Forrester, Lloyd Langford	12 March 2026	**3**–2
Newsmakers; Guest Who (with 2026 Golden Shears winner Toa Henderson); Brain Grill (part 1); Slice of Seven (with Borderline); Brain Grill (part 2); Club Topicana; Your Family Could Draw That; Brain Grill (part 3); Caption That
450	5	"Thursday 19 March 2026"	**Rhys Mathewson**; Barnie Duncan, Brynley Stent	**Dai Henwood**; Angela Dravid, Chris Parker	19 March 2026	2–**4**
Newsmakers; Yes Minister (with Cushla Tangaere-Manuel); Brain Grill (part 1); Club Topicana; Brain Grill (part 2); My Kid Could Draw That; Charade the News; Brain Grill (part 3); Captions
451	6	"Thursday 26 March 2026"	**Josh Thomson**; Michèle A'Court, Jeremy Elwood	**Jack Ansett**; Cori Gonzalez-Macuer, Justine Smith	26 March 2026	1–**6**
Newsmakers; Guest Who (with Buck Shelford); Brain Grill (part 1); Slice of Seven (with Cassie Henderson); Club Topicana; Brain Grill (part 2); Answers; Brain Grill (part 3); Beat the Ding
452	7	"Thursday 2 April 2026"	**Paul Ego**; Bridget Davies, Tony Lyall	**Hayley Sproull**; Liv McKenzie, Josh Thomson	2 April 2026	**3**–2
Newsmakers; Slice of Seven (with Where's Jai); Brain Grill (part 1); Club Topicana; Brain Grill (part 2); History; Easter Egg the News; Brain Grill (part 3); Caption That
453	8	"Thursday 9 April 2026"	**Paul Ego**; Lana Walters, Jeremy Elwood	**Heath Franklin** (as Chopper); Courtney Dawson, Cori Gonzalez-Macuer	9 April 2026	**4**–1
Newsmakers; Yes Minister (with James Meager); Brain Grill (part 1); Club Topicana; Brain Grill (part 2); Charade the News; Guest Who (with Jono Ridler); Brain Grill (part 3); Caption That
454	9	"Thursday 16 April 2026"	**Ben Hurley**; Angela Dravid, Tony Lyall	**Dai Henwood**; Bailey Poching, Justine Smith	16 April 2026	**3**–2
Newsmakers; Yes Minister (with Cameron Luxton); Brain Grill (part 1); Club Topicana; Slice of Seven (with Tusekah); Brain Grill (part 2); Guest Who (with Selina Goddard); Brain Grill (part 3); Caption That
455	10	"Thursday 23 April 2026"	**Madeleine Sami**; Anthony Crum, Josh Thomson	**Rhys Mathewson**; Bubbah, Brynley Stent	23 April 2026	2–**5**
Newsmakers; Guest Who (with Suzy Cato); Club Topicana; Brain Grill (part 1); Slice of Seven (with Paige); History (with Vanessa Kelly of Deep Obsession); Brain Grill (part 3); Beat the Ding
456	11	"Thursday 30 April 2026"	**Chris Parker**; Elouise Eftos, Ray O'Leary	**Josh Thomson**; Emmanuel Sonubi, Justine Smith	30 April 2026	**4**–**4**
Newsmakers; Yes Minister (with Chris Hipkins); Brain Grill (part 1); Club Topicana; Brain Grill (part 2); Charading the News; My Kid Could Draw That; Brain Grill (part 3); Beat the Ding
457	12	"Thursday 7 May 2026"	**Paul Ego**; Hayley Sproull, Rhys Mathewson	**Felicity Ward**; He Huang, Jimmy McGhie	7 May 2026	4–**5**
Newsmakers; Guest Who (with Dan Hall); Brain Grill (part 1); Slice of Seven (with Corrella); Brain Grill (part 2); Draw the News; Club Topicana; Brain Grill (part 3); Beat the Ding NZ vs. The World
458	13	"Thursday 14 May 2026"	**Melanie Bracewell**; Rosco McLelland, Justine Smith	**Josh Thomson**; Bailey Poching, Heath Franklin (as Chopper)	14 May 2026	2–**4**
Newsmakers; Slice of Seven (with Te Wehi); Brain Grill (part 1); Club Topicana; Brain Grill (part 2); Charade the News; My Audience Could Draw That; Brain Grill (part 3); Captions
459	14	"Thursday 21 May 2026"	**Ben Hurley**; Carl Donnelly, Emma Holland	**Melanie Bracewell**; Johanna Cosgrove, Nazeem Hussain	21 May 2026	**4**–2
Newsmakers; Guest Who (with Billy Stairmand); Brain Grill (part 1); Slice of Seven (with Star); Brain Grill (part 2); Club Topicana; Come On Feel The News; Brain Grill (part 3); Captions
460	15	"Thursday 28 May 2026"	**Laura Daniel**; Jessie Nixon, Joseph Moore	**Ben Hurley**; Henry Yan, Chris Parker	28 May 2026	**3**–2
Newsmakers; Guest Who (with Delilah Flavell); Brain Grill (part 1); Club Topicana; Slice of Seven; Brain Grill (part 2); History; Brain Grill (part 3); Caption That
461	16	"Thursday 4 June 2026"	**Guy Montgomery**; Brynley Stent, Josh Thomson	**Hayley Sproull**; Alex Ward, Jack Ansett	4 June 2026	**5**–3
Newsmakers; Guest Who (with Rove McManus); Brain Grill (part 1); Club Topicana; Brain Grill (part 2); My Audience Could Draw That; Brain Grill (part 3); Yes Minister (with Willow-Jean Prime); Beat the Ding
462	17	"Thursday 11 June 2026"	**Paul Ego**; Bridget Davies, Cori Gonzalez-Macuer	**Joseph Moore**; Tony Lyall, Justine Smith	11 June 2026	**3**–2
Newsmakers; Yes Minister (with Kahurangi Carter); Brain Grill (part 1); Club Topicana; Slice of Seven (with Simon Thompson); Brain Grill (part 2); History; Brain Grill (part 3); Captions
463	18	"Thursday 18 June 2026"	**Chris Parker**; Emma Holland, Ray O'Leary	**Laura Daniel**; Lana Walters, Rhys Mathewson	18 June 2026	2–**4**
Newsmakers; Guest Who; Brain Grill (part 1); Club Topicana; Brain Grill (part 2); Charading the News; My Kid Could Draw That; Brain Grill (part 3); Caption That
464	19	"Thursday 25 June 2026"	**Hayley Sproull**; Barnie Duncan, Josh Thomson	**Ben Hurley**; Angela Dravid, Joseph Moore	25 June 2026	**3**–**3**
Newsmakers; Yes Minister (with Tom Rutherford); Brain Grill (part 1); Club Topicana; Brain Grill (part 2); History; Slice of Seven (with Mel Parsons); Brain Grill (part 3); Beat the Ding
465	20	"Thursday 2 July 2026"	**Paul Ego**; Justine Smith, Ben Hurley	**Mel Bracewell**; Abby Howells, Guy Montgomery	2 July 2026	2–**3**
Newsmakers; Yes Minister (with Desley Simpson); Brain Grill (part 1); Club Topicana; Slice of Seven (with the Wellington Sea Shanty Society); Brain Grill (part 2); Charade the News; Caption That

=== Specials ===
Occasionally a special edition of 7 Days screens, breaking out of the show's traditional format. Examples of such specials are:

No.	Title	Original release date
18	"7 Days 12 Months – Our Year in Review"	30 December 2009
Focusing on news stories for the whole of 2009.
TBA	"Season 4 Best Of 2012"	14 December 2012
TBA	"The Best of 7 Days 2016"	11 November 2016
TBA	"7 Days New Zealand vs Australia"	8 October 2010
A competition between a team of New Zealanders and Australians.

In addition, there are several "road" episodes where the show has been taken outside the Auckland studio to other centres on New Zealand, including Christchurch (2011 and 2012) and Queenstown (2012). Nearly all of these episodes feature the game 'Yes Minister' with the local mayor or another local figure (the Wizard of New Zealand appeared in the 2012 Christchurch episode) as the "minister".
