= YFC =

YFC may refer to the following:

- National Federation of Young Farmers' Clubs, a British youth club which helps support young people in agriculture and the countryside
- Young Farmers Club, regional clubs affiliated with New Zealand Young Farmers
- Youth for Christ, a Christian organization often abbreviated to YFC
- The IATA airport code for Fredericton International Airport, New Brunswick, Canada
- Yadanarbon F.C., an association football club in Myanmar
- Ypiranga Futebol Clube, a Brazilian professional association football club

France / Belgique

- Youth For climate, mouvement of young People for à social and climate justice
