= Young Farmers' Club =

Young Farmers' Club may refer to:

- National Federation of Young Farmers' Clubs in England & Wales
- Regional clubs affiliated to New Zealand Young Farmers
