= Ben Hurley =

New Zealand comedian

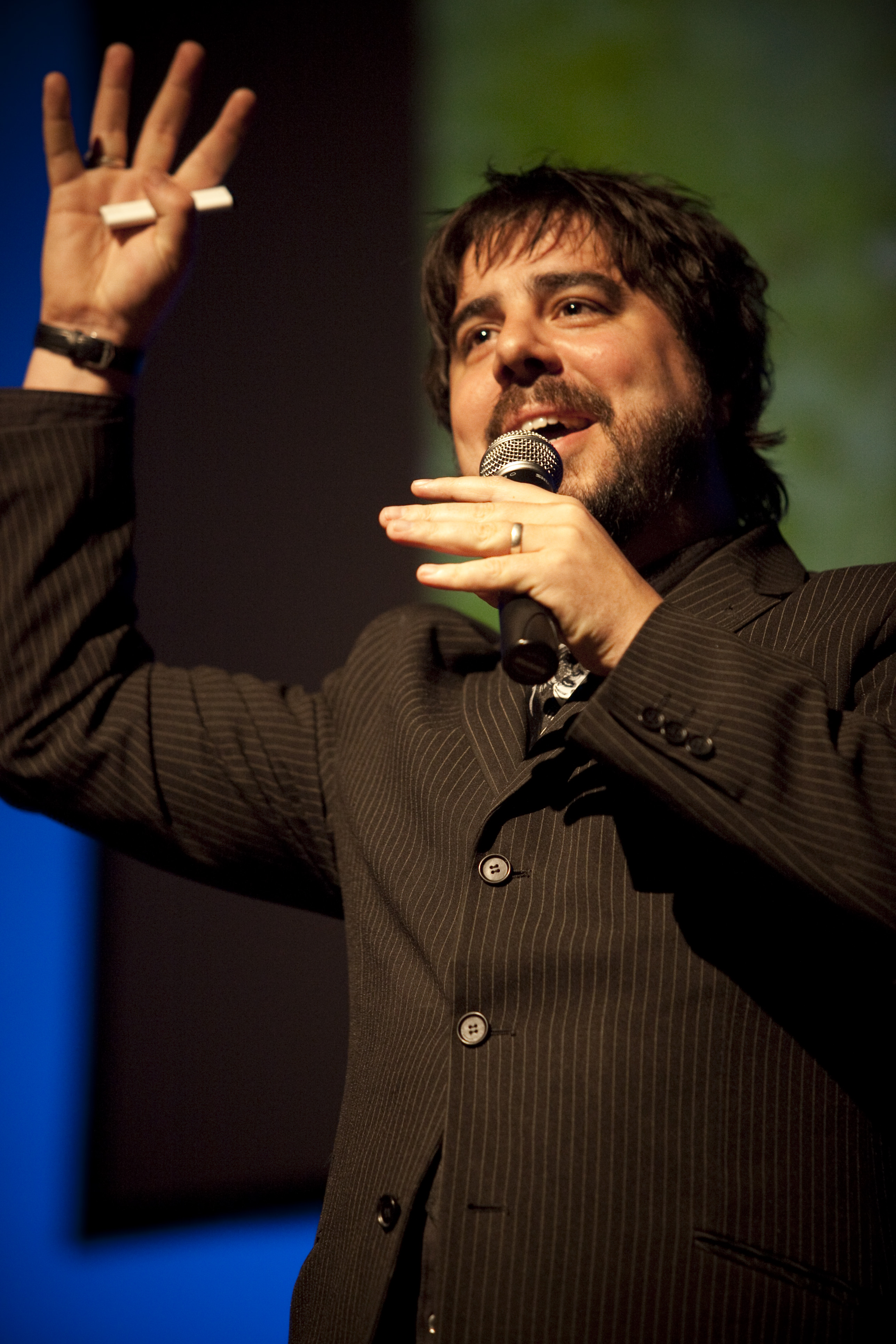
Hurley at the 2009 TechFest

Ben Hurley is a stand-up comedian from New Zealand. Hurley started his comedy career in Wellington as resident host of The Wellington Comedy Club. After winning the Billy T Award he moved to London and worked on the comedy circuit there between 2005 and 2008. He has supported the likes of Andy Parsons, Stewart Lee and Ed Byrne on their UK tours. He has performed as part of the New Zealand International Comedy Festival 10 years in a row.

His comedy is largely based on his experiences growing up in the rural Taranaki region of New Zealand but also deals with topics like relationships, religion, music, politics and his family. He is constantly touring, having played all over the UK, Ireland, Asia, Australia and New Zealand.

Hurley's TV credits in New Zealand include the TV3 panel show 7 Days, on which he serves as a writer and core cast member. He has also featured in 8 NZ Comedy Festival Galas, in the AotearoHA series Funny Roots and his own stand-up comedy special called After Hours. In 2021 he appeared on the panel show Patriot Brains. In 2024, he appeared as a contestant in season 5 of Taskmaster New Zealand.

== NZ Comedy Festival Shows ==
- 2002, Comedion (with Steve Wrigley and mrs.peacock)
- 2003, Bigger than Ben Hurley
- 2004, Political and Stuff
- 2005, Comedy Convoy (with Stewart Lee, Rhys Darby, Michèle A’Court and Carl Barron)
- 2006, Here I Go Again On My Own
- 2007, The Big Show (with Mickey D and Alun Cochrane)
- 2008, Boom!
- 2009, Actually, I Do Mind
- 2010, Ultra Mega Alright
- 2011, Do the Evolution
- 2012, Live and Unleashed (with Steve Wrigley)
- 2013, More Live and More Unleashed (with Steve Wrigley)
- 2014, The Reckoning
- 2015, Ben Defend New Zealand (with guests)
- 2016, Earth, Planet, World
- 2017, 22 Rants About Fuck

== Awards ==
- 2002 TV2's Pulp Comedy Best New Face
- 2004 Billy T Award Winner
- 2004 NZ Comedy Guild Best Male Comedian
- 2008 Fred Dagg Award Winner
