= Valkyrie (disambiguation) =

A valkyrie is a figure in Norse mythology.

Valkyrie, Valkyria, and Walküre may also refer to:

== Arts and media ==
=== Fictional characters ===
- Valkyrie Cain, in Skulduggery Pleasant
- Valkyrie (Marvel Comics), a superhero
- In UFO Ultramaiden Valkyrie
- An organization in Strong Female Protagonist
- In Valkyrie no Bōken
- In Tom Clancy's Rainbow Six Siege
- In Clash of Clans
- In Apex Legends
- Kamen Rider Valkyrie, in Kamen Rider Zero-One
- In Ensemble Stars!

=== Fictional vehicles and weapons ===
- Valkyrie Missile Frigate, in the game StarCraft
- Valkyrie SSTO-TAV-37 B-class, a shuttlecraft from the film Avatar
- A missile in Call of Duty: Black Ops
- A weapon in Destiny 2
- An aircraft carrier in the game Battlefield 4
- VF-1 Valkyrie, an aircraft in the Macross series
- An aircraft in Captain America: The First Avenger

=== Film and television ===
- "The Valkyrie", an episode of Highlander: The Series (season 5)
- Valkyrie Drive, a TV series and game
- Stauffenberg (film), a 2004 German film known as Operation Valkyrie in international release
- Valkyrie (film), 2008, U.S. film starring Tom Cruise based on Operation Valkyrie
- The Valkyrie Legacy, a 2008 documentary film by Kevin Burns about Operation Valkyrie
- Shuumatsu no Valkyrie, Japanese name for the manga and anime series Record of Ragnarok

=== Games ===
- Eve: Valkyrie, a VR game
- Valkyria Chronicles, a video game series
- Valkyrie Profile, a game series

=== Music ===
- The Valkyrie (Die Walküre), an opera by Richard Wagner
- Valkyrie (album)
- Valkyrie (American band)
- Valkyrie (New Zealand band)
- Valkyrien Allstars, a Norwegian band
- "Valkyrie", a 2019 song by Oneus
- "Valkyrie", a song by Battle Tapes on the 2015 album Polygon
- "Valkyrie", a song by Wolfheart on the 2018 album Constellation of the Black Light
- Valkyrien, a ballet by Hartmann
- "Valkyries", a song by Amberian Dawn on the 2008 album River of Tuoni
- "Valkyries", a song by Blind Guardian on the 2010 album At the Edge of Time
- Valkyrja (album), by Týr, 2-13
- Walküre (band), a fictional band from Macross Delta anime

=== Written media ===
- The Valkyries, a 1992 novel by Paulo Coelho
- The Valkyrie, a 2023 novel by Kate Heartfield
- Valkyrie (magazine)

== Transportation ==
=== Aerospace ===
- ASL Valkyrie, an aeroplane series
- Cobalt Co50 Valkyrie, experimental aircraft
- Kratos XQ-58 Valkyrie, an unmanned aircraft
- North American XB-70 Valkyrie, a bomber aircraft
- Project Valkyrie, a theoretical spacecraft
- Valkiri, a South African rocket launcher

=== Automotive ===
- Honda Valkyrie, a motorcycle range
- Aston Martin Valkyrie, a supercar

=== Sea ===
- Valkyrie II, 1893, UK, in America's Cup
- Valkyrie III, 1895, UK, in America's Cup
- Walküre, a ship sunk in the 1914 Bombardment of Papeete

== Sports ==
- Valkyrie (mixed martial arts), Japan
- Minnesota Valkyrie, a US football team
- Orlando Valkyries, a professional volleyball team
- Taya Valkyrie, a Canadian wrestler
- York Valkyrie, an English women's rugby league team
- Golden State Valkyries, an WNBA expansion team beginning play in 2025

== Places ==
- Dome F, also called "Valkyrie Dome", a Japanese Antarctic base
- Valkyrie plass in Oslo, Norway
- Valkyrie, Queensland, a rural locality in Australia

== Other uses ==
- Operation Valkyrie, WWII German continuity-of-government leadership succession plan, that was utilized in an assassination plot
- 20 July plot, 1944 WWII German Army plot to assassinate Hitler and utilize Operation Valkyrie contingency plan
- .224 Valkyrie, a rifle cartridge
- Walküre Porzellanfabrik, a porcelain manufacturer in Bayreuth, Germany (1899–2019)
- Valkyrie (robot), a humanoid robot developed by NASA in 2013

== See also ==
- Valkyria (disambiguation)
- Valkyrae (Rachel Hofstetter, born 1992), American live streamer
- Ride of the Valkyries (disambiguation)
- Valkyrien (disambiguation)
- La vache qui rit, a French cheese and originally a play on the word Walküre
