= Valkyrie (comics) =

Valkyrie, in comics, may refer to:

- Valkyrie, a Golden Age villain and later ally of Airboy published by Hillman Periodicals
- Valkyrie (Marvel Comics), two Marvel Comics superheroes
  - Valkyrior, the group to which the heroine belongs
- Valkyrie, revival of the Hillman character, published by Eclipse Comics in their Airboy comics as well as in her own special and mini-series
- Comic Valkyrie, a Japanese manga magazines published by Kill Time Communication, Inc.
- Valkyries, a story that appeared in 2000 AD

== See also ==
- Valkyrie (disambiguation)
