= Valkyrie plass station =

Former Oslo metro station

Coordinates: 59°55′41″N 10°43′06″E

Valkyrie plass
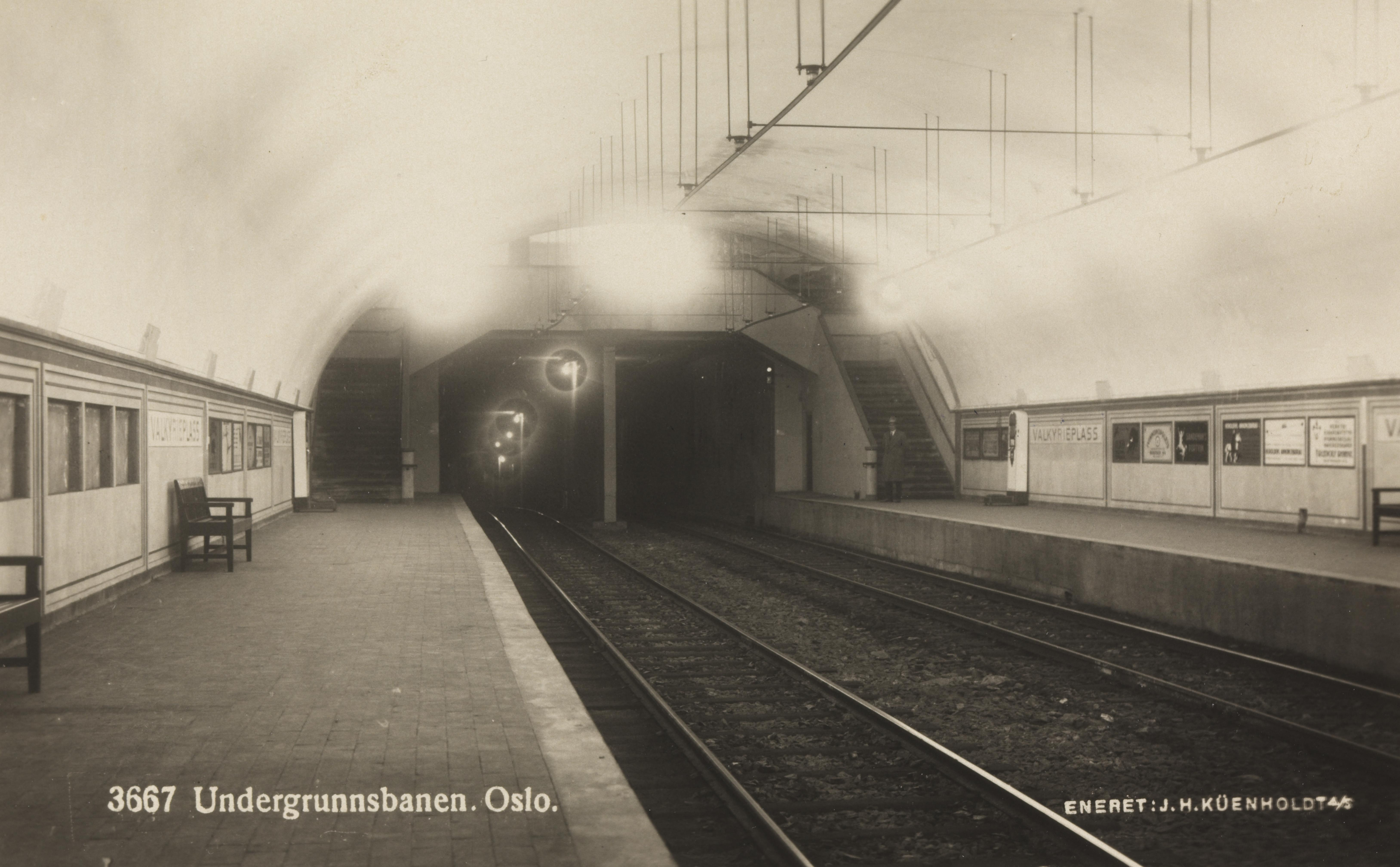
- The station while it was operational

General information
- Location: Valkyrie plass, Oslo; Norway
- Elevation: 41.5 metres (136 ft)
- Line: Common Tunnel
- Distance: 2.4 kilometres (1.5 mi) from Stortinget

Construction
- Structure type: Underground

History
- Opened: 28 June 1928
- Closed: 1985
Location

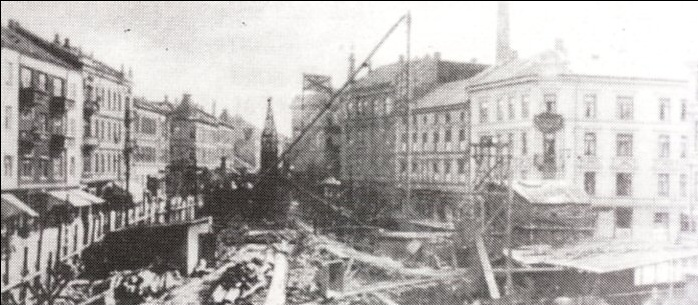
Construction in the 1920s

Valkyrie plass was a metro station and a tram station on the Oslo Metro and the Oslo Tramway.

The station was opened when the Holmenkollen Line was extended from Majorstuen to Nationaltheatret on 28 June 1928. The station was built in neoclassical style, and the architect was Kristofer Andreas Lange.

Though not originally planned, when 800 m^{2} of the street collapsed during the construction of the first parts of Fellestunnelen, a station was built anyway. It was closed in 1985 due its proximity to Majorstuen, and it was both difficult and dangerous to expand the station to accommodate trains with more than two cars (which was needed for the conversion of the western lines to metro).

Valkyrie plass was also a light rail station on the Briskeby Line of the Oslo Tramway, between Schultz gate in the east and the terminus Majorstuen in the west. It was closed in 2004.

The former station building is now used as an independent fast food café, but the staircase to the platform is maintained to provide access to emergency and maintenance personnel and act as an emergency exit. Inside the former station there were illuminated billboards behind the platforms; however, as of December 2013, the billboards are gone and the backlights are either broken or missing.

The station was an important location in the 2017 Norwegian TV-series Valkyrien.

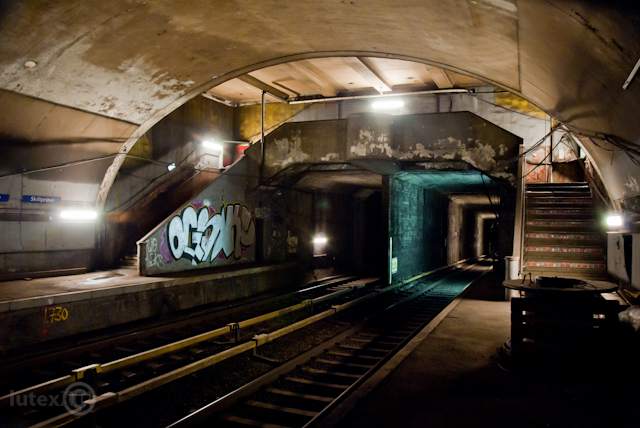
Valkyrie Plass, August 2011
