= Justine Smith =

New Zealand comedian and actor

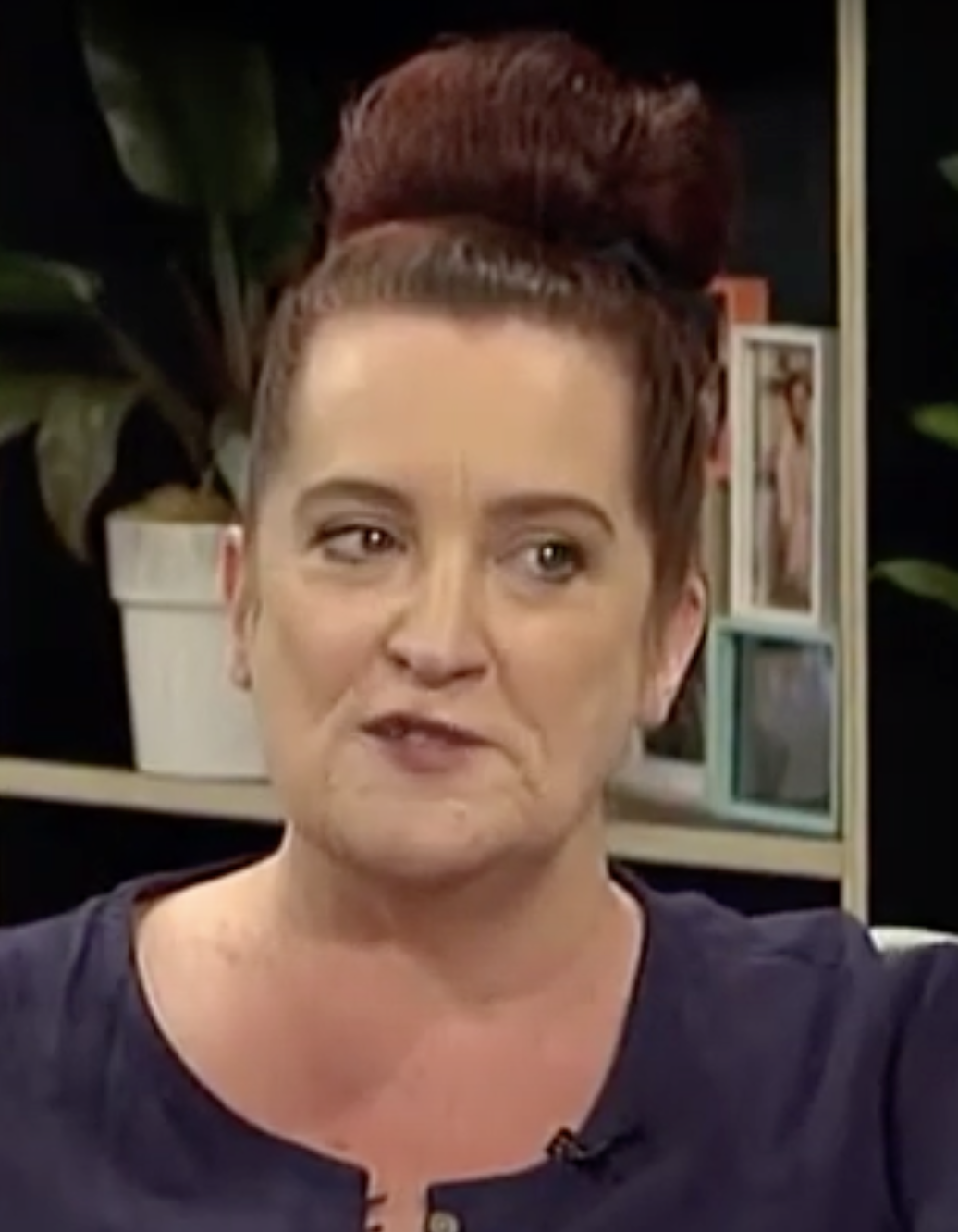
- Smith in 2017
- Born: 1967 or 1968 (age 57–58); Auckland, New Zealand
- Occupations: Comedian; actress; writer
- Known for: 7 Days; Taskmaster NZ
- Awards: Billy T Award (2003); NZ Comedy Guild, Best Female Comedian (2008, 2015, 2017)

Comedy career
- Years active: 1997–present
- Medium: Television; stand-up
- Website: justinesmith.co.nz

Justine Smith is a New Zealand comedian, writer, and actress.

== Early life ==
Smith was born in Auckland and adopted by and raised in a self-described "conservative" family in Wainoni in Christchurch, New Zealand. Smith has an older sister. Her grandfather, Bill Ramsay, had been a comedian. She attended Avonside Girls' High School until she was sixteen, when she moved to Auckland to attend art school.

Smith has a degree in film and photography. After graduating, she worked in hospitality.

== Career ==
Smith started her career in comedy after doing a stand-up gig in 1997. She went on to win the Billy T Award in 2003 for her show The Justine Smith Hour. Smith briefly quit comedy in 2014.

Smith is the first female head writer and a regular panelist on 7 Days, and she has appeared on The Project. In 2022, Smith appeared on the third series of Taskmaster NZ. She has also been on Pulp Comedy, Have You Been Paying Attention?, and hosted the New Zealand International Comedy Festival Comedy Gala in 2021. Smith also appeared in an advertisement, produced by the New Zealand government for its "Keep It Real Online" campaign, that went viral. In 2023, she appeared on the New Zealand version of The Traitors. Smith was a contestant on Guy Montgomery's Guy Mont-Spelling Bee in 2024. She hosted the Wellington Raw Comedy Quest final in August 2024.

She also won the NZ Comedy Guild's Best Female Comedian award three times, in 2008, 2015, and 2017.

Shows performed by Smith include Actually I'm a Cat Person, The Justine Smith Hour (2003), Return of the Jussi (2008), and Jussi Town (2010). She and Irene Pink have performed two shows together, I'm Sorry I Said That and The Pitch.

She has cited Bill Bailey as an inspiration, as well as Lucille Ball, Carol Burnett, Bette Midler, and Betty White.

== Personal life ==
Smith lived in Japan for a year in her 20s.

Smith married her husband Dan Crozier in 2015. They live in Te Atatū Peninsula with their two cats. She collects toys and enjoys decorating for Christmas.
