= Ride of the Valkyries (disambiguation) =

"Ride of the Valkyries" is the popular term for the music of the beginning of act 3 of Richard Wagner's opera Die Walküre.

Ride of the Valkyrie(s) may also refer to:

- Ride of the Valkyrie (1967 film)
- The Ride of the Valkyrs, a 1909 painting by John Charles Dollman
- "Hard Drive Courage / The Ride of the Valkyries", an episode of Courage the Cowardly Dog

== See also ==
- Flight of the Valkyries, an annual metal festival in the United States
- Valkyrie (disambiguation)
