= Valkyrien (disambiguation) =

Valkyrien is a Norwegian TV series.

Valkyrien may also refer to:

- HNoMS Valkyrien, any of several ships in the Royal Norwegian Navy
- Valda Valkyrien (1895–1956), Danish actress

== See also ==
- Valkyrie (disambiguation)
