= Valkyria =

Valkyria may refer to:

- A variant of valkyrie, or valkyrja, a supernatural female figure in Norse mythology
- Lyra Valkyria, an Irish professional wrestler
- Valkyria (roller coaster), a roller coaster at Liseberg, Gothenburg, Sweden
- Valkyria Chronicles, a series of tactical role-playing video games
- Valkyria Chronicles (video game), the first game in the series
- "Valkyria", song by Amon Amarth

== See also ==
- Valkyrie (disambiguation)
