= Michèle A'Court =

New Zealand comedian and writer

Michèle A'Court ONZM
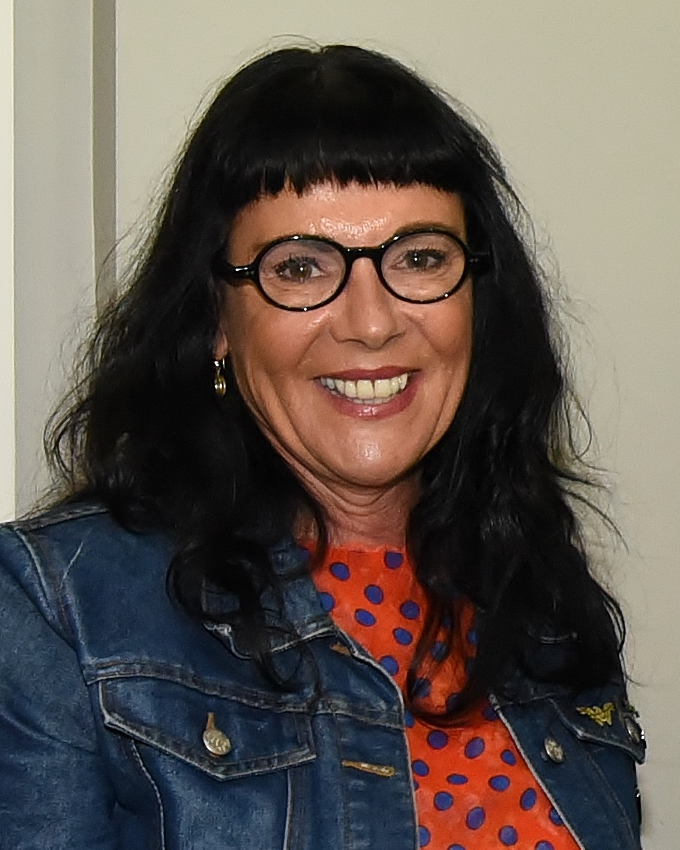
- A'Court in 2018
- Born: 1961 (age 64–65)
- Education: Victoria University of Wellington
- Occupations: Comedian; writer
- Spouse: Jeremy Elwood
- Children: 1
- Awards: Female Comedian of the Decade at the New Zealand Comedy Awards 2010; VAC Reilly Award for Excellence in Comedy (2015)

Michèle Edith A'Court ONZM (born 1961) is a New Zealand comedian, writer and feminist. She has toured New Zealand and international venues with her standup comedy shows and in 2010 was awarded the Female Comedian of the Decade at the NZ Comedy Guild Awards. A'Court has appeared in many TV shows since the late 1980s including What Now, 7Days and The Project. She is a regular columnist with The Spinoff and the author of two books. She was appointed an Officer of the New Zealand Order of Merit, for services to the entertainment and comedy industries, in the 2023 New Year Honours.

== Biography ==
A'Court trained in journalism, and has a degree in English literature and drama from Victoria University of Wellington. In the mid-1980s she worked as a TVNZ publicist. She then got a job as a host on children's television show What Now starting in 1987. She saw comedy as a vehicle for social activism as a feminist as well as making people feel 'better about life'. When she was young was inspired by the comedy of Danny Kaye and Carol Burnett. When she started doing stand-up comedy in the 1990s there were very few women. A'Court acknowledged in 2022 the fight for women to get a fairer representation as performers was continuing and also recognised that comedy billing that used to be often one woman per show only, are now often a 50:50 ratio. In stand-up A'Court has toured New Zealand and performed around the world including Las Vegas, Edinburgh, and Vancouver. A'Court supported the comedy industry of New Zealand by establishing the New Zealand Comedy Guild and she was the chairperson from 1999 to 2006.

Since 2009 A'Court regularly appears on the comedy TV show 7Days and since 2018 has been a regular host on the current affairs programme The Project (both on the New Zealand Three TV channel). Some recent stand-up comedy performances include headlining Mt Eden Comedy with Michele A'Court in 2015, and Friday Laughs in 2022 alongside her husband, comedian Jeremy Elwood.

A'Court has written two books. Her first book, Stuff I Forgot To Tell My Daughter (2015), was based on her stand-up comedy show of the same name. A'Court has written guest columns for Stuff and is a guest writer for The Spinoff.

== Books ==
- Stuff I Forgot To Tell My Daughter (2015)
- How We Met (2018)
- Foreword – Funny As: The Story of New Zealand Comedy

== Selected screenography ==
- L&P Top Town (1986) Final
- What Now? (1987–1988), Presenter, Writer – Television
- Choice Not Chance (1992), Presenter – Short Film
- Pulp Comedy (1995–2003), Subject – Television
- Comedy Central (1995–1997), As: Various roles – Television
- Newsflash (1998), Writer – Television
- A Kiwi Christmas (1998), Narrator – Television
- Teen Sex (2005), Narrator – Television
- Breakfast (2006–2008), Presenter – Television
- Shortland Street (2008–2009), Writer, As: Helen Carson – Television
- 7 Days (2009) – ongoing, Subject – Television
- Staines Down Drains – Fool's Gold (2011), Writer, As: Mary–Jane Staines, Herk and Beanz – Television
- A Night at the Classic (2012), As: Michele – Television
- Go Girls (2013), As: Miriam Hirsch – Television
- Funny As: The Story of New Zealand Comedy (2019), Subject – Television
- The Project (2018) – ongoing, Presenter – Television
- On the Rag (2019–2022), Presenter – Web

== Awards and nominations ==
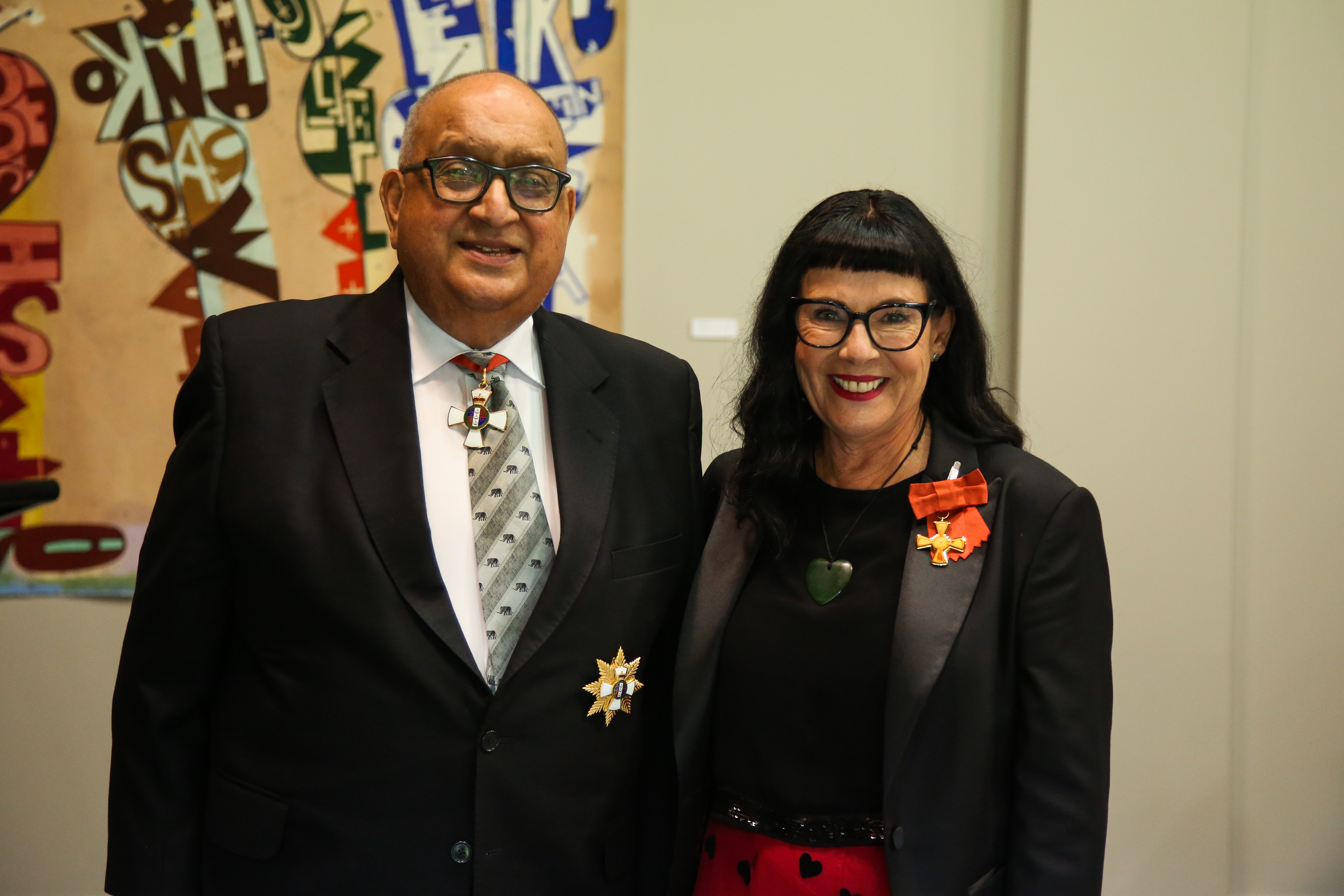
A'Court (right), after her investiture as an Officer of the New Zealand Order of Merit by the former governor-general, Sir Anand Satyanand, at Government House, Auckland, on 12 April 2023

- Special Recognition Award for Excellence in Presentation (1991): Choice Not Chance ITVA Awards (New Zealand arm of the International Television Association)
- Female Comedian of the Decade (2010) New Zealand Comedy Awards (NZ Comedy Guild)
- VAC Reilly Award for Excellence in Comedy (2015)
- Nominated – Best Presenter: Entertainment (2020) (with Leonie Hayden and Alex Casey): On the Rag New Zealand Television Awards
- Appointed Officer of the New Zealand Order of Merit in the 2023 New Year Honours, for services to the entertainment and comedy industries

== Personal life ==
A'Court lives in Auckland and is married to comedian Jeremy Elwood.
