= Valkyrie plass =

Square in Oslo, Norway

Coordinates: 59.9284°N 10.71769°E

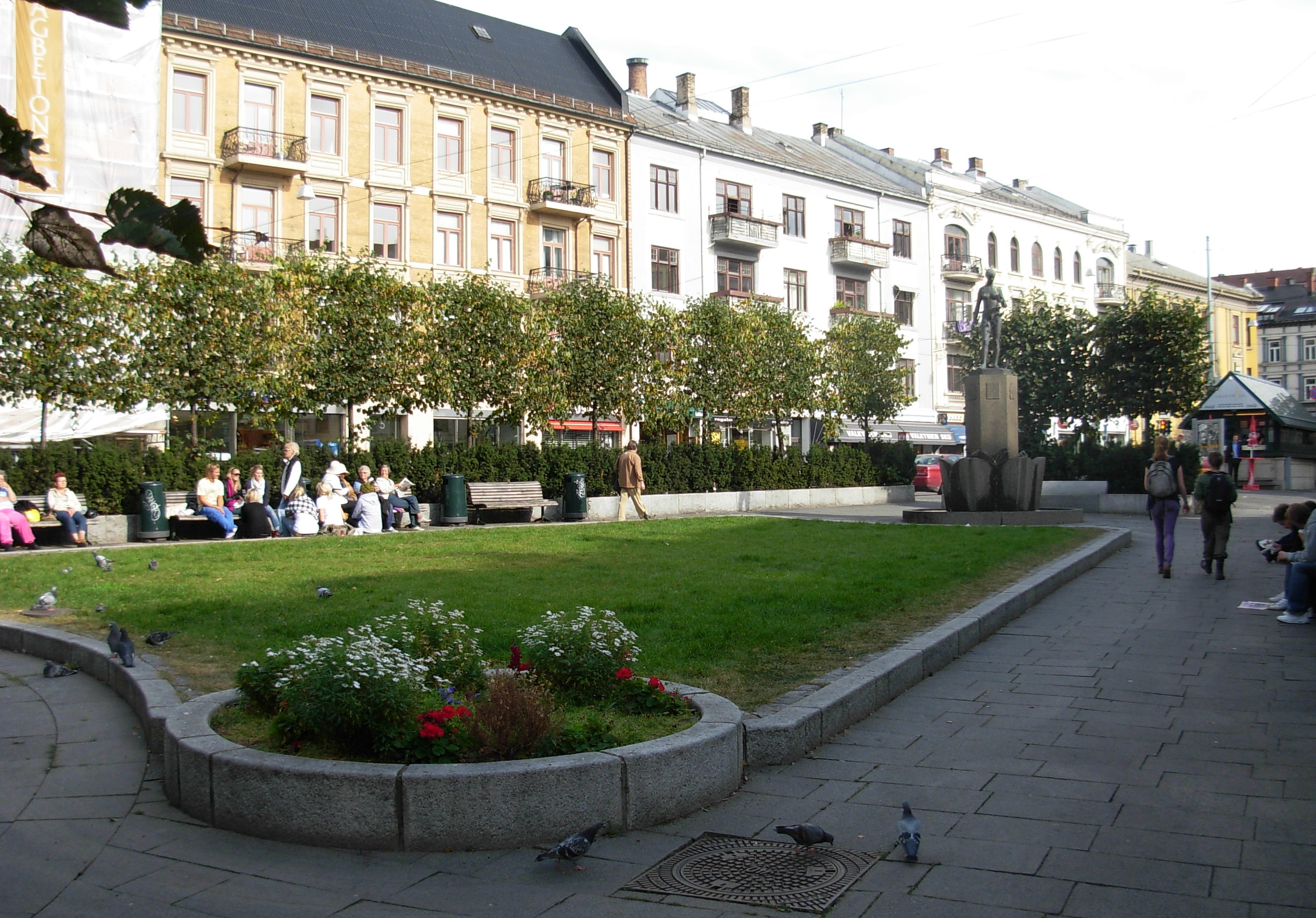
Valkyrie plass

Valkyrie plass is a square in Oslo, Norway, located one block southeast of Majorstuen.

The square is triangular in shape, and bounded by the streets Valkyriegata, Bogstadveien and Jacob Aall's gate. It is named after Norse female warrior deities called the valkyries.

The Common Tunnel of the Oslo T-bane system passes beneath Valkyrie plass, and there was a station beneath the square from 1912 to 1985. The station was built there due to a tunnel collapse when 800 cubic metres of rock fell into the tunnel under construction. On 7 January 1985 the station, which was very close to Majorstuen station was closed. The square is still served by the Oslo Tramway with two tram lines.
