= Valkyrien =

Norwegian television series

- Genre: Thriller; Medical drama; Crime drama
- Created by: Erik Richter Strand
- Written by: Erik Richter Strand; Thomas Seeberg Torjussen; Bjørn Ekeberg; Katherine Valen Zeiner
- Directed by: Erik Richter Strand
- Starring: Sven Nordin; Pål Sverre Hagen
- Composer: Marius Christiansen
- Country of origin: Norway
- Original language: Norwegian
- No. of series: 1
- No. of episodes: 8

Production
- Executive producer: Tone Rønning
- Producers: Nina B. Andersson; Eric Vogel; Ronnie Fridthjof
- Cinematography: Johan-Fredrik Bodtker
- Editors: Anders Bergland; Simen Gengenbach
- Camera setup: Multi-camera
- Running time: 45 minutes
- Production companies: Tordenfilm AS; Fridthjof Film
- Budget: NOK 65 million (USD 8.2 million; GBP 6.4 million)

Original release
- Network: NRK1
- Release: 1 January – 12 February 2017

Valkyrien (English: Valkyrie) is a 2017 Norwegian TV series first broadcast by NRK1. The series combines elements of the "Scandi noir" school of television with medical drama, crime drama and "a palpable sense of the paranoia induced by operating on the edges of society", drawing favorable comparisons with AMC's Breaking Bad.

The series is named for Valkyrien, closed metro station in Oslo.

== Premise ==
Surgeon Ravn Eikanger becomes furious when his supervisors do not allow him to test experimental medical procedures on his dying wife. In desperation, Eikander fakes her death as an apparent suicide and brings her to a makeshift clinic in the abandoned subway station Valkyrie. He is aided by Leif Lien, a paranoid prepper, who allows Ravn stay hidden if he operates an underground hospital where those who do not trust the Norwegian health care services can seek help.

== Cast and characters ==
- Sven Nordin as Ravn Eikanger – a brilliant surgeon who has become disillusioned and embittered after colleagues refused to allow his terminally ill wife to undergo an untested experimental treatment.
- Pål Sverre Hagen as Leif Lien – a "doomsday prepper" and a Chief Technical Officer with the Sivilforsvaret—Norway's civil defence agency—responsible for the security and maintenance of a network of Cold War-era bunkers beneath Oslo.
- Pia Halvorsen as Vilma Eikanger – Ravn's wife, a neuroimmunologist working to develop a bacteriophage for use as an antibiotic in humans.
- Ellen-Birgitte Winther as Unn Vikebø – a former colleague of Ravn and Vilma at the Oslo University Hospital.
- Mikkel Bratt Silset as Teodor "Teo" Naustvik – Leif's friend, wanted by the police for his part in a bungled bank robbery and on the run with NOK 62 million (EUR 6.7 million; USD 7.8 million; GBP 6 million).
- Gine Cornelia Pedersen as Marit Naustvik – Teo's pregnant wife.
- Laila Goody as Grethe – the head of Vilma's research team at Oslo University Hospital.
- Ameli Isungset Agbota as Siv – Vilma's daughter.
- Joachim Rafaelsen as Per Olav – a police officer determined to track down Teo.
- Svein Harry Schöttker Hauge as the prison guard.

== Episode list ==
| No. | Title | Directed by | Written by | Original release date |
|---|---|---|---|---|
| 1 | "Undergrunnen (The Underground)" | Erik Richter Strand | Erik Richter Strand, Thomas Torjussen | 1 January 2017 |
| 2 | "Styx" | Erik Richter Strand | Erik Richter Strand, Thomas Torjussen | 1 January 2017 |
| 3 | "Vinn Vinn (Win Win)" | Erik Richter Strand | Erik Richter Strand, Thomas Torjussen | 8 January 2017 |
| 4 | "Pro Bono Publico" | Erik Richter Strand | Erik Richter Strand, Bjørn Ekeberg | 15 January 2017 |
| 5 | "TEOTWAWKI" | Erik Richter Strand | Kathrine Valen Zeiner | 22 January 2017 |
| 6 | "Blindgjenger (UXO)" | Erik Richter Strand | Bjørn Ekeberg | 29 January 2017 |
| 7 | "Post Mortem" | Erik Richter Strand | Erik Richter Strand, Kathrine Valen Zeiner | 5 February 2017 |
| 8 | "SHTF" | Erik Richter Strand | Erik Richter Strand, Bjørn Ekeberg | 12 February 2017 |

== Remake ==
Mark Strong stars in a British remake of Valkyrien set in London named Temple which first aired on Sky One in the UK in September 2019 and was produced by Hera Pictures.
