= Valkyrie (New Zealand band) =

New Zealand rock/hip-hop band

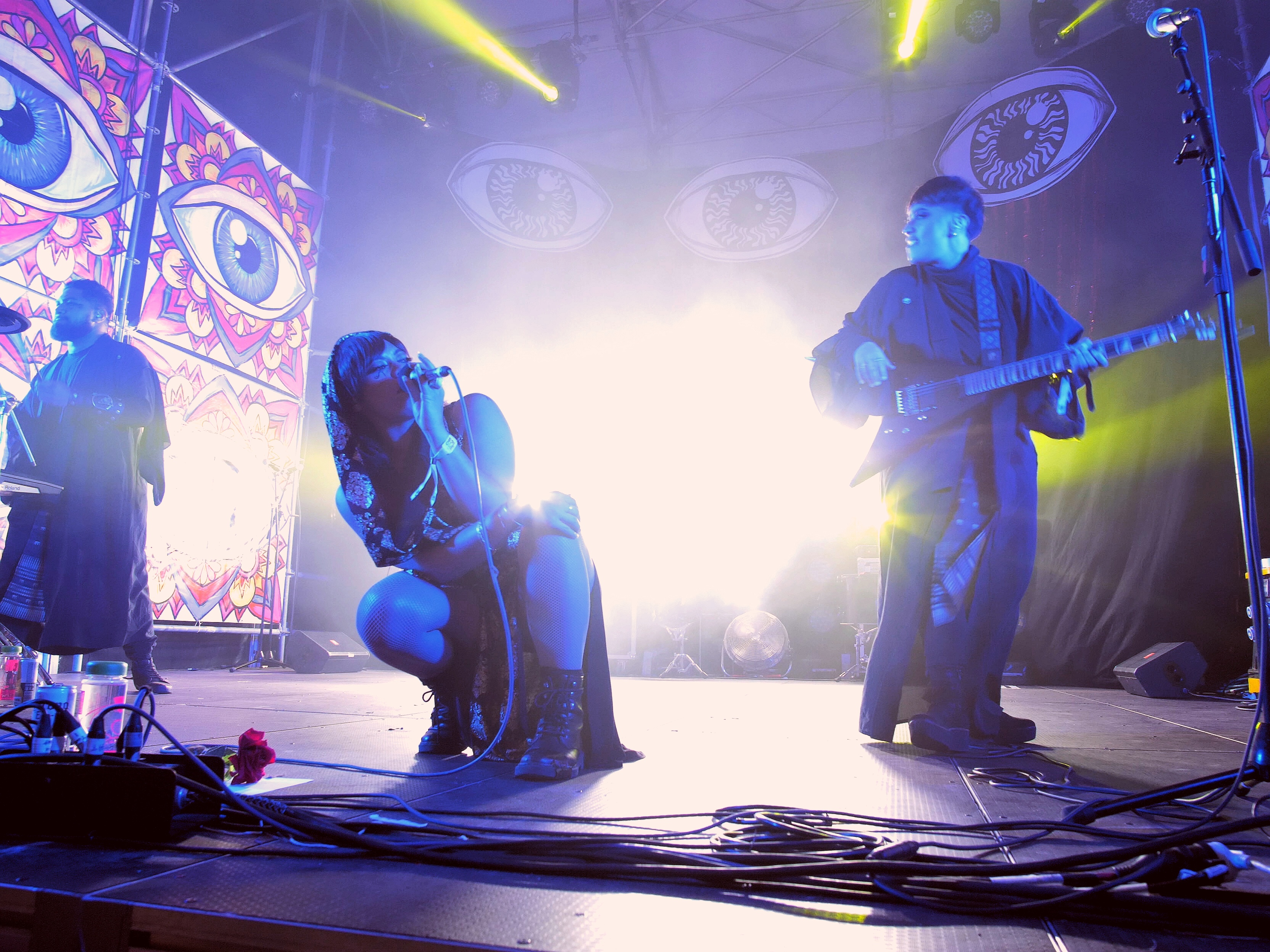
Valkyrie performing at Splore Festival, February 2018

Valkyrie (also Vallkyrie) is a New Zealand rock/hip-hop band based in South Auckland. In 2017 the band was nominated for Best Video by a Māori Artist at the Waiata Māori Music Awards.

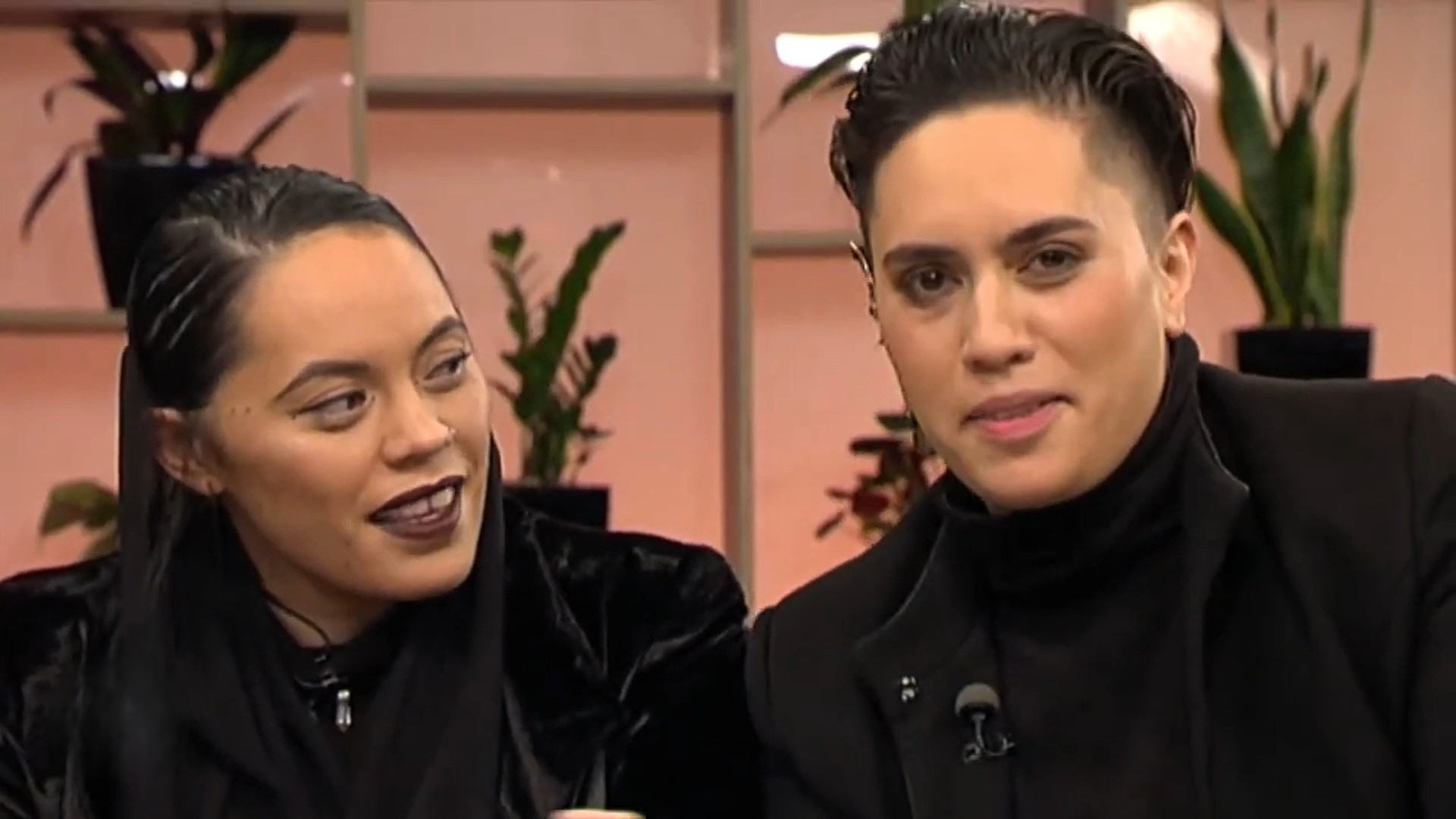
Left to right:Omer Gilroy, Rebel Reid in 2018

The band members are vocalist Omer Gilroy (Ngā Puhi, Ngāi Tahu), guitarist Rebel Reid (Nga Puhi) and drummer/keyboardist Brandon Haru (Nga Puhi, Tainui). Reid and Gilroy were childhood friends who attended Papatoetoe High School together and also studied together at the New Zealand Radio Training School at Whitireia New Zealand. In 2012 they started making music together, and were joined by Haru in 2015. The band members draw creative inspiration from their Māori cultural heritage, Norse mythology and gothic rock.
