= New Zealand Young Farmers =

Rural youth organisation in New Zealand

New Zealand Young Farmers (NZYF) is a national agricultural organisation with clubs throughout the country. It was formed in 1927 in the town of Feilding. The organisation acts as a social network for rural youth around the country and is actively involved in the education and promotion of personal skills for its members. There are over 1500 members in over 60 clubs around the country, all backed by the national organisation, which has its headquarters in Templeton, Canterbury. The organisation's current board chair is Chloe Belfield.

== History ==
The first Young Farmers clubs started in Feilding in 1927 and in Auckland in 1932, but much of the organisation's early growth came in the south. By the early 1930s there were eight clubs in the Otago region alone, and they formed New Zealand's first Young Farmers Federation. The federation rapidly expanded, containing 40 clubs by 1935, over half of them from Otago and with only two in the North Island.

In 1936 the young organisation moved its headquarters to the government's Department of Agriculture in Wellington and adopted a new constitution. This promoted the club's national nature, encouraging more growth in the North Island. By 1937 the federation included nearly 120 clubs, evenly distributed between the two islands. The organisation's membership dropped during World War II, but quickly recovered ground after 1945, rising to a peak of 306 clubs in 1948. A partner organisation, the Country Girls' Club, was also organised during the late 1940s. In 1972 the two organisations amalgamated to become the Federation of Rural Youth. The following year, a new constitution was accompanied by a change of name to the "New Zealand Federation of Young Farmers Clubs", a name it kept until 2003 when it became "New Zealand Young Farmers".

== FMG Young Farmer of the Year ==
NZYF runs the annual FMG Young Farmer of the Year event, sponsored by FMG Insurance. The contest began in 1969; the inaugural event was held in Auckland on 22 August that year. The contest was initially run by individual clubs, coming under the control of the national body in 2006.

=== How it works ===
Entry is free and open to all NZYF members. District contests are the first stage and are held throughout the country between October and December. The top contestants from each district contest progress through to the regional final which is held between February and April. The seven top regional finalists battle it out in the grand final for the title of FMG Young Farmer of the Year.

Each level of the competition includes question-and-answer sessions (on both farming-related and general knowledge subjects) and practical sessions involving farm work, problem solving, and business skills.

The grand final is a two-day event: the first day includes the practical challenges and the evening dinner where the contestants deliver their speech on a topic specific to each of them. The grand final concludes with a quiz show.

=== Winners ===
Winners since the competition began are:

- 1969 – Gary Frazer
- 1970 – Alan Anderson
- 1971 – Philip Bell
- 1972 – John Jennings
- 1973 – Nolan Williams
- 1974 – John Miller
- 1975 – Paul Jarman
- 1976 – John Metherell
- 1977 – Keith Holmes
- 1978 – Stephen Ryan
- 1979 – Hans Pendergrast
- 1980 – James Watt
- 1981 – Geoffrey Kane
- 1982 – Colin Brown
- 1983 – Gerard Lynch
- 1984 – Douglas Brown
- 1985 – Malcolm Dodson
- 1986 – Russell Whyte
- 1987 – Leo Vollebregt
- 1988 – Hugh Wigley
- 1989 – Sinclair Hughes
- 1990 – Kerry Dwyer
- 1991 – Tony Blunt
- 1992 – Grant Catto
- 1993 – Peter Barry
- 1994 – George Steven
- 1995 – Warwick Catto
- 1996 – Philip Reid
- 1997 – Shaun Baxter
- 1998 – Steve Hines
- 1999 – Richard Slee
- 2000 – Andrew Finch
- 2001 – Gene Roberts
- 2002 – Tim Porter
- 2003 – Robert Kempthorne
- 2004 – Simon Hopcroft
- 2005 – David Holdaway
- 2006 – John McCaw
- 2007 – Callum Thomsen
- 2008 – David Skiffington
- 2009 – Tim O'Sullivan
- 2010 – Grant McNaughton
- 2011 – Will Grayling
- 2012 – Michael Lilley
- 2013 – Tim van de Molen
- 2014 – David Kidd
- 2015 – Matt Bell
- 2016 – Athol New
- 2017 – Nigel Woodhead
- 2018 – Logan Wallace
- 2019 – James Robertson
- 2021 – Jake Jarman
- 2022 – Tim Dangen
- 2023 – Emma Poole
- 2024 – George Dodson
- 2025 – Hugh Jackson

== See also ==
- Agriculture in New Zealand
