= List of programmes broadcast by TVNZ =

This is an incomplete list of television programmes, past and present, screened on Television New Zealand that were made in New Zealand.

== Programmes ==
=== Regular shows (screened throughout the year) ===
| Show | Release date | Channel | Notes |
|---|---|---|---|
| 1News | 3 November 1969 | TVNZ 1 | News service, regular updates live from 6am weekdays; the main bulletin is at 6:00 pm everyday, with lunchtime and late night bulletins also broadcast on weekdays. |
| 20/20 | 2005 | TVNZ 2 (2005–2016); TVNZ 1 (2016-present) | Current affairs documentary show, hosted by Carolyn Robinson. Reporters are: Emma Keeling, Erin Conroy and Hannah Ockelford. |
| Breakfast | 1997 | TVNZ 1 | Morning talkshow. Currently hosted by Jenny-May Clarkson and Chris Chang. |
| Country Calendar | 6 March 1966 | TVNZ 1 | New Zealand farming show; the longest-running show on New Zealand television. Produced by Frank Torley. Some reporters include Vivienne Jeffs, Tony Benny and Jerome Cvitanovich. |
| Fair Go | 7 April 1977 | TVNZ 1 | Long running consumer watchdog show. Hosted by Haydn Jones and Pippa Wetzell. Current reporters are Hannah Wallis, Mark Crysell, Amy Kelley and Libby Middlebrook. |
| The Go Show | 31 October 2005 | TVNZ+ (formerly on TVNZ6, TV2 and KidZone) | Weekday toddler show. Similar to Hi-5. |
| Lotto | 1 August 1987 | TVNZ 2 (1987–2015) TVNZ 1 (2015–present) | Live Lotto New Zealand draw at 8:00 pm on Saturdays and 8:20pm on Wednesdays. |
| Marae | | TVNZ 1 | Māori affairs show. Presented By Shane Taurima. Political reports by Arana Taumata. |
| TVNZ Sport | | TVNZ 1 | Live sports coverage of sports shows screened on TVNZ 1 |
| Q+A | 2009 | TVNZ 1 | Presented by Jack Tame, who interviews politicians on current political issues. |
| Rural Delivery | | TVNZ 1 | Farming affairs show. Presented By Roger Bourne. |
| Seven Sharp | 2013 | TVNZ 1 | Weeknight current affairs and human interest show presented by Hilary Barry and Jeremy Wells. This show replaced the long running 7pm current affairs show Close Up and the show's predecessor Holmes. |
| Shortland Street | 25 May 1992 | TVNZ 2 | Long running New Zealand soap opera based at fictional hospital Shortland Street. |
| Sunday | 2002 | TVNZ 1 | Sunday evening current affairs show. Presented by Miriama Kamo. |
| Tagata Pasifika | | TVNZ 1 | Pacific Islander affairs show; hosted by Tom Natoealofa and Marama T-Pole; also screened on Māori Television |
| Te Karere | 1983? | TVNZ 1 | Māori language current affairs show hosted by Scotty Morrison. Former host: Tini Molyneux |
| Ten 7 Aotearoa | 2002 | TVNZ 2 | Reality police/criminal series hosted by Rob Lemoto and Sam Wallace; 29 seasons as of February 2023. |
| Waka Huia | 1987 | | Māori culture and current affairs |
| What Now? | 1981 | TVNZ 2 (1989–present); TVNZ 1 (1981–1989) | The longest-running children's show on New Zealand television; hosted by Erin Wells, Stella Maris and Joseph Coughlan |

=== Seasonal shows ===
| Show | Release date | Channel | Notes |
|---|---|---|---|
| The Bad Seed | 14 April 2019 | TVNZ 1 | Drama series, 5 episodes aired during the week beginning 14 April 2019. |
| Best Bits | 2014 | TVNZ 1 | Comedy shows that looks at the best TV clips from the past week. |
| Border Patrol | 2005 | TVNZ 1 | Reality show, narrated by Tim Balme. |
| Coast | 2018 | TVNZ 1 | Documentary series where the story of coastal locations around New Zealand is told. |
| Coastwatch | 2005 | TVNZ 1 | Similar to Border Patrol. Narrated by Jason Hoyte. |
| Descent From Disaster | 2019 | TVNZ 1 | Factual series, New Zealand celebrities tell the story of New Zealand's most famous disasters. |
| Dog Squad | | TVNZ 1 | Reality series which follows police dogs. |
| Dog Squad Puppy School | 2020 | TVNZ 1 | Spin off to Dog Squad series, this series focuses on the pups being trained for New Zealand's most elite organisations. |
| Eat Well For Less New Zealand | 2020 | TVNZ 1 | New Zealand version of British series Eat Well For Less. |
| Educators | 8 May 2019 | TVNZ+ | Comedy series. |
| First Dates New Zealand | 2020 | TVNZ 2 | Reality series based on the British series of First Dates. |
| Fresh Eggs | 2019 | TVNZ 2 | Comedy series |
| Goodnight Kiwi | 2019 | TVNZ+ | Various New Zealand celebrities read children's bed time stories, with the first episode featuring Prime Minister Jacinda Ardern. The title is a reference to the TVNZ closedown sequence used in the 1980s and 1990s featuring the Goodnight Kiwi or TV Kiwi as the character was known. |
| Go Girls | 2009 | TVNZ 2 | Drama series |
| Have You Been Paying Attention? | 2019 | TVNZ 2 | Celebrity quiz show where celebrity contestants are asked questions on news events and TV events that have occurred in the past week. |
| Highway Cops | 2012 | TVNZ 1 | Show that follows highway patrol police. |
| I Am | 2018 | TVNZ 1 | Factual Documentary series where a New Zealander tells his or her story. Each episode a New Zealander will tell a story about living with a certain health condition or surviving a certain event. |
| I Date Rejects | 2019 | TVNZ+ | Comedy Series |
| Last Chance Dogs | 2012 | TVNZ 2 | Show about dogs who are at risk of being confiscated from their owners. |
| Late Night Big Breakfast | 2014, 2020 | TVNZ 1, TVNZ Duke | Comedy parody show of a late night talk show. |
| Let's Get Inventin' | 2006 | TVNZ 2 | Children's invention show |
| Living with the Boss | 2020 | TVNZ 1 | Reality series where the CEO or owner of a New Zealand business lives with an employee for a week. |
| Motorway Patrol | 2001 | TVNZ 2 | Reality series following the New Zealand Police Highway Patrol in action showing footage of people being stopped for traffic offences or accidents on the Auckland motorways. |
| Mucking In | 2003 | TVNZ 1 | Lifestyle/makeover series hosted by presenter Jim Mora and gardener Tony Murrell. |
| My Kitchen Rules New Zealand | 2014 | TVNZ 1 | New Zealand version of My Kitchen Rules |
| Neighbours at War | 2006 | TVNZ 2 | Reality series |
| New Zealand Surf League | | | Sports show showcasing the New Zealand Ironman finals. Hosted by Cory Hutchings. |
| New Zealand's Got Talent | 8 September 2008 | TVNZ 1 | New Zealand version of the Got Talent series. Original season screened on Prime in 2008; series 2 began on TV One in 2012. |
| Piha Rescue | 2005 | TVNZ 1 | Reality show about lifeguards at Auckland's Piha Beach. Narrated By John Sumner. |
| Rapid Response | 2010 | TVNZ 1 | Reality show following the New Zealand ambulance service, |
| Renters | 2003, 2005 and 2011–present | TVNZ 2 | This reality show follows several rental property managers showing houses badly treated by tenants and dealing with tenants who are late in paying their rent. |
| Snack Masters | 2022 | TVNZ 2 | This reality cooking show, hosted by Kim Crossman and Tom Sainsbury, challenges chefs to replicate well-known snacks. |
| The Brokenwood Mysteries | 2014 | TVNZ 1, Prime | With the assistance of Detective Kristin Sims, Detective Inspector Mike Shepherd investigates a wide range of murder mysteries in Brokenwood, a small town in the countryside of New Zealand. |
| The Casketeers | 2018 | TVNZ 1 | Documentary and reality series that goes behind the scenes of a New Zealand funeral director Tipene Funerals. |
| The Great Kiwi Bake Off | 2019 | TVNZ 2 | Reality cooking/baking series. |
| The Year That Was | 2012 | TVNZ 2 | A standup comedian talks about a particular year to a live audience; the show features clips from that year. |
| This Is Your Life | 1984 | TVNZ 1 | New Zealand version of the show where the host surprises guests with a show documenting their lives, with audience participation from their friends and family. Usually screened once a year or every few years; in the early series the show screened more often. Originally presented by Bob Parker, later shows have been presented by Paul Holmes and for a few years Paul Henry. |
| This Town | 2013 | TVNZ 1 | Show that looks at small towns in Heartland New Zealand focusing mostly on the people that live in these towns. Each week it looks at small towns in a different area of New Zealand. |
| Treasure Island | 2000–2008, 2019 | TVNZ 2 | Reality television show; Survivor-like, only mainly with celebrities. |

=== One-off series ===
Shows that screened intentionally for just one season or for just a few weeks.

| Show | Release date | Channel | Notes |
|---|---|---|---|
| From the Archives | 1 June 2010 | TVNZ Heartland | A series looking back at television in New Zealand, presented by Andrew Shaw. Each show featured highlights or an entire show from a particular decade. The series is shown on TVNZ Heartland and was the very show to feature on the channel. Later episodes contained older shows with a theme such as gardening shows, cooking shows and an episode dedicated to Top Town. |
| Frontier of Dreams | 2005 | One | Series about the history of New Zealand. |
| Funny As: The Story of New Zealand Comedy | 2019 | TVNZ 1 | 5 part documentary series that looked at the past of New Zealand comedy. |
| Karaoke High | 2006 | TV2 | New Zealand drama show screened during the summertime as a replacement for Shortland Street. Featured New Zealand actress Miriama Smith. |
| North | 2011 | One | Presented by Marcus Lush, this successor to the series South looks at the northern part of New Zealand. |
| Off the Rails | 2005 | One | Presented by Marcus Lush, this series follows the New Zealand rail network from Bluff to the most Northern railway line in New Zealand visiting local people and attractions along the way. |
| Police College | 11 April 2006 | TV2 | Reality show following the recruits of the New Zealand Police |
| Scarfie Days | 2007 | TV2 | A look at the lives of students studying at the University of Otago. |
| Snotties | 2006 | TV2 | A look at aspiring naval officers. |
| South | 2009 | One | Presented by Marcus Lush, this series looks at the southernmost part of New Zealand. |
| The Eggplant | 2020 | TVNZ+ | A series designed to help young Kiwis navigate one of the greatest mysteries of the 21st century – the internet. |

=== Cancelled/ended programmes ===
| Show | Release date | Channel | Notes |
|---|---|---|---|
| 2 Tube | 2008 | TV2 | Show where viewers send in their own home movies. Similar to America's Funniest Home Videos. Hosted by Millen Baird. |
| 10 Years Younger | 2005–2009 | One | Hosted by Fiona MacDonald, the New Zealand version of the British show. |
| 10AM | 1990 | | Arts and lifestyle magazine programme |
| 14 Days on Trial | 1989/90 | | Documentary about New Zealand pioneers |
| 3.45 Live | 1989–1990 | TV2 | Older children's and teenagers' after-school show hosted by Ricky Morris and Fenella Bathfield in 1989 and Phil Keoghan and Hine Elder in 1990. |
| 5.30 with Jude | | One | Talk show hosted by Jude Dobson |
| 60 Minutes | 1993–2001 | TV2 moved to One | Current affairs show. Rights bought by TV3. |
| AA Torque Show | 2005 | One | Picked up by Prime in 2007 |
| The Adam and Eve Show | 2015–2017 | TV2 | Children's afternoon show hosted by Adam Percival and Eve Palmer aired 4.30 in 2015 and 2016 and 3.30 pm in 2017. Replaced 4.30 show and Erin Simpson Show. |
| After 2 | 1989–1991 | TV2 | Children's show aimed at preschoolers and younger school children; replaced the earlier part of After School while 3.45 Live replaced the later part. Hosted by Jason Gunn and Thingee. |
| After School | 1983–1988 | One from 1987, moved to TV2 | Children's after-school show originally hosted by Olly Ohlson and in 1988 Jason Gunn and Thingee. |
| Animal House | 9 March 2005 – 2011 | TVNZ 1 | Series highlighting the New Zealand Society for the Prevention of Cruelty to Animals. |
| The Apprentice New Zealand | 2010 | TV2 | New Zealand version of The Apprentice, hosted by Terry Serepisos |
| April's Angels | 1998 | TV2 | Hosted by April Ieremia; the team every week takes part in a community project. |
| Are You Smarter Than a 10 Year Old? | 2007 | TV2 | |
| Asia Down Under | 22 February 2001 | One | A magazine series reflecting the life, concerns and interests of the Asian community in New Zealand. Spin-off of Asia Dynamic. Presented By Melissa Lee. |
| Artsville | 2005–2011 | TVNZ 1 | Documentary arts series |
| Auction House | 30 April 2006 – ? | TVNZ 1 | Reality show about auctioneers and real estate. |
| Back Benches | 2008–2012 | TVNZ 7 | Political talk show. Ended when TVNZ 7 was closed down in 2012. Picked up by Prime in 2013. |
| The Billy T. James Show | 1983–1985 | | Comedy show starring Billy T. James. Show later screened on TV3 in 1990, a year before his death. |
| Blind Date | 1989–1991 | TV2 | Dating match show, hosted by Dave Jamieson and Suzy Aitken |
| Breakfast Business | 1997 | One | Weekday morning business show, hosted by Corin Dann. Reports from Owen Poland, Justine Turner, Michelle King, Lisa Davies and Pushpa Jabin. |
| The Bugs Bunny Show; The Cartoon Company | 1991–1994 | TV2 | Looney Tunes cartoon show hosted by Fenella Bathfield and then Fiona Anderson |
| Bumble | 1999–2002 | TV2 | Toddler show featuring Bumble the Bee and his friends, the show also aired in Australia. |
| Business Weekend | | One | Weekend version of the weekday morning show. Hosted by Corin Dann. |
| Carters DIY Dads | | | Reality show |
| Changing Rooms | 1998–2002 | One | New Zealand version of the TV show where two households redecorate each other's houses. Hosted by Kerry Smith and Andy Dye. |
| Chic Chat | | | Children's programme hosted by Chic Littlewood and Alma Woods. |
| Close to Home | 1975–1987 | One | New Zealand drama series |
| Close Up | 198? | One | Weekly current affairs show screened Thursday nights on TV1. This show has no connection to the show of the same name that screened weeknights on TV1 between 2004 and 2012. |
| Close Up | 2004–2012 | One | Weeknightly current affairs show hosted by Mark Sainsbury. Originally hosted by Susan Wood. |
| Compass | 1960s | AKTV2, WNTV1, CHTV3, DNTV2 | News and documentary style show. |
| Country GP | | | Period soap which succeeded Close to Home. |
| Crash Course | 2010 | TV2 | Road safety show presented by race car driver Greg Murphy |
| Crime Scene | 1997–1998 | TV2 | |
| Crimewatch | 1987–1996 | One | Show presented by the New Zealand Police, showing reconstructions, security footage and other details of recent unsolved crimes. Based on the British series of the same name. Superseded by Crime Scene and Ten 7 Aotearoa. |
| The Cult | 2009–2010 | TV2 | A serial drama television series in which a group of people try to rescue their loved ones from a mysterious cult called Two Gardens. Produced by Great Southern Television. |
| Dancing with the Stars | 2005–2009 | One | Reality television show where celebrities compete in a dance competition with a professional dancer as their partner. Hosted by Jason Gunn and Candy Lane. |
| Dig This | 1972–1986 | One | Gardening show hosted by Eion Scarrow. |
| DIY Rescue | 2001–2003 | TV2 | Reality show where the team come and fix DIY disasters or unfinished DIY work. Presented by Lisa Manning. |
| A Dog Show | 1980s | One | Rural New Zealand show where South Island farmers compete against North Island farmers to round up sheep with their dog only using a dog whistle. The winner received a trophy. Show presented by John Gordon. |
| Eating Media Lunch | 2003–2008 | TV2 | Hosted by Jeremy Wells |
| The Erin Simpson Show | 2009–2013 | TV2 | Daily teen affair/entertainment show, hosted by Erin Simpson. The show was produced in Christchurch by Whitebait Studios. |
| Eye to Eye with Willie Jackson | 2006 | One | Current affairs debate talk show, hosted by Willie Jackson |
| Face the Music | 1992–1994 | TV2 | Quiz show about music, hosted by Simon Barnett |
| Facelift | 2005–2007 | One | Comedy show that made fun of current events, politics and anything else on New Zealand television using characters dressed with sculpted faces to resemble various politicians and TV stars. |
| Filthy Rich | 2016 | TV2 | Drama series |
| Finding J. Smith | 2003 | TV2 | Game show where teams had to find a certain J. Smith (the most common name) in New Zealand. Had the largest game show prize in New Zealand, NZ$250,000, and was used to heavily promote the then new Vodafone Live! service. |
| FlipSide | 2002–2004 | TV2 | Youth news and entertainment talk show, hosted by Mike Puru. |
| Foreign Correspondent | 1980s – 1990s | One | Current affairs show featuring overseas stories presented by TVNZ foreign correspondents. |
| Free Time | 1983–1988 | One from 1987 moved to TV2 | School holiday replacement, screened in place of After School during school holidays. |
| Fresh and Fancy Fare; Country Fare | 1985–1986 | | Cooking series narrated by Gordon Jackson. |
| Friday Night | 1988 | | Friday night programme featuring overseas material (including Red Dwarf), live bands, comedy, a viewer participation game and information on upcoming events. Hosted by Alasdair Kincaid and others. |
| Frontline | 1988–1994 | One | News and current affairs show screened Sunday nights on TV1. |
| Frontseat | 2005–2009 | One | Arts show hosted by Oliver Driver |
| Fun Factory | 1979 | | Children's programme hosted by Mike Wilson. |
| Game of Two Halves | 2005–2008 | One | Sports quiz show hosted by Martin Devlin, with Matthew Ridge and Marc Ellis as team "captains". The show was previously hosted by Tony Veitch until he was suspended pending investigation after allegations of serious assault, which he confessed to on national TV. He later resigned from his positions at TVNZ. |
| Ghost Hunt | | | Reality show hunting famous New Zealand ghosts |
| Give It a Whirl | 2005–2006 | | Documentary music show. |
| Gliding On | 1980s | One | Adapted from Roger Hall's Glide Time play, a sitcom about workers in a government department. |
| Gloss | 1987–1990 | TV2, or TV One | Soap set in the world of fashion publishing, starring Ilona Rodgers. Also featured notable New Zealand actors Danielle Cormack and Geeling Ng. |
| Guess Who's Coming to Dinner? | 1998 | TV2 | Reality show hosted by Suzanne Paul |
| Havoc and Newsboy's Sellout Tour | 1998–2000 | TV2 | Presented by Mikey Havoc and Jeremy Wells; the show travelled around New Zealand with the presenters reviewing events and local places of interest in a humorous way. |
| Headliners | 2004–2005 | One | Entertainment news show hosted by Jason Reeves and Renee Wright. Cancelled at the end of 2005 for a ONE News revamp. |
| Heartland | 1993–1995 | One | Presented by Gary McCormick. Each week Gary followed the locals in a different community in New Zealand. |
| High Life | 1990–1995 | One | New Zealand version of the 1984-1994 television show Kids Incorporated. |
| Holmes | 1989–2004 | One | Moved to Prime Television New Zealand; current affairs show hosted by Paul Holmes |
| How Clean Is Your House? | 2005–2007 | One | Hosted by Carolyn Jones and Evon Blackwell-Chin. |
| Hudson and Halls | 1976–1985 | One | Cooking and entertainment show. |
| Hunter's Gold | 1977 | | Scott Hunter tries to track down his father in New Zealand's gold-prospecting country in 1860. |
| I Like That One Two | 1986 | 2 | Viewers' choice show, featuring clips from TV shows that viewers had requested by postal mail. A similar show was also screened in 1989 called Your Choice. |
| Insider's Guide To Love | 2004 | TV2 | Drama series |
| Internet Island | 2001 | TV2 | Reality show where a group of people were placed in a house and had to survive with nothing but an Internet connected computer. |
| Intrepid Journeys | 2001 | One | Reality/travel show where celebrities travel to foreign countries and do "as the Romans do" |
| Island Wars | 2009 | TV2 | Reality show where a group of people were placed on an island in a battle against New Zealanders and Aussies. |
| It's in the Bag | 1970s–1990 | One | Originally on radio and hosted by Selwyn Toogood, the show moved to TV during the 1970s and was hosted by John Hawkesby during the 1980s. |
| Jackson's Wharf | 1999–2000 | TV2 | Drama series set in the fictional town of Jackson's Wharf |
| Jandals Away | 11 March 2006 | | Sitcom, starring David Fane. Season 1 ended May 2006. Moved to the afternoon, and Season 2 began July 2006. Featured Dancing with the Stars singer Bella Kololo. |
| Jeopardy! | 1992–1993 | TV2 | Quiz show where contestants are given the answer and have to match the question; hosted by Mark Leishman |
| Just Kidding | 1995–1996 | TV2 | Hosted by Marcus Lush; a show similar to Candid Camera. |
| Kiwi Living | 2015–2016 | One | New Zealand lifestyle series |
| Kiwi Video Show | 1995–1998 | TV2 | The successor to New Zealand's Funniest Home Videos. |
| Kiwifruit | | | Gay magazine show starring Amanda Rees, Kevin Alexander and Matu Ngaporo; replacement of QueerNation |
| Krypton Factor | 1987–1991 | TV2 | Challenge between four contestants having to compete in mental agility, observation, physical ability, intelligence and general knowledge tests. Hosted by Dougal Stevenson. |
| Last Man Standing | 2005 | | Jointly made Australian–New Zealand drama series. Cancelled after one season. |
| Learner Drivers | 1998 | One | Reality show following the trials of people getting their driver's licenses. |
| Living the Dream | 2004 | | Licensed version of Joe Schmo. A reality TV show featuring several actors pretending to be contestants in a game show and one man who thinks it's all real. |
| M2 | 2001–2003 | TV2 | Music show that ran from midnight until 6 a.m. Fridays, Saturdays and Sundays; hosted by Dominic Bowden, Jacquie Brown and Joe Cotton. |
| Mai Time | 1996 | TV2 | |
| The Mainland Touch | 1983–1990 | One (Canterbury) | Regional news show screened exclusively in the upper South Island broadcast from TVNZ studios in Christchurch. Originally screened during a time period where each region screened a regional news show during the network news, later moved to before the network news. |
| Making Italy Home | 2005 | | Reality show about the Waters family, who relocate from Havelock North to Italy. |
| Marc & Matthew's Rocky Road | 2005–2006 | TV2 | Hosted by Marc Ellis and Matthew Ridge |
| Market Forces | | | Sequel to Gliding On; covered the change from government department to state-owned enterprise. |
| Marlin Bay | 1992 | TV2 | Drama series, starring Ilona Rodgers and Andy Anderson. |
| Masterchef New Zealand | 2010–2014 | One | Cooking competition show. Moved to TV3 in 2015. |
| MasterMind | 1980s, 2016 | TVNZ 1 | New Zealand version of British quiz show Mastermind. Originally screened in the 1980s and presented by Peter Sinclair the show was revived in 2016 now presented by Peter Williams |
| McDonald's Young Entertainers | | TV2 | Children's variety show hosted by Jason Gunn |
| McPhail and Gadsby | 1980s | One | Satirical sketch show, centring on politics, starring David McPhail and Jon Gadsby, and written by the pair with A. K. Grant. |
| Media 7 | 2008–2012 | TVNZ 7 | Weekly talk show screening on TVNZ 7, this show contains discussions with politicians and other media personalities from New Zealand. Moved to TV3 after TVNZ went off the air, rebranded as Media 3. |
| Meet the Locals | 2007–2012 | TVNZ 6 (2007–2011); TVNZ 7 (2011–2012) | |
| Mercy Peak | 2001–2004 | One | Drama series. Featured actress Sara Wiseman. |
| Mitre 10 DIY Rescue | 2001–2003 | TV2 | Reality show where the DIY Rescue team repair unfinished DIY work done to a home or DIY work that has gone wrong. |
| Mitre 10 Dream Home | 1999–2009; 2013 | TV2 | Reality show where two couples compete to build the house of their dreams with the winner taking away the house and the second place team given the option to buy the house. Hosted by Jayne Kiely until 2009 and Simon Barnett in 2013. |
| Mitre 10 Mega: The Fence | | TV2 | Reality show |
| The Mole | 2000 | TV2 | Reality show |
| Mortimer's Patch | 1980–1984 | | Police drama, starring Terence Cooper. |
| My House, My Castle | 1999–2011 | TV2 | Hosted by Robert Harte; lifestyle housing show |
| Nabbed | 2014 | TV2 | Reality series following NZ police. |
| New Zealand Idol | 2004–2006 | TV2 | Hosted by Dominic Bowden; New Zealand version of Pop Idol or American Idol |
| New Zealand's Funniest Home Videos | 1990–1995 | TV2 | Hosted by Ian Taylor (1990), Kerry Smith (1991–2), Jason Gunn (1993). Based on the format of America's Funniest Home Videos. |
| New Zealand's Worst Driver | 2005 | One | Based on the UK series; eight very bad drivers participate in various driving challenges with the most improved driver taking home a new car and the loser given the title of New Zealand's Worst Driver and having his vehicle crushed. Hosted by D'Arcy Waldegrave. |
| NewsNight | 1994 | TV2 | Late night news show on TV2, presented by Marcus Lush, targeted towards a younger audience. |
| Nothing Trivial | 2011–2014 | TVNZ 1 | Drama series |
| No Opportunity Wasted | 12 November 2006 | TV2 | Created by Phil Keoghan & Louise Keoghan; 26 contestants are given 72 hours, $3,000 and the opportunity to fulfill a long-held dream or desire. |
| NZ Story | 2013 | TVNZ 1 | Show where various New Zealanders tell their stories about a historic event in New Zealand. |
| On the Mat | | | Wrestling show |
| Open Home | 1992–1994 | One | Show that gave an open home tour of people's homes, usually luxury homes. The show usually featured a celebrity's home as well. |
| Our First Home | 2015-2016 | TVNZ 1 | Family-based home renovation show presented by Goran Paladin. |
| The OUTHouse | 2005 | | Magazine show aimed at gays and lesbians. Ran for a trial ten episodes as a possible QueerNation replacement. |
| Palmers Garden Show / Maggie's Garden Show | 1992–2003 | One | Gardening lifestyle show presented by Maggie Barry. Initially screened on Saturday mornings but later moved to Friday evenings. |
| Party Animals | 2003–2004 | TV2 | A children's show with bears for toddlers, the show also aired in Australia |
| Play Your Cards Right | | | New Zealand version of U.S. game show Card Sharks; hosted by Kenny Cantor |
| Popstars | 1999 | TV2 | Created TrueBliss. Only ran for one season but the format was taken overseas and many more manufactured groups were created around the world. Returning in 2021. |
| Praise Be | 1985–2016 | TVNZ 1 | Christian hymns show. Most recently hosted by Chris Nichol succeeding Graeme Thomson. |
| Press for Service | 1980s | | The A. K. Grant-created successor to Gliding On. Lasted one season. |
| The Price is Right | 1992 | TV3 | A short-lived New Zealand version of the famed, long-running U.S. game show of the same name; hosted by Dave Jamieson. |
| Pulp Comedy | | | Stand-up comedy show |
| Queer Nation | 1993–2005 | | Longest-running queer issues show in the world. |
| A Question of Sport | 1988–1991 | One | Sports quiz show where two teams of New Zealand sporting personalities competed against each other. The winning team each week had the choice of charity to donate prize money to. |
| Radio with Pictures | | TV2 | Late-night music programme. |
| Raise My Kids | 2005–2007 | One | Reality show seeing if couples who want children can raise someone else's children for a week. |
| Ready Steady Cook | 1999 | TV2 | Cooking show where two teams of celebrities compete to cook the best meal in a certain time. |
| Redemption Hill | 2006 | TV2 | Reality television show about delinquent children; Season 1 ended April 2006 |
| Ready to Roll; RTR Countdown; Video Hits | 1975–2006 | TV2 | Long running music show; ended 2006 |
| Risk | 2001 | One | Game show and Lottery show hosted by Matthew Ridge and Marc Ellis; replaced TeleBingo in 2001 |
| Roche | 1985 | | Dramas in a family-owned trucking firm. |
| Romper Room | 1977 | | Children's show which included Yvonne Moore as one of its hosts. |
| Rookie Vets | | | Reality show that follows students at Massey University who are aspiring to become veterinarians |
| Sale of the Century | 1989–1993 | One | Quiz show hosted by Steve Parr and Jude Dobson. |
| Sensing Murder | 2006–2010 | TV2 | Psychic crime investigations show hosted by Rebecca Gibney. Spans New Zealand and Australia. The psychics are Deb Webber, Sue Nicholson and Kelvin Cruickshank. |
| Seven Periods With Mr. Gormsby | 2005–2006 | One | Satirical comedy series |
| Shark in the Park | 1989–1990 | One | Action–drama series set in a Wellington police station, starring Jeffrey Thomas and Nathaniel Lees. |
| Shock Treatment | 2006–2008 | TV2 | Reality television show where celebrities are surprised and put through the wringer. |
| Showstoppers | | | Variety show |
| The Singing Bee | 2008–2009 | TV2 | New Zealand version of a show where the first few lines of a popular song is sung, then when the music stops the contestant must continue singing the lyrics. Hosted by Jordan Vandermade. The show was panned by the public. |
| So You Wanna Be a Popstar? | | TV2 | Celebrity music singing contest similar to New Zealand Idol |
| Son of a Gunn | 1992–1994 | TV2 | Children's show hosted by Jason Gunn and Thingee |
| Soup | 2002 | | Clay animation children's TV series |
| The South Tonight | 1983–1990 | One (Otago/Southland) | Regional news show screened exclusively in the Otago and Southland regions only, broadcast from TVNZ studios in Dunedin. Originally screened during a time period where each region screened a regional news show during the network news, later moved to before the network news. Presented by Hillary Muir-Clark. |
| SportsCafe | Original run 2003–2005 on TV2 and returned to air in 2008. | TV2 | Sports variety show; originally started on SKY Sport in 1995, moved to TV2 in 2003 and ended after the celebrity drug scandal of 2005. Returned to air in July 2008 for one season. |
| Spot On | 1970s – 1988 | One moved from 1987 to TV2 | Youth related news and entertainment show. |
| Squirt | 1999–2007 | TV2 | Saturday morning children's show; hosted by Ryan Inglis; former hosts include Dominic Bowdenl originally on TV3 |
| Step Dave | 2014–2015 | TVNZ 2 | Drama series about a 24-year-old man Dave dating a 39-year-old solo mother. |
| Street Legal | | TV2 | Law drama series starring Jay Laga'aia |
| Strip Search | | | Reality show fronted by ManPower Australia founder Billy Cross in finding a male revue show in New Zealand. Created KiwiFire. |
| Studio 2 LIVE | 22 March 2004 – 2010 | TV2 | Weekday children's show hosted by Matt Gibb, Dayna Vawdrey and Jordan Vandermade. |
| Taonga | 2006 | | Taonga is a New Zealand documentary series about New Zealand art and artists that debuted in 2006. |
| A Taste of New Zealand | | One | Cooking show hosted by Peta Mathias. |
| TeleBingo | 1996–2001 | One | Quiz and lottery show, rated well until 2001 when the show was shifted to a later time slot. Presented by Simon Barnett and Ingrid Mole. |
| The Zoo | 2005–2010 | TVNZ 1 | Reality show set in Auckland Zoo |
| To Catch a Thief | 2005 | TV2 | Two ex-thieves, Abraham Pehi and Veronica Jacomb, find a house that is an easy target for thieves and teach the occupants a lesson by organising to break into the house and take as many possessions as possible. They then help to fix the security flaws in the house. This series was rescreened in January 2008. |
| Today Tonight | 1983–1990 | One (Wellington) | Regional news show screened exclusively in the lower North Island (and originally the Upper South Island), broadcast from TVNZ studios in Wellington. Originally screened during a time period where each region screened a regional news show during the network news, later moved to before the network news. |
| Top Half | 1983–1990 | One (Auckland) | Regional news show screened exclusively in the upper North Island broadcast from TVNZ studios in Auckland. Originally screened during a time period where each region screened a regional news show during the network news, later moved to before the network news. Presented by Judy Bailey and John Hawkesby. |
| Top of the Class | 30 April 2006 | | Reality show putting famous New Zealanders back into school with a younger "clone" version of themselves. |
| Top of the Pops | 2004–2006 | TV2 | Live music show hosted by Bede Skinner; ended in 2006 after 3 seasons. Picked up by C4 in May 2006. |
| Top Town | 1976–1990 and returned in 2009 | TV2 | Show where locals from towns around New Zealand competed in various challenges against locals from other towns. The 2009 version was hosted by Marc Ellis and Hayley Holt. |
| Town and Around | 1960s | AKTV2, WNTV1, CHTV3, DNTV2 | Magazine style show; presenters traveled around towns in New Zealand interviewing the locals and talking about issues in the region. As this show featured before TVNZ programming was networked, each area of the country had its own local version. |
| Trading Places | 1998–1999 | TV2 | Reality show where two contestants must swap occupations for a day. |
| Treasure Hunt | 1990 | TV2 | Hosted by Nick Tansleyl contestants in a studio had to guide Nick (who travelled between locations in a helicopter) to the hidden treasure using clues given before a certain time. |
| TVNZ News at 8 | 2008 | TVNZ 7 | One hour news bulletin screened at 8pm. |
| TVNZ News Now | 2008 | TVNZ 7 | 5 minute news bulletin screened on the hour each hour. |
| Two on One | 1980–1982 | One | Variety show, starring Ray Woolf. |
| U Late | 2013 | TVNZ U | Late night version of U Live, this version featured less music and more talk. |
| U Live | 2011–2013 | TVNZ U | Daily presenter based entertainment show featuring movie and music reviews and interviews. Ended when TVNZ U went off the air on 31 August 2013. |
| Unauthorised History of New Zealand | 2005–2008 | One | Hosted by Jeremy Wells |
| Under the Mountain | 1981 | TV2 | The mini-series based on a novel by Maurice Gee. It was seen in the United States on The Third Eye on Nickelodeon. |
| University Challenge | 1976–1989 | One | Quiz show between teams of students representing universities around New Zealand |
| W3 | 1980s | One | Children's quiz show hosted by Selwyn Toogood and Lockwood Smith. |
| Weddings | 1995–2000 | TV2 | Presented by Jayne Kieley, this reality series followed a couple's wedding and preparation for the wedding. |
| A Week of It | 1970s | | Satirical sketch show. |
| Wheel of Fortune | Original run 1991–1996 and returned 2008–2009 | TV2, moved to One | Originally hosted in the 1990s by Phillip Leishman and with Lana Coc-kroft as the token blonde who turned around the letters. This show returned to New Zealand television in 2008 now hosted by Jason Gunn and Sonia Gray. Gray was temporarily replaced by Greer Robson when she went on maternity leave. However, in an unexpected move, the series was cancelled on 2 May 2009 due to local production budget cuts and the global recession. |
| XSTV | 2004–2009 | TV2 | Series highlighting the world of skateboarding, BMX racing and other extreme sports. |
| Your Choice | 1989 | TV2 | Viewers' choice show, featuring clips from TV shows that viewers had requested by postal mail. A similar show was screened in 1986 called I Like That One Two. |

=== Specials ===
- The TV2's 2003, a television special documenting a short film competition
