= List of New Zealand television series =

This is a list of New Zealand television series. Shows included feature from TVNZ, Sky Free, Whakaata Māori (Māori Television), Sky Open (formerly Prime), Sky, PBS, and CTV.

== Current shows ==
=== Drama ===
- The Brokenwood Mysteries (2014–present)
- The Cul de Sac (2016–present)
- Dark City: The Cleaner (2024-present)
- Dear Murderer (2017–present)
- The Market (2005–present)

=== Sports ===
- CRC Motorsport
- The Crowd Goes Wild (2006–present)
- Fishing & Adventure (2013–present)

=== Religious ===
- NZ Destiny Church
- NZONE Focus
- Praise Be

=== Soap opera ===
- Shortland Street (1992–present)

=== Lifestyle and documentary ===
- Country Calendar (1966–present)
- Intrepid Journeys (2003–present)
- Motorway Patrol (1999–present)
- Reunited (New Zealand TV series) (2022–present)
- Sensing Murder (2006–present)

=== Children's ===
- The Adventures of Tumeke Space (2021–present)
- The Barefoot Bandits (2016–present)
- Brain Busters (2020–present)
- Bumble (2020–present)
- Darwin & Newts (2018–present)
- The Drawing Show (2019–present)
- Extreme Cake Sports (2021–present)
- The Exceptional Squad (2020–present)
- Jandal Burn (2019–present)
- Kai Five (2018–present)
- Kiddets (2018–present)
- Kiri and Lou (2019–present)
- The Kids of Korero Lane (2023–present)
- My Favourite Dead Person (2022–present)
- Night Eyes (2023–present)
- Quimbo's Quest (2019–present)
- Takaro Tribe (2017–present)
- Tales of Nai Nai (2019–present)
- Toi Time! (2022–present)
- The Vloggingtons (2018–present)
- What Now (1981–present)
- Young Riders (2019–present)

=== Reality ===
- The Bachelor NZ (2015–present)
- Dancing with the Stars (2005–2009, 2015, 2018–present)
- Haka Life (2017-present)
- My Kitchen Rules NZ (2014, 2017–present)

=== Comedy ===
- 7 Days (2009–present)
- Guy Montgomery's Guy Mont-Spelling Bee (2023-present)
- Kid Sister (2022-present)
- Mean Mums (2019–present)
- Taskmaster NZ (2020–present)

=== News ===
- 20/20
- 60 Minutes (New Zealand TV programme) (1990-present)
- A Current Affair (2021–present)
- Marae (1992-present)
- PRIME News: First at 5:30 (2004–present)
- Q+A (2009–present)
- Seven Sharp (2013–present)
- Sunday (2002–present)
- Tagata Pasifika (1987-present)
- Te Karere (1982–present)

== Past shows ==
=== Drama ===
- 800 Words (2016–2018)
- The Almighty Johnsons (2011–2013)
- AFK (2015–2018)
- The Blue Rose (2013)
- Burying Brian (2008)
- City Life (1996–1998)
- Close to Home (1975–1983)
- A Country GP (1984–1985)
- Cover Story (1994–1996)
- The Cult (2009)
- Dirty Laundry (2016)
- Doves of War (2006)
- Duggan (1997–1999)
- Filthy Rich (2016–2017)
- Gloss (1987–1990)
- Go Girls (2009–2013)
- The Gulf (2019–2021)
- The Insider's Guide To Happiness (2005)
- The Insider's Guide To Love (2006)
- Interrogation (2005)
- Jackson's Wharf (1999–2001)
- Marlin Bay (1991–1994)
- Mataku (2002-2005)
- Mercy Peak (2001–2003)
- Mortimer's Patch (1980–1984)
- Nothing Trivial (2011–2015)
- Orange Roughies (2006–2007)
- Outrageous Fortune (2005–2010)
- The Panthers (2021)
- Pukemanu (1971)
- Rude Awakenings (2007)
- Shark in the Park (1989–1992)
- Step Dave (2013–2015)
- Street Legal (2000–2003)
- The Strip (2002–2003)
- Tales of the South Seas (1997)
- This Is Not My Life (2010)
- Westside (2015–2020)

=== Sports ===
- Big Angry Fish (2012–2019)
- The ITM Fishing Show (2004-2016)

=== Comedy ===
- Agent Anna (2013–2014)
- Bro'Town (2004–2009)
- Diplomatic Immunity (2009)
- Funny Girls (2015–2018)
- Girl vs. Boy (2012–2014)
- Gliding On (1981–1985)
- Golden Boy (2019–2020)
- Hounds (2012)
- The Jaquie Brown Diaries (2008–2009)
- Jono and Ben (2012–2018)
- The Jono Project (2010–2012)
- Melody Rules (1993–1995)
- Pulp Sport (2003–2009)
- The Ring Inz (2017-2019)
- Seven Periods with Mr Gormsby (2005–2006)
- Short Poppies (2014)
- Super City (2011–2012)
- Wanna-Ben (2010–2011)
- Willy Nilly (2003)

=== Lifestyle and documentary ===
- Brunch (2012)
- Dark Tourist (2018)
- Epitaph (2001)
- Fair Go (1977–2024)
- Ghost Hunt (2005–2006)
- Holmes (1989–2004)
- Home Front (2000-2005)
- Mitre 10 Changing Rooms
- Mitre 10 D.I.Y. Rescue
- Mitre 10 Dream Home (1999–2009)
- SCU: Serious Crash Unit (2004–2015)
- Target (New Zealand TV series) (1999-2012)
- Ten 7 Aotearoa (2002–2023)

=== Game shows ===
- Blind Date (1989—1990)
- Captive (2004)
- Deal or No Deal (2007–2008)
- It's in the Bag
- Sale of the Century (1989—1995)
- The Weakest Link (2001–2002)
- Wheel of Fortune (1991–2009)
- Who Wants to Be a Millionaire

=== Reality ===
- 100 Hours (2002)
- The Apprentice New Zealand (2010)
- The Block NZ (2012–2022)
- Flatmates (1997)
- Going Straight (2003)
- Henderson to Hollywood (2007)
- MasterChef New Zealand (2010–2014)
- New Zealand Idol (2004-2006)
- New Zealand's Next Top Model (2009-2011)
- So You Think You Can Dance (New Zealand) (2006)
- Survivor NZ (2017–2018)
- The X Factor (2013, 2015)

=== Children's ===
- Amazing Extraordinary Friends (2006–2008)
- Being Eve (2001–2002)
- Bumble (1999–2002) (expected to be brought back in YouTube revival series in late 2020)
- Children of the Dog Star (1984)
- Children of Fire Mountain (1979)
- Fanimals (2018–2019)
- Jane and the Dragon (New Zealand and Canadian co-production) (2005-2006)
- The Kids from OWL (1980s)
- The Killian Curse (2006)
- Maddigan's Quest (2006)
- Mirror, Mirror (New Zealand and Australian co-production) (1995)
- The Son of a Gunn Show (1992–1995)
- Sticky TV (2002–2017)
- Studio 2 LIVE (2004–2010)
- Terry and the Gunrunners (1985)
- The Feed (2022–2023)
- The Tribe (1998–2003)
- Under the Mountain (1981) - miniseries

=== News ===
- The Project (2017–2023)
