= 1992 in New Zealand television =

This is a list of New Zealand television events and premieres that occurred in 1992, the 33rd year of continuous operation of television in New Zealand.

== Events ==
- January - March – Channel 2 ran 24 hours a day, seven days a week. It returned to a nightly closedown in the first week of April.
- 8 January – Australian television series for children and preschoolers Johnson and Friends aired on Channel 2 for the very last time and would return to air on New Zealand television in 1996 with TV One picking up the series. As of that day, only the first series was shown on Channel 2.
- 11 February – TV3 debuted American sitcom based on the stand-up comedy of comedian and actor Tim Allen Home Improvement.
- 23 March – After two years of airing on TV3, the British children's television series Thomas the Tank Engine & Friends returned to screen on TVNZ with Channel 2 airing the series as part of the Jase TV block.
- 25 May – New Zealand medical soap opera Shortland Street debuted on Channel 2, and later became the country's longest running soap still in production.
- 11 June – New Zealand soap opera Homeward Bound debuted on TV3 and ran for 22 episodes.
- July – Television hours were reduced due to the power crisis.
- 6 July – Fifty Forward an exercise program debuts on TV1.
- 6 July – A New Zealand show for preschoolers under 5 You and Me, starring Pauline Cooper as host, began on TV3.
- 10 August – Channel 2 picked up Shining Time Station, the American spinoff series of Thomas the Tank Engine & Friends.
- 20 August – New Zealand drama series Marlin Bay premiered on Channel 2.
- 29 August – Television broadcasts to Christchurch are interrupted for approximately 19 hours after the backup generator at the Sugarloaf transmitter runs out of diesel, following the Canterbury "Big Snow" of 27–28 August which cut mains power and blocked road access to the transmitter.
- 10 October – Wheel of Fortune ran a celebrity episode on Channel 2 featuring David Tua, said "O for Awesome".

== Debuts ==
=== Domestic ===
- 3 February – Jase TV (Channel 2) (1992)
- 3 February – 3pm (TV3) (1992)
- 3 February – The Son of a Gunn Show (Channel 2) (1992–1995)
- 25 May – Shortland Street (Channel 2) (1992–present)
- 11 June – Homeward Bound (TV3) (1992)
- 22 June – Jeopardy! (TV One) (1992–1993)
- 6 July – You and Me (TV3) (1992–1998)
- 20 August – Marlin Bay (1992–1994)
- Face the Music (Channel 2) (1992–1994)

=== International ===
- 2 January – (United Kingdom) Spider! (Channel 2)
- 5 January – (Australia) Come In Spinner (TV One)
- 5 January – (United Kingdom) The Magnum Story (TV One)
- 9 January – (United States) Stuck with Each Other (TV One)
- 9 January – (United Kingdom) Brum (Channel 2)
- 18 January – (United States) James Brown: Living in America (Channel 2)
- 18 January – (Canada) The Railway Dragon (Channel 2)
- 18 January – (United States) Delancey Street: The Crisis Within (Channel 2)
- 3 February – (United States) American Detective (Channel 2)
- 3 February – (United Kingdom) Fiddley Foodle Bird (Channel 2)
- 3 February – (United Kingdom) Stay Lucky (TV One)
- 4 February – (United Kingdom) Short, Sharp and Shocking (TV One)
- 6 February – (Australia) Dinky Di's (Channel 2)
- 8 February – (United States) The Pirates of Dark Water (Channel 2)
- 8 February – (United States) Toxic Crusaders (Channel 2)
- 8 February – (United States) Mr. Bogus (Channel 2)
- 8 February – (United States) Hammerman (Channel 2)
- 9 February – (Canada) The Girl From Mars (Channel 2)
- 9 February – (United Kingdom) / (United States) Captain Zed and the Zee Zone (Channel 2)
- 9 February – (United Kingdom) The Winjin' Pom (Channel 2)
- 11 February – (United States) Home Improvement (TV3)
- 11 February – (United States) Good & Evil (TV3)
- 22 February – (Australia) Burke's Backyard (TV One)
- 7 March – (United Kingdom) / (United States) Potsworth & Co (Channel 2)
- 8 March – (Canada) Lost in the Barrens (Channel 2)
- 13 March – (United States) James Bond Jr. (Channel 2)
- 13 March – (Canada) / (France) C.L.Y.D.E. (Channel 2)
- 22 March – (Australia) Elly & Jools (Channel 2)
- 29 March – (Canada) / (United States) To Catch a Killer (Channel 2)
- 1 April – (United States) Felix the Cat (1990s) (Channel 2)
- 2 April – (United Kingdom) Bottom (Channel 2)
- 4 April – (United Kingdom) The Shape of the World (TV One)
- 5 April – (Australia) Frozen Assets (TV3)
- 5 April – (United States) The Adventures of Super Mario Bros. 3 (Channel 2)
- 5 April – (United States) Space Cats (Channel 2)
- 5 April – (United States) You Can't Grow Again (Channel 2)
- 5 April – (Canada) Curse of the Viking Grave (Channel 2)
- 5 April – (United Kingdom) The Dreamstone (Channel 2)
- 6 April – (Wales) Joshua Jones (Channel 2)
- 2 May – (United Kingdom) The Darling Buds of May (TV One)
- 14 May – (United Kingdom) A Tale of Two Cities (1989) (TV One)
- 24 May – (United States) In a Child's Name (Channel 2)
- 24 May – (France) / (Canada) / (United States) Madeline Specials (Channel 2)
- 31 May – (United States) / (France) / (Japan) Diplodos (Channel 2)
- 5 June – (United States) Once Again (TV One)
- 6 June – (United States) Tom & Jerry Kids (Channel 2)
- 6 June – (United States) Stephen King's World of Horror (TV3)
- 6 June – (Australia) New Faces (TV3)
- 8 June – (United Kingdom) The Missionaries (TV One)
- 10 June – (United States) The Josephine Baker Story (TV3)
- 11 June – (United States) Lonesome Dove (TV One)
- 14 June – (United Kingdom) The Men's Room (TV One)
- 21 June – (Australia) The Worst Day of My Life (Channel 2)
- 21 June – (Australia) The Girl from Tomorrow (Channel 2)
- 24 June - (United States) It (Channel 2)
- 26 June – (Japan) Three Little Ghosts (Channel 2)
- 7 July – (United States) Lightning Force (Channel 2)
- 14 July – (Australia) Cop It Sweet (TV3)
- 2 August – (United Kingdom) Dodgem (Channel 2)
- 2 August – (United States) The New Lassie (Channel 2)
- 4 August – (United States) Nurses (TV3)
- 8 August – (United States) / (United Kingdom) Where's Wally? (Channel 2)
- 10 August – (United Kingdom) Playdays (Channel 2)
- 10 August – (United States) Shining Time Station (Channel 2)
- 11 August – (Australia) Phoenix (TV One)
- 14 August – (United Kingdom) The Cloning of Joanna May (TV One)
- 23 August – (United States) Intruders (Channel 2)
- 28 September – (United Kingdom) Noddy's Toyland Adventures (Channel 2)
- 3 October – (United States) Harry and the Hendersons (Channel 2)
- 4 October – (United States) Super Mario World (Channel 2)
- 5 October – (United States) Lamb Chop's Play-Along (Channel 2)
- 11 October – (Australia) Koorana-Crocodile's New Beginning (TV3)
- 11 October – (United Kingdom) Diana: A Portrait (TV One)
- 11 October – (United Kingdom) Clarissa (TV One)
- 12 October – (United States) Eddie Dodd (Channel 2)
- 13 October – (Japan) Jungle Tales (Channel 2)
- 22 October – (United States) When Will I Be Loved? (TV3)
- 1 November – (United States) Voices Within: The Lives of Truddi Chase (TV3)
- 1 November – (United States) This is Garth Brooks (TV3)
- 2 November – (United States) Shattered Dreams (Channel 2)
- 3 November – (United States) Swans Crossing (Channel 2)
- 10 November – (United States) Bodies of Evidence (Channel 2)
- 10 November – (Germany) / (United States) A Father's Revenge (Channel 2)
- 25 December – (United Kingdom) Father Christmas (Channel 2)
- 25 December – (United Kingdom) Santa's First Christmas (Channel 2)
- (United States) Top of the Heap (Channel 2)
- (United States) Dinosaurs (TV3)
- (United States) Video Power (Channel 2)
- (United States) TaleSpin (TV3)
- (United Kingdom) Just So Stories (Channel 2)
- (United States) Doug (Channel 2)
- (United States) The Adventures of Mark and Brian (TV3)
- (United States) Kidd Video (TV3)
- (France) Zoo Olympics (Channel 2)
- (United Kingdom) Truckers (Channel 2)
- (United States) Wish Kid (Channel 2)
- (Canada) / (France) / (United Kingdom) Rupert (Channel 2)
- (Japan) / (United States) The Transformers (TV3)
- (Japan) Funky Fables (Channel 2)
- (United States) / (South Korea) Widget (TV3)
- (United States) The Ren and Stimpy Show (Channel 2)
- (Japan) Bob in a Bottle (Channel 2)
- (United Kingdom) King Rollo (Channel 2)
- (United Kingdom) The Brittas Empire (TV One)
- (United States) We All Have Tales (Channel 2)
- (France) / (United States) Bucky O'Hare and the Toad Wars! (Channel 2)
- (United Kingdom) Topsy and Tim (Channel 2)
- (United States) Lazer Tag Academy (Channel 2)
- (United States) Camp Candy (TV3)
- (United States) Yo Yogi! (Channel 2)

== Changes to network affiliation ==
This is a list of programs which made their premiere on a New Zealand television network that had previously premiered on another New Zealand television network. The networks involved in the switch of allegiances are predominantly both free-to-air networks or both subscription television networks. Programs that have their free-to-air/subscription television premiere, after previously premiering on the opposite platform (free-to air to subscription/subscription to free-to air) are not included. In some cases, programs may still air on the original television network. This occurs predominantly with programs shared between subscription television networks.

=== International ===
Program	New network(s)	Previous network(s)	Date
(United Kingdom) The Adventures of Spot	Channel 2	TV One	2 January
(Australia) Arthur! and the Square Knights of the Round Table	Channel 2	NZBC	6 January
(United Kingdom) Towser	Channel 2	TV One	7 January
(United Kingdom) Thomas the Tank Engine & Friends	Channel 2	TV3	23 March
(Wales) SuperTed	Channel 2	TV One	3 April
(Japan) Speed Racer	TV3	NZBC	1992
(Australia) E Street	Channel 2	TV3	1 May
(United Kingdom) Victor and Maria	Channel 2	TV One	1992
(United States) The Bold and the Beautiful	Channel 2	TV3	31 August
(Australia) Home and Away	TV One	TV3	14 September

== Subscription television ==
=== International ===
Program	Channel	Debut date
(United States) / (Canada) / (France) Young Robin Hood	Sky Movies	1992
(France) / (United States) The Get Along Gang	Sky Movies	1992
(United States) Lady Lovely Locks	Sky Movies	1992

=== Subscription premieres ===
This is a list of programs which made their premiere on New Zealand subscription television that had previously premiered on New Zealand free-to-air television. Programs may still air on the original free-to-air television network.

==== International ====
Program	Subscription network	Free-to-air network	Date
(United States) The Good, the Bad, and Huckleberry Hound	Sky Movies	Channel 2	31 March
(United States) Yogi and the Invasion of the Space Bears	Sky Movies	TV One	20 May
(United States) Richie Rich	Sky Movies	TV One, Channel 2	1992
(United States) CB Bears	Sky Movies	TV One	1992
(United States) Heyyy, It's the King!	Sky Movies	TV One	1992

== Television shows ==
- What Now (1981–present)
- The Early Bird Show (1989–1992)
- New Zealand's Funniest Home Videos (1990–1993)
- 60 Minutes (1990–present)
- Wheel of Fortune (1991–1996)
- The Ralston Group (1991–1994)
- Marlin Bay (1992–1994)
- Shortland Street (1992–present)
- You and Me (1992–1998)

== Ending this year ==
- 29 October – Homeward Bound (TV3 (1992)
- The Early Bird Show (TV3) (1989–1992)
- A Dog's Show (TV One) (1977–1992)
- Shark in the Park (TV One) (1989–1992)
- Jase TV (Channel 2) (1992)
