= Implosion of Radio Network House =

Building demolition in New Zealand

Coordinates: 43.5306°S 172.6410°E

Radio Network House was imploded on 5 August 2012

The implosion of Radio Network House in 2012 was the first implosion used in New Zealand to demolish a building, and was a "test case" for the potential to use such a demolition method on similar buildings in Christchurch Central City that had been damaged in the 2011 earthquake. Like most other large buildings in central Christchurch, Radio Network House was damaged beyond repair in the 2011 earthquake, and the Canterbury Earthquake Recovery Authority (CERA) added it to the demolition list in August 2011. In July 2012, it was announced that the building was going to be imploded, involving a specialist company from the United States with considerable experience in this type of work.

The right to push the button for the implosion was put up for auction on Trade Me, and became that website's third most viewed auction. The winning bid of NZ$26,000 was made by a consortium of demolition contractors, who allowed the Child Cancer Foundation to nominate a six-year-old boy from Queenstown to trigger the event. The implosion, which was carefully monitored to assess the suitability of this demolition method for potential future applications, went without any problems and it is anticipated that this will have paved the way for many more implosions in New Zealand in general, and in Christchurch in particular. However, as of 2026, only one further implosion has been carried out.

== Background ==
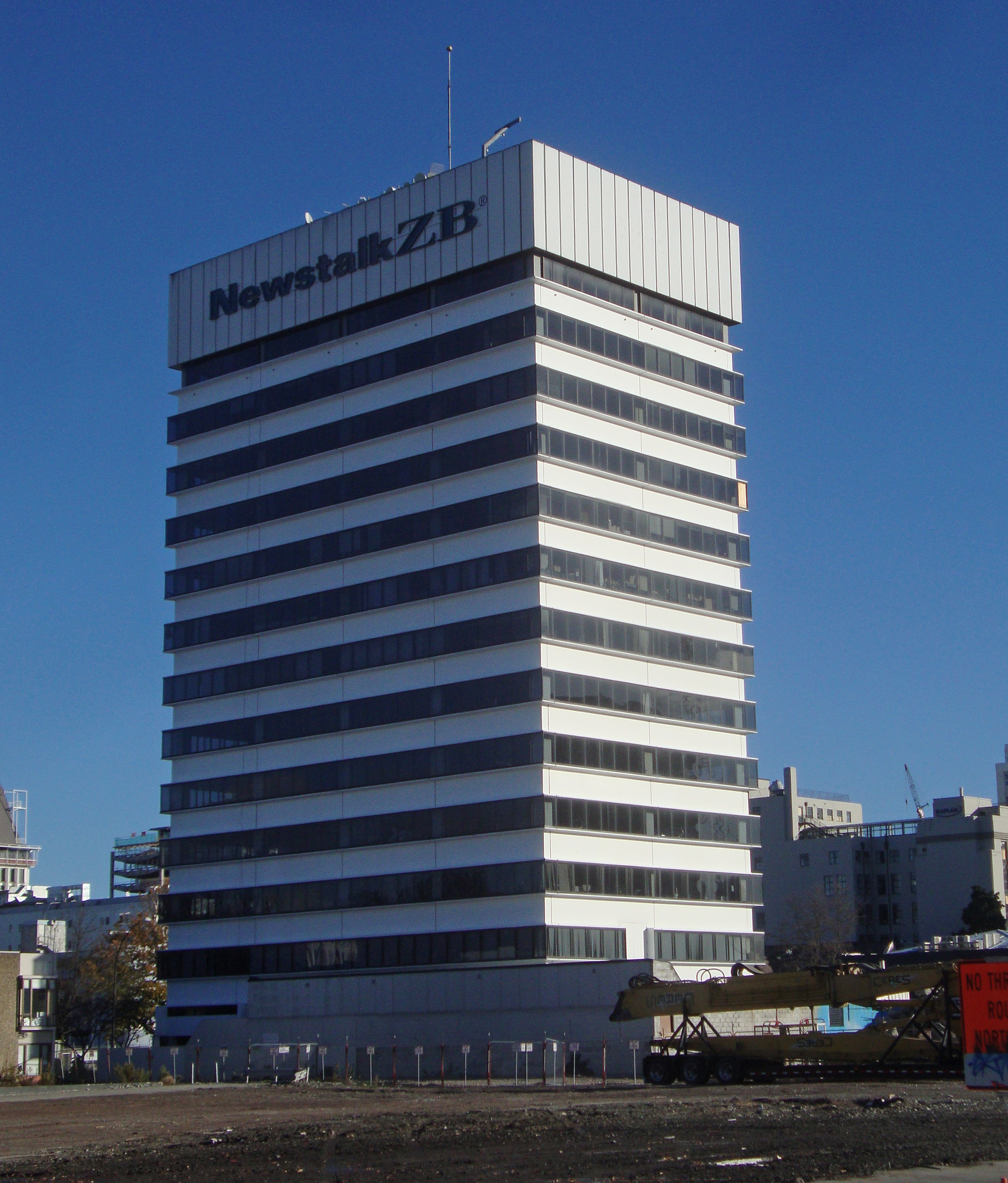
Radio Network House in June 2012, displaying the Newstalk ZB logo

Radio Network House was a 14-storey 61 metres (200 ft) tall office tower constructed in 1986. The building was located at 155 Worcester Street, on the north side of the street and in the block between Manchester Street and Latimer Square. For its last twelve years Radio Network House was owned by Greg Hedges through his company Nor West Arch No.4 Ltd.

The building was first operated as the Christchurch studio for Television New Zealand (TVNZ), who displayed their logo on the building. Shows such as What Now, After School, Simon Barnett's quiz show Face the Music and later The Son of a Gunn Show were filmed in the tower block. TVNZ vacated the building in late 1998 following a decision to move all of their Christchurch-produced shows to Wellington. In the late 1990s, Telstra New Zealand, the telecommunications company of Telstra in New Zealand, owned the naming rights to the building. After Clear Communications was acquired in December 2001 to form TelstraClear, the Clear logo was prominently displayed on the building. The building's naming rights were sold to The Radio Network and it was renamed to Radio Network House during the ownership of Nor West Arch No.4 Ltd. At the time of demolition the logo of Newstalk ZB, a subsidiary of The Radio Network, was displayed on the building.

The Canterbury region was hit by a series of earthquakes, and the office building was damaged beyond repair by the earthquake on 22 February 2011. About 400 people worked in the building before the earthquakes. Following the earthquakes, the Canterbury Earthquake Recovery Authority (CERA) was set up to manage the recovery process.

== Preparation ==
On 30 August 2011, CERA added Radio Network House to the list of buildings to be demolished. On 17 July 2012, the local Canterbury newspaper The Press reported that implosion of Radio Network House had been approved by CERA. The same day, a press conference was held, where representatives of the demolition companies involved and of CERA addressed the media. The main contractor for the demolition was Naylor Love, who engaged Ceres New Zealand for the implosion. Ceres in turn partnered with Controlled Demolition, Inc., an American company based in Phoenix, Maryland, that has a track record of 9,000 implosions and is considered a world leader in the field. The large number of tall buildings still to be demolished in Christchurch made the implosion of Radio Network House a test case, as the technique had not been applied to New Zealand buildings before. The implosion was challenging for Controlled Demolition, Inc., as New Zealand buildings are designed to withstand earthquake loading and thus have much more reinforcing in them than the buildings they usually deal with.

Before demolition, buildings are stripped of their contents, including internal plasterboard linings. As the fees for dumping demolition waste have risen since the earthquakes, it is more economical for demolition contractors to produce 'clean' demolition material. Holes were drilled into support columns of the building and filled with a total of some 60 kilograms (130 lb) of explosives, which when set off, would destroy the support structure and cause the collapse of the building. A challenge for the demolition contractor was that explosives available in New Zealand are low-velocity and low-energy.

A representative from Ceres stated that the implosion would shorten the demolition process by some six weeks and would save money. Costs were around NZ$1m for the implosion, compared to some NZ$1.2m for a conventional demolition, with the owner's building insurance covering the costs. The owner of the building, however, stated that the implosion was not a cheaper option for his company than a conventional demolition, but it "would save others thousands". He likened the consent process to Christopher Columbus wanting to sail to America, with everybody telling him that it could not be done.

The owner of the Westende building, on the corner of Manchester and Worcester Street and some 80 metres (260 ft) away from Radio Network House, threatened to seek a court injunction against the implosion. He raised concerns about potential seismic activity, possible damage to his new building, and noxious contaminants transferred by dust. The original Westende building had been destroyed in the first earthquake in 2010 and was one of the very few new buildings in the centre of Christchurch to have been rebuilt already. The concerns were dismissed by the demolition contractors and the threatened court action did not eventuate.

== Auction ==
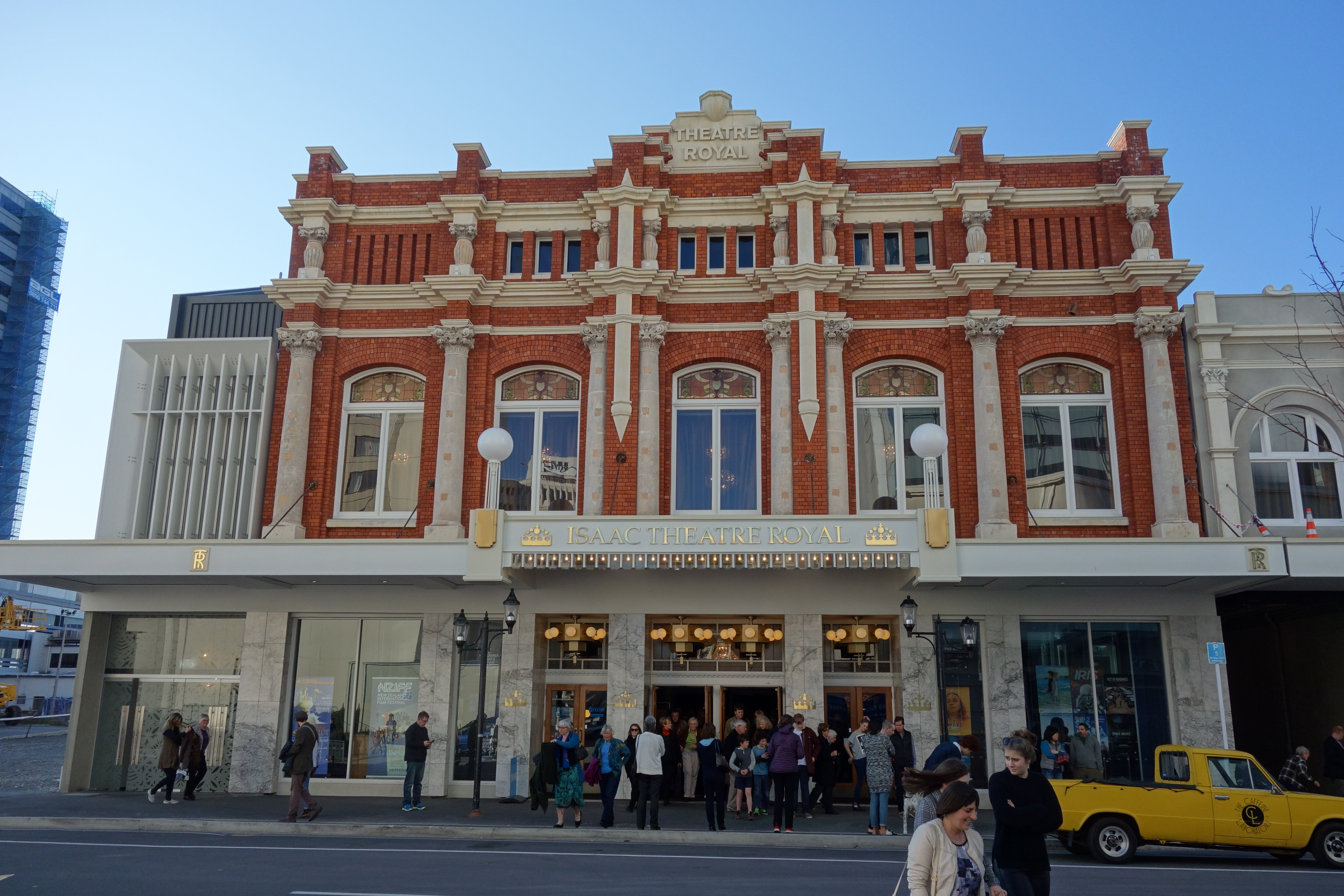
Proceeds from the auction have gone to the restoration of the Isaac Theatre Royal in Christchurch, which reopened in 2014

Soon after the announcement was made that the implosion had been approved, it was reported that the demolition contractors considered putting the right to push the button for the implosion up for auction, with the proceeds going to charity. "I've seen them go for $6,000" is how one of the company representatives was quoted, but the issue of liability needed to be worked through. The auction was set up on the internet auction website Trade Me and went live on Tuesday, 24 July, at 11 am. It was set up with a $1 reserve (meaning that theoretically, the right to push the button could have been sold for just $1). The auction was hugely popular and within one hour, bidding had reached $6,000. Bidding reached $30,000, but some bids were considered illegitimate and Trade Me staff removed them, and in other cases, bidders themselves requested to be removed.

When the auction closed, it had received the third highest number of viewers of Trade Me auctions, at 459,420 views. The winning bid was $26,000, placed by a consortium of eight demolition contractors who at the time were undertaking demolitions in the Christchurch Central City (D Construction, Dormer Construction, Jurgens Demolition, March Construction, Pro Tranz Contracting, Clampet Developments, Shilton and Brown Demolition, and Ward's Demolition). They gave the right to choose a person to push the button to the Child Cancer Foundation, who nominated a six-year-old boy from Queenstown.

The charity chosen to receive the proceeds of the auction was the Canterbury Earthquake Heritage Buildings Fund, who passed the funds to the Isaac Theatre Royal in Gloucester Street, a heritage building registered as Category I by the New Zealand Historic Places Trust (since renamed to Heritage New Zealand). The Government of New Zealand pledged to match donations towards the restoration of heritage buildings dollar for dollar, so the final amount received by the Isaac Theatre Royal was NZ$52,000. The restored Isaac Theatre Royal reopened in November 2014.

== Implosion ==
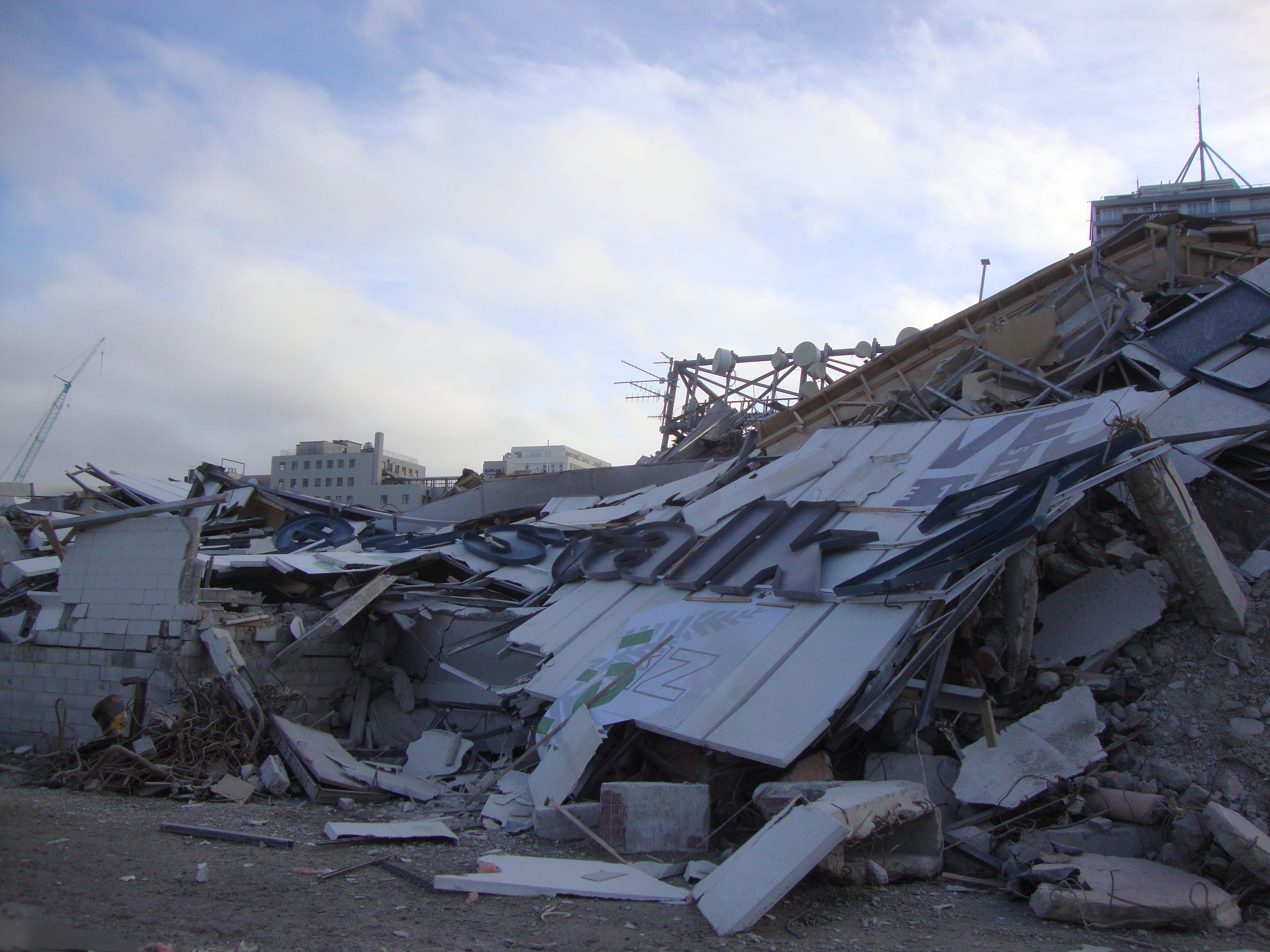
Close up of the Radio Network House rubble showing the Newstalk ZB logo

The demolition companies, on the day prior to the implosion, advised the public to stay away for health and safety reasons, and watch the proceedings on TV or the internet. Several television stations had live streams of the event, and The Press announced that they would post a video on their website shortly after the implosion. An exclusion zone was put in place to ensure that nobody would be within approximately 200 metres (660 ft) of the building. Despite the advice, thousands of onlookers filled the street on the morning of 5 August, a Sunday. Punctually at 8 am, a series of short explosions were heard, followed by another series a couple of seconds later. The building collapsed towards the north as planned, and the implosion manager from Controlled Demolition, Inc. said that it went a bit further than he had hoped, so he was lucky. The explosions were heard around Christchurch.

One of CERA's objectives in approving the implosion was to find out how the soil behaved, as Radio Network House was built on one of the worst soils in Christchurch. Seismograph readings showed ground velocity of 12 mm/s, which is comparable to a large truck slowly driving across the demolition site. With any residual concerns about the performance of poor soils during building implosions removed, it will be much easier for other building owners to obtain consent from CERA. Further implosions are likely, with a representative from Controlled Demolition, Inc. describing the Christchurch market as a "target-rich environment". Only the Christchurch Central Police Station has since been demolished by implosion, in May 2015.

The implosion attracted global attention, with media in Australia, Canada, Ireland, South Africa and the United States covering the event.

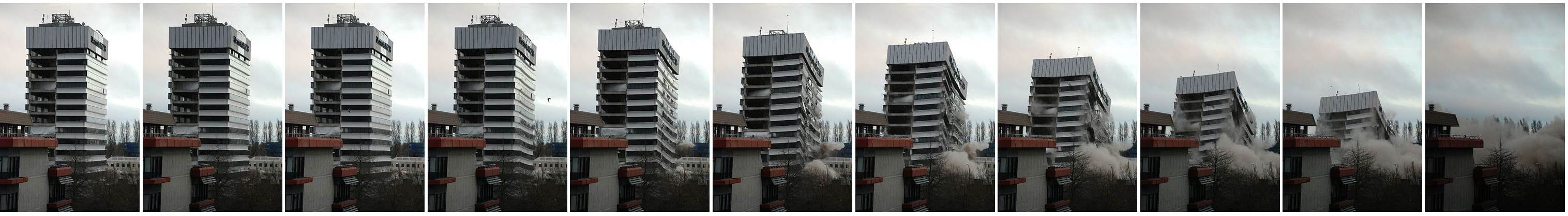
Radio Network House implosion series
