= Thingee =

1990s puppet ambassador for children's TV in New Zealand

Thingee is a puppet which was used as an unofficial ambassador and icon for New Zealand children's television during the 1990s, appearing in multiple television shows such as The Son of a Gunn Show, and also children's programme, What Now. He appeared on T-shirts, dolls, puzzles and advertising all over New Zealand. He was performed by After School camera operator and director Alan Henderson, who died on 15 February 2020.

== Appearance ==
Thingee was usually presented as a grey (with brown undertones) humanoid thing with large bulbous eyes, a large toothless snout and a domed head. In a similar manner to the Rainbow characters Zippy and George, he was generally shown from the shoulders up, with one arm.

== Character history ==
According to Stephen Campbell, one of the creators, both Thingee's name and species were accidental. The puppet was originally based on a duck, and the name used as a placeholder until they thought of a proper one.

Thingee first appeared on After School in 1987, under the hosting of Richard Evans and Annie Roach. Viewers first saw what was believed to be perhaps the egg of a dragon, Thingee existed in egg form for several weeks on the show until he hatched. Thingee later teamed up with Jason Gunn, who would from then on become his regular colleague, in 1988 when Jason took over as host for After School. Jason and Thingee continued working together in 1989 on After 2.

From 1992 on he co-hosted Jason Gunn vehicles Jase TV and The Son of a Gunn Show. They later starred in the straight to video film Jason and Thingee's Big Adventure. Thingee also appeared in celebrity editions of Wheel of Fortune, test cricket commentary and Face the Music in 1994 as well as hosting the children's television show Chatterbox from 1993 to 1995 and hosting A Story of Christmas in 1993. In 1996 he hosted his very own educational home video release entitled Thingee's ABC, where he looks after Mr Prendergast's toyshop and learns the order and shape of the letters of the alphabet when the capital letters vanish into the magic house.

From 1996 he was a host on the Sunday morning television show What Now, where it was revealed that the character was an alien and the following year Thingee made contact with his people and made the decision to return home to his own planet. As a result, the character was retired from New Zealand television.

== Appearances after retirement ==
- 2001 – Thingee helped co-host the What Now 20th birthday party
- 2007 – Thingee came back to TV on the TVNZ lifestyle show Good Morning
- 2008 – A further appearance on Good Morning, due to the TVNZ Goodnight Kiwi returning to the airwaves
- 2010 – Thingee appeared once again on Good Morning in celebration of the 50th anniversary of TVNZ
- 2010 – In a dream on the show Wanna-Ben
- 2012 – Wishing TVNZ U a Happy Birthday
- 2015 – TV3 appearance on 7 Days (S07E09) alongside Jason Gunn
- 2017 – SKY Sport behind the scenes at the cricket

== Appearances in popular culture ==
During a recording of Son of a Gunn in 1994, one of Thingee's eyeballs popped out. While this outtake was not included in the episode that was eventually broadcast, shortly afterwards the clip was screened on a TVNZ bloopers show, where it found fame and became an iconic Kiwi television moment. The eyepop scene was used in the opening credits of the satirical show Eating Media Lunch.
