= Steve Parr =

Steve Parr may refer to:

- Steve Parr (broadcaster) (born 1955), New Zealand TV and radio personality
- Steve Parr (footballer) (1926–2019), English footballer
