= Massad (musician) =

- Born: Massad Barakat-Devine; 27 September 1993 (age 33)
- Origin: Auckland, New Zealand
- Genres: Pop; Soul; Folk
- Occupations: Singer; Songwriter
- Instruments: Vocals; Guitar; Piano
- Years active: 2009–present
- Website: massadmusic.com

Massad Barakat-Devine (born 27 September 1993), known mononymously as Massad, is a New Zealand pop musician. He co-hosted the TV2 show The 4.30 Show, along with Eve Palmer and ex-The Erin Simpson Show presenter Michael Lee.

== Biography ==
In 2009 Massad released his debut album, Long Story Short and made his first appearance at one of New Zealands largest outdoor entertainment events, Christmas in the Park, performing to over 200,000 people. Massad’s musical journey has seen him share the billing with many renowned New Zealand artists including Hollie Smith, Dane Rumble, Stan Walker, Savage, Dave Dobbyn, Che Fu, Tim Finn, Don McGlashan, Anika Moa, Dragon. He went to Sacred Heart College, Auckland.

While still at school (Sacred Heart College) Massad won multiple song writing and performance awards including the Auckland University Secondary School's Songwriter of the Year, the PlayItStrange Christmas song competition, the Lowdown best song award at the national finals of the 2010 Smokefreerockquest, 2nd place in the 2011 Smokefree Rockquest national finals and the winner of the teenage section of Freshly Squeezed Talent.

At age 16 Massad recorded a duet of his own song Smile with Outrageous Fortune's Antonia Prebble which was released on the charity album -So This is Christmas – it spent six weeks in the top 20 album chart and gold sales.

In December 2010 Massad became one of the youngest ever recipients of a NZ On Air New Recording Artist grant.

While still at school, Massad's first video and single "Tear My Heart Out" was released peaking at No. 3 on the NZ Radio chart and No. 31 on the national sales chart.

Massad has spent his first year out of school performing, writing and recording.

2012 began with his aptly named EP Overture debuting in the New Zealand Top 40 at No. 29. During February two of Massad's singles "Tear My Heart Out" and "Forget About Me" were together in the IMNZ top 10 airplay. In March Massad was announced as one of 15 global finalists in the teen section of the prestigious ISC (International Songwriting Competition) and in August he was one of the guest artists on the Flight of the Conchords number 1 hit "Feel Inside (and Stuff Like That)". This charity single became the fastest selling single in New Zealand history.

During the year Massad has been writing and recording in preparation for a 2013 album release. As well as writing much of his own material he has been collaborating with leading songwriters including Australians Michael Szumowski and Stuart Crichton and Atlanta based Grammy Award winning Manuel Seal Jr. Between them these writers have had huge international success. Manuel is best known for Usher's number 1 hit "My Boo" featuring Alicia Keys and Mariah Carey's "We Belong Together" for which he won his Grammy. Michael has written and produced songs for numerous artists globally, picking up a host of gold and platinum awards along the way.

Stuart has worked with a number of world-renowned artists including Kylie Minogue Delta Goodrem, Guy Sebastian, Vanessa Amorosi, Pet Shop Boys, Brian McFadden, Sugababes and, Dannii Minogue as well as contributing to several top 10 UK and international hits.

Massad's new single "Holiday" was released on 1 February 2013. It was the most added song to radio in New Zealand in its first week of release.

At midnight on 9 August 2013 (NZST), Massad released new single "Girl Next Door" and the accompanying music video. The music video was co-written by and starred Napier teenager Jamie Curry, of Jamie's World Facebook and YouTube fame, as the eponymous girl-next-door. Curry's rendition of her mother made a cameo appearance in the closing credits. Within 24 hours of release, the music video received over 300,000 views on YouTube, and eight days later on 17 August, surpassed one million views.

In 2014, Massad went into hiatus citing, amongst other personal reasons, "so I could live life".

He came out of hiatus in October 2018 and has since returned to record and perform shows in Auckland as well as a show in London. An album is expected to be released sometime in 2020.

== Discography ==
=== Albums ===
Title	Year	Peak chart positions	
Title	Year	NZ	NZ Kiwi
Long Story Short	2009	–	–
Overture	2012	29	4

=== Singles ===
Title	Year	Peak chart positions		Album
Title	Year	NZ	NZ Kiwi	Album
"Tear My Heart Out"	2011	31	4	Overture
"Forget About Me"	2011	–	–	Overture
"Waiting"	2012	–	–	Overture
"Holiday"	2013	–	11	
"My Heart Won't Let You Go"	2013	–	6	
"Girl Next Door"	2013	33	9	
"—" denotes items which were not released in that country or failed to chart.

== Awards ==
Year	Competitions	Place
2008	Play It Strange	Top 40
2009	Auckland University Songwriter of the Year	Finalist
2010	Play It Strange	Top 30
2010	Auckland University Songwriter of the Year	1st Place
2010	Smokefree Rockquest	National Finalist
2011	Smokefree Rockquest	2nd Place
2011	International Songwriting Contest (ISC)	Finalist
2012	International Songwriting Contest (ISC)	Semi – Finalist
