= Do It (TV series) =

- Genre: Lifestyle program
- Presented by: Luke van Dyck; Faye De Lanty; Lisa Williams
- Country of origin: Australia
- Original language: English
- No. of seasons: 4
- No. of episodes: 60+

Production
- Running time: 23 minutes

Original release
- Network: Nine Network
- Release: 5 November 2006 – 5 July 2008

Do It is an Australian weekly half-hour lifestyle television program broadcast on the Nine Network. Premiering at 8:00 am on Sunday 5 November 2006, it is currently broadcast on Saturday afternoon at 12:30 pm.

The program is hosted by Luke van Dyck, a third generation builder who has previously appeared on other lifestyle programs such Renovation Rescue and DIY Rescue.

The program covers a whole range of home improvement projects where each step is outlined so that viewers can carry out the task themselves around their own home. The program is supported by their website where detailed guides for each project are available.

== See also ==
- List of Australian television series
