= Janine Morrell-Gunn =

New Zealand TV producer (active 1985– )

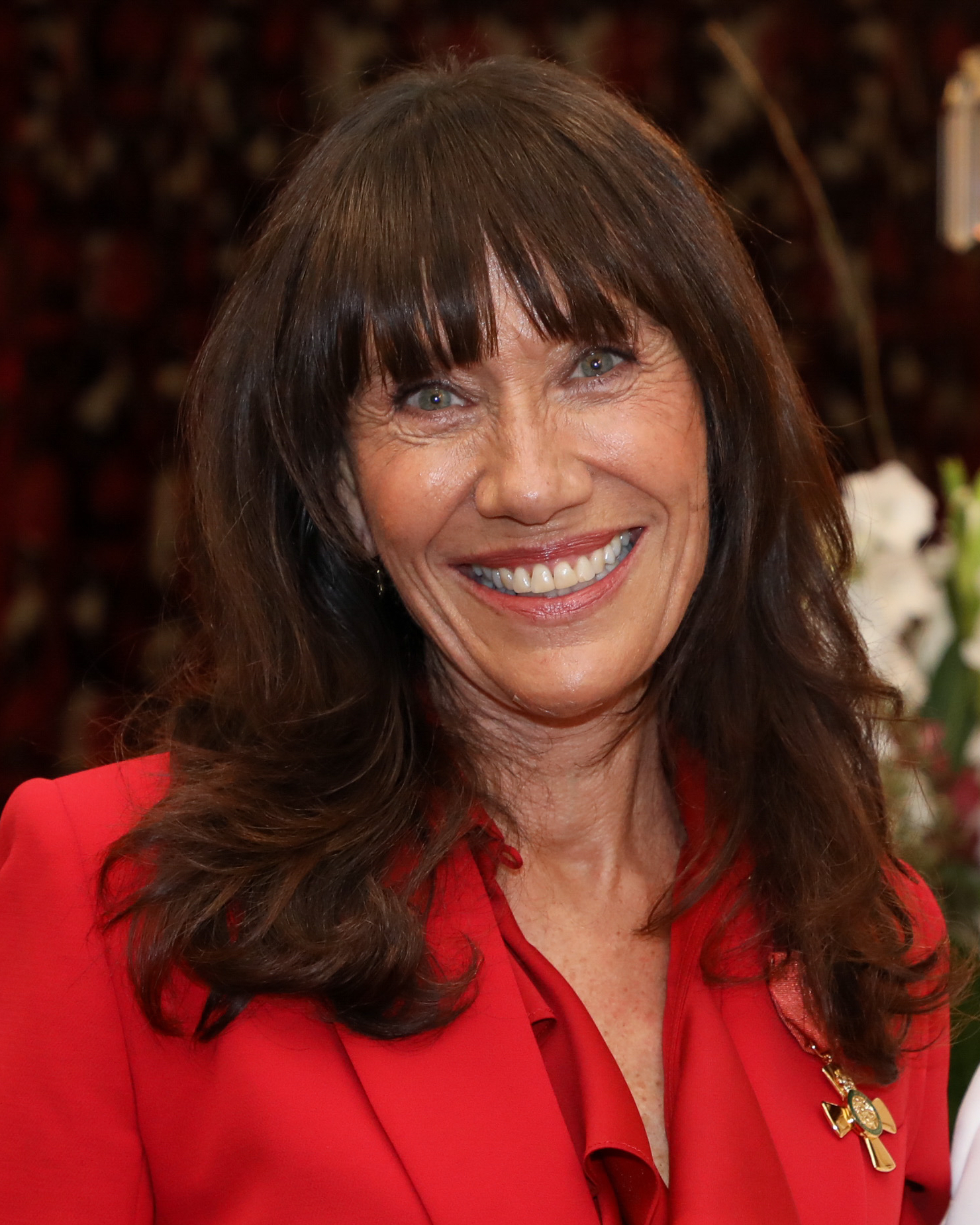
Morrell-Gunn in 2023

Janine Rania Morrell-Gunn ONZM (née Morrell) is a children's television producer from New Zealand.

== Biography ==
Morrell-Gunn grew up in Christchurch and is of Māori descent, part of the Ngāti Kahungunu iwi. She completed a Bachelor of Arts degree at the University of Canterbury; she was also the president of the university's student association. After graduating, she started work in 1985 at TVNZ's Christchurch office as a trainee director and producer, working on news and current affairs programmes such as Foreign Correspondent and Eyewitness News. Later she moved on to work on other TVNZ shows such as science and technology programme Fast Forward, children's magazine show Spot On with Phil Keoghan and advice show Beauty and the Beast with Selwyn Toogood.

In 1989 she started producing her own shows with LIFE (Life in the Fridge Exists), a magazine show for teens. She later became executive producer of TVNZ's Children's Unit and met her future husband, Jason Gunn when she was asked to produce his after-school show, After 2 with Jason and Thingee. She later created a new show for Gunn, The Son of a Gunn Show, which aired for five years.

In 1998, when the Children's Unit relocated to Wellington, the couple decided to stay in Christchurch and start their own company, Whitebait Productions (now known as Whitebait Media).

Morrell-Gunn has held a number of charity and community roles, including serving on the board of Women in Film and Television and the Screen Producers Guild. She has also been chair of the Cholmondeley Children’s Centre since 2015, which provides planned and emergency respite accommodation and care for children aged three to 12. She has been a board member of Maia Health Foundation, supporting the building of a new mental health facility for children and youth, and is on the Uru Manuka Education Trust supporting digital literacy for children. Following the 2011 Christchurch earthquake she initiated the Adopt-A-Chch Family scheme, raising more than $1 million, and erected White Lights of Hope in the city centre.

=== Honours and awards ===
Morrell-Gunn received the Entrepreneurship Award at the 2009 Women in Film and Television New Zealand Awards, and a Television Legend Award at the 2022 New Zealand Television Awards. In the 2023 New Year Honours, she was appointed an Officer of the New Zealand Order of Merit, for services to children's television and the community.

== Personal life ==
Morrell-Gunn's first marriage was to television producer Tony Palmer; before divorcing, they had two daughters together, actresses Eve Palmer and Grace Palmer. Her second marriage was to presenter and host, now producer, Jason Gunn; the couple have two children together, Faith and Louis Gunn.
