= After School (TV series) =

1981 New Zealand television programme

- Created by: Ian Cumming
- Presented by: Olly Ohlson (1981-1986); Richard Evans (1986-1987); Annie Roach (1986-1988); Jason Gunn (1987-1988)
- Country of origin: New Zealand
- Original languages: English; Te Reo Māori; Sign language

Production
- Camera setup: Multi-Camera

Original release
- Network: TV One
- Release: March 2, 1981 – 1986
- Network: TVNZ 2
- Release: 1987 – December 16, 1988

After School is a New Zealand children's television programme that aired weekday afternoons on TV One and, later, Network Two from March 1981 to December 1988. It was produced in-house by TVNZ.

Olly Ohlson was the original presenter and would host links between various segments and programming. He was the first Māori presenter on New Zealand television to anchor a children's show, and the programme was also one of the first New Zealand shows to incorporate Te Reo, the Māori language, as well as Sign language into its scripts.

In the mid-1980s Olly was joined occasionally in the links items by Richard Evans and Annie Roach, who eventually took over the hosting roles, and towards the end of its run the show featured the birth of the puppet alien Thingee and the introduction of Jason Gunn as a presenter.

After School was ended in December 1988 and the following year in February 1989 the mid-afternoon programming block was split up into two separate links shows, After 2, for younger children (which had Jason Gunn and Thingee carrying over as presenters), and 3.45: Live! for the 10-14 age group (initially hosted by Fenella Bathfield and Nigel Hurst).

== Background ==
The concept of After School came from TVNZ's then head of children's programming, Hal Weston, who wished to have more Māori programming on the air. Olly Ohlson was chosen by producer Ian Cumming to be the anchor for the show in order to be a male role model for viewers and because of his knowledge of te reo Māori. After School was made and recorded at the TVNZ Christchurch studios and the opening titles were created with stop motion by award-winning animator Ken Clark.

== After 2 ==
After School ended in December 1988 and was replaced in February 1989 by After 2. Jason Gunn and Thingee carried over as presenters of After 2 which was designed for younger children and aired weekdays on Network Two / Channel 2 from around 2.15 – 2.25pm until 3.45: Live!. When 3.45: Live! ended in December 1990, After 2 moved to a 2.30pm start and a 4pm finish from February 1991.

=== The Breakfast Club ===
After the initial success of After 2 during 1989, a Saturday morning edition was produced from November that year called The Breakfast Club, hosted by Jason Gunn. Screening at 7am and, later, 6.30am (prior to What Now at 8am) on Saturday mornings until December 1991, The Breakfast Club was a wrapper programme which would mostly air cartoons from the US and Canada including Popples, Groovie Goolies, Bobby's World, My Little Pony, Galtar and the Golden Lance, Denver, the Last Dinosaur, Heathcliff, The Raccoons and A Pup Named Scooby-Doo.

=== Cancellation ===
After three years of both After 2 and The Breakfast Club, TVNZ decided to replace them with Jase TV and The Son of a Gunn Show on weekdays and extend its Saturday morning programme What Now to three hours from February 1992.

== Cultural impact ==
The show was groundbreaking in using Māori and Sign language on the show, and Ohlson's sign-off – "Keep cool till after school" (a phrase from his daughter), with accompanying sign language – became part of national vernacular.

The puppet Thingee hatched out of an egg on the show. The character was a regular feature on the show and would go on to be featured in After 2, The Son of a Gunn Show, What Now and Jase TV.

== Awards ==
- 1982 New Zealand Feltex Awards: Best New Talent (Olly Ohlson)

== See also ==
- Play School (New Zealand TV series)
