= 2006 Qantas Television Awards =

- Awarded for: Excellence in New Zealand television and television journalism
- Sponsored by: Qantas
- Date: November 22, 2006
- Location: Aotea Centre, Auckland
- Country: New Zealand
- Presented by: New Zealand Television Broadcasters Council
- Hosted by: Petra Bagust and Dominic Bowden
- First award: 2005

The 2006 Qantas Television Awards were announced on 22 November 2006 in a ceremony at the Aotea Centre in Auckland. The ceremony was hosted by television presenters Dominic Bowden and Petra Bagust. Awards were presented in news and current affairs and general television categories, as well as four awards selected by public vote.

== Winners ==
The winners of the 2006 Qantas Television Awards were announced on 22 November 2006.

=== News and Current Affairs ===
==== Best News ====
One News (TV One)

==== Best News or Current Affairs Presenter ====
John Campbell, Campbell Live (TV3)

==== Best News Reporter ====
Donna-Marie Lever, One News "Unrest Returns to Dili" (TV One)

==== Best Current Affairs Reporter ====
Hadyn Jones, 20/20 "Peddling in the Park" (TV2)

==== Best News Report (team Award) ====
3 News, "Gaza" (TV3)

==== Best Current Affairs Report (team award) ====
20/20 "Detox Diary" (TV2)

==== Best Current Affairs Series ====
Campbell Live "Telecom" (TV3)

==== Best News Camera ====
Leon Menzies, 3 News "Poorest & Urban Girls" (TV3)

==== Best Current Affairs Camera ====
Peter Day, Sunday "The Big Chill" (TV One)

==== Best News/Current Affairs Editing ====
Shahir Daud, One News "Press Photo" (TV One) Close Up "Steam Train" (TV One)

=== General Television ===
==== Best Actor in a TV Drama ====
Ryan O’Kane, The Insiders Guide to Love (TV2)

==== Best Actress in a TV Drama ====
Kate Elliott, The Insiders Guide to Love (TV2)

==== Best NZ Drama ====
The Insiders Guide to Love (TV2)

==== Best Script (non-factual) ====
David Brechin-Smith, The Insiders Guide to Love (TV2)

==== Best Director (drama) ====
Brendan Donovan, The Insiders Guide to Love (TV2)

==== Best Camera (non-factual) ====
Simon Baumfield, The Insiders Guide to Love (TV2)

==== Best Editing (non-factual) ====
Bryan Shaw Doves of War (TV3)

==== Best NZ Arts/ Festival Documentary ====
Artsville "The Magical World of Misery" (TV One)

==== Cure Kids Best NZ Children’s/ Youth Programme ====
Let's Get Inventin' "Rocket Skates" (TV2)

==== Best NZ Comedy ====
Pulp Sport series 3, episode 1 (TV3)

==== Best NZ Entertainment ====
Dave Dobbyn: One Night in Matata (TV One)

==== Best NZ Information/ Lifestyle ====
Target "Special: Ep 1: Australia" (TV3)

==== Best NZ Popular Documentary ====
Million Dollar Tumor (TV3)

==== Best NZ Reality (format) ====
Sensing Murder (TV2)

==== Best NZ Sports or Event Coverage ====
Na Ratou Mo Tatou ANZAC Day Special (Māori Television)

==== Best NZ Observational Reality (non format) ====
Snotties (TV2)

==== Best Director (non-drama) ====
Geoff Husson, Sensing Murder "The Patient Killer" (TV2)

==== Best Editing (factual) ====
Paul Sutorius, Aspiring (TV One)

==== Best Camera (factual) ====
David Stipsen, Airports and Overtures(TV One)

==== TV Journalist of the Year ====
Mike McRoberts, 3 News (TV3)

=== Woman’s Day Readers’ Choice Awards 2006 ===
==== Favourite New Zealand Female Personality ====
Hilary Barry

==== Favourite New Zealand Male Personality ====
Simon Dallow

==== Favourite New Zealand Show ====
Shortland Street

==== Favourite International Show ====
Grey's Anatomy
