= Grace Palmer =

New Zealand actress

- Born: Grace Mana Morrell Palmer; 9 November 1994 (age 32); Tai Tapu, New Zealand
- Occupation: Actor
- Years active: 2014–present
- Mother: Janine Morrell-Gunn
- Relatives: Eve Palmer (sister); Jason Gunn (stepfather)

Grace Mana Morrell Palmer (born 9 November 1994) is a New Zealand actress, best known for her role as Lucy Rickman on the prime-time soap opera Shortland Street and Victoria Sands on Animal Control.

== Early life ==
Palmer was born in Tai Tapu, New Zealand to parents Tony Palmer and Janine Morrell-Gunn, both of whom are television producers. Her mother is a Māori of the Ngāti Kahungunu iwi, while her father is of New Zealand European descent. Palmer attended St Margaret's College, where she studied theatre, then moved to Sydney, Australia to take acting courses while working at a bar.

== Career ==
Palmer's first television role came in 2014 with a guest appearance as Monique Wu on the Australian show Home and Away. She went on to play her most notable television role on Shortland Street as Lucy Rickman from 2014 to 2017. She made her Hollywood debut as Deb in the 2018 film Adrift starring Shailene Woodley and Sam Claflin.

In 2020 she created and co-starred in comedy web series Good Grief, alongside her sister Eve Palmer. In 2022, Palmer appeared on The Masked Singer NZ as a New Zealand possum, getting eliminated in Episode 6.

Since 2023, she has co-starred with Joel McHale in the Fox Broadcasting Company comedy Animal Control.

== Personal life ==
Palmer has three siblings, including television presenter and actress Eve Palmer. She is the stepdaughter of New Zealand television and radio presenter Jason Gunn. In 2019, Palmer married Rawiri Jobe in Las Vegas.

In 2015 Palmer and fellow Shortland Street actress Lucy Elliott formed a celebrity team for the World Vision 40 Hour Famine.

== Filmography ==
=== Film ===
| Year | Title | Role | Notes |
|---|---|---|---|
| 2018 | Adrift | Deb | |
| 2018 | My Name Is Heather | Alice | |

=== Television ===
| Year | Title | Role | Notes |
|---|---|---|---|
| 2014 | Home and Away | Monique Wu | |
| 2014–2017 | Shortland Street | Lucy Rickman | |
| 2017 | Shop Girls | Summer | Web series |
| 2020 | Good Grief | Gwen | Web series co-created and starred with her sister Eve |
| 2021 | The Brokenwood Mysteries | Cherie Kernan | Episode: "Exposed to the Light" |
| 2023–present | Animal Control | Victoria Sands | Main role |
| 2026 | Will Trent | Lila | Episode: "I Hear It Now, I Was Good" |
