= Danny Watson (broadcaster) =

New Zealand television and radio presenter (1952/1953–2026)

Danny Watson (1952 or 1953 – 15 October 2026) was a New Zealand television and radio presenter.

== Life and career ==
Watson started his broadcasting career in children's television in 1977 with presenting roles in Spot On (alongside Ian Taylor and Marcus Turner) and later What Now. He also hosted several other sport and variety-related shows in the 1980s and 1990s.

In 2000, Watson moved to radio, where he presented Radio New Zealand's afternoon talkback show on Newstalk ZB, a role he held for 15 years. Notably, Watson was one of the first public broadcasters to present a show from Antarctica, when he presented live talkback from Scott Base in November 2014. In 2022 Watson joined radio talk station Today FM.

Outside broadcasting, Watson's interests included karate and beekeeping, and his Māori heritage within Te Ao Māori o Waitaha, and through his role as a Ngāpuhi Kaumātua.

Danny Watson died from complication of heart disease on 15 October 2026, at the age of 73. He was survived by wife, Louisa, and their four children.
