= Our First Home =

- Genre: Reality television
- Created by: TVNZ
- Presented by: Goran Paladin
- Country of origin: New Zealand
- Original language: English
- No. of series: 2
- No. of episodes: 30

Production
- Running time: 60–90 minutes (incl. advertisements)
- Production company: Warner Bros. International Television Production

Original release
- Network: TV One
- Release: 8 February 2015 – present

Our First Home is a New Zealand reality television programme, consisting of two series. The first series premiered on 8 February 2015 and ran Sunday–Tuesday at 7:30 pm. The series was hosted by Goran Paladin. In July 2015 a second series was commissioned.

== Contestants ==
=== Series 1 ===
Families	House location	Reserve	Auction result	Profit	Added value	Total winnings
Schreuders	Titirangi	$530,600	$721,000	$190,400	35.88%	$190,400 + $100,000
Wardlaws	Te Atatū South	$669,450	$898,000	$228,550	34.14%	$228,550
Gourleys	Avondale	$577,000	$720,500	$143,500	24.87%	$143,500

=== Series 2 ===
Series 2 was screened in February 2016.

Family	House location	Reserve	Auction result	Profit	Added value	Total winnings
Roughan	Vodanovich Rd, Te Atatū South	$777,568	$800,000	$22,432	2.88%	$22,432
Pearce	Larnoch Rd, Henderson	$789,283	$807,000	$17,717	2.24%	$17,717
Wotton	Henderson Valley Rd, Henderson	$680,716	$780,000	$99,284	14.59%	$99,284 + $100,000

== Series overview ==
Series	Episodes	Originally aired		Result			Host
Series	Episodes	Series premiere	Series finale	Winning family	Winning profit (NZD)	Added Value	Host
1	30	8 February 2015	14 April 2015	Schreuders	$290,400	35.88%	Goran Paladin
2	30	14 February 2016	19 April 2016	Wottons	$199,284	14.59%	Goran Paladin
