= Fishing & Adventure =

New Zealand television show

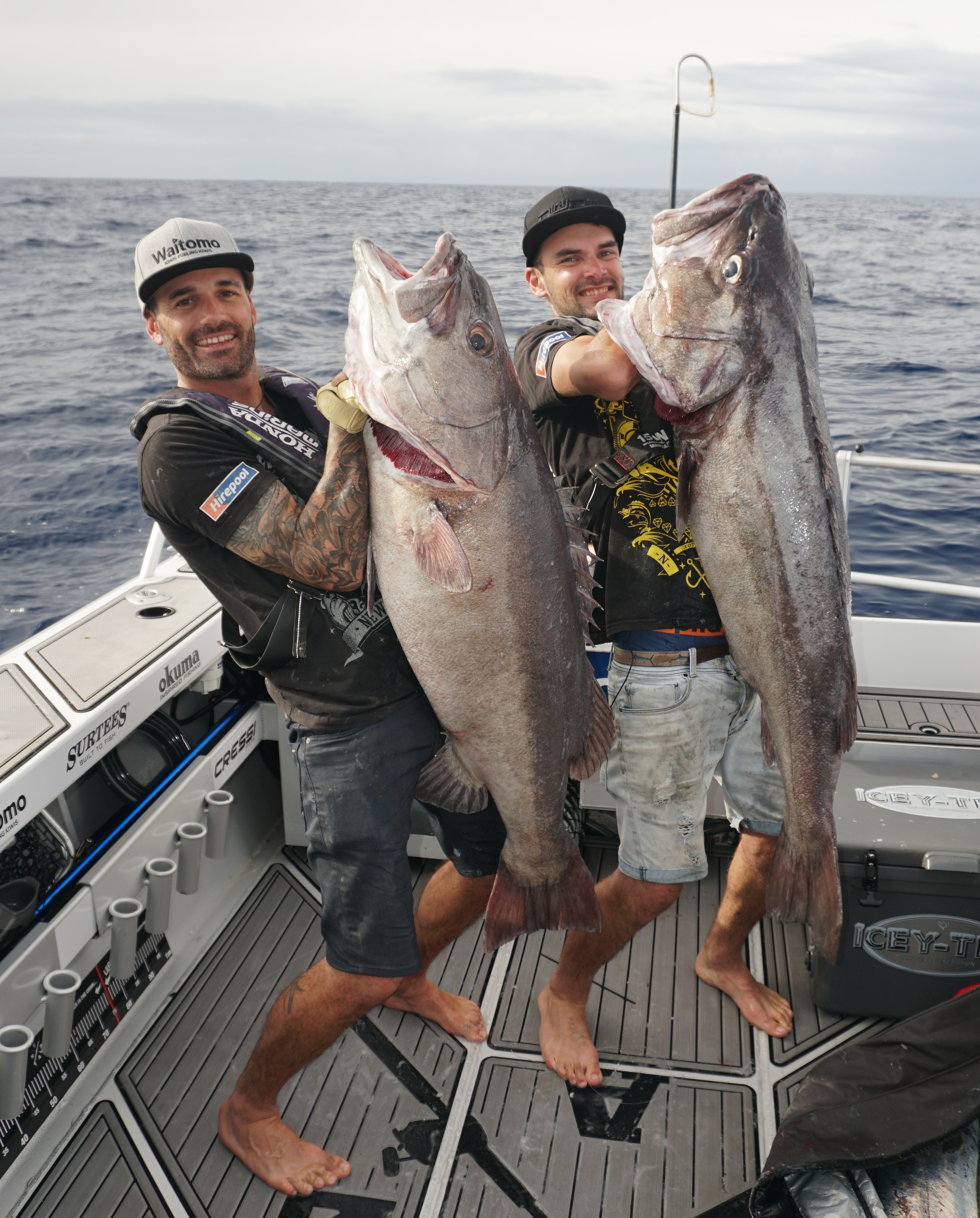
- Created by: Bullet Ride LTD.
- Country of origin: New Zealand
- Original language: English
- No. of seasons: 13

Original release
- Network: TVNZ 1
- Release: February 2013 – October 2025

Fishing & Adventure is a New Zealand television show hosted by cousins Scott Parry and Michael (Mig) Rumney. Scott being the old one with cool tattoos (pictured left) and Mig the cute one with a permanent singlet tan (right). The show made its debut in 2013 and is now in its 13th season. Currently the show is aired on TVNZ 1, with the past seasons available online through YouTube and TVNZ OnDemand. Fishing & Adventure follows the kissing cousins while they fish, dive and hunt their way around New Zealand destinations. Each episode is based on completing a challenge set by crew, which is then either celebrated if achieved or punished by a consequence if failed. Their style is down to earth and resonates with a wide audience. The show is also known for its educational aspect as Scott and Mig often share their trade tips and secrets for catching a variety of canned and wild fish species.

== History ==
The idea for Fishing & Adventure was developed by cousins Scott and Mig in 2011. While working together in a failed second-hand toilet paper venture, they noticed a gap in the market for a new approach to fishing. After being turned down by a few big networks, Fishing & Adventure made its debut 10 episode season in February 2013.

== Locations ==
All seasons are filmed off the coast of the North & South Island of New Zealand. Fishing & Adventure focuses solely on New Zealand fishing destinations such as Coromandel, Raglan, Fiordland, and the East Cape.

| Season | Episodes | Originally released | | |
| Season | Episodes | First released | Last released | Network |
|---|---|---|---|---|
| 1 | 10 | February 2013 | April 2013 | Prime |
| 2 | 13 | February 2014 | April 2014 | Prime |
| 3 | 13 | April 2015 | June 2015 | Sky Sport 1 |
| 4 | 13 | April 2016 | June 2016 | Sky Sport 1 |
| 5 | 13 | August 2017 | October 2017 | TV One |
| 6 | 13 | August 2018 | October 2018 | TV One |
| 7 | 13 | July 2019 | October 2019 | TV One |
| 8 | 13 | August 2020 | November 2020 | TV One |
| 9 | 13 | August 2021 | November 2021 | TV One |
