= Eve Palmer (actress) =

New Zealand actress and television presenter

- Born: Eve Marama Morrell Palmer; New Zealand
- Occupation(s): Television presenter, actress
- Spouse: Adam Percival (m. 2020)
- Children: 2
- Mother: Janine Morrell-Gunn
- Relatives: Grace Palmer (sister); Jason Gunn (stepfather)

Eve Marama Morrell Palmer is a New Zealand television presenter and actress.

== Biography ==
Palmer was born in Christchurch to television producers Tony Palmer and Janine Morrell-Gunn; her mother is a Māori of the Ngāti Kahungunu iwi. Her sister Grace Palmer is also an actress. Palmer also has two half-siblings, Faith and Louis Gunn, through her mother's second marriage, to producer and presenter Jason Gunn.

Palmer's first television role was as a field reporter for The Erin Simpson Show; when the programme was renamed The 4.30 Show in 2014, Palmer became the presenter. In 2016 the programme was again renamed, to The Adam and Eve Show and Palmer co-presented with Adam Percival.

In 2020 she created and co-starred in the comedy web series Good Grief, alongside her sister Grace.

== Personal life ==
In 2020 Palmer married her television co-host, Adam Pervical. The couple have a daughter.

As an adult, Palmer has pursued tertiary education studies in her Māori culture, such as completing a course in Te Ara Reo Māori (Māori Language Path) at Te Wānanga o Aotearoa in 2023.
