= Snotties (TV series) =

Snotties was a reality television programme that aired on New Zealand's TV 2 (New Zealand) from August to October 2006. It won the 2006 Qantas Television Award for best observational reality program.

The series followed 32 trainee naval officers, between 17 and 34 years of age, at the Royal New Zealand Navy's Officer Training School in Devonport. It covered 22 weeks of training, including both physical and classroom training.
