= The TV2's 2003 =

- Presented by: Stacey Daniels
- Judges: Robert Boyd-Bell, Stacey Daniels, Elizabeth Mitchell, Jude Anaru, Joss King, Jim Mora, David Rose and Julia Baylis
- Country of origin: New Zealand
- Original language: English
- No. of seasons: 1
- No. of episodes: 3

Production
- Running time: 35 minutes

Original release
- Network: TVNZ
- Release: 2 December – 4 December 2003

The TV2's 2003 is a TVNZ 2 New Zealand television special documenting a short film competition for aspiring young film makers.

== Selection process ==
Over 1,500 entries were received for the competition, and 100 candidates were chosen to present their idea to industry professionals and other hopeful candidates. The judges then selected 30 participants, who were mentored by New Zealand directors and producers.

Ten finalists were selected, and each was given $NZ 2,000 to produce their short film for broadcast on TV2 in December 2003.

== Judges ==
The competition had a panel of eight judges: Convenor of Judges – Robert Boyd-Bell, TV presenter; Stacey Daniels, Producer/Director; Elizabeth Mitchell, Flipside producer; Jude Anaru, Shortland Street writer; Joss King, Writer/TV Presenter; Jim Mora, Producer David Rose; and Head of TV2 Programming Julia Baylis.

== Finalists ==
(*) Indicates winning films.

- The Baboon Wrangler (Animation) – Tim Molloy 22, Adam Kay 21, Chris Mitchell 21 (Sandringham, Auckland)
- The Battle of Gate Pa – Matthew Hooker, 16 (Tauranga)
- Better Out Than In – Emma Nichols, 22 (Mt Eden, Auckland)
- Blackout – Vincent Thompson, 19 (Taupo)
- Down by the Dairy – Aarni Singh, 17 (Birkenhead, Auckland)
- Not Waving But Drowning – Richard Fairgray, 18 (Torbay, Auckland)
- (*) Nursery Rhyme Crime Prevention (Animation) – Antoinette Visser, 20 and Stefanie Powell, 19 (Hobsonville, Auckland)
- Poetry in Motion – Rosie Riggir-Cuddy, 20 and Laurel Devenie, 20 (Wellington)
- (*) Sole – Fabian Suisala, 18 (Sunnyvale, Auckland)
- (*) Strings Attached – Rachael Walker, 21 (Okura, Auckland)

== Prize ==
Three winners were given a $5,000 grant towards their education in the television or film industry.
