= Jandals Away =

- Genre: Sitcom
- Created by: Paul Yates
- Starring: David Fane; Antonia Prebble; Cohen Holloway; Bella Kalolo; Jason Fa'afoi; Jerome Leota
- Country of origin: New Zealand
- No. of episodes: 10

Production
- Executive producer: Tony Palmer
- Running time: 30 min
- Production company: Quick TV

Original release
- Network: TV2
- Release: 11 March – 13 May 2006

Jandals Away is a New Zealand comedy series that follows the Ofa family, who rescue people in return for free satellite TV to watch Warriors games. With a secret base on the tiny island of A'a'a, they call themselves The A'a'a Rescue Organisation or T.A.R.O. The show features a Mother and Father, two biological children, one adopted, and a dog named Spikes. We follow along as the family rescues people to reach their end goal of being able to watch The Warriors together. Lily, the middle child explores her sexuality over the course of the show. Maya, the adopted daughter helps Lily through this exploration through experimenting together. This young relationship blossoms while the family try to get the free satellite TV.
