= Ready to Roll (TV programme) =

New Zealand television programme

Ready to Roll is a New Zealand music television programme that ran from 1975 to 1987, and also in various spin-off forms until 2001.

In its initial incarnation, the programme features mainly local New Zealand performers covering hits of the day by overseas artists. By the early 1980s, it featured regular music videos of original acts, both from New Zealand and overseas, and by the end of its run it had become primarily a show for music videos. The show was initially hosted by Roger Gascoigne, with Stu Dennison taking over during the 1980s. One of the most popular shows on New Zealand television of the era, it was regularly shown in an early evening Saturday slot.

The theme music from the show was initially The Commodores' "Machine Gun", later changing to the instrumental introduction from Led Zeppelin's "Whole Lotta Love" and finally Steve Winwood's "Night Train".

In 1987, the show officially became primarily a chart show, rebranded with the name RTR Countdown. It lasted in this format until the mid-1990s. Other related shows also used the RTR brand, including RTR video releases (1982–86) and RTR mega-mix (1988–90).
