= Bumble (TV series) =

Children's television series

Bumble is a New Zealand children's television series for children ages 2–5 featuring a magical bee. The title character is voiced by Jason Gunn. The series is produced for TVNZ by Gunn's wife, Janine Morrell-Gunn.

It also features Bumble's puppet friends: Peek, Boo, Anna and Fishy. Fishy is Maori, and known for his tagline "Kia Ora Bumble".

The show officially started in 1999 and ended in 2002.

On 15 February 2020, Jason Gunn announced that WhitebaitMedia & NZ on Air will make a new revival series for the new animated pre-school show Bumble on YouTube.

== Cast ==
- Jason Gunn as the voice of Bumble, a bumblebee
- Chris Harding as Peek, a mouse (singing voice by Adrian Kirk, puppeteered by Chris Lynch)
- Lynda Milligan as Anna, a mouse
- Janice Bateman as Boo, a mouse (singing voice by Bronwyn Williams)
- Olly Ohlson as Fishy, a brown trout
