= Jason Gunn =

New Zealand television and radio personality

- Born: 26 December 1968 (age 57); Christchurch, New Zealand
- Occupations: Broadcaster; Entertainer; Director; Actor
- Employers: MediaWorks; TVNZ
- Organizations: More FM; TVNZ
- Known for: What Now; Jase TV; The Son of a Gunn Show; Bumble; Dancing with the Stars; Wheel of Fortune; The Rich List; You're Back In The Room; Classic Hits; More FM; McDonald's Young Entertainers
- Spouse: Janine Morrell-Gunn
- Children: Louis Gunn, Faith Gunn, Eve Palmer (step daughter), Grace Palmer (step daughter)

Jason Kenneth Gunn (born 26 December 1968) is a New Zealand television and radio personality. He is known for The Son of a Gunn Show, What Now, Dancing with the Stars, Wheel of Fortune, and The Rich List, and also afternoon shows on radio stations Classic Hits and More FM.

== Career ==
Gunn said he learned many of his presenting skills in his first few months at Christchurch from the experienced children's TV crew and presenters around him. He hosted After School (1989) and co-hosted After 2 (1989–1991), The Son of a Gunn Show (1992–1995) and Jase TV (1992) with his sidekick Thingee, a grey puppet with bulbous eyes. Gunn and Thingee also starred in Jase and Thingee's Big Adventure, a straight-to-video kids movie based on The Son of a Gunn Show. Thingee infamously lost an eye during the filming of a Son of a Gunn episode. As the show was pre-recorded, the footage never made it to air until several years later when a late-night comedy programme ended up showing the infamous blooper scene.

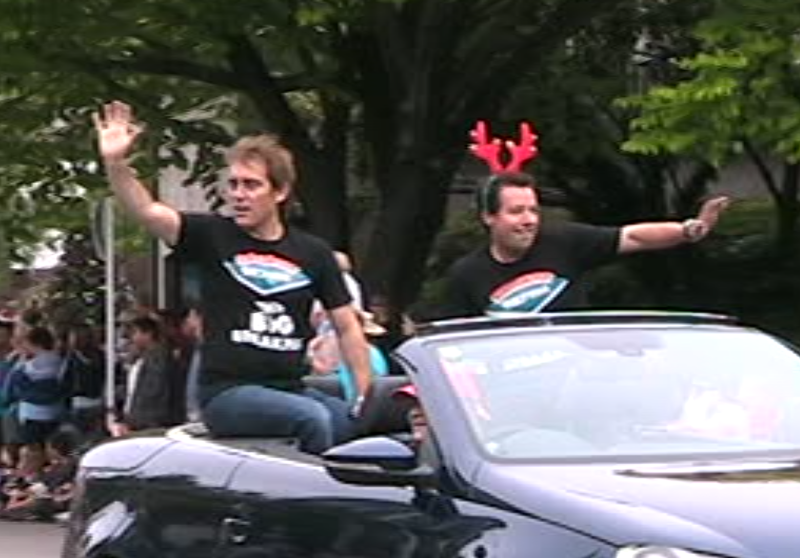
Gunn (left) and Fitzgerald at Smiths City Santa Parade 2009

Gunn became the co-host of the Classic Hits FM (later rebranded to "The Hits") breakfast show for Christchurch in 2009. In July 2012, he moved to a nationwide networked show with co-host Dave Fitzgerald. While other Classic Hits nationwide shows were broadcast from Auckland, the afternoon drive show "Jase and Dave" was broadcast from Christchurch. However, citing family reasons, he resigned from this position at the end of 2013 and broadcast his last show on 20 December 2013. He then joined More FM as an afternoon drive show host until 2019 when it was announced he was leaving the show to pursue his own business ventures. In August 2016, he was the host of the New Zealand version of the UK show You're Back In The Room.

A patron of the National Youth Theatre Company of New Zealand (NYTC), Gunn also runs a production and facilities company, WhitebaitMedia, in Christchurch with his wife, Janine Morrell-Gunn, for which he writes, directs and produces for television, including children's show What Now, and oversees the production of television commercials.

== Filmography ==
- Wheel of Fortune (2008–2009)
- Dancing with the Stars (2005–2009)
- Jessie.com (2001-2002)
- Bumble (2000), (2020–present)
- McDonald's Young Entertainers (1997–1999)
- New Zealand's Funniest Home Videos (1993–1995)
- The Son of a Gunn Show (1992–1995)
- Jase TV (1992)
- What Now (1991–1993) (2003–present as production manager, creative writer, and director)
- After School (1988)
- Small Talk
- After 2 (1989–1991)
- New Zealand Celebrity Treasure Island (2003)
- Look Who's Famous Now
- You're Back in The Room (2016)
- Super Saturday Vaxathon (2021)

== See also ==
- List of New Zealand television personalities
