= WhitebaitMedia =

New Zealand independent production company

WhitebaitMedia is a local independent New Zealand production company producing children's programmes. It was founded by Janine Morrell-Gunn in 1998.

== History ==
Morrell-Gunn worked as an executive producer for TVNZ's Children's Unit while it was based in Christchurch, New Zealand. When the Unit moved to Wellington's Avalon studios, in 1998, Morrell-Gunn remained in Christchurch to start her own company, Whitebait Productions.

Whitebait's first commission was Bumble, a preschool series about a bee and his friends. The first actor to wear the Bumble suit was her husband, Jason Gunn. Whitebait Productions has also produced the Jessie.com series for TVNZ (which sold to Disney Australia, and English programmes for Japan), the interactive pop talent quest Wannabes for Three, and the series Tuhono, a youth hip-hop show, for Māori Television. The show Animal Academy was produced by Whitebait also for TVNZ and is screened regularly on TVNZ 2.

Whitebait Productions has produced What Now? since the shows relaunch.

In April 2009, Whitebait's newest show The Erin Simpson Show came on air. The show was originally planned as a three-year series, the show went from strength to strength securing an additional two years of New Zealand on Air funding. On 6 December 2013, The Erin Simpson Show aired its last, 770th, episode.

WhitebaitMedia was formerly Whitebait-TV, before a rebrand in 2015. The name was changed to reflect the growing need for content outside of the TV screen, including mobile and web content to complement the broadcast programming.

== Shows ==
The list below is all of the productions and shows created by WhitebaitMedia:

- Jessie.com (2001-2002)
- Wannabes (2002-2005)
- Bumble (1999-2002),
- What Now? (2009–present)
- Tuhono (2004)
- The Erin Simpson Show (2009-2013)
- Animal Academy
- The 4:30 Show (2014-2015)
- The Adam and Eve Show (2016-2017)
- 2Kaha
- Fanimals (2018-2019)
- Darwin and Newts (2018–present)
- Brain Busters (2020–present)
- The Feed (2022 -2023)
