= Jase TV =

New Zealand children's television series

Jase TV is a short-lived New Zealand children's television show in which hosts Jason Gunn and puppet Thingee introduced cartoons. It aired on TVNZ in 1992 and eventually led into The Son of a Gunn Show.

== Programmes ==
- Anytime Tales
- Brum
- Charlie Chalk
- Fiddley Foodle Bird
- Fireman Sam
- Hot Dog
- Jim Henson's Mother Goose Stories
- Joshua Jones
- Just So Stories
- King Rollo
- Kitty Cats
- Nellie the Elephant
- Noddy's Toyland Adventures
- Play School
- Poddington Peas
- Postman Pat
- Puddle Lane
- Rainbow
- The Ratties
- Roger Ramjet
- Rupert
- The Smoggies
- The Sooty Show
- Spider!
- Spot
- SuperTed
- T-Bag
- Thomas the Tank Engine & Friends
- Topsy and Tim
- Towser
- Truckers
- Zoo Olympics
