= Olly Ohlson =

New Zealand television personality

- Born: New Zealand
- Occupations: Broadcaster; Entertainer

Olly Ohlson is a New Zealand television personality. He was the first presenter for After School, hosting the show from 1981 to 1986. Of Ngāti Whare descent, Ohlson was a pioneer in bringing the Māori language and sign language onto television. He won the Best New Talent award at the 1982 New Zealand Feltex Awards.

== See also ==
- List of New Zealand television personalities
