= DIY Rescue =

- Country of origin: Australia
- No. of episodes: 13

Original release
- Network: Nine Network
- Release: 12 August 2003

DIY Rescue is a home renovation television series which screened on the Nine Network in 2003. It was loosely based on the British television series DIY SOS.

DIY Rescue was hosted by Leah McLeod and featured the builder Luke Van Dyk, the landscape gardener Greg Norton, and the interior designer Tara Dennis.

== History ==
DIY Rescue grew from 1.29 million viewers to 1.49 at the end of August 2003. The Weekend Australian hypothesised that the audience was shifting to DIY Rescue from Network 10's Tuesday sitcom lineup rather than rival lifestyle programming. When measured against the previous week, the number of people who had watched the Network 10 shows Everybody Loves Raymond and Becker had dropped. By early November 2003, the show had an average national audience of 1.3 million.

== Reception ==
Daniel Hoy wrote that the series "must resort to scraping the bottom of the barrel and rewarding those too lazy to do anything for themselves, let alone the community at large". In a review of one episode, Rebecca Whitfeild called it "touching, albeit sappy".
