= Steve Parr (broadcaster) =

New Zealand radio and TV host (born 1955)

- Born: 1955 (age 70–71); New Zealand
- Occupations: Television presenter, radio announcer, real estate agent

Stephen James Parr (born December 6 1955) is a New Zealand–based former television and radio personality. He was the host of the children's TV show What Now and the New Zealand version of the game show Sale of the Century.

== Career ==
=== Early career ===
Parr began his broadcasting career in radio before transitioning to television. In 1981, he became the first host of the Saturday morning children's show What Now, introducing segments such as morning keep-fit exercises, recurring sketches like Clive Grumble, trivia from Frank Flash, and law-and-safety tips with Constable Keith and Sniff, interspersed with animated cartoons.

=== Sale of the Century ===
In 1989, Parr moved to hosting the New Zealand edition of the game show Sale of the Century, alongside Jude Dobson and later former NZ supermodel Julie White. He developed the "Steve Parr Slide" — a run-up and slide behind the hosting desk to give the show more energy. The slide inspired the name of a band.

In October 2020, Tara Ward of The Spinoff published a retrospective ranking of Parr's ten greatest "Steve Parr Slides".
