= Spot On (TV programme) =

- Genre: Children's entertainment
- Created by: Murray Hutchinson
- Opening theme: "Blue Boy" by Jan Akkerman
- Country of origin: New Zealand
- Original language: English

Production
- Producers: Murray Hutchinson; Michael Stedman; Huntly Eliott; Judith Thomas; Ian Garner
- Camera setup: Multi-Camera
- Running time: 30 minutes

Original release
- Network: TV One (1974–1986); TV2 (1987–1988)
- Release: 4 February 1974 – 25 December 1988

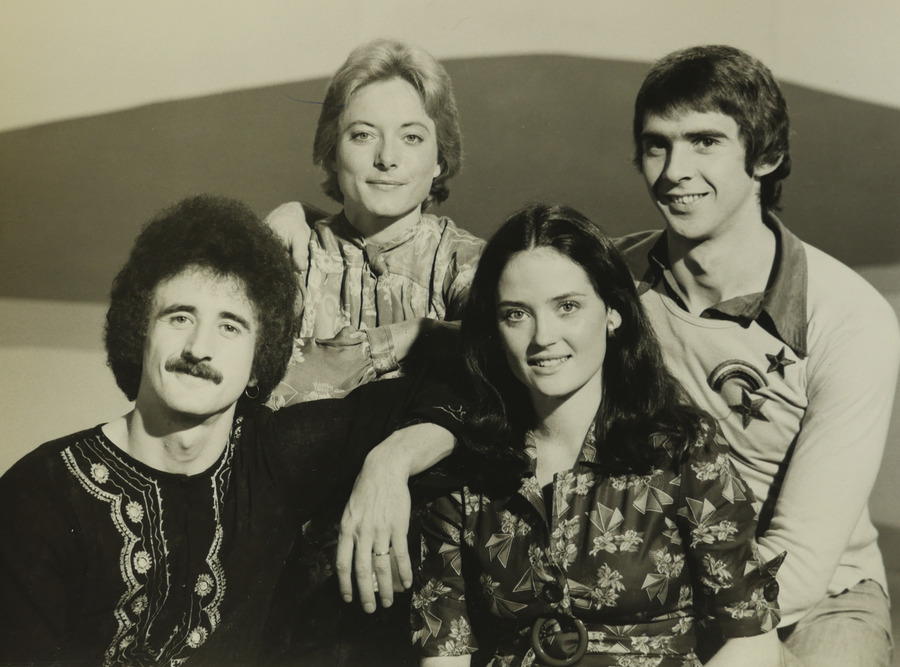
Original Spot On presenters, from left: Ray Millard, Evelyn Skinner, Erin Roozendaal, Douglas Blair

Spot On is a New Zealand children's television programme that aired from 1974 to 1988. The format was a weekly programme with three or four presenters, based on the format of the British programme Blue Peter where they would introduce their young audience to experiences they might not be familiar with: going out in the field and participating in jobs, events, or sports, to learn what is involved. Examples included fire-fighting, flying in rescue helicopters, visiting a chocolate factory, rock climbing and abseiling, or travelling to other countries. Studio-bound sketches and interviews filled out the half-hour show.

The original opening titles were animated by Dunedin artist and cartoonist John Noakes and the logo for the series was a cartoon furry dog (with the title hand-drawn in a bubble typeface inside a large black spot on the dog's left side). This stylised image was used in variations of the Spot On opening titles from 1974 through to 1982. From 1983 onwards the dog mascot was no longer used and instead the logo typeface was changed to a Blippo Black font with an archery target incorporated as the 'O' in 'Spot'.

Over the years the show also encouraged its young viewers to submit entries for various Spot On competitions that covered a wide range of creative topics, such as poster art, photography, scriptwriting, and textile design. Spot On's annual filmmaking contests also attracted entries from emerging talents like Peter Jackson, Paul Middleditch, and Robert Sarkies.

Commonly one presenter was replaced each year. The programme was produced by TVNZ at their Dunedin studios, except for the final two seasons which were produced at the TVNZ Studio 4 facility in Christchurch.

== Presenters ==
- Ray Millard, 1974–1976
- Erin Dunleavy (Roozendaal), 1974–1977
- Douglas Blair, 1974–1976
- Evelyn Skinner, 1974–1975
- Ian Taylor, 1976–1979
- Danny Watson, 1977–1983
- Margaret Rishworth (Campbell), 1977–1980
- Marcus Turner, 1979–1983
- Helen McGowan, 1981–1985 (with an appearance in the first programme for 1986)
- Sandy Beverley, 1982–1987 (including a couple of items as a reporter in 1988)
- Peta Carey, 1984
- Ole Maiava, 1985–1988
- Wendy Nuzum, 1986
- Josie McNee, 1987 (including a couple of items as a reporter in 1988)
- Phil Keoghan, 1988
- Amber Cunliffe, 1988

== Producers ==
- Murray Hutchinson
- Michael Stedman
- Huntly Eliott
- Judith Thomas
- Ian Garner

== Publications ==
The Spot On Book was published in 1987 by TVNZ Publishing, edited by Frances Weston.
