= Face the Music (New Zealand game show) =

- Created by: David Levy; Buddy Piper-Beverly Piper
- Developed by: Buddy Piper
- Presented by: Simon Barnett
- Country of origin: New Zealand

Production
- Producer: Sandy Frank
- Running time: 30 minutes
- Production company: Sandy Frank Productions

Original release
- Network: TV2
- Release: 1992 – 1994

Face the Music is a weekly game show from New Zealand that aired on TV2 from 1992 to 1994, hosted by TV presenter Simon Barnett, along with Dwayne Francks as co-host. Jeoff Barraclough was the announcer as well as music coordinator.

== Round 1 ==
Three contestants competed per episode, one a returning champion. In round 1, four categories were presented to the players, each containing four notes, with each note ranging from 50 to 100 points (in 5-point increments). A song was played, and the first contestant to buzz-in and identify the song got the points. A wrong answer meant the player was out for the next song, though, and the other two could guess. Occasionally, they would answer a question related to the song rather than trying to guess the song itself. Some notes had a bonus question attached—if answered correctly, the player could double the value by correctly answering a question related to the song or the artist.

== Round 2 ==
In this round, Barnett was joined by Francks, and the contestants played a round similar to Name That Tune's Bid-a-Note round (in fact, this show was licensed by Sandy Frank), though done differently. Barnett read a clue, and Francks played four notes related to the song. Up to three clues were asked (with an additional four notes for each clue), with the starting value at 100 points, and the value being cut in half for each additional clue (50 on the second, 25 on the third). Five songs were played in this round.

== Round 3 ==
The third and final round was played like the first, except the notes did not have an assigned value. The value started at 100 points, and every second added five points until someone rang in with the right answer. Just like in round 1, some notes had a bonus question attached worth double the value. When the round was over, the player with the highest score won the game and returned on the next program. If there was a tie for first place between two players or if all three tied, one last song was played, and the first to buzz-in got to answer, and if correct, won the game.

== Bonus round ==
The evening's champion played the bonus round, identical to NTT's Golden Medley, for a major prize, usually a stereo system or a trip. There were some differences though; towards the end the contestant had to identify six tunes (rather than seven, to begin with they had to identify seven as in Golden Medley) in 30 seconds, still by hitting a buzzer to stop the clock and identify the song, and giving a wrong answer did not end the game, although the contestant could still hit the buzzer and say "pass" to move on to the next song if unsure. If all six were guessed correctly in the 30 seconds, he or she won the major prize.
