= What Now (TV programme) =

- Genre: Children's entertainment
- Created by: Rex Simpson
- Presented by: Aashma Goldfarb; Imy Rice; Manu Hepi; Rahil Uddin
- Opening theme: What Now 2024
- Country of origin: New Zealand

Production
- Producer: Whitebait Productions
- Camera setup: Multi-Camera
- Running time: 60 minutes

Original release
- Network: TV One (1981–1989); TVNZ 2 (1989–present)
- Release: May 9, 1981 – present

What Now is a New Zealand children's television programme that premiered on Saturday 9 May 1981.

The show airs every Sunday at 8.30 am on TVNZ 2 and has segments such as Turtle Town, Fancy Feeds, and Gaming with Grandpa. It has no adverts, due to the Broadcasting Act 1989 which states that no commercial advertising can be shown on New Zealand television between 6 am and noon on Sundays.

== History ==
What Now (alternatively titled as What Now? or WN) was created in 1981 by TVNZ producer Rex Simpson before he left the state broadcaster in 1988 to set up a children's department for then upcoming new channel, TV3.

The show was originally half an hour in duration and screened on Saturday mornings on TVNZ 1 between 10 and 10.30am. The original cast in the first year were Steve Hooper along with four children, Merryn Pugh, Richard Hillock, Oliver Huggins and Lucy Briant (and Murdoch the dog). According to Rex Simpson at the time the "whole idea of the programme [was] to create healthy leisure attitudes" and followed on from the template set by his previous children's show, How's That?, of introducing children to fun and educational activities (and which had been hosted by Stu Dennison the previous year in 1980). For their scripted scenes Steve and the children would interact in a clubhouse set (recorded in TVNZ's Christchurch studio), and these would be interspersed with externally-filmed games and activity ideas, or skits by comedic character Murray Slack (portrayed by comedian Jon Gadsby in 1981, and then the next year by actor Tony Wahren).

For the 1982 series Lucy Briant and Oliver Huggins were retained as part of the cast but five new children were introduced - Carol Hoy, Jeffrey White, Debbie Matoe, Scott Flanagan and Adrian Sexton. Other segments were also added to the format such as illustrated comic book character Captain Leisure (drawn by artist Ashley Smith), and a "New Games Competition" co-presented by Peter Williams and Yvonne Moore.

In 1983 the programme format was revamped again and new solo presenter Steve Parr was brought in to anchor the show, with the timeslot shifting to 8.25-9.30am. While sitting behind a studio desk Steve Parr introduced segments covering morning keep-fit exercises, sketches involving recurring characters such as complaining old man Clive Grumble (portrayed by Jim Hopkins), simple recipes by Alison Holst, trivia from Frank Flash (Alasdair Kincaid), law and safety with Constable Keith and Sniff (a puppet police dog), nationwide talent quest "Starbound", and a serialised interactive detective series called "The Retrievers", interspersed with regular cartoons. The opening theme song used for the show from the mid-1980s to early 1990s was Get Out of Your Lazy Bed, by Matt Bianco.

In 1984 the timeslot again changed from 8.30–10am, and then in July 1985 onwards increased to a whole two hours duration, screening from 8-10am. When Steve Parr left the show at the end of 1984, after two years as the main presenter, the number of hosts also increased, usually to three, beginning with Danny Watson (from Spot On) joining in April 1985. Michelle Bracey, who had been part of show segments the year before in 1984, became a more prominent co-presenter and Frank Flash was given a central comedic manic role. When Michelle left the show, she was succeeded by Michèle A'Court in April 1987.

During the Steve Parr years onwards the show changed from being pre-recorded to live broadcast, and comedy sketches, interactive phone calls and competitions with the viewing audience, plus magazine-style segments going out and about, all became a more central part of the format. The style remained this way for many years, as hosts evolved and were replaced, until today where the format now involves live audiences of crowds of children, but still is closely faithful with the core concept established early on.

In November 1989 the show moved channels to TVNZ 2 and then in 1996 began screening on Sunday mornings. An after school version of What Now, What Now PM, also ran on TVNZ 2 during the week, between 1997 and 2002.

The weekdays version of What Now became its own separate show known as WNTV(standing for What Now TV). First hosted by Carolyn Taylor and a face in a computer screen played by Mikey Carpenter. Later the show changed dramatically, but kept the same WNTV name. It became a drama showing behind the scenes of a children's afternoon magazine show. This was hosted by Antonia Prebble and Tom Hern, and featured several other characters. Anna Allbury and Jo Tuapawa featured as reporters.

The What Now show was moved to TVNZ's Avalon studios in Lower Hutt in 1999 until TVNZ shut down its Children's Department at the end of 2003. What Now the show was then brought back to Christchurch in 2004 to be produced by an independent company Whitebait Productions, headed by Janine Morrell-Gunn and Jason Gunn. What Now has been funded by NZ On Air since NZOA's inception in 1989; prior to that it was funded by TVNZ.

In 2004 the afternoon show WNTV was cancelled and replaced with the old children's afternoon TV show Studio 2 produced by Ian Taylor and Taylormade Productions. Although Taylormade was based in Dunedin, Studio 2 was produced live to air at TVNZ's Auckland studios.

In 2024 What Now halted its live studio production for the first time in its history. The show announced itself as "digital first" with the aim of growing its YouTube subscriber base to reflect the shift in viewing habits of its young audience. 2024 also saw the return of Chris Kirk as host and the relocation of WhitebaitMedia from its modest Princess Street studios in Addington to a smaller production base in downtown Christchurch.

What Now has a long-standing association with the Weet-Bix Kiwi Kids Tryathlon, and with Sport and Recreation New Zealand whose 'Push Play' message encourages children to be physically active.

Early What Now presenters were also credited as writers. They were people like Michele A'Court, Danny Watson, Al Kincaid, Michelle Bracey, Simon Barnett and Catherine McPherson, some of whom have gone on to roles as directors and writers. A more recent presenter who made a significant behind-the-scenes contribution was Anthony Samuels, who also trained as a director.

Off-screen personnel who have shaped What Now over the years are many. They include camera operator and director Alan Henderson (also the brains behind Jason Gunn's sidekick Thingee), Directors Keith Tyler-Smith, Bill de Friez, Peter Verstappen, Mike Rehu, Brian Wickstead, Mark Owers, Mike Ritchie, Jason Gunn, Richard Hansen, Matt Barrett, Kerry DuPont, Kingsley Hockley, Chester Travis, Shardey Harris, and Tom Eason. Producers include Richard Driver, Mike Rehu, Tony Palmer, Anne Williams, Emma Martini(Gribble), Reuben Davidson, Jo Eade, Adam Percival, Holly Chappell and Executive Producer Janine Morrell-Gunn.

== Current presenters ==
Host	Duration
Imogen Rice	2025–Present
Aashma Goldfarb	2025–Present
Rahil Uddin	2025–Present
Manu Hepi	2025–Present

== Previous hosts and segment presenters ==
- Steve Hooper 1981 (along with intermediate school-aged children Merryn, Richard, Oliver and Lucy)
- Peter Williams and Yvonne Moore 1982 (just for the New Games Competition segment)
- Steve Parr 1983–1984
- Jim Hopkins 1983–1987 (as Clive Grumble character)
- Alasdair Kincaid (as Frank Flash character) 1983–1988 and then returned as The Answer Guy in the 1990s
- Michelle Bracey 1983–1987 (various segments and then as one of the main presenters)
- Eddie Sunderland 1984–1992 (arts and crafts segments). Eddie died in 1993 and was replaced by his brother Henry Sunderland. The duo also released two spin-off project books based on What Now projects entitled Eddie's Home Made Fun and More Eddie's Home Made Fun
- Danny Watson 1985–1987
- Michele A'Court 1987–1988
- Fifi Colston 1987–1993 (arts and crafts segments)
- Steven Zanoski 1988
- Catherine McPherson 1988–1992
- Simon Barnett 1988–1992
- Carlos Miller 1989–1990 (for the "Let's Cook" cooking segment)
- Thingee 1989–1997 (puppet who also co-hosted The Son of a Gunn Show and Chatterbox)
- Jason Gunn reoccurring guest/presenter since the early 1990s (and also creative writer and producer from the 2000s onwards)
- Aaron Devitt 1993–1994
- Darren Young 1994
- Fiona Anderson 1994–1997
- Stacey Morrison (Daniels) 1995–1997 (in a cooking segment)
- Steve Joll 1996–1998
- Mike Carpenter (as the character Props Boy) 1996–2000
- Anthony Samuels 1995–2003
- Jason Fa'afoi 1997–2004
- Shavaughn Ruakere 1997–2001
- Carolyn Taylor 1999–2004, 2005–2006 and on WNTV (2008)
- Tāmati Coffey 2004–2007
- Vicki Lin 2005
- Charlie Panapa 2005–2011
- Virginie Le Brun 2005–2006
- Serena Cooper 2006–4 July 2010
- Camilla the Gorilla 2006–2013
- Red the Mailbot 2008–2012
- Gemma (Gem) Easton (née Knight) 2010–2015
- Johnson Raela 2011–2012
- Adam Percival 2011–2015 (He was a host in The 4:30 Show that was replaced by The Adam and Eve Show before he left. He later returned to What Now as a Content Producer in 2020 and was a Creative Producer in 2021.)
- Ronnie Taulafo 2011–2018
- Chris Kirk 2015-2020, 2024-2025
- Bianca Seinafo 2015–2016
- Erin Wells 2018–2023
- Evander Brown 2019
- Stella Maris 2020-2023
- Joseph Coughlan 2021
- Trubie-Dylan Smith 2023
- Luke Tumaru (Funge HQ Presenter)

== Regular segments (past and present) ==
- Little Gigs
- Turtle Town
- Fancy Feeds
- Gaming with Grandparents
- Serial Stuff - Serial comedy/drama, with outdoor scenes realised in Chuckimation style. Late 1990s - early 2000s (Redone in 2021)
- Celebrity Traffic Island - Satirical take-off of Celebrity Treasure Island. Written by Andy Gunn - Jason Gunn's brother.
- Pie-in-Yer-Ear House - Satirical take-off of Pioneer House. Also written by Andy Gunn.
- Game Zone
- The One
- SLAM!
- Toilet Humour - The first locally produced lip-sync CGI animated series.
- Foul's Kitchen
- Stars in Disguise
- Balls of Fortune
- Splat Cave
- Live in Your Living Room
- Fairytales Got Talent
- LOL
- Wobblies - Satirical take-off of children's music group The Wiggles.
- Phone and Away - Based on Home and Away.
- Tamariki Titans
- Emoji Dojo
- Up Nose and Personal
- Doodlezone
- Birthdays
- Show Us Your Room
- WN Wild Ride
- What Now Vivor - Based on Survivor (TV series)
- Kidtubers
- Mysteryville
- Hoover Hover
- DareDevil Levels
- Win A Wish
- Smoothie of the Week
- Animal Antics
- How Will It Travel?
- Best Town Ever
- Target Your Teacher
- The Gunge Runner
- Ice Ice Bobbing

== Gunge ==
Throughout the years, What Now has maintained the use of gunge and foam. Children, celebrities, parents and sometimes the presenters are often the subject of embarrassment in various gunge games. Examples include Happy Feet, Gunge Matters, Target your Teacher and Tug of War and general gunging.

In 2024, What Now performed its most extreme gunging ever, dropping over 375 litres of gunge from a helicopter onto its host.
