= Wheel of Fortune (New Zealand game show) =

- Genre: Game show
- Based on: Wheel of Fortune by Merv Griffin
- Presented by: Phillip Leishman; Simon Barnett; Lana Coc-Kroft; Jason Gunn; Sonia Gray
- Announcer: Grant Walker
- Country of origin: New Zealand
- Original language: English
- No. of seasons: 8

Production
- Running time: 24 minutes

Original release
- Network: TV2
- Release: 11 February 1991 – 24 May 1996
- Network: TV ONE
- Release: 14 April 2008 – 2 May 2009

Wheel of Fortune is a New Zealand television game show that was last hosted by Jason Gunn and co-host Sonia Gray. It was broadcast on TV2 from 1991 to 1996 and on TV ONE from 2008 to 2009. It is based on the American game show of the same name.

== History ==
=== 1991–1996 original ===
The original New Zealand version of the popular American game show Wheel of Fortune was first broadcast in February 1991, on TVNZ channel TV2, at 5:30pm. The show, which was heavily modeled after Australia's version, was originally hosted by Phillip Leishman with co-host Lana Coc-Kroft, along with Grant Walker (also doing New Zealand's version of Sale of the Century at the time) as announcer. Simon Barnett became the new host in March 1996. During its time the show aired on various time slots and switched between TV ONE and TV2; at the show's peak it aired in prime time on TV ONE at 7:00pm, a time slot previously used to screen Sale of the Century, but moved off this slot in 1995 when TV ONE extended their news to a one-hour show followed by Holmes. After moving to TV2 in a 6:00pm time slot the show was ultimately axed in May 1996 as the show could not compete with the 6pm news shows on TV ONE and TV3.

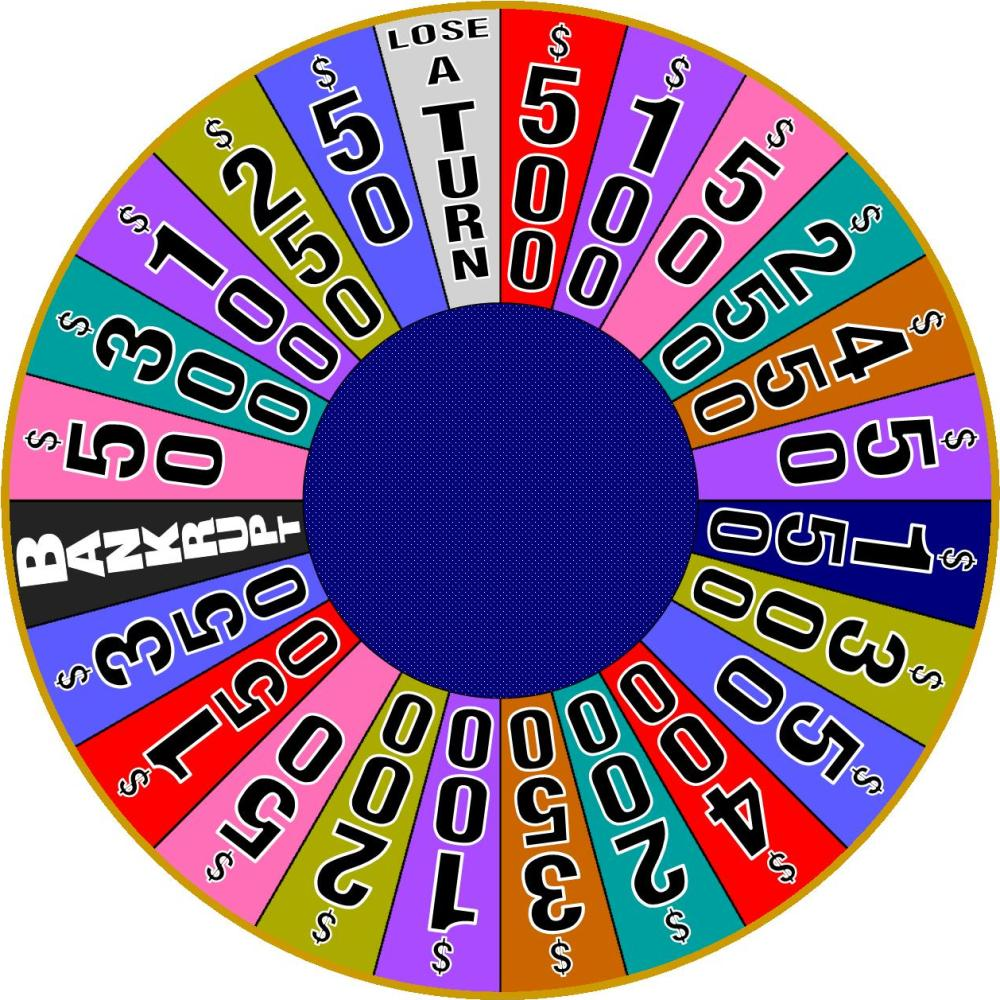
A recreation of the wheel used in New Zealand from 2008–2009. Note the similarity of the color scheme that was used on America's version from 2006–2008.

=== 2008–2009 return ===
On 14 April 2008 the New Zealand version of Wheel of Fortune returned again to TVNZ channel TV ONE. The show returned with new hosts Jason Gunn and Sonia Gray. The show now airs at 5:30 pm local time. At the conclusion of the filming of the 2008 season, TVNZ announced the show will return in 2009 bigger and better. Additionally, Jason Gunn officially announced that his co-host Sonia Gray was pregnant with twins and that she would return to co-host the show after her pregnancy. Greer Robson temporarily took Gray's role on the show until she returned on 2 May 2009.

It was announced on 2 May 2009 that the series was being cancelled after only one year on air. The reasons given by TVNZ for the cancellation were lower ratings than the previous season, decreased advertising revenue and the high cost of producing the show. Lower ratings may have resulted after the reformatting of the show interrupted its flow due to an increased emphasis on 'Speed Digits'. The last show was screened on 2 May 2009.

== David Tua incident ==
One notable episode which appears from time to time in blooper specials was boxer David Tua's game on October 10, 1992: at one point, he asked for P when buying a vowel; at another, he tried to buy a consonant. He was also believed to have tried to call "O for awesome" which went on to become a famous quotable saying in New Zealand, although the main problem was that he was supposed to call a consonant.

== The Wheel of Avalon ==
In 2025, an artist named Bronwyn Holloway-Smith did a reimaging artwork of the 1991-1996 set (minus the puzzleboard) where its prize wheel has wedges such as "Aroha", "Empathy" and "Belonging". Its located at The Dowse Art Museum in Lower Hutt, New Zealand.

== Link ==
Official Website of the 2008 version
