= The Son of a Gunn Show =

The Son of a Gunn Show is a New Zealand after-school, children's television show, hosted by Jason Gunn, that aired on TVNZ from 1992, to the final episode in 1995. It was produced in the Christchurch TVNZ Building and finished when the production of children's programmes was moved to Wellington.

The show was co-hosted by his sidekick Thingee, a grey puppet with bulbous eyes. The character was played by Alan Henderson.

Regular features included parodies of television and films (co-written with Andrew Gunn), Jason in character as "Mum Gunn", games such as Send A Gorilla, a weekly segment with Christchurch magician Elgregoe, Te Reo with Ruawhitu Pokaia and interviews and songs with NZ celebrities.

A home video called Jason & Thingee's Big Adventure was released which featured a linking narrative of the duo stumbling upon a stolen "rare and priceless moa egg", with memorable clips from the television show.

== Programmes ==
- The Adventures of T-Rex
- Blinky Bill
- Inspector Gadget
- Mel’s Amazing Movies
- The Mr. Bogus Show
- Muppet Babies
- Pete and Penny - Keeping Ourselves Safe (Australian special on children being vigilant around strangers)
- Rollaball
- Scooby-Doo, Where are You?
- The Smoggies
- Twinkle, the Dream Being
- Victor and Hugo
- Widget the World Watcher

== See also ==
- After School
- What Now
- Jase TV
