= 1995 in New Zealand television =

List of years in New Zealand television
- … 1985; 1986; 1987; 1988; 1989; 1990; 1991; 1992; 1993; 1994; 1995; 1996; 1997; 1998; 1999; 2000; 2001; 2002; 2003; 2004; 2005 …
- Art; Archaeology; Architecture; Literature; Music; Philosophy; Science; +...

This is a list of New Zealand television events and premieres that occurred in 1995, the 36th year of continuous operation of television in New Zealand.

== Events ==
- 4 February - Channel 2 changes its name back to TV2.
- 23 February – US sitcom Friends begins on TV2.
- One Network News extended from 30 minutes to 60 minutes and Holmes moves to 7:00pm.
- TV One and TV3 commenced their 24-hour transmissions, 7 days a week.
- The popular children's storybook series Hairy Maclary has been spawned into a short lived 5 minute animated television series. Running for only 10 episodes, the series will premiere on TV2.
- Children's programmes return to broadcasting on TV One.

== Debuts ==
=== Domestic ===
- 15 May - White Fang (TV One) (also France and Canada)
- 31 December – Riding High (TV2) (1995-1996)
- Hercules: The Legendary Journeys (Channel 2) (also United States) (1995–1999)
- Mirror, Mirror (TV2) (also on Network Ten Australia) (1995)
- Hairy Maclary (TV2) (1995)

=== International ===
- 19 February – (United States) Stand by Your Man (Channel 2)
- 21 February – (United Kingdom) Pie in the Sky (TV One)
- 23 February – (United States) Friends (TV2)
- 4 March – (United States) / (Australia) Time Trax (TV2)
- 4 March – (Australia) The Big Byte (TV2)
- 6 March – (United States) ER (TV2)
- 18 April – (United Kingdom) Luv (TV One)
- 30 April – (United States) Frannie's Turn (TV2)
- 6 May – (Australia) Gladiators (TV2)
- 5 June – (United States) Animaniacs (TV2)
- 8 June – (United States) Chicago Hope (TV2)
- 8 June – (United States) / (Canada) Due South (TV2)
- 20 June – (United Kingdom) The Tomorrow People (1992) (TV One)
- 6 July – (United Kingdom) The Knock (TV One)
- 7 July – (United Kingdom) The Unpleasant World of Penn & Teller (TV2)
- 20 July – (United States) Ellen (TV3)
- 24 July – (United States) Texas Justice (TV2)
- 6 August – (United Kingdom) Avenger Penguins (TV2)
- 7 August – (United States) Aladdin (TV3)
- 18 December – (United States) The Gordon Elliott Show (TV3)
- 18 December – (United Kingdom) Postman Pat and the Tuba (TV One)
- 25 December – (United Kingdom) Mole's Christmas (TV2)
- 30 December – (United States) Touched By An Angel (TV3)
- 31 December – (United States) Flipper (1995) (TV2)
- (United States) Where on Earth Is Carmen Sandiego? (TV2)
- (United States) Party of Five (TV2)
- (United States) The Tick (TV2)
- (United States) The George Carlin Show (TV2)

== Changes to network affiliation ==
This is a list of programs which made their premiere on a New Zealand television network that had previously premiered on another New Zealand television network. The networks involved in the switch of allegiances are predominantly both free-to-air networks or both subscription television networks. Programs that have their free-to-air/subscription television premiere, after previously premiering on the opposite platform (free-to air to subscription/subscription to free-to air) are not included. In some cases, programs may still air on the original television network. This occurs predominantly with programs shared between subscription television networks.

=== Domestic ===
Program	New network(s)	Previous network(s)	Date
Deepwater Haven (also France and Canada)	TV One	TV2	27 December

=== International ===
Program	New network(s)	Previous network(s)	Date
(United Kingdom) Toucan Tecs	TV One	TV2	9 January
(Australia) Bananas in Pyjamas	TV One	TV2	8 February
(United Kingdom) The Greedysaurus Gang	TV One	TV2	14 April
(Canada) / (France) Kitty Cats	TV One	TV2	17 April
(United Kingdom) Thomas the Tank Engine & Friends	TV One	TV2	29 June
(United Kingdom) Postman Pat	TV One	TV2	20 July
(United States) We All Have Tales	TV One	TV2	25 July
(United Kingdom) Noddy's Toyland Adventures	TV One	TV2	14 August
(United Kingdom) Noddy and Father Christmas	TV One	TV2	25 December

== Television shows ==
- What Now (1981–present)
- Letter to Blanchy (1989, 1994–1997)
- New Zealand's Funniest Home Videos (1990–1995)
- 60 Minutes (1990–present)
- Wheel of Fortune (1991–1996)
- Shortland Street (1992–present)
- You and Me (1993–1998)
- Melody Rules (1993–1995)

== Ending this year ==
- Melody Rules (TV3) (1993–1995)
- New Zealand's Funniest Home Videos (TV2) (1990–1995)
- The Son of a Gunn Show (TV2) (1992–1995)
- Hairy Maclary (TV2) (1995)
