= 1990 in New Zealand television =

This is a list of New Zealand television events and premieres that occurred in 1990, the 31st year of continuous operation of television in New Zealand.

== Events ==
- 1 January – Welcome 1990 Haere Mai was broadcast on TV One. It marked the beginning of 24 hours of special, all-New Zealand TV programming and began with New Zealand feature films and excerpts from past television programmes. A three-hour entertainment special to celebrate 1990 was broadcast live from Bastion Point on TV One at 7.30pm that night.
- 17 January – The final episode of Gloss was broadcast on Channel 2 at 7.30pm.
- 24 January – The 1990 Commonwealth Games opened and TV One had live coverage.
- 9 February – The final weekday edition of The Early Bird Show was broadcast on TV3. The Early Bird Show was transferred to Saturday and Sunday mornings from 17 February onwards.
- 10 February – The New Zealand version of Treasure Hunt, based on the format of the French game show La Chasse au Trésor, premiered on TV One and screened Saturdays at 6.30pm, with Raylene Ramsay as studio host and Nick Tansley as direct skyrunner.
- 12 February – TV3's weekday transmission commenced at midday and all morning programming was dropped. The Oprah Winfrey Show premiered on TV3, as did the US soaps The Bold and the Beautiful and Another World. Nightline, as the late night edition of 3 National News, debuted and screened at 10.30pm.
- 16 February – RTR New Releases premiered on Channel 2. Screening Fridays at 4.30pm, RTR New Releases was the newest addition to the RTR portfolio (which included RTR Countdown and RTR Megamix) and devoted to 'the hottest of the week's new music releases' in a non-stop, video clip-based format. It later moved to 4.20pm as part of Friday's 3.45 Live!.
- 16 February – A Current Affair was dropped by TV3 due to poor ratings and strong competition from Holmes on TV One.
- 17 February - Channel 2 weekend morning programmes starts at 6.30am running seven days a week.
- 19 February – Programmes for North and South Island viewers commenced on TV One and screened weeknights as lead-ins to One Network News at 6pm. North Island viewers received Te Karere at 5.20pm and a sitcom rerun (i.e. M*A*S*H, WKRP in Cincinnati and George & Mildred during much of 1990) at 5.30pm. South Island viewers received a Bugs Bunny cartoon at 5.20pm, followed by a delayed broadcast of Te Karere (at 5.35pm), then The Mainland Touch (Christchurch) or The South Tonight (Dunedin) at 5.45pm.
- 19 February – Australian soap Home and Away moved from two double episodes a week (Tuesdays and Wednesdays at 7.30-8.30pm) to five half hour episodes a week (Monday to Friday evenings) at 6pm. 3 National News moved from 6pm to 6.30pm, but the weekend edition remained at 6pm.
- 10 March – Sounz!, which began in November 1989, was added to the RTR portfolio and renamed RTR Sounz!. Hosted by Robert Rakete, RTR Sounz! was a blend of 'the hottest music video releases, instant phone-and-win prizes and live acts' and screened Saturdays at 10am on Channel 2 (straight after What Now).
- 12 March – 3.45 Live! returned to Channel 2 with two new hosts, Hine Elder and Phil Keoghan.
- 23 March – Australian science and technology programme Beyond 2000 premiered on Channel 2 and screened Fridays at 8.30pm.
- 25 March – 60 Minutes resumed on TV3 and screened Sundays at 7.30pm. The programme was dropped earlier this year and its resources was transferred to A Current Affair before being dropped altogether, leaving the network with no regular current affairs programme.
- 13 April - The popular French children's cartoon Bouli made its New Zealand television debut on Channel 2.
- 14 April – Top Town screened on Channel 2 at 7pm in one hour-long highlights package.
- 14 April – The Early Bird Show changed its name to EBS.
- 14 April – The weekend edition of 3 National News moved to 5.45pm and was reduced in duration to 15 minutes. Home and Away extended to seven nights a week at 6pm.
- 16 April – Thomas the Tank Engine began screening on TV3; it was shown weekdays at 3.20pm.
- 21 April – The 1990 Top Town Final screened on Channel 2 at 7pm and acted as the final episode of Top Town. The series was revived by TVNZ in 2009.
- 29 April – Marae, a block of Māori and Pacific Island programming, premiered on Channel 2 and screened Sundays from 10am–12pm during 1990. Each edition of Marae began with the archival documentary series Waka Huia at 10.05am and the Pacific news magazine Tagata Pasifika at around 11.05am. Panui ("The Word"), a media commentary segment, followed at around 11.28am and the last 25 minutes, from 11.35am, would be devoted to other programmes from TVNZ's Māori department: Pounamu (a docudrama series on seven leaders of Māoridom), Whakairo (a seven-part series which examined both contemporary and traditional Māori art), When the Haka Became Boogie (a seven-part series on Māori entertainers, musicians and artists), Revival (another opportunity to see past Koha programmes) and highlights from the 1990 National Aotearoa Cultural Festival at Waitangi.
- 29 April – A controversial Frontline documentary called For the Public Good was broadcast on TV One at 6.30pm. It explored the relationship between business and the Labour Government. The screening of the documentary led to a complaint from the New Zealand Business Roundtable and Treasury and an order for TVNZ to broadcast a correction and apology and to refrain from broadcasting advertising programmes via TV One from 6pm until closedown on the evening of Sunday 3 February 1991.
- 2 May –
  - TV3 was placed into receivership but continued to broadcast.
  - Debut of He-Man and the Masters of the Universe on TV3, nearly 7 years after its original premiere.
- 18 May – Sky Network Television, New Zealand's first pay television service, began broadcasting to Auckland with three channels (Sky Movies, Sky Sport and CNN) on scrambled UHF frequencies. By mid-year, Sky extended its UHF service to Hamilton and Tauranga.
- 20 May – A second series of Pioneer Woman, over three parts, was broadcast on TV One in a mid-evening slot on Sunday nights. The first series was shown in 1983.
- 26 May – The final episode of It's in the Bag, from Kaikohe, was broadcast on TV One at 7pm.
- 2 June – The New Adventures of Black Beauty debuted on TV3 with a 90-minute series premiere at 6.30pm. The 26-part series screened Saturdays at 7.30pm.
- 13 June – The sitcom version of The Billy T James Show premiered on TV3 and screened Wednesdays at 7.30pm.
- 17 June – Opus, a weekly programme devoted to classical music and the performing arts, was replaced by a new series called 10AM. Screening Sundays at 10am–12pm (as the title suggested) on TV One, the series covered the arts spectrum, with news, reviews, features and performances in a magazine-style format. It combined locally produced items with content from The South Bank Show and the Australian series Arts World.
- 18 June – Home and Away moved to five days a week at 5pm on TV3, with The Oprah Winfrey Show in the new timeslot of 5.30pm (as a lead-in to 3 National News).
- 25 June – Joanna Paul replaced Philip Sherry as anchor of 3 National News at 6.30pm and presented both 3 National News and Nightline on weeknights.
- 9 July – The Westcott File, a current affairs segment presented by Genevieve Westcott, began screening as part of 3 National News at 6.30pm.
- 20 July – The final episode of the New Zealand version of A Question of Sport was broadcast on TV One at 8pm. A Question of Sport was revived by TVNZ in 1994.
- 22 July – A New Zealand produced episode of the aviation documentary series Reaching for the Skies entitled "An End to Isolation" was broadcast on TV3 at 6.30pm. It traced the development of aviation in New Zealand, with archive footage, interviews with some of the country's early aviators and a look at the impact flying had had on the Land of the Long White Cloud.
- 27 July – Breakfast News (half hourly news and weather bulletins between 7–8.30am) was last broadcast on Channel 2.
- August – Suzy Cato joined TV3 as co-host of EBS, alongside Russell Rooster and Kiri Kea.
- 1 August – The Billy T James Show took a break and was replaced by Larger than Life, an Australian sketch comedy series featuring The Comedy Company's Mark Mitchell, which took a not-very-serious look at life and its problems. Larger than Life screened Wednesdays at 7.30pm on TV3 and ran for six weeks. The Billy T James Show returned on 12 September.
- 6 August – The midday edition of One Network News was reduced in duration from a 15 minute bulletin to just five minutes.
- 9 August – The James Gang Rides Again, a documentary about Billy T James and five of his fellow heart transplant patients from Auckland's Green Lane Hospital, was broadcast on TV3 at 8.30pm.
- 13 August – Perigo, a weekly current affairs interview programme with Lindsay Perigo, was first broadcast on TV One. It screened Mondays at around 9.30pm but moved to Wednesdays from 3 October, beginning with the Perigo Election Specials in the lead-up to the 1990 election.
- 14 August – 1990: The Issues, a combination of sketch comedy and political satire with David McPhail and Jon Gadsby, premiered on TV3 and screened Tuesdays at 7.30pm as a lead-in to the 1990 election.
- 18 August – Animal Antics, a quiz show in which New Zealand celebrities were tested on animal facts to raise funds for their favourite animal charity, premiered on Channel 2. It was hosted by Mark Leishman and screened Saturdays at 6.30pm.
- 25 August – Pepsi began sponsoring RTR Sounz! and RTR Countdown through a naming rights agreement; both programmes screened on Channel 2. RTR Megamix and RTR New Releases finished a week earlier (as part of 3.45 Live!).
- 25 August – New Zealand's Funniest Home Videos, presented by Ian Taylor, premiered on Channel 2 and screened Saturdays at 8.05pm.
- 31 August – Radio with Pictures was revived on Channel 2 as a music video show with no presenters and screened Fridays at around 11.30pm.
- 1 September – Telethon 1990 was broadcast on Channel 2. Hosted by Paul Holmes, Judy Bailey and John Hawkesby, Telethon originated from Auckland, Hamilton, Palmerston North, Wellington, Christchurch and Dunedin and ran for 24 hours (from 7.30pm Saturday 1 September until 7.30pm Sunday 2 September).
- 2 September – Mark Leishman shaved the moustache, and Telethon 1990 raised over $4 million for the Celebration of Age Trust.
- 10 September – British soap Gems premiered on TV3 and screened weekdays at midday in a double episode format, and Home and Away moved to double episodes at 4.30pm.
- 13 September – An official opening concert of Auckland's Aotea Centre, featuring Dame Kiri Te Kanawa and the New Zealand Symphony Orchestra, was broadcast on TV One.
- 15 September – Infocus, a magazine-style news show for teenagers, made its debut as part of TV3's EBS. Created by TV3 producer Ian Kingsford-Smith and funded by NZ On Air, Infocus featured then 16-year-olds Tony Bartlett (Howick College) and Stephanie Tauevihi (Northcote College) as presenters. News and magazine items were produced by students from 11 Auckland schools. There were also news clips from other centres. An extended edition of Infocus, on Sundays (9-9.25am), was later added.
- 1 October – ITN World News was first broadcast on Channel 2 and screened weekdays at 7am, with a same-day repeat at 8am. During the summer months, ITN World News screened at 8am.
- 2 October – The final episode of Wildtrack, a wildlife series for children, was broadcast on Channel 2 as part of 3.45 Live!. Taylormade Productions, a Dunedin-based independent production house, took over the production of Wildtrack in 1991 with a new name (Wild T) and a new format.
- 9 October – Roger Hall's Neighbourhood Watch, a comedy series about life in New Zealand suburbs, premiered on TV One and screened Tuesdays at 7.30pm.
- 11 October – Hard Copy, an American tabloid television show, began screening on TV One in the North Island and screened at 5.30pm as a lead-in to One Network News. It was later replaced by the British sitcom George & Mildred, and Hard Copy screened weekdays at midday from 3 December.
- 12 October – A Sir Howard Morrison special at the Aotea Centre, featuring the Auckland Philharmonia Orchestra, was broadcast on TV One.
- 13 October – 48 Hours, a US documentary series that deals with social issues, premiered on TV One and screened Saturdays at 7.30pm.
- 21 October – The mid-evening/late night edition of One Network News, on weekends, was last broadcast on TV One.
- 25 October – The final episode of Ten Out of Ten, a live programme to help solve homework problems with host Rodney Bryant, was broadcast on Channel 2 as part of 3.45 Live!.
- 27 October – Lindsay Perigo and Paul Holmes presented TVNZ's election night coverage via TV One, while TV3's own coverage was presented by Bill Ralston, Genevieve Westcott and Joanna Paul. The governing Labour Party, led by Mike Moore, was defeated, ending its two terms in office. The National Party, led by Jim Bolger, won a landslide victory and formed the new government.
- 28 October – Living Treasures, a 10-part series in which Ian Fraser interviewed world figures who visited New Zealand as part of the 1990 celebrations, began screening on TV One.
- 23 November – Te Karere Headlines and the midday edition of One Network News were last broadcast on TV One.
- 25 November – The final edition of Frontline, from Wellington's Avalon Television Studios, was broadcast on TV One at 6.30pm. Within the next year, Frontline moved production to TVNZ's Auckland studios.
- 26 November – Beyond 2000 moved from Channel 2 to TV One and screened Mondays at around 8.30pm.
- 2 December – On weekdays Fast Forward (a science and technology programme from TVNZ), A Dog's Show and Country Calendar were repeated on TV One, and That's Fairly Interesting was repeated on Channel 2.
- 10 December – Cartoon All-Stars to the Rescue was simulcast on both TV One and Channel 2 at 4.20pm. Then-Prime Minister Jim Bolger introduced the New Zealand screening. Within the next year, Cartoon All-Stars to the Rescue was repeated on Channel 2 at 5pm on 14 October 1991 and simulcast with TV3.
- 14 December – The final editions of The Mainland Touch (Christchurch) and The South Tonight (Dunedin) were broadcast on TV One at 5.45pm.
- 14 December – The final edition of 3.45 Live! was broadcast on Channel 2.
- 14 December – Star Trek: The Next Generation premiered on Channel 2 and screened Fridays at 7.30pm during the summer of 1990/91.
- 28 December – Play School and other children's programmes were last broadcast on TV One. The New Zealand version of Play School ceased production during 1990 but continued to screen on Channel 2 in reruns a few years later.

== Debuts ==
=== Domestic ===
- 16 January – Arthur Lydiard (TV One) (1990)
- 23 January – The Kenyans: Running a Revolution (TV One) (1990)
- 12 February – Nightline (TV3) (1990–2013)
- 16 February – RTR New Releases (Channel 2) (1990)
- 18 February – Betty's Bunch (Channel 2) (1990)
- 27 February – Royal Tours: The Queen and Us (TV One) (1990)
- 10 March – RTR Sounz! (Channel 2) (1990)
- 20 March – I Want to Die at Home (TV One) (1990)
- 25 March – 60 Minutes (TV3) (1990–1992, 2002–2012)
- 10 April – Gina, the Spirit of the Bluebird (TV One) (1990)
- 15 April – Circus Oz (Channel 2) (1990)
- 24 April Māori Battalion March to Victory (TV One) (1990)
- 29 April – Marae (Channel 2) (1990)
- 8 May – Miles Turns 21 (TV One) (1990)
- 18 May – The Main Event (TV3) (1990)
- 20 May – All for One (Channel 2) (1990)
- 20 May – Pioneer Woman (TV One) (1983, 1990)
- 29 May – Billy T James: Alive and Gigging (TV3) (1990)
- 2 June – The New Adventures of Black Beauty (TV3) (also United Kingdom and Australia) (1990–1992)
- 17 June – The Billy T James Show (TV3) (1990)
- 17 June – 10AM (TV One) (1990)
- 15 July – African Journey (Channel 2) (1990)
- 22 July – Reaching for the Skies - "An End to Isolation" (TV3) (1990)
- 9 August – The James Gang Rides Again (TV3) (1990)
- 18 August – Animal Antics (Channel 2) (1990)
- 25 August – New Zealand's Funniest Home Videos (Channel 2) (1990–1995)
- 31 August – Radio with Pictures (Channel 2) (1976–1988, 1990–91)
- 15 September – Infocus (TV3) (1990–1994)
- 9 October – Neighbourhood Watch (TV One) (1990)
- 27 November – The Great Earthquake Survival Test (TV One) (1990)

=== International ===
- 2 January – (Australia) Body Business (Channel 2)
- 2 January – (United Kingdom) Professor Lobster (Channel 2)
- 2 January – (United Kingdom) Kim (TV One)
- 3 January – (United Kingdom) The Franchise Affair (1988) (TV One)
- 4 January – (United States) The Richest Cat in the World (TV3)
- 5 January – (United States) Nightmare in Badham County (TV3)
- 7 January – (United Kingdom) Birds for All Seasons (TV One)
- 7 January – (United States) Rage of Angels: The Story Continues (TV3)
- 7 January – (United Kingdom) Game, Set and Match (TV One)
- 7 January – (United Kingdom) By the Sword Divided (TV One)
- 14 January – (Australia) Cyclone Tracy (Channel 2)
- 14 January – (United States) The Red Spider (TV3)
- 14 January – Nature of Australia (TV3)
- 17 January – (United States) Heartland (1989) (Channel 2)
- 17 January – (United Kingdom) Forgive Our Foolish Ways (TV One)
- 17 January – (United States) American Wilderness (TV One)
- 20 January – (United States) The Good, the Bad, and Huckleberry Hound (Channel 2)
- 21 January – (United Kingdom) The Snow Spider (Channel 2)
- 21 January – (United Kingdom) Chocky's Challenge (TV3)
- 22 January – (United States) Hands of a Stranger (Channel 2)
- 24 January – (United States) Island Son (Channel 2)
- 24 January – (United States) Lena: My 100 Children (TV One)
- 26 January – (United States) Spider-Man (1977) (TV3)
- 27 January – (United States) Top Cat and the Beverly Hills Cats (Channel 2)
- 29 January – (United States) / (Japan) Saber Rider and the Star Sheriffs (TV3)
- 29 January – (United States) / (Canada) Police Academy: The Animated Series (TV3)
- 1 February – (United Kingdom) Cloud Waltzing (Channel 2)
- 1 February – (United States) Driving Academy (TV3)
- 2 February – (United States) The Ultimate Stuntman: A Tribute to Dar Robinson (TV3)
- 2 February – (United States) America's All Star Tribute to Elizabeth Taylor (TV3)
- 3 February – (United States) Major Dad (Channel 2)
- 3 February – (United States) The Jim Henson Hour (Channel 2)
- 3 February – (United States) Yogi's Great Escape (Channel 2)
- 4 February – (United States) A Death in California (TV3)
- 5 February – (United Kingdom) Blackadder Goes Forth (TV One)
- 5 February – (United States) The Critical List (TV3)
- 5 February – (United States) Blood Vows: The Story of a Mafia Wife (Channel 2)
- 7 February – (United States) Anything but Love (TV One)
- 8 February – (United States) Supercarrier (TV3)
- 8 February – (United Kingdom) The Dark Angel (TV One)
- 9 February – (United States) Trackdown: Finding the Good Bar Killer (TV3)
- 9 February – (United States) Highwaymen (TV3)
- 10 February – (United States) Finnegan Begin Again (TV One)
- 10 February – (United States) Scooby-Doo! and the Reluctant Werewolf (Channel 2)
- 11 February – (United States) / (United Kingdom) Jack the Ripper (1988) (Channel 2)
- 12 February – (United States) Dress Gray (TV3)
- 12 February – (United Kingdom) Bangers and Mash (Channel 2)
- 12 February – (United States) C.O.P.S. (Channel 2)
- 12 February – (United States) The Oprah Winfrey Show (TV3)
- 12 February – (Japan) / (United States) / (Netherlands) Ox Tales (Channel 2)
- 12 February – (United Kingdom) Give Us a Clue (TV3)
- 12 February – (United States) Trial by Jury (TV3)
- 12 February – (United States) The Bold and the Beautiful (TV3)
- 12 February – (United States) Defenders of the Earth (Channel 2)
- 12 February – (United States) Another World (TV3)
- 13 February – (Spain) Wisdom of the Gnomes (Channel 2)
- 13 February – (United States) The Face of Rage (Channel 2)
- 14 February – (United Kingdom) Woof! (Channel 2)
- 14 February – (Japan) / (United States) / (Netherlands) Wowser (Channel 2)
- 15 February – (United States) Brotherhood of Justice (Channel 2)
- 15 February – (United States) Heathcliff and Marmaduke (Channel 2)
- 16 February – (Poland) The Adventures of a Blue Knight (Channel 2)
- 16 February – (United States) Knight & Daye (TV One)
- 17 February – (United States) Starcrossed (TV3)
- 17 February – (United States) Slimer! And the Real Ghostbusters (TV3)
- 18 February – (United Kingdom) Comeback (TV One)
- 18 February – (United States) Napoleon and Josephine: A Love Story (TV3)
- 18 February – (United States) Popples (Channel 2)
- 18 February – (United Kingdom) Greenclaws (Channel 2)
- 19 February – (United States) Studio 5-B (TV One)
- 19 February – (United Kingdom) The One Game (TV One)
- 20 February – (United States) The Defiant Ones (Channel 2)
- 20 February – (Australia) Shipwrecked (TV3)
- 22 February – (United States) Six Against the Rock (Channel 2)
- 26 February – (United States) The Death of Richie (Channel 2)
- 26 February – (Canada) Sword of Gideon (TV3)
- 28 February – (United States) Dirty Dancing (TV3)
- 1 March – (United States) Combat Academy (TV3)
- 2 March – (United Kingdom) Monkeys (TV One)
- 3 March – (United States) Peaceable Kingdom (Channel 2)
- 4 March – (United States) Love with a Twist (TV3)
- 4 March – (United States) Easy Street (TV3)
- 6 March – (United States) Sidekicks (TV3)
- 6 March – (United States) Murderers Among Us: The Simon Wiesenthal Story (TV One)
- 9 March – (United States) Calendar Girl Murders (TV3)
- 9 March – (United States) Doctor Doctor (Channel 2)
- 9 March – (United Kingdom) Hot Dog (Channel 2)
- 18 March – (United States) The Go Show (TV3)
- 19 March – (Australia) Bangkok Hilton (Channel 2)
- 19 March – (Australia) The Power, The Passion (TV3)
- 19 March – (South Africa) Shaka Zulu (TV3)
- 21 March – (United Kingdom) Windfalls (Channel 2)
- 22 March – (United States) The Wonder Years (TV3)
- 23 March – (Australia) Beyond 2000 (Channel 2)
- 23 March – (United States) How to Pick Up Girls (TV3)
- 25 March – (United Kingdom) Raspberry Ripple (TV One)
- 25 March – (United Kingdom) Gophers! (Channel 2)
- 7 April – (United States) Case Closed (TV3)
- 7 April – (United States) Country Clips (TV3)
- 8 April – (United States) Just the Ten of Us (Channel 2)
- 8 April – (United Kingdom) The Lion, the Witch and the Wardrobe (1988) (Channel 2)
- 9 April – (Australia) Family Feud (TV3)
- 10 April – (United States) A Cry for Love (TV One)
- 10 April – (United States) Crime Story (TV3)
- 11 April – (United States) Moving Target (TV3)
- 11 April – (United States) The Dirty Dozen: Next Mission (Channel 2)
- 12 April – (United States) My Body, My Child (TV One)
- 13 April – (France) Bouli (Channel 2)
- 13 April – (United States) Easter Dream (TV One)
- 14 April – (United States) Poison Ivy (TV3)
- 16 April – (Australia) The Making of 0–9 (Channel 2)
- 16 April – (Japan) Ultraman: The Adventure Begins (Channel 2)
- 16 April – (United States) The Murder of Mary Phagan (TV One)
- 17 April – (United Kingdom) Alexei Sayle's Stuff (Channel 2)
- 17 April – (Japan) / (Germany) Maya the Bee (Saban dub) (Channel 2)
- 20 April – (United States) Blue Thunder (Channel 2)
- 20 April – (United States) The King of Love (TV3)
- 21 April – (United States) Ladykillers (TV3)
- 21 April – (United States) Unsub (Channel 2)
- 21 April – (United States) Ring Raiders (Channel 2)
- 22 April – (United States) Centennial (TV3)
- 22 April – (United Kingdom) The Hymnmakers (TV One)
- 23 April – (United States) Generations (TV3)
- 23 April – (United States) Sister Kate (TV3)
- 24 April – (United States) Nobody's Child (TV One)
- 24 April – (United Kingdom) Bodytalk (TV One)
- 25 April – (Republic of Ireland) The Irish Rovers Silver Anniversary (TV One)
- 25 April – (United States) C.A.T. Squad (TV3)
- 26 April – (United States) The Earth Day Special (Channel 2)
- 26 April – (United States) A Question of Love (TV One)
- 29 April – (United States) Eisenhower and Lutz (TV3)
- 29 April – (United States) Eyes on the Prize (TV One)
- 2 May – (United States) Bridge to Silence (TV3)
- 2 May – (United States) He-Man and the Masters of the Universe (TV3)
- 4 May – (United States) Airwolf (TV3)
- 7 May – (United Kingdom) Mike and Angelo (Channel 2)
- 8 May – (Australia) All the Rivers Run II (Channel 2)
- 9 May – (United States) Flight 90: Disaster on the Potomac (TV3)
- 10 May – (United States) Hot Pursuit (TV3)
- 10 May – (United States) Mork and Mindy (1982) (Channel 2)
- 12 May – (United States) Free Spirit (Channel 2)
- 13 May – (United Kingdom) Gentry (TV One)
- 13 May – (United States) Police Story: The Freeway Killings (TV3)
- 13 May – (United States) The Amazing Spider-Man (TV3)
- 14 May – (United States) Alvin and the Chipmunks (Murakami-Wolf-Swenson/DIC version) (Channel 2)
- 15 May – (France) / (Canada) The Smoggies (Channel 2)
- 15 May – (United Kingdom) Disaster at Hillsborough (TV One)
- 18 May – (Canada) Worlds Apart (TV One)
- 26 May – (United States) Galtar and the Golden Lance (Channel 2)
- 26 May – (United States) Great Circuses of the World (Channel 2)
- 28 May – (Republic of Ireland) / (Australia) Act of Betrayal (TV One)
- 29 May – (United States) Adam: His Song Continues (TV One)
- 6 June – (Australia) / (United Kingdom) The Heroes (Channel 2)
- 6 June – (United States) Stillwatch (TV One)
- 9 June – (United States) The Lion of Africa (TV3)
- 15 June – (United States) Top Secret (TV3)
- 15 June – (United Kingdom) Moschops (Channel 2)
- 15 June – (United Kingdom) The River (Channel 2)
- 15 June – (United Kingdom) Poddington Peas (Channel 2)
- 15 June – (United States) The Fonz and the Happy Days Gang (Channel 2)
- 16 June – (United States) Hardball (Channel 2)
- 17 June – (United States) The Zany Adventures of Robin Hood (TV3)
- 17 June – (United Kingdom) The Heat of the Day (TV One)
- 18 June – (United States) SST: Death Flight (TV3)
- 18 June – (United States) The Centurions (Channel 2)
- 19 June – (Australia) Tudawali (TV One)
- 20 June – (United States) Born to Be Sold (TV3)
- 21 June – (United States) Stone Pillow (TV One)
- 23 June – (United Kingdom) Don't Miss Wax (TV3)
- 24 June – (United Kingdom) To Each His Own (TV One)
- 24 June – (United States) Gunsmoke: Return to Dodge (TV3)
- 25 June – (United States) Bosom Buddies (TV One)
- 29 June – (United States) American Geisha (TV3)
- 30 June – (United Kingdom) Floyd on Britain and Ireland (TV One)
- 9 July – (United Kingdom) Les Misérables (TV One)
- 9 July – (Australia) Tanamera – Lion of Singapore (Channel 2)
- 9 July – (United Kingdom) Vanity Fair (1987) (TV One)
- 10 July – (United States) Baby Girl Scott (TV One)
- 10 July – (United States) Confessions of a Married Man (TV3)
- 10 July – (United Kingdom) This is David Lander (Channel 2)
- 11 July – (United States) Mayday at 40,000 Feet! (TV3)
- 11 July – (United States) The Return of Ben Casey (TV One)
- 18 July – (United States) Trollkins (Channel 2)
- 28 July – (United States) The Karate Kid (Channel 2)
- 29 July – (Canada) Lorne Greene's New Wilderness (TV3)
- 29 July – (United States) The People Next Door (TV3)
- 29 July – (Japan) My Favorite Fairy Tales (Channel 2)
- 29 July – (Australia) / (United Kingdom) The Heroes (TV3)
- 29 July – (United States) Whales Weep Not (TV One)
- 29 July – (United Kingdom) Korea: The Unknown War (TV3)
- 30 July – (Japan) Peter Pan: The Animated Series (Channel 2)
- 30 July – (United States) The Marshall Chronicles (TV3)
- 1 August – (Australia) Larger Than Life (TV3)
- 1 August – (United Kingdom) A Very British Coup (TV3)
- 3 August – (United States) Threesome (TV3)
- 4 August – (United States) Chicago Story (TV3)
- 4 August – (Canada) Learning the Ropes (Channel 2)
- 4 August – (United States) War and Peace in the Nuclear Age (TV One)
- 5 August – (United States) Laverne & Shirley (1981) (Channel 2)
- 5 August – (United Kingdom) One More Audience with Dame Edna Everage (TV One)
- 6 August – (United States) Beverly Hills Buntz (Channel 2)
- 7 August – (United States) Jonny Quest (1986) (Channel 2)
- 7 August – (United Kingdom) The Paradise Club (TV One)
- 8 August – (United Kingdom) A Royal Birthday Gala (TV One)
- 10 August – (United States) Desperate (TV One)
- 11 August – (United Kingdom) Drift the Mute Swan (TV One)
- 12 August – (Canada) Body of Evidence (TV3)
- 12 August – (United States) The Bourne Identity (Channel 2)
- 14 August – (France) Seabert (Channel 2)
- 14 August – (United Kingdom) The Queen Mother at 90 (Channel 2)
- 14 August – (United States) / (United Kingdom) Paddington Bear (Channel 2)
- 15 August – (United States) Elvis and Me (TV3)
- 17 August – (United Kingdom) Winter Flight (TV One)
- 18 August – (United Kingdom) HRH the Prince of Wales: The Earth in Balance (TV One)
- 19 August – (Australia) Dr. Jekyll and Mr. Hyde (Channel 2)
- 20 August – (United States) HeartBeat (TV3)
- 22 August – (United Kingdom) No Strings (Channel 2)
- 22 August – (United States) Dangerous Affection (TV3)
- 22 August – (United States) Nadia (TV One)
- 24 August – (United States) The Man Who Fell to Earth (1987) (TV3)
- 25 August – (United States) Doogie Howser, M.D. (Channel 2)
- 25 August – (Germany) / (Austria) / (France) / (Sweden) / (Spain) / (Czech Republic) Frankenstein's Aunt (Channel 2)
- 26 August – (United Kingdom) Oranges Are Not the Only Fruit (TV One)
- 26 August – (United Kingdom) The Bell-Run (TV One)
- 27 August – (United Kingdom) Album (Channel 2)
- 27 August – (United States) Homeroom (TV One)
- 31 August – (United States) The King of Love (TV3)
- 2 September – (United Kingdom) Way Upstream (TV One)
- 3 September – (United Kingdom) My Brother Jonathan (TV One)
- 4 September – (Japan) / (Canada) The Wonderful Wizard of Oz (Channel 2)
- 5 September – (United States) Promised a Miracle (TV3)
- 7 September – (United States) The Ryan White Story (TV One)
- 8 September – (United States) The Young Riders (Channel 2)
- 9 September – (United Kingdom) The Country Boy (Channel 2)
- 9 September – (Australia) Kidnapped (Channel 2)
- 10 September – (United Kingdom) Gems (TV3)
- 13 September – (Canada) Easy Prey (TV3)
- 14 September – (United States) Will Vinton's Claymation Classics (Channel 2)
- 15 September – (United States) Laguna Heat (TV3)
- 15 September – (United Kingdom) Lost Worlds, Vanished Lives (TV One)
- 16 September – (Canada) Vietnam: The Ten Thousand Day War (TV3)
- 17 September – (Australia) Col'n Carpenter (TV3)
- 18 September – (United Kingdom) Mr. Bean (TV One)
- 19 September – (United States) An Early Frost (TV3)
- 21 September – (United Kingdom) The Ratties (Channel 2)
- 22 September – (United States) War and Remembrance (TV One)
- 23 September – (United Kingdom) Making News (TV One)
- 23 September – (United Kingdom) And a Nightingale Sang (TV One)
- 24 September – (United States) The Saint in Manhattan (TV One)
- 24 September – (Australia) The Great Bookie Robbery (TV One)
- 24 September – (United States) Braker (TV One)
- 26 September – (United States) Cracked Up (TV One)
- 26 September – (United States) Foofur (Channel 2)
- 27 September – (United States) Gumby Adventures (Channel 2)
- 27 September – (Canada) Two Men (TV One)
- 28 September – (United States) A Stoning in Fulham County (TV One)
- 30 September – (United Kingdom) Summer's Lease (TV One)
- 1 October – (United Kingdom) The Labours of Erica (TV One)
- 2 October – (United Kingdom) May to December (TV One)
- 3 October – (Canada) Mama's Going to Buy You a Mockingbird (TV One)
- 5 October – (United Kingdom) No Job for a Lady (TV One)
- 5 October – (United States) Vengeance: The Story of Tony Cimo (TV3)
- 5 October – (United Kingdom) Flying Squad (TV One)
- 6 October – (Canada) Just for Laughs (TV3)
- 7 October – (United Kingdom) Last Night of the Proms (TV One)
- 7 October – (United Kingdom) Chocky's Children (TV3)
- 8 October – (United States) / (Canada) Star Wars: Droids (Channel 2)
- 8 October – (United Kingdom) Firefighter (TV One)
- 9 October – (Australia) Shadow of the Cobra (Channel 2)
- 9 October – (United States) FM (TV One)
- 9 October – (United States) One of the Boys (1989) (TV One)
- 9 October – (United States) The California Raisin Show (Channel 2)
- 10 October – (United States) Destination America (TV One)
- 10 October – (Canada) / (United States) Liberace: Behind the Music (TV3)
- 11 October – (United States) Hard Copy (TV One)
- 11 October – (United States) Fight for Life (TV One)
- 13 October – (United States) Wolf (TV3)
- 13 October – (United States) 48 Hours (TV One)
- 14 October – (United Kingdom) Jumping the Queue (TV One)
- 14 October – (United States) The Greatest Adventure: Stories from the Bible (Channel 2)
- 17 October – (United States) Live-In (TV One)
- 17 October – (Germany) The Hallo Spencer Show (Channel 2)
- 17 October – (United States) What Price Victory (TV One)
- 18 October – (United States) Divorce Wars: A Love Story (TV One)
- 18 October – (United Kingdom) The Poison That Waits (TV One)
- 18 October – (United States) Dream Date (TV3)
- 19 October – (United Kingdom) Satellite City (Channel 2)
- 25 October – (United States) / (Canada) Star Wars: Ewoks (Channel 2)
- 27 October – (United States) Dink, the Little Dinosaur (Channel 2)
- 28 October – (United Kingdom) First of the Summer Wine (TV One)
- 28 October – (United States) C.A.T. Squad: Python Wolf (TV3)
- 4 November – (United Kingdom) She's Been Away (TV One)
- 4 November – (Australia) 20,000 Leagues Under the Sea (Channel 2)
- 7 November – (United States) Infidelity (TV3)
- 8 November – (United Kingdom) A Bit of Fry and Laurie (TV One)
- 17 November – (United Kingdom) The Flying Gourmet's Guide: A Guide to the Great British Bird Table ( TV One)
- 19 November – (United States) Lonesome Dove (Channel 2)
- 20 November – (United States) Harem (TV3)
- 21 November – (United Kingdom) On the Up (TV One)
- 29 November – (United States) Totally Hidden Video (Channel 2)
- 29 November – (United Kingdom) Capital City (Channel 2)
- 2 December – (United States) Happy Birthday Bugs: 50 Looney Years (Channel 2)
- 2 December – (United States) Into the Homeland (TV3)
- 2 December – (United Kingdom) Gruey Twoey (Channel 2)
- 2 December – (Canada) You Can't Do That on Television (TV3)
- 2 December – (United States) Mad Scientist (Channel 2)
- 3 December – (United States) America's Funniest People (Channel 2)
- 3 December – (United States) / (France) / (Canada) Heathcliff (Channel 2)
- 4 December – (United Kingdom) Running Wild (TV3)
- 5 December – (United States) Captain Planet and the Planeteers (Channel 2)
- 5 December – (United States) The Gary Coleman Show (Channel 2)
- 8 December – (United Kingdom) The Kit Curran Radio Show (TV3)
- 8 December – (United States) Prime Time Pets (Channel 2)
- 9 December – (United States) Dragnet Today (Channel 2)
- 9 December – (United Kingdom) You Rang, M'Lord? (TV One)
- 9 December – (United Kingdom) Fight Cancer (TV One)
- 9 December – (United Kingdom) The Beiderbecke Connection (TV One)
- 9 December – (United States) Marvin, Baby of the Year (Channel 2)
- 9 December – (Canada) Anne of Green Gables (Channel 2)
- 9 December – (United States) Beauty Queens (TV One)
- 10 December – (United States) Cartoon All-Stars to the Rescue (TV One)/(Channel 2)
- 10 December – (United Kingdom) Blackadder's Christmas Carol (Channel 2)
- 10 December – (United States) Snoops (TV3)
- 11 December – (United Kingdom) The Forest of Boland Light Railway (TV One)
- 12 December – (United States) Baywatch (Channel 2)
- 14 December – (United States) Star Trek: The Next Generation (Channel 2)
- 25 December – (Australia) The Adventures of Candy Claus (TV3)
- 25 December – (United Kingdom) Fireman Sam: Snow Business (Channel 2)
- 25 December – (United States) Mother Goose Rock 'n' Rhyme (Channel 2)
- 27 December – (United States) Adam-12 (1990) (Channel 2)
- 30 December – (United Kingdom) Chance in a Million (TV One)
- 31 December – (Spain) Carreras Domingo Pavarotti in Concert (TV One)
- 31 December – (Spain) The Fruitties (Channel 2)
- 31 December – (Japan) / (United States) The Adventures of the Galaxy Rangers (Channel 2)
- 31 December – (United States) The New Adventures of Batman (Channel 2)
- (United States) Dungeons & Dragons (Channel 2)

== Changes to network affiliation ==
This is a list of programs which made their premiere on a New Zealand television network that had previously premiered on another New Zealand television network. The networks involved in the switch of allegiances are predominantly both free-to-air networks or both subscription television networks. Programs that have their free-to-air/subscription television premiere, after previously premiering on the opposite platform (free-to air to subscription/subscription to free-to air) are not included. In some cases, programs may still air on the original television network. This occurs predominantly with programs shared between subscription television networks.

=== International ===
Program	New network(s)	Previous network(s)	Date
(United States) The Porky Pig Show	TV One	Channel 2	19 January
(Poland) Teddy Drop Ear	Channel 2	TV One	22 January
(United States) / (Mexico) Amigo and Friends	TV One	Channel 2	22 January
(United Kingdom) Doris	TV One	Channel 2	23 January
(United Kingdom) Rarg	Channel 2	TV One	30 January
(Canada) Tales of the Mouse Hockey League	Channel 2	TV One	6 February
(United Kingdom) Bananaman	TV One	Channel 2	7 February
(United States) The Porky Pig Show	Channel 2	TV One	12 February
(United States) ALF Tales	Channel 2	TV One	12 February
(United States) Jim Henson's Muppet Babies	Channel 2	TV One	12 February
(Canada) The Raccoons	Channel 2	TV One	13 February
(United Kingdom) Doctor Snuggles	TV One	Channel 2	14 February
(United Kingdom) Rainbow	TV One	Channel 2	15 February
(United States) Misterjaw	TV One	Channel 2	16 February
(United States) Bugs Bunny's Thanksgiving Diet	Channel 2	TV One	17 February
(United States) Groovie Goolies	Channel 2	NZBC	17 March
(United Kingdom) The Wombles	Channel 2	TV One	18 March
(Australia) Mother and Son	TV One	Channel 2	31 March
(United Kingdom) Rebecca (Welsh series)	Channel 2	TV One	1 April
(United Kingdom) Thomas the Tank Engine & Friends	TV3	Channel 2	16 April
(United States) The Days and Nights of Molly Dodd	Channel 2	TV One	18 April
(United States) Falcon Crest	Channel 2	TV One	19 April
(Australia) Special Squad	TV One	Channel 2	25 April
(Australia) Colour in the Creek	Channel 2	TV One	7 May
(United Kingdom) / (United States) Jim Henson's Mother Goose Stories	TV One	Channel 2	16 May
(United Kingdom) The ChuckleHounds	TV One	Channel 2	18 May
(United Kingdom) The Fall and Rise of Reginald Perrin	Channel 2	TV One	28 May
(United Kingdom) Fireman Sam	Channel 2	TV One	8 June
(United States) The Munsters	Channel 2	TV One	2 July
(United States) The Munsters	TV One	Channel 2	6 July
(United States) Captain Caveman and the Teen Angels	Channel 2	South Pacific Television	11 July
(United Kingdom) P.C. Pinkerton	TV One	Channel 2	31 July
(United States) Jana of the Jungle	Channel 2	South Pacific Television	9 August
(United Kingdom) The Sooty Show	TV One	Channel 2	10 August
(United Kingdom) Andy Robson	TV3	TV One	16 September
(United Kingdom) Monty Python's Flying Circus	Channel 2	TV One	9 October
(United Kingdom) Captain Pugwash	Channel 2	TV One	12 October
(Australia) Beyond 2000	TV One	Channel 2	26 November
(Canada) / (France) Babar	TV One	Channel 2	10 December

== New channels ==
=== Subscription ===
- Sky Sport
- Sky Movies
- CNN

== Television shows ==
- Play School (1975–1990)
- What Now (1981–present)
- Gloss (1987–1990)
- Blind Date (1989–1991)
- The Early Bird Show (1989–1992)
- Shark in the Park (1989–1992)
- New Zealand's Funniest Home Videos (1990–1995)
- 60 Minutes (1990–present)

== Ending this year ==
- 3:45 Live (Channel 2) (1989–1990)
- Gloss (Channel 2) (1987–1990)
- It's in the Bag (TV One) (1974–1979, 1986–1990)
- Opus (TV One) (1980s–1990)
- LaughINZ (TV3) (1989–1990)
- The Mainland Touch (TV One) (1980–1990)
- Perfect Match (TV3) (1989–1990)
- Play School (TV One/Channel 2) (1975–1990)
- A Question of Sport (TV One) (1988–1990)
- RTR Megamix (Channel 2) (1988–1990)
- RTR New Releases (Channel 2) (1990)
- The South Tonight (TV One) (1980–1990)
- Ten Out of Ten (Channel 2) (1989–1990)
- Top Town (Channel 2) (1976–1990)
- The Video Dispatch (Channel 2) (1980–1990)
- Wildtrack (Channel 2) (1981–1990)
