= 1991 in New Zealand television =

This is a list of New Zealand television events and premieres that occurred in 1991, the 32nd year of continuous operation of television in New Zealand.

== Events ==
- 3 January - New Zealand television debut of Australian medical drama G.P. on TV3.
- 4 January - American animated sitcom The Simpsons made its New Zealand premiere on Channel 2. The first episode to air is "Some Enchanted Evening".
- 6 January - The popular British cult marionette television series Thunderbirds returned to New Zealand television after a long absence with the series airing in a Sunday morning slot on Channel 2.
- 4 February - After 2 returned to Channel 2 with a 2.30pm start and a 4pm finish.
- 7 February - British children's television series Thomas the Tank Engine & Friends aired on TV3 one last time after a huge amount of reruns on the network since the switchover in 1990.
- 9 February - The Saturday morning programmes The Breakfast Club and What Now returned to Channel 2.
- 11 February - Wheel of Fortune debuted on Channel 2; it later revived in 2008 on TV One, and a year later they dropped the show due to financial issues.
- 14 March - New Zealand satirical comedy show More Issues first appeared on TV One.
- 19 March - Channel 2 transmitted the Australian children's television series Johnson and Friends.
- 19 March - After a long absence since its last air on 14 November 1989, British children's animation Postman Pat returned to airing in New Zealand with the series now airing on Channel 2. This also marked the third time all 13 episodes of the series were ever broadcast on Channel 2.
- 1 April - TV3 debuted a brand new children's educational series titled Aunties' Alphabet.
- 1 April - Hine Elder returned to hosting children's television with a brand new wrapper programme, The Bugs Bunny Show, which aired on Channel 2. The show included dozens of old classic Warner Bros. cartoons featuring its popular characters such as Bugs Bunny, Daffy Duck, Sylvester, Tweety, Wile E. Coyote, Road Runner, Pepe Le Pew and Porky Pig, special guests, competitions, viewer participation and giveaways and was shown weekdays at 5pm.
- 30 April - TV One premiered the popular British sitcom Keeping Up Appearances starring Patricia Routledge.
- 7 May - British children's television series Thomas the Tank Engine & Friends returns to airing on TV3 and continues broadcasting on the channel in the afternoons once again.
- 8 May - US animated environmental series Captain Planet and the Planeteers got its proper television premiere on Channel 2 after airing in the previous year with only one episode as an introduction. The series would begin with its very first episode "A Hero for Earth".
- 4 June - The last in series one of Johnson and Friends was shown on Channel 2 with "Cleaning Day". The iconic Australian children's TV series itself would return for a rerun on 10 December.
- 14 June - A brand new political chat show titled The Ralston Group began on TV3 as a replacement for E Street.
- 27 September - The British children's television series Thomas the Tank Engine & Friends transmitted on TV3 for the very last time. It would switch over to air on Channel 2 the very next year.
- 14 October - Cartoon All-Stars to the Rescue was simulcast on both Channel 2 and TV3 at 5pm. It was first shown on TVNZ the year before as a simulcast across TV One and Channel 2.
- 17 October - A 10-part comedy/documentary series titled Visual Symphonies began on TV One; it followed Lyn of Tawa (played by Ginette McDonald) on a journey through New Zealand and Australia.
- 17 October - A new magazine-style infotainment show titled The Paradise Picture Show premiered on Channel 2; it was hosted by Mark Leishman, Judith Kirk (now Jude Dobson) and 'crazy newcomer' Clark Bent (played by Jeremy Corbett).
- 10 November - Aramoana, a documentary which recalled the experiences the people of the small Otago town of Aramoana, screened on TV One; it was produced by Taylormade for TVNZ.
- 10 December - Australian children's television series Johnson and Friends aired on Channel 2 in New Zealand for a second time when the series got repeated for the first time.

== Debuts ==
=== Domestic ===
- 11 February - Wheel of Fortune (Channel 2) (1991-1996, 2008–2009)
- 14 March - More Issues (TV One) (1991-1992)
- 1 April - The Bugs Bunny Show (Channel 2) (1991-1992)
- 1 April - Aunties' Alphabet (TV3) (1991)
- 7 April - Star Runner (Channel 2) (1991)
- 6 May - Away Laughing (TV3) (1991-1993)
- 2 June - The Boy from Andromeda (Channel 2) (also Canada) (1991)
- 14 June - The Ralston Group (TV3) (1991-1994)
- 20 June - For the Love of Mike (TV One) (1991)

=== International ===
- 3 January - (United States) Bagdad Cafe (TV3)
- 3 January - (Australia) G.P. (TV3)
- 4 January - (United States) Bonanza: The Next Generation (TV One)
- 4 January - (United States) In Living Color (Channel 2)
- 4 January - (United States) The Simpsons (Channel 2)
- 4 January - (United States) Max Monroe: Loose Cannon (TV3)
- 4 January - (United States) High Risk (TV One)
- 4 January - (United States) Top Cops (Channel 2)
- 4 January - (United States) The Covenant (TV3)
- 6 January - (United States) Samson and Delilah (TV3)
- 11 January - (Australia) The Riddle of the Stinson (TV One)
- 11 January - (United States) A Friendship in Vienna (TV One)
- 13 January - (United Kingdom) City Tails (Channel 2)
- 17 January - (United States) Booker (Channel 2)
- 24 January - (United Kingdom) Waiting for God (TV One)
- 27 January - (United Kingdom) Oh, Mr. Toad (Channel 2)
- 27 January - (United Kingdom) Paradise Ploughed (TV One)
- 27 January - (United States) Cameraman Who Dared (TV One)
- 27 January - (United States) J. Edgar Hoover (TV3)
- 28 January - (United Kingdom) Scandal (1989) (TV One)
- 29 January - (United States) Shadow Play (TV3)
- 29 January - (United States) Rescue 911 (Channel 2)
- 29 January - (United Kingdom) French Fields (TV One)
- 29 January - (United States) Evening Shade (Channel 2)
- 30 January - (United States) Hostile Witness (TV One)
- 4 February - (United States) Casper and Friends (Channel 2)
- 4 February - (United Kingdom) Haggard (TV One)
- 16 February - (United States) The Fresh Prince of Bel-Air (Channel 2)
- 17 February - Nature of Australia (TV One)
- 17 February - (Germany) / (Netherlands) / (Socialist Federal Republic of Yugoslavia) / (United States) / (Finland) The Secret of the Black Dragon (TV3)
- 27 February - (United Kingdom) A Taste for Death (TV One)
- 27 February - (United Kingdom) Yellowthread Street (TV One)
- 28 February - (Australia) E Street (TV3)
- 1 March - (United States) Spider-Man (1981) (Channel 2)
- 6 March - (United Kingdom) Jeeves and Wooster (TV One)
- 9 March - (United Kingdom) Sob Sisters (TV One)
- 11 March - (United States) The Adventures of Don Coyote and Sancho Panda (Channel 2)
- 18 March - (United States) Goliath Awaits (TV3)
- 18 March - (Australia) Captain James Cook (TV One)
- 19 March - (Australia) Johnson and Friends (Channel 2)
- 21 March - (United Kingdom) What-a-Mess (Series 2) (Channel 2)
- 22 March - (United States) Killer in the Mirror (TV3)
- 23 March - (United States) Callie and Son (TV3)
- 1 April - (United States) Chip 'n Dale Rescue Rangers (TV3)
- 1 April - (United States) The New Adventures of Winnie the Pooh (TV3)
- 1 April - (United States) Tiny Toon Adventures (Channel 2)
- 2 April - (United States) Captain N: The Game Master (Channel 2)
- 4 April - (United States) The Oldest Rookie (TV3)
- 5 April - (United States) Quiet Victory: The Charlie Wedemeyer Story (TV One)
- 5 April - (United States) The Game of Love (TV One)
- 6 April - (United States) Bill & Ted's Excellent Adventures (1990) (Channel 2)
- 6 April - (United States) Hey Vern, It's Ernest! (TV3)
- 6 April - (United States) Bigfoot (TV3)
- 6 April - (United States) The Adventures of Raggedy Ann and Andy (TV3)
- 6 April - (Canada) Captain Power and the Soldiers of the Future (TV3)
- 6 April - (United States) The Super Mario Bros. Super Show! (TV3)
- 6 April - (United States) / (Canada) Beetlejuice (TV3)
- 7 April - (United States) The Arsenio Hall Show (TV3)
- 7 April - (Australia) Bright Sparks (Channel 2)
- 7 April - (United Kingdom) Superdogs (Channel 2)
- 8 April - (United States) Twin Peaks (TV3)
- 8 April - (United Kingdom) Confessional (TV One)
- 8 April - (United States) Lenny (TV3)
- 10 April - (United Kingdom) Boys from the Bush (TV One)
- 12 April - (United States) Get a Life (TV3)
- 27 April - (United Kingdom) The Happy Apple (TV3)
- 28 April - (United Kingdom) Kappatoo (Channel 2)
- 30 April - (United Kingdom) Keeping Up Appearances (TV One)
- 7 May - (United States) Wings (Channel 2)
- 12 May - (United States) The Jetsons Meet the Flintstones (Channel 2)
- 19 May - (United Kingdom) The Green Man (TV One)
- 19 May - (United States) The Great Los Angeles Earthquake (TV3)
- 22 May - (United States) Rockin' with Judy Jetson (TV One)
- 26 May - (United Kingdom) The Silver Chair (Channel 2)
- 27 May - (Australia) A Dangerous Life (TV One)
- 28 May - (United States) Lifestories (TV One)
- 30 May - (Australia) All Together Now (Channel 2)
- 31 May - (United Kingdom) Coconuts (Channel 2)
- 1 June - (United States) The Martian Chronicles (TV3)
- 1 June - (United States) Rude Dog and the Dweebs (Channel 2)
- 1 June - (United States) Lerne and Loewe: Broadway's Last Romantics (TV3)
- 10 June - (United Kingdom) Well Loved Tales (Channel 2)
- 10 June - (United States) LBJ: The Early Years (TV One)
- 11 June - (United Kingdom) One Foot in the Grave (TV One)
- 15 June - (Australia) Hey Hey It's Saturday (Channel 2)
- 17 June - (France) / (Italy) / (Canada) / (Socialist Federal Republic of Yugoslavia) Race for the Bomb (Channel 2)
- 19 June - (United Kingdom) Penny Crayon (Channel 2)
- 19 June - (United Kingdom) / (Canada) / (United States) Passion and Paradise (Channel 2)
- 20 June - (United States) / (Canada) / (Japan) The Adventures of the Little Koala (Channel 2)
- 26 June - (Australia) Chances (Channel 2)
- 26 June - (United States) World of Discovery (TV3)
- 30 June - (United States) Blind Faith (TV3)
- 1 July - (Japan) Samurai Pizza Cats (Channel 2)
- 2 July - (Australia) Fields of Fire III (TV One)
- 3 July - (United States) Working It Out (Channel 2)
- 6 July - (United States) Guys Next Door (TV3)
- 6 July - (United States) Elvis (Channel 2)
- 6 July - (Australia) The Australians (TV3)
- 6 July - (United States) Heroes (TV3)
- 7 July - (United Kingdom) Streetwise (Channel 2)
- 20 July - (United Kingdom) Strange Interlude (TV3)
- 24 July - (United States) Class Cruise (TV One)
- 24 July - (Canada) Neon Rider (Channel 2)
- 25 July - (United States) Super Force (Channel 2)
- 29 July - (United States) Law & Order (TV3)
- 29 July - (United States) Crosstown (TV3)
- 29 July - (United Kingdom) Birds of a Feather (TV One)
- 5 August - (United States) A Ticket to Ride (TV One)
- 10 August - (United States) B.L. Stryker (TV One)
- 12 August - (United Kingdom) Toucan Tecs (Channel 2)
- 12 August - (United States) Top Cops (Channel 2)
- 17 August - (Canada) Glory Enough for All (TV3)
- 17 August - (United States) Hound Town (Channel 2)
- 19 August - (United States) The Incredible Hulk Returns (TV3)
- 19 August - (United Kingdom) Bertie the Bat (Channel 2)
- 21 August - (Australia) Jackaroo (Channel 2)
- 24 August - (United States) What a Dummy (TV3)
- 2 September - (United States) Good Sports (Channel 2)
- 7 September - (United Kingdom) Madhur Jaffrey's Far Eastern Cookery (TV3)
- 7 September - (United States) Hull High (TV3)
- 7 September - (United States) Swamp Thing (1991) (Channel 2)
- 7 September - (United States) Monsters (TV3)
- 10 September - (Canada) / (France) Kitty Cats (Channel 2)
- 11 September - (United States) Beverly Hills, 90210 (Channel 2)
- 11 September - (United States) Yogi and the Invasion of the Space Bears (TV One)
- 11 September - (United States) / (Japan) Fox's Peter Pan and the Pirates (Channel 2)
- 11 September - (United States) The Muppets at Walt Disney World (TV3)
- 14 September - (United States) Attack of the Killer Tomatoes (Channel 2)
- 14 September - (United Kingdom) We Are Seven (TV One)
- 23 September - (United Kingdom) Jimbo and the Jet-Set (Channel 2)
- 24 September - (United Kingdom) Rules of Engagement (TV One)
- 25 September - (United States) Tropical Heat (TV3)
- 27 September - (United States) Detective Sadie and Son (Channel 2)
- 27 September - (United States) The Stepford Children (TV One)
- 30 September - (Australia) Double Dare (TV3)
- 13 October - (United States) Parker Lewis Can't Lose (Channel 2)
- 17 October - (Japan) / (France) Saban's Adventures of the Little Mermaid (Channel 2)
- 17 October - (United States) Desperado (TV One)
- 18 October - (United States) Going Places (Channel 2)
- 20 October - (United States) The Wizard of Oz (Channel 2)
- 26 October - (United States) Bobby's World (Channel 2)
- 26 October - (United States) The World's Greatest Stunts (Channel 2)
- 28 October - (United States) / (Canada) Anything to Survive (TV3)
- 28 October - (Japan) Pinocchio: The Series (TV3)
- 28 October - (United States) Double Exposure: The Story of Margaret Bourke-White (TV One)
- 3 November - (Canada) Road to Avonlea (Channel 2)
- 4 November - (United States) The Bullwinkle Show (Channel 2)
- 11 November - (United Kingdom) Nellie the Elephant (Channel 2)
- 11 November - (United States) Studs (Channel 2)
- 17 November - (United States) Cross of Fire (TV3)
- 17 November - (United Kingdom) Maid Marian and Her Merry Men (Channel 2)
- 21 November - (Canada) / (Croatia) The Little Flying Bears (Channel 2)
- 23 November - (United States) New Attitude (Channel 2)
- 23 November - (United States) Ferris Bueller (Channel 2)
- 25 November - (United Kingdom) The Piglet Files (TV One)
- 7 December - (United States) The Seekers (TV3)
- 9 December - (Iceland) / (Germany) Nonni and Manni (TV One)
- 11 December - (Canada) / (France) Jayce and the Wheeled Warriors (Channel 2)
- 13 December - (United States) The Flash (Channel 2)
- 14 December - (United States) / (Canada) RoboCop (Channel 2)
- 14 December - (United States) Stories to Remember (Channel 2)
- 22 December - (United States) The Scheme of Things (TV3)
- 25 December - (United Kingdom) The Fool of the World and the Flying Ship (Channel 2)
- 29 December - (Japan) The Littl' Bits (TV3)
- 29 December - (United States) Brotherhood of the Rose (TV3)

== Changes to network affiliation ==
This is a list of programs which made their premiere on a New Zealand television network that had previously premiered on another New Zealand television network. The networks involved in the switch of allegiances are predominantly both free-to-air networks or both subscription television networks. Programs that have their free-to-air/subscription television premiere, after previously premiering on the opposite platform (free-to air to subscription/subscription to free-to air) are not included. In some cases, programs may still air on the original television network. This occurs predominantly with programs shared between subscription television networks.

=== International ===
Program	New network(s)	Previous network(s)	Date
(United States) The Prodigious Hickey	TV One	Channel 2	1 January
(United Kingdom) Thunderbirds	Channel 2	South Pacific Television	6 January
(United Kingdom) Cockleshell Bay	Channel 2	TV One	13 January
(United States) Don't Eat the Pictures	Channel 2	TV One	3 February
(United States) Popeye and Son	Channel 2	TV One	10 February
(United Kingdom) Rainbow	Channel 2	TV One	18 March
(United Kingdom) The Raggy Dolls	Channel 2	TV One	20 March
(United States) Zillion Dollar Adventures	Channel 2	TV One	22 March
(United Kingdom) Roobarb	Channel 2	TV One	31 March
(United States) The Jetsons	Channel 2	TV One	2 April
(Japan) Grimm's Fairy Tale Classics	TV3	Channel 2	7 April
(United Kingdom) / (United States) Jim Henson's Mother Goose Stories	Channel 2	TV One	12 May
(Canada) / (France) Babar	Channel 2	TV One	18 June
(United States) Huckleberry Hound	Channel 2	TV One	24 June
(United States) My Little Pony	Channel 2	TV One	6 July
(Australia) / (United States) The Berenstain Bears (1985)	Channel 2	TV One	7 July
(United Kingdom) Capital City	TV One	Channel 2	11 July
(United States) Roger Ramjet	Channel 2	TV One	28 July
(United Kingdom) Colin's Sandwich	CTV	TV One	5 August
(United Kingdom) Chocky	CTV	TV3	7 August
(United Kingdom) Just Good Friends	CTV	Channel 2	7 August
(United Kingdom) Who Sir? Me Sir?	CTV	TV One	9 August
(United States) / (Japan) ThunderCats (1985)	CTV	TV One	11 August
(United States) AlfTales	CTV	Channel 2	11 August
(United Kingdom) Rupert the Bear	Channel 2	TV One	12 August
(United Kingdom) The Gemini Factor	CTV	Channel 2	13 September
(United Kingdom) Chocky's Children	CTV	TV3	18 September
(United States) The Houndcats	Channel 2	NZBC	28 September
(United States) Cartoon All-Stars to the Rescue	TV3	TV One	14 October
(United States) Scruples	TV One	Channel 2	17 October
(United Kingdom) Terrahawks	Channel 2	TV One	9 November
(United Kingdom) Chocky's Challenge	CTV	TV3	13 November
(United States) Kidsongs: The Television Show	Channel 2	TV One	9 December
(United Kingdom) The Fall and Rise of Reginald Perrin	TV One	Channel 2	1991

== Subscription television ==
=== International ===
Program	Channel	Debut date
(United States) The Ruff and Reddy Show	Sky Movies	1991

=== Subscription premieres ===
This is a list of programs which made their premiere on New Zealand subscription television that had previously premiered on New Zealand free-to-air television. Programs may still air on the original free-to-air television network.

==== International ====
Program	Subscription network	Free-to-air network	Date
(United States) The Road Runner Show	Sky Movies	NZBC, TV One, Channel 2	1991
(United States) Merrie Melodies	Sky Movies	TV One, Channel 2, South Pacific Television	1991
(United States) The Porky Pig Show	Sky Movies	TV One, Channel 2	1991

== Television shows ==
- What Now (1981–present)
- Blind Date (1989–1991)
- The Early Bird Show (1989–1992)
- Shark in the Park (1989–1991)
- After 2 (1989–1991)
- New Zealand's Funniest Home Videos (1990–1993)
- 60 Minutes (1990–present)
- The Boy from Andromeda (1991)
- The Ralston Group (1991–1994)
- Wheel of Fortune (1991–1996)

== Ending this year ==
- August - Blind Date (Channel 2) (1989–1991)
- 7 December - The Breakfast Club (1989–1991)
- 18 December - Shark in the Park (TV One) (1989–1991)
- Krypton Factor (Channel 2 (1987–1991)
- After 2 (Channel 2) (1989–1991)
- A Question of Sport (TV One) (1988–1991)

== Births ==
- 4 January - Olivia Tennet, Shortland Street actress and dancer
- 27 January - Beth Chote, actress

== Deaths ==
- 7 August - Billy T. James, comedian, 43 (heart failure)
