= 2004 in New Zealand television =

This is a list of New Zealand television-related events from 2004.

== Events ==
- January–February - The New Zealand version of Pop Idol debuts on TV2.
- 10 May - Ben Lummis wins the first series of New Zealand Idol.
- 22 September - bro'Town the very first New Zealand animated comedy series for adults premieres on TV3.
- Long running British children's animated series Peppa Pig begins airing in New Zealand for the very first time on TV3.
- American animated sitcom The Simpsons switches over to air on TV3.

== Debuts ==
=== Domestic ===
- January - New Zealand Idol (TV2) (2004-2006)
- 22 March - Studio 2 LIVE (TV2) (2004-2010)
- 22 September - bro'Town (TV3) (2004-2009)
- 2 November- Close Up (TV One) (2004-2012)
- Unknown - The Insider's Guide To Happiness (2004)
- Unknown - Border Patrol (TV One) (2004-present)

=== International ===
- Unknown - (Canada) The Berenstain Bears (2003) (TV3)
- Unknown - (United Kingdom) Peppa Pig (TV3)
- Unknown - (Italy) Winx Club (TV3)
- Unknown - (United States) Duck Dodgers (TV2)
- Unknown - (Japan) Transformers: Energon (TV2)
- Unknown - (United States) Lilo & Stitch: The Series (TV2)
- Unknown - (United Kingdom) Little Red Tractor (TV3)
- Unknown - (United States) Joan of Arcadia (TV3)
- Unknown - (Japan) Astro Boy (2003) (TV3)
- Unknown - (United States) The Pitts (TV3)
- Unknown - (United States) The O.C. (TV2)
- Unknown - (United States) Happy Family (TV2)
- Unknown - (United States) One Tree Hill (TV2)
- Unknown - (United States) Two and a Half Men (TV2)
- Unknown - (United States) Queer Eye for the Straight Girl (TV2)
- Unknown - (United States) Dream Job (TV2)
- Unknown - (United States) Bridezillas (TV2)
- Unknown - (United States) Xiaolin Showdown (TV2)
- Unknown - (United States) Jake 2.0 (TV3)
- Unknown - (United States) Survivor: All-Stars (TV2)
- Unknown - (France) Ratz (TV3)

== Changes to network affiliation ==
This is a list of programs which made their premiere on a New Zealand television network that had previously premiered on another New Zealand television network. The networks involved in the switch of allegiances are predominantly both free-to-air networks or both subscription television networks. Programs that have their free-to-air/subscription television premiere, after previously premiering on the opposite platform (free-to air to subscription/subscription to free-to air) are not included. In some cases, programs may still air on the original television network. This occurs predominantly with programs shared between subscription television networks.

=== International ===
Program	New network(s)	Previous network(s)	Date
(United States) The Simpsons	TV3	TV2	2004
(United States) Rocko's Modern Life	TV3	TV2	2004

== Television shows ==
=== 1980s ===
- What Now (1981-present)

=== 1990s ===
- 60 Minutes (1990-present)
- Shortland Street (1992-present)
- Squirt (1996-2006)
- Breakfast (1997-present)
- Target (1999-2013)
- Mitre 10 Dream Home (1999-present)

=== 2000s ===
- Street Legal (2000-2005)
- Piha Rescue (2001, 2003–2017)
- My House My Castle (2001-2009 2011)
- Police Ten 7 (2002-present)
- Sticky TV (2002-2017)
- Eating Media Lunch (2003-2008)

== Ending this year ==
- 19 March - Mercy Peak (TV One) (2001-2004)
- November - Holmes (TV One (1989-2004)
