= 1997 in New Zealand television =

This is a list of New Zealand television events and premieres that occurred in 1997, the 38th year of continuous operation of television in New Zealand.

== Events ==
- 1 January – Cartoon Network shifted from HBO to Orange running from 6am to 4pm daily. HBO extended its transmission hours and started playing 24 hours a day.
- 29 June – The fourth television channel TV4 launches.
- 30 June – TVNZ shuts down Horizon Pacific Television.
- 11 August – TVNZ launches Breakfast with hosts Mike Hosking and Susan Wood.
- CanWest takes full ownership of TV3.
- American animated comedy series King of the Hill is transmitted on TV3.
- After a decade of appearing on multiple programmes, beloved children's television icon Thingee is retired from New Zealand television.

== Debuts ==
=== Domestic ===
- March – McDonald's Young Entertainers (TV2) (1997–1999)
- 11 August – Breakfast (TV One) (1997–present)
- 1 October – Duggan (TV One) (1997–1999)
- Treasure Island (TVNZ) (1997–present)

=== International ===
- 15 July – (United Kingdom) The Story of Bean (TV One)
- (United States) Cow and Chicken (TV2)
- (United Kingdom) Full Circle with Michael Palin (TV One)
- (United States) Buffy the Vampire Slayer (TV3)
- (United States) Strange Universe (TV2)
- (United States) Nick Freno: Licensed Teacher (TV2)
- (United States) Bump in the Night (TV2)
- (United States) Hey Arnold! (TV2)
- (United States) Suddenly Susan (TV3)
- (United States) King of the Hill (TV3)
- (United States) Pandora's Clock (TV3)
- (United States) Sabrina the Teenage Witch (TV3)
- (United Kingdom) Monty the Dog (TV One)

== Subscription television ==
=== Subscription premieres ===
This is a list of programs which made their premiere on New Zealand subscription television that had previously premiered on New Zealand free-to-air television. Programs may still air on the original free-to-air television network.

==== International ====
Program	Subscription network	Free-to-air network	Date
(United States) The Flintstones	Cartoon Network	TV2	1997
(United States) Tom and Jerry	Cartoon Network	TV2	1997
(United States) The All-New Popeye Show	Cartoon Network	TV One, TV2	1997

== Changes to network affiliation ==
This is a list of programs which made their premiere on a New Zealand television network that had previously premiered on another New Zealand television network. The networks involved in the switch of allegiances are predominantly both free-to-air networks or both subscription television networks. Programs that have their free-to-air/subscription television premiere, after previously premiering on the opposite platform (free-to air to subscription/subscription to free-to air) are not included. In some cases, programs may still air on the original television network. This occurs predominantly with programs shared between subscription television networks.

=== Domestic ===
Program	New network(s)	Previous network(s)	Date
Squirt	TV2	TV3	1997

=== International ===
Program	New network(s)	Previous network(s)	Date
(United States) The Bold and the Beautiful	TV One	TV2	21 July
(Australia) Neighbours	TV4	TV One	1997
(United Kingdom) Thomas the Tank Engine and Friends	TV3	TV One	1997

== New channels ==
=== Free for air ===
- 29 June – TV4

=== Cable ===
- 1 January – Cartoon Network
- Unknown - Sky Sport 2

== Television shows ==
- What Now (1981–present)
- Letter to Blanchy (1989, 1994–1997)
- Shortland Street (1992–present)
- You and Me (1993–1998)
- Squirt (1996–2006)
- City Life (1996–1998)
- Breakfast (1997–present)
- McDonald's Young Entertainers (1997–1999)

== Ending this year ==
- Letter to Blanchy (TV One/TV3) (1994–1997)
