= 2005 in New Zealand television =

This is a list of New Zealand television-related events from 2005.

== Events ==
- 20 June - Rugby player Norm Hewitt and his partner Carol-Ann Hickmore win the first series of Dancing with the Stars.
- 17 October - Rosita Vai wins the second series of New Zealand Idol.
- American animated sitcom American Dad! begins airing on TV3.

== Debuts ==
=== Domestic ===
- 21 March - Campbell Live (TV3) (2005-2015)
- 1 May - Dancing with the Stars (TV One) (2005-2009, 2015)
- The Unauthorised History of New Zealand (TVNZ) (2005-2009)
- Downsize Me! (TV3) (2005-2007)
- Ghost Hunt (TV2) (2005-2006)
- Kiwifruit (TVNZ) (2005-2006)

=== International ===
- 7 July - (United Kingdom) Doctor Who (2005) (Prime)
- (United States) Krypto the Superdog (TV2)
- (Australia) Blue Water High (TV2)
- (United States) Justice League Unlimited (TV2)
- (Australia) Silversun (TV One)
- (United States) American Dragon: Jake Long (TV2)
- (United Kingdom) Fifi and the Flowertots (TV2)
- (United States) American Dad! (TV3)
- (United Kingdom) Bob the Builder: Project Build It! (TV3)
- (Japan) Transformers: Cybertron (TV2)
- (United States) The Batman (TV2)
- (Australia) Foreign Exchange (TV One)
- (United States) Trollz (TV2)
- (Canada) / (France) The Tofus (TV2)
- (United States) Brandy & Mr. Whiskers (TV2)
- (United States) Lost (TV2)
- (Japan) Pokémon Chronicles (TV2)
- (United Kingdom) The Robinsons (TV One)
- (Scotland) Shoebox Zoo (TV One)
- (Australia) Noah and Saskia (TV2)
- (United Kingdom) Scrappy Races (TV4)
- (United Kingdom) Boohbah (TV3)

== Changes to network affiliation ==
This is a list of programs which made their premiere on a New Zealand television network that had previously premiered on another New Zealand television network. The networks involved in the switch of allegiances are predominantly both free-to-air networks or both subscription television networks. Programs that have their free-to-air/subscription television premiere, after previously premiering on the opposite platform (free-to air to subscription/subscription to free-to air) are not included. In some cases, programs may still air on the original television network. This occurs predominantly with programs shared between subscription television networks.

=== Domestic ===
Program	New network(s)	Previous network(s)	Date
20/20	TV2	TV3	2005

== Television shows ==
=== 1980s ===
- What Now (1981-present)

=== 1990s ===
- 60 Minutes (1990-present)
- Shortland Street (1992-present)
- Breakfast (1997-present)
- Target (1999-2013)
- Mitre 10 Dream Home (1999-present)

=== 2000s ===
- Street Legal (2000-2005)
- Piha Rescue (2001, 2003–2017)
- My House My Castle (2001-2009 2011)
- Police Ten 7 (2002-present)
- Sticky TV (2002-2017)
- Eating Media Lunch (2003-2008)
- bro'Town (2004-2009)
- Saturday Disney (2004-2006)
- New Zealand Idol (2004-2006)
- Border Patrol (2004-present)
- Studio 2 LIVE (2004-2010)
- Kiwifruit (2005-2006)
- Campbell Live (2005-2015)
- Dancing with the Stars (2005-2009, 2015)

== Ending this year ==
- 17 November - New Zealand's Top 100 History Makers (2005)
- December - Frontier of Dreams (2005)
