= 1989 in New Zealand television =

This is a list of New Zealand television-related events in 1989.

== Events ==
- October – Network Two is renamed to Channel 2.
- 26 November – TV3 is launched in New Zealand.
- 27 November – American children's animated series Teenage Mutant Ninja Turtles based on the comic book series by Kevin Eastman and Peter Laird begins airing on TV3.
- 2 December – American sitcom Family Matters begins premiering on New Zealand television on TV3 three months after its US television debut.
- 5 December – Australian soap Home and Away makes its ever debut in New Zealand with the series transmitting on TV3.
- 8 December – The final editions of Top Half (Auckland) and Today Tonight (Wellington) were broadcast on Channel 2 at 5.45pm.

== Debuts ==
=== Domestic ===
- 13 February – After 2 (Network Two) (1989-1991)
- 13 February – 3:45 Live (Network Two) (1989-1990)
- 3 April – Holmes (TV One) (1989-2004)
- 3 April – Sale of the Century (Network Two) (1989-1993)
- 5 April – Shark in the Park (TV One) (1989-1991)
- 18 June – Strangers (Network Two) (1989)
- 9 July – The Shadow Trader (Network Two) (1989)
- 15 July - Space Knights (Channel 2) (1989)
- 10 September - Night of the Red Hunter (1989)
- 30 October – Blind Date (Channel 2) (1989-1991)
- 27 November – The Early Bird Show (TV3) (1989-1992)
- 14 Days on Trial (Channel 2) (1989-1990)
- Your Choice (Channel 2) (1989)

=== International ===
- 8 January – (United States) Probe (Network Two)
- 13 January – (United Kingdom) The Survival Factor (Network Two)
- 12 February – (Canada) The Adventures of Snelgrove Snail (TV One)
- 12 February – (United Kingdom) TUGS (TV One)
- 1 April – (United States) TV 101 (Network Two)
- 1 April – (United States) AlfTales (TV One)
- 5 April – (United States) Dear John (USA) (Network Two)
- 5 April – (United Kingdom) No Frills (TV One)
- 6 April – (United Kingdom) Stoppit and Tidyup (TV One)
- 7 April – (United States) Mission: Impossible (1988) (Network Two)
- 27 April – (United Kingdom) Count Duckula (Channel 2)
- 29 April – (United Kingdom) Saturday Night Clive (TV One)
- 7 May – (United Kingdom) Tube Mice (TV One)
- 7 May – (United Kingdom) Tumbledown Farm (TV One)
- 16 May – (United Kingdom) Charlie Chalk (TV One)
- 2 July – (United Kingdom) Gran (TV One)
- 1 September – (United States) Hello Kitty's Furry Tale Theater (TV One)
- 3 September – (United States) A Pup Named Scooby-Doo (TV One)
- 27 November – (United States) Garfield and Friends (TV3)
- 27 November – (United States) The Mickey Mouse Club (1989) (TV3)
- 27 November – (United States) Teenage Mutant Ninja Turtles (1987) (TV3)
- 27 November – (Australia) The Shiralee (TV3)
- 28 November – (United States) The Nutt House (TV3)
- 1 December – (United States) In the Heat of the Night (TV3)
- 2 December – (United States) Mighty Mouse and Friends (TV3)
- 2 December – (United States) Family Matters (TV3)
- 2 December – (United States) Midnight Caller (TV3)
- 2 December – (United States) High Mountain Rangers (TV3)
- 3 December – (United States) Murphy Brown (TV3)
- 5 December – (Australia) Home and Away (TV3)
- 7 December – (United States) Houston Knights (TV3)
- 8 December – (United States) Empty Nest (TV3)
- 8 December – (Australia) Hey Dad..! (TV3)
- 8 December – (Australia) Rafferty's Rules (TV3)
- (United States) Nightingales (Channel 2)
- (United Kingdom) Surgical Spirit (TV One)
- (United States) Island Son (Channel 2)
- (United Kingdom) A Bit of a Do (TV One)
- (United Kingdom) Colin's Sandwich (TV One)
- (United States) China Beach (Channel 2)
- (United Kingdom) Streets Apart (TV One)
- (United States) Doctor Doctor (Channel 2)
- (United Kingdom) Gruey (Channel 2)
- (United States) Unsub (Channel 2)
- (United Kingdom) Joint Account (TV One)
- (United States) Day by Day (Channel 2)
- (United States) Annie McGuire (Channel 2)
- (United Kingdom) Rockliffe's Folly (TV One)
- (United States) Paradise (Channel 2)
- (United Kingdom) Hannay (TV One)
- (Australia) Dadah Is Death (Channel 2)
- (United States) Baby Boom (Channel 2)
- (Australia) The Comedy Company (Channel 2)
- (United States) / (France) Denver, the Last Dinosaur (Channel 2)
- (United Kingdom) Round the Bend (Channel 2)
- (United States) Hothouse (Channel 2)
- (United Kingdom) / (United States) Jim Henson's Mother Goose Stories (Channel 2)

== New channels ==
- 26 November – TV3

== Changes to network affiliation ==
This is a list of programs which made their premiere on a New Zealand television network that had previously premiered on another New Zealand television network. The networks involved in the switch of allegiances are predominantly both free-to-air networks or both subscription television networks. Programs that have their free-to-air/subscription television premiere, after previously premiering on the opposite platform (free-to air to subscription/subscription to free-to air) are not included. In some cases, programs may still air on the original television network. This occurs predominantly with programs shared between subscription television networks.

=== Domestic ===
Program	New network(s)	Previous network(s)	Date
What Now	Channel 2	TV One	1989
Sale of the Century	TV One	Channel 2	1989

=== International ===
Program	New network(s)	Previous network(s)	Date
(Canada) Tales of the Wizard of Oz	TV One	Channel 2	17 March
(United Kingdom) Postman Pat	TV One	Channel 2	15 August
(United States) Frank's Place	Channel 2	TV One	22 October
(United Kingdom) TUGS	Channel 2	TV One	18 November
(United States) DuckTales	TV3	Channel 2	27 November
(United States) The Wuzzles	TV3	TV One	27 November
(United States) Walt Disney's Mickey and Donald	TV3	TV One	2 December
(United States) / (Belgium) The Smurfs	Channel 2	TV One	1989
(United Kingdom) The Adventures of Parsley	TV One	Channel 2	1989
(United Kingdom) Rainbow	Channel 2	TV One	1989
(Australia) Mother and Son	Channel 2	TV One	1989

== Television shows ==
- Play School (1972–1990)
- University Challenge (1976–1989, 2014–present)
- What Now (1981–present)
- Gloss (1987–1990)
- Betty's Bunch (1989)
- Blind Date (1989–1991)
- The Early Bird Show (1989–1992)
- Shark in the Park (1989–1992)
- After 2 (1989–1991)
- 3:45 Live (1989–1990)

== Ending this year ==
- 16 April – Worzel Gummidge Down Under (also United Kingdom) (1987–1989)
- 5 November – University Challenge (1976–1989, 2014–present)
- Betty's Bunch (1989)
