= 2008 in New Zealand television =

This is a list of New Zealand television events and premieres that occurred in 2008, the 49th year of continuous operation of television in New Zealand.

== Events ==
- 15 April - The former Silver Fern Temepara George and her partner Stefano Olivieri win the fourth series of Dancing with the Stars.
- 22 April - Debut of Stars in Their Eyes, a series hosted by Simon Barnett in which members of the public impersonate their favourite singers.
- 24 June - The first series of Stars in Their Eyes is won by Deryn Trainer performing as Billy Joel.
- 29 October - 16-year-old dancer Chaz Cummings wins the first series of New Zealand's Got Talent

== Premieres ==
=== Domestic ===
- 22 April - Stars in Their Eyes (TV One) (2008-2009)
- 2 July - Burying Brian (TV One) (2008)
- 8 September - New Zealand's Got Talent (Prime) (2008-2013)

=== International ===
- 19 June - (United States) Army Wives (TV2)
- 21 October - (United States) Lipstick Jungle (TV3)
- (United States) Tom and Jerry Tales (TV2)
- (United Kingdom) Roary the Racing Car (TV2)
- (United States) Squirrel Boy (TV2)
- (United States) / (Japan) Transformers: Animated (TV2)

== Television shows ==
=== 1980s ===
- What Now (1981-present)

=== 1990s ===
- 60 Minutes (1990-present)
- Shortland Street (1992-present)
- Breakfast (1997-present)
- Target (1999-2013)
- Mitre 10 Dream Home (1999-present)

=== 2000s ===
- Piha Rescue (2001, 2003–2017)
- My House My Castle (2001-2009 2011)
- Police Ten 7 (2002-2023)
- Sticky TV (2002-2017)
- Eating Media Lunch (2003-2008)
- bro'Town (2004-2009)
- Border Patrol (2004-present)
- Studio 2 LIVE (2004-2010)
- Campbell Live (2005-2015)
- Dancing with the Stars (2005-2009)
- Sparkle Friends (2006-2011)

== Channels ==
Launches:

- 28 March: Te Reo
- 30 March: TVNZ 7
- 1 October: Country TV
