= Kiwifruit (TV series) =

- Starring: Amanda Rees; Kevin Alexander; Matu Ngaropo
- Country of origin: New Zealand
- No. of episodes: 50

Production
- Running time: 25 minutes

Original release
- Network: TVNZ
- Release: 2005 – 2006

Kiwifruit is a New Zealand magazine style talk show series that dealt with gay and lesbian issues. It was produced by CreamTV and shown on Television New Zealand's TV2.

The show was commissioned for an original 10-episode run in 2005, to find a replacement to long-running QueerNation, which was coming to an end. It was set to compete with The OUTHouse. After showing both The OutHouse and Kiwifruit, it was decided that Kiwifruit would get the 40-episode contract.

== Criticism ==
When the programme started airing in 2005, it was met with negative feedback from the gay community. This was confirmed when in a NZ on Air commissioned LGBT survey found that 70% of the respondents disliked the show. Some of the respondents found the show shallow, superficial and offensive.

Presenter Amanda Rees responded to the report, saying "We think that their criticism of the show being 'lightweight' was appropriate for the episode or two that screened around the time of the research." She also said that they receive a lot of positive feedback regarding the show, and when covering serious issues they get lower ratings than normal.

The show was renewed for a further series in 2006.

== See also ==
- Kiwifruit
- LGBT in New Zealand
- New Zealand television
