= Casey-Lee Jolleys =

British actress, dancer and performer (born 1974)

Casey-Lee Jolleys (born 1974) is a British actress, dancer and performer.

Originally from Billinge in Wigan, Greater Manchester, Jolleys began performing at an early age and by the age of nine, had become a three-time world champion in ballet, tap and modern dance styles, making television appearances in the process.

By the late 1980s, she was a co-presenter of the BBC Saturday morning children's programme It's Wicked! (produced by BBC North West) and was appearing as Annie Mappin in the BBC comedy-drama series Gruey and the sequel, Gruey Twoey.

Jolleys returned to presenting as a continuity presenter for Channel 5's pre-school children's programming strand Milkshake!, and also appeared as Jenny in the Milkshake! series Beachcomber Bay.

In 2004 and 2006, Jolleys appeared in the guest role of Stacy Hilton (aka Orchid) in the long running ITV soap Coronation Street. For this, she won a Heritage Award for Best Comedy Performance in a Soap Opera.

Jolleys began a dance, drama, singing and comedy academy in Bolton, alongside comedian Bobby Ball, who subsequently left the school.

In 2013, Jolleys starred in the BBC comedy-drama Being Eileen.
