= Ronald Karaitiana =

New Zealand cricketer (born 1987)

Ronald Punaoteaoranga Christopher Karaitiana (born 3 December 1987 in Masterton, New Zealand) is a New Zealand cricketer who played in the 2006 U-19 Cricket World Cup in Sri Lanka. He also made five one-day cricket appearances for Wellington Firebirds in 2008–09, scoring thirteen runs and claiming three wickets.

In 1997, aged nine, Karaitiana won the reality television series McDonald's Young Entertainers.
