= 1996 in New Zealand television =

This is a list of New Zealand television events and premieres that occurred in 1996, the 37th year of continuous operation of television in New Zealand.

== Events ==
- 2 February – After a long absence, the popular Australian children's television series Johnson and Friends returns to New Zealand television with the series now airing on TV One.
- 20 February – The second series of Johnson and Friends began airing on New Zealand television for the very first time on TV One.
- 11 March – The third series of Johnson and Friends was shown for the first time in New Zealand as it went to air on TV One (The third series itself was also filmed in New Zealand at Avalon Studios in Avalon).
- 14 March – Journalist Carol Hirschfeld took over as presenter of TV One's investigative news and current affairs programme Assignment.
- 24 May - New Zealand game show Wheel of Fortune airs for the last time on TV2.
- 15 July – New Zealand soap opera City Life premiered on TV2.
- 19 July – Australian soap opera Neighbours screened on TVNZ's TV One for the last time. The soap was picked up by TV4 a year later and ran from 1997 until 2000. It returned to TVNZ in 2002 and has been broadcasting on TV2 since.
- 20 July – TV One adopted new sans serif logo, replacing the Friz Quadranta which had been in use since 1987.
- 20 July – The 1996 Summer Olympics were held in Atlanta, Georgia, United States, where New Zealand won 3 gold medals, 2 silver medals, and 1 bronze medal.
- 31 August – New Zealand children's television show produced in Dunedin Squirt debuted on TV3. Within the next year, it moved to TV2.
- 1 November - Cartoon Network screened for the first time on HBO running from 6am to 4pm daily. HBO extended its transmission hours and ran from 4pm until Cartoon Network resumed at 6am the following day.

== Debuts ==
=== Domestic ===
- 15 July – City Life (TV2) (1996–1998)
- 31 August – Squirt (TV3) (1996–2006)

=== International ===
- 3 January – (United States) The Single Guy (TV2)
- 4 January – (United Kingdom) The Final Cut (TV One)
- 19 January – (United States) Brotherly Love (TV3)
- 19 January – (United States) Weird Science (TV3)
- 2 February – (United States) / (New Zealand) Hercules: The Legendary Journeys (TV3)
- 5 February – (United States) JAG (TV2)
- 12 February – (United States) Nowhere Man (TV3)
- 13 February – (United States) American Gothic (TV3)
- 20 February – (United States) Caroline in the City (TV2)
- 26 February – (United States) Burke's Law (TV3)
- 9 March – (United Kingdom) Pets Win Prizes (TV2)
- 18 March – (United States) Gargoyles (TV3)
- 22 March – (United States) New York Undercover (TV3)
- 25 March – (United States) Central Park West (TV3)
- 15 April – (United States) Murder One (TV3)
- 2 April – (United States) 3rd Rock from the Sun (TV3)
- 29 April – (Australia) Water Rats (TV2)
- 5 June – (United States) Star Trek: Voyager (TV3)
- 19 June – (United States) / (New Zealand) Xena: Warrior Princess (TV3)
- 7 August – (United States) Savannah (TV3)
- 14 August – (Australia) Sex/Life (TV3)
- 19 August – (United States) Almost Perfect (TV2)
- 19 August – (United States) Ned and Stacey (TV2)
- 30 October – (United Kingdom) Doctor Who: The Movie (TV2)
- 16 December – (United Kingdom) William's Wish Wellingtons (TV One)
- (United States) Wishbone (TV One)

== Changes to network affiliation ==
This is a list of programs which made their premiere on a New Zealand television network that had previously premiered on another New Zealand television network. The networks involved in the switch of allegiances are predominantly both free-to-air networks or both subscription television networks. Programs that have their free-to-air/subscription television premiere, after previously premiering on the opposite platform (free-to air to subscription/subscription to free-to air) are not included. In some cases, programs may still air on the original television network. This occurs predominantly with programs shared between subscription television networks.

=== International ===
Program	New network(s)	Previous network(s)	Date
(Australia) Johnson and Friends	TV One	TV2	2 February
(United States) Beakman's World	TV One	TV2	15 February
(United States) Grace Under Fire	TV3	TV2	13 August
(United Kingdom) EastEnders	TV One	TV2	1996
(United Kingdom) Noddy and Father Christmas	TV One	TV2	1996
(United Kingdom) Mole's Christmas	TV One	TV2	1996
(United States) Baywatch	TV3	TV2	1996
(United Kingdom) Howards' Way	TV2	TV One	1996

== Television shows ==
- No information on television shows this year.

== Ending this year ==
- Wheel of Fortune (TV2) (1991–1996)
