= 2013 in New Zealand television =

This is a list of New Zealand television events and premieres that occurred in 2013, the 54rd year of continuous operation of television in New Zealand.

== Events ==
- 21 April - Launch of the New Zealand version of The X Factor.
- 22 July - Jackie Thomas wins the first series of The X Factor.
- 20 December – After negotiations fell through with United States distribution company, 20th Century Fox, MediaWorks New Zealand announces a new but somewhat limited deal, has been reached between MediaWorks and 20th Century Fox. However, due to the length of time the negotiation took, other television networks (both free to air and subscription) obtained the rights to some of the primetime shows from TV3 and Four.
- 8 December - 22-year-old singer Renee Maurice wins the third series of New Zealand's Got Talent.

== Premieres ==
=== Domestic series ===
Domestic television series premieres on New Zealand television in 2013
Program	Original airdate	Network	Ref
Agent Anna	31 January	TV One	
Seven Sharp	4 February	TV One	
The Blue Rose	4 February	TV3	
The X Factor	21 April	TV3	
Best Bits	19 July	TV One	

=== International series ===
International television series premieres on New Zealand television in 2013
Program	Original airdate	Network	Country of origin	Ref
Everything's Rosie	11 February	TV2	United Kingdom	
Chicago Fire	9 July	TV3	United States	
The Fall	29 August	SoHo	Ireland, United Kingdom	
Big Brother Australia	25 November	TV3	Australia	
Tickety Toc	TBA	Four	United Kingdom, United States, South Korea	
DreamWorks Dragons	TBA	Four	United States	
Daniel Tiger's Neighborhood	TBA	TVNZ Kidzone	United States, Canada	
Oh No! It's an Alien Invasion	TBA	Four	Canada	
The Amazing World of Gumball	TBA	TV2	United Kingdom, United States, Ireland	
Mako Mermaids	TBA	TV2	Australia	

=== Telemovies and miniseries ===
Domestic television telemovie and miniseries premieres on New Zealand television in 2013
Program	Original airdate	Network	Ref

=== Documentaries ===
Domestic television documentary premieres on New Zealand television in 2013
Program	Original airdate(s)	Network	Ref

=== Specials ===
Domestic television special premieres on New Zealand television in 2013
Program	Original airdate(s)	Network(s)	Ref

== Programming changes ==
=== Programmes changing networks ===
Criterion for inclusion in the following list is that New Zealand premiere episodes will air in New Zealand for the first time on the new network. This includes when a program is moved from a free-to-air network's primary channel to a digital multi-channel, as well as when a program moves between subscription television channels – provided the preceding criterion is met. Ended television series which change networks for repeat broadcasts are not included in the list.

Domestic television series which changed network affiliation in 2013
Programme	Date	New network	Previous network	Ref

International television programmes which changed channel/network in 2013
Programme	Date	New network	Previous network	Country of origin	Ref
Home and Away	19 August	TV2	TV3	Australia	
Big Brother Australia	25 November	TV3	Prime	Australia	

=== Free-to-air premieres ===
This is a list of programmes which made their premiere on New Zealand free-to-air television that had previously premiered on New Zealand subscription television. Programs may still air on the original subscription television network.

Programme	Date	Free-to-air network	Subscription network(s)	Country of origin	Ref

=== Subscription premieres ===
This is a list of programmes which made their premiere on New Zealand subscription television that had previously premiered on New Zealand free-to-air television. Programmes may still air on the original free-to-air television network.

International television series that premiered on New Zealand free-to-air television in 2013
Programme	Date	Free-to-air network	Subscription network(s)	Country of origin	Ref

=== Programmes returning in 2013 ===
Returning programmes on New Zealand television in 2013
Programme	Return date	Network	Original run	Ref

=== Milestone episodes in 2013 ===
Domestic television series which have reached a milestone in 2013
Show	Network	Episode #	Episode title	Episode air date	Source

=== Programmes ending in 2013 ===
Domestic programmes ending on New Zealand television in 2013
Programme	End date	Network	Start date	Ref
The Blue Rose	29 April	TV3	4 February	
Go Girls	16 July	TV3	19 February 2009	
The Almighty Johnsons	26 September	TV3	7 February 2011	
The Erin Simpson Show	6 December	TV2	2009	
Nightline	20 December	TV3	1998	

== Channels ==
Launches:

- Unknown: Sky Movies Action
- Unknown: Sky Sport 4

== Deaths ==
Date	Name	Age	Notability	Source
