= Drew Ne'emia =

New Zealand television personality

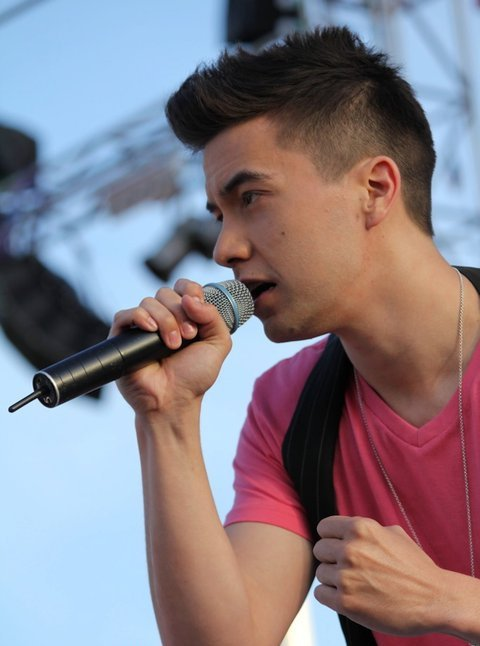
- Born: 28 May 1985 (age 41); Wellington, New Zealand
- Years active: 1988–present
- Television: McDonald's Young Entertainers

Drew Ne'emia (born 28 May 1985) is a New Zealand television presenter and director. In 2022, he announced that his last name is Ne'emia, not Neemia, as had been previously used.

== Early life ==
Ne'emia attended Hutt International Boys' School.

== Career ==
Ne'emia has been involved in the New Zealand entertainment industry since the age of three, doing television advertisements which led the way to various children's television drama series. His first major role was in the television series The Legend of William Tell. He was a Super Trouper in the television series McDonald's Young Entertainers for its duration of three years until 1999.

Ne'emia hosted Sticky TV a kids/teen program, on TV3 from 2006 on which he worked with Sam Wallace, Julia Bloore (née Wright), Erin Simpson and Kanoa Lloyd. He officially left the show on 1 May 2009.

Ne'emia co-hosted Drew and Shannon Live on Four (previously C4) until 2012. Drew and Shannon Live was a popular music and entertainment based show from 4.30 p.m. – 6 p.m. weekdays. Previously Ne'emia hosted 'Select Live' on C4.

As a singer, Ne'emia performed on numerous occasions at Coca-Cola Christmas in the Park.

In 2013, Ne'emia teamed up with New Zealand rap group Smashproof singing the hook on the single "Paint Fade". The song was number 1 on the overall iTunes chart for two weeks. "Paint Fade" went on to make the top 10 on the 'Official New Zealand Top 40' chart, peaking at number 6.

Ne'emia began directing in 2014.

In 2022, Ne'emia was a contestant on the second season of The Masked Singer NZ, where he finished in second place.

== Personal life ==
In 2016, Ne'emia began training with New Zealand heavyweight boxing legend David Tua. In November 2016, he debuted in the boxing ring, winning by unanimous decision. His next bout will be scheduled mid 2017. He has reportedly dedicated his life to martial arts.

In 2022, after being unmasked on The Masked Singer NZ, he announced that his last name is actually Ne'emia.

Drew got married in July 2026.
