= 1993 in New Zealand television =

This is a list of New Zealand television events and premieres that occurred in 1993, the 34th year of continuous operation of television in New Zealand.

== Events ==
- 24 January – TVNZ acquired 60 Minutes from TV3 with its first edition airing on Channel 2.
- 29 March – Long running New Zealand medical soap Shortland Street aired on ITV in Great Britain.
- May – Channel 2 began broadcasting 24 hours on Friday and Saturday nights, running through to closedown on Sunday.
- 12 June – TV3 broadcast a 22-hour Telethon for the Starship Foundation.
- 18 June – The final episode of Sale of the Century aired on TV One.
- 10 July – An Australian-New Zealand-Canadian television series Deepwater Haven began on Channel 2.
- 19 July – Australian soap opera Paradise Beach arrived in New Zealand with the series airing on Channel 2.
- Well known US talk show Sally Jessy Raphael aired in New Zealand for the very first time on TV One.
- Various works from the TVNZ library had been purchased by British entertainment distribution company HIT Entertainment (well known for acquiring rights, producing and distributing children's television series such as Thomas and Friends, Pingu, Fireman Sam, Barney & Friends, The Wiggles, Angelina Ballerina and Bob the Builder).

== Debuts ==
=== Domestic ===
- 10 July – Deepwater Haven (Channel 2) (also Australia and France) (1993)
- Melody Rules (TV3) (1993–1995)
- 20/20 (TV3) (1993–2003, 2005–2014)

=== International ===
- 11 January – (United States) Sally Jesse Raphael (TV One)
- 13 February – (Australia) Melba (TV3)
- 14 February – (Japan) Timberwood Tales (Channel 2)
- 17 February – (United Kingdom) Funny Business (TV3)
- 25 February – (United Kingdom) / (Wales) Funnybones (Channel 2)
- 7 March – (United Kingdom) / (Russia) / (Wales) Shakespeare: The Animated Tales (Channel 2)
- 15 March – (France) / (Canada) The Adventures of Tintin (Channel 2)
- 20 April – (United States) / (Japan) The Adventures of T-Rex (Channel 2)
- 4 May – (United Kingdom) Men Behaving Badly (TV3)
- 7 May – (United States) Swamp Thing (1990) (TV3)
- 7 May – (United States) Defenders of Dynatron City (Channel 2)
- 10 May – (United States) Batman: The Animated Series (Channel 2)
- 13 May – (Australia) / (Italy) The Magistrate (TV One)
- 14 May – (United Kingdom) Absolutely Fabulous (TV One)
- 31 May – (United States) The Young Indiana Jones Chronicles (TV3)
- 3 June – (United Kingdom) The Trouble with Medicine (TV One)
- 5 June – (United States) / (Canada) Eek! The Cat (Channel 2)
- 6 June – (United Kingdom) The Borrowers (Channel 2)
- 10 June – (Australia) Full Frontal (Channel 2)
- 18 July – (United Kingdom) Goggle-Eyes (Channel 2)
- 19 July – (Australia) Paradise Beach (Channel 2)
- 20 July – (United Kingdom) G.B.H. (TV One)
- 25 July – (United States) Morton & Hayes (Channel 2)
- 10 August – (United States) Sisters (Channel 2)
- 18 August – (United Kingdom) 999 (TV One)
- 12 September – (Australia) Joh's Jury (TV One)
- 12 September – (United States) The Astronomers (TV3)
- 18 September – (Australia) Snowy (TV3)
- 23 September – (United States) Wild About Wheels (TV One)
- 28 September – (United Kingdom) The Orchid House (TV One)
- 9 October – (United States) X-Men (Channel 2)
- 11 October – (United States) The Burden of Proof (Channel 2)
- 4 November – (United States) Dr. Quinn, Medicine Woman (Channel 2)
- 8 November – (United States) Billy (Channel 2)
- 28 November – (United States) My Little Pony Tales (Channel 2)
- 11 December – (United States) Biker Mice from Mars (Channel 2)
- 11 December – (United States) / (Canada) Dog City (Channel 2)
- 13 December – (United Kingdom) Juniper Jungle (Channel 2)
- 15 December – (United Kingdom) The Hypnotic World of Paul McKenna (Channel 2)
- (United States) Martin (Channel 2)
- (United States) Code 3 (1992) (Channel 2)
- (United States) Wake, Rattle, and Roll (Channel 2)
- (United Kingdom) Grace & Favour (TV One)
- (United Kingdom) Barrymore (TV One)
- (United Kingdom) Eldorado (TV One)
- (France) / (United States) Heroes on Hot Wheels (Channel 2)
- (Australia) Sylvania Waters (TV One)
- (Australia) The Adventures of Skippy (TV3)
- (France) Saban's Gulliver's Travels Channel 2)
- (France) The Bear's Island (Channel 2)
- (France) Dynamo Duck (Channel 2)
- (United States) Ghostwriter (Channel 2)
- (France) Around the World in 80 Dreams (Channel 2)
- (United States) Melrose Place (TV3)
- (United States) Picket Fences (Channel 2)

== Changes to network affiliation ==
This is a list of programs which made their premiere on a New Zealand television network that had previously premiered on another New Zealand television network. The networks involved in the switch of allegiances are predominantly both free-to-air networks or both subscription television networks. Programs that have their free-to-air/subscription television premiere, after previously premiering on the opposite platform (free-to air to subscription/subscription to free-to air) are not included. In some cases, programs may still air on the original television network. This occurs predominantly with programs shared between subscription television networks.

=== International ===
| Program | New network(s) | Previous network(s) | Date |
|---|---|---|---|
| (United Kingdom) ITN World News | TV One | Channel 2 | 4 January |
| (United Kingdom) Mike and Angelo | TV3 | Channel 2 | 5 November |

=== Subscription premieres ===
This is a list of programs which made their premiere on New Zealand subscription television that had previously premiered on New Zealand free-to-air television. Programs may still air on the original free-to-air television network.

==== International ====
| Program | Subscription network | Free-to-air network | Date |
|---|---|---|---|
| (United States) Here Comes the Grump | Sky Movies | NZBC | 1993 |

== Television shows ==
- No information on television shows this year.

== Ending this year ==
- Sale of the Century (TV One) (1989–1993)
