= The Kal-Q-Lated Risk =

Rock musicians from New Zealand

- Origin: Featherston, New Zealand
- Genres: rock
- Years active: 1967–1974
- Past members: Carl Evenson, William Davidson, Phil Hope, Bernie Carey, Dave Cameron, Barry Rushton, Laki Apelu, Ian Taylor

The Kal-Q-Lated Risk was a musical group from Featherston, New Zealand. The band consists of Ian Taylor (Lead Vocals) replaced by William Davidson in 1971, Phil Hope (Lead Guitar) Bernie Carey (Organ / Vocals), Dave Cameron (Bass Guitar / Vocals) Laki Apelu (Guitar) and Barry Rushton (Drums.) In early 1969, Upper Hutt guitarist Phil Hope replaced Apelu, who had returned to Samoa at short notice.

== Discography ==
=== Albums ===
Year	Title	Label	Peak chart positions	Certifications
1972	Holding Our Own	His Master's Voice HSD.1023	—	

=== Singles ===
Year	Title	Peak chart positions	Album
1970	"I'll Be Home (In A Day Or So)" / "Rachel Rachel"	—	non-Album
1971	"What Makes A Man" / "Julia"	—	
1971	"Angelina" / "Love Child"	16	
1971	"Looking Through The Eyes Of A Beautiful Girl" / "Pixie Rock"	14	
1972	"Touching Me Touching You" / "Hold On"	—	Holding Our Own
1972	"Lady One and Only" / "Misty Eyes"	—	
1972	"Waiting On You" / "Down Inside Me"	—	
1972	"Lazy River" / "Rock'n'Roll Gypsy's"	—	
1973	"21st Birthday Party" / "River Road"	—	
1973	"Clap Your Hands" / "Nikki Hoi"	—	
1974	"Soul Singing Lady" / "Bye Bye"	—	
"—" denotes a recording that did not chart or was not released in that territory.

== Awards ==
- Loxene Golden Disc Award 1970
