= McDonald's Young Entertainers =

New Zealand television series

- Genre: Talent show
- Presented by: Jason Gunn
- Starring: Ainslie Allen; Michelle Ang; Tianna Areaiiti; Ronald Karaitiana; Drew Neemia; Holly Odgers; Jamie Rolton; Adrian Stevanon; Michael Walmsley; Danielle White
- Narrated by: Phil Darkins
- Composer: Terry Gray
- Country of origin: New Zealand
- Original language: English
- No. of seasons: 3
- No. of episodes: 45

Production
- Executive producers: Denis Spencer; Erika Steen
- Producer: Beau Hancock
- Production locations: Avalon Studios, Lower Hutt (1997-1998); Various (1999)
- Running time: 48 minutes (1997-1998); 30 minutes (1999)
- Production companies: Denis Spencer Productions; New Zealand on Air

Original release
- Network: TV2
- Release: 30 March 1997 – 18 September 1999

McDonald's Young Entertainers is a New Zealand talent show that aired on TV2 at 6:30pm on Sundays. It was hosted by Jason Gunn, and endorsed by the McDonald's franchise. The show was inspired by The Mickey Mouse Club. Leigh Evans was a choreographer.

The series was broadcast from 30 March 1997 to 18 September 1999. Many episodes ended with a live cover of "Reach Out and Touch (Somebody's Hand)" by Diana Ross. The show aired with high ratings among young audiences, but was cancelled within two years in late 1999. Independent country artist Ainslie Allen appeared on the show.

== Super Troopers ==
The show featured Jason Gunn as the host and a group of talented young teenagers as a regular troupe of singers and dancers dubbed the Super Troopers. The young talents’ job was to make the three contestants that would appear on the show feel at ease while they were under tight scrutiny from the resident judges, including singer Tina Cross.

The Troopers and the contestants all had to be aged 18 or under in order to be eligible for the show. Jason and the Troopers would open and close each individual episodes with big production numbers, as well as performing cover of various songs during the show, individually or as a group.

=== People from the Super Troopers ===
- Ainslie Allen
- Michelle Ang
- Tianna Areaiiti
- Ronald Karaitiana
- Drew Neemia
- Holly Odgers (née Walmsley)
- Jamie Rolton
- Adrian Stevanon
- Michael Walmsley
- Danielle White

== Featured performers ==
McMillan Bergman was a semi-finalist on the show at age twelve.

The show featured some participants who are now famous, including television personality Drew Neemia, cricketer Ronald Karaitiana, singer Hayley Westenra and actress Michelle Ang. and concert pianist John Chen.

The show has been an inspiration to New Zealand performers.
