= 2009 in New Zealand television =

This is a list of New Zealand television events and premieres that occurred in 2009, the 50th year of continuous operation of television in New Zealand.

== Events ==
- 21 April - The former What Now host and Breakfast weatherman Tāmati Coffey and his partner Samantha Hitchcock win the fifth series of Dancing with the Stars.
- 30 June - Mandy Pickering, performing as Sarah McLachlan wins the second series of Stars in Their Eyes.

== Premieres ==
=== Domestic series ===
Domestic television series premieres on New Zealand television in 2009
Program	Original airdate	Network	Ref
Diplomatic Immunity	10 March	TV One	
Hitched	30 June	TV3	
The Cult	24 September	TV2	
Go Girls	19 February	TV2	

=== International series ===
International television series premieres on New Zealand television in 2009
Program	Original airdate	Network	Country of origin	Ref
Eleventh Hour	23 July	TV One	United States	
MasterChef Australia	31 August	TV One	Australia	
United States of Tara	1 December	TV3	United States	
The Marvelous Misadventures of Flapjack	2009	TV2	United States	
Chuggington	2009	TV2	United Kingdom	

=== Telemovies and miniseries ===
Domestic television telemovie and miniseries premieres on New Zealand television in 2009
Program	Original airdate	Network	Ref

=== Documentaries ===
Domestic television documentary premieres on New Zealand television in 2009
Program	Original airdate(s)	Network	Ref

=== Specials ===
Domestic television special premieres on New Zealand television in 2009
Program	Original airdate(s)	Network(s)	Ref

== Programming changes ==
=== Programmes changing networks ===
Criterion for inclusion in the following list is that New Zealand premiere episodes will air in New Zealand for the first time on the new network. This includes when a program is moved from a free-to-air network's primary channel to a digital multi-channel, as well as when a program moves between subscription television channels – provided the preceding criterion is met. Ended television series which change networks for repeat broadcasts are not included in the list.

Domestic television series which changed network affiliation in 2009
Programme	Date	New network	Previous network	Ref

International television programmes which changed channel/network in 2009
Programme	Date	New network	Previous network	Country of origin	Ref

=== Free-to-air premieres ===
This is a list of programmes which made their premiere on New Zealand free-to-air television that had previously premiered on New Zealand subscription television. Programs may still air on the original subscription television network.

Programme	Date	Free-to-air network	Subscription network(s)	Country of origin	Ref

=== Subscription premieres ===
This is a list of programmes which made their premiere on New Zealand subscription television that had previously premiered on New Zealand free-to-air television. Programmes may still air on the original free-to-air television network.

International television series that premiered on New Zealand free-to-air television in 2014
Programme	Date	Free-to-air network	Subscription network(s)	Country of origin	Ref

=== Programmes returning in 2009 ===
Returning programmes on New Zealand television in 2009
Programme	Return date	Network	Original run	Ref

=== Milestone episodes in 2009 ===
Domestic television series which have reached a milestone in 2009
Show	Network	Episode #	Episode title	Episode air date	Source

=== Programmes ending in 2009 ===
Domestic programmes ending on New Zealand television in 2009
Programme	End date	Network	Start date	Ref

== Deaths ==
Date	Name	Age	Notability	Source
