= The OUTHouse =

- Starring: Greg Mayor; Amanda Betts; Andy Curtis
- Country of origin: New Zealand

Original release
- Network: TVNZ

The OUTHouse was a New Zealand magazine-style talk show series that covered LGBT issues in New Zealand in a comedic manner, hosted by Greg Mayor, Amanda Betts and Andy Curtis.

== See also ==
- LGBT New Zealand
