= Strange Universe =

- Country of origin: United States
- Original language: English

Production
- Running time: 30 minutes
- Production companies: Team Entertainment Group; Rysher Entertainment; Chris-Craft Television Productions; United Entertainment Group

Original release
- Network: Syndicated

Strange Universe was a United States syndicated daily half-hour program about paranormal phenomena that aired from 1996 to 1998. Developed by Rysher Entertainment and Chris Craft Television, it debuted in 1996, hosted by Emmett Miller and Dana Adams. The show was presented in a daily tabloid television format, with the hosts introducing segments on various fortean and New Age topics, sometimes accompanied with interviews.

In February 1997 Adams was dropped as co-host and Miller became the only host. At that point, Variety reported that the show had a "weak" 1.2 national rating over the past two months.

The show was on the air from 1996 to 1998 for a total of 390 episodes. It usually appeared on UPN network affiliates, as Chris-Craft owned half of UPN and their stations carried UPN programming. The series was also syndicated internationally, airing in Canada on Access, The Education Station (currently known as CTV 2 Alberta).

In 1996, for the first time in its broadcast history, it dedicated a full episode to subject of alleged footage from Area 51 of an "alien interview". This was released in 1997 as Area 51: The Alien Interview, directed by Jeff Broadstreet, and starring Steven Williams.
