= Ian Taylor (New Zealand businessman) =

New Zealand television presenter

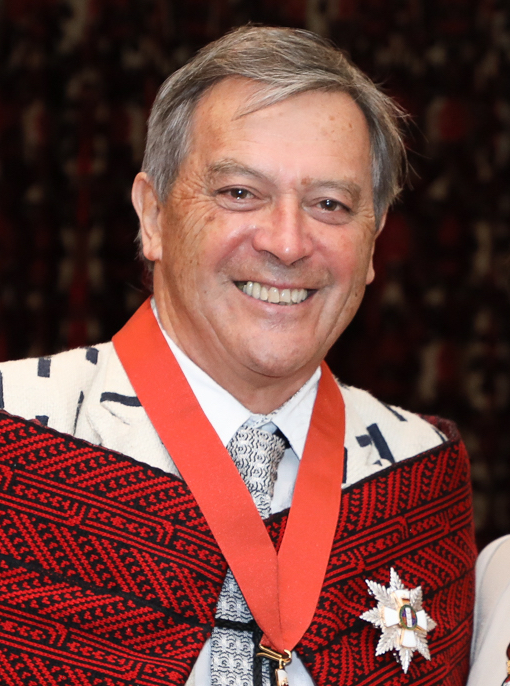
Taylor in 2021

Sir Ian Lemuel Taylor KNZM (born 1949 or 1950) is a New Zealand businessman and former television presenter based in Dunedin.

== Early life and education ==
Born in Kaeo to a Pākehā father and Māori mother, (of Ngāti Kahungunu and Ngā Puhi descent) he grew up in Raupunga and went to a Catholic boarding school in Masterton.

Taylor joined the band The Kal-Q-Lated Risk in c.1967 as lead singer, and later graduated with an LL.B. degree from the University of Otago.

== Business career ==
A former television presenter (notably for TVNZ children's programmes Play School, Spot On and New Zealand's Funniest Home Videos), Taylor founded Taylormade Media in 1989 as a television production company. The following year he established Animation Research Limited, which quickly became one of the top computer animation companies in New Zealand and known internationally for its work, particularly in television advertising and sports graphics. Its sports division/product Virtual Eye, is used in various sports such as for ball-tracking in cricket where it assists umpires with their Decision Review System and informs TV commentators and viewers. During the 2010/11 Ashes series it was known as Eagle Eye.

Taylor was inducted into the New Zealand Technology Hall of Fame in 2009 and was named North & South Magazines 2010 New Zealander of the Year.

== Honours ==
He was awarded an Honorary Fellowship of the Institute of IT Professionals (HFIITP) in 2010 (under its former name New Zealand Computer Society), the top honour of the tech sector in New Zealand.

In the 2012 New Year Honours, Taylor was appointed a Companion of the New Zealand Order of Merit for services to television and business. In 2013 Taylor was named Outstanding Maori Business Leader of the Year.

In May 2014, Taylor was part of a team who were awarded a Sports Emmy under the category "Outstanding New Approaches – Sports Coverage" for development of an innovative mobile application for the 34th America's Cup.

On 13 February 2019, Taylor was named Innovator of the Year at the annual New Zealander of the Year Awards. Awards organisers cited Taylor's business intuition and expertise as an exemplar of innovation in New Zealand.

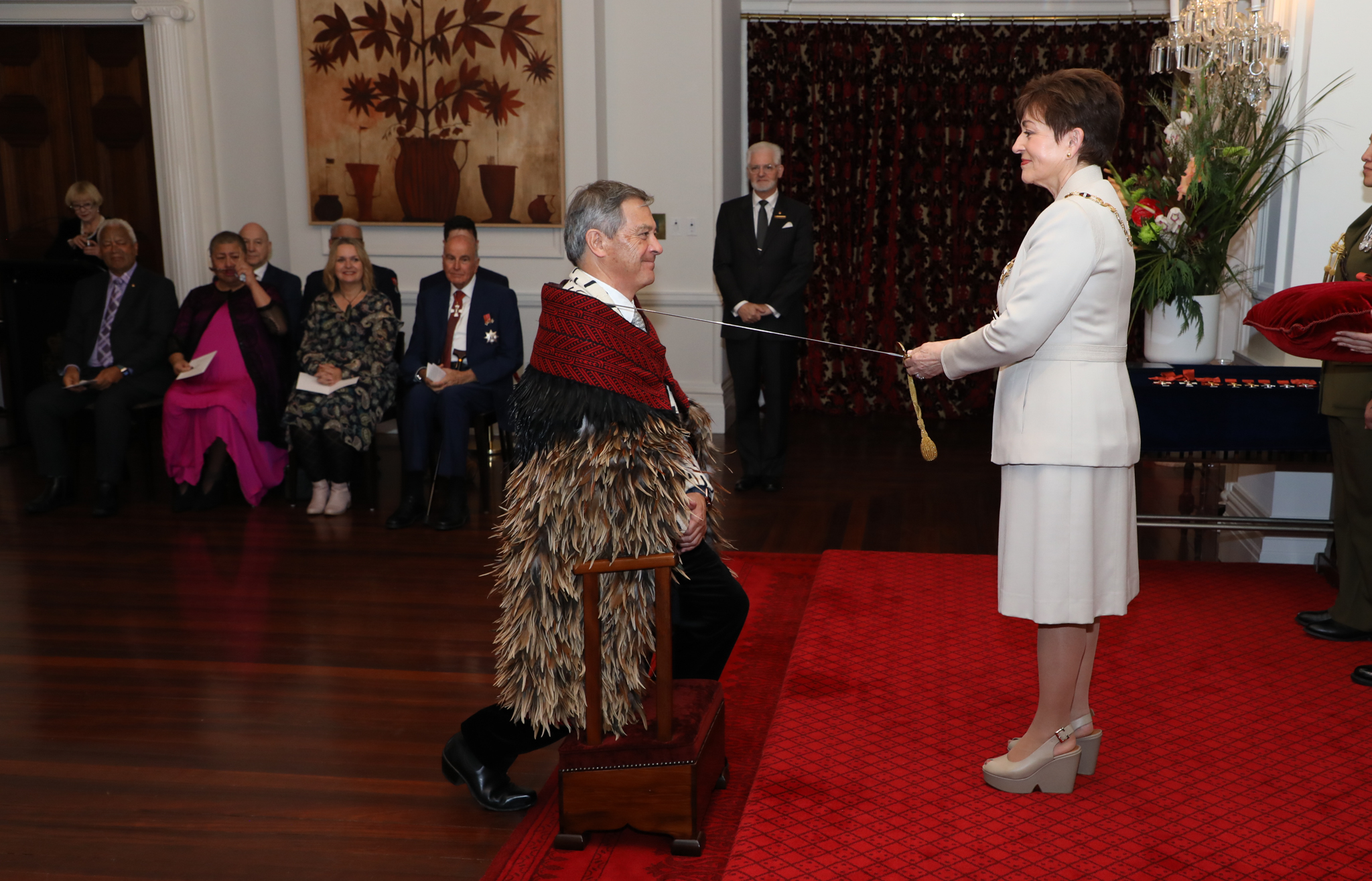
Taylor's investiture as a Knight Companion of the New Zealand Order of Merit by the governor-general, Dame Patsy Reddy, at Government House, Wellington, on 4 May 2021

In the 2021 New Year Honours, Taylor was promoted to Knight Companion of the New Zealand Order of Merit, for services to broadcasting, business and the community. He was awarded an honorary Doctor of Commerce (DCom) by his alma mater, the University of Otago, in May 2022. From March 2022, Sir Ian Taylor is serving as the Chair of the advisory board for New Zealand Product Accelerator(NZPA), a NZ government funded programme that helps connect industry with research expertise, to solve industry problems, increase productivity, and support economic growth.

== Views and positions ==
Between June 2023 and July 2025, Taylor published four open letters critiquing national policy: he warned that wealth-tax rhetoric could stigmatise job-creating founders; condemned the Government’s downsizing of the Dunedin Hospital project as shortsighted regional politics; defended small exporters after Prime Minister Christopher Luxon allegedly labelled them “C-listers”; and, while praising Jacinda Ardern’s early pandemic leadership, faulted the MIQ system and stalled reforms on child poverty and capital gains. Collectively the letters urged evidence-based decision-making, equitable regional investment and greater recognition of start-up innovators.

=== Salaries ===
In November 2012, Taylor spoke out against the high salaries being paid to New Zealand chief executives, saying chief executive salaries should be tied to how well they protect jobs and to the salaries of their staff.

=== Mining ===
Taylor has expressed opposition to the proposed Santana Minerals Bendigo-Ophir gold mine in Central Otago, expressing concern about its environmental impact and financial viability. In March 2026, Taylor challenged Resources Minister Shane Jones to a debate in regards to the proposed Bendigo-Ophir gold mine. Despite initially accepting, Jones pulled out of the debate less than two weeks before the scheduled date.

== Personal life ==
Taylor is married to Liz and they have two children. He is a nephew of the New Zealand singer Pixie Williams.
