= Betty's Bunch =

Television series

- Created by: Greg McGee; Dean Parker
- Directed by: Chris Bailey
- Starring: Maggie Kirkpatrick; Sarah Ford; Anthony Samuels; Jessica Cardiff-Smith; Clayton Spence; Paul Chubb; Ken Blackburn
- Composer: Dave McArtney
- Country of origin: New Zealand
- Original language: English
- No. of seasons: 1
- No. of episodes: 13

Production
- Executive producers: Don Reynolds; Ross Jennings; John McRae
- Producer: Wayne Tourell
- Cinematography: Matt Bowkett
- Editors: Dermot McNeillage; Christine Munro
- Running time: 30 minutes
- Production companies: South Pacific Pictures; Television New Zealand

Original release
- Network: Channel 2
- Release: 18 February – 13 May 1990

Betty's Bunch is a television drama/adventure series from New Zealand, produced in 1989. Aimed at a young audience, the story revolved around four foster kids living with Betty. Though things are not always easy financially for the family, they keep the spirit up. Things quickly become more difficult when they attract the attention of the two thieves Arthur and The Charmer. Soon afterwards, Betty is kidnapped and her foster children are forced to search for her, as well as avoid being separated by social services.

The series was repeated on New Zealand afternoon television in 1993 and screened in the UK on Channel Four.

The music and theme tune was performed by Dave McArtney of Hello Sailor.

== Cast and characters ==
=== Main ===
- Maggie Kirkpatrick as Betty
- Sarah Ford as Megan
- Anthony Samuels as Mick
- Jessica Cardiff-Smith as Chrissie
- Clayton Spence as Billy
- Paul Chubb as Arthur "the Con" Quinter
- Ken Blackburn as the Charmer

=== Guest ===
- Rena Owen as Shirley Gardner
- Ian Watkin as Sgt. Meadows
- Frank Whitten as Eagleton
- Tina Grenville as Amanda

== Episodes ==
No.	Title	Directed by	Written by	Original release date
1	"No Dough"	Chris Bailey	Dean Parker	18 February 1990
2	"Stalled"	Chris Bailey	Greg McGee	25 February 1990
3	"Stake Out"	Chris Bailey	Greg McGee	4 March 1990
4	"Uncle Chas"	Chris Bailey	Dean Parker	11 March 1990
5	"Billy Does a Runner"	Chris Bailey	Greg McGee	18 March 1990
6	"Gotcha"	Chris Bailey	Greg McGee	25 March 1990
7	"Ghosts"	Chris Bailey	Dean Parker	1 April 1990
8	"Happy Families"	Chris Bailey	Chris Hampson	8 April 1990
9	"The Incredible Journey"	Chris Bailey	Chris Hampson	14 April 1990
10	"The Weirdest Show on Earth"	Chris Bailey	Chris Hampson	22 April 1990
11	"To the Island"	Chris Bailey	Dean Parker	29 April 1990
12	"Down to the Centre of the Earth"	Chris Bailey	Dean Parker	6 May 1990
13	"The Lolly"	Chris Bailey	Dean Parker	13 May 1990
