= 2010 in New Zealand television =

This is a list of New Zealand television events and premieres that occurred in 2010, the 51st year of continuous operation of television in New Zealand.

== Premieres ==
=== Domestic series ===
Domestic television series premieres on New Zealand television in 2010
Program	Original airdate	Network	Ref
The Apprentice New Zealand	16 February	TV2	
The Filth Files	December	TV2	
The Jono Project	7 June	C4	
MasterChef New Zealand	3 February	TV One	
Radiradirah	21 May	TV3	
This is Not My Life	22 July	TV One	
Wanna-Ben	8 October	TV3	

=== International series ===
International television series premieres on New Zealand television in 2010
Program	Original airdate	Network	Country of origin	Ref
Waybuloo	January	TV2	United Kingdom, Canada	
The Middle	8 May	TV2	United States	
Kick Buttowski: Suburban Daredevil	18 October	TV2	United States	
Rush	2010	TV One	Australia	

=== Specials ===
Domestic television special premieres on New Zealand television in 2010
Program	Original airdate(s)	Network(s)	Ref
50 Years of New Zealand Television	13 June	Prime	
Eruption	13 October	TV3	

== Programming changes ==
=== Programmes ending in 2010 ===
Domestic programmes ending on New Zealand television in 2010
Programme	End date	Network	Start date	Ref
Outrageous Fortune^{[b]}	9 November	TV3	12 July 2005	
Studio 2 LIVE^{[b]}	1 October	TV2	22 March 2004	
