= Gruey =

1988 BBC children's programme

- Starring: Kieran O'Brien; Casey-Lee Jolleys
- Country of origin: United Kingdom
- No. of episodes: 12

Production
- Running time: 30 min.

Original release
- Network: BBC
- Release: 24 February 1988 – 9 February 1989

Gruey is a 1988 BBC TV children's comedy about the misadventures and escapades of Stephen 'Gruey' Grucock, a mischievous schoolboy played by Kieran O'Brien in the Jennings and Just William mould. In 1989 another series was produced and aired, titled Gruey Twoey. Gruey's best friend Annie Mappin was played by Casey-Lee Jolleys.
