= New Zealand's Funniest Home Videos =

New Zealand's Funniest Home Videos (also known as Minties New Zealand's Funniest Home Videos) is a New Zealand comedy clip show television program on TVNZ channel TV2, in which viewers were able to send in humorous homemade videotapes. The show officially began in 1990 and ended in 1993. The show's successor was called The Great Kiwi Video Show, which began in 1995 and ended in 1999.

== Synopsis ==
The show was mostly made up of clips taken from America's Funniest Home Videos with some New Zealand made clips added into the show. The New Zealand made clips were the only clips eligible to win the prizes. Every week, three videos were chosen by the producers and voted on by the studio audience. The weekly prize for the best video each week was a new Camcorder and the prize for the best video from the entire season won a package of home entertainment goods such as a new Television, VCR and Stereo. The prizes in the later seasons included a 14-inch (360 mm) TV for the weekly prize.

== History ==
The show debuted in September 1990 screening Saturday evenings on TV2 as a weekly half-hour primetime series. The shows original presenter was Ian Taylor. The first series ended in January 1991 and until mid-February a best of series was screened with Ian Taylor presenting from various holiday spots around New Zealand and the show screened clips seen in the first series. The second series screened from mid-February 1991 now presented by Kerry Smith. In 1993 presenter/comedian, Jason Gunn became the show's new host until the show ended that year. In 1995 the show was replaced by a similar show branded as The Great Kiwi Video Show and presented by Liane Clarke and, later, Fiona Anderson. The Great Kiwi Video Show ran until 1999.

== See also ==
- America's Funniest Home Videos
- Australia's Funniest Home Videos
