= Sticky TV =

- Directed by: Mary Phillips
- Presented by: Anna Hart; Paul Delamere
- Composer: Steve Robinson
- Country of origin: New Zealand
- Original language: English
- No. of series: 16

Production
- Producer: Mary Phillips
- Cinematography: Simon Ellis
- Production company: Pickled Possum Productions

Original release
- Network: TV3 (2002–11, 2016–17); FOUR (2011–16)
- Release: 8 April 2002 – 25 December 2017

Sticky TV is a New Zealand children's programme created by Pickled Possum Productions that was on New Zealand screens between 2002 and 2017. It aired on TV3 from 2002–11, before moving to FOUR, until July 2016 when it moved back to Three. Hosted by multiple personalities over the years, the presenters as of the end of the show (22 December 2017) were Walter Neilands and Leanna Cooper. Past presenters have made names for themselves on a national level with Drew Ne'emia, Kanoa Lloyd, Sam Wallace and Julia Wright being some of the most notable.

The show has gone through many transformations over the years but was originally filmed in a studio. The show was then filmed in a park, a separate studio, a rented house and then on a fictional farm, named the "Sticky Farm", before moving into a warehouse. With Four's shutdown on 3 July 2016, it moved back to Three from the following day, maintaining its existing afternoon slot.

Sticky TV was closed on 25 December 2017. The final episode aired at 7 am on Christmas Day 2017, and was a special containing a farewell tribute to the show.

== History ==
Pickled Possum Productions started gathering footage for the show in Queenstown on 19 March 2002 and was set to premiere on 8 April. Initially running at a 3:30pm timeslot, its inaugural presenters were Anna Hart and Paul Delamere, presenting wraparound segments in between shows such as Suzy's World and imported series Pokémon and Dragon Ball Z. Such segments included cooking, schooling tips including homework and Dairy Diary (using money).

A year into its run, The New Zealand Herald called it "cheap and cheerful" and praised its usage of children in the studio. With the start of the third season on 8 April 2004, Sticky TV moved away from the studio for the first time; the new presenters were Sam Wallace and Mary Phillips.

== Series overview ==
Series	Episodes		Originally released		
Series	Episodes		First released	Last released	Network
8	TBA		23 February 2009	December 2009	TV3
10	TBA		28 February 2011	24 December 2011	FOUR
11	TBA		13 February 2012	25 December 2012	FOUR
12	TBA		4 February 2013	25 December 2013	FOUR
13	TBA		2014	December 2014	FOUR
14	TBA		9 February 2015	25 December 2015	FOUR
15	TBA	TBA	8 February 2016	2 July 2016	FOUR
15	TBA	TBA	4 July 2016	25 December 2016	TV3
16	TBA		30 January 2017	25 December 2017	Three

== Presenters ==
Name	Year started	Year Ended
Anna Hart	2002	2003
Paul 'Sticky' Delamere	2002	2003
Sam Wallace	2004	2010
Julia Wright	2004	2007
Drew Neemia	2006	2009
Erin Simpson	2007	2008
Geoff Bell	2009	2010
Kanoa Lloyd	2009	2012
Walter Neilands	2010	2017
Monika Barton	2011	2012
Gerard Seth	2011	2014
Leanna Cooper	2013	2017
Jah Paki	2015	2017

== Segments ==
Sticky TV had numerous segments including teenage issues, cooking, fashion, and obstacle courses segments. In the show's final years, a Relaxation Station with a pond and chairs was added, where segments like WWYD? were held.

=== No Brain ===
No Brain was a competition that existed in the first season. If a contestant got all five questions right, the family would be taken to the studios in Auckland during filming on Saturdays to redeem the prize.

=== Wannabes ===
Wannabes was a talent competition, held from 6 May to 23 August 2002. Voting was done on a separate website (wannabes.tv) and by text messaging. In it, forty young singers ages 12 to 18 presented their music videos, cover versions of popular songs. The winner's prize was an overseas trip to visit a famous celebrity. The half-hour final was shown at 7:30pm on 23 August 2002.

Its third season in 2004 was hosted by Tom Hern.

=== Howzit ===
Howzit was a segment where viewers shared their problems. They received support from a panel of 11 and 12-year olds who were experiencing these issues. Introduced in 2004.

=== Freaky Feats ===
Freaky Feats was a competition held during season 3 in 2004 in which five contestants had to win five physical and mental challenges to win NZ$500. It ran before the last cartoon of the show.

=== Testers ===
Testers was a segment about testing different things at once. It started around 2015 and tests were done with Harlan and Star, who mostly discussed food and lifestyle. It lasted until the final episode on 25 December 2017.

=== What Would You Do? ===
What Would You Do was a segment of Sticky TV about teenage issues, including relationships, bullying, school, other life issues. Viewers can send in a question to be discussed on the show by a group of teenagers who have been selected to host the segment. Like Testers, it too lasted until the final episode.

=== Quiz Caravan ===
Quiz Caravan started in 2011 where players will answer 10 questions and win a prize. In 2014, it changed to having 7 questions and win 2 prizes. Once again, it ended with the final episode in 2017.

=== Fashion Camp ===
Fashion Camp first aired its one and only season in 2008, where two teams of three competed to win a prize by designing the best outfit. Themes chosen for the clothing throughout the series included Futuristic and Rockstar.

=== Survival Camp ===
Survival Camp first aired early in 2008 with two teams, one team of boys and one team of girls. In Survival Camp the teams take on challenges such as a High Ropes course, Raft and Bivouac building. It changed in 2009 (its second and final year) to having twenty teams of two.

=== Swaz or Swap ===
Swaz or Swap was a segment with 10 primary or intermediate students in a competition to get the chance to either get a prize (swaz), or take the money (swap).

Swaz or Swap works by getting a contestant to answer a question, if they answer incorrectly, they are out. If they choose correctly, they get to spin the 'Wheel of Swaz or Swap' which has a variety of cash prizes to win, as well as other prizes underneath the cash prize. The contestant can pick to either take the cash or the hidden prize underneath the cash prize. It is unknown when exactly this segment ended.

=== Cooking Camp ===
Cooking Camp was a segment on Sticky TV between 2009 and 2010. Cooking Camp is set up with two teams of three in a cook-off for presentation, taste and menu organisation by an AUT chef. In 2010, it changed to having the teams making meals for judges of 4 who are on blind dates.

=== Kick It ===
Kick It was a segment on Sticky TV in 2008. In Kick It, 4 people in teams of 2 are given clues as to where to go around Auckland, and find places and clues until the final leg where the winning team will be determined.

=== Sticky Stars Karaoke ===
Sticky Stars Karaoke was a segment from 2010 where people all over New Zealand would sing some karaoke, people would then vote for their favorites to go to the next round. The winner was Daniel Park( Taebz - an emerging artist hailing out of Auckland, New Zealand.)

=== Sticky Stars Duets ===
Sticky Stars Duets was the 2011 successor to Sticky Stars Karaoke. The setup was much as the same as the previous segment, with two performers per act instead of one.

=== The Mud Pit ===
The Mud Pit was a segment on Sticky TV in 2011. 20 contestants battle it out to become the last one standing. Their reward? Getting into the Mudpit with the chance of winning fantastic prizes.

=== Sticky Investigation ===
Sticky I was on air for one year (2008) where there was a small mystery in which two teams consisting of 2–3 people had to solve. They were able to look at a still scene of the crime in which the teams had to look for clues. The team that solved the crime first correctly was the winner.

=== Sticky Diner ===
Sticky Diner is a segment of Sticky TV that started airing after Cooking Camp was removed. It started off as 4–5 teams but was later changed to simply two teams. Sticky Diner started off similar to My Kitchen Rules as each team rated their meals to get an overall team score and then the presenter would also give them a score for the final score. With the change to only two teams, the judging process was altered so that the presenters and guest judges decide who wins. Like Swaz or Swap, it is unknown when the segment was removed.
