= Squirt (TV series) =

- Starring: Ryan Inglis; Jo Holley; Spike T. Penguin
- Country of origin: New Zealand

Production
- Camera setup: Single
- Running time: 30 minutes (plus commercials)

Original release
- Network: TV3 (1996–1997); TV2 (1997–2006)
- Release: 1 March 1996 – 26 November 2006

Squirt is a New Zealand children's television show, produced in Dunedin. It began airing in 1996 on TV3 and moved to TV 2 in 1997, before coming to a close on 21 November 2006. Squirt was aired every Saturday morning, originally from 7 am to 9 am, then from 8:30 am to 10 am, eventually running from 8:30 am to 9 am for only 30 minutes. In the original time, cartoons were aired, such as Cow & Chicken, Batman of the Future and Earthworm Jim. There were also weekly competitions, and many informational segments such as "Out There!" and "Astounding Squirt Facts".

It was notable for Dunedin-based production company TaylorMade, and Animation Research Limited's (ARL) pioneering use of "live" motion capture, used in the 3D animation of the digital co-host Spike The Penguin. A performer was off camera in a special costume, making all the moves and vocal responses to the main host's comments, which played back in real time on a monitor for the crew, while all the motion was digitally recorded, which could then be applied to a fully rendered Spike, and composited into shot in post-production, ready for broadcast.

== Presenters ==
- Ryan Inglis
- Jo Holley
- Spike The Penguin (3D computer graphics penguin voiced and performed by Katie Brockie)
- Matthew Gibb
- Dominic Bowden
- Thomas Robins
- Chris Dykzeul
- Beau Jeffries
- Jason Gunn
- Gordon (animated fish)
- Hamish (animated fish; voiced by Simon McKinney)
- Newt (animated fish)

== Programmes ==
- Ace Ventura: Pet Detective
- The Adventures of Sam & Max: Freelance Police
- The Angry Beavers
- Animorphs
- Bad Dog
- Batman of the Future
- Batman: The Animated Series
- Big Guy and Rusty the Boy Robot
- Big Wolf on Campus
- Bobby's World
- Brand Spanking New! Doug
- Bruno the Kid
- Bump in the Night
- Cow & Chicken
- Cubix
- Digimon
- Earthworm Jim
- Ed, Edd n Eddy
- Eekstravaganza
- Freakazoid
- Godzilla: The Series
- Goosebumps
- Jackie Chan Adventures
- Johnny Bravo
- Jumanji
- KaBlam!
- Mad Jack the Pirate
- Max Steel
- Men in Black: The Series
- Ninja Turtles: The Next Mutation
- Oscar and Friends
- Pee-wee's Playhouse
- Pinky and the Brain
- Problem Child
- Rocket Power
- Roughnecks: Starship Troopers Chronicles
- Rugrats
- The Secret Files of the Spy Dogs
- Silver Surfer
- Spider-Man
- Spider-Man Unlimited
- SpongeBob SquarePants
- Steven Spielberg Presents Toonsylvania
- Street Sharks
- Taz-Mania
- What's New, Scooby-Doo?
- Xyber 9
- X-Men
- X-Men: Evolution
- The Zeta Project
