= 60 Minutes (New Zealand TV programme) =

- Genre: News magazine
- Based on: 60 Minutes by Don Hewitt
- Presented by: Alistair Wilkinson; Mike McRoberts
- Country of origin: New Zealand
- Original language: English

Production
- Executive producer: Terence Taylor
- Producers: Chris Wilks; Eugene Bingham
- Editors: Paul Enticott; Toby Longbottom
- Camera setup: George Murahidy; Arthur Rasmussen
- Running time: 60 minutes, including adverts.

Original release
- Network: TV3
- Release: 1990 – 1992
- Network: TVNZ
- Release: 24 January 1993 – September 2001
- Network: TV3
- Release: 2002 – 2012
- Network: Sky Open
- Release: 11 February 2013 – present

60 Minutes is a New Zealand news magazine television show. It was originally broadcast on TV3. The show began in New Zealand in 1989 based on the American programme by the same name.

The broadcaster of 60 Minutes changed twice during the 1990s. It was one of TV3's flagship programmes when TV3 went to air on 3 December 1989, then in 1992 TVNZ won the rights to the programme. After being shown on TV1 from 1993 to 2002, TVNZ decided not to renew the rights the show from CBS, and the rights were reacquired by TV3. Following this, there was a fight over the www.60minutes.co.nz domain, which for a short time, redirected to the site on TVNZ's replacement Sunday. Currently, the domain redirects to the www.cbs.com website. From 2013, the programme was broadcast on Sky Open (formerly known as Prime TV).

During 2015 Charlotte Bellis hosted the show, till December 2015 when the show went through a restructure to a format with a New Zealand presenter introducing international stories from other editions of 60 Minutes around the world.

60 Minutes returned for 2016 on Monday 11 April with the current affairs from around the world presented by Alistair Wilkinson.

== Awards ==
In the inaugural Qantas Television Awards in 2005, the show won

- Best Current Affairs Series
- Best Current Affairs Reporter for Amanda Millar
- Best Current Affairs Senior Camera for Ross Kenward on a segment called "Green Acres"

At the 2008 Qantas Film and Television Awards, the show won

- Best Current Affairs Reporting for a weekly programme or one off current affairs special – Sarah Hall, Paula Penfold, George Murahidy and Catherine Hallinan.
- Best Current Affairs Camera – George Murahidy
- Best News and Current Affairs Editing – Paul Enticott

== Controversy ==
Some segments broadcast have received negative responses. After an item entitled "Fowl Play" aired on 20 September 2004 about battery farming of hens, the Egg Producers Federation of New Zealand (EPFNZ) complained to the Broadcasting Standards Authority. They claimed it was unbalanced, inaccurate and unfair, but the Authority did not uphold the complaint as the EPFNZ had failed to participate in the item.

In July 2005, an interview with Ashraf Choudhary, the only Muslim Member of Parliament in New Zealand was broadcast. In this Choudhary stated that he would not condemn the practise of stoning to death some homosexuals and people who have extramarital affairs.

A story broadcast in 2005 on the South Pacific received criticism from the Vanuatu Tourism Office General Manager. He said that the story by Rick Williamson was disrespectful to South Pacific cultures, taking footage out of context. In one section chiefs and villagers drinking kava are described as "really hammered" and "plastered on this stuff", while Williamson says when he partook in the kava that it was a "portal to the spirit world".

=== Broadcasting standards breaches ===
In August 1997, New Zealand's Broadcasting Standards Authority (BSA) upheld complaints that a 60 Minutes item on rape allegations against rugby player Roger Randle was unfair and lacked balance. The majority found the programme sought to vindicate Randle by portraying the complainant as of "dubious morality" and implying that, if raped, she had "asked for it"; no order was imposed.

In March 2010, the BSA upheld a complaint by the Hastings District Council against 60 Minutes for breaching privacy and fairness standards in a 2009 broadcast about girl gangs in Hawke's Bay. The segment showed four underage girls—some as young as 12—engaging in antisocial behaviour, including graffiti and a staged house break-in, while failing to adequately conceal their identities. The BSA found that the broadcaster did not have informed consent, exploited the children, and disclosed highly offensive private facts. While other complaints on accuracy and law and order were not upheld, the Authority ruled that the broadcast unjustifiably breached the girls' privacy and failed to treat them fairly. TVWorks was ordered to air a summary of the decision, pay $3,560.12 to the complainant, and $2,500 in costs to the Crown.
