= Subscription television in New Zealand =

Subscription television was introduced in New Zealand in May 1990 as a UHF service provided by Sky Network Television. A digital satellite service started in 1998. Jack Matthews, a US expatriate, set up Saturn Cable in the 90s.

On 31 August 2009, Sky began shutting down its UHF service. A digital terrestrial counterpart, Igloo, existed between 2012 and 2017.

== Delivery ==
=== Satellite ===
- Sky uses the Optus D1 satellite.

=== IPTV ===
- Vodafone: currently operates a Broadband TV service delivered over fibre, available in Auckland, Wellington and Christchurch, Whangarei, Palmerston North and Dunedin.
