= Melania (film) =

2026 film by Brett Ratner

- Theatrical release poster
- Directed by: Brett Ratner
- Produced by: Brett Ratner; Fernando Sulichin; Marc Beckman; Melania Trump
- Starring: Melania Trump
- Cinematography: Barry Peterson; Dante Spinotti; Jeff Cronenweth
- Edited by: Alex Márquez
- Music by: Tony Neiman
- Production companies: Muse Films; New Element Media; RatPac Entertainment
- Distributed by: Amazon MGM Studios
- Release date: January 30, 2026 (United States)
- Running time: 104 minutes
- Country: United States
- Language: English
- Budget: $40 million
- Box office: $16.7 million

Melania is a 2026 American film directed and produced by Brett Ratner. It follows Melania Trump, the first lady of the United States, in the 20 days before her husband Donald's second presidential inauguration. It was released in the United States by Amazon MGM Studios on January 30, 2026.

Development started shortly after the 2024 presidential election and the project received bids from Amazon, Disney, Netflix, and Paramount Pictures. Amazon's offer of $40 million, the highest price ever paid for a commissioned documentary, also included a theatrical release and a follow-up to be filmed in a proposed docuseries format. Melania retained editorial control, heavily involving herself in the production, and stated that it was not a documentary.

Melania received overwhelmingly negative reviews from critics, who criticized its self-promotional or propagandistic nature. Its high production and marketing costs, paid by Amazon, fostered discussion about the motivations behind its financing and distribution. It was a box-office bomb, grossing $16.7 million on a $40 million production budget.

== Synopsis ==
Melania covers the personal experiences of Melania Trump in the 20 days before the second inauguration of Donald Trump on January 20, 2025. It begins with a voiceover by Melania, who says the purpose of the film is "to show the American people my life" and her "journey from private citizen to first lady". After a meeting with her fashion designer Hervé Pierre at Trump Tower and a discussion with an interior decorator about plans for the Trump family's move into the White House, Melania attends the state funeral of Jimmy Carter in Washington on January 9. Afterwards, she heads back to New York to light a candle for her deceased mother, Amalija Knavs, in St. Patrick's Cathedral.

Melania has a video call with French first lady Brigitte Macron, followed by her meeting with Queen Rania of Jordan. Melania then holds a meeting with Aviva Siegel, a former Gaza war hostage advocating for the release of her husband Keith. Melania makes a brief retreat to the Trump family residence at Mar-a-Lago, where she discusses the planning for the inauguration with her husband. The day before the inauguration, Melania has dinner with her family and Trump 2024 campaign donors. The film depicts the day of the inauguration from Melania's perspective and ends with a voiceover by the newly inaugurated First Lady. A lengthy pre-credits sequence lists her touted accomplishments in this role.

== Production ==
=== Development ===
The idea of a documentary about Melania Trump, the wife of Donald Trump, was either pitched by her to Jeff Bezos during a dinner at Mar-a-Lago in 2024, or she pitched it to Marc Beckman, her senior adviser and manager, after the 2024 presidential election. She signed on as an executive producer for a documentary about her days after the election. Melania said her impetus was a warm reception to her 2024 memoir. Melania stated that it was not a documentary, but instead "a created experience" and "purposeful storytelling".

=== Financing ===
Amazon, Disney, Netflix, and Paramount Pictures bid for the streaming rights. Disney offered around $14 million, but lost to Amazon's bid of $40 million to license it and produce a follow-up docuseries on her. This was the highest price ever paid for a documentary. Ted Hope, who launched Amazon's film division and led it until 2020, stated that it was probably the most expensive documentary without music licensing. Melania said that she accepted Amazon's offer due to the inclusion of a theatrical release.

The Wall Street Journal reported that Melania earned $28 million from Melania while Donald's certified annual financial disclosure report stated that she earned $10.71 million. Hope questioned how the high price for the documentary could not be seen as a bribe. The TV host Jimmy Kimmel criticized the production as a $75 million bribe. Don Fox, who was acting director of the United States Office of Government Ethics, stated that the documentary seemed like it was meant to curry favor.

=== Filming ===
In January 2025, Amazon MGM Studios announced that Brett Ratner would direct a documentary about Trump. Fernando Sulichin was brought on as an executive producer. Melania is Ratner's first film since numerous women accused him of sexual misconduct in 2017. Ratner was the only person considered for the job. Numerous criticisms were made of Ratner's behavior on set, with cast members describing his behavior as "slimy".

Filming began in December 2024, and months of filming was done in Mar-a-Lago. Melania held editorial control over Melania and was involved in the trailer, color correction, music selection, advertising campaign, and designed the logo. Cinematographers Barry Peterson, Jeff Cronenweth, and Dante Spinotti were part of the filming crew. Spinotti agreed to do the cinematography due to his prior work with Ratner on Red Dragon (2002) and X-Men: The Last Stand (2006) and his curiosity about the Trump administration.

Some scenes involved up to 80 crew members and there were 12 crews in Washington, D.C. during the inauguration. Amazon employees were told they could not opt out of working on Melania "for political reasons". Two-thirds of the New York production crew staff asked to be omitted from the credits.

== Soundtrack ==
An original score was composed by Tony Neiman, including the song "Melania's Waltz". Licensed music by Johann Sebastian Bach, Wolfgang Amadeus Mozart, Ennio Morricone, Aretha Franklin, Boney M., the Crystals, Elvis Presley, Giorgio Moroder, James Brown, Jonny Greenwood, Michael Jackson, the Rolling Stones, Sylvie Vartan, Tears for Fears, Village People, and Spandau Ballet was used.

Greenwood and Paul Thomas Anderson criticized the use of music from Anderson's film Phantom Thread and requested its removal. They stated that Universal Pictures violated its agreement with Greenwood as it did not consult him for third-party use. Producer Marc Beckman disputed this, saying they had acquired the legal rights. In an interview, Beckman said that Guns N' Roses, Grace Jones, and the estate of Prince rejected requests to use their music.

== Marketing ==
A trailer for Melania was released on December 17, 2025. Ellen von Unwerth shot the poster photograph. On January 28, Melania rang the opening bell at the New York Stock Exchange before she made brief remarks to promote it. Donald Trump advertised Melania on Truth Social in anticipation of its release.

The marketing budget was reported to be $35 million, far higher than marketing for many other big-budget documentaries, but the production has denied this figure. RBG (2018), for example, had a marketing budget of $3 million. From December 22, 2025 to January 23, 2026, Amazon spent $3.5 million on national linear TV ads. Over 461 million household impressions were estimated from network marketing, with the four highest reaching programs on Fox News. Promotions also included an event at the Sphere, in Las Vegas.

Melania was advertised on billboards and bus stops across Los Angeles, which were defaced by Indecline and others. The Los Angeles Metro re-routed buses with Melania ads to avoid vandalism.

== Release ==
Melania Trump presenting a screening of the film

Melania premiered at the Kennedy Center on January 29, 2026, with other screenings for friends and supporters were held across 20 cities held on the same day. Amazon MGM Studios released it on January 30, in 2,000 theatres domestically and 5,000 worldwide. A theatrical release was required as part of Amazon MGM Studios' purchase of distribution rights. Melania was expected to be available for streaming three to four weeks after its theatrical debut. Amazon did not grant tickets to members of the mainstream press to attend advance screenings of the documentary prior to its public release. Melania began streaming on Amazon Prime Video on March 9, 2026.

FilmNation Entertainment will distribute Melania in over 20 countries. Filmfinity cancelled the South African release on January 28. It will be released in over 100 cinemas in the United Kingdom. An exclusive screening of Melania in Belgium on February 15 was attended by the US ambassador to Belgium Bill White and Melania Trump's personal photographer Régine Mahaux.

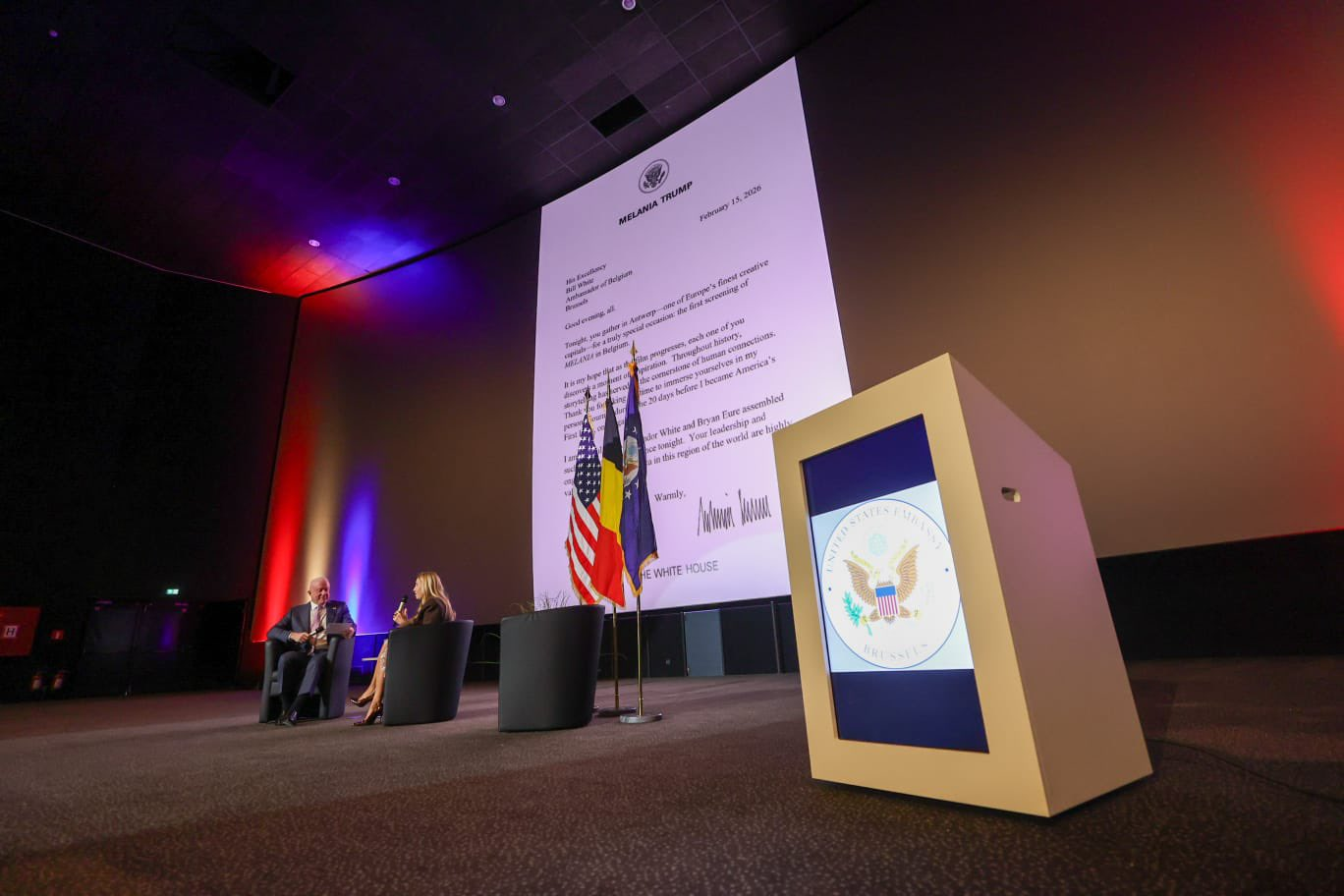
White and Mahaux at the screening of Melania in Belgium

Prior to the premiere, a screening and dinner was held at the White House with 70 guests in attendance, including Queen Rania of Jordan, Tim Cook, Mike Hopkins, Andy Jassy, Lynn Martin, Tony Robbins, Lisa Su, Mike Tyson, and Eric Yuan. A makeshift theater was used as the usual screening room had been demolished by Donald Trump along with the rest of the East Wing the previous year. A military band played "Melania's Waltz", composed by Tony Neiman, as guests were greeted.

A campaign to watch Michelle Obama's 2020 documentary Becoming in protest of Melania led to Becoming's viewership rising by 13,000%. In protest of Melania, thousands of Amazon users purchased the erotic novel Melania: Devourer of Men, making it the top Amazon search result for 'Melania Trump.'

== Reception ==
=== Box office ===
Melania grossed $16.4 million in the United States and Canada, and $303,986 in other territories, for a worldwide total of $16.7 million. In the United States and Canada, Melania was released alongside Send Help, Shelter, and Iron Lung, and was projected to gross around $5 million from 1,500 theaters. It made $2.9 million on its first day and earned $7 million in its opening weekend, finishing in third place. It had the highest opening for a non-concert documentary since the $10.7 million opening for Chimpanzee (2012). Of its opening day audience, 49% identified as Republicans, 47% identified as politically conservative, while 2% identified as Democrats, and 74% were Caucasian, 11% Hispanic, 4% Black, 4% Asian American, and 7% Native American or other. The audience was 72% female and 83% were over the age of 45.

In the days leading up to its release, the largest AMC Theatre in Boston reported that only one ticket was sold over three showtimes. A review of 1,398 showings on Fandango Media across 329 American theaters by Wired showed that only two screenings were sold out before the premiere.

Melania opened in 29th place at the British box office with £32,974, an average of £212.80 across 155 cinemas, but its earnings fell by 88% in its second weekend to £4,091, an average of £65.98 across 62 cinemas. There was a sold-out screening in Melania's native Slovenia. Among the 27 showings in eight theaters in Mexico City, 15 of those had not sold any tickets, with an estimated 2.9 moviegoers per showing. Theater chain Hoyts pre-sold fewer than 50 tickets for opening day screenings in Australia and it grossed AUD$32,399 from 33 theaters over its opening weekend, ranking 31st at the box office.

=== Critical response ===
On the review aggregator website Rotten Tomatoes, 9% of 64 critics' reviews are positive, with an average rating of 2.8/10. The website's consensus reads: "Presented with great pomp and circumstance but little insight, this documentary purports to be an up-close view of the First Lady while curiously revealing very little about her." Metacritic, which uses a weighted average, assigned Melania a score of 5 out of 100, based on 18 critics, indicating "overwhelming dislike".

In Owen Gleiberman's review for Variety, he called Melania a "shameless infomercial" and compared it to 1960s propaganda in China. Nick Hilton, writing for The Independent, compared Melania to The Birth of a Nation (1915) and Triumph of the Will (1935) and criticized Melania as vapid and lacking information about Melania. Joy Press wrote in her review for Vanity Fair that Ratner was an inferior propagandist to Leni Riefenstahl. William Thomas, writing for Empire, called Melania scripted reality and political propaganda.

Xan Brooks, writing for The Guardian, criticized the slow pace and listless nature and considered Melania a "gilded trash remake" of The Zone of Interest (2023). The lack of content and action was criticized by Sophie Gilbert in The Atlantic. Donald Clarke said it "induced narcolepsy" in The Irish Times. Kevin Fallon, writing for The Daily Beast, criticized the lack of drama, overdramatic direction, and odd music cues.

Brian Truitt, writing for USA Today, criticized the emotional disconnect, highlighting Melania's lack of personality, the fact that she never addresses the camera directly, and scenes in which she is unbothered while watching wildfires in California. William Bibbiani, writing for TheWrap, was critical of the lack of humanity shown as Melania focuses on her dead mother while footage of Jimmy Carter's funeral plays.

Frank Scheck noted in The Hollywood Reporter that the musical choices included songs about murder, rape, and war ("Gimme Shelter"); false sexual allegations ("Billie Jean"); sex ("Boléro"); power and ambition ("Everybody Wants to Rule the World"); and male domination ("It's a Man's Man's Man's World"). Lauren Collins of The New Yorker argued that the use of a performance of "Amazing Grace" by Aretha Franklin felt "vaguely trolling" due to its association with the civil rights movement and Barack Obama.

Armond White, writing for National Review, praised Ratner's direction and criticized negative reviews from other critics.

=== Audience reception ===
Melania was review bombed on Letterboxd prior to its release. All of the reviews were removed, which Letterboxd attributed to correcting an incorrect release date pulled from another movie database. Review bombing and reverse review bombing has been conducted on the audience scores for review sites. Rolling Stone reported that Melania received over 44,000 ratings on IMDB, with 87% giving it one out of ten; only 4% rated it ten out of ten.

Audiences polled by CinemaScore gave Melania an average grade of "A" on an A+ to F scale, while those surveyed by PostTrak gave it an average five out of five, with 89% saying they would definitely recommend it. The Guardian asserted that the disparity in ratings between professional critics and the public may be "the biggest gap between critical and popular scores" for any film in history. Melania set a record on Rotten Tomatoes for the largest disparity between critics' scores and audience ratings in the platform's history.

=== Industry response ===
The documentary filmmaker Kyle Henry said that Melania was not a documentary and instead campaign advertising and a bribe. Julie Cohen, who co-directed RBG and My Name Is Pauli Murray (2021), said it had "no artistic or journalistic integrity" due to Melania's editorial control and questioned the price Amazon paid.
