= 2014 in New Zealand television =

This is a list of New Zealand television events and premieres that occurred in 2014, the 55th year of continuous operation of television in New Zealand.

== Events ==
- 13 January – TVNZ serial drama Shortland Street returns from its summer break, revealing the characters who died in the 2013 season finale.
- 14 January – It is announced that Trackside, the New Zealand horse racing channel, will no longer be aired on Freeview and will become a pay-per-view channel.
- 16 January – TVNZ reveal they will be airing the 2014 Grammy Awards on their free-to-air channels direct from the United States. A first for New Zealand free-to-air networks
- 3 February – Former TV3 reporter, Rachel Smalley, joins TVNZ current affairs show, Q+A
- 5 February – Sky Network Television announce they will no longer resell their services through Telecom.
- 8 February – After winning the broadcasting rights in 2013, Prime Television begins coverage of the 2014 Winter Olympics.
- 17 February – Television New Zealand unit manager, Shane Taurima resigns after it is revealed he took part in political conferences and allowed the opposition party (Labour) to use TVNZ facilities.
- 17 February – After a year on hiatus, the controversial reality show, The GC returns for a second season and begins airing on TV3 and funded by Te Mangai Paho.
- 19 February – Robert Rakete joins the Australian children's act, The Wiggles as the Brown Wiggle.
- 19 February – New Zealand actor, Charles Mesure joins the cast as Blackbeard in US television drama, Once Upon a Time alongside fellow New Zealander, Rose McIver (who plays Tinker Bell).
- 24 February – With the old UHF/VHF system being turned off in New Zealand in December 2013, Sky Television's profits increase by 22%
- 28 February – TVNZ reporter, Lisa Owen defects to TV3 to cohost The Nation.
- 9 March – MasterChef New Zealand contestants, Glynn and James, receive complaints regarding posts made on their Facebook page, however TVNZ releases a statement saying they have no control over Facebook or Twitter accounts made by contestants.
- 11 March – A Trademe.co.nz advert receives a complaint regarding the use and misinterpretation of the surname, "Ramsbottom" minutes are going live.
- 13 March – Actress Rose McIver is cast in upcoming US television based on a comic book series, iZombie
- 13 March – New Zealand On Air confirms that they will help fund a two part telemovie for cancelled television show, Nothing Trivial to give closure to the fans.
- 16 March – TV3 confirms that the next series of The Block NZ will be set on Newell Street in Auckland suburb, Point Chevalier
- 17 March – Chefs Ben Bayly and Gareth Stewart are confirmed as being the judges for new reality show, My Kitchen Rules NZ
- 17 March – In a controversial move, the Board for Māori Television push for former TVNZ Māori and Pacific unit general manager, Paora Maxwell to become CEO of the network.
- 17 March – Seven Sharp co-anchorman, Jesse Mulligan is confirmed as the new host for comedic television show, Best Bits, replacing comedian, Te Radar
- 21 March – Comedian Rhys Darby's mockumentary show, Short Poppies is confirmed to debut on Netflix in April 2014
- 22 March – English comedian Tony Robinson announces he will release a television series showing New Zealand war stories
- 23 March – After announcing when series three of The Block NZ will be based, residents of Point Chevalier's Newell Street unite to stop the shows production
- 24 March – Sommet Sports announcing they will be providing a satellite service on Freeview and Sky Television effective 14 April.
- 14 April – Sommet Sports begins airing on Sky Television
- 28 March – New Zealand television blogger, Chris Philpott retires from blogging after the birth of his first child.
- 30 March – Residents of the Auckland suburb, Point Chevalier, discover the houses in the next series of The Block NZ will be multistoried, much to their dismay.
- 1 April – Rhys Darby's parody television series, Short Poppies, becomes available in New Zealand on TVNZ On Demand.
- 1 April – Actor Temuera Morrison receives a $1.1 million grant from New Zealand on Air to fund a variety show.
- 26 April – TV Rotorua and Info Rotorua announcing they will be providing a satellite service on Freeview and Sky Television effective 26 April.
- 28 August - Spark New Zealand launches its Lightbox streaming service.
- TBA – Prime also holds the rights to broadcast the 2014 Commonwealth Games in New Zealand.

== Premieres ==
=== Domestic series ===
Domestic television series premieres on New Zealand television in 2014
Program	Original airdate	Network	Ref
The Paul Henry Show	27 January	TV3	
The Great Food Race	3 February	TV3	
Step Dave	11 February	TV2	
Nabbed	11 February	TV2	
Cadbury Dream Factory	20 February	TV3	
The 4.30 Show	24 February	TV2	
The Art of The Architect	20 March	TV One	
Women in Blue	22 April	TV One	
Cold Science	TBA	TV One	
Coverband	TBA	TV One	
Grand Designs NZ	TBA	TV3	
Hope & Wire	3 July	TV3	
Inconceivable	TBA	TV One	
Short Poppies	TBA	TV One	
Who Am I?	TBA	TV3	

=== International series ===
International television series premieres on New Zealand television in 2014
Program	Original airdate	Network	Country of origin	Ref
Crime Secrets Of...	7 January	TV One	United Kingdom	
The Goldbergs	13 January	Four	United States	
Super Fun Night	13 January	TV2	United States	
Trophy Wife	13 January	TV2	United States	
Kangaroo Dundee	21 February	TV One	Australia	
Hannibal	25 January	TV3	United States	
Hotel GB	25 January	TV3	United Kingdom	
The Doctor Blake Mysteries	25 January	TV One	Australia	
The Michael J. Fox Show	27 January	Four	United States	
Betrayal	2 February	TV One	United States	
Weight Loss Ward	4 February	TV2	United Kingdom	
Rake	5 February	TV One	Australia	
Friends with Benefits	8 February	Four	United States	
The Paradise	8 February	Prime	United Kingdom	
The Blacklist	9 February	TV3	United States	
Mom	12 February	TV2	United States	
The Originals	13 February	TV2	United States	
Agents of S.H.I.E.L.D.	16 February	TV2	United States	
Space Racers	16 February	TVNZ Kidzone	United States	
The Tomorrow People	16 February	TV2	United States	
Richard Hammond: The Miracles of Nature	19 February	TV3	United Kingdom	
House of Lies	20 February	Four	United States	
House of Cards	23 February	TV3	United States	
Gordon Ramsay's Home Cooking	1 March	TV3	United Kingdom	
The Block: Sky High	10 March	TV3	Australia	
Troy	12 March	TV3	United Kingdom	
72 Hours	TBA	TV2	United States	
Almost Human	TBA	TV2	United States	
ANZAC Girls	9 December	Prime	Australia	
Bad Teacher	TBA	Four	United States	
Believe	TBA	TV2	United States	
Breathless	TBA	TV One	United Kingdom	
Broadchurch	11 May	TV One	United Kingdom	
The Great Australian Bake-Off	TBA	Prime	Australia	
Ground Floor	1 September	TV2	United States	
The Hero	TBA	TV2	United States	
Intelligence	19 May	TV One	United States	
Jamie's Money Saving Meals	TBA	TV3	United Kingdom	
Kevin's Beach Hut	TBA	TV3	United Kingdom	
Mixology	3 November	TV2	United States	
Once Upon a Time in Wonderland	TBA	TV2	United States	
Rake	TBA	TV3	United States	
Resurrection	16 July	TV2	United States	
Secrets & Lies	2 November	TV One	Australia	
Slide Show	TBA	TV3	Australia	
Star-Crossed	TBA	Prime	United States	
Undateable	TBA	TV2	United States	
Upper Middle Bogan	14 August	TV One	Australia	
Welcome to the Family	TBA	Four	United States	
The White Queen	18 June	Prime	United Kingdom	
Peg + Cat	TBA	TVNZ Kidzone	United States, Canada	
Wander Over Yonder	TBA	TV2	United States	
The Doozers	TBA	TVNZ Kidzone	United States, Canada	
Lily's Driftwood Bay	TBA	TVNZ Kidzone	Northern Ireland	
PAW Patrol	TBA	TV2	United States, Canada	
The Tom and Jerry Show (2014)	TBA	TV2	United States	

*Due to low ratings, TV3 moved Hotel GB from its primetime slot to airing at 9.30am on Saturdays effective 22 February.

=== Telemovies and miniseries ===
Domestic television telemovie and miniseries premieres on New Zealand television in 2014
Program	Original airdate	Network	Ref
Field Punishment No. 1	22 April	TV One	
Abandoned	TBA	TV One	
How To Murder Your Wife	TBA	TV One	
The Kick	10 August	TV One	
Pirates of the Airwaves	TBA	TV One	
Project L	TBA	TV One	
Nancy Wake's Story	TBA	TV One	
The Brokenwood Mysteries	28 September	Prime	
When We Go To War	TBA	TV One	

=== Documentaries ===
Domestic television documentary premieres on New Zealand television in 2014
Program	Original airdate(s)	Network	Ref
Back from the Death Zone	TBA	Prime	
The Day That Changed My Life	TBA	TV One	
Diamond in the Rough	TBA	TV One	
Keeping It Pure	TBA	Prime	
The Naughty Bits	TBA	Prime	
Operation Overdue	TBA	TV One	

=== Specials ===
Domestic television special premieres on New Zealand television in 2014
Program	Original airdate(s)	Network(s)	Ref
Kiwi Blacks in the Winter White: Attitude Special	TBA	TV One	

== Programming changes ==
=== Programmes changing networks ===
Criterion for inclusion in the following list is that New Zealand premiere episodes will air in New Zealand for the first time on the new network. This includes when a program is moved from a free-to-air network's primary channel to a digital multi-channel, as well as when a program moves between subscription television channels – provided the preceding criterion is met. Ended television series which change networks for repeat broadcasts are not included in the list.

Domestic television series which changed network affiliation in 2014
Programme	Date	New network	Previous network	Ref
The ITM Fishing Show	30 April	TV One	TV3	

International television programmes which changed channel/network in 2014
Programme	Date	New network	Previous network	Country of origin	Ref
Bones	21 January	Prime	TV3	United States	
How I Met Your Mother	21 February	TV3	Four	United States	
Live at the Apollo	30 May	TV3	TV2	United Kingdom	
Modern Family	9 January	Prime	TV3	United States	
The Mentalist	29 July	TV One	TV2	United States	
The Michael J. Fox Show°	27 January	Four	TV3	United States	
Scandal	15 January	TV2	TV One	United States	

°Originally, The Michael J. Fox Show was shown as part of TV3's new line-up. However, it has since been dropped by TV3 and was picked up and has begun airing on sister network, Four.

=== Free-to-air premieres ===
This is a list of programmes which made their premiere on New Zealand free-to-air television that had previously premiered on New Zealand subscription television. Programs may still air on the original subscription television network.

Programme	Date	Free-to-air network	Subscription network(s)	Country of origin	Ref
New Zealand with Nadia Lim	22 November	TV One	Food Television	New Zealand	

=== Subscription premieres ===
This is a list of programmes which made their premiere on New Zealand subscription television that had previously premiered on New Zealand free-to-air television. Programmes may still air on the original free-to-air television network.

International television series that premiered on New Zealand free-to-air television in 2014
Programme	Date	Free-to-air network	Subscription network(s)	Country of origin	Ref

=== Programmes returning in 2014 ===
Returning programmes on New Zealand television in 2014
Programme	Return date	Network	Original run	Ref

=== Milestone episodes in 2014 ===
Domestic television series which have reached a milestone in 2014
Show	Network	Episode #	Episode title	Episode air date	Source

=== Programmes ending in 2014 ===
Domestic programmes ending on New Zealand television in 2014
Programme	End date	Network	Start date	Ref

== Deaths ==
Date	Name	Age	Notability	Source
22 February	Charlotte Dawson	47	Television host in both New Zealand and Australia	
25 August	George Burck	75	News reporter	
