= CNN Films =

Film production company

- Type: Division
- Industry: Motion picture Film distribution
- Founded: 2012; 14 years ago
- Headquarters: United States
- Products: Films
- Owner: Skydance Corporation
- Parent: CNN Worldwide
- Website: cnn.com/cnnfilms

Cable News Network Films (known as CNN Films) is a motion picture division of CNN Worldwide, originally launched in 2012. Its first film, Girl Rising premiered in spring 2013 in the United States.

== History ==
On October 8, 2012, CNN announced the creation of CNN Films. CNN says that it will acquire and commission original feature-length documentaries that will "examine an array of political, social, and economic subject matters." It also signed development deals with documentary directors Alex Gibney and Andrew Rossi. Since its creation, it already acquired the rights for Girl Rising, a 100-minute documentary narrated by Meryl Streep, Anne Hathaway, Kerry Washington, and Selena Gomez.

While the documentaries will initially air on CNN, the network reportedly plans to enter them in film festivals and distribute them to theaters as well.

At the 2013 Sundance Film Festival, CNN announced the acquisition of three documentaries. It acquired the rights to air Life Itself, a film adaptation of Roger Ebert's 2011 memoir, in television. The project will be directed by Steve James and executive produced by Martin Scorsese and Steven Zaillian. It is scheduled to air in 2014. The two other untitled projects are expected to air on CNN in 2013. One, from directors Michael Tucker and Petra Epperleini, centers on 9/11 and reconstructs the events at Ground Zero; the other, from director Andrew Rossi, focuses on the transformation of higher education, examining the costs and relevance of college.

CNN Films bought the television rights of Escape Fire: The Fight to Rescue American Healthcare which premiered on March 10, 2013, on CNN. The film was directed by Matthew Heineman and Susan Froemke. The film premiered on January 19, 2012, at the 2013 Sundance Film Festival and was theatrically released on October 5, 2012.

CNN Films acquired Penny Lane's Our Nixon, and CNN premiered the film in August 2013, while Cinedigm released it theatrically. The network has also then acquired the domestic television broadcast rights of the Sundance film selection Robert Stone's Pandora's Promise and aired it on CNN in November 2013 while it was theatrically released five months before.

On December 10, 2020, CNN Films teamed up with the BBC to produce a documentary about the development and manufacturing of vaccines for the COVID-19 pandemic. The documentary that is not a film is produced by British virologist-turned-filmmaker Catherine Gale who also directs with American independent filmmaker and medical journalist Caleb Hellerman, and will air in 2021 on CNN in the United States under the title Race for the Vaccine and BBC Two in the United Kingdom under the title Vaccine: The Inside Story.

== Filmography ==
Title	Release date	Director(s)	Writer(s)	Producer(s)	Ref(s)
Évocateur: The Morton Downey Jr. Movie	June 7, 2013	Seth Kramer; Daniel A. Miller; Jeremy Newberger	Daniel A. Miller	Seth Kramer; Daniel A. Miller; Jeremy Newberger	
Girl Rising	June 16, 2013	Richard E. Robbins	Aminatta Forna; Edwidge Danticat; Maaza Mengiste; Zarghuna Kargar; Marie Arana; Mona Eltahawy; Manjushree Thapa; Sooni Taraporevala; Loung Ung	Martha Adams; Richard E. Robbins; Tom Yellin	
Blackfish	July 19, 2013	Gabriela Cowperthwaite	Gabriela Cowperthwaite; Eli B. Despres	Manny Oteyza; Gabriela Cowperthwaite	
Escape Fire: The Fight to Rescue American Healthcare	March 10, 2013	Matthew Heineman; Susan Froemke	Matthew Heineman; Susan Froemke	Matthew Heineman; Susan Froemke	
The Flag	September 4, 2013	Michael Tucker; Petra Epperlein			
Our Nixon	August 1, 2013	Penny Lane	—N/a	Brian L. Frye; Penny Lane	
Pandora's Promise	November 7, 2013	Robert Stone	TBA	Jim Swartz; Susan Swartz	
An Unreal Dream: The Michael Morton Story	December 5, 2013	Al Reinert			
Sole Survivor	January 9, 2014	Ky Dickens	Ky Dickens	Susan Aurinko; Alexis Jaworski; Amy McIntyre	
41ON41	June 15, 2014	Lisa Lax; Nancy Stern Winters		Lisa Lax; Nancy Stern Winters	
Whitey: United States of America v. James J. Bulger	June 27, 2014	Joe Berlinger		Joe Berlinger; Caroline Suh	
Life Itself	July 4, 2014	Steve James	TBA	Garrett Basch	
Documented	June 29, 2014	Jose Antonio Vargas; Ann Lupo	Jose Antonio Vargas	Jose Antonio Vargas	
Lady Valor: The Kristin Beck Story	September 4, 2014	Mark Herzog; Sandrine Orabona		Mark Herzog; Christopher Cowen	
More than a Game	October 24, 2014	Kristopher Belman	Kristopher Belman; Brad Hogan	Kristopher Belman; Harvey Mason, Jr. Kevin Mann; Matthew Perniciaro	
Ivory Tower	November 20, 2014	Andrew Rossi	Andrew Rossi	Andrew Rossi; Kate Novack	
Dinosaur 13	December 11, 2014	Todd Douglas Miller	TBA	Todd Douglas Miller	
Sunshine Superman	May 22, 2015	Marah Strauch	Marah Strauch	Marah Strauch; Eric Bruggemann	
Glen Campbell: I'll Be Me	June 28, 2015	James Keach	—N/a	James Keach; Trevor Albert	
Fresh Dressed	September 3, 2015	Sacha Jenkins	Sacha Jenkins	Nasir Jones; Marcus A. Clarke	
Steve Jobs: The Man in the Machine	September 4, 2015	Alex Gibney	Alex Gibney	Alex Gibney	
The Hunting Ground	November 22, 2015	Kirby Dick	Kirby Dick	Amy Ziering	
Holy Hell	September 1, 2016	Will Allen	—N/a	Will Allen; Tracey Harnish; Alexandra Johnes	
We Will Rise	October 12, 2016				
Enlighten Us: The Rise and Fall of James Arthur Ray	December 3, 2016	Jenny Carchman	—N/a	Allyson Luchak	
Now More Than Ever: The History of Chicago	January 1, 2017	Peter Pardini	—N/a	Chicago	
Unseen Enemy	April 7, 2017	Janet Tobias	Janet Tobias	Janet Tobias; Peter Klein; Rogger Lopez; Michael Erhenzwei	
Elián	August 24, 2017	Ross McDonnell; Tim Golden	Tim Golden	Alex Gibney; Trevor Birney	
The Reagan Show	September 4, 2017	Pacho Velez; Sierra Pettengill	Francisco Bello; Josh Alexander	Dan Cogan; Amy Entelis; Houston King; Regina Scully	
Legion of Brothers	September 24, 2017	Greg Barker	—N/a	Amy Entelis; Vinnie Malhotra	
Jeremiah Tower: The Last Magnificent	November 12, 2017	Lydia Tenaglia	—N/a	Susan Porretta	
Trophy	January 14, 2018	Shaul Schwarz; Christina Clusiau	—N/a	Lauren Haber; Julia Nottingham	
RBG	May 4, 2018	Betsy West; Julie Cohen		Betsy West; Julie Cohen	
Three Identical Strangers	June 29, 2018	Tim Wardle		Becky Read; Grace Hughes-Hallett	
American Jail	July 1, 2018	Roger Ross Williams	Roger Ross Williams	Roger Ross Williams; Femke Wolting; Bruno Felix	
Love, Gilda	September 21, 2018	Lisa Dapolito		Bronwyn Berry; Lisa Dapolito; James Tumminia	
Apollo 11	March 1, 2019	Todd Douglas Miller	—N/a	Todd Douglas Miller; Thomas Petersen; Evan Krauss	
Scandalous	November 15, 2019	Mark Landsman			
Linda Ronstadt: The Sound of My Voice	January 1, 2020	Rob Epstein; Jeffrey Friedman	—N/a	James Keach; Michele Farinola; Rob Epstein; Jeffrey Friedman	
John Lewis: Good Trouble	September 27, 2020	Dawn Porter	—N/a	Erika Alexander; Ben Arnon	
Dreamland: The Burning of Black Wall Street	May 31, 2021	Salima Koroma	—N/a	Salima Koroma	
LFG	June 24, 2021	Andrea Nix Fine; Sean Fine	—N/a	Andrea Nix Fine; Sean Fine; Abby Greensfelder	
Lady Boss: The Jackie Collins Story	June 27, 2021	Laura Fairrie	—N/a	John Battsek; Lizzie Gillett; Stuart Ford; Amy Entelis; Courtney Sexton; Mark Bell; Bonnie Voland; Andrew Ruhemann	
Roadrunner: A Film About Anthony Bourdain	July 16, 2021	Morgan Neville	—N/a	Morgan Neville; Caitrin Rogers	
The Lost Sons	September 26, 2021	Ursula Macfarlane	—N/a	Amy Entelis; Courtney Sexton; Ross M. Dinerstein; Liesel Evans; Gagan Rehill	
Julia	November 5, 2021	Julie Cohen; Betsy West	—N/a	Julie Cohen; Betsy West; Justin Wilkes; Sara Bernstein; Ron Howard; Brian Grazer; Alex Prud'homme; Bob Spitz	
The Hunt for Planet B	November 20, 2021	Nathaniel Kahn	—N/a	Nathaniel Kahn; Bonnie Hlinomaz; Sandra Evers-Manly; Carleen Beste; Matt Mountain; Lawrence B. Benenson; Gerry Ohrstrom; Alberto Conti	
Citizen Ashe	December 3, 2021	Rex Miller; Sam Pollard	—N/a	Rex Miller; Steven Cantor; Anna Godas; Jamie Schultz; Beth Hubbard; Jeanne Moutoussamy-Ashe	
Carole King & James Taylor: Just Call Out My Name	January 2, 2022	Frank Marshall	—N/a	Frank Marshall	
Navalny	April 11, 2022	Daniel Roher	—N/a	Daniel Roher	
Gabby Giffords Won't Back Down	July 15, 2022	Julie Cohen; Betsy West	—N/a	Lisa Espramer; Sam Jinishian	
Glitch: The Rise & Fall of HQ Trivia	March 5, 2023	Salima Koroma	—N/a	Ken Druckerman; Banks Tarver; Amy Entelis; Courtney Sexton; Dylan Abruscato; Brandon Teitel; Olivia Snyder-Spak; Kevin Vargas	
Little Richard: I Am Everything	April 21, 2023	Lisa Cortés	—N/a	Lisa Cortés; Robert Friedman; Liz Yale Marsh; Caryn Caputosto; Mike Powers; Gus Wenner; Jason Fine	
Blue Carbon: Nature’s Hidden Power	April 21, 2024	Nicolas Brown	—N/a	—N/a	
Carville: Winning Is Everything, Stupid!	October 5, 2024	Matt Tyrnauer	—N/a	Matt Tyrnauer; Ryan Rothmaier; Corey Reeser; Susan Mccue; Graham High	
Luther: Never Too Much	January 1, 2025	Dawn Porter	—N/a	Trish D Chetty; Ged Doherty; Jamie Foxx; Datari Turner; Leah Smith	
Super/Man: The Christopher Reeve Story	February 2, 2025	Ian Bonhôte; Peter Ettedgui	Ian Bonhôte; Peter Ettedgui; Otto Burnham	Robert Ford; Lizzie Gillett; Ian Bonhôte	
Prime Minister	June 13, 2025	Lindsay Utz; Michelle Walshe	—N/a	Cass Avery; Leon Kirkbeck; Gigi Pritzker; Rachel Shane; Katie Peck; Clarke Gayford	
I'm Chevy Chase and You're Not	January 1, 2026	Marina Zenovich	—N/a	P. G. Morgan; Isabel San Vargas; Austin Wilkin	
Top of the World	September 7, 2026	Julie Cohen; Betsy West	—N/a	Ryan Biegel; Vicky Liu; Holly Siegel	
