= Best Bits =

Best Bits may refer to:

== Television ==
- Best Bits (New Zealand TV series), a New Zealand television program
- Best Bits (Australian TV series), an Australia adaptation of the New Zealand television program

== Music ==
- Best Bits (album), a compilation album by Roger Daltrey
- "Best Bits", a song on the 2011 album Eavesdropping on the Songs of Whales by The Parlotones
