= Irin Carmon =

Journalist and author

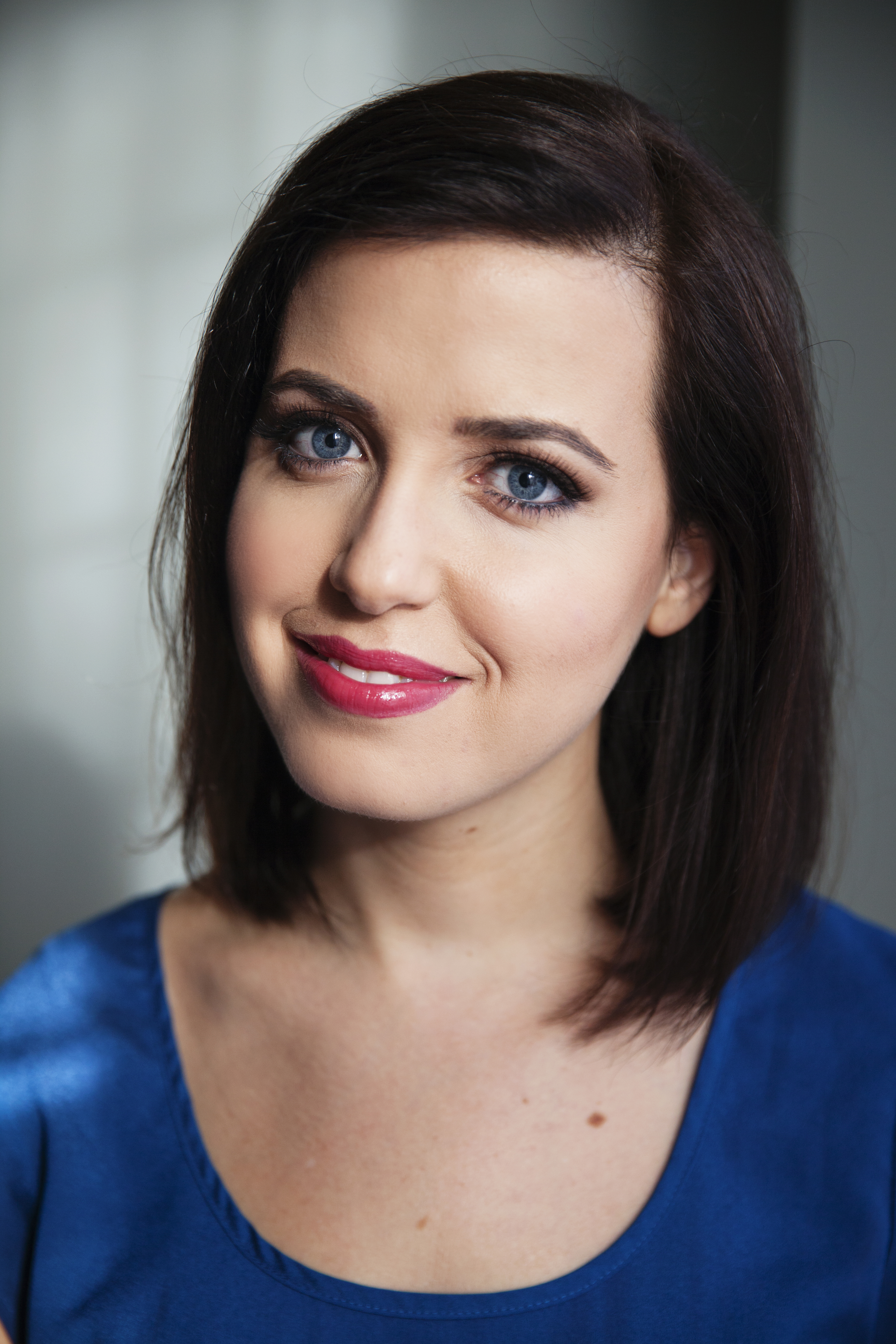
- Born: 1983 or 1984 (age 42–43)
- Education: Harvard University (BA)
- Occupations: political commentator, television personality, journalist

Irin Carmon (English: /ɪˈrɪn kɑːrˈmoʊn/) born (1983/1984) is an Israeli-American journalist and commentator. She is a senior correspondent at New York Magazine, and a CNN contributor. She is co-author of Notorious RBG: The Life and Times of Ruth Bader Ginsburg. Previously, she was a national reporter at MSNBC, covering women, politics, and culture for the website and on air. She was a visiting fellow in the Program for the Study of Reproductive Justice at Yale Law School.

In 2011, she was named one of Forbes' "30 under 30" in media and featured in New York Magazine as a face of young feminism. She received the November 2011 Sidney award from The Sidney Hillman Foundation recognizing her reporting on the Mississippi Personhood Initiative for Salon. Mediaite named her among four in its award for Best TV pundit of 2014.

== Early life ==
Carmon is Jewish and was born in Israel, the granddaughter of Zionists who lived in Palestine during World War II. She grew up on Long Island. She is a naturalized citizen of the United States.

A graduate of Waldorf School of Garden City in 2001, Carmon attended Harvard College and graduated in 2005 with an AB in Literature, magna cum laude.

While at Harvard, Carmon wrote for The Harvard Crimson and the Let's Go series of travel guides. Her senior thesis was titled, "Genealogies of Catastrophe: Yehuda Amichai’s Lo Me'Achshav, Lo Me'kan and Ricardo Piglia's Respiración artificial."

== Career ==
Early in her career, Carmon wrote regularly for the Boston Globe, the Village Voice, and The Anniston Star. She was a media reporter for the fashion-industry trade journal Women's Wear Daily from 2006 to 2009.

Carmon was a Jezebel staff writer from 2009 to 2011. She wrote a post calling The Daily Show a "boys' club where women's contributions are often ignored and dismissed", and opining that then-correspondent Olivia Munn was only hired on the show because of her status as a sex symbol. The women of the Daily Show responded with an open letter defending their workplace. In response to criticism that she failed to provide adequate time for comment, Carmon posted three brief emails with one Daily Show publicist, which occurred one week before the story was published. Two years later, Carmon wrote a polemic against her critics.

From 2011 to 2013, Carmon was a staff writer for Salon. Her Salon coverage of Eden Foods drew attention to the organic food company's lawsuit against the contraception mandate of the Affordable Care Act. Her piece was used in an Appeals Court ruling as evidence against Eden Foods' claim of a religious freedom motive. In October 2012, she and Jezebel founder Anna Holmes started the trending #sorryfeminists hashtag that mocked negative stereotypes of feminists.

In June 2013, Carmon was hired full-time by MSNBC. She has written for MSNBC.com and contributed on the shows The Reid Report, Melissa Harris-Perry, and All In with Chris Hayes. Mediaite named her in a four-way tie among the "Best TV Pundits" of 2014 for bringing "a comprehensive understanding to women's health and justice issues that goes beyond the usual talking points." In January 2015, New York Magazine reported that Carmon would be co-authoring the biography Notorious R.B.G.: The Life and Times of Ruth Bader Ginsburg with Shana Knizhnik, the creator of the Notorious R.B.G. blog. The book was released in October 2015 and debuted at #7 on the New York Times Best Seller list. In February 2015, Carmon conducted an exclusive interview for MSNBC with Ruth Bader Ginsburg for The Rachel Maddow Show.

In late 2017 and early 2018, Carmon teamed up with the Washington Post to break the news of sexual harassment and assault allegations against Charlie Rose, as well as CBS’s knowledge of his conduct. That work won a 2018 Mirror Award from the Newhouse School at Syracuse University.

In July 2018, Carmon was hired by New York Magazine as a senior correspondent. In November 2018, she was hired by CNN as a contributor.

In 2025, she published Unbearable: Five Women and the Perils of Pregnancy in America, about what has gone wrong with pregnancy in America; the book was a finalist for the 2026 New York Public Library’s Helen Bernstein Book Award for Excellence in Journalism.

== Bibliography ==
- Unbearable: Five Women and the Perils of Pregnancy in America. (Simon & Schuster). 2025. ISBN 978-1-668-03260-2
- Notorious RBG: The Life and Times of Ruth Bader Ginsburg. Dey Street Books. 2015. ISBN 978-0062415837.
- Let's Go 2003 Italy. Let's Go Travel Guides. 2002. ISBN 0312305818.
- Let's Go 2003 Spain and Portugal: Including Morocco. Let's Go Travel Guides. 2002. ISBN 0312305958.
