= Julia (2021 film) =

- Theatrical release poster
- Directed by: Julie Cohen; Betsy West
- Produced by: Julie Cohen; Betsy West; Justin Wilkes; Sara Bernstein; Holly Siegel
- Cinematography: Claudia Raschke; Nanda Fernandez Brédillard
- Edited by: Carla Gutierrez
- Music by: Rachel Portman
- Production companies: CNN Films; Imagine Documentaries; Storyville Films
- Distributed by: Sony Pictures Classics
- Release dates: September 3, 2021 (Telluride); November 5, 2021 (United States)
- Running time: 95 minutes
- Country: United States
- Language: English
- Box office: $490,820

Julia is a 2021 American documentary film directed and produced by Julie Cohen and Betsy West. The documentary chronicles the life of Julia Child. Brian Grazer and Ron Howard serve as executive producers.

The film had its world premiere at the 48th Telluride Film Festival on September 3, 2021. It was released on November 5, 2021, by Sony Pictures Classics.

== Synopsis ==
The film chronicles the life of Julia Child.

== Production ==
In October 2019, it was announced Julie Cohen and Betsy West (RBG) would direct, with executive producers Alex Prud'homme and Ron Howard under Imagine Entertainment, alongside CNN Films. The film is produced with cooperation of Child's friends and family, and the Julia Child Foundation.

== Release ==
In April 2020, Sony Pictures Classics acquired distribution rights to the film. It had its premiere at the Telluride Film Festival on September 3, 2021. It was also screened at the 2021 Toronto International Film Festival on September 12, 2021. It was released on November 5, 2021. Julia premiered on May 30, 2022 as a television premiere on CNN.

== Reception ==
The review aggregator website Rotten Tomatoes categorizing the reviews as positive or negative, assessed 98% of 96 reviews to be positive. Among the reviews, it determined an average rating of 7.80 out of 10. On Metacritic, the film has a weighted average score of 71 out of 100 based on 20 critical reviews, indicating "generally favorable" reviews.
