= Top of the World (2026 film) =

2026 American documentary short film

- Directed by: Julie Cohen; Betsy West
- Produced by: Ryan Biegel; Vicky Liu; Holly Siegel
- Cinematography: Claudia Raschke
- Edited by: Ilya Chaiken
- Production companies: Storyville Films; Montalto Pictures; Tribeca Studios; Time Studios; New Plot Films; Artemis Rising Foundation
- Distributed by: CNN Films
- Release date: August 28, 2026 (United States)
- Running time: 40 minutes
- Country: United States
- Language: English

Top of the World is a 2026 American short documentary film directed by Julie Cohen and Betsy West. It explores the history of restaurant Windows on the World, and its destruction following the September 11 attacks.

It was released in a limited release on August 28, 2026, by CNN Films, prior to a broadcast on CNN on September 7, 2026.

== Premise ==
Explores the history of the restaurant Windows on the World, which was destroyed during the September 11 attacks. Interviews included are with chef Michael Lomonaco, Cellar Master Kevin Zraly, hostess Nathalie Tolentino, prep cook, Sekou Siby, food writer Ruth Reichl, and WNBC anchor Carol Jenkins. Denis Leary provides the voice of restaurant developer Joe Baum.

== Production ==
Marc Murphy, a chef who previously worked at Windows on the World, appeared as a guest on The Kitchen, and gave a copy of the book The Most Spectacular Restaurant in the World by Tom Roston, to the hosts. Katie Lee Biegel gave the book to her husband Ryan Biegel, and the two decided it should be a documentary film. The two faced struggles in raising financing for the film. Julie Cohen and Betsy West were the first choices of the Biegels to direct the film, with two scouring a Facebook page for the restaurant to find former employees.

In May 2026, it was announced Julie Cohen and Betsy West had directed a documentary short revolving around on Windows of the World, with CNN Films set to distribute.

== Release ==
It was released in a limited release on August 28, 2026, by CNN Films, prior to a broadcast on CNN on September 7, 2026. It will be released on HBO Max on October 8, 2026.
