= Michelle Walshe =

Film director and entrepreneur

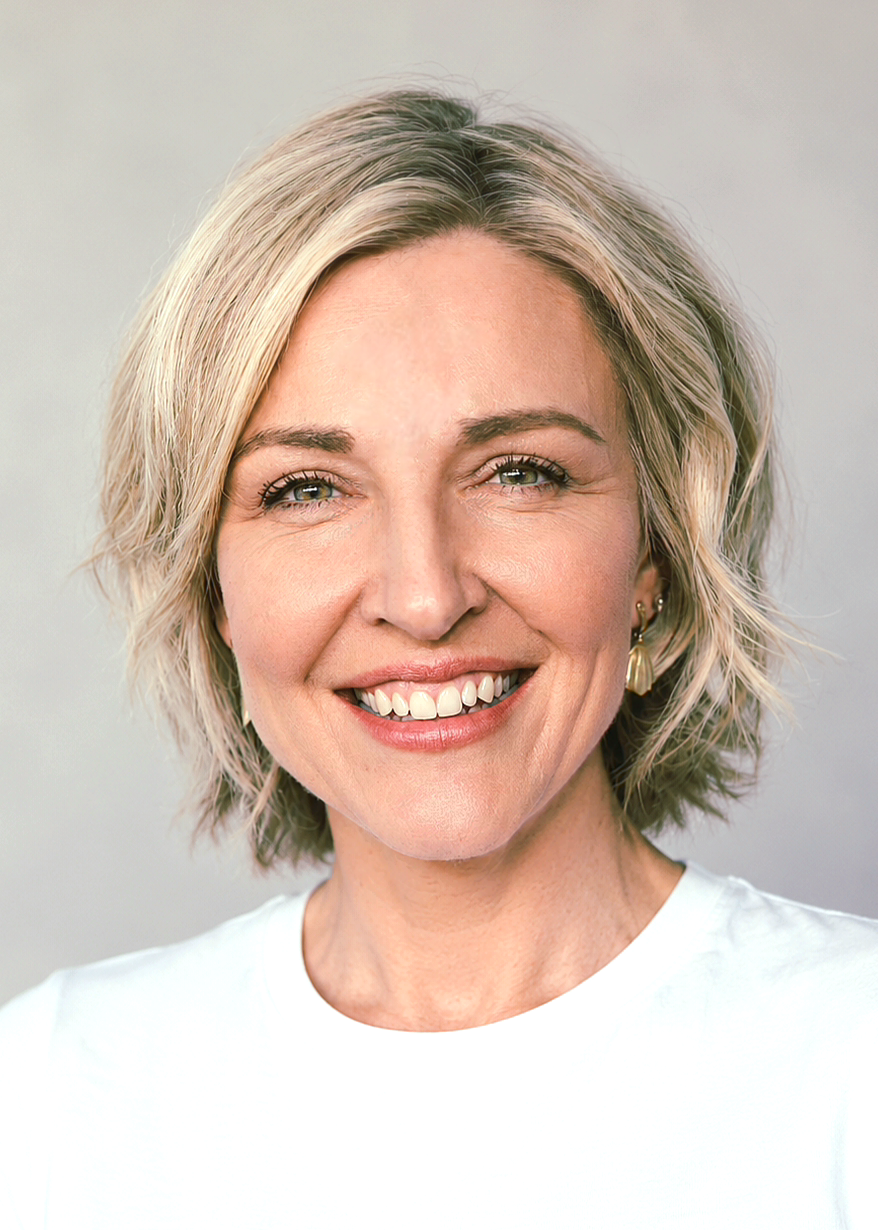
- Michelle Walshe
- Born: Canberra, Australia
- Occupations: Film director, producer, entrepreneur
- Notable work: Chasing Great, Prime Minister
- Spouse: Leon Kirkbeck

Michelle Walshe is an Australian-born New Zealand film director and producer. She is best known for co-directing the documentary Prime Minister (2025), which premiered at the 2025 Sundance Film Festival and won the Audience Award for World Cinema Documentary, and for co-directing Chasing Great (2016) with Justin Pemberton, which became New Zealand's highest-grossing theatrical documentary.

In 2026, Prime Minister won two awards at the 47th News and Documentary Emmy Awards, in the categories of Best Documentary and Outstanding Politics and Government Documentary.

== Early life ==
Walshe was born in Canberra, Australia. She later worked in the screen industry in the United Kingdom before relocating to New Zealand in 2001.

== Career ==
=== Early career ===
After moving to New Zealand, Walshe worked for production companies Greenstone and Eyeworks. In 2008 she co-founded Augusto Productions with Leon Kirkbeck. The company grew into a multidisciplinary creative agency and production group with offices in Auckland and New York, working across documentary, advertising, and branded content. The group of companies, which includes Augusto, Dark Doris, Ballyhoo, and CornerStore, was subsequently renamed UFO Rodeo and holds B Corporation certification.

In 2014, Walshe co-directed Short Poppies, a mockumentary television comedy series created by and starring Rhys Darby, alongside co-director Jemaine Clement. The series was produced by Augusto for TVNZ and subsequently distributed by Netflix, Hulu, and Channel 7.

=== Chasing Great (2016) ===
Walshe co-directed Chasing Great with Justin Pemberton, a feature documentary following All Blacks captain Richie McCaw and his 2015 campaign to lead New Zealand to back-to-back Rugby World Cup victories. The film was given unprecedented access to McCaw and his personal archive.

Chasing Great set a record on its opening day for a New Zealand documentary and became the country's highest-grossing theatrical documentary. The film received three nominations at the 2017 Rialto Channel New Zealand Film Awards (the Moas), including Best Documentary and Best Documentary Director for Walshe and Pemberton.

=== Prime Minister (2025) ===
Walshe co-directed Prime Minister with American filmmaker Lindsay Utz. The documentary follows former New Zealand Prime Minister Jacinda Ardern across her five years in office (2017–2023), drawing on audio recordings made for the Alexander Turnbull Library's Political Diaries project and home footage recorded by Ardern's husband Clarke Gayford, who also served as a producer and cinematographer.

The film premiered at the 2025 Sundance Film Festival on 24 January 2025, where it won the Audience Award in the World Cinema Documentary Competition. It subsequently won the Audience Award at the Sydney Film Festival.

Prime Minister was distributed theatrically in the United States by Magnolia Pictures, with HBO Documentary Films and CNN Films holding broadcast rights. It received a wide theatrical release in New Zealand in September 2025, recording the strongest opening week for a New Zealand documentary in seven years, before streaming on Netflix in New Zealand.

At the 47th News and Documentary Emmy Awards in May 2026 at Jazz at Lincoln Center in New York, the film won awards for Best Documentary, and Outstanding Politics and Government Documentary.

=== CoachMate ===
Walshe is co-founder and chief executive of CoachMate, a sports technology platform designed to support volunteer coaches, teachers and parents in grassroots sport. Co-founded with former professional footballer Leigh Kenyon, the platform partners with large sports organisations to support their grassroots delivery.

Partners include New Zealand Football, Basketball New Zealand, Golf New Zealand, Golf Australia, Cricket Australia, and Hockey New Zealand.

In 2024, CoachMate was shortlisted for the Tech Breakthrough category at the Leaders in Sport Awards, a globally recognised celebration of innovation in the sports industry.

In 2026, CoachMate was selected by UEFA as one of a small group of startups to participate in the Champions Innovate: Budapest 2026 programme, a global innovation initiative run in partnership with the Hungarian Football Federation ahead of the 2026 UEFA Champions League final.

== Filmography ==
| Year | Title | Role | Notes |
|---|---|---|---|
| 2014 | Short Poppies | Director | TV series; co-directed with Jemaine Clement |
| 2016 | Chasing Great | Co-director | Co-directed with Justin Pemberton |
| 2025 | Prime Minister | Co-director | Co-directed with Lindsay Utz |

== Awards and recognition ==
| Year | Award | Category | Work | Result |
|---|---|---|---|---|
| 2017 | Rialto Channel New Zealand Film Awards | Best Documentary | Chasing Great | Nominated |
| 2017 | Rialto Channel New Zealand Film Awards | Best Documentary Director | Chasing Great (with Justin Pemberton) | Nominated |
| 2025 | Sundance Film Festival | Audience Award, World Cinema Documentary | Prime Minister | Won |
| 2025 | Sydney Film Festival | Audience Award | Prime Minister | Won |
| 2026 | 47th News and Documentary Emmy Awards | Best Documentary | Prime Minister | Won |
| 2026 | 47th News and Documentary Emmy Awards | Outstanding Politics and Government Documentary | Prime Minister | Won |

== Personal life ==
Walshe is married to Leon Kirkbeck, with whom she co-founded Augusto in 2008. Kirkbeck serves as Managing Director of UFO Rodeo and co-hosts The Cryptid Factor podcast alongside Rhys Darby. The couple have four children and are based in Auckland, New Zealand.
