= Nabbed =

Nabbed may refer to:

- Nabbed or arrested, the act of apprehending and taking a person into custody
- Nabbed (TV series), a New Zealand reality television show
