= Best Bits (Australian TV series) =

- Presented by: Sam Mac
- Country of origin: Australia
- Original language: English
- No. of series: 1
- No. of episodes: 8

Production
- Producer: Josh Thomson
- Running time: 30 minutes (incl. advertisements)
- Production company: The Down Low Concept

Original release
- Network: Seven Network
- Release: 29 March – 31 May 2016

Best Bits is an Australian comedy show, where a panel of comedians comment on video clips taken from television during the week prior. The show is produced by Seven in Australia and is based on the New Zealand show Best Bits.

The first series premiered on the Seven Network on 29 March 2016.

== Format ==
The show is recorded in front of a live audience. Each week the host, along with a recurring panel of four comedians, share brief video clips taken from television programmes, commercials, and infomercials from both Australian and international broadcasters that were broadcast during the past week. The panelists then make observations and jokes (usually of a satirical nature) about what they have seen.

== Episodes ==
=== Series overview ===
Series	Episodes	Originally aired	
Series	Episodes	First aired	Last aired
1	8	29 March 2016	31 May 2016

=== Season 1 (2016) ===
Ep #	Airdate	Timeslot	Guests	Viewers
1	29 March 2016	10pm Tuesday	Heath Franklin, Mel Buttle, Harley Breen, Lawrence Mooney	364,000
2	5 April 2016	10pm Tuesday	Heath Franklin, Fiona O'Loughlin, Jesse Mulligan, Lawrence Mooney	368,000
3	19 April 2016	10pm Tuesday	Heath Franklin, Tegan Higganbotham, Sammy J, Jesse Mulligan	311,000
4	3 May 2016	10pm Tuesday	Heath Franklin, Felicity Ward, Stephen K. Amos, Lawrence Mooney	292,000
5	10 May 2016	9.45pm Tuesday	Heath Franklin, Claire Hooper, Daniel Sloss, Joel Creasey	315,000
6	17 May 2016	9.45pm Tuesday	Heath Franklin, Mel Buttle, Lloyd Langford, Matt Okine	332,000
7	24 May 2016	10pm Tuesday	Heath Franklin, Mel Buttle, Matt Okine, Claire Hooper	256,000
8	31 May 2016	10pm Tuesday	Joel Creasey, James Acaster, Nish Kumar, Harley Breen	259,000
