= Shana Knizhnik =

American lawyer and author

Shana Knizhnik (born August 22, 1988) is an American lawyer and author from Philadelphia. She is best known for her New York Times bestselling book, Notorious R.B.G.: The Life and Times of Ruth Bader Ginsburg, co-written with MSNBC reporter Irin Carmon. She is currently a Senior Staff Attorney in the American Civil Liberties Union's LGBTQ & HIV Project.

== Early life and education ==
Knizhnik is Jewish. She graduated from Julia R. Masterman School (2006), the Columbia College, Columbia University (2010), and the New York University School of Law (2015). While at Columbia, Shana competed in the American Mock Trial Association and served as an Assistant Coach for Columbia Mock Trial. During her time at NYU, she served as an Articles Editor of the New York University Law Review and served on the Boards of the Coalition for Law and Representation and OUTLaw and performed in the NYU Law Revue and the a cappella group Substantial Performance. She interned at the American Civil Liberties Union, the Public Defender Service for the District of Columbia, and the Legal Aid Society. Upon her graduation, Knizhnik went on to clerk for Dolores Sloviter of the United States Court of Appeals for the Third Circuit. Following her clerkship, she worked as a Legal Fellow at the American Civil Liberties Union of the District of Columbia, and then as a public defender for the Legal Aid Society in Manhattan.

== Notorious R.B.G. ==
While attending NYU Law in June 2013, Knizhnik started the blog Notorious R.B.G. in response to several dissenting opinions authored by Supreme Court Justice Ruth Bader Ginsburg. The blog quickly went viral and gained media attention within its first few days. Knizhnik created Notorious R.B.G. shirts to go along with the blog, of which she sold roughly 2,000 within the first two months.

In January 2015, it was announced that Knizhnik would co-author a biography of Justice Ginsburg with Irin Carmon, to be titled Notorious R.B.G.: The Life and Times of Ruth Bader Ginsburg. The book was released in October 2015 and debuted at No. 7 on The New York Times Best Seller list. In 2017, The book was named one of the top ten books for the 2017 Amelia Bloomer Book List (now Rise: A Feminist Book Project). The book was also nominated for the 2016 Alex Award and the 2019 YALSA Excellence in Nonfiction Award,

Carmon and Knizhnik appear in the 2018 Oscar-nominated documentary, RBG.

In 2016, Knizhnik was named one of Forbes 30 Under 30 in Media.

== Intersex Activism ==
In October 2020, on Intersex Awareness Day, Knizhnik published “I’m Coming Out as Intersex After Years of Keeping it a Secret” in Teen Vogue.

She was the Consulting Producer on the 2023 Emmy-nominated documentary feature, Every Body, about the history of medical treatment of intersex people and the intersex rights movement.
