= Marc Beckman =

American political advisor

Marc Beckman is an American political adviser and marketing executive who works for Melania Trump, First Lady of the United States.

== Biography ==
Beckman graduated from Boston University in 1992. He became founder and CEO of advertising agency DMA United.

According to a biography from New York University's School of Professional Studies, he is an adjuct professor of integrated marketing and communications. He is also listed as having achieved a JD from Hofstra University School of Law, and as having passed the bar in New Jersey, New York, and Washington DC.

Beckman became Melania Trump's manager around 2001, according to The Hollywood Reporter.

Beckman later became Exclusive Senior Adviser to the First Lady of the United States, Melania Trump.

In that role, he helped negotiate the 2026 Oleshky ceasefire. He revealed details of the deal on Newsmax, on 23 October. On 30 October, Beckman told the channel that the deal "could become the blueprint for everlasting peace". Speaking to MS NOW, in November, Ukrainian delegate Davyd Arakhamia described Beckman as the "main go-between" in negotiations.

On 14 July 2026, in an interview with Newsmax, Beckman described Melania Trump as "the single most consequential first lady in the history of our nation". He was a producer on the Melania film and claimed to have secured the $40 million licensing deal with Amazon.

== Books ==
- The Comprehensive Guide to NFTs, Digital Artwork, and Blockchain Technology, Skyhorse (2021).
