= Te Radar =

New Zealand comedian

Te Radar (born Andrew J. Lumsden) is a New Zealand comedian and television personality.

Lumsden studied law at the University of Otago, but abandoned his original course of study and went through Theatre Studies at Allen Hall. He adapted his original nickname of "Radar" (after the character Radar in television series M*A*S*H), adding the Māori Te ("The") to the front for added distinction.

Te Radar's comedy often focuses on his interests in travel and history. As a result, his work has led to him presenting radio travel documentaries for Radio New Zealand. His 2004 radio show Dispatches from the Holy Lands, chronicling his travels through the Arab-Israeli conflict resulted in the Television New Zealand documentary War Tourist – Christmas in Bethlehem. In 2006, Te Radar fronted a three-part documentary Hidden in the Numbers, which examined the changing face of New Zealand culture. This was followed by two further television series, Off the Radar and Homegrown. Off the Radar saw Te Radar's attempt at sustainable living, spending ten months working on a small allotment. The show rated highly, and led to the publication on an accompanying book. The series was followed by a sequel, Radar's Patch, which won the 2010 award for Best Information/Lifestyle programme.

In 2013 he presented Best Bits. He was replaced by Jesse Mulligan the following year. In 2017 he starred in Te Radar's Chequered Past, a series telling the stories of "New Zealand’s most colourful characters, both infamous and largely forgotten." This series was built on his popular Eating the Dog stage show.

In 2022 he was presented with a Scroll of Honour from the Variety Artists Club of New Zealand for his contribution to New Zealand entertainment.
