= Gabby Giffords Won't Back Down =

- Theatrical release poster
- Directed by: Julie Cohen; Betsy West
- Produced by: Lisa Espramer; Sam Jinishian
- Cinematography: Dyanna Taylor
- Edited by: Ilya Chaiken
- Music by: Miriam Cutler
- Production companies: CNN Films; Time Studios; Storyville Films; Lisa Espramer Entertainment
- Distributed by: Briarcliff Entertainment
- Release dates: March 12, 2022 (SXSW); July 15, 2022 (United States)
- Running time: 97 minutes
- Country: United States
- Language: English
- Box office: $134,098

Gabby Giffords Won't Back Down is a 2022 American documentary film directed by Julie Cohen and Betsy West. It follows Gabrielle Giffords as she recovers from the 2011 shooting.

It had its world premiere at South by Southwest on March 12, 2022. It was released on July 15, 2022, by Briarcliff Entertainment.

== Premise ==
The film follows the recovery and aftermath of the 2011 assassination attempt of congresswoman Gabrielle Giffords. Giffords becomes partially paralyzed and has a language impairment aphasia.

== Production ==
Initially, the film was set to follow Gabrielle Giffords as she toured the country to support her cause, but was scrapped due to the COVID-19 pandemic. Mark Kelly provided the filmmakers footage of Giffords recovery, which he shot while she was in the hospital.

In January 2022, it was announced Julie Cohen and Betsy West would direct a documentary film revolving around Gabrielle Giffords, with CNN Films and Time Studios set to produce.

== Release ==
The film had its world premiere at South by Southwest on March 12, 2022. Shortly after, Briarcliff Entertainment acquired distribution rights to the film, and set it for a July 15, 2022, release. The film premiered on CNN on Sunday, November 20, 2022.

== Reception ==
In the United States and Canada, the film earned $75,124 from 302 theaters in its opening weekend.

=== Critical response ===
The review aggregator website Rotten Tomatoes reported an approval rating of 100% based on 47 reviews, with an average rating of 8/10. The website's consensus reads, "Inspirational and unabashedly political, Gabby Giffords Won't Back Down pays passionate tribute to its resilient subject."
