= Prime Minister (film) =

Documentary film about Jacinda Ardern

- Theatrical release poster
- Directed by: Michelle Walshe; Lindsay Utz
- Produced by: Cass Avery; Leon Kirkbeck; Clarke Gayford; Gigi Pritzker; Rachel Shane; Katie Peck
- Starring: Jacinda Ardern
- Cinematography: Clarke Gayford; Leon Kirkbeck; Thorsten Thielow
- Edited by: Grace Zahrah; Enat Sidi
- Music by: Sofia degli Alessandri
- Production companies: MWM; Dark Doris Entertainment
- Distributed by: Magnolia Pictures; HBO Documentary Films; CNN Films (United States); Universal Pictures (International)
- Release dates: 24 January 2025 (Sundance); 13 June 2025 (United States)
- Running time: 101 minutes
- Countries: United States; New Zealand
- Language: English
- Box office: $885,600

Prime Minister is a 2025 documentary film about Jacinda Ardern, the prime minister of New Zealand from 2017 to 2023. The film is directed by Michelle Walshe and Lindsay Utz. It premiered at the Sundance Film Festival in January 2025.

== Synopsis ==
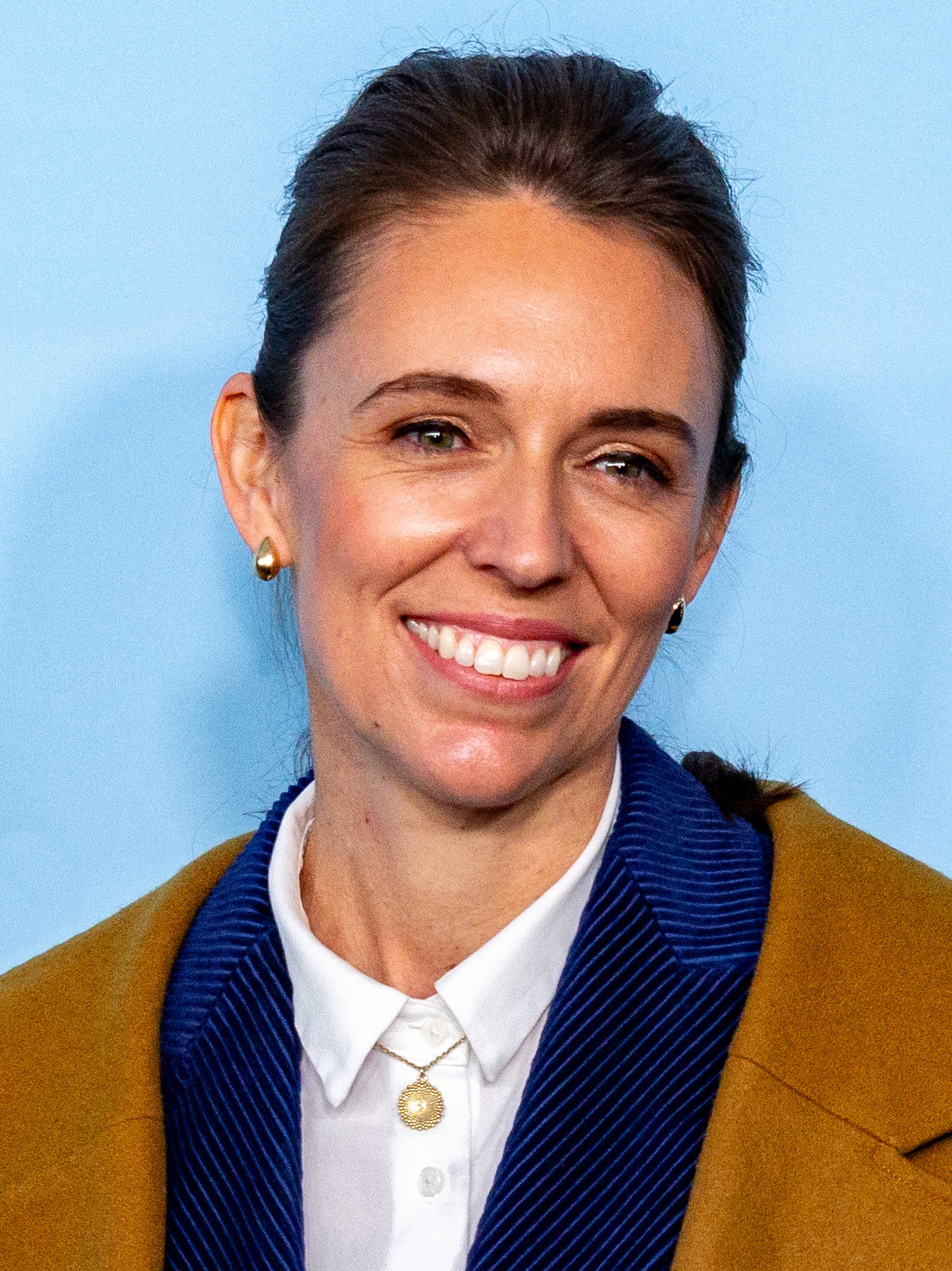
Jacinda Ardern, the subject of the film, at the 2025 Sundance Film Festival.

The 102-minute film documents the five years of Ardern's tenure, including both her political and private life. It contains audio recordings of the Political Diaries project of the Alexander Turnbull Library and home videos recorded by Ardern's husband Clarke Gayford. The film includes information on the Christchurch mosque shootings, the 2019 Whakaari / White Island eruption and the COVID-19 pandemic.

== Production and release ==
After Ardern resigned from her role as prime minister in 2023, Dark Doris Entertainment asked Ardern for permission to create a documentary about her. Ardern agreed and Dark Doris Entertainment was given Gayford's recordings for use in the film. She later said that "I was sometimes a reluctant participant". Ardern has said that she supports the film because it did not use funding by the New Zealand Film Commission. The documentary was publicly announced in June 2024, and premiered at the Sundance Film Festival in January 2025, where it won the Audience Award for World Cinema Documentary.

The film was co-produced by the companies MWM and Dark Doris Entertainment. It was directed by New Zealander Michelle Walshe and American Lindsay Utz and produced by Cass Avery, Leon Kirkbeck, Clarke Gayford, Gigi Pritzker, Rachel Shane and Katie Peck. Gayford has also been named a director of photography but was not involved in the directing or the editing.

In May 2025, Magnolia Pictures, HBO Documentary Films and CNN Films acquired distribution rights to the film, setting it for a 13 June 2025 release in the United States. It was screened for the New Zealand International Film Festival in August 2025, becoming one of the best-selling films in the history of the festival, before receiving a wider release in New Zealand on 25 September.

On 5 December 2025, the film released in the United Kingdom.

== Reception ==
The film received positive reviews from critics. On the review aggregator website Rotten Tomatoes, 93% of 43 critics' reviews are positive. The website's consensus reads: "Brisk, insightful, and gently crafted, Prime Minister offers a persuasive and inspiring portrait of Jacinda Ardern." Metacritic, which uses a weighted average, assigned the film a score of 69 out of 100, based on 10 critics, indicating "generally favorable" reviews.

After watching the film, Ardern said that "I cried through most of it, and I'm not sure if that's equivalent to laughing at your own jokes. I was very emotional watching it. I credit the storytellers for it." She has also said that "[The film-makers] took the opportunity to tell the whole story – the highs, the lows, the good, the bad, and the ugly".

Film critic Caryn James wrote for The Hollywood Reporter that "It would be a bit of an exaggeration, but just a bit, to say it trolls Donald Trump ... it includes deliberate, pointed contrasts that position Ardern as the American leader's exact opposite in their approaches and objectives."

=== Accolades ===
The film also won both the Best Documentary and Outstanding Politics and Government Documentary categories at the 47th News and Documentary Emmy Awards.

In November 2026, the film won the "Best Documentary - Feature" award at the 2026 New Zealand Screen Awards.
