= Sam Mac =

Australian broadcaster

- Born: Samuel McMillan; Adelaide, South Australia, Australia
- Education: Flinders University
- Occupations: Television reporter; producer; radio presenter; guitarist
- Years active: 2002−present
- Employer: Seven Network
- Television: Sunrise
- Spouse: Rebecca James
- Children: 3

Sam "Sam Mac" McMillan is an Australian television host, weather presenter, and entertainer. Born in Adelaide, he was a 2019 Gold Logie Nominee and is currently the weather presenter on Seven Network's breakfast show Sunrise.

== Career ==
=== TV ===
In 2010, McMillan became a regular contributor to Network 10's 7pm Project (now The Project). On the show McMillan has been a field reporter, segment host and fill-in co-host. In July 2019, he featured on The Project's 10-year anniversary special.

In 2016, McMillan began narrating the Seven Network series First Dates, and began hosting Best Bits.

In January 2016, McMillan was appointed the new weather presenter on Sunrise, replacing Edwina Bartholomew.

In June 2019, McMillan was announced as a Gold Logie Nominee, an award for the most popular presenter on Australian Television. The eventual winner was comedian Tom Gleeson. McMillan arrived at the ceremony on the Gold Coast wearing a green velvet suit riding a portable throne and accompanied by his mum Loretta and rescue cat Coco.

In 2018, McMillan was one of eight male celebrities to bare all for The Real Full Monty, a prime time special on the Seven Network. The message behind the show was to encourage men to visit a doctor and pay better attention to their health. Sam's personal connection to the show was focused on mental health. The celebrities including Shane Jacobson, Jett Kenny and Kris Smith performed a stripping routine at Sydney's Enmore Theatre in front of more than 1,000 fans. The show was a critical and ratings success.

McMillan has also produced two seasons of Sam Mac's Single Bed, a low-budget comedy/variety television show hosted from Sam's actual apartment in front of a small audience in his kitchen, which aired on Channel 31 and Foxtel on Aurora Community Television.

McMillan also has his own YouTube series titled 'Lights, Camera, Maction!'. A comedy series that contains guests such as Andy Lee, Charlie Pickering, Dave Hughes, Peter Helliar, Tom Ballard, Bondi Vet and others.

In January 2023, Seven Network announced that Mac will replace Matt Shirvington as host of the show Sydney Weekender. Shirvington will concentrate on his growing Seven News and Seven Sport commitments.

=== Radio ===
After starting at local Adelaide radio station, Fresh 92.7, McMillan scored a job doing swing announcing on SAFM and Triple M Adelaide. In December 2002, Sam began hosting the evening shift on SAFM.

In April 2003, McMillan was moved to hosting afternoons on SAFM. Triple M Adelaide changed from Classic Hits to a CHR/Pop radio format in November 2003. As part of this format change, Sam was moved to Triple M where he hosted 'The Freq Show' with model Imogen Bailey. When Triple M Adelaide and SAFM changed back their original formats in December 2005, McMillan began hosting afternoon drive. He was promoted once again in 2006, to anchor SAFM Breakfast program "Milly and Lehmo". He subsequently left this position and moved to Sydney.

McMillan hosted the Hot 30 Countdown nationally on the Austereo network in late 2006 and was known for his off-the-wall questions and stunts with celebrities.

In 2008, McMillan hosted various shows (including "Wild Turkey") on Triple M Sydney and was a panel operator/segment contributor on the Wil & Lehmo national drive radio show airing on Triple M until the show's cancellation at the end of that year.

In January 2009, McMillan became full-time host of 92.9 Em and Sam Mac Show in Perth. The breakfast show contained celebrity guests, listener phone-in's, short comedy segments and stunts.

In 2010, McMillan continued to co-host the 92.9 Breakfast show, now titled Lisa, Baz and Sam In December 2011, McMillan resigned from 92.9 and moved to Sydney to pursue television opportunities.

== Personal life ==
In June 2010, McMillan paid an emotional tribute to close friend and former radio colleague Richard Marsland who died by suicide in December 2008. Sam spoke about the tragedy to help raise awareness of depression.

McMillan studied at Improv Theatre Sydney in 2015.

In 2021, McMillan announced that he was in a relationship with Melbourne-based "business owner, marketing boss & stylist" Rebecca James, and they bought a Sydney house together later in the same year.

In April 2022, McMillan announced via Instagram that his partner Rebecca James is pregnant with their first child and are due in September.

== Music ==
In August 2019, McMillan released a children's song with The Wiggles. The song, written by McMillan, is titled "Half Man, Half Cat". The song received in excess of a million views via social media & is available on The Wiggles Official YouTube Channel. He performed it live with The Wiggles in November 2019 at the International Convention Centre Sydney in front of 5,000 kids as part of their "Party Time Big Show".
