= Short Poppies =

New Zealand television series

- Created by: Rhys Darby
- Written by: Rhys Darby; Guy Roberts; Justine Smith; Grant Lobban; Rosie Carnahan Darby
- Directed by: Jemaine Clement; Michelle Walshe
- Starring: Rhys Darby; David Farrier
- Narrated by: David Farrier
- Theme music composer: hedluv + passman
- Opening theme: "The Future!"
- Countries of origin: New Zealand; United States
- Original language: English
- No. of seasons: 1
- No. of episodes: 8

Production
- Executive producers: Rosie Carnahan Darby; Leon Kirkbeck
- Producers: Cass Avery; Paul Simms (consulting)
- Production location: New Zealand
- Running time: 22 minutes

Original release
- Network: TV One
- Release: 1 April 2014

Short Poppies is a New Zealand mockumentary TV series starring, created and written by Rhys Darby and directed by Jemaine Clement and Michelle Walshe.

It follows real-life entertainment reporter David Farrier as he talks to "extraordinary" New Zealanders who happen to live in the same small fictional town known as "The Bay". At the time of filming, Farrier worked for TVNZ's competitor, MediaWorks.

All eight episodes became available in New Zealand on 1 April 2014 through TVNZ On Demand and became available in the United States on 4 April 2014.

== Characters ==
All of the Short Poppies characters David Farrier interviews are played by Rhys Darby.

=== Terry Pole ===
Terry Pole is a lifeguard who enters and reclaims the title of "Best Legs" in the local competition. He has a one-sided soulmate relationship with Georgina (played by Georgia Hatzis), is good friends with Policeman Mike (played by Jonno Roberts) and is picked on by the other lifeguards. He is oblivious to most things going on around him, unless it is to do with his legs, including Georgina telling him they are not a couple or that one of the lifeguards has a crush on him.

=== Steve Whittle ===
Steve Whittle is a ufologist and conspiracy theorist who runs an alien abduction workshop at the library. He lives with his musician girlfriend, Elise (played by Jackie van Beek) and his mother, Tessa (played by Annie Whittle) who does not like Elise.

=== Ron Taylor ===
Ron Taylor is an amateur conservationist who loves the sea and establishes a whale watching company after spotting a whale in the bay. He used to work at the local fish and chips shop (Hook, Line & Thinker) for Colin (played by Dave Fane). After having his grandfather's boat impounded, Ron and Colin try and steal it back but are caught by Officer Mike. He is phoned by his father who states if he does not get the boat back, he is being relocated to Auckland. By the end of the series, Colin reemploys Ron to help him pay his fines and the two form a new whale watching company after Colin buys an actual boat.

=== Mary Ledbetter ===
Mary Ledbetter is a 63-year-old married woman who is the town "mover and shaker", a member of the Hillside Hat Collectors Club and the president of the Ladywalkers (a walking group for mature ladies who like to walk) who prides herself on her ability to criticise but she is more of a busy body, compulsive complainer, gossip and a bigot. Her husband, Brian (played by Ray Henwood), is quiet and takes the brunt of her criticism constantly. She lived in Australia for three weeks, which was only for her sister's wedding. She treats her dead stuffed cat, Mitzy, as though it is still alive and is social media inept (she thought Twitter was the name of a drug). She frequents the Blow n Wave Salon where she catches up on gossip and scandal.

While Mary comes across as oblivious (her hairdresser, Alex Turnbull (played by Karl Urban), states he "loves cock" and she states that he "owns a chicken farm"), it becomes apparent that she is aware that Alex is, in fact, gay.

=== Bill Napier ===
Bill is a Department of Conservation head ranger who may be too into nature, however he is very knowledgeable in New Zealand flora and fauna and even shows David a bear. He is in an estranged marriage to Linda and has two children, Flora (played by Rhys's niece, Lucy Coring) and Fauna (played by Rhys's son, Finn Darby), who have moved to Yellowstone National Park. He has a love/hate relationship with his brother-in-law, Tom (played by Cohen Holloway), who still lives in the town and intentionally goes out of his way to antagonize Bill. He leads a team of rangers. During a staff awards ceremony, he becomes obsessed with his missing coffee mug (the last gift given to him by his wife).

=== Louise Cooper ===
Louise Cooper is a local artist who "won" a commission to create the town's centerpiece by changing a rejection letter into an acceptance letter. She works as a carpark attendant (at a carpark she has created) and is a single mother of a nine-year-old boy, Zeke (played by Flynn Allen). At the end of the series, she is dating Rhod and works at Georgina's crystal shop while Georgina is on maternity leave.

=== Rhod Gainer ===
Rhod Gainer is a local lawyer who is the classic Kiwi bloke and loves cars, beer, the ladies and sexual innuendo. He has a sister, Linda (played by Darby's actual sister, Linda Darby-Coring).

=== Hayden Clarke ===
Hayden Clarke is the producer of the show and a bit of a self-righteous narcissist. He and David work for TVNZ.

=== Supporting characters ===
- David Farrier (played by David Farrier) plays a very similar version to his real life self. He works for NZTV and receives backlash from the edited trailer of the show at the end of the series.
- Brian Ledbetter (played by Ray Henwood) is the husband of Mary Ledbetter.
- Colin (played by Dave Fane) works at the local fish and chip shop and is Ron's former boss. At the end of the series, he reemploys Ron to help him pay his fines.
- Dwayne (played by Grant Lobban)
- Elsie (played by Jackie van Beek) is the girlfriend of Steve Whittle and has agoraphobia.
- Georgina (played by Georgia Hatzis) is a citizen of the town. She is possibly American and is pregnant. Lifeguard Terry Pole has an unrequited crush on her and she seems to be a part of the life of each interviewee (she is Bill's secretary, goes to the same salon as Mary and is one of Louise's art subjects). She is seen in the park with Policeman Mike and it is alluded that he is the father of her child and that the pair are dating in secret. By the end of the first series, she and Policeman Mike get engaged.
- Jeff Mason (played by Nick Rado) is a DJ on the local radio station, Radio NZFM. He also emcees the events that happen in the town.
- Lifeguard Bob (played by Guy Roberts) works with and picks on Terry.
- Lifeguard Pete (played by Vaughan King) works with and picks on Terry. However, Pete may have a crush on Terry.
- Lloyd (played by Andrew Munro)
- Policeman Mike Davies (played by Jonno Roberts) is the chief police officer in the town who the citizens describe as wearing short shorts. He may be the father of Georgina's child and secretly the pair are dating. He is good friends with lifeguard Terry Pole. Towards the beginning of the series, he didn't sign a release form so his face was blurred (badly). Mid-series, he accuses David Farrier of being the cause of the trouble that has happened since their arrival. Mike is also the Head Fisheries Officer for the town.
- Ranger Gary (played by Brett O'Gorman) is part of Bill Napier's team.
- Ranger Haley (played by Rachael Blampied) is part of Bill Napier's team. She is emotionally unstable.
- Ranger Jason (played by Josh Thomson) is part of Bill Napier's team who replaces any negative comments in the suggestion box with positive ones. He enters against Terry Pole in the Best Legs competition and books a whale watching excursion with Ron and Colin.
- Sameer (played by Jagdish Punja) is a producer at Radio NZFM, the boss of Jeff Mason and the neighbour of Mary Ledbetter. He is kind to Mary even though she thinks he cannot understand English and is quite bigoted.
- Tessa Whittle (played by Annie Whittle) is the mother of Steve Whittle and is protective of her son.
- Tom (played by Cohen Holloway) is Bill Napier's brother-in-law who blames Bill for why his sister left. He also runs a whale watching business against Ron and Colin and competes against Terry in the Best Legs competition.
- Zeke Cooper (played by Flynn Allan) is Louise Cooper's son who is self-sufficient and very independent. He does all the housework and cooking because his mother is too busy. Based on his love of cars and combustion engines, it is hinted that his father is Rhod Gainer.

=== Guest characters ===
- Alex Turnbull (played by Karl Urban) is Mary's gay hairdresser who works at Blow n Wave Salon. He states he is not related to Alexander Turnbull.
- Bear Grylls (played by Bear Grylls) plays a parody version of himself and has no time for the rangers. He complains that Bill and David's camera crew are screwing things up. When asked by Bill why he is eating bugs, he replies that the coffee is too expensive at the ranger hut.
- Karl Marx (played by Jesse Griffin) is the vice president of the car club Rhod Gainer wants to join.
- Lifeguard Jim (played by Craig Parker) is the main lifeguard who bullies Terry Pole. He reveals that he does like Terry but in small doses.
- Mr. Neal (played by Sam Neill) is Zeke Cooper's principal and Louise's former teacher. He does not like Louise but does like Zeke. He is an avid bee keeper (he has one bee) but when the bee escapes and stings Louise, he becomes enraged when Louise kills it.
- Roger Fairweather (played by Stephen Merchant) is an insurance broker who Terry Pole meets with to insure his legs. He reveals to Terry that he hates sharks because one killed his first wife and that his second wife is in a coma.

== Episodes ==
No.	Title	Written by	Original release date
1	"Terry Pole"	Rhys Darby	1 April 2014
Television entertainment reporter David Farrier visits and interviews extraordinary New Zealanders who are all from the same small coastal town. His first interviewee is lifeguard Terry Pole. Guest starring Craig Parker, Vaughan King, Cohen Holloway, Stephen Merchant, Guy Roberts, Nick Rado, Luke Andrews, Josh Thomson.
2	"Steve Whittle"	Rhys Darby	1 April 2014
David's next interviewee is ufologist, alien enthuisast and conspiracy theorist, Steve Whittle. We also briefly meet Bill Napier and Ron Taylor. Guest starring Jackie van Beek, Annie Whittle, Eli Matthewson, Thomas Elisara, Jonno Roberts.
3	"Ron Taylor"	Rhys Darby	1 April 2014
David visits conservationist, Ron Taylor, who conducts whale-watching tours in a small rowboat. Guest starring Dave Fane, Josh Thomson, Jonno Roberts, Cohen Holloway, Sarah Rose, Tony Sykes, Steve Jennings, Vaughan King, Justine Smith, Justin Curry
4	"Mary Ledbetter"	Rhys Darby	1 April 2014
David visits the home of local mover and shaker/busybody, Mary Ledbetter, who discovers that a disused walkway is being turned into a bike park. Guest starring Karl Urban, Annie Whittle, Nick Rado, Jagdish Punja, Ray Henwood, Georgia Hatzis, Jonno Roberts, Jonathan Brugh, Ora Lefebvre, Carrie Alexander, Sarah Rose, Jon Wild, Karen Staniland, Annette Perjanik, Patricia Noonan, Kathy Walker, Callum Butcher
5	"Bill Napier"	Rhys Darby	1 April 2014
David next sees Department of Conservation head ranger, Bill Napier. Bill becomes obsessed with his missing coffee mug and ends up having a scuffle with his brother in law at a family kite event. Guest starring Bear Grylls, Rachael Blampied, Josh Thomson, Brett O'Gorman, Jonno Roberts, Cohen Holloway, Leon Kirkbeck, Guy Roberts, Jarvis Kirkbeck, Joe Valentine, Elodie Gale, Greg Padda, Chris Brain.
6	"Louise Cooper"	Rhys Darby	1 April 2014
David visits local artist, Louise Cooper. Mary Ledbetter makes a brief appearance. Guest starring Jonno Roberts, Georgia Hatzis, Sam Neill, Flynn Allan, Jeremy Elwood, Michael McFadgen, Rex Cowley, Aiden Manchester.
7	"Rhod Gainer"	Rhys Darby	1 April 2014
David catches up with local lawyer and car enthusiast, Rhod Gainer. Guest starring Hamish Parkinson, Jesse Griffin, Andrew Munro, Grant Loban, Rob Callaghan, Callum Butcher, Linda Darby-Coring, Glenn Manchester, Pete Hansen, Scott Bower.
8	"David Farrier"	Rhys Darby	1 April 2014
David and the crew hold the wrap party in the town where all his interviewees are invited to attend. Guest starring Georgia Hatzis, Jonno Roberts, Ray Henwood, Nick Rado, Karl Urban, Vaughan King, Grant Loban, Lucy Coring, Josh Thomson, David Fane, Guy Roberts, Finn Darby, Cyan Corwine, Carl Leducq, Callum Butcher.

== See also ==
- List of New Zealand television series
- 2014 in New Zealand television
