= Ricardo Piglia =

Argentine writer (1941-2017)

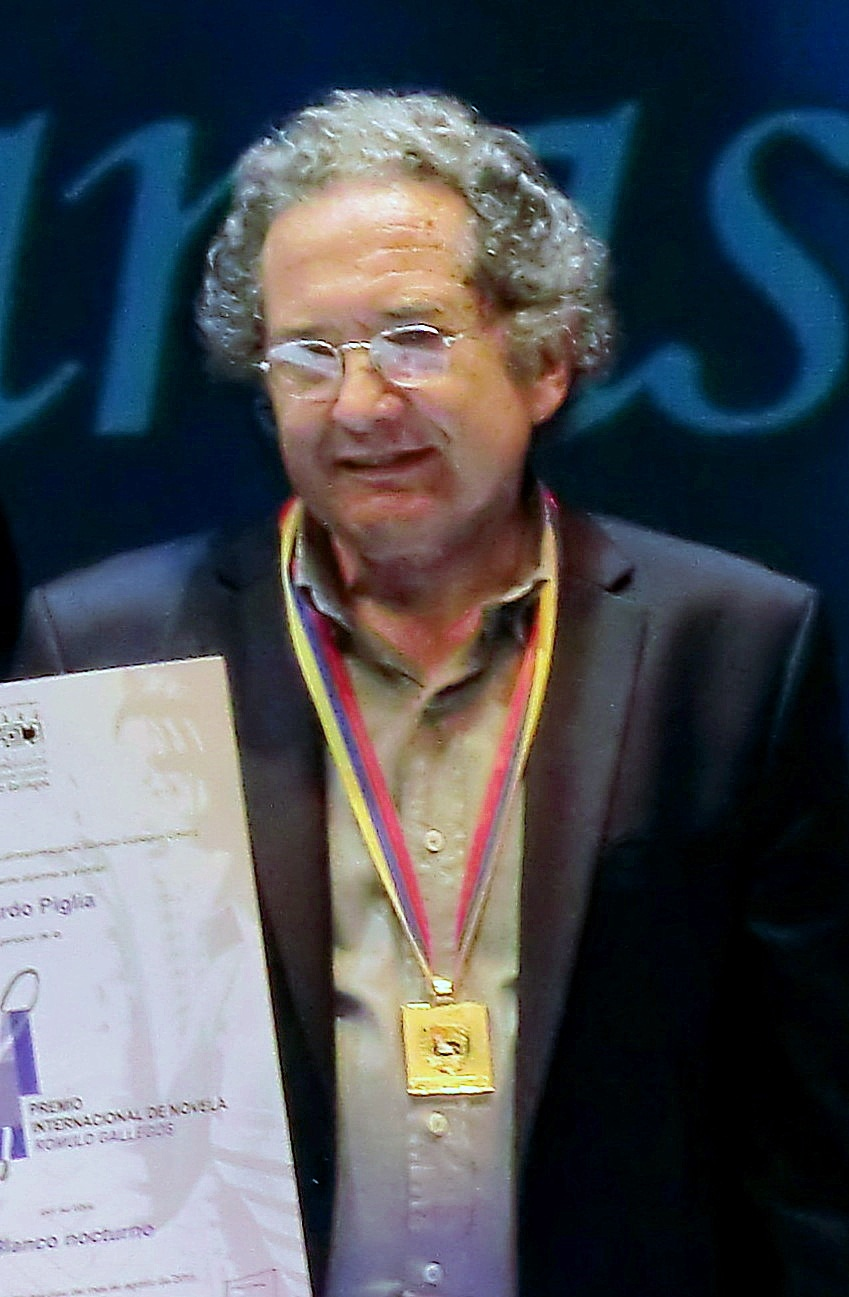
- Ricardo Piglia receiving the Rómulo Gallegos Prize. Caracas, August 2, 2011
- Born: November 24, 1941; Adrogué, Argentina
- Died: January 6, 2017 (aged 75); Buenos Aires, Argentina
- Occupations: Argentine author, critic, and scholar
- Known for: Introducing hard-boiled fiction to the Argentine public

Ricardo Piglia (November 24, 1941, in Adrogué – January 6, 2017, in Buenos Aires) was an Argentine author, critic, and scholar best known for introducing hard-boiled fiction to the Argentine public.

== Biography ==
Born in Adrogué, Piglia was raised in Mar del Plata. He studied history in 1961-1962 at the National University of La Plata.

Ricardo Piglia published his first collection of fiction in 1967, La invasión. He worked in various publishing houses in Buenos Aires and was in charge of the Serie Negra which published well-known authors of crime fiction including Dashiell Hammett, Raymond Chandler, David Goodis and Horace McCoy. A fan of American literature, he was also influenced by F. Scott Fitzgerald and William Faulkner, as well as by European authors Franz Kafka and Robert Musil.

Piglia's fiction includes several collections of short stories as well as highly allusive crime novels, among them Respiración artificial (1980, trans. Artificial Respiration), La ciudad ausente (1992, trans. The Absent City), and Blanco nocturno (2010, trans. Nocturnal Target). His criticism has been collected in Criticism and Fiction (1986), Brief Forms (1999) and The Last Reader (2005).

Piglia resided for a number of years in the United States. He taught Latin American literature at Harvard as well as at Princeton University, where he was Walter S. Carpenter Professor of Language, Literature, and Civilization of Spain from 2001 to 2011. After retirement he returned with his wife to Argentina.

In 2013 he was diagnosed with amyotrophic lateral sclerosis. Despite this, he continued working, with the help of his assistant, Luisa Fernández, on the selection of his diaries and the editing of his unpublished writings. He died of the disease on January 6, 2017, in Buenos Aires, Argentina.

== Awards and honors ==
During his lifetime Piglia received a number of awards, including the Premio internacional de novela Rómulo Gallegos (2011), Premio Iberoamericano de las Letras (2005), Premio Planeta (1997), and the Casa de las Américas Prize (1967). In 2013 he won Chile's Manuel Rojas Ibero-American Narrative Award, and in 2014 he won the Diamond Konex Award as the best writer of the decade in Argentina. In 2015 Piglia won the Prix Formentor.

On January 4, 2018, his memory was honored in New York City at "Modos infinitos de narrar: Homenaje a Ricardo Piglia," an event at which academics discussed the impact of his work on Latin American literature and intellectual history and his legacy as a literary critic and scholar.

== Works ==
Essays

- 1986 Criticism and Fiction ("Crítica y ficción")
- 1993 Argentina in Pieces ("La Argentina en pedazos")
- 1999 Brief Forms ("Formas breves")
- 2000 Dictionary of the Novel of Macedonio Fernández ("Diccionario de la novela de Macedonio Fernández")
- 2005 The Last Reader ("El último lector")

Novels

- 1980 Artificial Respiration ("Respiración artificial")
- 1992 The Absent City ("La ciudad ausente")
- 1997 Burnt Money ("Plata Quemada")
- 2010 Nocturnal Target ("Blanco nocturno")
- 2013 The Way Out ("El Camino de Ida")

Short story collections

- 1967 The Invasion ("La Invasión")
- 1975 Assumed Name ("Nombre Falso")
- 1988 Perpetual Prison ("Prisión perpetua")
- 1995 Moral Tales ("Cuentos morales")

Others

- 2015 The Diaries of Emilio Renzi: The Formative Years
- 2016 The Diaries of Emilio Renzi: The Happy Years
- 2017 The Diaries of Emilio Renzi: A Day in the Life

== Bibliography ==
- Roberto Echavarren. "La literariedad: Respiración artificial, de Ricardo Piglia", Revista Iberoamericana, University of Pittsburgh, U.S.A., vol. XLIX, October–December 1983, No. 125, pp. 997–1008.
