= RBG (film) =

- Theatrical release poster
- Directed by: Betsy West; Julie Cohen
- Produced by: Betsy West; Julie Cohen
- Starring: Ruth Bader Ginsburg; Jane Ginsburg; James Steven Ginsburg; Clara Spera; Nina Totenberg; Bill Clinton; Harry T. Edwards; Brenda Feigen; Aryeh Neier; Sharron Frontiero; Shana Knizhnik; Aminatou Sow; Frank Chi; Orrin Hatch; Arthur R. Miller; Helen Alvare; Ted Olson; Lilly Ledbetter; Eugene Scalia; Gloria Steinem; Robert Longbottom
- Cinematography: Claudia Raschke
- Edited by: Carla Gutierrez
- Music by: Miriam Cutler
- Production companies: Participant Media; CNN Films; Storyville Films
- Distributed by: Magnolia Pictures
- Release dates: January 21, 2018 (Sundance); May 4, 2018 (United States)
- Running time: 98 minutes
- Country: United States
- Language: English
- Box office: $14.4 million

RBG is a 2018 American documentary film focusing on the life and career of Ruth Bader Ginsburg, the second female Associate Justice of the Supreme Court of the United States after Sandra Day O'Connor. After premiering at the 2018 Sundance Film Festival, the film was released in the United States on May 4, 2018. The film was directed and produced by Betsy West and Julie Cohen.

The film received positive reviews from critics and grossed $14.4 million worldwide. It was chosen by the National Board of Review as the Best Documentary Film of 2018, and nominated for several other awards, including the BAFTA Award for Best Documentary. At the 91st Academy Awards, the film earned nominations for Best Documentary Feature and Best Original Song ("I'll Fight"). The film also won the Cinema for Peace Award for Women's Empowerment in 2019.

== Synopsis ==
RBG chronicles the career of U.S. Supreme Court Justice Ruth Bader Ginsburg, which spans several decades, and how she developed a legal legacy while becoming a pop culture icon. The film is a biographical depiction of Ginsburg from her birth in Brooklyn, New York, her college education and subsequent career as a law professor, her appointment to the federal judiciary by President Jimmy Carter, and eventual appointment to the Supreme Court by President Bill Clinton.

Ruth Bader was born in Brooklyn into a first-generation American Jewish family. She earned a bachelor's degree at Cornell University, where she met her husband, Martin Ginsburg; they remained married until his death in 2010. Ruth enrolled in Harvard Law School before transferring to Columbia Law School while Martin started a successful career as a New York City tax attorney. After graduating from Columbia, Ginsburg became a law professor at Rutgers Law School and Columbia Law School.

Ruth Bader Ginsburg successfully argued five of six cases regarding gender discrimination before the U.S. Supreme Court. She advocated for both men and women facing gender-based bias: among the plaintiffs she represented was Sharron Frontiero, a woman facing housing discrimination in the U.S. Air Force, and a male single parent denied Social Security benefits normally paid only to single mothers. Ginsburg argued these cases in the 1970s, when gender discrimination was rampant in U.S. society and an all-male Supreme Court was generally skeptical of claims of bias against women.

After being nominated by President Jimmy Carter, Ginsburg was confirmed to the United States Court of Appeals for the District of Columbia Circuit on June 18, 1980. Her service on the appellate court ended August 9, 1993, and she was sworn in as a U.S. Supreme Court Justice on August 10, 1993, becoming the second female justice ever appointed at that time. After frankly answering questions about abortion and discrimination at her Senate confirmation hearings, Ginsburg was confirmed by a vote of 96 to 3, which President Clinton notes was astounding given the partisan political environment of the time, let alone now.

The film includes interviews with feminist icon Gloria Steinem and NPR's Nina Totenberg on Ginsburg's trailblazing career focused on women's rights. Among the landmark cases brought before the Supreme Court, the 1996 decision that allowed female cadets to enroll at the previously all-male Virginia Military Institute (VMI) is discussed at length. Several female VMI graduates explain why the decision was important — for them personally, and in the larger struggle for women's rights.

The film also chronicles Ginsburg's status late in life as a pop culture icon, starting with the publication in 2015 of Notorious R.B.G.: The Life and Times of Ruth Bader Ginsburg, written by Shana Knizhnik and Irin Carmon. Knizhnik and Carmon also started a Notorious R.B.G. Tumblr which gained a huge following and spawned merchandise such as T-shirts and coffee mugs. The nickname is inspired by the "Notorious" honorific from the name of rap artist Notorious B.I.G. Ginsburg shows a good-natured embrace of her nickname, noting that she and the rapper have much in common: they were both born in Brooklyn.

Ginsburg's granddaughter, who appears in the film, is a graduate of Harvard Law School. She notes her graduating class was 50/50 male/female; when Ruth attended Harvard Law School, she was one of only nine female students in a class of approximately 560 total.

The film contrasts Martin Ginsburg's gregarious personality with Ruth's more stoic nature. Ruth's children note that although their mother is a brilliant lawyer, she is an awful cook. Martin says that he refrained from offering his opinions on legal matters to his wife, and she refrained from cooking after their children complained about her lack of culinary skill.

The film shows a playful side of the normally reserved Ginsburg. She engages in jovial banter with arch-conservative Justice Antonin Scalia while acknowledging their love of opera was one of the few things they shared in common. She also had a cameo role in an opera, La fille du régiment, in 2016.

Several commentators criticize disparaging remarks Ginsburg made about Trump during his campaign, noting that her comments made her vulnerable to claims of judicial bias in Supreme Court cases involving the Trump administration. (Ginsburg apologized for her remarks, and Senator Orrin Hatch opines that the formidable legal scholar is allowed to make occasional mistakes.) The film notes the left- and rightward swings of the Supreme Court during Ginsburg's tenure. As the court has tilted in a conservative direction, Ginsburg's dissents from majority opinions have become more frequent and forceful.

Despite being in her eighties and having survived colon and pancreatic cancer, Ginsburg works relentlessly late nights and often gets only a few hours of sleep. She also is shown exercising at a gym with a personal trainer. When asked how long she plans to remain on the Supreme Court, Ginsburg responds that she will stay only as long as she is able to address the cases placed before her with the full ability and integrity of her lifetime of experience in practicing law.

== Production ==
Directors Julie Cohen and Betsy West had both previously worked on projects involving Ginsburg, and in 2015 decided to make a documentary focusing solely on her. In 2016, the duo followed Ginsburg around to various meetings and speeches, including in Chicago and Washington, D.C., for a total of 20 hours, and conducted the face-to-face interview in 2017.

== Reception ==
=== Box office ===
RBG began its limited release on May 4, 2018, and grossed $577,153 from 34 theaters over its opening weekend, an average of $16,975 per venue. The film expanded to 179 theaters in its second week, making $1.2 million for the weekend and finishing 10th at the box office. Playing in 375 theaters in its third week, the film made $1.3 million on the weekend, finishing in 12th, and made $1.1 million in its fourth weekend, returning to 10th. It gross a worldwide total of $14.4 million and was one of the highest-grossing independent films of 2018.

Following Ginsberg's death in September 2020, it was announced the documentary, as well as her biopic On the Basis of Sex, would be re-released into 1,000 theaters, with box office grosses being donated to the American Civil Liberties Union Foundation.

=== Critical response ===
On the review aggregator website Rotten Tomatoes, the film holds an approval rating of 93% based on 178 reviews, and an average rating of 7.4/10. The website's critical consensus reads, "RBG might be preaching to the choir of viewers who admire Supreme Court Justice Ruth Bader Ginsburg, but it does so effectively." On Metacritic, the film has a weighted average score of 71 out of 100, based on 32 critics, indicating "generally favorable reviews".

A. O. Scott of The New York Times wrote, "The movie's touch is light and its spirit buoyant, but there is no mistaking its seriousness or its passion. Those qualities resonate powerfully in the dissents that may prove to be Justice Ginsburg's most enduring legacy, and RBG is, above all, a tribute to her voice." In her review for The Hollywood Reporter, Leslie Felperin wrote, "..there is something deeply soothing about RBG, a documentary that, like its subject, Supreme Court Justice Ruth Bader Ginsburg, is eminently sober, well-mannered, highly intelligent, scrupulous and just a teeny-weeny bit reassuringly dull."

Sheila O'Malley of RogerEbert.com was more critical, writing, "Cohen and West’s approach is so adulatory that the documentary becomes a surface-level work of hagiography." Similarly, Amir Abou-Jaoude of The Stanford Review wrote, "The documentary seems more like a middle school book report than a tribute to a crusader for women’s rights. It includes basic facts, but it does not provide any insight into Ginsburg’s legal work, life or legacy."

=== Accolades ===
Award	Date of ceremony	Category	Recipient(s) and nominee(s)	Result	Ref.
Hollywood Music in Media Awards	November 14, 2018	Original Score – Documentary	Miriam Cutler	Nominated	
Hollywood Music in Media Awards	November 14, 2018	Original Song – Documentary	Diane Warren (for "I'll Fight")	Won	
Cinema for Peace Awards	February 2019	Women’s Empowerment	Julie Cohen & Betsy West.	Won	
National Board of Review	January 8, 2019	Best Documentary Film	RBG	Won	
Cinema Eye Honors	January 10, 2019	Audience Choice Prize	RBG	Nominated	
Producers Guild of America Awards	January 19, 2019	Outstanding Producer of Documentary Theatrical Motion Pictures	Betsy West and Julie Cohen	Nominated	
Directors Guild of America Awards	February 2, 2019	Outstanding Directorial Achievement in Documentaries	Betsy West and Julie Cohen	Nominated	
British Academy Film Awards	February 10, 2019	Best Documentary	Betsy West and Julie Cohen	Nominated	
Satellite Awards	February 17, 2019	Best Documentary Film	RBG	Nominated	
Academy Awards	February 24, 2019	Best Documentary Feature	Betsy West and Julie Cohen	Nominated	
Academy Awards	February 24, 2019	Best Original Song	Diane Warren (for "I'll Fight")	Nominated	
Television Academy Honors	May 30, 2019	Outstanding Programs and Storytellers Advancing Social Change Through Television	RBG	Won	
Primetime Emmy Awards	September 14, 2019	Exceptional Merit in Documentary Filmmaking	Julie Cohen and Betsy West, produced by; Amy Entelis and Courtney Sexton, executive producers	Won	
Primetime Emmy Awards	September 14, 2019	Outstanding Directing for a Documentary/Nonfiction Program	Betsy West and Julie Cohen	Nominated	
Primetime Emmy Awards	September 14, 2019	Outstanding Picture Editing for Nonfiction Programming	Carla Gutierrez	Nominated	
Primetime Emmy Awards	September 14, 2019	Outstanding Music Composition for a Documentary Series or Special (Original Dramatic Score)	Miriam Cutler	Nominated	

== See also ==
- On the Basis of Sex, a biographical drama film focusing on Ginsburg's work to end gender discrimination, which was also released in 2018.
- October 2020 conversation on the Factual America Podcast with Julie Cohen, the co-director and co-producer of RBG, on the occasion of the passing of Justice Ginsburg.
