= Respiración artificial =

1980 novel by Ricardo Piglia

First edition (publ. Pomaire)

Respiración artificial is an Argentine novel, written by Ricardo Piglia. It was first published in 1980. Praised by critics, the work has been the subject of several studies. The epigraph which opens the novel (”We had the experience but missed the meaning, an approach to the meaning restores the experience″) is a quote by T.S Eliot and the key to understanding the novel. The back cover of the book reads: “Conceived as a system of quotes, cultural references, allusions, plagiarisms, parodies and pastiches, Piglia's novel is not only the realization of Walter Benjamin's old dream (”to make a work consisting only of quotes“); it is as well a modern and subtle detective novel″.

The first part of the novel corresponds with the epistolary genre, and it unfolds an enigmatic plot based upon four characters of different generations – the uncle, Marcelo Maggi, his nephew, the young writer Emilio Renzi, the uncle's father-in-law and the father-in-law's grandfather – and their relations with Argentina's political life from the middle nineteenth century till the 1970s.

The nexus between them is the great-grandfather's memoirs, a syphilitic in exile who commits suicide, and whose writings were kept by the family.

The second part is the one which critics find the most attractive, in which two characters discuss extensively literary theories and in these conversations Piglia bestows culture and scholarship.

It isn't a coincidence that the young writer's name, Emilio Renzi, is both Piglia's middle name and his mother's last name.
