= Régine Mahaux =

Belgian photographer (born 1967)

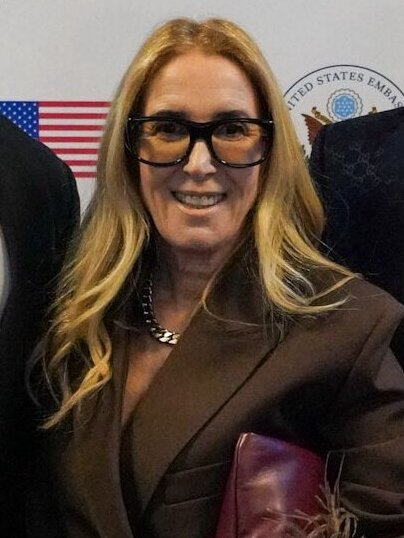
Mahaux in 2026

Régine Mahaux (born 1967) is a Belgian photographer known for her portraits of the Trump family.

== Biography ==
Mahaux was born in Liège, Belgium, and now lives in Paris. As a photographer, she first was active in publicity. She now specializes in celebrity pictures, with her work appearing in Vanity Fair and Time. Among her subjects are members of the Belgian royal family, Hollywood actors like Salma Hayek and Robert de Niro, and, since 2006, the Trump family.

== Notable works ==
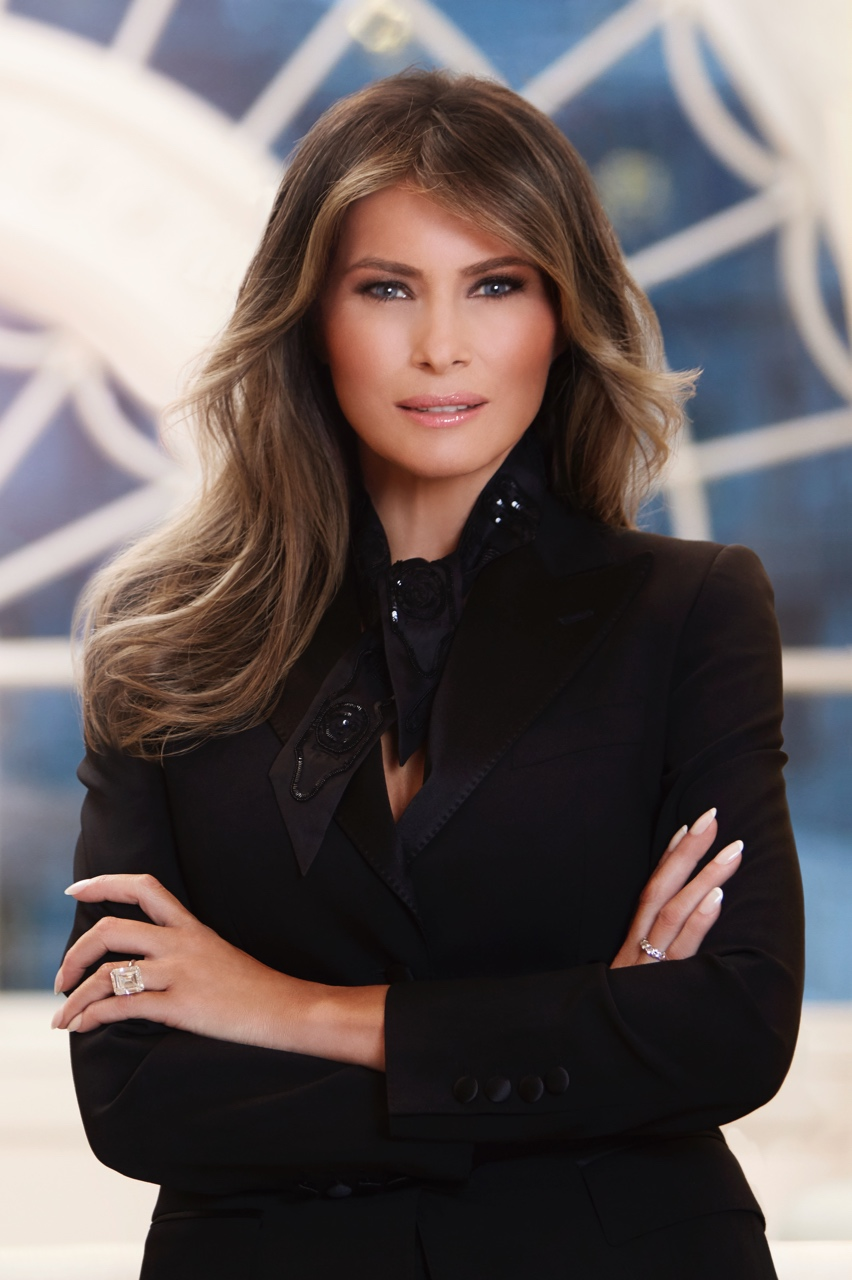
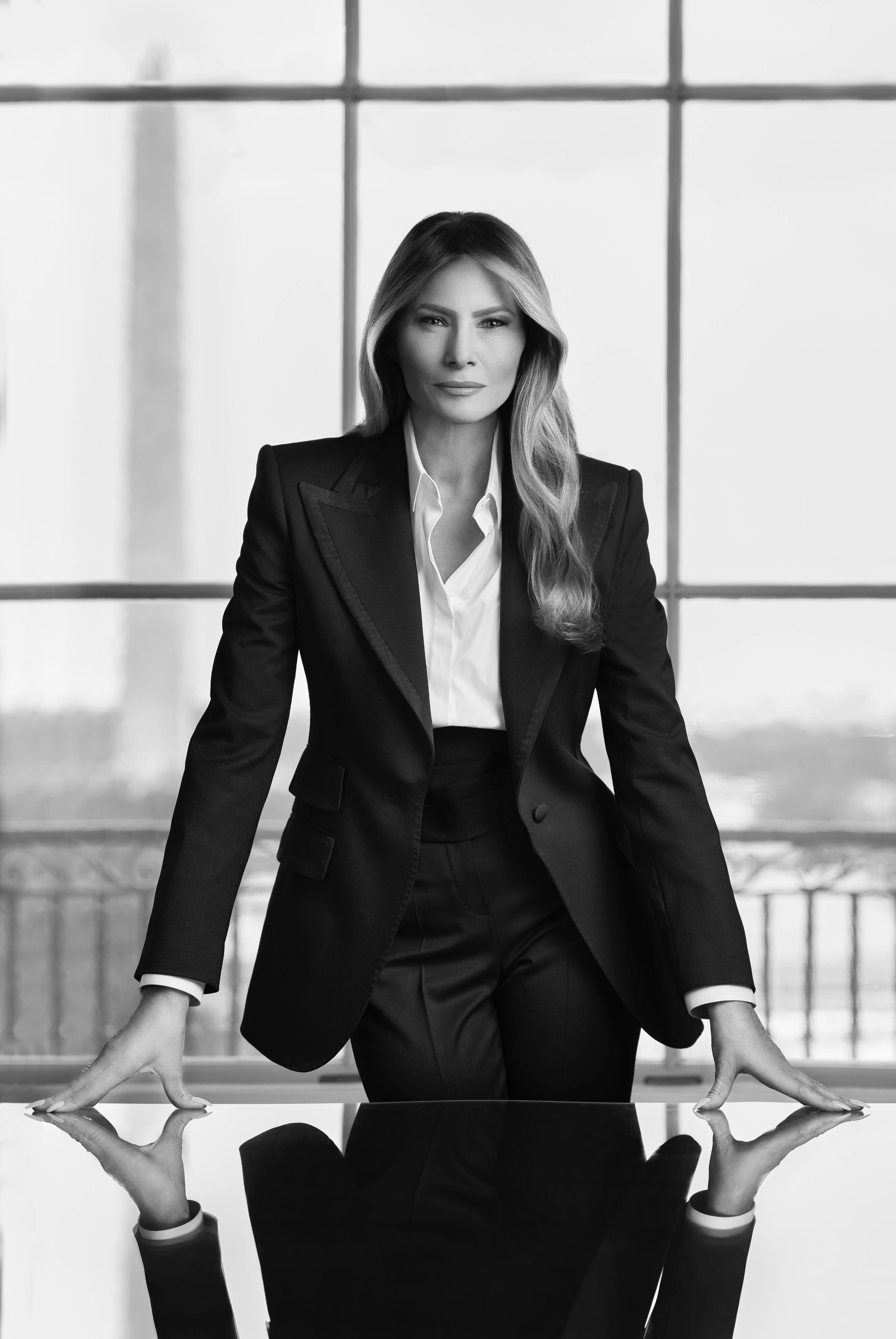
Melania Trump's official portraits; released in 2017 (left) and 2025 (right)

On 3 April 2017, the White House released Mahaux's official portrait of First Lady Melania Trump. Upon Donald Trump's return to the presidency in 2025, the White House released a second term official portrait of Melania Trump on 27 January 2025.
