= My Name Is Pauli Murray =

2021 American documentary film

- Theatrical release poster
- Directed by: Betsy West; Julie Cohen
- Written by: Talleah Bridges McMahon; Julie Cohen; Betsy West; Cinque Northern
- Produced by: Talleah Bridges McMahon
- Cinematography: Claudia Raschke
- Edited by: Cinque Northern
- Music by: Jongnic Bontemps
- Production companies: Participant; Storyville Films; Drexler Films
- Distributed by: Amazon Studios
- Release dates: January 31, 2021 (Sundance); September 17, 2021 (United States)
- Running time: 91 minutes
- Country: United States
- Language: English

My Name Is Pauli Murray is a 2021 American documentary film directed by Betsy West and Julie Cohen, written by West, Cohen, Talleah Bridges McMahon and Cinque Northern. It follows the life of lawyer and activist Pauli Murray.

The film had its world premiere at the Sundance Film Festival on January 31, 2021. A limited release followed on September 17, 2021, prior to digital streaming on Prime Video on October 1, 2021, by Amazon Studios.

== Synopsis ==
The film follows the life of lawyer and activist Pauli Murray who was instrumental in arguing the equal protection clause of the fourteenth amendment outlawed discrimination based on sex. Several scholars of Murray's work are featured in the film including Brittney Cooper and Rosalind Rosenberg. Rosenberg's research for the book Jane Crow: The Life of Pauli Murray is also highlighted. The film includes significant coverage of Murray's papers housed at the Schlesinger library. Murray's influence on Ruth Bader Ginsburg is covered in detail throughout the film.

== Depiction of Murray's gender identity ==
My Name Is Pauli Murray features a nuanced analysis of Murray's gender identity. The film makes extensive connections between Murray's gender identity and groundbreaking feminist legal arguments. Historian Rosalind Rosenberg explains in the film how a sense of "in-betweenness" contributed to the numerous innovative legal arguments presented by Murray with regards to race and gender.

== Release ==
The film had its world premiere at the 2021 Sundance Film Festival on January 31, 2021. Shortly after, Amazon Studios acquired distribution rights to the film. It also screened at AFI Docs in June 2021. It was released in a limited release on September 17, 2021, prior to digital streaming on Amazon Prime Video on October 1, 2021.

== Critical reception ==
Cohen has been quoted as noting Murray was an "unrecognized figure in so many areas" and an intent behind the creation of the film was to bring Murray's story to a wider audience. My Name Is Pauli Murray received positive reviews from film critics. It holds a 95% approval rating on review aggregator website Rotten Tomatoes, based on 20 reviews, with a weighted average of 7.80/10. The site's critics consensus reads: "My Name Is Pauli Murray educates and uplifts in equal measure while paying stirring tribute to a largely unsung -- yet hugely important -- individual."

== Accolades ==
It won the prestigious Peabody Award in 2022.
