= Best Bits (New Zealand TV series) =

- Presented by: Te Radar (series 1); Jesse Mulligan (series 2–3)
- Country of origin: New Zealand
- Original language: English
- No. of series: 3
- No. of episodes: 39

Production
- Running time: 30 minutes (incl. advertisements)
- Production company: The Down Low Concept

Original release
- Network: TV One
- Release: 19 July 2013 – 21 May 2015

Best Bits is a New Zealand comedy show, where a panel of comedians comment on video clips taken from television during the week prior. It is produced by The Down Low Concept, and hosted by comedian Te Radar in the first series and ex-Seven Sharp presenter and comedian Jesse Mulligan in the second and third series.

The first series premiered on TV One on 19 July 2013, and ended in October 2013 with "Best Bits of Best Bits", an episode where highlights from the past series were revisited. The second series premiered on 26 March 2014, and ended on 19 June 2014. The third series premiered on 26 February 2015, and ended on 21 May 2015.

== Series overview ==
Series	Host	No. of episodes	Broadcast	Air time
1	Te Radar	13	19 July 2013 – 11 October 2013	9pm on Fridays
2	Jesse Mulligan	13	26 March 2014 – 19 June 2014	9:35pm on Thursdays
3	Jesse Mulligan	13	26 February 2015 – 21 May 2015	9:30pm on Thursdays

== Format ==
The show is recorded in front of a live audience. Each week the host, along with a recurring panel of four comedians, share brief video clips taken from television programmes, commercials, and infomercials from both New Zealand and international broadcasters that were broadcast during the past week. The panelists then make observations and jokes (usually of a satirical nature) about what they have seen.

== Panelists ==
=== Recurring panelists ===
- Vaughan Smith
- Rhys Mathewson
- Heidi O'Loughlin
- Matt Heath
- Guy Montgomery
- Jackie van Beek
- Donna Brookbanks

=== Guest panelists ===
- Rose Matafeo
- Shavaughn Ruakere
- Alexis Dubus (as Marcel Lucont)
- Nick Gibb
- Sara Pascoe

== International adaptations ==
An Australian version of the format, Best Bits, aired from 29 March 2016 on the Seven Network.
