= Julie Cohen (documentarian) =

American filmmaker

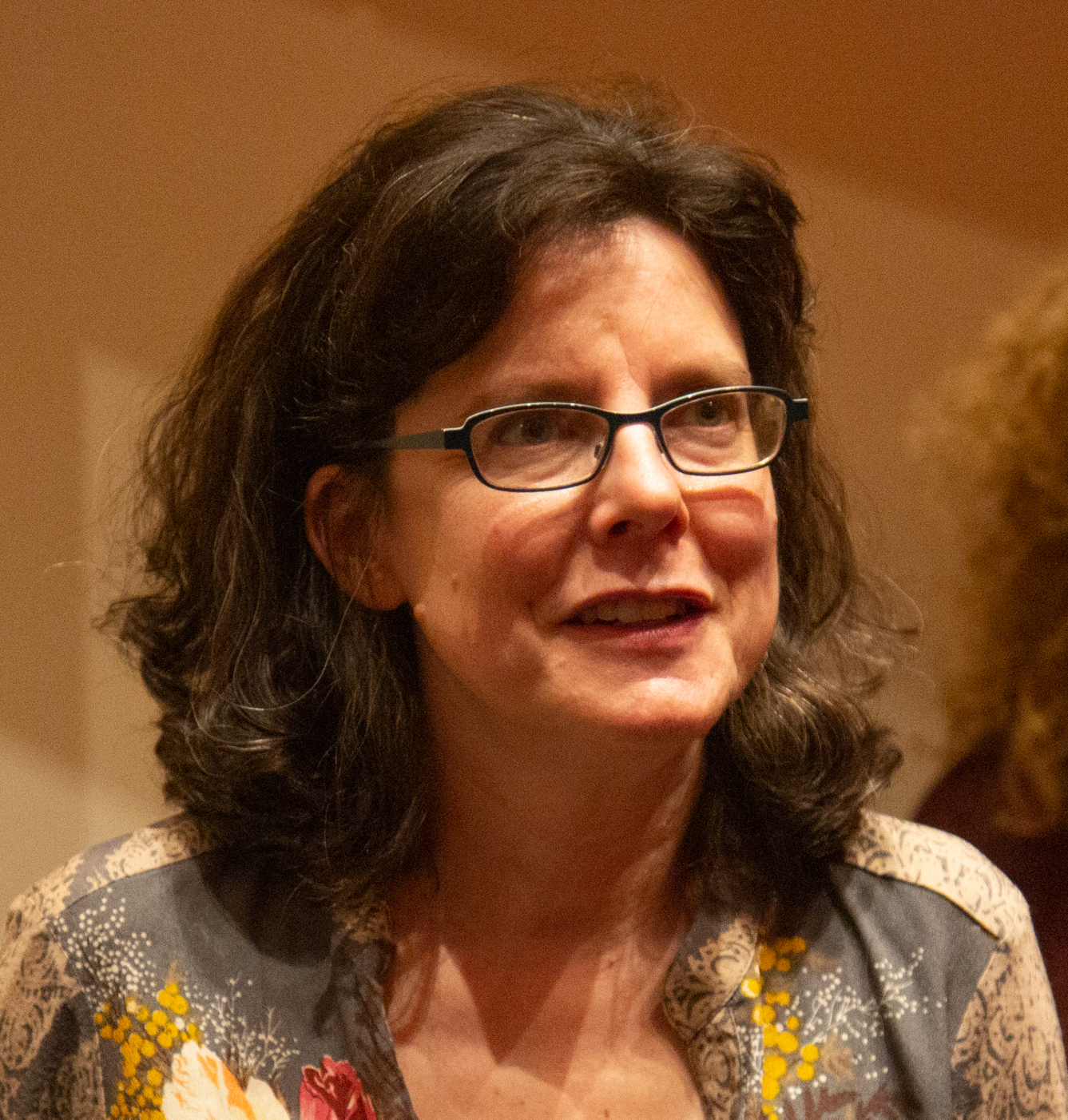
- Cohen in 2018
- Education: Colgate University (BA); Columbia University (MA); Yale University (MSL)
- Spouse: Paul Barrett

Julie Cohen is an American filmmaker. She co-directed the documentary films RBG (2018), My Name Is Pauli Murray (2021), Julia (2021), and Gabby Giffords Won't Back Down (2022) with Betsy West. RBG was nominated for Best Documentary Feature at the 91st Academy Awards. Earlier in her career, Cohen was a news producer at NBC News Studios and a producer at Court TV. She also directed the 2023 documentary Every Body.

== Early life and education ==
Cohen graduated from Colgate University in 1986. She got her Masters degree at Columbia University Graduate School of Journalism.

== Career ==
Cohen worked as a news producer at NBC News Studios where she worked on Dateline for nine years. She was a producer at Court TV, and worked at Columbia University as an adjunct faculty member and adviser to their documentary program. She co-directed RBG (2018), My Name Is Pauli Murray (2021), Julia (2021), and Gabby Giffords Won't Back Down (2022) with Betsy West. RBG premiered at the Sundance Film Festival and was nominated for an Oscar in 2018. Julia drew its throughline primarily from Bob Spitz’s biography of Julia Child, Dearie: The Remarkable Life of Julia Child. Variety said the film had a "a general air of cuteness." In 2026, Cohen co-directed the documentary short Top of the World with West, revolving around the restaurant Windows of the World.

She also directed the 2023 documentary Every Body about three people born intersex. The film discusses the US's transphobic history and discusses the treatment of transgender people by medical professionals and society at large. Variety said that Every Body "fosters an environment where the trio can share and compare their experiences, addressing topics rarely spoken of in public." Cohen had met one of the film's subjects, David Reimer, while she was working on Dateline in 1999. When she was invited to look through the Dateline archives for "jumping-off points for feature-length...documentaries" she decided to tell his story and the stories of other intersex activists.

== Honors and awards ==
Cohen is a three-time winner of the duPont-Columbia Awards. In 2019 she was awarded the Cinema for Peace Award for Women's Empowerment for the film RBG. She won the San Francisco Jewish Film Festival’s Freedom of Expression Award in 2024.

== Activism ==
Cohen previously served as a juror at Columbia University's duPont-Columbia Awards. She resigned in March 2025 after the university, facing a potential loss of about $400 million in funding, agreed to the Trump administration's demands regarding policies on protesters and race-related conflicts. After her resignation, three of the remaining eight jurors also resigned. Cohen is the organizer of a regular anti-Trump protest in Montclair, New Jersey.
