= Lindsay Utz =

American documentary film editor

- Born: Lindsay Ann Utz; Park Ridge, Illinois, U.S.
- Education: University of Arizona
- Occupations: Film editor; director
- Years active: 2004–present

Lindsay Utz is a two-time Emmy Award winning documentary film director, Academy Award-winning editor, and producer. She is best known for her work on American Factory, Billie Eilish: The World's a Little Blurry, and Prime Minister.

== Life and career ==
Lindsay was born in 1981 in Park Ridge, Illinois. She graduated from the University of Arizona in 2003 with a B.A. in Media Studies. From 2006 to 2009, she was Executive Producer at Good Magazine, where she ran the video department. She broke into feature-length documentary editing with 2011's Bully. Additional editing credits include Quest (2017), Miss Americana (2020), and Martha (2024), among others. She was supervising editor and producer on the Jennifer Lopez documentary, The Greatest Love Story Never Told (2024). In 2025, she co-directed Prime Minister, a documentary about former Prime Minister of New Zealand Jacinda Ardern, which won the World Documentary Audience Award at the 2025 Sundance Film Festival as well as Emmys for Outstanding Politics and Government Documentary and Best Documentary at the 2026 Emmy Awards. In 2025, she launched documentary production company Win Win Pictures with music supervisor and producer Margaret Yen. She is represented by United Talent Agency.

Lindsay is a member of American Cinema Editors and the Documentary Branch of the Academy of Motion Picture Arts and Sciences.

== Filmography ==
Year	Title	Credited as		Note
Year	Title	Editor	Director	Note
2009	Good: Internet Censorship	No	Yes	Documentary; co-director
2011	Bully	Yes	No	Documentary
2012	Op-Docs	Yes	No	1 Episode
2012	Buoy	Yes	No	Feature film
2014	In Country	Yes	No	Documentary
2015–2016	Frontline	Yes	No	2 Episodes
2017	Quest	Yes	No	Documentary
2019	American Factory	Yes	No	Documentary; also, camera
2019	Contaminated Memories	Yes	No	Short film
2020	Miss Americana	Yes	No	Documentary
2021	Since You Arrived, My Heart Stopped Belonging to Me	Yes	No	Documentary; consulting editor
2021	Billie Eilish: The World's a Little Blurry	Yes	No	Documentary
2022	Civil: Ben Crump	Yes	No	Documentary
2024	Martha	Yes	No	Documentary
2025	Prime Minister	No	Yes	Documentary; co-director

== Awards and nominations ==
Year	Award	Category	Work	Result	Ref.
2018	Cinema Eye Honors	Outstanding Achievement in Editing	Quest	Won	
2019	International Documentary Association	Best Editing	American Factory	Nominated	
2019	Critics' Choice Documentary Awards	Best Editing	American Factory	Nominated	
2020	Cinema Eye Honors	Outstanding Achievement in Editing	American Factory	Nominated	
2020	American Cinema Editors	Best Edited Documentary – Feature	American Factory	Nominated	
2020	Primetime Emmy Awards	Outstanding Picture Editing for a Nonfiction Program	American Factory	Nominated	
2022	American Cinema Editors	Best Edited Documentary - Non-Theatrical	Billie Eilish: The World's a Little Blurry	Nominated	
2025	World Documentary Audience Award	World Cinema Documentary, Sundance Film Festival	Prime Minister	Won	
2026	News & Documentary Emmy Awards	Outstanding Politics and Government Documentary	Prime Minister	Won	
2026	News & Documentary Emmy Awards	Best Documentary	Prime Minister	Won	
