= Betsy West =

American producer, filmmaker and video journalist

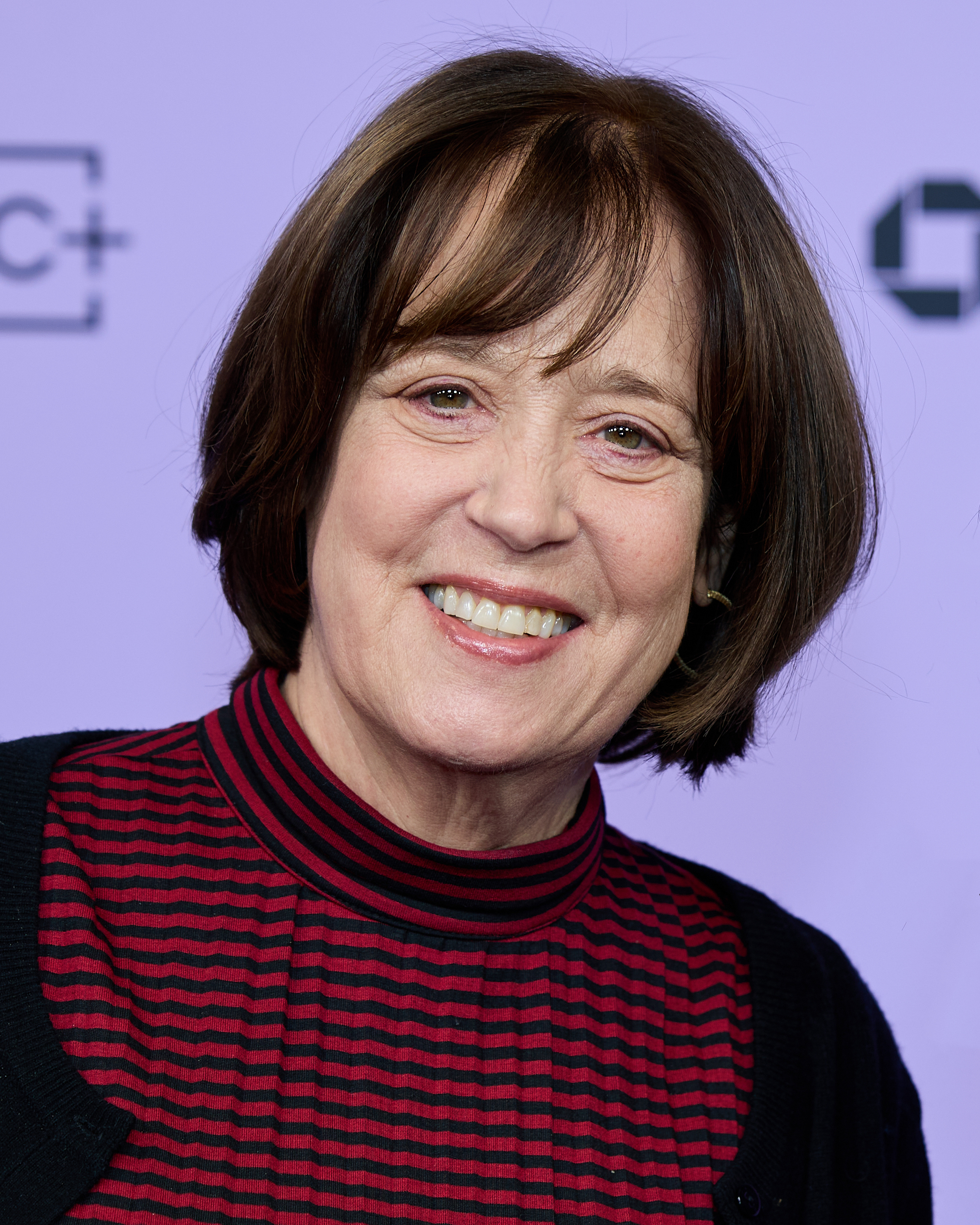
- West at the 2024 Sundance Film Festival
- Education: Brown University (BA); Syracuse University (MA)
- Spouse: Oren Jacoby

Betsy West is an American producer, filmmaker, and video journalist. With Julie Cohen, she has directed four biographical documentary films focusing on American women: RBG (2018), My Name is Pauli Murray (2021), Julia (2021) and Gabby Giffords Won't Back Down (2022). She received the Cinema for Peace Award for Women's Empowerment for her film RBG. She is the Fred W. Friendly Professor of Professional Practice in Media Society Emeritus, at the Columbia University Graduate School of Journalism.

== Early life ==
West attended the Wheeler School in Providence, Rhode Island. She matriculated at Brown University, graduating in 1973. West earned a Master's in Communications from the S. I. Newhouse School of Public Communications at Syracuse University in 1974.

She is married to fellow documentary filmmaker Oren Jacoby.
