= Nabbed (TV series) =

- Genre: Observational Documentary Television Series
- Country of origin: New Zealand
- Original language: English
- No. of seasons: 1
- No. of episodes: 9

Production
- Running time: 22 minutes (without adverts)

Original release
- Network: TV2
- Release: 11 February – 8 April 2014

Nabbed is a New Zealand reality television show, produced with the assistance of the New Zealand Police Traffic Division for Television New Zealand's TV2. The show profiles and follows the work of traffic police officers in their patrols and other police duties.

A single series of nine episodes ran between 11 February 2014 and 8 April 2014.

== See also ==
- Motorway Patrol
- Ten 7 Aotearoa
