= Jesse Mulligan =

New Zealand television and radio broadcaster

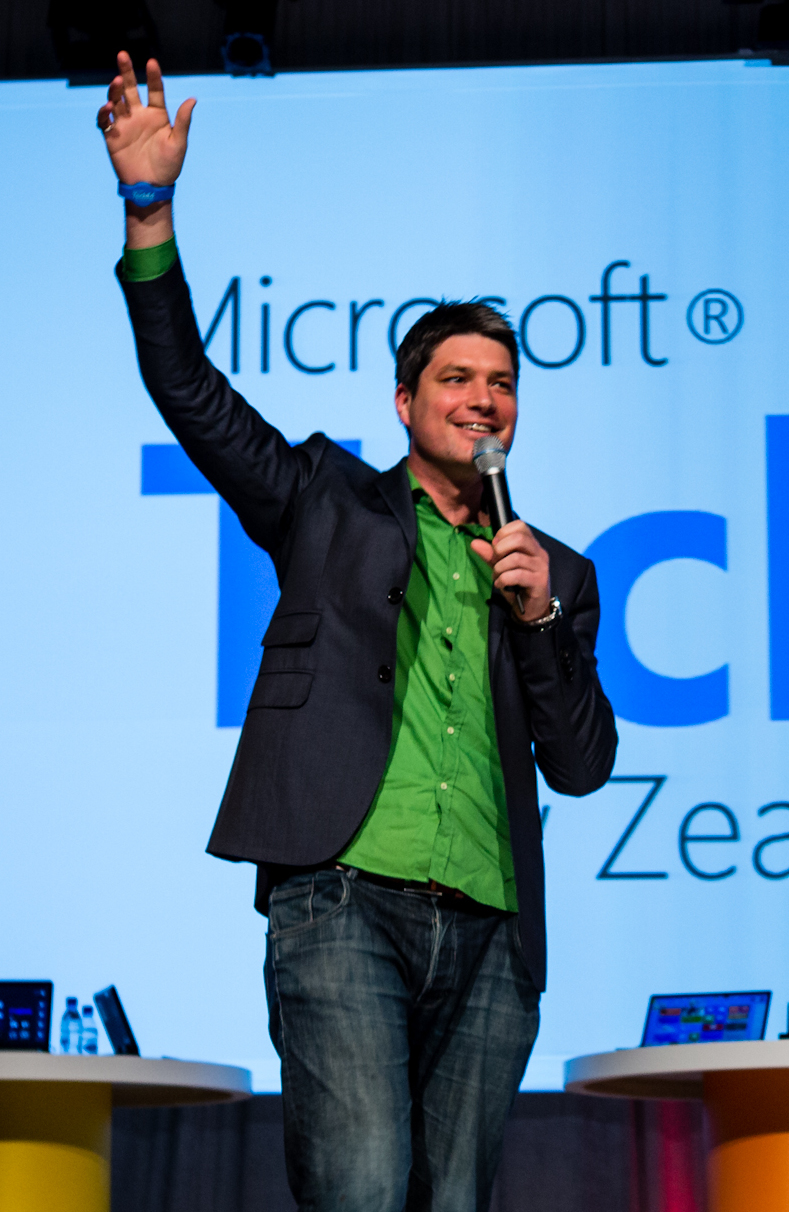
- Jesse Mulligan in 2012
- Presenting career
- Show: The Project
- Station: Three
- Country: New Zealand
- Previous shows: Best Bits; Seven Sharp; 7 Days

Jesse Robert Turi Mulligan is a New Zealand television and radio broadcaster and writer. From 2015 he has hosted Afternoons on RNZ National. He was a co-host for The Project on Three from 2017 to 2023. He is also the Dining out editor at the Viva lifestyle magazine published by NZME.

== Career ==
While studying for a law degree from Waikato University, Mulligan hosted radio and television programmes broadcast by the Waikato Student Union. Thereafter he worked as a commercial radio host in Wellington and Auckland, as a comedian, and in public relations and corporate communications.

Mulligan was a writer and then regular panellist on Three's comedy gameshow 7 Days. In 2013, he started as one of the three hosts on TVNZ 1's new current affairs show, Seven Sharp. He left the show on 17 April 2014, after his co-hosts Ali Mau and Greg Boyed left at the end of 2013 and were replaced by Toni Street and Mike Hosking, as part of refreshing the show. In 2014 and 2015, he hosted comedy show Best Bits.

He succeeded Simon Mercep as the host of Afternoons on RNZ National in July 2015. A weekly feature of Afternoons during Mulligan's tenure has been Critter of the Week with Forest & Bird chief executive and former Department of Conservation threatened species ambassador Nicola Toki.

In 2017, Mulligan started co-hosting Three's new current affairs show, The Project, and continued in that role until the show was cancelled at the end of 2023.

As of 2024, he is Dining Out editor at Viva magazine, and was previously a food writer for Metro magazine.

== Personal life ==
Mulligan is the son of Nick Mulligan, who was the Values Party candidate in Hamilton East at the 1975 general election. Jesse Mulligan is married to psychologist Victoria Dawson-Wheeler and has four children.

== See also ==
- List of New Zealand television personalities
