= Television in New Zealand =

Television in New Zealand was introduced in 1960 as a state-run service. The broadcasting sector was deregulated in 1989, when the Government allowed competition to the state-owned TVNZ (Television New Zealand). There are currently three forms of broadcast television: a terrestrial (DVB-T) service provided by Freeview; as well as satellite (DVB-S) and internet streaming (IPTV) services provided nationwide by both Freeview and Sky.

The first nationwide digital television service was launched in December 1998 by Sky, who had a monopoly on digital satellite television until the launch of Freeview's nationwide digital satellite service in May 2007. The Freeview digital terrestrial service launched on 14 April 2008. A pay digital terrestrial service was launched in 2012 by Igloo and closed in 2017; this was a joint venture between Sky and TVNZ and provided Freeview UHF aerial channels along with eleven Sky channels. In July 2016, Sky announced that Igloo will be discontinued although Freeview channels will still be available. Up until 2023, Vodafone (now One NZ) operated an IPTV television service, with free-to-air channels and wholesale content from Sky.

The digital changeover in New Zealand began on 30 September 2012, when Hawke's Bay and the West Coast (including parts of Tasman) switched off analogue television transmission. The rest of the South Island switched off analogue television transmission on 28 April 2013, followed by the lower North Island on 29 September 2013. The upper North Island (including the Waikato, Auckland, Bay of Plenty and Northland) was the last region to cease analogue transmissions on 1 December 2013.

The major free-to-air television operators are currently TVNZ (TVNZ 1, TVNZ 2, and TVNZ Duke) and Sky Network Television (Bravo, Eden, HGTV, Rush, Sky Open and Three). Sky remains the dominant pay-TV operator, now operating on satellite and IPTV.

== History ==
The first television experiences were conducted in the late 1920s by Professor Robert Jack, Professor of Physics at the University of Otago. Television research was halted in 1930 due to lack of funds, but he continued to do his successful radio experiments. In 1939, arrangements were held for a television experiment at the New Zealand Centennial Exhibition in Rongotai, which was to be held the following year, and would have tests from a British company. However, on 1 September, World War II broke out and British technicians were forbidden from leaving the UK.

It was not until 1949 that an inter-departmental committee was set up to study the introduction of a television service in the country. The committee went abroad to study developments in television, particularly in Australia when the government there provided tenders for the construction of what would become ABN, ABC's Sydney station. They set up a deal with Amalgamated Wireless Australia to supply NZ£10,000 worth of equipment for the first experiment, which arrived to Wellington in February 1951, at NZBS's Waring Street studios. The first broadcast there was conducted on 7 March with an entertainment show supervised by Bernard Beeby. In the rehearsals leading up to the event, early reactions came from the television camera pointing at traffic, a newsboy and shop window displays. There was also a special demonstration for doctors claiming that television would change practical demonstration of surgery by taking the camera to a medical school in Dunedin, but this was not achieved. The first full experiment had an hour-long programme featuring an episode of the film series The Wooden Horse, performances from musicians, a cigarette commercial, a Māori stick game played by the Ngāti Pōneke club, game show The Quiz Kids, a boxing demonstration and other features. Over 2,500 locals got their tickets to take part in the television demonstration; after which, the equipment was sent to Auckland where it was tested at the 1YA Shortland Street facilities.

Universities and commercial interests were also setting up their own services. Bernie Withers of the Canterbury University College had also set up an experimental station in 1951, where, after his students tested vacuum tube technology, the team had assembled a closed-circuit broadcast by the end of the year. In 1952, the station, by then using the ZL3XT call sign, was broadcasting over a radius of a few miles in central Christchurch and had also received local and international equipment donations. Still in Christchurch, the New Zealand Radio Traders' Federation held its annual conference there with ZL3XT's experiments giving a notion of the arrival of television; while in Auckland, the local radio traders had teamed up with the Seddon Memorial Technical College to set up a two-year night school course for television technicians, led by Ron Waddell.

In late 1953, Ted Grant, who worked at Pye's Akrad factory in Waihi, returned to New Zealand with the assistance of the British parent company to provide NZ£75,000 worth of equipment for a television test at the Royal Wellington Show scheduled for January 1954, coinciding with the visit of Queen Elizabeth II and the Duke of Edinburgh to New Zealand. This was the first major attempt by a commercial enterprise to push for the introduction of television, as the company's sales of radios had fallen in the post-war years, causing it to find a new source of revenue. An estimated 100,000 people watched the test broadcast at the Royal Show in Wellington which had the participation of Prime Minister Sidney Holland (consequently becoming the first politician to appear on screen); later the equipment went to Auckland for the Easter Show in April, without the British technicians, this time leaving local technicians alone. This was overseen by Ron Waddell and, during the entire fortnight of the event, 175,000 people watched the television demonstrations, which included a television version of Selwyn Toogood's radio game show It's in the Bag. When the experiments ended, the government did not want a regular television service for the time being.

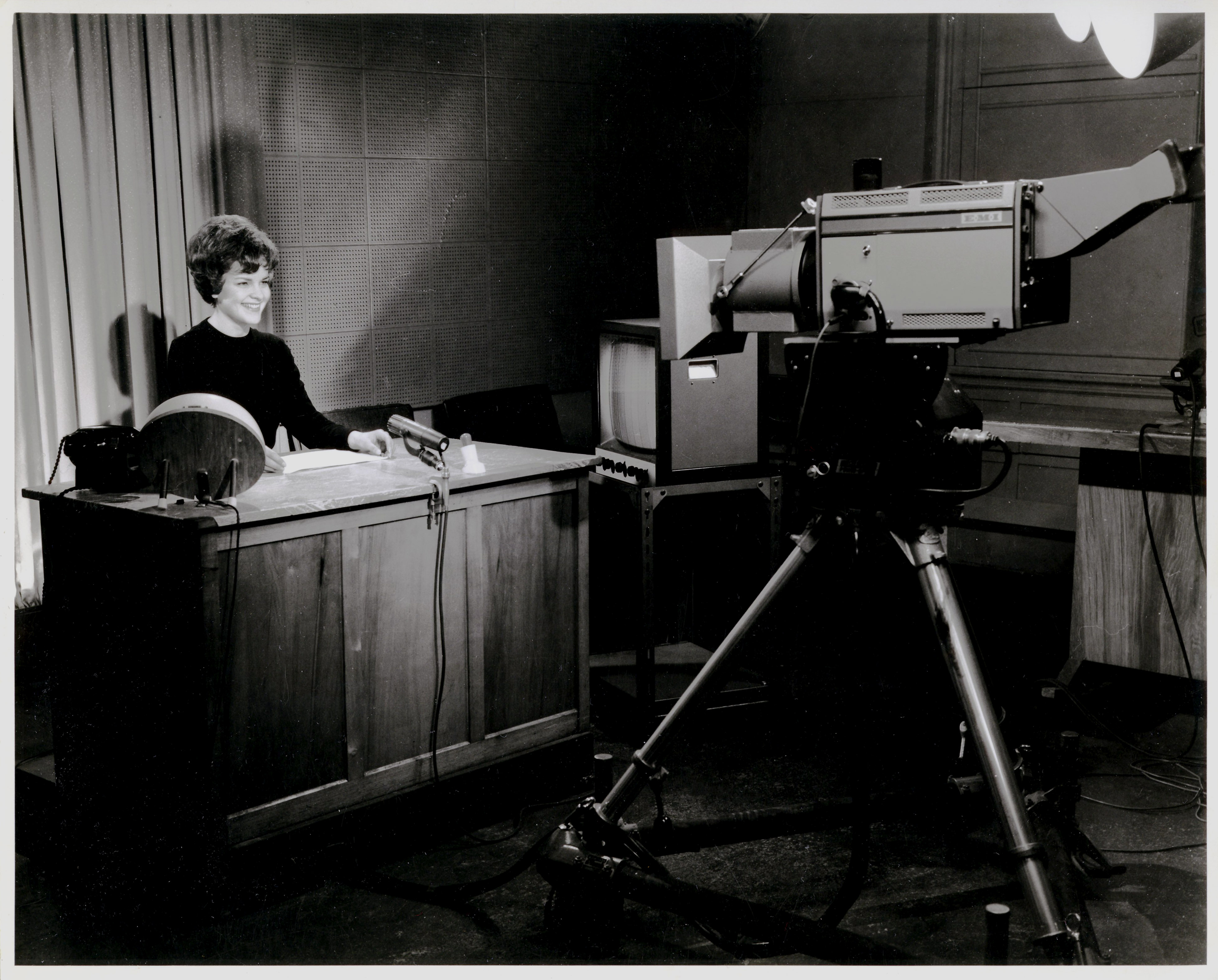
New Zealand Broadcasting Corporation (NZBC) filming in one of its studios, c. 1960s.

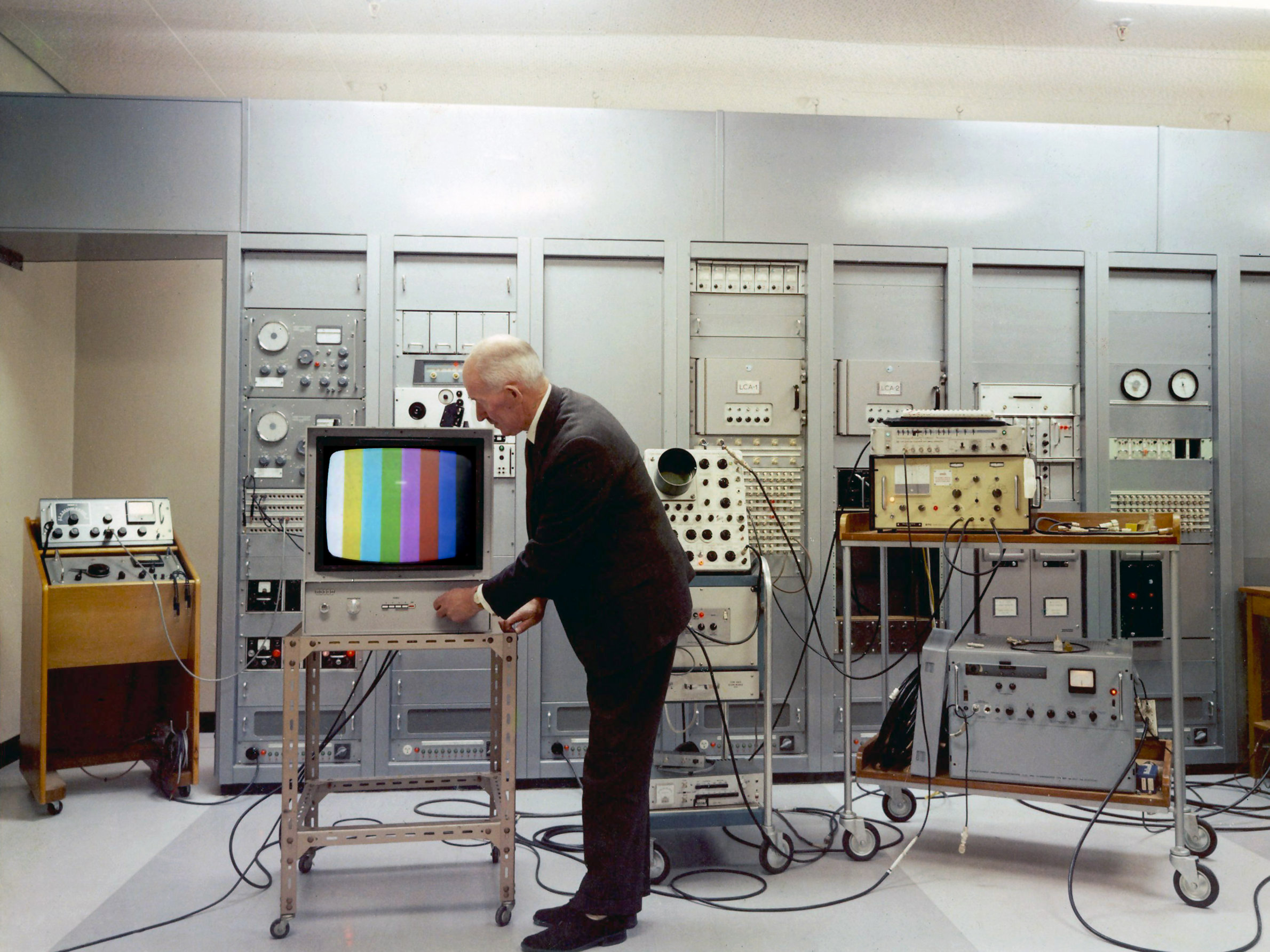
A colour television test at the Mount Kaukau transmitting station in February 1970. Colour television was formally introduced to New Zealand in 1973–1975.

Full-time television broadcasting was first introduced in New Zealand in 1960 and transmitted from the NZBC's existing 1YA radio broadcasting facility at 74 Shortland Street in Auckland, now home to the University of Auckland's Gus Fisher Gallery. The annual television licence fee was £NZ4 ($8). Prime Minister Walter Nash had made a surprise announcement (a surprise both to the NZBS and to other members of the Labour government) in London in November 1959 that New Zealand would have television within twelve months; the system was to be state-owned but to carry commercials, and would be introduced in stages in the four main centres. The first non-experimental programme was transmitted on Wednesday 1 June 1960.

New Zealand, like Australia and most of western Europe, adopted the 625-line standard for television. In contrast, United Kingdom used the 405-line standard exclusively until 1964.

Initially, programming was done on a regional basis, with different services broadcasting from the main cities, AKTV2 in Auckland, being the first on 1 June 1960, followed in 1961 by CHTV3 in Christchurch on 1 June and WNTV1 in Wellington on 1 July, and then DNTV2 in Dunedin on 31 July 1962. There was no network between the stations at the time; tapes of shows were transferred between each station for broadcast, usually starting in Auckland and working their way south to Dunedin. Today, however, programming and scheduling is done in Auckland where all the major networks are now headquartered.

National won the 1960 election, and the new Minister of Broadcasting, Arthur Kinsella in the new National government rewrote the Broadcasting Act of 1936, and set up the state-owned New Zealand Broadcasting Corporation (NZBC) in 1962 to control public radio and television (although the party had been polarised between having a state-owned, private enterprise or mixed system).

The first broadcast relay stations were commissioned in 1963, extending television coverage to Hamilton, Tauranga and Palmerston North. Coverage was further expanded to Napier-Hastings and Invercargill in 1964, Timaru in 1965, and Whangārei and New Plymouth in 1966. In addition, a number of televiewers' societies were established to set up and operate their own translators.

Advertising was introduced to Aucklanders on 4 April 1961, and facilitated increasing transmission hours to twenty-eight per week. By 1962 there were 65,000 licences, by 1963 there were 80,000 licences and an estimated audience of 300,000 or one-eighth of the population, and by 1966 there were half a million licences. Television sets were added to the CPI basket in 1966. At the time, a 23-inch black-and-white 'consolette' television set cost on average £131 ($262), equivalent to $6,488 in 2024.

Initially, the hours of transmission were from 5pm until close at about 10pm, later extending, in 1966, to 2pm opening. A test pattern was transmitted from 9am to allow for adjustment of TV sets in homes by technicians.

The four stations were networked in 1969. The network was mostly complete in time for the Apollo 11 mission in July 1969, with gaps filled by strategically-placed outside broadcasting vans to allow the film of the landing to be broadcast live across the country. The NZBC's first live network news bulletin was read by Dougal Stevenson on 3 November 1969. The Warkworth satellite station opened in 1971, providing the first real-time television link between New Zealand and the rest of the world.

The NZBC had asked the Government for the approval of a second TV channel as early as 1964, but this was rejected as the Government considered increasing coverage of the existing TV service to be of greater priority. By 1971, however, two proposals for a second channel were under consideration: that of the NZBC for a non-commercial service; and a separate commercial channel to be operated by an Independent Television Corporation, headed by Gordon Dryden.

Although the Broadcasting Authority had favoured the Independent Television Corporation bid, the incoming Labour government favoured the NZBC's application and awarded it the licence without any formal hearings beforehand. (Eventually, Independent Television was awarded NZ$50,000 in compensation.)

On Wednesday 31 October 1973, colour television using the Phase Alternating Line (PAL) system was introduced, in readiness for the 1974 British Commonwealth Games, which were to be held in Christchurch in January and February 1974. In February 1975, black-and-white televisions sets cost on average $350 (equivalent to $4,190 in 2024) while colour television sets cost on average $840 (equivalent to $10,070 in 2024).

=== Reorganisation ===
The NZBC was dissolved on 1 April 1975, and the existing NZBC television service became Television One. The second channel, TV2 (later renamed South Pacific Television in 1976) launched on 30 June 1975.

In 1977, the Broadcasting Corporation of New Zealand (BCNZ) was established, and in 1980, TV One and South Pacific (known once again as TV2) were merged into a single organisation, TVNZ (Television New Zealand).

=== Commercialisation ===
In 1988, following major economic reforms to the state sector, the BCNZ was dissolved. TVNZ and Radio New Zealand (RNZ) became separate "State-Owned Enterprises" (SOEs) which would have to compete commercially and return dividends to the Crown.

Rather than continuing to be used to directly fund TVNZ and RNZ, the licence fee, now called the broadcasting fee, was to be used for local content production and the state funding for non-commercial broadcasting in radio and television on a contestable basis. As part of wide-ranging reforms in the broadcasting sector, the Labour government of David Lange established the Broadcasting Commission, which became known as and finally called NZ On Air.

Broadcasting in New Zealand was deregulated in 1989. Restrictions on television advertising were also revised in 1989, so that the TVNZ channels could show advertisements anytime except Good Friday, Easter Sunday and Christmas Day, and between 6am and noon on Sunday and Anzac Day. In November 1989, TV3, now known as Three became the first privately owned TV station in the country, finally ending the state monopoly. Restrictions on foreign ownership were also removed, and TV3 was subsequently sold to Canada's CanWest. Sky TV, in which TVNZ originally had a small stake, began broadcasting New Zealand's first pay TV service on three UHF channels in May 1990.

Although TVNZ had to compete with its commercial rivals through the 1990s, it maintained a dominant market position and paid a significant amount of its profits to the Crown in dividends. By 1998–1999, the National Party–led coalition was moving to privatise TVNZ and announced that the broadcasting fee would be discontinued. Since the 1970s, the licence fee had been capped at NZ$100 a year, and was not allowed to increase with inflation. In real terms, this meant that public funding of broadcasting in New Zealand was greatly reduced by the time of the broadcasting fee's abolition.

However, the 1999 election saw a Labour-led coalition gain office. Over its next two terms, attempts were made to reintroduce public service functions to the sector. In 2003, TVNZ was restructured as a Crown-Owned Company with a public service Charter. The Charter, abolished by the Key National government in 2008, received a small amount of government subsidy, but TVNZ remains predominantly dependent on commercial revenue and is obliged to continue paying dividends to the Crown.

It can apply to NZ On Air (funded directly from the Government since 2000) for support in local content initiatives, such as drama and comedy, and funding of programming for minority groups such as gay, Christian and rural New Zealanders. The funding of Māori programming has since passed to Te Māngai Pāho, the Māori broadcasting commission.

In 2004, the Māori Television Service was established to promote Māori language and culture. MTS is funded partly through direct government funding and partly through commercial advertising, but is eligible for contestable programming funds from Te Mangai Paho.

In 2006, the Government announced the introduction of two new non-commercial digital television services operated by TVNZ, offering drama, arts, documentary and children's programming called TVNZ 6 and TVNZ 7. However, after a change of government, funding for the two channels was not renewed. In 2011, the children's channel, TVNZ 6, was replaced by the commercial youth channel TVNZ U, leaving New Zealand with no free to air children's television. TVNZ Kidzone 24 was subsequently established, but was only available behind a Sky TV pay wall before it ceased broadcasting in 2016. TVNZ 7 ceased broadcasting on 30 June 2012, with a number of its programs being picked up by other channels. In response, public broadcasting advocates announced plans to form a new lobby group, now known as Better Public Media.

In 2020, Broadcasting Minister Kris Faafoi issued proposals to re-merge TVNZ and RNZ into a unified public media organisation, Aotearoa New Zealand Public Media, amidst rapidly changing conditions in the media market. After Faafoi announced his retirement from politics, Willie Jackson was appointed as his successor to continue the merger process. In February 2023, Prime Minister Chris Hipkins scrapped plans to merge the two public broadcasters as part of a reorientation of government priorities towards living costs.

== Freeview ==
Freeview is a non-profit organisation providing free-to-air digital television and digital radio to New Zealand. The Freeview service is available via satellite throughout New Zealand. Freeview's terrestrial service is a high definition digital terrestrial television service available to 75 percent of the country's population, using DVB-S and DVB-T standards on government provided spectrum.

Analogue switchoff in New Zealand was completed on 1 December 2013. A major benefit of digital television is the ability to overcome the poor reception caused by New Zealand's rugged topography. Digital TV offers more channels, better pictures and sound quality and new services such as on-screen programme guides.

It was estimated that on 31 December 2008, 198,938 Freeview certified set-top boxes and IDTVs had been sold since the platform's launch (146,416 Satellite, 52,522 UHF). It is estimated that Freeview is in 12.6% of New Zealand homes (roughly 420,000 people). This makes it New Zealand's third largest television platform, and New Zealand's second largest digital platform. Freeview-certified set-top boxes and PVRs are available at most major New Zealand retailers. Cheaper, uncertified equipment can also be used.

== Regional channels ==
New Zealand's deregulated broadcasting environment has led to many regional stations (either non-commercial public service or privately owned) that broadcast only in one region or city. These stations mainly broadcast free to air on UHF frequencies, although some are carried on subscription TV. Content ranges from local news, access broadcasts, satellite sourced news, tourist information and Christian programming to music videos. Over a dozen regional television stations in New Zealand are grouped by the Regional Broadcasters Association.

== Free-to-air satellite channels ==
Many digital channels are broadcast into New Zealand via satellite. These include Freeview, Sky, and many Australian and other channels. Most can be received using a standard blind-scan capable set-top box in addition to the standard 60 cm satellite dish that is fitted to many houses.

== Pay television channels ==
New Zealand has a number of television channels that are, or have been, only available on pay television networks.

- Sky: In 1990, Sky Network Television (then, and again now, unrelated to its UK namesake) launched three pay-TV channels offering movies, sport and news on UHF; these over time expanded to five. In 1998 it launched a multichannel digital satellite TV service.

== Streaming ==
In 2007, streaming television entered the New Zealand market with the launch of TVNZ OnDemand.

The first paid New Zealand television streaming service, Lightbox was launched in 2014. About one quarter of the population now use streaming as a form of television. Local paid service providers include:

- Neon
- Sky Sport Now

Free providers include:

- Māori+
- ThreeNow
- TVNZ+

== See also ==
- List of free-to-air TV channels in New Zealand
- List of television production companies of New Zealand
- List of New Zealand television series
- List of New Zealand television personalities
