= Test Card F =

Test card used by BBC television for decades

Off-air screen capture of BBC Test Card F, as seen on BBC1 between 17 February 1991 and 4 October 1997. (September 1993 Variant Picture)

Test Card F is a test card that was created by the BBC and used on television in the United Kingdom and in countries elsewhere in the world for more than four decades. Like other test cards, it was usually shown while no programmes were being broadcast. It was the first to be transmitted in colour in the UK and the first to feature a person, and has become an iconic British image regularly subject to parody.

The central image on the card shows Carole Hersee playing noughts and crosses with a clown doll, Bubbles the Clown, surrounded by various greyscales and colour test signals used to assess the quality of the transmitted picture. It was first broadcast on 2 July 1967 (the day after the first colour pictures appeared to the public on television) on BBC2.

The card was developed by BBC engineer George Hersee (1924–2001)—Carole's father. It was frequently broadcast during daytime downtime on BBC Television until 29 April 1983, when it was replaced with broadcasts of Ceefax pages. It continued to be seen for around 7.5 minutes each day before the start of Ceefax broadcasts but it would also be shown on days when the Ceefax generator was not working. It was further phased out from BBC1 in November 1997 when the station began to air 24 hours a day, followed by BBC2 in January 1999 when its overnight downtime was replaced entirely by Pages from Ceefax. After then it was only seen during engineering work, and was last seen in this role in 2011. The card was also seen on ITV in the 1970s, occasionally used in conjunction with Test Card G.

In the digital age, Test Card F and its variants are very infrequently broadcast, as downtime hours in schedules have largely been discontinued. Several variations of TCF have been screened, among them Test Card J (digitally enhanced), Test Card W (widescreen) and its high definition variant, which is sometimes erroneously referred to as Test Card X.

Up until the UK's digital television transition in 2010–2012, the test card made an appearance during the annual RBS (rebroadcast standby) Test Transmissions and, until 2013, during the BBC HD preview loop, which used Test Card W.

== Technical information ==
Virtually all the designs and patterns on the card have some significance. Along the top (see above) are 95% saturation colour bars in descending order of luminance—white, yellow, cyan, green, magenta, red, blue and black. There are triangles on each of the four sides of the card to check for correct overscanning of the picture. Standard greyscale and frequency response (1.5, 2.5, 3.5, 4, 4.5 and 5.25 MHz) tests are found on the left and right respectively of the central picture. On the updated version known as Test Card J (including widescreen and HD versions), the X on the noughts-and-crosses board is an indicator for aligning the centre of the screen.

The blocks of colour on the sides would cause the picture to tear horizontally if the sync circuits were not adjusted properly. The closely spaced lines in various parts of the screen allowed focus to be checked from centre to edge; mistuning would also blur the lines. All parts of the greyscale would not be distinct if contrast and brightness (both internal preset settings and user adjustments) were not set correctly. The black bar on a white background revealed ringing and signal reflections. The castellations along the top and bottom also revealed possible setup problems.

In the centre image, a child was depicted so that wrong skin colour would be obvious and not subject to changing make-up fashions. The juxtaposed garish colours of the clown were such that a common transmission error called chrominance/luminance delay inequality would make the clown's yellow buttons turn white. Use of centre images in test cards were however not a new idea; RTF and ORTF in France used the Marly Horses as the central motif of its monochrome 819-line test card which was used on TF1 between 1953 and 1983, and the first French colour test card featuring a centre image of colourful roses was used on France 2 from 1967 until sometime around the mid-1970s. SVT in Sweden was also later inspired by Test Card F to develop its own colour test card, based on its earlier monochrome test cards, with a girl holding a doll in the centre image.

Modern circuitry using large-scale integration is much less susceptible to most of these problems. Some of them are also associated with cathode-ray tubes; modern screens use liquid crystal displays (LCDs) that are not scanned at high speed. The test card was a vital tool in its day, but has become far less important.

The name of the broadcasting channel usually appeared in the space underneath the letter F—a sans-serif F denoting an original optical version of the test card.

Originally, Test Card F was a photographic slide made up of two transparencies in perfect registration—one containing the colour information (chrominance) and the other the monochrome background (luminance). The card was converted to electronic form in 1984 when electronic storage became possible.

== Audio accompaniment ==
A sound of some kind is usually transmitted in the background. It is either music, usually a composition commissioned by the station itself or "royalty-free" stock music, or a steady tone. Composers whose music has been used include Roger Roger, Johnny Pearson, Neil Richardson, Frank Chacksfield, Syd Dale, John Cameron, Brian Bennett, Keith Mansfield, and Alan Hawkshaw.

In recent years, the Test Card is only shown during engineering tests on the BBC and is accompanied by a steady tone of various pitches accompanied by a female talking clock. Test Card music had ceased to be frequently heard with the test card by the end of the 1980s, although it continued to be played over Pages from Ceefax until the termination of that service on 22 October 2012.

== Bubbles the Clown ==
Original transparency of the central image created for Test Card F. (1966 Variant)

Along with his Test Card F co-star Carole Hersee, Bubbles has appeared for an estimated total of 70,000 hours on television, equivalent to nearly eight whole years. Carole still owns Bubbles.

=== Colour ===
Bubbles's original body colour was blue and white, but the BBC engineers decided that green was also needed within the scene as the other two television primary colours, red and blue, were already shown. A green wrap was made to cover his body and this can be seen in Test Card J and Test Card W, along with more of his body shown in the photograph — revealing the fact that he is actually holding a piece of chalk, which was not previously visible.

However, the shade of green material chosen was too subtle for the engineers' liking and so Bubbles' body colour in Test Card F was retouched (this can be seen from the edges of his image) to make it more saturated and also to give it a higher luminance value on screen.

== Overseas usage ==
Test Card F was also used in approximately 30 countries outside the UK. Notable overseas users included:

- Bahrain Radio and Television Corporation in Bahrain
- DR in Denmark (Replaced along with Philips PM5552 by the Philips circle pattern in 1970)
- NRK in Norway, briefly in the 1970s
- SVT in Sweden, briefly in the 1970s
- STW-9 in Perth, Australia
- TCN-9 and TEN-10 in Sydney, Australia
- NBN-3 in Newcastle, Australia
- Radio Television Singapore (RTS)/Singapore Broadcasting Corporation (SBC), albeit with the original centre image replaced with another slide featuring a puppet resembling Bubbles the Clown and four girls, one of each of the four official races of Singapore. This particular test card was introduced in 1974 upon the introduction of colour television in Singapore, replacing a modified 625-line version of Test Card C, but was later replaced by the Philips circle pattern which had likely previously been used internally.
- New Zealand Broadcasting Corporation (NZBC) briefly used a modified version of TCF until its dissolution in 1975, replacing its common monochrome test card design dating back to the non-networked-AKTV2/CHTV3/WNTV1/DNTV2 era. It was first introduced at the beginning of colour television broadcasts in 1973. One of the two successors of NZBC (South Pacific Television; now TVNZ 2) also occasionally used TCF and another TCF-inspired test card called T1 up until approximately 1980. Upon renaming to TVNZ it subsequently replaced TCF and its variants with the Philips circle pattern which was used well into the 1990s.

== Variants and updated versions ==
=== Unlettered BBC Widescreen test card ===
A 16:9 (1.78:1) widescreen predecessor to Test Card W without an identifying letter first appeared in March 1998 as part of digital tests on the Astra 1D satellite, and was notably broadcast to the public on 6 November 1998 as part of a joke on Have I Got News for You to censor then-host Angus Deayton about discussing Peter Mandelson's life.

=== Test Card J ===
Test Card J is an updated version of Test Card F, and first appeared in June 1999. It includes the following changes relative to its predecessor:

- A newly added green square at the top of the screen is used to facilitate easier observation of chrominance to luminance delay.
- The negative black squares in the left hand step pattern should flash on and off at 1 Hz. This is to aid in the detection of frozen digital links.
- The central image is based on the same source photograph, but with some minor adjustments:
  - It has been rescanned from the original transparency for improved colour accuracy.
  - The image has been re-aligned within Test Card J such that the cross on the noughts and crosses board is at the exact centre of the screen, as some believe was originally intended.
  - It is less tightly cropped, resulting in more edge detail from the original photograph being visible.

=== Test Card W ===
Test Card W is an updated 16:9 (1.78:1) widescreen version of Test Card F. It first appeared in June 1999 alongside Test Card J, with which it bears some similarities.

The colour-bars on the top and right of the image are the full 100 per cent saturation version, unlike Test Cards F and J which use the 95 per cent type. Extra mirrored arrow-heads on the central axis at the sides mark the positions of the middle 4:3 and 14:9 sections of the image.

On Freeview in the United Kingdom, Test Card W can be viewed at any time on most Freeview boxes using the MHEG-5 multimedia standard via a secret menu on the BBC Red Button and a combination of buttons on a remote control.

==== BBC HD channel variant ("Test Card X") ====
A 1080 line variant of Test Card W (sometimes referred to unofficially as Test Card X) was used on the now-defunct BBC HD channel. It could be viewed every two hours as part of the BBC HD preview slot. When viewed, it was enhanced with 5.1 surround sound tests. A BLITS tone is played alongside, which plays test tones at different frequencies from each of the different surround sound speakers, with markers (such as L, R, C, LFE, Ls, Rs) appearing inside some of the grey boxes of the testcard. BBC HD closed in March 2013; therefore Test Card X is no longer regularly broadcast. Test Card X did however make an appearance on the lunchtime edition of Sportsday on the BBC News channel on 18 January 2023, in place of a slide intended to show the BBC Sport website.

==== BBC Two variant (2016) ====
Off-air screen capture of the 2016–2019 BBC Two iteration.

From August 2016 until July 2019, the latest iteration of the widescreen testcard could be seen briefly each morning at 7:00 am on BBC Two and BBC Two HD. At the centre bottom of the test card is an animated grey bar with graduations corresponding to 1/12 of a second. The animation is accompanied by a 'pip' that occurs when the animated bar reaches the centre mark (indicated by a 0), which together can be used to determine whether the digital audio and video signals are synchronised.

== Recent years ==
In May 1983, trade test transmissions of the test card ended when Ceefax pages began to be shown during all daytime intervals. This meant that Test Card F was only seen for a few minutes early in the morning.

1992 was the last year that Test Card F was seen daily with music; 1995 was the last year it was seen with music, although it was seen until 1999 with just tone output, and Ceefax was broadcast either with tone or music. However, since the closure of Ceefax, the shutdown of analogue television transmissions, and the imposition of budgetary constraints, a new revision of the testcard can be seen daily on BBC Two and BBC Two HD at the end of the "This is BBC Two" transmission. Each morning, as the segment concludes, the testcard is broadcast for approximately one minute.

Since the late 1990s, Bubbles has only very rarely appeared on television, as Test Card F has been discontinued, and Test Cards J and W are very seldom shown, due to the advent of digital television and 24-hour programming.

For the fortieth anniversary of Test Card F, there was some renewed interest in Bubbles in the media; in a 2007 interview, Hersee mentioned that she took Bubbles into school with her to prove to her headmaster that she really was the girl in the picture.

The BBC website previously featured Bubbles next to a blackboard with "404" inscribed on it when a user visited a page that did not exist; however, some time between July 2017 and May 2020, this was replaced with an image of two "clangers" (animated puppets) from the BBC television show Clangers. Similarly, in 2015 the BBC website's "500" Internal Error page featured a cross-eyed Bubbles appearing in front of a blackboard with a background of fire; however, this has since been replaced with the same error message seen on the 404 page.

Prior to the relaunch of BBC Three in 2022, Test Card F aired for periods of 20 minutes.

== In popular culture ==
Variations and parodies of Test Card F are common in British broadcasting, Internet sites, and games. Some prominent examples include:

- The TV series Life on Mars features a Test Card Girl based on Test Card F, who teases and torments the lead character, Sam Tyler.
- Parodies have been used in promotional material or videos for many songs (often with band members' faces), including Radiohead's 2000 album Kid A, "(Waiting For) The Ghost Train" by Madness, and the Gorillaz music video "Hallelujah Money."
- The test card has also been used in the Numberblocks episode "Tween Scenes," with Ten replacing Carole Hersee and Three replacing Bubbles the Clown.
- Dave Allen at Large included a parody of Test Card F where a hand came out and completed the game of noughts and crosses.
- BBC's Top Gear once featured a parody of Test Card F but with Bubbles the Clown's face changed to Richard Hammond's face in Season 5 Episode 9, especially in Pacific Rim Roundup.
- The Animaniacs reboot's segment "The Flawed Couple" featured a parody of Test Card F with Pinky in place of Carole Hersee and the Brain wearing clown makeup in place of Bubbles.
- RuPaul's Drag Race UK series 4 contestant Cheddar Gorgeous wore a runway look inspired by Test Card F for the season four runway "Keeping it 100!", which was held in honour of the BBC's 100th anniversary.
- The trailers of the video game Worms W.M.D (2016) parodies the Test Card F where Carole and Bubbles are replaced by worms looking like them. Also, the grid on the blackboard is replaced by a drawing of a grenade, an emblematic weapon of the game franchise.
- During Portal 2's early development, Test Card F would show on screen, while Together Again by Dave Koz would play to signify the game had ended.

== See also ==
- List of BBC test cards
