= Hersee =

Hersee is a surname. Notable people with the surname include:

- Carole Hersee (born 1958), English costume designer
- Dustin Hersee (born 1975), Canadian swimmer
- George Hersee (1924–2001), English television engineer
- Malcolm Hersee (1864–1922), Bangor F.C. and Wales international football goalkeeper
- Richard Hersee (1867–1922), Llandudno Swifts F.C. and Wales international footballer
- Rose Hersee (1845–1924), English operatic soprano
