= DNTV2 =

Local TV station in Dunedin, New Zealand

- Country: New Zealand
- Broadcast area: South Island south of the Waitaki River
- Network: NZBC TV (1969–75)

Programming
- Language: English
- Picture format: 576i black & white (1962–73); 576i PAL colour (1973–75)

Ownership
- Owner: New Zealand Broadcasting Corporation
- Sister channels: AKTV2, WNTV1, CHTV3

History
- Launched: 31 July 1962
- Closed: 31 March 1975
- Replaced by: TV One

Availability

Terrestrial
- Analogue: Channel 2 (Dunedin); Channel 1 (Southland)

DNTV2 was a television station in Dunedin, New Zealand established by the then New Zealand Broadcasting Corporation in 1962. Its base, and studio complex operated from the historic Garrison Hall in Dowling Street. Until 2010 Garrison Hall was occupied by NHNZ which has since moved to a larger facility in Melville Street. Garrison Hall remains a television production hub to this day, it is now home to Animation Research, Taylormade Media, The Video Factory and Kahawai Productions.

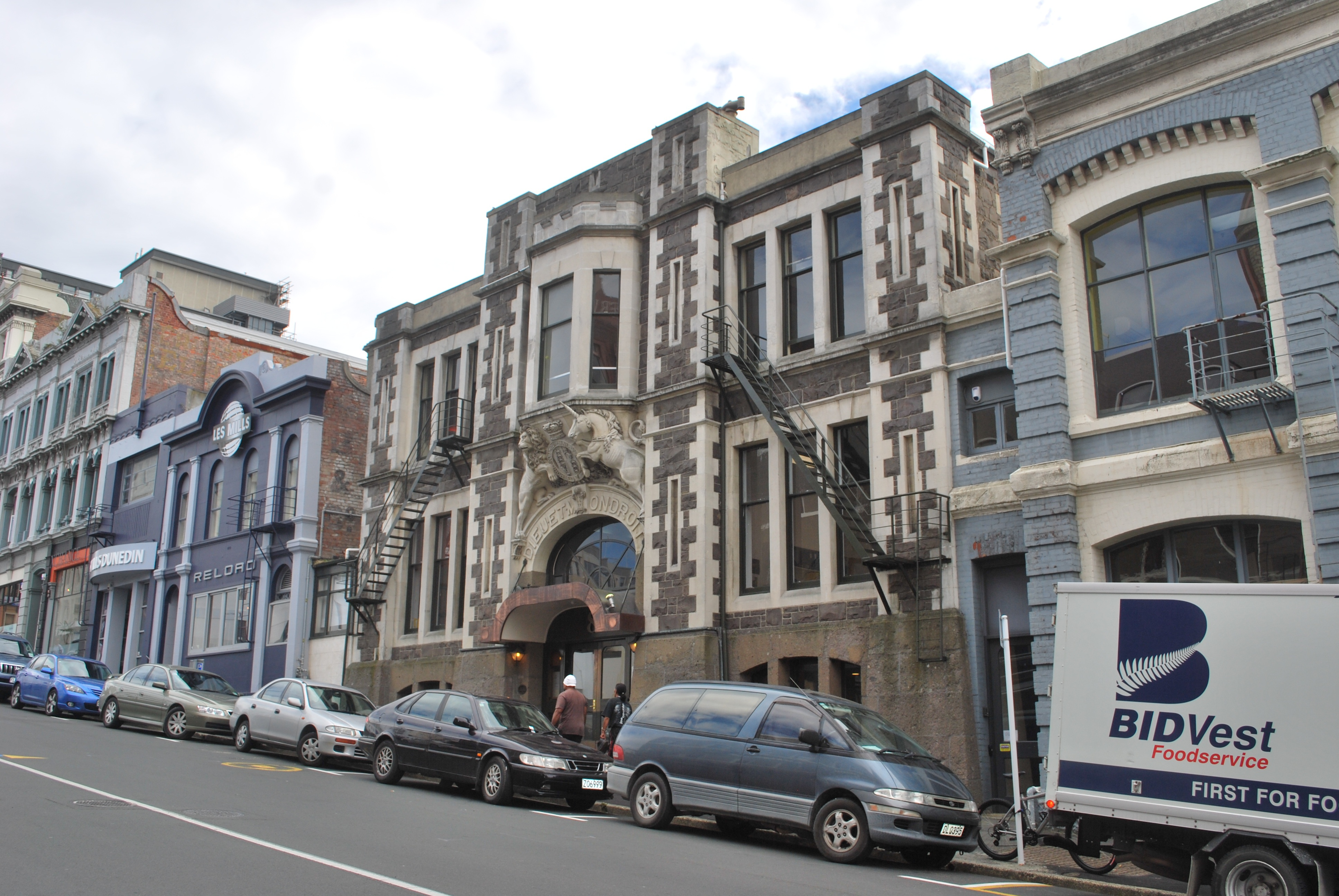
Garrison Hall, Dunedin in 2011

== History ==
Broadcasting to Dunedin began on 31 July 1962. This followed successful start ups in Auckland, Wellington and Christchurch. Initially there was no networking between the four stations, imported programmes and news footage needed to be physically sent between the different centres meaning differing transmission dates. The first programme seen at 6:30pm on launch day was a pair of children's features, Crusader Rabbit followed by Torchy the Battery Boy and ended at 10:30pm after the late news bulletin, with a final appearance from continuity announcer Beveley Pollock for the night and then the national anthem, which at the time was the British one. The first network news was read by Dougal Stevenson on 5 November 1969.

Initially, DNTV2 was broadcast from a transmitter at Highcliff. Coverage was extended to South Otago and Southland in 1964 with the commissioning of relay stations at Kuriwao and Mount Hedgehope. The Mount Cargill transmitter was commissioned in 1970 to replace the Highcliff transmitter.

Following expansion in the 1960s, news, administration and production staff moved to other locations nearby including Orbell Chambers and the Methodist Central Mission, both in Stuart Street. The set construction unit moved to Fryatt Street in the city's wharf area. This left the Garrison Hall facility as studios, transmission control, wardrobe, make-up and dressing rooms until June 1988, when a Dunedin newsroom was officially opened at the facility.

On 1 April 1975, DNTV2 was folded, along with Wellington-based WNTV1 into Television One. The newly created network would have two production facilities, those being Garrison Hall and the newly opened Avalon Television Centre. Although the Avalon facility was larger and purpose built, at times the production output from the Dunedin operation exceeded that of Avalon.

In 1980 Television One was combined with South Pacific Television to create a combined Television New Zealand. The Dunedin operation becoming one of four TVNZ production sites along with Wellington, Auckland and Christchurch. Although it was the smallest of the production centres, its share of output to the national networks stood at around 30% before TVNZ began cutbacks in the late 1980s and early 1990s. In effort to stave off competition from the soon to launch TV3, TVNZ production was scaled back nationwide and centralised in a new facility in Auckland.

While TVNZ was scaling back production, one exception was the Natural History Unit, which continued to thrive and was eventually sold off by TVNZ as a going concern as NHNZ. Other offshoot production companies were born out of TVNZ's retreat from Dunedin. Notable companies being Animation Research, Taylormade Productions, and Kids TV.

Studio recording of University Challenge

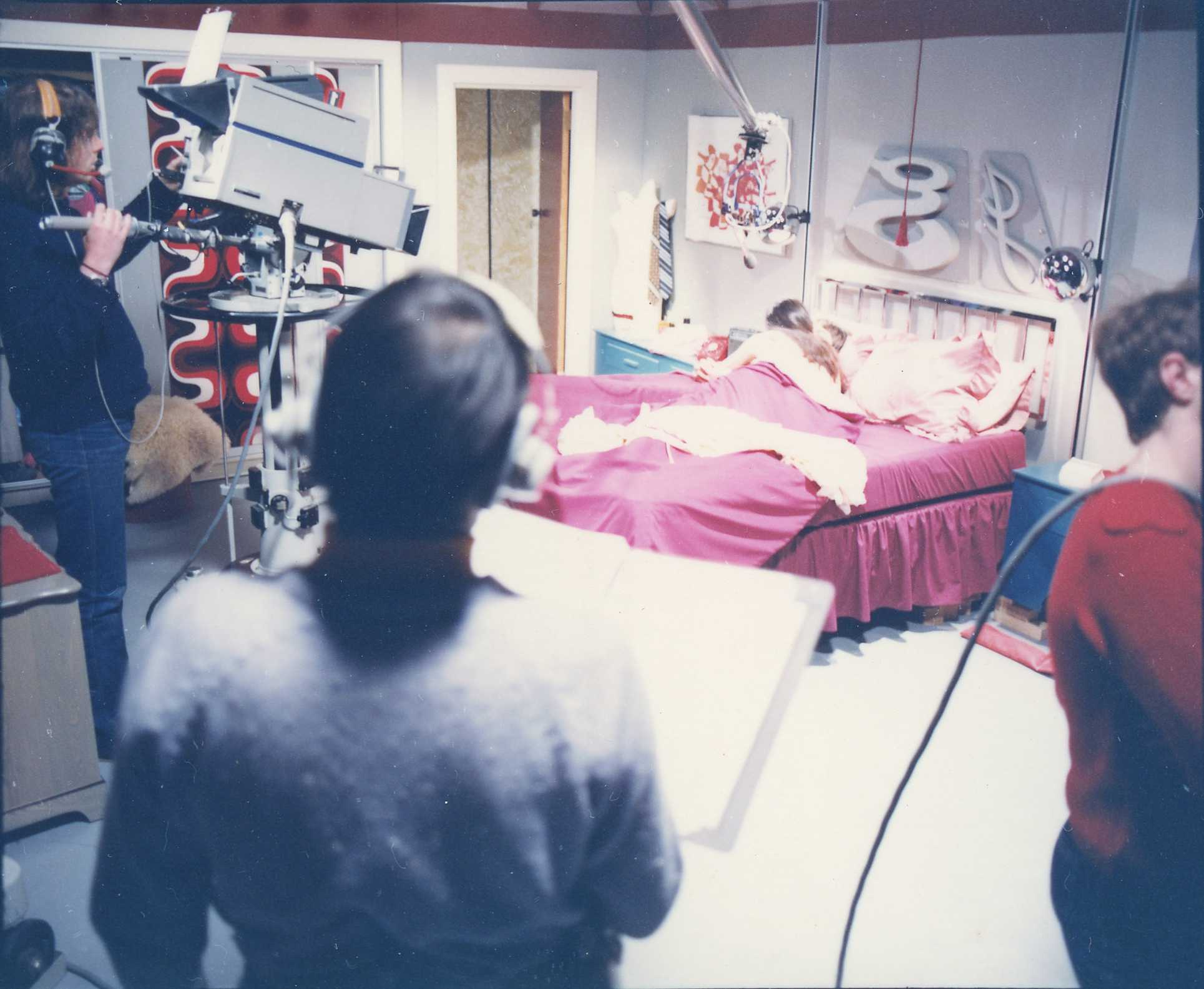
Mr Lewis Calling – Studio Set

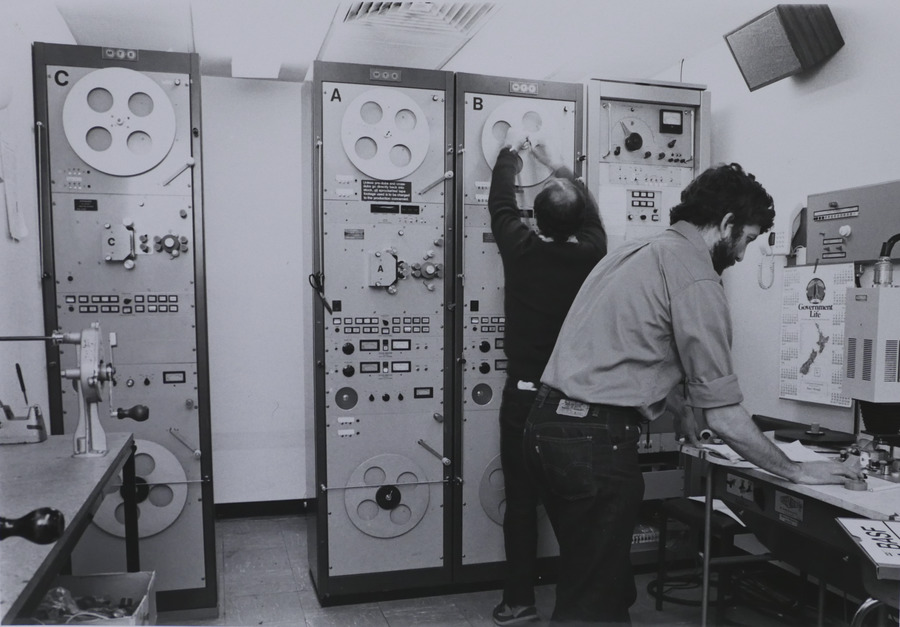
TVNZ Dunedin Refurbished Post Production Suite (1986)

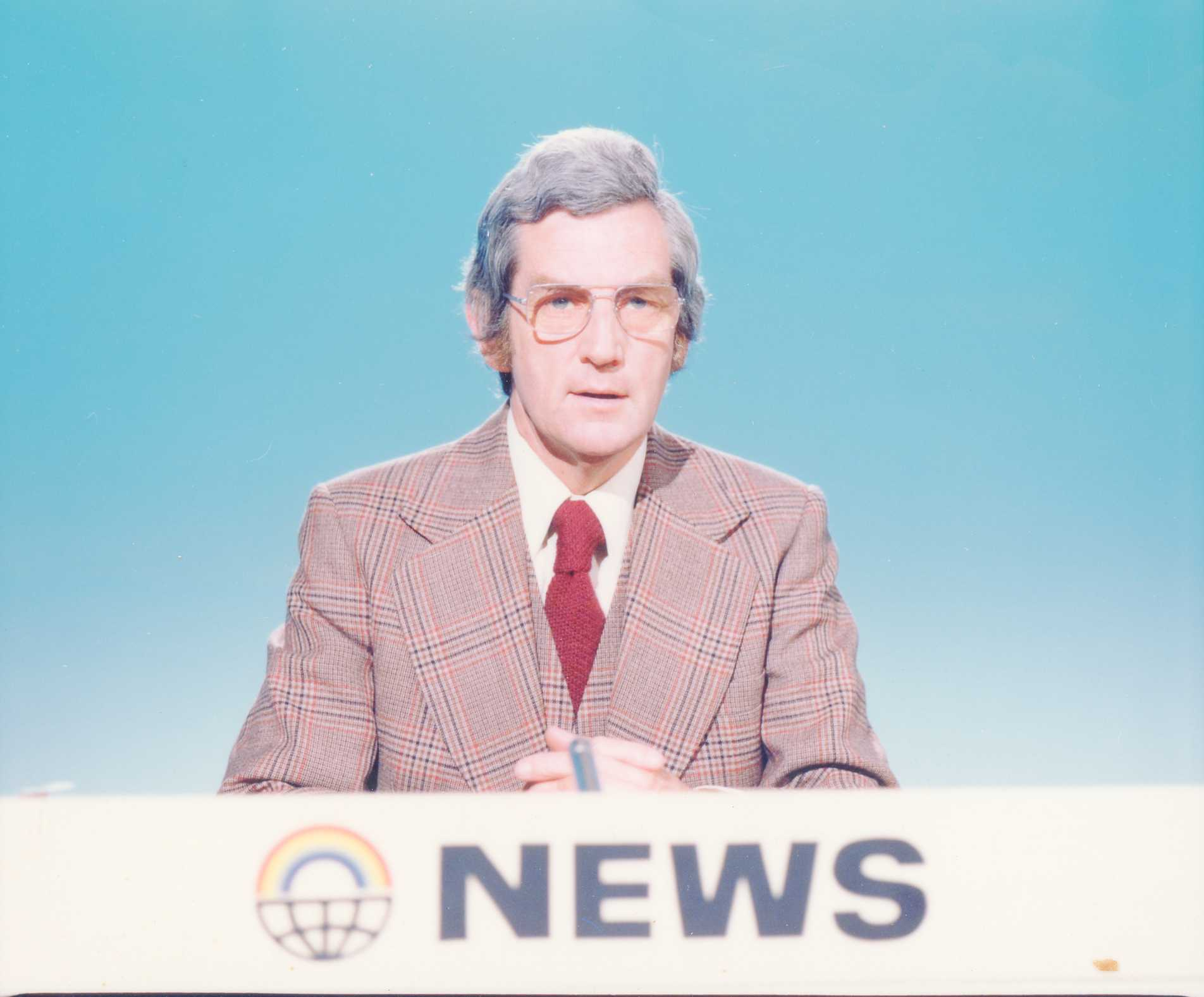
Television One News Dunedin Studio - 1970's

== See also ==
- TVNZ
- Television One
- NHNZ
- Television in New Zealand
