= Hunter's Gold =

1976 New Zealand TV series

- Genre: Adventure
- Written by: Roger Simpson; Ken Catran
- Country of origin: New Zealand
- Original language: English
- No. of episodes: 13

Production
- Producer: Tom Parkinson
- Production location: New Zealand

Original release
- Network: South Pacific Television
- Release: September 26 – December 19, 1976

Hunter's Gold is a 13-part New Zealand miniseries produced by South Pacific Television (now known as TVNZ 2) and created by Kevan Moore. Set during the Otago gold rush of the 1860s, it follows the search of a boy whose father went missing without a trace. The series was SPTV's most expensive production to date as of its premiere in 1976.

== Plot summary ==
Scott Hunter (Andrew Hawthorn) is anxious when his father (Bruce Allpress) returns home, but only his goods. He then decides to head to Tucker's Gully. On the way, he encounters thieves, a band of Chinese and Marvello the Magician (Ian Mune). Meanwhile, a riot erupts in Tucker's Gully. Scott arrives there and reunites with his father, but this does not last long as he was later shot. A new mining town is created.

== Production and airing ==
South Pacific Television (at the time using the TV2 brand for its television channel) began filming the series in February 1976, which was seen as its most ambitious production to date. Casting took place in January, where producer Tom Parkinson (of TV One's Clobber Shop) found its lead, Andrew Hawthorn, a child actor from Auckland. According to SPTV head of drama John McRae, the choice of the Shotover River instead of Lawrence or Dunstan rivers was because it would attract international buyers.

The total cost of production was NZ$326,000, excluding staff salaries. The series aired on Sunday evenings to what was describe as "a captive audience", as some children were turned off from it, thinking it to be boring.

Following the release of the series on television, a book adaptation was released in November, written by Rifer Simpson.
