= CHTV =

CHTV can refer to:

- CHTV (Swiss TV channel), a short-lived, German-language station that broadcast from 2013 to 2017
- CH Television, the former Canadian television system that was later rebranded as E!
- China Health Television (百姓健康频道), a digital satellite service launched in 2007 and operated jointly by the Chinese Ministry of Health, the China Health Education Center, and Beijing Baodi Culture Media Company
- China Satellite TV Hongkong (中华卫视), a former satellite television service that operated from 2009 to 2020, was based in the British Virgin Islands, and broadcast Mandarin-language content to viewers principally in Hong Kong, Macau, Taiwan, and the international Chinese diaspora

== See also ==
- CHTV3, a defunct New Zealand television station
