= Hudson and Halls =

Television chef duo

Peter Hudson and David Halls aka Hudson and Halls
- Peter Hudson (L) and David Halls (R) in a January 1985 television programme.
- Born: Peter John Hudson: 8 November 1930; Toorak, Melbourne, Australia; David George Halls: 14 October 1936; Epping, Essex, England
- Died: Peter Hudson: September 1992 (aged 61); London, England; David Halls: 24 November 1993 (aged 57); London, England
- Occupations: Television presenters, TV chefs
- Years active: 1976–1993
- Employer: SPTV / TVNZ / BBC
- Television: Speakeasy, Hudson & Halls (SPTV/TVNZ), Blankety Blank (Halls), Hudson & Halls (BBC), Bazaar

Peter John Hudson (8 November 1930 – September 1992) and David George Halls (14 October 1936 – 24 November 1993) were a television chef duo, whose cookery show, Hudson & Halls, ran on New Zealand television from 1976 to 1986. They gained a cult following when the pair moved to produce their show on the BBC in the United Kingdom in 1987. The duo were noted for bringing a camp humour, together with an element of slapstick, to the usually staid television cookery genre.

== Early lives ==
Peter John Hudson was born in Toorak, Melbourne, Australia, on 8 November 1930. He was adopted and did not know his parents. Hudson's adopted mother, Mary Ethel Hudson, was a trained midwife who ran an adoption agency and arranged abortions. At the time, abortions were illegal in New Zealand, and she was charged and tried for murder, along with the doctor she employed at her clinic to treat the clients who wanted a termination. Peter's mother died when he was 10 years old, and her daughter, Biddy, took over the maternity business. Hudson referred to Biddy, 21 years his senior, as his mother in later years. At 17 years old, Hudson left school and got his first job at George's department store, in the soft furnishings department. He was then sent to England, before returning to Melbourne to work as a shipping agent.

David George Halls was born in Epping, England, on 14 October 1936, to parents Hilda (née Manley) and George Taylor Halls. His parents married on 13 June 1936 at St. Barnabas Church in Woodford Green, Essex. During Halls' childhood, his mother spent time in hospital, and he took on the role of cooking Sunday lunch for the family. His parents were in service, and when Halls was 10 years old, they became the caretakers of a large house, Theydon Hall. The owners, Mr and Mrs French, treated Halls and his sister, Anne, as part of the family. At the age of 15, his parents left Theydon Hall, returning to live in a council flat. Halls left school and worked at the local Coop store. Initially considering a move to Canada, he emigrated to New Zealand in 1959, after a spell working as a footwear salesman.

In 1962, Hudson and Halls met at a party in Parnell, Auckland, New Zealand where Halls, by then a shoe designer, was living. Hudson, considering a move to the United Kingdom, had flown in from Melbourne to visit a friend. Hudson moved to Auckland, and they were soon living together, initially in Halls' flat in St Stephens Avenue, before they bought a small one bedroom cottage (with two single beds) with a swimming pool at 103 Brighton Road, Parnell. The pair held parties at their home and became known for their hospitality and cooking.

== Career ==
Hudson and Halls opened a women's shoe shop, Julius Garfinkle's, in 1971 in the Strand Arcade, Queen Street, Auckland. Later, in the same stretch of shops, they opened one of Auckland's first ice-cream parlours, Quagg's. By 1975, the pair had sold their businesses and they auditioned for the cookery slot on the TVNZ afternoon magazine programme Speakeasy by cooking a beef wellington. The audition, and the beef wellington, were successful, and they were offered six 10 minute segments at $20 per programme.

In 1976, Hudson and Halls debuted on South Pacific Television (SPTV), in New Zealand, with a 30-minute cookery show, Hudson & Halls, featuring cooking and a celebrity guest interview. The programme, which was popular in its original afternoon slot, was soon extended to an hour and moved to prime-time evening viewing. The show was consistently ranked in the weekly top five programmes, and the duo were awarded a Feltex Best Entertainer of the Year Award in 1981.

Unlike other entertainers, Hudson and Halls did not use a script, and their volatile temperaments were part of the act. The publicity material introducing the programme explained that the pair were unmarried and shared a house but their relationship was never specified. When asked about their sexuality, the network said "We don't know if they are gay, but they certainly are merry".

The programme took a break between 1978 and 1980. During this period, the duo opened The Hudson & Halls Oyster and Fish Restaurant in Ponsonby, Auckland. The restaurant, known for its outside garden area, was only open at lunchtime and not in the evening. As their popularity grew, they demanded more money from TVNZ. Hudson and Halls bought a 17-acre farm in Leigh, Auckland (where they filmed their 1984 series) and a 1962 Bentley, despite neither of them having a valid driving licence.

Hudson and Halls appeared on TV telethons, endorsed products, and were cover subjects for women's magazines. They hosted a morning radio show on Radio Pacific and Halls also briefly presented the television gameshow Blankety Blank. The pair published cookbooks in 1977 (Hudson & Halls Cookbook), 1978 (Hudson & Halls Gourmet Cookbook), 1985 (Favourite Recipes from Hudson & Halls) and 1988 (Hudson & Halls: Beginnings, Middles And Ends). Their TVNZ television series, Hudson & Halls, ran until 1986 when, after more than 300 programmes, it was abruptly cancelled.

In 1987, they took Hudson & Halls to the BBC in England, while continuing to live in New Zealand. However, reviews of their first series were universally hostile, with one critic commenting "if the BBC wanted a couple of ageing chorus boys who can open a can of lychees they could have found them closer to home". The Daily Star called them "pathetically unfunny", Spike Milligan described them as a "failed Laurel and Hardy combo" and The Independent wrote, "They think they're such fun, so camp. You'll think they're naff on roller skates."

Despite this criticism, the first series of their BBC programme attracted three million viewers, rising to 10 million by the end of the second series. The show followed the same format; cooking and celebrity guest interviews, including personalities such as Thelma Barlow, Barbara Windsor, Pam St Clement, Bonnie Langford, Dora Bryan, Gorden Kaye and Christopher Biggins. Hudson and Halls had ambitions to use their BBC programme as a stepping stone to the USA. However, this did not materialise despite the series being sold to many countries in Europe. The BBC cancelled the programme after four series, with the last episode being broadcast in December 1990.

By now, Hudson's health was failing, and the duo were struggling to find work. However, they made occasional appearances in the cooking segment on the BBC1 afternoon magazine programme Bazaar between January 1991 and June 1992. Hudson and Halls were subject to a Gotcha, a hidden camera practical joke, on Noel Edmonds' Noel's House Party, under the pretence of filming a children's cookery programme with Mr Blobby. The segment was filmed in 1992 and broadcast after Hudson's death, on 6 February 1993.

== Personal lives and deaths ==
Hudson and Halls moved from New Zealand to the United Kingdom in 1990 and lived in a flat at 60 Jermyn Street, London.

After thirty years, their long-term professional and personal relationship ended when Hudson developed prostate cancer and died in September 1992 in London, aged 61, with Halls at his side. The death was announced on 20 September 1992. A devastated Halls changed his surname by deed poll to Hudson-Halls in January 1993, and continued to make some solo television appearances.

Halls, grief-stricken and in dire financial straits, committed suicide the following year, taking an overdose of Hudson's morphine pills. Halls was found dead in the back bedroom of his London flat by two friends on 24 November 1993, with a picture of Hudson held tightly in his hand, and a note in his diary, which read "I don't want to grow old and alone, without Peter I don't want to go on – he was my life, and I have no regrets. I love him now as much as I always did and I want to be with him for all eternity." He was 57.

Halls, who had arranged and paid for his own funeral, had written the date of the service in his diary. Halls' niece, Mandy Putnam, was the police officer on duty that night, and it fell to her to inform her mother and father that Halls had died. Halls' brother-in-law, Alan Putnam, told Westminster Coroners Court, "David was very upset. They were partners in the homosexual sense."

== BBC television series ==
The first episode of Hudson & Halls was broadcast on BBC1 on 12 October 1987. The programme, typically 25 minutes in length and broadcast on Monday afternoons, ran for four series between 1987 and 1990.

Each programme followed a similar format of cooking three dishes featuring a celebrity guest who would assist in the preparation of one of the dishes before being interviewed. Hudson and Halls would cook in a tuxedo and bow tie, and argue throughout. After the dishes had been cooked, the duo would don their dinner jackets and take the food to the table, where they interviewed their guest while sampling their culinary creations.

Repeats of the first three series were broadcast on BBC1 in the mid-morning slot over the summer of 1990, and series four was repeated in autumn 1992.

=== Series 1 (1987–1988) ===
Episode	Original air date	Celebrity guest
1	Monday 12 October 1987	Roger Whittaker
2	Monday 19 October 1987	Karen Kay
3	Monday 26 October 1987	Henry Cooper
4	Monday 2 November 1987	
5	Monday 9 November 1987	Basil Brush
6	Monday 16 November 1987	Marti Webb
7	Monday 23 November 1987	Timothy West
8	Monday 11 January 1988	Grace Kennedy
9	Monday 18 January 1988	Ray Alan
10	Monday 25 January 1988	June Brown
11	Monday 1 February 1988	Vince Hill
12	Monday 8 February 1988	

=== Christmas specials (1987) ===
Episode	Original air date	Programme information
1	Monday 30 November 1987	Hudson and Halls present a selection of their favourite festive recipes.
2	Monday 7 December 1987	Hudson and Halls go home to New Zealand to begin their Christmas celebrations with a party on a friend's boat.
3	Monday 14 December 1987	Hudson and Halls invite friends to their Auckland home for a festive New Zealand style Christmas dinner.

=== Series 2 (1988) ===
Episode	Original air date	Celebrity guest
1	Monday 5 September 1988	Dora Bryan
2	Monday 12 September 1988	Bonnie Langford
3	Monday 26 September 1988	Pam St Clement
4	Monday 3 October 1988	Christopher Biggins
5	Monday 10 October 1988	Thelma Barlow
6	Monday 17 October 1988	Faith Brown
7	Monday 24 October 1988	Gorden Kaye
8	Monday 31 October 1988	Cheryl Baker
9	Monday 7 November 1988	Marti Caine
10	Monday 14 November 1988	Eve Ferret
11	Monday 21 November 1988	Barbara Windsor
12	Monday 28 November 1988	Stephanie Lawrence

=== Series 3 (1989) ===
Episode	Original air date	Celebrity guest
1	Monday 4 September 1989	Ernie Wise
2	Monday 11 September 1989	Lynda Baron
3	Monday 18 September 1989	Harlem Globetrotters
4	Monday 25 September 1989	Lynsey de Paul
5	Monday 2 October 1989	Rima te Wiata
6	Monday 16 October 1989	Peggy Mount
7	Monday 23 October 1989	Sheila Ferguson
8	Monday 30 October 1989	The viewers
9	Monday 6 November 1989	Gordon Jackson
10	Monday 13 November 1989	Sandra Dickinson
11	Monday 20 November 1989	Lizzie Webb
12	Monday 4 December 1989	Paul Jones and the Blues Band, Paul Simon

=== Series 4 (1990) ===
Episode	Original air date	Celebrity guest
1	Monday 1 October 1990	Frank Bruno
2	Monday 8 October 1990	Liz Smith
3	Monday 15 October 1990	Vicki Michelle
4	Monday 22 October 1990	Bernie Winters
5	Monday 29 October 1990	Lorna Dallas
6	Monday 5 November 1990	Leslie Crowther
7	Monday 12 November 1990	Mark Rattray
8	Monday 19 November 1990	Patrick Moore
9	Monday 26 November 1990	Jill Gascoine
10	Monday 3 December 1990	Wendy Richard
11	Monday 10 December 1990	Lorraine Chase
12	Monday 17 December 1990	Christmas special

== Selected filmography ==
Year	Title	Channel	Role	Notes
1975	Speakeasy	SPTV (New Zealand)	Chefs / Co-presenters	Six 10 minute segments
1976–1986	Hudson & Halls	SPTV / TVNZ	Chefs / Presenters	10 series
1976	Telethon 1976	SPTV	Performers	
1978	Telethon 1978	SPTV	Performers	The telethon set a Guinness World Record of $3 million in donations from a per capita of 3 million people
1979	Telethon 1979	SPTV	Performers	
1981	Royal Variety Performance	TVNZ	Performers	Performed at St James Theatre, Auckland
1982	Blankety Blank	TVNZ	Presenter	Halls presented solo
1986–1990	Hudson & Halls	BBC (UK)	Chefs / Presenters	4 series
1988	Wogan	BBC	Guests	
1990	Holmes	TVNZ	Guests	Hudson & Halls were interviewed by Paul Holmes
1990	Tonight with Jonathan Ross	Channel 4	Guests	Series 1
1991–1992	Bazaar	BBC	Chefs / Co-presenters	9 episodes
1993	Noel's House Party	BBC	Guests	Subject of a 'Gotcha' with Mr Blobby.
1993	Good Morning with Anne and Nick	BBC	Guest Chef	Halls appeared on his own, credited as David Hudson-Halls

== Legacy ==
Hudson and Halls were the subject of a 2001 documentary, Hudson & Halls – A Love Story, as well as a 2017 play, Hudson and Halls Live! A book, Hudson & Halls: The Food of Love, written by Joanne Drayton, was published in 2018.

== Bibliography ==
- Hudson & Halls Cookbook, Hamlyn (ISBN 978-0868660004, 1977)
- Hudson & Halls Gourmet Cookbook, Hamlyn (ISBN 978-0868660257, 1978)
- Favourite Recipes from Hudson & Halls, Century (ISBN 978-0712619110, 1985)
- Hudson & Halls: Beginnings, Middles And Ends, Sphere (ISBN 978-0747404170, 1988)

== See also ==
- Television in New Zealand
- List of New Zealand television personalities
- List of programmes broadcast by TVNZ
