= Children of Fire Mountain =

- Genre: Adventure
- Written by: Roger Simpson
- Directed by: Peter Sharp
- Starring: Terence Cooper; Mark Hadlow; Helen Dorward; Maggie Maxwell; Martyn Sanderson
- Countries of origin: New Zealand; United Kingdom
- Original language: English
- No. of episodes: 13

Production
- Producers: Roger Le Mesurier; John McRae
- Production location: New Zealand

Original release
- Network: BBC; South Pacific Television
- Release: 1979

Children of Fire Mountain is a 13-part miniseries from New Zealand made in 1979 for South Pacific Television (now known as TVNZ 2). That year it received the Feltex Television Awards for "Best Drama", "Best Script", and Terence Cooper as "Best Actor" for his role as Sir Charles Pemberton.

In the United Kingdom, it was shown on BBC1 three times between 3 March 1981 to 26 May 1981, 1 June 1984 to 24 August 1984 and 5 October 1985 to 28 December 1985. It was also shown on Channel 4 between 9 April 1989 to 2 July 1989.

This series was also broadcast in Czechoslovakia, where it was dubbed into both the Czech language and the Slovak language. In 2010, a DVD was released in both Czech Republic and Slovakia (with the original Slovak dubbing for both countries).

== Cast ==
- Paul Airey
- Rachel Weston
- Ross Duzevich
- Ian Narev
- Melissa Aroha-Baker
- Terence Cooper
- Peter Vere-Jones
- Mark Hadlow
- Helen Dorward
- Maggie Maxwell
- Martyn Sanderson

== Plot summary ==
Sir Charles Pemberton travelled to New Zealand from the United Kingdom on the advice of his doctor. Once there, he forms an idea to build a health spa on Maori land. The story took place in New Zealand in 1900 and portrays the conflict between the world of the Maori and the white settlers. A sub plot is the friendship between Tom (the son of the hotel owner where Sir Charles stays) and Sarah Jane (the granddaughter of Sir Charles). While it initially gets off to a rocky start, with Tom getting into a lot of trouble with his friends for being rude to their English guests, it leads to a friendship through which Sir Charles is shown the error of his ways in trying to push through his plans. Eventually, they come to nought as a volcano erupts on the land showing the danger of interfering with Maori land.

Doomey Dwyer had an illicit still, which he used to supply his 'grog'.

== Production and airing ==
Filming started on 29 January 1979; in the previous weeks, rehearsals and set construction began. Most of the filming was done at Bethells Beach, west of Auckland, but filming was done in Rotorua for two weeks. Taping was done at South Pacific Television's Shortland Street facilities in Auckland. Originally, the series was set to be titled Children of the Mist, but was renamed Children of Fire Mountain to avoid confusion with a Māori tribe which lives around Rotorua.

The series made its first broadcast on South Pacific Television on 23 September 1979, where it aired on Sundays at 7pm. The last of its thirteen episodes aired on 16 December 1979.
