= NHNZ Worldwide Footage Sales =

NHNZ Worldwide Footage Sales (previously known as NHNZ Moving Images) is a subsidiary unit of NHNZ Worldwide, a New Zealand-based factual television production house, creating original content for global broadcasters. It sells footage and outtakes from NHNZ Worldwide's documentaries.

== History ==
NHNZ Moving Images was created several years after NHNZ established an Emerging Media team to maximise opportunities for selling or re-versioning the company's large library of footage.

NHNZ Worldwide Footage Sales is now the largest repository of New Zealand documentary archive footage online in the country.

== Partnership ==
It was selected in 2011 as a partner with National Geographic Channels Worldwide to archive and sell its footage as an exclusive agent.

== New technology ==
NHNZ Moving Images in 2012 signed an agreement with New Zealand's University of Otago to develop an image recognition technology to catalogue its footage. The project aims to use the technology to identify objects in each shoot, eliminating the current labour-intensive "shot list" producers need to create before editing.
