= List of television production companies of New Zealand =

New Zealand has a quite large TV and Independent production industry, producing programs for the local market, and some for the international market. TV production in New Zealand is centred on Auckland, Wellington and Christchurch but other companies exist in towns and cities across the country.

== Production companies ==
Below is a list of New Zealand television production companies.

== A ==
- Archers Ghost Productions
- Asia Vision
- Avalon Studios

== B ==
- Beyond Productions

== C ==
- Channel North Television

== D ==
- Daybreak Pacific
- Dead Slate Studios

== F ==
- Face TV

== G ==
- Great Southern Television
- Greenstone Pictures

== H ==
Te Hokioi Film and Publishing Company (founded by Tama Poata; defunct)

== N ==
- Natural History New Zealand

== O ==
- Orly Creative Media

== P ==
- Pacific Films (historic)
- Phoenix Television
- Phoenix TV

== S ==
- South Pacific Pictures
- Studio West

== T ==
- Television New Zealand
- Touchdown Television
- TV3
- TVNZ
- TVNZ Natural History

== W ==
- Whitebait Productions
- Wingnut Films

== See also ==
- List of television production companies
