= WNTV1 =

Local TV station in Wellington, New Zealand

- Country: New Zealand
- Broadcast area: Wellington and southern North Island
- Network: NZBC TV (1969–75)

Programming
- Language: English
- Picture format: 576i black & white (1961–73); 576i PAL colour (1973–75)

Ownership
- Owner: New Zealand Broadcasting Corporation
- Sister channels: AKTV2, CHTV3, DNTV2

History
- Launched: 1 July 1961
- Closed: 31 March 1975
- Replaced by: TV One

Availability

Terrestrial
- Analogue: Channel 1 (Wellington)

WNTV1 was a television station in Wellington, the capital of New Zealand, established by the then New Zealand Broadcasting Corporation in 1961. After its local broadcasts ended in 1975, it served as the national operating base of TV One, which is now based in Auckland.

== History ==
WNTV1 was the third television station to start, after Christchurch's CHTV3 and Auckland's AKTV2, commencing broadcasts on 1 July 1961. WNTV1 served as the flagship of the NZBS/NZBC Television network, as programmes were sent to the station first, and later sent to AKTV1, CHTV3 and DNTV2.

From 1965 to 1966, WNTV1 produced the newsmagazine programme Town and Around. The 16 May 1966 issue of NZ TV Weekly had touted it as "one of the liveliest pieces of television". When Bute Hewes took over as producer in 1966, the programme's popularity among locals increased. Locally originated music show C'mon made its first airing on 26 November 1966 as a pilot programme.

At its launch, WNTV1 broadcast from a 10 kW (EIRP) transmitter atop Mount Victoria. Coverage was extended to the Wairarapa and Manawatū in 1963 with the commissioning of translators at Otahoua and Wharite Peak. In February 1967, the Mount Victoria transmitter was replaced by a new 100 kW transmitter atop Mount Kaukau.

== Aftermath ==
In 1975, the NZBC was dissolved and the Broadcasting Corporation of New Zealand began overseeing television broadcasts. TV One inherited the Wellington and Dunedin studios, but the call signs were abolished. In October 1980, all national television production moved to Auckland.

Local news was restored after the two television channels were put up under the same owner (Television New Zealand) in 1980, lasting until the end of the decade. The local programme was Today Tonight. Wellington had a Horizon Pacific Television station between 1995 and 1997, Capital Television, which also produced local news.
