= Malcolm Hersee =

Welsh footballer

Personal information
- Full name: Albert Malcolm Hersee
- Date of birth: 1864
- Place of birth: Llandudno, Caernarvonshire
- Date of death: 1922 (aged 57)
- Place of death: Conwy, Caernarvonshire

Senior career*
Years	Team	Apps	(Gls)
- Bangor

International career
1886	Wales	2	(0)
- * Club domestic league appearances and goals

Albert Malcolm Hersee (1864–1922) was a Welsh international footballer. He was part of the Wales national football team, playing 2 matches. He played his first match on 27 February 1886 against Ireland and his last match on 10 April 1886 against Scotland. At the club level, he played for Bangor.

He was the elder brother of Richard Hersee.

== See also ==
- List of Wales international footballers (alphabetical)
