= CHTV (Swiss TV channel) =

CHTV (Germany)
- Country: Switzerland
- Broadcast area: Switzerland
- Headquarters: Lucerne, Switzerland

Programming
- Language: Swiss German
- Picture format: 576i (16:9 SDTV); 1080i (HDTV)

History
- Launched: 10 June 2013; 13 years ago

Links
- Website: www.chtv.ch

CHTV was a privately owned TV channel in German-speaking Switzerland. It broadcast from 2013 to 2017.
