= TVNZ 1 =

New Zealand television channel

- Logo used since 2016
- Country: New Zealand
- Broadcast area: New Zealand
- Headquarters: Auckland, New Zealand

Programming
- Picture format: 1080i (HDTV)
- Timeshift service: TVNZ 1+1

Ownership
- Owner: Television New Zealand, Ltd.
- Sister channels: TVNZ 2; TVNZ Duke

History
- Launched: 1 June 1960; 66 years ago
- Former names: NZBC TV (1960–1975); Television One (1975–1980, 1980–1995); TV One (1995–2016)

Links
- Website: https://www.tvnz.co.nz/livetv/tvnz-1

Availability

Streaming media
- TVNZ: Watch live (NZ only)

TVNZ 1 (informally called One and TV1) is the first national television channel owned and operated by the state-owned broadcaster Television New Zealand (TVNZ). It is the oldest television broadcaster in New Zealand, starting out from 1960 as independent channels in the four main centres of Auckland, Wellington, Christchurch and Dunedin, networking in 1969 to become NZBC TV (although the individual facilities retained their call signs into the 1970s). The network was renamed Television One (TV ONE, stylised as oɴe) in 1975 upon the break-up of the New Zealand Broadcasting Corporation, and became a part of TVNZ in 1980 when Television One and South Pacific Television (now sister channel TVNZ 2) merged. The channel assumed its current name in October 2016.

TVNZ 1 is both a public broadcaster and a commercial broadcaster. Central to TVNZ 1 is news and current affairs, which is produced under the banner 1News. Also, it broadcasts sports programming under the banner 1 Sport. Other programming targets the 25 to 54 demographic, and consists of mainly drama, general entertainment and documentaries, both locally and internationally (especially British and Australian) produced.

== History ==
=== 1960–1975: NZBC TV ===
At 7:30pm on 1 June 1960, New Zealand's first television channel, AKTV2, started broadcasting in Auckland from the NZBC building at 74 Shortland Street, previously used to broadcast public radio station 1YA and now home to The University of Auckland's Gus Fisher Gallery. Owned and operated by the New Zealand Broadcasting Service (NZBS, which became the New Zealand Broadcasting Corporation in 1962), it initially broadcast for two hours a day, two days a week. Christchurch's CHTV3 followed in June 1961, Wellington's WNTV1 a month later, and Dunedin's DNTV2 on 31 July 1962.

Television licences were introduced in August 1960, initially costing NZ£4 (equivalent to NZ$233 in 2026). Television advertisements began in April 1961 and were initially allowed only on Tuesdays, Thursdays and Saturdays.

Relay stations gradually expanded the four channels into regional New Zealand. Television coverage was expanded to Waikato, Tauranga, Manawatu and Wairarapa in 1963, to Hawke's Bay, South Otago and Southland in 1964, to South Canterbury in 1965 and to Whangarei and Taranaki in 1966. In addition, a number of televiewers' societies were established to set up and operate their own translators. By 1965, 300,000 television licences had been issued, and television was broadcasting seven nights a week.

Initially, the four television stations were normally unlinked, and programmes had to be shipped between centres. For scheduled events, the stations could be temporarily interconnected, but this required considerable planning and setup. The sinking of TEV Wahine in Wellington Harbour on 10 April 1968 highlighted both the lack of, and need for, a permanent national video link. Footage shot in Wellington could not be broadcast live in other centres, and the extra-tropical cyclone which contributed to the disaster grounded air traffic, preventing film from being flown elsewhere in the country. Coverage was eventually screened in Christchurch and Dunedin using a recording made from the Wellington signal received in Kaikōura, which was then driven to Christchurch for immediate broadcast.

By the time of the Apollo 11 mission in July 1969, each island had been linked internally through a combination of microwave relays and off-air rebroadcasts, although the Cook Strait link had not yet been completed and New Zealand still lacked a direct international television link. Footage of the Moon landing was recorded on video tape at the Australian Broadcasting Commission's ABN-2 in Sydney, then flown to Wellington aboard an RNZAF English Electric Canberra. To relay the footage to the South Island, the NZBC positioned one of its first outside broadcasting vans to beam the footage across Cook Strait, from which it was distributed through the newly commissioned South Island network. The link was completed later that year, the first NZBC Network News transmitted on 3 November, read by newsreader Dougal Stevenson.

With the establishment of the Warkworth satellite station in 1971, New Zealand could finally communicate with the rest of the world. The first live broadcast received by satellite was the 1971 Melbourne Cup on 2 November.

For the first 13 years, NZBC TV broadcasts weresolely in black and white. Colour television, using the Phase alternating line (PAL) system, was introduced at 7:45 pm on 31 October 1973. The first programme broadcast in colour was the American reality show, Thrill Seekers. A major impetus for the transition was Christchurch hosting the 1974 British Commonwealth Games; however, due to limited colour facilities, only four of the ten sports (swimming, diving, athletics and boxing) could be televised in colour. Most programming transitioned over the following 18 months. Due to the broadcast lag behind the UK, Coronation Street did not switch to colour until 17 October 1974 when episode 924 (the first produced in colour) aired. Network News continued to broadcast in black-and-white until 31 March 1975 avoiding the need to refit the existing Wellington studio ahead of the move to the new Avalon Television Centre in Lower Hutt.

=== 1975–1980: Television One ===
On 1 April 1975, the NZBC was split into 3 separate state owned corporations: Television One, TV2 and Radio New Zealand.

The existing NZBC television service became Television One, and was based in Avalon Television Centre which opened that day. Television One used the WNTV1 and DNTV2 studios and the existing channel frequencies, while AKTV2's Shortland Street studios and CHTV3 studios and new channel frequencies were used for the new TV2, which commenced later that year.

In preparation for the new service, it announced a new schedule. The Network News, which were normally shown at 7pm, moved to 6:30pm to enable regional bulletins, as well as a second national bulletin at 9pm. There was also a push for more local programmes, which executives hoped to cover 50% of the schedule. These included panel shows such as You be the Judge and one on marriage partners, whose pilots were shot in Dunedin, and The Inventors, which was a joint with Australia. Two new music shows were also being produced. Some programmes from the NZBC era were removed. Then the two channels started to find imported programming once they became fully operational, acquiring the rights to BBC series Colditz and hit US series M*A*S*H and Cannon.

Television One commenced transmission on Tuesday 1 April 1975 at 2 pm with a five-minute news bulletin read by Bill McCarthy, followed by the British drama series Harriet's Back in Town. Its two-hour opening special was broadcast live to air at 7pm that evening and featured a preview of the programmes, plans and personalities for the new service. The relaunched channel carried commercials Tursdays through Saturdays, but would cut commercials on Fridays beginning in September. Transmissions now opened with a video of children singing God Defend New Zealand (which, at the time, had no official status) in a hilltop, but still ended with a video of God Save the Queen, which was the de jure national anthem until 1977. Network controller Bill Munro decided to change the closedown video to the New Zealand anthem (as seen at start-up), under the grounds that "television has to be a constantly changing thing".

On Saturday 17 July 1976, after snow and gale-force winds cut mains power to the Blue Duck microwave station near Kaikōura, the station's diesel generator failed and left it running on batteries. The batteries eventually discharged by 7pm that evening, severing the Television One network feed south into Canterbury, Otago and Southland. Technicians couldn't reach the station to repair the diesel generator and restore the network until late on Sunday morning, meaning most of the South Island missed the live opening ceremony of the 1976 Summer Olympics.

=== 1980–present: TVNZ ===
In 1980, the two television channels merged to form Television New Zealand, with the purpose of finally providing a dividend to the Government. The merger was promised to provide 'complementary programming' for both channels. The channel was renamed as "Television One" until early 1995, when it was announced on-air as just "TV One".

Regional news programming was reintroduced from 31 March 1980 screening at 7.30pm for half an hour. The regional programmes broadcast from the four main TVNZ studios in Auckland (Top Half), Wellington (Today Tonight), Christchurch (The Mainland Touch) and Dunedin (7.30 South). Later that year, in October, all national television production moved to Auckland.

Children's news programme Video Dispatch started in 1980 with Dick Weir as the presenter. It aired twice a week in the afternoon. The initial editor was Chris Mitson, later replaced in 1982 by Chris Shellock and David Shellock. Mitson came up with the programme's name while he was at a pub.

In 1982, the regional programmes were incorporated into the network news bulletin with 7.30 South rebranded as The South Tonight. Each region would break out from the network news for a 20-minute regional programme before returning to the network news for the weather. In 1989 the regional programmes were transferred to Network Two in the new timeslot of 5.45pm, and Top Half and Today Tonight were axed later that year. In 1990, The Mainland Touch and The South Tonight were transferred back to Television One and screened immediately after the Māori news programme Te Karere (live at 5.20pm in the North Island, delayed at 5.35pm in the South Island) and before the network news. Both programmes were axed altogether at the end of 1990.

In September 1986, Harold Anderson was appointed director of TV One, having returned from the BBC, where he coordinated its coverage of the 1984 Summer Olympics in Los Angeles and, while in London, had become the BBC's head of Games and Sport. Under his tenure, he began formulating a new identity for the channel.

The channel started 24-hour broadcasts on 19 March 1995, beginning to relay BBC World overnight.

TV One was repositioned in 1997, increasing the amount of New Zealand programmes, news and current affairs programming and sports. TVNZ also introduced Breakfast as part of the plan. Facing the loss of rugby and cricket coverage, the channel prepared the 2000 season with an uptick in local content and prepared to double down on programming sponsorship, as the channel's revenue improved. Moreover, it planned to reinforce its dominance by showing "sophisticated programmes" and was receiving bids for a tender for a local long-running drama series, which, according to channel programmer Karen Bieleski, would be akin to Australian series Blue Heelers.

For the 2007, season, the channel announced The Point as the lead-in to One News at Six while the channel would return to its "traditional strengths". The Sunday Theatre brand had returned in the previous year, as it was condemned for being "conservative" and "not very accessible".

Logo used from 1 July 2013 until 30 September 2016.

In August 2008, TV One, along with TV2, moved to 720p high-definition for the start of the 2008 Summer Olympics in Beijing. Both channels were originally only available in high-definition on the Freeview HD platform, before commencing high-definition broadcasts on the Sky platform on 1 June 2009 now moved to 1080i in August 2010. On 28 November 2025, at 7'o'clock New Zealand Daylight Time, Simon Dallow officially retired after 30 years of being a journalist.

In October 2016, the channel was renamed TVNZ 1.

== Branding ==
TV One has used numerous logos throughout its history. Until 2016, all displayed "one" as a word, rather than as a number. The original 1975 logo featured large rounded lettering, with the top half of the "o" in the lowercase "one" divided into rainbow colours. According to a print advertisement published to newspapers on 1 April, the relaunched service's launch date, it represented its general philosophy "to present the best of world television in the most exciting manner and to produce New Zealand television of an equally high standard". This was replaced after the formation of Television New Zealand in 1980, with a logo featuring a red ribbon displaying the channel’s name with inline lettering in blue, the first letter being capital, under what is the Southern Cross.

The Friz Quadrata typeface and a more classical look debuted in 1987, contrasting Channel 2's more contemporary appearance. The more familiar sans serif italic lettering, with mixed case lettering, was launched during the 1996 Olympics, variations of this logo were used up to 2013 with the colours changing every few years or the logo behind a coloured background. At the end of January 2006, it unveiled a new identity. In 2007, TV One rebranded, adopting orange as its new on-air colour, at the cost of NZ$300,000, with the aim of making the channel more relevant to local audiences. In 2013 the logo was changed, continuing to use the sans serif lettering but no longer in italics.

In October 2016, TV One was rebranded as TVNZ 1 with the logo changed to simply the number 1 in bold black with a red scribble pattern around the number, while sister channel TV2 renamed TVNZ 2, with a similar purple scribble pattern around the number.

== Programming ==
Long-running TVNZ 1 programmes include rural documentary show Country Calendar (since 1966) and consumer affairs show Fair Go (since 1977). The twice-weekly Lotto draw airs on TVNZ 1 at 8:00pm on Saturdays and 8:20pm on Wednesdays.

=== News operation ===
TVNZ 1 broadcasts approximately 28 hours of news and current affairs programming per week. The flagship news bulletin is the daily hour-long 1 News at 6pm. Breakfast airs from 6:00am to 9:00am on weekdays with five-minute bulletins every half-hour. The Māori language bulletin Te Karere airs at 4:00pm on weekdays.

Seven Sharp is a half-hour current affairs magazine show, airing on weekdays following the 6pm news bulletin. The hour-long political affairs show Q+A airs on Sunday mornings.

== Technical details ==
From launch in 1960 until digital television transition was completed on 1 December 2013, TVNZ 1 broadcast terrestrially using analogue PAL-B&G.

The channel is broadcast on the government owned Kordia terrestrial network as well as on one of the two Kordia satellite transponders, which is included in channel packages on the Freeview, Igloo (2012–2017), and Sky platforms.

== TVNZ 1+1 ==
TVNZ 1+1
- Broadcast area: National

Programming
- Picture format: 16:9 (SDTV)

Ownership
- Owner: Television New Zealand

History
- Launched: 1 July 2012
- Replaced: TVNZ 7
- Former names: TV One Plus 1 (2012–2016)

Logo used from 1 July 2013 until 30 September 2016.

TVNZ 1+1 was launched to Freeview and Sky customers from 1 July 2012 as TV ONE Plus 1. It is a channel with a one-hour delay of TVNZ 1. This channel replaced TVNZ 7, which was a public service news and documentary channel. The channel is available on Channel 6 on Freeview and 501 on Sky. On 1 September 2013, when TV2+1 (now called TVNZ 2+1) launched to replace TVNZ U, TV ONE Plus 1 moved to Channel 6 on Freeview, while TV2+1 took over Channel 7. The channel was rebranded as TVNZ 1+1 on 1 October 2016. On 21 March 2022, TVNZ 1+1 moved from Freeview channel 6 to Freeview channel 11 as part of six Freeview channel changes; the former allocation was given over to TVNZ Duke.
