= Carole Hersee =

Costume designer and BBC test card model (born 1958)

- Born: 25 November 1958 (age 67); Redhill, Surrey, England
- Occupation: Costume designer
- Known for: Appearing on Test Card F from 1967–1998
- Father: George Hersee

Carole Hersee (born 25 November 1958) is an English costume designer who is best known for appearing in the centrepiece of the United Kingdom television Test Card F (and latterly J, W, and X), which aired on BBC Television from 1967 to 1998. As such, she became the most aired face in British television history.

== Test Card F ==
The card was developed in 1967 by her father, BBC engineer George Hersee, who started by snapping test photographs of Carole and her younger sister, Gillian; Carole believes she was ultimately chosen to appear on the card simply because Gillian was without two of her front teeth at the time. However, in an interview with Andy Emmerson in 1988 George recollects photographing both, but the committee chose Carole as she had lighter hair. Someone noticed Carole appeared to be left-handed, so to make it seem that she was holding the chalk in her right hand they flipped the transparency. She was posed with a strategically placed Noughts and Crosses board (the "X" painted in the left centre square was directly in the middle of the screen) and her own clown doll named Bubbles, which was brought on set specifically for the photo shoot. She was paid £100 for the shoot. The card (actually a 35mm transparency) was used on television in the UK and elsewhere for more than four decades, usually while there was no on-air programming.

Because of the card's prolonged exposure on the BBC, Hersee received fan mail during her teenage years and was regularly contacted by media outlets for interviews, but she quickly grew tired of the publicity. According to a November 2006 article featuring test card enthusiast Keith Hamer, Hersee is in Guinness World Records for the longest television appearance in history — an estimated total of 70,000 hours, equivalent to nearly eight continuous years. However, she denied this in a May 2007 interview with The Daily Telegraph, saying, "[It] can't be put in the Guinness Book of Records because it isn't a record that somebody else can achieve, apparently". Hersee still owns the Bubbles doll, which she keeps stored inside a box.

On the 2006–2007 television series Life on Mars, Hersee was depicted as a fictional character called the Test Card Girl, played by Rafaella Hutchinson in series one and by Harriet Rogers in series two. Appearing to the protagonist in brief visions, she would often taunt Sam Tyler (John Simm) and occasionally scare him greatly. She is the final character seen in the series when she mimes turning a switch at the side of the screen and the image disappears, similar to an old television set.

== Career ==
Hersee attended Heath End School in Farnham, and as an adult became a seamstress for a supplier of theatrical costumes. She has designed costumes for several West End theatre productions and films, including The Last Emperor, Flash Gordon and Dangerous Liaisons.

== See also ==
- Lenna
