= Richard Hersee =

Association football player

Personal information
- Full name: Richard John Charles Hersee
- Date of birth: 25 November 1867
- Place of birth: Llandudno, Caernarvonshire, Wales
- Date of death: 5 May 1922 (aged 55)
- Place of death: Conwy, Caernarvonshire, Wales

Senior career*
Years	Team	Apps	(Gls)
- Llandudno Swifts

International career
1886	Wales	1	(1)
- * Club domestic league appearances and goals

Richard John Charles Hersee (25 November 1867 – 5 May 1922) was a Welsh international footballer. He was part of the Wales national football team, playing 1 match and scoring 1 goal on 27 February 1886 against Ireland. At club level, he played for Llandudno Swifts.

He was the younger brother of Malcolm Hersee.

== See also ==
- List of Wales international footballers (alphabetical)
