= CHTV3 =

Local TV station in Christchurch, New Zealand

- Country: New Zealand
- Broadcast area: South Island north of the Waitaki River
- Network: NZBC TV (1969–75)

Programming
- Language: English
- Picture format: 576i black & white (1961–73); 576i PAL colour (1973–75)

Ownership
- Owner: New Zealand Broadcasting Corporation
- Sister channels: AKTV2, WNTV1, DNTV2

History
- Launched: 1 June 1961
- Closed: 31 March 1975
- Replaced by: TV One

Availability

Terrestrial
- Analogue: Channel 3 (Christchurch)

CHTV3 was a television station in Christchurch, New Zealand, established by the then New Zealand Broadcasting Corporation (at the time New Zealand Broadcasting Service) in 1961.

== History ==
Test signals began on 5 May 1961, largely aimed at shops selling television sets. The station started broadcasting on 1 June 1961 as the second NZBS/NZBC television station. At launch, it carried two hours of programming per evening. Alan Dunfold was its announcer on opening night. In October-November of that year, it aired the talent show Time Out for Talent. Bill Taylor was at AKTV1 when it started in 1960 and moved to CHTV3 upon its beginning. Transmission was reported to be "faulty" during its first year in operation. By June 1962, there were no less than 3,000 television sets. A mobile transmitter was due early January 1963, installed by Beaths.

A relay transmitter for Timaru was approved in July 1963, broadcasting on channel 6, a VHF channel not yet used by NZBC.

In December 1964, it was announced that from March 1965, CHTV3 would increase its facilities and capabilities of producing local programming. Since launch, it resorted to a single studio whose news set was constantly being dismantled. A second continuity suite would be established at the building's second floor.

On 28 August 1965, CHTV3 moved to broadcasting from the new 100 kW transmitter atop Sugarloaf in the Port Hills, replacing the 10 kW transmitter in Gloucester Street used since the channel's launch. The transmitter, costing NZ£400,000, was officially opened in October 1965. There was still no reception in Nelson, as engineers by February 1966 were struggling to increase coverage there. By August, a translator was installed in Kaikoura, broadcasting on channel 7. At the time, the city had 400 television sets.

On 3 April 1967, CHTV moved its start-up time earlier from 5pm to 2pm. Director N. Johnson assisted the first afternoon broadcasts.

An experimental microwave link between CHTV3 and WNTV1 was made on 15 November 1967, lasting for seventeen minutes, using microwave stations from the post office. At 11:18am on 4 January 1968, a television set at the station's control panel burned. On 5 February, three tape recorders, all worth NZ$135, were stolen by a crippled elderly woman. This came after the display case at Manchester Street was broken in the previous weekend.

The Canterbury Rugby Union opposed the ban of a rugby telecast on 15 June 1970 because this would put the station in a conflict with DNTV2, especially when the two station's coverage areas overlapped.

A power cut at the Buller district caused by a near gale caused CHTV3's transmissions to be interrupted locally for five hours on 4 January 1971. By March 1971, the region had over 85,000 television sets. At the time of its tenth anniversary, it had a staff of 67.

By 1972, the station had increased its dependence on the networked microwave link to deliver sporting events, such as the New Zealand test match with Wales on 3 December that year.

On 9 August 1973, the station announced the trimming of its evening schedule, ending at 10pm, due to the electricity shortage. In December, the translator used in Hokitika had to be replaced, in line with the station's conversion to colour. It was expected that the West Coast could receive full-on colour telecasts from 1975.

By the time the name CHTV3 was discontinued in 1975 in favour of TV One; most of the output, with the exception of Network News, The South Tonight and The Right to Know was still in black and white. The changes later in 1975 implied that Canterbury and Kaikoura now received TV One from Wellington. TV2 (also known as South Pacific Television until the 1980 merger) took over CHTV3's infrastructure after that, but was not available in Kaikoura.

== Criticism ==
On 13 September 1971, the station received criticism from the NZBC regarding the films End of a Dialogue and Who is Vasco Mutwa?, which had controversial views regarding apartheid in South Africa. One writer asked The Press on the lack of weather data for Invercargill (which was in DNTV2's coverage area in 1973.
