= Dougal Stevenson =

New Zealand television presenter

Dougal Stevenson QSM
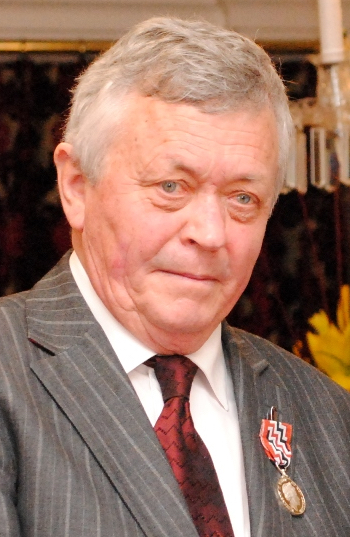
- Stevenson in 2012
- Born: 1942 (age 83–84); Dunedin, New Zealand
- Occupations: Television news anchor, broadcaster, narrator
- Years active: 1964-
- Known for: Broadcasting

John Dougal Stevenson QSM (born 1942) is a former New Zealand television news presenter.

== Early life ==
Born in Dunedin in 1942 to a young unmarried mother, Stevenson was adopted out while still a young infant to a family living near Wānaka in Central Otago. His adoptive father was a farmer; his adoptive mother – who died when Dougal was still a young child – was a classically trained musician. After his adoptive mother's death, Stevenson was sent to boarding school, which was—in his own words—"barbaric", followed by high school (John McGlashan College), which did not interest him.

== Broadcasting career ==
Stevenson began his broadcasting career in 1964 with the regional Dunedin station DNTV2, and in 1969 was chosen to read the first nationwide news bulletin for the new countrywide television network (on 5 November). He remained as the country's main newsreader on NZBC and its successor (TVNZ)'s early-evening news through much of the 1970s, also presenting the nine o'clock evening news digest Tonight at Nine. Since leaving a regular anchor role, he has appeared as presenter and narrator of many series, his distinctive voice making him a popular choice for documentary work. As Jane Bowron of The Dominion Post once opined "His voice is authoritative. If there is an end-of-the-world broadcast kept in readiness for the final moments on Earth, I hope TVNZ has chosen Dougal to announce it." His reputation within New Zealand broadcasting is also such that he has appeared as himself in cameos in two New Zealand films, Sleeping Dogs (1977) and In My Father's Den (2004). In 2012 he finally made his debut in a true acting role, starring as "Grandad Jack" in a six-minute short film by Gem Waterhouse, Forget Me Not.

In 1987 he was chosen to host the Australasian version of the popular ITV-produced Granada Television quiz show The Krypton Factor.

Following his retirement from TVNZ, Stevenson became the host of the Allied Press‑owned Dunedin television station Channel 39's Dunedin Diary weekly current affairs show.

Stevenson was named New Zealand Television Personality of the Year at the 1976 Feltex Awards, and in the 2012 Queen's Birthday and Diamond Jubilee Honours received the Queen's Service Medal for services to broadcasting. He currently lives at Deborah Bay, near Port Chalmers, Dunedin.
