= George Hersee =

BBC engineer (1924–2001)

- Born: 29 December 1924; Loxwood, West Sussex, England
- Died: 11 April 2001 (aged 76); Bournemouth, Dorset, England
- Education: University of Southampton
- Occupation: Television engineer
- Spouse: Audrey Florence Mayers (m. 1957; death 2001)
- Children: 2 (Carole and Gillian)
- Scientific career
- Fields: Engineering
- Workplaces: BBC

George Hersee (29 December 1924 – 11 April 2001) was an English television engineer for the BBC. He is the developer of Test Card F, which came about after Hersee was asked to intervene by the committee charged with the creation of technical standards for the new colour television services. He began working for the BBC's studio installation and planning department, holding responsibility for buying and installing equipment in the chain from the camera lens or microphone to the transmitting aerials at the BBC Studios. Hersee also established England's first talking newspaper in 1970. He retired from the BBC in 1979, working for a small private engineering company dealing with lenses.

== Early life ==
Hersee was born on 29 December 1924 at Orchard Cottage, Loxwood, near Wisborough Green, West Sussex, England. He was the son of the estate clerk Ernest Alfred George Hersee and his wife, the shop manager Florence Lillian (née Harris). Hersee had two siblings. He was first taught at Elm Grove School, Littlehampton. Hersee later won a bursary to attend Chichester High School For Boys, where he was educated from 1935 to 1941. From 1942, he attended the University College, Southampton, where he studied electrical engineering. From there, Hersee joined the Army Cadet Force.

== Career ==
In 1944, Hersee left university to work for EMI, spending the next five years there. He joined the BBC in 1949, and became a member of the corporation's studio installation and planning department in 1949, with responsibility for the acquisition and installation of the equipment in the chain from the camera lens or microphone to the transmitting aerials at the BBC Studios. Hersee became to be a specialist in the cameras and equipment for viewing captions, which led to designing and, with the greetings-card designers Messrs Royles. His unit was assigned to increased the BBC's resources for television, working at such studios as Lime Grove Studios, Alexandra Palace, Riverside Studios, Television Theatre, Television Centre, London and Pebble Mill Studios, Birmingham. Hersee's first task was to re-equip the 405 line black and white television studios to operate on 625 lines, the provision of new 625-line black and white studios and later the provision and design of new colour television studios in London and then other BBC regions.

Later, he was specialising in lens and test card transparency specifications and became one of the leaders in this new field by the late 1950s.During BBC Television's first years in the 1930s, cameras were primitive; however, as technology became more advanced, it became necessary to have a test card at which the camera could be pointed to check the technical performance of the transmission from studio to viewer. Experiments with colour television had been held in the 1950s, but it was not until the mid-1960s that it became apparent that the BBC could launch a proper fully fledged colour television service and a new test card was required. Hersee and the rest of the committee leading the new design (including representatives from both the BBC and the Independent Broadcasting Authority, and also BREMA, the organisation representing television engineers) had multiple problems.

Hershee developed Test Card F in 1967, for use in assessing the performance of both colour and black-and-white television sets. He recognised there had to be a model to allow technicians to check if the skin tones were accurately represented on television sets. Because the face of the child was ideal for this for several reasons, Hershee proposed that a child be in the test card for the central image of the test card, saving money. He took pictures of his two children, Carole and Gillian, not believing either girl would be selected because he expected that a professional model would be used by the committee instead. However, they liked the photograph of Carole because it was of higher quality, and he took another photograph with her rag-doll clown Bubbles playing a game of noughts and crosses on a blackboard. The X in the game marked the centre of the picture and the main colours were represented by her red dress, the yellow tablecloth, the blue background, and the cyan clown. The test card was first broadcast in 1967 and was on air for an estimated 70,000 hours on the BBC.

Hersee wrote the monograph entitled A Survey of the Development of Television Test Cards Used in the BBC in 1967. After his mother became blind, he setup England's first talking newspaper in Farnham in 1970, called the Farnham and Alton Talking Newspaper. Hersee was assisted by BBC colleagues John Anthony, Donald Gray and Michael Nightingale and, as the group's engineer, designed and constructed the control desk where the newspapers were recorded onto reel-to-reel tapes before switching to cassette tapes as the technology progressed. He retired from the BBC in 1979, after 30 years with the corporation. Hersee went to work for the private engineering company Canda, a small firm dealing with lenses. Hershee became the honorary secretary of the BBC Retired Engineers' Luncheon Club (RELICS), a club for retired BBC engineers that holds three informal social gatherings every year. He also maintained his connections with the University of Southampton, reviving the London Branch of Convocation that became the University of Southampton Society in 1949; Hershee missed only two of the annual dinners held there in five decades.

== Personal life ==
He married Audrey Florence Mayers, whom he had met through the BBC rambling club, on 29 April 1957. They had two children. Hershee suffered a heart attack while shopping with his wife, and although revived by ambulance paramedics, he had another heart attack the day after. He died at the Royal Bournemouth Hospital on 11 April 2001.

== See also ==
- Test Card J
- Test Card W
- Test card
- List of BBC test cards
- Bubbles the Clown
