= NHNZ =

New Zealand television production house

NHNZ Worldwide
- Founded: 1977; 49 years ago
- Parent: Fox International Channels (1997–2013); Blue Ant Media (2017–2023)

NHNZ Worldwide (formerly Natural History New Zealand and also known as NHNZ) is a New Zealand–based television production house.

It works and co-produces with multiple major global broadcasters: Discovery Channel, Animal Planet, Discovery Science, A&E Television Networks, National Geographic Channel, Travel Channel, NHK (Japan), France 5 and ZDF (Germany). NHNZ's programmes are available in 180 countries.

== History ==
=== The early years ===
NHNZ was originally formed as the Natural History Unit of TVNZ. The unit was created in 1977, with the aim of telling stories of New Zealand native and endangered species.

The unit's first documentaries made were a series of six 15-minute programmes called Hidden Places which featured various New Zealand habitats, notably Ōkārito, White Island, Fiordland, Mackenzie Country and Sinclair Wetlands, near Dunedin.

The first programme that captured international attention was the story of Don Merton's rescue of the New Zealand black robin from the brink of extinction. Several programmes were made chronicling this success story – Seven Black Robins, The Robins Return and finally Chatham Island a Black Robin Story.

In 1997 the production house was sold, and became a subsidiary of Fox International Channels. In October 2012, former Fox executive David Haslingden acquired 100% of NHNZ.

=== Blue Ant Media acquisition ===
In May 2017, the Canadian media company Blue Ant Media acquired NZHNZ and its parent company, the RACAT Group.

In mid-July 2020, Blue Ant Media announced that it would be selling NHNZ's Melville Street building in order to avoid having capital tied up in real estate. However, the company would remain in the premises.

In January 2021, television producer Julie Christie purchased a majority stake in NHNZ and became chief executive officer. Blue Ant Media retained a significant minority interest in the company, which was rebranded NHNZ Worldwide.

== Documentaries ==
=== Notable work ===
NHNZ is known for their extensive work in creating documentaries in Antarctica. The first, in 1982, featured the private life of Adelie penguins, paved the way for a further 18 titles. Icebird and Under the Ice were early offshore successes for the company. An early pair of documentaries produced by NHNZ, Emperors of Antarctica and The Longest Night, chronicled the overwintering activities of scientists from Antarctica New Zealand, produced by Max Quinn. In 1992, these were joined by a third Solid Water Liquid Rock produced by Mike Single. This trilogy helped to establish a relationship with Discovery Channel.

In 2010, NHNZ started producing 3D factual programming. NHNZ's first 3D documentary China Revealed: The Great Wall of China debuted on one of the world's first full-time 3D networks, -3net. In 2012, NHNZ announced it was taking a lead role in the development of cost-effective 2D to 3D conversion technology, in partnership with Korean company ETRI. ETRI will use NHNZ's HD documentaries as test subjects for trialling the new technology.

=== Notable series ===
Various series produced by NHNZ have received awards and accolades. In 2000, NHNZ cameraman Mike Single won an Emmy for outstanding cinematography for The Crystal Ocean, which focused on the cycle of water freeze and thaw in Antarctica.

NHNZ has made many successful series of programmes working with Animal Planet, including The Most Extreme, a series produced by Ian McGee. NHNZ produced 65 episodes of this series from 2002 to 2007.

The forerunner to The Most Extreme was Twisted Tales, two companion series produced in 1999 and 2000. Twisted Tales: The Bat earned NHNZ's second Emmy Award in 1999 for Ian McGee in the category of Outstanding Achievement in a Craft in News and Documentary Programming – Writers. The following year, Ian and co-writer Quinn Berentson were again nominated for an Emmy Award in the same category for Twisted Tales: The Rat.

In 2008, NHNZ began a new series, I Survived..., which airs on the Biography Channel. The series has over 60 episodes, and has its own spinoff series, I Survived: Beyond and Back. Other successful series include Orangutan Island and Life Force.

=== Diversification ===
Over the years, NHNZ diversified its programming away from natural history. The genres covered were expanded to cover health (Kill or Cure series); science (X=Force the Science of ... series; Mega Disasters series); adventure (Adventure Central series); and people (Tribal Life series; The Diva Mummy). The company has also notably produced a range of engineering focused series under the Man Made Marvels and MegaStructures banners.

== NHNZ Moving Images ==
In 2007 NHNZ established an Emerging Media team to maximise opportunities for either selling or re-versioning the company's footage for broadcast via a variety of platforms, including mobile phone clips and online video.

Several years later it created NHNZ Moving Images, NHNZ's footage archive unit. This unit sells footage and outtakes from NHNZ programmes.

In 2011 the unit signed a deal to represent National Geographic Channel's worldwide library of more than 20 years of accumulated footage from its blue-chip factual programming library, including hundreds of hours of HD footage.

== NHNZ Worldwide ==
In 2021 Television producer Dame Julie Christie purchased a majority stake in NHNZ and become chief executive officer.

A new company called NHNZ Worldwide Ltd was incorporated on 29 January 2021.

Former owner, Canadian company Blue Ant Media retains a significant minority interest in the company, which has been rebranded NHNZ Worldwide, and Blue Ant Media have a seat on its board of directors.

== Other media ==
In 2009, NHNZ started up a gaming division, Runaway, which has developed several video games, both for social media (Facebook), and mobile.

Runaway notably produced Flutter, a Facebook game that involves breeding butterflies and is associated with the World Wildlife Fund. After being accredited by Facebook, the game grew to have more than 600,000 online players. Flutter play online ceased in December 2011 to allow for new game development, and Runaway announced in September 2012 on its blog that it had a mobile version of the game being tested and almost ready to be released.

Runaway has also produced mobile games Howling Mouse and Puzzle Planet, both in association with National Geographic Channel.

== Education ==
In 2002, NHNZ entered into a partnership with the University of Otago, in Dunedin, New Zealand, to create a Masters in Science Communication, in Science and Natural History Film-making. The two-year course takes up to 12 students a year, and is based on a year of course work, and a year making a commercial-length documentary.

== See also ==
- Nature documentary
- Natural history
