= TVNZ 2 =

New Zealand television channel

- Logo used since 2016
- Country: New Zealand
- Broadcast area: National

Programming
- Picture format: 1080i (HDTV)
- Timeshift service: TVNZ 2+1

Ownership
- Owner: TVNZ
- Sister channels: TVNZ 1 TVNZ 1+1; TVNZ Duke; TVNZ 2+1

History
- Launched: 30 June 1975; 51 years ago
- Former names: TV2 (1975–1976, 1995–2016); South Pacific Television (1976–1980); Television Two (1980–1982); Television 2 (1982–1987); Network Two (1987–1989); Channel 2 (1989–1995)

Links
- Webcast: Watch live (NZ only)
- Website: tvnz.co.nz/livetv/tvnz-2

Availability

Terrestrial
- DVB 64-QAM on band IV

TVNZ 2 (informally called Two and TV2) is the second New Zealand television channel owned and operated by the state-owned broadcaster Television New Zealand (TVNZ). It targets a younger audience than its sister channel, TVNZ 1. TVNZ 2's lineup consists of dramas, comedies, and reality TV shows. A small number are produced in New Zealand which are either of a comedic, soap opera or reality nature, with rest of the program lineup taken from international catalogues, mostly from Canada and the United States.

TVNZ 2 is New Zealand's second-oldest television channel, formed in 1975 following the break-up of the New Zealand Broadcasting Corporation into Radio New Zealand, Television One and Television Two. It began broadcasting on 30 June 1975, and for most of the 1970s was known as South Pacific Television. In 1980, it became a part of TVNZ when South Pacific Television and Television One merged, and reverted to the name TV2. The channel was renamed TVNZ 2 in October 2016.

The channel is broadcast on the government owned Kordia terrestrial network as well as on one of the two Kordia satellite transponders, which is included in channel packages on the Freeview and Sky platforms. Sky also make the channel available on one of their own satellite transponders.

== History ==
=== Background ===
Following the establishment of the national network in 1969 and the first colour tests a little later, the New Zealand Broadcasting Corporation began studying plans for a second channel. One of the suggestions was to make it a commercial-free operation; it even invited Huw Weldon from the BBC to support evidence from like-minded broadcasters around the world that already had two channels. In February 1972, ahead of the elections, the New Zealand government announced its plans to launch a bid for a second channel, which piqued NZBC's interest, however it was facing competition from the Independent Television Corporation, which planned to turn the second channel into a commercial outlet from launch. Formal hearings took place in October, creating tensions between the two bids.

In 1973, with the impending dissolution of the NZBC, a second television channel was announced. It would inherit the studios and facilities of AKTV2 and CHTV3 and would broadcast in the coverage areas of both stations in an initial phase. In December, it was expected that the channel would become operational in mid-1975 and an inaugural meeting would take place in January 1974. At the time, the new corporation lacked equipment, staff, finance, transmission and programmes.

Allan Martin was appointed channel director during 1974; in October of that year, he announced that TV2 would be operational by June or July 1975. Its style was "quality mixed with enterprise and entertainment". It would have greater differences in terms of style than the homogenous NZBC network, which would become TV One from 1 April 1975. On 8 December, equipment for two transmitters, manufactured by Marconi, arrived on a chartered aircraft in Auckland. The first transmitter was set to be installed at Waiatarua, to cover Auckland, followed by a second in Te Aroha, to cover Waikato.

=== 1975–1980: TV2 South Pacific Television ===
TV2 was formed following the dissolution of the New Zealand Broadcasting Corporation on 1 April 1975, with the corporation splitting into Radio New Zealand and two television channels: Television One and Television Two. Whereas Television One took over WNTV1 in Wellington and DNTV2 in Dunedin as well as the existing channel frequencies, Television Two took over AKTV2 in Auckland and CHTV3 in Christchurch, broadcasting on channel 4 in Auckland and channel 8 in Christchurch.

TV2 began broadcasting in Auckland at 1 pm on Monday 30 June 1975. Broadcasting began in Christchurch five hours later at 6 pm, due to extra time being needed to fix an aerial fault at the city's Sugarloaf transmitter. The opening weekend saw the country's first telethon, raising over $485,000 for the St John Ambulance Service.

As there was only one national link at the time, and Television One had priority, TV2 used the link overnight to feed the next day's programmes between Auckland and Christchurch so they could be broadcast simultaneously. During its first year, TV2 introduced the Goodnight Kiwi cartoon for its closedown, although it was not until 1980 that it assumed its most recognised form.

TV2 began broadcasting in the Waikato on 1 September 1975. TV2 began broadcasting in Wellington on 24 November 1975, after the city's infamous winds hampered aerial installation at the Mount Kaukau transmitter. Coverage was extended to Dunedin and Invercargill on 28 June 1976.

The channel had branded itself as "TV2 South Pacific Television" since its launch. In 1976, it dropped the TV2 moniker and was renamed simply South Pacific Television. This also reduced confusion in Auckland and Dunedin where Television One broadcast on channel 2 (TV2 broadcast on channel 4 in both centres). Along with Television One and Radio New Zealand, South Pacific Television became part of the Broadcasting Corporation of New Zealand (BCNZ) in 1977.

In February 1979, the National Government announced it would the amalgamate Television One and South Pacific Television under a single administration. South Pacific Television closed down for the last time at 12:15 am on 16 February 1980, after airing a two-hour farewell special.

South Pacific Television was known for producing original TV series, with titles such as Children of Fire Mountain and Hunter’s Gold ranking among its top international sellers.

=== 1980–1987: Television 2 (TV2) ===
Television Two relaunched at 12:00 noon on 16 February 1980 under the administration of Television New Zealand, with the promise of 'complementary programming'. On 2 September 1980, TV Two's transmitter network in the South Island aired an adult scene after closedown, featuring a woman taking off her bra. It was later revealed to be a signal coming from Brisbane from freak weather conditions, which was likely a picture without sound.

The National government debated selling off TV2 to a private enterprise in 1983, but this did not happen. In 1987, Television New Zealand started to move away from complementary programming, with TV2 emphasising entertainment while TV One would emphasise information-based programming.

=== 1987–1995: Network Two and Channel 2 ===
John Barningham was appointed its director of programming in September 1986, having returned from a stint abroad as a theatre director in Melbourne. A goal was set to reduce complementary outputs with TV One and giving the channel its own identity again, but without the internal competition that existed as South Pacific Television. By mid-1987, TV2 was rebranded as "Network Two", and in 1989 was rebranded as "Channel 2".

The Simpsons had its New Zealand premiere on Channel 2 on 4 January 1991, the first episode shown was "Some Enchanted Evening"; it became the third-most watched television programme that week, recording 737,000 viewers, just behind One Network News and New Zealand's Funniest Home Videos.

In late 1991, Channel 2 introduced 24-hour television overnight which lasted from 20 December 1991 to the end of February 1992.

The channel sought to offer a "Kiwi profile" for 1993. Local programmes for the new season included game show Clash of the Codes and the second season of Marlin Bay. Face the Music moved to a 6:30pm slot, directly preceding Shortland Street.

24-hour programming was reintroduced by mid-1993, initially on Fridays and Saturdays. By mid-1994, 24-hour programming on Channel 2 was extended to Thursdays to Sundays, and on 19 October 1994, Channel 2 began broadcasting non-stop, 24 hours a day, after the success of late night programming Thursdays to Sundays during winter.

=== 1995–2016: TV2 ===
In early 1995, Channel 2 reverted to its old name, TV2, which was the name most viewers referred to.

At 6am on 2 February 2007, the channel introduced a new logo, whereupon the existing 2 logo (originally blue) turned green inside a purple circle with a red border. Andrew Shaw used said that the branding would reflect its local identity. In line with TVNZ's repositioning in mid-1997, a new raft of local shows were unveiled, as well as a new look. The increase in such productions would also solidify its ratings performance in the 7:30pm-8:30pm timeslot, while also increasing the amount of local faces on screen and jobs in the media industry.

On 2 February 2003, the channel introduced a new brand identity, using the slogan "2 in the neighbourhood", conceived by Saatchi & Saatchi, and with idents filmed entirely in Auckland depicting a neighbourhood with TV2's stars of the time, accompanied by The Neighbourhood by Sisters Underground. The logo was amended, replacing the circle behind the 2 with a "glass marble", as described by network bosses, in five separate colours. TV2 picked up SportsCafe from Sky 1 in 2003 in order to attract a wider audience. That same year, it ended the overnight programming block M2, dedicated to national and international music, after eighteen months on air, which was criticised by local musicians. Satellite Pictures, M2's producer, continued making Squeeze and Space for the channel.

A former logo, used until 30 September 2016.

On 22 September 2007, TV2 went into 16:9 widescreen on Freeview 24 hours a day. For the 2008 season, the channel ditched the Sunday Premiere Movie after twenty years and moved it to Tuesdays as Tuesday Blockbuster, complementary to the entertainment offers on TV One. Saturday night movies remained unchanged. Due to the WGA strike, its airing of new episodes of Lost was now limited to days after the original US airing of each episode. Questiones ad to why it was supposed to mirror new episodes of Heroes airing closer to the original US date on TV3, Jane Wilson said that it was "unlikely" that more series would follow this pattern on TV2.

On 2 September 2010, TV2 changed from broadcasting in 720p high definition to 1080i.

On New Year's Day 2012, TV2 introduced a new look graphics package with a new theme song for the network. At the same time, the TV2 digital on-screen graphic logo moved from the top right hand corner of the screen to the bottom right hand corner of the screen, for the first time since 2003.

From 19 August 2013, TV2 reacquired broadcast rights for Home and Away, after outbidding TV3. In 2014, TV2 unveiled a new set of idents without using special effects, in which air cannons sent 8,000 copies of the channel's logo, in six idents featuring live-action scenes involving actors from its local shows.

On 12 September 2016, TV2 started airing Sesame Street, which had been off air from New Zealand screens for two months, following the closure of Four in July, as well as concerns from parents. The move came as an about-face for the network, as, in July, the rights were deemed expensive and TVNZ was initially not willing to buy the licence. The network did not reveal financial details of the transaction due to commercial issues.

=== 2016–present: TVNZ 2 ===
On 1 October 2016, the channel was renamed TVNZ 2, ditching the 2 numeral in use since 1995 and maintaining the purple colour.

The channel will cease airing The Big Bang Theory reruns effective 30 November 2026 (with the last episode being The Valentino Submergence from season 9, after eighteen years on the channel, with the series becoming exclusive to HBO Max with effect from that date. In its timeslot, it will be replaced by The Goldbergs.

== Programming ==
Long-running TVNZ 2 programmes include children's show What Now (since 1981; on TVNZ 2 since 1989) and soap opera Shortland Street (since 1992).

== TVNZ 2+1 ==
TVNZ 2+1
- Broadcast area: National

Programming
- Picture format: 576i (SDTV)

Ownership
- Owner: Television New Zealand
- Sister channels: TVNZ 1 TVNZ 2 TVNZ Duke; TVNZ 2+1

History
- Launched: 30 September 2007; 19 years ago
- Replaced: TVNZ U
- Former names: TVNZ 6 (2007-2011); TVNZ U (2011-2013); TV2+1 (2013–2016)

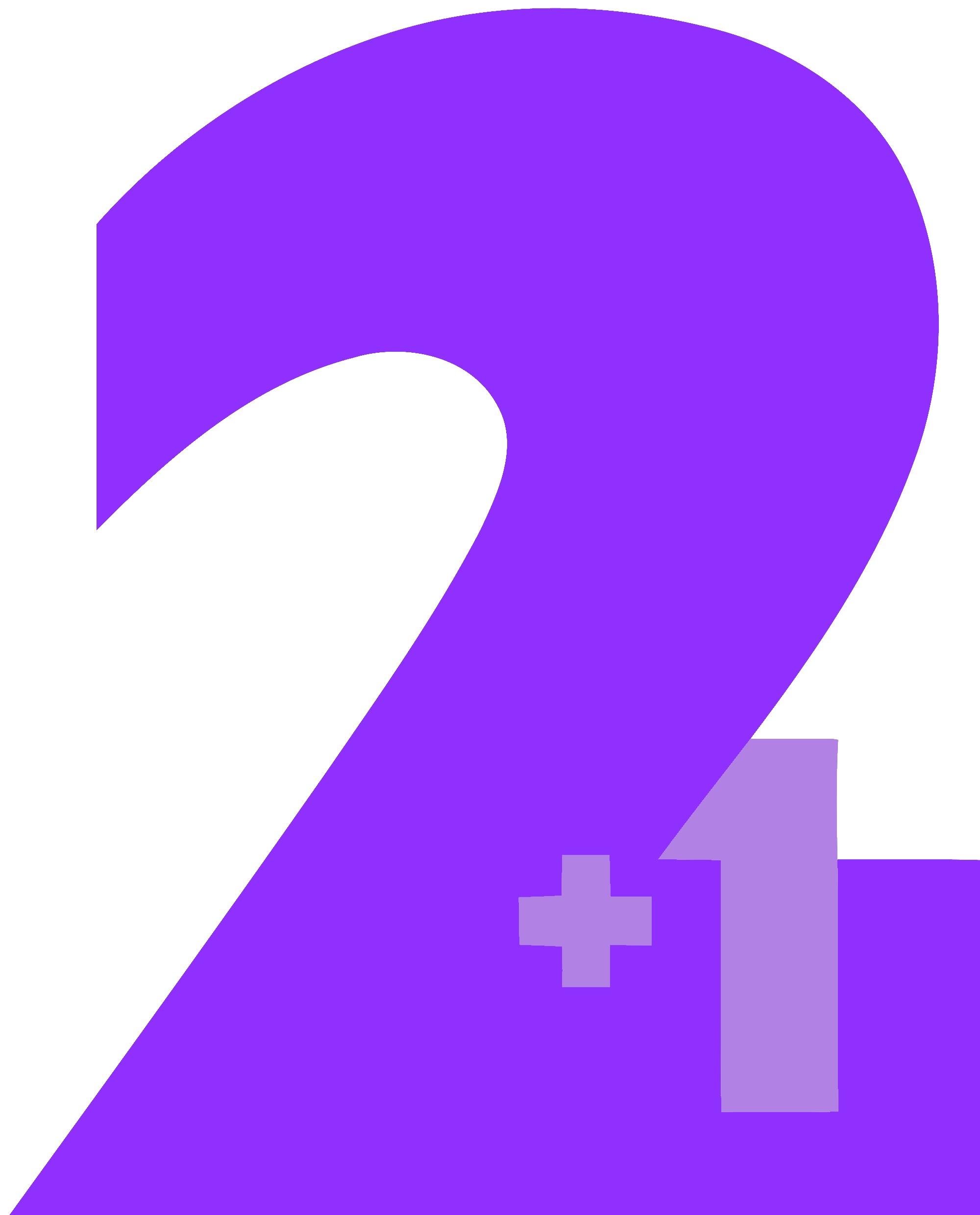
A former logo, used until October 2016.

TVNZ 2+1 was launched to Freeview and Sky customers on 1 September 2013 as TV2+1. It is a channel with a one-hour time shift of the Auckland TVNZ 2 feed. The channel is available on channel 7 on Freeview and 502 on Sky. This channel replaced U, which was an interactive youth-orientated channel. When the channel was launched, TV One Plus 1 (now TVNZ 1+1) moved to Channel 6 on Freeview, while TV2+1 took over channel 7. It was rebranded as TVNZ 2+1 on 1 October 2016. The channel remained in the same position after the 21 March 2022 channel changes.

=== Home Learning TV ===
Home Learning TV was launched on 15 April 2020, and broadcast on the channel from 9 am to 3 pm on weekdays instead of a timeshift of TVNZ 2. From 15 June, it was shifted to TVNZ 2, broadcasting from 8:15 am to 9 am on weekdays. It was part of the government's efforts to encourage continued educational engagement during the nationwide lockdown that had closed all New Zealand schools. The content was hosted by various New Zealand educators.

During the 2021 lockdown, it moved to TVNZ Duke +1.
