= AKTV2 =

Local TV station in Auckland, New Zealand

- Country: New Zealand
- Broadcast area: Auckland and northern North Island
- Network: NZBC TV (1969–75)

Programming
- Language: English
- Picture format: 576i black & white (1960–73); 576i PAL colour (1973–75)

Ownership
- Owner: New Zealand Broadcasting Corporation
- Sister channels: WNTV1, CHTV3, DNTV2

History
- Launched: 1 June 1960
- Closed: 31 March 1975
- Replaced by: TV One

Availability

Terrestrial
- Analogue: Channel 2 (Auckland)

AKTV2 was a television station in Auckland, New Zealand, established by the then New Zealand Broadcasting Corporation in 1960. It was the first television station in New Zealand.

== History ==
The then-New Zealand Broadcasting Service received equipment for an experimental television station in January 1959 on VHF channel 2, broadcasting on the roof of the building used by sister radio station 1YA at Shortland Street. It faced informal competition from the Bell Radio-Television Corporation, which broadcast its own service, initially as a closed-circuit operation before being tested on VHF channel 1. Experimental broadcasts from AKTV2 began on 23 February, but were halted during the second week due to the rise in public interest. These broadcasts resumed on 18 May, broadcasting for two hours each Monday evening. The Department of Industries and Commerce published a booklet, The Economics of Television, on 28 July, suggesting ten television stations, where four major centres would have two stations and six smaller centres would only receive one. After Walter Nash was interviewed by the BBC in November 1959, he announced that New Zealand would begin regular television transmissions within twelve months; this was formally announced on 28 January 1960. Bell's experimental broadcasts continued until 1 September 1960, when they were halted.

NZBS Television, by means of AKTV2, started broadcasting on 1 June 1960 at 7:30pm. With an initial coverage area limited to Auckland, the first night included British series The Adventures of Robin Hood, an interview with a British ballerina visiting New Zealand and a performance by the Howard Morrison Quartet. The first night lasted only three hours. No footage of the station's opening night is known to survive as the said footage is known to have been destroyed. At launch time, the station had a staff of thirteen. During the NZBS days, AKTV2 used a photograph of Rangitoto as its identification chart.

On 4 April 1961, television advertising was introduced. With this, NZBS-AKTV increased its airtime to twenty-eight hours a week.

AKTV2 used the Shortland Street studios heavily until the introduction of Avalon at the Hutt Valley. Studio One was commissioned at Shortland Street/Gus Fisher in 1966, at the time, the largest television studio in the country. Music shows produced from these studios included In the Groove, which was on air as early as 1962, from a studio "no bigger than a living room" (Studio One had not been built yet) downstairs in its facilities.

By 1969, AKTV2 was known on air as Northern Television. Tex Morton was its operations supervisor. Its nightly news and magazine programme, Town and Around, was consequently renamed This Day the following year.

== Aftermath ==
In 1975, the NZBC was dissolved and AKTV2's facilities were used by South Pacific Television, initially operating under the commercial name Television Two (TV2), who also took over CHTV3. TV One inherited WNTV1 and DNTV2. TV2's broadcasts began on 30 June 1975. TV2 inherited the Shortland Street studios, the local soap Shortland Street, which first aired on that channel in 1992, was named after the former building and was originally set to be shot there, but filming had to be relocated as it lacked the capacity.

When Television New Zealand was created from the merger of the two BCNZ television companies, TV One restored local news, using the name Top Half. In 1995, when TVNZ's operations had mostly moved to Auckland, it housed the Horizon Pacific Television station Auckland Television (ATV), which also produced local news. The station closed in 1997, as TVNZ thought that the network was no longer economically viable.

Auckland serves as the main hub for TVNZ since October 1980, taking over from Wellington and Avalon.
