= South Pacific Television =

Former television channel in New Zealand

- South Pacific Television logo, 1976-1980
- Type: Public
- Industry: Television channel
- Predecessor: New Zealand Broadcasting Corporation
- Founded: December 1976; 49 years ago
- Defunct: February 15, 1980; 46 years ago
- Fate: Renamed as Television New Zealand
- Successor: Television New Zealand
- Headquarters: Auckland, New Zealand
- Area served: New Zealand

South Pacific Television (SPTV) was a television channel in New Zealand, which operated between 1975 and 1980. It was established in 1974 and started broadcasting on 1 July 1975. It temporarily used the TV2 brand name until 1976, when the trade name of the channel became official. It merged with Television One in 1980, forming a single corporation for both channels, Television New Zealand, consequently, it reverted to its previous name Television Two.

== History ==
South Pacific Television was a name considered for the second channel in 1974, but had to adopt TV2 as its temporary name once the company found out that the name they planned to use was already taken. They began using the South Pacific Television name as a trade name instead. The appearance of the name on an edition of the NZBC programme Sing in January 1975 caused an investigation on the subject, and it was believed that the insertion of the phrase "South Pacific Television, Auckland" was inserted when it was screened, since it was not included in the final videotape version. An NZBC spokesman thought it to be an "accident or a silly joke". The name was subsequently adopted as part of its corporate identity, as part of the corporation's letterhead, whereas the name TV2 was a temporary measure until the network was fully-established.

The channel, then known under the temporary name of TV2, first went to air on 30 June 1975. It was the second national government television channel to be established in the country that year, after Television One went to air on 1 April, replacing the former New Zealand Broadcasting Corporation's TV service.

In its first week, the network held New Zealand's first Telethon in aid of the St. John's Ambulance. It raised $593,878.

The channel could only be received in Auckland and Christchurch when it first went to air. Broadcast hours in Christchurch were initially limited while technicians rectified a faulty aerial at the city's Sugarloaf transmitter. It was another three months before the Waikato and Bay of Plenty got coverage and by late November, the channel was available in Wellington before spreading throughout the rest of the country. As consequence of picking up two of the former NZBC TV infrastructures, it inherited AKTV2 and CHTV3's production facilities. The station carried advertising five days a week, taking days off on Fridays and Sundays.

The channel covered the South Pacific Festival of the Arts held in Rotorua in March 1976 with several half-hour pre-recorded programmes featuring several traditional dances from the broader region. SPTV also co-operated with the BBC for the footage.

By August 1976, TV2 started phasing out its birth name in favour of South Pacific Television (SPTV) to distinguish itself from the former NZBC channel, and to prevent confusion from other TV2s in the world, which SPTV's head of presentation Barry O'Brien found out that there were at least eight stations using the name. It also reduced confusion in Auckland and Dunedin where Television One broadcast on channel 2 (TV2 broadcast on channel 4 in both centres). Overseas marketing was also being boosted and its new drama series Hunter's Gold was marketed under the new name. O'Brien ruled out a removal of the name TV2, as it appeared in the Broadcasting Act. Programme publicity and the station's switchboards now used South Pacific Television. In September, it advertised the premiere of Hunter's Gold in Auckland newspapers. The series was the channel's most expensive production to date, costing NZ$326,000 to produce, and hoped for a success in overseas sales.

In 1977, broadcasting hours were cut on both channels and as a result SPTV lost 16 hours of broadcast time a week, forcing the channel to begin its daily broadcasts at 3pm (except weekends, where SPTV opened transmission at midday). That year, approval was made for expanding its coverage area into Gisborne, several years ahead of plan.

Improved coverage for all of Canterbury started on 14 November 1977 after improving its transmitter at Mount Sugarloaf.

Channel funding was cut for Television One and handed over to SPTV in a move that bewildered some over at Television One. The effects of the cuts saw programme output on SPTV increase.

== Fate ==
It was decided in 1979 by the National Government that the channels would be amalgamated under an administration which would end the competition that reared its head in 1975.

SPTV's final day of transmissions was 15 February 1980. The final programme was a two-hour farewell special, and the channel closed down at 12:15am on the morning of 16 February.

The next day, 16 February 1980, Television One and SPTV were dissolved and became Television One and Television Two, under the newly formed Television New Zealand (TVNZ). A number of SPTV's programmes moved across to the new networks.

== List of programmes ==
South Pacific Television was known for its TV series, which, during the period between 1977 and 1980, were exported to 34 countries. The cumulative sale of its exports amassed over NZ$1 million during the aforementioned period. Its most popular exports were Hunter's Gold, Ngaio Marsh Mystery Theatre, Gather Your Dreams and Children of Fire Mountain.

=== Domestic ===
==== Children's ====
- (New Zealand) Chic Chat
- (New Zealand) Chicaboom
- (New Zealand) Child's Play
- (New Zealand) Children of Fire Mountain
- (New Zealand) Good Time Show with Tracy
- (New Zealand) Hey, Hey It's Andy
- (New Zealand) Hunter's Gold
- Romper Room (New Zealand version)

==== Comedy ====
- (New Zealand) A Week of It
- (New Zealand) Hudson and Halls
- (New Zealand) Something to Look Forward to

==== Drama ====
- (New Zealand) Castaways
- (New Zealand) Colour Scheme
- (New Zealand) Died in the Wool
- (New Zealand) Hunter's Gold
- (New Zealand) Ngaio Marsh Theatre
- (New Zealand) Opening Night
- (New Zealand) Radio Waves
- (New Zealand) (United Kingdom) The Mackenzie Affair
- (New Zealand) Vintage Murder

==== Entertainment ====
- (New Zealand) The Club Show
- (New Zealand) Opportunity Knocks
- (New Zealand) Top of the World
- (New Zealand) Telethon

==== Factual & Lifestyle ====
- (New Zealand) Access
- (New Zealand) Book Review
- (New Zealand) Butcher's Hook
- (New Zealand) Child Health
- (New Zealand) Church in Action
- (New Zealand) Farming Today
- (New Zealand) Kaleidoscope
- (New Zealand) Looking Your Best
- (New Zealand) Pacific Viewpoint
- (New Zealand) Pet Life
- (New Zealand) Police Five
- (New Zealand) Sew Easy
- (New Zealand) Stars on Sunday
- (New Zealand) Sunday's Child
- (New Zealand) Talk Cars
- (New Zealand) A Taste of the Orient
- (New Zealand) That's Entertainment
- (New Zealand) You and the Law
- (New Zealand) Yours for the Asking

==== News and Current Affairs ====
- (New Zealand) Eye Witness
- (New Zealand) Forum
- (New Zealand) News at Six
- (New Zealand) News at Ten
- (New Zealand) News Stand
- (New Zealand) Weekend Edition News
- (New Zealand) World Watch

==== Sport ====
- (New Zealand) On the Mat
- (New Zealand) Saturday Night Rugby
- (New Zealand) Sportsworld

=== Overseas ===
==== Children's ====
- (United States) Batman
- (United States) Captain Caveman
- (United States) Clutch Cargo
- (United Kingdom) Dominic
- (United Kingdom) Doctor Who
- (United States) The Flintstones
- (United Kingdom) Michael Bentine's Potty Time
- (United States) The New Fred and Barney Show
- (United States) The Quick Draw McGraw Show
- (United Kingdom) Rainbow
- (United Kingdom) Rogue's Rock
- (Canada) The Undersea Adventures of Captain Nemo

==== Comedy ====
- (United States) Alice
- (United States) The Bob Newhart Show
- (United States) The Brady Bunch
- (United Kingdom) Dave Allen at Large
- (United Kingdom) Doctor at Large
- (United Kingdom) Get Some In!
- (United States) Eight Is Enough
- (United States) Fantasy Island
- (United States) Gidget
- (United Kingdom) The Goodies
- (United Kingdom) The Liver Birds
- (United States) The Love Boat
- (United Kingdom) The Mike and Bernie Show
- (United Kingdom) Mixed Blessings
- (United States) My Three Sons
- (United Kingdom) Odd Man Out
- (United Kingdom) Oh No It's Selwyn Froggitt
- (United Kingdom) Please Sir!
- (United Kingdom) Porridge
- (United States) Soap
- (United Kingdom) The Stanley Baxter Moving Picture Show
- (United Kingdom) Sykes
- (United States) Taxi
- (United States) The Tony Randall Show
- (United States) Welcome Back, Kotter

==== Drama ====
- (Australia) Against the Wind
- (United Kingdom) All Creatures Great and Small
- (United Kingdom) The Brothers
- (United Kingdom) Clayhanger
- (United States) Dan August
- (United Kingdom) Danger UXB
- (United States) The Duchess of Duke Street
- (United States) Emergency One
- (United States) Family (1976 TV series)
- (United States) Fantasy Island
- (United States) Hawaii Five-O
- (United States) The High Chaparral
- (United States) Kojak
- (United States) The Life and Times of Grizzly Adams
- (United States) Little House on the Prairie
- (United States) Man from Atlantis
- (United Kingdom) New Scotland Yard
- (United Kingdom) The Persuaders!
- (United Kingdom) The Professionals
- (United States) The Rookies
- (United States) Search for Tomorrow
- (United Kingdom) Softly, Softly: Task Force
- (United Kingdom) Spearhead
- (United States) Spencer's Pilots
- (Australia) The Sullivans
- (United Kingdom) Spearhead
- (United Kingdom) Within These Walls
- (United States) The Wild Wild West
- (United States) Wonder Woman

==== Entertainment ====
- (United States) Dinah!
- (United Kingdom) The Tom O'Connor Show

==== Factual ====
- (United States) The Incredible World of Adventure
- (United States) Wild Kingdom
