= New Zealand Broadcasting Corporation =

Defunct New Zealand broadcasting company

- Type: Publicly owned company
- Industry: Broadcasting
- Founded: 1 June 1960
- Defunct: 1 April 1975
- Fate: Dissolved and reformed
- Successor: Radio New Zealand; Television One; TV2
- Headquarters: Auckland, New Zealand
- Area served: New Zealand
- Products: Black and white television
- Owner: New Zealand Government

The New Zealand Broadcasting Corporation (NZBC) was a state-owned company established by the New Zealand Government in 1962. Under the Broadcasting Act 1976, the NZBC was restructured as the Broadcasting Corporation of New Zealand (BCNZ). The NZBC was dissolved on 1 April 1975 and replaced by three separate entities: Radio New Zealand, Television One, and Television Two, which was later renamed South Pacific Television. In 1980, the two television channels merged to form Television New Zealand, while Radio New Zealand continued as a standalone organisation.

== History ==
=== Early years (1960–1962) ===
The NZBC had its headquarters in Broadcasting House on Bowen Street, Wellington, behind the parliamentary buildings. Construction of the building began in 1959, and it was opened in 1963. After 1975, the premises were occupied by Radio New Zealand.

At 7:30 pm on 1 June 1960, New Zealand's first television channel, AKTV2, began broadcasting in Auckland from the NZBC building at 74 Shortland Street. The building had previously housed the public radio station 1YA and is now home to the University of Auckland's Gus Fisher Gallery. The channel was originally owned and operated by the New Zealand Broadcasting Service.

With the passage of the Broadcasting Corporation Act 1961, the New Zealand Broadcasting Corporation was established, with F. J. Llewellyn appointed chairman. The Corporation formally came into operation on 1 April 1962. During the Bill's passage through the House of Representatives, provision was made for privately owned broadcasting stations, despite strong opposition from the Labour Party.

=== Expansion of services ===
On taking office, the Corporation assumed responsibility for 35 radio stations and four television stations. By November 1964, sound radio licences exceeded 600,000, while television licences totalled 275,000. Annual income exceeded NZ£5,000,000, of which more than NZ£250,000 was paid in taxation.

Initially, the four television stations were not linked, and programmes had to be physically shipped between centres. Urgent news footage could be transmitted between two stations on each island using Post Office Telephone Department (now Chorus) coaxial toll lines, but this was too costly for regular programming.

=== The Wahine disaster (1968) ===
The limitations of the unlinked facilities were highlighted on 10 April 1968, when the inter-island ferry TEV Wahine sank in Wellington Harbour. Newscasts from WNTV1 had to be transmitted over Post Office lines to AKTV2 in Auckland. Severe weather disrupted shipping and flights for more than 24 hours, delaying delivery of footage to the South Island.

The first video of the disaster reached Blenheim, where a local reporter filmed the broadcast directly from a private television set. The exposed film was rushed to Christchurch for development and then transmitted via CHTV3 and DNTV2. This Blenheim recording is believed to be the only surviving footage from the first day of the disaster.

=== Apollo 11 and network development (1969) ===
By July 1969, during the Apollo 11 mission, the North and South Islands each had microwave network capability, but the Cook Strait link had not yet been completed, and New Zealand still lacked an international broadcast connection. Footage of the Moon landing was recorded at the Australian Broadcasting Commission's ABN-2 in Sydney, flown by an RNZAF English Electric Canberra to Wellington, and broadcast on WNTV1.

To deliver the footage to the South Island, the NZBC positioned one of its first outside broadcasting vans to beam the signal across Cook Strait to a receiving dish, from where it was relayed through the South Island network. The Cook Strait link was completed later in 1969. The first NZBC Network News was broadcast on 3 November 1969, read by Dougal Stevenson.

=== Microwave network ===
The NZBC's national television network initially used a combination of microwave links and off-air relay links. During network broadcasts, stations switched between feeds using cue signals embedded in the picture signal. Viewers briefly saw a black screen while an identifying letter (for example, “W” for Wellington) was transmitted in the top-right corner of the image.

=== Satellite communications (1971) ===
With the opening of the Warkworth satellite station in 1971, New Zealand gained international broadcast capability. The first live satellite transmission received was the Melbourne Cup on 2 November 1971.

=== Introduction of colour television (1973–1974) ===
For its first 13 years, NZBC television was broadcast only in black and white. Colour television, using the phase alternating line (PAL) system, was introduced on 31 October 1973, in preparation for the 1974 British Commonwealth Games, held in Christchurch. Due to limited facilities, only four of the ten sports—swimming, diving, athletics and boxing—were broadcast in colour.

== Reorganisation and breakup ==
The introduction of a second television channel in 1975 led to a major reorganisation of broadcasting in New Zealand. On 1 April 1975, the NZBC was dissolved and replaced by three separate state-owned corporations: Television One, Television Two, and Radio New Zealand.

The existing NZBC television service became Television One (TV One), based at the Avalon Television Centre in Lower Hutt, which was officially opened on 17 March 1975. TV One began transmission on 1 April 1975, using the WNTV1 and DNTV2 studios along with existing channel frequencies.

The new channel, Television Two (TV2), launched later in the year on 30 June 1975. It was based at the former AKTV2 studios on Shortland Street in Auckland and the CHTV3 studios in Christchurch, and broadcast on newly allocated frequencies.

== Television New Zealand ==
In 1980, Television One and South Pacific Television (by then once again operating as Television Two) were merged to form a single organisation, Television New Zealand (TVNZ).

== See also ==
- Television in New Zealand
