= New Zealand Radio Awards =

Annual awards of the New Zealand radio industry

NZ Radio & Podcast Awards
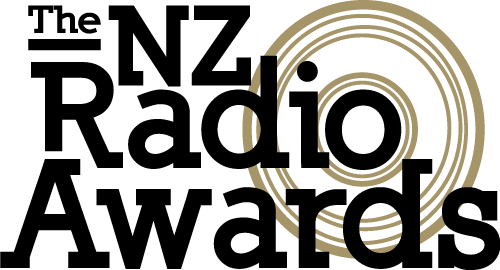
- Awarded for: Excellence in radio broadcasting
- Presented by: Radio Broadcasters Association
- First award: 1978
- Website: radioawards.co.nz

The NZ Radio & Podcast Awards (Formerly the New Zealand Radio Awards) are the annual awards of the New Zealand radio industry. Organised by the Radio Broadcasters Association, the awards recognise excellence in commercial and non-commercial radio broadcasting, in the form of programming, personalities, news and sports reporting, creativity and production quality. New Zealand radio stations, radio staff, advertising agencies and production houses are eligible to enter the awards.

The awards began in 1978, with the beginning of deregulation of the radio industry and the emergence of new independent broadcasters under the third National government of Rob Muldoon. Non-commercial and commercial networks have competed for a range of awards recognising both public service and commercial success. Special categories have also been developed to recognise Māori broadcasting and programmes for ethnic minorities, particularly on Iwi Radio Network and Access Radio Network stations.

== Awards ==
Below is a summation of some of the awards presented each year, from 2011 onwards.

Awards	Best Newsreader	Best Music Breakfast Show		Best Music Non-Breakfast Host or Team		Best Talk Presenter/s	Best Talkback Presenter/s	Ref.
Awards	Best Newsreader	Network	Regional	Network	Regional	Best Talk Presenter/s	Best Talkback Presenter/s	Ref.
2024 New Zealand Radio & Podcast Awards	Niva Retimanu	Carl Fletcher, Vaughan Smith, Hayley Sproull, Carwen Jones, Jared Pickstock, Shannon Trim	Angela 'Flash' Gordon, Tauha 'Toast' Te Kani, John Markby, Tania Burgess, Christian Boston	Duncan Heyde, Jay Reeve, Tiegan Lilley, Lee Weir, Brad King, Jack Honeybone	Bevan Chapman, Rodger Clamp, David Rybinski	Mike Hosking, Sam Carran, Sydney Epps, Glenn Hart	Marcus Lush, Dan Goodwin	
2024 New Zealand Radio & Podcast Awards	Niva Retimanu	ZM's Fletch, Vaughan & Hayley	The Northland Breakfast Club with John, Flash and Toast	Rock Drive with Jay and Dunc	Bevan for Breakfast	The Mike Hosking Breakfast	Marcus Lush Nights	
2024 New Zealand Radio & Podcast Awards	Newstalk ZB	ZM	More FM Northland	The Rock	More FM Gisborne & Wairoa	Newstalk ZB	Newstalk ZB	
2023 New Zealand Radio Awards	Niva Retimanu	Carl Fletcher, Vaughan Smith, Hayley Sproull, Anna Henvest, Carwen Jones, Jared Pickstock	John Markby, Angela 'Flash' Gordon, Tauha 'Toast' Te Kani, Tania Burgess	Jay-Jay Feeney, Paul Flynn, David Rybinski, George Smith, Matthew Pledger, Amy Collett	Amber Russell, Hiliary Schroeder	Mike Hosking, Michael Allan, Sam Carran, Glenn Hart	Marcus Lush, Dan Goodwin	
2023 New Zealand Radio Awards	Niva Retimanu	ZM's Fletch, Vaughan & Hayley	Northland's Breakfast Club with John, Flash and Toast	Jay-Jay & Flynny	Amber Russell	The Mike Hosking Breakfast	Marcus Lush Nights	
2023 New Zealand Radio Awards	Newstalk ZB	ZM	More FM Northland	More FM	More FM Canterbury	Newstalk ZB	Newstalk ZB	
2022 New Zealand Radio Awards	Niva Retimanu	Carl Fletcher, Vaughan Smith, Megan Papas, Anna Henvest, Sarah Mount, Jared Pickstock, Carwen Jones, Hayley Sproull	John Markby, Angela Gordon, Tauha Te Kani, Tania Burgess, Christian Boston	Steph Monks	Dave Nicholas	Heather du Plessis-Allan	Marcus Lush	
2022 New Zealand Radio Awards	Niva Retimanu	ZM's Fletch, Vaughan & Megan	John, Flash & Toast	The Edge Workday	Dave Nicholas	Heather du Plessis-Allan Drive	Marcus Lush Nights	
2022 New Zealand Radio Awards	Newstalk ZB	ZM	More FM Northland	The Edge Network	The Hits Auckland	Newstalk ZB	Newstalk ZB	
2021 New Zealand Radio Awards	Nicola Wright	Carl Fletcher, Vaughan Smith, Megan Papas, Anna Henvest, Sarah Mount, Jared Pickstock	Callum Procter, Patrina Roche	Jay Reeve, Duncan Heyde, Jeremy Pickford, Jack Honeybone	Will Johnston	Lisa Owen	Marcus Lush	
2021 New Zealand Radio Awards	Nicola Wright	ZM's Fletch, Vaughan & Megan	Callum & P	The Rock Drive with Jay and Dunc	Will Johnston	Checkpoint	Marcus Lush Nights	
2021 New Zealand Radio Awards	RNZ National	ZM	The Hits Dunedin/Southland	The Rock	The Hits Bay Of Plenty	RNZ National	Newstalk ZB	
2020 New Zealand Radio Awards	Niva Retimanu	Carl Fletcher, Vaughan Smith, Megan Papas, Caitlin Marett, James Johnston, Anna Henvest	Callum Procter, Patrina Roche	Jay Reeve, Duncan Heyde, Jeremy Pickford, Jack Honeybone	Brent Burridge & Jacque Tucker	Mike Hosking	Marcus Lush	
2020 New Zealand Radio Awards	Niva Retimanu	ZM's Fletch, Vaughan & Megan	Callum & P	The Rock Drive Home with Jay and Dunc	Breakfast with Brent and Jacque	The Mike Hosking Breakfast	Marcus Lush Nights	
2020 New Zealand Radio Awards	Newstalk ZB	ZM	The Hits Dunedin/Southland	The Rock	More FM Rodney	Newstalk ZB	Newstalk ZB	
2019 New Zealand Radio Awards	Raylene Ramsay	Carl Fletcher, Vaughan Smith, Megan Papas, Caitlin Marett, James Johnston, Anna Henvest	Callum Procter, Patrina Roche	Jono Pryor, Ben Boyce, Sharyn Casey, Dan Webby, Ryan Rathbone, Carl Thompson, Hamish Phipps	Dave Nicolas/Will Johnston (tie)	Mike Hosking	Marcus Lush	
2019 New Zealand Radio Awards	Raylene Ramsay	ZM's Fletch, Vaughan & Megan	Callum & P	Jono, Ben & Sharyn	Days with Dave Nicolas/Days with Will Johnston (tie)	The Mike Hosking Breakfast	Marcus Lush Nights	
2019 New Zealand Radio Awards	Newstalk ZB	ZM	The Hits Dunedin	The Edge	The Hits Auckland/Tauranga (tie)	Newstalk ZB	Newstalk ZB	
2018 New Zealand Radio Awards
2018 New Zealand Radio Awards	Niva Retimanu	Carl Fletcher, Vaughn Smith, Megan Papas, Caitlin Marett, James Johnston, Anna Henvest	John Markby, Angela 'Flash' Gordon, Tauha 'Toast' TeKani, Bryn Ingham	Thane Kirby, Duncan Heyde, Jeremy Pickford	Tauha 'Toast' TeKani	Mike Hosking	Marcus Lush	
2018 New Zealand Radio Awards	Niva Retimanu	ZM's Fletch, Vaughn & Megan	More FM Breakfast with John, Flash & Toast	The Rock Drive with Thane and Dunc	More FM Social Club with Toast	The Mike Hosking Breakfast	Marcus Lush Nights	
2018 New Zealand Radio Awards	Newstalk ZB	ZM	More FM Northland	The Rock	More FM Northland	Newstalk ZB	Newstalk ZB	
2017 New Zealand Radio Awards
2017 New Zealand Radio Awards	Niva Retimanu	Jay-Jay Feeney, Dominic Harvey, Clinton Randell, Kerry Gregory, Carl Thompson, Stephanie Munro, Stephanie Monks	Callum Procter, Patrina Roche	Jono Pryor, Ben Boyce, Dan Webby, Duncan Heyde, Bronwynn Bakker	Katrina Smith	Duncan Garner	Marcus Lush	
2017 New Zealand Radio Awards	Niva Retimanu	Jay-Jay, Dom and Randell	The Hits Dunedin Breakfast with Callum and P	Jono & Ben	The Easy Workday with Katrina Smith	RadioLIVE Drive with Duncan Garner	Marcus Lush Nights	
2017 New Zealand Radio Awards	Newstalk ZB	The Edge	The Hits Dunedin	The Rock	The Breeze Wellington	Radio Live	Newstalk ZB	
2016 New Zealand Radio Awards
2016 New Zealand Radio Awards	Bernadine Oliver-Kirby/Hilary Barry (tie)	Jay-Jay Feeney, Mike Puru, Dominic Harvey, Carl Thompson, Kerry Gregory, Sophie Hallwright	Callum Procter, Patrina Roche	Jono Pryor, Ben Boyce, Duncan Heyde, Daniel Webby, Bronwynn Bakker	Stu Smith	Paul Henry, Sarah Bristow	Leighton Smith, Carolyn Leaney	
2016 New Zealand Radio Awards	Bernadine Oliver-Kirby/Hilary Barry (tie)	Jay-Jay, Mike & Dom	The Hits Breakfast - Dunedin	Jono & Ben Drive	Stu Smith and the Easy Drive Home	Paul Henry	The Leighton Smith Show	
2016 New Zealand Radio Awards	Newstalk ZB/Radio Live (tie)	The Edge	The Hits Dunedin	The Rock	The Breeze Wellington	Radio Live	Newstalk ZB	
2015 New Zealand Radio Awards
2015 New Zealand Radio Awards	Hilary Barry	Simon Barnett, Gary McCormick	Callum Procter, Patrina Roche	Jono Pryor, Ben Boyce	Lana Searle, Jason Gunn	Mike Hosking	Leighton Smith	
2015 New Zealand Radio Awards	Hilary Barry	Si & Gary	Callum & P In The Morning	Jono & Ben - The Rock Drive	Lana & Jase	The Mike Hosking Breakfast	The Leighton Smith Show	
2015 New Zealand Radio Awards	Radio Live	More FM	The Hits Dunedin	The Rock	More FM Christchurch	Newstalk ZB	Newstalk ZB	
2014 New Zealand Radio Awards
2014 New Zealand Radio Awards	Hilary Barry	Jay-Jay Feeney, Mike Puru, Dom Harvey	Mike West, Gareth Pringle, Renee Pink	Robert Taylor, Jono Pryor	Blair Kiddey	Mike Hosking	Leighton Smith	
2014 New Zealand Radio Awards	Hilary Barry	The Edge Breakfast with Jay-Jay, Mike & Dom	Mike West in the Morning with Gareth & Renee	Robert and Jono	The Drive Home with Blair	The Mike Hosking Breakfast	The Leighton Smith Show	
2014 New Zealand Radio Awards	Radio Live	The Edge	More FM Manawatu	The Rock	More FM Nelson	Newstalk ZB	Newstalk ZB	
2013 New Zealand Radio Awards
2013 New Zealand Radio Awards	Hewitt Humphrey	Roger Farrelly, Leah Panapa, Bryce Casey, Andrew Mulligan, Jeremy Pickford	Patrina Roche, Callum Procter	Carl Fletcher, Vaughan Smith	Neil Collins	Kim Hill	Leighton Smith	
2013 New Zealand Radio Awards	Hewitt Humphrey	The Morning Rumble	Callum & P	Drive with Fletch & Vaughan	Neil Collins	Saturday Morning with Kim Hill	The Leighton Smith Show	
2013 New Zealand Radio Awards	Radio New Zealand National	The Rock	Classic Hits Dunedin	The Edge	Radio Dunedin	Radio New Zealand National	Newstalk ZB	
2012 New Zealand Radio Awards
2012 New Zealand Radio Awards	Hilary Barry	Jay-Jay Feeney, Mike Puru & Dom Harvey	Mark Bunting & Justine Allen	Jono Pryor & Robert Taylor	Neil Collins	Mike Hosking	Mike Yardley	
2012 New Zealand Radio Awards	Hilary Barry	Jay-Jay, Mike & Dom	Bunty and Justine in the Morning	Robert and Jono	Neil Collins	The Mike Hosking Breakfast	Mike Yardley Canterbury Mornings	
2012 New Zealand Radio Awards	Radio Live	The Edge	Classic Hits Waikato	The Rock	Radio Dunedin	Newstalk ZB	Newstalk ZB Christchurch	
2011 New Zealand Radio Awards
2011 New Zealand Radio Awards	Nicola Wright	Roger Farrelly, Bryce Casey, Leah Panapa & Paul Ego	Mike West, Gareth Pringle & Bel Crawford	Robert Taylor & Jono Pryor	Katrina Smith	Mike Hosking	Willie Jackson & John Tamihere	
2011 New Zealand Radio Awards	Nicola Wright	The Morning Rumble	Mike West in the Morning	Robert and Jono	Days with Katrina Smith	Mike Hosking Breakfast	Willie and JT	
2011 New Zealand Radio Awards	Radio New Zealand National	The Rock	More FM Manawatu	The Rock	More FM Nelson	Newstalk ZB	Radio Live	
