= 2018 New Zealand Radio Awards =

- Awarded for: Excellence in radio broadcasting
- Country: New Zealand
- Presented by: Radio Broadcasters Association
- Website: radioawards.co.nz

The 2018 New Zealand Radio Awards were the awards for excellence in the New Zealand radio industry during 2017. It was the 41st New Zealand Radio Awards, recognising staff, volunteers and contractors in both commercial and non-commercial broadcasting.

== Winners and nominees ==
This is a list of nominees, with winners in bold.

=== Best Community Access Programmes ===
**Best Music Programme in Any Language** **Lekker Stuff - Free FM 89.0 - Karisma Nel**: Desi Boys Party Time - Plains FM 96.9 - Viniseh Prakash, Ranjeeta Chand, Avi Kumar, Krish Krishna, Shahil Sharan, Akshay Reddy	**Best Spoken/Informational Programme in Any Language** **Heritage Matters - 105.4FM - Bill Southworth, Dougal Stevenson, Jane Edwards, Judy Southworth, Keith Scott, Anne Barrowclough, Richard Stedman**: Safe and Sound Radio Show and Podcast - Free FM 89.0 - Sandra Kyle, Catriona MacLennan, Paul Judge; Gospel Miracle Time - Arrow FM, Southland Community, Coast Access FM - John Bayliss, Pamela Bayliss

=== Best Content ===
**Best Content Director** **Newstalk ZB Network - Jason Winstanley & Nadia Tolich**: Christian Boston - More FM & The Breeze Network; Ryan Rathbone - The Edge Network	**Best Creative Feature** **Voice of the Iceberg - RNZ National - Alison Ballance, Marc Chesterman**: No Sleep til Polling - Hauraki Network - Jeremy Wells, Matt Heath, Leigh Hart, Jason Hoyte, Scotty J Stevenson, Angelina Grey, Joseph Durie, Greg Prebble, Matt Ward, Kate Britten, Tom Harper, Manaia Stewart, Jesse Williamson, Alex Hangername, Chris Goodwin; "33AD" News headlines - Newstalk ZB Network - Phil Guyan, Josh Couch, Pat Brittenden, Phil Yule, Bernadine Oilver-Kirby, Hannah Bartlett, Barry Soper, Daryl Habraken, Julia Bloore, Tims Sisarich, John Sweetman, Sir Peter Leitch, Emma Freeman, Elliot Yule, Evan Silva
**Best Podcast** **The 9th Floor - RNZ National - Tim Watkin, Guyon Espiner, Claire Eastham-Farrelly, Rebekah Parsons-King, Damian Golfinopoulos, Diego Opatowski, Jeremy Ansell, Rangi Powick, Blair Stagpoole, Jeremy Veal**: The Lost - RNZ National - Paloma Migone, Tom Watkin, Phil Benge, Rebekah Parsons-King; Bang! - RNZ National - Melody Thomas, Tim Watkins, William Saunders	**Best Show Producer** **The Mike Hosking Breakfast - Newstalk ZB Network - Emily Winstanley**: Checkpoint with John Campbell - RNZ National - Pip Keane; The Morning Rumble - The Rock Network - Ryan Maguire
**Best Video** **Bhuja TV- Neil Finn - Hauraki Network - Matt Ward, Leigh Hart, Jason Hoyte, Brent Spilane**: Lorde: The Babysitter - ZM Network - Vaughn Smith, Indie Smith, August Smith, Ella Yelich-O'Connor, Tavis Hughes; The Intern - ZM Network - Ellie Harwood, Alan Morrison, Carl Fletcher, Vaughn Smith, Megan Papas, Caitlin Marett, Jase Hawkins, PJ Harding, Gary Pointon	

=== Best New Broadcaster ===
**Best New Broadcaster - Off-Air** **Hybrid Designer - NZME Network - Evan Paea**: Integration Coordinator - The Edge Network - Finlay Robertson; Creative Writer - More FM Auckland - Jessica Smith; Copywriter - NZME Network - Sophie Thomsen	**Best New Broadcaster - On-Air** **Reporter/Producer - RadioLIVE Network - Shannon Redstall**: Day Show Host - The Hits Wellington - Hayley Bath; Announcer - More FM Southland, Operations and Promotions Manager - MORE FM Southland - Steven Broad; Reporter - RNZ National - Maja Burry

=== Best News & Sport ===
**Best News or Sports Journalist** **RNZ National - Benedict Collins**: RNZ National - Phil Pennington; RNZ National - Alexa Cook	**Best News Story - Team Coverage** **Port Hills Fire - Newshub/RadioLIVE Network - Newshub Auckland & Christchurch Teams**: Election 2017 - RNZ National - Carol Hirschfeld, Colin McRae, Martin Gibson, Pip Keane, Tim Watkin, John Campbell, Guyon Espiner, Jane Patterson, Mihingarangi Forbers, Calvin Samuel; Vote 2017 - Newstalk ZB Network - The Newstalk ZB Team
**Best Newsreader** **Newstalk ZB Network - Niva Retimanu**: Newstalk ZB Network - Kay Gregory; RNZ National - Paul Brennan; More FM Network - Glen Stuart	**Best Sports Reader, Presenter or Commentator** **The Devlin Radio Show - Radio Sport Network - Martin Devlin**: D'Arcy and Goran - Radio Sport Network - D'Arcy Waldegrave & Goran Paladin; Radio Sport Breakfast - Radio Sport Network - Kent Johns, Nathan Rarere, Marc Peard
**Best Sports Story - Team Coverage** **The America's Cup - Newstalk ZB/ Radio Sport Network - Peter Montgomery, Jason Winstanley, Gareth Lischner, Radio Sport Team, Newstalk ZB team**: Remembering Sir Colin Meads - Newstalk ZB/ Radio Sport Network - Tony Veitch, Sam Hewat, Kent Johns, Nathan Rarere, Marc Peard, Martin Devlin, Hayden O'Neill, Elliott Smith, Charlie Bristow, Reuben Mama, Alex Chapman, Louis Herman-Watt; Lions Tour 2017 - Radio Sport Network - Nigel Yalden, Kent Johns, Nathan Rarere, Marc Peard, Martin Devlin, Hayden O'Neill, Elliott Smith, Charlie Bristow, Daniel McHardy, Brian Ashby, Beavan Dewar, Eli Mwaijumba, NZME Engineering Team	

=== Best On Air ===
**Best Music Breakfast Show - Network** **ZM's Fletch, Vaughn & Megan - ZM Network - Carl Fletcher, Vaughn Smith, Megan Papas, Caitlin Marett, James Johnston, Anna Henvest**: Mai Morning Crew - Mai FM Network - Nickson Clark, Nate Nauer, Lily Taurau, Ryan Foster; Si & Gary - More FM Network - Simon Barnett, Gary McCormick, Samantha Baxter, Chris Bond, Chris Goodyear, Christan Boston	**Best Music Breakfast Show - Single Market** **More FM Breakfast with John, Flash & Toast - More FM Northland - John Markby, Angela 'Flash' Gordon, Tauha 'Toast' TeKani, Bryn Ingham**: Callum & P - The Hits Dunedin - Callum Proctor, Patrina Roache; Mike West in the Morning with Gareth & Johnelle - More FM Manuwatu - Mike West, Gareth Pringle, Johnelle Hosking
**Best Music Non-Breakfast Solo Host - Single Market** **More FM Social Club with Toast - More FM Northland - Tauha ' Toast' TeKani**: Will on The Hits - The Hits Bay of Plenty - - Will Johnston; More FM Workplace Social Club with George - More FM Wellington - George Smith	**Best Music Non-Breakfast Team Network** **The Rock Drive with Thane and Dunc - The Rock Network - Thane Kirby, Duncan Heyde, Jeremy Pickford**: ZM's Jase & PJ - ZM Network - Jase Hawkins, PJ Harding, Alex Perigo, David Rooney; Jono Ben & Sharyn - The Edge Network - Jono Pryor, Ben Boyce, Sharyn Casey, Dan Webby, Tom McKenzie
**Best Music Non-Breakfast Solo Host - Network** **Rock Workday Afternoons - The Rock Network - Jim Cawthorn**: Nights with Estelle - The Hits Network - Estelle Clifford; More FM's Workplace Social Club - More FM Wellington - George Smith	**Best Talk Presenter - Breakfast or Drive** **The Mike Hosking Breakfast - Newstalk ZB Network - Mike Hosking**: Checkpoint with John Campbell - RNZ National - John Campbell; Larry Williams Drive - Newstalk ZB Network - Larry Williams
**Best Talk Presenter - Other** **Marcus Lush Nights - Newstalk ZB Network - Marcus Lush**: The Leighton Smith Show - Newstalk ZB Network - Leighton Smith; Saturday morning with Kim Hill - RNZ National - Kim Hill	

=== Best Promotion ===
**Best Client Digital/Social Promotion** **The ACC Mammoth Summer of Cricket - NZME Network - Jeremy Wells, Matt Heath, Leigh Hart, Jason Hoyte, Mike Lane, Lee Baker, Paul Ford, Joseph Durie**: KFC Millennial Engagement Campaign - The Edge Network - Amber Howard, Danielle Tolich, Samuel Fullick, Lucy Carthew, Ricky Bannister, Ryan Rathbone, Dena Roberts; New World Wine Awards - More FM Network - Courtney Tickner, Nicki Covich, Amber Howard	**Best Client Promotion/ Activation - Network** **Jono, Ben and Sharyn's Cool Town Bro with Hallenstein Brothers - The Edge Network - Finlay Robertson, Rob Dickey, Rebekah Dewhurst**: KFC Edgefest - The Edge Network - Danielle Tolich, Dena Roberts, Ryan Rathbone; Every Caller Wins Flights with Air New Zealand Grabaseat - The Edge Network - Rebekah Dewhurst, Dena Roberts
**Best Client Promotion/ Activation - Single market** **Tourism & Events Queensland - More FM Canterbury - Michelle Jones, Chris Goodyear**: Bring Them Home For Mother's Day - Breeze Dunedin - Damian Newell, Jacob Kendall, Nick Robinson; Blame the Groom - 93.2 More FM Taranaki - Samantha Vega	**Best Digital Content** **http://www.zmonline.com - ZM Network - Ellie Harwood, Trinette Sands, Sarah Mount, Lucy Carthew**: http://www.theedge.co.nz - The Edge Network - Lucy Carthew, Ricky Bannister, Samuel Fullick, Stephanie Munro; http://www.therock.net.nz - The Rock Network - Stacey McLeod, Michael Baker, Chanel Potaka
**Best Marketing Campaign** **ZM's $50,000 Secret Sound - ZM Network - Justine Black, Fiona Kerr, Ashleigh Van Graan, Alistair Cockburn**: The Fugitive - ZM Network - Anita Waugh, Justine Black, Fiona Kerr; KFC Edgefest - The Edge Network - Lucy Hills, Angela Wedekind, Ryan Rathbone	**Best Network Station Promotion** **Flochella - ZM Network - ZM Network Team**: The ZM Fugitive - ZM Network - Cameron Maurice, Ross Flahive, Gary Pointon, Alistair Cockburn, Katrina Jones; Win Jay-Jay' Boobs - The Edge Network - Jay Jay Feeney, Rebekah Dewhurst, Dena Roberts

=== Best Radio Creative ===
**Best Creative Commercial - Single or Campaign** **NZTA - Dem Phones - More FM Northland - Alastair Barran, Chris Hurring**: NZTA Northland Road Safety - NZME Northland - Iain Rea; Taupo District Council - NZME Taupo - Shara Benitez, Andrew Jack	**Best Voice Talent** **George FM Network - Hannah James**: MediaWorks Network - Richard Alexander; NZME and Rhema Media - Ronnie Mackie
**Most Effective Commercial - Single or Campaign** **Moola - The Rock Network - Alistair Barran, Chris Hurring**: Destination Rotorua - NZME Auckland & Christchurch - Evan Paea; Blue Wing Honda - Break Up FD - NZME Network - Paul McIlroy	

=== Best Spoken Programmes ===
**Best Single Market Station Promotion** **Edge Heads - The Edge Southland - Mitchell Fulton, Steve Broad**: Wedding in a Week - The Breeze Wellington - Caroline Gorst, Casey Sullivan, Steve Joll, Kath Bier, Pearl Leonard; Song for a Suburb - The Breeze Auckland - Robert Rakete, Jeanette Thomas, Braydon Priest, Will Maisey	**Best Station Digital/Social Promotion** **Jim's All About The Nookie Campaign - The Rock Network - Jim Cawthorn, Stacey McLeod, Michael Baker**: Log On for National Crate Day - The Rock Network - Stacey Wouters, Michael Baker, Duncan Heyde, Megan Vasey; Mai FM's AB's Hip Hop Challenge - Mai FM Network - Laura Haden, Amanda Midgley, Phillip Bell
**Best Daily or Weekly Feature** **This Way Up - RNZ National - Simon Morton, Alison Ballance, Richard Scott**: Mediawatch - RNZ National - Colin Peacock, Jeremy Rose, Dominic Godfrey, Zoe George; Checkpoint with John Campbell - RNZ National - Pip Keane, John Campbell, Catherine Walbridge, Bridget Burke, Zac Fleming, Calvin Samuel, Michelle Cooke	**Best Documentary** **The 9th Floor - RNZ National - Tim Watkin, Guyon Espiner, Claire Eastham-Farrelly, Rebekah Parsons-King, Damian Golfinopoulos, Diego Opatowski, Jeremy Ansell, Rangi Powick, Blair Stagpoole, Jeremy Veal**: The Lost - RNZ National - Paloma Migone, Tim Watkin, Phil Benge, Rebekah Parsons-King; Flying Solo - RNZ National - Lynda Chanwai-Earle, Jason McClelland, William Saunders, Alison Ballance, Tim Watkin

=== Best Technical Production ===
**Best Station Imaging** **The Edge Network - Grant Brodie**: ZM Network - Alistair Cockburn; The Rock Network - Joe Baxendale; Mai FM Network - Kieran Bell	**Best Station Trailer** **ZM's Secret Sound - ZM Network - Alistair Cockburn**: The ZM Fugitive - ZM Network - Alistair Cockburn; Fletch, Vaughn & Megan's Long Weekend Group Toot - ZM Network - Alistair Cockburn
**Commercial Production** **NZTA Dem Phones - More FM Northland - Chris Hurring, Alistair Barran**: Northland Regional Council - More FM Northland - Chris Hurring, Alistair Barram; Destination Rotorua - NZME Auckland, Christchurch - Evan Paea	

=== Station of the Year ===
**Station of the Year - Network** **Mai FM - Mai FM Network - Philip Bell**: RNZ National - David Allan; More FM - More FM Network - Christian Boston	**Station of the Year - Non-Surveyed Market** **One Double X - One Double X Whakatane - Glenn Smith**: Radio Wanaka - Mike Regal; 93.6 More FM - 93.6 More FM Taupo - Irene Nottage, Dougal Morison, Sara Pilkington
**Station of the Year - Surveyed Market** **More FM - More FM Canterbury - Jason Mac, Rob McDonald, Christian Boston**: The Breeze - The Breeze Auckland - Will Maisey, Christian Boston; More FM - More FM Northland - Erena Miller, Bryn Ingham, Geraldine Henare	

=== Other ===
**Associated Craft Award** **MediaWorks Trade Marketing Team - MediaWorks Radio - Jessica Knox, Cathy Fali, Alex Jolly, Isaiah Tour, Megan Leach, Emily Hargest**: MediaWorks Radio Integration Team - MediaWorks Radio - Danielle Tolich, Nikki Flint, Rob Dickey, Nicki Covich, Morgan Penn; NZME Group Creative Team - NZME Radio Brands - Justine Black, Jon Coles, Tracey Fox, Ashleigh van Graan, Fraser Tebbutt, John Pelasio, Nicola Milliner, Kayoung Lee, Abbie-Rose Foley, Michael Pati Fuiava, Lincoln Putnam	**The 'Blackie' Award** **Jay-Jay, Dom & Randell's Tom Cruise Prank - The Edge Network - Jay-Jay Harvey, Dominic Harvey, Clinton Randell, Tom McKenzie**: Bryce Fills In For Phil - The Rock Network - Bryce Casey, Andrew Mulligan, Roger Farrelly, Jennifer Bainnridge, John Day, Ryan Maguire; Ed Sheeran's Plea For Citizenship - ZM Network - Gary Pointon, Vaughn Smith, Alistair Cockburn
**Best Maori Language Broadcast** **Te Kupenga o Taramainuku Commemorations - Tumeke FM - Jarrod Dodd, Tracey Patrick, Casino Stevens, Wiremu Huta-Martin, Anituatua Balck, Maraea Davies, Danae Lee**: Broadcast of the 30th anniversary of Te Reo Irirangi o Ngati Porou - Radio Ngati Porou - Eran Keelan-Reedy, Darylene Rogers	**Best Music Feature or Recorded Live Music Event** **The Rock 1500 - The Rock Network - Brad King, Reagan White, Stacey Wouters, Michael Baker, Jacqueline Williams, Jim Cowan, Andre Upston, Dave Wernham**: APO Starman - RNZ Concert - Adrian Hollay, Tim Dodd; NZSO Aotearoa Plus - RNZ Concert - Graham Kennedy, David McCaw
**Best Community Campaign** **Pledge for Plunket - The Hits Network - Ben Humphrey, Jenny Mulligan, Todd Campbell, Laura Campbell, Celia Whitley**: Edgecumbe Flood Relief - Radio 1XX - Glenn Smith; Morning Rumble Mental Health Awareness - The Rock Network - Bryce Casey, Andrew Mulligan, Roger Farrelly, Ryan Maguire	**Sales Team of the Year** **The Radio Bureau - The Radio Bureau National - Peter Richardson, Fraser McGergor, Jane Hitchfield, Jennifer Came, Karen McPherson, Missy Dare, Dusan Matic, Kenneth d'Souza, Michael Matthews, Tom Raybould, Ally Myers, Jimmy Hills, Hannah Bourke, Ellen-Marie Atkinson**: MediaWorks Otago - Janine Tindall-Morice, Alice Wisker, Sonya Fraser, Ben Patston, Priscilla Dixon, Dan Murphy, Anna Esquillant, James Morris, Tony Bennett; MediaWorks Network Agency - Donna Gurney, Gerhard Simanke, Matt Tattle, Paul Glaister, Amanda Nicholls, Phillipa Stiebel, Mike Berry, Molly Lawrence, Johnathan Schaffer, Tim Norman, Steven Lee, Alice Brougham
**Best Children's Programme** **The Crazy Kiwi Christmas Kids Show - Christian Broadcasting Assoc & NZME - Phil Guyan, Bjorn Brickell, Dayna Vawdrey, Levi Guyan, Daryl Habraken, Phil Yule, Chris Newbold, Erin Carpenter, Colin Cassidy, Steph Couch, Jacinda Ardern, Mike Hosking, Kerre McIvor**: That's The Story - Radio Rhema - Ronnie Mackie, Zoe Nash, Cameron Nash, Chris Hitchcock, Kate Carey, Carol Green, John Martin, Hebron College, Racheal Joel, Linda Tomikino; Suzy & Friends - Treehut Limited - Suzy Cato, Trevor Plant, Phil Yule, Brent Holt	**Outstanding Contribution to Radio** **Mike Hosking** **Jay- Jay Feeney**
**Services to Broadcasting** **Kevin Hercock** **Brendan Telfer** **Barry Patterson** **James Daniels** **Lloyd Scott** **Warren Male** **John Bedford** **Bryan Waddle** **Peter Everett** **Mark Perry**	**Sir Paul Holmes Broadcaster of the Year** **1XX**
