= 2021 New Zealand Radio Awards =

- Awarded for: Excellence in radio broadcasting
- Country: New Zealand
- Presented by: Radio Broadcasters Association
- Website: radioawards.co.nz

The 2021 New Zealand Radio Awards are the awards for excellence in the New Zealand radio industry during 2020. It was the 44th New Zealand Radio Awards, recognising staff, volunteers and contractors in both commercial and non-commercial broadcasting.

== Winners & Finalists ==
Best Content Director / Content Team

Winners: Matt Anderson, Amy Tempero, Christian Boston (More FM Network) Finalists:

  - Caitlin Cherry (RNZ National)
  - Will Maisey, Kris Edwards, Christian Boston (The Breeze Network)
  - Jason Winstanley, Edward Swift (Newstalk ZB Network)
Best Entertainment Podcast

Winner: Black Sheep (William Ray, Tim Watkin, William Saunders, RNZ National) Finalists:

  - The Agenda (Matt Heath, Mike Lane, James McOnie, Jeremy Wells, Joseph Shuker, Joseph Durie, NZME / The ACC)
  - The Self Love Club with Bel Crawford (Bel Crawford, Nick Baldwin)
Best News/Current Affairs Podcast

Winner: The Service (John Daniell, Guyon Espiner, William Ray, Tim Watkin, Veronica Schmidt, Adrian Hollay, RNZ & Bird of Paradise) Finalists:

  - The Detail (Emile Donovan, Sharon Brettkelly, Alexia Russell, Jessie Chiang, Jeremy Ansell, Blair Stagpoole, Rangi Powick, Adrian Hollay, Mark Jennings, Tim Watkin, RNZ & Newsroom)
  - The Unthinkable (Susie Ferguson, William Saunders, Liz Garton, Tim Watkin, RNZ National)
Best Show Producer/Team - Music Show

Winner: Troy Scott (Steve & Kath, The Breeze Wellington) Finalists:

  - Ben Humphrey, Juliet Wrathall, Heidi Roberts, Max Middleton (The Hits Breakfast with Jono & Ben, The Hits Network)
  - Anna Henvest, Sarah Mount, Jared Pickstock (ZM's Fletch, Vaughan & Megan, ZM Network)
Best Show Producer/Team - Talk Show

Winner: Annabel Reid, Bridget Burke, Lydia Batham, Pip Keane (Checkpoint, RNZ National) Finalists:

  - Laura Beattie (Heather du Plessis-Allan Drive, Newstalk ZB Network)
  - Dan Goodwin (Marcus Lush Nights, Newstalk ZB Network)
Best Station Imaging

Winner: Alistair Cockburn, Brynee Wilson (ZM Network) Finalists:

  - Joe Baxendale, Reagan White (The Rock Network)
  - Josh Wood, Mel Dooley (More FM Network)
Best Station Trailer

Winner: ZM's $100k Secret Sound (Alistair Cockburn, Claire Chellew, Richie Simpson, Tom Harper, Gary Pointon, ZM Network) Finalists:

  - Flava Relaunch (Alistair Cockburn, Storme Hitaua, Astley Nathan, Brad Watson, Ross Flahive, Flava Network)
  - ZM's Best of the Last Decade (Brynee Wilson, Richie Simpson, Claire Chellew, Tom Harper, ZM Network)
Best Video

Winner: NZ Hip Hop Stand Up (Chris Graham, Nigel McCulloch, Alice Murray, Tim Burnell, Kay Ellmers, RNZ National) Finalists:

  - Ryan's Pepeha (Aaron Ly, Nikora Price, Ryan Foster, Sidney Collett, Heemi Kapa-Kingi, Mai FM Network)
  - Take it Easy Aotearoa (Ricky Bannister, Sharyn Casey, Jayden King, Dan Webby, Grant Brodie, Casey Sullivan, The Edge Network)
  - Rock Drive with Jay and Dunc 'Poo Towns 100' (Jeremy Pickford, Jay Reeve, Duncan Heyde, Jack Honeybone, The Rock Network)
The Blackie Award

Winner: The Siri Prank (Jono Pryor, Ben Boyce, Ben Humphrey, Juliet Wrathall, Heidi Roberts, Max Middleton, Aaron Watkinson, Todd Campbell, Allan George, Josh Todd, Annie Pryor, John Pryor, The Hits Network) Finalists:

  - The Trump Prank (Jono Pryor, Ben Boyce, Ben Humphrey, Juliet Wrathall, Heidi Roberts, Max Middleton, Aaron Watkinson, Todd Campbell, Allan George, Josh Todd, Lachie Oliver-Kerby, The Hits Network)
  - Poo Towns 100 (Jeremy Pickford, Jay Reeve, Duncan Heyde, Jack Honeybone, The Rock Network)
Best Access Radio Programme

Winner: It's Getting Hot in Here (Laura Gartner, Tanya Didham, Victoria Harwood, Sheldon Murtha, Plains FM) Finalists:

  - Namaste Nepal (Binod Parajuli, Plains FM)
  - The C Word (Helen King, Planet FM)
Best Children's Programme

Winner: Nanogirl's Great Science Adventures (Michelle Dickinson, Sophie Fern, Rangi Powick, Liz Garton, Kate Sparks, Jocelyn Bunch, Tim Watkin, RNZ & Nanogirl Labs) Finalists:

  - What Will I Be Today? (Marie Silberstein, Jane Waddell, Victor Rodger, Renee Liang, Steph Matuku, Kyle Mewburn, Kay Ellmers, Adam Macaulay, Tim Burnell, RNZ National)
  - The Crazy Kiwi Christmas Kids Show (Grace Bucknell, Phil Yule, Bjorn Brickell, Leanna Cooper, Daryl Habraken, Eden Bloore, Chris Newbold, Elesha Gordon, Julia Bloore, Josh Couch, Petra Bagust, Christian Broadcasters Assn / NZME)
  - Everybody Wants to Join the Fleabite Band (Robin Nathan, Shannon Williams, FleaBITE)
Best Daily or Weekly Feature - Factual

Winner: Black Sheep (William Ray, Tim Watkin, William Saunders, RNZ National) Finalists:

  - Are We There Yet? (Katy Gosset, Alex Harmer, Adam Macaulay, Tim Watkin, RNZ National)
  - Country Life (Carol Stiles, Sally Round, Cosmo Kentish-Barnes, Duncan Smith, David Knowles, RNZ National)
  - Mediawatch (Colin Peacock, Hayden Donnell, RNZ National)
Best Documentary or Factual Talk Feature

Winner: The Service (John Daniell, Guyon Espiner, William Ray, Tim Watkin, Veronica Schmidt, Adrian Hollay, RNZ & Bird of Paradise) Finalists:

  - Voices from Antarctica (Alison Ballance, Phil Benge, William Saunders, RNZ National)
  - Widows of Shuhada (Lana Hart, Nicki Reece, Asha Abdi, Jumayah Jones, Asma Azhar, Janneth Gil, Liz Garton, Alex Harmer, Bryony Lastowicka, Tim Watkin, Justin Gregory, RNZ & Plains FM)
Best Music Feature

Winner: Coca-Cola Christmas on The Breeze (Will Maisey, Kris Edwards, Braydon Priest, Carl Thompson, Dixon Nacey, The Breeze Network) Finalists:

  - Poo Towns (Jeremy Pickford, Jay Reeve, Duncan Heyde, Jack Honeybone, Raynor Perreau, Joe Baxendale, Grant Brodie, The Rock Network)
  - Rocktober 2020 (Mike Lane, Greg Prebble, Joseph Durie, Tom Harper, Claire Chellew, Jacki Polkinghorne, Radio Hauraki Network)
Best Breakfast Show - Music Network

Winner: ZM's Fletch, Vaughan & Megan (Carl Fletcher, Vaughan Smith, Megan Papas, Anna Henvest, Sarah Mount, Jared Pickstock, ZM Network) Finalists:

  - The Morning Rumble (Roger Farrelly, Andrew Mulligan, Bryce Casey, Ryan Maguire, Guy Mansell, Mel Abbot, The Rock Network)
  - Dom, Meg and Randell (Dom Harvey, Meg Mansell, Clint Randell, Hamish Phipps, Alex Mullin, The Edge Network)
Best Host - Music Network

Winner: Robert Scott The Breeze Network Drive Show (The Breeze Network) Finalists:

  - Steph Monks The Edge Workday (The Edge Network)
  - Jen Bainbridge The Rock Workday (The Rock Network)
Best Team Show - Music Network

Winner: Rock Drive with Jay and Dunc (Jay Reeve, Duncan Heyde, Jeremy Pickford, Jack Honeybone, The Rock Network) Finalists:

  - ZM's Bree & Clint (Bree Tomasel, Clint Roberts, Ben McDowell, Anastasia Loeffen, Ellie Harwood, ZM Network)
  - Jay-Jay & Flynny (Jay-Jay Feeney, Paul Flynn, Dave Rybinski, George Smith, Matt Anderson, Christian Boston, More FM Network)
Best Music Breakfast Show - Local

Winner: Cal & P (Callum Procter, Patrina Roche, The Hits Dunedin) Finalists:

  - John, Flash and Toast (John Markby, Angela Gordon, Tauha Tekani, Tarsh Ieremia, Dean Mgovern, Erena Miller, More FM Northland)
  - Robert & Jeanette (Robert Rakete, Jeanette Thomas, Tania Burgess, Will Maisey, The Breeze Auckland)
Best Music Host - Local

Winner: Will Johnston (The Hits Bay Of Plenty) Finalists:

  - Amber Russell (More FM Canterbury)
  - Sue White (The Breeze Canterbury)
Best Music Host or Team - Non Surveyed Market

Winner: Breakfast with Brent & Jacque (More FM Rodney) Finalists:

  - Ocean Ford Breakfast (Jack Van Der Heyden, Carlos Hunia, Sun FM)
  - The Andrew Leiataua Breakfast Show (More FM Taupo)
Best Talk Presenter - Breakfast or Drive

Winner: Lisa Owen (Checkpoint, RNZ National) Finalists:

  - Mike Hosking (The Mike Hosking Breakfast, Newstalk ZB Network)
  - Heather du Plessis-Allan (Heather du Plessis-Allan Drive, Newstalk ZB Network)
Best Talk Presenter - Other

Winner: Marcus Lush (Marcus Lush Nights, Newstalk ZB Network) Finalists:

  - Kathryn Ryan (Nine to Noon, RNZ National)
  - Kim Hill (Saturday Morning, RNZ National)
Best New Broadcaster - Journalist

Winner: Aaron Dahmen (Newstalk ZB) Finalists:

  - Charlotte Cook (RNZ National)
  - Katie Todd (RNZ National)
Best New Broadcaster - Off-Air

Winner: Alex Lansdown (The Hits Network) Finalists:

  - Dayna Ruka (MagicTalk Network)
  - Steph Walsh (NZME Wellington)
  - Lachie Oliver-Kerby (NZME)
Best New Broadcaster - On-Air

Winner: Jayden King (The Edge Network) Finalists:

  - Connor Kitto (NZME Otago)
  - Matthew Pledger (MediaWorks)
  - Randy Sjafrie (Mai FM Network)
The Johnny Douglas Award

Winner: Joel Harrison (ZM Network & Static 88.1) Finalists:

  - Cara Botica (Static 88.1)
  - Emma Duffy (MediaWorks Northland)
Best News or Sports Journalist

Winner: Barry Soper (Newstalk ZB Network) Finalists:

  - Eva Corlett (RNZ National)
  - Guyon Espiner (RNZ National)
Best News Story - Team Coverage

Winner: Checkpoint Covid Lockdown Special (Pip Keane, Bridget Burke, Lisa Owen, Calvin Samuel, Annabel Reid, Lydia Batham, Nita Blake-Persen, Nick Truebridge, Logan Church, Louise Ternouth, Susana Lei'ataua, RNZ National) Finalists:

  - Election 2020 (Newstalk ZB Team, Newstalk ZB)
  - Whakaari/White Island Anniversary (Sarah Robson, Jean Bell, Charlotte Cook, Te Aniwa Hurihanganui, Dom Thomas, RNZ National)
  - Mosque Shooter Sentencing (Belinda McCammon, Conan Young, Tim Brown, Logan Church, Nathan McKinnon, Eleisha Foon, Anan Zaki, Rachel Graham, Katie Todd, Anneke Smith, RNZ National)
Best Newsreader

Winner: Nicola Wright (RNZ National) Finalists:

  - Niva Retimanu (Newstalk ZB Network)
  - Raylene Ramsay (Newstalk ZB Network)
Best Sports Reader, Presenter or Commentator

Winner: The Alternative Commentary Collective (Mike Lane, Jeremy Wells, Matt Heath, James McOnie, Jason Hoyte, Scotty J Stevenson, Mike Minogue, Manaia Stewart, Chris Key, Ben Hurley, Paul Ford, Dylan Cleaver, Leigh Hart, Joseph Durie, Joseph Shuker, Tom Harper, Claire Chellew, NZME / The ACC / iHeart Radio) Finalist: Elliott Smith (Newstalk ZB Network)

Best Sports Story - Team Coverage

Winner: The America's Cup World Series Auckland (Peter Montgomery, Chris Steele, Louis Herman-Watt, Andy McDonnell, Andy Duff, Gareth Lischner, Newstalk ZB Sports Team, NZME) Finalists:

  - North v South (Mike Lane, James McOnie, Matt Heath, Joseph Durie, Tom Harper, Radio Hauraki & the ACC)
  - The ACC Super 7's Competition (Mike Lane, Joseph Durie, Tom Harper, Radio Hauraki & the ACC)
Best Client Promotion/Activation

Winner: The Vibe with V Energy (The Edge Network Team, MediaWorks) Finalists:

  - Sharyn & Jayden's Give Us a Tow with RJ's (The Edge Network Team, MediaWorks)
  - V Energy Game Changer (The Rock, George FM & Mai FM, MediaWorks)
Best Marketing Campaign

Winner: A Christmas Special Like No Other - Christmas on the Breeze (Lee Gilmour, Will Maisey, Tiffany Montgomery, Jacquetta Hazlett, The Breeze Network) Finalists:

  - Flava - Old School Hip Hop & RnB Launch (Monique Hodgson, John Pelasio, Megan Sagar, Josh Todd, Sydney Plested, Flava Network)
  - Matt Heath & Jeremy Wells - Live Headlines (Claire Chellew, Mike Lane, Joe Durie, Tom Harper, Lumo Digital, Pitchblack Partners, Radio Hauraki Network)
Best Network Station Promotion

Winner: Coca-Cola Christmas on The Breeze (Will Maisey, Tiffany Montgomery, Braydon Priest, Nicky Ranson, Sarah Nickson-Clark, Carl Thompson, The Breeze Network) Finalists:

  - Ding Dong Ditch (Caitlin Coffey, Bex Dewhurst, Dena Roberts, Finlay Robertson, Anglea Wedekind, Ricky Bannister, Grant Brodie, Casey Sullivan, The Edge Network)
  - The Rock 2000 (Jacqueline Williams, Brad King, Reagan White, Jack Honeybone, Sophie Currie, Michael Baker, Ricky Bannister, Emily Reid, Joe Baxendale, Nicki Covich, Aileen Lau, The Rock Network)
Best Single Market Station Promotion

Winner: Ernie & the Magic Kennel (Will Maisey, Tiffany Montgomery, Jeanette Thomas, Robert Rakete, Grace Rhynd, The Breeze Auckland) Finalists:

  - Christmas Pass the Parcel (Jess Taylor, Todd Fisher, Hiliary Schroeder, Mitch Fulton, Nikita Leck, Steve Broad, Chris Goodyear, Amber Russell, Lana Searle, Gary McCormick, Jason Mac, Samantha Baxter, Chris Bond, More FM Canterbury)
  - Nick The Tix (Mitchell Fulton, The Edge Canterbury)
Best Website and Social Content

Winner: The Edge Network (Ricky Bannister, Jerome Sears, MediaWorks Digital Team, The Edge Network) Finalists:

  - The Rock (Michael Baker, Raynor Perreau, MediaWorks Digital Team, The Rock Network)
  - Radio Hauraki & the ACC (Joseph Durie, Tom Harper, Joseph Shuker, Finn Caddie, Radio Hauraki & the ACC)
  - ZM On Line (Carwen Jones, Sarah Mount, Gary Pointon, Megan Sagar, ZM Network)
Associated Craft Award

Winner: MediaWorks Technology Team (Mike Heard, Christian Shearer, Kieran Connellan, Brad Wright, Rob Stewart, Blake Beale, Jim Cowan, Richard Brayne, Will Plummer, Bradley Hamilton, Ray Smith, Tony Grimwood, Dane Cookson, Christopher Smith, Graham Wright, Andrew Scott, Emma Michell, Peter Wallace, Bradley Bacon, MediaWorks) Finalists:

  - MediaWorks Trade Marketing Team (Jessica James, Melissa Stephenson, Kat Blackburn, Alex Kenny, MediaWorks)
  - MediaWorks Integration Team (Sunshine Moore, Nikki Flint, Sam West, Bex Dewhurst, Nicki Covich, Amber Howard, Jessie Matheson, Finlay Robertson, Aileen Lau, Penny Quirk, Jarrod Stevenson, Jess Smith, Abby Lawrence, Larissa O'Reilly, Arun Beard, Sophie Currie, Kiriana Jones, Rykah Hadaway, MediaWorks)
Best Community Campaign

Winner: Coca-Cola Christmas on The Breeze (Will Maisey, Tiffany Montgomery, Nicky Ranson, Sarah Nickson-Clark, The Breeze Network) Finalists:

  - Northland Rescue Helicopter Fundraiser (John Markby, Angela Gordon, Tauha Tekani, Tarsh Ieremia, Dean McGovern, Erena Miller, More FM Northland)
  - The Morning Rumble 'Day on the Darts' (Bryce Casey, Roger Farrelly, Andrew Mulligan, The Rock Network)
Sales Team of the Year

Winner: NZME Auckland (Neil Jackson, Tweenie Hayward-Brown, Chelsea Norman, Ellyn Ricketts, NZME) Finalists:

  - MediaWorks Gisborne (Debby Cresswell, Mandy Fitzgerald, Ander Bataritta, MediaWorks Gisborne)
  - MediaWorks Waikato (Justine Dixon, Julie Rowlands, Kerriann Ashworth, Lesley MacDonald, Sarah Morrison, Stew Melrose, Ashlee Walsh, Deidre Robertson, MediaWorks Waikato)
Best Commercial Campaign

Winner: Far North Reap & Waka Kotahi "Think" (Richard Matthews, Benjamin French, Hope Etherington, Kevin Etherington, MediaWorks) Finalists:

  - Spookers - Friday the 13th (Alastair Barran, Chris Hurring, MediaWorks)
  - Taupo Violence Intervention - Unspoken Rules (Tracy O'Halloran, Lisa Soden, James Irwin, Stephen Lovatt, Jono Manx, Liam O'Halloran, Chris Ryan, NZME)
Best Commercial Production

Winner: NRC - No Sense it Makes (Chris Hurring, Alastair Barran, MediaWorks) Finalists:

  - NZTA Northland Road Safety (Leanne McDonald, Andrea Hawcridge, Glenn Dwight, Tess Jamieson-Karaha, NZME)
  - Spookers - Darin (Chris Hurring, Alastiar Barran, Michael Wightman, MediaWorks)
  - Rock Fishing - CAPS Hauraki (Ben French, Hamish Nixon, Dezley Davidson, MediaWorks)
Best Single Commercial

Winner: Taupo Violence Intervention - Born to be a Man (Tracy O'Halloran, Lisa Soden, James Irwin, Stephen Lovatt, NZME) Finalists:

  - Rock Fishing - CAPS Hauraki (Hamish Nixon, Benjamin French, MediaWorks)
  - NZTA Northland Road Safety - Speed Kills (Glenn Dwight, Andrea Hawcridge, Leanne McDonald, Tess Jamieson-Karaha, NZME)
Best Voice Talent

Winner: Hannah Venneman (MediaWorks) Finalists:

  - Andy George (More FM)
  - Richie Simpson (ZM Network)
Station of the Year - Network

Winner: Newstalk ZB (NZME) Finalists:

  - Mai FM (MediaWorks)
  - RNZ National (RNZ)
  - ZM (NZME)
Station of the Year - Non-Network

Winner: One Double X (Radio Bay of Plenty) Finalists:

  - Flava Auckland (NZME)
  - The Breeze Wellington (MediaWorks)
  - More FM Manawatu (MediaWorks)

== Special awards ==
- Sir Paul Holmes Broadcaster of the Year: Mike Hosking
- Outstanding Contribution to Radio:
  - Kim Adamson
  - Phil Gifford
- Services to Broadcasting:
  - Mike Berry
  - Steve Rowe
  - Pauline Gillespie
