= 2014 New Zealand Radio Awards =

- Awarded for: Excellence in radio broadcasting
- Country: New Zealand
- Presented by: Radio Broadcasters Association
- Website: radioawards.co.nz

The 2014 New Zealand Radio Awards were the awards for excellence in the New Zealand radio industry during 2013. It was the 37th New Zealand Radio Awards, recognising staff, volunteers and contractors in both commercial and non-commercial broadcasting.

== Winners and nominees ==
This is a list of nominees, with winners in bold.

=== Air Personality of the Year ===
**Best Music Breakfast Show - Metropolitan** **Jay-Jay Feeney, Mike Puru, Dom Harvey - The Edge Breakfast with Jay-Jay, Mike & Dom - The Edge, Network - MediaWorks Radio**: Roger Farrelly, Leah Panapa, Bryce Casey, Andrew Mulligan, Jeremy Pickford - The Morning Rumble - The Rock, Network - MediaWorks Radio; Simon Barnett & Gary McCormick - Breakfast with Si & Gary - More FM, Canterbury - MediaWorks Radio	**Best Music Breakfast Show - Regional** **Mike West, Gareth Pringle & Renee Pink - Mike West in the Morning with Gareth & Renee - More FM, Manawatu - MediaWorks Radio**: Callum Procter & Patrina Roche - Callum & P - Classic Hits, Dunedin - The Radio Network; Will Johnston & Bridget Hastie - Will & Bridget in the Morning - Classic Hits, Tauranga - The Radio Network
**Best Music Non-Breakfast Host or Hosts - Metropolitan** **Robert Taylor & Jono Pryor - Robert and Jono - The Rock, Network - MediaWorks Radio**: Stephanie Monks, Martijn Hehewerth & Oscar Jackson - The Edge Night Show - The Edge, Network - MediaWorks Radio; Estelle Clifford - Classic Hits Night Show - Classic Hits, Network - The Radio Network	**Best Music Non-Breakfast Host or Hosts - Regional**: **Blair Kiddey - The Drive Home with Blair - More FM, Nelson - MediaWorks Radio**; Neil Collins - 10 - 2 Announcer - Radio Dunedin - MediaWorks Radio; Justin Evans - More FM Drive - 92.2 More FM, Manawatu - MediaWorks Radio
**Best Music Host or Hosts - Provincial** **Andrew Leiataua - The Andrew Leiataua Breakfast Show - 93.6 More FM, Taupo - MediaWorks Radio**: Lance Dunne - Breakfast with Lance - Times FM, Orewa - MediaWorks Radio; Bevan Chapman -Bevan for Breakfast - More FM, Gisborne & Wairoa - MediaWorks Radio	**Best Children's Programme** **The Crazy Christmas Kids Show - Frank Ritchie, Julia Bloore, Levi Guyan, John Sweetman, Phil Guyan, Erin Carpenter, Phil Yule, Caleb Allison - Newstalk ZB & Radio Sport - Christian Broadcasting Association**: Weekend Storytime - Prue Langbein & Adrian MacKenzie - Radio New Zealand, National - Radio New Zealand; That's The Story - Ronnie Mackie - Coast, Network - Loudmouth Productions
**Best Talk or Current Affairs Host or Hosts- All Markets** **Mike Hosking - The Mike Hosking Breakfast - Newstalk ZB, Network - The Radio Network**: Kim Hill - Saturday Morning -Radio New Zealand, National - Radio New Zealand; Duncan Garner - Drive with Duncan Garner - RadioLIVE, Auckland - MediaWorks Radio	**Best Talk Back Host or Hosts - All Market** **Leighton Smith - The Leighton Smith Show - Newstalk ZB, Network - The Radio Network**: Danny Watson - Danny Watson Afternoons - Newstalk ZB, Network - The Radio Network; Chris Lynch - Canterbury Mornings with Chris Lynch - Newstalk ZB, Christchurch - The Radio Network
**Associated Craft Award** **Rachel Langford - MediaWorks, National - MediaWorks Radio**: Senior Planners - Johnathan Schaffer, Kenneth D'Souza, Tim Norman, Mauro Murace - The Radio Bureau - The Radio Bureau; Ariel Watson - Radio 1XX - Radio Bay of Plenty Ltd

=== Best Community Access Programmes ===
**Best Music Programme in Any Language** **Winner - The World of Leopold Bloom presents Nelson Mandela & The Music of South Africa - Leopold Bloom & Matt Budd - Fresh FM - Fresh FM Nelson**: RetroSpect '60s Garage Punk Show - Phil Grey - Free FM 89.0, Waikato - Free FM; New Zealand Music - Paul Ireland - Coast Access Radio 104.7FM - Coast Access Radio Trust	**Best Spoken/ Informational English Language Programme** **Winner - SANZ Mandela Memorial Programme - Irvin Adams, Joy Adams - Planet FM, Auckland - Access Community Radio**: Ministry of Awful - Jono Corfe - Plains FM, Christchurch - Plains FM; Hashtag Radio - Phid McAwesome, Charis McAwesome, V8Matty - Free FM, Waikato - Free FM
**Best Maori Language Broadcast** **Winner - Te Whītiki o te Ki - Wikitoria Day - MFM - Te Reo Irirangi O Maniapoto**: Te Reo O Turanga 2013 - Walter Walsh - Turanga FM Gisborne, Wairoa, Nuhaka, Hawkes Bay - Te Reo Irirangi-O-Turanganui-A-Kiwa	

=== Best New Broadcaster ===
**Best New Broadcaster - Air Personality** **Winner - Renee Pink - 92.2 More FM, Manawatu - MediaWorks Radio**: Stephanie Monks - The Edge, Network - MediaWorks Radio; Dan Webby - The Rock, Network - MediaWorks Radio	**Best New Broadcaster - Journalist** **Lloyd Burr - RadioLIVE, Auckland - MediaWorks Radio**: Adam Cooper - Newstalk ZB, Network - The Radio Network; Shelley Nahr - RadioLIVE, Christchurch - MediaWorks Radio
**Best New Broadcaster - Creative and Technical** **Alex Martin - Mai FM, Kiwi FM & The Breeze - MediaWorks Radio**: Carl Thompson - The Edge, Network -MediaWorks Radio; Zoey May - MediaWorks, Taranaki - MediaWorks Radio	**Best New Broadcaster - Promotions** **Dan Peek - ZM, Network - The Radio Network**: Gracie Allum - The Edge & More FM, Waikato - MediaWorks Radio; Michaela Pickworth - Brand Engagement, Network - The Radio Network
**Overall Best New Broadcaster** **Dan Peek - ZM, Network - The Radio Network**	

=== Best News ===
**Best Newsreader** **Hilary Barry - RadioLIVE, Auckland - MediaWorks Radio**: Bernadine Oliver-Kerby - Newstalk ZB, Network - The Radio Network; Nicola Wright - Radio New Zealand, National - Radio New Zealand	**Best Team Coverage of a News Story** **Cook Strait Earthquakes - Lesley Deverall, Kim Savage, Dallas Gurney & the entire Newstalk Newsroom - Newstalk ZB, Network - The Radio Network**: Ruataniwha Dam - Don Rood, Head of News - Radio New Zealand, National - Radio New Zealand; Seddon Earthquake - Don Rood, Head of News - Radio New Zealand, National - Radio New Zealand
**Individual Radio Journalist of the Year** **Peter Fowler - Radio New Zealand, National - Radio New Zealand**: Ian Telfer - Radio New Zealand, National - Radio New Zealand; Zachary Kerr - RadioLIVE, Auckland - MediaWorks Radio	

=== Best NZ Produced Musical Programme ===
**Best Music Feature** **Carmen: I Am Here, I Am Me - Gareth Watkins - Radio New Zealand, Concert - Radio New Zealand**: Shapeshifter Musical Chairs - Nick Atkinson & Ian Gordon - Radio New Zealand, National - Radio New Zealand; David Dallas: Behind the Scenes of Falling Into - Sam Wicks & Chris Keogh - Radio New Zealand, National - Radio New Zealand; The Sampler - Nick Bollinger - Radio New Zealand, National - Radio New Zealand	**Best Recorded Live Music Event** **Silver Scrolls 2013 - Nick Atkinson & Andre Upston - Radio New Zealand, National - Radio New Zealand**: HŌHEPA - David McCaw, Darryl Stack & Chris Keogh - Radio New Zealand, Concert - Radio New Zealand; Everything is Ka Pai - Tim Dodd, Andre Upston & Adrian Hollay - Radio New Zealand, Concert - Radio New Zealand
**Best Programmer of the Year** **Dallas Gurney - Newstalk ZB & Radio Sport, Network - The Radio Network**: Brad King - The Rock, Network - MediaWorks Radio; Craig Boddy - The Breeze, Wellington - MediaWorks Radio; Ian Avery - The Breeze, Network - MediaWorks Radio	

=== Best Promotion ===
**Best Network Radio Station Promotion** **Jase & Daves Bumper Boat Bonanza - Ben Humphrey, Leanne Hutchinson, Jason Winstanley, Jason Gunn, Dave Fitzgerald, Sharon Amataiti - Classic Hits, Network - The Radio Network**: The Edge Guinness World Record Skinny Dip - Dena Roberts, Casey Sullivan, Sarah Nickson-Clark - The Edge, Auckland - MediaWorks Radio; Justin Bieber - Jason Mac - The Rock, Network - MediaWorks Radio	**Best Single Market Radio Station Promotion** **Living With AJ, Chloe & Andy Ellis - Kally Gallop, Hayley Gillespie, Tim Dyer, AJ Funnell, Chloe Emirali, Andrew Ellis - Classic Hits, Christchurch - The Radio Network**: More FM Kids Choose a Wedding - Nichola Maclean, Kenneth Swan, Anna Richardson - 93.2 More FM, Taranaki - MediaWorks Radio; Casts 4 Kids 2 - Alisha Birrell - More FM, Gisborne - MediaWorks Radio
**Best Direct Client Campaign** **#SameSexWedding - Leon Wratt, Dena Roberts, Robert Dickey - The Edge, Auckland - MediaWorks Radio**: Fiji AIrways - Mid Air Matrimony - Shellee Arnold & Rebecca Dawson - More FM, Network - MediaWorks Radio; Hell Pizza Zombies From Hell Launch - Sarah Catran, Michaela Pickworth, Charlotte Cubitt - ZM, Hauraki & Flava, Network - The Radio Network	**Best Promotional Trailer** **Justin Bieber - Jason Mac & Grant Brodie - The Rock, Network - MediaWorks Radio**: Classic Hits '12 Days Of Christmas' - Aaron Watkinson - Classic Hits, Network - The Radio Network; Real Music - Jason Mac & Grant Brodie - The Rock, Network - MediaWorks Radio
**Best Agency Client Campaign** **Telecom Free WiFi Summer - Sarah Catran, Michaela Pickworth, Charlotte Cubitt - ZM, Network - The Radio Network**: Tui Lager Summer Simulator - Michaela Pickworth - Hauraki, Network - The Radio Network; Telecom Prepaid presents The Social Games - Leon Wratt, Robert Dickey, Dena Roberts, Fuchsia Davidson - The Edge, Auckland - MediaWorks Radio	**Best Multi Station Agency Campaign** **What Do You Care? Local Body Elections - Saatchi & Saatchi Auckland - Multi Station - Saatchi & Saatchi**: Going Digital - OMD Wellington - Multi Station - OMD Wellington; Drive Social - OMD Wellington - Multi Station - OMD Wellington
