= 2023 New Zealand Radio Awards =

- Awarded for: Excellence in radio broadcasting
- Country: New Zealand
- Presented by: Radio Broadcasters Association
- Website: radioawards.co.nz

The 2023 New Zealand Radio Awards are the awards for excellence in the New Zealand radio industry during 2022. It was the 46th New Zealand Radio Awards, recognising staff, volunteers and contractors in both commercial and non-commercial broadcasting.

The nominees were announced on 5 April 2023, with the award winners announced at a ceremony that was held on 1 June 2023.

== Winners & Finalists ==
Best Content Director / Content Team
- Winner: Will Maisey, Kris Edwards, Christian Boston (The Breeze Network)
- Finalists:
  - Jason Winstanley, Edward Swift, Michael Allan (Newstalk ZB Network)
  - Brad King, Jack Honeybone (The Rock Network)
  - Ross Flahive (ZM Network)
Best Show Producer or Producing Team - Music Show
- Winner: Braydon Priest (Auckland's Breakfast with Robert & Jeanette, The Breeze)
- Finalists:
  - Claudia Sykes, Ella Shepherd, Ben McDowell, Anastasia Loeffen (ZM's Bree & Clint, ZM Network)
  - Anna Henvest, Carwen Jones, Jared Pickstock (ZM's Fletch, Vaughan & Hayley, ZM Network)
  - Ben Humphrey, Joel Harrison (The Hits Breakfast with Jono & Ben, The Hits Network)
Best Show Producer or Producing Team - Talk Show
- Winners: Laura Beattie, Laura Cunningham, Anthony Milicich, Brooke Hobson (Heather du Plessis-Allan Drive, Newstalk ZB Network)
- Finalists:
  - Dan Goodwin (Marcus Lush Nights, Newstalk ZB Network)
  - Martin Gibson, Denise Garland, Susie Ferguson, Corin Dann, Jane Dunbar, Maree Corbett, Charlotte Cook, Katie Fitzgerald, Ben Strang, Daniel Gilhooly, Zoe Cartwright, Jemima Huston, Samuel Wat, Joel McManus, David Cohen, Tessa Guest, Karen Brown, Amber Leigh Woolf, Mahvash Ikram (Morning Report, RNZ National)
  - Michael Allan, Sam Carran, Glenn Hart (The Mike Hosking Breakfast, Newstalk ZB Network)
Best Station Imaging
- Winners: Grant Brodie, Hamish Phipps, Martijn Hehewerth, Casey Sullivan, Reagan White, Sin Howard, Richie Culph (The Edge Network)
- Finalists:
  - Josh Wood (More FM Network)
  - Alastair Boyes, Aaron Watkinson (The Hits Network)
  - Alistair Cockburn, Sam Harvey, Zoe Norton, Tom Harper, Claire Chellew, Brynee Wilson (ZM Network)
Best Station Trailer
- Winner: The Edge ATM (Grant Brodie, Hamish Phipps, The Edge Network)
- Finalists:
  - SabBATical (Glenn Dwight, Todd Campbell, Greg Prebble, Michael Andersen, Chris Ryan, Radio Hauraki Network)
  - The Edge Bieber Box (Grant Brodie, Hamish Phipps, The Edge Network)
  - ZM's Bonus Banger (Alistair Cockburn, Tom Harper, Claire Chellew, ZM Network)
Best Video - Short Form
- Winner: Rocktober - Bar Video (Claire Chellew, Kate Britten, Tom Harper, JD Hubbard, Angelina Grey, Matt Heath, Jeremy Wells, NZME Vision Team, John Phillips, Radio Hauraki Network)
- Finalists:
  - Rocktober - Booth Video (Claire Chellew, Kate Britten, Tom Harper, JD Hubbard, John Phillips, Jason Hoyte, Mike Minogue, Chris Key, Tracey Donaldson, NZME Vision Team, Radio Hauraki Network)
  - If You Laugh You're Out (Laura White, Dan Webby, Jayden King, Sharyn Casey, The Edge Network)
  - Beer & Pie July (Claire Chellew, Tom Harper, Kate Britten, JD Hubbard, Radio Hauraki Team, NZME Vision Team, John Phillips, Radio Hauraki Network)
Best Video - Long Form
- Winner: High & Die: The Fentanyl Problem (Simon Morrow, Wilhelmina Shrimpton, Tom Thexton, Today FM)
- Finalists:
  - Behind The Absolute Scenes: Episode Four - Eden Park Evicton (Joseph Durie, Joshua Hubbard, Jordan Whiu, Evan Paea, Sasha Sadlier, Leigh Hart, Jeremy Wells, Jason Hoyte, Matt Heath, Mike Lane, The ACC Network)
  - Behind The Absolute Scenes: Episode One - Popping The Cherry (Joseph Durie, Jordan Whiu, Evan Paea, Sasha Sadlier, Leigh Hart, Jeremy Wells, Jason Hoyte, Matt Heath, Joshua Hubbard, Mike Lane, The ACC Network)
  - Behind The Raids: Children At The Wheel (Simon Morrow, Wilhelmina Shrimpton, Tom Thexton, Today FM)
Best Network Station Promotion
- Winner: The Breeze Jingle (Will Maisey, Braydon Priest, Kris Edwards, Mel Dooley, The Breeze Network)
- Finalists:
  - Mai Morning Crew's 24 Hour Freethrows for Youthline (Arun Beard, Shanieka Trask, Philip Bell, Callum Butter, Penny Gillies, Brook Ruscoe, Tegan Yorwarth, Jordan Vahaakolo, Troy Scott, Nikora Price, K'Lee McNabb, Fame Teu, Randy Sjafrie, Brooke McAlavey, Bailey Palala, Glenn Scotson, Deschanel Toalepai, Cam Bannister, Mai FM Network)
  - More FM's $10,000 Gondolathon (Todd Fisher, Amy Collett, Lana Searle, Adam Percival, Gary McCormick, Chris Goodyear, Chris Bond, Amy Tempero, Josh Wood, Melissa Low, Daniel Blue, Jacquetta Hazlett, Matt Lamb, Carl Thompson, Amber Russell, More FM Network)
  - The Rock 2000 (Brad King, Jack Honeybone, Jacqueline Williams, Nikita Leck, Joe Baxendale, Penny Gillies, Richie Simpson, Raynor Perreau, The Rock Network)
Best Single Market Station Promotion
- Winner: Hilary & Fitzy's Canterbury Caravan Tour (Lauren White, Hiliary Schroeder, Josh Fogden, Hilary Muir, Dave Fitzgerald, Ryan Foster, Daniel Blue, Sarah van der Kley, Kate Coley, Georgia Bingham, Sarah Webster, The Breeze Canterbury)
- Finalists:
  - 100 Years of Radio Dunedin (Jackson Bray, Kally Gallop, Gordan Paine, Kris Edwards, Will Maisey, Jim Cowan, Savei Singh, Radio Dunedin)
  - More FM's Christmas Elf Scavenger Hunt (Lewie Tregoweth, Joel Palmer, Kristy Kong, More FM Queenstown, Wanaka)
  - The $5000 Northland Tour (John Markby, Angela Gordon, Tauha TeKahi, Tania Burgess, Sara O'Dwyer, More FM Northland)
Best Digital Content
- Winner: The Rock (Raynor Perreau, Michael Baker, Ricky Bannister, MediaWorks Digital Team, The Rock Network)
- Finalists:
  - The ACC (Joseph Durie, Tom Harper, The ACC Network)
  - The Edge (Ricky Bannister, Laura White, Ashlee Williams, Sophie Nathan, MediaWorks Digital Team, The Edge Network)
  - ZM Online (Megan Sagar, ZM Network)
Best Entertainment Podcast - Episodic
- Winner: The ACC Agenda Podcast (Matt Heath, James McOnie, Mike Lane, Joseph Durie, Adam Pomana, The ACC)
- Finalists:
  - Between Two Beers Podcast (Steven Holloway, Seamus Marten, Adam Pomana, Joseph Durie, The ACC)
  - Not for Radio (Duncan Heyde, Jay Reeve, Caleb Greaves, Tiegan Lilley, Cate Owen, Ben Donaldson, The Rock Network)
  - We Need To Talk with Toni Street (Toni Street, Celia Whitley, Heidi Roberts, Coast/iHeart Radio)
Best Entertainment Podcast - Seasonal
- Winner: Grey Areas (Phil Guyan, Petra Bagust, Mick Andrews, Josh Couch, Steph Soh Lavemaau, Sam Donkin, Love It Media/Rova)
- Finalists:
  - Did Titanic Sink? (Tim Batt, Carlo Ritchie, Justin Gregory, Tim Watkin, Chelsea Preston-Crayford, Blair Stagpoole, Eilish Wilson, RNZ)
  - Socrates Walks Into a Bar (Richard Culph, Tim Batt, Nick Rado, Ray O'Leary, Asher Bastion, MediaWorks/Rova)
  - What The F Was That (Lisa Diedricks, Dani Fennessy, Jayden King, Charlie McCubbine, Laura Spence, Cleo Tibbitts-Williams, MediaWorks/Rova)
Best Factual Podcast - Episodic
- Joint Winners:
  - Our Changing World (Claire Concannon, Ellen Rykers, William Saunders, Marc Chesterman, Phil Benge, Steve Burridge, Justin Gregory, Liz Garton, Tim Watkin, RNZ)
  - The Detail (Sharon Brettkelly, Emile Donovan, Sarah Robson, Bonnie Harrison, Mark Jennings, Jeremy Ansell, Rangi Powick, Blair Stagpoole, Flo Wilson, Adrian Hollay, Jeremy Veal, William Saunders, Marc Chesterman, Phil Benge, Tim Watkin, RNZ)
- Finalists:
  - Nau Mai Town (Justine Murray, Tim Watkin, RNZ)
  - The Morning Rumble (Andrew Mulligan, Nick Rado, John Day, Ryan Maguire, The Rock Network)
Best Factual Podcast - Seasonal
- Winner: The Aotearoa History Show (William Ray, Māni Dunlop, Duncan Smith, William Saunders, Phil Benge, Tim Watkin, RNZ)
- Finalists:
  - ASB Level Up Season One (Amelia MacDiarmid, Lauren Brown, Jessica Vella, Tegan Yorwarth, Jacqui Hopkins, Charlotte Hargreaves, MediaWorks/Rova)
  - Crimes NZ (Jesse Mulligan, Melita Tull, Tim Watkin, Charlie Dreaver, Sam Hollis, Ayana Piper-Healion, Liz Garton, RNZ)
  - The Elephant in the Bedroom (James Roque, Chye-Ling Huang, Ruby Reihana-Wilson, Kelly Gilbride, Julia Parnell, Tim Burnell, Tim Watkin, Megan Whelan, RNZ / Tahi FM)
Best Podcast by a Radio Show
- Winner: Rock Drive with Jay and Dunc (Duncan Heyde, Jay Reeve, Caleb Greaves, Tiegan Lilley, Cate Owen, Ben Donaldson, The Rock Network)
- Finalists:
  - The Matt & Jerry Show Podcast (Matt Heath, Jeremy Wells, Finn Caddie, Chris Goodwin, Anastasia Loeffen, Radio Hauraki)
  - The Mike Hosking Breakfast (Mike Hosking, Michael Allan, Sam Carran, Glenn Hart, Newstalk ZB Network)
  - ZM's Fletch, Vaughan & Hayley (Jared Pickstock, Carl Fletcher, Vaughan Smith, Hayley Sproull, Anna Henvest, Carwen Jones, ZM Network)
The Blackie Award
- Winner: Rog's 30th Anniversary (Roger Farrelly, Bryce Casey, Andrew Mulligan, Mel Abbot, Mitch Farr, Raynor Perreau, Ryan Maguire, The Rock Network)
- Finalists:
  - Hayley's Version: We Didn't Start The Fire (Hayley Sproull, Vaughan Smith, Carl Fletcher, ZM Network)
  - Marcus Lush Nights - Brian Can You Hear Me? (Marcus Lush, Dan Goodwin, Newstalk ZB Network)
  - Meg's Blind Portrait (Meg Mansell, Guy Mansell, Nickson Clark, Eli Matthewson, Steph Monks, Callum Payne, Ricky Bannister, The Edge Network)
Best Music Network Breakfast Show
- Winner: ZM's Fletch, Vaughan & Hayley (Carl Fletcher, Vaughan Smith, Hayley Sproull, Anna Henvest, Carwen Jones, Jared Pickstock, ZM Network)
- Finalists:
  - The Breakfast Club (Lana Searle, Adam Percival, Gary McCormick, Amy Collett, Chris Bond, Chris Goodyear, Christian Boston, More FM Network)
  - The Morning Rumble (Roger Farrelly, Andrew Mulligan, Bryce Casey, Mel Abbot, Ryan Maguire, Guy Mansell, Mitch Farr, The Rock Network)
  - The Hits Breakfast with Jono & Ben (Jono Pryor, Ben Boyce, Ben Humphrey, Joel Harrison, The Hits Network)
Best Music Network Host
- Winner: Robert Scott (The Breeze Network)
- Finalists:
  - Sean Hill (The Edge Network)
  - Charlotte Ryan (RNZ National)
  - Tracey Donaldson (Radio Hauraki Network)
Best Music Network Team
- Winners: Jay-Jay & Flynny (Jay-Jay Feeney, Paul Flynn, David Rybinski, George Smith, Matthew Pledger, Amy Collett, More FM Network)
- Finalists:
  - Rock Drive with Jay & Dunc (Duncan Heyde, Jay Reeve, Caleb Greaves, Tiegan Lilley, Brad King, Jack Honeybone, The Rock Network)
  - ZM's Bree & Clint (Bree Tomasei, Clint Roberts, Claudia Sykes, Ella Shepherd, Ben McDowell, Anastasia Loeffen, ZM Network)
  - The Hits Drive with Brad & Laura (Brad Watson, Laura McGoldrick, Tayla Montoya, Emily Twohig, Alex Lansdown, The Hits Network)
Best Local Team Show
- Winners: Northland's Breakfast Club with John, Flash and Toast (John Markby, Angela Gordon, Tauha Te Kani, Tania Burgess, Christian Boston, More FM Northland)
- Finalists:
  - Manawatu's Breakfast Club with Mike & Gareth (Mike West, Gareth Pringle, Jason Royal, David Rybinski, More FM Manawatu)
  - The Hits Breakfast with Callum & P (Callum Procter, Patrina Roche, The Hits Dunedin)
  - Auckland's Breakfast with Robert & Jeanette (Robert Rakete, Jeanette Thomas, Will Maisey, Braydon Priest, The Breeze Auckland)
Best Local Music Host

Winner: Amber Russell Hiliary Schroeder (More FM Canterbury) Finalists:

  - Lauren Mabbett (The Hits Bay of Plenty)
  - Blair Kiddey Daniel Tipping (The Breeze Nelson)
  - Blair Dowling (The Hits Waikato)
Best Show - Non Surveyed Market

Winners: Bevan for Breakfast (Bevan Chapman, Rodger Clamp, Dave Rybinski, More FM Gisborne & Wairoa) Finalists:

  - Central Otago's Breakfast Club with Joel (Joel Palmer, Rodger Clamp, David Rybinski, More FM Queenstown & Wanaka)
  - Gibbo's Drive Show (Hamish Wilde, Sun FM)
  - More FM Breakfast with Andrew Leiataua (Andrew Leiataua, Chelsea Ross, David Rybinski, Rodger Clamp, Marc Everson, More FM Taupo)
Best Talk Presenter - Breakfast or Drive

Winner: The Mike Hosking Breakfast (Mike Hosking, Michael Allan, Sam Carran, Glenn Hart, Newstalk ZB Network) Finalists:

  - Heather du Plessis-Allan (Heather du Plessis-Allan, Laura Beattie, Laura Cunningham, Anthony Milicich, Brooke Hobson, Newstalk ZB Network)
  - Lisa Owen Checkpoint (RNZ National)
  - Susie Ferguson, Corin Dann Morning Report (RNZ National)
Best Talk Presenter - Non-Breakfast or Drive

Winner: Marcus Lush Nights (Marcus Lush, Dan Goodwin, Newstalk ZB Network) Finalists:

  - Early Edition with Kate Hawkesby (Kate Hawkesby, Alexander Goldsmith, Newstalk ZB Network)
  - Simon Barnett & James Daniels Afternoons (Simon Barnett, James Daniels, Tyler Adams, Andrew Topping, Newstalk ZB Network)
  - Saturday Morning (Kim Hill, RNZ National)
Best New Broadcaster - Journalist

Joint Winners:

  - Jason Walls (Newstalk ZB Network)
  - Jimmy Ellingham (RNZ National)

Finalists:

  - Ella Stewart (RNZ National)
  - Kirsty Frame (RNZ National)
Best New Broadcaster - Off-Air

Winner: Joshua Hubbard (NZME) Finalists:

  - Caleb Greaves (The Rock Network)
  - Joel Harrison (The Hits Network & The ACC)
  - Laura White (The Edge Network)
Best New Broadcaster - On-Air

Winner: Meg Wyatt (ZM & The Hits Network) Finalists:

  - Liam Rassie (More FM Coromandel)
  - Matthew Pledger (More FM Network)
  - Sophie Nathan (The Edge Network)
Best News or Sports Journalist

Winner: Wilhelmina Shrimpton (Today FM) Finalists:

  - Anusha Bradley (RNZ National)
  - Lydia Lewis (RNZ National)
  - Samantha Olley (RNZ National)
Best News Story - Team Coverage

Winner: War in Ukraine (Today FM) Finalists:

  - 2022 Parliament Protest (Newstalk ZB Network)
  - Death of HM The Queen (Today FM)
  - The Death of Queen Elizabeth II (Newstalk ZB Network)
Best Newsreader

Winner: Niva Retimanu (Newstalk ZB Network) Finalists:

  - Adam Cooper (Newstalk ZB Network)
  - Angie Skerrett (Today FM)
  - Raylene Ramsay (Newstalk ZB Network)
Best Sports Reader, Presenter or Commentator

Winner: Jason Pine Andy McDonnell (Newstalk ZB Network) Finalists:

  - Adam Cooper (Newstalk ZB Wellington)
  - D'Arcy Waldegrave Andy Duff (Newstalk ZB Network)
  - Elliott Smith (Newstalk ZB Network)
Best Sports Story - Team Coverage

Winner: Birmingham 2022 Commonwealth Games (Elliott Smith, Malcolm Jordan, Nick Bewley, Jason Pine, Andy McDonnell, Andrew Alderson, Mark Kelly, Angus Mabey, Kate Wells, Newstalk ZB & Gold Sport) Finalists:

  - Ian Foster - The All Blacks Coaching Saga (Newstalk ZB Network)
  - Marc Peard Sports - Road To The World Cup Final (Matthew Pledger, Brad Lewis, Marc Peard, Today FM)
  - The Black Ferns Rugby World Cup (Newstalk ZB Network)
Best Client Promotion/Activation

Winner: The Hits Jono & Ben's $10,000 Chip Pic with Heartland Chips (Harriett Whiting, Ben Humphrey, Jono Pryor, Ben Boyce, Joel Harrison, Alastair Boyes, Jordan Whiu, Tom Dyton, Joshua, The Hits Network) Finalists:

  - Matt & Jerry Live from the Hot Spring Spa (Black Clash) (Kate Britten, Matt Heath, Jeremy Wells, Anastasia Loeffen, Finn Caddie, Radio Hauraki Network)
  - Prezzy Card Sin Bin (The Morning Rumble, Sophie Currie, Rykah Hadaway, Jack Honeybone, Brad King, Jacqueline Williams, Joe Baxendale, Jess Taylor, The Rock Network)
  - The Edge $50K Flatmate with Dosh (Finlay Robertson, Caitlin Coffey, Mitchell Fulton, Matt Lamb, The Edge Breakfast, The Edge Full Noise Workday, The Edge Afternoons, The Edge Nights, Mitchell Ley, Laura White, Casey Sullivan, Hamish Phipps, Sidney Collett, Michael Baker, Ricky Bannister, Carl Thompson, Clare Howat, Grant Brodie, The Edge Network)
Best Marketing Campaign

Winner: Jono & Ben Kids Call the Shots (Jacqui Davis, Gemma Vovchenko, Xanthe Williams, Emily Hancox, Joseph Senior, Jono Pryor, Ben Boyce, The Hits Network) Finalists:

  - Beer & Pie July (Claire Chellew, Kate Britten, Nic Adams, Radio Hauraki Network)
  - Gold Sport Commonwealth Games (Gemma Vovchenko, Sarah Swanton, Graham Stride, Kristin Rohan, Sidak Malhi, Gold Sport)
  - The Edge $50K Flatmate (Sidney Collett, Anton Herbert, Lee Gilmour, Caitlin Coffey, Mitch Fulton, The Edge Network)
Best Sponsorship & Partnership

Winner: Billy Joel on The Breeze (Will Maisey, Ange Wedekind, Tiffany Montgomery, The Breeze Network) Finalists:

  - DB Export & The Alternative Commentary Collective (Mike Lane, Courtney Ennor, Joseph Durie, Lauren McClung, Sarah Catran, Madeson West, Sam Forrest, Shiloh Holder, Hannah Gray, Monique Gibson, Eddie Commons, Kevin Goode, The ACC)
  - Survive the Drive (Sam West, Amelia MacDiarmid, Charlotte Hargreaves, Hayley Overton, Will Maisey, Tiffany Montgomery, Rebecca Fleet, The Breeze Network)
  - The Hits Jono & Ben's 'Out of this World' Mash Up Heartland Chips (Harriett Whiting, Ben Humphrey, Ben Boyce, Jono Pryor, Joel Harrison, Jordan Whiu, Joshua Hubbard, Tom Dyton, Alastair Boyes, The Hits Network)
Best Effective Commercial Campaign

Winner: Does it do what a Daikin does? (Graham Dolan, Arron Smith, Holly McLaughlin, Nathalie O'Toole, Emma Freeman, Gerald Stewart, NZME) Finalists:

  - ASB Business Insight (Anna Lloyd, Lauren McClung, Maggie West, Jessica Boell, Tasmin Bradley, Matthew Carney, Madison Wheeler, Newstalk ZB Network)
  - Kiwi Hire Group (Ronnie Mackie, Loudmouth Productions)
  - Yellow - Today's the Day (Graham Dolan, Arron Smith, Holly McLaughlin, Sandy Kilgour, Gordon Bayne, Tess Jamieson-Karaha, Alana O'Neill, Will Parsonson, NZME)
Best Creative Commercial Campaign

Winner: NRC - Road Safety Strategy - 2022 (Alastair Barran, Chris Hurring, MediaWorks) Finalists:

  - Drive Safe West Coast - Distraction Series (Glenn Dwight, Anna-Marie Thompson, James Irwin, Toiroa Williams, NZME)
  - Te Rangihaeata Gambling (Tracy O'Halloran, Nicole McCarthy, Leanne McDonald, Toiroa Williams, John Martin, Tess Jamieson-Karaha, NZME Hawke's Bay)
  - Water Safety - In the Water (Richard Thorburn, Richard Alexander, MediaWorks)
Best Commercial Production

Winner: NRC - BPM (Chris Hurring, Alastair Barran, MediaWorks) Finalists:

  - Coast Chem Dry - A Carpet Will Rise (Daniel Wood, Giverny Penny, Rew Shearer, Stephen Lovatt, NZME Greymouth)
  - NRC - Never Give Up (Chris Hurring, Alistair Barran, Jasper Hurring, MediaWorks)
  - Water Safety - Get Wet Waikato (Richard Thorburn, Richard Alexander, MediaWorks)
Best Single Commercial

Winner: NRC - Never Give Up (Alastair Barran, Chris Hurring, Zoe-Harper Barran, MediaWorks) Finalists:

  - Noizeeland - Jingle Famous (Alastair Barran, Chris Hurring, Glen Stuart, MediaWorks)
  - NRC - BPM (Alistair Barran, Chris Hurring, MediaWorks)
  - Te Rangihaeata Gambling - Lost Family (Tracy O'Halloran, Nicole McCarthy, Leanne McDonald, Toiroa Williams, NZME Hawke's Bay)
Best Voice Talent

Winner: Hamish Nixon (MediaWorks) Finalists:

  - Tom Harper (ZM Network)
  - Sin Howard (The Edge Network)
  - Hayley D'Ath (NZME)
Sales Team of the Year

Winners: NZME Christchurch (Matt Bowness, Anna McKenzie, Ben Harris, Danielle Torr, Chloe Hebden, Amy Green, Jimmy Farrant, Ian Avery, Lynne-Puddy Greenwood, Esther Hall, Adam Miller, Victoria McArthur, Sabia Harrington) Finalists:

  - NZME Agency (Greg McCrea, Angie Russell, Anna Lawson, Anna Lloyd, Ben Sullivan, Bridget Welsh, Carly Harris, Charlotte Franklin, Chloe Hebden, Chris Rudd, Danielle Torr, Ella Bain, Gareth McDonald, Georgia van Koningsveld, Greg Plant, Jenna Coffey, Jessica Landar, Hayley Braisby, Jared De Wet, Kelly Hedley, Lauren McClung, Lexi Merton, Madeson West, Maggie Campbell, Matt Bowness, Nikki Stevens, Patricia Posadas, Petrea Sefton-Roche, Sarah Chan, Sarah de Villiers, Sarah Yetton, Shelley Sims, Vivian Mcfadzean)
  - MediaWorks Auckland Direct Sales Team (Dan Dalton, Tonia Dixon, Tom Ivamy)
  - NZME Auckland Direct Sales (Tom Gray, Chelsea Norman, Tweenie Hayward-Brown, Fiona Cording, Kath Gola)
Associated Craft Award

Winners: MediaWorks Partnerships Team (Angela Wedekind, Briana Lonsdale, Tayla McVey, Sara Pilkington, Sidney Collett, Chris Lloyd, Paige Faigaa) Finalists:

  - NZME Commercial Integration Team (Robert Dickey, Danielle Tolich, Aileen Lau, Jessie Matheson, Nathan Hart, Emma Freeman, James Valentine, Larissa O'Reilly, Petra Ashcroft, Lauren Simpkins, Neve Duff, Georgina Batten, Brenna Creahan, Bryce Morris)
  - MediaWorks Trade Marketing Team (Jessica James, Lantana Francis, Alex Kenny, Brad Baird, Sam Curtis, Ellie Martinovich, Aisha Johan)
  - NZME Trade Marketing Team (Michelle Keighley, Leticia Fitzgerald, Kat Hicks, Helen Welch, Aishia Healey)
Best Community Campaign

Winner: Fill The Bus (Paul Hickey, Hamish Gleeson, The Hits Rotorua) Finalists:

  - George FM 28 Hour Give Back 2 Back (Leigh Dolbear, Tammy Davis, Mouse Varcoe, Ben Whitehead, Sidney Collett, Corbin Baxter, Sam Warlow, Dean Campbell, Shawn Cleaver, George FM Network)
  - Jono & Ben's Sausage Sizzle Tour of NZ (Harriett Whiting, Ben Humphrey, Ben Boyce, Jono Pryor, Joel Harrison, Aaron Watkinson, Lauren Simpkins, Jordan Whiu, Tom Dyton, The Hits Network)
  - The Morning Rumble, I Am Hope Campaign (Roger Farrelly, Bryce Casey, Andrew Mulligan, Mel Abbot, Ryan Maguire, Mitch Farr, Raynor Perreau, Jacqueline Williams, Guy Mansell, The Rock Network)
Network / Metropolitan Station of the Year

Winner: Newstalk ZB (NZME) Finalists:

  - The Rock (Brad King, Jack Honeybone, MediaWorks)
  - The Breeze (Will Maisey, MediaWorks)
  - ZM (Ross Flahive, NZME)
Local Station of the Year

Winner: One Double X (Glenn Smith, Chris Ford, Christine Tulloch, Colin Magee, Doug Shaw, Jessica Doney, Josh Stokes, Judi Thomson, Kai Emsley, Kieran Watkins, LJ Dobbin, Mary Barnett, Paora Manuel, Rebecca Young, Tracy-Lee Carmichael, Tasman Amos, William Greenway, Abby Dickinson, Anna Glibbery, Mikayla Morris, Radio Bay of Plenty) Finalists:

  - More FM Gisborne & Wairoa (Debra Cresswell, Belinda Francis, Alisha Birrell, Bevan Chapman, Gisborne & Wairoa)
  - More FM Manawatu (Team 92.2 MoreFM Manawatu, Julian Donovan, Manawatu)
  - More FM Northland (John Markby, Angela Gordon, Tauha Te Kani, Tania Burgess, Becks Mercer, Northland)

== Special awards ==
Sir Paul Holmes Broadcaster of the Year: Mike Hosking (Newstalk ZB)

Outstanding Contribution to Radio: Barry Soper (Newstalk ZB)

Services to Broadcasting: George Moungatonga (Pacific Media Network) Phil Quinney (NZME) Roger Farrelly (The Rock Network) Vicki McKay (RNZ)
