= 2016 New Zealand Radio Awards =

- Awarded for: Excellence in radio broadcasting
- Country: New Zealand
- Presented by: Radio Broadcasters Association
- Website: radioawards.co.nz

The 2016 New Zealand Radio Awards were the awards for excellence in the New Zealand radio industry during 2015. It was the 39th New Zealand Radio Awards, recognising staff, volunteers and contractors in both commercial and non-commercial broadcasting.

== Winners and nominees ==
This is a list of nominees, with winners in bold.

=== Associated Craft Award ===
**Associated Craft Award**

**Matt Clouston - Designer - NZME All stations**

- Jovan Milovic - Graphic Designer - MediaWorks Integration
- NZME Technology - Radio Technology Team - NZME Technology
- John Galliers - Creative Head of Radio Marketing - NZME All stations

=== Best Children's Programme ===
**Best Children's Programme**

**The Crazy Christmas Kids Show - Phil Guyan, Frank Ritchie, Catherine Sylvester, Levi Guyan, Daryl Habraken, Alex Chapman, Pat Brittenden, Julia Bloore - Newstalk ZB & Radio Sport - Christian Broadcasting Association & NZME**

- The Great Big Kids' Show - Suzy Cato, Trevor Plant, Phil Yule, Keira Jonkers - Treehut Limited
- Space Station Kiwi - Marchell Linzey - Otago Access Radio

=== Best Community Access Programmes ===
**Best Music Programme in Any Language** **Space Station Kiwi - Marchell Linzey - Otago Access Radio**: Degrees Of Sound - Glenn Teasdale, Steve Smith, Grace Millar - PlainsFM; Lekker Luister - Karisma Nel - 89.0 Free FM	**Best Spoken/ Informational English Language Programme** **Kapija - Bernard Jervis, Michael Wilson - Access Radio Wairarapa**: Hashtag Radio - Phid McAwesome, Charis McAwesome, Matthew Bartley - Free FM & Hashtag ME; Sounds Catholic - Ken Joblin - Plains FM

=== Best Community Campaign ===
**Best Community Campaign**

**NZBCF Pink Star Walk - Laura Smith, James Powell, Ben Humphrey - The Hits Network**

- The Hits Restricted View - Kate Britten, Anna Strachan, Paul Flynn - The Hits Network
- The Hits Toy Run - Matt Davy, Blair Dowling, Brian Hall - The Hits Waikato

=== Best Content ===
**Best Content Director** **Christian Boston - More FM Network**: Will Maisey - The Breeze Wellington; Brad King - The Rock Network	**Best Show Producer** **Emily Winstanley - The Mike Hosking Breakfast - Newstalk ZB Network**: Chris Bond - Si & Gary - More FM Network; Daniel Webby - Jono & Ben Drive - The Rock Network; Duncan Heyde - Jono & Ben Drive Content - The Rock Network
**Best Video** **Jono & Ben's Castle Crusade - Oliver Green, Jono Pryor, Ben Boyce, Bronwynn Bakker, Jordan Watson, Duncan Heyde, Daniel Webby - The Rock Network**: April Fools - Vaughan Smith, Carl Fletcher, Megan Sellers, Jason Hawkins, Polly Harding, James Marbeck, Caitlin Marett - ZM Network; The Edge Afternoons with Guy, Sharyn & Clint - Noel Falkner, Guy Williams, Sharyn Casey, Clinton Roberts, Chang Hung, Casey Sullivan - The Edge Network; Brad Reaches Breaking Point - Cam Bakker, Bronwynn Bakker, Jono Pryor, Ben Boyce, Adam Stevenson, Stacey Wouters, Brad King - The Rock Network	

=== Best Maori Language Broadcast ===
**Best Maori Language Broadcast**

**Pupuke Te Hihiri Show - Te Poihi Campbell - Te Korimako o Taranaki**

- Ta Apirana Ngata Memorial Lectures Series 2015 - Darylene Rogers, Paora Brooking - Radio Ngati Porou
- Te Mahuri Totara - Tumamao Harawira - Radio Waatea - UMA Broadcasting

=== Best Marketing Campaign ===
**Best Marketing Campaign**

**More FM Dancing with the Stars Campaign - Claire Chellew, Jo Marsh, Melissa Low, Gary Pointon, Simon Barnett - More FM Network**

- The World Famous Rock 1000 - Stacy Flahive, Jon Chapman-Smith, Mike Chapman - The Rock Network
- One Picture Is Worth A Thousand Words - Lee Gilmour, Katie Mills, Emily Hancox - Magic Network

=== Best Music Feature ===
**Best Music Feature**

**Anatomy Of A Song - Joshua Moore, Rachel Morton, James Meharry, Jonny Pipe - RDU 98.5 FM**

- Jon Toogood - Planet of Sound - Jon Toogood - Hauraki Network
- TUNEiversity - Alex Behan - Hauraki Network

=== Best New Broadcaster ===
**Best New Broadcaster - Off-Air** **Ben French - Producer - MediaWorks Auckland**: Ryan Foster - Breakfast Producer - Mai FM; Alex Braae - Online Editor - Newstalk ZB & Radio Sport Network	**Best New Broadcaster - On-Air** **Charlie Bristow - Newstalk ZB & Radio Sport Network**: Tom Furniss - The Rock Network; Georgia Burt - ZM Network

=== Best News ===
**Best Journalist - News or Sports** **Lloyd Burr - RadioLIVE Network**: Katarina Williams - RadioLIVE Network; Alex Mason - Newstalk ZB Network	**Best Newsreader** **Bernadine Oliver-Kirby - Newstalk ZB Network** **Hilary Barry - RadioLIVE Network**: Niva Retimanu - Newstalk ZB Network
**Best Team Coverage of a News Story** **Lomu RadioLIVE News - RadioLIVE News & Drive Team - RadioLIVE Network**: The Paris Bombings - Newstalk ZB Team - Newstalk ZB Network; Window Washers - Sanjesh Narain, Mehak Vasisht, Shalen Shandil - Radio Tarana Auckland	

=== Best On Air ===
**Best Music Breakfast Show - Network** **Jay-Jay, Mike & Dom - Jay-Jay Harvey, Mike Puru, Dominic Harvey, Carl Thompson, Kerry Gregory, Sophie Hallwright - The Edge Network**: Si & Gary - Simon Barnett, Gary McCormick, Chris Bond, Samantha Baxter, Jason Royal, Christian Boston - More FM Network; Fletch, Vaughan & Megan - Vaughan Smith, Carl Fletcher, Megan Sellers, James Marbeck, Caitlin Marett - ZM Network	**Best Music Breakfast Show - Single Surveyed Market** **The Hits Breakfast - Dunedin - Callum Procter, Patrina Roche - The Hits Dunedin**: Mike West in the Morning - Mike West, Gareth Pringle, Johnelle Hosking, Renee Pink - More FM Manawatu; Steve & Kath - Steve Joll, Kath Bier, Will Maisey - The Breeze Wellington
**Best Music Non-Breakfast Host or Team - Network** **Jono & Ben Drive - Jono Pryor, Ben Boyce, Duncan Heyde, Daniel Webby, Bronwynn Bakker - The Rock Network**: ZM's Jase & PJ - Jason Hawkins, Polly Harding, Alex Perigo - ZM Network; The Edge Afternoons with Guy, Sharyn & Clint - Guy Williams, Sharyn Casey, Clint Roberts, Chang Hung - The Edge Network	**Best Music Host or Team - Single Non-Surveyed Market** **Special Recognition: Mark Eagle - Sun FM**
**Best Music Non-Breakfast Host or Team - Single Surveyed Market** **Stu Smith and the Easy Drive Home - Stu Smith - The Breeze Wellington**: Katrina Smith and the Easy Work Day - Katrina Smith - The Breeze Wellington	**Best Talk Presenter/s - All Markets** **Paul Henry - Paul Henry, Sarah Bristow - RadioLIVE Network**: The Mike Hosking Breakfast - Mike Hosking, Emily Winstanley, Glenn Hart - Newstalk ZB Network; KPMG Early Edition with Rachel Smalley - Rachel Smalley, Laura Smith - Newstalk ZB Network
**Best Talkback Presenter/s - All Markets** **The Leighton Smith Show - Leighton Smith, Carolyn Leaney - Newstalk ZB Network**: Canterbury Mornings - Chris Lynch, Tyler Adams - Newstalk ZB Christchurch; The Tim Fookes Morning Show - Tim Fookes, Philippa Ormrod - Newstalk ZB Wellington	

=== Best Promotion ===
**Best Client Digital Execution** **Mad Butcher 'Mad Fans' - Matt Headland, Matt Bowness, Monique Pierce, Steph Vercoe, Arron Smith, Jenny Kong, Jovan Milovic - MediaWorks Network**: The Full Eighty Cheers to KFC - Darryl Paton, Cam Burns, Nathan Rarere, Matt Tattle, Daniel Cummings, Daniel Thorn - Rock, Mai, Edge - National; #LuckyJockeys - Mike Lane, Phoebe Turner, Matt Clouston, Joe Durie - Radio Hauraki & The Alternative Commentary Collective Network	**Best Multi Station Client Campaign** **#LuckyJockeys - Mike Lane, Phoebe Turner, Matt Clouston, Joe Durie - Radio Hauraki & The Alternative Commentary Collective Network**: 2degrees Play the Bridge - Sarah Catran, Lucy Winefield, Phoebe Turner, Trent Hall, Matt Clouston - NZME Network; Heineken Briefcase Challenge - Cam Bakker, Chris Lloyd, Adam Stevenson, Bronwynn Bakker, Jono Pryor, Ben Boyce - The Rock, Radio Live & George
**Best Network Station Promotion** **The Edge Four Strangers & A Wedding - Dena Roberts, Casey Sullivan, Jay-Jay Harvey, Dom Harvey, Mike Puru - The Edge Network**: Guy, Sharyn and Clint: The Pigeon Song - Guy Williams, Sharyn Casey, Clint Roberts, Chang Hung, Paul Williams, Malo Luafutu, Casey Sullivan, Dena Roberts, Daniel Cummings, Noel Faulkner, Michael Kooge, Rodger Clamp, Ryan Rathbone, Stephannie Munro - The Edge Network; The Princes Pub Quiz Quest - Ryan Maguire, Lana Searle, Jason Gunn, Gary Pointon, Melissa Low - More FM Network	**Best Single Market Station Promotion** **#School of Ed - Leanne Hutchinson, Melissa Low, Hale Speedy, Christian Boston - More FM Network**: The Face of Wellington - Will Maisey, Steve Joll, Kath Bier, Collette Kelly - The Breeze Wellington; Big Prize Surprise - Matt Davy, Brian Hall - ZM Waikato
**Best Single Station Client Campaign** **Jono V Ben - Cam Bakker, Jono Pryor, Ben Boyce, Duncan Heyde, Daniel Webby, Bronwynn Bakker, Stacey Wouters, Chris Lloyd, Adam Stevenson - The Rock Network**: ZM's Jelly Tipster - Sarah Catran, Vaughan Smith, Carl Fletcher, Megan Sellers, James Marbeck, Caitlin Marret, Trent Hall, Matt Clouston, Phoebe Turner - ZM Network; AMI CEO For a Day - Cam Bakker, Jono Pryor, Ben Boyce, Duncan Heyde, Daniel Webby, Bronwynn Bakker, Stacey Wouters - The Rock Network	**Best Station Digital Execution** **ZB's Two Cows - Steph Rowe, Emily Winstanley - ZB Network**: ZM's Beiber-Q - ZM Brand Engagement Team - ZM Network; Justin Bieber Intimate & Acoustic in NZ - Casey Sullivan, Dena Roberts, Samuel Fullick, Hamish Goodall - The Edge Network
**Best Client Activation** **Noel Leeming "The Spatula" - Kate Britten, Kate Jones, Lucy Winefield, Trent Hall, Will Johnston - The Hits Bay of Plenty**: Energy Lives Where - Hiliary Schroeder, Cam Bakker, Guy Williams, Sharyn Casey, Clint Roberts, Tim Cairns, Nikki Flint - The Edge Network; $10K Tuesday - Cam Bakker, Jono Pryor, Ben Boyce, Duncan Heyde, Daniel Webby, Bronwynn Bakker, Stacey Wouters - The Rock Network	

=== Best Radio Creative ===
**Best Commercial Voice Talent** **Leilani Fokelau - MediaWorks Auckland**: Richard Culph - MediaWorks Network; Sarah Webster - MediaWorks Canterbury	**Best Creative Commercial/s - Single or Campaign** **Spookers Halloween - It's Your Call - Alastair Barran - The Edge & Mai FM Auckland**: Kiwi Rail - Expect Trains - Chris Howden - NZME Nationwide; Busted - Dezley Scott-Davidson - The Rock Auckland
**Best Effective Commercial/s - Single or Campaign** **Spookers Halloween - It's Your Call - Alastair Barran - The Edge & Mai FM Auckland**: All Blacks Tours - Paul McIlroy - NZME Nationwide; Oi - Dezley Scott-Davidson - More FM & George FM Auckland	**Best Jingle or Jingle Package** **Harbour Fish - Darin To'o & Gareth Curtis - NZME Dunedin**: Load Up - Scott Armstrong - NZME Nationwide; PK Furniture - The Price Killer - Rew Shearer & Leroy Clampitt - NZME Nationwide

=== Best Radio Website ===
**Best Radio Website**

**www.theedge.co.nz - Hamish Goodall, Samuel Fullick, Stephanie Munro, Oliver Green, Mel Chico, Rachael Wotherspoon, Chanel Prime, Michael Baker - The Edge Network**

- www.zmonline.com - Lucy Carthew - ZM Network
- www.therock.net.nz - Michael Baker, Chanel Potaka, Amber Holyoake - The Rock Network

=== Best Spoken Programmes ===
**Best Daily or Weekly Series** **KPMG Early Edition with Rachel Smalley - Rachel Smalley & Laura Smith - Newstalk ZB Network**: This Day, Paul Henry - Paul Henry, Sarah Bristow, Phil Yule, Kate Harley, Jessica Rowe - RadioLIVE Network; Saturday Morning with Jack Tame - Jack Tame & Helen McCarthy - Newstalk ZB Network	**Best Documentary** **ANZAC Centenary Tribute with Leighton Smith - Josh Couch - Christian Broadcasting Association & NZME**: The Refugee Crisis - Rachel Smalley & Laura Smith - Newstalk ZB Network; Born to Defy Rugby - Dale Budge, Chris Newbold, Brian Kelly - Radio Sport Network

=== Best Sport ===
**Best Sports Presenter/Commentator** **Kent Johns - Radio Sport Network**: The Alternative Commentary Collective (ACC) - Mike Lane, Jeremy Wells, Matt Heath, Leigh Hart, Jason Hoyte, Paul Ford, Lee Baker - The Alternative Commentary Collective Network; Rikki Swannell - Radio Sport & Newstalk ZB Network; Tony Veitch - Newstalk ZB Network	**Best Sports Story/Event** **Cricket World Cup 2015 - Bryan Waddle, Brenton Vannisselroy, Daniel McHardy, Allen McLaughlin, Callum Procter, Malcolm Jordan, Gareth Lischner, Rikki Swannell, Guy Heveldt - Radio Sport Network**: Rugby World Cup 2015 - Nigel Yalden, Elliott Smith, Simon Doull, Andrew Mulligan, Marc Peard, Mike Hosking, Emily Winstanley, Jason Winstanley, Tony Veitch - Radio Sport & Newstalk ZB Network; Rugby World Cup 2015 - All Blacks Create History - John Day, Chris Forster, John McNeill, Geoff Bryan, Tim Summerville, Jordyn McLean, Nick Bewley, Richard Wain, Cameron Packer, Kevin Hercock, Andy Stenton, Katarina Williams, Duncan Garner, Mark Sainsbury, James Coleman, Tim Sisarich, Jana Rangooni, Melanie Jones - RadioLIVE Network

=== Best Technical Production ===
**Best Promotional Trailer** **ZM's Radioke - Maroon 5 in Tokyo - Kieran Bell - ZM Network**: Taylor Swift Shop Rock Launch Trailer - Josh Wood - More FM Network; ZM's Top 100 of 2015 - Kieran Bell - ZM Network	**Commercial Production** **Northland Regional Council - Texting - Chris Hurring - Mai FM Northland**: Northland Regional Council - Drugs - Chris Hurring - Mai FM Northland; NZTA Far North - Why Do You Speed? - Chris Hurring - Mai FM Northland
**Station Imaging** **Grant Brodie - The Edge Network** **Joe Baxendale - The Rock Network**: Kieran Bell - ZM Network	

=== Sales Team of the Year ===
**Metropolitan Sales Team of the Year** **MediaWorks Wellington - Wellington Sales Team - MediaWorks**: NZME Network Auckland - Alex Larsen & Sales Team - NZME Network; NZME Network Auckland - Nic Hurman & Sales Team - NZME Network	**Regional or Provincial Sales Team of the Year** **MediaWorks Waikato - Waikato Sales Team - MediaWorks Waikato**: MediaWorks Southern Lakes - Southern Lakes Sales Team - MediaWorks Southern Lakes; NZME Hawkes Bay - Hawkes Bay Sales Team - NZME Hawkes Bay

=== Station of the Year ===
**Station of the Year - Network** **Newstalk ZB - Steve Kyte - Newstalk ZB Network**: More FM - Christian Boston - More FM Network; The Rock - Brad King - The Rock Network	**Station of the Year - Non-Surveyed Market** **Radio 1XX - Glenn Smith - Radio 1XX**: More FM, Taupo - Penny Lyons & Bryn Ingham - More FM Taupo; Radio Wanaka - Mike Regal - Radio Wanaka
**Station of the Year - Surveyed Market** **92.1 More FM Canterbury - Ben Harris & Christian Boston - More FM Canterbury**: More FM, Manawatu - Willie Furnell - More FM Manawatu; The Breeze, Wellington - Tim Lockhart & Will Maisey - The Breeze Wellington	**Iwi Station of the Year** **Special Recognition: Tumeke FM - Te Reo Irirangi o Te Manuka Tutahi**

=== 'The Blackie' (Award) ===
'**The Blackie' (Award)**

**Hauraki Breakfast - Matt Heath, Jeremy Wells, Laura McGoldrick, Chris Goodwin - Hauraki Network**

- Jono & Ben's Castle Crusade - Jono Pryor, Ben Boyce, Duncan Heyde, Daniel Webby - The Rock Network
- Jay-Jay's Kylie Jenner Togs - Jay-Jay Harvey, Mike Puru, Dominic Harvey, Kerry Gregory, Carl Thompson, Hamish Goodall - The Edge Network

=== Sir Paul Holmes Broadcaster of the Year ===
**Sir Paul Holmes Broadcaster of the Year**

**Paul Henry**

=== Outstanding Contribution to Radio ===
**Outstanding Contribution to Radio**

**Grant Lee**

**Robert Khan**

=== Services to Broadcasting ===
**Services to Broadcasting**

**John Markby**

**Bruce Appleton**

**Murray Inglis**

=== Special Recognition ===
**Special Recognition**

**Janine Bliss**
