= 2013 New Zealand Radio Awards =

- Awarded for: Excellence in radio broadcasting
- Country: New Zealand
- Presented by: Radio Broadcasters Association
- Website: radioawards.co.nz

The 2013 New Zealand Radio Awards were the awards for excellence in the New Zealand radio industry during 2012. It was the 36th New Zealand Radio Awards, and recognised staff, volunteers and contractors in both commercial and non-commercial broadcasting.

This is a list of nominees, with winners in bold.

== Winners and nominees ==
=== Best Stations ===
**Station of the year - Iwi**: **Radio Ngati Porou - Erana Keelan-Reedy - Radio Ngati Porou**; MFM - Jaqui Taituha - Te Reo Irirangi o Maniapoto	**Station of the year - Non-surveyed market**: **93.6 More FM, Taupo - Christian Shearer & Penny Lyons - MediaWorks Radio**; Radio 1XX - Glenn Smith - Radio Bay of Plenty
**Station of the year - Surveyed market**: **92.2 MORE FM, Manawatu - Willie Furnell - MediaWorks Radio**; Radio Dunedin - Cindy Davies - MediaWorks Radio; Newstalk ZB, Christchurch - Andrew Britt - The Radio Network	**Best Network**: **The Sound, Network - Vaughan Hobbs - Mediaworks Radio**; Newstalk ZB - Dallas Gurney - The Radio Network; The Edge, Network - Emily Hancox & Leon Wratt - MediaWorks Radio; The Rock, Network - Brad King - MediaWorks Radio

=== Best Music ===
**Best Music Breakfast Show - Metropolitan**: **Roger Farrelly, Leah Panapa, Bryce Casey, Andrew Mulligan - The Morning Rumble - The Rock, Network - MediaWorks Radio**; Jay-Jay Feeney, Mike Puru, Dom Harvey - The Edge Breakfast with Jay-Jay, Mike & Dom - The Edge, Network - MediaWorks Radio; Brian Kelly - Coast Breakfast - Coast, National - The Radio Network	**Best Music Breakfast Show - Regional**: **Patrina Roche & Callum Procter - Callum & P - Classic Hits, Dunedin - The Radio Network**; Mark Bunting & Justine Allen - Bunty and Jus in the Morning - Classic Hits, Waikato - The Radio Network; Martin Good & Sarah Van Der Kley - Martin & Sarah in the morning - Classic Hits, Hawkes Bay - The Radio Network
**Best Music Non-Breakfast Host or Hosts - Metropolitan**: **Carl Fletcher & Vaughan Smith - Drive with Fletch & Vaughan - The Edge, Network - MediaWorks Radio**; Dave Fitzgerald & Jason Gunn - Jase & Dave - Classic Hits, Network - The Radio Network; Jono Pryor & Robert Taylor - Robert and Jono Drive - The Rock, Network - MediaWorks Radio	**Best Music Non-Breakfast Host or Hosts - Regional**: **Neil Collins - Day-Time - Radio Dunedin - MediaWorks Radio**; Justin Evans - More FM Drive - 92.2 More FM, Manawatu - MediaWorks Radio; Katrina Smith - More FM Days - More FM, Nelson - MediaWorks Radio
**Best Music Host or Hosts - Provincial**: **Jordan Brannigan - Jordan Brannigan in the morning - Classic Hits, Wairarapa - The Radio Network**; Andrew Leiataua - The Andrew Leiataua Breakfast Show - 93.6 More FM, Taupo - MediaWorks Radio; Lance Dunne - Breakfast with Lance - Times FM, Orewa - MediaWorks Radio	**Best Music Feature**: **Tommy James - Music and the mob - Trevor Reekie - Radio New Zealand National - Radio New Zealand**; Musical Chairs - Rikki Morris - Nick Atkinson - Radio New Zealand National - Radio New Zealand; A Day In The Life of Chris O'Connor - Nick Atkinson - Radio New Zealand National - Radio New Zealand

=== Best Talk ===
**Best Talk or Current Affairs Host or Hosts- All Markets**: **Kim Hill - Saturday Morning with Kim Hill - Radio New Zealand National - Radio New Zealand**; Larry Williams - Larry Williams Drive - Newstalk ZB - The Radio Network; Mike Hosking - The Mike Hosking Breakfast - Newstalk ZB - The Radio Network	**Best Talk Back Host or Hosts - All Market**: **Leighton Smith - The Leighton Smith Show - Newstalk ZB - The Radio Network**; Michael Laws - The Michael Laws Show - Radio Live, Network - MediaWorks Radio; Willie Jackson & John Tamihere - Willie and JT - Radio Live, Network - MediaWorks Radio
**Best Sports Presenter/Commentator**: Tony Veitch - Radio Sport - The Radio Network; Nigel Yalden - Newstalk ZB & Radio Sport - The Radio Network; Murray Deaker - Newstalk ZB - The Radio Network	**Best Daily or Weekly Series - one hour +**: Saturday Morning with Kim Hill - Mark Cubey & Kim Hill - Radio New Zealand National - Radio New Zealand; Morning Report - Martin Gibson - Radio New Zealand National - Radio New Zealand; Nine to Noon - Kathryn Ryan - Radio New Zealand National - Radio New Zealand

=== Best News ===
**Best Newsreader**: **Hewitt Humphrey - Radio New Zealand National - Radio New Zealand**; Bernadine Oliver-Kerby - Newstalk ZB - The Radio Network; Catriona MacLeod - Radio New Zealand National - Radio New Zealand	**Best Team Coverage of a News Story**: **Newstalk ZB News - Hobsonville Tornado - Juliette Sivertsen, Anna Cross, Nina Burton, Sam Thompson, Adam Walker, Alexia Russell, Danny Watson, Andrew Topping, Larry Wiliams, Melita Tull, Mike Hosking, Emily Muller, Lawrence Hakiwai & Lesley Deverall - Newstalk ZB - The Radio Network**; Tornado - The RadioLIVE News Team; Melanie Jones, Paula Yeoman, David Burke-Kennedy, Duncan Garner & Rik Van Dijk - Radio Live, Network - MediaWorks Radio; Tongariro Eruption - Don Rood - Radio New Zealand National - Radio New Zealand
**Best New Journalist**: **Willy Nicholls - Radio Live, Network - MediaWorks Radio**; William Ray - Radio New Zealand National - Radio New Zealand; Adam Walker - Newstalk ZB - The Radio Network	**Individual Radio Journalist of the Year**: **Amanda Snow - Radio Live, Network - MediaWorks Radio**; Karen Brown - Radio New Zealand National - Radio New Zealand; Katy Gosset - Radio New Zealand National - Radio New Zealand
