= 2015 New Zealand Radio Awards =

- Awarded for: Excellence in radio broadcasting
- Country: New Zealand
- Presented by: Radio Broadcasters Association
- Website: radioawards.co.nz

The 2015 New Zealand Radio Awards were the awards for excellence in the New Zealand radio industry during 2014. It was the 38th New Zealand Radio Awards, recognising staff, volunteers and contractors in both commercial and non-commercial broadcasting.

== Winners and nominees ==
This is a list of nominees, with winners in bold.

=== Associated Craft Award ===
**Associated Craft Award**

**Claire Young - Group Marketing Executive - MediaWorks, National - MediaWorks Radio**

- MediaWorks Radio Finance Team - Jo Dwyer and the Finance Team - MediaWorks, Corporate - MediaWorks Radio
- Edward Swift - Online Editor - Newstalk ZB & Radio Sport - NZME
- Jono Manks - Broadcasting Tutor - NZ Radio Training School - Whitireia NZ Ltd

=== Best Children's Programme ===
**Best Children's Programme**

**Chad Awesomesauce - Suzy Cato, Trevor Plant, Peter Haynes, Hweiling Ow, Miller Yule - Stations Nationwide - Treehut Limited**

- The Great Big Kids' Show - Suzy Cato, Trevor Plant, Miller Yule - Stations Nationwide - Treehut Limited
- Crazy Kiwi Christmas Kids Show - Frank Ritchie, Catherine Sylvester, Levi Guyan, Daryl Habraken, Erin Carpenter, Phil Yule, Angus Mabey - Newstalk ZB, Network - Christian Broadcasting Association & NZME
- That's The Story - Ronnie Mackie, Zoe Nash, John Martin, Linda Tomokino, Cameron Nash, Carol Green, David Shirley, Misa McConnel, Megan Sellers, Josie Ryan, Mary Mackie - Coast, Network - Loudmouth Productions & NZME

=== Best Community Access Programmes ===
**Best Music Programme in Any Language** **World of Leopold Bloom Presents Welcome to Palestine & Baka Beyond - Leopold Bloom & Matt Budd - Fresh FM - Fresh FM, Nelson**: Jalsa Fiji Radio Bad Boys Party Time - Vinesh Prakash, Rajneeta Chand, Alvin Kumar, Jitesh Chetty, Akshay Reddy, Shahil Sharan - Plains FM 96.9 - Jalsa Fiji Radio	**Best Spoken/ Informational English Language Programme** **Hashtag Radio - Phid McAwesome, Charis McAwesome, Matt Bartley - Free FM & Hashtag ME - Free FM, Waikato**: Women's Voice - Silvana Erenchun, Raquel Martin - Free FM 89.0 - Free FM, Waikato; Wheels On Fire - Matthew Wills, Terry O'Hagan - Arrow FM - Access Radio Wairarapa (Charitable Trust)

=== Best Community Campaign ===
**Best Community Campaign**

**The Hits Toy Run - Matt Davy, Blair Dowling, Emma Langman - The Hits, Waikato - NZME**

- Breaking Bryce - Bryce Casey, Cameron Burns, Stacy Flahive, Brad King, Jason Mac, Michael Baker - The Rock, Network - MediaWorks
- Fill The Bus - Hayley Gillespie, Luci Williams, Dave Fitzgerald, AJ Funnell - The Hits, Christchurch - NZME

=== Best Content ===
**Best Content Director** **Leon Wratt - The Edge, Network - MediaWorks**: Dallas Gurney - Newstalk ZB, Network - NZME; Will Maisey - The Breeze, Wellington - MediaWorks	**Best Show Producer** **Emily Winstanley - The Mike Hosking Breakfast - Newstalk ZB, Network - NZME**: Glenn Hart - The Mike Hosking Breakfast - Newstalk ZB, Network - NZME; James Marbeck - ZM's Fletch, Vaughan and Megan - ZM, Network - NZME
**Best Video** **Wind Up Jono - Jono & Ben - Jono Pryor, Ben Boyce, Duncan Heyde, Dan Webby, Michael Baker, Ella Brockelsby - The Rock, Network - MediaWorks** **The Adventures of NZ's 13th Most Popular Morning Radio Show Part 2 - Matt Heath, Jeremy Wells, Josh Thomson, Laura McGoldrick, Nathan Hart, James Johnston, David Ridler, Mike McClung - Radio Hauraki, Network - NZME**: Jay-Jay, Mike and Dom in Space - Casey Sullivan, Carl Thompson, Oliver Green - The Edge, Network - MediaWorks	

=== Best Marketing Campaign ===
**Best Marketing Campaign**

**Join The Movement - Fletch, Vaughan and Megan - Jodie Marinkovich, Tracey Fox, John Galliers - ZM, Network - NZME**

**Mai FM - Charene Siakimotu, Nickson Clark, Nate Nauer, Kanoa Lloyd - Mai FM, Network - MediaWorks**

- The Hits Brand Launch - Anna Kemp, Tracey Fox, Polly Gillespie, Grant Kereama, Marc Peard - The Hits, Network - NZME

=== Best Music Feature ===
**Best Music Feature**

**Jimmy Page Special - Mark McCarron - The Sound, Network - MediaWorks**

- A & E Radio - Sheldon Murtha - Plains FM, Canterbury - Community Access Radio
- A Kiwi Abroad - Connor Nestor & Leroy Clampitt - Kiwi FM - MediaWorks

=== Best New Broadcaster ===
**Best New Broadcaster - Off-Air** **Lucy Carthew - Online Producer - ZM - ZM, Network - NZME**: Lucy Hills - National Promotions Manager - The Breeze, Network - MediaWorks; Emma Hunt - Brand Engagement Business Development Manager - Brand Engagement, Christchurch - NZME	**Best New Broadcaster - On-Air** **Luke Howden - Breakfast Host - Hokonui, Southland & South Otago - NZME**: Haley Crooks - Drive Announcer - Mai FM, Network - MediaWorks; Adam Cooper - Sports Journalist - Radio Sport & Newstalk ZB, Network - NZME

=== Best News ===
**Best Journalist - News or Sports** **Jessica Williams - RadioLIVE, Wellington - MediaWorks**: Lloyd Burr - RadioLIVE, Network - MediaWorks; Katarina Williams - RadioLIVE, Network - MediaWorks; Wilhelmina Shrimpton - RadioLIVE, Network - MediaWorks	**Best Newsreader** **Hilary Barry - RadioLIVE, Network - MediaWorks**: Bernadine Oliver-Kerby - Newstalk ZB, Network - NZME; Niva Retimanu - Newstalk ZB, Network - NZME
**Best Team Coverage of a News Story** **Terror Arrives in Sydney - RadioLIVE Team - RadioLIVE, Network - MediaWorks**: 2014 Election Aftermath - Dallas Gurney, Lesley Deverall, Barry Soper - Newstalk ZB, Network - NZME; Fiji Election Coverage 2014 - Robert Khan, Sanjesh Narain, Shalen Shandil, Mehak Vashist - Radio Tarana, Auckland - Radio Tarana (NZ) Ltd	

=== Best On Air ===
**Best Music Breakfast Show - Network** **Simon Barnett & Gary McCormick - Si & Gary - More FM, Network - MediaWorks**: Matt Heath, Jeremy Wells, Laura McGoldrick & Chris Goodwin - The Hauraki Breakfast with Matt, Jeremy & Laura - Radio Hauraki, Network - NZME; Nickson Clark, Nate Nauer & Kanoa Lloyd - The Mai Morning Crew - MaiFM, Network - MediaWorks; Roger Farrelly, Bryce Casey, Leah Panapa & Jeremy Pickford - The Morning Rumble - Rog, Bryce & Leah - The Rock, Network - MediaWorks	**Best Music Breakfast Show - Single Surveyed Market** **Callum Procter & Patrina Roche - Callum & P In The Morning - The Hits, Dunedin - NZME**: John Markby & Angela Gordon - The Markby & Flash Breakfast Show - 91.6 More FM, Northland - MediaWorks; Martin Good & Sarah van der Kley - Martin and Sarah for Breakfast - The Hits, Hawkes Bay - NZME
**Best Music Non-Breakfast Host or Team - Network** **Andrew Leiataua - The Andrew Leiataua Breakfast Show - More FM, Taupo - MediaWorks**: Lance Dunne - Breakfast with Lance - Times FM, Rodney - MediaWorks; Glenn Kirby & Natasha Knox - Glenn and Natasha on More FM Marlborough - More FM, Marlborough - MediaWorks	**Best Music Host or Team - Single Non-Surveyed Market** **Jono Pryor & Ben Boyce - Jono & Ben - The Rock Drive - The Rock, Network - MediaWorks**: Mikey Havoc - The Mikey Havoc Afternoon Express - Radio Hauraki, Network - NZME; Murray Lindsay - Coast Drive - Coast, Network - NZME
**Best Music Non-Breakfast Host or Team - Single Surveyed Market** **Lana Searle & Jason Gunn - Lana & Jase - More FM, Christchurch - MediaWorks**: Justin Evans - MORE FM Manawatu Drive - 92.2 MORE FM Manawatu - MediaWorks; Will Johnston - Will While You Work - The Hits, Bay of Plenty - NZME	**Best Talk Presenter/s - All Markets** **Mike Hosking - The Mike Hosking Breakfast - Newstalk ZB, Network - NZME**: Jack Tame - Saturday Morning with Jack Tame - Newstalk ZB, Network - NZME; Duncan Garner - Drive with Duncan Garner - RadioLIVE, Network - MediaWorks
**Best Talkback Presenter/s - All Markets** **Leighton Smith - The Leighton Smith Show - Newstalk ZB, Network - NZME**: Chris Lynch - Canterbury Mornings with Chris Lynch - Newstalk ZB, Christchurch - NZME; Sean Plunket - Talk with Sean Plunket - RadioLIVE, Network - MediaWorks	

=== Best Promotion ===
**Best Client Digital Execution** **The ACC for NZ Cricket - Mike Lane - iHeartRADIO, Network Digital - NZME**: Noel Leeming Massive Sellout - Darryl Paton, Melissa Walsh, Fraser Cameron, Aaran Casey, Dvir Gilboa, Jenni Haslam, Jenny Kong, Morgan Penn, James Roberts, Gerhard Simanke & Jason Reeves - Multi Station, Auckland - The Radio Bureau/NZME; Tappy D Moonshine Bootlegger - Sarah Catran & Amy Nola - ZM, Network Digital - NZME; 2degrees 4G The Drop - Kate Britten & Sarah Catran - ZM, Network Digital - NZME	**Best Multi Station Client Campaign** **KFC Colonel's Burger Builder - Nathan Hart, Amy Nola, Trent Hall, Michaela Pickworth - Flava & Radio Hauraki, Network - NZME**: iHeartRADIO presents Ed Sheeran, thanks to 2degrees - Carolyn Luey, Claudia Williams, Carolina Simpson, David Brice, Moe Lewin, Nathalie Otoole, Cameron Mansel, Wayne Sleeman, Shaun Gurden, Anthony Crawford, Bill Hays - The Hits, ZM & iHeartRADIO, Network - NZME; HELL Pizza Angry Dragon - NZME Brand Engagement - Hauraki, Flava, ZM & The Hits, Network - NZME
**Best Network Station Promotion** **Love You Man - Leon Wratt, Casey Sullivan & Dena Roberts - The Edge, Network - MediaWorks**: The Edge Cash Cannon - Casey Sullivan, Dena Roberts, Leon Wratt & Rachel Langford - The Edge, Network - MediaWorks; Breaking Bryce - Bryce Casey, Cameron Burns, Stacy Flahive, Brad King, Jason Mac, Michael Baker - The Rock, Network - MediaWorks	**Best Single Market Station Promotion** **The Breeze Music Video - Will Maisey - The Breeze, Wellington - MediaWorks**: Mystery Mailbox - Andy George - More FM, Rotorua - MediaWorks; #SpaceInvaders - Mike West & Sam West - More FM, Manawatu - MediaWorks
**Best Single Station Client Campaign** **Jono & Ben (V Vanilla Ice Bucket Challenge) - Cameron Burns, Bronwynn Bakker, Jono Pryor, Ben Boyce, Duncan Heyde, Fiona Hamilton & Brad King - The Rock, Network - MediaWorks**: ZM's Under the Dome - Kate Britten, Daniel Peek, Morgan Croasdale - ZM, Network - NZME; 2degrees 4G The Drop - Kate Britten & Sarah Catran - ZM, Network - NZME	**Best Station Digital Execution** **#JMD Break The Internet - Jay-Jay Harvey, Dominic Harvey, Mike Puru, Carl Thompson, Sophie Hallwright, Melanie Chico, Rachel Young - The Edge, Network - MediaWorks**: Project Ex - Dena Roberts & Casey Sullivan - The Edge, Network - MediaWorks NZ; Get Directions to One Direction - Rebecca Ryder, Katrina Jones, Frazer Cameron, Dvir Gilboa - ZM, Network Digital - NZME Radio

=== Best Radio Creative ===
**Best Commercial Voice Talent** **Ronnie Mackie - NZME, Network - NZME**: Chris Williams - NZME, Network - NZME; Leilani Fokelau - MediaWorks, Auckland - MediaWorks	**Best Creative Commercial/s - Single or Campaign** **Jack Links - Teenager, Hipster, Iron Maiden, Two Hands, Man Shelf - Chris Howden - Newstalk ZB, Network - NZME**: Rhymes About Rams - John Ansell & Tom Mackay - Newstalk ZB, Network - NZME; Found Footage - Alastair Barran - The Rock & The Edge, Auckland - MediaWorks
**Best Effective Commercial/s - Single or Campaign** **Jack Links - Teenager, Hipster, Adlets - Chris Howden - Newstalk ZB, Network - NZME**: Conroy Removal - Journey, Shark, Normal - Chris Howden - Newstalk ZB & The Hits, Network - NZME; Found Footage - Alastair Barran - The Rock & The Edge, Auckland - MediaWorks	**Best Jingle or Jingle Package** **Winton Motorcycles - Kelvin Crickett & Gareth Curtis - All Stations, Invercargill - NZME**: The Gintrap - Kelvin Crickett & Gareth Curtis - All Stations, Napier - NZME; Dapper Dogs - Gareth Curtis & Rew Shearer - All Stations, Auckland - NZME

=== Best Radio Website ===
**Best Radio Website**

**www.therock.net.nz - Gorjan Ivanovski, Chanel Prime, Michael Baker, Ella Brockelsby - The Rock, Network - MediaWorks**

- www.theedge.co.nz - Chanel Prime, Rachael Young, Michael Kooge, Oliver Green, Melanie Chico - The Edge, Network - MediaWorks
- www.maifm.co.nz - Chanel Prime, Rachael Young, Amber Howard - Mai FM, Network - MediaWorks

=== Best Spoken Programmes ===
**Best Daily or Weekly Series** **The Nutters Club with Mike King - Mike King & Boris Sokratov - Newstalk ZB, Network - The Key to Life Charitable Trust & NZME**: KPMG Early Edition with Rachel Smalley - Rachel Smalley & Laura Heathcote - Newstalk ZB, Network - NZME; Sunday @ 5 - Mehak Vashist, Shalen Shandil & Sanjesh Narain - Radio Tarana, Auckland - Radio Tarana (NZ) Ltd	**Best Documentary** **Christmas Truce - Leighton Smith, Rob Harley, Josh Couch, Phil Yule - Newstalk ZB, Network - Christian Broadcasting Association & NZME**: Human Trafficking - Petra Bagust, Phil Guyan, Josh Couch, Phil Yule, Erin Carpenter - Newstalk ZB, Network - Christian Broadcasting Association & NZME; Newstalk BC - Pat Brittenden, Josh Couch, Phil Guyan, Josh Couch, Phil Yule, Erin Carpenter - Newstalk ZB, Network - Christian Broadcasting Association & NZME

=== Best Sport ===
**Best Sports Presenter/Commentator** **Tony Veitch - Newstalk ZB & Radio Sport, Network - NZME**: Martin Devlin - Radio Sport, Network - NZME; The Alternative Commentary Collective (ACC) - Mike Lane, Jeremy Wells, Leigh Hart, Jason Hoyte, Matt Heath, Paul Ford, Lee Baker, Scott Aitchison - iHeartRADIO, Network - NZME	**Best Sports Story/Event** **Speight's Coast to Coast Longest Day - Brian Ashby, Lesley Murdoch, James Sheehan, Gavin Searle, Adam Cooper, Russell Cryer, Tim Dyer - Newstalk ZB, Christchurch - NZME**: Matthew Elliott Sacking - Radio Sport Team - Radio Sport, Network - NZME; All Blacks End of Year Tour - Nigel Yalden - Newstalk ZB & Radio Sport, Network - NZME

=== Best Technical Production ===
**Best Promotional Trailer** **The Edge TV - Oompa Loompa - Richard Culph & Grant Brodie - The Edge, Auckland - MediaWorks**: Newstalk BC - Phil Guyan, Nik Brown, Phil Yule, Josh Couch - Newstalk ZB, Network - Christian Broadcasting Association & NZME; ZM & Durex Longest Night - Kieran Bell - ZM, Network - NZME	**Commercial Production** **Spookers - Found Footage - Chris Hurring - The Rock &The Edge, Auckland - MediaWorks** **Spookers - Sick Santa - Chris Hurring - The Rock &The Edge, Auckland - MediaWorks**: Waitaki District Council - Alan Larsen - The Hits & Newstalk ZB, Oamaru - NZME
**Station Imaging** **Grant Brodie - The Edge, Network - MediaWorks**: Kieran Bell - ZM, Network - NZME; Josh Wood - More FM, Network - MediaWorks	

=== Sales Team of the Year ===
**Metropolitan Sales Team of the Year** **MediaWorks Canterbury - Canterbury Sales Team - MediaWorks, Canterbury - MediaWorks**: NZME Auckland - Auckland Sales Team - NZME, Auckland - NZME; MediaWorks Network - Auckland Network Sales Team - MediaWorks, Network - MediaWorks	**Regional or Provincial Sales Team of the Year** **MediaWorks Tauranga - Tauranga Sales Team - MediaWorks, Tauranga - MediaWorks**: MediaWorks Taranaki - Taranaki Sales Team - MediaWorks, Taranaki - MediaWorks; NZME Tauranga - Tauranga Sales Team - NZME, Tauranga - NZME

=== Station of the Year ===
**Station of the Year - Network** **The Edge - Leon Wratt - The Edge, Network - MediaWorks**: The Rock - Brad King, Stacy Flahive & Jason Mac - The Rock, Network - MediaWorks; Newstalk ZB - Dallas Gurney - Newstalk, Network - NZME	**Station of the Year - Non-Surveyed Market** **More FM, Taupo - Penny Lyons & Bryn Ingham - More FM, Taupo - MediaWorks**: 1XX - Glenn Smith - 1XX, Whakatane - Radio Bay of Plenty Ltd; Times FM - Anna McGovern & Lia Shelford - Time FM, Rodney - MediaWorks
**Station of the Year - Surveyed Market** **92.2 MORE FM Manawatu - Willie Furnell - More FM, Manawatu - MediaWorks**: The Breeze, Wellington - Tim Lockhart, Will Maisey, Fred Thaisen - The Breeze, Wellington - MediaWorks; 91.6 More FM, Northland - Erena Miller - More FM, Northland - MediaWorks	**Iwi Station of the Year**

=== 'The Blackie' (Award) ===
'**The Blackie' (Award)**

**The Rock & The Edge Station Swap - The Morning Rumble & Jay-Jay, Mike and Dom - The Rock & The Edge, Network - MediaWorks**

- The Best Joke In The World - Jay-Jay Harvey, Dominic Harvey, Mike Puru, Sophie Hallwright, Carl Thompson - The Edge, Network - MediaWorks
- Jono & Ben - Wind Up Your Wife - Jono Pryor, Ben Boyce, Duncan Heyde, Dan Webby - The Rock, Network - MediaWorks

=== Sir Paul Holmes Broadcaster of the Year ===
**Sir Paul Holmes Broadcaster of the Year**

**Mike Hosking - Newstalk ZB, Network - NZME**

=== Outstanding Contribution to Radio ===
**Outstanding Contribution to Radio**

**Leighton Smith**

**Sussan Turner**

**Gill Stewart**

=== Services to Broadcasting ===
**Services to Broadcasting**

**Tom Davidson**

**Phil Yule**

**Bill Hays**
