= Radio Broadcasters Association =

New Zealand radio industry body

- Formation: 1971
- Website: http://www.rba.co.nz/

The Radio Broadcasters Association is a New Zealand commercial radio industry body established in 1971 with many partners and stakeholders within government, business, the music industry and local communities.

The Radio Broadcasters Association is governed by a constitution with an executive board and represents 16 member networks and stations. The current chief executive is Jana Rangooni.

== Members ==
Full members of the Radio Broadcasters Association are NZME, MediaWorks, Chinese Voice, Rhema Media, Radio Tarana, Radio Bay of Plenty, Beach FM, Radio Wanaka, Central FM, Southland Community Broadcasters and Peak FM.

Associate members of the Radio Broadcasters Association are the Pacific Media Network, Humm FM, Radio New Zealand, Te Whakaruruhau o Ngā Reo Irirangi and Radio Samoa.

Radio Computing Services is an affiliate member.
