= Leighton Smith (radio host) =

New Zealand broadcaster

Leighton Smith MNZM
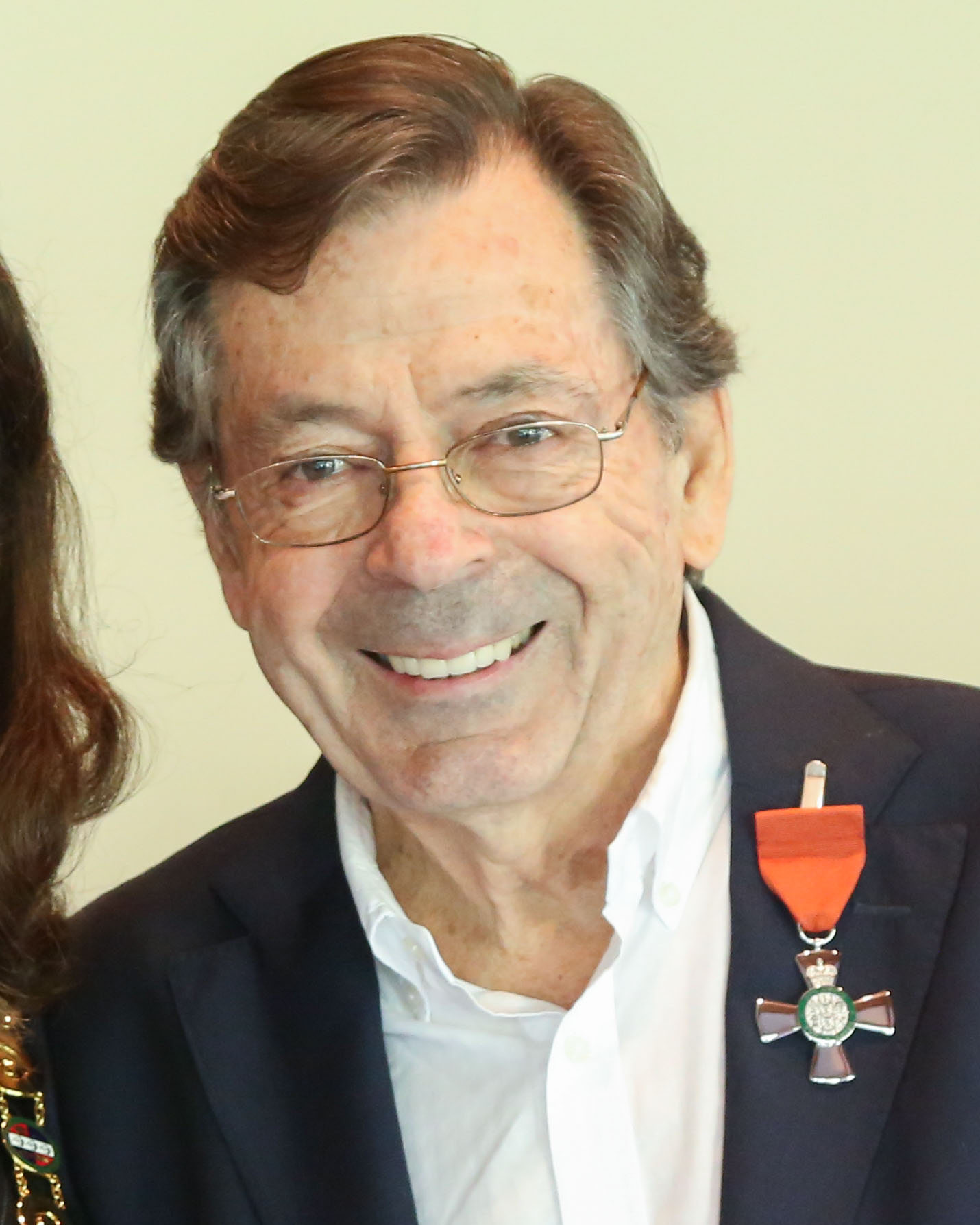
- Smith in 2026
- Born: Leighton Irwin Smith; 13 December 1946 (age 79); Australia
- Occupation: Radio host
- Years active: 1980-2018

Leighton Irwin Smith MNZM (born 13 December 1946) is an Australian-born award-winning former talkback radio host based in Auckland, New Zealand. Until December 2018, he presented the 8:30 am to midday slot from Monday to Friday on commercial talk radio network Newstalk ZB.

Smith started his broadcasting career on Sydney's 2CH as a "junior disco jockey". He moved to New Zealand for a one-year stint with 2ZB in Wellington in 1980, but stayed for five years. After a brief stint on a radio in Adelaide, Smith returned to Auckland in 1985, presenting on 1ZB, soon renamed Newstalk ZB. He remained in the 8:30am to midday timeslot until his retirement in 2018.

Smith won Best Talk Back Host or Hosts - All Markets at the 2013 New Zealand Radio Awards. In October 2018 he was presented with a Scroll of Honour from the Variety Artists Club of New Zealand for his contribution to New Zealand entertainment.

In a 2007 interview with libertarian magazine the Free Radical, he described himself as somewhat libertarian. He released his book Beyond the Microphone at the end of 2013.

Smith has expressed disbelief in anthropogenic climate change. He has no scientific qualifications.

He used to own the Clevedon Hills vineyard, near Auckland.

Smith recently published his 300th The Leighton Smith Podcast.

In the 2026 New Year Honours, Smith was appointed a Member of the New Zealand Order of Merit, for services to broadcasting.
