= Alison Ballance =

New Zealand writer, journalist, radio presenter and producer

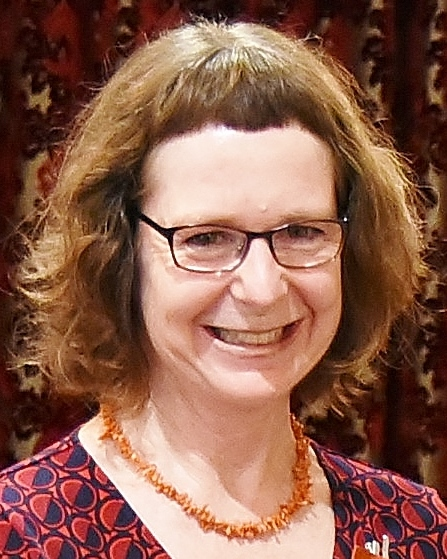
- Ballance in 2017
- Born: 1961
- Awards: Member of the New Zealand Order of Merit

Academic background
- Education: Glendowie College, University of Auckland, Massey University
- Thesis: Aspects of the biology of Campbell Island feral sheep (Ovis aries L.) (1986)

Alison Patricia Ballance MNZM is a New Zealand zoologist, author, film-maker and radio producer. Ballance has written more than thirty books, filmed wildlife documentaries, and produced and presented radio and podcasts on a wide range of subjects relating to science and the natural world. In 2017, Ballance was appointed a Member of the New Zealand Order of Merit for services to natural history, filmmaking and broadcasting.

== Career ==
Ballance graduated from the University of Auckland in 1980, where she earned her Bachelor of Science in 1982. Ballance completed a Master of Science at Massey University in 1986. Her thesis was titled Aspects of the biology of Campbell Island feral sheep (Ovis aries L.).

Ballance has written more than 30 non-fiction books and children's books on topics such as kākāpō, takahē, rare wildlife, mountains and nature, and a biography of conservationist Don Merton. She was a finalist at both the New Zealand Post’s Book Awards and the Montana New Zealand Book Awards, and won a Storylines Notable Book Award.

Ballance worked as a film-maker for many years and made more than 16 documentaries for the Discovery Channel and the National Geographic Channel about animals as diverse as tigers, Przewalski's horse, the wētā, spectacled bears and marine iguanas in countries such as Mongolia, Russia, India and Ecuador. She swam with 17 species of shark and wrote a book about the great white shark.

From October 1990 to October 2008 Ballance was producer of natural history documentaries for Natural History New Zealand in Dunedin. She then produced and hosted Our Changing World, the weekly science and environmental radio programme of Radio New Zealand. She retired from Radio New Zealand in 2021. Ballance produced a number of podcasts, including Voice of the Iceberg, Voices from Antarctica, The Science Of... podcast series, the Kākāpō Files and Voice of the Kākāpō podcast series, and the International Year of the Periodic Table chemistry podcast Elemental.

In 2013 Ballance was part of an expedition to Three Kings Islands with a team from NIWA, Te Papa museum, and the University of Queensland. Ballance reported on the expedition for Our Changing World, and also wrote the expedition blog. She had earlier been a diver and science communicator on the 2011 Kermadec Biodiscovery expedition.

== Honours and awards ==
In the 2017 New Year Honours, Ballance was appointed a Member of the New Zealand Order of Merit for services to natural history, filmmaking and broadcasting. Other awards Ballance has won include:

- Nonfiction Shortlist for Hoki at the New Zealand Post Children’s Book Awards 1998
- Royal Society of New Zealand Science Book Prize 2011 for Kakapo: Rescued from the brink of extinction
- Certificate of Commendation for Science Communication at the Whitley Awards of the Royal Zoological Society of New South Wales, 2017 for the book New Zealand’s Great White Shark: How Science is Revealing Their Secrets
- Storylines Notable Book 2018 for New Zealand’s Great White Shark: How Science is Revealing Their Secrets

== Selected works ==
- Ballance, Alison (December 2006). Don Merton: The Man Who Saved the Black Robin. Reed Books.
- Ballance, Alison (December 2009). Kakapo: Rescued from the brink of extinction. Craig Potton Publishing. ISBN 978-1-877517-27-3.
- Ballance, Alison (February 2017). New Zealand's great white sharks: how science is revealing their secrets. Potton and Burton. ISBN 978-0-947503-18-5.
- Ballance, Alison (May 2023). Takahē: Bird of Dreams. Potton and Burton. ISBN 978-1-98-855047-3.
