= Shunsuke Sakuya =

Japanese actor and voice actor

- 咲野 俊介
- Born: Shunsuke Ito (伊藤 俊介); 20 May 1965 (age 61); Miyazaki, Japan
- Other name: Shusuke Sakino
- Occupations: Actor, voice actor
- Years active: 1989–present
- Agent: Office Osawa

Shunsuke Sakuya (咲野 俊介, Sakuya Shunsuke; born 20 May 1965), occasionally miscredited as Shusuke Sakino, is a Japanese actor and voice actor.

== Filmography ==
=== Television animation ===
1990s

- Virtua Fighter (1996) (A Watchman)
- Detective Conan (1997) (Mokunen)

2000s

- Zoids: New Century (2001) (Captain Stigma Stoeller)
- Heat Guy J (2002) (Gene Glen)
- Lupin the 3rd - Episode 0: The First Contact (2002) (Shade)
- Tank Knights Fortress (2003) (White Tiger)
- Astro Boy (2003) (Bird)
- Major (2004) (Hideki Shigeno)
- Zoids Fuzors (2004) (Keith)
- Rockman.EXE Axess (2004) (Windman)
- Naruto (2004) (Sakon, Ukon)
- Samurai Champloo (2004) (Mori)
- Trinity Blood (2005) (Count Alfred Meinz)
- Ginga Legend Weed (2005) (Blue)
- A Spirit of the Sun (2006) (Kurofuji)
- Bleach (2006) (Ryo Utagawa)
- Kekkaishi (2006) (Sanan)
- Lupin III: Seven Days Rhapsody (2006) (Fire)
- Noein (2006) (Makoto Shinohara)
- Ghost Hound (2007) (Tatsumi Toyooka, Tsuneji Izawa)
- Darker than Black (2007) (Kirk Lindsay)
- Nabari no Ou (2008) (Somei Shimizu)
- Viper's Creed (2009) (Zaliche)

2010s

- Blade (2011) (Stan Davis)
- Jewelpet Sunshine (2011) (Munata)
- One Piece (2013) (Scotch)
- Ping Pong (2014) (Ryuichi "Dragon" Kazama)
- Terror in Resonance (2014) (Kenjirō Shibazaki)
- Tokyo Ghoul √A (2015) (Yoshitoki Washū)
- Magic Kaito 1412 (2015) (Dan Mitsuishi)
- Lupin the 3rd (2015) (Nix)
- Subete ga F ni Naru (2015) (Seiji Shindō)
- 91 Days (2016) (Corvo)
- One Piece (2018) (Charlotte Daifuku)
- O Maidens in Your Savage Season (2019) (Hisashi Saegusa)

2020s

- Pet (2020) (Katsuragi)
- Joran: The Princess of Snow and Blood (2021) (Janome)
- Heavenly Delusion (2023) (Juuichi)
- Fate/strange Fake: -Whispers of Dawn- (2023) (Langal)
- Frieren: Beyond Journey's End (2023) (Graf Granat)
- Meiji Gekken: 1874 (2024) (Ōkubo Toshimichi)
- The Most Notorious "Talker" Runs the World's Greatest Clan (2024) (Brandon Stollen)
- Fate/strange Fake (2024) (Langal)
- One Piece (2025-) (Gol D. Roger)
- Nippon Sangoku (2026) (Aterui Kura)

=== Original video animation (OVA) ===
- Demon Prince Enma (2006) (Yoshinaga)

=== Theatrical animation ===
- Legend of the Millennium Dragon (2011) (Kishin)
- The Tibetan Dog (2012) (Sumudu)
- Ghost in the Shell: Arise - Border:3 Ghost Tears (2014) (Ishikawa)
- Psycho-Pass: The Movie (2015) (Tadao Miyazaki)
- Ghost in the Shell: The New Movie (2015) (Ishikawa)

=== Web animation ===
- Mobile Suit Gundam Thunderbolt (2015) (Graham)
- Blade of the Immortal -Immortal- (2019) (Eiku Shizuma)

=== Video games ===
- Final Fantasy X (2001) (Rin)
- Final Fantasy X-2 (2003) (Rin, Bechlam)
- Yakuza (2005) (Osamu Kashiwagi)
- Yakuza 2 (2006) (Osamu Kashiwagi)
- Yakuza 3 (2009) (Osamu Kashiwagi)
- Alan Wake (2010) (Japanese dub) (Alan Wake)
- Rhythm Thief & the Emperor's Treasure (2012) (Borwen)
- Phoenix Wright: Ace Attorney - Dual Destinies (2013) (Jin Yuugami/Simon Blackquill)
- Ryū ga Gotoku Ishin! (2014) (Inoue Genzaburō)
- Yakuza 0 (2015) (Osamu Kashiwagi)
- Yakuza Kiwami (2016) (Osamu Kashiwagi)
- Pokémon Go (2016) (Slugma and Magcargo)
- Phoenix Wright: Ace Attorney − Spirit of Justice (2016) (Jin Yuugami/Simon Blackquill)
- For Honor (2017) (Kensei)
- Crash Bandicoot N. Sane Trilogy (2017) (Doctor N. Gin)
- Yakuza Kiwami 2 (2017) (Osamu Kashiwagi)
- Xenoblade Chronicles 2 (2017) (Gort)
- Xenoblade Chronicles 2: Torna – The Golden Country (2018) (Gort)
- Fist of the North Star: Lost Paradise (2018) (Toki)
- Devil May Cry 5 (2019) (Urizen)
- Kingdom Hearts III (2019) (Hamm)
- Overwatch (2019) (Baptiste)
- Crash Bandicoot 4: It's About Time (2020) (Doctor N. Gin)
- Yakuza: Like a Dragon (2020) (Osamu Kashiwagi ("The Bartender"))
- Ghostwire: Tokyo (2022) (Hannya)
- Anonymous;Code (2022) (Tengen Ozutani)
- Spider-Man 2 (2023) (Cletus Kasady)

=== Tokusatsu ===
- Juukou B-Fighter (1995) - Black Beet (episodes 19-29, 31-33, 35-38 & 40-43) (Shadow Played by Seiji Takaiwa & Keisuke Tsuchiya)

=== Dubbing ===
==== Voice-double ====
- Ethan Hawke
  - Assault on Precinct 13 (Sgt. Jake Roenick)
  - Lord of War (Agent Jack Valentine)
  - Cymbeline (Iachimo)
  - Born to Be Blue (Chet Baker)
  - Regression (Detective Bruce Kenner)
  - In a Valley of Violence (Paul)
  - 24 Hours to Live (Travis Conrad)
  - Valerian and the City of a Thousand Planets (Jolly the Pimp)
  - Stockholm (Kaj Hansson / Lars Nystrom)
  - The Kid (Sheriff Pat Garrett)
  - The Guilty (Sergeant Bill Miller)
  - The Black Phone (Albert Shaw / The Grabber)
  - Raymond & Ray (Ray)
  - Glass Onion: A Knives Out Mystery (Efficient Man)
  - The Northman (King Aurvandill War-Raven)
  - Leave the World Behind (Clay Sandford)
  - Black Phone 2 (Albert Shaw / The Grabber)
- Patrick Wilson
  - Watchmen (Daniel Dreiberg/Nite Owl II)
  - Morning Glory (Adam Bennett)
  - Insidious (Josh Lambert)
  - Young Adult (Buddy Slade)
  - Prometheus (Shaw's father)
  - The Conjuring (Ed Warren)
  - Insidious: Chapter 2 (Josh Lambert)
  - Stretch (Stretch)
  - Home Sweet Hell (Don Champagne)
  - The Conjuring 2 (Ed Warren)
  - Annabelle Comes Home (Ed Warren)
  - Midway (Edwin T. Layton)
  - In the Tall Grass (Ross Humboldt)
  - The Conjuring: The Devil Made Me Do It (Ed Warren)
  - Moonfall (Brian Harper)
  - Insidious: The Red Door (Josh Lambert)
- Mark Wahlberg
  - The Departed (Staff Sgt. Sean Dignam)
  - The Lovely Bones (Jack Salmon)
  - Contraband (Chris Farraday)
  - Ted (John Bennett)
  - Broken City (Billy Taggart)
  - Lone Survivor (Marcus Luttrell)
  - Ted 2 (John Bennett)
  - Patriots Day (Tommy Saunders)
  - Mile 22 (James Silva)
- Ben Affleck
  - Changing Lanes (Gavin Banek)
  - Gigli (Larry Gigli)
  - Paycheck (Michael Jennings)
  - Daredevil (Matt Murdock/Daredevil)
  - Surviving Christmas (Drew Latham)
  - He's Just Not That Into You (Neil Jones)
  - State of Play (Stephen Collins)
  - Runner Runner (Ivan Block)
  - Air (Phil Knight)

==== Film ====
- 10,000 BC (Ka'Ren (Mo Zinal))
- 10.0 Earthquake (Jack (Henry Ian Cusick))
- 1987: When the Day Comes (Kim Jeong-nam (Sul Kyung-gu))
- 27 Dresses (George (Edward Burns))
- 300 (King Xerxes (Rodrigo Santoro))
- 300: Rise of an Empire (King Xerxes (Rodrigo Santoro))
- 40 Days and 40 Nights (Chris (Glenn Fitzgerald))
- .45 (Reilly (Stephen Dorff))
- Alice in Wonderland (Lowell (John Hopkins))
- Aliens (Private Drake (Mark Rolston))
- Aliens vs. Predator: Requiem (Dallas Howard (Steven Pasquale))
- Angels & Demons (Mr. Gray/The Assassin (Nikolaj Lie Kaas))
- Armored (Mike Cochrane (Matt Dillon))
- Arthur and the Invisibles (Francis (Doug Rand))
- Arthur and the Revenge of Maltazard (Armand (Robert Stanton))
- The Assassination of Jesse James by the Coward Robert Ford (Jesse James (Brad Pitt))
- Bad Company (Jake Hayes/Kevin Pope/Michael Turner (Chris Rock))
- Bad Education (Enrique Goded (Fele Martínez))
- Battle: Los Angeles (USMC Cpl. Jason "Cocheez" Lockett (Cory Hardrict))
- Before Night Falls (Lazaro Gomez Carriles (Olivier Martinez))
- Behind Enemy Lines (Captain Rodway, USMC (Charles Malik Whitfield))
- Below (Steven Coors (Scott Foley))
- Blackhat (Chen Dawai (Wang Leehom))
- Bohemian Rhapsody (Ray Foster (Mike Myers))
- Breakin' All the Rules (Evan Fields (Morris Chestnut))
- The Call (Officer Paul Phillips (Morris Chestnut))
- The Cat's Meow (Thomas H. Ince (Cary Elwes))
- Chaos (Jason York, a.k.a. Lorenz/Scott Curtis (Wesley Snipes))
- Charlie's Angels (2003 TV Asahi edition) (Jason Gibbons (Matt LeBlanc))
- Charlie's Angels: Full Throttle (Jason Gibbons (Matt LeBlanc))
- Charlie and the Chocolate Factory (Mr. Bucket (Noah Taylor))
- The Chronicles of Narnia: Prince Caspian (General Glozelle (Pierfrancesco Favino))
- Cloverfield (Hudson "Hud" Platt (T.J. Miller))
- Coco Before Chanel (Arthur Capel (Alessandro Nivola))
- Collateral Damage (Claudio "Wolf" Perrini (Cliff Curtis))
- Crash (Anthony (Chris "Ludacris" Bridges))
- The Darwin Awards (Harvey (David Arquette))
- Dawn of the Planet of the Apes (Carver (Kirk Acevedo))
- Dead Man Down (Alphonse Hoyt (Terrence Howard))
- Deadly Impact (Tom Armstrong (Sean Patrick Flanery))
- The Devil's Backbone (Jacinto (Eduardo Noriega))
- Did You Hear About the Morgans? (U.S. Marshal Lasky (Seth Gilliam))
- Dirty (Officer Armando Sancho (Clifton Collins Jr.))
- Doctor Zhivago (Pasha Antipov (Tom Courtenay))
- Dreamgirls (Curtis Taylor, Jr. (Jamie Foxx))
- Eastern Promises (Kirill (Vincent Cassel))
- The Edge of Seventeen (Mr. Bruner (Woody Harrelson))
- Elegy (Kenneth Kepesh (Peter Sarsgaard))
- Enemy of the State (Jones (Scott Caan))
- Fading Gigolo (Fioravante (John Turturro))
- The Family Stone (Everett Stone (Dermot Mulroney))
- Fast & Furious (Fenix "Rise" Calderon (Laz Alonso))
- The Fifth Estate (Julian Assange (Benedict Cumberbatch))
- The Forgotten (Mr. Shineer (Linus Roache))
- The French Dispatch (Moses Rosenthaler (Benicio del Toro))
- Game Change (Todd Palin (David Barry Gray))
- Gangster No. 1 (Young Gangster (Paul Bettany))
- Ghost Ship (Jack Ferriman (Desmond Harrington))
- G.I. Joe: Retaliation (Firefly (Ray Stevenson))
- The Girl Next Door (Kelly (Timothy Olyphant))
- Gran Torino (Duke (Cory Hardrict))
- The Great Gatsby (George Wilson (Scott Wilson))
- The Grudge (Doug McCarthy (Jason Behr))
- Half Past Dead (Donald Robert Johnson (Morris Chestnut))
- Hart's War (Major Joe Clary (Rick Ravanello))
- Hannibal Rising (Kolnas (Kevin McKidd))
- Henry Fool (Steve (Paul Boocock))
- High Noon (2021 Star Channel edition) (Deputy Marshal Harvey Pell (Lloyd Bridges))
- Homefront (Morgan "Gator" Bodine (James Franco))
- Homeland (David Estes (David Harewood))
- House of Wax (Wade (Jared Padalecki))
- I Am Number Four (Mogadorian Commander (Kevin Durand))
- I.D. (Bob (Warren Clarke))
- Inception (Eames (Tom Hardy))
- In the Bedroom (Richard Strout (William Mapother))
- Into the Storm (Peter "Pete" Moore (Matt Walsh))
- The Interpreter (Phillipe (Yvan Attal))
- Jack the Giant Slayer (Crawe (Eddie Marsan))
- Jane Got a Gun (Dan Frost (Joel Edgerton))
- Jay and Silent Bob Strike Back (Jay (Jason Mewes))
- John Carter (Sab Than (Dominic West))
- K-19: The Widowmaker (Petty Officer Pavel Loktev (Christian Camargo))
- King Arthur: Legend of the Sword (Sir William "Goosefat Bill" Wilson (Aidan Gillen))
- Kingmaker (Kim Woon-beom (Sol Kyung-gu))
- Knight and Day (Antonio Quintana (Jordi Mollà))
- Knights of the Zodiac (Mylock (Mark Dacascos))
- Ladder 49 (Dennis Gauquin (Billy Burke))
- The Lake House (Morgan Price (Dylan Walsh))
- Land of the Dead (Riley Denbo (Simon Baker))
- The Last Castle (Yates (Mark Ruffalo))
- The Last Stand (Frank Martinez (Rodrigo Santoro))
- Line Walker 2: Invisible Spy (CIB Chief Inspector Ching (Nick Cheung))
- The Long Way Home (Jang Nam-bok (Sol Kyung-gu))
- The Lookout (Gary Spargo (Matthew Goode))
- The Man (Joey Trent / Kane (Luke Goss))
- Man on Fire (Samuel Ramos (Marc Anthony))
- May (Adam Stubbs (Jeremy Sisto))
- Me and You and Everyone We Know (Richard Swersey (John Hawkes))
- The Merciless (Jae-ho (Sol Kyung-gu))
- The Milagro Beanfield War (Joe Mondragon (Chick Vennera))
- Milk (Dan White (Josh Brolin))
- Mission: Impossible 2 (2006 TV Asahi edition) (Ulrich (Dominic Purcell))
- Mother of Tears (Detective Enzo Marchi (Cristian Solimeno))
- The Monuments Men (Lt. James Granger (Matt Damon))
- Mulan (Bori Khan (Jason Scott Lee))
- My Big Fat Greek Wedding (Ian Miller (John Corbett))
- My Life in Ruins (Poupi Kakas (Alexis Georgoulis))
- Mystic River (Sean Devine (Kevin Bacon))
- New Year's Eve (Jensen (Jon Bon Jovi))
- Noel (Michael Riley (Paul Walker))
- Once Upon a Time in America (Maximilian "Max" Bercovicz/Christopher Bailey (James Woods))
- Once Upon a Time in Mexico (General Marquez (Gerardo Vigil))
- One Hour Photo (Will Yorkin (Michael Vartan))
- Only the Brave (Eric Marsh (Josh Brolin))
- Operation Red Sea (Yang Rui (Zhang Yi))
- Oppenheimer (Haakon Chevalier (Jefferson Hall))
- Out of Time (Chris Harrison (Dean Cain))
- Panic Room (Officer Keeney (Paul Schulze))
- The Paperboy (Ward Jansen (Matthew McConaughey))
- The Paradine Case (Anthony Keane (Gregory Peck))
- A Perfect Getaway (Nick (Timothy Olyphant))
- Platoon (2003 TV Tokyo edition) (Junior (Reggie Johnson))
- Poseidon (Dylan Johns (Josh Lucas))
- Priest (Salesman (Brad Dourif))
- The Prince (Paul (Jason Patric))
- Push (Pinky Stein (Nate Mooney))
- Quarantine 2: Terminal (Henry (Josh Cooke))
- The Queen (Tony Blair (Michael Sheen))
- Race (Larry Snyder (Jason Sudeikis))
- The Raven (Ivan Reynolds (Sam Hazeldine))
- Red Riding Hood (Cesaire (Billy Burke))
- Resident Evil (Chad Kaplan (Martin Crewes))
- Robin Hood: Prince of Thieves (Guy of Gisbourne (Michael Wincott))
- Rush (Alastair Caldwell (Stephen Mangan))
- The Sapphires (Dave Lovelace (Chris O'Dowd))
- Say It Isn't So (Gilbert Noble (Chris Klein))
- Secondhand Lions (Walter Caldwell (adult) (Josh Lucas))
- Secretary (Peter (Jeremy Davies))
- Seven Psychopaths (Billy Bickle (Sam Rockwell))
- Shadowboxer (Clayton Mayfield (Stephen Dorff))
- The Shape of Water (Richard Strickland (Michael Shannon))
- Shark Night (Dennis (Chris Carmack))
- Sherlock Holmes (Lord Coward (Hans Matheson))
- Silent Hill: Revelation (Detective Santini (Jefferson Brown))
- Six Bullets (Andrew Fayden (Joe Flanigan))
- Sky Captain and the World of Tomorrow (Joseph "Joe" Sullivan/Sky Captain (Jude Law))
- The Smurfs (Patrick "Pat" Winslow (Neil Patrick Harris))
- The Smurfs 2 (Patrick "Pat" Winslow (Neil Patrick Harris))
- Snatch (2017 Blu-Ray edition) (Franky Four-Fingers (Benicio del Toro))
- Snow White and the Huntsman (Finn (Sam Spruell))
- Sonic the Hedgehog 2 (Randall Handel (Shemar Moore))
- Space Cowboys (Ethan Glance (Loren Dean))
- Spellbound (Dr. Anthony Edwardes/John Ballantyne (Gregory Peck))
- Starship Troopers 2: Hero of the Federation (Lieutenant Pavlov Dill (Lawrence Monoson))
- Stir of Echoes (Tom Witzky (Kevin Bacon))
- Summer Catch (Ryan Dunne (Freddie Prinze Jr.))
- S.W.A.T. (Alexander "Alex" Montel (Olivier Martinez))
- Sweet Sixteen (Stan (Gary McCormack))
- Teenage Mutant Ninja Turtles (Vern Fenwick (Will Arnett))
- Teenage Mutant Ninja Turtles: Out of the Shadows (Vern Fenwick (Will Arnett))
- Tenacious D in The Pick of Destiny (Satan (Dave Grohl))
- Terminator 2: Judgment Day (T-1000 (Robert Patrick))
- The Texas Chainsaw Massacre (Kemper (Eric Balfour))
- Thor (Volstagg (Ray Stevenson))
- Thor: The Dark World (Volstagg (Ray Stevenson))
- The Three Burials of Melquiades Estrada (Ptmn. Mike Norton (Barry Pepper))
- Thunderball (Felix Leiter (Rik Van Nutter))
- Thunderbird 6 (Captain Foster (impostor) (John Carson))
- Tigerland (Pvt. Johnson (Russell Richardson))
- Tomorrowland (Eddie Newton (Tim McGraw))
- Transformers: Dark of the Moon (Roadbuster (Ron Bottitta))
- Trapped (Joe Hickey (Kevin Bacon))
- Tremors 3: Back to Perfection (Agent Frank Statler (Tom Everett))
- Triangle (Greg (Michael Dorman))
- Tron: Legacy (Jarvis (James Frain))
- Troy (Achilles (Brad Pitt))
- The Truth About Charlie (Il-Sang Lee (Park Joong-Hoon))
- Two Brothers (Zerbino (Vincent Scarito))
- Unconditional Love (Dirk S. (Rupert Everett))
- Underwater (W. Lucien (Vincent Cassel))
- Underworld: Blood Wars (Marius (Tobias Menzies))
- An Unfinished Life (Sheriff Crane Curtis (Josh Lucas))
- The Wailing (Il-gwang (Hwang Jung-min))
- Warrior (Brendan Conlon (Joel Edgerton))
- White Boy Rick (Richard Wershe Sr. (Matthew McConaughey))
- White House Down (Carl Killick (Kevin Rankin))
- Written on the Wind (Kyle Hadley (Robert Stack))
- The Yearling (PDDVD edition) (Ezra "Penny" Baxter (Gregory Peck))
- You Don't Mess with the Zohan (Fatoush "Phantom" Hakbarah (John Turturro))
- You, Me and Dupree (Carl Peterson (Matt Dillon))
- The Young Victoria (Lord Melbourne (Paul Bettany))
- Your Highness (Leezar (Justin Theroux))
- Zathura (Astronaut/Walter Budwing (adult) (Dax Shepard))

==== Television ====
- 24 (Larry Moss (Jeffrey Nordling), Hamri Al-Assad (Alexander Siddig))
- The Agency (Matt Callan (Gil Bellows))
- The Americans (Stan Beeman (Noah Emmerich))
- The Andromeda Strain (Major Bill Keane (Ricky Schroder))
- Body of Proof (Dr. Charlie Stafford (Luke Perry))
- Californication (Eddie Nero (Rob Lowe))
- Castle (Marcus Gates (Lee Tergesen))
- Chuck (Cole Barker (Jonathan Cake))
- Criminal Minds (Derek Morgan (Shemar Moore))
- CSI: Crime Scene Investigation (David Hodges (Wallace Langham))
- Desperate Housewives (Rick Coletti (Jason Gedrick))
- Dirty Sexy Money (Reverend Brian Darling Sr. (Glenn Fitzgerald))
- The Dresden Files (Harry Dresden (Paul Blackthorne))
- The Handmaid's Tale (Commander Frederick Waterford (Joseph Fiennes))
- Heroes (Isaac Mendez (Santiago Cabrera))
- It (Eddie Kaspbrak (Dennis Christopher))
- Game of Thrones (Jorah Mormont (Iain Glen))
- Gilmore Girls (Luke Danes (Scott Patterson))
- Legacies (Rafael (Peyton Alex Smith))
- Lost (Desmond Hume (Henry Ian Cusick))
- Moon Knight (Arthur Harrow (Ethan Hawke))
- Nikita (Michael (Shane West))
- Nip/Tuck (Christian Troy (Julian McMahon))
- Numbers (Charlie Eppes (David Krumholtz))
- Obi-Wan Kenobi (The Grand Inquisitor (Rupert Friend))
- Once Upon a Time (Sidney Glass/Magic Mirror (Giancarlo Esposito))
- One Tree Hill (Keith Scott (Craig Sheffer))
- Pan Am (Roger Anderson (David Harbour))
- The Pillars of the Earth (King Stephen (Tony Curran))
- Power Rangers Samurai (Dekker (Ricardo Medina, Jr.))
- Power Rangers Super Samurai (Dekker (Ricardo Medina, Jr.), Eugene "Skull" Skullovitch (Jason Narvy))
- Prison Break (Agent Todd Wheatley (Chris Bruno))
- Project Runway season 2 (Santino Rice (himself))
- Revolution (Miles Matheson (Billy Burke))
- Royal Pains (Henry "Hank" Lawson (Mark Feuerstein))
- Salem's Lot (Ben Mears (Rob Lowe))
- Samantha Who? (Todd Deepler (Barry Watson))
- Spartacus: Blood and Sand (Crixus (Manu Bennett))
- The Strain (Dr. Ephraim Goodweather (Corey Stoll))
- S.W.A.T. (Sergeant II Daniel "Hondo" Harrelson Jr. (Shemar Moore))
- Third Watch (James "Jimmy" Doherty (Eddie Cibrian))
- Torchwood (The Cousin (Chris Butler))
- V (George Sutton (David Richmond-Peck))
- The Vampire Diaries (Alaric Saltzman (Matthew Davis))
- Vegas (Deputy Jack Lamb (Jason O'Mara))
- The Walking Dead (Governor Philip Blake (David Morrissey))
- The West Wing (Congressman Matt Skinner (Charley Lang))
- The Young Pope (Cardinal Andrew Dussolier (Scott Shepherd))

==== Animation ====
- Monkey King: Hero Is Back (Sun Wukong)
- Toy Story 4 (Hamm)
- Toy Story 5 (Hamm)
