= Rose Matafeo =

New Zealand comedian, actress, and TV presenter (born 1992)

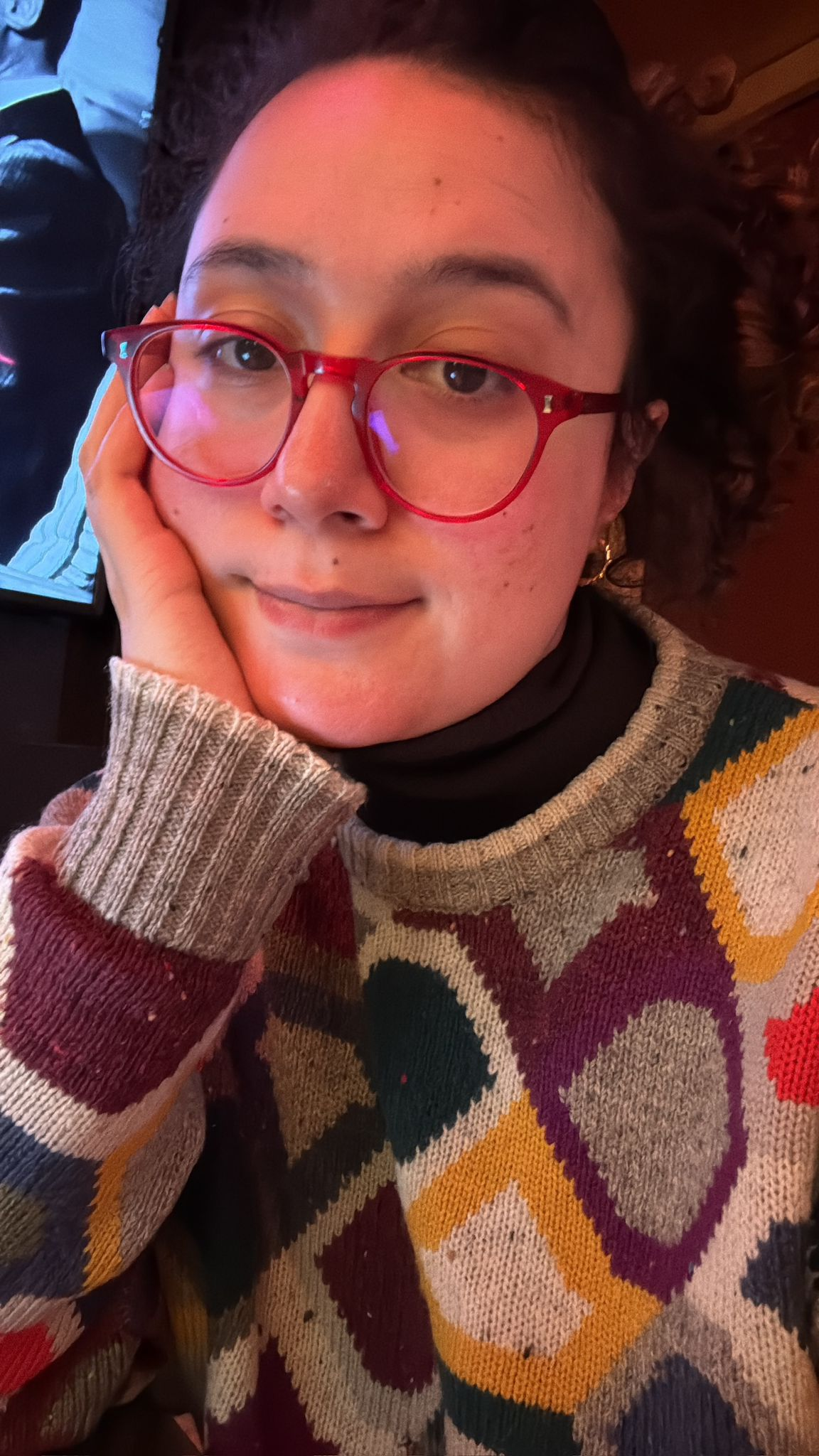
- Matafeo in 2026
- Born: 25 February 1992 (age 34); Auckland, New Zealand
- Occupations: Comedian; actress; writer; television presenter
- Years active: 2007–present
- Awards: Billy T Award (2013); Fred Award (2017); Edinburgh Comedy Award, Best Show (2018)

Rose Matafeo (/ˌmætəˈfeɪoʊ/; born 25 February 1992) is a New Zealand comedian, actress and TV presenter. She was a writer and performer on the New Zealand late-night comedy sketch show Funny Girls. In 2018, she won the Edinburgh Comedy Award for Best Show at the Edinburgh Festival Fringe for her show Horndog.

== Early life ==
Matafeo was born in Auckland, New Zealand, in 1992, to parents John Matafeo and Diane Vuletich. Her parents are Rastafarians, who first met each other through their participation in the same Twelve Tribes of Israel denomination. As a child, Rose attended monthly services with her family at the group's local headquarters in New Lynn, Auckland.

Rose's father, John, is a Samoan man and a first-generation immigrant to New Zealand; he joined the Polynesian Panthers movement when he was a teenager, and went on to work in an administrative role at the Rastafarian Church. Her mother, Diane, is a Pākehā New Zealander of Scottish and Croatian heritage; she works as a teacher, and moved to Kampala, Uganda to teach English in the 2010s.

Matafeo grew up in Ponsonby, Auckland, and attended Auckland Girls' Grammar School, where she was head girl. She has two older brothers. Matafeo has described her upbringing as "quite relaxed".

At the age of 15, Matafeo started doing stand-up comedy through the platform of the "Class Comedians" programme put on by the New Zealand Comedy Trust, and went on to win the "Nailed It on the Night" award at the New Zealand International Comedy Festival in 2007. She has been a regular at the festival since.

== Career ==
Since graduating from the "Class Comedians" programme, Matafeo went on to win best newcomer at the 2010 New Zealand International Comedy Festival. She became a host of the popular comedy festival show "Fanfiction Comedy" in 2012. She has had success with her solo stand-up comedy shows at the festival: Life Lessons I've Learnt from the 60s Based on Things I've Seen on Television (2011), Scout's Honour (2012) and The Rose Matafeo Variety Hour (2013).

Matafeo won the Billy T Award, which recognises the potential of up-and-coming New Zealand comedians, for The Rose Matafeo Variety Hour in 2013, having previously been nominated for her show Scout's Honour in 2012. Her 2014 show at the festival was titled Pizza Party. In 2015, she performed a duo show at the Edinburgh Festival Fringe with Guy Montgomery titled Rose Matafeo and Guy Montgomery Are Friends. On 25 August 2018, Matafeo won the Edinburgh Comedy Award for Best Show at the Edinburgh Festival Fringe, for her show Horndog, collecting a £10,000 prize. She was the first person of colour to win the prestigious award for a solo show, and the first New Zealander. Only four other female solo stand-up comedians had won the award before her.

She was a TV presenter and host of U Live, which ran on the TVNZ U channel from 13 March 2011 until 31 August 2013, when the channel came to an end. Upon TVNZ U finishing, she took on a new role as a writer for Jono and Ben at Ten, a satirical news and comedy sketch show. Matafeo co-created and starred in the New Zealand sketch comedy show Funny Girls for three seasons from 2015 until 2018. She has been playing the role of Talia in the ABC comedy Squinters since 2018.

Matafeo appeared on Jon Richardson: Ultimate Worrier as an investigator into worrisome topics, and also appeared with Richardson in 8 Out of 10 Cats Does Countdown (S19, Ep1), for Channel 4 TV in January 2020. She was a contestant on series three of Richard Osman's House of Games and the ninth series of Taskmaster.

Having toured as a stand-up comedian for ten years, Matafeo said in 2018 that she wanted to "take a break from hour long comedy" and instead act more, write more, and also direct. Matafeo went on to serve as director on five episodes of the 2019 New Zealand TV comedy Golden Boy.

Matafeo had her US television debut as a comedian on Conan O'Brien's talk show Conan on TBS on 9 May 2019.

In 2019, Matafeo appeared on James Acaster and Josh Widdicombe's show Hypothetical on Dave.

She currently hosts the podcast Boners of the Heart with comedian and writer Alice Snedden on the Little Empire Podcast Network. She was a guest on Deborah Frances-White's The Guilty Feminist podcast and on the RHLSTP podcast with Richard Herring.

In 2019, Matafeo directed five episodes in the first season of Golden Boy, a New Zealand sitcom for TV3. In 2020, she returned to the set of Golden Boy in the second season as one of the supporting cast.

In July 2020, Matafeo joined Guy Montgomery on the comedy show Tiny Tour of Aotearoa travelling across New Zealand.

On 20 August 2020, Matafeo's comedy special Horndog was released on HBO Max.

Matafeo was cast as the lead in the 2020 comedy film Baby Done.

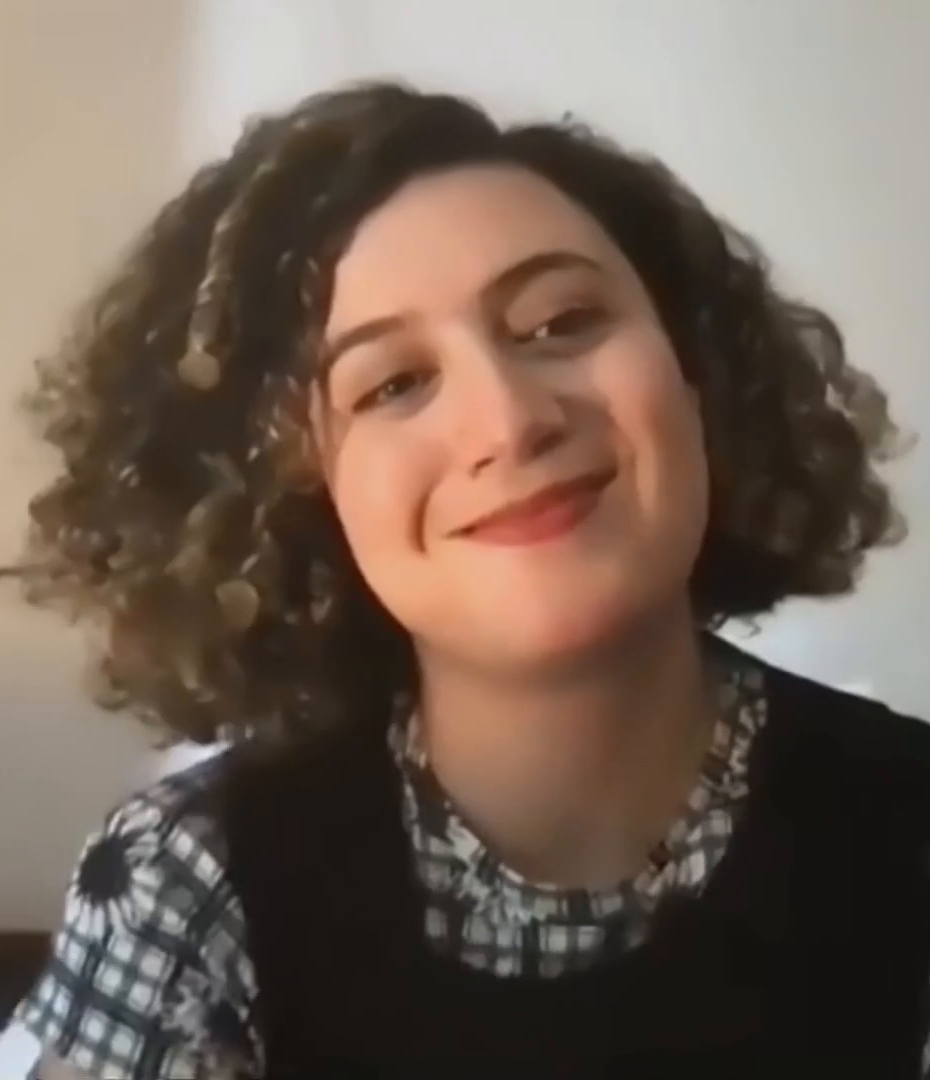
Matafeo in 2021

In April 2021, Starstruck, a six-part rom-com created by and starring Matafeo aired on the BBC (UK), HBO (US), TVNZ (New Zealand), and ABC (Australia). Co-written by Matafeo and Alice Snedden, the cast included actor Nikesh Patel, as leading man and love interest Tom. Filming for the first series was delayed due to the COVID pandemic, however a second series of the show was commissioned before the first series had even begun filming. A third series was released in September 2023.

In 2023, Matafeo guest presented the British quiz show Pointless. In 2024 she appeared in Moana 2 as Loto, an engineer who works on boats, and took up the role of Taskmaster in Junior Taskmaster, a Taskmaster spin-off for children aged 9–11, with Mike Wozniak as the assistant.

In 2026, Matafeo can be seen in New Zealand Spy, a series she co-wrote and in which she co-stars with Paul Williams, Joe Thomas and Bret McKenzie.

== Personal life ==
Matafeo previously dated the New Zealand comedian Guy Williams. In 2015, she moved to London, where her then-boyfriend James Acaster lived; she shared a flat with comedian Nish Kumar. Matafeo and Acaster broke up in 2017.

One of Matafeo's interests is mukbang videos (in which the host eats large amounts of food while interacting with the audience). In July 2018, she decided to make her own mukbang video using takeaways purchased from Double Happy Takeaways in Auckland. It was featured on The Spinoff.

== Filmography ==
=== Film ===
Year	Title	Role	Notes
2018	The Breaker Upperers	Checkout chick	
2020	Baby Done	Zoe	Lead role
2024	Moana 2	Loto (voice)	Also contributed to film's soundtrack

=== Television ===
Year	Title	Role	Notes
2010–2018	7 Days	Self – Team member	11 episodes
2012	Pocket Protectors	Sam (voice)	Animated series
2013	Best Bits	Self – Co-host	4 episodes
2013	Crumbs	Detective Tickleberry / Joan Cornfield (voices)	Animated series
2013–2014	Auckland Daze	Rose	2 episodes
2015–2018	Funny Girls	Rose	Main cast (15 episodes). Writer (1 episode)
2017	Climaxed	Hannah	1 episode: "When He Can't Take the Hint"
2017	W1A	Chloe	2 episodes
2017	The Barefoot Bandits	Gelatina (voice)	Animated series. 1 episode: "Too Much Tumeke"
2018	Temp	Rose	Mini-series. Also writer
2018	Jon Richardson: Ultimate Worrier	Self – Guest	4 episodes
2018–2019	Squinters	Talia	Main cast (12 episodes)
2019	Hypothetical	Self – Guest	Series 1, episode 2
2019	Taskmaster	Self – Contestant	Series 9, 10 episodes
2020	Horndog	Self	Comedy special
2020	Golden Boy	Ruth	7 episodes. Also Director (5 episodes)
2020	Richard Osman's House of Games	Self – Contestant	Series 3, 5 episodes
2021	QI	Self – Panellist	Series S, episode 5: "Sugar & Spice"
2021	Dead Pixels	Daisy	3 episodes: "Raid Boss", "Mission" and "Flanks/Yams"
2021	Landscape Artist of the Year	Self – Contestant	Series 7, episode 9
2021–2023	Starstruck	Jessie	Lead role, creator, writer, 3 series (18 episodes)
2022	Big Fat Quiz of the Year	Self – Panelist	With Jonathan Ross
2023	QI	Self – Panellist	Series T, episode 8: "Ticks Tax Toes"
2023	Pointless	Self – co-host	11 episodes
2023	The Great Stand Up to Cancer Bake Off	Self – Contestant	Series 6, episode 1
2024	Junior Taskmaster	Self – Host/Taskmaster	8 episodes
2024	On and on and On	Self	Comedy special
2026	Make That Movie	Dina	1 episode: "The Rescue Most Brave"
2026	New Zealand Spy	Sue Nightingale	Main cast (6 episodes); also writer
2026	Taskmaster New Zealand	Self – Contestant	Season 7, 10 episodes
