= New Zealand Spy =

New Zealand television series

- First season poster
- Genre: Comedy
- Created by: Paul Williams
- Written by: Paul Williams; Rose Matafeo; Joe Thomas; Bret McKenzie
- Directed by: Tim van Dammen
- Starring: Paul Williams; Rose Matafeo; Joe Thomas; Bret McKenzie
- Music by: Stephen Gallagher; Paul Williams
- Country of origin: New Zealand
- Original language: English
- No. of series: 1
- No. of episodes: 6

Production
- Executive producers: Cam Bakker; Greg Sitch; Paul Williams
- Producer: Bronwyn Bakker
- Cinematography: Tim Flower
- Editors: Luke Earl; Ben Winter; Rhys Green
- Running time: 21–23 minutes
- Production companies: Kevin & Co; BBC Studios

Original release
- Network: TVNZ 2
- Release: 29 April 2026 – present

New Zealand Spy is a New Zealand comedy spy television series created by Paul Williams, written by and starring Williams, Rose Matafeo, Bret McKenzie, and Joe Thomas. The show premiered on TVNZ 2 on 29 April 2026.

== Premise ==
New recruits start at the New Zealand Intelligence Agency in the latter half of the 20th Century, receiving two weeks of training before being sent out on their first spy mission. Lead character Michael is sent to Queenstown, where he is joined by the other two. The three bumble their way through the mission to thwart a plot by the villainous head of the Australian Intelligence Service to assassinate someone. This backstory is revealed after the first episode opens with Michael being chased by a villain skiing across snowy mountains.

== Cast ==
- Paul Williams as Michael Brown / Michael Riviera
- Rose Matafeo as Sue Nightingale
- Joe Thomas as Michael Anderson
- Claudia O'Doherty as Misty Atwood
- Bret McKenzie as Boss
- Abby Howells as Isabelle
- Scotty Cotter as Danyon
- Jay Ryan as Henchman
- Rhys Mathewson as a receptionist
- Tony Armstrong as Magnus
- Andy Lee as Dennis Greene
- Guy Williams
- Joe Daymond
- Jesse Griffin
- Shavaughn Ruakere
- Pax Assadi
- James Mustapic

=== Cameo appearances ===
There are cameo appearances by:

- Tim Key as Hilton
- Sam Campbell as Pellet
- Jackie van Beek

== Episodes ==
No. in series	Title	Directed by	Written by	Original release date
1	"The Recruits"	Tim van Dammen	Paul Williams	29 April 2026
2	"The Games"	Tim van Dammen	Paul Williams	7 May 2026
3	"The Informant"	Tim van Dammen	Paul Williams	13 May 2026
4	"The Train"	Tim van Dammen	Paul Williams	20 May 2026
5	"The Island"	Tim van Dammen	Paul Williams	27 May 2026
6	"The End"	Tim van Dammen	Paul Williams	3 June 2026

== Production ==
The six-part comedy spy series was commissioned by TVNZ and produced by Kevin & Co. It is written by and starring Paul Williams, Rose Matafeo, Joe Thomas and Bret McKenzie (known as one of musical comedy duo Flight of the Conchords). The series is directed by Tim van Dammen. The executive producers are Cam Bakker, Bronwyn Bakker, Greg Sitch, and Paul Williams.

The cast also includes Claudia O'Doherty, Tim Key, Andy Lee, Tony Armstrong and Sam Campbell with Abby Howells, Guy Williams, Joe Daymond, Jackie van Beek, Jesse Griffin, Jay Ryan, Rhys Mathewson, Shavaughan Ruakere, Pax Assadi, Scotty Cotter, and James Mustapic.

Filming took place in Auckland in late 2025. Filming also took place in Christchurch, Marlborough, Queenstown, and the Bay of Islands.

Music was composed by Williams along with Wellington composer Stephen Gallagher, and played by (according to Williams) "some of the best classical musicians in New Zealand".

== Broadcast ==
The series premiered on TVNZ 2 on 29 April 2026, with all episodes streaming on TVNZ+ in New Zealand. BBC Studios are handling worldwide sales, apart from Australia, which was picked up by the Australian Broadcasting Corporation.

The series premiered in on ABC TV in Australia in July 2026, with all six episodes available on ABC iview.

Sky acquired the show in the United Kingdom, broadcasting on Sky One and available on streaming service NOW from 4 September 2026.

== Reception ==
=== Critical reception ===
Tara Ward of The Spinoff called it "a beautiful show to watch – not only does it capture some stunning local scenery, but the interior sets have a gorgeously stylish mid-century vibe", saying that it "looks expensive and feels reminiscent of both a Bond film and Flight of the Conchords". While wondering what the point of it all is, she finds it an "endearingly silly comedy". Lenny Ann Low of The Sydney Morning Herald gave the series 4 out of 5 stars, calling it "a delightfully dry spin on spy thrillers". while the ABC called it "a wacky, deadpan series".

Wenlei Ma wrote in The Nightly: "New Zealand Spy is a scrappy series but it does a lot with not much thanks in large part to its wry and dry humour. Even when it's going for a big gag, it still feels understated in the best way... silly, but it's such a good time". She praised the casting of Australians Andy Lee, Tony Armstrong, and Claudia O'Doherty. Sarah Ward of ScreenHub Australia called the casting of Tony Armstrong "as a suave secret agent...one of those strokes of genius", and the series a "very funny, quickly bingeable new spoof". She praised the cinematography, and highlighted various specific and general parodies in the series, including a scene from The Simpsons' "Cape Feare" episode featuring Sideshow Bob, the Hitchcock film North by Northwest. She says that it recalls the 2004 British hospital/horror spoof Garth Marenghi's Darkplace and the American action/police procedural spoof NTSF:SD:SUV:: (2011-2013). James Croot, writing in The Post, found the series "disappointing", although praised the "Bondian score", costumes, production design, and direction of the action scenes by Tim van Dammen.

=== Accolades ===
During the 2026 New Zealand Screen Awards, New Zealand Spy won one award: "Best Picture Finishing - Series" (Erin Woodhouse).
