= Kid Sister (TV series) =

New Zealand television series

- Genre: Comedy drama
- Directed by: Aidee Walker
- Starring: Simone Nathan; Paul Williams; Amanda Billing; Jeff Szusterman
- Composer: Anna Coddington
- Country of origin: New Zealand
- Original language: English
- No. of series: 2
- No. of episodes: 10

Production
- Executive producer: Harriet Crampton
- Producer: Emily Anderton
- Cinematography: Tammy Williams
- Running time: 23 mins
- Production company: Greenstone TV

Original release
- Network: TVNZ+ (2022–present)
- Release: 22 May 2022 – present

Kid Sister is a semi-autobiographical New Zealand television comedy drama show, created by Simone Nathan for TVNZ+, which premiered on 22 May 2022. Set in Auckland, the show focuses on the family's traditional/Orthodox-adjacent Jewish community. The show streams internationally on ITVX, CBC Gem, Hot/Yes, and Amediateka.

== Cast and characters ==
- Simone Nathan as Lulu Emanuel
- Paul Williams as Ollie, Lulu's boyfriend
- Amanda Billing as Keren Emanuel, Lulu's South African Jewish mother
- Jeff Szusterman as Siggy Emanuel, Lulu's father
- Joseph Nathan as Leo Emanuel, Lulu's brother
- Kira Josephson as Bec, Lulu's sister-in-law
- Peter Hayden as Hershey
- Roxie Mohebbi as Sina
- Ari Boyland as Rabbi Rob

== Plot ==
The first season explores family tensions when the Jewish protagonist, Lulu (Simone Nathan) begins a relationship with a non-Jewish man, Ollie (Paul Williams). Her parents, Siggy (Jeff Szusterman) and Keren (Amanda Billing) are insistent that she marries within the faith. The situation becomes more complicated when Lulu learns that she is pregnant. The second season deals with Lulu's journey after the baby's birth, and her relationship with Ollie while he becomes dedicated to his conversion to Judaism.

== Production ==
The show partially draws from the real-life experience of the creator, Simone Nathan; her real-life husband (co-star Paul Williams) has gone through the process of converting to Orthodox Judaism.

Kid Sister was filmed in Auckland, with synagogue scenes taking place at Auckland Hebrew Congregation, a Modern Orthodox synagogue on Greys Avenue. The show received funding from NZ On Air of $822,350 for season one, and $1,273,486 for season two.

=== Release ===
The second season was released internationally in December 2023, by ITVX in the United Kingdom, the CBC Gem in Canada, and Hot/Yes in Israel. It will be released on TVNZ+ in New Zealand in 2024.

== Reception ==
The show was positively reviewed by the Israeli newspaper Haaretz, with Adrian Hennigan praising the casting, storytelling and comparing it favourably with Shiva Baby. The show has also been compared to Fleabag due to its antihero central character, ensemble cast, and use of voiceover, among other elements.

In New Zealand, the show was praised with Stuff describing it as "a confident, bold debut full of chutzpah that deserves to find an audience, both among 'insiders' and Kiwis from all walks of life". Stuff also praised the casting, particularly the parents played by Billing and Szusterman.
