= Gary Williams (New Zealand cricketer) =

New Zealand cricketer (1953–2025)

Personal information
- Full name: Gary John Williams
- Born: 11 March 1953; Dunedin, New Zealand
- Died: 8 November 2025 (aged 72); Kohimarama Beach, Auckland, New Zealand
- Batting: Right-handed
- Role: Wicket-keeper
- Relatives: Guy Williams (son); Paul Williams (son)

Domestic team information
- Years: Team
- 1975/76–1977/78: Otago

Career statistics
Competition	First-class
Matches	8
Runs scored	127
Batting average	12.70
100s/50s	0/1
Top score	60
Catches/stumpings	2/2
- Source: ESPNcricinfo, 7 February 2026

Gary John Williams (11 March 1953 – 8 November 2025) was a New Zealand cricketer, table tennis player and businessman. He played eight first-class matches for Otago between the 1975–76 and 1977–78 seasons, and represented Bermuda in table tennis at the 1985 world championships.

== Early life ==
Williams was born in Dunedin on 11 March 1953, and grew up in Mosgiel. He was educated at Otago Boys' High School, where he captained the school's 1st XV rugby union team. He went on to study at the University of Otago, where he earned a degree in accountancy.

In 1967 and 1968, Williams was the New Zealand under-16 boys' singles table tennis champion, and in 1968 he won the national under-18 mixed doubles table tennis title.

== Cricket ==
Williams played for the New Zealand Schools team in the early 1970s, including touring Australia with the team in 1970–71, and played age-group cricket for Otago from the 1971–72 season. He went on to make his first-class debut for the representative team in December 1975 against Auckland at Carisbrook, recording a duck in the first innings and scoring nine runs in the second.

A batsman who was considered a candidate to open the Otago innings with Ken Rutherford ahead of the first match of the following season, Williams played in six matches for Otago during 1976–77, scoring 94 runs, including his only half-century in first-class cricket. The innings, against Auckland in January 1977, in which he scored 60 runs was described as "a long, stubborn knock" which almost saved the game for Otago. A single match during the 1977–78 season against the New Zealand under-23 team marked the end of his first-class career.

== Years in Bermuda ==
In 1980, Williams moved to Bermuda, where he managed Kentucky Fried Chicken, and met his wife, Roseanne. In 1985, Williams anchored the Bermuda team at the World Table Tennis Championships in Gothenburg, and later that year he led the team to its best-ever finish at the US Open team championships.

== Return to New Zealand ==
Gary and Roseanne Williams returned to New Zealand in 1987 to raise a family. Their children include the comedians Guy and Paul Williams.

Williams was owner/operator of two McDonald's franchises, in central Nelson and Tāhunanui. After he retired, Williams managed the Nelson Giants basketball team. He also supported basketball in Nelson as a sponsor of junior basketball, as well as Nelson College and Nelson representative teams.

Williams served on the organising committee for the 2014 World Veterans Table Tennis Championship in Auckland, and went on to be the chair of Table Tennis New Zealand from 2015 to 2018. He also served as president of the North Shore Table Tennis Association until his death in 2025.

== Horse racing ==
Williams was involved for many years in horse racing and had shares in both gallopers and harness horses. He had a share in the winners of over 500 races across the codes including syndicate interests in:

- Auckland Trotting Club Syndicate Group 1 winners, Changeover, Tintin In America, Matai Mackenzie and Ideal Belle. Changeover won the 2008 New Zealand Trotting Cup.
- Breckon Farm Syndicate Group 1 winners Luby Lou, Partyon, Tickle Me Pink, Bettor Twist, A Bettor You and High Energy.

Williams joined the Auckland Trotting Club and was a race night steward.

Williams was also a part owner of top gallopers:

- Xcellent, winner of four Group 1 races including the New Zealand Derby and Kelt Capital Stakes as well as placing 3rd in the 2005 Melbourne Cup.
- Pasta Post, winner of the Easter Handicap and City of Auckland Cup with Pasta Post
- Leaderboard, winner of the Wellington Cup and the Grand National Steeplechase in Australia.

== Death ==
Williams died at Kohimarama Beach in Auckland on 8 November 2025, at the age of 72, after having a heart attack during his habitual morning swim. His funeral was held at St Ignatius Catholic Church in St Heliers, and his body was cremated at Purewa Crematorium.
