= Jeff Szusterman =

New Zealand voice, film and television actor

- Born: February 6, 1969 (age 57); New Zealand
- Occupation: Actor
- Years active: 1979–present
- Spouse: Jacque Drew

Jeff Szusterman (born February 6, 1969) is a New Zealand voice, film and television actor known for playing Master Xandred on Power Rangers Samurai.

He graduated from Toi Whakaari: New Zealand Drama School in 1995 with a Diploma in Acting.

He is Jewish, of Polish-Ukrainian descent. In the 2022 comedy series, Kid Sister, he plays the New Zealand Jewish patriarch figure. Along with his on-screen wife Amanda Billing, the pair were praised by Stuff for their scene-stealing roles.

Along with his wife, actress Jacque Drew, Szusterman runs a theatre company called "Still Water Rising". Among the plays he's directed are My First Time at the Fortune Theatre in Dunedin, Mojo, and A History of the American Film. At the 25th annual Drammy Awards in 2001, Szusterman won 'Best Actor in a Lead Role' for his work in Not About Heroes?.

Szusterman is on the board of the performers union Equity New Zealand.

== Filmography ==
=== Film ===
Year	Title	Role	Notes
2000	The Shirt	Nick	
2010	Licked	George	Short
2010	Eeling	Husband	Short
2017	6 Days	Intelligence Translator	
2018	Mute	Mo	Short
2018	A War Story	Chad	
2019	Guns Akimbo	News Reader	
2020	Waitress	Mark	Short
2023	Uproar	Andrew	

=== Television ===
Year	Title	Role	Notes
1996	Return to Treasure Island	Jacob	TV movie
1998	The Legend of William Tell	Voss	1 episode
2005	Hercules	Silenys/Satyr	2 episodes
2006	Doves of War	Michael Kadir	6 episodes
2009	Emilie Richards	Jeffrey Trench	1 episode
2009	The Cult	Doctor	1 episode
2009	The Jaquie Brown Diaries	Randall	5 episodes
2009-2010	Legend of the Seeker	Soldier/Captain Frannick	2 episodes
2011-2012	Power Rangers Samurai	Master Xandred/Octoroo	44 episodes
2014	The Brokenwood Mysteries	Rob Visnic	1 episode
2015-2016	Power Rangers Dino Charge	City Worker/Scrapper	3 episodes
2017	Why Does Love?	Nico	TV movie
2018	Ash vs Evil Dead	Sheriff	1 episode
2019	Golden Boy		1 episode
2019	Jonah	Photographer	1 episode
2021	The Gulf	Joe Daysh	2 episodes
2022-present	Kid Sister	Siggy	Series regular
