= Kept =

- Genre: Reality
- Created by: Deborah Adler Myers; Mark Ganshirt
- Directed by: Glenn Taylor
- Starring: Jerry Hall
- Country of origin: United States
- Original language: English
- No. of seasons: 1
- No. of episodes: 10

Production
- Executive producers: Michael Canter; Sam Korkis
- Producers: Keri Flint; Dave Hoffman; Steve Korkis; Scott Lapatine
- Running time: 60 minutes

Original release
- Network: VH1
- Release: May 29 – August 4, 2005

Kept is a reality television series that centered on Jerry Hall (model and ex-wife to Mick Jagger) searching for a kept man. The show premiered on the American cable network VH1 in late May 2005. When Hall narrowed the list down to twelve, she spirited them off to London and eliminated them one by one.

The final three consisted of Anwar, Austen and Seth. In the August 4 finale, Hall was torn between Austen and Seth but ultimately chose Seth as he knew how to have fun and she thought he had matured throughout the process. Seth claims that he got his $100,000 in prize money but after filming stopped he never saw Jerry, the penthouse apartment, or the Lamborghini again.

== Contestants ==
Show cast

- Seth Frye
- Austen Earl
- Jon Benarroch
- Brian Bergdoll
- Mike Biloto
- Maurizio Farhad
- Jason Fromer
- Anwar Jenkins
- Jeanne Marine
- Ricardo Medina, Jr.
- Devonric Johnson
- Mike Piloto
- Frank Trigg
- Slavco Tuskaloski

== Controversy ==
The show, when aired in the United Kingdom on the channel VH1 UK, caused a small controversy when adverts were banned from London Underground stations. The posters in question depicted Jerry Hall holding a leash, surrounded by several young semi-dressed men, and this violated London Underground's policy of adverts featuring people as sex objects. However, the posters were on display in other locations including mainline railway stations.
