= Power Rangers Samurai =

Television series

- The logo for Power Rangers Samurai (first season)
- Also known as: Power Rangers Super Samurai
- Genre: Action; Adventure; Fantasy; Superhero; Martial Arts
- Created by: Haim Saban; Toei Company
- Based on: Samurai Sentai Shinkenger by Toei Company
- Developed by: Saban Brands; Toei Company
- Showrunner: Jonathan Tzachor
- Starring: Alex Heartman; Erika Fong; Hector David Jr; Najee De-Tiege; Brittany Anne Pirtle; Rene Naufahu; Felix Ryan; Paul Schrier; Steven Skyler; Rick Medina
- Opening theme: "Go Go Power Rangers"
- Composer: Noam Kaniel
- Countries of origin: United States; Japan
- Original language: English
- No. of seasons: 2
- No. of episodes: 45

Production
- Executive producers: Haim Saban; Jonathan Tzachor
- Producer: Sally Campbell
- Production locations: New Zealand (Auckland Region) (Auckland); Japan (Greater Tokyo Area) (Tokyo, Saitama, Yokohama) and Kyoto)
- Cinematography: Ilan Rosenberg
- Running time: 23 minutes
- Production companies: Saban Brands; Power Rangers Productions; Toei Company; MarVista Entertainment

Original release
- Network: Nickelodeon
- Release: February 7, 2011 – December 15, 2012

Related
- Power Rangers television series

Power Rangers Samurai is a television series and the seventeenth entry of the Power Rangers franchise, which is based on the Japanese Super Sentai Series. The season was the first to be produced by Saban Brands after it acquired the franchise from The Walt Disney Company. The season marks the franchise's debut on Nickelodeon, premiering on February 7, 2011.

Samurai uses props, footage, script, and characteristics from Samurai Sentai Shinkenger and, according to press material, had a "brighter tone and an infusion of fun and comedy that wasn't present in seasons 16 and 17." Samurai is also the first season to be shot and broadcast in 16:9 widescreen and in HD. Though 2006's Boukenger (which was adapted into Operation Overdrive) was the first Super Sentai series to be shot in widescreen using Super 35 and Super 16 mm film, preceding Power Rangers seasons were not. However, Shinkenger was also the first Sentai series to be filmed with an HD camera at 720p resolution through Go-Busters. Samurai also returns the series to a multi-seasonal format; the second season, titled Power Rangers Super Samurai, began on February 18, 2012 and is officially considered the nineteenth season overall.

== Synopsis ==
Centuries ago in Japan, a race of monsters known as the Nighloks invaded the Earth, but were defeated by a team of five samurai warriors who utilised supernatural kanji symbols to counter the Nighlok invasion. These warriors were the first Samurai Power Rangers, and they later passed down the knowledge of their symbol power to their children who continued the fight against the Nighloks. For hundreds of years, successive generations of the Samurai Rangers have defended the Earth from the Nighlok threat. When the ruler of the Nighloks, the evil Master Xandred, returns once more, the eighteenth generation of Samurai Power Rangers must assemble to prevent Xandred and his army from flooding the planet with the waters of the Sanzu River to bring about the end of civilization.

The team is made up of Red Ranger Jayden Shiba, a skilled and stoic leader; Blue Ranger Kevin, a devoted second-in-command who values tradition and organisation; Pink Ranger Mia Watanabe, the compasionate "big sister" of the group; Green Ranger Mike, a rebel jokester with a creative mind; and Yellow Ranger Emily, the youngest and most innocent of the group. They are later joined by Gold Ranger Antonio Garcia, an excitable fisherman and tech genius who was not born into the Samurai life like the rest of the team but instead created his own Ranger powers with technology.

== Promotion ==
Saban announced they would be enacting an "aggressive" multimedia focus, with planned apps, games, streaming content, and social media content in addition to live shows and a feature film. The run-up to the new series was promoted by 145 Days of Power Rangers, a daily airing of every Mighty Morphin episode in order. An official Power Rangers Facebook page was also created.

On November 24, 2010, the Power Rangers website placed a trailer for the show online, hosted on Yahoo! Kids. The new Samurai Rangers also appeared at the 2010 Macy's Thanksgiving Day Parade.

Paul Schrier has a recurring role in the season, reprising his role as Bulk originating from Mighty Morphin Power Rangers. Jason Narvy subsequently reprised his role as Skull in the final episode.

For the second batch of episodes airing in 2012, Saban began promoting the season with the title of "Super Samurai" to reflect the upgrades to the Rangers powers (glimpsed already in "Clash of the Red Rangers The Movie"). Actor Hector David, Jr., released an official teaser poster for "Super Samurai" on his Facebook profile.

== Cast and characters ==
Rangers

- Alex Heartman as Jayden Shiba, the first Red Samurai Ranger
- Erika Fong as Mia Watanabe, the Pink Samurai Ranger
- Hector David Jr. as Mike, the Green Samurai Ranger
- Najee De-Tiege as Kevin, the Blue Samurai Ranger
- Brittany Anne Pirtle as Emily, the Yellow Samurai Ranger
- Steven Skyler as Antonio Garcia, the Gold Samurai Ranger
- Kimberley Crossman as Lauren Shiba, the second Red Samurai Ranger

Supporting characters

- Rene Naufahu as Mentor Ji
- Felix Ryan as Spike Skullovitch
- Paul Schrier as Farkas "Bulk" Bulkmeier

Villains

- Rick Medina as Deker
- Jeff Szusterman as the voices of Master Xandred and Octoroo
- Kate Elliott as the voice of Dayu
- Derek Judge as the voice of Serrator
- Cameron Rhodes as the voice of Professor Cog
- Geoff Dolan as the voice of Sergeant Tread
- John Dybvig as the voice of General Gut

Guest stars

- Eka Darville as Scott Truman, RPM Ranger Operator Series Red (voice only, uncredited)
- Jason Narvy as Eugene "Skull" Skullovitch

== Episodes ==
=== Season 1: Power Rangers Samurai (2011) ===
No. overall	No. in season	Title	Directed by	Written by	Original release date
1	1	"Origins"	Peter Salmon	David Schneider & James W. Bates	October 15, 2011
2	2	"Origins"	Peter Salmon	Jill Donnellan & James W. Bates	October 22, 2011
Part 1: When the Nighloks are revived and begin to attack the mortal realm, Jayden of the Shiba Clan takes arms to fight them as the Red Ranger. After defeating the company of Moogers, Jayden is informed by his mentor, Ji, that he must assemble his team of Samurai Rangers instead of fighting on his own. Meanwhile, on the Sanzu River, the incredibly powerful Master Xandred finally awakens. Upon learning that the Samurai Rangers still exist, he becomes enraged and sends the Nighlok Tooya to attack the humans with an army of Moogers. Ji summons four other warriors: Olympic swimmer Kevin, kindergarten teacher Mia, carefree gamer Mike, and pure-hearted country-girl Emily. Upon meeting the four, Jayden gives each one a chance to back out of his crusade, and when all four decline, he gives each one a Samuraizer phone. Jayden, Emily, Kevin, Mia, and Mike then take on Tooya and his numerous Moogers. Red Ranger defeats Tooya, but despite that, he tells his teammates to remain on their guard. Sure enough, the Nighlok is reborn as his secondary form, a titanic mega-monster, so the Samurai Rangers enlarge their Foldingzords to confront and destroy him. After the battle, Ji welcomes Emily, Kevin, Mia, and Mike into the Shiba House. All five warriors become full-fledged Power Rangers. Part 2: After joining Jayden as his teammates, Emily, Kevin, Mia, and Mike begin their transition into Samurai Rangers. However, while Mike spars with Kevin, Emily disappears. Kevin, Mia, and Mike discover her practising at a nearby park, revealing her reasons for becoming a Samurai Ranger. Meanwhile, Bulk is reunited with Spike, the son of his best friend Skull, and he becomes committed to training his nephew into becoming a samurai. When the Nighlok Scorpionic appears, four of the Samurai Rangers deal with the Moogers while the Red Ranger fights the new Nighlok. During the battle, Red Ranger keeps a young girl out of harm's way before the Rangers defeat Scorpionic with their combined Spin Sword attacks. But when Scorpionic revives into a Mega Monster, the Rangers combine their Foldingzords to form the Samurai Megazord to destroy him and his giant Mooger army. After the battle, Ji congratulates the Rangers while Mike uses his symbol ability to create confetti before dancing all over the house. Note: This episode was aired out of order after the season had already premiered, aside from the specials.
3	3	"The Team Unites"	Peter Salmon	David Schneider and James W. Bates	February 7, 2011
The Samurai Rangers are seen training, but Mike can't seem to sense Jayden or Kevin's attacks. Mike soon leaves practice to hang out with his friends, telling them of his struggles. However, the city is attacked by the Nighlok Rofer, sent by Xandred to raise the Sanzu River's water levels with human fear. Even in his Ranger form, Mike is no match for Rofer as the others arrive, and the monster falls back to rehydrate in the Sanzu River. Jayden explains to Mike that being a Samurai Ranger is the ultimate sacrifice and must stay away from his friends and family to protect them. After giving it thought, Mike gets an idea and starts to train himself as Jayden undergoes his training. The next day, when Rofer resumes his attack, Mike again takes on the Nighlok on his own, tricking him into tangling up his elongated arms. Mike then executes the finishing move. When Nighlok is revived and enlarged, despite Mike's intent to finish him off himself, the Rangers form their Megazord and use Jayden's training to finish the monster off.
4	4	"Deal With a Nighlok"	Luke Robinson	Jill Donnellan and Jonathan Rosenthal	February 13, 2011
After confronting the Nighlok Doubletone, the Rangers search for the young boy whom the monster was talking to, a little leaguer named Ryan. Kevin and Mia find the boy, only to refuse to answer them as he runs off. Following him to his home to learn whatever secret he has, the two get into a discussion of Kevin's regret of his life-long dream that he has been keeping to himself, before Mia assures him he'll live his dream once Xandred is defeated. After an all-night stakeout, Kevin and Mia find Ryan as he suddenly disposes of his baseball stuff and calls Doubletone as he performs his promise, hurting himself so he cannot play baseball to get his father back. However, as the garbage truck arrived to take out the trash, Doubletone revealed it to be a lie as part of his plan to make the boy give up his dream to raise the Sanzu River. Vowing to make the Nighlok pay, Kevin and Mia fight him as the others arrive, defeating Doubletone as he revives into a giant before Samurai Megazord destroys him. Later, the Rangers attend Ryan's game after the boy learns the sanitation worker saved his stuff and gave it to his coach, with Jayden using his Symbol Power to make Ryan's dream a vision for a short while.
5	5	"Day Off"	Luke Robinson	David Schneider and Jill Donnellan	February 20, 2011
While the others spend their leisure time at the Rainbow's End amusement park, Jayden remains behind to master the use of the Beetle Disk as the rest of the team encounters the Nighlok Dreadhead, whose flexible body and marksmanship overpower them. Even with the Red Ranger's arrival, the team is no match for Dreadhead before he falls back when he begins to dry up. After revealing the Beetle Disc to the others, Jayden resumes training into the night, nearly destroying himself in the process. The next day, a rehydrated Dreadhead resumes his attack, with the other Rangers arriving to fight him as Jayden arrives and succeeds in using the Beetle Disc to have his Fire Smasher assume Cannon Blast Mode to destroy Dreadhead. When Dreadhead resurrects into a giant, he overwhelms Samurai Megazord until Jayden uses the Beetle Disc to summon the Beetle Zord. To counter the summoned giant Moogers, the Beetle Blaster Megazord is formed to take them out before destroying Dreadhead. After the fight, Jayden joins the others at the amusement park.
6	6	"Sticks & Stones"	Luke Robinson	Jill Donnellan and David Schneider	February 27, 2011
During battle training, Emily accidentally injures Mike in the arm, with Emily's attempts to care for his arm making a mess of everything. The Nighlok Negatron appears and subjects his victims to insults that hurt their feelings so deeply that the verbal abuse becomes a physical assault. Confronting him, all the Rangers are struck down by Negatron's attacks, save for Emily, who is unaffected as the Nighlok is forced to retreat. When her teammates wonder about her immunity to Negatron's attacks, Emily tells them how her sister Serena taught her to ignore insults and how you need to keep thinking that the person never even said it. When Negatron resumes his attack, Emily weakens him with Mike's help as Jayden destroys him with the five-disc Beetle Cannon. Negatron revives as a Mega Monster, and the Rangers destroy him with the Beetle Blaster Megazord. Later, the Rangers are seen walking along the sidewalk while Mike carries Emily, who loses consciousness at the end of the fight. Mia hears an ice cream truck, and Emily, who has been faking unconsciousness for a few minutes, pretends to wake up so they can all get ice cream. Note: This episode was featured in the 2013 Colours of Courage Marathon.
7	7	"A Fish Out of Water"	Peter Salmon	David Schneider and James W. Bates	March 6, 2011
While having breakfast, the Rangers learn that the Swordfish Zord has been sighted off the coast as the noxious Nighlok Yamaror appears. While the others go after Yamaror, poisoned by his intense stench. As a result, Kevin is sent to acquire the Zord by fishing for it. But after failed attempts to catch it, Kevin receives the aid of a fisherman before being contacted by Ji and being told that the others got poisoned and the Swordfish Zord is needed to cure them. As Jayden slows Yamiror down despite the poison's pain, Kevin finally manages to fish the Zord out with the fisherman's help. After curing his teammates of Yamaror's poison before using the Fire Smasher's 5-Disc Swordfish Cannon mode to defeat the Nighlok, Kevin summons the Swordfish Zord to battle the mega monster before having it form the Swordfish Fencer Megazord. As the Rangers spent a day at the beach, a mysterious figure who witnessed the Rangers' fight with Yamiror walks off into the night.
8	8	"There Go the Brides"	Peter Salmon	Jill Donnellan and Jonathan Rosenthal	March 13, 2011
Dayu and the Moogers start kidnapping brides, so the Rangers use a fake wedding to try to trap her. After she doesn't show, they make Jayden and Mia pose as another couple at a wedding, which leads to Mia being kidnapped. However, Dayu didn't notice the trap and also kidnapped the "real" bride, who turns out to be Emily, in disguise. After sending the replica symbol power Rangers into an ambush, the Rangers challenge Dayu to a battle in the nearby forest and quarry. However, another Nighlok named Deker shows up to save Dayu. A brief fight ensues where Jayden's skill draws the attention of Deker, who says that Jayden is the opponent he's been searching for. Dayu and Deker return to the Netherworld, but not before summoning Giant Moogers to finish the job.
9	9	"I've Got a Spell on Blue"	Peter Salmon	David Schneider and Jill Donnellan	March 20, 2011
Upon returning to the Netherworld, Deker asks Master Xandred for permission to go after Jayden, which Xandred agrees to. The Nighlok Madimot then shows Xandred that he found and possessed the previous Red Samurai Ranger's Tiger Zord and claimed it as his pet. Madimot attacks in the forest, and the Rangers rush towards the Nighlok. Madimot fires a blast at Mike, but Kevin gets in the way and takes the blast. Kevin becomes possessed by Madimot, and Madimot orders him to attack the others. Kevin fights Jayden, and Jayden rushes towards Madimot, but he is forced to get Emily, Mia, and Mike out of there. Kevin and Madimot attack a construction site, and the Rangers arrive. Madimot demands that Jayden fight Kevin one-on-one, which Jayden reluctantly agrees to. Deker, who has returned to the human world to spy on Jayden, is revealed to be a human-Nighlok hybrid with the ability to switch between human and Nighlok forms. In his human form, he watches the fight between Jayden and Kevin, explaining to the other Rangers why Jayden is the superior warrior. Jayden frees Kevin from Madimot's control and wins the fight. Deker leaves, with the fight cementing his belief that Jayden is the "ultimate opponent" for him to duel one day. The five rangers then attack Madimot and destroy the Nighlok. Madimot returns as a mega monster and summons the Tiger Zord; the other Rangers get into their zords, and Jayden's Lion Foldingzord battles the Tiger Zord and frees it. With the Megazord fused with the Tiger Zord, they finish Madimot once and for all.
10	10	"Forest for the Trees"	Jonathan Brough	Jill Donnellan and Seth Walther	March 27, 2011
Jayden and Ji tell the others that the Tiger Zord, the Swordfish Zord, and the Beetle Zord can combine into the Samurai Battlewing, a bird-like Megazord, and they try to find a fitting pilot for each support zord. Jayden keeps the Tiger Disc, Kevin keeps the Swordfish Disc, and the Beetle Disc is given to Mia, much to Mike's dismay, making him jealous in the process. Mike starts to train harder than usual, but he thinks he can't catch up to Jayden and Kevin's progress. Then, when the Rangers face a new Nighlok named Desperaino, who uses the "loss of hope," Kevin attaches his Swordfish Disc onto the Hydro Bow to try to stop it. When Mia tries to attach the Beetle Disc onto her Sky Fan, the Nighlok knocks it away, and Mike catches the disc. Against the others' protests, Mike attaches the Beetle Disc onto his Forest Spear, but when Kevin and Mike try to launch attacks on the Nighlok, the Forest Spear doesn't work, and the Nighlok gets away. After the battle, Ji scolds Mike for acting so foolishly and jeopardising the team's mission. Subsequently, after locating Mike at an arcade, Ji leads him to a clearing and tries to teach him about harnessing the Forest Symbol. Then, after another encounter with the Nighlok, Mike destroys him. After a final offensive on the enlarged monster by the Samurai Battlewing auxiliary Zord combination, the Rangers celebrate victory. Mia allows Mike to keep the Beetle disc. Mike creates a plant for Ji to symbolise their growing "friendship."
11	11	"Test of the Leader"	Jonathan Brough	David Schneider and Samuel P. McLean	April 10, 2011
Master Xandred is troubled by how much Deker knows about his past and the Seal that defeated him. Furious, he called upon giant and standard Moogers to attack the city, destroying everything. Bulk and Spike encountered the Moogers and tried to put up a fight, but they ended up running for their lives instead. The Pink Ranger rescues Spike, and he begins to develop a crush on her. The girls battle the standard Moogers while the boys take on the giant Moogers in the Samurai Battlewing. Later, a powerful new Nighlok named Robtish appears and challenges Jayden to a duel. The other Rangers follow on and are defeated by the Nighlok's power. When the Nighlok aims at the Red Ranger, Deker appears, announcing that the Red Ranger is his opponent. Then the Rangers fight in a triple threat match when the Nighlok ends up drying out and retreating to the Sanzu River. Jayden and Deker continue to fight, but Jayden is defeated, and he takes a minor blow. Mike calls for Ji to bring help so that Emily and Kevin can be brought back to the Shiba house. Back at the Shiba House, Jayden secretly leaves his comrades and goes on a journey alone to protect them.
12	12	"Jayden's Challenge"	Jonathan Brough	Jill Donnellan and James W. Bates with David Schneider	April 17, 2011
Jayden leaves the Shiba House to keep the other Rangers out of danger. Meanwhile, Emily and Kevin start to feel better, and they worry about Jayden. Kevin tells the group that he had an idea of combining the Samurai Battlewing with the Megazord. In the Sanzu River, Octoroo says Master Xandred won't be happy when he finds out Jayden is still alive. Robtish replies he couldn't finish Jayden off because of a half-human, and Dayu (who is also half-human but with no human form) thinks it is Deker. Xandred awakens, angered by the fact that Deker is "helping" the Rangers, and sends his Moogers to fight Deker. This leads him to get into a fight with Deker himself, which leads to Deker using his human form to escape the Netherworld. Jayden wanders around the city at night, and the next day, he finds a boy crying because he misses his father, who is currently at work. Jayden says that he misses his father, who is presumed dead after his final battle with the forces of Master Xandred. Jayden creates a paper aeroplane for the boy, like his father did with him, and soon, the other children playing around make paper aeroplanes as well. Jayden says in his mind it should always be monster-free until Robtish and some more Moogers arrive. He fights them and is soon helped out by the other Rangers. Jayden now believes he needs his team to succeed. When Robtish turns into a mega monster after being destroyed by the Five-Disc Tiger Cannon, they destroy him with Kevin's new idea for the Battlewing Megazord, a Samurai combination of Megazord and the Samurai Battlewing.
13	13	"Unexpected Arrival"	Akihiro Noguchi	David Schneider and Seth Walther	April 30, 2011
The Gap Sensor is activated but the Rangers are unable to locate the Nighlok, leading them to believe it must have been a false alarm, before an arrow is shot into the Shiba House, with a note reading "see you soon" attached. Later that evening, Jayden senses a Nighlok presence within the house and becomes paranoid, although the presence disappears that night as he washes his face. The next day, the other Rangers decide to investigate the issue with the Gap Sensor, only to encounter a local fish vendor whose handwriting matches the note on the arrow. After being confronted, the vendor spills his ice cooler, causing the Rangers to slip while the vendor escapes. Jayden, meanwhile, visits a valley by a lake to practice the sealing symbol, only to meet a fox-themed Nighlok named Vulpes, who has been spying on Jayden using his mirror. Jayden explains that as Vulpes' presence in the Shiba House disappeared when he splashed water on his face, he worked out that being in the presence of water from the human world would counter the Nighlok's spying, as Earth's water is more pure than the water in the Sanzu River. With the water in the lake having the same effect, Vulpes is forced to meet Jayden face-to-face, before Mia and Kevin arrive to provide backup. Emily and Mike are initially tasked with tracking down the fish vendor, but as Vulpes overpowers the other Rangers, they abandon the task and come to help. Even all five Rangers are no match for the Nighlok, as Vulpes defeats them and forces them back into their demorphed state. Out of nowhere, the fish vendor arrives, throwing sushi at Vulpes before revealing his own morpher and transforming into a Ranger form of his own, dubbing himself the Gold Samurai Ranger. As the other Rangers look on in shock and confusion, the Gold Ranger effortlessly defeats Vulpes' Moogers, moving at a speed faster than the eye can see, before defeating Vulpes himself. After the Nighlok returns as a mega monster, the other five Rangers form the Battlewing Megazord, but they are struggling to make any progress. The Gold Ranger reveals he also has his own Zord, the Octo Zord, which Jayden is visibly shocked by. The Gold Ranger pilots the Octo Zord to weaken the Nighlok so the Battlewing Megazord can land the deathblow. After the fight, the Rangers confront the Gold Ranger, who demorphs and calls Jayden "Jay". This, along with the presence of the Octo Zord, causes Jayden to realise that the new Ranger is his childhood best friend Antonio, who moved away when the two were children. A flashback shows that before he moved, Jayden gave the Octo Zord to Antonio, who responded by telling Jayden that once he grew up and became the Red Ranger, he would come back and be a Samurai too.
14	14	"Room for One More"	Akihiro Noguchi	Jill Donnellan and Jonathan Rosenthal	May 7, 2011
As Antonio heads to the Shiba House to formally apply to join the team, the others listen to Jayden and Ji talk about what he was like as a child. Ji had not been aware of Jayden giving Antonio the Octo Zord at first, telling the team that once he did find out, Jayden threatened to quit his training if Ji tried to get it back. Jayden is embarrassed by this story as Antonio makes a fancy entrance, only for his fishhook to rip his pants. Antonio explains that after moving away, he spent years training to be a Samurai, building his morpher from a trashed cellphone. His breakthrough came once he worked out how to use the morpher to communicate with Octo Zord digitally, allowing him to build electronic symbols to replicate the Rangers' symbol power. Despite the team acknowledging Antonio's skill, Ji refuses to let him become a Ranger as he has no formal training. Ji goes as far as to confiscate Antonio's morpher. Antonio begs Jayden to intervene, but after some time Jayden says he agrees with Ji. As the Rangers are called away to fight the Nighlok Steeleto, he gives them a hard timer Steeleto retreats when he starts to dry up, prompting discussions around how the team should deal with him. Mia argues that the best strategy would be adding Antonio to the team, engaging in a heated training duel with Jayden where she gets the upper hand by interrogating Jayden on his real motives for not wanting Antonio to become a Ranger. Jayden is led to admit that he would blame himself if Antonio was hurt or killed in battle. After a talk with the rest of the team, who all point out that Antonio knows the risks just like they do, he is convinced to give Antonio back his morpher and let him join the next attack by Steeleto. With all six Rangers working as a team, Steeleto is defeated by a tag-team attack from Jayden and Antonio. Ji acknowledges that he was wrong to dismiss Antonio so quickly, with the team officially accepting him as the sixth ranger. Note: This episode aired in France on April 30, 2011, before the United States broadcast.
15	15	"The Blue and the Gold"	Akihiro Noguchi	David Schneider and Jill Donnellan	May 14, 2011
Ji tasks Antonio with putting his tech skills to use in fixing the Claw Zord, a zord that was damaged in battle many years ago. Kevin has concerns around Antonio's unconventional methods and perceived lack of respect for the Samurai traditions. The monster of the day steals kids' toys to create sorrow with Octoroo, trying to find another way to open the Sanzu River through a well. Bulk and Spike are sleeping, and their toy panda is stolen, and all that is left is slime. Dayu visits Deker outside the Sanzu River, but around it, he's still injured. Dayu wonders if Deker remembers anything from his past. Antonio follows Kevin's morning routine to learn what makes him a true samurai. The boys end up in the forest, finding Octoroo, but their morpher signals are blocked. Kevin and Antonio eventually overcome their differences and fight together to defeat the Nighloks. Note: This episode aired in France on May 4, 2011, before the United States broadcast.
16	16	"Team Spirit"	Jonathan Brough	Billy Rueben and James W. Bates	May 21, 2011
As the Rangers are preparing to throw a surprise birthday party for Emily, the Nighlok Splitface attacks the city and steals several people's souls, including Emily's. The Rangers learn that they only have twenty-four hours to defeat Splitface before his victims' souls are stolen forever. Splitface intends to wait the time out in the Netherworld, as only Nighloks are capable of travelling there. Deker soon appears and reveals to the Rangers that they could enter the Netherworld if they willingly became human-Nighlok hybrids like himself, although he confesses he does not remember how it happened to him. The Rangers are hesitant but grow to consider it, with Mike in particular believing that anything would be worth it to save Emily's life. Before they can make the decision, however, Antonio arrives and tells the Rangers that during their encounter with Splitface, he marked the Nighlok with the same symbol that he has been using to fix the Claw Zord, meaning that once the zord is fixed, Splitface will be drawn out of the Netherworld like a magnet. The other Rangers help Antonio finish fixing the Claw Zord with their symbol power, and after successfully summoning Splitface, the Rangers defeat him and free the souls just in time. The next day is Emily's birthday, and the surprise party goes ahead as planned.
17	17	"The Tengen Gate"	Jonathan Brough	David McDermott	May 28, 2011
The Rangers start a battle in their Zords against giant moogers. Later, the Rangers talk about how the Nighlok are getting much stronger, causing Ji to mention the existence of the Black Box, a legendary weapon made by the first Red Samurai Ranger that was said to grant great power to the Rangers. However, the first Red Ranger never finished the Black Box, and no one in the following generations has ever managed to complete it. It is decided that Antonio should attempt to finish it due to his technological skills. Jayden takes the Rangers to the Tengen Gate, the site of the first ever Nighlok attack, where the Black Box is stored. The gate's guardian, Daisuke, tells the Rangers a folk tale about a woman who made a deal with a Nighlok king to save the life of her husband, only for the king to trick them by turning them both into Nighloks. While Xandred is incapacitated regenerating in the Sanzu River, a Nighlok named Arachnitor tries to overthrow him and tries to force the sealing symbol from Jayden. Octoroo, because of Arachnitor, poisons Jayden as the Rangers sit for tea, trying to get the special sealing symbol from him. While Jayden is poisoned, the other Rangers face off against Arachnitor, but are doing poorly without their leader. While the Rangers struggle, Deker kidnaps Jayden, planning on purging the poison in him in a nearby river so that they can finally duel. Before Arachnitor can finish the Rangers off, Xandred drags him back to the Sanzu River for trying to overthrow him. After all the Nighloks disappear, Antonio is left wondering what to do, with Jayden missing and his friends unconscious.
18	18	"Boxed In"	Jonathan Brough	Seth Walther	June 4, 2011
Deker uses the nearby river to purge the poison from Jayden so that he can recover enough to duel Deker. While Antonio tries to work on the Black Box, the other Rangers recover, leave their ranger discs for Antonio to access the Black Box, and end up fighting a mutated Arachnitor. At the Shiba House, Antonio tries to work on the Black Box. Still, before fully unlocking it, Antonio figures out where Jayden is and decides to help him, as he does not have enough energy to finish unlocking the Black Box yet. Antonio then convinces Deker not to duel Jayden until he is back to full strength. Jayden and Antonio join the other Rangers to fend off Arachnitor, who flees before being defeated, leaving the Rangers to fend off giant Moogers instead, which the rangers destroy with the Battlewing Megazord and the Claw Zord.
19	19	"Broken Dreams"	Akihiro Noguchi	Jill Donnellan	October 1, 2011
Furious with Dayu for not following his orders to destroy Deker, Master Xandred sets fire to her beloved harmonium. Devastated, Dayu escapes into the human world to fix it. Meanwhile, the Rangers face the Nighlok Rhinosnorus, who has the power to trap people in extremely vivid and happy dreams before devouring them in their sleep. After Antonio is put to sleep, Jayden strains his symbol power to open a portal to Rhinosnorus' dream world, allowing Kevin and Mike to enter, but severely exhausts himself in the process, preventing himself from tagging along. Elsewhere, Mia ends up in a solo fight with Dayu, until Rhinosnorus arrives and sends them both to sleep. Mia enters Dayu's dream and learns about her past - her and Deker were the two humans mentioned in Daisuke's story. They were both ordinary humans who had just gotten married, but on their wedding night, their house caught fire. They escaped, but Deker was left with critical injuries. After desperately calling for help, a Nighlok appeared to Dayu and offered to save Deker's life in exchange for Dayu trading her humanity to become a Nighlok. Dayu agreed, and Deker's life was saved, but as a cursed human-Nighlok hybrid, with no memory of Dayu or his past life. Mia feels sympathy for Dayu after learning this, and offers Dayu a chance to redeem herself, which is refused. Kevin and Mike free Antonio from the dream world, and Rhinosnorus flees. Octoroo sends giant Moogers into the city, taking advantage of Jayden's exhaustion. After Antonio and Jayden defeat the Moogers, Deker returns to challenge Jayden to a duel once more.
20	20	"The Ultimate Duel"	Akihiro Noguchi	Jonathan Rosenthal	October 8, 2011
Continuing from the end of the last episode, Deker demands that Jayden duel him. Jayden refuses, telling Deker he only fights to protect the innocent as opposed to fighting for the sake of it. Tired of waiting, Deker gives Jayden an ultimatum that the duel must take place in twenty-four hours, and if Jayden fails to appear then Deker will stop trying to hold back his Nighlok side and attack any civilians around. Jayden agrees, but Kevin and the other Rangers try to talk Jayden out of fighting Deker alone. Kevin asks why they're letting a Nighlok dictate the terms of the battle, and proposes that the Rangers simply take on Deker as a team like normal. Jayden refuses and tells them he must be the one to duel Deker, or Deker will never give up. Just as Jayden prepares to leave the next day, Rhinosnorus attacks once more, and Jayden puts Kevin in charge of leading the team while he fights Deker. The Rangers defeat Rhinosnorus while Jayden battles Deker. The battle rages on, with both combatants evenly matched. Eventually, Jayden allows Deker to injure him to get close enough to finish Deker off. Deker's sword, Uramasa, is broken, and half of it gets stuck in the ground nearby. Deker thanks Jayden for the duel, claiming that Jayden's victory has freed him from his curse, before he falls off a cliff and vanishes in a puff of smoke. Back at the Shiba House, Jayden thanks Kevin for leading the team in his absence as they all celebrate their victory.
21	HS	"Party Monsters"	Akihiro Noguchi	James W. Bates and Amit Bhaumik	October 29, 2011
In the Nighlok afterlife, the defeated Nighlok Monsters hold a Halloween party and recap their battles with the Rangers to each other, which Master Xandred views from his mirror. All the Nighloks told their versions of how the Rangers took them down. After the stories, the Nighloks vow never to bring up the Rangers at their next Halloween party. At the end of the episode, Master Xandred is displeased at not being invited to the afterlife party, stating, "I would have been the life of the party." Octoroo states to Master Xandred that the party was meant for those "in the obituary."
22	MS	"Clash of the Red Rangers: The Movie"	Jonathan Tzachor	James W. Bates	November 26, 2011
In another dimension of Earth, the RPM Red Ranger Scott uses the Skyrev Megazord to fight Venjix's general Professor Cog in the deserts outside of Corinth. Cog tricks Scott into lowering his guard and then escapes the battle. In a subway within the Samurai Rangers dimension, Professor Cog and his Grinders enter the scene. In the city, the Rangers battle Sharkjaw and the Gold Ranger joins the fight, but fail to defeat the Nighlok. Professor Cog is surprised to learn that Rangers exist in this dimension but dismisses them as mere pests. Sharkjaw retreats after drying up, and Octoroo tells him he is no longer needed as General Gut and his army of Moogers are waiting to attack in the human world. Professor Cog enters the Netherworld to meet Master Xandred. Professor Cog wants to use some of the Sanzu River to poison the humans in his dimension in return for the destruction of the Samurai Rangers. Master Xandred agrees to the plan. Back in the subway, the RPM Red Ranger makes his appearance. The Rangers are celebrating their victory with ice cream when they run into a swarm of Grinders. Their swords prove ineffective against the Grinders until Scott, who has followed Professor Cog to the Samurai dimension, joins the battle and destroys all the Grinders. The Rangers bring him to the Shiba House so that he can explain his story. Scott refuses to demorph out of fears he would be unable to breathe, as he is more accustomed to the atmosphere of a protective biosphere from his dimension. Later, the Grinders make their attack on Antonio, who morphs and fights the Grinders. The Gap Sensor alerts the Rangers to battle. Scott gets there early by taking Mentor Ji’s bike and helps out Antonio while the Rangers and Professor Cog enter the fray. Cog uses his hypno-bolts on Jayden and Scott (which will slowly cause them to distrust each other), and before using his portal attack to take the other Rangers into his dimension. At the docks, Cog blasts the Red Rangers into the water and leaves. Jayden tries to help Scott, who gives him the cold shoulder. Jayden is worried about his friends, but Scott tells him that the Rangers will help them. Back at the Sanzu River, the Grinders start collecting the Sanzu River. At the Shiba House, Jayden and RPM Red Ranger meet up with Mentor Ji, who pinpoints Cog, Sergeant Tread, and General Gut. Jayden morphs into action and summons a horse while Scott takes the bike again. Both Rangers race to the scene. Scott is bitter that Jayden beat him to the scene, and the two Rangers battle each other as Cog watches. After a brief fight, the Rangers both appear unscathed, much to Professor Cog’s confusion. Mentor Ji had noticed the effect of the hypno-bolts and reversed the poison with symbol power. The Rangers were staging the fight to fool Professor Cog. The Red Rangers work together to fight the villains, powering up to Shark Attack (Scott) and Super Modes (Jayden). During the fight, the other Samurai Rangers return to join the fight (courtesy of Dr K and the RPM Rangers) and defeat Professor Cog and Sergeant Tread. They then turn their attention to the Mooger army. The Rangers summon the warhorses and head towards the Mooger army while the Gold Ranger and RPM Red Ranger use a car. The Rangers work together to trim down the army's size. Jayden faces off against General Gut, who knocks him to the ground. As General Gut is about to finish him off, Jayden uses the Shark Disc to defeat the swarm of Moogers, and together the Rangers defeat General Gut, who grows into his Mega mode form. After a brief battle, General Gut reveals his true form, which includes a Serpent monster attached to his body. The Rangers form the Samurai Shark Megazord to finally defeat him. Antonio and Scott watch from afar until Scott asks Antonio to help him fix his damaged car. Back at the Sanzu River, Master Xandred is furious with the failure as Octoroo tries to calm him down. Back at the subway, Scott says goodbye to his new friends and returns to his own dimension, but not before wishing Mike good luck with Emily. Notes: 1. This television movie has an extended airing time of an hour (with commercials) and was aired out of chronological order. Antonio Garcia is portrayed by Jeremy Birchall (voice only) during this episode, as Steven Skyler is absent during filming.: 2. In some countries outside the United States, this television movie is sometimes aired split into two parts due to the extended airing time.; 3. This television movie takes place during Power Rangers Super Samurai despite being aired as part of Power Rangers Samurai.
23	CS	"Christmas Together, Friends Forever"	Jonathan Brough	Jill Donnellan and Amit Bhaumik	December 10, 2011
While reflecting on their first year together, the Rangers learn the meaning of Christmas. Emily reflects on the year through a letter to her sister Serena by writing about their adventures and fun times. Meanwhile, Bulk tries to make his first Christmas with Spike memorable and recap their moments of comical relief, also their near encounters with the Rangers. The next morning, on Christmas Day, everyone opens their presents except Mike. Feeling left out, Mentor tells him to go to the front door where Mike finds a green motocross bike. As he returns home, he tells the others that he gave the bike to these two guys who have nothing and are grateful for what he has the others. It turns out that Bulk and Spike are the guys that Mike gave the bike to, and they are last seen riding it chasing Santa in the night sky, wishing everyone happy holidays.

=== Season 2: Power Rangers Super Samurai (2012) ===
No. overall	No. in season	Title	Directed by	Written by	Original release date
24	1	"Super Samurai"	Jonathan Brough	James W. Bates	February 18, 2012
The Rangers become concerned by the extent of the Sanzu River when its water begins to seep into our world – meanwhile, Arachnitor resurfaces and uses the River's water to prevent himself from drying out. At the Shiba House, Antonio works on the Black Box – after he completes it, he rushes to where the other Rangers are fighting Arachnitor and finally arrives, informing Jayden that he has succeeded in unlocking the Black Box. Jayden uses the Box to access Super Samurai Mode and defeat Arachnitor. Once Arachnitor assumes Mega Monster form, they use a new Black Box-powered Megazord combination of Samurai Megazord and Claw Battlezord: Claw Armor Megazord to do battle with the summoned giant Moogers, and then a new cannon: the Samurai Battle Cannon, formed by the Beetle, Swordfish, Tiger and Octozords to destroy Arachnitor. In a subplot, Bulk and Spike attempt to record the Rangers battling the Nighloks on film to learn some of their moves. But in a comical twist, they forget the SD card for the camera.
25	2	"Shell Game"	Jonathan Brough	Seth Walther	February 25, 2012
The Rangers must defeat Armadevil, a hard-shelled Nighlok who proves to be a formidable opponent. Meanwhile, Antonio loses his Samurai Morpher without knowing, and the two wannabe Samurais (Bulk and Spike) find it themselves. The Rangers combine their attacks in a certain order to weaken Armordevil's shell and Kevin uses the Black Box to finish him. In Mega Monster form, Armadevil's shell is fully restored and proves difficult to break. The Rangers then repeat their first method of defeating Armadevil, but it still is ineffective. The Samurais call the Samurai Megazord and Claw Zord for the Claw Armor Megazord, then the Samurai Battle Cannon, and finally finish the battle once and for all. Afterward, the wannabe Samurais put the Morpher in the exact spot they found it. Emily and Mike show up moments later, relieved at Antonio's safety, and return his Morpher from the ground. Antonio wonders what he missed all day.
26	3	"Trading Places"	Jonathan Brough	David McDermott	March 3, 2012
A Nighlok named Switchbeast visits Master Xandred's ship, offering his services in dealing with the Rangers. Switchbeast is not one of Xandred's minions, claiming that he works for a different Nighlok master who sent him to Xandred to seek an alliance. Xandred is suspicious but lets Switchbeast prove himself. Switchbeast has the power to trap the spirits of humans into inanimate objects, and uses this to trap the spirits of Jayden, Mia, Kevin, and Antonio inside a fan (Mia), a (ballerina) music box (Kevin), a gnome (Jayden) and a cooked fish (Antonio) respectively. Switchbeast also attacks a public market and switches civilians's spirits into the items they were selling, including trapping Bulk and Spike in a soda can and a newspaper. Mike deduces that if an object is destroyed while a spirit is trapped inside it, the person will be destroyed too. This is Switchbeast's plan, as he explains to Xandred that as humans don't like having massive piles of junk lying around, they will clean the objects up and recycle them, destroying human lives without even knowing it. Emily and Mike manage to turn Switchbeast's power on himself, causing the Nighlok to swap bodies with Mike. With Mike now being in Switchbeast's body and possessing his power, he traps Switchbeast inside a football briefly to intimidate him into revealing how to put everyone back in their bodies. Switchbeast is forced to agree, and the Rangers' lives are saved, but Antonio faints as the neighborhood cat was seconds away from eating him while he was trapped inside the fish. Mike goes Super Samurai and destroys Switchbeast, but with the Nighlok supersized, the Rangers must summon the power of the Claw Armor Megazord. The Rangers win and celebrate with their friends by having a barbecue. Meanwhile, Master Xandred is angered at this defeat and throws a Furry Wart out a gap – this Wart meets Dayu on a river stream as she plans to find a way to end Master Xandred's life by casting her out and breaking her harmonium.
27	4	"Something Fishy"	Akihiro 'Yuji' Noguchi	Eugene Son	March 10, 2012
After switching bodies with a fish and almost getting eaten by a cat, Antonio is now afraid of fish. Meanwhile, in the Netherworld, the Nighlok Serrator (who was Switchbeast's employer) allies with Master Xandred. Back at the Shiba House, the team tries to help Antonio out with aversion therapy: Jayden is afraid of spiders, Mike is claustrophobic and Mia is afraid of frogs – after that attempt fails, the Gap Sensor goes off and the Rangers rush into action. Antonio stays behind and Mentor Ji shows him the LightZord, an ancient Zord that no Ranger has been able to master – he asks Antonio to see if he can unlock it. The Rangers deal with two Spitfangs before Serrator destroys them himself and personally tests the Rangers' fighting skills. He effortlessly defeats the Rangers in battle. At the last second, Antonio arrives with the Lightzord to drive Serrator off before he enlarges Lightzord to take out the Papyrox. Later on, the Rangers ask Antonio how he got over his fear – he tells them in response and they start to laugh as it is shown that Mentor Ji had snuck up behind Antonio and stuffed sushi in his mouth, having him eat it. Bulk and Spike attempt to rescue the stray kitten from the top of a tree in a subplot but end up getting stuck there themselves.
28	5	"The Rescue"	Akihiro 'Yuji' Noguchi	Samuel P. McLean	March 17, 2012
At the Shiba House, with Antonio having conquered his fear of fish, Emily and Mike decide to keep the stray kitten as a pet. The Rangers are surprised to see Antonio and Mentor Ji working collaboratively to store the Shark Disk (capable of defeating General Gut) with the Light Zord. Mike plays a prank on a distracted Antonio by putting dry cat food in his plate of trail mix but is caught by Mentor Ji who gives Mike a taste of his own medicine before deciding to continue working on the Disk outdoors, free of distractions. Meanwhile, at the Sanzu River, Octoroo announces the return of the powerful Nighlok Eyescar to Master Xandred who has a plan to trap the Rangers. Upon completing the Shark Disk, Antonio and Mentor Ji are kidnapped by a swarm of Moogers. With the Gap Sensor sounding, the Rangers head to investigate their disappearance. While following the trail left by Antonio's dropped reel, the Rangers are ambushed by many Moogers. Mike figures out something within the Light Zord and unleashes it, which turns out to be the Shark Disk. This allows Jayden to access Shark Attack Mode to destroy the set of Moogers effortlessly. Eyescar eagerly awaits the Rangers' arrival with his massive Mooger army, outnumbering the Rangers a hundred to one. Still, Jayden, having to anticipate the situation, enters the fray with the Samurai Battlewing destroying most Moogers with an aerial assault. The Rangers then move in and rescue Ji and Antonio before defeating Eyescar together. When Eyescar returns to life as a Mega Monster, the Rangers use the Shark Sword to finish him off. Back at the Shiba House, Antonio and Mentor Ji thank the rest of the team for their help and Mike attempts to try the same prank again on Antonio, only to be caught a second time by Mentor Ji. In a subplot, Bulk and Spike try to create signature symbols for each other.
29	6	"The Bullzord"	Akihiro 'Yuji' Noguchi	Marc Handler	March 24, 2012
Young boy Cody comes to the Shiba House with a Power Disk and orders The Rangers to break the seal on the Bullzord, the original Samurai Zord, which was sealed by the Grand Shogun 300 years ago after it ravaged the countryside. (The location of the Zord is a secret which Cody's family has guarded). The Rangers return Cody home to his father, who insists that as per the Grand Shogun's orders, the Bullzord is uncontrollable and must stay sealed for eternity. When neither his father nor Jayden helps him, Cody escapes his house and breaks the seal himself, unleashing the Bullzord which runs amok as feared. Meanwhile, Serrator sends Crustor to capture the Bullzord to use it in an unknown plot. Fearing for his son's safety, Cody's father gives Jayden the original Bull Disk as Cody had owned a fake. As the Rangers battle Crustor, Jayden manages to get Cody the Bull Disk, which tames the wild Zord, uncovering a secret message from the Grand Shogun and unlocking the powerful Shogun Mode. Jayden then has the Bullzord's Megazord form, Bull Megazord, face off against Crustor's Mega Monster form and uses the power of Shogun Mode to successfully bring this battle to a close.
30	7	"He Ain't Heavy Metal; He's My Brother"	Nobuhiro Suzumura & Akihiro 'Yuji' Noguchi	Kevin Rubio & David McDermott	March 31, 2012
Mia's younger brother Terry Watanabe comes to town and tries to convince Mia to sing in his band as part of his performance at a children's hospital. Mia is reluctant to help Terry as her parents want Terry to get into med school. Meanwhile, Serrator begins his next attack on Earth, which overwhelms the others until Mia shows up, and she drives him away to bring his plan to fruition. At the same time, Bulk and Spike try to form their musical act. Mia and Antonio sing at the concert together.
31	8	"Kevin's Choice"	Peter Salmon	Jonathan Rosenthal	April 7, 2012
The Rangers discuss the possibility of forming a legendary Megazord combination known as the Samurai Gigazord, which combines every single zord into one. Most of the team are hesitant, as the Gigazord combination has the potential to destroy all of the zords if done incorrectly, but Antonio and Mia agree that Kevin could pull it off due to his history creating successful Megazord combinations. However, Kevin soon loses his Samuraizer in an attack by the Nighlok Skarf, causing him to be unable to morph. Unable to assist the team, he travels to a swimming center where a meet of his old swim team is being held – there, he reunites with one of his old team members, who asks Kevin why he quit the team so abruptly. Kevin, unable to tell the truth due to the need to keep his identity as the Blue Ranger a secret, considers returning to swimming and abandoning the Ranger life as his Samuraizer is still missing. Mike calls Kevin's Samuraizer to track down Skarf, discovering the Samuraizer is in the Nighlok's arm. Elsewhere, it is revealed that Deker survived his duel with Jayden, as his sword took the damage for him. Upon reuniting with Dayu, Serrator recruits the pair to work for him, promising to fix Dayu's harmonium and Deker's sword. While the Rangers fight Skarf, Dayu and Deker arrive on the scene, only to attack Skarf instead of the Rangers, end the fight prematurely by destroying Skarf, giving the Rangers the chance to retrieve Kevin's Samuraizer. Kevin, who has decided to remain with the team, returns to action. It turns out Dayu and Deker destroyed Skarf because his second life is far more powerful than the first. To defeat Skarf, Kevin helps the team form the Samurai Gigazord for the first time. Later, Kevin goes to the swim meet to see his old friend win after using Kevin's advice. This episode was featured in the 2013 Colors of Courage Marathon.
32	9	"Runaway Spike"	Peter Salmon	Jill Donnellan	April 14, 2012
Bulk tries training Spike to be a Samurai until the mail arrives and they find out that the rent is overdue. Meanwhile, the Rangers battle Duplicator, who overwhelms the Rangers with his clones until he is forced to retreat. Spike gets fired from all three jobs that he tried, and Mia talks to him, and he reveals to her that he wants to be a samurai, so she tells him never to give up. Back at the Shiba House, the Rangers talk about the Nighlok, and Mia comes back, and she also tells them never to give up. They figure out that the LightZord can help them, which they use to defeat Duplicator when the LightZord finds the shadow of the real Duplicator. After Duplicator comes back as a mega monster, Mia uses the Shogun Disk to access Shogun mode, and she fires the battle cannon to finish him off. Bulk and Spike end up getting a job catching fish for Antonio.
33	10	"The Strange Case of the Munchies"	Akihiro Noguchi	Jill Donnellan	April 21, 2012
At the Shiba House, Kevin watches as Emily and Mike train. Kevin tells Emily that she needs to be tougher. Mia tells Emily about a sale at the mall where she buys an outfit that makes her look tough. Mia accidentally drops her wallet at the mall, and it is found by Bulk and Spike, who attempt to return it. At the Sanzu River, Serrator sends the Nighlok Grinataur into the human world. Grinataur has the power to inflict humans with insatiable hunger and thirst, causing them to be driven to madness with the need to constantly eat and drink whatever is nearby. Grinataur manages to place all of the Rangers barring Emily under the spell, and Emily feels guilty as they were hit trying to protect her. Ji tries to help the Rangers with their hunger and thirst to no avail, as they quickly go through all the food in the Shiba House. Bulk and Spike discover the Shiba House's location from Mia's driver's license and ask Mentor Ji if they can train there. Mentor Ji puts Emily in charge of training Bulk and Spike to be Samurai. Emily pretends to be an overly strict drill sergeant in order to scare them off, which helps her realise that she can be tough when the situation calls for it. In the end, Emily destroys Grinataur on her own, lifting the curse.
34	11	"A Sticky Situation"	Peter Salmon	Seth Walther	April 28, 2012
During training, Jayden mentions to Kevin and Mike that they would both be twice as strong if they were to work together. The Gap Sensor then sounds, and the Rangers encounter the Nighlok Epoxar. During the fight, Kevin and Mike get their hands glued together by Epoxar before Antonio shows up and drives him off. After a few attempts to cut the glue off, the Rangers realize that defeating Epoxar is the only way to separate Kevin and Mike. Though the boys attempt to prove that they can fight in light of the literal sticky situation, they are told to stay behind. While Kevin and Mike eventually get along, the others train to deflect Epoxar's glue until the Nighlok returns to glue every person he comes across to something or each other. Following the others, Kevin and Mike watch their teammates fall into Epoxar's trap. Kevin and Mike resolve their disagreements after Mike admits that Kevin is the superior warrior and Kevin admits that Mike is more creative with his strategies. The pair hatch a plan and work in sync to defeat the Nighlok. Back at the Shiba House, Kevin and Mike show everyone what an excellent team they make by sorting the groceries out together, until they accidentally end up dropping the eggs.
35	12	"Trust Me"	Akihiro 'Yuji' Noguchi	Marc Handler	May 5, 2012
After learning of possible Nighlok activity on an island called Monalua, the Rangers travel to investigate. Upon arriving, they split up into three groups. Emily and Kevin encounter a young boy who tells them of ash, seemingly coming from a nearby volcano, is causing the villagers to become extremely paranoid. Meanwhile, Master Xandred, Octoroo, and the Nighlok Malden test out their new Master Blaster inventions to be used on the Rangers. After warning the others via their Samuraizers, they attempt to regroup to form a plan but are ambushed by Dayu. Elsewhere, Serrator ambushes Mike and Antonio and taunts them over the fact that they're still using swords. Deker attacks Jayden and Mia, noting that he believes Jayden has become weaker since their duel due to the fact he relies on his teammates far more often. This distracts Jayden and allows Deker to injure him until Mia takes him out of the battle and into safety. Meanwhile, at the Sanzu River, the Nighlok Maldan demonstrates his newly developed laser blaster weapon to Master Xandred, with Maldan's Mooger Squad using the weapon for target practice. Still enraged by Deker’s words, Jayden runs off to fight Deker, again, with Mia in tow. They arrive at a mountain guarded by Dayu and Deker that is producing the ash infecting the village. Mia fights Dayu as Pink Ranger, as the other Rangers arrive. Just then, Maldan appears with his Mooger Blaster Squad. The Rangers use their speed to get close enough to the Moogers to take them out until Antonio gets gunned down by the Mooger’s reinforcements, who overwhelm the rest of the team. At the last second, Mentor Ji arrives with the Bullzooka (a gift from Cody), and utilizing the Bullzooka, Jayden destroys Maldan and his mooger squad. When Maldan revives, the others hold him off while Jayden destroys the ash source and thus breaking Serrator's hold on the island. Serrator then takes Dayu and Deker away, leaving a Papyrox and a pair of Spitfangs to keep the Rangers at bay. Then the Rangers form Claw Armor Megazord to destroy the spitfangs and eventually needing to use Samurai Gigazord to destroy the Papyrox. Having freed the island, the Rangers head back home.
36	13	"The Master Returns"	Akihiro 'Yuji' Noguchi	Samuel P. McLean	May 12, 2012
Jayden has doubts about his ability to be the Red Ranger, and he ends up taking his anger out on the team during training. While this occurs, Master Xandred has Octoroo demand Dayu's harmonium from Serrator. Serrator takes Octoroo to where he hid the instrument and then attacks him. Serrator reveals that he has no intention of handing the harmonium over and that he has been deceiving Xandred and his crew the whole time in order to eventually usurp Xandred from his position. Octoroo is defeated but survives and retreats to inform Xandred of Serrator's betrayal and causes the Gap Sensor to detect his movement. Dayu makes her way to Serrator's location just as the Rangers arrive to fight him, with the Rangers initially outmached until Dayu and Serrator begin fighting each other instead of them. Using the harmonium as a shield, Serrator overpowers Dayu until the screams of an enraged Xandred drown everything out. Xandred enters the human world to destroy Serrator, despite Octoroo's warning about the seal placed on him by Jayden's father. Thanks to the seal, Xandred begins drying out the moment he leaves the Netherworld. Serrator flees, leaving the Rangers to fight Xandred, who effortlessly defeats them all despite becoming rapidly dehydrated and weakened. Xandred agrees to forgive Dayu for her betrayal and fix her harmonium in exchange for returning to the ship and pledging loyalty to him, which she does. The nearly dried out Xandred is dragged back into the Netherworld by Octoroo, who sends a barrage of giant Moogers to finish off the Rangers. Jayden is left unconscious from his encounter with Xandred, leaving the other Rangers led by Kevin to defeat the Moogers. As the severely wounded Jayden is taken back to the Shiba House, Xandred is dropped into the depths of the Sanzu River to regain his strength. Octoroo notes that he stayed in the human world far too long and therefore it could take a very long time for the Sanzu River to restore him. With Xandred out of action, Serrator effortlessly takes over as leader of the Nighloks, declaring to Octoroo that no one is left to stand in the way of his grand plan.
37	14	"A Crack in the World"	Nobuhiro Suzumura & Akihiro 'Yuji' Noguchi	Seth Walther	October 13, 2012
Kevin notices that the places that Serrator’s Nighloks attacked prior all form a straight line. On Master Xandred’s Ship, Serrator summons the Nighlok Pestilox to attack at the appropriate locator point. Antonio catches a large fish at the docks and takes photos of it at a nearby photo booth. Back at the Sanzu River, Octoroo confronts Serrator after discovering his 200-year plan. Octoroo learns that Serrator was wedging sadness in a pattern. Serrator is impressed reveals that Deker is an important tool in his plan. In the forest, Dayu informs Deker that she doubts Serrator will keep his word, but Deker merely tells Dayu to stay away from Serrator. Pestilox begins his assault, and Mentor Ji calls Antonio to battle. Pestilox fires insects into the mouths of the citizens, causing them great stomach pain. Bulk and Spike decide to take a break from their training to eat, and they notice the injured citizens and the Nighlok. Pestilox turns his attention to Bulk and Spike. The Nighlok fires the insects towards them, but they hide in the Photo Booth. Suddenly Spike feels the same pain, but it is merely an empty stomach. Bulk and Spike move the photo booth towards the food. Several photos are taking during their journey and lunch. Pestilox enjoys his victory until the Gold Ranger makes his appearance. The Gold Ranger attacks Pestilox while the other Rangers and Moogers join the fight. Pestilox fires the insects towards them. Green Ranger blocks the attack with the Forest Spear. Red Ranger fires the 5-Disc Cannon, but Serrator blocks the attack. Super Samurai Red Ranger and Rangers Pink and Yellow work together against Pestilox while the others fight Serrator. Deker arrives at the scene with his Temporary Sword aimed at Serrator's back. Serrator tells Deker how the recent Nighlok fights have created the opening for his ultimate plan: To flood the entire Sanzu River into the human world and thereby allow him to become the ruler of both worlds. Super Samurai Red Ranger fires the Super Bullzooka and defeats Pestilox, who grows to his Mega Mode form. The Rangers form the Samurai Megazord to face off against Pestilox. Serrator details how Deker's role as a half-human, half Nighlok is important to the mission. Pestilox is defeated when the Rangers form the Claw Armor Megazord and Jayden powers up to Shogun Mode. Dayu overhears the conversation with Deker and Serrator. Deker, who wants Uramasa back, is uninterested in Serrator’s plan, but Serrator tells Deker that his curse will be lifted by fulfilling the sword's true purpose. Serrator's plan starts as energy blasts emit from the ground at the wedge points. Serrator floats in the air and admires his near victory. Deker falls to the ground. Jayden tries to stand up but is too weak to do so. This episode was first broadcast on Nickelodeon (Latin America) on August 23, 2012, and on Nickelodeon (Netherlands) on September 23, 2012.
38	15	"Stroke of Fate"	Nobuhiro Suzumura & Akihiro 'Yuji' Noguchi	Amit Bhaumik	November 3, 2012
In the city, the Rangers slowly awaken from the recent attack. Antonio stands up to find the Barracuda Blade and the injured Deker. Antonio prepares to finish off Deker to prevent him from taking part in Serrator's plan. He controls the urge and leaves the scene. At the Shiba House, as the Rangers discuss the recent events to formulate a plan, Antonio apologizes for not taking the opportunity to defeat Deker, despite his friends telling him that he was noble for not attacking Deker when he was unable to defend himself. In the forest, Dayu follows Deker, who remembers Serrator's words as he stumbles upon their old home's remains. The Gap Sensor sounds, and Jayden orders the Rangers to split up to find Antonio and deal with the Gap issue. Serrator enjoys his recent victory and awaits Deker to take his place. Deker walks down the road until he runs into Antonio, who tries to reason with him, but Deker attacks him. Mike and Kevin arrive in time to protect Antonio. Chasing after Deker as he regains Uramasa from Serrator, the regrouped Rangers cannot stop him with Serrator in their way. But at the last second, Deker strikes down Serrator instead of the final marker. Deker reveals that he only cares for his sword and doesn't share Serrator's hatred for humanity, as he remembers it was Serrator who tricked Dayu and cursed Deker all those years ago. Deker flees and tells the Rangers to finish off Serrator. The Rangers morph into action and destroy Serrator with the 5 Disc Octo Cannon and Super Bullzooka. Serrator grows to his Mega Mode and battles the Bull Megazord and LightZord while the Samurai Megazord and Claw Battlezord destroy the Papyrax Serrator summoned. The Rangers form the Samurai Gigazord to finish off Serrator, only for the Symbol Powered Shogun Strike not to affect him. On Gold Ranger’s suggestion, Shogun Red summons the Shark Zord and combines it with Gigazord into a true final combination called Samurai Shark Gigazord to finally destroy Serrator the Shark Sword Slash. In the forest, Dayu confronts Deker about his decision. Deker responds that he will end his curse on his terms. As the sun sets, the Rangers celebrate their victory. Bulk and Spike attempt to block one of the energy beams in the ground with a giant ball of chewing gum in a subplot. This episode was originally scheduled to air on October 20, 2012, but was pushed back for the TMNT Premiere. This episode was first broadcast on Nickelodeon (Latin America) on August 24, 2012, and on Nickelodeon (Netherlands) on September 30, 2012.
39	16	"Fight Fire With Fire"	Akihiro 'Yuji' Noguchi	Marc Handler	November 10, 2012
Mia watches as Jayden trains alone. She notices a monk delivering a message with the Shiba Crest. Mentor Ji gives the message to Jayden, who carefully reads the document. Jayden is worried that his friends will finally learn his secret. Meanwhile, on Master Xandred’s Ship, Octoroo is glad to see Dayu returning as he tells her Xandred is still recovering in the Sanzu River. Octoroo summons the Nighlok Fiera to ambush the Red Ranger. He gives her an artifact filled with evil flames from the Sanzu River and was designed to take down the Shiba clan leader. When she attacks, Jayden is protected by the others against his wishes. The pain from Fiera’s attacks begins to take its toll on Jayden. With the other Rangers down, Jayden uses the Black Box to finish the fight, barely surviving as he destroys Fiera with the Super Bullzooka. Dayu wonders why the fire didn't consume the Shiba Clan head, while Octoroo has an idea on why it didn't work. Fiera grows to Mega Mode, and Jayden gives Kevin the Black Box. Super Samurai Blue Ranger summons the Claw Armor Megazord. Fiera is too quick for the Claw Armor Megazord. Jayden remains injured on the ground as he sees a blurry vision of a girl walking towards him who reveals a Shiba Morpher. Fiera continues to fire against the Zords. The Lion Folding Zord attacks Fiera on its own as the others realize that Jayden is not piloting it. After Fiera is destroyed, the Rangers help Jayden see another Red Ranger who powers down to reveal her true form. Jayden introduces the Rangers to his big sister Lauren, and she is pleased to see her younger brother. Returning to the Shiba House, Mentor Ji tells the story of the Great Battle, how the previous Rangers fought against Master Xandred, and how Jayden's father put his faith in his two children. Lauren was sent into hiding to master the Sealing Symbol while Jayden was chosen to take her place temporarily. This means that Jayden was never the true Red Ranger, and was merely filling in for Lauren. Ji explains that to prevent the Nighloks from learning of Lauren's existence, Jayden had to keep the truth a secret from everyone, even the other Rangers. Lauren has now mastered the sealing symbol. Lauren takes care of Jayden’s injuries, but he plans to leave the team, as he believes the Sealing Power is their only hope to defeat Master Xandred and that there can only be one Red Ranger. Antonio cooks a victory meal for the Rangers, and they welcome Lauren to the team. Jayden walks out of the Shiba House after giving the Power Discs to Lauren and tells the Rangers that she is the Power Rangers' new leader. The Rangers are deeply upset by his decision. Antonio asks Lauren to tell Jayden that they need him, but she remains quiet. Mike questions why Jayden has to leave, but Mentor Ji responds that he can't be stopped, so Jayden says goodbye to his friends. Kevin wants to join Jayden, who immediately declines. The Rangers watch as he leaves the Shiba House. Later that night, the Rangers miss Jayden and question his departure. Antonio decides to go after Jayden, considering himself not a "true samurai." Lauren remains quiet, as she knows she knows that she can never take Jayden's place. This episode was first broadcast on Nickelodeon (Latin America) on August 27, 2012, and on Nickelodeon (Netherlands) on October 7, 2012.
40	17	"The Great Duel"	Akihiro 'Yuji' Noguchi	Jill Donnellan	November 17, 2012
At the docks, Jayden ponders about his departure. Antonio arrives to comfort Jayden, who responds that Antonio must protect Lauren, the new Red Ranger. Antonio leaves for a moment and returns to find Jayden gone. Jayden walks alone in the forest and questions his true destiny. He runs into Deker, who challenges him to a rematch of their ultimate duel, stating that they have something in common: they are both warriors tormented by fates that they didn't choose. Jayden accepts the duel. At the Shiba House, Mentor Ji tells the Rangers that they should train with Lauren while searching for Jayden. At the Sanzu River, Octoroo prepares his latest Nighlok: Gigertox, stating this may be their last chance. Dayu is surprised that Octoroo gave half of his life source to Gigertox. Back at the Shiba House, Mia serves lunch, and the Rangers try to get to know Lauren. To the shock of the Rangers, Lauren loves Mia's cooking. Back in the forest, Mentor Ji watches as Jayden faces off against Deker, and in an attempt to protect Jayden, they both fall down a cliff and land near a stream. Gigertox begins the attack, and Antonio fights him alone until the others arrive. Antonio struggles against the powerful Nighlok, and he is defeated. Lauren and the other Rangers arrive at the scene to join the fight, with Antonio warning them that Gigertox is stronger than any Nighlok they've fought before. At the stream, Mentor Ji reminds Jayden of his childhood and his dedication to the Samurai life and tries to convince him not to fight Deker but to no avail. Unable to change his mind, Mentor Ji leaves Jayden alone after telling him he can do it. The Rangers finally manage to destroy Gigertox, who grows into his Mega mode form. After defeating him a second time, he returns with a third life thanks to Octoroo’s sacrifice. They manage to destroy him with a Symbol Powered Mega Strike. Back at the Shiba House, the Rangers look after Antonio and Mentor Ji, who tells them about Jayden’s duel against Deker. Jayden and Deker’s duel reaches its climax. This episode was first broadcast on Nickelodeon (Latin America) on August 28, 2012, and on Nickelodeon (Netherlands) on October 14, 2012.
41	18	"Evil Reborn"	Akihiro 'Yuji' Noguchi	Seth Walther	November 24, 2012
Mike, Mia, and Emily leave to find Jayden, while Kevin and Lauren stay behind if there's a Nighlok attack. Antonio is told to stay behind as he needs to rest. The epic duel between Jayden and Deker reaches its climax. Sensing his concerns for his friend, Lauren tries to convince Kevin to help the others find Jayden while mentioning how she never had a friend. Kevin reminds her that she does now. At the Sanzu River, Octoroo believes that Master Xandred is returning while Dayu senses that Deker is in trouble. By nightfall, a badly injured Jayden manages to deliver what seems to be a mortal blow to Deker. Lauren finally convinces Kevin to find Jayden for her. Mike, Mia, and Emily find Jayden and Deker both on the brink of collapse surrounded by a ring of fire. Deker stands up, still alive, wanting to continue the fight, but is unable to lift his sword. The others beg them to stop fighting and are surprised to see Deker talking to himself. Dayu manifests in spirit to talk to Deker in her human form, causing Deker to remember his past with Dayu. Deker asks Dayu's spirit to leave him alone while Jayden takes the opportunity to walk away. Deker charges towards a defenseless Jayden but is saved when Kevin shows up and strikes Deker down. The Rangers help Jayden out of the fire while Deker slowly disintegrates, happy that his curse is finally broken. At the Sanzu River, Dayu senses Deker's demise, causing her to abandon her remaining attachment to humanity. Back in the forest, Jayden thanks his friends for coming to his aid and apologizes for not telling them about Lauren and his secret. As Jayden is about to leave, his friends try to stop him. The Rangers try to convince Jayden that he has and always will be their true leader even if he doesn't have the sealing symbol. While looking away, Jayden reminds them it was all a lie. Mike calls Jayden's bluff and tells him that if he really thinks none of it was real, he should say it to their faces, which he is unable to do. Giant Moogers begin to attack the city. Lauren asks Antonio for help while Mentor Ji calls the Rangers. Kevin invites Jayden to the fight, who relents and says he will return. The Rangers morph into action and head to the city. Dayu, finally accepting her Nighlok side, begins to play her harmonium in the hope that her misery over Deker's fate will raise the Sanzu River. Dayu ends up getting into a fight with Mia, who slices Dayu’s harmonium in half. Mia believes she has defeated Dayu, but Dayu merely laughs as she reveals that the harmonium contained all of her sadness that has built up over her centuries spent as a Nighlok. As the harmonium is irreparably destroyed, a giant black tornado-shaped cloud flows from it, darkening the surrounding area. The sheer amount of misery released all at once causes the Sanzu River to surge, finally reviving Master Xandred. This episode was first broadcast on Nickelodeon (Latin America) on August 29, 2012, and on Nickelodeon (Netherlands) on October 21, 2012.
42	19	"The Sealing Symbol"	Nobuhiro Suzumura & Akihiro 'Yuji' Noguchi	Seth Walther	December 1, 2012
With Master Xandred fully healed, he returns to Earth and thanks Dayu for reviving him. Dayu tells Xandred that she did not do it for him but for Deker, and expresses that she no longer has the will to live. Xandred absorbs Dayu's essence into him, destroying her and allowing her to be with Deker once more. Lauren gathers the other Rangers and asks them to keep Xandred busy while she prepares to finally use the sealing symbol, as it takes a long time to write. The Rangers eventually fall to Xandred, but succeed in buying Lauren enough time to perform the symbol. When the symbol is used on Xandred, it launches him into a cliff and the resulting explosion lead the Rangers to believe they've won, only for Xandred to emerge from the flames, brandishing a new white patch on his chest. It is revealed that, as the sealing symbol is only effective on pure Nighloks, Xandred's absorption of Dayu granted him immunity. With the Rangers reeling from their defeat, Xandred severely injures Lauren, causing Jayden to arrive on the scene and teleport the team to safety. Back at the Shiba House, Lauren returns the status of Red Ranger and leadership of the team to Jayden. Jayden theorises that as Xandred's white patch contains Dayu's human side, it may have created a weak spot. Lauren, too injured to fight alongside the team anymore, provides Jayden with a new "Shiba Fire" power disk, which she has packed with a large amount of her symbol power. The next day, Xandred finally launches the Nighlok invasion of Earth, with the city being flooded with Sanzu River water. The Rangers mobilise and fight off Xandred's army of Moogers, with Jayden eventually making his way through them all and striking Xandred in his weak spot while his sword is charged with the Shiba Fire disk. Jayden's attack deals substantial damage to Xandred but fails to destroy him, and the resulting counter-attack causes the Shiba Fire disk to be destroyed and for all six Rangers to be knocked to the ground in a weakened state. Xandred asks if they will beg for mercy, and when they refuse, he leaves the Rangers behind, telling them that he will capture Lauren and see if they're willing to surrender then. This episode was first broadcast on Nickelodeon (Latin America) on August 30, 2012, and on Nickelodeon (Netherlands) on October 28, 2012.
43	20	"Samurai Forever"	Nobuhiro Suzumura & Akihiro 'Yuji' Noguchi	David McDermott	December 8, 2012
While the Rangers attempt to fight off the remaining Moogers in their weakened state, Lauren sacrifices the rest of her symbol power to create a second Shiba Fire disk, which she gives to Mentor Ji to deliver to the team. Ji meets up with the Rangers and helps them eliminate the Moogers before giving Jayden the new Shiba Fire disk alongside a white "Double" disk that has the ability to duplicate a Ranger's weapon. Ji explains that Jayden's father gave him the Double disk before his last battle and instructed him to save it until Xandred returned, and warns Jayden that Lauren's new Shiba Fire disk can only be used once. Armed with their new disks, the Rangers chase after Xandred, who is on his way to the Shiba House to capture Lauren. Xandred and the Rangers battle once more, with Mia, Emily, Mike, and Antonio combining their symbol power to place a temporary "capture" symbol on Xandred. While he is captured, Jayden uses his father's disk to attack Xandred with two Fire Smashers, severely weakening him and providing an opening for Kevin to strike him with the Shiba Fire disk. Due to the disk containing all of Lauren's remaining symbol power, it releases enough fire energy to allow Jayden to access Shogun Mode outside of the Megazord for the first time, which he uses to destroy Xandred's first life. During the Megazord battle, Xandred overpowers the Rangers, and Jayden concludes that all six Rangers need to demorph and funnel all the symbol power they have into a single attack. This plan is successful, and the Rangers finally destroy Xandred. With Xandred's demise, the Sanzu River naturally recedes back into the Netherworld, with Octoroo as the sole survivor left on Xandred's ship as the gap between Earth and the Netherworld closes forever. With the Nighlok no longer a threat to the world, the Rangers disband and discuss what they'll be doing with their lives moving forward - Antonio sets off on an around-the-world fishing expedition, Mia enrols in a culinary academy, Kevin plans to rejoin his swim team in the hope of qualifying for the Olympics, and Mike starts dating Emily with the two moving into Emily's sister's house. Ji resolves that his next mision will be teaching Jayden how to have fun, buying him a guitar as a victory gift. Jayden plays the Power Rangers theme song as a riff as the episode fades out. Jason Narvy reprises his role as Eugene Skullovitch. This episode was available on DVD before its television debut. This episode was first broadcast on Nickelodeon (Latin America) on August 31, 2012, and on Nickelodeon (Netherlands) on November 4, 2012.
44	HS	"Trickster Treat"	Jonathan Tzachor	Michael Sorich	October 27, 2012
Master Xandred is upset about Halloween. Octoroo has a plan that involves Trickster, a Nighlok that traps the Rangers in bad dreams. The first dream the Rangers experience is a fight with Moogers in a forest. The Rangers, dressed in animal costumes, arrive at the scene and defeat the Moogers. Kevin is the leader of the Rangers in this dream instead of Jayden, which causes him to behave far more arrogantly. The other Rangers pick up on Kevin's altered personality, and then come to realise that none of them remember dressing up for Halloween in the first place. As they deduce they are in a dream, Trickster quickly transports them to another one to throw them off. The Rangers are now at a concert where Mia (who is instead played by Rin Takanashi, who played Mia's counterpart Mako in Shinkenger) is performing and the other Rangers are her backup dancers. After questioning the situation once again, Trickster ejects the Rangers into a third dream, where they are de-morphed in the middle of a quarry where they fight against a seemingly endless army of Moogers. Trickster is manipulating the dream behind the scenes, constantly rewinding and looping parts, leading to the Rangers unknowingly fighting the same Mooger over and over again. Eventually, the Rangers work it out again, and out of frustration, Trickster enters the dream himself to directly fight them. The Rangers morph (with each Ranger having their full morphing sequence played individually, making this the longest morph in the history of Power Rangers) and take on Trickster and the Moogers. The Rangers appear to easily defeat Trickster, causing him to grow to his mega mode, however during the Megazord fight Trickster repeatedly grows larger and larger until even the Megazord is tiny compared to him. While Trickster taunts the Rangers, Jayden spots a rotating fan in the distance that emits a whirring noise. The Rangers realise that the noise has been playing in each of their dreams, and destroy it under the assumption that the fan is how he has been controlling their dreams. After the fan is destroyed, the Rangers and Trickster (who is back to normal size) find themselves in the city, and the Rangers each individually use their special attacks to defeat Trickster and cause him to go into mega mode again. Trickster reveals that the fan was a red herring and that the Rangers are still trapped in a dream - the real Trickster never actually left the Netherworld and has been watching his dream self fight the Rangers in a cinema setting. Jayden, who has already worked this out, identifies the angle that the real Trickster is watching from and aims the Megazord attack there. This causes the blast to ripple through the cinema screen, destroying Trickster for real and freeing the Rangers in time for Halloween. This episode uses no original footage. All scenes are either directly taken from Shinkenger or recycled from other episodes of Samurai, with the actors merely supplying new dialogue that was dubbed in over existing footage. Alongside this, despite the fact the episode was produced alongside the rest of Samurai and released worldwide on October 27 2012, between the airings of "The Master Returns" and "A Crack In The World", it did not premiere in the United Kingdom until November 3 2013, at which point Samurai had ended and Power Rangers Megaforce was wrapping up its first season. The reasons for this are unknown.
45	CS	"Stuck on Christmas"	Jonathan Brough	Jill Donnellan	December 15, 2012
After battling a Nighlok named Gred late on Christmas Eve, the Rangers' Megazord malfunctions, trapping them inside. While Kevin works to fix it, the Rangers reminisce on their journey so far to pass the time. Meanwhile, Bulk and Spike visit the Shiba House to drop off a present for Mia, and Ji invites them in to tell their own stories about their encounters with the Rangers. Once Kevin fixes the Megazord, Ji surprises Bulk and Spike by having the Rangers turn up to thank them for their help against the Nighloks. Despite this episode being set between "Stroke of Fate" and "Fight Fire With Fire", Antonio is completely absent outside of flashback footage for unknown reasons.

== Reception ==
By 2012, Power Rangers had an average of 2 million viewers. The highest rated episode was the May 15, 2011 broadcast of "The Blue and the Gold", with 3.7 million viewers.

== Comic book ==
Papercutz produced two issues of a comic book based on Power Rangers Super Samurai.

The Samurai Rangers also played a role in the 2018 Comic Book Event "Shattered Grid", celebrating 25 years of the Power Rangers franchise.

== Awards and nominations ==
Year	Award	Category	Nominee	Result
2012	2012 Kids' Choice Awards	Favorite TV Actor	Alex Heartman	Nominated

== Home media ==
The complete season of Super Samurai was released on Blu-ray on December 4, 2012 and DVD on January 7, 2014 by Lionsgate Home Entertainment.
