= Ricardo Medina Jr. =

American actor (born 1979)

- Born: January 24, 1979 (age 47); Kern County, California, U.S.
- Occupation: Actor
- Years active: 2002–2012
- Known for: Power Rangers Wild Force; Power Rangers Samurai
- Criminal charge: Voluntary manslaughter
- Criminal penalty: 6 years in prison (paroled after 4 years)
- Criminal status: Released

Ricardo Medina Jr. (often referred to as Rick Medina, born January 24, 1979) is an American former actor. He is best known for his role as Cole Evans, the Red Wild Force Ranger on the TV series Power Rangers Wild Force, and later as Deker, the half-human cursed Nighlok in Power Rangers Samurai.

== Early life ==
Ricardo Medina Jr. was born in Kern County, California, and raised in Downey, California. He is of Puerto Rican descent.

== Filmography ==
Year	Title	Role	Notes
2002	Power Rangers Wild Force	Cole Evans / Red Wild Force Ranger	40 episodes
2003	ER	Aidan Fenwick	Episode: "No Good Deed Goes Unpunished"
2004	CSI: Miami	Lance	Episode: "Money for Nothing"
2005	Kept	Contestant (Eliminated 5th)	
2005	Confessions of a Pit Fighter	David Castillo	
2007	Witchcraft	Jack Bell / Drion	
2008	Parasomnia	Officer	
2011–2012	Power Rangers Samurai / Power Rangers Super Samurai	Deker	24 episodes
2012	Bad Blood	Mark	

== Killing of Joshua Sutter and conviction ==
On February 1, 2015, Medina was arrested after he stabbed to death his 38-year-old roommate, Joshua Sutter, on January 31. Sutter had been stabbed in the abdomen with a medieval "Conan the Barbarian" sword at a home in Green Valley, west of Palmdale, California. Medina called emergency services, and Sutter was pronounced dead upon arrival at a hospital. Medina was initially held on $1,000,000 bail, but no charges were filed against him from the district attorney due to requests on further investigation so he was released on February 3, 2015. Medina claimed that he stabbed Sutter in self-defense after Sutter forced open the door of Medina's bedroom, into which Medina and his girlfriend had retreated after an argument between Medina and Sutter. Medina had lived in the home in Green Valley for approximately two months.

On January 14, 2016, he was arrested again on murder charges in connection with Sutter's death. At that time, Medina faced a possible sentence of life imprisonment with a chance of parole after 26 years with prosecutors planning to ask that Medina be held on $1,000,000 bail. On March 16, 2017, Medina pled guilty to one felony count of voluntary manslaughter. On March 30, 2017, Medina was sentenced to the maximum 6 years in prison. As of 2020, Medina Jr. has been released from prison as revealed in an interview with Wild Force co-star Jack Guzman.
