= Joe Daymond =

New Zealand actor and comedian (born 1995)

Joseph Daymond
- Born: Wainuiomata, New Zealand
- Known for: Actor; comedian; writer; producer

Joseph Daymond is a New Zealand actor, comedian, writer and producer.

== Early life ==
Joseph Daymond was born in Wainuiomata, a large dormitory suburb of Lower Hutt, in the Wellington metropolitan area in New Zealand. He is of Fijian and Māori descent. He spent his early childhood in Malaysia and India before moving back to New Zealand in 2005.

== Career ==
=== Comedy ===
Daymond started his career in comedy in 2017. In 2020, he become the youngest comedian to sell out Auckland's SkyCity Theatre when he sold out two shows at the age of 24.

In 2023, Daymond performed alongside Theo Von at The Comedy Store in Los Angeles, California. That same year, he joined Noel Miller on his international comedy tour Everything is F#&ked for its US West Coast leg, and made his Australian television debut when he made an appearance at Just for Laughs Australia airing on Network 10 where he performed at Sydney Opera House.

=== Television ===
In 2017, Daymond created a TV production company West Park. The company, in partnership with Whakaata Māori, launched Rags Are Riches, a series about finding affordable alternatives to high fashion.

In 2021, Daymond was invited to participate in Celebrity Treasure Island That same year he co-wrote and starred in SIS for Comedy Central, and made his debut on TVNZ's Have You Been Paying Attention and Three's 7 Days.

In 2022, Daymond filmed Get the Name Right for Three, a series about finding the origin of different place names in New Zealand.

In 2023, Daymond created the mockumentary series Bouncers, his second for Comedy Central. The series featured an appearance from UFC fighter Israel Adesanya.

Daymond has appeared in TV series including My Favorite Dead Person, The Eggplant, Guy Montgomery's Guy Mont-Spelling Bee, and Sextortion. He was also part of the writing team in The Eggplant, 7 Days and SIS.

== Recognition ==
In 2018, Daymond was nominated for Best Newcomer and Best Breakthrough at the New Zealand Comedy Guild Awards.

In 2023, Daymond was nominated for Television Personality of the Year at the 2023 New Zealand Television Awards.
