= Paul Williams (comedian) =

New Zealand comedian, writer and musician

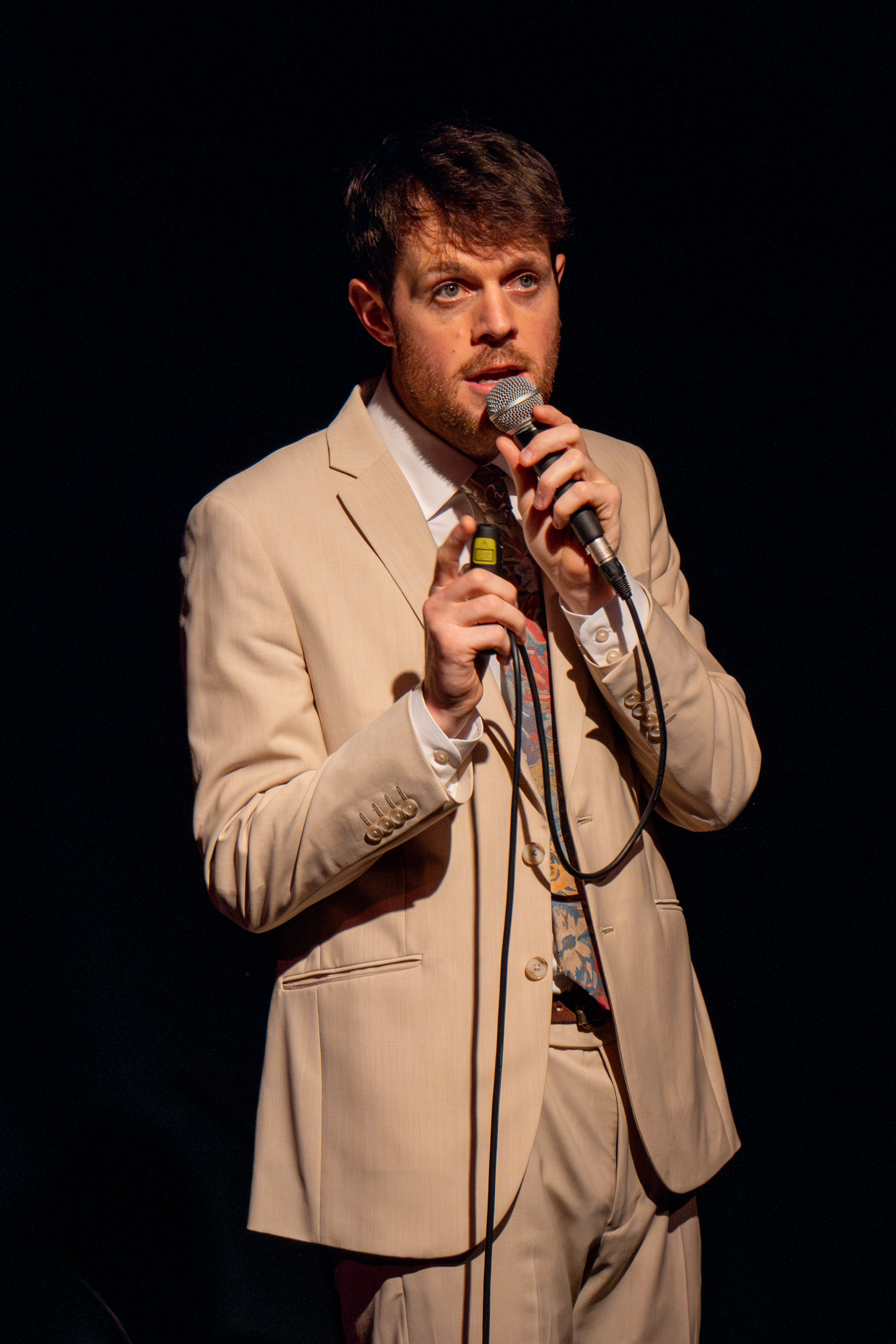
- Williams at the 2024 Edinburgh Festival Fringe
- Born: Nelson, New Zealand
- Education: Nelson College
- Spouse: Simone Nathan (m. 2024)
- Father: Gary Williams
- Relatives: Guy Williams (brother)

Paul Anthony Allan Jones Williams is a New Zealand comedian, writer, and musician. Williams plays the role of Taskmaster's assistant on the New Zealand version of the international television series Taskmaster, and is one of the show's principal writers. He was nominated for the 2017 Billy T Award for up-and-coming New Zealand comedians for his stand-up comedy.

== Early life and education ==
Paul Anthony Allan Jones Williams grew up in Nelson, New Zealand, with his parents Gary and Roseanne Williams. He is the youngest of three children, with a sister, Maria, and brother, Guy, both of whom are also comedians.

He was educated at Nelson College. He performed leading roles in musical theatre with the Nelson Youth Theatre Company, and published comedy raps with music videos on YouTube.

Williams studied musical theatre at Whitireia Performance Centre in Wellington, and at the end of 2013 moved to Auckland.

== Career ==
=== Comedy ===
Williams' comedy show “Summertime Love”, presented as a mock dating seminar, went on tour through New Zealand and to the Edinburgh Festival Fringe and Melbourne International Comedy Festival. He was nominated for the Billy T. Award for the country's best newcomer in 2017. Since 2017, he has co-hosted the basketball-themed Advanced Analytics NBA Podcast with his brother Guy.

=== TV ===
Williams is a presenter of Taskmaster NZ as the Taskmaster's Assistant (with Jeremy Wells as the Taskmaster) and one of the three writers of the tasks and script for the show. He was reviewed as the programme's "most valuable player", with praise for his "underplayed comedy" in the role. His brother Guy, who is also a comedian, was a contestant on the first season. Paul appeared as a guest on episodes 48 (Oatmeal and death), 137 (Shaqinahat), and 164 of Taskmaster The Podcast with Ed Gamble as the host.

He stars in the TVNZ comedy series Kid Sister along with Our Flag Means Death writer Simone Nathan, who is also his wife.

In 2023, Williams appeared on the panel show Guy Montgomery's Guy Mont-Spelling Bee and came in second place after Dai Henwood.

He created, wrote on and executive produced the comedy spy series New Zealand Spy, which premiered on TVNZ 2 on 29 April 2026.

=== Music ===
As a musician, Williams released some early albums of comedy and parody, before moving on to writing and performing original songs. In a 2014 radio interview with The Edge, New Zealand singer Lorde said that Williams was her favourite performer.

Williams has released several albums of his own songs, including the EPs Songs about Girls (2014) and Jungle River Adventure (2015). His full-length album Surf Music (2018) was described as "an excellent, earnest piece of pop music that feels individual and unique [...] funny because Williams is funny, not because it needs to be". "Euroleague", the 7th track on the album, was featured as soundtrack for James Acaster's stand up tour and comedy special Cold Lasagne Hate Myself 1999. He performed songs from his second album, Summers in Salzburg, at a performance advertised as an album launch, in 2024, though as of June 2026 the album has not been released to the public.

== Personal life ==
Williams married his girlfriend of six years (and co-star in Kid Sister) Simone Nathan in a Jewish ceremony in Sydney in late 2023, several weeks after getting engaged in Europe. They held a second, legally binding ceremony in front of family and friends in the Bay of Islands in March 2024.

Like his character in Kid Sister, Williams converted to Orthodox Judaism in 2023.

== Filmography ==
=== Television ===
Year	Title	Role	Notes	Ref
2020–	Taskmaster NZ	Presenter / Taskmaster's assistant	TV series; also writer	
2022–2024	Kid Sister	Ollie (main role)	TV series	
2023	Guy Montgomery's Guy Mont-Spelling Bee	Self	TV series	
2023	Our Flag Means Death	Bluecoat #1	TV series	
2026	New Zealand Spy	Michael Riviera	TV series; main cast (6 episodes); creator; writer and executive producer	
