= Guy, Sharyn & Clint =

New Zealand entertainment trio and brand

- Current owner: MediaWorks New Zealand
- Country: New Zealand
- Introduced: January 2014
- Discontinued: December 2016

Guy, Sharyn & Clint was a MediaWorks New Zealand brand, composed of personalities Guy Williams, Sharyn Casey and Clint Roberts. The trio hosted The Edge drive show The Edge Afternoons with Guy, Sharyn & Clint, Saturday show The Edge Fat 40 with Guy, Sharyn & Clint, and Four television programme The Xtra Factor, a follow-up programme of the second New Zealand series of The X Factor. The brand was discontinued at the end of 2016, when Guy Williams and Clint Roberts left The Edge. Their former drive slot was filled by The Edge Afternoons with Jono, Ben & Sharyn.

== Personalities ==
=== Guy Williams ===
Guy Williams is a New Zealand comedian and radio and television personality. His only previous work at The Edge was in December 2013, when he co-hosted the breakfast show with Sharyn Casey (and later, Clint Roberts) to fill in for Jay-Jay, Mike & Dom. He also co-hosts Three satirical show Jono and Ben and narrated Come Dine with Me New Zealand.

=== Sharyn Casey ===
Sharyn Casey is a radio and television personality. After working in retail since dropping out of high school the age of 15, she started working in radio in 2004. She has worked for The Edge since 2006, when she won the "Quit Your Day Job" promotion. Previously, she has co-hosted other radio shows on The Edge, as well as television shows Four Live on Four, the New Zealand version of Dancing with the Stars on Three, and The Music Lab on The Edge TV.

=== Clint Roberts ===
Clint Roberts
- Born: Clinton Paul Roberts; 1 February 1987 (age 39); Rotorua, New Zealand
- Spouse: Lucy Slight
- Children: 2
- Presenting career
- Show: Bree & Clint
- Station: ZM
- Network: New Zealand Media and Entertainment
- Country: New Zealand

Clinton Paul "Clint" Roberts (born 1 February 1987 in Rotorua, New Zealand) is a New Zealand radio host. He currently cohosts ZM's drive show, Bree & Clint, with Bree Tomasel. He worked at The Edge from 2006 through 2016, and at George FM from 2017 through March 2018.

==== Early life ====
Roberts grew up in Rotorua. He attended the New Zealand Broadcasting School in Christchurch, but dropped out before completing his degree to take a job at The Edge.

==== Career ====
Roberts started working at The Edge in 2006. His roles have included cohosting shows and being the assistant programme director. After filling in on the breakfast show at the end of 2013 with Guy Williams and Sharyn Casey, they started hosting The Edge Afternoons with Guy, Sharyn & Clint and The Edge Fat 40 with Guy, Sharyn & Clint from 2014. In 2015, he hosted Hot Right Now on The Edge TV and cohosted The Xtra Factor with Williams and Casey. He began cohosting the breakfast show on George FM in 2017 with Kara Rickard and Pax Assadi; he then cohosted with Rickard and Tammy Davis, until he left in March 2018. In July 2018, he began cohosting Bree & Clint with Bree Tomasel.

He has been MC for, among others, music festivals The Future Music Festival and Rhythm & Vines.

==== Personal life ====
Roberts married magazine editor Lucy Slight in March 2018. They have two daughters, Tui Grace Aroha Roberts, born on 11 July 2019, and Maggie, born 27 March 2021. They also have two British Shorthair cats, Ziggy and Bowie (after singer David Bowie).

== The Edge Afternoons with Guy, Sharyn & Clint ==
The Edge Afternoons with Guy, Sharyn & Clint
- Genre: Comedy
- Running time: 4 hours
- Language: English
- Home station: The Edge
- Hosted by: Guy Williams; Sharyn Casey; Clint Roberts
- Produced by: Chang Hung (Jan 2014 – Mar 2016); Oscar Jackson (Mar–Dec 2016)
- Website: www.theedge.co.nz/home/shows/guy--sharyn---clint.html
- Podcast

The Edge Afternoons with Guy, Sharyn & Clint was broadcast on The Edge from 3 pm through 7 pm on weekdays. Debuting on 20 January 2014, it was formed after the hosts of The Edge's previous afternoon show, Carl Fletcher and Vaughan Smith, quit to work at rival station ZM's breakfast show Fletch, Vaughan & Megan. The last show was broadcast on 23 December 2016. It was replaced in 2017 by The Edge Afternoons with Jono, Ben & Sharyn, hosted by Sharyn Casey and Jono and Ben's Jono Pryor and Ben Boyce.

Chang Hung produced the show from its inception until March 2016, when he was replaced by Oscar Jackson. Jackson continued to produce the show until its ending in December 2016. Hourly news headlines were read live by Megan Mansell, host of The Edge Workday of Awesome and Takeaways, from the show's inception until March 2016, when she was replaced by pre-recorded headlines read by Newshub's Glen.

The radio show was rated the top radio drive show in New Zealand by a 2014 market survey and received approximately 227,300 listeners every week as of 2014. It was The Edge's most successful drive show.

As well as being broadcast on The Edge's FM frequencies throughout New Zealand, the show was streamed live via the internet on The Edge's website and its Android and iOS apps. The show, without the music, news or advertisements, is published as a podcast.

== The Edge Fat 40 with Guy, Sharyn & Clint ==
The Edge Fat 40 with Guy, Sharyn & Clint
- Running time: 3 hours
- Language: English
- Home station: The Edge
- Hosted by: Guy Williams; Sharyn Casey; Clint Roberts
- Website: www.theedge.co.nz/Music/Fat40.aspx

The Edge Fat 40 with Guy, Sharyn & Clint was broadcast on The Edge from 2 pm through 5 pm on Saturdays. It featured a countdown of the 40 biggest songs, as calculated by a mixture of online music rating website musiclab.net.nz and votes for that week's Smash! 20.

Unlike their weekday show, The Edge Fat 40 is not available as a podcast, as voice breaks were mostly filled with discussion about just played or upcoming songs, or current promotions.
