= The Masked Singer NZ =

New Zealand reality singing competition television series

- Genre: Reality competition
- Based on: King of Mask Singer by Munhwa Broadcasting Corporation
- Presented by: Clinton Randell
- Starring: Rhys Darby; Sharyn Casey; Ladi6; James Roque; Anika Moa
- Country of origin: New Zealand
- Original language: English
- No. of seasons: 2
- No. of episodes: 22

Production
- Running time: 41–85 minutes

Original release
- Network: Three
- Release: 9 May 2021 – 2 October 2022

The Masked Singer NZ is a New Zealand reality singing competition television show based on the Masked Singer franchise which originated from the South Korean version of the show King of Mask Singer. It premiered on Three on 9 May 2021. The show is hosted by Clinton Randell, with the current judging panel comprising James Roque, Sharyn Casey, and Anika Moa.

== Season overview ==
Series overview
| Season | Contestants | Episodes | Originally released | | Winner | Runner-up | Third place |
| Season | Contestants | Episodes | First released | Last released | Winner | Runner-up | Third place |
|---|---|---|---|---|---|---|---|
| 1 | 12 | 11 | May 9, 2021 | June 13, 2021 | Jason Kerrison as "Tuatara" | Troy Kingi as "Sheep" | Joe Cotton as "Medusa" |
| 2 | 12 | 11 | July 24, 2022 | October 2, 2022 | Hollie Smith as "Bedazzled Unicorn" | Drew Ne'emia as "Gladiator Alligator" | Ria Hall as "Blue Penguin" |

== Season 1 ==
| Contestant | Identity | Occupation(s) | Episodes | | | | | | | | | |
| Contestant | Identity | Occupation(s) | 1 | 2 | 3 | 4 | 5 | 6 | 7 | 8 | 9 | 11 |
|---|---|---|---|---|---|---|---|---|---|---|---|---|
| Tuatara | Jason Kerrison | Singer | WIN | | SAFE | | SAFE | | RISK | SAFE | SAFE | WINNER |
| Sheep | Troy Kingi | Singer | | WIN | | SAFE | | RISK | SAFE | SAFE | SAFE | RUNNER-UP |
| Medusa | Joe Cotton | Singer | WIN | | SAFE | | RISK | | SAFE | RISK | RISK | THIRD |
| Pavlova | Stephanie Tauevihi | Singer | | WIN | | SAFE | SAFE | | SAFE | SAFE | OUT | |
| Monster | Kings | Rapper | | WIN | | RISK | | SAFE | SAFE | OUT | | |
| Jellyfish | Matilda Green | Author | WIN | | SAFE | | | SAFE | OUT | | | |
| Possum | Grace Palmer | Actress | RISK | | RISK | | | OUT | | | | |
| Orange Roughy | Mike McRoberts | Journalist | | RISK | | SAFE | OUT | | | | | |
| Monarch | Madeleine Sami | Actress | | RISK | | OUT | | | | | | |
| Alien | Tom Sainsbury | Comedian | RISK | | OUT | | | | | | | |
| Moa | Stephen Donald | Rugby player | | OUT | | | | | | | | |
| Tui | Suzy Cato | TV presenter | OUT | | | | | | | | | |

The masked singer won their face-off and remained in the competition.
The masked singer lost their face-off and was in the bottom three, but was not eliminated.
The masked singer was safe from elimination.
The masked singer was eliminated from the competition and unmasked upon their elimination.
The masked singer did not perform.
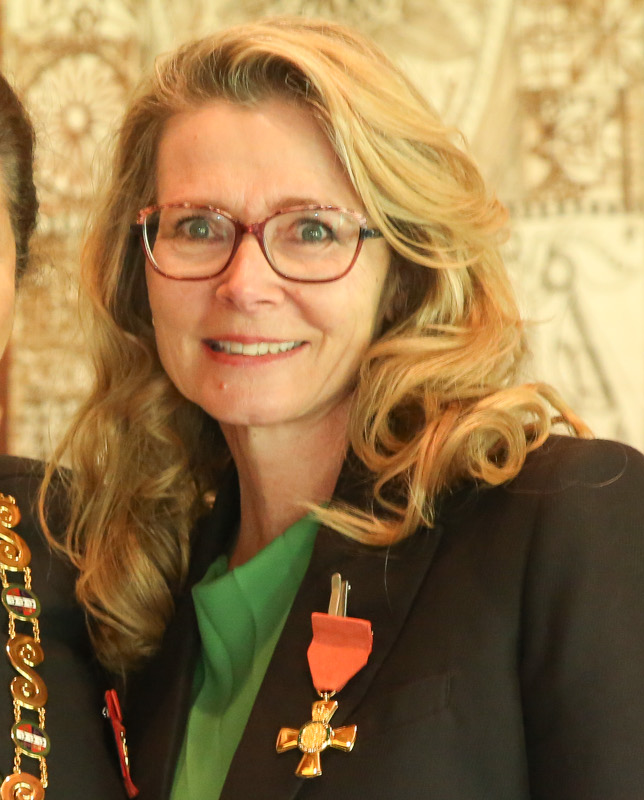
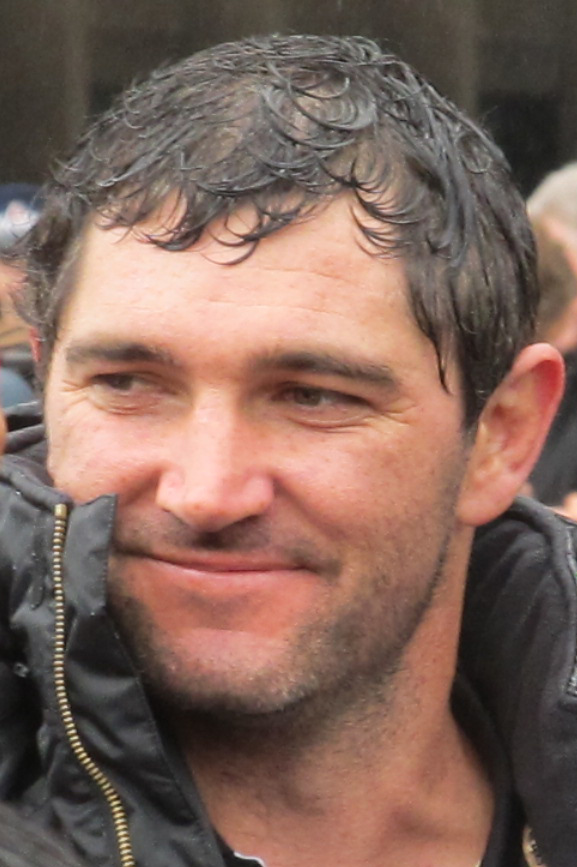
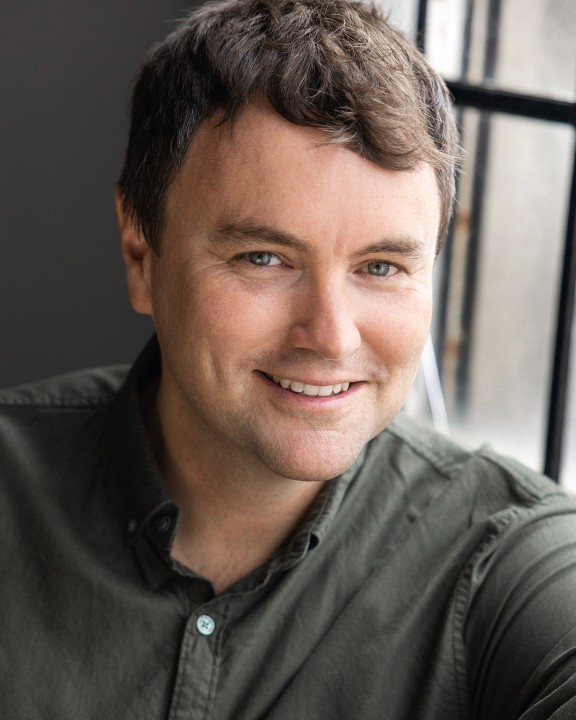
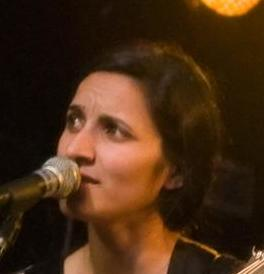
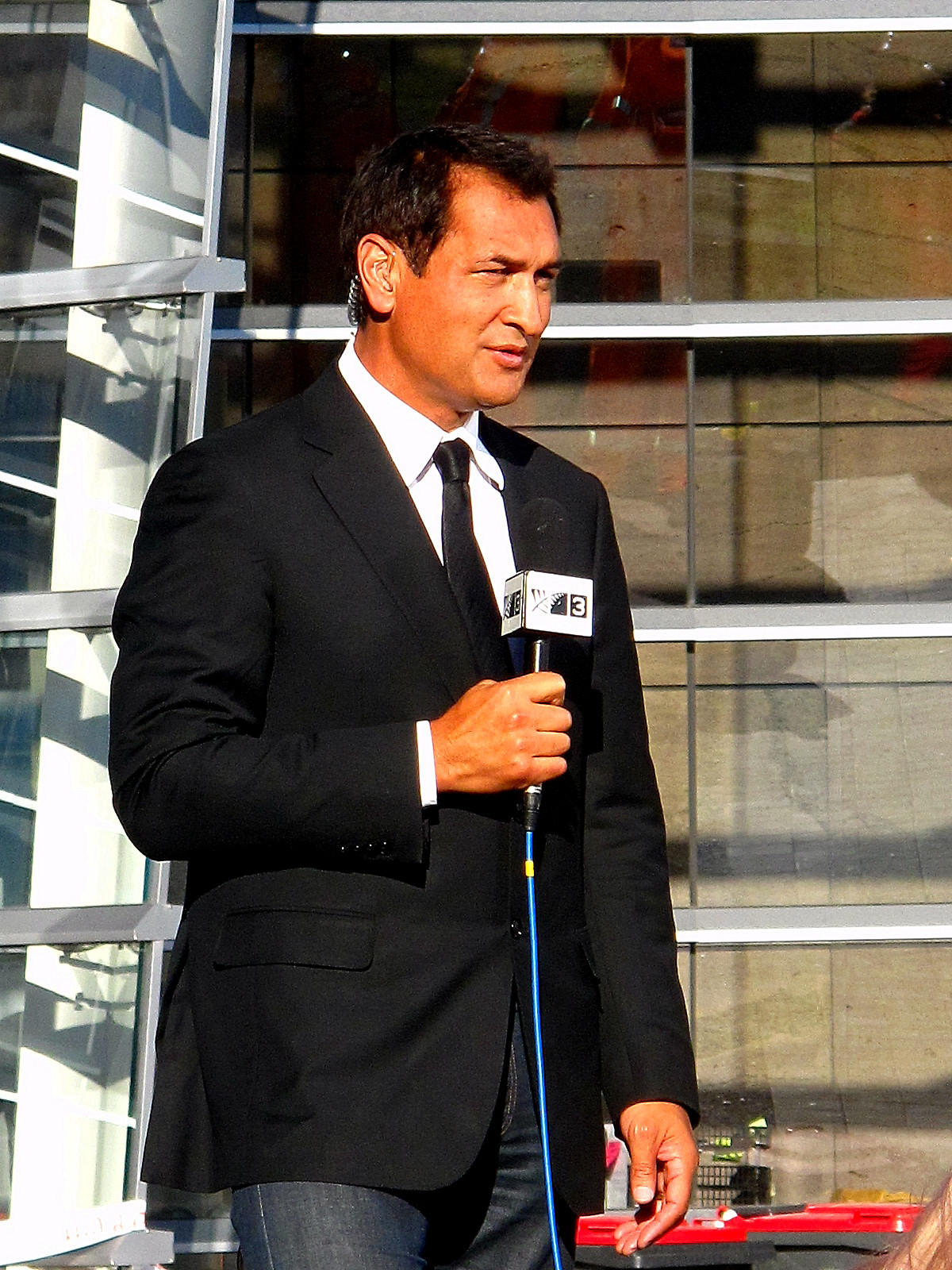
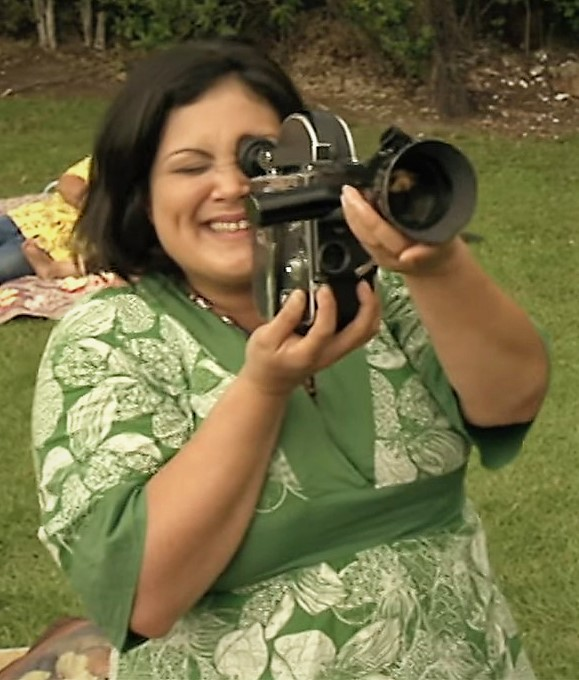
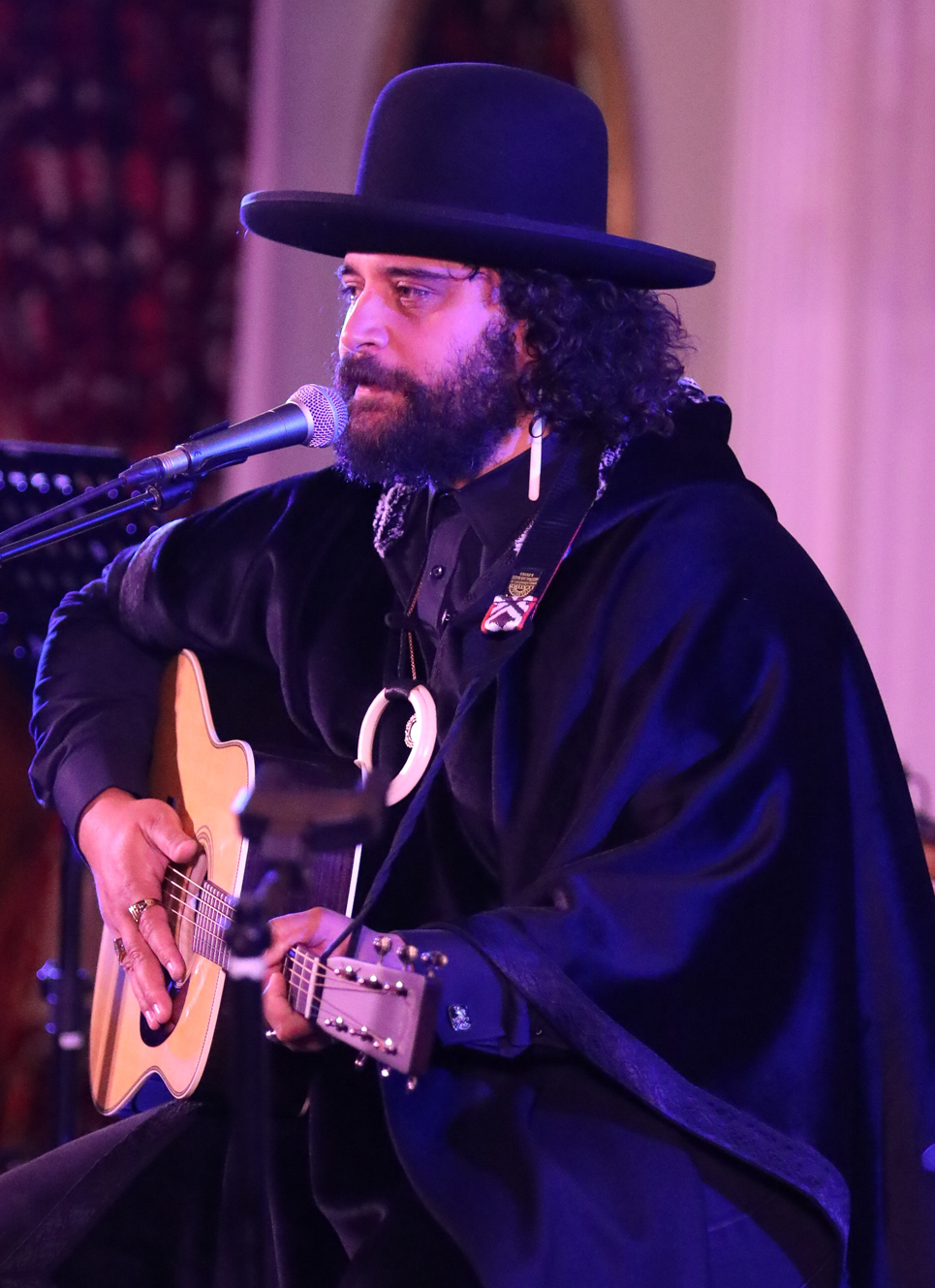
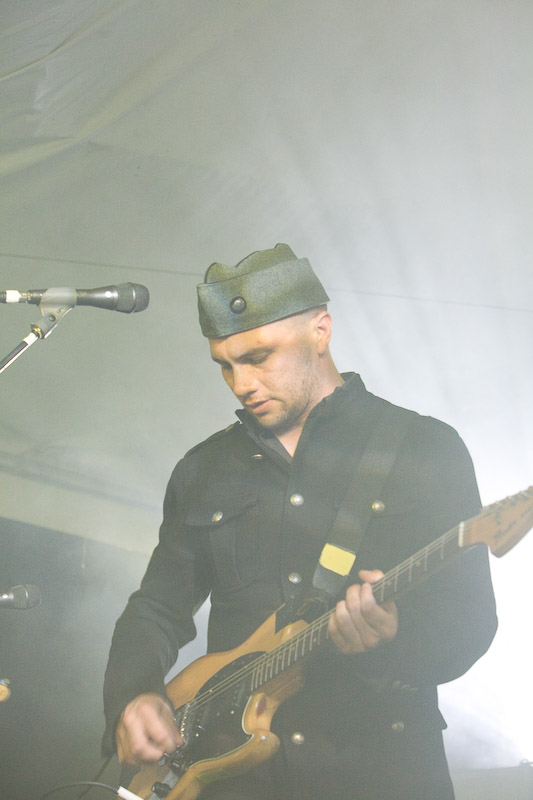
The celebrities who competed in the first season of The Masked Singer NZ, pictured in order of elimination (l-r):

Suzy Cato ("Tui"), Stephen Donald ("Moa"), Tom Sainsbury ("Alien"), Madeline Sami ("Monarch"), Mike McRoberts ("Orange Roughy"), Stephenie Tauevihi ("Pavlova"), Troy Kingi ("Sheep"), and Jason Kerrison ("Tuatara"),

Not pictured: Grace Palmer ("Possum"), Matilda Green ("Jellyfish"), Kings ("Monster"), and Joe Cotton ("Medusa")

=== Episode 1 (9 May) ===
Performances on the first episode
| # | Stage name | Song | Identity | Result |
|---|---|---|---|---|
| 1 | Tuatara | "Cosmic Girl" by Jamiroquai | undisclosed | WIN |
| 2 | Tui | "Woke Up Late" by Drax Project | Suzy Cato | OUT |
| 3 | Jellyfish | "Sway" by Bic Runga | undisclosed | WIN |
| 4 | Possum | "I'm Not the Only One" by Sam Smith | undisclosed | RISK |
| 5 | Alien | "Freestyler" by Bomfunk MC's | undisclosed | RISK |
| 6 | Medusa | "24K Magic" by Bruno Mars | undisclosed | WIN |

=== Episode 2 (10 May) ===
Performances on the second episode
| # | Stage name | Song | Identity | Result |
|---|---|---|---|---|
| 1 | Sheep | "Rolling In The Deep" by Adele | undisclosed | WIN |
| 2 | Monarch | "I Have Nothing" by Whitney Houston | undisclosed | RISK |
| 3 | Monster | "Blinding Lights" by The Weeknd | undisclosed | WIN |
| 4 | Moa | "Why Does Love Do This To Me" by The Exponents | Stephen Donald | OUT |
| 5 | Orange Roughy | "Footloose" by Kenny Loggins | undisclosed | RISK |
| 6 | Pavlova | "Shake It Off" by Taylor Swift | undisclosed | WIN |

=== Episode 3 (16 May) ===
Performances on the third episode
| # | Stage name | Song | Identity | Result |
|---|---|---|---|---|
| 1 | Alien | "Whip It" by Devo | Tom Sainsbury | OUT |
| 2 | Tuatara | "Higher Ground" by Stevie Wonder | undisclosed | SAFE |
| 3 | Jellyfish | "Blame It on Me" by George Ezra | undisclosed | SAFE |
| 4 | Possum | "I Love Rock 'n' Roll" by Joan Jett & the Blackhearts | undisclosed | RISK |
| 5 | Medusa | "Valerie" by Amy Winehouse | undisclosed | SAFE |

=== Episode 4 (17 May) ===
Performances on the fourth episode
| # | Stage name | Song | Identity | Result |
|---|---|---|---|---|
| 1 | Sheep | "Stay" by Rihanna ft. Mikky Ekko | undisclosed | SAFE |
| 2 | Monster | "Faith" by George Michael | undisclosed | RISK |
| 3 | Orange Roughy | "Shotgun" by George Ezra | undisclosed | SAFE |
| 4 | Monarch | "Breakaway" by Kelly Clarkson | Madeleine Sami | OUT |
| 5 | Pavlova | "I'm Still Standing" by Elton John | undisclosed | SAFE |

=== Episode 5 (23 May) ===
Performances on the fifth episode
| # | Stage name | Song | Identity | Result |
|---|---|---|---|---|
| 1 | Tuatara | "Shape of You" by Ed Sheeran | undisclosed | SAFE |
| 2 | Medusa | "Don't Start Now" by Dua Lipa | Undisclosed | RISK |
| 3 | Orange Roughy | "Catching Feelings" by Drax Project featuring Six60 | Mike McRoberts | OUT |
| 4 | Pavlova | "Sex on Fire" by Kings of Leon | undisclosed | SAFE |

=== Episode 6 (24 May) ===
Performances on the sixth episode
| # | Stage name | Song | Identity | Result |
|---|---|---|---|---|
| 1 | Possum | "Holding Out for a Hero" by Bonnie Tyler | Grace Palmer | OUT |
| 2 | Monster | "Bad Guy" by Billie Eilish | undisclosed | SAFE |
| 3 | Jellyfish | "Suffer" by Charlie Puth | undisclosed | SAFE |
| 4 | Sheep | "Get Lucky" by Daft Punk ft. Pharrell Williams | undisclosed | RISK |

=== Episode 7 (30 May) ===
Performances on the seventh episode
| # | Stage name | Song | Identity | Result |
|---|---|---|---|---|
| 1 | Medusa | "Supalonely" by Benee ft. Gus Dapperton | undisclosed | SAFE |
| 2 | Tuatara | "Cake by the Ocean" by DNCE | undisclosed | RISK |
| 3 | Monster | "Talk" by Khalid | undisclosed | SAFE |
| 4 | Jellyfish | "You Don't Own Me" by Lesley Gore | Matilda Green | OUT |
| 5 | Pavlova | "Back to Black" by Amy Winehouse | undisclosed | SAFE |
| 6 | Sheep | "Blister in the Sun" by Violent Femmes | undisclosed | SAFE |

=== Episode 8 (31 May) ===
Performances on the eighth episode
| # | Stage name | Song | Identity | Result |
|---|---|---|---|---|
| 1 | Medusa | "Wake Me Up Before You Go-Go" by Wham! | undisclosed | RISK |
| 2 | Monster | "Return of the Mack" by Mark Morrison | Kings | OUT |
| 3 | Pavlova | "Landslide" by Fleetwood Mac | undisclosed | SAFE |
| 4 | Tuatara | "Nobody Else" by Tex Pistol & Rikki Morris | undisclosed | SAFE |
| 5 | Sheep | "Turn the Beat Around" by Gloria Estefan | undisclosed | SAFE |

=== Episode 9 (6 June) ===
Performances on the ninth episode
| # | Stage name | Song | Identity | Result |
|---|---|---|---|---|
| 1 | Medusa | "Don't Stop Me Now" by Queen | undisclosed | RISK |
| 2 | Tuatara | "Wake Me Up" by Avicii ft. Aloe Blacc | undisclosed | SAFE |
| 3 | Sheep | "Let's Get it On" by Marvin Gaye | undisclosed | SAFE |
| 4 | Pavlova | "Never Tear Us Apart" by INXS | Stephanie Tauevihi | OUT |

=== Episode 11 (13 June) ===
Performances on the tenth episode
| # | Stage name | Song | Identity | Result |
Round One
| 1 | Tuatara | "Somebody to Love" by Queen | undisclosed | SAFE |
| 2 | Medusa | "Set Fire to the Rain" by Adele | Joe Cotton | THIRD |
| 3 | Sheep | "Señorita" by Justin Timberlake | undisclosed | SAFE |
Round Two
| 1 | Sheep | "Let's Get It On" by Marvin Gaye | Troy Kingi | RUNNER-UP |
| 2 | Tuatara | "Cake by the Ocean" by DNCE | Jason Kerrison | WINNER |

== Season 2 ==
| Contestant | Identity | Occupation(s) | Episodes | | | | | | | | | |
| Contestant | Identity | Occupation(s) | 1 | 2 | 3 | 4 | 5 | 6 | 7 | 8 | 9 | 11 |
|---|---|---|---|---|---|---|---|---|---|---|---|---|
| Bedazzled Unicorn | Hollie Smith | Singer | RISK | | SAFE | | RISK | | RISK | SAFE | SAFE | WINNER |
| Gladiator Alligator | Drew Ne'emia | TV Presenter | WIN | | SAFE | | SAFE | | SAFE | SAFE | SAFE | RUNNER-UP |
| Blue Penguin | Ria Hall | Singer | | RISK | | SAFE | | SAFE | SAFE | SAFE | RISK | THIRD |
| Magic Monster | Eroni Clarke | Former rugby player | | WIN | | RISK | | RISK | SAFE | RISK | OUT | |
| Ruru Chick | Laura Daniel | Comedian | WIN | | SAFE | | | SAFE | SAFE | OUT | | |
| Playing Mantis | Paul Ego (Note: Ego was also a guest panelist in episodes previously of the same season.) | Comedian | | WIN | | SAFE | SAFE | | OUT | | | |
| Retro Robot | Simon Bridges | Politician | WIN | | RISK | | | OUT | | | | |
| Shaggy Sheepdog | Mikey Havoc | Singer | | RISK | | SAFE | OUT | | | | | |
| Regal Rose | Antonia Prebble | Actress | | WIN | | OUT | | | | | | |
| Two-Scoop Ice Cream | Steven Ferguson | Canoeist | RISK | | OUT | | | | | | | |
| Two-Scoop Ice Cream | Shelley Ferguson | TV host | RISK | | OUT | | | | | | | |
| Sergeant Steak 'n Cheese | Guy Williams | Comedian | | OUT | | | | | | | | |
| Pōhutukawa Tree | Georgina Beyer | Politician | OUT | | | | | | | | | |

The masked singer won their face-off and remained in the competition.
The masked singer lost their face-off and was in the bottom three, but was not eliminated.
The masked singer was safe from elimination.
The masked singer was eliminated from the competition and unmasked upon their elimination.
The masked singer did not perform.
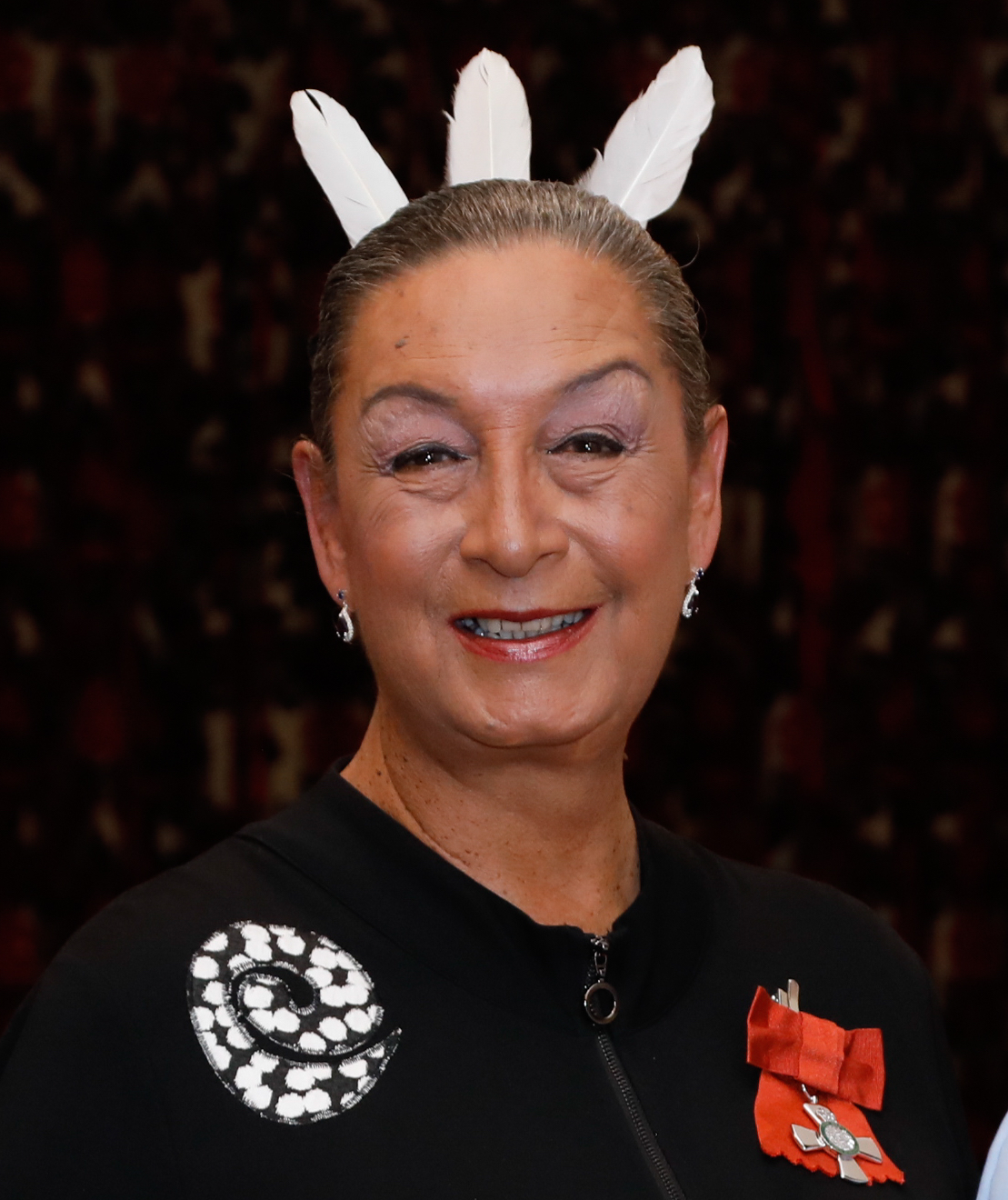
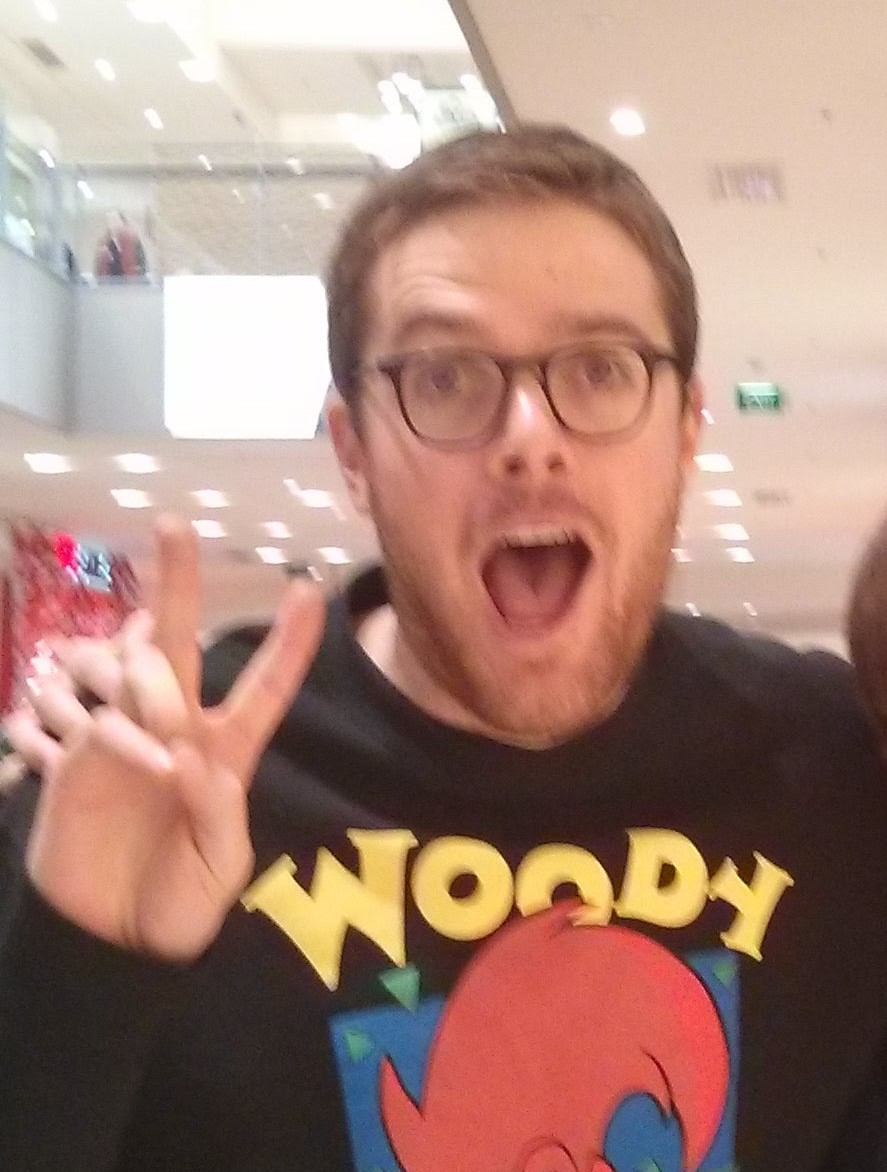
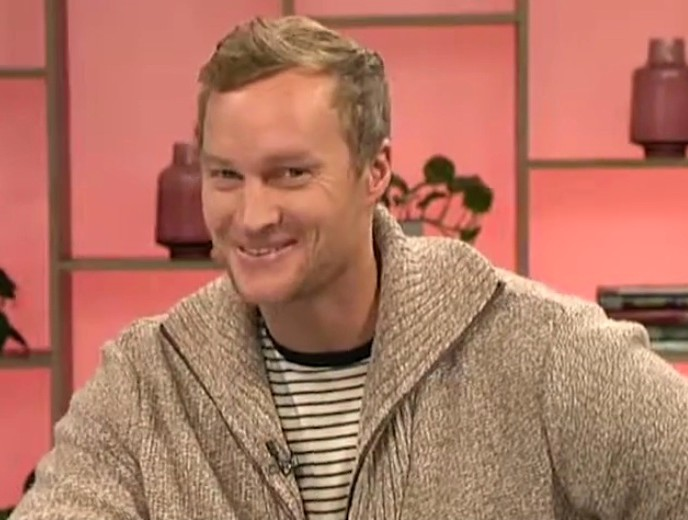
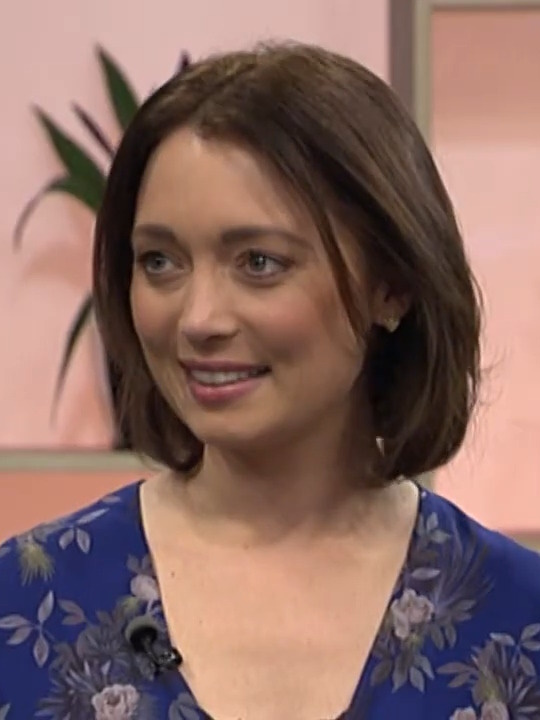
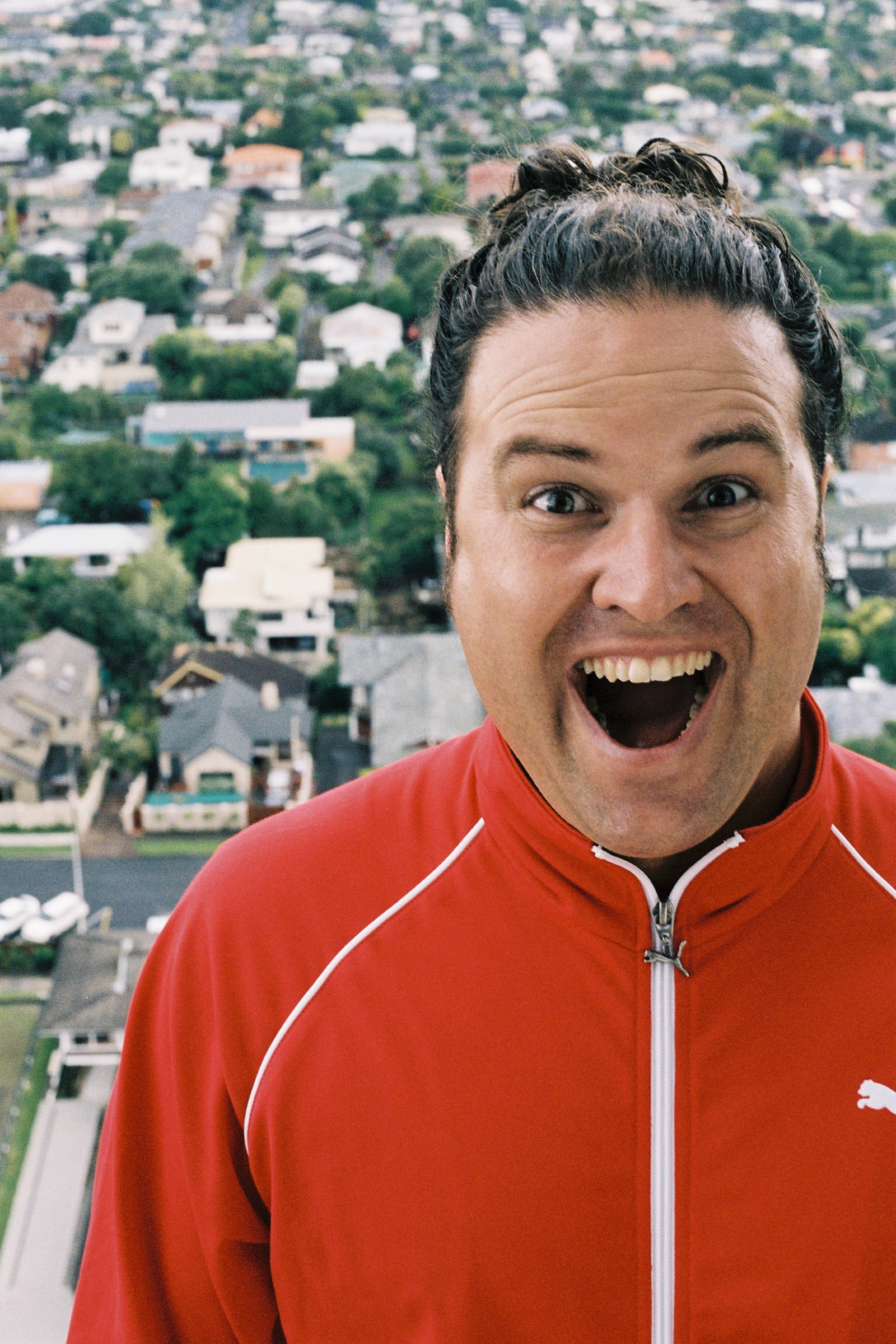
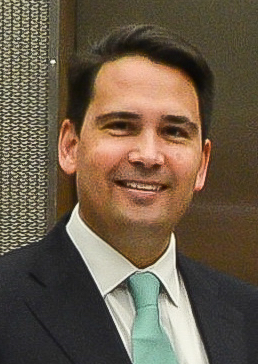
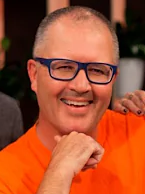
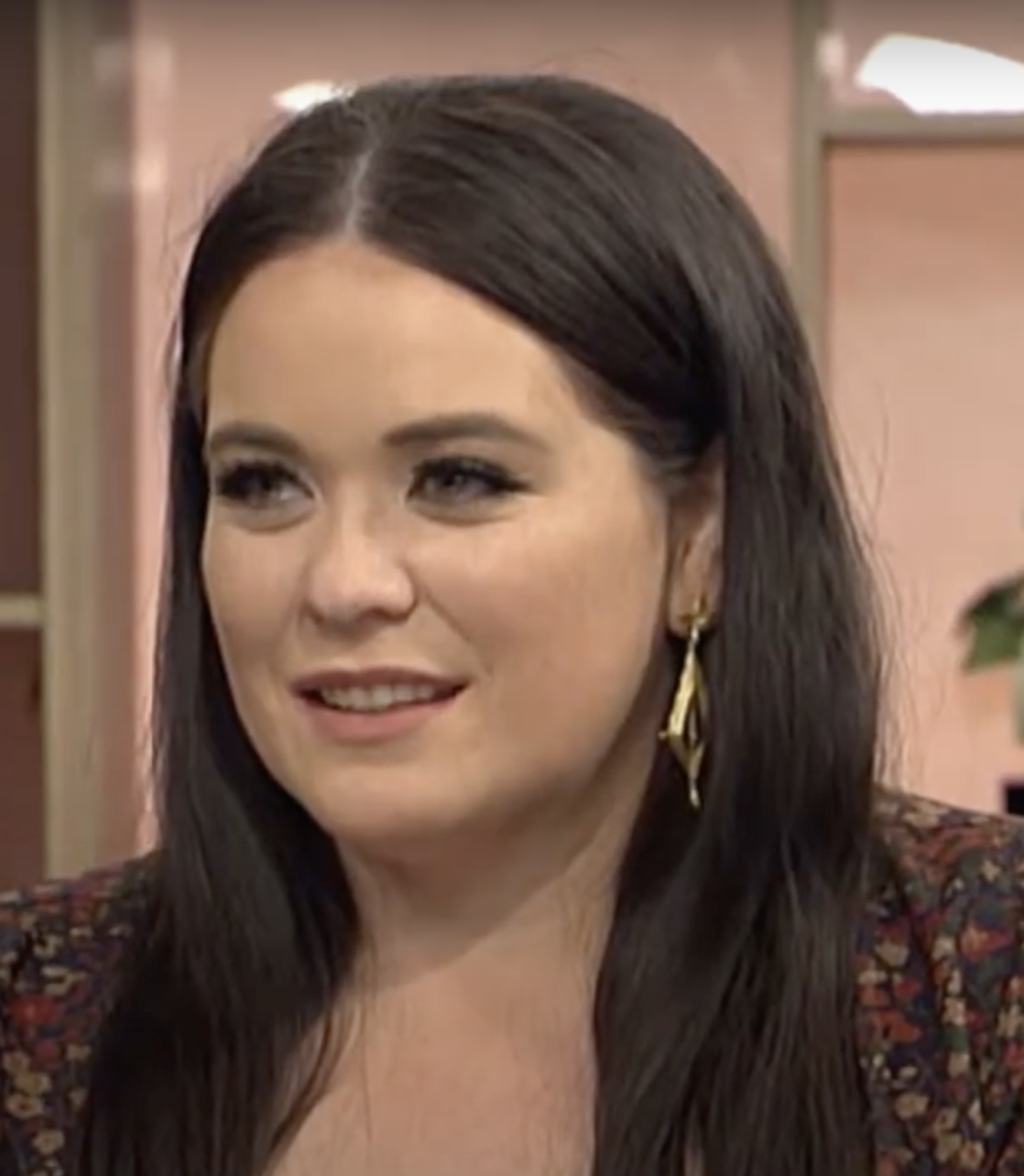
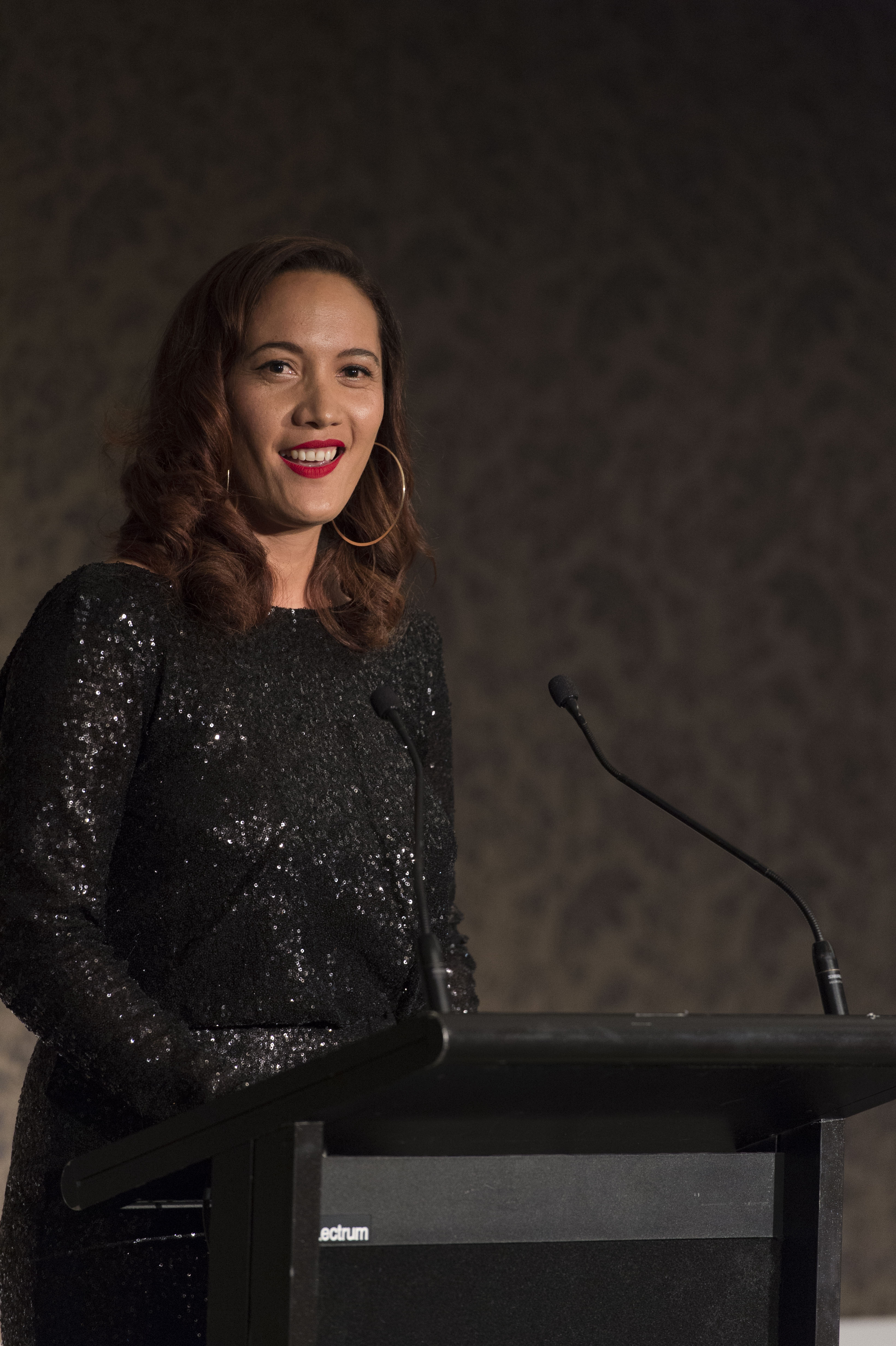
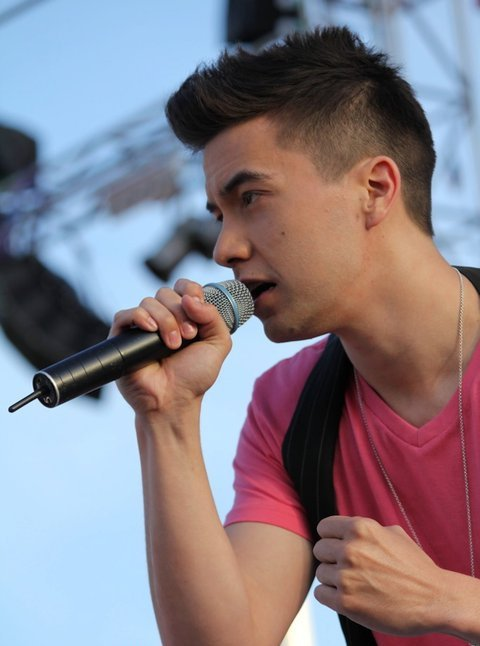
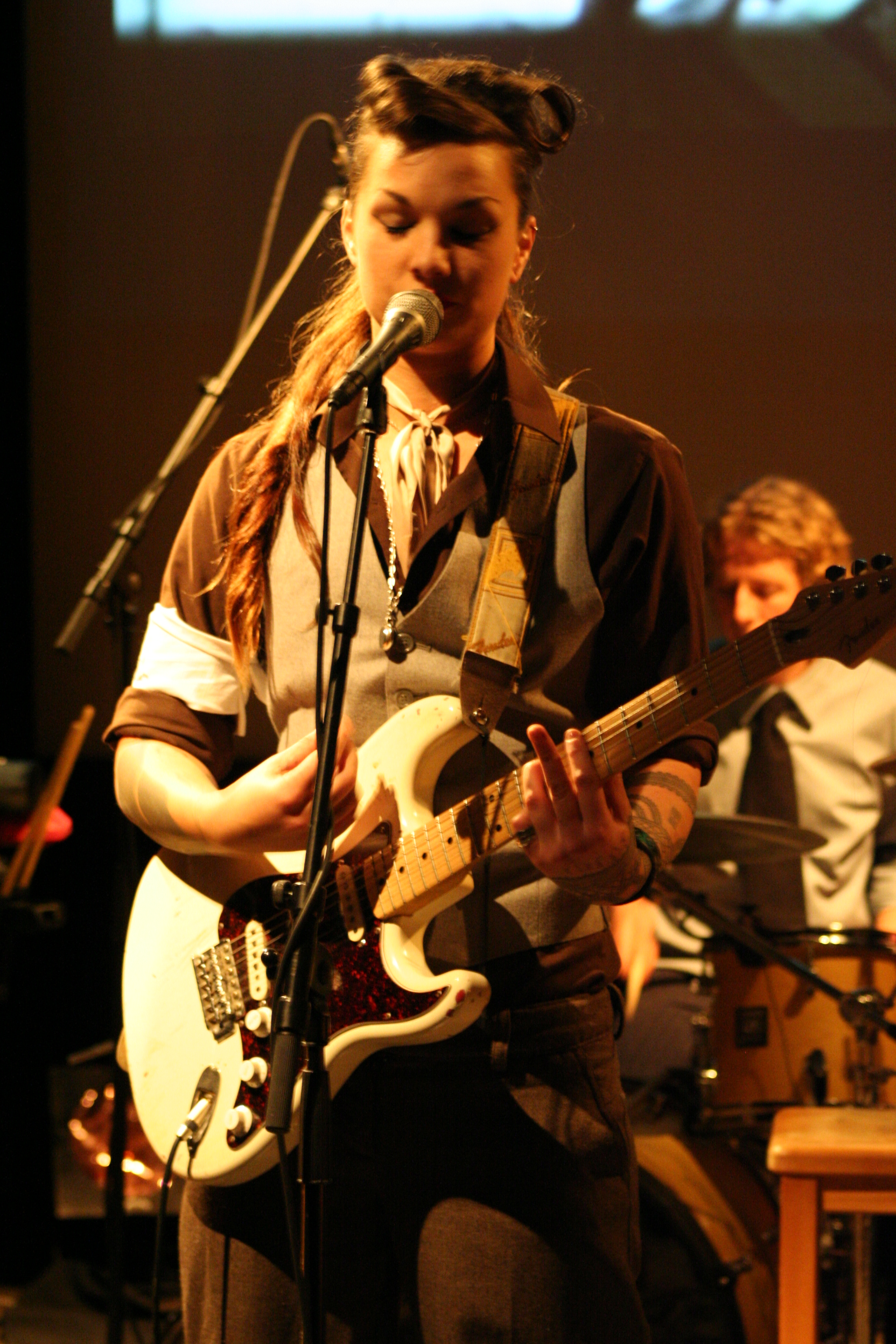
The celebrities who competed in the second season of The Masked Singer NZ, pictured in order of elimination (l-r):

Georgina Beyer ("Pōhutukawa Tree"), Guy Williams ("Sergeant Steak 'n Cheese"), Shane Ferguson ("Two-Scoop Ice Cream"), Antonia Prebble ("Regal Rose"), Mikey Havoc ("Shaggy Sheepdog"), Simon Bridges ("Retro Robot"), Paul Ego ("Playing Mantis"), Laura Daniels ("Ruru Chick"), Ria Hall ("Blue Penguin"), Drew Ne'emia ("Gladiator Alligator") and Hollie Smith ("Bedazzled Unicorn")

Not Pictured: Shelley Ferguson ("Two-Scoop Ice Cream") and Eroni Clarke ("Magic Monster")

=== Episode 1 (24 July) ===
Performances on the first episode
| # | Stage name | Song | Identity | Result |
|---|---|---|---|---|
| 1 | Bedazzled Unicorn | "Not Many" by Scribe | undisclosed | RISK |
| 2 | Retro Robot | "Cry Me a River" by Michael Bublé | undisclosed | WIN |
| 3 | Gladiator Alligator | "Moondance" by Van Morrison | undisclosed | WIN |
| 4 | Pōhutukawa Tree | "Fever" by Peggy Lee | Georgina Beyer | OUT |
| 5 | Ruru Chick | "Dancing On My Own" by Robyn | undisclosed | WIN |
| 6 | Two-Scoop Ice Cream | "Cold Heart" by Elton John & Dua Lipa | undisclosed | RISK |
| 6 | Two-Scoop Ice Cream | "Cold Heart" by Elton John & Dua Lipa | undisclosed | RISK |

=== Episode 2 (31 July) ===
Performances on the second episode
| # | Stage name | Song | Identity | Result |
|---|---|---|---|---|
| 1 | Blue Penguin | "You Oughta Know" by Alanis Morissette | undisclosed | RISK |
| 2 | Playing Mantis | "Father and Son" by Cat Stevens | undisclosed | WIN |
| 3 | Regal Rose | "Lips Are Movin" by Meghan Trainor | undisclosed | WIN |
| 4 | Sergeant Steak 'n Cheese | "If I Could Turn Back Time" by Cher | Guy Williams | OUT |
| 5 | Shaggy Sheepdog | "Total Eclipse of the Heart" by Bonnie Tyler | undisclosed | RISK |
| 6 | Magic Monster | "Leave the Door Open" by Silk Sonic | undisclosed | WIN |

=== Episode 3 (7 August) ===
Performances on the third episode
| # | Stage name | Song | Identity | Result |
|---|---|---|---|---|
| 1 | Retro Robot | "Believer" by Imagine Dragons | undisclosed | RISK |
| 2 | Two-Scoop Ice Cream | "Somethin' Stupid" by Frank Sinatra & Nancy Sinatra | Shelley Ferguson | OUT |
| 2 | Two-Scoop Ice Cream | "Somethin' Stupid" by Frank Sinatra & Nancy Sinatra | Steven Ferguson | OUT |
| 3 | Bedazzled Unicorn | "I Dreamed a Dream" by Susan Boyle | undisclosed | SAFE |
| 4 | Ruru Chick | "Fly Me to the Moon" by Frank Sinatra | undisclosed | SAFE |
| 5 | Gladiator Alligator | "Canción del Mariachi" by Antonio Banderas & Los Lobos | undisclosed | SAFE |

=== Episode 4 (14 August) ===
Performances on the fourth episode
| # | Stage name | Song | Identity | Result |
|---|---|---|---|---|
| 1 | Playing Mantis | "Love on the Run" by Sons of Zion featuring Jackson Owens | undisclosed | SAFE |
| 2 | Regal Rose | "Time After Time" by Cyndi Lauper | Antonia Prebble | OUT |
| 3 | Blue Penguin | "Shallow" by Lady Gaga & Bradley Cooper | undisclosed | SAFE |
| 4 | Magic Monster | "It's Not Unusual" by Tom Jones | undisclosed | RISK |
| 5 | Shaggy Sheepdog | "It's a Man's Man's Man's World" by James Brown | undisclosed | SAFE |

=== Episode 5 (21 August) ===
Performances on the fifth episode
| # | Stage name | Song | Identity | Result |
|---|---|---|---|---|
| 1 | Playing Mantis | "Watermelon Sugar" by Harry Styles | undisclosed | SAFE |
| 2 | Gladiator Alligator | "Perfect" by Ed Sheeran | undisclosed | SAFE |
| 3 | Shaggy Sheepdog | “Beggin'” by Måneskin | Mikey Havoc | OUT |
| 4 | Bedazzled Unicorn | "Lose You to Love Me" by Selena Gomez | undisclosed | RISK |

=== Episode 6 (28 August) ===
Performances on the sixth episode
| # | Stage name | Song | Identity | Result |
|---|---|---|---|---|
| 1 | Magic Monster | "Bruises" by Lewis Capaldi | undisclosed | RISK |
| 2 | Ruru Chick | "Higher Love" by Kygo & Whitney Houston | undisclosed | SAFE |
| 3 | Retro Robot | "(You Make Me Feel Like) A Natural Woman" by Aretha Franklin | Simon Bridges | OUT |
| 4 | Blue Penguin | "Tennessee Whiskey" by Chris Stapleton | undisclosed | SAFE |

=== Episode 7 (4 September) ===
Performances on the seventh episode
| # | Stage name | Song | Identity | Result |
|---|---|---|---|---|
| 1 | Bedazzled Unicorn | "Sitting Inside My Head" by Supergroove | undisclosed | RISK |
| 2 | Magic Monster | "Better Be Home Soon" by Crowded House | undisclosed | SAFE |
| 3 | Ruru Chick | "Rainbow" by Kacey Musgraves | undisclosed | SAFE |
| 4 | Playing Mantis | "I Got You" by Split Enz | Paul Ego | OUT |
| 5 | Gladiator Alligator | "Blue Ain't Your Color" by Keith Urban | undisclosed | SAFE |
| 6 | Blue Penguin | "If I Were a Boy" by Beyoncé | undisclosed | SAFE |

=== Episode 8 (11 September) ===
Performances on the eighth episode
| # | Stage name | Song | Identity | Result |
|---|---|---|---|---|
| 1 | Gladiator Alligator | "This City" by Sam Fischer | undisclosed | SAFE |
| 2 | Bedazzled Unicorn | "In Colour" by Shapeshifter | undisclosed | SAFE |
| 3 | Ruru Chick | "Stupid Love" by Lady Gaga | Laura Daniel | OUT |
| 4 | Magic Monster | "Sing To You" by John Splithoff | undisclosed | RISK |
| 5 | Blue Penguin | "Something's Got a Hold on Me" by Etta James | undisclosed | SAFE |

=== Episode 9 (18 September) ===
Performances on the ninth episode
| # | Stage name | Song | Identity | Result |
|---|---|---|---|---|
| 1 | Bedazzled Unicorn | "I Shot the Sheriff" by Bob Marley and the Wailers | undisclosed | SAFE |
| 2 | Magic Monster | "You Oughta Be in Love" by Dave Dobbyn | Eroni Clarke | OUT |
| 3 | Blue Penguin | "In the Air Tonight" by Phil Collins | undisclosed | RISK |
| 4 | Gladiator Alligator | "When I Get You Alone" by Robin Thicke | undisclosed | SAFE |

=== Episode 11 (2 October) ===
Performances on the eleventh episode
| # | Stage name | Song | Identity | Result |
Round One
| 1 | Bedazzled Unicorn | "Proud Mary" by Tina Turner | undisclosed | SAFE |
| 2 | Gladiator Alligator | "It's Gonna Be Me" by NSYNC | undisclosed | SAFE |
| 3 | Blue Penguin | "What About Us" by Pink | Ria Hall | THIRD |
Round Two
| 1 | Bedazzled Unicorn | "Fly Away" by Tones and I | Hollie Smith | WINNER |
| 2 | Gladiator Alligator | "Hallelujah" by Leonard Cohen | Drew Ne'emia | RUNNER-UP |
