= New Zealand Today =

New Zealand satirical news show

- Genre: Comedy
- Narrated by: Guy Williams
- Country of origin: New Zealand
- Original language: English
- No. of series: 4
- No. of episodes: 36

Production
- Producers: Kevin & Co.
- Running time: 30-minute episodes

Original release
- Network: Three
- Release: 23 August 2019 – present

Related
- Jono and Ben; Wanna-Ben

New Zealand Today is a satirical news and entertainment show hosted by Guy Williams in New Zealand airing on Three. It features Williams investigating odd and humorous stories across New Zealand. The show began airing on 23 August 2019. New Zealand Today is a spin-off of the Jono and Ben segment of the same name.

== History ==
After the show's launch in 2019, it only lasted one season before being cancelled as part of Three's cost-cutting measures to ready the station for sale.

In July 2020, Guy Williams stated that New Zealand Today had been "resurrected and approved for development", and that a second season would be possible.

In April 2021, the show was revived for a second season and began airing.

On 1 December 2021, a podcast spin-off was launched where Williams is joined by Karen Hill, who featured previously on the show.

In June 2022, a third season was aired.

In December 2022, Guy Williams announced via Instagram that New Zealand Today would have a fourth season in 2023.

On 27 August 2025, Guy Williams announced via Instagram that New Zealand Tomorrow would stream now and broadcast that night.

In 2025, Guy Williams' new iteration of the series is a "combination of journalism and comedy", New Zealand Tomorrow, about Waimate ("everyone joked about 'don't drink the water'"), the presence of nitrates in New Zealand’s water supply, bowel cancer, and other health issues, as a result of severe over-farming.

"...where New Zealand Today insisted on not being taken seriously, Tomorrow is forced into a position where it must take itself seriously, because there is literally no one else to do the work of in-depth reportage that Williams finds himself doing following the closure of Newshub"

== Series overview ==
Series	Episodes	Originally aired	
Series	Episodes	series premiere	series finale
1	8	23 August 2019	11 October 2019
2	10	8 April 2021	10 June 2022
3	10	9 June 2022	11 August 2022
4	8	8 February 2024	28 March 2024

== Episodes ==
=== Season 1 ===
No. overall	No. in season	Original release date
1	1	23 August 2019
Guy investigates a racism scandal and takes a trip to Whanganui, where a woman made her own coffin only to have it stolen, long before she was dead enough to use it.
2	2	30 August 2019
Guy meets with an ex-convict who promotes healthy eating. Then, the team uncovers supernatural happenings in Marton. Can Guy rid the town of its ghosts?
3	3	6 September 2019
Opononi is still obsessed with a dolphin that lived over 60 years ago. Then in the capital of brown trout fishing, Guy tracks down a fugitive who has been taunting police online.
4	4	13 September 2019
Guy tracks down the infamous internet celebrity Karen, who wanted her $20 back. Then, how will the town of Murupara get by after their last ATM was stolen? Guy has a solution!
5	5	20 September 2019
Guy meets 'The Ukelele Lady' who is harbouring a dark secret. Then in the strange world of Mascot racing, Guy meets the former mascots at the centre of a cheating scandal.
6	6	27 September 2019
Guy travels to Taranaki to investigate a slogan scandal which is like none you've heard before. Can he find who is responsible and fulfil his Guy Williams guarantee?
7	7	4 October 2019
Guy investigates the flat earth community. Then, why are there two Mt Albert BBQ Noodle houses right next to each other? Which is the real one and which is the best one?
8	8	11 October 2019
Guy investigates a case of six consecutive code browns in Invercargill's aquatic centre. Then why would a man get banned from his favourite pub for 10 years?

=== Season 2 ===
This is a caption
No. overall	No. in season	Original release date
9	1	8 April 2021
Guy heads to Feilding in Manawatu, which claims to be New Zealand's most beautiful town after taking the title 16 times in the award's 32-year history.
10	2	15 April 2021
Guy heads to the windy capital to investigate what is quite possibly the biggest story of the year - a man who broke into Wellington Zoo to steal a monkey.
11	3	22 April 2021
Guy steps outside of his comfort zone as he travels to Geraldine and further into the Southern Alps to explore the 'art' of Tahr hunting.
12	4	29 April 2021
Guy heads back to Christchurch to find out what happened to the Wizard, a legend in Cathedral Square for several decades.
13	5	6 May 2021
Guy travels to the small Manawatu town of Woodville to investigate the story of a man who chainsawed the 'private parts' off a local carving.
14	6	13 May 2021
Guy heads to Christchurch to learn more about the nocturnal world of boy racers, before jetting off to Huntly to investigate an unusual spate of sex toys.
15	7	20 May 2021
Guy travels to Mermaids, Wellington's iconic strip club, to investigate a missing fish tank. Then, onto Wainuiomata to get to the bottom of some unconventional means of travel.
16	8	27 May 2021
Guy heads to his hometown of Nelson to investigate conspiracy theories surrounding 5G Technology.
17	9	3 June 2021
Guy returns to Taranaki to visit outspoken New Plymouth district councillor Murray Chong, who stood as a candidate for the New Conservative party at the last election. Later, he goes undercover to stay at the worst reviewed motel in the country.
18	10	10 June 2021
Guy heads to Granity to try and save the sinking town, then over to Millerton's no. 1 punk rock radio station Bedrock FM to help solve the mystery of who stole their CDs!

=== Season 3 ===
No. overall	No. in season	Original release date
19	1	9 June 2022
Guy returns to Golden Bay to visit Nganga, who has gone off the Covid-19 conspiracy deep end, and investigates slippery tiles causing chaos with Picton's elderly population.
20	2	16 June 2022
Guy tries to reunite two best mates estranged over a crashed car, then meets Crown Xu, military enthusiast, army tank owner, and maybe a new best mate for Guy?
21	3	23 June 2022
Guy sets up a sting on a Hamilton burger bar owner who refuses to hire Indian workers, only to find that the business owner is the last person he would have expected.
22	4	30 June 2022
Guy investigates the mysterious case of a missing playground in Tokoroa and sets out to recruit a final member for the New Zealand women's medieval combat team.
23	5	7 July 2022
Ten years since Guy met alleged scammer Ken Eastwood, is Ken at it again, or could he be dead? And Guy investigates the scourge of the South Island freedom campers.
24	6	14 July 2022
Guy tries to stop Leo Molloy's Auckland Mayoral campaign, and investigates the disappearance of local cats long rumoured to be at the hands of the Raglan cat killer.
25	7	21 July 2022
Guy brings back the much loved Dargaville Beauty Pageant and tries to help aspiring but incompetent stuntman Crazy Craig become a legit stunt performer.
26	8	28 July 2022
Guy meets the grower of what could be the world's heaviest potato and tracks down the source of Vengaboys music blasting in West Auckland.
27	9	4 August 2022
Guy embarks on a journey of discovery about correct pronunciation of Māori and Pasifika names.
28	10	11 August 2022
Guy reconnects with his old friend, Pebbles Hooper to see if he can get her uncancelled, and comes face to face with a notorious peddler of conspiracy theories.

=== Season 4 ===
No. overall	No. in season	Original release date
29	1	8 February 2024
Which Mt Albert BBQ Noodle House is better? It is time for Guy to finally put this query to rest with the help of a Chinese succulent meal master, Jack Karlson?
30	2	15 February 2024
Guy finally tracks down the man from the legendary "Otahuhu Bomb Scare" news video.
31	3	22 February 2024
In 2019 Guy was booed off stage in Oamaru when he tried to pronounce "Oamaru" correctly! Now Guy is back, and looking for revenge!
32	4	29 February 2024
Retired coal miners have had their agreement of 10 tonnes of heavily discounted coal every year broken by their former employer.
33	5	7 March 2024
Guy confronts NZ's most infamous criminal in order to get an apology for a woman he hurt when falling through a roof during an escape from police.
34	6	14 March 2024
Guy tracks down NZ's most famous lawn mower and is both shocked and stoked when he finally sits down with the legendary "Jim". Then, there's a Naked Baker in trouble.
35	7	21 March 2024
Guy returns to Invercargill to sort out their new Mayor. Paraparaumu isn't any better as Guy meets a former Councillor forced to stand down for wearing a KKK hood.
36	8	28 March 2024
Guy attempts to catch a man in Timaru, famous for outrunning the police on a mobility scooter. Guy then ambushes our new PM with a question no one knew needed answering.
