= Sharyn Casey =

New Zealand radio presenter

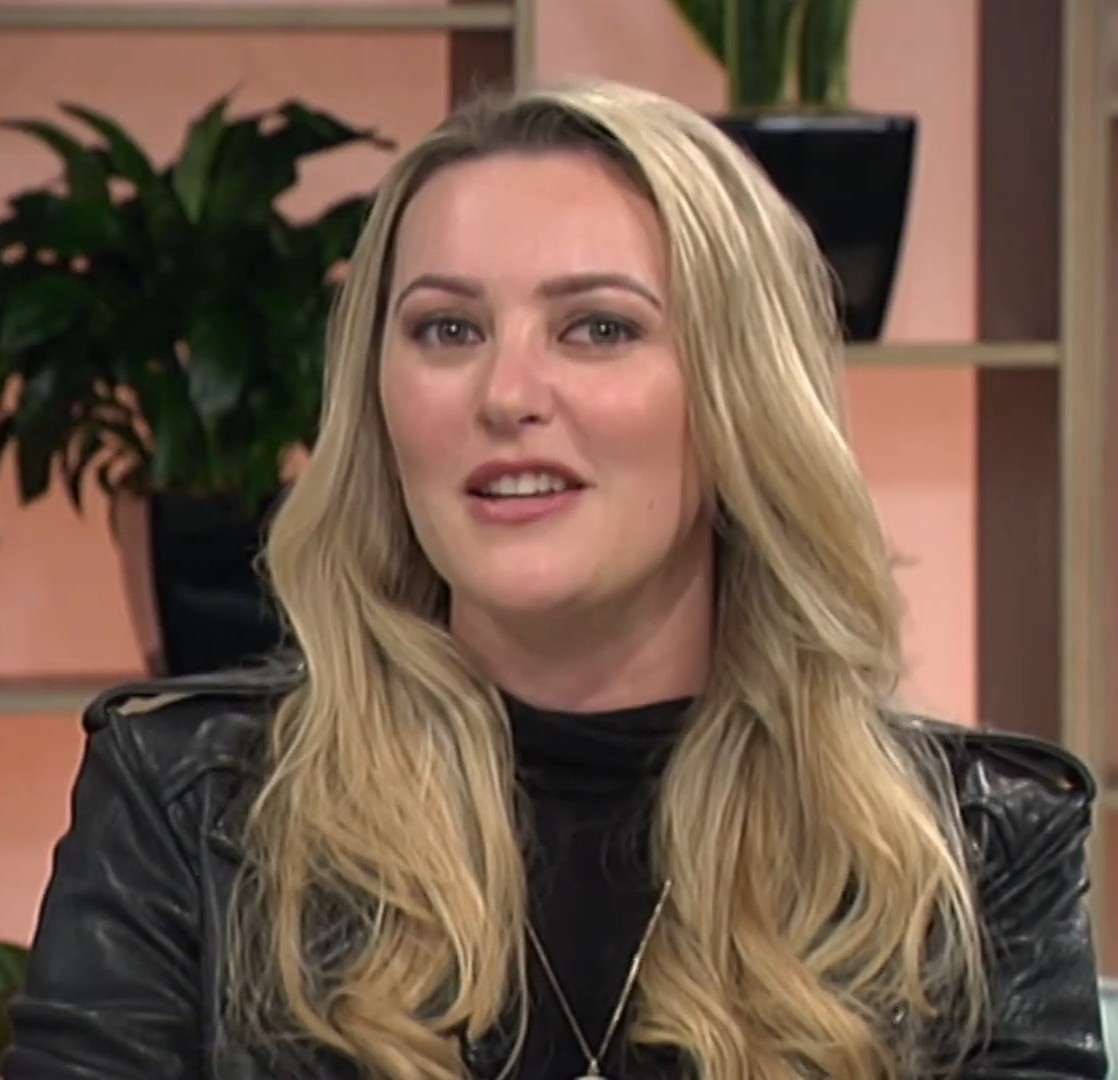
- Casey in 2018
- Born: Sharyn Mary-Ellen Wakefield; 24 December 1985 (age 40); Porirua
- Spouse: Bryce Casey (m. 2012)
- Children: 2
- Presenting career
- Show: The Edge Afternoons with Sharyn, Steph & Nickson
- Station: The Edge
- Network: MediaWorks
- Time slot: 3 pm – 7 pm
- Country: New Zealand

Sharyn Mary-Ellen Casey (née Wakefield; born 24 December 1985) is a radio and TV host. She has hosted The Edge's drive show, the New Zealand version of Dancing with the Stars, and was a celebrity panelist on The Masked Singer NZ.

== Early life ==
Casey was born on 24 December 1985 in Porirua, before moving to Waimate, where she attended Waimate Main School, and later Timaru, where she spent most of her childhood and attended Gleniti School. At 13, she moved to Christchurch, where she attended Avonside Girls' High School; she later moved to Wellington and attended Tawa College.

From an early age, she was interested in radio and pop culture and music. She left school at the age of 15 and worked at Smiths City, and later at Woolworths supermarket for 6 months. While working in the signing tent for record store Sounds at Edgefest, she was inspired by Sounds marketing manager Shaun Joyce to pursue a job in radio; she applied for radio school the next day and went on to study broadcasting at the NZ Radio Training School in Wellington.

== Career ==
Casey began her broadcasting career at More FM Wairarapa in June 2005, cohosting the breakfast show with Brent Gare, as well as running promotions for More FM, Solid Gold, and RadioLive. She started working at The Edge in April 2006 after winning the promotion Quit Your Day Job. She cohosted the nightshow with Brad Watson until the end of 2010. In 2011, she started reading the news on The Breakfast show with Jay Jay Mike & Dom & was hosting the weekdays show from midday to 3 pm, as well as being the music director. In 2012, she began appearing on Four Live, before cohosting it in 2013 with Shannon Ryan.

After filling in on The Edge's breakfast show at the end of 2013 with Guy Williams and Clint Roberts, they started hosting The Edge Afternoons with Guy, Sharyn & Clint and The Edge Fat 40 with Guy, Sharyn & Clint in 2014. This lasted until the end of 2016, when Williams and Roberts left The Edge, the latter moving to sister station George FM to anchor the breakfast show. In 2015, she hosted The Music Lab on The Edge TV, cohosted The Xtra Factor with Williams and Roberts, and cohosted the sixth series of the New Zealand version of Dancing with the Stars.

In 2017, she continued cohosting The Edge drive show – now called The Edge Afternoons with Jono, Ben & Sharyn – with Jono Pryor and Ben Boyce; she also made cameo appearances on the duo's TV show, Jono and Ben, (until it ended in November 2018). She also made cameo appearances in The Moe Show and Shortland Street.

In 2018, she cohosted the seventh series of Dancing with the Stars, and narrated Gogglebox NZ, the New Zealand version of UK reality TV programme Gogglebox.

In 2019, she cohosted the eighth series of Dancing with the Stars and launched the podcast The Trainee Sexologist with co-host Morgan Penn.

In 2020, Jono and Ben left the Edge, and Casey starting cohosting The Edge drive show – now called The Edge Afternoons with Sharyn & Jayden – with Jayden King, who won the Quit Your Day Job competition at the end of 2019.

In 2021, Casey was a celebrity panelist on The Masked Singer NZ.

In 2022, she cohosted the ninth series of Dancing with the Stars.

In 2023, Casey started hosted The Edge drive show with Steph Monks and Nickson Clark.

In July 2024, she launched a new podcast, Better Me, Hopefully.

In December 2024, Casey announced she was leaving The Edge to spend time with her children, and work on special projects for MediaWorks' digital brand, rova

== Personal life ==
Casey married The Rock radio host Bryce Casey on 6 October 2012. They have two sons, Tyson Lloyd Casey, born on 4 January 2018, and Reuben Ammar Casey, born on 7 November 2021. They also have a dog called Warren G (after rapper Warren G).
