= Guy Williams (comedian) =

New Zealand television personality

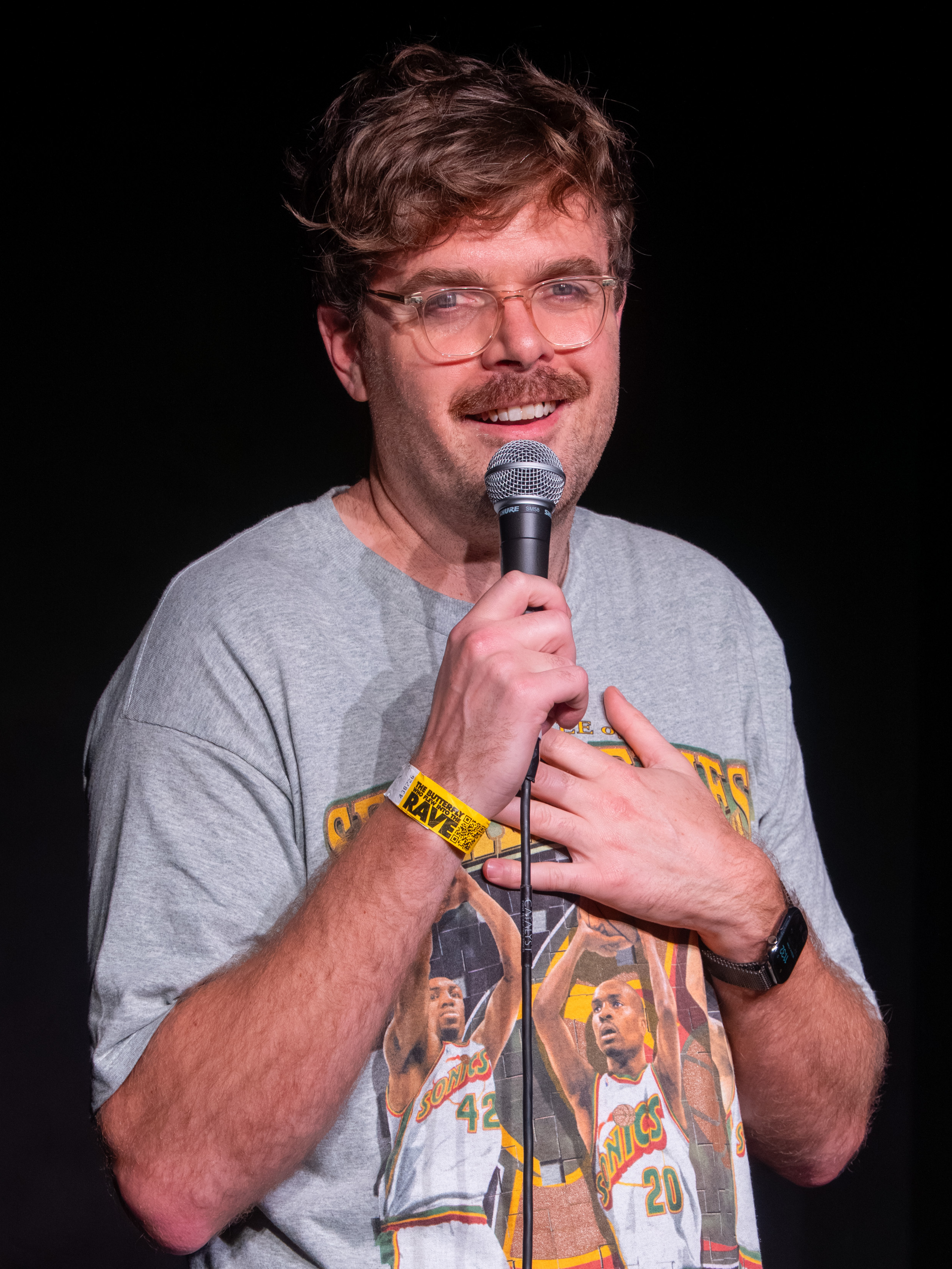
- Williams at the 2025 Edinburgh Festival Fringe
- Born: Guy Malachi Jones Williams; 19 September 1987 (age 39); Christchurch, New Zealand
- Education: Victoria University of Wellington
- Employer: Sky Free
- Height: 6 ft 5 in (196 cm)
- Father: Gary Williams
- Relatives: Paul Williams (brother)

Comedy career
- Years active: 2008–present
- Medium: Stand-up; Television; Radio

YouTube information
- Channel: New Zealand Today
- Genre: Comedy
- Subscribers: 292 thousand
- Views: 129 million
- Last updated: 24 June 2026

Guy Malachi Jones Williams (born 19 September 1987) is a New Zealand comedian and television personality. Since 2019, Williams has been the host of New Zealand Today, a show detailing the lives and events of New Zealand towns and the people who live in them. He was previously a co-host on the satirical news and entertainment television programme Jono and Ben until the show's end in 2018.

== Early life ==
Williams was born in Christchurch to Gary and Roseanne Williams and moved to Nelson when he was twelve months old. His younger brother is comedian Paul Williams, and younger sister improviser Maria Williams. He attended primary school at St. Joseph's School, and was educated at Nelson College from 2001 to 2005; in 2005 he travelled to Gallipoli with Prime Minister Helen Clark after winning a student essay competition. He was a member of the school's 'A' basketball team from 2003 to 2005.

He attended Victoria University of Wellington and graduated with a Bachelor of Arts degree majoring in political science in 2011. While at Victoria University, he held the positions of Victoria University of Wellington Students Association Activities Officer in 2009, and ran for president in 2010 but withdrew his application for the latter.

== Career ==
Williams began performing stand-up comedy in Wellington in 2007. In 2009 he performed as Dai Henwood's opening act after winning Dai's Protégé Project. He is a regular performer in the New Zealand Comedy Festival in Wellington and Auckland.

In 2010, he started co-hosting on The Jono Project, where he appeared on TVNZ's breakfast show in a prank in which he claimed to be a promoter of commercial whaling in New Zealand as a way to save whales. When the show was merged with WANNA-BEn in 2012 to form Jono and Ben at Ten, Williams followed. He was promoted to co-host in 2013.

In 2012, Williams won the Billy T Award for his debut solo show On the Verge of Nothing.

On 15 January 2014, it was announced in a press release that Williams would join The Edge in a new radio show, The Edge Afternoons with Guy, Sharyn & Clint, with Sharyn Casey and Clint Roberts. In comedic fashion, he is quoted in the press release as saying: "It has been my dream to work on The Edge radio station ever since last week when they told me I would be working on The Edge radio station. I'm super excited to make my dream a reality." In March 2014, Williams was selected by TV Guide magazine as New Zealand's Sexiest Male Television Personality, beating Shortland Street's Benjamin Mitchell, who had won the award for several years beforehand. He also co-hosted The Xtra Factor, a follow-up programme of The X Factor with Casey and Roberts from March–May 2015.

In June 2015, he began narrating Come Dine with Me New Zealand.

In September 2015, Williams released a charity single entitled "The Pigeon Song", featuring Christchurch rapper Scribe. It peaked at the number two position in the New Zealand singles chart.

In 2016, Williams left The Edge saying he would focus on television projects and other work. He released his first half-hour standup special in 2017, and started hosting the satirical news show New Zealand Today in 2019. Williams also competed on the first season of Taskmaster New Zealand in 2020 and appeared on Guy Montgomery's Guy Mont-Spelling Bee in 2023.

In December 2024, Williams revealed had been diagnosed with attention deficit hyperactivity disorder (ADHD) as part of a TVNZ documentary, ADHD - Not Just Hyper. The documentary follows Williams, who is diagnosed on camera, and his sister Maria, who was diagnosed in 2022, learning to live with the condition.

In 2025, Williams confronted ACT New Zealand party leader David Seymour at an impromptu press conference during the 2025 Waitangi Day event regarding the Treaty Principles Bill. Williams accused Seymour of spreading misinformation by saying Māori were "causing division and racism", a claim which Seymour denied. The exchange was met with divided opinion.

== Personal life ==
Williams previously dated the New Zealand comedian Rose Matafeo. Williams was in a relationship with former politician Golriz Ghahraman; their relationship ended in late 2020.

Williams revealed he was diagnosed with ADHD in December 2024.
