= 2020 New Zealand Radio Awards =

- Awarded for: Excellence in radio broadcasting
- Country: New Zealand
- Presented by: Radio Broadcasters Association
- Website: radioawards.co.nz

The 2020 New Zealand Radio Awards are the awards for excellence in the New Zealand radio industry during 2019. It will be the 43rd New Zealand Radio Awards, recognising staff, volunteers and contractors in both commercial and non-commercial broadcasting.

Due to the lockdown measures in place due to the COVID-19 pandemic, there was no award ceremony. Instead, the winners were announced on 15 May on the Radio Broadcasters Association's website.

== Winners and nominees ==
This is a list of nominees, with winners in bold.|

=== Associated Craft Award sponsored by RCS ===
**Associated Craft Award**

**Harry Pali - ZM Network**

- MediaWorks Trade Marketing Team - Cathy Fali, Jess Knox, Alex Kenny, Drew Pollock, Melissa Stephenson, Kat Blackburn, Megan Laxon - MediaWorks
- MediaWorks Radio Integration Team - Nikki Flint, Sunshine Moore, Sam West, Rebecca Dewhurst, Brittany Munro, Danielle Tolich, Nicki Covich, Morgan Penn, Amber Howard, Jess Smith, Larissa O'Reilly, Finlay Robertson, Abby Lawrence, Aileen Lau, Penny Quirk, Arun Beard, Kiriana Jones, Jessie Matheson, Caitlin Coffey, Jayden King, Sophie Kavanagh - MediaWorks

=== Best Community Campaign sponsored by NZME ===
**Best Community Campaign**
**The Rock's Spare Change Campaign - Bryce Casey - The Rock Network**
- No Talk Day - Mike Lane, Claire Chellew, Jeremy Wells, Matt Heath, Angelina Grey, Leigh Hart, Matt Ward, Scotty Stevenson, Greg Prebble, James McOnie, Manaia Stewart, Joseph Durie, Chris Key, Tom Harper, Joe Shuker, Zoe George, Jacki Polkinghorne, Alex Hanger, Chris Goodwin, Robert Dunne, Harry Miller - Radio Hauraki Network
- More FM Jingle Bail - Jay-Jay Feeney, Paul Flynn, Jason Gunn, George Smith, Leanne Hutchinson, Shae Osborne, Matt Anderson, Melissa Low, Talia Purser - More FM Network

=== Best Content sponsored by Radio New Zealand ===
**Best Content Director** **Matt Anderson, Amy Tempero, Christian Boston - More FM Network**: Brad King, Reagan White - The Rock Network; Will Maisey - The Breeze Network	**Best Entertainment Podcast** **The Trainee Sexologist - Morgan Penn, Sharyn Casey, Rebecca Frank, Dayna Ruka, Charlotte Hargreaves - Rova**: The Worst Sitcom Ever Made - Geoff Houtman, Glynis Stewart, Nigel McCulloch, Jeremy Veal, Adam Macaulay, Tim Watkin - RNZ National; Eating Fried Chicken in the Shower - James Nokise, Charlie Bleakley, Blair Stagpoole, Justin Gregory, Tim Watkin - RNZ National
**Best News/Current Affairs Podcast** **White Silence - Katy Gosset, Michael Wright, Alex Harmer, Jeremy Ansell, Adam Dudding, Justin Gregory, Tim Watkin, Carol Hirschfeld - RNZ National / Stuff**: The Detail - Sharon Brettkelly, Alex Ashton, Alexia Russell, Kethaki Masilamani, Tim Watkin, Mark Jennings, Tim Murphy - RNZ National; 50 Year Secret - Melissa Nightingale, Frances Cook - NZME	**Best Show Producer – Music Show** **Ben McDowell, Ellie Harwood - ZM's Bree & Clint - ZM Network**: Ryan Maguire - The Morning Rumble - The Rock Network; Jeremy Pickford - The Rock Drive Home with Jay and Dunc - The Rock Network
**Best Show Producer – Talk Show** **Pip Keane, Catherine Walbridge, Bridget Burke - Checkpoint - RNZ National**: Dan Goodwin - Marcus Lush Nights - Newstalk ZB Network; Michael Allan - The Mike Hosking Breakfast - Newstalk ZB Network	**Best Station Imaging** **Alistair Cockburn, Brynee Wilson - ZM Network**: Grant Brodie - The Edge Network; Joe Baxendale - The Rock Network
**Best Station Trailer** **ZM's Bonus Banger - Alistair Cockburn - ZM Network**: Karen - Brad Watson, Grant Brodie - The Edge Network; ZM's Secret Sound - Alistair Cockburn - ZM Network	**Best Video** **Beer & Pie July - Claire Chellew, Chris Campbell, Tom Harper, Matt Heath, Jeremy Wells, Angelina Grey, Greg Prebble, Matt Ward, Manaia Stewart, Leigh Hart, Chris Key, Joseph Durie, Allan George, Josh Todd, Haley Robertson, Pepe De Hoyos - Radio Hauraki Network**: The Rock 1500 Killer Countdown - Roger Farrelly, Bryce Casey, Andrew Mulligan, Jim Cawthorn, Jennifer Glamuzina, Duncan Heyde, Jay Reeve, Mike Garvey, Grant Brodie - The Rock Network; Signature Series - Aaron Ly, Stacey Wouters, Claire Chellew, Chris Campbell, Jeremy Wells, Matt Heath, Angelina Grey, Joseph Durie, Allan George, Josh Todd, Pepe De Hoyos, Haley Robertson - Radio Hauraki Network

=== Best Hosts ===
**Best Breakfast Show – Music Network** **ZM's Fletch, Vaughan & Megan - Carl Fletcher, Vaughan Smith, Megan Papas, Caitlin Marett, James Johnston, Anna Henvest - ZM Network**: The Edge Breakfast with Dom, Meg and Randell - Dom Harvey, Meg Annear, Clinton Randell, Alexandra Mullin, Melissa Moore, Chang Hung, Hamish Phipps, Jerome Sears - The Edge Network; The Morning Rumble - Roger Farrelly, Andrew Mulligan, Bryce Casey, Ryan Maguire - The Rock Network	**Best Host - Music Network** **Robert Scott - The Breeze Network Drive Show - The Breeze Network**: Estelle Clifford - Nights With Estelle Clifford - The Hits Network; Tracey Donaldson - Weekdays with Tracey - The Mix Network
**Best Team Show - Music Network** **The Rock Drive Home with Jay and Dunc - Jay Reeve, Duncan Heyde, Jeremy Pickford, Jack Honeybone - The Rock Network**: ZM's Bree & Clint - Bree Tomasel, Clint Roberts, Ben McDowell, Ellie Harwood - ZM Network; Jay-Jay, Flynny & Jase - Jay-Jay Feeney, Paul Flynn, Jason Gunn, George Smith, Christian Boston, Matt Anderson - More FM Network	**Best Music Breakfast Show - Local** **Callum & P - Callum Procter, Patrina Roche - The Hits Dunedin/Southland**: John, Flash and Toast - John Markby, Angela Gordon, Tauha TeKani - More FM Northland; Steve & Kath - Steve Joll, Kath Bier - The Breeze Wellington
**Best Music Host - Local** **Will Johnston - Days with Will Johnston - The Hits Bay Of Plenty**: Tasha Knox - More FM Workplace Social Club - More FM Marlborough; Sue White - The Breeze Work Day with Sue White - The Breeze Canterbury	**Best Music Host or Team - Non Surveyed Market** **Brent Burridge & Jacque Tucker - Breakfast with Brent and Jacque - More FM Rodney**: Andrew Leiataua - Andrew Leiataua Breakfast Show - More FM Taupo; Joel and Lauren - More FM Breakfast with Joel and Lauren - More FM Queenstown, Wanaka & Central Otago
**Best Talk Presenter - Breakfast or Drive** **Mike Hosking - The Mike Hosking Breakfast - Newstalk ZB Network**: Heather du Plessis-Allan - Heather du Plessis-Allan Drive - Newstalk ZB Network; Lisa Owen - Checkpoint - RNZ National	**Best Talk Presenter - Other** **Marcus Lush - Marcus Lush Nights - Newstalk ZB Network**: Kathryn Ryan - Nine to Noon - RNZ National; Martin Devlin - The Devlin Radio Show - Newstalk ZB & Radio Sport Networks

=== Best New Broadcaster sponsored by Ara NZ Broadcasting School ===
**Best New Broadcaster - Journalist** **Katie Scotcher - RNZ National**: Anneke Smith - RNZ National; Rachel Das - Newstalk ZB Network; Ben Strang - RNZ National	**Best New Broadcaster – Off-Air** **Juliet Wrathall - The Hits Network**: Brynee Wilson - ZM Network; Hamish Nixon - MediaWorks Auckland
**Best New Broadcaster – On-Air** **Tegan Yorwarth - Mai FM Network** **Petra Ashcroft - ZM Network**: Azura Lane - Flava Network	

=== Best News & Sport ===
**Best News or Sports Journalist** **Guyon Espiner - RNZ National**: Logan Church - RNZ National; Mitchell Alexander - Magic Talk & Affiliates	**Best News Story – Team Coverage** **Terror in Christchurch - Newshub Radio Team News & Programmes - Magic Talk & Affiliates**: Whakaari White Island - Newshub Radio Team News & Programmes - Magic Talk & Affiliates; Christchurch Terror Attacks - RNZ News Team - RNZ National
**Best Newsreader** **Niva Retimanu - Newstalk ZB Network**: Paul Brennan - RNZ National; Raylene Ramsay - Newstalk ZB Network	**Best Sports Reader, Presenter or Commentator** **Martin Devlin - The Devlin Radio Show - Newstalk ZB & Radio Sport Networks**: Jason Pine - Radio Sport Mornings with Jason Pine - Radio Sport Network; Bryan Waddle - Radio Sport Network
**Best Sports Story – Team Coverage** **Cricket World Cup 2019 - Radio Sport Team - Radio Sport**: Rugby World Cup 2019 - Newstalk ZB & Radio Sport Teams - Newstalk ZB & Radio Sport; No Sleep Til Victory - The ACC's Cricket World Cup Final Coverage - Joseph Durie, Tom Harper, Joe Shuker, Paul Ford, Matt Heath, Jason Hoyte, Scotty Stevenson, Leigh Hart, James McOnie, Mike Lane, Jeremy Wells - The ACC Network	

=== Best Programmes sponsored by NZ On Air ===
**Best Access Radio Programme** **After March 15 - Nicki Reece, Lana Hart - Plains FM**: Migrant Journeys - Michael Wilson, Adrienne Jansen, Sokun Chiv, Lepou Suia Tuiavii-Tuulua, Helmi Al Khattat, Nena Stojkov, Sukhdev Singh Bains, Liz Grant - Arrow FM; Heritage Matters - Bill Southworth, Dougal Stevenson, Ann Barrowclough, Gregor Campbell Otago - Access Radio	**Best Children's Programme** **Moe Makes Music - Briar Coleman, Jeremy Dillon, Adam Macaulay - RNZ National**: Ali & Gab - A Tiki Tour Through Time Suzy Cato, Phil Yule, Brad Hemingway, Riley Booth, Morgan Booth, Trevor Plant Treehut Limited; The Crazy Kiwi Christmas Kids Show - Phil Guyan, Grace Bucknell, Bjorn Brickell, Leanna Cooper, Eden Bloore, Daryl Habraken, Phil Yule, Chris Newbold, Erin Carpenter, Julia Bloore, Jacinda Ardern, Mike Hosking, Jack Tame, Rachel Smalley, Pippa Wetzel - Newstalk ZB
**Best Daily or Weekly Feature - Factual** **Insight - Philippa Tolley - RNZ National**: Our Changing World - Alison Ballance - RNZ National; Mediawatch - Colin Peacock - RNZ National	**Best Documentary or Factual Talk Feature** **White Silence - Katy Gosset, Michael Wright - RNZ National and Stuff**: Insight - Domestic Violence - Kim Griggs - RNZ National; Black Sheep - The Story of White Supremacy - William Ray - RNZ National
**Best Music Feature** **The Rock 1500 - Brad King, Reagan White - The Rock Network**: ZM's Top 250 Friday Jams - Brynee Wilson - ZM Network; ROCKTOBER - Mike Lane, Greg Prebble - Radio Hauraki Network	

=== Best Promotion ===
**Best Client Promotion/Activation** **ZM's Float with Tip Top Trumpet - ZM Network Team - ZM Network**: Jono, Ben & Sharyn's 24 Hour Interview with V Sugarfree Berry - The Edge Network - Team The Edge; Dulux - Hauraki Network Team - Radio Hauraki Network	**Best Marketing Campaign** **RNZ National - Stephen Smith, Nick Campbell - RNZ National**: Bryce Casey's Spare Change - Stacey Wouters - The Rock Network; Find Your Voice - Emily Hancox - NZME National
**Best Network Station Promotion** **The Edge Celebrity Safe House - Caitlin Coffey, Dena Roberts, Bex Dewhurst, Finlay Robertson, Samuel Fullick, Ricky Bannister, Hamish Phipps, Arun Beard, Grant Brodie, Brad Watson, Sean Hill, Haylee Clarke, Guy Mansell - The Edge Network**: ZM's Friday Jams Live - ZM Network Team - ZM Network; Marry Your Mate's Mum - Dena Roberts, Sara Pilkington, Caitlin Coffey - The Edge Network	**Best Single Market Station Promotion** **Cranzacs - Jay Harvie, Hale Speedy - The Breeze Wellington**: Christchurch Children's Ward Appeal - Ruby Bain, Felixe O'Keefe - Newstalk ZB Christchurch; Ten Pine Baubling - Mitchell Fulton - The Edge Canterbury; The Breeze Gull Bingo - Grace Rhynd, Alisha Birrell - The Breeze Auckland; More FM & Placemakers 'Kids Day Out' - Jess Taylor - More FM Canterbury
**Best Website and Social Content** **The Edge Network - Ricky Bannister, Jerome Sears, Lucy Carthew, Samuel Fullick - The Edge Network**: Bryce Casey's Spare Change - Digital Campaign Michael Baker, Jack Honeybone, Dave Kavermann, Bryce Casey - The Rock Network; Rock 1500 - Michael Baker, Jack Honeybone, Dave Kavermann - The Rock Network; The Edge Breakfast with Dom, Meg & Randell - Samuel Fullick, Jerome Sears, Cate Owen - The Edge Network	

=== Best Radio Creative sponsored by The Radio Bureau ===
**Best Commercial Campaign** **Crackerjack Campaign - Ralph Van Dijk - The Edge, The Breeze, More FM, Mai FM, The Rock, The Sound, Magic Radio**: World Moving and Storage - Move The Jingle - Rew Shearer - Newstalk ZB & Radio Sport Networks; Break Away Realty - Scott Armstrong - The Hits & ZM Waikato	**Best Commercial Production** **NRC - 12 Days - Chris Hurring, Alastair Barran - The Rock Northland**: Road Safe - Ben French - The Edge & Mai Northland; NRC - Eyes Off Your Phone - Chris Hurring, Alastair Barran - The Rock & The Edge Northland
**Best Single Commercial** **Fetal Alcohol Syndrome "Drinking Pregnant" - Chris Hurring, Alastair Barran - Mai FM Hawkes Bay**: NDHB - Roadsafe - Becky Umbers, Alastair Barran - Edge & Mai Northland; NRC - Eyes Off Your Music - Chris Hurring, Alastair Barran - More FM Northland	**Best Voice Talent** **Andy George - More FM Coromandel**: Richie Simpson - ZM Network; Paul Corbett - MediaWorks Network

=== Sales Team of the Year sponsored by MediaWorks ===
**Sales Team of the Year**
**The Radio Bureau - Peter Richardson, Fraser McGregor, Jane Hitchfield, Karen McPherson, Tom Raybould, Michael Matthews, Kenneth D'Souza, Jess Collins, Ellen-Marie Atkinson, Julie Cannon, Hannah Bourke, Liam Edkins, Bianca Deyzel, Ryan Williams, Siobhan Cuthill, Sheridan Hill - The Radio Bureau**
- iHeartRadio - Andy Taylor - iHeartRadio Network
- Mediaworks Whanganui - Christina Emery, Sue Fothergill, Rahul Gujral - MediaWorks Whanganui
- NZME Auckland - Ellyn Ricketts, Claire Chisholm, Steve Keats, Jenny Craig, Olivia Brown, Jayne Powell, Sam McSkimming, Vidya Behere, Catherine Ribiere, Jon Reeves - NZME Auckland

=== Station of the Year sponsored by GfK ===
**Station of the Year – Network** **More FM - Matt Anderson, Christian Boston - More FM Network** **The Breeze - Will Maisey - The Breeze Network**: ZM - Ross Flahive - ZM Network	**Station of the Year - Non-Network** **Radio 1XX - Glenn Smith - Radio 1XX**: The Breeze Canterbury - Steve Broad, Rob McDonald, Will Maisey - The Breeze Canterbury; More FM Northland - Erena Miller, Tarsh Ieremia, Jemma Randell - More FM Northland

=== 'The Blackie Award' ===
'**The Blackie Award'**
**The Morning Rumble - Bryce Casey's 58 Hours Ten Pin Bowling - Bryce Casey, Andrew Mulligan, Roger Farrelly, Ryan Maguire - The Rock Network**
- Marcus Gets Locked Out - Marcus Lush, Andy Duff, Dan Goodwin - Newstalk ZB Network
- The Rock Drive Home with Jay and Dunc - Poo Towns of Papakura - Jeremy Pickford, Jay Reeve, Duncan Heyde, Jack Honeybone - The Rock Network

=== The Johnny Douglas Award ===
**The Johnny Douglas Award**
**Waimirirangi Lee-Reiri - The Pulse**
- Bailey Palala - Static 88.1
- Andrew Newman - The Pulse

=== Sir Paul Holmes Broadcaster of the Year ===
**Outstanding Contribution to Radio**

**Bryce Casey**

=== Outstanding Contribution to Radio ===
**Outstanding Contribution to Radio**

**Dean Buchanan**

**Glenn Smith**

=== Services to Broadcasting ===
**Services to Broadcasting**

**Raylene Ramsay**

**Nicki Reece**

**Murray Lindsay**

**Barry McConnachie**
