= Jono and Ben =

Satirical news and entertainment show

- Written by: Jono Pryor; Guy Williams; Ben Boyce; Steve Wrigley (series 1); Jesse Mulligan (series 1); Nic Sampson (series 2-3); Joseph Moore (series 2-3); Jamie Linehan (series 3); Jeremy Lawry (series 3); Rose Matafeo (series 3); Jamaine Ross (series 3); Sam Smith (series 3)
- Directed by: Andy Robinson; Damon Fepulea'i (series 1 & 3); Helena Brooks (series 2); Oliver Jones (series 2); Jordan Watson (series 3)
- Presented by: Jono Pryor; Ben Boyce
- Starring: Guy Williams (supporting role in series 1; co-host from series 2 onwards); Laura Daniel (series 5 onwards); Rose Matafeo (series 2–4)
- Narrated by: Guy Williams (intro only)
- Theme music composer: Franklin Rd
- Country of origin: New Zealand
- Original language: English
- No. of seasons: 7
- No. of episodes: 183 (list of episodes)

Production
- Executive producer: John McDonald
- Producers: Ben Boyce; Bronwynn Wilson
- Production locations: 8 Lion Place, Epsom, Auckland
- Editors: Jamie Linehan; Jamaine Ross; Andy Deere; Karlie Fisher; Andy Robinson; Damon Fepulea'i; Ben Frost
- Running time: 44 minutes
- Production company: MediaWorks New Zealand

Original release
- Network: Three
- Release: July 13, 2012 – November 15, 2018

Related
- New Zealand Today; WANNA-BEn

Jono and Ben, previously titled Jono and Ben at Ten, is a satirical news and entertainment show hosted by Jono Pryor and Ben Boyce in New Zealand. The show aired on Three on Thursday nights at 7:30pm, and was filmed the night before in their studios in Epsom. The show combined pre-filmed comedy sketches, pranks and parodies, linked together by segments filmed in front of a small studio audience. A third presenter, Guy Williams sat in a chair to the right of the stage and provided comic foil for the hosts. In 2015 the show moved from 10pm to 7:30pm and was extended to run for an hour; due to the timeslot change, the show was renamed Jono and Ben.

In 2017 the show moved to Thursday nights and started broadcasting live (with prerecorded segments and sketches). The show was cancelled during its seventh season, marking the end to its seven year run.

From 2014 to 2016, they hosted The Rock's drive show, and from 2017 to 2019, they cohosted The Edge's drive show with Sharyn Casey.

In 2020, the duo began hosting the networked breakfast show on The Hits.

== Show history ==
The show began in 2012, bringing together presenters from two previous TV3 shows. Jono Pryor was previously the host of The Jono Project, which ran from 2008–2011, while Ben Boyce was one-half of the popular long-running series Pulp Sport and his own series, WANNA-BEn. Jono and Ben at Ten combines elements from both hosts' former shows, including the topical media satire of The Jono Project and hidden camera stunts involving the public that Pulp Sport was famous for.

While the show is hosted by and named after Jono Pryor and Ben Boyce, Guy Williams has been the third chair since the beginning (having crossed from The Jono Project to Jono and Ben at Ten). Series 2 saw him move from being credited as a guest appearance to co-host. In November 2013, Jono and Ben announced they will have a second co-host, comedian and former children's show presenter, Rose Matafeo.

The first series' finale, which aired 30 November 2012, was a double length episode and aired at the earlier time of 9.30pm.

Jono and Ben at Ten quickly became a top rating show for TV3. New Zealand Herald TV blogger Paul Casserly named it in his Top 5 Comedies of 2012, while stuff.co.nz reviewer Chris Philpot named the show in his Top 10 shows of 2012. Jono and Ben at Ten was also nominated for Best Comedy Show in the TV Guide Best On The Box Awards. Pryor and Boyce were also nominated for the Funniest Person on TV.

On 13 August 2013, it was announced on Jono and Ben at Ten's official Facebook page, that the show would return for a third series in 2014 and that TV3 and New Zealand on Air have increased the episodes to 26 episodes. The official announcement came on 24 October 2013, when MediaWorks released their full renewals.

On 21 February 2014, the third series of the show began airing (alongside 7 Days) which was a change from previous series which started in late May/early June. Since 2006 Jono has hosted the drive show on The Rock radio station originally alongside Robert Taylor. With Robert leaving in early 2014 a decision was made to place Ben as Jono's new radio co-host. The show on The Rock is hosted as an extension of the TV show. In 2014, Boyce joined Pryor on The Rock radio station to host the weekday afternoon show from 3 to 7pm. They brought out hip hop star from the 90s Vanilla Ice to do the Vanilla Ice Bucket Challenge—dump two truckloads of ice water over them. Afterward Jono and Ben got Vanilla Ice to play a sold out concert.

On 18 February 2015, it was announced that the fourth series of the show will be renamed Jono and Ben and air at the earlier time of 7:30pm on Fridays. The show would also be extended to air for an hour instead of the previous half an hour. From 2015 the show is presented from a much larger studio with Guy Williams sitting almost next to Jono and Ben; this studio was used for the final episode in 2014 which coincided with the TV3 25-year anniversary. In 2015, Boyce and Pryor both released their own limited edition Jono and Ben V Energy Drinks. The promotion put Jono and Ben against each other with their own separate flavours and a competition to be the most popular. In September 2015, Jono and Ben sailed a children's bouncy castle across Lake Taupo in Central New Zealand. The journey was 40 km and took almost ten hours.

On 23 March 2017, the show aired footage of Jono Pryor accidentally crashing the backhoe of an excavator into the front of Ben Boyce's house while digging a pool. Some fans have shown speculation as to whether or not the accident was staged, as the house was shortly due for renovation.

The show aired its final episode on 15 November 2018.

In 2019, New Zealand Today, a segment on the show, was expanded into an 8-episode show hosted by Guy Williams.

== Segments ==
The following segments are seen on the former Jono and Ben at Ten / Jono and Ben.

=== Action men ===
Jono and Ben take part in a challenge out in public. Challenges have ranged from trying to sneakily place items into customers supermarket trolleys, seeing what objects people will hold if distracted by a phone conversation, placing red noses on people during Red Nose Day and trying to race 400 metres around town without touching the ground. The challenge sees Jono and Ben compete against each other, often watching and commentating on the other's efforts.

=== Breaking Brad ===
Introduced in the fourth series, Jono and Ben play a prank on The Rock station manager, Brad King. Pranks so far have included Jono and Ben building a wall over the entrance of Brad's office and playing music from Stan Walker on The Rock which falls outside The Rock format.

=== BSA censorship ===
Jono and Ben's attempt to clean up the "smut" on New Zealand TV. Clips from a recent news story, advertisement or TV show are shown but certain ordinary words are bleeped out leading the viewer to believe the presenter said a swear word at that point, which in turn changes the context of dialogue. This segment is similar to Jimmy Kimmel's "Unnecessary Censorship" portion of his show.

=== Cool Story Bro ===
A celebrity will tell a story. While the celebrity tells this story Jono, Ben and the rest of the team will act out this story.

=== Pick Up Only ===
Jono and Ben list an item for sale in a classified advert or through Trade Me with the requirement the purchaser must pick the item up. The purchaser is then sent to a house where actors are in place and the unsuspecting purchaser will end up entering the house and walking in on an awkward situation such as a nude couple.

=== Jono versus Ben ===
Each week Jono and Ben compete in a parody sketch competition on a certain topic, for example Medical Dramas, Kids Shows, Blockbuster movies. Within the show, each of them present a parody video they have made, and afterward, both videos are posted on the show's Facebook page, where viewers are asked to vote for their preferred video by "Liking" the video on Facebook. The video with the least likes is considered the loser and the following week the loser is punished in the final segment of the show "Sux to Be." This segment was not included in the third season but the "Sux to Be" was retained.

=== Making Shapes ===
Introduced in the Fifth Series, Making Shapes is a game where two contestants go through a hole without falling into water. The two contestants will win $500 and a years supply of Arnott's Shapes. This segment is somewhat similar to Hole in the Wall.

=== Sux to Be... ===
"Sux to Be" is screened at the end of each episode. Each week a prank is played on either Jono, Ben, Guy or Rose. The victim of "Sux to Be" is usually the person who lost the "Jono versus Ben" segment of the show—usually Jono or Ben, although on one occasion Jono and Ben decided the result was a draw and made Guy Williams the victim. In the third season the "Jono versus Ben" segment was dropped and instead the recipient was chosen randomly or in some cases viewers could vote through the Jono and Ben Facebook page. The pranks have varied from week to week and have usually resulted in a prize possession being destroyed such as Ben's car and flat screen TV. Jono's Holden Kingswood has also been the target of many pranks pulled by Ben including having Ben fire golf balls at the car and even having the black car painted pink. Some weeks Guy has also played pranks on both Jono and Ben.

=== NeXt Actor ===
The naming of this segment parodies the TV series The X Factor. Introduced in the second series, Jono and Ben send a celebrity into a store posing as a staff member. The actor is dressed in the company uniform and will try to help unsuspecting customers. The actor is wearing a handsfree mobile device with an earpiece, and Jono and Ben give the actor instructions from a remote room. Jono and Ben will ask the actor to make inappropriate comments or do inappropriate actions in front of the customer. This segment has proven to be one of the most popular, one particular episode featuring Robbie Magasiva reaching over one million views on YouTube. while another featuring Ben Barrington has become an Internet meme.

=== YouDoTube ===
Each week a celebrity is brought on YouDoTube and shown a popular YouTube clip of a person doing a strange challenge. The celebrity is then given the challenge to do later in the show, act out the clip and achieve the same result as the clip. A member of the audience is chosen and if the celebrity successfully completes the challenge the member of the audience wins $500.

=== Speed Dating ===
While originally debuting in the second series, the Speed Dating segment appears sporadically in the third and fourth series. The segment has Rose Matafeo conducting interviews in the form of speed dates with New Zealand and international celebrities. Rose tends to ask the speed dater questions which tend towards the inappropriate and innuendo.

=== Straight to the Sauce ===
In Straight to the Sauce, Jono and Ben interview actors portraying people that have been involved in the media recently.

== Retired segments ==
=== The Changing Room ===
Seen for the first few weeks of the first series of Jono and Ben, the Changing Room segment normally starts with Jono and Ben talking about what happened on the TV3 show The Block NZ and often mocking scenes on the show. Jono and Ben then start their version of The Block called The Changing Room. The starting sequence of The Changing Room is a parody of The Block opening credits. The actual Changing Room segment takes place in a Mr Vintage clothing store in Auckland. An unsuspecting customer asks to try on an item of clothing and while trying on the garment, the crew will put up four temporary walls around the changing room entrance and create a scene such as a funeral, wedding or locker room. When the customer exits the changing room he or she will walk into this room often very confused. This segment is normally played out on several customers. At the conclusion of the first series of The Block, Jono and Ben decided to discontinue this segment, however, a week later they both decided to make the show's presenter Mark Richardson the victim. Jono and Ben, with the help of The Block winning team Libby and Ben, entered Richardson's house and changed a room in his house to a Shane Warne cricket theme, as he and Richardson had a rivalry. A variation of this segment was played out in the second series where a room was set up in front of the opening of a lift in a public car park.

=== Old News ===
News stories from the past week are made to look like a news story from the 1960s or earlier, with the story shown in black and white and the picture quality degraded. The sound is replaced with a voice over using the same tone used in 1960s TV news with the voice over often having nothing related to the news story.

=== Guy Williams Television Segment ===
The show's third presenter, Guy Williams, is usually sent out by Jono and Ben to report on a big event from the week. Williams will do his best to interview those at the event often causing a humiliating scene for Guy Williams. One notable prank, in the first series, was when Guy refused to interview Justin Bieber because he thought it was a joke, leaving Bieber waiting in the interview chair for over half an hour. Sometimes Jono and Ben will prank Williams during this segment. During one of Guy's stand-up comedy shows, Jono and Ben came on stage before Williams and held up signs asking the audience not to laugh at any of Guy's jokes. This segment was retired in the second half of the second series, however; Guy is still often sent out to do various interviews.

=== The Man Childs ===
Each week, Jono and Ben send ten-year-old boy versions of themselves (dubbed "the Man Childs" and played by Nathan Bevan and Frankie O'Halloran) to do the celebrity interviews. The Man Childs are dressed to look like a younger version of Jono and Ben and ask cheeky questions written by Jono and Ben. This segment is similar to the sketch on British sketch show, Ant & Dec's Saturday Night Takeaway. The Man Childs' interviewees have included English singer Natalia Kills, All Black Ali Williams, actress Anna Hutchison, boy band The Wanted and socialites Sally and Jaime Ridge. At the end of the first series, a "Little Guy" (played by Jamie Christmas) was introduced, and accompanies his adult counterpart, Guy Williams, on several assignments. The theme music played during this segment is "Chicken Man" by Alan Hawkshaw, more well-known as the theme song of Grange Hill.

=== Guy Williams Hunger Fails ===
Seen towards the end of the second season, Guy Williams would show three clips from television or the Internet where a person has failed, such as a clip of a soccer player scoring a goal in their own goal post. The first two are often overseas clips but the third and winning clip will be a New Zealand clip. Guy will then locate the person in the clip and present them with the award, often trying to re-enact the clip and Guy ending up in an embarrassing situation. The segment did not return in 2014.

=== Pick a Laugh ===
Jono, Ben and the rest of the show crew act out a scene and at the climax the segment ends. Viewers are then asked to post on the show Facebook page how they want the story to continue. One viewer's suggestion will then be played out the next week. The name of the segment Pick a Laugh is a reference to the Pick a Path Gamebook series where the reader chooses what happens next by turning to a specific page.

=== Sh*t Nobody Says ===
Introduced in the second series, this segment is played just before the show's first or second advertisement break. Each week a theme is picked and Jono and Ben will run through comments people would likely never say when it came to that theme. For example, one week the theme was "Living in Auckland", and comments were made such as "Man, house prices are cheap here". (Note: At the time of filming, Auckland had the highest median house price in New Zealand.) The segment normally features a television show or a recent event, cutting between Jono, Ben and Guy each making a comment.
