= Megan Mansell =

New Zealand broadcaster

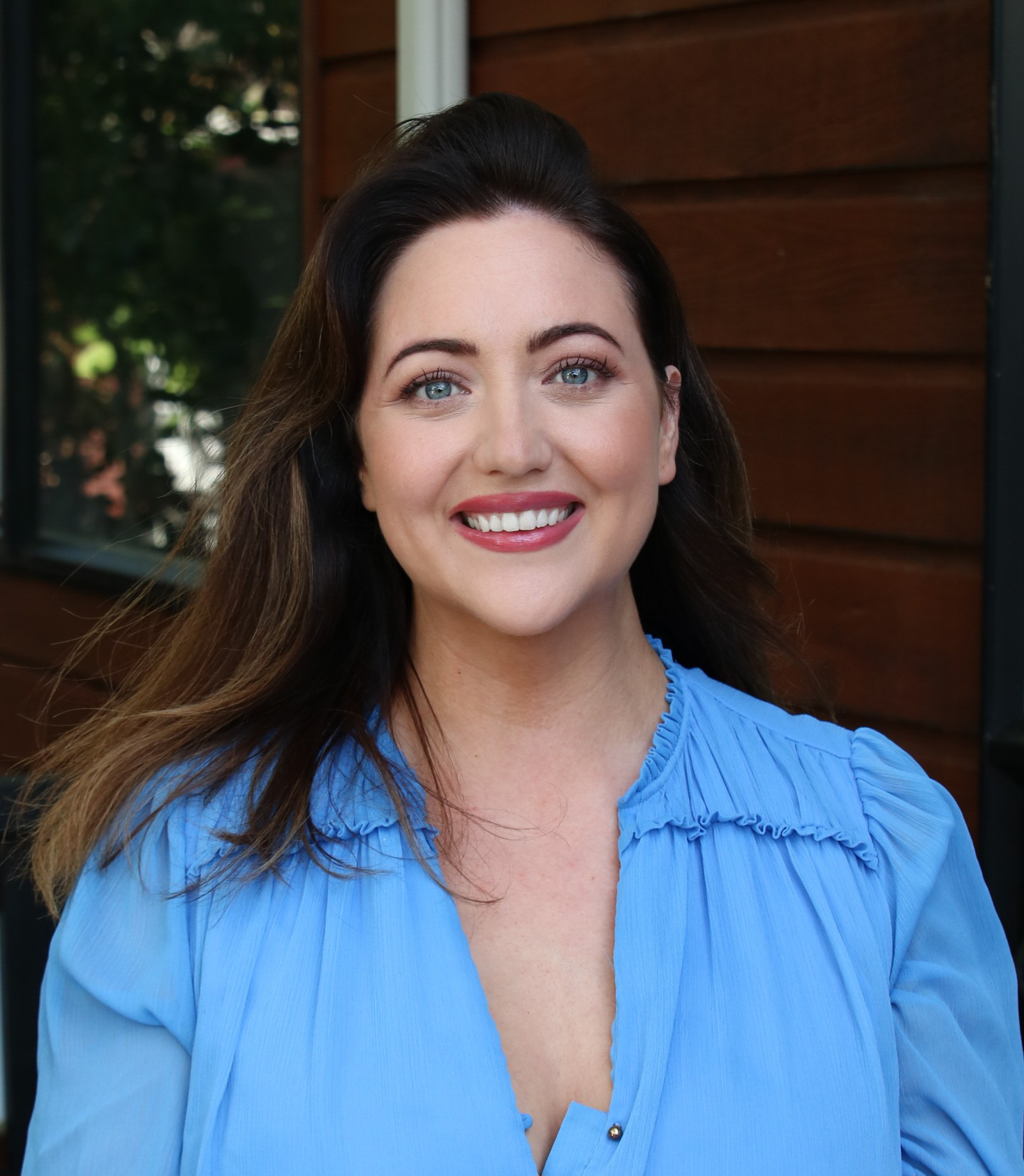
- Born: Megan Annear; 24 July 1990 (age 36)
- Spouse: Guy Mansell (m. 2020)
- Children: 2
- Presenting career
- Show: The Edge Breakfast with Clint, Meg & Dan
- Station: The Edge
- Network: MediaWorks New Zealand
- Time slot: 6 am – 10 am
- Country: New Zealand

Megan Mansell (née Annear; born 24 July 1990) is a New Zealand broadcaster. She is a co-host on The Edge Breakfast with Clint, Meg & Dan.

== Early life ==
Mansell was born on 24 July 1990 in Lower Hutt. She studied at the New Zealand Broadcasting School at Ara Institute of Canterbury, in Christchurch, New Zealand.

== Career ==
Mansell started her radio career co-hosting the breakfast show on Classic Hits in Queenstown. In 2013, she began hosting The Edge Workdays of Awesome on radio station The Edge. In late 2017, she became a co-host of The Edge Breakfast with Dom, Meg & Randell, with Dom Harvey and Clint Randell. In the 2020 New Zealand Radio Awards her team of breakfast hosts were finalists for Best Breakfast Show – Music Network. Harvey left the show in July 2021, leading to a change in the show to The Edge Breakfast with Meg & Randell, then The Edge Breakfast with Nickson, Meg & Eli in 2022, and The Edge Breakfast with Clint, Meg & Dan in 2023.

In 2016, she launched a YouTube channel focusing on fashion and beauty, and in 2019 she received the Supreme Award for Influencer of the Year from fashion magazine Miss FQ.

== Personal life ==
In 2018, she became engaged to co-worker Guy Mansell, and they married on 21 March 2020. They have two children.
