= The Edge (New Zealand radio station) =

New Zealand radio station

- New Zealand
- Frequencies: See list

Programming
- Format: Pop music

Ownership
- Owner: MediaWorks New Zealand

History
- First air date: 8 August 1994

Links
- Webcast: Live stream
- Website: Official website

The Edge is a youth-oriented New Zealand entertainment brand consisting of a national radio network and an entertainment website. It is owned and operated by MediaWorks New Zealand. Streaming on the app Rova live 24\7. It previously had a TV channel, The Edge TV.

The station was founded in Hamilton in 1994 and is now based in Auckland; it broadcasts nationwide over multiple channels. Research International audience surveys suggest The Edge has approximately 581,200 listeners across all markets that are surveyed and the station makes up 7.0% of the New Zealand radio market.

The network is most successful in Waikato, Rotorua and Nelson surveys and in the 15–19 and 10–14 female demographics, whereas rival station ZM is most popular with listeners aged between 20 and 34. The station's breakfast programme is number two in the ratings for nationwide commercial breakfast radio; its 240,000 listeners compare with 325,600 listeners for the top-rating Newstalk ZB. This compares with the non-commercial RNZ National whose breakfast programme, Morning Report, has an audience of 522,000 listeners.

== History ==
=== Early years ===
In 1994 both Buzzard 98FM, The Rock 93FM and The Rock 100FM in Taranaki were sold to the Taranaki-based company Energy Enterprises which operated Energy FM in the area. Buzzard 98FM was rebranded as The Edge 97.8FM and switched to a Top 40 format, first airing on 8 August 1994. Initially broadcasting from studios in Hamilton, the station was relocated to Auckland in 2001, although no frequency was available there until 2003.

=== The Edge TV ===
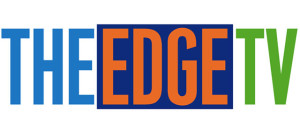
The Edge TV logo used from its launch in 2014 until the station rebrand in 2016.

The Edge TV was the brand's TV channel. It was launched on 27 June 2014 as a replacement of C4, and airs music videos, specialist music and pop culture shows and original video content filmed with The Edge radio hosts. It is available free-to-air on Kordia digital terrestrial and Sky satellite services, as well as online. On 1 July 2019, it moved to online only, with its terrestrial broadcast element being replaced by ThreeLife + 1. It returned to terrestrial broadcast on 26 March 2020, replacing ThreeLife. In September 2020, MediaWorks sold the TV portion of its business including Edge TV to Discovery, Inc.

== Programs ==
=== Breakfast ===
The Edge Breakfast with Clint, Meg & Dan, hosted by Clint Randell, Megan Mansell and Dan Webby, is The Edge's flagship breakfast programme which airs 6 am–10 am, Monday–Friday. They are joined by producers Carl and Neps. A podcast of the show is produced and released on Rova, and other podcast platforms. Previous hosts of The Edge's breakfast show include Nickson Clark, Eli Matthewson, Dom Harvey, Jay-Jay Feeney, Mike Puru, Jason Reeves, Martin Devlin, Malcolm Paul, Brian "Butt Ugly Bob" Reid, and Jesse Mulligan.

=== Workdays ===
The Edge Workdays airs 10 am–3 pm, Monday–Friday and is hosted by Lucy Maynard. Previous hosts of The Edge's days show include Cal Payne, Yasmina Coe, Sean Hill, Sophie Nathan, Steph Monks, Sarah Gandy, Guy Mansell, Sam Robertson, Megan Mansell, Sharyn Casey, Megan Sellers, Clint Roberts, Joe Cotton, Angelina Boyd, Tarsh Tolson, and Jay-Jay Feeney.

=== Afternoons ===
The Edge Arvo Show airs 3 pm–7 pm, Monday–Friday and is hosted by Cal Payne, Yasmina Coe and Harrison Keefe, with producer Sam. Previous hosts of The Edge's drive show include Ash London, Steph Monks, Sean Hill, Sharyn Casey, Nickson Clark, Jayden King, Jono Pryor, Ben Boyce, Guy Williams, Clint Roberts, Carl "Fletch" Fletcher, Vaughan Smith, Megan Sellers, Chang Hung, Alex Behan, Iain Stables, Blair Dowling, Jason Reeves, Jay-Jay Feeney, and Brian "Butt Ugly Bob" Reid.

=== Nights ===
The Edge Nights airs 7 pm–12 am, Monday–Friday, and is hosted by Ollie Miles. The show is host to The Edge Top 20 as voted for by listeners each night at 8 pm. In 2020, a second chart, the TikTok Top 10 was introduced. These charts replaced the Nightly Nineteen that featured in 2019. Prior to 2019, the show was named The Edge 30, The Edge Nightshow and Smash! 20. Previous hosts of The Edge's night show include Lucy Maynard, Cal Payne, Sean Hill, Sophie Nathan, Haylee Clarke, Marty Heheworth, Steph Monks, Guy Mansell, Sam Robertson, Brad Watson, Sharyn Casey, Carolyn Taylor, and Mike Puru.

=== Weekends ===
The Edge Bottomless Brunch airs 6–10 am on Saturday and is presented by The Edge Nights host Cal Payne and The Edge Workdays host Yasmina Coe.

Prior to The Edge Mix, The Edge Pre's airs Saturdays from 5-10 pm and is hosted by Brydon.

The Edge Mix airs Saturdays from 10 pm–2am and is an advertisement-free show with songs mixed by DJ Sean Hill. Over the summer of 2022/2023 it is hosted by DJ duo Jupiter Project. It was previously mixed by American electronic and dance duo The Chainsmokers, and Erika Moore.

Other weekend slots (after 10 am on Saturdays and 9 am on Sundays) are usually filled by such presenters as Fin Robertson, Raynor Perreau, Luka Campbell, Jesse Williamson, Warwick, Mel and Sean Hill.

== Promotions ==
=== Quit Your Day Job ===
Quit Your Day Job returned in November 2019 to find Jono Pryor and Ben Boyce's replacement on The Edge Afternoons with Sharyn Casey, with Pryor and Boyce leaving at the end of 2019 to go to Radio Hauraki (although they were moved to The Hits before starting at Radio Hauraki). Jayden King was successful and joined Sharyn for The Edge Afternoons with Sharyn & Jayden in January 2020.

=== Desperate Housewives vs Crazy Frog ===
Run in September 2005, in order to win $3,000, three mothers and their children had a sit in a caravan while The Crazy Frog played over and over again; in order to win the mother and her child had to stay in the caravan until Axel F from The Crazy Frog had played for 72 hours (around 3000 times). There were various complaints about this competition and CYFS actually offered to give the contestant $2,000 if she forfeited from the competition immediately.

=== Summer Jam and Edgefest ===
Every summer between 2001 and 2006, The Edge put on major concerts featuring popular bands from its playlists. Starting as Summer Jam, the concert series grew significantly over the years, featuring a steadily increasing number of international acts. The first Summer Jam took place in Hamilton, Wellington and Christchurch in 2001 and featured Zed, Stellar*, Breathe, Garageland and international act Killing Heidi. The second Summer Jam in 2002 featured Silverchair as the international act and New Zealand bands The Feelers, Tadpole, Che Fu and Rubicon.In 2003, with The Edge now broadcasting in Auckland the city became a venue alongside Hamilton, Wellington and Christchurch with Good Charlotte playing alongside Taxi Ride, Zed, Nesian Mystik, Rubicon, Carly Binding and Elemeno P.

Summer Jam was rebranded to Edgefest in 2004. Edgefest 04 was held on 6, 7, 12, and 13 March 2004 in Wellington, Christchurch, Auckland, and Hamilton respectively. It featured performances from Shihad, Alien Ant Farm and Yellowcard playing with Elemeno P, The Feelers, Scribe, Blindspott, Zed, Che Fu and the Krates, Nesian Mystik, and Steriogram. Edgefest 05 was held on 12, 13, 18, and 19 March 2005 in Auckland, Hamilton, Wellington, and Christchurch respectively. It included performances from Chingy, Blindspott, The Feelers, P-Money, Steriogram, Fast Crew, 48 May, Dei Hamo, Misfits of Science, Savage and Goodnight Nurse. Edgefest 06 was held on 23, 24, 25, and 26 March 2006 in Wellington, Christchurch, Auckland, and Hamilton respectively. It featured performances from P.O.D., Presidents of the United States of America, Mattafix, The Living End, Thirsty Merc and Elemeno P, Nesian Mystik, Frontline, Savage Feat. Aaradhna and Goodnight Nurse. The Edge Summer Jam was revived in 2009 with The Veronicas, Metro Station, P-Money, and Midnight Youth, taking place in Hamilton but not Dunedin.

== Frequencies ==
The Edge is available on FM frequencies below, and streaming via websites and apps.

=== North Island frequencies ===
North Island frequencies
Market	Location	Transmitter	Frequency	Founding
Northland	Whangārei	Maungataniwha, Hikurangi & Parahaki	94.0 FM	2002
Auckland	Auckland	Sky Tower	94.2 FM	2003
Coromandel	Whangamatā	Tirohanga Drive	93.1 FM	
Waikato	Hamilton	Ruru	97.8 FM	1994
Bay of Plenty	Tauranga	Kopukairua	88.6 FM	1997
Bay of Plenty	Whakatāne	Putauaki	104.1 FM	2016
Rotorua	Rotorua	Pukepoto	99.9 FM	1998
Taupo	Taupō	Whakaroa	88.8 FM	2000
Gisborne	Gisborne	Wheatstone Road	99.7 FM	
Hawkes Bay	Napier	Mount Erin	98.3 FM	1999
Taranaki	New Plymouth	Mount Egmont	94.0 FM	1999
Whanganui	Wanganui	Bastia Hill	88.8 FM	2013
Manawatu	Palmerston North	Wharite	93.0 FM	2000
Kapiti	Paraparaumu	Forest Heights	97.5 FM	1999
Wairarapa	Masterton	Popoiti	95.9 FM	1999
Wellington	Wellington	Haywards & Kaukau	91.7 FM	2001

=== South Island frequencies ===
South Island frequencies
Market	Location	Transmitter	Frequency	Founding
Nelson	Nelson	Grampians	88.8 FM	1999
Marlborough	Blenheim	Wither Hills	104.9 FM	2009
Canterbury	Christchurch	Sugarloaf	88.9 FM	1999
Ashburton	Ashburton	Electricity Ashburton	93.3 FM	
South Canterbury	Timaru	Mt Horrible	95.5 FM	
North Otago	Oamaru	Cape Wanbrow	96.0 FM	
Otago	Dunedin	Mount Cargill	91.8 FM	1999
Queenstown	Wānaka	Mt Maude	98.6 FM	
Queenstown	Queenstown	Peninsula Hill	95.2 FM	2000
Queenstown	Alexandra	Obelisk	88.7 FM	
Southland	Invercargill	Hedgehope	97.2 FM	1999

== Controversy ==
=== Broadcasting standards breaches ===
In February 2008, the Broadcasting Standards Authority (BSA) upheld a complaint against The Edge for breaching the standard of social responsibility after its hosts prank called the National Poison Centre during a live radio segment in August 2007. The hosts falsely claimed that someone had ingested glass cleaner and sought medical advice—despite knowing the liquid was an energy drink—purely for entertainment. The BSA found the prank wasted the Centre’s time and resources, risked encouraging copycat calls, and presented the stunt as humorous to an impressionable young audience. The Authority ordered RadioWorks to broadcast a statement summarising the decision.

In February 2009, the BSA upheld a complaint against The Edge for breaching privacy and fairness standards after its hosts aired a listener’s mobile phone number without consent during a live call. The listener had contacted the station to raise concerns about xenophobic comments, and was falsely assured she was not on air. Her number was broadcast anyway, leading to a barrage of abusive texts. Although the broadcaster upheld the complaint and reprimanded the host, the BSA found its response inadequate, noting the seriousness of the breach and its recurrence in the same programme. The Authority ordered RadioWorks to pay $1,500 in compensation to the complainant.

In October 2010, the BSA upheld a complaint against The Edge Morning Madhouse on 8 February 2010 for broadcasting a parody jingle at 8:20 am that made crude sexual references about a public figure’s alleged same-sex relationship. The jingle included explicit phrases such as “rug munching” and “got sick of dicks,” prompting concerns over good taste and decency during a time children might be listening. Although the broadcaster upheld the complaint and reprimanded the host, the BSA found the action taken insufficient given the severity and timing of the breach. It ordered RadioWorks to pay $2,000 in costs to the Crown.

In August 2017, the BSA upheld a complaint regarding the Jay-Jay, Dom & Randell programme. The hosts discussed a prior interview with a voice coach about using a "sexy voice." One host prank-called two phone sex chat lines to test if the operators used such voices. One of the operators, who later filed a complaint, was recorded without consent. Her identity was potentially revealed through her voice and background sounds. The BSA found the programme breached privacy and fairness standards, and ordered The Edge to pay $2,000 in compensation to the complainant and to pay $1,500 in costs to the Crown.
