= Jono Pryor =

New Zealand radio and television personality

- Born: Jonathan Richard Pryor; 13 November 1981 (age 44); Seattle, Washington, US
- Spouse: Jennifer Pryor
- Children: 2
- Presenting career
- Show: Jono and Ben
- Network: Three
- Time slot: 7:30 pm
- Station: The Edge
- Time slot: Weekday drive
- Country: New Zealand

Jonathan Richard Pryor is a New Zealand radio, television personality, and actor, best known as the co-host of Jono and Ben. Pryor worked for the New Zealand radio station The Rock for over 15 years, before moving to The Edge in 2017 to co-host The Edge Afternoons with Jono, Ben & Sharyn with Ben Boyce and Sharyn Casey.

Pryor starred in Amped and The Jono Project on C4, before he began co-hosting Jono and Ben at Ten on Three alongside Boyce in 2012. In 2015, the show moved to prime time at 7:30pm, re-branded as Jono and Ben. The show was cancelled at the end of 2018.

Pryor along with Ben Boyce and Megan Papas host the breakfast show on The Hits.

In 2025, Pryor starred in his own television show called Vince, which premiered on Three.

== Early life ==
Pryor was born in Seattle in the United States. He attended Saint Kentigern’s College in Auckland. He was brought up on air bases in Seattle and Whenuapai as his father was a navigator with the Royal New Zealand Air Force.

== Personal life ==
Jono Pryor is married to Jennifer with whom he has two children.

== See also ==
- List of New Zealand television personalities
