= Wanna-Ben =

- Directed by: Andy Robinson
- Starring: Ben Boyce; Ginette McDonald
- Opening theme: "What You Heard" by The Checks
- Ending theme: "What You Heard" by The Checks
- Country of origin: New Zealand
- Original language: English
- No. of series: 2
- No. of episodes: 18

Production
- Producer: Ben Boyce
- Editors: Andy Robinson; Ben Boyce
- Running time: 22 minutes
- Production company: Yoink Productions

Original release
- Network: TV3
- Release: 8 October 2010 – 23 March 2012

Wanna-Ben (stylised as WANNA-BEn) is a comedy show, themed each week on a different celebrity and their achievements. The series is hosted by New Zealand entertainer Ben Boyce, former co-host of Pulp Sport. Ben Boyce is looking for a new job. However, rather than looking for a boring, everyday desk job, he looks for one that is cool and exciting, like a rock star, millionaire, or fashion icon.

== Format ==
Each episode of “WANNA BEn” sees Ben interview different international celebrities that are at the top of his new chosen career path, turning the spotlight on the celebrities achievements and the various steps they've taken on their road to success. Back home in New Zealand, armed with the sage words of his celebrity mentor, Ben then attempts to emulate their road to success in his own misguided fashion. Ultimately Ben discovers that his road to a new career and attempting to emulate his new idol is full of pain and embarrassment.

Wanna-Ben's animated segments and titles are by Auckland-based animation studio Mukpuddy Animation whose credits include Sparkle Friends for TV2's What Now and Lanky Lampton: A Silly Idea for TV2's Studio 2 LIVE. Mukpuddy Animation is made up of Ryan Cooper, Tim Evans and Alex Leighton.

Wanna-Ben was directed by Andy Robinson, who also worked with Ben on sports comedy television show Pulp Sport.

Each episode features a mix of reality and scripted comedy and features many TV styles - interviews, skits, songs, animation and experiments with the public .

=== Series 1 ===
At the start of each episode a scene was played out with Ben sitting at home watching TV and his mother (played by Ginette McDonald) would tell Ben he needs to get off the couch and find a job. Ben would find an ambitious job listing such as a rock star or movie star, Ben would then begin his quest to be that person.

The episode would then cut between Ben performing various skits often on the unsuspecting public in a similar fashion to the skits seen on Pulp Sport. He would then travel to Hollywood to interview a celebrity relating to his chosen career.

Celebrity interviews included, action movie star Steven Seagal, Spice Girl Mel B, pop sensation Kesha, rock legends Alice Cooper and Bon Jovi’s Richie Sambora, Hustler founder Larry Flynt, hip hop stars Flavor Flav and Vanilla Ice, The Nanny Fran Drescher and skateboarding legend Tony Hawk.

=== Specials ===
In 2011, two one off specials of WANNA-BEn broadcast on TV3 based around key events in New Zealand - the Rugby World Cup and the General Election.

=== Series 2 ===
Series 2 saw a slight change in the format of the show. Each episode would begin with Ben interviewing the celebrity and Ben saying how he wanted to be the person he was interviewing. Ben would then begin his quest back in New Zealand to become that person, following a humiliating scene Ben would then say to the audience that they are probably wondering what made him want to be .... The show would then cut to a flashback scene played out by Ben and his flatmate who happened to be a different New Zealand celebrity each week. The scene played out would show how Ben wanted to be the person he was interviewing.

Series 2 of Wanna-Ben screened in early 2012 and featured interviews with TV presenter Jerry Springer, rock star Bret Michaels, Wrestler Hulk Hogan, actors Henry Winkler and Gary Busey, Taboo from the Black Eyed Peas, boxer George Foreman, environmental activist Erin Brockovich and comedic singer "Weird Al" Yankovic.

In 2011, before filming began on Series 2, Boyce shaved off his trademark dreadlocks to raise money for those affected by the Christchurch earthquake.

On 17 September 2011, the filming of a skit for the second season caused a large-scale security scare at Auckland Airport. An actor dressed as a pilot tried to access airside at the domestic terminal though one of the gates, saying he left his security pass on the plane. Six people, including Ben Boyce, were subsequently arrested for breaching the Civil Aviation Act.

== Reception ==
TV reviewer Chris Philpott of stuff.co.nz said "there's a lot to like about the show" and it "benefits from the comedy style of related show Pulp Sport". He also complimented "Ben's fearless interviewing". Some week's later he also said Wanna-Ben was part of the "best night of TV" on any channel. Chris Philpott said of Series 2 that WANNA-BEn "is much more refined than the first season, much funnier overall and not settling for the easy joke"

TV reviewer Paul Casserly of nzherald.co.nz said during series 2 that the show was "one of the fastest-paced shows in the history of New Zealand TV". He also stated "when he's not being arrested for trying to breach airport security, Ben rounds up celebrities for some jolly japes. Much of it is puerile, which makes it perfect for this timeslot"

Wanna-Ben was nominated for Best Comedy in the 2011 TV Guide Best on the Box Awards.

== Episodes ==
=== Series 1 (2010) ===
No. overall	No. in series	Title	Original release date
1	1	"Pop Star"	8 October 2010
Starring Spice Girl Mel B (aka Scary Spice) and pop singer-songwriter Ke$ha.
2	2	"Movie Star"	15 October 2010
Starring action movie star Steven Seagal.
3	3	"Model"	22 October 2010
Starring Playboy Playmates and reality TV stars Holly Madison & Karissa Shannon.
4	4	"Hip Hop Star:"	29 October 2010
Starring hip hop superstars Flava Flav and Vanilla Ice.
5	5	"Sport Star:"	5 November 2010
Starring professional skateboarder Tony Hawk.
6	6	"Rock Star"	12 November 2010
Starring rock legend Alice Cooper, Bon Jovi's Richie Sambora and Hanson.
7	7	"Comedian"	19 November 2010
Starring comedians Wayne Brady, Carrot Top and Penn & Teller.
8	8	"Retro Star"	3 December 2010
Starring the original Incredible Hulk Lou Ferrigno and The Dukes of Hazzard star Tom Wopat.
9	9	"Businessman"	10 December 2010
Starring Hustler porn king Larry Flynt.
10	10	"TV Star"	17 December 2010
Starring TV sitcom star of The Nanny, Fran Drescher.

=== Specials (2011) ===
No. overall	No. in series	Title	Original release date
11	1	"Rugby Special"	24 September 2011
Starring All Black captain Richie McCaw. Was the lead-in programme to TV3's coverage of the 2011 Rugby World Cup pool match between New Zealand and France.
12	2	"Politician"	25 November 2011
Starring Labour leader Phil Goff, New Zealand First leader Winston Peters, and Mana leader Hone Harawira. The episode was screened on the evening preceding polling day for the 2011 New Zealand general election.

=== Series 2 (2012) ===
No. overall	No. in series	Title	Original release date
13	1	"Kendra and The Fonz"	17 February 2012
Starring "The Fonz" Henry Winkler and Playboy Playmate Kendra Wilkinson.
14	2	"Bret Michaels and Taboo"	24 February 2012
Starring Bret Michaels and Taboo from the Black Eyed Peas.
15	3	"Jerry Springer and Erin Brocovich"	2 March 2012
Starring talk show host Jerry Springer and the real Erin Brockovich.
16	4	"Child Stars"	9 March 2012
Starring Steve Urkel, Stephanie from Full House and the Jonathan Lipnicki from Jerry Maguire.
17	5	"Hulk Hogan and George Foreman"	16 March 2012
Starring wrestler Hulk Hogan and boxing legend George Foreman.
18	6	"Weird Al and Gary Busey"	23 March 2012
Starring comedic/parody songwriter Weird Al Yankovic and actor/crazy person Gary Busey.
