= 2017 New Zealand Radio Awards =

- Awarded for: Excellence in radio broadcasting
- Country: New Zealand
- Presented by: Radio Broadcasters Association
- Website: radioawards.co.nz

The 2017 New Zealand Radio Awards were the awards for excellence in the New Zealand radio industry during 2016. It was the 40th New Zealand Radio Awards, recognising staff, volunteers and contractors in both commercial and non-commercial broadcasting.

== Winners and nominees ==
This is a list of nominees, with winners in bold.

=== Associated Craft Award ===
**Associated Craft Award**

**Bek Wall, Sheridan Hill, Bernadette Read - NZME Trade Marketing Team - NZME All Stations**

- Jessica Knox, Anna Hughes, Alex Jolly, Megan Leach, Laraun Scott, Theo Faithfull, Briony Fern - MediaWorks Trade Marketing Team - MediaWorks Radio
- Jim Cowan - Sound Engineer - RadioLIVE

=== Best Children's Programme ===
**Best Children's Programme**

**The Crazy Kiwi Christmas Kids Show - Phil Guyan, Frank Ritchie, Catherine Sylvester, Levi Guyan, Daryl Habraken, Phil Yule, Erin Carpenter, Chris Newbold, Joshua Couch, Skyler Sylvester, Lauren McLay, Andy Duff, John Key, Jack Tame, Rachel Smalley, Pippa Wetzel, Petra Bagust - Christian Broadcasting Assoc & NZME**

- Suzy & Friends - Radio Show - Suzy Cato, Trevor Plant, Phil Yule, Jordy Searle - Treehut Limited
- Chad Awesomesauce - Suzy Cato, Trevor Plant, Miller Yule, Peter Haynes, Hweiling Ow, Phil Yule - Treehut Limited

=== Best Community Access Programmes ===
**Best Music Programme in Any Language** **The Nobel Dylan - The Folk Music Hour - Davey Calder, Chris Foreman - Access Radio Taranaki 104.4FM**: Space Station Kiwi - Marchell Linzey - Otago Access Radio 105.4FM; Jalsa Dip Chick Moments - Vinesh Prakash, Rajneeta Chand, Smrita Tiwari, Shahil Sharan, Rahul Tiwari, Krish Krishna, Avi Kumar, Monil Nand - Plains FM 96.9	**Best Spoken/ Informational English Language Programme** **Canterbury Cultures - Philippines Export Labour Market - Lana Hart - PlainsFM**: Eastern Rising - ‘The 5th Great Annual Ōtākaro-Avon River Walk' - Tanya Didham, Mark Gibson, Martha Baxendell, David Hill, Becca Bouffandeau, Michelle Whitaker - PlainsFM; Heritage Matters - Bill Southworth, Dougal Stevenson, Jane Edwards, Keith Scott, Judy Southworth, Ann Barrowclough - Otago Access Radio

=== Best Community Campaign ===
**Best Community Campaign**

**Make Kaikoura Crate Again - Bryce Casey, Duncan Heyde, Roger Farrelly, Jennifer Bainbridge, Tom Furniss, Tony Lyall, Aaron Ly, Stacey Wouters, Stacey McLeod - The Rock Network**

- The Big Give - Phillipa Pattison - More FM Nelson
- The Mount Everest Challenge 2016 - Belinda Francis, Jolene James, Lauren White, Renee Pink, Justin Evans - More FM Tauranga

=== Best Content ===
**Best Content Director** **Christian Boston - More FM Network**: Ryan Rathbone - The Edge Network; Philip Bell - Mai FM Network; Brad King - The Rock Network	**Best Creative Feature** **Cool to Korero - Richard Culph, JGeek and the Geeks, Jimi Jackson, Grant Brodie - Mai FM Network**: "33AD" News Headlines - Phil Guyan, Joshua Couch, Bernadine Oliver-Kerby, Hannah Bartlett, Phil Yule, Pat Brittenden, Barry Soper, Daryl Habraken - Newstalk ZB Network simulcast on Radio Sport Network; Martin Crowe Tribute - Asher Bastion - Love It Media
**Best Show Producer** **Chris Bond - Si and Gary Show - More FM Network**: Sarah Bristow - The Paul Henry Show - RadioLIVE Network; Duncan Heyde & Dan Webby - Jono & Ben - The Rock Network	**Best Video** **Jim's Extreme Parkour: Expectations vs. Reality - Stacey McLeod, Jim Cawthorn - The Rock Network**: Jase & PJ - April Fools - Jase Hawkins, PJ Harding, Alex Perigo, Kellie Addison - ZM Network; Jono & Ben Cook Crusade - Jono Pryor, Ben Boyce, Bronwynn Bakker, Jamie Linehan, Ben Winter, Matt Cooke - The Rock Network

=== Best Maori Language Broadcast ===
**Best Maori Language Broadcast**

**OB Tangihanga Nolan Raihania - Kingston Cooper, Moerangi Tihore - Radio Ngati Porou**

- 151yrs Commemoration of Te Kupenga - Tracey Eparaima, Jarrod Dodd, Wiremu Huta-Martin, Kahi Stevens, Mere McLean - Tumeke FM

=== Best New Broadcaster ===
**Best New Broadcaster - Off-Air** **Chanelle Allen - Copywriter - NZME Brands**: Abi Banks - Copywriter - NZME Brands; Laura Kneer - Early Edition Executive Producer and Mike Hosking Breakfast Assistant Producer - Newstalk ZB Network; Liam Kilmister - Creative Writer and Production Support - Mediaworks Wellington	**Best New Broadcaster - On-Air** **Jim Cawthorn - The Rock Network**: Raven Addei - Mai FM Network; Mitch McCann - RadioLIVE / Newshub Network

=== Best News & Sport ===
**Best News or Sports Journalist** **Lloyd Burr - RadioLIVE / Newshub Network**: Brenton Vannisselroy - Newstalk ZB & Radio Sport Network; Barry Soper - Newstalk ZB Network	**Best News Story - Team Coverage** **The Kaikoura Earthquake - Chris Lynch, Tyler Adams, Anastasia Hedge, Kurt Bayer, Chelsea Daniels, Sam Olley - Newstalk ZB Canterbury**: The Mike Hosking Breakfast - Brexit Fallout - Mike Hosking, Jason Winstanley, Nadia Tolich, Glenn Hart, Michael Allan, Laura Kneer, Helen McCarthy, Steph Rowe, Newstalk ZB News Team - Newstalk ZB Network; The Mike Hosking Breakfast: US Election Week - Live from New York - Mike Hosking, Jason Winstanley, Nadia Tolich, Emily Winstanley, Glenn Hart, Laura Kneer, Michael Allan, Steph Rowe, Barry Soper, Newstalk ZB News Team - Newstalk ZB Network; Kaikoura Earthquake - Aroha Hathaway, Grace Cocker, Tony Amos, Kaye Albyt, RadioLIVE News Team - RadioLIVE / Newshub Network
**Best Newsreader** **Niva Retimanu - Newstalk ZB Network**: Trudi Nelson - RadioLIVE / Newshub Network; Bernadine Oliver-Kerby - Newstalk ZB Network	**Best Sports Reader, Presenter or Commentator** **Martin Devlin - Radio Sport Network**: D'Arcy Waldegrave & Goran Paladin - Radio Sport Network; Nigel Yalden - Newstalk ZB & Radio Sport Network
**Best Sports Story - Team Coverage** **Remembering Martin Crowe - Kent Johns, Kerrie Shaw, D'Arcy Waldegrave, Goran Paladin, Eli Mwaijumba, Rikki Swannell, Adam Cooper, Elliott Smith, Andrew Mulligan, Simon Doull, Marc Peard, Gareth Lischner - Radio Sport Network**: Radio Sport Rio Olympics - Nigel Yalden, Brian Ashby, Malcolm Jordan, Daniel McHardy, Peter Montgomery, Brenton Vannisselroy, Rikki Swannell, Gareth Lischner, Eli Mwaijumba, Chris Newbold, Marc Peard, Hayden O'Neill, Anthony Milicich, Kerrie Shaw, Beaven Dewar, Trevor McKewen, Jason Winstanley, NZME Engineering Team - Radio Sport Network; Triumph & Heartbreak - New Zealand at the Rio Olympics - Chris Forster, John McNeil, Lewis Hampton, Jeff McTainsh, Michelle Pickles, Sam Ackerman, Alex Bell, Kirsty Stanway, Geoff Bryan, Aroha Hathaway, Newshub Sport & RadioLIVE - RadioLIVE / Newshub Network	

=== Best On Air ===
**Best Music Breakfast Show - Network** **Jay-Jay, Dom and Randell - Jay-Jay Harvey, Dominic Harvey, Clinton Randell, Kerry Gregory, Carl Thompson, Stephanie Munro, Stephanie Monks - The Edge Network**: Si & Gary - Simon Barnett, Gary McCormick, Chris Bond, Samantha Baxter, Chris Goodyear, Christian Boston - More FM Network; Fletch, Vaughan & Megan - Carl Fletcher, Vaughan Smith, Megan Sellers, Caitlin Marett, James Johnston, James Marbeck - ZM Network	**Best Music Breakfast Show - Single Market** **The Hits Dunedin Breakfast with Callum and P - Callum Procter, Patrina Roche - The Hits Dunedin**: More FM Breakfast with John, Flash & Toast - John Markby, Angela 'Flash' Gordon, Tauha 'Toast' TeKani, Bryn Ingham - More FM Northland; Robert & Jeanette - Robert Rakete, Jeanette Thomas, Braydon Priest, Ian Avery, Nicky Leith - The Breeze Auckland
**Best Music Non-Breakfast Solo Host - Network** **Robert Scott - The Easy Drive Home - Robert Scott - The Breeze Network**: More FM Days - Andy Wright - More FM Network; The Hits Night Show With Estelle - Estelle Clifford - The Hits Network	**Best Music Non-Breakfast Solo Host - Single Market** **The Easy Workday with Katrina Smith - Katrina Smith - The Breeze Wellington**: The Hits Bay Of Plenty Days with Will - Will Johnston - The Hits Bay of Plenty; More FM Workplace Social Club with George - George Smith - More FM Rodney
**Best Music Non-Breakfast Team - Network** **Jono & Ben - Jono Pryor, Ben Boyce, Dan Webby, Duncan Heyde, Bronwynn Bakker - The Rock Network**: Jase & PJ - Jase Hawkins, PJ Harding, Alex Perigo, Miles Blumsom - ZM Network; The Edge Afternoons with Guy, Sharyn & Clint - Guy Williams, Sharyn Casey, Clint Roberts, Samuel Fullick, Chang Hung, Oscar Jackson - The Edge Network	**Best Talk Presenter - Breakfast or Drive** **Duncan Garner - RadioLIVE Drive with Duncan Garner - RadioLIVE Network**: Mike Hosking - The Mike Hosking Breakfast - Newstalk ZB Network; Paul Henry - The Paul Henry Show - RadioLIVE Network
**Best Talk Presenter - Other** **Marcus Lush - Marcus Lush Nights - Newstalk ZB Network**: Leighton Smith - The Leighton Smith Show - Newstalk ZB Network; Martin Devlin - The Devlin Radio Show - Radio Sport Network	

=== Best Promotion ===
**Best Client Digital/Social Promotion** **ZM and Friskies Cat News - Carl Fletcher, Cameron Maurice, Sarah Catran, Vaughan Smith, Megan Sellers - ZM Network**: Jennian Homes - Proud of our Home Arron Smith, Jovan Milovic, Monique Pierce, Jackie Campbell, Andrew Martin - MediaWorks National; Rock 1000+500 with Carters Stacey Wouters, Stacey McLeod, Brad King, Dermott Sweeney, Robert Dickey, Jason Mac - The Rock Network	**Best Client Promotion/Activation - Network** **Jono and Ben's Cool Town Bro - Jono Pryor, Ben Boyce, Duncan Heyde, Dan Webby, Bronwynn Bakker, Jason Mac, Michael Batty, Tony Lyall, Chris Lloyd, Adam Stevenson, Cam Bakker, Monique Pierce, Mel Rundle - The Rock Network**: All Work No Play Very Important Business Trip to Las Vegas with Tradestaff - Nathan Hart, Jeremy Wells, Matt Heath, Chris Goodwin Radio Hauraki Network; BCITO Not Your Average Shed Linda Smeele, Phoebe Turner, Amy Nola, Cameron Maurice, Sarah Catran, Jase Hawkins, PJ Harding, Alex Perigo, Ast Nathan, Daz Suasua - ZM & Flava Network
**Best Network Station Promotion** **Cranzacs - Steve Joll, Kath Bier, Pearl Leonard, Casey Sullivan - The Breeze Wellington**: New World Te Kuiti - Key to the World - Matt Davy, Blair Dowling, Brian Hall - The Hits Waikato; Fix My Smile - The Dental Suite - Shaun Piercy, Brent Harbour, Lance Dunne, Lia Shelford - More FM Rodney	**Best Digital Engagement** **http://www.therock.net.nz - Stacey McLeod, Michael Baker, Alice Murray, Josh Post, Sharina Delluta, Kathleen Waller, Cathrin Jaeger - The Rock Network**: http://www.maifm.co.nz - Talia Purser, Amber Howard, Alice Murray, Michael Baker, Philip Bell, Charene Siakimotu, Cathrin Jaeger, Michal Hempel, Rosa Volz, Greg Montgomery - Mai FM Network; http://www.theedge.co.nz Samuel Fullick, Stephanie Munro, Michael Baker, Alice Murray, Nathaniel Smith, Bronte Adshead, Cathrin Jaeger, Rosa Volz, Nicky Leith - The Edge Network
**Best Marketing Campaign** **Coast Ambassadors - Lauren Driffill, Abbie Mackay, Sheryl Dunlop, Justine Black, Tracey Fox - Coast Nationwide** **50 Years Since They Told Us We Couldn't - Kate Britten, Mikhal Norriss, Mike McClung, Dan Bradley, Tracey Fox, Justine Black, Michael Fuiava, John Galliers, Claudia Williams - Radio Hauraki Network**: Know Your Sound - Claire Chellew - The Sound Network	**Best Network Station Promotion** **National Crate Day - Stacey Wouters, Michael Baker, Stacey McLeod - The Rock Network**: Camp Edge - Carl Thompson, Bex Dewhurst, Dena Roberts, Angela Wedekind - The Edge Network; ZM's Wedding Unplanners - Hayley Gillespie, Louise Hawkins, Anna Kemp, Cameron Maurice, Ross Flahive, Carl Fletcher, Vaughan Smith, Megan Sellers, James Johnston, Caitlin Marett - ZM Network
**Best Single Market Station Promotion** **Guns'N'Roses on The Breeze - Steve Joll, Kath Bier, Pearl Leonard, Casey Sullivan - The Breeze Wellington**: Radio Hauraki's Legendary No Sleep til Breakfast - Christchurch Edition; Nathan Hart, Jodie Gill, Felixe O'Keefe, Cynthia Monardez - Radio Hauraki Christchurch; Blind Date to Brisbane - Logan Toomer, Patrina Roche, Callum Proctor - The Hits Dunedin	**Best Station Digital/Social Promotion** **National Crate Day - Stacey Wouters, Michael Baker, Stacey McLeod - The Rock Network**: Jase and PJ's 52 Hour On-air Marathon - Jase Hawkins, PJ Harding, Alex Perigo, Miles Blumsom, Ross Flahive, Louise Hawkins, Cameron Maurice, Rod Maldon, Lucy Carthew - ZM Network; Guns'N'Roses on The Breeze - Steve Joll, Kath Bier, Pearl Leonard, Casey Sullivan - The Breeze Wellington

=== Best Radio Creative ===
**Best Creative Commercial - Single or Campaign** **Corn Evil - The End is Near Alastair Barran The Edge Auckland**: NZTA Far North - No Butts - Alastair Barran - Mai FM Northland; Follow - Shara Benitez - Radio Sport, Hauraki - Multi Market	**Best Voice Talent** **Gerard Cronin - MediaWorks All Stations**: Leilani Fokelau - MediaWorks All Stations; Paul Corbett - George FM Auckland
**Most Effective Commercial - Single or Campaign** '**Phone a Friend' - Scott Armstrong, Tim Woodley - ZB, Sport, Hits, Hauraki Nationwide**: Jennian Homes - Proud of our Home Kelvin Crickett, Gareth Curtis, Arron Smith, Monique Pierce, Jackie Campbell - MediaWorks Network; Brexite, Aussies, Key - Chris Howden, Bryan Thompson, James Irwin, Malcolm Burr, Raymond Laursen - Newstalk ZB & Hits Auckland	

=== Best Spoken Programmes ===
**Best Daily or Weekly Series**

**Larry Williams Drive - Larry Williams, Laura Smith, Louis Herman-Watt, Thomas Thexton, Laura Heathcote - Newstalk ZB Network**

- Saturday Morning with Jack Tame - Jack Tame, Helen McCarthy - Newstalk ZB Network
- The Country - Jamie Mackay, Dom George, Jane Ferguson - Newstalk ZB, Radio Sport, Hokonui, Central FM, Burn 729AM and iHeart Radio Network

=== Best Technical Production ===
**Best Station Imaging** **Grant Brodie - The Edge Network**: Joe Baxendale - The Rock Network; Alistair Cockburn - ZM Network	**Best Station Trailer** **Justin Bieber Campaign - Alistair Cockburn, Gary Pointon, Ross Flahive, Abi Banks, Dan Bernstone, Caitlin Marett - ZM Network** **Donald Trump Make NZ Crate Again - Joe Baxendale, Jason Mac - The Rock Network**: Meet The Music Director - Grant Brodie, Richie Culph, Reagan White, K'lee McNabb - The Edge Network
**Commercial Production** **Driveways - Ben French - Mai FM Northland**: Small Change - Ben French - Mai FM Northland; Spookers 'Final Massacre' - Chris Hurring - The Rock Auckland	

=== Sales Team of the Year ===
**Best Network Sales Team** **MediaWorks National Agency - Donna Gurney, Gerhard Simanke, Paul Glaister, Matt Bowness, Amanda Nicholls, Matt Tattle, Amelia MacDiarmid, Mike Berry, Nicole Jones, Jude Taylor, Johnathan Schaffer, Tim Norman - MediaWorks National**: MediaWorks Auckland - Lee-Ann Collett, Matt Tremain, Kevin Crane, Anna McGovern - MediaWorks Auckland; NZME Auckland - Neil Jackson, Peter Revell, Nic Hurman, Jenna Smith - NZME Auckland	**Best Regional/Provincial Sales Team** **MediaWorks Taupo/Rotorua - Penny Lyons, Irene Nottage, Brent Marshall, Julia Manktelow, Leah Withington, James Nottage - MediaWorks Taupo/Rotorua**: MediaWorks Tauranga - Belinda Francis, Bernie Morgan, John Bedford, Kirt Richards, Kimberley Hayward, Jaimie Thompson, Brooke Manson - MediaWorks Tauranga

=== Station of the Year ===
**Station of the Year - Network** **ZM - Ross Flahive - ZM Network**: The Edge - Ryan Rathbone - The Edge Network; The Rock - Brad King - The Rock Network	**Station of the Year - Non-Surveyed Market** **One Double X - Glenn Smith - One Double X Eastern Bay of Plenty**: More FM Taupo - Penny Lyons, Dougal Morison, Sara Pilkington More FM Taupo; More FM Rodney - Brent Harbour, Anna McGovern, Dean McGovern, Shaun Piercy, Lance Dunne, Lia Shelford, George Smith - More FM Rodney
**Station of the Year - Surveyed Market** **More FM Canterbury - Christian Boston, Rob McDonald - More FM Canterbury**: More FM Manawatu - Willie Furnell - More FM Manawatu; More FM Northland - Erena Miller, Bryn Ingham, Chook Henare - More FM Northland	

=== 'The Blackie' (Award) ===
'**The Blackie' (Award)**

**Scotty J Word insertion - Matt Heath, Jeremy Wells, Joseph Durie, Chris Goodwin - Hauraki Network**

- Jay-Jay Dom and Randell's World Youngest Bungy Jay-Jay Harvey, Dominic Harvey, Clinton Randell, Kerry Gregory, Carl Thompson, Noel Faulkner, Stephanie Munro - The Edge Network
- Guns'N'Roses on The Breeze - Steve Joll, Kath Bier, Pearl Leonard, Casey Sullivan - The Breeze Wellington

=== Outstanding Contribution to Radio ===
**Outstanding Contribution to Radio**

**Jac Kluts**

**Wendy Palmer**

=== Services to Broadcasting ===
**Services to Broadcasting**

**Simon Marsh**

**Wayne Sleeman**

**Ronnie Phillips**

**Allen McLaughlin**
