= 48 Hour Film Festival =

48 Hour Film Festival may refer to:

- 48 Hour Film Project, an annual film competition
- 48Hours, a New Zealand film-making competition
