= Pulp Sport =

New Zealand TV series or programme

- Genre: Sports comedy
- Presented by: Jamie Linehan; Ben Boyce
- Ending theme: Ol' Skool by The WBC
- Country of origin: New Zealand
- Original language: English
- No. of series: 7

Production
- Running time: 30 minutes
- Production company: Shonky Productions

Original release
- Network: Sky Sport 1 (2003–2004); TV3 (2005–2009)
- Release: 2003 – 16 October 2009

Pulp Sport is a New Zealand television show that mixes sport with various styles of comedy. The hosts Jamie Linehan and Ben Boyce acted under their respective pseudonyms Bill and Ben, performing a half-hour of various sports based skits. They were usually accompanied by an anthropomorphic fox mascot.

== History ==
Pulp Sport started as a radio show on Radio Sport in 2001, and ran until the TV series began in 2003 on SKY Sport Syndication and also C4 where it achieved strong ratings. As a result, it was soon acquired by TV3 where its popularity continued to grow with even better ratings. In 2006 and 2007, Pulp Sport was judged "New Zealand's Best Comedy" at the Qantas New Zealand Television Awards. It was also a finalist in 2008 and again in 2010. In the 2009 TV Guide Best of the Box Awards, Pulp Sport was voted "Funniest TV Show" and Bill and Ben were voted "Funniest Person on TV".

The first series of Pulp Sport was made by Boyce and Linehan and their two mates using only one camera and edited on a borrowed computer in a kitchen flat. In the second series, they moved out to a garden shed.

In 2003, actor Jay Laga'aia appeared in Pulp Sport's first ever episode. During the sketch he appeared in, Laga'aia injured his knee cap in two places, ending up in hospital for two days. This mishap delayed the filming of Star Wars: Episode III – Revenge of the Sith, which Laga'aia was to act in later that month.

In 2004, while playing one of their regular pranks on New Zealand sports commentator Stephen McIvor, Bill and Ben hired a plane to fly the message "McIvor blows goats" over a New Zealand Warriors National Rugby League game at Ericsson Stadium. McIvor and the New Zealand Police expressed their disgust over the message and consequently Linehan and Boyce received a police warning.

Linehan and Boyce set up their own political party, Bill and Ben Party, a joke political party based on their Pulp Sport personas. In the 2008 New Zealand general election, they received 13,016 votes, approximately 0.56% of the total party vote, out-polling all minor parties in the election.

Network Ten in Australia syndicated the episodes on their sports channel One in 2010 and 2011. Three series of the show also played on Fuel TV in Australia. Three of the series also went on to a limited run of DVDs.

Boyce went on to star in two series of his own show WANNA-BEn in 2011 and then Jono and Ben at Ten in 2013.

== Segments ==
The show featured recurring skit segments in each episode.

=== Active in the final series ===
- The Great Tui Sneak – a segment in which the hosts Bill and Ben attempt to sneak Tui beer into a New Zealand sports stadium where there is an enforced alcohol ban, such as Eden Park. Different methods have included – sneaking the beer via an IV drip, a coffin, a remote control car, a wrapped birthday present, dressing up as Schapelle Corby to do it and a fibreglass cow.
- Sporting Hell – This skit starts with the hosts flipping a coin. The winner of the coin toss is rewarded with a pizza from the sponsor, while the loser is forced to do often humiliating sport-themed stunts. An example of a 'Sporting Hell' is of the loser attending a motor-racing meeting cross-dressing as a scantly-dressed promotional woman promoting the amusingly named Golden Gaytime branded ice cream cones to often homophobic male attendees. This section of the show is sponsored by the New Zealand food company Hell Pizza. In season 7 on the show, the coin used for the coin toss is replaced by a custom 'Bill and Ben' coin, showing one of the hosts' face and name on each side of the coin.
- Soul Destroyer – An extension of Sporting Hell – the host performing the Sporting Hell challenge must complete the challenge to a certain standard. If they pass, the other host must perform the Soul Destroyer; if they fail, they must perform the Soul Destroyer themselves. The task is related to the Sporting Hell challenge and is usually performed to members of the public.
- Celebrity Challenge – Each week some of New Zealand's biggest celebrities are paired up with some of New Zealand's biggest sports stars to partake in ridiculous challenges based around the person's chosen sport. This usually develops into a parody of a well-known television show, such as Prison Break or MythBusters. Celebrities that have appeared on Pulp Sport Celebrity Challenges include actors Temuera Morrison and Rhys Darby, sports stars Dan Carter and Michael Campbell and Australian talk show host Rove.
- Super-Streaker – A weekly clip of an unknown man, wearing only gloves, a cape and a Wolverine mask, streaking at inappropriate events such as a lawn bowls game or a round of golf. The skit is set to the theme song of the Superman films.
- Mc Kay-ver – This skit replaced 'McIvor' when Pulp Sport moved to TV3 from SKY Television. This skit, a spoof of the television show MacGyver, involve the hosts playing pranks on TV3 sports reporter Hamish McKay. The pranks often revolve around the victim's car, such as covering the car with Post-it notes or decorating it in a manner similar to that of the General Lee, and / or around the victim's office area, such as wrapping the victim's office equipment with fishing line. At the end of the final episode McKay took revenge on Bill and Ben and played a prank on them with the Pulp Sport production van. The production van, a Toyota Hiace was covered in artificial lawn the interior of the rear of the van filled with dirt and the van taken to a golf driving range where players then hit the van with golf balls smashing windows.

The Mc Kay-ver segment has been seen in the shows successor WANNA-BEn on at least 2 occasions.

- Anti-Social Sportsman (ASS) – A segment in which one of the hosts dresses up in usually 1980s fashion style sports clothing, and deliberately commits anti-social acts against the unsuspecting public, who are in the middle of playing a sports game. An example of this is getting a netball handed to the anti-social sportsman to play with, only for him to throw it over the fence. The Anti-Social Sportsman usually begins this skit by asking to have a turn at the game the unsuspecting public is playing. The Anti-Social Sportsman was played by Flynny from the radio station ZM.
- Bloody Asian Driver – A section, whose title is based on the stereotype that people of Asian descent are inadequate drivers of automobiles, in which someone of Asian descent commits anti-social acts with a golf club and a golf ball, for example, playing a golf shot at an intersection and hitting a car with the golf ball.
- Thomas the Tackle Bag – A skit in which an unknown person dresses up as a Rugby football tackle bag dressed to resemble Thomas the Tank Engine and walks until a member of the public tackles the tackle bag with the unknown person inside. The name of this skit draws its inspiration from the children's television show Thomas and Friends. The narration style to this skit also mimics the narration style found on the children's show.
- Mascot Recession Busters – A segment in which the canine mascot suggests and enacts advice for people to deal with the economic recession of the Late 2000s.

=== Retired ===
- Yours Please – A playful jab at New Zealand sports talk back host Murray Deaker and his catch phrase.
- McIvor – A segment where Bill and Ben would play pranks on New Zealand SKY Sport broadcaster Steven McIvor. Unlike his successor, McIvor reacted very aggressively to the pranks.
- 6.0 Minutes – A parody of the New Zealand current events show 60 Minutes. The skit was originally aired when the show was airing on New Zealand radio station Radio Sport.
- Urban Creatures – A parody of the Crocodile Hunter Steve Irwin. Steve Urban explores the "amazing creatures" of the sporting world usually killing someone in the process. However, this segment was omitted season 5 after Steve Irwin died.
- 101 Uses for (insert name here) – skits that see Bill and Ben finding mundane uses for a sportsperson's talents. Some participants thus far have included basketball player Ben Pepper, All Black Byron Kelleher and rowing twins Caroline and Georgina Evers-Swindell
- Father v Son – These skits, a reference to old advertisements for the Instant Kiwi scratch card and filmed usually in black and white, involves a young boy playing different sports against his highly competitive father. The young boy often beats his father in the chosen sport, who in turn, out of frustration, resorts to drastic measures (for comedic effect) to defeat his son, including violence and cheating. Retired after season 5.
- Can a Mascot? – This skit involves the Pulp Sport Mascot (a person in a big brown furry fox suit) attempting to complete often comical or socially unaccepted challenges such as sneaking into an establishment without paying or sneaking on to another TV show. Retired after season 5.
- The Mad Mad Butcher – Series of stunts based around New Zealand Celebrity business man The Mad Butcher. The Pulp Sport Mad Mad Butcher attempts each week to prove to 'dickless bastards' that he is mad by doing crazy, sometimes bizarre stunts. This segment often starts with the line "Some of you dickless bastards still don't think I'm mad...". Retired after season 5.
- Halfass – A parody of the television series Jackass. This skit involves the hosts, Bill and Ben, accompanied by friends, attempting extremely tame stunts, under the premise that New Zealand television companies insist on making 'half-arsed ripoffs' of other television shows, with a small skit at the beginning of the segment parodying this, for example, 'Allan Border Patrol' being a parody of the television show Border Patrol. Examples of tame stunts include walking with untied shoelaces, standing on an office chair and running with scissors.
- Man-Love Moments – A montage of sporting clips set to provocative music such as Barry White or Marvin Gaye, showing sportsmen in sexually suggestive positions or committing sexually suggestive actions. In season 6, this tended to be the last segment in each episode, playing while the credits roll.
- PSPN World Series of Drinking – A parody of ESPN's World Series of Poker, where the competitors play drinking games, which often results in a fight breaking out.
- Pulp Sport was sponsored by the energy beverage Lift Plus and contained skits that pay homage to Lift Plus advertisements.
- The Grynch Who Stole Sport! – This skit, introduced in season 5 of the show, draws its inspiration from the Dr. Seuss children's book How the Grinch Stole Christmas!. Every week an unknown person dressed as 'The Grinch' steals a sports item in the middle of a sport game played by the unsuspecting public, such as a rugby ball.

== DVDs ==
DVD name	No. of eps	Classification	Release date	Additional information	Seasons
Volume 2	8	M	2007	This DVD set contains all eight episodes from the fifth season.	5
Volume 3	8	R13	2008	This DVD set contains all eight episodes from the sixth season.	6
Volume 4	8	R16	2009	This DVD set contains all eight episodes from the seventh season.	7

== Footnotes ==
- In one episode in Season 7, the Sporting Hell challenge involving a freezer was called off after Bill's body temperature fell below 35 °C (95 °F) and was at risk of developing hypothermia. In this case, both presenters had to perform the Soul Destroyer, which in this case, was that they had to suck on ice-blocks made from their own urine. Which after they had taken a bite they were informed that the labels on the ice blocks had been swapped and they had eaten each other's urine.

This was actually true and confirmed by the medic.
