= Ben Boyce =

New Zealand television personality (born 1979)

- Born: 1 January 1979 (age 47); Auckland, New Zealand
- Education: New Zealand Broadcasting School
- Occupations: Television presenter, radio presenter, comedian
- Years active: 2001–present
- Known for: Jono and Ben
- Spouse: Amanda Boyce (m. 2008)
- Children: 2

Ben Boyce is a New Zealand television and radio personality and comedian best known as the host of TV shows Pulp Sport, Wanna-Ben and Jono and Ben on TV3.

== Biography ==
Boyce is a graduate of the New Zealand Broadcasting School at CPIT (now Ara Institute of Canterbury). He was also the co-founder of New Zealand political party the Bill and Ben Party, which ran for government in the 2008 New Zealand general election and received over 13,000 votes, making it New Zealand's ninth most popular political party (out of 19).

Boyce started out writing radio commercials, such as the popular Novus Windscreens "Show Us Your Crack" jingle. He then moved on to radio announcing, creating Pulp Sport on Radio Sport and later doing the night show on The Rock FM.

Boyce created and starred in seven series of Pulp Sport. The show began as a small cult show made in a garden shed to become one of New Zealand's most successful comedy shows. The show ran for seven series on TV3, C4 and Sky Sport in New Zealand, sold to Fuel TV and Network Ten in Australia. While on Pulp Sport, Boyce twice won Best Comedy Show at the New Zealand TV Awards and "Funniest Person on TV" in the TV Guides People's Choice award in 2009.

Boyce also ran for parliament in the 2008 general election with his joke party called Bill and Ben Party. It was the ninth most popular party with over 13,000 votes.

In 2010 Boyce created and starred in two series of Wanna-Ben which saw him interviewing and attempting to emulate international stars like actors Steven Seagal and Henry Winkler, talk show host Jerry Springer, pop star's Mel B from the Spice Girls and Ke$ha, rock legends Alice Cooper and Bret Michaels, Wrestler Hulk Hogan and the real Erin Brockovich.

In 2011 and 2012, Boyce hosted the New Zealand Music Awards and co-hosted in 2016 and 2017. In 2011 Boyce shaved off his dreadlocks to raise money for a charity supporting the Christchurch earthquake.

In 2012 Boyce teamed up with Jono Pryor and Guy Williams to create Jono and Ben at Ten. The show has become one of TV3's most popular and highest rating shows. In 2013, 2014 and 2015 the show was nominated for TV Guide's People's Choice for "Best Comedy" and saw both Boyce and Pryor nominated for "Funniest Person on TV". TV3 announced the show was moving to prime time at 7.30pm in 2015 under the name Jono and Ben.

In 2014, Boyce again teamed up with Pryor on The Rock to host the weekday afternoon show from 3 to 7pm. That same year, they brought 90s hip hop star Vanilla Ice to New Zealand to do the "Vanilla Ice Bucket Challenge" – dump two truck loads of ice water over them. Afterwards Boyce and Pryor hosted Vanilla Ice in a sold-out concert.

In 2015, Boyce and Pryor both released their own limited edition Jono and Ben V Energy Drinks. The promotion put Boyce and Pryor against each other with their own separate flavours and a competition to be the most popular.

In September 2015, Boyce and Pryor sailed a children's bouncy castle across Lake Taupō in central New Zealand. The journey was 40 km and took almost 10 hours. In February 2016, the duo crossed the Cook Strait on a banana boat, after being challenged by Rock morning show host Bryce Casey. They attained the unofficial world record for the longest time spent in a bumper car, with 30 hours at Rainbows End.

In 2017, Boyce and Pryor started working on The Edge radio station. The same year, Boyce and Pryor drove a tractor over 650 km from Auckland to Palmerston North, and broke the world record for the longest TV interview, interviewing celebrities for over 30 hours.

In 2018, Jono and Ben was cancelled; the final show was aired on 15 November 2018. Since 2020, Boyce and Pryor have hosted the breakfast show on The Hits and Dog Almighty on TVNZ 2.

== Personal life ==
In 2008, Boyce married his wife Amanda, in Fiji. Amanda Boyce is a schoolteacher at Balmoral School, which in central Auckland. They have two daughters, born 2009 and 2011.

== Controversy ==
On 17 September 2011, the filming of a skit for the second season of Wanna-Ben caused a large-scale security scare at Auckland Airport. Bryce Casey, host of The Morning Rumble on The Rock, dressed as a pilot and tried to access airside at the domestic terminal though one of the gates, saying he left his security pass on the plane. Six people, including Boyce, were subsequently arrested for laws breaching the Civil Aviation Act. In 2012, they were discharged with no convictions.

== See also ==
- List of New Zealand television personalities
