= Bill and Ben Party =

Bill and Ben
- Leader: Ben Boyce and Jamie Linehan
- Founded: 2008
- Dissolved: 29 April 2010
- Ideology: Joke political party
- Colours: Dark green

Website
- Facebook

The Bill and Ben Party was a New Zealand joke political party formed in 2008 and voluntarily deregistered in 2010. The party's leaders were Jamie Linehan and Ben Boyce ("Bill and Ben") of the TV3 satirical sports show Pulp Sport. In the 2008 general election the party secured 0.56% of the vote and the ninth-highest number of votes, outpolling every other party not in parliament prior to the election.

On 1 July 2008 the party applied for registration with the Electoral Commission, which would allow it to contest the party vote. The party was registered by the Electoral Commission on 29 July 2008. On 31 July 2008 the party applied to register a logo with the Electoral Commission.

The party states that it managed to secure its required 500 members for Electoral Act registration after locating the requisite number of inebriated university students outside a student drinking establishment.

== 2008 general election ==
For the 2008 general election, the party chose not to apply for the $10,000 in advertising money that all political parties are entitled to. It felt this was a waste of taxpayer's money, and self-funded its advertising. This also meant that it did not qualify for a TVNZ Political Party Opening Address.

It stood on a "no policies, no promises, no disappointment" platform and had the slogan "We're putting the party back in political party". It is understood New Zealand First Leader Winston Peters took exception to one of its election signs, which used the phrase "C'mon, you voted Winston in".

In the election on 8 November, the party secured 13,016 votes (0.56% of votes), allowing a refund of the $1000 party registration fee. It put the money on the bar in Invercargill as it received more votes from there than anywhere else.

Even though it was a joke political party, it out-polled all but one party (New Zealand First) that did not gain representation in the last election [what year?], including every other new party: the New Zealand Pacific Party, The Kiwi Party, The Family Party, the Workers Party and the Residents Action Movement. It gained the ninth-highest number of votes out of the 19 parties in the election, and would have earned a seat if there had been no electoral threshold. It spent NZ$3,777 on advertising, $0.29 per vote, making it the most effective party in terms of dollars per vote.

Due to the way that mixed member proportional representation works, had the party crossed the minimum 5% threshold required to be admitted to parliament without an electorate seat, the total number of MPs would have been reduced by about four (an "underhang"). This is because 5% of the vote would entitle it to approximately six MPs but it had only two candidates (Bill and Ben) on its party list. However, the underhang would have partially been cancelled out by the Māori Party's overhang, having won five electorate seats when entitled to only three by the party vote.

== 2009 Mount Albert by-election ==
Ben stood in the Mount Albert by-election on 13 June 2009 and secured 151 votes (0.76% of the vote), coming fifth. This is an improvement on the 0.38% party vote obtained in Mt Albert at the 2008 election. He out-polled the candidate from United Future New Zealand, a former MP, and every other micro party and independent candidate, including the Aotearoa Legalise Cannabis Party and The Kiwi Party.

== Deregistration ==
On 17 March 2010 the party applied to the Electoral Commission to be deregistered, which took effect on 29 April 2010.
