= Mukpuddy Animation =

New Zealand based animation studio

Mukpuddy Animation Limited
- Type: Private
- Industry: Animation
- Founded: March 11, 2003; 23 years ago
- Founders: Alex Leighton; Ryan Cooper; Tim Evans
- Headquarters: Auckland, New Zealand
- Key people: Alex Leighton; Ryan Cooper; Tim Evans
- Products: Animated series Animated films Mobile games
- Owners: Alex Leighton; Ryan Cooper; Tim Evans
- Number of employees: >40 (2003)
- Website: mukpuddy.com

Mukpuddy Animation is an animation studio based in Auckland, New Zealand, founded by Alex Leighton, Ryan Cooper, and Tim Evans in the early 2000s.

== Origins ==
Leighton, Cooper, and Evans all resided in Auckland. They met when they were studying at Freelance Animators New Zealand's Auckland based Freelance Animation School. While there they began to create skits and develop concepts. Once they graduated they set up a studio in Evans' basement, naming the studio Mukpuddy Animation. The company was registered in 2003.

Initially Mukpuddy developed 2D cartoons and posted them on the internet. This wasn't very successful so the trio had to supplement their income by undertaking design work and commercials. They also created and ran their own movie magazine called Mukmouth which covered new cinema releases and contained cartoons they had drawn.

== Animation ==
In 2006, with Jeremy Dillon, Mukpuddy got the opportunity to make content for the Television New Zealand children's programme What Now. Its first production called Sparkle Friends was televised on both TVNZ and Australia's ABC network. In 2010, Toonz Entertainment USA, the distribution unit of Toonz Media Group, acquired the rights for worldwide distribution.

Mukpuddy then made Pocket Protectors and CRUMBS, a satire of 1980's action films for the programme. In 2012 NZ On Air funded Mukpuddy to make a one-off Christmas special called Missing Christmas. In 2016 Mukpuddy created its own children's show called The Barefoot Bandits. This show ran for three seasons on TVNZ. Voice actors for the show included Rhys Darby, Jemaine Clement, and Lucy Lawless. One of the shows voice actors Cameron Rhodes was nominated for the 2017 BTVA Television Voice Acting Award for Best Male Vocal Performance in a Television Series in a Guest Role, for his performance in the series.

Following its success with producing cartoons for What Now, Mukpuddy entered the 48 Hours filmmaking competition in 2007. Its entry Camp Fear was the first animated film to win the Auckland regionals. Mukpuddy entered the competition three more times, in 2011, 2012, and 2014 respectively, reaching the national finals each time.

By 2020 Mukpuddy had produced several series: Quimbo’s Quest, The Drawing Show, and a comedy called The Adventures of Tumeke Space. Mukpuddy also contributed to Tales of Nai Nai, Pipi Mā and The Zelfs.

Mukpuddy provided animation sequences for the 2021 film Shadow in the Cloud. In 2022 Mukpuddy decided to explore film production with a short film titled Out of Order. It also provided the animations for Wellington-based Chris Lam Sam's 2022 New Zealand Children's Music Award-winning video called Song about nothing.

== International ==
By 2023 Mukpuddy employed over 40 staff and were creating a new series based on Badjelly the Witch. Also in production were The Dead Sea Squirrels working with Mike Nawrocki and Juju Brain with Pencilish Animation Studios.

== Mobile and computer games ==
Mukpuddy have released three mobile games: Barefoot Bandits Water Bomb Battle, Fall on Paul, and Jess Go For It.

== Productions ==
=== Individual series ===
- Dirk Banzai (2002–03)
- Skid & Hokey (2002–03)
- XLR8 (2002)
- Armageddon (2003)
- Heroes 4 Sale (2003–04)
- Hell Pizza (2005)
- Sparkle Friends (2006–11)
- Saturday Disney (2006)
- Quiziq (2007)
- It's the Pughs - Help Me Rudy! (2008)
- Meanie Pants
- Pocket Protectors (2011)
- Love in Decay - A Zombie Love Story
- C.R.U.M.B.S
- Dead End Job
- Missing Christmas
- The Adventures of Tumeke Space

=== Series ===
- The Barefoot Bandits (2016)
- Quimbo's Quest (2019)
- The Drawing Show (2019)
- Jandal Burn (2019)
- Night Eyes (2023–25)

=== Pilot series ===
- Dirk Banzai (2009)
- The Stallion (2009)
- Terry the Bi-Polar Bi-Polar Bear (2009)

=== Collaborations ===
- Badjelly the witch
- The Dead Sea Squirrels
- Juju Brain
- Tales of Nai Nai
- Pipi Mā
- The Zelfs

=== Short films ===
- Killing Dino (2003)
- Trans Tour (2005)
- FredEx (2006)
- Taste Buddies (2006)
- Camp Fear (2007)
- Out of Order

=== Music videos ===
- Stomping (2003) by King Kapisi
- Baby Cruel (2005) by Pluto

=== Children's books ===
- Sometimes (2003)
- Leopold the Wondercat (2005)
- The Farmyard Chorus (2006)

=== Comics ===
- Dirk Banzai: Secret Agent Lemur (2002)
- My Pet Freak (2002)
- Jack Hero (2004–05)
- Solomon Phelp (2004)

=== Mobile games ===
- Barefoot Bandits Water Bomb Battle
- Fall on Paul
- Jess Go For It

== Associated companies ==
- Mukpuddy Limited founded on 9 May 2006 and trading as The Muks. Shareholders are Cooper, Leighton, and Evans
- Badjelly NZ Limited founded 15 March 2023 and part owned by Mukpuddy Limited, Media Tech Productions NZ Limited, and Simon J B Ward
- The Stud Farm Limited extant from 22 June 2009 to 30 September 2011 and part owned by Mukpuddy Limited, Shonkey Productions Limited, and Zane Murry Holmes
