= 48Hours =

New Zealand film-making competition

- Location: New Zealand
- Founded: 2004
- Hosted by: Ant Timpson
- Festival date: 2020 (TBD)
- Website: http://www.48hours.co.nz

48Hours is a New Zealand film-making competition. It involves teams of various sizes competing to write, shoot, edit and score a short film, which must be between 1 and 5 minutes long (7 minutes before 2016), over a single 48-hour period. Developed from the US-based 48 Hour Film Project, which was run in Auckland in 2003, 48Hours has been running as a New Zealand-only event since 2004, with regional competitions organised in 8 cities and regions around New Zealand: Auckland, Hamilton, Gisborne, Bay of Plenty, Taranaki, Wellington, Christchurch, and Dunedin.

The event was founded by Anthony "Ant" Timpson and is organised by Ness Patea and Ruth Korver. There is a launch event on Friday night of the shoot weekend, where each team is given a randomly selected genre. They are also given three compulsory elements which are common to all teams. These are a line of dialogue, a prop, a character, and since 2010, a "technical" element.

All creative work required to produce the film must be undertaken and completed within the 48 hours of the competition. This includes storylining, scriptwriting, filming, editing and audio mixing. Teams must deliver their finished film to the competition organisers by the Sunday evening to be eligible for prizes, although late deliveries will still be screened in the heats.

By 2011 the competition had grown to include more than 800 teams nationwide with at least 10,000 people believed to be involved. In 2020, there was a free lockdown version of the competition which was run in level 4. There were 1208 films created over one weekend.

== Compulsory elements ==
Every year teams are given a number of compulsory elements to help ensure that film has been wholly created on the shoot weekend. The elements include a character with a gender-neutral name, a character trait, a line of dialogue, a prop, and as of 2010, a technical shot. As well as these, teams are randomly allocated a genre for their film. 2017 saw the introduction of themes, different elements, and the ULTRA48 Challenge for teams that elect to do it for added difficulty.

Year	Character	Character trait	Line of dialogue	Prop	Technical shot	Shoot weekend	Refs.
2003	Gnarly Watson (Note: The 2003 competition was part of the 48 Hour Film Project. "The Auckland 48 Hour Film Project". 48 Hour Film Project.)	Rock 'n' roll legend	"I didn't see that coming."	Torch	—N/a		
2004	Jesse McCloud (Auckland) (Note: In 2004 Auckland and Wellington were given different elements.)	Total has-been	"Do you mind if I have the last one?"	Ice	—N/a		
2004	Terry Spears (Wellington)	Model	"Just put that down nice and easy."	Doll	—N/a		
2005	Bodil de Resny	Animal lover	"Please don't do that."	Banana (Note: A bonus prop of "a red scarf" was to be included.)	—N/a	13–15 May	
2006	Robin Slade	Eternal optimist	"That's what I'm talking about."	Mirror	—N/a	26–28 May	
2007	Jerry Reed	Hypochondriac	"What do you call that?"	Rope	—N/a	18–20 May	
2008	Kerry Post	Perfectionist	"Wait a minute."	Brush	—N/a	16–18 May	
2009	Alex Puddle	Exaggerator	"It doesn't fit."	Rock	—N/a	8–10 May	
2010	Sidney Manson	Fabricator	"When you look at it that way..."	Broken toy	Dolly zoom	16–18 Apr	
2011	Bobby Young	Ex-bully	"What have you got?"	Bent wire	Freeze-frame shot	20–22 May	
2012	Nicky Brick	Unlucky person	"I did that."	Leaf	Slow motion	18–20 May	
2013	Vic Meyer	Insomniac	"Did you hear that?"	Card	Point of view shot	24–26 May	
2014	Morgan Foster	Liar	"Not with that you're not."	Ball	Extreme close up/macro	4–6 Apr	
2015	Harper Harrison	Thoughtless	"Oh, really?"	Bread	Match cut/match dissolve	1–3 May	
2016	Charlie Flowers	Thoughtful person	"One more time"	Wool	Rack focus	16–18 Sep	

Year	Character	Physical Element	Sound Effect	Technical shot	ULTRA48 Challenge	Shoot weekend	Refs.
2017 (Note: Each team had to choose one theme from this list: Redemption, Love, Transformation, Sacrifice, Vengeance, Friendship, Justice, Jealous, Ambition, Fate.)	A female	Collision	Wilhelm Scream	Smash cut	Create a sequel to any of your team's previous 48 shorts AND include the required elements from that year.	25–27 Aug	
2018		Puddle	Slamming door	Shadow or silhouette	Main characters must be children (defined as "under 18") and/or animals.	11–13 May	
2019		Wind	Laughter	Double-take, overhead shot	Split-screen and break the 4th-wall.	14–16 Jun	
2020 (Note: New Zealand was mid-lockdown during shoot weekend.)		A Photograph	An Echo	An Arc Shot	N/A	17–19 Apr	
2021	Reluctant, unlikely, or anti-hero	Something Invisible	Heart-beat	Reaction Shot	Set in the dark.	5–7 Mar	
2021 (II) (Note: A second shoot weekend was held for centres in lockdown during the first weekend.)	Confidant	Package	Ticking	Reflection	Set in the dark.	12-14 Mar	
2022	A gate-keeper	A sign	A whisper	Worm's-eye view or Bird's-eye view	N/A	12–14 Aug	
2024	A traveller or neighbour	An exit	A warning	Match cut	N/A	17–19 May	
2025	Something precious	A miniature	An accident	Slow motion movement	N/A	15–17 Aug	

== Genres by year ==
Year	Staple Genres						Common Genres							Rarer Genres
Year	Action, Revenge	Crime, Heist	Horror, Splatter, Monster, Supernatural, Ghost, Zombie, Possession	Musical, Dance	Romance, Opposites attract, RomCom, & anti-	Sci-fi, Tech thriller, Time travel, Multi-verse Alien Robot/android	Buddy, Twin, Bro, Bechdel	Race against time	Fantasy, Adventure, Fairy-tale, Quest, Wish	Mystery, Puzzle	Mistaken identity, Secret identity	Real-time, One-shot	Super- hero	Rarer Genres
2006	✓	✓	✓	✓	✓	✓	✓		✓				✓	based on true story, coming of age, mokumentary, war, pretentious art film, puppet
2007		✓	✓	✓	✓				✓				✓	grindhouse, western, war, unnecessary sequel, coming of age, sex educational
2008	✓	✓	✓	✓	✓	✓	✓		✓	✓			✓	animal film, juvenile delinquent, drama, pretentious art film
2009	✓		✓	✓	✓							✓		parallel world, religious, nature runs amok, conspiracy, politically incorrect, educational film, shock ending
2010			✓	✓	✓	✓	✓							sports film, femme fatale film, bio pic, road movie, educational film
2011	✓	✓	✓	✓	✓				✓	✓			✓	one room, body switch, fad, road movie
2012	✓	✓	✓	✓	✓				✓			✓	✓	end of world, inspirational, found footage, erotic thriller, based on an urban legend
2013	✓	✓	✓	✓		✓✓		✓						non-dialogue, obsessive relationship, immobilized, converging story-line, reunion
2014	✓		✓	✓	✓	✓		✓	✓	✓	✓			against the odds, film within a film, shock ending
2015			✓	✓	✓	✓	✓			✓	✓			cat & mouse, last person on Earth, black comedy, other dimension, shock ending
2016		✓	✓		✓	✓	✓			✓	✓	✓		cat & mouse, comedy of errors, dystopian, lovers on the run, one location, punk, puppet
2017	✓	✓	✓✓	✓		✓✓	✓		✓					at night, bad seed, Christmas, survival, thriller, z-grade
2018		✓	✓✓✓	✓	✓✓	✓✓			✓					high school, fish-out-of-water, last day on Earth, spans more than 10 years
2019				✓	✓	✓✓	✓				✓	✓		coming-of-age, generation gap, gross-out/cringe, holiday, nature runs amok, wrong-place-wrong-time
2020			✓			✓			✓✓	✓				unwanted guest
2021		✓	✓✓	✓	✓	✓		✓	✓✓				✓	invitation, redemption
2021 (II) (Note: A second shoot weekend was held for centres in lockdown during the first weekend.)		✓✓	✓	✓		✓	✓	✓			✓	✓	✓	gross-out comedy
2022		✓	✓	✓		✓								anniversary, comedy of errors, impossible situation, swap movie, coming-of-age, pavalova western
2024		✓	✓✓✓	✓			✓		✓			✓		animal adventure, fish-out-of-water, lovers on the run
2025	✓		✓✓			✓	✓	✓	✓					holiday, found footage, road movie, cat & mouse, man vs nature

== Regional and national winners ==
After initially being held in Auckland in 2003 as part of the international 48 Hour Film Project, the independent 48Hours began in 2004 with teams in Auckland and Wellington. At its peak in 2011, it was represented in eight cities.

2003

- Auckland: Special Crime Unit - Lazy Racer Angela Adams (Note: The 2003 competition was part of the 48 Hour Film Project. "The Auckland 48 Hour Film Project". 48 Hour Film Project.)

2004

- Auckland: Jesse McLeod: The Journey - Classic
- Wellington: Heinous Crime - The Circus

2005

- Auckland: A Fairly Good Tale - Crash Zoom
- Wellington: Chip & Manny - Locked And Stapled
- Christchurch: Bruised Gold - Evil Genius Labs
- Dunedin: Mosgiel Tonight - Jo Seager Megadrive
- National Runner-Up: Bruised Gold - Evil Genius Labs (Christchurch)
- National Winner: A Fairly Good Tale - Crash Zoom (Auckland)

2006

- Auckland: Brown Peril - The Tim Porch Story - thedownlowconcept
- Wellington: The Baby Farmer - Clean Slate
- Christchurch: The Escort - FR7835
- Dunedin: Action At Both Ends - Daddy Cool
- Hamilton: Robin Slade - Time Tourist - Dance Donkee Dance
- National Runner-Up: Slade In Full - White Tiger (Wellington)
- National Winner: Brown Peril - The Tim Porch Story - thedownlowconcept (Auckland)

2007

- Auckland: Camp Fear - Mukpuddy Animation
- Wellington: Maori Detective and the Boogie Fever - Good Times
- Christchurch: Carboys and the Indian - The Outwits
- Dunedin: Bain: The Musical - Burt Hall Banana Republic
- Hamilton: The Playground - Taktix Films
- Gisborne: One Man's War - Cuzzie Films
- National Runner-Up: Carboys and the Indian - The Outwits (Christchurch)
- National Winner: Lease - Lense Flare (Auckland)

2008

- Auckland: The End - Fractured Radius
- Wellington: Darlene - Smashing Pants
- Christchurch: Agent Post - Spooce Media/The Real McCoy
- Dunedin: Two Bodies, One Night - The Dangly Gruffnuts
- Hamilton: Sum of the parts - Guerrilla Monkeys
- Gisborne: Le dernier jour de Tony - Kaiti Hill
- National Runner-Up: Beyond Belief - Lense Flare (Auckland)
- National Winner: F* Dance - Puppy Guts (Wellington)

2009

- Auckland: Nature's Baby - Sinistral
- Wellington: Otack Otack Otack Fall - Killah Walz/Orca
- Christchurch: New Fish - TBALC
- Dunedin: Charlotte - Line Men
- Hamilton: Hardwood Floors - Guerrilla Monkeys
- Gisborne: The Amazing World of Sticks - Kaiti Hill
- National Runner-Up: New Fish - TBALC (Christchurch)
- National Winner: Charlotte - Line Men (Dunedin)

2010

- Auckland: Only Son - thedownlowconcept
- Wellington: Balls & Chain - Dog Films
- Christchurch: Death in the West - Gorilla Team Gorilla
- Dunedin: The Stag Do - Mirage Videos
- Hamilton: Gone - Reel Good People
- Gisborne: A Toy Car named Sidney - 2 Many Darkies
- Taranaki: Hopping Away - Ivan Goff Fan Club
- National Third Place: The Pool - Winlove Adventure Brothers (Auckland)
- National Runner-Up: Confessions of a Fabricator - IdiotVision (Auckland)
- National Winner: Only Son - thedownlowconcept (Auckland)

2011

- Auckland: The Child Jumpers - Grand Cheval
- Wellington: Sketch - Couch Kumaras
- Christchurch: Naughty Man - SuspectTV
- Dunedin: Chatter - Rabies Babies
- Hamilton: Kingdom Of Shadow - Arthouse Massacre
- Gisborne: FAD Town - Cuzzie Films
- Taranaki: Well Strung - Rubber Soul Productions
- National Third Place: Meanie Pants - MukPuddy (Auckland)
- National Runner-Up: Copy That - Lense Flare (Auckland)
- National Winner: The Child Jumpers - Grand Cheval (Auckland)

2012

- Auckland: The Girl With The Clover Tattoo - Lense Flare
- Wellington: Brains? - Noise and Pictures
- Christchurch: An Inconvenient Hoof - Picton Pictures
- Dunedin: Do the Knight Thang - Flim Flom Films
- Hamilton: Dead Lucky - Tuff Collective
- National Third Place: Love in Decay - MukPuddy (Auckland)
- National Runner-Up: The Girl With The Clover Tattoo - Lense Flare (Auckland)
- National Winner: Brains? - Noise and Pictures (Wellington)

2013

- Auckland: Sleep Clinic - dr jeckyll
- Wellington: The Sleeping Plot - Traces of Nut
- Christchurch: Is Love Enough? - The Eh Team
- Dunedin: We Run The Night - SML Productions
- Hamilton: The Empath - Elysium Exit
- Gisborne: Bungy - Kaiti Hill
- Taranaki: Partners in Crime - Rubber Soul
- National Third Place: Autocraniotomous - NightOwls (Auckland)
- National Runner-Up: I Got Robots - Chess Club (Auckland)
- National Winner: The Sleeping Plot - Traces of Nut (Wellington)

2014

- Auckland: Dead End Job - Mukpuddy Animation
- Wellington: Rubble - Noise and Pictures
- Christchurch: The Ex - TBALC
- Dunedin: A Right Tool - Begged, Borrowed, Stolen
- Hamilton: Feed - Hoganstreetheroes
- Gisborne: Whai utu - Kratos
- Taranaki: Travel with Time Pieces - The Tanked Engines
- National Third Place: A Lesson on Probability - Mexico (Auckland)
- National Runner-Up: Rubble - Noise and Pictures (Wellington)
- National Winner: Pants On Fire - Lense Flare (Auckland)

2015

- Auckland: Bread Winner - Chess Club
- Wellington: Loyal - Couch Kumaras
- Christchurch: The Silent Man - TBALC
- Dunedin: 48 Days Later - Begged, Borrowed, Stolen
- Hamilton: The Specialist - CockUp Productions
- Gisborne: From - Kaiti Hill
- Taranaki: Beat Down - Camera Child
- National Third Place: Loyal - Couch Kumaras (Wellington)
- National Runner-Up: Tide - King Gains-Bury & Biches (Auckland)
- National Winner: Bread Winner - Chess Club (Auckland)

2016

- Auckland: Ghostfish: Catfished By A Ghost - Prime Rib
- Wellington: Love.exe - Bork!
- Christchurch: Down to the Wire - TBALC Alpha
- Dunedin: The Loom of Doctor Flowers - Super Furious Ninja Dragons
- Hamilton: Love is a Crime - DF-10
- Gisborne: Bromancing The Stone - Team Indeed
- Taranaki: A Bro's Life - Rubber Soul Productions
- National Third Place: Love.exe - Bork! (Wellington)
- National Runner-Up: Ghostfish: Catfished By A Ghost - Prime Rib (Auckland)
- National Winner: Time Travel Centre - Chillybox (Auckland)

2017

- Auckland: Under The Bridge - Cool Story Bro Film
- Wellington: Jack & Joni - Moffilaide
- Christchurch: Split Sibling Decision - Free Chicken
- Dunedin: The Beach - Dwarf Shortage
- Hamilton: Dude, That's Your Sister! - DF-10
- Bay of Plenty: Bonnie - The Mugshots
- Gisborne: KELVIN - Ma am
- Taranaki: Charlie Echo Alpha - Currie Street Creatives
- National Third Place: Feeding - Southern Belles (Auckland)
- National Runner-Up: A Friend For Life - Missing Pixels (Auckland)
- National Winner: Under The Bridge - Cool Story Bro Film (Auckland)

2018

- Auckland: La Coquille - Halcyon Entertainment
- Wellington: Master - Temple of Nut
- Christchurch: Utka - Poutine Wolf
- Dunedin: Lizard Does Earth - Watson and Cricket Productions
- Hamilton: Glow - Taktix Films
- Bay of Plenty: Manawa Bay - Tinker Tailor
- Gisborne: The Great Great Mistake - Kratos
- Taranaki: The Story of a Decade - Through the Lens Films
- National Third Place: Red Touch Yellow - PickleThugs (Auckland)
- National Runner-Up: Hero - Blood and Bone (Christchurch)
- National Winner: PepTok - Chillybox (Auckland)

2019

- Auckland: Like Nobody's Watching - Chillybox
- Wellington: Apollo 69 - Qualified Tim
- Christchurch: A Familiar Feeling - Snack to the Future
- Dunedin: Big Boys - Watson and Cricket Productions
- Hamilton: Daddio - Reneel Singh
- Bay of Plenty: Extra Time - Great Lakes Film Society
- Gisborne: The Noise Of Life - Kratos
- Taranaki: 40 Candles - Spacies Crew
- National Third Place: Toast - Missing Pixels (Auckland)
- National Runner-Up: Like Nobody's Watching - Chillybox (Auckland)
- National Winner: A Familiar Feeling - Snack to the Future (Christchurch)

2020

2020 did not have regional finals.

- National Third Place: Pupper Paleolithic - Too Much Spare Time
- National Runner-Up: The Visible Man - The Fubbs
- National Winner: For Generations - Squint Eastwood (Wellington)

2021

- Auckland: Unfinished Symphony - Awkward Animations
- Wellington: Good Girl - Traces of Nut
- Christchurch: The Dying Art of Cat Burglary - BAE24
- Dunedin: The Unseen - Jelly Mouth
- Hamilton: The Hitchhiker - Blink Blue Media
- Bay of Plenty: Impalpable - Temporary Estate
- Gisborne: A Job Worth Keeping - Kratos
- Taranaki: GOOD AS GOLD - Kinaki
- National Third Place: Āta - Mitchell's Here (Auckland)
- National Runner-Up: A Matter of Time - Apple Fork (Auckland)
- National Winner: Good Girl - Traces of Nut (Wellington)

2022

- Auckland: Love You Stranger - Missing Pixels
- Wellington: A Multitude Of Ways To Leave Your Lover - Child Support
- Christchurch: Going Solo - Rabid Auntie Jean
- Dunedin: Instant Cinematic Classic - Under-Funded Thunder Films
- Hamilton: Oh Crap - RS Productions
- Bay of Plenty: Sacrifarce - Great Lake Film Society
- Gisborne: 18 To Life - Kratos
- Taranaki: Daddy Daddy - Filmanui
- National Third Place: Love You Stranger - Missing Pixels (Auckland)
- National Runner-Up: A Multitude Of Ways To Leave Your Lover - Child Support (Wellington)
- National Winner: Big Questions - Mitchell's Here (Auckland)

2024

- Auckland: Thicker Than Water - Jovial Entertainment
- Wellington: Gutted - Couch Kumara
- Christchurch: Zero Mum Game - An Evening With
- Dunedin: The Fountain of Youth - Mayodaze
- Hamilton: Nuggets - Chicken
- Bay of Plenty: Loose End - Great Lake Film Society
- Gisborne: E.T.R - Hot Lunch
- Taranaki: Stella and Blarg at Large - Pastafarian Productions
- National Third Place: Loose End - Great Lake Film Society (Bay of Plenty)
- National Runner-Up: Sweets - Disqualified Tim (Wellington)
- National Winner: Nuggets - Chicken (Hamilton)
