= Sparkle Friends =

New Zealand television series

- Created by: Mukpuddy Animation
- Voices of: Charlie Panapa; Serena Cooper; Richard Mills; Tāmati Coffey; Jeremy Dillon; Jason Gunn
- Country of origin: New Zealand
- Original language: English

Production
- Running time: 2-3 minutes

Original release
- Network: TV2
- Release: 7 May 2006 – 25 July 2011

Sparkle Friends is a New Zealand animated series and segment produced by Mukpuddy Animation for New Zealand's long running children's show, What Now. The series stars the What Now presenters as children and a creature named Gun-gi, who vomits gunge, something that features heavily in What Now.

== Cast ==
- Serena Cooper as herself
- Richard Mills as himself
- Tāmati Coffey as himself
- Jeremy Dillon as Gun-gi and other miscellaneous characters
- Jason Gunn as Camilla and other miscellaneous characters
- Gem Knight as Princess Gem from Gungetonia
- Jarrod Wright as Roadblock
- Richard Simpson as Chafe Duffield
- Jocelyn Dell Christian as Pashmina, the Toothfairy, the Valley Girls, and Lush
- Ryan Cooper as various miscellaneous characters

== Episode list ==
=== Series 1 (2006) ===
Series 1 ran from 7 May to 2 July 2006.

No. overall	No. in season	Title	Original release date
1	1	"Got Gunge?"	7 May 2006
2	2	"Snap!"	14 May 2006
3	3	"In the Deep End"	21 May 2006
4	4	"Teething Trouble"	28 May 2006
5	5	"It's All Downhill"	4 June 2006
6	6	"High Score"	11 June 2006
7	7	"Sparkletron"	18 June 2006
8	8	"Survival of the Cutest"	25 June 2006
9	9	"The Sparkle Show"	25 June 2006
10	10	"What Becomes of the Broken Gungi?"	2 July 2006

=== Series 2 (2007) ===
Series 2 ran from 9 May to 9 July 2007.

No.	Title	Original release date
11	"Return of the Gun-gi."	9 May 2007
12	"Yabba Dabba Don't!"	2007
13	"Yo Ho Ho and a Bottle of Gunge"	2007
14	"Kentucky Fried Charlie"	2007
15	"Invasion of the Richie Snatchers"	2007
15	"Beauty and the Yeast"	2007
17	"Are We There Yeti?"	2007
18	"Rock'em Sock'em."	2007
19	"Insert Coin Here."	2007
20	"Send Out the Clowns"	2007

=== Series 3 (2008) ===
Series 3 ran from 15 July to 2 October 2008.

No.	Title	Original release date
21	"Son of a Gun-gi / Camilla at Large"	15 July 2008
22	"Almost Famous / Short Fuse"	2008
23	"Super Tu / Mo' Charlie Mo' Problems"	2008
24	"How Now Sea Cow / Summer Knights"	2008
25	"The Case of the Muddy Footprints / The Gungiest Place on Earth"	2008

=== Series 4 (2009-10) ===
Series 4 ran from 17 November 2009 to 15 March 2010.

No.	Title	Original release date
26	"Super Tu 2"	17 November 2009
27	"Roadblock (Special)"	2009
28	"Spooky Sunday / Rainbow Connection"	2009
29	"The Girl Next Door / My Tu Front Teeth"	2009
30	"Sprinkle Kids / Attack of the 50ft Toby"	2009

=== Series 5 (2010-11) ===
Series 5 ran from 8 November 2010 to 25 July 2011.

No.	Title	Original release date
31	"Sparkle Friends Next Level Part I"	8 November 2010
32	"Sparkle Friends Next Level Part II"	2010
33	"The Finale!"	2010
